= 2011–12 C.D. Guadalajara season =

Guadalajara
2011–12 season
- Chairman: Jorge Vergara
- Manager: José Luis Real (until Oct., 2011); Fernando Quirarte (Oct.–2011–Jan. 2012); Ignacio Ambríz (Jan. 2012–Apr. 2012); Alberto Coyote (interim) (Apr. 2012)
- Stadium: Estadio Omnilife
- Apertura 2011: 1st Final Phase Quarter-finals
- Clausura 2012: 15th
- Copa Libertadores: Group stage
- Top goalscorer: League: Apertura: Marco Fabián (8); Clausura: Héctor Reynoso (4); All: Marco Fabián (8)
| Home colours | Away colours |

The 2011–12 Guadalajara season was the 65th professional season of Mexico's top-flight football league. The season is split into two tournaments—the Torneo Apertura and the Torneo Clausura—each with identical formats and each contested by the same eighteen teams. Guadalajara began their season on July 23, 2011, against Atlante, winning 2–0. Guadalajara plays its home games on Saturdays at 7:00 pm local time.

== Torneo Apertura ==
=== Squad ===
Note: Flags indicate national team as defined under FIFA eligibility rules; some limited exceptions apply. Players may hold more than one non-FIFA nationality.

| No. | Pos. | Nation | Player |
|---|---|---|---|
| 1 | GK | MEX | Luis Ernesto Michel (vice-captain) |
| 2 | DF | MEX | Mario de Luna |
| 3 | DF | MEX | Arturo Ledesma |
| 4 | DF | MEX | Héctor Reynoso (captain) |
| 5 | DF | MEX | Patricio Araujo |
| 6 | DF | MEX | Omar Esparza |
| 8 | MF | MEX | Marco Fabián |
| 9 | FW | MEX | Omar Arellano |
| 10 | FW | MEX | Alberto Medina |
| 11 | MF | MEX | Julio Nava |
| 14 | MF | MEX | Jorge Enríquez |
| 15 | FW | MEX | Erick Torres |
| 16 | DF | MEX | Miguel Ángel Ponce |

| No. | Pos. | Nation | Player |
|---|---|---|---|
| 17 | FW | MEX | Jesús Sánchez |
| 18 | MF | MEX | Xavier Báez |
| 19 | DF | MEX | Jonny Magallón |
| 20 | MF | MEX | Édgar Mejía |
| 21 | FW | MEX | Antonio Salazar |
| 23 | GK | MEX | Víctor Hugo Hernández |
| 24 | MF | MEX | Jorge Mora |
| 25 | MF | MEX | Antonio Gallardo |
| 26 | DF | MEX | Kristian Álvarez |
| 34 | GK | MEX | Miguel Jiménez |
| 95 | MF | MEX | Giovani Casillas |
| 104 | FW | MEX | Carlos Fierro |

=== Regular season ===
Win Draw Loss

==== Apertura 2011 results ====
| July 23, 2011 Round 1 | Atlante | 0 – 2 | Guadalajara | Estadio Quintana Roo, Cancún |
| 17:00 | Ordaz (yellow card) 46'; Luna (yellow card) 61'; Cuevas (yellow card) 66'; Diego (yellow card) 86'; Amione (yellow card) 90+2' | Report | Ponce (yellow card) 33' de Luna (yellow card) 51'; Arellano 55'; Sánchez 90+4' | Referee: Erim Ramírez |

| July 31, 2011 Round 2 | Guadalajara | 2 – 1 | Chiapas | Estadio Omnilife, Zapopan |
| 17:00 | Báez (yellow card) 32'; Arellano 67'; Fabián 71', (yellow card) 72' | Report | Hernández (yellow card) 26'; J. Martínez 47'; Razo (yellow card) 83' | Referee: Jorge Antonio Pérez |

| September 2, 2011 Round 3 | Tijuana | 0 – 1 | Guadalajara | Estadio Caliente, Tijuana |
| 16:00 | Sand (yellow card) 36'; Almazán (yellow card) 47'; Molina (yellow card) 61' | Report | Reynoso 39'; Torres (yellow card) 62'; Medina (yellow card) 81' | Referee: Roberto García Orozco |

| August 6, 2011 Round 4 | Guadalajara | 0 – 0 | UNAM | Estadio Omnilife, Zapopan |
| 19:00 | Fabián (yellow card) 35'; Araujo (yellow card) 55'; Medina (yellow card) 88' | Report | Palacios (yellow card) 35' | Referee: Mauricio Morales |

| August 12, 2011 Round 5 | Morelia | 1 – 2 | Guadalajara | Estadio Morelos, Morelia |
| 20:10 | E. Pérez (yellow card) 43'; Manso 53', (yellow card) 84'; Aldrete (yellow card) 83' | Report | Esparza (yellow card) 28'; Corona 50' (o.g.); Magallón (red card) 56'; Araujo (red card) 70'; Reynoso (yellow card) 75'; Gallardo 79' de Luna (yellow card) 90+2' | Referee: Juan Genaro Medrano |

| August 20, 2011 Round 6 | Guadalajara | 2 – 1 | Monterrey | Estadio Omnilife, Zapopan |
| 19:00 | Fabián 28' (pen.), (yellow card) 39'; Ponce (yellow card) 43'; Medina 78' | Report | Perez (yellow card) 13'; Delgado 24'; Cardozo (yellow card) 29'; Mier (yellow card) 45'; Chávez (red card) 59' | Referee: Marco Antonio Rodríguez |

| August 27, 2011 Round 7 | San Luis | 2 – 0 | Guadalajara | Estadio Alfonso Lastras, San Luis Potosí |
| 20:45 | Chiapas (yellow card) 11'; Aguirre (yellow card) 32'; Arroyo 54'; Torres 85'; Velasco (yellow card) 87' | | Reynoso (yellow card) 41'; Araujo (yellow card) 72'; Torres (yellow card) 89' | Referee: Erim Ramírez |

| September 10, 2011 Round 8 | Santos Laguna | 1 – 1 | Guadalajara | Estadio Corona, Torreón |
| 19:00 | Peralta (yellow card) 17'; Figueroa 51'; Ludueña (yellow card) 57'; Rodríguez (yellow card) 80' | Report | Medina (yellow card) 21', (goal) 73'; Torres (yellow card) 84'; Michel (yellow card) 87' | Referee: Fabricio Morales |

| September 17, 2011 Round 9 | Guadalajara | 1 – 4 | Puebla | Estadio Jalisco, Guadalajara |
| 19:00 | Fabián 26' (pen.); Magallón (red card) 57'; Mejía (yellow card) 61'; Álvarez (yellow card) 67' (yellow-red card); Michel (yellow card) 84'; Reynoso (yellow card) 84' | Report | Pineda (yellow card) 22'; Polo (yellow card) 31'; Silva 44', 89'; Luis García 59' (pen.); Juárez (yellow card) 78'; Zamora 90+2' | Referee: Miguel Ángel Ortega |

| September 24, 2011 Round 10 | Cruz Azul | 1 – 1 | Guadalajara | Estadio Azul, Mexico City |
| 17:00 | Perea 62'; Ponce (yellow card) 62'; Torrado (yellow card) 75'; Pinto (yellow card) 90' | Report | Arellano 34'; Sánchez (yellow card) 43'; Ponce (yellow card) 49' (yellow-red card) 62' | Referee: Francisco Chacón |

| October 1, 2011 Round 11 | Guadalajara | 0 – 1 | Querétaro | Estadio Jalisco, Guadalajara |
| 19:00 | de Luna (yellow card) 79'; Fierro (yellow card) 90+1'; Nava (yellow card) 90+2' | Report | Ruiz 6'; Bueno (yellow card) 11'; Ocampo (yellow card) 24'; Cortés (yellow card) 27' | Referee: Mauricio Morales |

| October 8, 2011 Round 12 | Toluca | 0 – 0 | Guadalajara | Estadio Nemesio Díez, Toluca |
| 17:00 | Cruzalta (yellow card) 49'; Romagnoli (yellow card) 76'; Alonso (yellow card) 88' | Report | Fabián (yellow card) 50'; Medina (yellow card) 65'; Reynoso (yellow card) 90' | Referee: Jorge Antonio Pérez |

| October 15, 2011 Round 13 | Guadalajara | 5 – 2 | Estudiantes Tecos | Estadio Jalisco, Guadalajara |
| 19:00 | Torres 7', 56'; Fabián 32', 37', 55', (yellow card) 32'; Álvarez (yellow card) 62' (yellow-red card) 68'; Quirate (manager) (red card) 63'; Araujo (yellow card) 73'; Magallón (yellow card) 84' | Report | Colace (yellow card) 26'; Lillingston 53', (yellow card) 76'; Gómez 74' | Referee: Miguel Ángel Flores |

| October 23, 2011 Round 14 | América | 1 – 3 | Guadalajara | Estadio Azteca, Mexico City |
| 16:00 | Benítez 13'; Rosinei (red card) 59'; Molina (yellow card) 64'; Mosquera (yellow card) 86' | Report | Gallardo 5'; Fabian 18'; Torres 19' | Referee: Fernando Guerrero |

| October 26, 2011 Round 15 | Guadalajara | 1 – 0 | UANL | Estadio Jalisco, Guadalajara |
| 20:00 | Sánchez (yellow card) 34'; Gallardo (yellow card) 45'; Medina 51'; Reynoso (yellow card) 68' | Report | Juninho (yellow card) 20'; Lobos (yellow card) 24'; Viniegra (red card) 25'; Jiménez (yellow card) 28'; Dueñas (yellow card) 41' | Referee: José Alfredo Peñaloza |

| October 30, 2011 Round 16 | Atlas | 1 – 1 | Guadalajara | Estadio Jalisco, Guadalajara |
| 20:45 | Ramos (yellow card) 10' (yellow-red card) 39'; Arreola (yellow card) 44'; Bocanegra (yellow card) 68'; Ayala 78' | Report | Medina (yellow card) 36'; Fierro (yellow card) 53'; Torres 54' | Referee: Jorge Isaac Rojas |

| November 5, 2011 Round 17 | Guadalajara | 2 – 2 | Pachuca | Estadio Omnilife, Zapopan |
| 19:00 | Fabián 21'; Michel (red card) 50'; Torres 66' | Report | Muñoz Mustafa (red card) 52'; Brambila (yellow card) 70'; Esqueda 54' (pen.), 89', (yellow card) 90' | Referee: Ricardo Arellano |

=== Final phase ===
| November 19, 2011 Quarter-finals | Querétaro | 2 – 1 | Guadalajara | Estadio Corregidora, Querétaro |
| 17:00 | Bueno 9', 59'; Bautista (yellow card) 49'; Rico (yellow card) 58'; López (yellow card) 68' | Report | Sánchez (yellow card) 21'; Torres (yellow card) 56'; Enríquez 90+2' | Referee: Fernando Guerrero |

| November 26, 2011 Quarter-finals | Guadalajara | 0 – 0 | Querétaro | Estadio Omnilife, Zapopan |
| 19:00 | Reynoso (yellow card) 20'; Fabián (yellow card) 45' | Report | Ponce (yellow card) 1'; López (yellow card) 20'; Martínez (yellow card) 38'; Rico (yellow card) 52'; Sánchez (yellow card) 83' | Referee: Mauricio Morales |

Querétaro advanced 2–1 on aggregate

=== Goalscorers ===
| Position | Nation | Name | Goals scored |
|---|---|---|---|
| 1. | (Mexico) | Marco Fabián | 8 |
| 2. | (Mexico) | Erick Torres | 4 |
| 3. | (Mexico) | Omar Arellano | 3 |
| 3. | (Mexico) | Alberto Medina | 3 |
| 5. | (Mexico) | Jesús Sánchez | 2 |
| 5. | (Mexico) | Antonio Gallardo | 2 |
| 7. | (Mexico) | Héctor Reynoso | 1 |
| 7. | | Own Goals | 1 |
| TOTAL | | | 25 |

=== Results ===
==== Results summary ====
| Overall | | | | | | | | Home | | | | | | Away | | | | | |
| Pld | W | D | L | GF | GA | GD | Pts | W | D | L | GF | GA | GD | W | D | L | GF | GA | GD |
|---|---|---|---|---|---|---|---|---|---|---|---|---|---|---|---|---|---|---|---|
| 17 | 8 | 6 | 3 | 24 | 18 | +6 | 30 | 4 | 2 | 2 | 13 | 11 | +2 | 4 | 4 | 1 | 11 | 7 | +4 |

Last updated: 5 November 2011.
Source: Apertura 2010 results

==== Results by round ====
| Round | 1 | 2 | 3 | 4 | 5 | 6 | 7 | 8 | 9 | 10 | 11 | 12 | 13 | 14 | 15 | 16 | 17 |
|---|---|---|---|---|---|---|---|---|---|---|---|---|---|---|---|---|---|
| Ground | A | H | A | H | A | H | A | A | H | A | H | A | H | A | H | A | H |
| Result | W | W | W | D | W | W | L | D | L | D | L | D | W | W | W | D | D |
| Position | 3 | 3 | 4 | 3 | 2 | 1 | 3 | 1 | 3 | 3 | 5 | 7 | 3 | 1 | 1 | 1 | 1 |

Updated to match(es) played on 5 November 2011. Source: Apertura 2011 results and mediotiempo.com
A = Away; H = Home; W = Win; D = Draw; L = Loss

== Transfers ==
=== In ===
| # | Pos | Nat | Player | Age | From | Date | Notes |
|---|---|---|---|---|---|---|---|
| | DF | (Mexico) | Dionicio Escalante | 21 | Pachuca | December 8, 2011 | |

=== Out ===
| # | Pos | Nat | Player | Age | To | Date | Notes |
|---|---|---|---|---|---|---|---|
| 98 | MF | (Mexico) | José Tostado | 17 | Tigres UANL | September 22, 2011 | Sacked |
| 3 | DF | (Mexico) | Arturo Ledesma | 23 | Pachuca | December 8, 2011 | Loan |

== Torneo Clausura ==
=== Squad ===
Note: Flags indicate national team as defined under FIFA eligibility rules; some limited exceptions apply. Players may hold more than one non-FIFA nationality.

| No. | Pos. | Nation | Player |
|---|---|---|---|
| 1 | GK | MEX | Luis Ernesto Michel (vice-captain) |
| 2 | DF | MEX | Mario de Luna |
| 3 | MF | MEX | Dionicio Escalante |
| 4 | DF | MEX | Héctor Reynoso (captain) |
| 5 | DF | MEX | Patricio Araujo |
| 6 | DF | MEX | Omar Esparza |
| 7 | MF | MEX | Abraham Coronado |
| 8 | MF | MEX | Marco Fabián |
| 9 | FW | MEX | Omar Arellano |
| 10 | FW | MEX | Alberto Medina |
| 11 | MF | MEX | Julio Nava |
| 14 | MF | MEX | Jorge Enríquez |
| 15 | FW | MEX | Erick Torres |
| 16 | DF | MEX | Miguel Ángel Ponce |
| 17 | FW | MEX | Jesús Sánchez |

| No. | Pos. | Nation | Player |
|---|---|---|---|
| 18 | MF | MEX | Xavier Báez |
| 19 | DF | MEX | Jonny Magallón |
| 20 | MF | MEX | Édgar Mejía |
| 21 | FW | MEX | Antonio Salazar |
| 23 | GK | MEX | Víctor Hugo Hernández |
| 24 | MF | MEX | Jorge Mora |
| 25 | MF | MEX | Antonio Gallardo |
| 26 | DF | MEX | Kristian Álvarez |
| 31 | MF | MEX | Jorge Espericueta |
| 34 | GK | MEX | Miguel Jiménez |
| 42 | MF | MEX | José Verduzco |
| 45 | MF | MEX | Juan Pablo Orozco |
| 86 | DF | MEX | Luis Solorio |
| 95 | MF | MEX | Giovani Casillas |
| 104 | FW | MEX | Carlos Fierro |

=== Regular season ===
Win Draw Loss

==== Clausura 2012 results ====
| January 7, 2012 Round 1 | Guadalajara | 0 – 1 | Atlante | Estadio Omnilife, Zapopan |
| 19:00 | Araujo (red card) 90' | Report | Guagua (yellow card) 37'; Arroyo 44'; Vera (yellow card) 54'; Guerrero (yellow card) 71'; Fonseca (yellow card) 90+2' | Referee: Ricardo Arellano |

| January 14, 2012 Round 2 | Chiapas | 3 – 1 | Guadalajara | Estadio Victor Manuel Reyna, Tuxtla Gutiérrez |
| 17:00 | Esqueda (yellow card) 13'; Zamorano (yellow card) 18'; Corona 25'; Flores (yellow card) 52'; Fuentes (yellow card) 57'; M. Martínez (yellow card) 62' (yellow-red card) 79'; Rodríguez 63'; J. Martínez 72', (yellow card) 90+3'; E. Hernández (yellow card) 90+4' | Report | Báez (yellow card) 32'; Reynoso 53', (red card) 88'; Fabián (yellow card) 62'; Sánchez (yellow card) 68'; Enríquez (yellow card) 74' (red card) 83' | Referee: Miguel Ángel Flores |

| January 21, 2012 Round 3 | Guadalajara | 0 – 2 | Tijuana | Estadio Omnilife, Zapopan |
| 19:00 | Báez (yellow card) 5'; Álvarez (yellow card) 17'; Torres (yellow card) 90' | Report | Gandolfi (yellow card) 40'; Sand 16', 85'; Arce (yellow card) 63'; Santago (yellow card) 90' | Referee: Miguel Ángel Ayala |

| January 29, 2012 Round 4 | UNAM | 0 – 0 | Guadalajara | Estadio Olímpico Universitario, Mexico City |
| 12:00 | Palacios (yellow card) 85' | Report | Torres (yellow card) 26'; Nava (yellow card) 53' | Referee: Antony Zanjuampa |

| February 4, 2012 Round 5 | Guadalajara | 1 – 2 | Morelia | Estadio Omnilife, Zapopan |
| 19:00 | Arellano 39'; Araujo (yellow card) 61'; Magallón (yellow card) 85' | Report | Pérez (yellow card) 19'; Rojas (yellow card) 65'; Sabah 57', 83', (yellow card) 85' | Referee: José Alfredo Peñaloza |

| February 11, 2012 Round 6 | Monterrey | 2 – 0 | Guadalajara | Estadio Tecnológico, Monterrey |
| 17:00 | de Nigris 70'; Reyna 77'; Zavala (yellow card) 90' | Report | Medina (yellow card) 17' | Referee: Mauricio Morales |

| February 18, 2012 Round 7 | Guadalajara | 0 – 0 | San Luis | Estadio Omnilife, Zapopan |
| 19:00 | | Report | Arredondo (yellow card) 19'; Pérez (yellow card) 63' | Referee: Erim Ramírez |

| February 26, 2012 Round 8 | Guadalajara | 2 – 1 | Santos Laguna | Estadio Omnilife, Zapopan |
| 16:00 | Fabián (yellow card) 34', (goal) 37'; Reynoso (yellow card) 36'; Araujo (yellow card) 48'; Torres 57', (yellow card) 68' | Report | Baloy (yellow card) 45+'; Galindo (yellow card) 46'; Salinas (yellow card) 69'; Gómez 77' | Referee: Marco Antonio Rodríguez |

| March 4, 2012 Round 9 | Puebla | 1 – 2 | Guadalajara | Estadio Cuauhtémoc, Puebla |
| 16:00 | Juárez (yellow card) 22' (yellow-red card) 54'; Luis García 45'; Zamora (yellow card) 67'; Lacerda (yellow card) 70'; Álvarez (yellow card) 90'; Pozos (yellow card) 90+3' | Report | Magallón (yellow card) 34'; Reynoso 51' (pen.); Enriquez 60'; Torres (yellow card) 90'; Fabián (yellow card) 90+1' | Referee: Roberto García Orozco |

| March 10, 2012 Round 10 | Guadalajara | 2 – 1 | Cruz Azul | Estadio Omnilife, Zapopan |
| 19:00 | Sánchez (yellow card) 20'; Reynoso (yellow card) 21', (goal) 90+5' (pen.); Torres 88'; Michel (yellow card) 90+4' | Report | Castro (yellow card) 20'; Villa 22'; Giménez (yellow card) 36'; Corona (yellow card) 87'; Araujo (red card) 90' | Referee: Jorge Antonio Pérez |

| March 17, 2012 Round 11 | Querétaro | 0 – 0 | Guadalajara | Estadio Corregidora, Querétaro |
| 17:00 | Mondragón (yellow card) 23'; Pérez (yellow card) 26'; Romo (yellow card) 26'; Alemanno (yellow card) 33'; Garcia Arias (yellow card) 83' | Report | Magallón (yellow card) 19'; Araujo (yellow card) 30'; Álvarez (yellow card) 35'; Fierro (yellow card) 75'; Mejia (yellow card) 90+2' | Referee: Fabricio Morales |

| March 24, 2012 Round 12 | Guadalajara | 2 – 0 | Toluca | Estadio Omnilife, Zapopan |
| 19:00 | Arellano 24'; Álvarez (yellow card) 38'; Araujo (yellow card) 56'; Reynoso 62' (pen.); Fierro (yellow card) 88' | Report | Talavera (yellow card) 61'; Torres (yellow card) 65'; Dueñas (red card) 88' | Referee: Mauricio Morales |

| April 1, 2012 Round 13 | Estudiantes Tecos | 1 – 0 | Guadalajara | Estadio Tres de Marzo, Zapopan |
| 18:00 | Colace (yellow card) 19'; Pérez (yellow card) 21'; Sambueza (yellow card) 45+'; Mejía 85' (o.g) | Report | Casillas (yellow card) 35' | Referee: Jorge Isaac Rojas |

| April 8, 2012 Round 14 | Guadalajara | 0 – 1 | América | Estadio Omnilife, Zapopan |
| 18:00 | Fabián (yellow card) 23'; Álvarez (yellow card) 36'; Araujo (yellow card) 45+'; Báez (yellow card) 49'; Reynoso (red card) 90+2' | Report | Pimentel (yellow card) 10'; Cárdenas (yellow card) 48'; Aguilar 85' | Referee: Marco Antonio Rodríguez |

| April 14, 2012 Round 15 | UANL | 2 – 1 | Guadalajara | Estadio Universitario, San Nicolás |
| 19:00 | Jiménez (yellow card) 23'; Ayala (yellow card) 27'; Lobos (yellow card) 54'; Salcido 72'; Álvarez (yellow card) 79'; Juninho 90+2' | Report | Arellano 21'; Torres (yellow card) 33' (yellow-red card) 38'; Fabián (yellow card) 38' (yellow-red card) 73'; Sánchez (red card) 90+2' | Referee: José Alfredo Peñaloza |

| April 21, 2012 Round 16 | Guadalajara | 0 – 1 | Atlas | Estadio Omnilife, Zapopan |
| 19:00 | Álvarez (yellow card) 17' (yellow-red card) 90' de Luna (yellow card) 48'; Arrellano (yellow card) 61' | Report | Ayala (yellow card) 17' (red card) 90+3'; Santos (yellow card) 39', (goal) 48'; Barraza (yellow card) 51'; Cufré (yellow card) 63'; Paganoni (yellow card) 65' | Referee: Mauricio Morales |

| April 28, 2012 Round 17 | Pachuca | 3 – 1 | Guadalajara | Estadio Hidalgo, Pachuca |
| 19:00 | Ayoví 4'; Muñoz Mustafá (yellow card) 28'; Castillo 40'; Arreola (yellow card) 52'; Brambila (yellow card) 53'; López 76' (pen.) | Report | Araujo (yellow card) 2'; Salazar 34'; Michel (yellow card) 41'; Reynoso (yellow card) 45' de Luna (yellow card) 75' | Referee: Antony Zanjuampa |

Guadalajara did not qualify to the Final Phase

=== Goalscorers ===
| Position | Nation | Name | Goals scored |
|---|---|---|---|
| 1. | (Mexico) | Héctor Reynoso | 4 |
| 2. | (Mexico) | Omar Arellano | 2 |
| 3. | (Mexico) | Erick Torres | 2 |
| 4. | (Mexico) | Jorge Enríquez | 1 |
| 4. | (Mexico) | Marco Fabián | 1 |
| 4. | (Mexico) | Antonio Salazar | 1 |
| TOTAL | | | 12 |

=== Results ===
==== Results summary ====
| Overall | | | | | | | | Home | | | | | | Away | | | | | |
| Pld | W | D | L | GF | GA | GD | Pts | W | D | L | GF | GA | GD | W | D | L | GF | GA | GD |
|---|---|---|---|---|---|---|---|---|---|---|---|---|---|---|---|---|---|---|---|
| 17 | 4 | 3 | 10 | 12 | 20 | −8 | 15 | 3 | 1 | 5 | 7 | 8 | −1 | 1 | 2 | 5 | 5 | 12 | −7 |

Last updated: 28 April 2012.
Source: Clausura 2012 results

==== Results by round ====
| Round | 1 | 2 | 3 | 4 | 5 | 6 | 7 | 8 | 9 | 10 | 11 | 12 | 13 | 14 | 15 | 16 | 17 |
|---|---|---|---|---|---|---|---|---|---|---|---|---|---|---|---|---|---|
| Ground | H | A | H | A | H | A | H | H | A | H | A | H | A | H | A | H | A |
| Result | L | L | L | D | L | L | D | W | W | W | D | W | L | L | L | L | W |
| Position | 15 | 16 | 18 | 18 | 18 | 18 | 18 | 17 | 15 | 12 | 12 | 11 | 11 | 12 | 14 | 15 | 15 |

Updated to match(es) played on 29 April 2012. Source: Clausura 2012 results and mediotiempo.com
A = Away; H = Home; W = Win; D = Draw; L = Loss

== Copa Libertadores ==
=== Group 7 ===
| Team | Pld | W | D | L | GF | GA | GD | Pts |
|---|---|---|---|---|---|---|---|---|
| (Argentina) Vélez Sársfield | 4 | 3 | 0 | 1 | 7 | 3 | +4 | 9 |
| (Uruguay) Defensor Sporting | 4 | 2 | 0 | 2 | 3 | 4 | −1 | 6 |
| (Ecuador) Deportivo Quito | 4 | 1 | 1 | 2 | 4 | 4 | 0 | 4 |
| (Mexico) Guadalajara | 4 | 1 | 1 | 2 | 2 | 5 | −3 | 4 |

| February 7, 2012 Round 1 | Guadalajara (Mexico) | 1 – 1 | (Ecuador) Deportivo Quito | Estadio Omnilife, Zapopan |
| 20:15 UTC−06:00 | Arellano 90+2' | Report | Alustiza 7' | Referee: Juan Soto (Venezuela) |

| February 22, 2012 Round 2 | Vélez Sársfield (Argentina) | 3 – 0 | (Mexico) Guadalajara | José Amalfitani Stadium, Buenos Aires |
| 22:00 UTC−03:00 | Cerro (yellow card) 31'; Ortiz (yellow card) 63'; Obolo 67'; Insua 81'; Insua 82' | Report | Baez (yellow card) 43'; Fabian (yellow card) 63'; Araujo (yellow card) 74' | Referee: Leandro Vuaden (Brazil) |

| March 13, 2012 Round 3 | Guadalajara (Mexico) | 1 – 0 | (Uruguay) Defensor Sporting | Estadio Omnilife, Zapopan |
| 21:15 UTC−06:00 | Fierro 10' | Report | | Referee: Marlon Escalante (Venezuela) |

| March 28, 2012 Round 4 | Defensor Sporting (Uruguay) | 1 – 0 | (Mexico) Guadalajara | Estadio Luis Franzini, Montevideo |
| 19:45 UTC−03:00 | Olivera 70' | Report | | Referee: Enrique Cáceres (Paraguay) |

| April 11, 2012 Round 5 | Guadalajara (Mexico) | v | (Argentina) Vélez Sársfield | Estadio Omnilife, Zapopan |
| 17:45 UTC−05:00 | | Report |

| April 17, 2012 Round 6 | Deportivo Quito (Ecuador) | v | (Mexico) Guadalajara | Estadio Olímpico Atahualpa, Quito |
| 18:15 UTC−05:00 | | Report |

=== Goalscorers ===
| Position | Nation | Name | Goals scored |
|---|---|---|---|
| 1. | (Mexico) | Omar Arellano | 1 |
| 1. | (Mexico) | Carlos Fierro | 1 |
| TOTAL | | | 2 |
