= 2012–13 C.D. Guadalajara season =

Guadalajara
2012–13 season
- Chairman: Dennis te Kloese
- Manager: John van 't Schip (until January 3, 2013); Benjamin Galindo (from January 3, 2013)
- Stadium: Estadio Omnilife
- Apertura 2012: 8th Final phase quarter-finals
- Clausura 2013: 17th
- Champions League: Group stage
- Top goalscorer: League: Apertura: Rafael Márquez Lugo (8); Clausura: Rafael Márquez Lugo (7); All: Rafael Márquez Lugo (15)
- Highest home attendance: Apertura: 37,436 vs Tijuana (November 11, 2012); Clausura: 41,523 vs América (March 31, 2013)
- Lowest home attendance: Apertura: 15,528 vs UANL (October 2, 2012); Clausurs: 18,920 vs Querétaro (April 28, 2013)
Home colours	Away colours

The 2012–13 Guadalajara season was the 66th professional season of Mexico's top-flight football league. The season is split into two tournaments—the Torneo Apertura and the Torneo Clausura—each with identical formats and each contested by the same eighteen teams. Guadalajara began their season on July 22, 2012 against Toluca. Guadalajara played their homes games on Sundays at 5:00pm local time. Guadalajara reached the final phase in the Apertura tournament but were eliminated by Toluca in the quarter-finals, Guadalajara did not reach the final phase in the Clausura tournament.

== Torneo Apertura ==
=== Squad ===
Note: Flags indicate national team as defined under FIFA eligibility rules; some limited exceptions apply. Players may hold more than one non-FIFA nationality.

No.	Pos.	Nation	Player
1	GK	MEX	Luis Ernesto Michel (vice-captain)
2	DF	MEX	Mario de Luna
3	DF	MEX	Kristian Álvarez
4	DF	MEX	Héctor Reynoso (captain)
5	MF	MEX	Patricio Araujo
6	DF	MEX	Omar Esparza
7	FW	MEX	Rafael Márquez Lugo
8	MF	MEX	Luis Ernesto Pérez
9	FW	MEX	Omar Arellano
10	MF	MEX	Marco Fabián
11	MF	MEX	Julio Nava
13	MF	MEX	Abraham Coronado
14	MF	MEX	Jorge Enríquez
15	FW	MEX	Jesús Padilla

No.	Pos.	Nation	Player
16	DF	MEX	Miguel Ángel Ponce
17	FW	MEX	Jesús Sánchez
18	MF	MEX	Xavier Báez
19	FW	MEX	Érick Torres
20	FW	MEX	Giovani Casillas
21	FW	MEX	Carlos Fierro
23	FW	MEX	Michel Vázquez
24	DF	MEX	Juan Ocampo
25	MF	MEX	Antonio Gallardo
26	GK	MEX	José Antonio Rodríguez
27	DF	MEX	Christian Pérez
28	MF	MEX	Giovanni Hernández
29	MF	MEX	Frank Vargas
30	GK	MEX	Liborio Sánchez

=== Regular season ===
Win Draw Loss

==== Apertura 2012 results ====
July 22, 2012 Round 1	Toluca	2–1	Guadalajara	Toluca, Estado de Mexico
12:00	Esquivel 3'; Cacho 32'; Wilson Mathías (yellow card) 57'	Report	Márquez 67'; Araujo (yellow card) 79'	Stadium: Estadio Nemesio Díez; Referee: Francisco Chacón

July 29, 2012 Round 2	Guadalajara	0–1	Santos Laguna	Zapopan, Jalisco
17:00	de Luna (yellow card) 42'	Report	Gómez (yellow card) 45+'; Mares (yellow card) 64'; Crosas (yellow card) 81'; Sánchez (yellow card) 87'; Quintero 89'	Stadium: Estadio Omnilife; Referee: Marco Antonio Rodríguez

August 4, 2012 Round 3	Cruz Azul	0–0	Guadalajara	Mexico City
17:00	Pavone (yellow card) 45+'	Report	Esparza (yellow card) 60'	Stadium: Estadio Azul; Attendance: 30,018; Referee: Fernando Guerrero

August 12, 2012 Round 4	Guadalajara	1–1	Morelia	Zapopan, Jalisco
18:00	Sánchez (yellow card) 45'; Márquez (red card) 70'; Báez 81'	Report	Romero 34'; Huiqui (yellow card) 38'; Romano (red card) 40' (manager)	Stadium: Estadio Omnilife; Referee: José Alfredo Peñaloza

August 18, 2012 Round 5	San Luis	0–1	Guadalajara	San Luis Potosí, San Luis Potosí
21:00	Fernández (yellow card) 16'; Orozco (yellow card) 33'; Velasco (yellow card) 68'; Mendoza (yellow card) 68'; Correa (yellow card) 84'	Report	Arellano (yellow card) 47'; Ponce (yellow card) 83'; Fierro 82'	Stadium: Estadio Alfonso Lastras; Attendance: 13,071; Referee: Jorge Antonio Pérez

August 26, 2012 Round 6	Guadalajara	1–2	Monterrey	Zapopan, Jalisco
17:00	Márquez 16'; Fabián (yellow card) 38'	Report	Suazo 56', 61'	Stadium: Estadio Omnilife; Attendance: 27,467; Referee: Ricardo Arellano

September 2, 2012 Round 7	Guadalajara	1–1	Puebla	Zapopan, Jalisco
17:00	Reynoso (yellow card) 29'; Morales 81'; Araujo (yellow card) 90+2'	Report	Gastélum (yellow card) 1'; Chávez 31'	Stadium: Estadio Omnilife; Referee: Fabricio Morales

September 14, 2012 Round 8	León	1–2	Guadalajara	León, Guanajuato
21:30	Montes (yellow card) 10'; Vázquez 75' (pen.), (yellow card) 90+1'; Magallón (red card) 79'; Peña (yellow card) 85'	Report	Sánchez (yellow card) 8'; Báez (red card) 32'; Araujo (yellow card) 52'; Enriquez 82'; Esparza (yellow card) 65'; Álvarez (yellow card) 73'; Márquez 90+2'	Stadium: Estadio León; Attendance: 25,595; Referee: Roberto García Orozco

September 23, 2012 Round 9	Guadalajara	0–0	UNAM	Zapopan, Jalisco
17:00	Reynoso (yellow card) 54'; Araujo (yellow card) 70'	Report		Stadium: Estadio Omnilife; Attendance: 33,188; Referee: Mauricio Morales

September 29, 2012 Round 10	Pachuca	1–0	Guadalajara	Pachuca, Hidalgo
19:00	Cejas (yellow card) 43', (goal) 60' (pen.); Medina (yellow card) 55'; Rojas (yellow card) 65'; Vidrio (yellow card) 74' da Silva (yellow card) 79'	Report	Perales (yellow card) 42'	Stadium: Estadio Hidalgo; Attendance: 27,489; Referee: Jorge Isaac Rojas

October 2, 2012 Round 11	Guadalajara	2–1	UANL	Zapopan, Jalisco
19:00	Márquez 22'; Morales 62'	Report	Pulido 78'	Stadium: Estadio Omnilife; Attendance: 15,528; Referee: Marco Antonio Rodríguez

October 6, 2012 Round 12	América	1–3	Guadalajara	Mexico City
17:00	Medina 40'; Aldrete (yellow card) 70'	Report	Fabián 35', (yellow card) 37'; Márquez 59', 67'	Stadium: Estadio Azteca; Attendance: 73,870; Referee: Jorge Antonio Pérez

October 14, 2012 Round 13	Guadalajara	1–1	Chiapas	Zapopan, Jalisco
17:00	Araujo (yellow card) 20'; Reynoso (yellow card) 24' (yellow-red card) 87'; Fabián (yellow card) 24'; Gallardo 41'	Report	Jiménez (yellow card) 45+1'; Rey (yellow card) 55', (goal) 66'; Corral (yellow card) 68'; Rodríguez (yellow card) 84'	Stadium: Estadio Omnilife; Attendance: 19,455; Referee: Miguel Ángel Flores

October 21, 2012 Round 14	Atlante	3–1	Guadalajara	Cancún, Quintana Roo
18:00	Maidana 3', (yellow card) 4' (yellow-red card) 48'; Guagua (yellow card) 22'; Paredes 24', 44', (yellow card) 78'; Muñoz (yellow card) 81'; O. Martínez (yellow card) 88'; Vera (yellow card) 90'	Report	Álvarez (yellow card) 78'; Fabián 89' (pen.)	Stadium: Estadio Andrés Quintana Roo; Attendance: 12,146; Referee: Ricardo Arellano

October 28, 2012 Round 15	Guadalajara	2–0	Atlas	Zapopan, Jalisco
17:00	Márquez 11'; Fabián 40'; Arrellano (yellow card) 71'; Ponce (yellow card) 87'	Report	Rodríguez (yellow card) 48' (yellow-red card) 72'; Robles (yellow card) 50'; Mancilla (yellow card) 78'; Erpen (yellow card) 81'	Stadium: Estadio Omnilife; Attendance: 33,820; Referee: Óscar Macias

November 3, 2012 Round 16	Querétaro	0–1	Guadalajara	Querétaro, Querétaro
17:00	Escalante (yellow card) 24'; Oviedo (yellow card) 75'; Rippa (yellow card) 90+2'; Jiménez (yellow card) 90+4'	Report	Fabián 83'	Stadium: Estadio Corregidora; Attendance: 21,600+ Referee: Roberto García Orozco

November 11, 2012 Round 17	Guadalajara	0–2	Tijuana	Zapopan, Jalisco
17:00	Fabián (yellow card) 61'	Report	Moreno 1'; Riascos 3'; Gandolfi (yellow card) 45+3'; Pellerano (yellow card) 62'; Aguilar (yellow card) 63'	Stadium: Estadio Omnilife; Attendance: 37,436; Referee: Francisco Chacón

==== Final phase ====
November 15, 2012 Quarter-finals	Guadalajara	1–2	Toluca	Zapopan, Jalisco
21:00	Márquez 74' (pen.); Arellano (yellow card) 90+1'; Morales (yellow card) 90+2'	Report	Ríos 24'; Sinha 29'; Tejada (yellow card) 63'; Novatetti (yellow card) 68'; Talavera (yellow card) 73'; Rodríguez (yellow card) 81'; Benítez (yellow card) 90+2'	Stadium: Estadio Omnilife; Attendance: 23,189; Referee: Fernando Guerrero

November 18, 2012 Quarter-finals	Toluca	3–1	Guadalajara	Toluca, Estado de México
12:00	Cabrera (yellow card) 30'; Sinha (yellow card) 39'; Wilson Mathías 56'; Lucas Silva 58'; Cacho 71'	Report	Araujo (yellow card) 65'; Morales (yellow card) 67'; Torres 81'	Stadium: Estadio Nemesio Díez; Attendance: 19,575; Referee: Fabricio Morales

Toluca advanced 5–2 on aggregate

=== Goalscorers ===
==== Regular season ====
Position	Nation	Name	Goals scored
1.	(Mexico)	Rafael Márquez Lugo	7
2.	(Mexico)	Marco Fabián	3
3.	(Mexico)	Luis Ángel Morales	2
4.	(Mexico)	Xavier Báez	1
4.	(Mexico)	Jorge Enríquez	1
4.	(Mexico)	Carlos Fierro	1
4.	(Mexico)	Antonio Gallardo	1
TOTAL			17

==== Final phase ====
Position	Nation	Name	Goals scored
1.	(Mexico)	Rafael Márquez Lugo	1
1.	(Mexico)	Erick Torres	1
TOTAL			2

=== Results ===
==== Results summary ====
Overall								Home						Away					
Pld	W	D	L	GF	GA	GD	Pts	W	D	L	GF	GA	GD	W	D	L	GF	GA	GD
17	6	5	6	17	17	0	23	1	4	3	6	9	−3	5	1	3	11	8	+3

Last updated: 11 November 2012.
Source: Apertura 2012 results

==== Results by round ====
Round	1	2	3	4	5	6	7	8	9	10	11	12	13	14	15	16	17
Ground	A	H	A	H	A	H	H	A	H	A	H	A	H	A	A	A	H
Result	L	L	D	D	W	L	D	W	D	L	W	W	D	L	W	W	L
Position	15	15	15	15	13	14	14	14	13	15	11	10	8	12	8	7	8

Updated to match(es) played on 11 November 2012. Source: Apertura 2012 results and mediotiempo.com
A = Away; H = Home; W = Win; D = Draw; L = Loss

== Torneo Clausura ==
=== Squad ===
Note: Flags indicate national team as defined under FIFA eligibility rules; some limited exceptions apply. Players may hold more than one non-FIFA nationality.

No.	Pos.	Nation	Player
1	GK	MEX	Luis Michel (vice-captain)
3	DF	MEX	Kristian Álvarez
4	DF	MEX	Héctor Reynoso (captain)
5	MF	MEX	Patricio Araujo
6	DF	MEX	Adrián Cortés
7	FW	MEX	Rafael Márquez Lugo
9	FW	MEX	Miguel Sabah
10	MF	MEX	Marco Fabián
13	DF	MEX	Abraham Coronado
14	MF	MEX	Jorge Enríquez
16	DF	MEX	Miguel Ángel Ponce
17	MF	MEX	Jesús Sánchez
19	FW	MEX	Érick Torres
21	FW	MEX	Carlos Fierro

No.	Pos.	Nation	Player
23	MF	MEX	Luis Ernesto Pérez
24	DF	MEX	Sergio Pérez
28	MF	MEX	Giovanni Hernández
36	DF	MEX	Carlos Villanueva
13	FW	MEX	Roberto Marcos Zetter
132	GK	MEX	Diego Ávila
143	DF	MEX	Víctor Perales
144	DF	MEX	Juan Basulto
145	MF	MEX	Michael Pérez
151	GK	MEX	Miguel Jiménez
155	DF	MEX	Hedgardo Marín
156	MF	MEX	Irving Ávalos
160	FW	MEX	Juan Carlos Martínez
163	MF	MEX	Luis Morales

=== Regular season ===
Win Draw Loss

==== Clausura 2013 results ====
January 6, 2013 Round 1	Guadalajara	1–1	Toluca	Zapopan, Jalisco
17:00	Sánchez (yellow card) 10'; Fabián (yellow card) 83'; Sabah 85', (red card) 89'	Report	Lucas Silva 83'; Báez (yellow card) 80'; Dueñas (yellow card) 86'	Stadium: Estadio Omnilife; Attendance: 28,545; Referee: Fabricio Morales

January 11, 2013 Round 2	Santos Laguna	2–0	Guadalajara	Torreón, Coahuila
21:30	Peralta (yellow card) 33', (goal) 35', 73'; Crosas (yellow card) 44'; Mares (yellow card) 46'; Estrada (yellow card) 55'	Report	Fabián (yellow card) 45+1'; Ponce (yellow card) 74'; Pérez (yellow card) 90+1'	Stadium: Estadio Corona; Attendance: 30,000; Referee: Roberto García Orozco

January 20, 2013 Round 3	Guadalajara	1–1	Cruz Azul	Zapopan, Jalisco
17:00	Márquez 39'	Report	Orozco 30'; Torrado (yellow card) 58'; Bertolo (yellow card) 60' (yellow-red card) 83'; Flores (yellow card) 72' (yellow-red card) 81'; Perea (yellow card) 86'	Stadium: Estadio Omnilife; Attendance: 36,754; Referee: Francisco Chacón

January 25, 2013 Round 4	Morelia	1–1	Guadalajara	Morelia, Michoacán
19:30	Álvarez (yellow card) 9'; Rojas (yellow card) 25', (goal) 89'	Report	Sabah (yellow card) 9'; Márquez 52', (yellow card) 87'; Álvarez (red card) 56'; Fabián (yellow card) 57'; Morales (yellow card) 82'	Stadium: Estadio Morelos; Attendance: 26,408; Referee: Paul Delgadillo

February 3, 2013 Round 5	Guadalajara	1–1	San Luis	Zapopan, Jalisco
12:00	Fabián 23'; Araujo (yellow card) 68'; Reynoso (yellow card) 73'	Report	Muñoz (yellow card) 34'; Matos 54'; Esparza (yellow card) 66'; Mendoza (yellow card) 90'	Stadium: Estadio Omnilife; Attendance: 24,003; Referee: César Arturo Ramos

February 9, 2013 Round 6	Monterrey	0–1	Guadalajara	Monterrey, Nuevo León
19:00	Ayoví (yellow card) 17'; Zavala (yellow card) 40'; Delgado (yellow card) 84'	Report	Márquez 67', (yellow card) 84'; Enríquez (yellow card) 87'	Stadium: Estadio Tecnológico; Attendance: 33,377; Referee: José Alfredo Peñaloza

February 17, 2013 Round 7	Puebla	1–1	Guadalajara	Puebla, Puebla
16:00	Borja 52'	Report	Fabián 54'; Ponce (yellow card) 87'	Stadium: Estadio Cuauhtémoc; Referee: Ricardo Arellano

February 24, 2013 Round 8	Guadalajara	2–1	León	Zapopan, Jalisco
17:00	Fabián 11', 79', (yellow card) 27'; Peráles (yellow card) 55'; Sánchez (yellow card) 87'; López (yellow card) 90'	Report	Britos (yellow card) 3', (goal) 61'; Hernández (yellow card) 62'; Vázquez (yellow card) 75'; Montes (yellow card) 80'; Burbano (yellow card) 85'; González (yellow card) 90+2'; Peña (yellow card) 90+5'	Stadium: Estadio Omnilife; Attendance: 38,706; Referee: Erim Ramírez

March 3, 2013 Round 9	UNAM	1–1	Guadalajara	Coyoacán, Mexico City
12:00	Bravo 26'	Report	Sabah 40', (yellow card) 49'; Sánchez (yellow card) 49'	Stadium: Estadio Olímpico Universitario; Attendance: 40,651; Referee: Roberto García Orozco

March 10, 2013 Round 10	Guadalajara	1–0	Pachuca	Zapopan, Jalisco
17:00	Márquez 19'; Cortés (yellow card) 42'	Report	Arreola (yellow card) 15'	Stadium: Estadio Omnilife; Attendance: 23,729; Referee: Miguel Ángel Chacón

March 16, 2013 Round 11	UANL	1–1	Guadalajara	San Nicolás de los Garza, Nuevo León
19:00	Álvarez 48'; Lobos (yellow card) 71'; Torres Nilo (yellow card) 76'; Luis García (yellow card) 77'	Report	S. Pérez (yellow card) 7'; Sabah 34', (yellow card) 90+1'; Araujo (yellow card) 62' (yellow-red card) 79'	Stadium: Estadio Universitario; Attendance: 39,350; Referee: Jorge Antonio Pérez

March 31, 2012 Round 12	Guadalajara	0–2	América	Zapopan, Jalisco
20:00	S. Pérez (yellow card) 2' (yellow-red card) 35'; Sánchez (yellow card) 28'; L. Pérez (yellow card) 45'	Report	Martínez (yellow card) 23'; Medina (yellow card) 28'; Benítez (yellow card) 37'; Jiménez 51', 75'	Stadium: Estadio Omnilife; Attendance: 41,523; Referee: José Alfredo Peñaloza

April 5, 2013 Round 13	Chiapas	3–2	Guadalajara	Tuxtla Gutiérrez, Chiapas
19:30	Rey 8'; Esqueda (yellow card) 18'; Loroña 39'; Andrade (yellow card) 69'; Arizala 80'	Report	Márquez 45+1', 64'; Sabah (yellow card) 66'; Sánchez (yellow card) 72'	Stadium: Estadio Victor Manuel Reyna; Attendance: 17,538; Referee: Fernando Guerrero

April 14, 2013 Round 14	Guadalajara	1–2	Atlante	Zapopan, Jalisco
17:00	Álvarez (yellow card) 24'; Márquez 26' (pen.); Araujo (yellow card) 77'; Sánchez (yellow card) 83'	Report	Vera (yellow card) 66'; Venegas 77'; Bizera (yellow card) 81'; Uscanga 88'	Stadium: Estadio Omnilife; Attendance: 20,842; Referee: Marco Antonio Rodríguez

April 20, 2013 Round 15	Atlas	1–0	Guadalajara	Guadalajara, Jalisco
16:00	Cufré (yellow card) 11'; Millar 29'; Chávez (yellow card) 45'	Report	Sánchez (yellow card) 1'; Márquez (yellow card) 17' (yellow-red card) 17'; Sabah (yellow card) 18'; Torres (yellow card) 90'	Stadium: Estadio Jalisco; Attendance: 46,706; Referee: Paul Delgadillo

April 28, 2013 Round 16	Guadalajara	1–2	Querétaro	Zapopan, Jalisco
17:00	S. Pérez (yellow card) 32'; Enríquez (yellow card) 40'; Coronado 67'; L. Pérez (yellow card) 81'	Report	Escoto (yellow card) 21'; Pineda (red card) 26'; S. Pérez 37' (o.g.); Cosme 52'	Stadium: Estadio Omnilife; Attendance: 18,920; Referee: Jorge Isaac Rojas

May 3, 2013 Round 17	Tijuana	4–0	Guadalajara	Tijuana, Baja California
19:30	Piceno 19'; Riascos 32'; Ruiz 41'; Martínez 45+1'; Pellerano (yellow card) 79'	Report	Álvarez (yellow card) 46'	Stadium: Estadio Caliente; Attendance: 23,173; Referee: Roberto García Orozco

Guadalajara did not qualify to the Final Phase

=== Goalscorers ===
Position	Nation	Name	Goals scored
1.	(Mexico)	Rafael Márquez Lugo	7
2.	(Mexico)	Marco Fabián	4
3.	(Mexico)	Miguel Sabah	3
4.	(Mexico)	Abraham Coronado	1
TOTAL			15

=== Results ===
==== Results summary ====
Overall								Home						Away					
Pld	W	D	L	GF	GA	GD	Pts	W	D	L	GF	GA	GD	W	D	L	GF	GA	GD
17	3	7	7	15	24	−9	16	2	3	3	8	10	−2	1	4	4	7	14	−7

Last updated: 4 May 2013.
Source: Clausura 2013 results

==== Results by round ====
Round	1	2	3	4	5	6	7	8	9	10	11	12	13	14	15	16	17
Ground	H	A	H	A	H	A	A	H	A	H	A	H	A	H	A	H	A
Result	D	L	D	D	D	W	D	W	D	W	D	L	L	L	L	L	L
Position	14	16	13	14	15	10	10	8	9	8	9	11	13	13	13	13	17

Updated to match(es) played on 5 May 2013. Source: Clausura 2013 results and mediotiempo.com
A = Away; H = Home; W = Win; D = Draw; L = Loss
