= 2013–14 C.D. Guadalajara season =

Guadalajara
2013–14 season
- Chairman: Dennis te Kloese
- Manager: Benjamin Galindo (until 18 August 2013); Juan Carlos Ortega (from 19 August – 24 November 2013); José Luis Real (from 25 November 2013 – 2 April 2014); Ricardo La Volpe (2–30 April 2014); Carlos Bustos (from 13 May 2014)
- Stadium: Estadio Omnilife
- Champions League: Group stage
- Top goalscorer: League: Apertura: All: Rafael Márquez Lugo (7)
- Highest home attendance: Apertura: Clausura:
- Lowest home attendance: Apertura: (October 2, 2012); Clausurs:
Home colours	Away colours	Third colours

The 2013–14 Guadalajara season was the 67th professional season of Mexico's top-flight football league. The season is split into two tournaments—the Torneo Apertura and the Torneo Clausura—each with identical formats and each contested by the same eighteen teams.

== Squad ==
Note: Flags indicate national team as defined under FIFA eligibility rules; some limited exceptions apply. Players may hold more than one non-FIFA nationality.

No.	Pos.	Nation	Player
1	GK	MEX	Luis Michel (vice-captain)
3	DF	MEX	Kristian Álvarez
4	DF	MEX	Héctor Reynoso (captain)
5	MF	MEX	Patricio Araujo
6	DF	MEX	Adrián Cortés
7	FW	MEX	Rafael Márquez Lugo
9	FW	MEX	Miguel Sabah
10	MF	MEX	Marco Fabián
13	DF	MEX	Abraham Coronado
14	MF	MEX	Jorge Enríquez
16	DF	MEX	Miguel Ángel Ponce
17	MF	MEX	Jesús Sánchez
19	FW	MEX	Érick Torres
21	FW	MEX	Carlos Fierro

No.	Pos.	Nation	Player
23	MF	MEX	Luis Ernesto Pérez
24	DF	MEX	Sergio Pérez
28	MF	MEX	Giovanni Hernández
36	DF	MEX	Carlos Villanueva
13	FW	MEX	Roberto Marcos Zetter
132	GK	MEX	Diego Ávila
143	DF	MEX	Víctor Perales
144	DF	MEX	Juan Basulto
145	MF	MEX	Michael Pérez
151	GK	MEX	Miguel Jiménez
155	DF	MEX	Hedgardo Marín
156	MF	MEX	Irving Ávalos
160	FW	MEX	Juan Carlos Martínez
163	MF	MEX	Luis Morales

== Torneo Apertura ==
=== Regular season ===
Win Draw Loss

==== Apertura 2013 results ====
28 July 2013 2	Chiapas	1-1	Guadalajara	Tuxtla Gutiérrez, Chiapas
21:00	Ochoa 18'	Report	Reynoso (yellow card) 75'; Sánchez (yellow card) 75'; Álvarez (yellow card) 79'; Zaldívar 90+2'	Stadium: Estadio Víctor Manuel Reyna; Referee: Jesús Morales

1 August 2013 3	Guadalajara	0-2	Tiburones Rojos de Veracruz	Zapopan, Jalisco
12:00		[ Report]	Marrugo 4', Reyna 89'	Stadium: Estadio Omnilife; Attendance: 24,00; Referee: Jorge Antonio Pérez Durán

==== Copa MX ====
July 23, 2013 1	Necaxa	1–2	Guadalajara	Aguascalientes, Aguascalientes
21:00	Sandoval (yellow card) 56'; Rodríguez (yellow card) 58'; Lillingston 84'	Report	Araujo 60'; Giovanni Hernández 77'	Stadium: Estadio Victoria; Referee: Quetzalli Alvarado

8 August 2013 2	Guadalajara	0-0	Necaxa	Guadalajara, Jalisco
19:00	Pérez (yellow card) 62'; R. López (yellow card) 72'; Villanueva (yellow card) 74'	Report	De La Cruz (yellow card) 10'; López (yellow card) 57'	Stadium: Estadio Omnilife; Referee: Luis Enrique Santander
