= 2010–11 C.D. Guadalajara season =

The 2010–11 Guadalajara season was the 64th professional season of Mexico's top-flight football league. The season is split into two tournaments—the Torneo Apertura and the Torneo Clausura—each with identical formats and each contested by the same eighteen teams. Guadalajara began their season on July 24, 2010, against Puebla, Guadalajara played their homes games on Saturdays at 7:00pm local time.

== Squad ==
As of April 24, 2010. Note: Flags indicate national team as defined under FIFA eligibility rules; some limited exceptions apply. Players may hold more than one non-FIFA nationality.

No.	Pos.	Nation	Player
1	GK	MEX	Luis Ernesto Michel (Captain)
2	DF	MEX	Mario de Luna
3	MF	MEX	Dionicio Escalante
4	DF	MEX	Héctor Reynoso (Vice-Captain)
5	DF	MEX	Patricio Araujo
6	DF	MEX	Omar Esparza
7	FW	MEX	Adolfo Bautista
8	MF	MEX	Marco Fabián
9	FW	MEX	Omar Arellano
10	FW	MEX	Alberto Medina
11	FW	MEX	Ulises Dávila

No.	Pos.	Nation	Player
13	MF	MEX	Sergio Ávila
14	FW	MEX	Jorge Enríquez
15	FW	MEX	Michel Vázquez
16	DF	MEX	Miguel Ángel Ponce
18	MF	MEX	Xavier Báez
19	DF	MEX	Jonny Magallón
20	DF	MEX	Edgar Mejía
21	DF	MEX	Christian Pérez
23	GK	MEX	Víctor Hugo Hernández
25	DF	MEX	Juan Antonio Ocampo

== Apertura 2010 results ==
=== Regular season ===
July 24, 2010 Round 1	Guadalajara	0 – 0	Puebla	Estadio Jalisco, Guadalajara
7:00pm		Report		Referee: Fernando Guerrero Ramírez

October 6, 2010 Round 2	Guadalajara	0 – 1	Morelia	Estadio Omnilife, Zapopan
12:00pm			Aldrete 78'

August 7, 2010 Round 3	San Luis	0 – 1	Guadalajara	Estadio Alfonso Lastras, San Luis Potosí
8:45pm		Report	Fabian 20'	Referee: Armando Archundia

September 5, 2010 Round 4	Guadalajara	3 – 0	Estudiantes Tecos	Estadio Omnilife, Zapopan
7:00pm	Bravo 37'; Vázquez 74'; Fabián 90'	Report

August 21, 2010 Round 5	Atlante	2 – 1	Guadalajara	Estadio Andrés Quintana Roo, Cancún
9:00pm	Torres 4'; Fano 38'	Report	Bravo 1'

August 28, 2010 Round 6	Guadalajara	0 – 0	UNAM	Estadio Omnilife, Zapopan
7:00pm		Report		Referee: Jorge Gasso

September 11, 2010 Round 7	Pachuca	1 – 1	Guadalajara	Estadio Hidalgo, Pachuca
7:00pm	Arizala 57'		Araujo 40'	Referee: Miguel Ángel Chacón

September 18, 2010 Round 8	Guadalajara	0 – 3	Chiapas	Estadio Omnilife, Zapopan
7:00pm		Report	Ochoa 14', 90+1', 90+4'	Referee: Mauricio Morales

September 26, 2010 Round 9	UANL	1 – 1	Guadalajara	Estadio Universitario, San Nicolás
12:00pm	Acuña 46'	Report	Ponce 71'	Referee: Jorge Isaac Rojas

October 3, 2010 Round 10	Guadalajara	2 – 2	Atlas	Estadio Omnilife, Zapopan
4:30pm	Ponce 31'; Vidrio 90' (o.g.)	Report	Santos 24'; Flores 76'	Referee: Roberto García

October 9, 2010 Round 11	Querétaro	2 – 2	Guadalajara	Estadio La Corregidora, Querétaro
5:00pm	López 57'; Altamirano 84' (pen.)	Report	Sánchez 59'; Fabián 74'	Referee: José Alfredo Peñaloza

October 16, 2010 Round 12	Guadalajara	1 – 0	Necaxa	Estadio Omnilife, Zapopan
7:00pm	Fabián 68'	Report		Referee: Jaime Herrera

October 24, 2010 Round 13	América	0 – 0	Guadalajara	Estadio Azteca, Mexico City
5:00pm		Report		Referee: Francisco Chacón

October 27, 2010 Round 14	Guadalajara	0 – 0	Toluca	Estadio Omnilife, Zapopan
8:30pm		Report		Referee: Jorge Gasso

October 30, 2010 Round 15	Santos Laguna	1 – 1	Guadalajara	Estadio Corona, Torreón
7:00pm	Benítez 87'	Report	Arellano 89'	Referee: Miguel Ángel Ayala

November 6, 2010 Round 16	Guadalajara	0 – 0	Cruz Azul	Estadio Omnilife, Zapopan
7:00pm		Report		Referee: Rafael Medina

November 13, 2010 Round 17	Monterrey	2 – 3	Guadalajara	Estadio Tecnológico, Monterrey
5:00pm	de Nigris 11'; Ayoví 33'		Arellano 55'; Fabián 66', 90+1'	Referee: Miguel Ángel Flores

=== Goalscorers ===
Position	Nation	Name	Goals scored
1	(Mexico)	Marco Fabián	7
2	(Mexico)	Omar Arellano	2
1	(Mexico)	Omar Bravo	2
1	(Mexico)	Miguel Ángel Ponce	2
2	(Mexico)	Patricio Araujo	1
2	(Mexico)	Xavier Báez	1
2	(Mexico)	Michel Vázquez	1
2	(Mexico)	Jesús Enrique Sánchez	1
2		Own Goal	1
TOTAL			17

== Transfers ==
=== In ===
#	Pos	Player	From	Fee	Date	Notes

=== Out ===
Pos	Player	To	Fee	Date	Notes
FW	(Mexico) Javier Hernández	(England) Manchester United	Undisclosed	April 8, 2010	

=== Results ===
==== Results summary ====
Overall								Home						Away					
Pld	W	D	L	GF	GA	GD	Pts	W	D	L	GF	GA	GD	W	D	L	GF	GA	GD
17	4	10	3	16	15	+1	22	2	5	2	6	6	0	2	5	1	10	9	+1

Last updated: 12 January 2011.
Source: Apertura 2010 results

==== Results by round ====
Round	1	2	3	4	5	6	7	8	9	10	11	12	13	14	15	16	17
Ground	H	H	A	H	A	H	A	H	A	H	A	H	A	H	A	H	A
Result	D	L	W	W	L	D	D	L	D	D	D	W	D	D	D	D	W
Position	11	11	9	11	13	13	10	13	13	13	14	12	11	11	11	12	10

Updated to match(es) played on 12 January 2011. Source: Apertuar 2010 results and mediotiempo.com
A = Away; H = Home; W = Win; D = Draw; L = Loss

== Tornero Clausura ==
=== Squad ===
Note: Flags indicate national team as defined under FIFA eligibility rules; some limited exceptions apply. Players may hold more than one non-FIFA nationality.

No.	Pos.	Nation	Player
1	GK	MEX	Luis Ernesto Michel (vice-captain)
2	DF	MEX	Mario de Luna
3	MF	MEX	Dionicio Escalante
4	DF	MEX	Héctor Reynoso (captain)
5	DF	MEX	Patricio Araujo
6	DF	MEX	Omar Esparza
7	FW	MEX	Adolfo Bautista
8	MF	MEX	Marco Fabián
9	FW	MEX	Omar Arellano
10	FW	MEX	Alberto Medina
11	FW	MEX	Ulises Dávila

No.	Pos.	Nation	Player
14	MF	MEX	Jorge Enríquez
15	FW	MEX	Michel Vázquez
16	DF	MEX	Miguel Ángel Ponce
18	MF	MEX	Xavier Báez
19	DF	MEX	Jonny Magallón
20	DF	MEX	Edgar Mejía
21	DF	MEX	Christian Pérez
23	GK	MEX	Víctor Hugo Hernández
57	MF	MEX	Kristian Álvarez
44	FW	MEX	Jesús Sánchez García
67	FW	MEX	Erick Torres Padilla

=== Out on loan ===
Note: Flags indicate national team as defined under FIFA eligibility rules; some limited exceptions apply. Players may hold more than one non-FIFA nationality.

No.	Pos.	Nation	Player
—	MF	MEX	Diego Martínez (to Veracruz)
—	MF	MEX	Sergio Amaury Ponce (to San Luis)
—	MF	MEX	Gonzalo Pineda (to Cruz Azul)

No.	Pos.	Nation	Player
—	MF	MEX	Édgar Solís (to Atlante)
—	FW	MEX	Jesús Padilla (to Chivas USA)

=== Regular season ===
January 9, 2011 Round 1	Puebla	1 – 1	Guadalajara	Estadio Cuauhtémoc, Puebla
12:00pm	Borja 54'	Report	Lugo 8' (o.g.)	Referee: Ricardo Arellano

January 16, 2011 Round 2	Morelia	1 – 1	Guadalajara	Estadio Morelos, Morelia
12:00pm	Márquez 71'	Report	Fabián 21'	Referee: Juan Genaro Medrano

January 22, 2011 Round 3	Guadalajara	1 – 1	San Luis	Estadio Omnilife, Zapopan
7:00pm	Torres 66'	Report	Matellán 76'	Referee: Erim Ramírez

January 28, 2011 Round 4	Estudiantes Tecos	1 – 0	Guadalajara	Estadio Tres de Marzo, Zapopan
8:10pm	Lillingston 90+3'	Report		Referee: Roberto García

February 5, 2011 Round 5	Guadalajara	2 – 0	Atlante	Estadio Jalisco, Guadalajara
9:00pm	Araujo 87'; Reynoso 90+4' (pen.)	Report		Referee: Mauricio Morales

February 13, 2011 Round 6	UNAM	1 – 1	Guadalajara	Estadio Olímpico Universitario, Mexico City
12:00pm	cortés 79'	Report	Báez 78'	Referee: Jorge Macías Romo

February 19, 2011 Round 7	Guadalajara	4 – 1	Pachuca	Estadio Omnilife, Zapopan
7:00pm	Mora 1'; Medina 12', 59'; Torres 34'	Report	Benítez 47'	Referee: Miguel Ángel Ayala

February 26, 2011 Round 8	Chiapas	1 – 0	Guadalajara	Estadio Victor Manuel Reyna, Tuxtla Gutierrez
5:00pm	Frias 8'	Report		Referee: Francisco Chacón

March 5, 2011 Round 9	Guadalajara	0 – 0	UANL	Estadio Omnilife, Zapopan
7:00pm		Report		Referee: Marco Antonio Rodríguez

March 12, 2011 Round 10	Atlas	1 – 1	Guadalajara	Estadio Jalisco, Guadalajara
8:45pm	Santos 66'	Report	Torres 11'	Referee: Ricardo Arellano

March 19, 2011 Round 11	Guadalajara	2 – 0	Querétaro	Estadio Omnilife, Zapopan
7:00pm	Torres 5', 71'	Report		Referee: Juan Genaro Medrano

April 1, 2011 Round 12	Necaxa	1 – 2	Guadalajara	Estadio Victoria, Aguascalientes
8:10pm	Blanco 6'	Report	Báez 2'; Fabián 70'	Referee: Mauricio Morales

April 10, 2011 Round 13	Guadalajara	3 – 0	América	Estadio Omnilife, Zapopan
8:00pm	Torres 28'; Fabián 72', 79'	Report		Referee: Erim Ramírez

April 13, 2011 Round 14	Toluca	1 – 2	Guadalajara	Estadio Nemesio Díez, Toluca
7:00pm	Reynoso 15' (o.g.)	Report	Fabián 12'; Báez 67'	Referee: Francisco Chacón

April 16, 2011 Round 15	Guadalajara	0 – 1	Santos Laguna	Estadio Omnilife, Zapopan
7:00pm		Report	Baloy 90+2'	Referee: Paul Delgadillo

April 23, 2011 Round 16	Cruz Azul	1 – 1	Guadalajara	Estadio Azul, Mexico City
5:00pm	Villa 81'	Report	Fabián 45'	Referee: Marco Antonio Rodríguez

April 30, 2011 Round 17	Guadalajara	2 – 3	Monterrey	Estadio Omnilife, Zapopan
7:00pm	Fabián 3', 82'	Report	Osorio 45'; Zavala 72'; Ayoví 89'	Referee: Miguel Ángel Ortega

==== Final phase ====
May 4, 2011 Quarterfinals	Guadalajara	3 – 1	UANL	Estadio Omnilife, Zapopan
7:00pm	Arellano 40' de Luna 58'; Fabián 66' (pen.)	Report	Molina 48'	Referee: Ricardo Arellano

May 7, 2011 Quarterfinals	UANL	1 – 1	Guadalajara	Estadio Universitario, San Nicolás
7:00pm	Mancilla 64'	Report	Reynoso 79'	Referee: Mauricio Morales

Guadalajara won 4–2 on aggregate

May 12, 2011 Quarterfinals	Guadalajara	1 – 1	UNAM	Estadio Omnilife, Zapopan
7:00pm	Arellano 89'	Report	Velarde 51'	Referee: Paul Delgadillo

May 15, 2011 Quarterfinals	UNAM	2 – 0	Guadalajara	Estadio Olímpico Universitario, Mexico City
12:00pm	Cortés 42'; López 75'	Report		Referee: Roberto García Orozco

UNAM won 3–1 on aggregate

=== Friendlies ===
February 15, 2011	Guadalajara (Mexico)	3 – 2	(United States) New York	Estadio Omnilife, Zapopan, Mexico
21:00	Fabián (yellow card) 35'; Álvarez (yellow card) 43'; Jesús Sánchez 71'; Mendes 80' (o.g.); Dávila (yellow card) 90+1'; Jorge Mora 90+3'	(Report)	29' (yellow card) 80' (yellow-red card) 85' Richards; 39' Agudelo	Referee: Roman Rafael Medina

=== Goalscorers ===
Position	Nation	Name	Goals scored
1	(Mexico)	Marco Fabián	9
2	(Mexico)	Erick Torres	6
3	(Mexico)	Xavier Báez	3
4	(Mexico)	Omar Arellano	2
4	(Mexico)	Alberto Medina	2
4	(Mexico)	Héctor Reynoso	2
7	(Mexico)	Mario de Luna	1
7	(Mexico)	Jorge Mora	1
7	(Mexico)	Patricio Araujo	1
7		Own Goal	1
TOTAL			28

=== Results ===
==== Results summary ====
Overall								Home						Away					
Pld	W	D	L	GF	GA	GD	Pts	W	D	L	GF	GA	GD	W	D	L	GF	GA	GD
17	6	7	4	23	15	+8	25	4	2	2	14	6	+8	2	5	2	9	9	0

Last updated: 6 May 2011.
Source: Clausura 2011 results

==== Results by round ====
Round	1	2	3	4	5	6	7	8	9	10	11	12	13	14	15	16	17
Ground	A	A	H	A	H	A	H	A	H	A	H	A	H	A	H	A	H
Result	D	D	D	L	W	D	W	L	D	D	W	W	W	W	L	D	L
Position	10	11	13	16	10	12	7	9	10	11	9	7	4	4	4	4	8

Updated to match(es) played on 6 May 2011. Source: Clausura 2011 results
A = Away; H = Home; W = Win; D = Draw; L = Loss
