= List of Mexican football transfers winter 2014–15 =

This is a list of Mexican football transfers in the Mexican Primera Division during the winter 2014-15 transfer window, grouped by club. It only includes football transfers related to clubs from Liga MX, the first division of Mexican football.

== Mexican Primera Division ==
=== América ===
In: Note: Flags indicate national team as defined under FIFA eligibility rules; some limited exceptions apply. Players may hold more than one non-FIFA nationality.

No.	Pos.	Nation	Player
3	FW	(Colombia) COL	Darwin Quintero (from Santos Laguna)
5	MF	(Argentina) ARG	Cristian Pellerano (from Tijuana)
6	DF	(Paraguay) PAR	Miguel Samudio (from (Paraguay) Libertad, previously on loan at (Brazil) Cruzeiro)
9	FW	(Argentina) ARG	Darío Benedetto (from Tijuana)

Out: Note: Flags indicate national team as defined under FIFA eligibility rules; some limited exceptions apply. Players may hold more than one non-FIFA nationality.

No.	Pos.	Nation	Player
5	MF	(Mexico) MEX	Jesús Molina (to Santos Laguna)
6	DF	(Mexico) MEX	Juan Carlos Valenzuela (to Atlas)
7	MF	(Mexico) MEX	Luis Ángel Mendoza (to Santos Laguna)
18	FW	(Colombia) COL	Luis Gabriel Rey (to Puebla)
19	MF	(Mexico) MEX	Miguel Layún (to (England) Watford, on loan from (Spain) Granada)

=== Atlas ===
In: Note: Flags indicate national team as defined under FIFA eligibility rules; some limited exceptions apply. Players may hold more than one non-FIFA nationality.

No.	Pos.	Nation	Player
6	DF	(Mexico) MEX	Juan Carlos Valenzuela (from América)

Out: Note: Flags indicate national team as defined under FIFA eligibility rules; some limited exceptions apply. Players may hold more than one non-FIFA nationality.

No.	Pos.	Nation	Player

=== Chiapas ===
In: Note: Flags indicate national team as defined under FIFA eligibility rules; some limited exceptions apply. Players may hold more than one non-FIFA nationality.

No.	Pos.	Nation	Player

Out: Note: Flags indicate national team as defined under FIFA eligibility rules; some limited exceptions apply. Players may hold more than one non-FIFA nationality.

No.	Pos.	Nation	Player

=== Cruz Azul ===
In: Note: Flags indicate national team as defined under FIFA eligibility rules; some limited exceptions apply. Players may hold more than one non-FIFA nationality.

No.	Pos.	Nation	Player
8	FW	(Brazil) BRA	Alemão (on loan from (Brazil) Ponte Preta, previously on loan at (Brazil) Portuguesa)
9	FW	(Paraguay) PAR	Roque Santa Cruz (from (Spain) Málaga)
—	DF	(Mexico) MEX	Francisco Flores (loan return from Guadalajara)

Out: Note: Flags indicate national team as defined under FIFA eligibility rules; some limited exceptions apply. Players may hold more than one non-FIFA nationality.

No.	Pos.	Nation	Player

=== Guadalajara ===
In: Note: Flags indicate national team as defined under FIFA eligibility rules; some limited exceptions apply. Players may hold more than one non-FIFA nationality.

No.	Pos.	Nation	Player
13	DF	(Mexico) MEX	Carlos Salcedo (from (United States) Real Salt Lake)
16	DF	(Mexico) MEX	Miguel Ángel Ponce (loan return from Toluca)
18	MF	(Mexico) MEX	Isaác Brizuela (from Toluca)
26	MF	(Mexico) MEX	Raúl López (loan return from Tepic)
31	FW	(Mexico) MEX	Erick Torres (on loan from (United States) Houston Dynamo)
33	MF	(Mexico) MEX	Marco Fabián (loan return from Cruz Azul)

Out: Note: Flags indicate national team as defined under FIFA eligibility rules; some limited exceptions apply. Players may hold more than one non-FIFA nationality.

No.	Pos.	Nation	Player
13	MF	(Mexico) MEX	Sergio Nápoles (on loan to Toluca)
16	DF	(Mexico) MEX	Carlos Gerardo Rodríguez (loan return to Toluca)
18	DF	(Mexico) MEX	Édgar Solís (on loan to UANL)
85	MF	(Mexico) MEX	Julio Gómez (loan return to Pachuca)
86	DF	(Mexico) MEX	Francisco Flores (loan return to Cruz Azul)
87	FW	(Mexico) MEX	Ángel Zaldívar (on loan to Tepic)
—	GK	(Mexico) MEX	Sergio Arias (on loan to Mérida, previously on loan at Tepic)
—	MF	(Mexico) MEX	Giovani Casillas (on loan to Tepic, previously on loan at Chiapas)
—	DF	(Mexico) MEX	Abraham Coronado (on loan to Toluca, previously on loan at Tepic)
—	MF	(Mexico) MEX	Édgar Mejía (on loan to Atl. San Luis, previously on loan at Puebla)
—	DF	(Mexico) MEX	Héctor Reynoso (to UDG, previously on loan)

=== León ===
In: Note: Flags indicate national team as defined under FIFA eligibility rules; some limited exceptions apply. Players may hold more than one non-FIFA nationality.

No.	Pos.	Nation	Player

Out: Note: Flags indicate national team as defined under FIFA eligibility rules; some limited exceptions apply. Players may hold more than one non-FIFA nationality.

No.	Pos.	Nation	Player

=== Monterrey ===
In: Note: Flags indicate national team as defined under FIFA eligibility rules; some limited exceptions apply. Players may hold more than one non-FIFA nationality.

No.	Pos.	Nation	Player

Out: Note: Flags indicate national team as defined under FIFA eligibility rules; some limited exceptions apply. Players may hold more than one non-FIFA nationality.

No.	Pos.	Nation	Player

=== Morelia ===
In: Note: Flags indicate national team as defined under FIFA eligibility rules; some limited exceptions apply. Players may hold more than one non-FIFA nationality.

No.	Pos.	Nation	Player

Out: Note: Flags indicate national team as defined under FIFA eligibility rules; some limited exceptions apply. Players may hold more than one non-FIFA nationality.

No.	Pos.	Nation	Player

=== Pachuca ===
In: Note: Flags indicate national team as defined under FIFA eligibility rules; some limited exceptions apply. Players may hold more than one non-FIFA nationality.

No.	Pos.	Nation	Player
—	MF	(Mexico) MEX	Julio Gómez (loan return from Guadalajara)

Out: Note: Flags indicate national team as defined under FIFA eligibility rules; some limited exceptions apply. Players may hold more than one non-FIFA nationality.

No.	Pos.	Nation	Player
—	MF	(Mexico) MEX	Julio Gómez (on loan to UAT)

=== Puebla ===
In: Note: Flags indicate national team as defined under FIFA eligibility rules; some limited exceptions apply. Players may hold more than one non-FIFA nationality.

No.	Pos.	Nation	Player
21	FW	(Colombia) COL	Luis Gabriel Rey (from América)

Out: Note: Flags indicate national team as defined under FIFA eligibility rules; some limited exceptions apply. Players may hold more than one non-FIFA nationality.

No.	Pos.	Nation	Player

=== Querétaro ===
In: Note: Flags indicate national team as defined under FIFA eligibility rules; some limited exceptions apply. Players may hold more than one non-FIFA nationality.

No.	Pos.	Nation	Player

Out: Note: Flags indicate national team as defined under FIFA eligibility rules; some limited exceptions apply. Players may hold more than one non-FIFA nationality.

No.	Pos.	Nation	Player

=== Santos Laguna ===
In: Note: Flags indicate national team as defined under FIFA eligibility rules; some limited exceptions apply. Players may hold more than one non-FIFA nationality.

No.	Pos.	Nation	Player
4	MF	(Mexico) MEX	Jesús Molina (from América)
9	MF	(Mexico) MEX	Luis Ángel Mendoza (from América)

Out: Note: Flags indicate national team as defined under FIFA eligibility rules; some limited exceptions apply. Players may hold more than one non-FIFA nationality.

No.	Pos.	Nation	Player
3	FW	(Colombia) COL	Carlos Quintero (to América)

=== Tijuana ===
In: Note: Flags indicate national team as defined under FIFA eligibility rules; some limited exceptions apply. Players may hold more than one non-FIFA nationality.

No.	Pos.	Nation	Player

Out: Note: Flags indicate national team as defined under FIFA eligibility rules; some limited exceptions apply. Players may hold more than one non-FIFA nationality.

No.	Pos.	Nation	Player
10	FW	(Argentina) ARG	Darío Benedetto (to América)
16	MF	(Argentina) ARG	Cristian Pellerano (to América)

=== Toluca ===
In: Note: Flags indicate national team as defined under FIFA eligibility rules; some limited exceptions apply. Players may hold more than one non-FIFA nationality.

No.	Pos.	Nation	Player
6	DF	(Mexico) MEX	Carlos Gerardo Rodríguez (loan return from Guadalajara)
14	DF	(Mexico) MEX	Abraham Coronado (on loan from Guadalajara, previously on loan at Tepic)
18	MF	(Mexico) MEX	Sergio Nápoles (on loan from Guadalajara)

Out: Note: Flags indicate national team as defined under FIFA eligibility rules; some limited exceptions apply. Players may hold more than one non-FIFA nationality.

No.	Pos.	Nation	Player

=== UANL ===
In: Note: Flags indicate national team as defined under FIFA eligibility rules; some limited exceptions apply. Players may hold more than one non-FIFA nationality.

No.	Pos.	Nation	Player
—	DF	(Mexico) MEX	Édgar Solís (on loan from Guadalajara)

Out: Note: Flags indicate national team as defined under FIFA eligibility rules; some limited exceptions apply. Players may hold more than one non-FIFA nationality.

No.	Pos.	Nation	Player

=== UDG ===
In: Note: Flags indicate national team as defined under FIFA eligibility rules; some limited exceptions apply. Players may hold more than one non-FIFA nationality.

No.	Pos.	Nation	Player
4	DF	(Mexico) MEX	Héctor Reynoso (from Guadalajara, previously on loan)

Out: Note: Flags indicate national team as defined under FIFA eligibility rules; some limited exceptions apply. Players may hold more than one non-FIFA nationality.

No.	Pos.	Nation	Player

=== UNAM ===
In: Note: Flags indicate national team as defined under FIFA eligibility rules; some limited exceptions apply. Players may hold more than one non-FIFA nationality.

No.	Pos.	Nation	Player

Out: Note: Flags indicate national team as defined under FIFA eligibility rules; some limited exceptions apply. Players may hold more than one non-FIFA nationality.

No.	Pos.	Nation	Player

=== Veracruz ===
In: Note: Flags indicate national team as defined under FIFA eligibility rules; some limited exceptions apply. Players may hold more than one non-FIFA nationality.

No.	Pos.	Nation	Player

Out: Note: Flags indicate national team as defined under FIFA eligibility rules; some limited exceptions apply. Players may hold more than one non-FIFA nationality.

No.	Pos.	Nation	Player

== See also ==
- 2014–15 Liga MX season
