= Erick Torres (footballer, born 1993) =

Mexican footballer

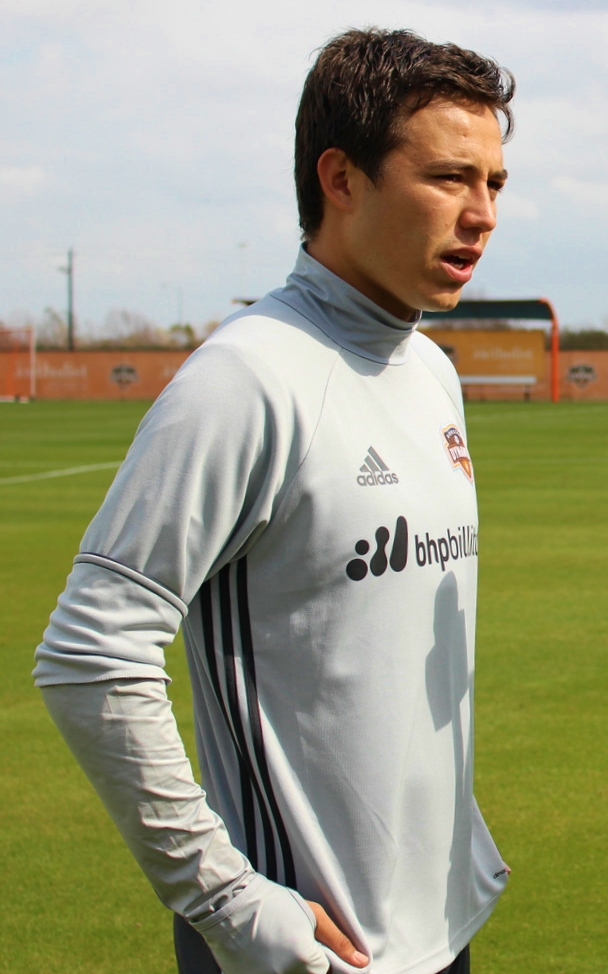
- Torres training with the Houston Dynamo in 2016

Personal information
- Full name: Erick Estéfano Torres Padilla
- Date of birth: 19 January 1993 (age 33)
- Place of birth: Guadalajara, Jalisco, Mexico
- Height: 1.83 m (6 ft 0 in)
- Position: Striker

Team information
- Current team: Sporting

Youth career
- 2001–2010: Guadalajara

Senior career*
Years	Team	Apps	(Gls)
2010–2014	Guadalajara	65	(14)
2013–2014	→ Chivas USA (loan)	44	(22)
2015–2017	Houston Dynamo	49	(14)
2015	→ Guadalajara (loan)	5	(2)
2016	→ Cruz Azul (loan)	3	(0)
2018	UNAM	5	(0)
2018–2020	Tijuana	25	(4)
2020–2021	Atlanta United	33	(1)
2022	Orange County SC	33	(9)
2023	Las Vegas Lights	14	(2)
2023	Guanacasteca	22	(11)
2024–2025	Herediano	0	(0)
2025–	Sporting	0	

International career
2010	Mexico U17	4	(0)
2011	Mexico U20	8	(1)
2012–2016	Mexico U23	10	(6)
2014–2017	Mexico	7	(1)
Medal record
Men's football
Representing Mexico
Olympic Qualifying Championship
Winner	2015 United States
Winner	2012 United States
FIFA U-20 World Cup
Third place	2011 Colombia	Team
- * Club domestic league appearances and goals as of 26 November 2024

Erick Estéfano Torres Padilla (born 19 January 1993) is a Mexican professional footballer who plays as a striker. He is nicknamed "El Cubo" (The Cube) due to his large, cubical shaped head.

== Club career ==
=== Guadalajara ===
Born in Guadalajara, Jalisco, Mexico, Torres came into the Guadalajara first team in 2010 and was a promising young player at the club. After being captain of the Chivas U-17 team, taking them to the championship game of the Bicentenario 2010, He made his official debut in the Mexican Primera División in November 2010 against C.F. Monterrey, where he scored 21 minutes into the second half. Chivas would go on to tie the game 1–1. He scored a brace against Pachuca, where Chivas would win the match 4–1. He scored in his first "Super Clasico" on 10 April 2011 against arch-rivals América in a shock 3–0 victory. After the Clausura 2011 season, he finished with 6 goals in 19 appearances, and the club's second top goal scorer, behind Marco Fabián.

==== Chivas USA (loan) ====
Erick Torres was loaned to sister club Chivas USA from Guadalajara on 10 July 2013, and was signed as a designated player.

Torres made his debut with Chivas in July 2013 against Toronto FC scoring the winning goal during the 79th minute. He played all 90 minutes. On 29 June 2014 Torres scored his 17th career goal with Chivas USA and became Major League Soccer's all-time Mexican-born scoring leader. On 20 July 2014, Torres tied Ante Razov's club record of 14 goals in a single season while being in a 6 match goal streak. On 5 August 2014, Torres was chosen for the MLS All Star team facing against Bayern München. Torres came in off the bench for Obafemi Martins in the 60th minute. The match resulted in 2–1 win. Torres finished the 2014 MLS season with 15 goals scored in 29 games. During his time with Chivas he scored a total of 22 goals in 45 games before the club was dissolved in 2014.

=== Houston Dynamo ===
On 18 December 2014, Guadalajara announced that MLS made the purchase clause effective to move Torres permanently to the MLS under the condition that Guadalajara acquire Torres on loan for six months.

On 23 December 2014, Houston Dynamo announced that they had signed Torres to a Designated Player contract. The contract is for five years.

==== Guadalajara (loan) ====
Torres was loaned back to Guadalajara for six months as part of the agreement made with MLS. He made his return debut for the club at home against Pumas UNAM coming in as a substitute for Ángel Reyna. Guadalajara won the match by a score of 2–1.

On 14 March 2015, Torres scored his first two and only league goals of the season coming on as a substitute in the 60th minute for Israel Castro against Puebla.

Torres played mostly in the Copa MX where he scored three goals and helped Guadalajara reach the final where they lost 4–2 to Puebla.

==== Cruz Azul (loan) ====
On 3 September 2016, Cruz Azul announced that Torres would join the club on loan for the remaining season of the Liga MX with an option to buy.

=== Return to Houston Dynamo ===
After spending six months on loan with Guadalajara, Torres returned to Houston Dynamo of Major League Soccer to make his debut with the team. He made his debut for Dynamo in the 2015 Lamar Hunt U.S. Open Cup on 21 July 2015, when he came off the bench as a sub in the 63rd minute in a 3–1 loss to Sporting Kansas City. He made his official league debut as a sub once again for Will Bruin in the 69th minute on 25 July 2015, against LA Galaxy in a 3–0 win. After going 22 games without scoring a single goal, Houston Dynamo decided to loan Cubo to Cruz Azul for the remainder of the year. After returning from Cruz Azul, Torres made his appearance back with Houston Dynamo in their first game of the 2017 Major League Soccer season on 5 March 2017. He turned out to score his first goal with the Houston Dynamo in their 2–1 away win against Seattle Sounders FC. On 1 April 2017, Torres scored a hat-trick against New York Red Bulls on their 4–1 home win. The hat-trick was his first of his career and it made him the second ever Mexican player to score a hat-trick in the MLS. On August 23, 2017, in a match against rivals FC Dallas, Torres set a club record for most goals in a season, 14, beating Brian Ching's previous record of 13.

=== UNAM ===
On 24 January 2018, Torres joined Mexican club Pumas UNAM in a reported $2 million deal.

=== Tijuana ===
On 5 June 2018, Torres was sold to Club Tijuana.

=== Atlanta United ===
On 31 July 2020, Torres returned to Major League Soccer, joining Atlanta United FC as a Season-Ending Injury Replacement Player for the injured Josef Martínez. On August 22, 2020, Torres made his debut against Nashville SC, which resulted in a 2–0 win for Atlanta. Torres entered the match as a substitute in the 80th minute for Atlanta teammate Adam Jahn. Following the 2020 season, Torres was released by Atlanta on 24 November 2020.

On 3 February 2021, it was announced that Torres had re-signed with Atlanta United, occupying a supplemental roster spot for the season, as well as also taking on an undefined role in the club's academy.

Following the 2021 season, Atlanta declined their contract option on Torres.

=== Orange County SC ===
On 13 January 2022, Torres signed with USL Championship club Orange County SC.

=== Las Vegas Lights FC ===
On 7 March 2023, Torres signed with USL Championship club Las Vegas Lights FC.

== International career ==
=== Youth ===
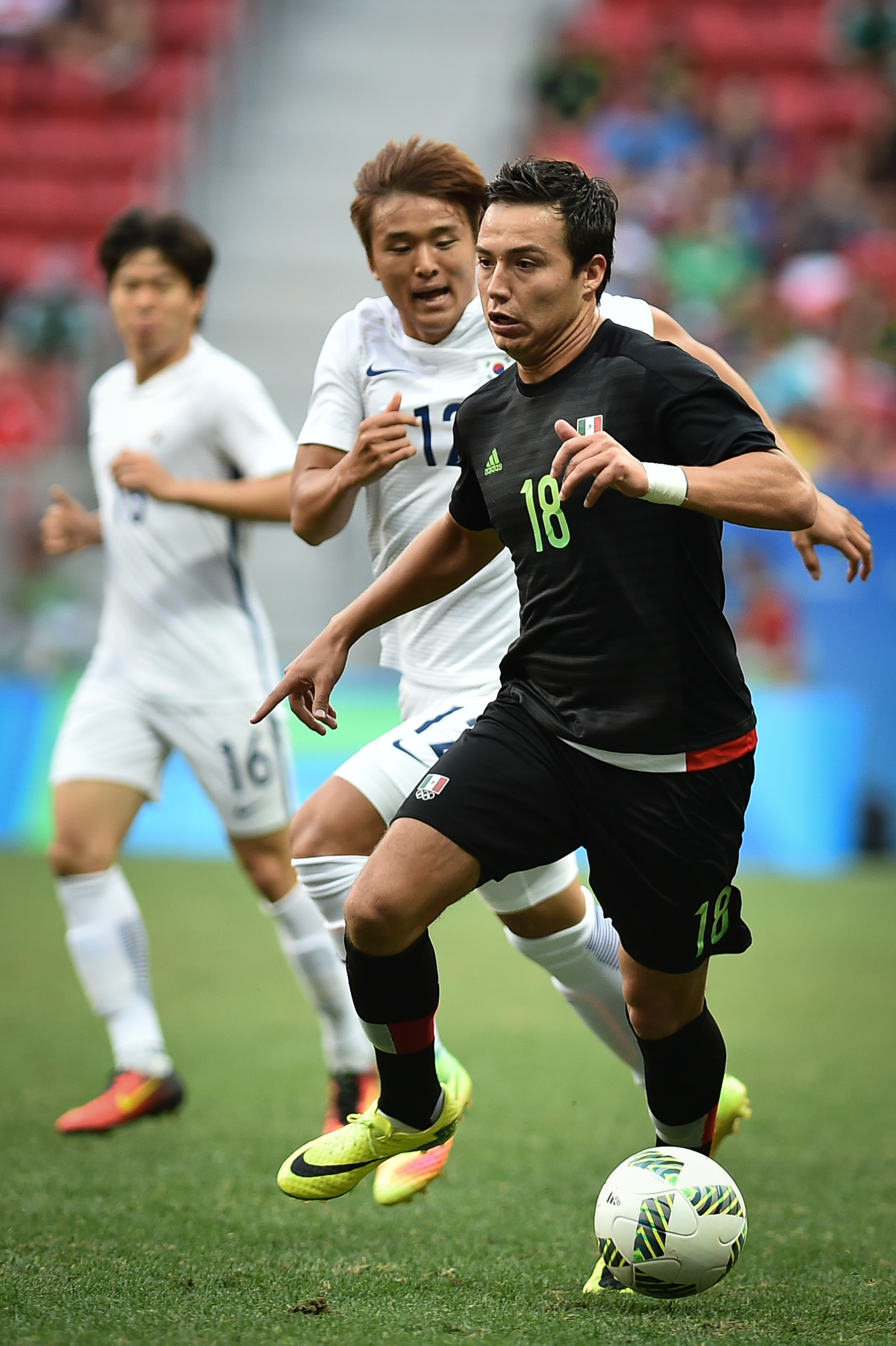
Torres playing against South Korea at the 2016 Summer Olympics

Erick Torres participated In the 2010 Milk Cup at the age of 16. He was the starting forward of the under-17 squad, finalizing 4th place in the tournament.

Torres participated in the 2011 Toulon Tournament with Mexico, finalizing in 4th place after losing to Italy on penalties in the Third Place Match. Erick Torres was included in the squad that represented Mexico at the 2011 FIFA U-20 World Cup in Colombia, he was listed as the youngest player in the team at the age of 18, And wore the number 10. Mexico reached 3rd place in the tournament.

In 2012 Torres Participated in the 2012 CONCACAF Men's Olympic Qualifying Tournament with the Mexico U23 national team, appearing 3 times and scoring one goal against Panama in extra time winning the match 1–0. Mexico won the Tournament defeating Honduras in the Final. However Erick did not make the final cut for those players participating in the 2012 Summer Olympics where Mexico won its first olympic gold medal in football.

On 18 September 2015 Erick Torres was selected by coach Raul Gutierrez to play in the 2015 CONCACAF Men's Olympic Qualifying Championship

=== Senior ===
Erick Torres was in the preliminary list of players participating in the 2011 Copa América in Argentina under coach Luis Fernando Tena. He was listed as the youngest player on the list at only 18 years old, but didn't make it to the final cut.

On 21 August 2014, Torres received his first call-up to the senior national team under coach Miguel Herrera, for two matches against Chile on 6 September and Bolivia on 9 September. On 12 October 2014, Torres scored his first goal with the national team in a friendly versus Panama in Queretaro on a mistake from the Panamanian goalkeeper. Torres was also assisted with a header by Oribe Peralta. It was the game-winning goal in the 89th minute of the match.

After a two-year absence, Torres was called up to replace the injured Alan Pulido for the 2017 CONCACAF Gold Cup. He would go on to play three games in the tournament.

== Style of play ==
He has been compared to Javier Hernández due to their similarity in their style of playing and his rapid success months after his debut, but he has mentioned that it is only the beginning of his career and he has to make his own path in football. On the Chivas official website, he was described as having a good presence in the area and an outstanding shot at goal.

An article written on Goal.com described Torres as "having quick feet, good positional sense and plenty of skill. He shares one trait particularly in common with Hernandez in that he likes to move the ball quickly, playing one and two touch football and then, like Chicharito, comes alive in the penalty area."

Erick Torres was nominated as La nueva Promesa' (The New Pledge) for the year 2012 during the 2012 Premios Juventud but lost to Boxer Saúl Álvarez.

== Career statistics ==
=== Club ===
As of 2 July 2023

Appearances and goals by club, season and competition
Club	Season	League			National cup (Note: Includes Copa MX and U.S. Open Cup)		League cup (Note: Appearances in MLS Cup Playoffs)		Continental		Total	
Club	Season	Division	Apps	Goals	Apps	Goals	Apps	Goals	Apps	Goals	Apps	Goals
Guadalajara	2010–11	Liga MX	20	6	—		—		—		20	6
Guadalajara	2011–12	Liga MX	25	7	—		—		3 (Note: Appearances in Copa Libertadores)	0	28	7
Guadalajara	2012–13	Liga MX	20	1	—		—		3 (Note: Appearances in CONCACAF Champions League)	1	23	2
Guadalajara	Total		65	14	—		—		6	1	71	15
Chivas USA	2013	Major League Soccer	15	7	—		—		—		15	7
Chivas USA	2014	Major League Soccer	29	15	1	0	—		—		30	15
Chivas USA	Total		44	22	1	0	—		—		45	22
Guadalajara	2014–15	Liga MX	5	2	9	3	—		—		14	5
Houston Dynamo	2015	Major League Soccer	11	0	1	0	—		—		12	0
Houston Dynamo	2016	Major League Soccer	11	0	—		—		—		11	0
Houston Dynamo	2017	Major League Soccer	27	14	—		4	0	—		31	14
Houston Dynamo	Total		49	14	1	0	4	0	—		54	14
Cruz Azul (loan)	2016–17	Liga MX	3	0	—		—		—		3	0
UNAM	2017–18	Liga MX	5	0	3	2	—		—		8	2
Tijuana	2018–19	Liga MX	13	1	5	1	—		—		18	2
Tijuana	2019–20	Liga MX	12	3	6	2	—		1 (Note: Appearance in Leagues Cup)	0	19	5
Tijuana	Total		25	4	11	3	—		1	0	37	7
Atlanta United FC	2020	Major League Soccer	13	1	—		—		1	0	14	1
Atlanta United FC	2021	Major League Soccer	20	0	—		—		2	0	22	0
Atlanta United FC	Total		33	1	—		—		3	0	36	1
Orange County	2022	USL Championship	33	9	2	1	—		—		35	10
Las Vegas Lights	2023	USL Championship	14	2	1	0	—		—		15	2
Guanacasteca	2023–24	Liga FPD	19	10	—		—		—		19	10
Career totals			295	78	28	9	4	0	10	1	337	88

=== International ===
As of match played 23 July 2017

National team	Year	Apps	Goals
Mexico	2014	3	1
Mexico	2015	1	0
Mexico	2017	3	0
Total		7	1

#	Date	Venue	Opponent	Score	Result	Competition
1.	12 October 2014	Estadio La Corregidora, Santiago de Querétaro, Mexico	Panama	1–0	1–0	Friendly

== Honours ==
Mexico Youth

- FIFA U-20 World Cup third place: 2011
- Central American and Caribbean Games: 2014
- CONCACAF Olympic Qualifying Championship: 2012, 2015

Individual

- MLS All-Star: 2014
- CONCACAF Olympic Qualifying Championship Best XI: 2015
