= Antonio Gallardo =

Mexican footballer (born 1989)

Personal information
- Full name: Antonio Gallardo Palacios
- Date of birth: 19 April 1989 (age 37)
- Place of birth: Guadalajara, Jalisco, Mexico
- Height: 1.81 m (5 ft 11 in)
- Position: Midfielder

Youth career
- 2007–2011: Guadalajara

Senior career*
Years	Team	Apps	(Gls)
2008	Tapatío	0	(0)
2011–2015	Guadalajara	38	(4)
2013	→ Querétaro (loan)	11	(0)
2015–2016	→ Necaxa (loan)	3	(0)
Total		52	(4)

International career
2011	Mexico U23	4	(1)
- * Club domestic league appearances and goals

Antonio Gallardo Palacios (Note: In this Mexican name, the surname is Gallardo and the second or maternal family name is Palacios.) (born 19 April 1989) is a Mexican former footballer who last played as a midfielder for Club Necaxa on loan from C.D. Guadalajara.

== Club career ==
Gallardo made his debut with Club Deportivo Guadalajara against Pachuca on 19 February 2011.
