= Ricardo Arellano =

Mexican football referee

- Full name: Ricardo Arellano Nieves
- Born: May 5, 1976 (age 50); Aguascalientes City, Mexico

Domestic
| Years | League | Role |
| 2003– | FEMEXFUT | Referee |

International
| Years | League | Role |
| 2010– | FIFA-listed | Referee |

Ricardo Arellano Nieves (born May 5, 1976 in Aguascalientes City) is a Mexican football referee who became professional in 2003.

His debut at the Primera Division de Mexico was in 2007.

He won the "Balon de Oro" in Mexico and got his distinction as an international referee in 2010 (Mexican FIFA Referees).

Up to now, Arellano Nieves has officiated more than 130 matches as a central referee in the Primera Division de Mexico, including play-offs. In the Liga de Ascenso, Ricardo completed around 56 matches.

As international referee, Ricardo Arellano has participated in the 2012 Toulon Tournament officiating three matches, including the third place play-off between France and Netherlands. He received satisfactory comments regarding his participation and was pre-selected for the final match, in which he could not participate because the Mexico was involved in it. He has also participated in the 2011 Pan American Games, pre-World Cup 2011 FIFA U-17 World Cup, CONCACAF Champions League and North America SuperLiga.

Ricardo has participated several times in the marathon "Guadalupano" in Aguascalientes city, which is in honour of the Virgin of Guadalupe. In 2009, he was number 482 and his time was 1h 15' 35".
