= Omar Esparza =

Mexican footballer (born 1988)

Personal information
- Full name: Omar Alejandro Esparza Morales
- Date of birth: May 21, 1988 (age 38)
- Place of birth: Tototlán, Jalisco, Mexico
- Height: 1.81 m (5 ft 11 1/2 in)
- Position: Right-back

Team information
- Current team: Halcones (Assistant)

Youth career
- 2005–2006: Tapatío

Senior career*
Years	Team	Apps	(Gls)
2005–2015	Guadalajara	170	(3)
2013	→ San Luis (loan)	16	(0)
2015–2016	→ Pachuca (loan)	4	(0)
2017–2019	Tampico Madero	60	(1)
2020	Los Cabos	0	(0)

International career
2005	Mexico U17	9	(3)
2007	Mexico U20	7	(1)
2007–2008	Mexico	4	(0)

Managerial career
- 2021: CAFESSA Jalisco (Assistant)
- 2021: CAFESSA Jalisco
- 2024–: Halcones (Assistant)
Medal record
Representing Mexico
Men's football
FIFA U-17 World Cup
Winner	2005 Peru
- * Club domestic league appearances and goals

Omar Alejandro Esparza Morales (born 21 May 1988) is a Mexican former professional footballer who played as a right-back and manager. He is the brother of the professional football player, Rigoberto Esparza.

== Club career ==
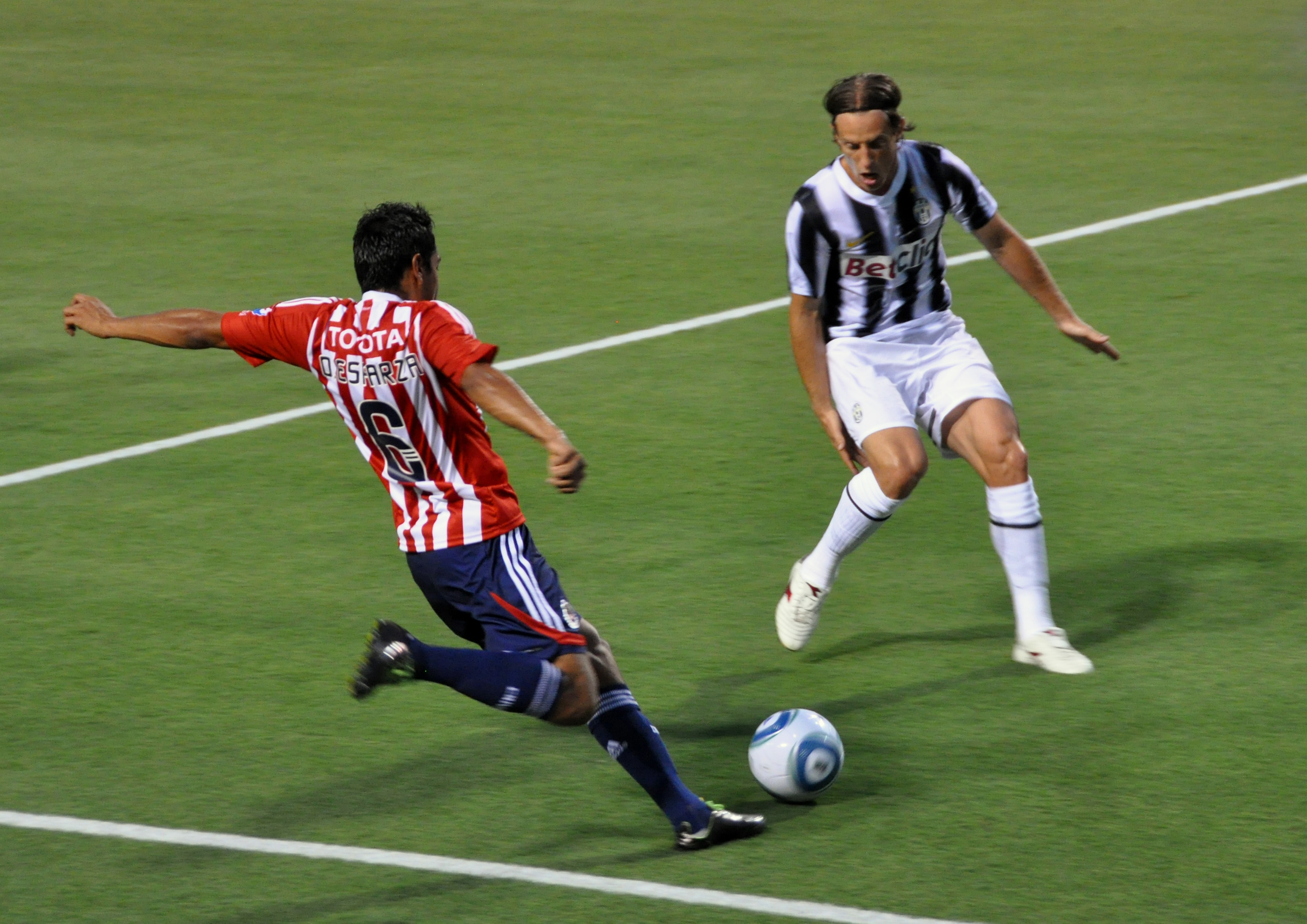
Esparza (left) playing against Juventus in 2011

Esparza made his debut on October 15, 2005, against CF Monterrey, playing only 12 minutes. He had switched playing time between Chivas and CD Tapatio since then, with a brief stay in Chivas Coras in the 2004–2006 season.

He took part in Chivas's Championship win in the Apertura 2006.

Esparza was given high praise by Mexico coach Javier Aguirre for his performances and was expected to cement a place in the 2010 World Cup starting line-up. However a knee injury picked up in the final game of the season ended his world cup hopes and he is not expected to be back in full training until June 2010.

== International career ==
Omar Esparza has played with the Mexico national football team in three categories.

He was present with the Mexico U-17 Team, in which he and his teammates won the U-17 World Cup in Peru in 2005. He played in the 2005 FIFA U-17 World Championship Match where Mexico obtained the cup against Brazil. The score was 3–0, and Esparza scored the 2nd goal of the final.

He has also played with U-20 in the FIFA U-20 World Cup that was held in Canada where he was an important player. Mexico played well but was eliminated by Argentina in the quarter-finals, losing 1-0 thanks to a goal scored by Maximiliano Moralez after bouncing the ball off a Mexican defender in the 45th minute .

On August 22, 2007, Esparza made his first appearance for the senior side.

== Career Statistics ==
As of 16 April 2008

International appearances
#	Date	Venue	Opponent	Result	Competition
1.	22 August 2007	Dick's Sporting Goods Park, Commerce City, United States	Colombia	0–1	Friendly
2.	9 September 2007	Estadio Cuauhtemoc, Puebla, Mexico	Panama	1–0	Friendly
3.	17 October 2007	Los Angeles Memorial Coliseum, Los Angeles, United States	Guatemala	2–3	Friendly
4.	16 April 2008	Qwest Field, Seattle, United States	China	1–0	Friendly

== Honours ==
Guadalajara

- Mexican Championship: Apertura 2006
- InterLiga: 2009

Pachuca

- Liga MX: Clausura 2016

Mexico U17

- FIFA U-17 World Championship: 2005
