= Marco Fabián =

Mexican footballer (born 1989)

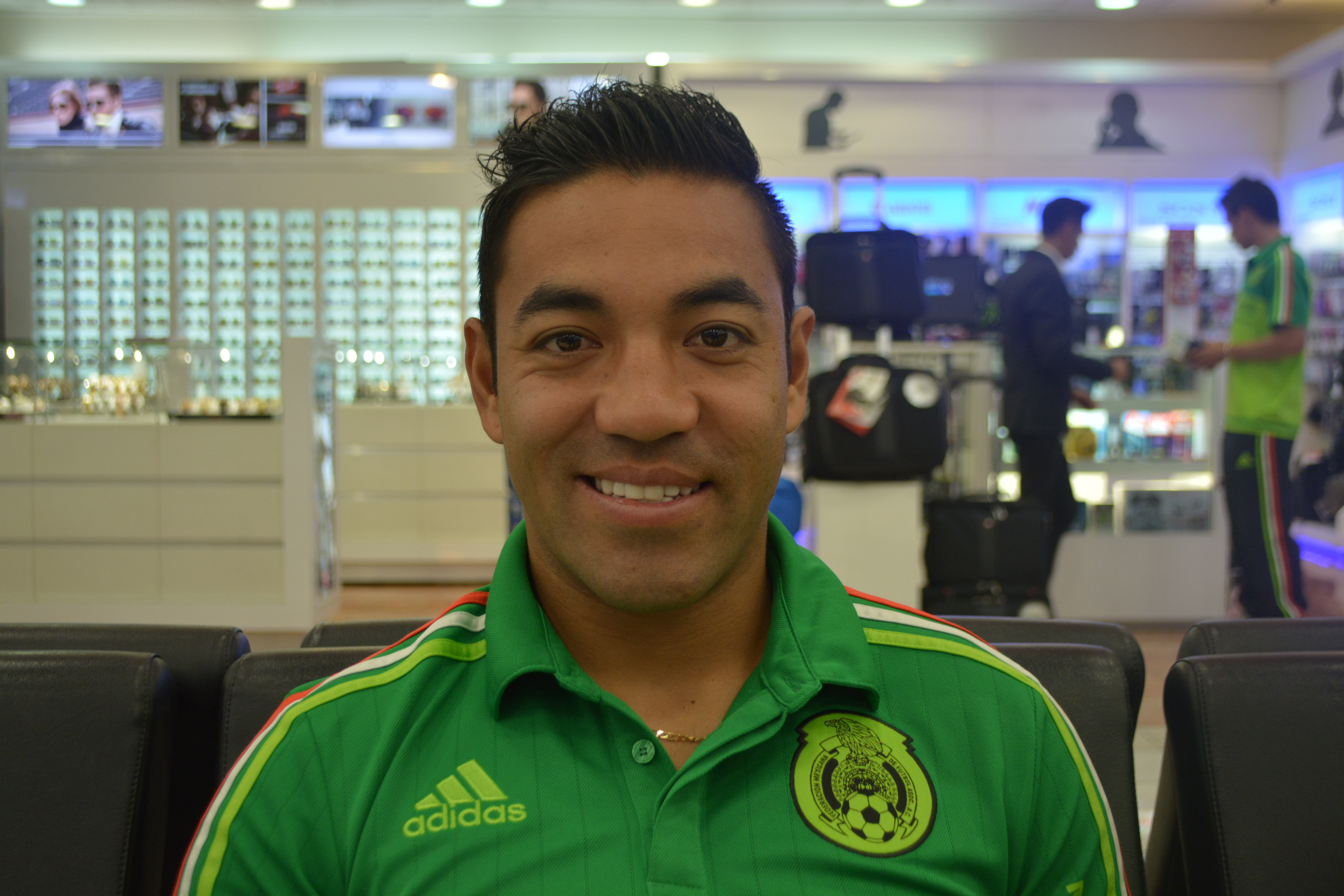
- Fabián with Mexico in 2016

Personal information
- Full name: Marco Jhonfai Fabián de la Mora
- Date of birth: 21 July 1989 (age 37)
- Place of birth: Guadalajara, Jalisco, Mexico
- Height: 1.70 m (5 ft 7 in)
- Position: Attacking midfielder

Youth career
- 1997–2007: Guadalajara

Senior career*
Years	Team	Apps	(Gls)
2006–2009	Tapatío	15	(2)
2007–2015	Guadalajara	193	(48)
2014	→ Cruz Azul (loan)	31	(8)
2016–2018	Eintracht Frankfurt	43	(8)
2019	Philadelphia Union	23	(7)
2020	Al-Sadd	3	(1)
2020–2021	Juárez	24	(0)
2022–2023	Mazatlán	30	(2)
2023	UE Santa Coloma	3	(0)
2023–2024	Empire Strykers (indoor)	43	(61)
2024	Rànger's	4	(2)
2026	Rànger's	0	(0)

International career
2011–2012	Mexico U23	20	(15)
2012–2019	Mexico	43	(9)
Medal record
Men's football
Representing Mexico
Olympic Games
Gold medal – first place	2012 London	Team
CONCACAF Gold Cup
Winner	2011 United States
Toulon Tournament
Winner	2012 France
Olympic Qualifying Championship
Winner	2012 United States
- * Club domestic league appearances and goals as of 15 December 2024

Marco Jhonfai Fabián de la Mora (Spanish pronunciation: [ˈmaɾko faˈβjan]; born 21 July 1989) is a Mexican former professional footballer who played as an attacking midfielder. He is an Olympic gold medalist.

Fabián began his career in the youth academy of his hometown club, Guadalajara, making his first-team debut in 2007. After a brief loan spell with Cruz Azul, he moved abroad to join Eintracht Frankfurt. He later played for Philadelphia Union, Al Sadd, Juárez, and Mazatlán before transitioning to amateur football.

Fabián represented Mexico at the youth level before earning his first senior cap. He became a key figure for Mexico's U-23 side, helping secure qualification for the 2012 Summer Olympics. He was part of the historic squad that captured Olympic gold in London, defeating Brazil in the final.

Between 2012 and 2019, Fabián made 43 appearances for Mexico, featuring in the 2015 Copa América, the 2017 FIFA Confederations Cup, and the 2014 and 2018 FIFA World Cup.

== Club career ==
=== Guadalajara ===
Fabián was recruited by Guadalajara, and spent ten years in the Chivas youth system, including appearances for their affiliate club Tapatío.

On 10 November 2007, Fabián made his first-team debut in a league match against Jaguares de Chiapas in the Apertura 2007 season under coach Efrain Flores, coming in as a substitute for Sergio Ávila in the 85th minute of the match. Fabián scored his first goal for Guadalajara in his second appearance, on 2 February 2008, in a 6–0 win over Morelia.

In the 2010 Copa Libertadores Finals, Fabián scored the first goal in a 3–2 defeat against Internacional.

On 15 October 2011, he scored the first hat-trick of his career against Estudiantes Tecos; Guadalajara went on to win the match 5–2.

==== Loan to Cruz Azul ====
On 12 December 2013, Fabián joined Cruz Azul on a two-year-long loan deal. Fabián made his Cruz Azul debut on 1 May 2014 against León, with the game ending in a 1–1 tie. On 15 February 2014, he scored a 92nd minute winning goal against Puebla. The goal was later nominated for the 2014 FIFA Puskás Award.

=== Return to Guadalajara ===
On 26 December 2014, after his loan deal expired, Cruz Azul opted not to exercise their purchase option due to Fabián's high expense. He subsequently returned to Guadalajara and was assigned the number 33 shirt, since his preferred number 10 had since been taken; 33 was the same kit number he used when he made his professional debut in 2007. In his return to the Omnilife Stadium, on 18 January, Fabián scored his first goal of the Clausura 2015 tournament against UNAM in a 2–1 home victory. On 21 February 2015, he scored in a 2–1 away victory against Cruz Azul at the Azul Stadium. On 17 May 2015, he scored a hat-trick against Atlas during the 2015 Clausura quarter-finals, where Guadalajara won the match 4–1.

=== Eintracht Frankfurt ===
On 18 December 2015, Guadalajara announced Fabián was sold to Bundesliga side Eintracht Frankfurt for a transfer fee of US$4 million on a three-year contract. After completing his medical, Fabián was handed the number 10 jersey. He made his official debut coming on as a substitute for Haris Seferović in the 45th minute in a home match against VfL Wolfsburg on 24 January 2016. He created the play that led to Alexander Meier's hat-trick that won the game 3–2.

He scored his first goal of the 2016–17 season—and his first Bundesliga goal—in a 2–1 win over Bayer Leverkusen on 17 September 2016. On 15 October, Fabián connected with his chest off a Timothy Chandler cross as Eintracht held Bayern Munich to a 2–2 draw.

=== Philadelphia Union ===
On 8 February 2019, it was officially announced that Fabián had been transferred from Frankfurt to MLS team Philadelphia Union. He signed a one-year deal with club options for the next two years. On 2 March, Fabian made his MLS debut against Toronto FC, scoring his team's lone goal of the encounter, losing 3–1. On 20 October, in a playoff match against New York Red Bulls, he entered the match at the 103rd minute and scored the winning goal of the match, leaving the result 4–3 and giving Philadelphia their first playoff win in team history.

On 20 November 2019, Philadelphia announced they had declined the option on Fabián's contract.

=== Later career ===
On 5 February 2020, he joined the Qatari club Al–Sadd until the end of the season. On 11 August, Fabián returned to Mexico and signed a one-year contract with Juárez. After spending six months without a club, he joined Mazatlán on 18 January 2022.

On 29 September 2023, Fabián completed his return to Europe, joining Andorran side Santa Coloma on a free transfer, signing a 6-month contract.

In December 2023, Fabián joined the Major Arena Soccer League (MASL) by signing with the Empire Strykers in Southern California on a two-year contract. The deal, the second-largest in league history, included an option for Fabián to own and operate an MASL team in the future. Fabián's signing was expected to lure other out-of-contract professional players to MASL, beginning with former Mexico teammate Miguel Ángel Ponce. In July 2025, Fabián extended his Empire Strykers contract until 2027.

== International career ==
=== Youth ===
Fabián was selected by coach Juan Carlos Chávez to participate in the 2009 CONCACAF U-20 Championship held in Trinidad and Tobago. He made his youth International debut 7 March 2009 against Costa Rica wearing the number 8 shirt. Fabián managed three appearances for Mexico during the tournament; Mexico placed last in their group, thus failing to qualify to the 2009 FIFA U-20 World Cup.

==== 2012 Olympic qualifying tournament ====
In early 2012, Fabián was called up by coach Luis Fernando Tena to participate in the 2012 Olympic Qualifying Tournament. He made his debut 23 March 2012 against Trinidad and Tobago, scoring a hat-trick in a 7–1 win for Mexico. Fabián also went on to score in the semi-final match against Canada, winning the match 3–1. He then score from a long-range shot in the final match against Honduras, winning the match 2–1 and also the tournament, thus qualifying Mexico for the 2012 Summer Olympics. He finished the tournament as top goal scorer alongside his teammate Alan Pulido with five goals in five appearances.

==== 2012 Toulon Tournament ====
Again Fabián was selected by coach Tena to dispute the 2012 Toulon Tournament in preparation for the Summer Olympics. Fabián debuted in the tournament with a hat-trick against Morocco. He went on to score a goal in a defeat against the host nation France, and scored a Brace against Belarus. Fabián also scored in the semi-final match against Netherlands, but could not score in the final against Turkey, which Mexico won 3–0. Fabián won the tournament's Top Scorer award after netting seven goals in five appearances during the tournament. He tied England's Alan Shearer as the all-time Toulon Tournament top scorer, with seven goals.

==== 2012 Summer Olympics ====
Fabián made the final list for those players participating in the 2012 London Olympics. He made his debut in Mexico's first match of the tournament 2012 as a starter against South Korea, a game that ended 0–0. Fabián showed great skill and workmanship throughout the group stage match and helped Mexico reach the knockoff round. During the semi-final match against Japan, he proved vital by scoring in the 31st minute of the match to tie the game and later to win it 3–1, securing Mexico's progression to the final against Brazil. During the final, he almost netted an over-head bicycle kick goal but it struck the post, though he did provide an assist for Oribe Peralta's second goal of the match. Mexico would win the match 2–1 and thus win the Olympic goal medal. He played the entire tournament as Mexico's second striker behind Peralta, and created a successful offensive deplete with him throughout the tournament. He finished the tournament with one goal from six matches, all as a starter. As a result, he became the top goal scorer for Mexico at the under-23 level, with 15 goals.

=== Senior ===
Fabián made his senior national team debut against Venezuela in a 3–1 win on 25 January 2012.

==== 2011 Gold Cup ====
During the Gold Cup 2011, Fabián was named as one of the replacements for the five players who tested positive for clenbuterol, but would only be called to join them in an emergency, because he was already in concentration with the under-22 squad in preparation for the Copa América.

==== 2011 Copa America ====
In 2011, Marco was called up by Luis Fernando Tena to form part of the "unofficial national team" composed entirely of players under the age of 22 to compete in the 2011 Copa América. He started most of the preparation games and scored a few goals before being suspended for six months, along with seven more players, for breaking disciplinary codes at their concentration hotel in Quito.

==== 2013 Gold Cup ====
Fabián played his first major tournament with the senior national team at the 2013 Gold Cup. He made his debut against Panama. He finished the tournament with three goals and three assists.

==== 2014 FIFA World Cup ====
On 8 May 2014, Fabián was included in the final 23-man roster participating in the 2014 FIFA World Cup in Brazil. He debuted in a World Cup by coming on as a substitute in the first match against Cameroon in the 69th minute for Andrés Guardado. In Mexico's second match, against Brazil, he came on in the 76th minute for Héctor Herrera. He also played in the third match against Croatia coming on as a substitute in the 84th minute, once again for Andrés Guardado.

==== 2017 Confederations Cup ====
In his first Confederations Cup call up, Fabián only played twice. He was a starter in the second match in the group stage against New Zealand. In the semi-final game against Germany, he was subbed in for Giovani dos Santos on the 62nd minute. He went on to score Mexico's only goal against Germany on the 89th minute, making the score 3–1. Mexico would go on to lose the match 4–1. His goal against Germany was voted as Hyundai Goal of the Tournament.

==== 2018 World Cup ====
In May 2018, Fabián was named in Mexico's preliminary 28-man squad for the World Cup, and in June, was ultimately included in the final 23-man roster. He would only appear in Mexico's final group stage match against Sweden, substituted in at the 67th minute for Jesús Gallardo in a 3–0 loss.

== Style of play ==
ESPN described him as, "His balance and poise on the ball is impeccable [...]. Equally adept on either foot, he can play on either wing or as an attacking midfielder and breezes past defenders as if they are not there. Fabián also has that knack of scoring spectacular goals that help win fans over."

According to a poll held by German sports magazine Kicker, he was voted the third best offensive midfielder in the Bundesliga, placing him in the "international class" of the magazine's Rangliste des deutschen Fussballs (Ranking of German football) for the Winter of 2016–17.

== Personal life ==
Fabián helped fund a football academy Guadalajara, Mexico. It provides football coaching, nutritional and psychological advice to participants under the direct supervision of Fabián himself. One graduate of the program reportedly signed with Brazilian club Santos FC in 2016. Fabián is also a fan of the baseball team Charros de Jalisco, and is a close friend to Javier Hernández.

He appeared on the Mexican front cover of FIFA 16 along with Lionel Messi.

== Career statistics ==
=== Club ===
As of match played 2 October 2023

Appearances and goals by club, season and competition
Club	Season	League			National cup		League cup		Continental		Other		Total	
Club	Season	Division	Apps	Goals	Apps	Goals	Apps	Goals	Apps	Goals	Apps	Goals	Apps	Goals
Guadalajara	2008–09	Liga MX	26	1	—		—		12 (Note: 8 appearances & 2 goals in Copa Sudamericana and 4 appearances & 1 goal in Copa Libertadores)	3	3 (Note: Appearances in Interliga)	1	41	5
Guadalajara	2009–10	Liga MX	22	1	—		—		2 (Note: Appearances in Copa Libertadores)	0	—		24	1
Guadalajara	2010–11	Liga MX	36	15	—		—		4	1	—		40	16
Guadalajara	2011–12	Liga MX	29	9	—		—		2	0	—		31	9
Guadalajara	2012–13	Liga MX	22	8	0	0	—		3 (Note: Appearances is CONCACAF Champions League)	3	—		25	11
Guadalajara	2013–14	Liga MX	15	3	2	1	—		0	0	—		17	4
Guadalajara	2014–15	Liga MX	18	7	1	0	—		0	0	—		19	7
Guadalajara	2015–16	Liga MX	13	9	7	1	—		0	0	—		20	10
Guadalajara	Total		181	53	10	2	0	0	23	7	3	1	217	63
Cruz Azul (loan)	2013–14	Liga MX	15	7	0	0	—		5	0	—		20	7
Cruz Azul (loan)	2014–15	Liga MX	16	1	0	0	—		4	1	3 (Note: Appearances in FIFA Club World Cup)	0	23	2
Cruz Azul (loan)	Total		31	8	0	0	0	0	9	1	3	0	43	9
Eintracht Frankfurt	2015–16	Bundesliga	11	0	0	0	—		0	0	1 (Note: Appearance in Relegation playoffs)	0	12	0
Eintracht Frankfurt	2016–17	Bundesliga	24	7	3	0	—		0	0	—		27	7
Eintracht Frankfurt	2017–18	Bundesliga	7	1	2	0	—		0	0	—		9	1
Eintracht Frankfurt	2018–19	Bundesliga	1	0	0	0	—		0	0	1 (Note: Appearance in German Supercup)	0	2	0
Eintracht Frankfurt	Total		43	8	5	0	0	0	0	0	2	0	50	8
Philadelphia Union	2019	MLS	25	8	0	0	—		0	0	—		25	8
Al Sadd	2019–20	Qatar Stars League	3	1	0	0	1	0	0	0	—		4	1
Al Sadd	2020–21	Qatar Stars League	0	0	—		—		—		—		0	0
Juárez	2020–21	Liga MX	24	0	0	0	—		0	0	—		24	0
Mazatlán	2021–22	Liga MX	13	1	0	0	—		0	0	—		13	1
Mazatlán	2022–23	Liga MX	17	1	0	0	—		0	0	—		17	1
Mazatlán	Total		30	2	0	0	0	0	0	0	0	0	30	2
Santa Coloma	2023–24	Andorran Primera Divisió	0	0	0	0	—		—		—		0	0
Career total			337	80	15	2	1	0	32	8	8	1	393	91

=== International ===
As of 10 September 2019

Appearances and goals by national team and year
National team	Year	Apps	Goals
Mexico	2012	3	0
Mexico	2013	8	4
Mexico	2014	12	2
Mexico	2015	4	0
Mexico	2016	4	1
Mexico	2017	4	1
Mexico	2018	7	1
Mexico	2019	1	0
Total		43	9

Scores and results list Mexico's goal tally first, score column indicates score after each Fabián goal.

List of international goals scored by Marco Fabián
No.	Date	Venue	Opponent	Score	Result	Competition
1	30 January 2013	University of Phoenix Stadium, Glendale, United States	Denmark	1–0	1–1	Friendly
2	7 July 2013	Rose Bowl, Pasadena, United States	Panama	1–1	1–2	2013 CONCACAF Gold Cup
3	11 July 2013	CenturyLink Field, Seattle, United States	Canada	2–0	2–0	2013 CONCACAF Gold Cup
4	14 July 2013	Sports Authority Field at Mile High, Denver, United States	Martinique	1–0	3–1	2013 CONCACAF Gold Cup
5	28 May 2014	Estadio Azteca, Mexico City, Mexico	Israel	3–0	3–0	Friendly
6	31 May 2014	AT&T Stadium, Arlington, United States	Ecuador	2–0	3–1	Friendly
7	8 October 2016	Nissan Stadium, Nashville, United States	New Zealand	2–1	2–1	Friendly
8	29 June 2017	Fisht Olympic Stadium, Sochi, Russia	Germany	1–3	1–4	2017 FIFA Confederations Cup
9	23 March 2018	Levi's Stadium, Santa Clara, United States	Iceland	1–0	3–0	Friendly

== Honours ==
Guadalajara

- Copa MX: Apertura 2015
- InterLiga: 2009

Cruz Azul

- CONCACAF Champions League: 2013–14

Eintracht Frankfurt

- DFB-Pokal: 2017–18

Al Sadd

- Qatari Stars Cup: 2019–20
- Amir of Qatar Cup: 2020

Santa Coloma

- Primera Divisió: 2023–24

Mexico U23

- CONCACAF Olympic Qualifying Championship: 2012
- Toulon Tournament: 2012
- Olympic Gold Medal: 2012

Mexico

- CONCACAF Gold Cup: 2011

Individual

- CONCACAF Olympic Qualifying Championship Top Scorer: 2012 (Shared)
- Toulon Tournament Golden Boot: 2012
- FIFA Confederations Cup Goal of the Tournament: 2017
- MASL Offensive Player of the Month: January 2024
- MASL's Elite 6: 2023–24
- MASL Newcomer of the Year: 2023–24
- MASL Golden Boot: 2023–24
- MASL All-Star: 2025
