= Kristian Álvarez =

Mexican footballer (born 1992)

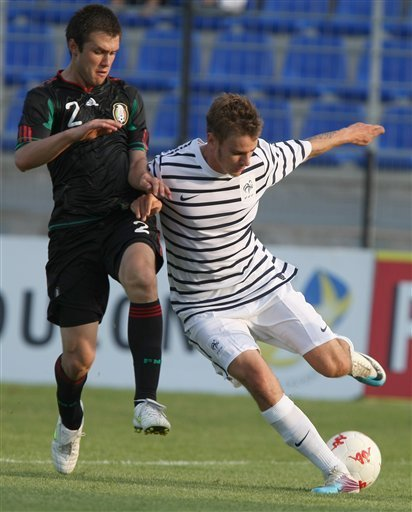

Personal information
- Full name: Kristian Omar Álvarez
- Date of birth: 20 April 1992 (age 34)
- Place of birth: Zapotlanejo, Jalisco, Mexico
- Height: 1.82 m (6 ft 0 in)
- Position: Centre-back

Team information
- Current team: Oaxaca
- Number: 4

Senior career*
Years	Team	Apps	(Gls)
2010–2017	Guadalajara	59	(0)
2015–2016	→ Santos Laguna (loan)	16	(0)
2017	→ Veracruz (loan)	23	(1)
2018–2019	UdeG	42	(3)
2019	UdeC	0	(0)
2019–2022	Salamanca	31	(1)
2023–2024	Atlético La Paz	53	(6)
2025–	Oaxaca	30	(0)

International career
2009	Mexico U17	7	(0)
2011	Mexico U20	12	(1)
Medal record
Representing Mexico
- * Club domestic league appearances and goals as of 22 September 2026 |- | style="text-align:center;vertical-align:middle;color:inherit;background-color:gold;color:inherit;" | Winner|| style="text-align:center;vertical-align:middle;" | CONCACAF U-20 Championship|| style="text-align:center;vertical-align:middle;" | 2011 |- | style="text-align:center;vertical-align:middle;color:inherit;" | || style="text-align:center;vertical-align:middle;" | FIFA U-20 World Cup|| style="text-align:center;vertical-align:middle;" | 2011

Kristian Omar Álvarez Nuño (born 20 April 1992) is a Mexican professional footballer who plays as centre-back for Liga de Expansión MX club Oaxaca.

== Club career ==
Kristian Álvarez was born in Zapotlanejo, Jalisco. He was one of the young promises of the Guadalajara. He was already captain of the Chivas sub-17 team. On 23 April 2011 he made his professional debut against Cruz Azul in a 1–1 draw. José Luis Real has described Álvarez as very talented, strong, great at marking and sweeping, having bravery and aggression to rush out and deal with any unexpected goal threats.

On June 10, 2015, it was officially announced Álvarez would join Santos Laguna on loan.

Álvarez joined Veracruz on a one-year loan.

== International career ==
In the 2009 FIFA U-17 World Cup he was the captain on the Mexico U-17 team. Right-back Kristian Alvarez opened for Mexico with an amazing long-range lob. Diego De Buen scores a brilliant volley to also score in the 3–0 win over Canada. Kristian Alvarez scored twice to help Mexico beat Guatemala 3-0 and reach the 2009 U-17 World Cup.

== Career statistics ==
As of match played on 14 March 2021

Appearances and goals by club, season and competition
Club	Season	League			National Cup		Continental		Total	
Club	Season	Division	Apps	Goals	Apps	Goals	Apps	Goals	Apps	Goals
Guadalajara	2010–11	Mexican Primera División season	4	0	0	0	—		4	0
Guadalajara	2011–12	Mexican Primera División season	19	0	0	0	5 (Note: Appearance(s) in Copa Libertadores)	0	24	0
Guadalajara	2012–13	Liga MX	24	0	0	0	—		24	0
Guadalajara	2013–14	Liga MX	9	0	10	0	—		19	0
Guadalajara	2014–15	Liga MX	3	0	16	1	—		19	1
Guadalajara	Total		59	0	26	1	5	0	90	1
Santos Laguna (loan)	2015–16	Liga MX	8	0	0	0	2 (Note: Appearance(s) in CONCACAF Champions League)	0	10	0
Santos Laguna (loan)	2016–17	Liga MX	8	0	4	0	—		12	0
Santos Laguna (loan)	Total		16	0	4	0	2	0	22	0
Veracruz	2016–17	Liga MX	11	1	0	0	—		11	1
Veracruz	2017–18	Liga MX	12	0	1	0	—		13	0
Veracruz	Total		23	1	1	0	0	0	24	1
UdeG	2017–18	Ascenso MX	19	2	0	0	—		19	2
UdeG	2018–19	Ascenso MX	23	1	1	0	—		24	1
UdeG	Total		42	3	1	0	0	0	43	3
Salamanca	2019–20	Segunda División B	16	1	0	0	—		16	1
Salamanca	2020–21	Segunda División B	8	0	0	0	—		8	0
Salamanca	Total		24	1	0	0	0	0	24	1
Career total			164	5	32	3	7	0	203	6

== Honours ==
=== Club ===
ACC L3

- Campeón de Campeones: 2015

=== International ===
Mexico U20

- CONCACAF U-20 Championship: 2011
