= Abraham Coronado =

Mexican footballer (born 1992)

Personal information
- Full name: Abraham Coronado Tafoya
- Date of birth: 28 January 1992 (age 34)
- Place of birth: Ocotlán, Jalisco, Mexico
- Height: 1.75 m (5 ft 9 in)
- Position: Winger

Senior career*
| Years | Team | Apps | (Gls) |
| 2010–2014 | Guadalajara | 26 | (1) |
| 2011–2012 | → Irapuato (loan) | 11 | (0) |
| 2014 | → Coras (loan) | 12 | (1) |
| 2015 | → Toluca (loan) | 1 | (0) |
| 2015 | → Necaxa (loan) | 4 | (0) |
| 2016 | → Coras (loan) | 18 | (3) |
| 2016–2018 | Loros | 46 | (1) |
| 2018–2019 | Salamanca B | 0 | (0) |
| 2019 | Venados | 6 | (0) |
| 2020 | Los Cabos | 0 | (0) |
| 2021 | Durango | 0 | (0) |

International career
| 2008–2009 | Mexico U-17 | 7 | (0) |
- * Club domestic league appearances and goals

Abraham Coronado Tafoya (born 28 January 1992) is a former Mexican professional footballer who last played as a winger for Durango.

== Club career ==
Coronado began his career with Club Deportivo Guadalajara. Coronado scored his first professional goal against Querétaro in a 3–1 loss for Chivas.
