= Luis Michel =

Mexican footballer (born 1979)

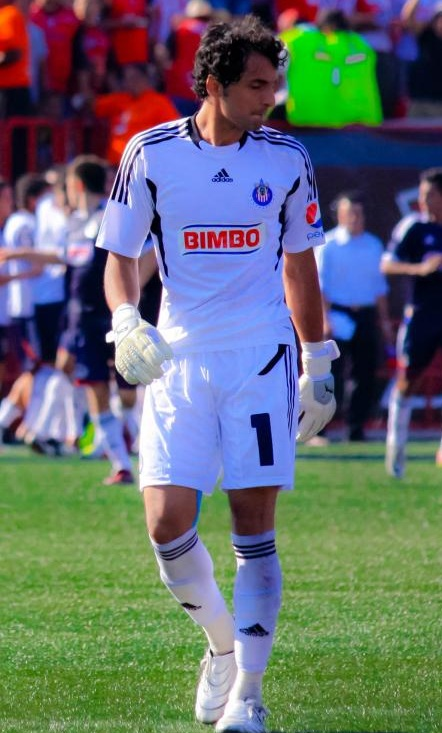
- Michel with Guadalajara in 2011

Personal information
- Full name: Luis Ernesto Michel Vergara
- Date of birth: 21 July 1979 (age 47)
- Place of birth: El Grullo, Jalisco, Mexico
- Height: 1.83 m (6 ft 0 in)
- Position: Goalkeeper

Team information
- Current team: Tijuana U-21 (Manager)

Senior career*
Years	Team	Apps	(Gls)
2003	Tapatío	4	(0)
2003	Guadalajara	1	(0)
2004	→ Cajeteros de Celaya (loan)	18	(0)
2004–2005	→ Santos Laguna (loan)	2	(0)
2005–2006	Chivas Coras Tepic	21	(0)
2006	Tapatío	7	(0)
2006–2016	Guadalajara	251	(0)
2014	→ Saprissa (loan)	18	(0)
2015–2016	→ Sinaloa (loan)	33	(0)
2016	→ BUAP (loan)	4	(0)
2017–2020	Tijuana	0	(0)
2017	→ Sinaloa (loan)	13	(0)
Total		372	(0)

International career
2010–2011	Mexico	7	(0)

Managerial career
- 2021–: Tijuana Reserves and Academy
Medal record
Representing Mexico
CONCACAF Gold Cup
Winner	CONCACAF Gold Cup	2011
- * Club domestic league appearances and goals

Luis Ernesto Michel Vergara (born 21 July 1979) is a Mexican football manager and a former professional footballer who played as a goalkeeper. Michel has captained both Guadalajara and the Mexico national team in official matches, captaining the latter in the 2011 Copa América.

== Club career ==
On January 6, 2014, Guadalajara loaned Michel to Costa Rican club Deportivo Saprissa for six months, with Saprissa having the option of extending the deal for an extra six months.

== International career ==
Michel was called up to the 2010 FIFA World Cup, but he did not play in the tournament.

== Career statistics ==
=== International ===
As of match played 13 July 2011

National team	Year	Apps	Goals
Mexico	2010	4	0
Mexico	2011	3	0
Total		7	0

== Honours ==
Guadalajara

- Mexican Primera División: Apertura 2006

Saprissa

- Costa Rican Primera División: Clausura 2014

Mexico

- CONCACAF Gold Cup: 2011

Individual

- Mexican Primera División Golden Glove: Clausura 2008

Preceded by Ramon Morales	C.D. Guadalajara Captain; 2009–2010	Succeeded by Hector Reynoso
