= Jesús Sánchez (footballer, born 1989) =

Mexican footballer (born 1989)

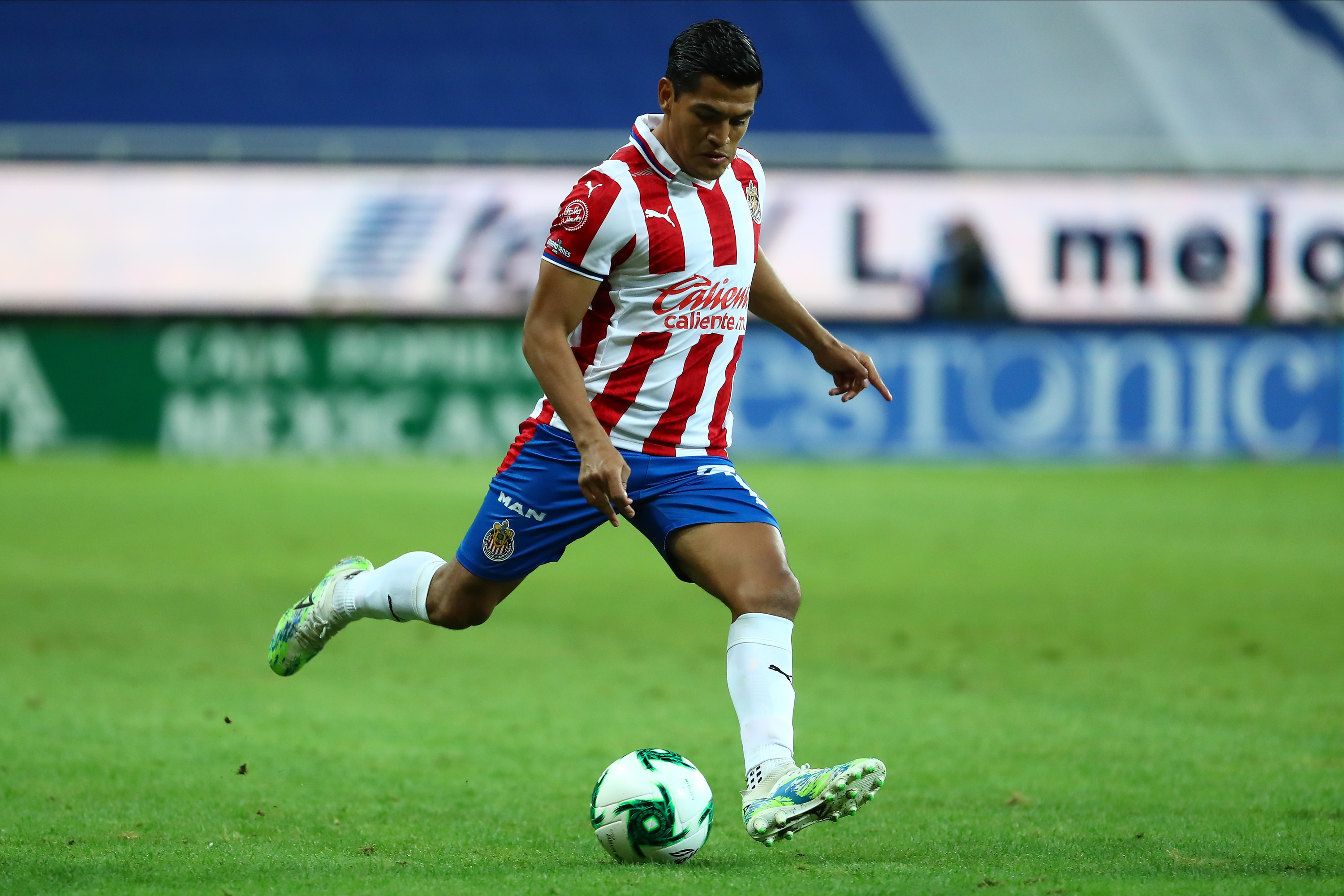
- Sánchez playing with Guadalajara in 2020

Personal information
- Full name: Jesús Enrique Sánchez García
- Date of birth: 31 August 1989 (age 37)
- Place of birth: San Luis Río Colorado, Sonora, Mexico
- Height: 1.68 m (5 ft 6 in)
- Position: Right-back

Senior career*
Years	Team	Apps	(Gls)
2010–2024	Guadalajara	286	(4)

International career
2011	Mexico U23	1	(0)
- * Club domestic league appearances and goals as of 3 December 2023

Jesús Enrique Sánchez García (born 31 August 1989), also known as Chapito, is a Mexican former professional footballer who played as a right-back. Sánchez played his entire career for Guadalajara.

== Club career ==
=== Guadalajara ===
Sánchez joined Guadalajara's youth academy in 2008. He was one of the co-captains of the Chivas under-20 team and helped his team win many youth championships. Sánchez debuted on August 7, 2010, in a 1–0 win against San Luis at the Estadio Alfonso Lastras Ramírez stadium. He scored his first goal on October 9, 2010, against Querétaro at the Estadio La Corregidora. He scored his 2nd goal for Guadalajara in the Liga MX against Atlante in the last minutes securing the 2–0 score for Guadalajara. His 3rd Liga MX goal didn't come until January 2017 against Querétaro scoring the only goal in the match giving Guadalajara the victory 0–1. He was a part of the starting lineup that won the Clausura 2017 Final.

On 7 November 2024, Sánchez announced his retirement from professional football.

== International career ==
=== U-23 International appearances ===
As of 2 September 2011

International appearances
#	Date	Venue	Opponent	Result	Competition
1.	September 2, 2011	Estadio Alfonso Lastras, San Luis Potosí, Mexico	Chile	1–3	Friendly

== Honours ==
Guadalajara

- Liga MX: Clausura 2017
- Copa MX: Apertura 2015, Clausura 2017
- Supercopa MX: 2016
- CONCACAF Champions League: 2018

Individual

- Liga MX Best XI: Clausura 2017

== See also ==
- List of one-club men in association football
