= Héctor Reynoso =

Mexican footballer (born 1980)

Personal information
- Full name: Héctor Reynoso López
- Date of birth: October 3, 1980 (age 46)
- Place of birth: Mexico City, Mexico
- Height: 1.82 m (5 ft 11 1/2 in)
- Position: Centre-back

Youth career
- 1995-1998: Guadalajara
- 1999–2000: Grasshopper Club Zürich

Senior career*
| Years | Team | Apps | (Gls) |
| 1999 | Nacional Tijuana | 0 | (0) |
| 2001–2015 | Guadalajara | 369 | (26) |
| 2004 | Tapatío | 1 | (0) |
| 2014 | → Morelia (loan) | 10 | (0) |
| 2014 | → UdeG (loan) | 13 | (1) |
| 2015–2016 | UdeG | 16 | (1) |
| Total | | 408 | (28) |

International career
| 2011 | Mexico | 4 | (0) |

Managerial career
- 2017: Guadalajara U-15
Medal record
Representing Mexico
CONCACAF Gold Cup
| Winner | CONCACAF Gold Cup | 2011 |
- * Club domestic league appearances and goals

Héctor Reynoso López (born 3 October 1980) is a Mexican former professional footballer who played as a centre-back.

Reynoso spent the majority of his playing career with Guadalajara, where he made 460 appearances across all competitions, making him the second most capped player in the club's history.

== Career ==
=== Guadalajara ===
Reynoso has played his whole professional career with Guadalajara, but went through a short loan spell at Swiss club Grasshopper Club Zurich in 1999. He is known for his great defensive skills.

Reynoso made his professional debut on April 17, 2001, against Tigres. During the Clausura 2006 tournament, Reynoso played and started in all 17 games. He completed 12 of them and entered as a sub in 3 games. He received 5 yellow cards and scored 0 goals. He scored a vital goal in the second game of the Copa Libertadores two-game series against Independiente Santa Fe of Colombia, where he scored in the 6th minute. Thanks to Reynoso's goal, Chivas advanced to the quarterfinals of the South American tournament by an aggregate score of 4–3. (Chivas won the first game 3–0, but lost the second 3–1). Reynoso has become a vital part of the Chivas defense with his great playing and defensive skills. Reynoso was the team Captain for the Peace Cup, because the regular team Captain Ramón Morales and Vice-Captain Omar Bravo were in Venezuela playing with the Selección de fútbol de México (Mexico national team) at Copa America. He captained the game in which Chivas beat Racing de Santander 5–0.

Reynoso is known by many Mexican soccer commentators as "Samson", because of his long and curly hairstyle.

In a 2009 Libertadores Santander cup game against Everton from Chile, Reynoso spat and sneezed in the face of opponent Sebastián Penco and told him he had swine flu. Reynoso later apologized for the incident, but his actions were recorded and made headline news all over the world. In 2011, in a game between Guadalajara and Manchester United F.C., he scored a header, to put the score 3–1.

=== Morelia ===
After 13 years of career at Chivas, on December 17, 2013, Reynoso joined Liga MX club Monarcas Morelia on a six-month loan deal.

=== U.De.G ===
After his loan deal expired he was once again sent out on loan, this time to Club Universidad de Guadalajara. On 16 December 2014, the club announced they had signed him permanently for the 2015 season.

== International career ==
On June 19, 2011, Reynoso was called up to participate in the 2011 Gold Cup as one of the replacement for five suspended players, he was also called up to the 2011 Copa América as an overage player replacing injured Jonny Magallón, thus receiving his first call-up to the national team. He earned his first cap in the victorious Gold Cup Final against the United States on June 25, coming on as a substitute for the injured Rafael Márquez.

== Honours ==
Guadalajara

- Mexican Primera División: Apertura 2006

Mexico

- CONCACAF Gold Cup: 2011

| Preceded by Luis Ernesto Michel | Club Deportivo Guadalajara captain 2010 - 2013 | Succeeded by Omar Bravo |
