= Jonny Magallón =

Mexican footballer (born 1981)

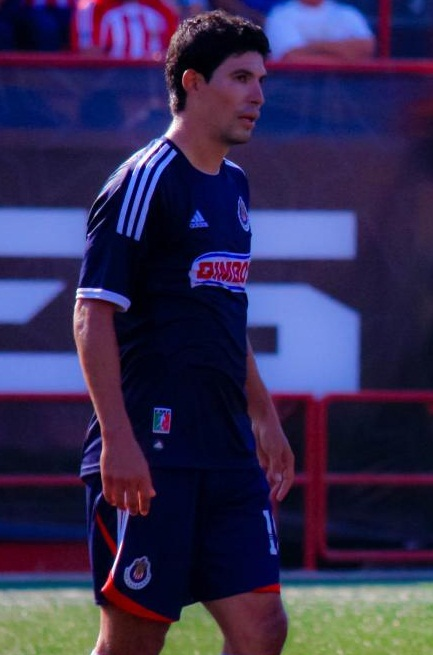
- Magallón with Guadalajara in 2011

Personal information
- Full name: José Jonny Magallón Oliva
- Date of birth: 21 November 1981 (age 44)
- Place of birth: Ocotlán, Jalisco, Mexico
- Height: 1.78 m (5 ft 10 in)
- Position: Centre-back

Youth career
- 1991–2002: Tapatío

Senior career*
Years	Team	Apps	(Gls)
2003–2012	Guadalajara	216	(3)
2012–2016	León	126	(0)
2016	Lanús	2	(0)
2017–2018	Zacatecas	46	(2)
2020	Atlético Jalisco	0	(0)
Total		368	(6)

International career
2007–2011	Mexico	54	(3)
Medal record
Mexico
Winner	CONCACAF Gold Cup	2009
Runner-up	CONCACAF Gold Cup	2007
Third place	Copa America	2007
- * Club domestic league appearances and goals

José Jonny Magallón Oliva (born 21 November 1981) is a Mexican former professional footballer who played as a centre-back.

A defender capable of playing as a centre back and full-back, he started his senior career with Guadalajara in 2003. He was eventually sold to Club León in the summer of 2012, helping the team win both tournaments of the 2013–14 season. He had a brief stint with Argentinean club CA Lanús before returning to Mexico's second division team, Mineros de Zacatecas.

A regular Mexico international under Hugo Sánchez, he was called up to participate in the 2007 and 2009 CONCACAF Gold Cups, the 2007 Copa América, and the 2010 FIFA World Cup.

== Club career ==
=== CD Gualadajara ===
Magallón made his professional debut with Guadalajara on 16 March 2003, against arch rival Club América which ended in the victory of Guadalajara 2–1. After playing 12 seasons with Chivas, the defender was sold to Club León in June 2012.

=== Club León ===
He would go on to win back-to-back tournaments of the 2013–14 Liga MX season, the Apertura 2013 and the Clausura 2014.

=== Club Atlético Lanús ===
In the summer of 2016, Magallón was transferred to CA Lanús, where he played for 6 months.

=== Mineros de Zacatecas ===
After a brief stint with CA Lanús, Magallon returned to Mexico to play with Mineros de Zacatecas in Mexico's second tier, Ascenso MX.

== International career ==
On 18 January 2007, then national team coach Hugo Sánchez gave Magallón his first call up to the national team, and he played his first game with Mexico on 28 February 2007 against Venezuela, winning 3–1. He was the player with the most minutes at the 2007 CONCACAF Gold Cup and 2007 Copa America. On 7 February he was the protagonist of the friendly match against the United States, he scored both of Mexico's goals in a 2–2 draw, coming back from behind on both occasions. Magallón was called up to the 2010 FIFA World Cup but he did not play in the tournament. Magallon was last called up by Mexico coach José Manuel de la Torre in a friendly match against Serbia on 11 November 2011.

== Career statistics ==
=== International ===
As of match played 11 November 2011

National team	Year	Apps	Goals
Mexico	2007	22	0
Mexico	2008	10	3
Mexico	2009	13	0
Mexico	2010	8	0
Mexico	2011	1	0
Total		54	3

=== International goals ===
Scores and results list Mexico's goal tally first.

Goal	Date	Venue	Opponent	Score	Result	Competition
1.	February 6, 2008	Reliant Stadium, Houston, United States	United States	1–1	2–2	Friendly
2.	February 6, 2008	Reliant Stadium, Houston, United States	United States	2–2	2–2	Friendly
3.	September 6, 2008	Estadio Azteca, Mexico City, Mexico	Jamaica	3–0	3–0	2010 FIFA World qualification

== Honours ==
Guadalajara

- Mexican Primera División: Apertura 2006

León

- Liga MX: Apertura 2013, Clausura 2014

Mexico

- CONCACAF Gold Cup: 2009

Individual

- Copa América Team of the Tournament: 2007
