= Patricio Araujo =

Mexican footballer (born 1988)

Personal information
- Full name: Patricio Gabriel Araujo Vázquez
- Date of birth: 30 January 1988 (age 38)
- Place of birth: Colima, Mexico
- Height: 1.75 m (5 ft 9 in)
- Position: Centre-back

Senior career*
Years	Team	Apps	(Gls)
2005–2015	Guadalajara	267	(5)
2015–2016	→ Puebla (loan)	32	(1)
2016–2018	Puebla	37	(1)
2019	Celaya	5	(0)
2020	Acaxees de Durango	0	(0)

International career
2005	Mexico U17	9	(0)
2007	Mexico U20	7	(0)
2008	Mexico U23	6	(0)
2007	Mexico	6	(0)
Medal record
Representing Mexico
Men's football
FIFA U-17 World Cup
Winner	2005 Peru
- * Club domestic league appearances and goals

Patricio Gabriel Araujo Vázquez (born 30 January 1988 in Colima, Mexico) is a Mexican former professional footballer who played as a centre-back.

== Club career ==
Araujo made his league debut for Chivas on 30 October 2005 against Morelia. He played in all 24 of Chivas's games as they won the Apertura 2006 tournament. His first league goal came on 13 October 2007 versus Necaxa. As of the end of the Apertura 2010 season Araujo had made over 130 league appearances for Chivas Guadalajara.

== International career ==
Patricio Araujo has played with the Mexico national football team in three categories. He played with the Mexico U-17, including six appearances during the 2005 FIFA U-17 World Championship in Peru, a tournament that Mexico won.

== Honours ==
Guadalajara

- Mexican Championship: Apertura 2006
- Copa Libertadores runner-up: 2010

Mexico U17

- FIFA U-17 World Championship: 2005
