= 2008 D.C. United season =

D.C. United
2008 season
- Owner: D.C. United Holdings
- Coach: Tom Soehn
- Major League Soccer: 10th
- MLS Cup: Did not qualify
- U.S. Open Cup: Champions
- CONCACAF Champions League: Group stage
- CONCACAF Champions' Cup: Semifinals
- Atlantic Cup: Champions
- Top goalscorer: Luciano Emilio (9 goals)
- Highest home attendance: 35,979 vs. LA (Jun 29)
- Lowest home attendance: 14,660 vs. HOU (Jul 23)
- Average home league attendance: 19,835
Home colors	Away colors

The 2008 D.C. United season was the fourteenth year of the club's existence, as well as their thirteenth season in Major League Soccer and their thirteenth consecutive season in the top tier of the American soccer pyramid.

To fans and the media alike, this year marked a downfall for the franchise, as well as end to what was considered a "second golden age" for the club in league play. The justification behind this involved the United failing to defend the Supporters' Shield, an awarded given to the MLS club with the best regular season record, for a third-consecutive year. With a 10th-place overall finish and a 6th-place finish in the Eastern Conference, United finished the lowest in the conference and league tables since 2002. With the subpar record, United failed to make the playoffs, having qualified since 2003.

Their performance league play reflected on the continental stage as well. Finishing as the 2007 MLS Supporters' Shield winners, United qualified for the inaugural CONCACAF Champions League. The tournament replaced the obsolete CONCACAF Champions' Cup, and was modeled similarly to its cousin tournament, the UEFA Champions League. In the Champions League, United continued their misfortunes, losing all their Group stage matches at home, and only managing to pick up one draw at Costa Rica's Saprissa. United finished in the bottom of Group C, with a record of 0–1–5 (W-T-L).

In spite of the poorer performance in league and continental play, United excelled in the U.S. Open Cup play, ultimately winning the domestic title against Charleston Battery, 2–1. The domestic cup title was their first since their inaugural season. The U.S. Open Cup, a domestic cup tournament much similar to the FA Cup runs parallel to the regular seasons of all tiers of professional and amateur soccer in the United States. The tournament is open for entry for any soccer club, professional or amateur, that is affiliated with the United States Soccer Federation. For MLS clubs, the top six American MLS clubs overall in the regular season are admitted entry into the third round proper, or round of 16, in the tournament. By finishing 1st overall in the regular season, United booked a third round entry in the tournament proper. The club opened Open Cup play with wins against Rochester Rhinos of the USL First Division (second tier) and New England Revolution of MLS (first tier) in the third round and quarterfinals respectively. In the semifinals, United won in extra time to defeat Chicago Fire. In the championship, United defeated Charleston Battery of the USL Second Division (third tier) to win the Open Cup for a second time in club history.

== Club ==
=== 2008 roster ===
Note: Flags indicate national team as defined under FIFA eligibility rules; some limited exceptions apply. Players may hold more than one non-FIFA nationality.

No.	Pos.	Nation	Player
1	GK	USA	Zach Wells
2	DF	ARG	Gonzalo Peralta
3	MF	USA	Joe Vide
4	DF	USA	Marc Burch
5	MF	USA	Quavas Kirk
6	MF	USA	Domenic Mediate
7	MF	BRA	Fred
8	DF	SLE	Ibrahim Koroma
10	MF	ARG	Marcelo Gallardo
11	FW	BRA	Luciano Emilio
12	MF	HON	Iván Guerrero
13	DF	USA	Ryan Miller
14	MF	USA	Ben Olsen
15	MF	RUS	Rod Dyachenko
16	DF	USA	Greg Janicki

No.	Pos.	Nation	Player
17	FW	RSA	Thabiso Khumalo
18	DF	USA	Devon McTavish
19	MF	USA	Clyde Simms
20	DF	USA	Mike Zaher
21	DF	USA	Pat Carroll
22	MF	USA	Ryan Cordeiro
23	DF	COL	Gonzalo Martínez
24	MF	USA	Jeff Carroll
25	FW	USA	Santino Quaranta
26	DF	USA	Bryan Namoff
27	GK	LBR	Louis Crayton
28	MF	ARG	Jonathan La Rosa
30	FW	LBR	Francis Doe
40	GK	USA	James Thorpe
99	FW	BOL	Jaime Moreno (captain)

== Transfers ==
=== In ===
Date	Player	Position	Previous club	Fee/notes	Ref
January 18, 2008	(United States) Ryan Cordeiro	MF / FW	(United States) University of Connecticut	2008 MLS SuperDraft, Round 3 selection	
January 22, 2008	(Argentina) Gonzalo Peralta	DF	(Argentina) Almirante Brown	Free, Discovery Player	
January 29, 2008	(Argentina) Marcelo Gallardo	MF	(France) Paris Saint-Germain	Free	
March 1, 2008	(United States) Pat Carroll	DF	(United States) West Virginia University	Free	
March 15, 2008	(United States) Quavas Kirk	MF	(United States) Los Angeles Galaxy	Traded for Greg Vanney	
March 27, 2008	(United States) James Thorpe	GK	(United States) Franklin Pierce College	Developmental contract	
April 17, 2008	(United States) Mike Zaher	DF	(Canada) Toronto FC	Traded for undisclosed SuperDraft pick	
April 23, 2008	(Liberia) Francis Doe	FW	(United States) New York Red Bulls	Waived by New York, free transfer	
June 30, 2008	(United States) Craig Thompson	MF	(United States) Houston Dynamo	Free	
July 16, 2008	(United States) Joe Vide	MF	(United States) San Jose Earthquakes	Free	
July 31, 2008	(Honduras) Iván Guerrero	MF	(United States) San Jose Earthquakes	Trade for partial allocation	
August 7, 2008	(Liberia) Louis Crayton	GK	(Switzerland) Basel	Undisclosed	
September 15, 2008	(United States) Ryan Miller	DF / MF	(United States) Cleveland City Stars	Free	
September 16, 2008	(United States) Greg Janicki	MF	(United States) Pittsburgh Riverhounds	Loaned, subsequently signed developmental contract	

=== Loan ===
==== In ====
Player	Pos.	From	Start	End	Ref
(Argentina) Franco Niell	FW	(Argentina) Argentinos Juniors	January 22, 2008	June 28, 2008 (waived)	
(Sierra Leone) Ibrahim Koroma	DF	(Sierra Leone) Kallon	September 1, 2008	January 31, 2009	
(South Africa) Thabiso Khumalo	MF / FW	(United States) Pittsburgh Riverhounds	September 1, 2008	January 31, 2009	

== Standings ==
=== Major League Soccer ===
Conference Standings

Pos	Team	Pld	W	L	T	GF	GA	GD	Pts	Qualification
1	Columbus Crew	30	17	7	6	50	36	+14	57	MLS Cup Playoffs
2	Chicago Fire	30	13	10	7	44	33	+11	46	MLS Cup Playoffs
3	New England Revolution	30	12	11	7	40	43	−3	43	MLS Cup Playoffs
4	Kansas City Wizards	30	11	10	9	37	39	−2	42	MLS Cup Playoffs
5	New York Red Bulls	30	10	11	9	42	48	−6	39	MLS Cup Playoffs
6	D.C. United	30	11	15	4	43	51	−8	37	
7	Toronto FC	30	9	13	8	34	43	−9	35	

Source: MLS

Overall Table

Pos	Team	Pld	W	L	T	GF	GA	GD	Pts	Qualification
1	Columbus Crew (C, S)	30	17	7	6	50	36	+14	57	CONCACAF Champions League
2	Houston Dynamo	30	13	5	12	45	32	+13	51	CONCACAF Champions League
3	Chicago Fire	30	13	10	7	44	33	+11	46	North American SuperLiga
4	Chivas USA	30	12	11	7	40	41	−1	43	North American SuperLiga
5	New England Revolution	30	12	11	7	40	43	−3	43	North American SuperLiga
6	Kansas City Wizards	30	11	10	9	37	39	−2	42	North American SuperLiga
7	Real Salt Lake	30	10	10	10	40	39	+1	40	
8	New York Red Bulls	30	10	11	9	42	48	−6	39	CONCACAF Champions League
9	Colorado Rapids	30	11	14	5	44	45	−1	38	
10	D.C. United	30	11	15	4	43	51	−8	37	CONCACAF Champions League
11	FC Dallas	30	8	10	12	45	41	+4	36	
12	Toronto FC	30	9	13	8	34	43	−9	35	CONCACAF Champions League (Note: As winners of the 2009 Canadian Championship)
13	LA Galaxy	30	8	13	9	55	62	−7	33	
14	San Jose Earthquakes	30	8	13	9	32	38	−6	33	

Source: MLS
Rules for classification: 1) points; 2) head-to-head record; 3) goal difference; 4) number of goals scored
(C) Champions; (S) Supporters' Shield

=== CONCACAF Champions League ===
Group A

Club	Pld	W	D	L	GF	GA	GD	Pts
(Honduras) Marathón	6	4	1	1	12	5	+7	13
(Mexico) Cruz Azul	6	3	1	2	8	4	+4	10
(Costa Rica) Saprissa	6	3	1	2	7	9	−2	10
(United States) D.C. United	6	0	1	5	4	13	−9	1

== Match results ==
=== MLS ===
Win	Tie	Loss

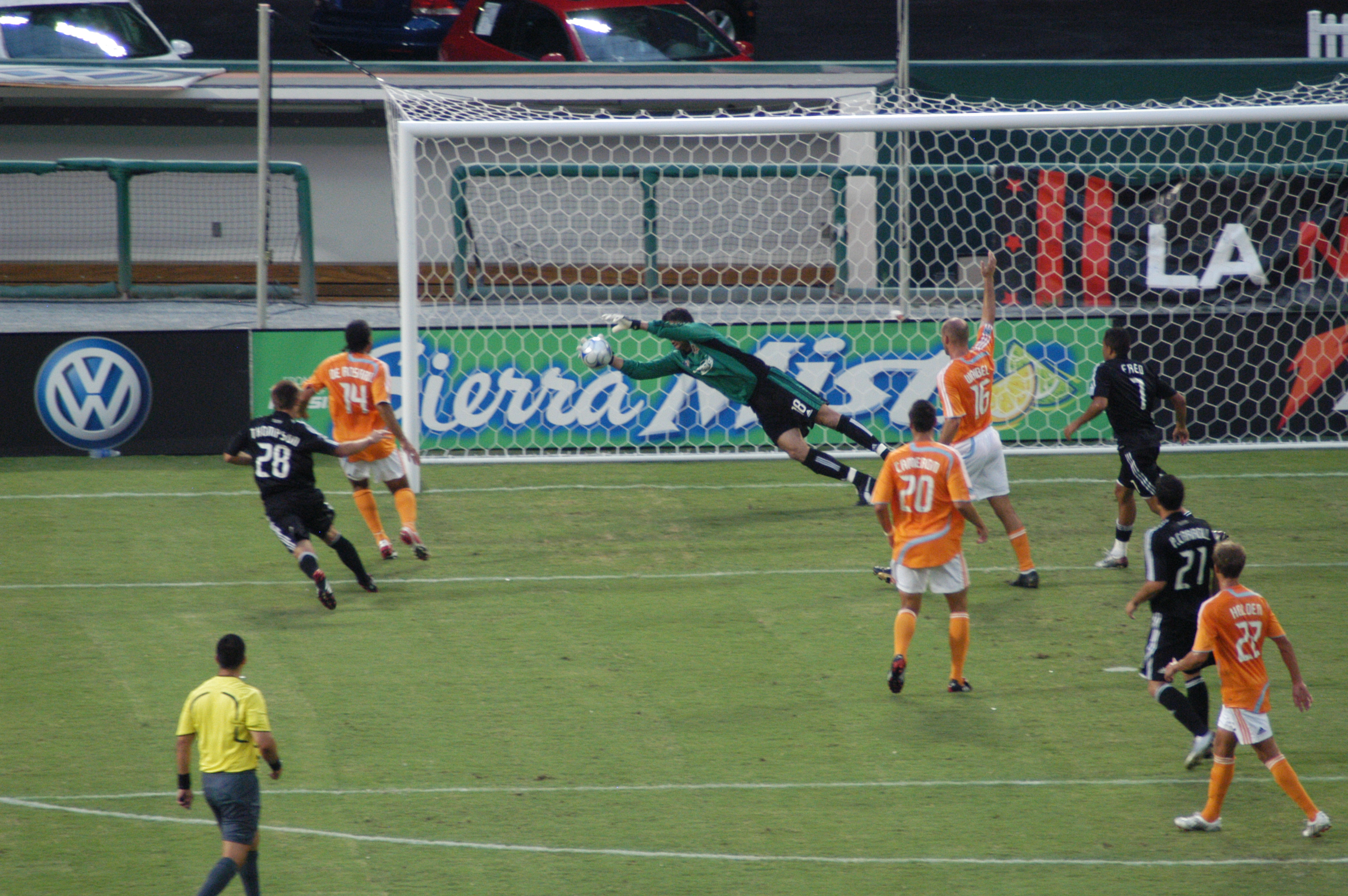
D.C. United playing Houston Dynamo in the 2008 SuperLiga.

Date	Opponent	Venue	Result	Attendance	Scorers	Ref.
March 29, 2008	Kansas City Wizards	A	0–2	10,385		
April 5, 2008	Toronto FC	H	4–1	20,161	Emilio, Quaranta, Gallardo, Moreno	
April 12, 2008	Real Salt Lake	A	0-4	13,193		
April 17, 2008	Columbus Crew	H	1–2	13,329	Namoff	
April 26, 2008	Real Salt Lake	H	4-1	23,269	Moreno (2), Quaranta, Gallardo	
May 4, 2008	Colorado Rapids	A	0-2	13,115		
May 8, 2008	Chicago Fire	H	0–2	18,605		
May 17, 2008	Chivas USA	A	1–3	13,113	Gallardo	
May 21, 2008	Toronto FC	A	0-1	19,791		
May 24, 2008	Toronto FC	H	3–2	18,647	Peralta, Moreno, Emilio	
May 29, 2008	New England Revolution	A	2–2	8,159	Emilio, Fred	
June 7, 2008	Chicago Fire	A	1–2	19,256	Moreno, Emilio	
June 14, 2008	New York Red Bulls	H	4-1	18,622	Emilio (3), Simms	
June 22, 2008	San Jose Earthquakes	H	3–1	17,922	Simms, Martínez, Emilio	
June 29, 2008	Los Angeles Galaxy	H	4–1	35,979	Moreno, Emilio (2), Gallardo	
July 23, 2008	Houston Dynamo	H	0–2	14,460		
August 2, 2008	Kansas City Wizards	H	2–0	18,731	Emilio, Moreno	
August 10, 2008	New York Red Bulls	A	1-4	15,038	Moreno	
August 16, 2008	Chicago Fire	A	0–1	19,560	Fred	
August 20, 2008	New England Revolution	A	1-2	14,962	Moreno	
August 23, 2008	Colorado Rapids	H	3–0	17,283	Vide, Quaranta, Kirk	
August 30, 2008	New York Red Bulls	H	0–0	15,616		
September 6, 2008	San Jose Earthquakes	A	1-2	10,121	Quaranta	
September 13, 2008	FC Dallas	H	2–2	19,890	Moreno, Quaranta	
September 20, 2008	Los Angeles Galaxy	A	2-5	27,000	McTavish, Khumalo	
September 28, 2008	FC Dallas	A	0-3	12,138		
October 4, 2008	Chivas USA	H	0–3	28,145		
October 12, 2008	Houston Dynamo	A	0–0	17,531		
October 16, 2008	New England Revolution	H	2–1	16,672	Doe (2)	
October 26, 2008	Columbus Crew	A	0-1	19,591		

=== CONCACAF Champions' Cup ===
Win	Tie	Loss

Round	Date	Opponent	Venue	Result	Attendance	Scorers	Ref.
QF	March 12, 2008	(Jamaica) Harbour View	A	1–1	6,985	McTavish	
QF	March 18, 2008	(Jamaica) Harbour View	H	5–0	12,394	McTavish (2), Emilio (2), Fred	
SF	April 1, 2008	(Mexico) Pachuca	A	0–2	18,642		
SF	April 9, 2008	(Mexico) Pachuca	H	2–1	17,329	Dyachenko, Niell	

=== CONCACAF Champions League ===
Win	Tie	Loss

Round	Date	Opponent	Venue	Result	Attendance	Scorers	Ref.
GS	September 16, 2008	(Costa Rica) Saprissa	H	0–2	6,105		
GS	September 24, 2008	(Honduras) Marathón	A	0-2	8,000		
GS	October 1, 2008	(Mexico) Cruz Azul	H	0–1	7,124		
GS	October 9, 2008	(Costa Rica) Saprissa	A	2–2	10,000	Doe, Dyachenko	
GS	October 21, 2008	(Mexico) Cruz Azul	A	0-2	4,265		
GS	October 29, 2008	(Honduras) Marathón	H	2–4	7,156	Doe, Janicki	

=== U.S. Open Cup ===
Win	Tie	Loss

Round	Date	Opponent	Venue	Result	Attendance	Scorers	Ref.
R3	July 1, 2008	Rochester Rhinos	H	2–0	2,752	Burch (2)	
QF	July 8, 2008	Chicago Fire	H	2–1 (a.e.t.)	4,118	Doe, Namoff	
SF	August 12, 2008	New England Revolution	H	3–1	6,797	Emilio (2), Quaranta	
F	September 3, 2008	Charleston Battery	H	2–1	8,212	Emilio, Fred	
