= 2008 in American soccer =

Soccer in the United States
- Season: 2008

Men's soccer
- Supporters' Shield: Columbus Crew
- MLS Cup: Columbus Crew

The 2008 season was the 96th year of competitive soccer in the United States.

== National team ==
=== Men ===
==== Senior ====
Wins	Losses	Draws
9	3	2

The home team or the team that is designated as the home team is listed in the left column; the away team is in the right column.

Win Draw Loss

January 19 International Friendly	United States	2–0	Sweden	Carson, California
17:30 UTC−08	Robinson 15'; Donovan 48'	(Report)		Stadium: Home Depot Center; Attendance: 14,878; Referee: Mauricio Navarro (Canada)

February 6 International Friendly	United States	2–2	Mexico	Houston, Texas
20:25 UTC−05	Onyewu 29'; Altidore 40'	(Report)	Magallón 35', 47'	Stadium: Reliant Stadium; Attendance: 70,103; Referee: Carlos Batres (Guatemala)

March 26 International Friendly	Poland	0–3	United States	Kraków, Poland
20:30 UTC+01		(Report)	Bocanegra 12'; Onyewu 35'; Lewis 73'	Stadium: Wisla Stadium; Attendance: 20,000; Referee: Anders Hermansen (Denmark)

May 28 International Friendly	England	2–0	United States	London, England
20:00 UTC+0	Terry 38'; Gerrard 59'	(Report)		Stadium: Wembley Stadium; Attendance: 71,233; Referee: Kyros Vassaras (Denmark)

June 4 International Friendly	Spain	1–0	United States	Santander, Spain
20:00 UTC+01	Xavi 79'	(Report)		Stadium: Estadio El Sardinero; Attendance: 14,232; Referee: Sokol Jareci (Albania)

June 8 International Friendly	United States	0–0	Argentina	East Rutherford, New Jersey
19:30 UTC-04		(Report)		Stadium: Giants Stadium; Attendance: 78,682; Referee: Joel Aguilar (El Salvador)

June 15 World Cup Qualifying 2nd Round	United States	8–0	Barbados	Carson, California
14:00 UTC-07	Dempsey 1', 63'; Bradley 12'; Ching 20', 89'; Donovan 59'; Johnson 82'; Ferguson 86' (o.g.)	(Report)		Stadium: Home Depot Center; Attendance: 11,476; Referee: Marco Antonio Rodriguez (Mexico)

June 22 World Cup Qualifying 2nd Round	Barbados	0–1	United States	Bridgetown, Barbados
15:00 UTC-04		(Report)	Lewis 21'	Stadium: Kensington Oval; Attendance: 2,000; Referee: Roberto Williams (Panama)

August 20 World Cup Qualifying 3rd Round	Guatemala	0–1	United States	Guatemala City, Guatemala
20:00 UTC-06		(Report)	Bocanegra 69'	Stadium: Estadio Mateo Flores; Attendance: 25,000; Referee: Enrico Wijngaarde (Suriname)

September 6 World Cup Qualifying 3rd Round	Cuba	0–1	United States	Havana, Cuba
20:00 UTC-04		(Report)	Dempsey 40'	Stadium: Estadio Pedro Marrero; Attendance: 12,000; Referee: Joel Aguilar (El Salvador)

September 10 World Cup Qualifying 3rd Round	United States	3–0	Trinidad and Tobago	Bridgeview, Illinois
19:00 UTC-05	Bradley 9'; Dempsey 18'; Ching 57'	(Report)		Stadium: Toyota Park; Attendance: 11,452; Referee: Courtney Campbell (Jamaica)

October 11 World Cup Qualifying 3rd Round	United States	6–1	Cuba	Washington, D.C.
19:00 UTC-04	Beasley 10', 30'; Donovan 48'; Ching 63'; Altidore 87'; Onyewu 90'	(Report)	Muñoz 32'	Stadium: RFK Stadium; Attendance: 20,293; Referee: Roberto Moreno Salazar (Panama)

October 15 World Cup Qualifying 3rd Round	Trinidad and Tobago	2–1	United States	Port of Spain, Trinidad and Tobago
20:00 UTC-04	Latapy 61'; Yorke 79' (pen.)	(Report)	Davies 75'	Stadium: Hasely Crawford Stadium; Attendance: 19,000; Referee: Wálter Quesada (Costa Rica)

November 19 World Cup Qualifying 3rd Round	United States	2–1	Guatemala	Commerce City, Colorado
18:10 UTC-07	Cooper 53'; Adu 68'	(Report)		Stadium: Dick's Sporting Goods Park; Attendance: 9,303; Referee: Benito Archundia (Mexico)

=== Women ===
==== Senior ====
Wins	Losses	Draws
33	1	2

The United States Women's National Soccer Team was coached by Pia Sundhage.

===== Four Nations tournament =====
January 16	United States	4–0	Canada	Guangzhou, China
1:00 p.m. UTC+08	Rodriguez 51', 65'; Tarpley 71', 78'	Report		Stadium: Guangdong Olympic Sports Center Stadium; Attendance: 1,000; Referee: Kirsi Savolainen (FIN); Assistant referees: Liu Hongjuan (CHN); Zhang Lingling (CHN); Fourth official: Gu Ying (CHN)

January 18	United States	4–1	Finland	Guangzhou, China
4:30 p.m. UTC+08	Tarpley 37', 39'; Cheney 69'; Woznuk 80'	Report	Sainio 54'	Stadium: Guangdong Olympic Sports Center Stadium; Attendance: 500; Referee: Gu Ying (CHN); Assistant referees: Liu Hongjuan (CHN); Cui Yongmei (CHN); Fourth official: Carol Anne Chenard (CAN)

January 20	United States	1–0	China	Guangzhou, China
3:30 p.m. UTC+08	Boxx 77'	Report		Stadium: Guangdong Olympic Sports Center Stadium; Attendance: 3,000; Referee: Carol Anne Chenard (CAN); Assistant referees: Liu Hongjuan (CHN); Liang Jianping (CHN); Fourth official: Kirsi Savolainene (FIN)

===== Algarve Cup =====
March 5 Group B	United States	4–0	China	Albufeira, Portugal
8:45 a.m. UTC-05	Tarpley 5'; Heath 47'; Wambach 64'; Lloyd 69'	Report		Stadium: Estádio Municipal; Attendance: 250; Referee: Jacqui Melksham (AUS); Assistant referees: Allyson Flynn (AUS); Jacqueline Leleu (AUS); Fourth official: Pannipar Kamnueng (THA)

March 7 Group B	United States	2–0	Italy	Alvor, Portugal
8:45 a.m. UTC-05	Tarpley 6'; O'Reilly 74'	Report		Stadium: Restinga Stadium; Attendance: 200; Referee: Pannipar Kamnueng (THA); Assistant referees: Kyoung Min Kim (KOR); Satomi Hamazaki (JPN); Fourth official: Sung Mi Cha (KOR)

March 10 Group B	United States	4–0	Norway	Alvor, Portugal
11:00 a.m. UTC-05	Kai 55'; Wambach 57'; O'Reilly 65'; Rodriguez 90'	Report		Stadium: Restinga Stadium; Attendance: 300; Referee: Bibiana Steinhaus (GER); Assistant referees: Vivian Peeters (NED); Alejandra Cercato (ARG); Fourth official: Alexandra Ihingova (ENG)

March 12 Final	United States	2–1	Denmark	Vila Real de San Antonio, Portugal
9:15 a.m. UTC-05	Kai 14'; Wambach 49'	Report	Sorsensen 30'	Stadium: Municipal Stadium; Attendance: 1,000; Referee: Tanja Schett (AUT); Assistant referees: Anna Nystrom (SWE); Helen Caro (SWE); Fourth official: Bibiana Steinhaus (GER)

===== 2008 Olympic qualifying =====
April 4 Group A	United States	6–0	Jamaica	Ciudad Juárez, Mexico
	Lloyd 16'; Cheney 21'; Wambach 53', 68'; O'Reilly 88'; Heath 90+5'	Report		Stadium: Estadio Olímpico Benito Juárez; Attendance: 5,083; Referee: Diane Ferreira-James (GUY); Assistant referees: Cynette Jeffrey (GUY); Isabel Tovar (MEX); Fourth official: Monique Ras (ARU)

Apr 6 Group A	United States	3–1	Mexico	Ciudad Juárez, Mexico
3:30 p.m. UTC-04	Kai 13', 45'; Wambach 32'	Report	Worbis 31'	Stadium: Estadio Olímpico Benito Juárez; Attendance: 22,280; Referee: Erika Vargas (CRC); Assistant referees: Cindy Mohammed (TRI); Lynda Bramble-Thompson (TRI); Fourth official: Carol Ann Chenard (CAN)

April 9 Semifinals	United States	3–0	Costa Rica	Ciudad Juárez, Mexico
7:00 p.m. UTC-04	Kai 57', 89'; O'Reilly 72'	Report		Stadium: Estadio Olímpico Benito Juárez; Attendance: 22,280; Referee: Diane Ferreira-James (GUY); Assistant referees: Isabel Tovar (MEX); Rita Munoz (MEX); Fourth official: Carol Ann Chenard (CAN)

April 12 Final	United States	1–1 (a.e.t.) (6–5 p)	Canada	Ciudad Juárez, Mexico
9:30 p.m. UTC-04	Lloyd 107'	Report	Tancredi 116'	Stadium: Estadio Olímpico Benito Juárez; Attendance: 4,151; Referee: Erika Vargas (CRC); Assistant referees: Cynette Jeffrey (GUY); Cindy Mohammed (TRI); Fourth official: Monique Ras (ARU)
	Penalties
	Lloyd (penalty scored); Hucles (penalty scored); Chalupny (penalty missed); Rampone (penalty scored); Wambach (penalty scored); Osborne (penalty scored); O'Reilly (penalty scored)		(penalty scored) Sinclair; (penalty missed) Franko; (penalty scored) Tancredi; (penalty scored) Rustad; (penalty scored) Lang; (penalty scored) Wilkinson; (penalty missed) Timko

===== International friendlies =====
April 27	United States	3–2	Australia	Cary, North Carolina
7:00 p.m. UTC-04	Kai 35'; Wambach 49'; Lloyd 90+1'	Report	Gill 86'; Salisbury	Stadium: WakeMed Soccer Park; Attendance: 3,698; Referee: Margaret Domka (USA); Assistant referees: Sharon Wheeler (USA); Kathleen Casto (USA); Fourth official: Chris Spivey (USA)

May 3	United States	5–4	Australia	Birmingham, Alabama
5:00 p.m. UTC-04	Tarpley 28', 42'; Wambach 29', 46'; Hucles 90+4'	Report	Whitehill 19' (o.g.); Walsh 49'; Colthorpe 64'; Rampone 69' (o.g.)	Stadium: Legion Field; Attendance: 5,000; Referee: Sandra Serafini (USA); Assistant referees: Sharon Wheeler (USA); Patrick Baker (USA); Fourth official: William Cleland (USA)

May 10	United States	6–0	Canada	Washington, D.C.
7:00 p.m. UTC-04	Tarpley 23'; Kai 54', 60', 75'; Lloyd 63'; Osborne 87'	Report		Stadium: RFK Stadium; Attendance: 9,332; Referee: Sandra Serafini (USA); Assistant referees: Debbie Coleman (USA); Meredith Hacket (USA); Fourth official: Byran Roslund (USA)

===== Peace Queen Cup =====
June 15 Group B	United States	2–1	Australia	Suwon, South Korea
1:00 a.m. UTC-04	Kai 35'; Wambach 77'	Report	Garriock 57'	Stadium: Suwon Sports Complex; Attendance: 1,357; Referee: Bibiana Steinhaus (GER); Assistant referees: Cristina Cini (ITA); Mi-Suk Park (KOR); Fourth official: Suk-Hee Kim (KOR)

June 17 Group B	United States	1–0	Brazil	Suwon, South Korea
1:00 a.m. UTC-04	Rodriguez 41'	Report		Stadium: Suwon Sports Complex; Attendance: 1,158; Referee: Jenny Palmqvist (SWE); Assistant referees: Mi-Suk Park (KOR); Soi-Gi Lee (KOR); Fourth official: Bibiana Steinhause (GER)

June 19 Group B	United States	2–0	Italy	Suwon, South Korea
4:00 a.m. UTC-04	Wambach 41', 51'	Report		Stadium: Suwon Sports Complex; Attendance: 1,075; Referee: Alexandra Ihringova (ENG); Assistant referees: Seul-Gi Lee (KOR); Jacqui Stephanson (NZL); Fourth official: Bibiana Steinhause (GER)

June 21 Final	United States	1–0	Canada	Suwon, South Korea
1:00 a.m. UTC-04	Hucles 90+2'	Report		Stadium: Suwon Sports Complex; Attendance: 25,280; Referee: Alexandra Ihringova (ENG); Assistant referees: Cristina Cini (ITA); Seul-Gi Lee (KOR); Fourth official: Bibiana Steinhause (GER)

===== International friendlies =====
July 2	United States	4–0	Norway	Fredrikstad, Norway
12:00 p.m. UTC-04	Tarpley 4'; Lloyd 52'; Hucles 84'; Wambach 87'	Report		Stadium: Fredrikstad Stadium; Attendance: 1,900; Referee: Claudine Brohlet (BEL); Assistant referees: Leen Martens (BEL); Anne Cheron (BEL); Fourth official: Ann Wenche Kleven (NOR)

July 5	United States	1–0	Sweden	Skellefteå, Sweden
12:00 p.m. UTC-04	Lloyd 39'	Report		Stadium: Norrvalla Stadium; Attendance: 4,313; Referee: Kirsi Savolainen (FIN); Assistant referees: Anu Jokela (FIN); Minna Niskanen (FIN); Fourth official: Camilla Thoren (SWE)

July 13	United States	1–0	Brazil	Commerce City, Colorado
4:00 p.m. UTC-04	Rodriguez 71'	Report		Stadium: Dick's Sporting Goods Park; Attendance: 15,071; Referee: Dallas Malhiwsky (USA); Assistant referees: Scott McCaslin (USA); Eric Bryan (USA); Fourth official: Robert Keiffer (USA)

July 16	United States	1–0	Brazil	San Diego, California
10:00 p.m. UTC-04	Kai 85'	Report		Stadium: Torero Stadium; Attendance: 7,502; Referee: Jen Bennett (USA); Assistant referees: Felisha Mariscal (USA); Shirin Nikpournezhati (USA); Fourth official: Bing Kongmebhol (USA)

===== 2008 Beijing Olympics =====
August 6 Group G	United States	0–2	Norway	Qinhuangdao, China
7:45 a.m. UTC-04		Report	Kaurin 2'; Wiik 4'	Stadium: Qinhuangdao Olympic Sports Center Stadium; Attendance: 17,673; Referee: Nicole Petignat (SUI); Assistant referees: Cristini Cini (ITA); Karine Vives Solana (FRA); Fourth official: Dagmar Damkova (CZE)

August 9 Group G	United States	1–0	Japan	Qinhuangdao, China
5:00 a.m. UTC-04	Lloyd 27'	Report		Stadium: Qinhuangdao Olympic Sports Center Stadium; Attendance: 16,912; Referee: Pannipar Kamnueng (THA); Assistant referees: Widiya Shamsuri (MAS); Ja Daw Kaw (MYA); Fourth official: Christine Beck(GER)

August 12 Group G	United States	4–0	New Zealand	Shenyang, China
7:45 a.m. UTC-04	O'Reilly 1'; Rodriguez 43'; Tarpley 56'; Hucles 60'	Report		Stadium: Shenyang Olympic Stadium; Attendance: 12,453; Referee: Dagmar Damkova (CZE); Assistant referees: Irina Mirt (ROM); Katarzyna Nadolska (POL); Fourth official: Huijun Niu (CHN)

August 15 Quarterfinals	United States	2–1 (a.e.t.)	Canada	Shanghai, China
6:00 a.m. UTC-04	Hucles 12'; Kai 101'	Report	Sinclair 30'	Stadium: Shanghai Stadium; Attendance: 26,129; Referee: Jenny Palmqvist (SWE); Assistant referees: Helen Caro (SWE); Hege Steinlund (NOR); Fourth official: Estela Alvarez (TOG)

August 18 Semifinals	United States	4–2	Japan	Beijing, China
9:00 a.m. UTC-04	Hucles 41', 80'; Chalupny 44'; O'Reilly 70'	Report	Ohno 16'; Arakawa 90+3'	Stadium: Workers Stadium; Attendance: 50,937; Referee: Nicole Petignat (SUI); Assistant referees: Cristini Cini (ITA); Karine Vives Solana (FRA); Fourth official: Pannipar Kamnueng (THA)

August 21 Gold Medal Match	United States	1–0 (a.e.t.)	Brazil	Beijing, China
9:00 a.m. UTC-04	Lloyd 96'	Report		Stadium: Workers Stadium; Attendance: 51,612; Referee: Dagmar Damkova (CZE); Assistant referees: Maria Luisa Villa Gutierrez (ESP); Hege Steinlund (NOR); Fourth official: Christine Beck (GER)

===== International friendlies =====
September 13	United States	2–0	Republic of Ireland	Philadelphia, Pennsylvania
8:00 p.m. UTC-04	Kai 32'; O'Reilly 86'	Report		Stadium: Lincoln Financial Field; Attendance: 13,176; Referee: Kari Seitz (USA); Assistant referees: Marlene Duffy (USA); Veronica Perez (USA); Fourth official: Teresa Miguel (USA)

September 17	United States	1–0	Republic of Ireland	East Rutherford, New Jersey
7:30 p.m. UTC-04	Kai 72'	Report		Stadium: Giants Stadium; Attendance: 4,227; Referee: Sandra Serafini (USA); Assistant referees: Debbie Coleman (USA); Meredith Hackett (USA); Fourth official: Danielle Magouirk (USA)

September 20	United States	2–0	Republic of Ireland	Bridgeview, Illinois
7:00 p.m. UTC-04	Chalupny 19'; Markgraf 31' (pen.)	Report		Stadium: Toyota Park; Attendance: 5,390; Referee: Jennifer Bennett (USA); Assistant referees: Stephanie Toth (USA); Veronica Hefner (USA); Fourth official: Margaret Domka (USA)

November 1	United States	3–1	South Korea	Richmond, Virginia
6:00 p.m. UTC-04	Hucles 26'; O'Reilly 38'; Tarpley 48'	Report	Han Song 71'	Stadium: University of Richmond Stadium; Attendance: 3,387; Referee: Deborah Coleman (USA); Assistant referees: Shannon Poplstein (USA); Melanie Johnson (USA); Fourth official: Meredith Hacket (USA)

November 5	United States	0–0	South Korea	Cincinnati, Ohio
7:30 p.m. UTC-04		Report		Stadium: Paul Brown Stadium; Attendance: 5,877; Referee: Veronica Brito (USA); Assistant referees: Rachelle Bramlege (USA); Mandy Love (USA); Fourth official: Michelle Cowman (USA)

November 8	United States	1–0	South Korea	Tampa, Florida
7:00 p.m. UTC-04	O'Reilly 72'	Report		Stadium: Raymond James Stadium; Attendance: 4,263; Referee: Meredith Hackett (USA); Assistant referees: Kristen Schiereck (USA); Christina Ibanez (USA); Fourth official: Margaret Reif (USA)

December 13	United States	1–0	China	Carson, California
9:00 p.m. UTC-04	Ellertson 61'	Report		Stadium: The Home Depot Center; Attendance: 3,619; Referee: Kari Seitz (USA); Assistant referees: Marlene Duffy (USA); Shirin Nikpour (USA); Fourth official: Susan Gazzuolo (USA)

December 17	United States	1–0	China	Detroit, Michigan
7:30 p.m. UTC-04	O'Reilly 32'	Report		Stadium: Ford Field; Attendance: 11,933; Referee: Margaret Domka (USA); Assistant referees: Amy Willing (USA); Tony Crush (USA); Fourth official: Susan Grobbel (USA)

== Major League Soccer ==
=== Table ===
Pos	Team	Pld	W	L	T	GF	GA	GD	Pts	
1	Columbus Crew (C, S)	30	17	7	6	50	36	+14	57	Qualification for the CONCACAF Champions League
2	Houston Dynamo	30	13	5	12	45	32	+13	51	Qualification for the CONCACAF Champions League
3	Chicago Fire	30	13	10	7	44	33	+11	46	Qualification for the North American SuperLiga
4	Chivas USA	30	12	11	7	40	41	−1	43	Qualification for the North American SuperLiga
5	New England Revolution	30	12	11	7	40	43	−3	43	Qualification for the North American SuperLiga
6	Kansas City Wizards	30	11	10	9	37	39	−2	42	Qualification for the North American SuperLiga
7	Real Salt Lake	30	10	10	10	40	39	+1	40	
8	New York Red Bulls	30	10	11	9	42	48	−6	39	Qualification for the CONCACAF Champions League
9	Colorado Rapids	30	11	14	5	44	45	−1	38	
10	D.C. United (U)	30	11	15	4	43	51	−8	37	Qualification for the CONCACAF Champions League
11	FC Dallas	30	8	10	12	45	41	+4	36	
12	Toronto FC	30	9	13	8	34	43	−9	35	Qualification for the CONCACAF Champions League (Note: As winners of the 2009 Canadian Championship)
13	LA Galaxy	30	8	13	9	55	62	−7	33	
14	San Jose Earthquakes	30	8	13	9	32	38	−6	33	

Source: MLS
Rules for classification: 1) points; 2) head-to-head record; 3) goal difference; 4) number of goals scored
(C) MLS Cup champions; (S) Supporters' Shield winners; (U) U.S. Open Cup winners

=== Playoffs ===
Conference Semifinals
E1	Columbus Crew	1	2
E4	Kansas City Wizards	1	0
Eastern Conference
E3	New England Revolution	0	0
E2	Chicago Fire	0	3
W1	Houston Dynamo	1	0
W4	New York Red Bulls^{1}	1	3
Western Conference
W3	Real Salt Lake	1	2
W2	Chivas USA	0	2

Conference Finals
E1	Columbus Crew	2
E2	Chicago Fire	1
W4	New York Red Bulls	1
W3	Real Salt Lake	0

MLS Cup 2008
E1	Columbus Crew	3
W4	New York Red Bulls	1

^{1} The New York Red Bulls earned the eighth and final playoff berth, despite finishing fifth in the Eastern Conference. They represent the fourth seed in the Western Conference playoff bracket, as only three teams in the Western Conference qualified for the playoffs.

=== MLS Cup ===
November 23
12:30 UTC−08

Columbus Crew	3–1	New York Red Bulls
Moreno 31'; Marshall 53'; Hejduk 82'	(Report)	Wolyniec 51'

Home Depot Center, Carson, California
Attendance: 27,000
Referee: Baldomero Toledo

== USL First Division ==
=== Table ===
Commissioner's Cup, bye to semifinal round of playoffs
First round of playoffs

Pos	Club	Pts	Pld	W	L	T	GF	GA	GD	H2H Pts
1	Puerto Rico Islanders	54	30	15	6	9	43	23	+20	
2	Vancouver Whitecaps	53	30	15	7	8	34	28	+6	
3	Montreal Impact	42	30	12	12	6	33	28	+5	
4	Rochester Rhinos	41^{†}	30	11	10	9	35	32	+3	
5	Charleston Battery	40	30	11	12	7	34	36	−2	CHA: 4 pts SEA: 4 pts
6	Seattle Sounders	40	30	10	10	10	37	36	+1	CHA: 4 pts SEA: 4 pts
7	Minnesota Thunder	39	30	10	11	9	40	38	+2	
8	Carolina RailHawks	37	30	9	11	10	34	43	−9	
9	Miami FC	34	30	8	12	10	28	34	−6	MIA: 7 pts ATL: 1 pt
10	Atlanta Silverbacks	34	30	8	12	10	37	50	−13	MIA: 7 pts ATL: 1 pt
11	Portland Timbers	31	30	7	13	10	26	33	−7	

Tie-breaker order: 1. Head-to-head points; 2. Total wins; 3. Goal difference; 4. Goals for; 5. Lottery

^{†} Rochester deducted 1 point for use of an ineligible player on August 10, 2008

=== Playoffs ===
Teams will be re-seeded for semifinal matchups

First round September 26/28
1	Puerto Rico Islanders
bye
4	Rochester Rhinos	2	0	2
5	Charleston Battery	0	1	1
3	Montreal Impact	1	3	4
6	Seattle Sounders	2	1	3
2	Vancouver Whitecaps	2	3	5
7	Minnesota Thunder	0	4	4

Semifinals; October 3/5
1	Puerto Rico Islanders (AET)	0	3	3
4	Rochester Rhinos	2	0	2
2	Vancouver Whitecaps	0	2	2
3	Montreal Impact	1	0	1

Final; October 12
1	Puerto Rico Islanders	1
2	Vancouver Whitecaps	2

=== Final ===
October 12
19:00 UTC−08

Vancouver Whitecaps	2–1	Puerto Rico Islanders
Gbeke 55', 74'	(Report)	Gbandi 68'

Swangard Stadium, Burnaby, Canada

== USL Second Division ==
=== Table ===
Place	Team	P	W	L	T	GF	GA	GD	Points
1	Charlotte Eagles	20	13	2	5	45	15	+30	44
2	Richmond Kickers	20	14	4	2	48	20	+28	44
3	Cleveland City Stars	20	10	3	7	33	16	+17	37
4	Crystal Palace Baltimore	20	11	8	1	30	30	0	34
5	Harrisburg City Islanders	20	7	3	10	33	20	+13	31
6	Western Mass Pioneers	20	5	9	6	19	29	−10	20†
7	Wilmington Hammerheads	20	4	9	7	32	33	−1	19
8	Pittsburgh Riverhounds	20	4	10	6	25	37	−12	18
9	Bermuda Hogges	20	5	13	2	21	50	−29	17
10	Real Maryland Monarchs	20	3	15	2	15	51	−36	10†

† Western Mass and Real Maryland deducted 1 point

=== Playoffs ===
Quarterfinals; August 13
4	Crystal Palace Baltimore (AET/PK)	2 (7)
5	Harrisburg City Islanders	2 (6)
3	Cleveland City Stars	4
6	Western Mass Pioneers	2

Semifinals; August 16
1	Charlotte Eagles	2
4	Crystal Palace Baltimore	1
2	Richmond Kickers	0
3	Cleveland City Stars(AET)	1

Final; August 23
1	Charlotte Eagles	1
3	Cleveland City Stars	2

=== Final ===
August 23
20:00 UTC−04

Cleveland City Stars	2–1	Charlotte Eagles
Shak 15' (o.g.); Bundu 39'	(Report)	Kabwe 87'

Krenzler Field, Cleveland, Ohio

== Lamar Hunt U.S. Open Cup ==
Third round July 1
MLS	D.C. United	2
USL-1	Rochester Rhinos	0
MLS	Chicago Fire	4
USL-2	Cleveland City Stars	1
MLS	New England Revolution	3
USL-2	Richmond Kickers	0
USL-2	Crystal Palace Baltimore	2
MLS	New York Red Bulls	0
MLS	FC Dallas	2
USL-1	Miami FC	1
USL-1	Charleston Battery (p)	1 (4)
MLS	Houston Dynamo	1 (3)
USL-1	Seattle Sounders	2
MLS	Chivas USA	0
USL-1	Carolina RailHawks	2
MLS	Kansas City Wizards (aet)	4

Quarterfinals; July 8
MLS	D.C. United (aet)	2
MLS	Chicago Fire	1
MLS	New England Revolution (p)	1 (5)
USL-2	Crystal Palace Baltimore	1 (3)
MLS	FC Dallas	1
USL-1	Charleston Battery	3
USL-1	Seattle Sounders (p)	0 (6)
MLS	Kansas City Wizards	0 (5)

Semifinals; August 12
MLS	D.C. United	3
MLS	New England Revolution	1
USL-1	Charleston Battery (p)	1 (4)
USL-1	Seattle Sounders	1 (3)

Final; September 3
MLS	D.C. United	2
USL-1	Charleston Battery	1

=== Final ===
September 3
19:30 UTC−04

Charleston Battery	1–2	D.C. United
Fuller 10'	(Report)	Emilio 4'; Fred 50'

RFK Stadium, Washington, D.C.
Attendance: 8,212
Referee: Mark Geiger

== American clubs in international competitions ==
Club	Competition	Final round
Houston Dynamo	2008–09 CONCACAF Champions League	Quarterfinals
Houston Dynamo	2008 North American SuperLiga	Final
Houston Dynamo	2008 Pan-Pacific Championship	Final
New England Revolution	2008–09 CONCACAF Champions League	Preliminary round
New England Revolution	2008 North American SuperLiga	Winner
D.C. United	2008–09 CONCACAF Champions League	Group stage
D.C. United	2008 North American SuperLiga	Group stage
Chivas USA	2008–09 CONCACAF Champions League	Preliminary round
Chivas USA	2008 North American SuperLiga	Group stage
Los Angeles Galaxy	2008 Pan-Pacific Championship	Third place

=== Houston Dynamo ===
February 20 Pan-Pacific Semifinal	Houston (United States)	3–0	(Australia) Sydney FC	Honolulu, Hawaii
20:30 UTC-10	De Rosario 28'; Holden 29'; Wondolowski 43'	(report)		Stadium: Aloha Stadium; Attendance: 15,128; Referee: Alex Prus

February 23 Pan-Pacific Final	Gamba Osaka (Japan)	6–1	(United States) Houston	Honolulu, Hawaii
20:30 UTC-10	Baré 13', 25', 59', 71'; Lucas 62'; Yamazaki 77'	(report)	Clark 10'	Stadium: Aloha Stadium; Attendance: 23,087; Referee: Kevin Stott

July 12 SuperLiga group stage	Houston (United States)	4–0	(Mexico) Atlante	Houston, Texas
21:00 UTC-05	De Rosario 20'; Holden 21', 29'; Mullan 54'	Report		Stadium: Robertson Stadium; Attendance: 13,105; Referee: Courtney Campbell (Jamaica)

July 15 SuperLiga group stage	Houston (United States)	0–1	(Mexico) Guadalajara	Houston, Texas
21:00 UTC-05		Report	Arellano 71'	Stadium: Robertson Stadium; Attendance: 28,723; Referee: Enrico Wijngaarde (Suriname)

July 19 SuperLiga group stage	D.C. United (United States)	1–3	(United States) Houston	Washington, D.C.
20:00 UTC-04	Doe 76'	Report	Clark 12'; Boswell 29'; Holden 84'	Stadium: RFK Stadium; Attendance: 12,893; Referee: Alex Prus

July 29 SuperLiga Semifinal	Houston (United States)	2–0	(Mexico) Pachuca	Houston, Texas
21:00 UTC-05	Boswell 77'; Ashe 87'	Report		Stadium: Robertson Stadium; Attendance: 16,679; Referee: Neal Brizan (Trinidad & Tobago)

August 5 SuperLiga Final	New England (United States)	2–2 (a.e.t.) (6–5 p)	(United States) Houston	Foxborough, Massachusetts
20:00 UTC-04	Ralston 41'; Joseph 102'	Report	Jaqua 18'; Kamara 98'	Stadium: Gillette Stadium; Attendance: 9,242; Referee: Howard Webb (England)
	Penalties
	Ralston (penalty scored); Reis (penalty missed); Joseph (penalty scored); Twellman (penalty scored); Smith (penalty missed); Larentowicz (penalty scored); Tierney (penalty scored); Albright (penalty scored)		(penalty scored) Waibel; (penalty scored) Wondolowski; (penalty missed) De Rosario; (penalty missed) Ching; (penalty scored) Clark; (penalty scored) Barrett; (penalty scored) Kamara; (penalty missed) Ashe

September 23 Champions League group stage	San Francisco (Panama)	0–0	(United States) Houston	Panama City, Panama
19:00 UTC-05		(Report)		Stadium: Estadio Nacional Rod Carew; Attendance: 3,400; Referee: Geoffrey Hospedales (Trinidad & Tobago)

September 30 Champions League group stage	Universidad Nacional (Mexico)	4–4	(United States) Houston	Mexico City, Mexico
21:00 UTC-05	López 18'; Juárez 26'; Palencia 41'; Verón 45+2'	(Report)	Waibel 3', 50'; Kamara 16', 33' (pen.)	Stadium: Estadio Olímpico Universitario; Attendance: 9,179; Referee: Wálter Quesada (Costa Rica)

October 7 Champions League group stage	Houston (United States)	2–1	(Panama) San Francisco	Houston, Texas
21:00 UTC-05	Wondolowski 13'; De Rosario 88'	(Report)	Pérez 47'	Stadium: Robertson Stadium; Attendance: 4,178; Referee: Benito Archundia (Mexico)

October 22 Champions League group stage	Houston (United States)	1–3	(Mexico) Universidad Nacional	Houston, Texas
22:00 UTC-05	Palacios 39' (o.g.)	(Report)	Cacho 18' (pen.); Espinoza 30'; Palacios 70'	Stadium: Robertson Stadium; Attendance: 8,741; Referee: Neal Brizan (Trinidad & Tobago)

October 28 Champions League group stage	Luis Ángel Firpo (El Salvador)	1–1	(United States) Houston	San Salvador, El Salvador
20:00 UTC-06	Leguizamón 87'	(Report)	Holden 16'	Stadium: Estadio Cuscatlán; Attendance: 3,000; Referee: Jorge Gasso (Mexico)

November 26 Champions League group stage	Houston (United States)	1–0	(El Salvador) Luis Ángel Firpo	Houston, Texas
19:00 UTC-06	Ching 13'	(Report)		Stadium: Robertson Stadium; Attendance: 14.142; Referee: Roberto García (Mexico)

=== New England Revolution ===
July 13 SuperLiga group stage	New England Revolution (United States)	1–0	(Mexico) Santos Laguna	Foxborough, Massachusetts
20:00 UTC-04	Dube 70'	Report		Stadium: Gillette Stadium; Attendance: 10,118; Referee: Enrico Wijngaarde (Suriname)

July 16 SuperLiga group stage	New England Revolution (United States)	1–0	(Mexico) Pachuca	Foxborough, Massachusetts
20:00 UTC-04	Smith 90+6' (pen.)	Report		Stadium: Gillette Stadium; Attendance: 9,614; Referee: Wálter Quesada (Costa Rica)

July 20 SuperLiga group stage	Chivas USA (United States)	1–1	(United States) New England Revolution	Fullerton, California
17:00 UTC-07	Razov 59'	Report	Joseph 78'	Stadium: Titan Stadium; Attendance: 4,738; Referee: Abiodun Okulaja

July 30 SuperLiga Semifinal	New England Revolution (United States)	1–0	(Mexico) Atlante	Foxborough, Massachusetts
20:00 UTC-04	Joseph 30'	Report		Stadium: Gillette Stadium; Attendance: 8,302; Referee: Carlos Batres (Guatemala)

August 5 SuperLiga Final	New England (United States)	2–2 (a.e.t.) (6–5 p)	(United States) Houston	Foxborough, Massachusetts
20:00 UTC-04	Ralston 41'; Joseph 102'	Report	Jaqua 18'; Kamara 98'	Stadium: Gillette Stadium; Attendance: 9,242; Referee: Howard Webb (England)
	Penalties
	Ralston (penalty scored); Reis (penalty missed); Joseph (penalty scored); Twellman (penalty scored); Smith (penalty missed); Larentowicz (penalty scored); Tierney (penalty scored); Albright (penalty scored)		(penalty scored) Waibel; (penalty scored) Wondolowski; (penalty missed) De Rosario; (penalty missed) Ching; (penalty scored) Clark; (penalty scored) Barrett; (penalty scored) Kamara; (penalty missed) Ashe

August 26 Champions League preliminary round	Joe Public (Trinidad and Tobago)	2–1	(United States) New England Revolution	Macoya, Trinidad and Tobago
21:00 UTC-04	Richardson 50'; Gay 70'	Report	Castro 76' (pen.)	Stadium: Marvin Lee Stadium; Attendance: 2,100; Referee: Courtney Campbell (Jamaica)

September 2 Champions League preliminary round	New England Revolution (United States)	0–4	(Trinidad and Tobago) Joe Public	Foxborough, Massachusetts
20:00 UTC-04		Report	Richardson 17', 45', 81'; Nelson 48'	Stadium: Gillette Stadium; Attendance: 4,000; Referee: Steven Depiero (Canada)

=== D.C. United ===
July 12 SuperLiga group stage	D.C. United (United States)	1–2	(Mexico) Guadalajara	Washington, D.C.
20:00 UTC-04	Emilio 76'	Report	23'Arellano; 72' Pineda	Stadium: RFK Stadium; Attendance: 22,453; Referee: Wálter Quesada (Costa Rica)

July 15 SuperLiga group stage	D.C. United (United States)	2–3	(Mexico) Atlante	Washington, D.C.
20:00 UTC-04	Doe 28'; Emilio 79'	Report	15', 44' Gabriel Rey; 49' Bermúdez	Stadium: RFK Stadium; Attendance: 12.122; Referee: Carlos Batres (Guatemala)

July 19 SuperLiga group stage	D.C. United (United States)	1–3	(United States) Houston	Washington, D.C.
20:00 UTC-04	Doe 76'	Report	12' Clark; 29' Boswell; 84' Holden	Stadium: RFK Stadium; Attendance: 12,893; Referee: Alex Prus

September 16 Champions League group stage	D.C. United (United States)	0–2	(Costa Rica) Saprissa	Washington, D.C.
20:00 UTC-04		(Report)	32' Centeno; 52' Arrieta	Stadium: RFK Stadium; Attendance: 6,105; Referee: Marco Rodríguez (Mexico)

September 24 Champions League group stage	Marathón (Honduras)	2–0	(United States) D.C. United	San Pedro Sula, Honduras
20:00 UTC-06	Núñez 65'; Norales 82'	(Report)		Stadium: Estadio Olímpico Metropolitano; Attendance: 8,000; Referee: Wálter Quesada (Costa Rica)

October 1 Champions League group stage	D.C. United (United States)	0–1	(Mexico) Cruz Azul	Washington, D.C.
20:00 UTC-04		(Report)	56' Zeballos	Stadium: RFK Stadium; Attendance: 7,214; Referee: Paul Ward (Canada)

October 9 Champions League group stage	Saprissa (Costa Rica)	2–2	(United States) D.C. United	San José, Costa Rica
20:00 UTC-06	Elizondo 82', 86'	(Report)	6' Doe; Dyachenko 90+2'	Stadium: Estadio Ricardo Saprissa; Attendance: 10,000; Referee: German Arredondo (Mexico)

October 21 Champions League group stage	Cruz Azul (Mexico)	2–0	(United States) D.C. United	Mexico City, Mexico
21:00 UTC-05	Vigneri 36'; Zeballos 88'	(Report)		Stadium: Estadio Azul; Attendance: 4,265; Referee: Roberto Moreno (Panama)

October 29 Champions League group stage	D.C. United (United States)	2–4	(Honduras) Marathón	Washington, D.C.
20:00 UTC-04	Doe 10'; Janicki 61'	(Report)	31' Martínez; 46' Berríos; 53'Núñez; 68' Chávez	Stadium: RFK Stadium; Attendance: 7,156; Referee: Benito Archundia (Mexico)

=== Chivas USA ===
July 13 SuperLiga group stage	Chivas USA (United States)	1–2	(Mexico) Pachuca	Carson, California
19:00 UTC-07	Razov 16'	Report	Marioni 23'; Caballero 42'	Stadium: Home Depot Center; Attendance: 14,528; Referee: Carlos Batres (Guatemala)

July 16 SuperLiga group stage	Chivas USA (United States)	1–0	(Mexico) Santos Laguna	Carson, California
19:00 UTC-07	Razov 73'	Report		Stadium: Home Depot Center; Attendance: 16,343; Referee: Courtney Campbell (Jamaica)

July 20 SuperLiga group stage	Chivas USA (United States)	1–1	(United States) New England Revolution	Fullerton, California
17:00 UTC-07	Razov 59'	Report	Joseph 78'	Stadium: Titan Stadium; Attendance: 4,738; Referee: Abiodun Okulaja

August 26 Champions League preliminary round	Tauro (Panama)	2–0	(United States) Chivas USA	Panama City, Panama
20:00 UTC-05	Aguilar 5', 65'	Report		Stadium: Estadio Nacional Rod Carew; Attendance: 500; Referee: Elmar Rodas (Guatemala)

September 7 Champions League preliminary round	Chivas USA (United States)	1–1	(Panama) Tauro	Carson, California
19:00 UTC-07	Nurse 42'	Report	Moreno 62'	Stadium: Home Depot Center; Attendance: 1,821; Referee: Mauricio Navarro (Canada)

=== Los Angeles Galaxy ===
February 20 Pan-Pacific Semifinal	Gamba Osaka (Japan)	1–0	(United States) Los Angeles	Honolulu, Hawaii
18:00 UTC-10	Baré 3'	(report)		Stadium: Aloha Stadium; Attendance: 15,128; Referee: Baldomero Toledo

February 23 Pan-Pacific third-place match	Los Angeles (United States)	2–1	(Australia) Sydney FC	Honolulu, Hawaii
18:00 UTC-10	Allen 3'; Tudela 45'	(report)	Renaud 42'	Stadium: Aloha Stadium; Attendance: 23,087; Referee: Brian Hall
