= 2008–09 CONCACAF Champions League preliminary round =

The 2008–09 CONCACAF Champions League preliminary round took place between 26 August 2008 and 4 September 2008. The eight winners advanced to the Group Stage.

== Summary ==
Team 1	Agg.	Team 2	1st leg	2nd leg
Jalapa (Guatemala)	1–5	(Panama) San Francisco	1–0	0–5
Joe Public (Trinidad and Tobago)	6–1	(United States) New England Revolution	2–1	4–0
Alajuelense (Costa Rica)	2–3	Puerto Rico Islanders	1–1	1–2
Cruz Azul (Mexico)	12–0	(Belize) Hankook Verdes	6–0	6–0
Harbour View (Jamaica)	0–3	(Mexico) Universidad Nacional	N/A	0–3
Tauro (Panama)	3–1	(United States) Chivas USA	2–0	1–1
Montreal Impact (Canada)	1–0	(Nicaragua) Real Estelí	1–0	0–0
Isidro Metapán (El Salvador)	3–4	(Honduras) Marathón	2–2	1–2

== Matches ==
All times local

=== First leg ===
27 August 2008
19:00 (UTC-5)

Cruz Azul (Mexico)	6–0	(Belize) Hankook Verdes
Torrado 17'; Andrade 19', 72'; Orozco 38', 67', 87'	Report

Estadio Azul, Mexico City
Attendance: 5,000
Referee: Luis Rodríguez (Panama)

26 August 2008
20:00 (UTC-5)

Tauro (Panama)	2–0	(United States) Chivas USA
Aguilar 5', 65'	Report

Estadio Nacional Rod Carew, Panama City
Attendance: 500
Referee: Elmar Rodas (Guatemala)

26 August 2008
21:00 (UTC-4)

Joe Public (Trinidad and Tobago)	2–1	(United States) New England Revolution
Richardson 50'; Gay 70'	Report	Castro 76' (pen.)

Marvin Lee Stadium, Macoya
Attendance: 2,100
Referee: Courtney Campbell (Jamaica)

27 August 2008
19:00 (UTC-4)

Montreal Impact (Canada)	1–0	(Nicaragua) Real Estelí
Gjertsen 42'	Report

Stade Saputo, Montreal
Attendance: 13,034
Referee: Dave Peterkin (Jamaica)

27 August 2008
21:00 (UTC-6)

Alajuelense (Costa Rica)	1–1	Puerto Rico Islanders
Fernández 29'	Report	Telesford 63'

Estadio Alejandro Morera Soto, Alajuela
Attendance: 900
Referee: Elmer Bonilla (El Salvador)

27 August 2008
21:00 (UTC-6)

Isidro Metapán (El Salvador)	2–2	(Honduras) Marathón
Aguilar 1'; Reyes 61'	Report	Alvarado 13' (o.g.); Acevedo 50'

Estadio Cuscatlán, San Salvador
Attendance: 1,500
Referee: Edgar Rodríguez (Costa Rica)

28 August 2008
21:00 (UTC-6)

Jalapa (Guatemala)	1–0	(Panama) San Francisco
Castillo 15'	Report

Estadio Las Flores, Jalapa
Attendance: 1,500
Referee: Ricardo Zelaya (Honduras)

29 August 2008
21:00 (UTC-5)

Harbour View (Jamaica)	N/A	(Mexico) Universidad Nacional
	Report

=== Second leg ===
2 September 2008
19:00 (UTC-7)

Chivas USA (United States)	1–1	(Panama) Tauro
Nurse 42'	Report	Moreno 62'

Home Depot Center, Carson
Attendance: 1,821
Referee: Mauricio Navarro (Canada)

2 September 2008
20:00 (UTC-4)

New England Revolution (United States)	0–4	(Trinidad and Tobago) Joe Public
	Report	Richardson 17', 45', 81'; Nelson 48'

Gillette Stadium, Foxborough
Attendance: 4,000
Referee: Steven Depiero (Canada)

2 September 2008
20:00 (UTC-6)

Real Estelí (Nicaragua)	0–0	(Canada) Montreal Impact
	Report

Estadio Carlos Miranda, Comayagua
Attendance: 1,000
Referee: Ricardo Cerdas (Costa Rica)

3 September 2008
21:00 (UTC-4)

Puerto Rico Islanders	2–1	(Costa Rica) Alajuelense
Jagdeosingh 87'; Atieno 89'	Report	Rodríguez 5'

Estadio Juan Ramón Loubriel, Bayamón
Referee: Trevor Taylor (Barbados)

3 September 2008
21:00 (UTC-6)

Hankook Verdes (Belize)	0–6	(Mexico) Cruz Azul
	Report	Orozco 17', 40'; Sabah 37'; Villaluz 51'; Vigneri 70', 85'

Estadio Las Flores, Jalapa
Attendance: 500
Referee: José Guerrero (Nicaragua)

3 September 2008
21:00 (UTC-6)

Marathón (Honduras)	2–1	(El Salvador) Isidro Metapán
García 25'; Mejía 46'	Report	Garcete 9'

Estadio Olímpico Metropolitano, San Pedro Sula
Attendance: 2,529
Referee: Paul Delgadillo (Mexico)

4 September 2008
20:00 (UTC-5)

San Francisco (Panama)	5–0	(Guatemala) Jalapa
Zapata 8', 75'; Pérez 9'; Solís 17', 72'	Report

Estadio Nacional Rod Carew, Panama City
Attendance: 1,000
Referee: Hugo León Guajardo (Mexico)

4 September 2008
21:00 (UTC-5)

Universidad Nacional (Mexico)	3–0	(Jamaica) Harbour View
Palencia 65', 90+2'; Chiapas 88'	Report

Estadio Olímpico Universitario, Mexico City
Attendance: 10,000
Referee: Ricardo Salazar (United States)
