= 2009 CONCACAF Champions League final =

- Event: 2008–09 CONCACAF Champions League
Cruz Azul	Atlante
(Mexico)	(Mexico)
0	2
- on aggregate

First leg
Cruz Azul	Atlante
0	2
- Date: 22 April 2009
- Venue: Estadio Azul, Mexico City
- Referee: Marco A. Rodríguez (Mexico)
- Attendance: 22,718

Second leg
Atlante	Cruz Azul
0	0
- Date: 12 May 2009
- Venue: Estadio Quintana Roo, Cancún
- Referee: Benito Archundia (Mexico)
- Attendance: 13,000

The 2009 CONCACAF Champions League final was a two-legged football match-up to determine the 2008–09 CONCACAF Champions League champions. It was contested by two Mexican clubs, Atlante and Cruz Azul, being the third all-Mexican CONCACAF club championship final in the last four years.

The first leg was held in Estadio Azul of Mexico City, and won by Atlante 2–0. The second leg was held in Estadio Andrés Quintana Roo in Cancún, where both teams tied 0–0. Atlante F.C. won the competition 3–1 on points (2–0 on aggregate), achieving their second CONCACAF Cup trophy.

== Venues ==
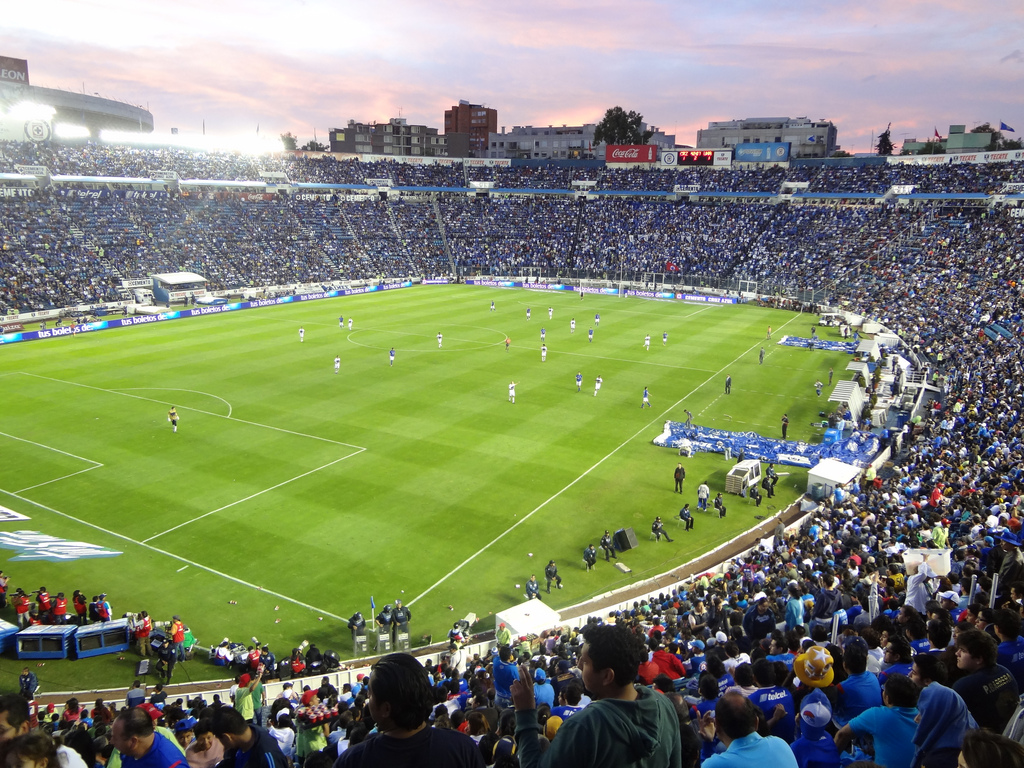
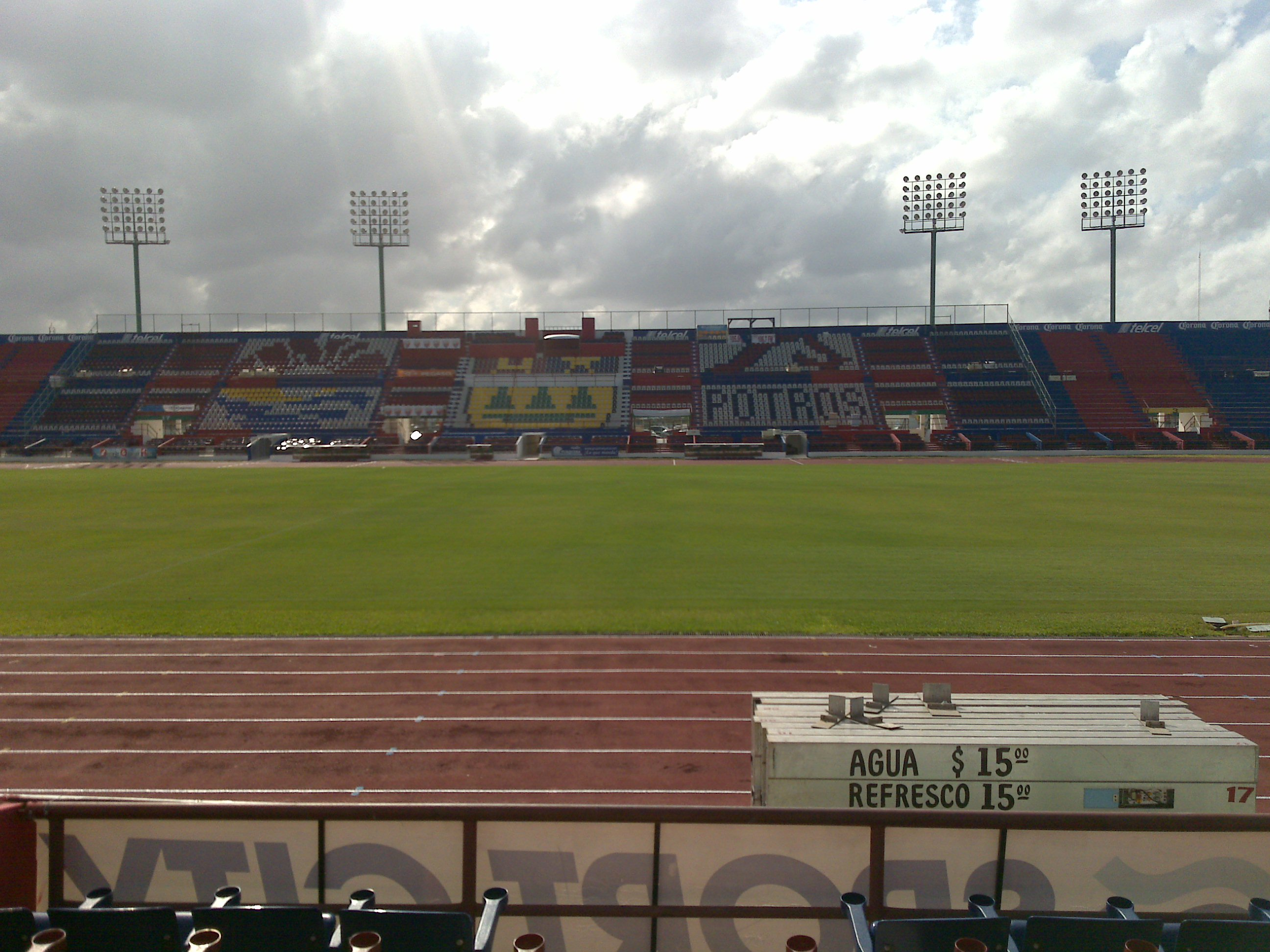
Estadio Azul (left) and Estadio Quintana Roo, venues for the series

== Rules ==
Like other match-ups in the knockout round, the teams played two games, one at each team's home stadium. If the teams remained tied after 90 minutes of play during the 2nd leg, the away goals rule would be used, but not after a tie enters extra time, and so a tie would be decided by penalty shootout if the aggregate score is level after extra time.

== Final summary ==
Fernando Navarro opened the scoring for Atlante in the 17th minute at Estadio Azul in Mexico City, and Christian Bermúdez added the second in the 24th. Rafael Márquez Lugo set up both goals, which came from close-in shots from six meters.

=== First leg ===
2008–09 CONCACAF Champions League final
22 April 2009
21:00 (UTC-6)
First leg

Cruz Azul (Mexico)	0–2	(Mexico) Atlante
		Navarro 17'; Bermúdez 24'

Estadio Azul, Mexico City
Attendance: 22,718
Referee: Marco Antonio Rodríguez (Mexico)

Cruz Azul	Atlante

GK	1	(Mexico) Alfonso Blanco
DF	15	(Bolivia) Ronald Raldes
DF	14	(Mexico) Joaquín Beltrán (c)
DF	8	(Paraguay) Carlos Bonet	(yellow card) 9'
DF	2	(Mexico) Fausto Pinto
MF	5	(Mexico) Gabino Velasco	(yellow card) 61'
MF	10	(Mexico) Edgar Andrade		(substituted off) 19'
MF	18	(Mexico) César Villaluz
FW	19	(Mexico) Alejandro Vela		(substituted off) 53'
FW	26	(Mexico) Luis Ángel Landín
FW	9	(Paraguay) Pablo Zeballos	(yellow card) 12'	(substituted off) 46'
Substitutes:
GK	25	(Mexico) Yosgart Gutiérrez
DF	32	(Mexico) Emilio Hassan
MF	28	(Mexico) Héctor Gutiérrez		(substituted on) 19'
MF	23	(Mexico) Edgar Gerardo Lugo		(substituted on) 46'
FW	27	(Mexico) Javier Orozco		(substituted on) 53'
Manager:
(Mexico) Benjamín Galindo

GK	3	(Argentina) Federico Vilar (c)
DF	6	(Mexico) Gerardo Espinoza
DF	2	(Argentina) Miguel Ángel Martínez	(yellow card) 18'
DF	80	(Mexico) Luis David Velázquez
DF	15	(Mexico) Arturo Muñoz
DF	7	(Mexico) Fernando Navarro Morán
MF	17	(Mexico) José Daniel Guerrero
MF	10	(Argentina) Gabriel Pereyra
MF	18	(Mexico) Christian Bermúdez
FW	8	(Mexico) Rafael Márquez Lugo		(substituted off) 86'
FW	11	(Colombia) Luis Gabriel Rey		(substituted off) 71'
Substitutes:
GK	33	(Mexico) Omar Ortíz
DF	29	(Mexico) José Daniel García
MF	20	(Argentina) Andrés Carevic		(substituted on) 71'
FW	65	(Mexico) Ismael Valadéz		(substituted on) 86'
FW	31	(Mexico) Daniel Arreola
Manager:
(Mexico) José Guadalupe Cruz

Assistant referees:
(Mexico) José Luis Camargo
(Mexico) Alberto Morín
Fourth official:
(Mexico) Roberto García

=== Second leg ===
12 May 2009
22:00 (UTC-5)
Second leg

Atlante (Mexico)	0–0	(Mexico) Cruz Azul
	Report

Estadio Andrés Quintana Roo, Cancún
Attendance: 13,000
Referee: Benito Archundia (Mexico)

Atlante	Cruz Azul

GK	3	(Argentina) Federico Vilar (c)
DF	6	(Mexico) Gerardo Espinoza
DF	4	(Mexico) Luis Gerardo Venegas	(yellow card) 31'
DF	80	(Mexico) Luis David Velázquez
DF	26	(Mexico) Clemente Ovalle	(yellow card) 40'
DF	7	(Mexico) Fernando Navarro		(substituted off) 68'
MF	17	(Mexico) José Daniel Guerrero	(yellow card) 32'
MF	10	(Argentina) Gabriel Pereyra	(yellow card) 38'
MF	18	(Mexico) Christian Bermúdez
FW	11	(Colombia) Luis Gabriel Rey		(substituted off) 74'
FW	8	(Mexico) Rafael Márquez Lugo		(substituted off) 68'
Substitutes:
GK	33	(Mexico) Omar Ortíz
DF	15	(Mexico) Arturo Muñoz		(substituted on) 74'
DF	23	(Mexico) Gerardo Castillo		(substituted on) 68'
MF	20	(Argentina) Andrés Carevic
FW	9	(Venezuela) Giancarlo Maldonado		(substituted on) 68'
Manager:
(Mexico) José Guadalupe Cruz

GK	1	(Mexico) Alfonso Blanco
DF	13	(Mexico) Alejandro Castro
DF	14	(Mexico) Joaquín Beltrán
DF	4	(Mexico) Julio Domínguez
DF	8	(Paraguay) Carlos Bonet		(substituted off) 73'
DF	21	(Mexico) Jaime Lozano
MF	6	(Mexico) Gerardo Torrado (c)	(yellow card) 57'
MF	7	(Paraguay) Christian Riveros	(yellow card) 32'	(substituted off) 56'
FW	19	(Mexico) Alejandro Vela
FW	27	(Mexico) Javier Orozco
FW	9	(Paraguay) Pablo Zeballos	(yellow card) 28'	(substituted off) 62'
Substitutes:
GK	25	(Mexico) Yosgart Gutiérrez
DF	32	(Mexico) Emilio Hassan
MF	18	(Mexico) César Villaluz		(substituted on) 56'
FW	40	(Mexico) Fernando González		(substituted on) 73'
FW	50	(Mexico) Edgar Martíni		(substituted on) 62'
Manager:
(Uruguay) Robert Siboldi

Assistant referees:
(Mexico) Héctor Delgadillo
(Mexico) Marvin Torrentera
Fourth official:
(Mexico) Mauricio Morales
