= Carlos Castrillo =

Guatemalan footballer

Personal information
- Full name: Carlos Mauricio Castrillo Alonzo
- Date of birth: 16 May 1985 (age 41)
- Place of birth: San Manuel Chaparrón, Guatemala
- Height: 1.77 m (5 ft 10 in)
- Position: Right-back

Team information
- Current team: Achuapa
- Number: 16

Senior career*
Years	Team	Apps	(Gls)
2006–2008	Jalapa	65	(0)
2008–2024	Comunicaciones	478	(11)
2024–	Achuapa	14	(0)

International career
2008–2016	Guatemala	32	(0)
- * Club domestic league appearances and goals as of 20:00, 20 January 2025

Carlos Mauricio Castrillo Alonzo (born 16 May 1985) is a Guatemalan professional footballer who plays as a right-back for Liga Guate club Achuapa.

== Club career ==
=== Jalapa ===
Castrillo began his career with Jalapa in 2006, and joined Comunicaciones for the Apertura 2008-09 tournament.

=== Comunicaciones ===
On 27 May 2024, Castrillo confirmed his departure from Comunicaciones.

=== Achuapa ===
On 18 June, Achuapa announced the official signing of Castrillo.

== International career ==
Castrillo made his debut for the full Guatemala national football team in an April 2008 friendly match against Haiti and had made 12 appearances at the start of February 2010, including 4 qualifying matches for the 2010 FIFA World Cup.

== Honours ==
Jalapa

- Liga Guate: 2007 Apertura

Comunicaciones

- Liga Guate: Apertura 2009, Clausura 2011, Apertura 2011, Clausura 2013, Apertura 2013, Clausura 2014, Apertura 2014, 2015 Clausura, 2022 Clausura, 2023 Apertura
- CONCACAF League: 2021
