= 2008–09 CONCACAF Champions League group stage =

The 2008–09 CONCACAF Champions League group stage took place between 16 September 2008 and 26 November 2008. It consisted of 16 clubs arranged into four groups of four with the top-two in each group advancing to the knockout stage.

== Tie-breaking criteria ==
If two teams are tied on points, the following tie-breaking criteria shall be applied, in order, to determine the ranking of teams:

1. Greater number of points earned in matches between the teams concerned
2. Greater goal difference in matches between the teams concerned
3. Greater number of goals scored away from home in matches between the teams concerned
4. Reapply first three criteria if two or more teams are still tied
5. Greater goal difference in all group matches
6. Greater number of goals scored in group matches
7. Greater number of goals scored away in all group matches
8. Drawing of lots

== Groups ==
Key to colours in group tables
Teams that progressed to the knock-out stage

All times local

=== Group A ===
Club	Pld	W	D	L	GF	GA	GD	Pts
(Honduras) Marathón	6	4	1	1	12	5	+7	13
(Mexico) Cruz Azul	6	3	1	2	8	4	+4	10
(Costa Rica) Saprissa	6	3	1	2	7	9	−2	10
(United States) D.C. United	6	0	1	5	4	13	−9	1

- Cruz Azul is ranked ahead of Saprissa based on head-to-head record, which is the first tiebreaker.

16 September 2008
20:00 EDT (UTC-4)

D.C. United (United States)	0–2	(Costa Rica) Saprissa
	(Report)	Centeno 32'; Arrieta 52'

RFK Stadium, Washington, D.C.
Attendance: 6,105
Referee: Marco Rodríguez (Mexico)
17 September 2008
20:00 CST (UTC-6)

Marathón (Honduras)	2–0	(Mexico) Cruz Azul
Mejía 33'; Beata 55'	(Report)

Estadio Olímpico Metropolitano, San Pedro Sula
Attendance: 6,540
Referee: Walter López (Guatemala)

23 September 2008
21:00 CDT (UTC-5)

Cruz Azul (Mexico)	4–0	(Costa Rica) Saprissa
Sabah 23'; Torrado 54'; Zeballos 60'; Riveros 67'	(Report)

Estadio Azul, Mexico City
Attendance: 6,500
Referee: Terry Vaughn (United States)
24 September 2008
20:00 CST (UTC-6)

Marathón (Honduras)	2–0	(United States) D.C. United
Núñez 65'; Norales 82'	(Report)

Estadio Olímpico Metropolitano, San Pedro Sula
Attendance: 8,000
Referee: Wálter Quesada (Costa Rica)

30 September 2008
20:00 CST (UTC-6)

Saprissa (Costa Rica)	2–1	(Honduras) Marathón
Borges 68'; Alpízar 86'	(Report)	Núñez 50' (pen.)

Estadio Ricardo Saprissa, San Juan de Tibás
Attendance: 6,000
Referee: Jair Marrufo (United States)
1 October 2008
20:00 EDT (UTC-4)

D.C. United (United States)	0–1	(Mexico) Cruz Azul
	(Report)	Zeballos 56'

RFK Stadium, Washington, D.C.
Attendance: 7,214
Referee: Paul Ward (Canada)

7 October 2008
19:00 CDT (UTC-5)

Cruz Azul (Mexico)	1–1	(Honduras) Marathón
Orozco 14'	(Report)	Norales 87'

Estadio Azul, Mexico City
Attendance: 4,926
Referee: Carlos Batres (Guatemala)
9 October 2008
20:00 CST (UTC-6)

Saprissa (Costa Rica)	2–2	(United States) D.C. United
Elizondo 82', 86'	(Report)	Doe 6'; Dyachenko 90+2'

Estadio Ricardo Saprissa, San Juan de Tibás
Attendance: 10,000
Referee: German Arredondo (Mexico)

21 October 2008
21:00 CDT (UTC-5)

Cruz Azul (Mexico)	2–0	(United States) D.C. United
Vigneri 36'; Zeballos 88'	(Report)

Estadio Azul, Mexico City
Attendance: 4,265
Referee: Roberto Moreno (Panama)

29 October 2008
20:00 EDT (UTC-4)

D.C. United (United States)	2–4	(Honduras) Marathón
Doe 10'; Janicki 61'	(Report)	Martínez 31'; Berríos 46'; Núñez 53'; Chávez 68'

RFK Stadium, Washington, D.C.
Attendance: 7,156
Referee: Benito Archundia (Mexico)
29 October 2008
18:00 CST (UTC-6)

Saprissa (Costa Rica)	1–0	(Mexico) Cruz Azul
Alpízar 60'	(Report)

Estadio Ricardo Saprissa, San Juan de Tibás
Attendance: 12,800
Referee: Ricardo Salazar (United States)

5 November 2008
19:00 CST (UTC-6)

Marathón (Honduras)	2–0	(Costa Rica) Saprissa
Chávez 11'; Núñez 75'	(Report)

Estadio Olímpico Metropolitano, San Pedro Sula
Attendance: 2,915
Referee: Roberto Moreno (Panama)
- ^1 The Marathón – Saprissa match originally scheduled for 23 October 2008 was rescheduled for 5 November 2008 due to flooding in San Pedro Sula.

=== Group B ===
Club	Pld	W	D	L	GF	GA	GD	Pts
(Mexico) UNAM	6	3	3	0	18	7	+11	12
(United States) Houston Dynamo	6	2	3	1	9	9	0	9
(El Salvador) Luis Ángel Firpo	6	2	2	2	6	8	−2	8
(Panama) San Francisco	6	0	2	4	4	13	−9	2

16 September 2008
21:00 EST (UTC-5)

San Francisco (Panama)	1–1	(Mexico) UNAM
Zapata 42'	(Report)	Espinoza 7'

Estadio Nacional Rod Carew, Panama City
Attendance: 7,000
Referee: Joel Aguilar (El Salvador)

23 September 2008
19:00 EST (UTC-5)

San Francisco (Panama)	0–0	(United States) Houston Dynamo
	(Report)

Estadio Nacional Rod Carew, Panama City
Attendance: 3,400
Referee: Geoffrey Hospedales (Trinidad & Tobago)
24 September 2008
21:00 CDT (UTC-5)

UNAM (Mexico)	3–0	(El Salvador) Luis Ángel Firpo
Cabrera 11', 37'; Pineda 35'	(Report)

Estadio Olímpico Universitario, Mexico City
Attendance: 8,205
Referee: Baldomero Toledo (United States)

30 September 2008
21:00 CDT (UTC-5)

UNAM (Mexico)	4–4	(United States) Houston Dynamo
López 18'; Juárez 26'; Palencia 41'; Verón 45+2'	(Report)	Waibel 3', 50'; Kamara 16', 33' (pen.)

Estadio Olímpico Universitario, Mexico City
Attendance: 9,179
Referee: Wálter Quesada (Costa Rica)
1 October 2008
20:00 CST (UTC-6)

Luis Ángel Firpo (El Salvador)	1–0	(Panama) San Francisco
Ávila 90+1'	(Report)

Estadio Cuscatlán, San Salvador
Attendance: 426
Referee: Marco Rodríguez (Mexico)

7 October 2008
21:00 CDT (UTC-5)

Houston Dynamo (United States)	2–1	(Panama) San Francisco
Wondolowski 13'; De Rosario 88'	(Report)	Pérez 47'

Robertson Stadium, Houston
Attendance: 4,178
Referee: Benito Archundia (Mexico)
9 October 2008
20:00 CST (UTC-6)

Luis Ángel Firpo (El Salvador)	1–1	(Mexico) UNAM
Quintanilla 52'	(Report)	Bravo 55'

Estadio Cuscatlán, San Salvador
Attendance: 1,509
Referee: Ricardo Zelaya (Honduras)

22 October 2008
22:00 CDT (UTC-5)

Houston Dynamo (United States)	1–3	(Mexico) UNAM
Palacios 39' (o.g.)	(Report)	Cacho 18' (pen.); Espinoza 30'; Palacios 70'

Robertson Stadium, Houston
Attendance: 8,741
Referee: Neal Brizan (Trinidad & Tobago)
22 October 2008
19:00 EST (UTC-5)

San Francisco (Panama)	2–3	(El Salvador) Luis Ángel Firpo
Pérez 38'; Jiménez 83'	(Report)	Alas 44'; Sánchez 49'; Gómez 52'

Estadio Nacional Rod Carew, Panama City
Attendance: 300
Referee: Jair Marrufo (United States)

28 October 2008
20:00 CST (UTC-6)

Luis Ángel Firpo (El Salvador)	1–1	(United States) Houston Dynamo
Leguizamón 87'	(Report)	Holden 16'

Estadio Cuscatlán, San Salvador
Attendance: 3,000
Referee: Jorge Gasso (Mexico)
29 October 2008
20:00 CST (UTC-6)

UNAM (Mexico)	6–0	(Panama) San Francisco
Palencia 29', 54'; Bravo 40'; Toledo 49'; Cortés 60'; Santana 73'	(Report)

Estadio Olímpico Universitario, Mexico City
Attendance: 5,982
Referee: Terry Vaughn (United States)

26 November 2008 ^{2}
19:00 CST (UTC-6)

Houston Dynamo (United States)	1–0	(El Salvador) Luis Ángel Firpo
Ching 13'

Robertson Stadium, Houston
Attendance: 14,142
Referee: Roberto García (Mexico)
- ^2 The Houston Dynamo – Luis Ángel Firpo match originally scheduled for 17 September 2008 was rescheduled for 26 November 2008 due to the effects of Hurricane Ike.

=== Group C ===
Club	Pld	W	D	L	GF	GA	GD	Pts
(Mexico) Atlante	6	3	2	1	6	3	+3	11
(Canada) Montreal Impact	6	3	2	1	10	5	+5	11
(Honduras) Olimpia	6	2	2	2	10	6	+4	8
(Trinidad and Tobago) Joe Public	6	1	0	5	3	15	−12	3

- Atlante is ranked ahead of Montreal Impact based on head-to-head record, which is the first tiebreaker.

17 September 2008
20:00 EDT (UTC-4)

Montreal Impact (Canada)	2–0	(Trinidad and Tobago) Joe Public
Pesoli 14'; Donatelli 47'	(Report)

Stade Saputo, Montreal
Attendance: 7,631
Referee: Jair Marrufo (United States)
18 September 2008
21:00 CDT (UTC-5)

Atlante (Mexico)	1–0	(Honduras) Olimpia
A. Muñoz 26'	(Report)

Estadio Andrés Quintana Roo, Cancún
Attendance: 13,000
Referee: Paul Ward (Canada)

24 September 2008
20:00 AST (UTC-4)

Joe Public (Trinidad and Tobago)	1–3	(Honduras) Olimpia
Richardson 77'	(Report)	Bruschi 32', 76'; Thomas 60'

Marvin Lee Stadium, Macoya
Attendance: 847
Referee: Antonius Pinas (Suriname)
24 September 2008
20:00 EDT (UTC-4)

Montreal Impact (Canada)	0–0	(Mexico) Atlante
	(Report)

Stade Saputo, Montreal
Attendance: 12,187
Referee: Courtney Campbell (Jamaica)

1 October 2008
20:00 CST (UTC-6)

Olimpia (Honduras)	1–2	(Canada) Montreal Impact
Turcios 32'	(Report)	Brown 3', 71' (pen.)

Estadio Tiburcio Carías Andino, Tegucigalpa
Attendance: 7,224
Referee: Elmer Bonilla (El Salvador)
2 October 2008
21:00 CDT (UTC-5)

Atlante (Mexico)	0–1	(Trinidad and Tobago) Joe Public
	(Report)	Nelson 56'

Estadio Andrés Quintana Roo, Cancún
Attendance: 13,000
Referee: Carlos Batres (Guatemala)

8 October 2008
20:00 AST (UTC-4)

Joe Public (Trinidad and Tobago)	1–4	(Canada) Montreal Impact
Noray 9'	(Report)	Placentino 5'; Donatelli 13', 79'; Byers 44'

Hasely Crawford Stadium, Port of Spain
Attendance: 2,000
Referee: Enrico Wijngaarde (Suriname)
8 October 2008
20:00 CST (UTC-6)

Olimpia (Honduras)	1–1	(Mexico) Atlante
Hernández 83'	(Report)	Vilar 38'

Estadio Tiburcio Carías Andino, Tegucigalpa
Attendance: 3,200
Referee: Mark Geiger (United States)

21 October 2008
20:00 EDT (UTC-4)

Montreal Impact (Canada)	1–1	(Honduras) Olimpia
Brown 40'	(Report)	Bruschi 45+1'

Stade Saputo, Montreal
Attendance: 8,961
Referee: Benito Archundia (Mexico)
21 October 2008
20:00 AST (UTC-4)

Joe Public (Trinidad and Tobago)	0–2	(Mexico) Atlante
	(Report)	Valadez 7'; Pereyra 56'

Marvin Lee Stadium, Macoya
Attendance: 400
Referee: Baldomero Toledo (United States)

28 October 2008
18:00 CST (UTC-6)

Olimpia (Honduras)	4–0	(Trinidad and Tobago) Joe Public
Dos Santos 26', 38'; García 72'; Silva 85'	(Report)

Estadio Tiburcio Carías Andino, Tegucigalpa
Attendance: 1,000
Referee: Walter López (Guatemala)
28 October 2008
20:00 CST (UTC-6)

Atlante (Mexico)	2–1	(Canada) Montreal Impact
Ovalle 13'; Pereyra 83'	(Report)	Gjertsen 4'

Estadio Andrés Quintana Roo, Cancún
Attendance: 4,312
Referee: Joel Aguilar (El Salvador)

=== Group D ===
Club	Pld	W	D	L	GF	GA	GD	Pts
(Mexico) Santos Laguna	6	3	1	2	14	11	+3	10
Puerto Rico Islanders	6	2	2	2	9	10	−1	8
(Panama) Tauro	6	2	2	2	9	10	−1	8
(Guatemala) Municipal	6	1	3	2	12	13	−1	6

- Puerto Rico Islanders is ranked ahead of Tauro based on head-to-head record, which is the first tiebreaker.

16 September 2008
20:00 AST (UTC-4)

Puerto Rico Islanders	2–1	(Panama) Tauro
Villegas 11'; Jagdeosingh 26'	(Report)	Aguilar 58'

Estadio Juan Ramón Loubriel, Bayamón
Attendance: 3,500
Referee: Benito Archundia (Mexico)
17 September 2008
19:00 CDT (UTC-5)

Santos Laguna (Mexico)	3–2	(Guatemala) Municipal
Torres 10'; Benítez 32'; Vuoso 90'	(Report)	Ramírez 47'; Acevedo 83'

Estadio Corona, Torreón
Attendance: 8,000
Referee: Roberto Moreno (Panama)

23 September 2008
19:00 AST (UTC-4)

Puerto Rico Islanders	3–1	(Mexico) Santos Laguna
Telesford 14'; Delgado 38'; Miranda 49'	(Report)	Herrera 71'

Estadio Juan Ramón Loubriel, Bayamón
Attendance: 10,112
Referee: Mark Geiger (United States)
25 September 2008
20:00 EST (UTC-5)

Tauro (Panama)	2–1	(Guatemala) Municipal
Hay 47', 90+6'	(Report)	Ramírez 45+2'

Estadio Nacional Rod Carew, Panama City
Referee: Neal Brizan (Trinidad & Tobago)

1 October 2008
20:00 CST (UTC-6)

Municipal (Guatemala)	2–2	Puerto Rico Islanders
Leguizamón 79'; Plata 90+1'	(Report)	Noël 9'; Gbandi 90'

Estadio Cementos Progreso, Guatemala City
Attendance: 3,000
Referee: Roberto García (Mexico)
2 October 2008
19:00 EST (UTC-5)

Tauro (Panama)	2–0	(Mexico) Santos Laguna
Hay 42'; Rojas 55'	(Report)

Estadio Nacional Rod Carew, Panama City
Attendance: 1,500
Referee: Baldomero Toledo (United States)

9 October 2008
20:00 CST (UTC-6)

Municipal (Guatemala)	2–2	(Panama) Tauro
Plata 15'; Acevedo 90+1'	(Report)	Escobar 58'; Aguilar 61'

Estadio Mateo Flores, Guatemala City
Attendance: 1,000
Referee: Marco Rodríguez (Mexico)
8 October 2008
19:00 CDT (UTC-5)

Santos Laguna (Mexico)	3–0	Puerto Rico Islanders
Peralta 29'; Hernández 54'; Herrera 70'	(Report)

Estadio Corona, Torreón
Attendance: 12,000
Referee: Joel Aguilar (El Salvador)

22 October 2008
19:00 CDT (UTC-5)

Santos Laguna (Mexico)	3–0	(Panama) Tauro
Benítez 10', 27'; Torres 53'	(Report)

Estadio Corona, Torreón
Attendance: 16,000
Referee: Carlos Batres (Guatemala)
23 October 2008
20:00 AST (UTC-4)

Puerto Rico Islanders	0–1	(Guatemala) Municipal
	(Report)	Acevedo 86'

Estadio Juan Ramón Loubriel, Bayamón
Attendance: 7,500
Referee: Geoffrey Hospedales (Trinidad & Tobago)

29 October 2008
19:00 EST (UTC-5)

Tauro (Panama)	2–2	Puerto Rico Islanders
Hay 42' (pen.), 77'	(Report)	Telesford 16'; Noël 28'

Estadio Nacional Rod Carew, Panama City
Attendance: 1,500
Referee: Germán Arredondo (Mexico)
30 October 2008
20:00 CST (UTC-6)

Municipal (Guatemala)	4–4	(Mexico) Santos Laguna
Ramírez 38' (pen.), 64' (pen.), 90+5'; Leguizamón 71'	(Report)	Herrera 10', 47' (pen.), 57' (pen.); Peralta 74'

Estadio Mateo Flores, Guatemala City
Attendance: 1,764
Referee: Wálter Quesada (Costa Rica)
