= Andony Hernández =

Mexican footballer (born 1981)

Personal information
- Full name: Miguel Andony Hernández Rodríguez
- Date of birth: June 20, 1981 (age 45)
- Place of birth: Guadalajara, Jalisco, Mexico
- Height: 1.74 m (5 ft 9 in)
- Position: Midfielder

Team information
- Current team: Santos Laguna
- Number: 18

Senior career*
Years	Team	Apps	(Gls)
1999–2006	Tecos UAG	151	(7)
2007–2008	Veracruz	2	(0)
2008–2010	Santos Laguna	1	(0)
- * Club domestic league appearances and goals as of March 3, 2009

Miguel Andony Hernández Rodríguez (born June 20, 1981) is a midfielder. He currently plays for Santos Laguna in the Primera División de México.

He began his career in 1999 as a member of Tecos UAG, debuting on April 10, 1999, in a 2–1 loss to Tigres UANL. Hernández became a fixture in the Tecos midfield, recording almost 9,000 minutes played between 1999 and 2007. He was sent to Veracruz, and only played in two games. He was traded to Santos in 2008, and has seen significant playing time in the CONCACAF Champions League, playing in 6 games and scoring 1 goal against the Puerto Rico Islanders.
