= Omar Ortiz =

Mexican footballer (born 1976)

Personal information
- Full name: Omar Ortiz Uribe
- Date of birth: 13 March 1976 (age 50)
- Place of birth: Monterrey, Nuevo León, Mexico
- Height: 1.80 m (5 ft 11 in)
- Position: Goalkeeper

Senior career*
Years	Team	Apps	(Gls)
1997–2001	Monterrey	30	(0)
2001–2003	Atlético Celaya	32	(0)
2002	→ Monterrey (loan)	17	(0)
2003	→ Necaxa (loan)	7	(0)
2003–2007	Chiapas	162	(0)
2008–2009	Necaxa	38	(0)
2009	Atlante	0	(0)
2009–2010	Monterrey		
Total		286	(0)

International career
2002	Mexico	1	(0)
- * Club domestic league appearances and goals

Omar Ortiz Uribe (born 13 March 1976) is a Mexican former professional footballer and convicted kidnapper. He played as a goalkeeper, making his debut in 1997 with Monterrey.

== Career ==
He spent several successful seasons at Atletico Celaya and Jaguares de Chiapas. During his time at Celaya, he earned one cap for Mexico, which came against Guatemala during the 2002 CONCACAF Gold Cup. Ortiz made his Atlante debut on February 25, 2009, during a CONCACAF Champions League semi-final against Houston Dynamo of Major League Soccer. In May 2010, he was banned from football for two years for twice testing positive for the banned steroids oxymetholone and masteron.

Ortiz is popularly known for his nickname El Gato (English: The Cat) for his "feline face" and green eyes.

== Arrest and conviction ==
On January 6, 2012, rumors began to spread of him being kidnapped, but it was later confirmed that the Mexican authorities had arrested him outside his home in Monterrey after two kidnapping suspects were detained and confessed his involvement in the kidnappings. After a couple of days, Ortiz's family members decided to report on his disappearance, but the authorities first refused to comment on the incident. Upon his arrest, Ortiz was charged for working with a gang responsible for at least 20 kidnappings, among them the abduction of Gloria Trevi's husband in 2011. The 35-year-old Ortiz admitted to have picked out two rich people for the kidnapping ring, since his job was to select wealthy families from his same social circle. The gang allegedly demanded around 1 million pesos ($59,500 US dollars [Nov. 2015]) for the release of each victim. He later confessed that the kidnapping ring was working for the infamous criminal organization known as the Gulf Cartel.

Reports from the government of Nuevo León mentioned that Ortiz had an addiction to cocaine. In fact, La Jornada newspaper mentions that Ortiz became part of the kidnapping ring due to his drug addiction. Ortiz also confessed to have experienced "financial problems" after he was banned for playing professional football for two years after consuming illegal substances. George W. Grayson, a drug war analyst and expert of Mexican politics, said that Ortiz's arrest shows the "possible ubiquity of organized crime [in Mexico]."

He was sent to a prison in Cadereyta, Nuevo León. He was found guilty of at least three kidnappings and was sentenced to 75 years in prison on 8 January 2019.
