= Luis Escobar (footballer) =

Colombian footballer (born 1984)

Personal information
- Full name: Luis Fernando Escobar
- Date of birth: 19 March 1984 (age 42)
- Place of birth: Barranquilla, Colombia
- Height: 1.74 m (5 ft 8 1/2 in)
- Position: Striker

Senior career*
Years	Team	Apps	(Gls)
2002–2004	Academia	45	(16)
2004–2005	Once Caldas	20	(4)
2005–2006	Atlético La Sabana	37	(10)
2006–2007	Cortuluá	40	(14)
2008–2009	Tauro	58	(24)
2010	Atlético Chiriquí	12	(1)
2010–present	Sporting San Miguelito	0	(0)
- * Club domestic league appearances and goals as of 18 June 2007 ‡ National team caps and goals as of 18 June 2007

Luis Fernando Escobar (born 19 March 1984) is a football striker who most recently played for Liga Panameña de Fútbol team Sporting San Miguelito.

== Club career ==
Escobar participated in the CONCACAF Champions League 2008-09 with FC Tauro and scored 1 goal in 8 games.
