= 2007–08 Liga Nacional de Guatemala =

55th professional season of the top-flight football league in Guatemala

Liga Nacional de Guatemala
- Season: 2007–08
- Dates: 28 July 2007 – 25 May 2008
- Champions: Apertura: Jalapa (1st title); Clausura: Municipal (26th title)
- Relegated: Malacateco
- CONCACAF Champions League: Jalapa; Municipal
- Top goalscorer: Apertura: Adrián Apellaniz (10); Clausura: Carlos González (10); Season: Carlos Castillo (16)

The 2007–08 Liga Nacional de Guatemala was the 55th professional season of the top-flight football league in Guatemala. The season was divided into two championships—the 2007 Apertura and the 2008 Clausura—each in an identical format and each contested by the same 12 teams.

== Promotion and relegation ==
Mictlán was relegated at the end of the 2006–07 season and was replaced by Malacateco who was promoted from the Primera División.

== Participating clubs ==
Club	City	Department	Stadium	Capacity
Comunicaciones	Guatemala City	Guatemala	Mateo Flores	30.000
Municipal	Guatemala City	Guatemala	Mateo Flores	30.000
Heredia	San José	Petén	Del Monte	8.000
Jalapa	Jalapa	Jalapa	Las Flores	10.000
Malacateco	Malacatán	San Marcos	Santa Lucía	7.000
Marquense	San Marcos	San Marcos	Marquesa de la Ensenada	10.000
Petapa	San Miguel Petapa	Guatemala	Municipal de San Miguel Petapa	5.000
Suchitepéquez	Mazatenango	Suchitepéquez	Carlos Salazar Hijo	10.000
Xelajú	Quetzaltenango	Quetzaltenango	Mario Camposeco	11.000
Zacapa	Zacapa	Zacapa	David Ordoñez Bardales	10.000

== Final standings ==
Pos	Team	Pld	W	D	L	GF	GA	GD	Pts
1	Municipal	18	8	7	3	31	18	+13	31
2	Jalapa	18	7	7	4	32	26	+6	28
3	Comunicaciones	18	7	6	5	27	18	+9	27
4	Xelajú	18	7	4	7	14	22	−8	25
5	Suchitepéquez	18	6	6	6	32	27	+5	24
6	Zacapa	18	6	6	6	31	31	0	24
7	Marquense	18	6	6	6	21	27	−6	24
8	Malacateco	18	6	2	10	16	22	−6	20
9	Heredia	18	5	4	9	22	26	−4	19
10	Petapa	18	3	10	5	20	29	−9	19

== Top scorers ==
Pos	Player	Team	Goals
1	(Uruguay) Adrián Apellaniz	Jalapa	14
2	(Guatemala) Selvin Motta	Zacapa	12
3	(Brazil) Jorge Dos Santos	Jalapa	10
4	(Guatemala) Tránsito Montepeque	Comunicaciones	8
5	(Guatemala) Guillermo Ramírez	Municipal	7
5	(Guatemala) Mario Rodríguez	Municipal	7

Final Update: December 26, 2007
Source:Prensa Libre

== Results ==
Home \ Away	COM	HER	JAL	MAL	MAR	MUN	PET	SUC	XEL	ZAC
Comunicaciones		3–2	1–0	2–1	1–1	1–1	5–0	2–0	1–0	3–3
Heredia	1–0		3–4	3–0	2–0	0–0	2–2	1–1	3–1	2–1
Jalapa	2–1	3–0		2–0	3–1	0–0	2–2	2–2	2–1	1–1
Malacateco	1–0	1–0	1–1		1–1	1–2	0–1	2–1	3–0	2–1
Marquense	1–0	1–1	1–1	2–0		1–0	2–1	2–1	1–1	1–0
Municipal	1–0	2–0	2–4	1–0	6–1		0–0	3–3	5–0	3–3
Petapa	1–4	1–0	0–0	2–1	2–2	2–2		1–1	1–1	1–1
Suchitepéquez	2–2	2–1	3–1	1–2	2–1	1–2	2–0		2–0	7–1
Xelajú	0–0	1–0	2–1	1–0	2–1	1–0	2–1	0–0		1–0
Zacapa	1–1	3–1	5–3	1–0	3–1	0–1	2–2	4–1	1–0	

Legend: Blue = home team win; Yellow = draw; Red = away team win.

=== Playoffs ===
Quarterfinals
4	Xelajú	1	1	2
5	Suchitepéquez	3	0	3
3	Comunicaciones (p)	1	1 (3)	5
6	Zacapa	1	1 (0)	2

Semifinals
1	Municipal	0	1	1
5	Suchitepéquez	1	1	2
2	Jalapa	0	2	2
3	Comunicaciones	1	0	1

Final
5	Suchitepéquez	1	0	1
2	Jalapa (a)	1	0	1

=== Apertura Tournament Champion ===
Jalapa as tournament champion qualified to the 2008–09 CONCACAF Champions League.

Apertura 2007 winner

1st National title

=== Relegation ===
There is no relegation after the Apertura.
