= 2007–08 Primera División (Costa Rica) =

Campeonato Scotiabank
- Season: 2007–08
- Champions: -
- Relegated: -
- -: -

In both the Invierno (winter) and Verano (summer) of the 2007–08 season, there are 2 groups of 6 teams. They will play twice (home and away) with the teams of their own group (10 games). They will also play once with the teams of the other group (6 games), for a total of 16 games. The 3 top teams of each group qualify for the playoffs. The winners of group A and B get a bye week, while the 2nd of group A plays the 3rd of group B and the 2nd of group B plays the 3rd of group A. The winners of these series move to the semi-final series.

The home field advantage in the playoffs is given to the team with the best record in the group stage.

The winner of the playoff series played between the Invierno and Verano champion will gain entry into the group stage of the 2008–09 CONCACAF Champions League. The playoff runner-up will gain entry into the 2008-09 CONCACAF Champions League preliminary round. If the same team wins both the Invierno and Verano tournaments then the preliminary round spot will be awarded to the team with the next best regular season record in the Verano tournament.

== Invierno 2007 ==
=== Group stage ===
Group A
Pos	Team	Pld	W	D	L	GF	GA	GD	Pts	Qualification
1	Herediano	16	7	7	2	23	12	+11	28	Qualified to the semifinals
2	LD Alajuelense	16	7	7	2	23	14	+9	28	Qualified to the quarterfinals
3	AD Carmelita	16	6	6	4	21	20	+1	24	Qualified to the quarterfinals
4	Puntarenas F.C.	16	5	7	4	19	20	−1	22	
5	AD San Carlos	16	6	3	7	21	23	−2	21	
6	Universidad de Costa Rica	15	3	4	8	19	26	−7	13	

Group B
Pos	Team	Pld	W	D	L	GF	GA	GD	Pts	Qualification
1	Saprissa	16	9	2	5	22	16	+6	29	Qualified to the semifinals
2	Brujas F.C.	16	6	6	4	26	24	+2	24	Qualified to the quarterfinals
3	Municipal Pérez Zeledón	16	6	2	8	29	26	+3	20	Qualified to the quarterfinals
4	Municipal Liberia	16	4	5	7	20	24	−4	17	
5	Santos de Guápiles	16	4	5	7	18	24	−6	17	
6	C.S. Cartaginés	16	4	4	8	18	30	−12	16	

=== Playoffs ===
Quarterfinals
1
8
2B	Brujas F.C.	0	2	2
3A	Carmelita	1	0	1
3
6
2A	Alajuelense	2	3	5
3B	Pérez Zeledón	1	0	1

Semifinals
1A	Herediano	0	1	1
2B	Brujas FC	0	0	0
1B	Saprissa	1	1	2
2A	Alajuelense	0	1	1

Finals
Herediano	0	2	2
Saprissa	2	2	4

Invierno 2007 winners
Saprissa

== Verano 2008 ==
=== Group stage ===
Group A
Pos	Team	Pld	W	D	L	GF	GA	GD	Pts
1	Deportivo Saprissa	16	9	3	4	27	20	+7	30
2	Club Sport Herediano	16	5	8	3	20	13	+7	23
3	Universidad de Costa Rica	16	6	4	6	23	22	+1	22
4	Puntarenas FC	16	5	7	4	15	19	−4	22
5	Asociacion Deportiva San Carlos	16	5	4	7	16	17	−1	19
6	Asociación Deportiva Carmelita	16	4	3	9	17	29	−12	15

Group B
Pos	Team	Pld	W	D	L	GF	GA	GD	Pts
1	Liga Deportiva Alajuelense	16	8	6	2	22	13	+9	30
2	Brujas F.C.	16	6	4	6	23	23	0	22
3	A.D. Municipal Perez Zeledon	16	5	7	4	14	14	0	22
4	Municipal Liberia	16	5	6	5	22	20	+2	21
5	Club Sport Cartaginés	16	4	5	7	14	19	−5	17
6	Santos de Guápiles F.C.	16	3	5	8	16	20	−4	14

Note: Saprissa and Alajuelense switched groups at the end of Apertura 2007.

=== Playoffs ===
Quarterfinals
1
8
2B	Brujas FC	3	1	4
3A	UCR	2	0	2
3
6
2A	Herediano	1	1	2
3B	Pérez Zeledón	1	2	3

Semifinals
1A	Saprissa	5	1	6
2B	Brujas FC	0	2	2
1B	Alajuelense	0	5	5
3B	Pérez Zeledón	0	3	3

Finals
1A	Saprissa	1	1	2
1B	Alajuelense	0	0	0

Verano 2008 winners
Saprissa

== Aggregate table ==
Pos	Team	Pld	W	D	L	GF	GA	GD	Pts	Qualification or relegation
1	Saprissa	32	18	5	9	49	36	+13	59	Primera División Champion 2007–08
2	Alajuelense	32	15	13	4	45	27	+18	58	
3	Herediano	32	12	15	5	43	25	+18	51	
4	Brujas F.C.	32	12	10	10	49	47	+2	46	
5	Puntarenas F.C.	32	10	14	8	34	39	−5	44	
6	Pérez Zeledón	32	11	9	12	43	40	+3	42	
7	San Carlos	32	11	7	14	37	40	−3	40	
8	Carmelita	32	10	9	13	38	49	−11	39	
9	Liberia	32	9	11	12	42	44	−2	38	
10	Universidad	32	9	8	15	42	48	−6	35	
11	Cartaginés	32	8	9	15	32	49	−17	33	
12	Santos	32	7	10	15	34	44	−10	31	Relegated to Segunda Division

- Saprissa earned CRC1 spot in 2008–09 CONCACAF Champions League.
- Alajuelense earned CRC2 spot in 2008–09 CONCACAF Champions League.
