= Luis Velásquez (footballer) =

Mexican footballer (born 1984)

Luis Velázquez
Personal information
- Full name: Luis David Velázquez Jiménez
- Date of birth: 29 December 1984 (age 41)
- Place of birth: Veracruz, Mexico
- Height: 1.81 m (5 ft 11 in)
- Position: Defender

Youth career
- 2004–2005: Pioneros de Ciudad Obregón

Senior career*
Years	Team	Apps	(Gls)
2005	Dorados	7	(0)
2005–2009	León	110	(0)
2009	Potros Neza	2	(0)
2009–2012	Atlante	29	(0)
2012	Altamira	11	(0)
- * Club domestic league appearances and goals

Luis David Velázquez Jiménez (Note: In this Spanish name, the first or paternal surname is Velázquez and the second or maternal family name is Jiménez.) (born 29 December 1984) is a Mexican former footballer who played as a defender.

Velázquez began his career in 2004 at Pioneros de Ciudad Obregón. That same year, he signed with Dorados de Sinaloa. After Dorados relegated to Primera División A, he went to Club León. After playing there for many seasons, Velázquez returned to Primera División with Atlante F.C.
