= James Thorpe (soccer) =

American soccer player

Personal information
- Full name: James Thorpe
- Date of birth: February 17, 1985 (age 41)
- Place of birth: East Longmeadow, Massachusetts, United States
- Height: 5 ft 11 in (1.80 m)
- Position: Goalkeeper

College career
| Years | Team | Apps | (Gls) |
| 2004–2007 | Franklin Pierce Ravens | | |

Senior career*
| Years | Team | Apps | (Gls) |
| 2006 | Boulder Rapids Reserve | 10 | (0) |
| 2007 | Cape Cod Crusaders | 13 | (0) |
| 2008 | D.C. United | 0 | (0) |
| 2009 | Western Mass Pioneers | 10 | (0) |

Managerial career
- 2010–2011: Evansville Purple Aces (women's asst.)
- 2012–2014: Holy Cross Crusaders (men's & women's asst.)
- 2015: Rhode Island Rams (men's asst.)
- 2016–2018: Boston College Eagles (women's asst.)
- 2019–2020: Rhode Island Rams (women's associate HC)
- 2021–: UMass Lowell River Hawks (women's asst.)
- * Club domestic league appearances and goals as of 11 October 2009

James Thorpe (born February 17, 1985, in East Longmeadow, Massachusetts) is an American soccer player.

== Career ==
=== College ===
Thorpe played college soccer at Franklin Pierce College, where he was named Conference Goalkeeper of the Year and as Freshman of the Year in 2004, was awarded NSCAA/adidas All-American Third Team honors, was named to the NSCAA/adidas All-New England and All-Northeast-10 first team as a sophomore and a junior, and was also NE-10 Goalkeeper of the Year three years in a row. He also led Franklin Pierce to its first-ever NCAA Division II National Championship in his senior year in 2007.

=== Professional ===
Thorpe was signed to a developmental contract by D.C. United on March 27, 2008, but did not see any first team action in league play. His lone first team appearance came in United's 2–0 loss to Cruz Azul in the CONCACAF Champions League, in which he received two yellow cards and was sent off. He also played in seven games for DC in the MLS Reserve Division before being released at the end of the season.

He subsequently signed for Western Mass Pioneers in the USL Second Division for the 2009 season.

== Honors ==
D.C. United

- U.S. Open Cup: 2008
