= Osei Telesford =

Trinidadian footballer

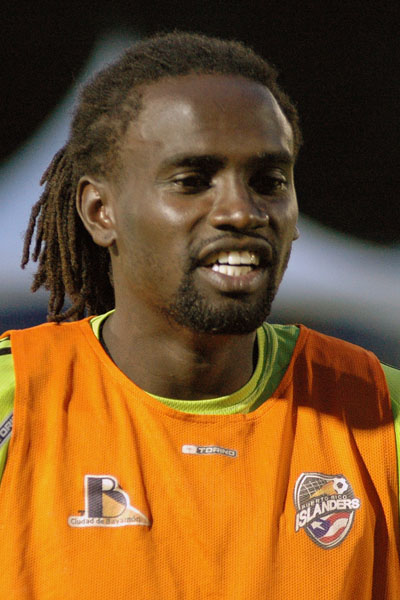

Personal information
- Date of birth: November 30, 1983 (age 42)
- Place of birth: San Juan, Trinidad and Tobago
- Height: 5 ft 11 in (1.80 m)
- Position: Midfielder

Team information
- Current team: Criollos de Caguas FC
- Number: 21

Youth career
- Joe Public

College career
Years	Team	Apps	(Gls)
2002–2006	Liberty Flames		

Senior career*
Years	Team	Apps	(Gls)
2005–2006	Carolina Dynamo	23	(1)
2007	Chicago Fire	2	(0)
2008–2012	Puerto Rico Islanders	70	(1)
2013–2015	Criollos de Caguas	40	(8)

International career^{‡}
2007–2011	Trinidad and Tobago	21	(1)
- * Club domestic league appearances and goals as of October 19, 2024 ‡ National team caps and goals as of October 19, 2024

Osei Telesford (born November 30, 1983) is a Trinidadian retired footballer.

== Career ==
=== Youth and college ===
Born in San Juan, Telesford was a member of the youth setup at famed Trinidadian club Joe Public, before coming to the United States in 2003. He played college soccer at Liberty University, starting 65 of 66 matches from 2003 to 2006, scoring 8 goals and assisting on 8 more. He was named to the All Big South Conference Team in each of his four years with the team.

During his college years he also played for Carolina Dynamo of the USL Premier Development League. He was PDL Defender of the Year in 2006, and was a PDL First Team selection for helping Dynamo to a league-best 14–0–2 regular season record

=== Professional ===
Telesford was drafted in the 2nd round (21st overall) by Chicago Fire in the 2007 MLS Supplemental Draft, but played 2 Major League Soccer games for the team before being released at the end of the year.

He signed with the Puerto Rico Islanders in the USL First Division in early 2008, and helped the Islanders win the 2008 USL First Division regular season title and progressed to the semi-finals of the CONCACAF Champions League 2008–09.

Telesford played for the Criollos de Caguas FC in the Liga Puerto Rico from 2013 until his retirement in 2015.

=== International ===
Telesford earned his first cap for the Trinidad and Tobago national football team in January 2007 during the Caribbean Digicel Cup. He was previously a regular fixture on the U-23 and U-20 levels.

== Honors ==
Puerto Rico Islanders

- USSF Division 2 Pro League: 2010
- Commissioner's Cup: 2008
- CFU Club Championship: 2010
