= Néstor Silva =

Uruguayan footballer (born 1982)

Personal information
- Full name: Néstor Fabián Silva
- Date of birth: 17 January 1982 (age 44)
- Place of birth: Tacuarembó, Uruguay
- Height: 1.75 m (5 ft 9 in)
- Position: Forward

Senior career*
Years	Team	Apps	(Gls)
2001–2005	Tacuarembó		
2005	Paysandú		
2006–2007	Progreso		
2007	Millonarios		
2008	→ Liverpool (loan)		
2008	Olimpia		
2009–2010	Racing	23	(7)
2010	Liverpool	10	(2)
2011	Anagennisi Karditsa	10	(3)
2011–2012	Danubio	15	(2)
2012–2013	Racing	21	(2)
2013–2014	Juventud	20	(4)
2014–2016	Tacuarembó	23	(3)
- * Club domestic league appearances and goals as of 17:42, 16 December 2019 (UTC)

Néstor Fabián Silva (born January 17, 1982, in Tacuarembó) is a Uruguayan football forward.

== Titles ==
Season	Club	Title
2006	CA Progreso	Segunda División Uruguay
