= Gonzalo Peralta =

Argentine footballer

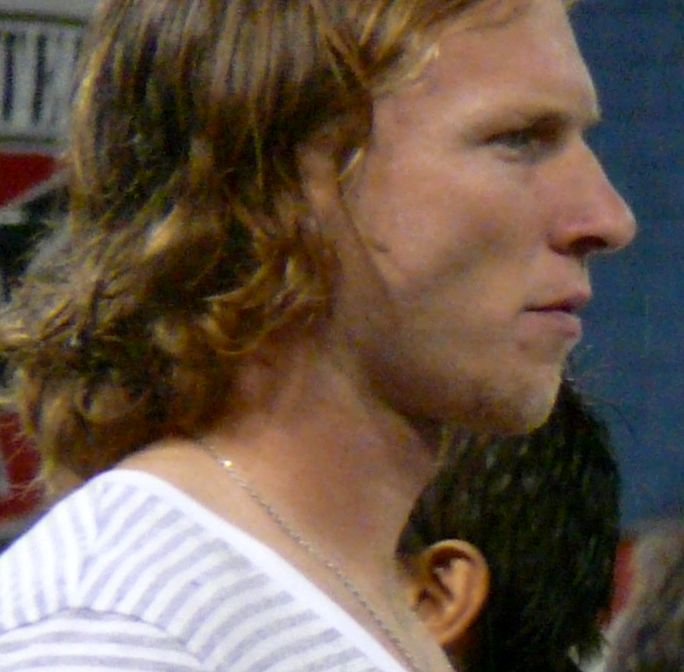

Personal information
- Full name: Gonzalo Peralta
- Date of birth: 17 September 1980
- Place of birth: Munro, Argentina
- Date of death: 7 October 2016 (aged 36)
- Place of death: Buenos Aires, Argentina
- Height: 6 ft 2 in (1.88 m)
- Position: Defender

Senior career*
Years	Team	Apps	(Gls)
2002–2003	Comunicaciones	37	(4)
2004–2007	Almirante Brown	90	(7)
2008–2009	D.C. United	18	(1)
2009	→ Unión Santa Fe (loan)	8	(0)
2009–2010	Tristán Suárez	?	(6)
2011–2012	Barracas Central	?	(8)
2012–2014	Platense	62	(3)
2014–2016	Deportivo Riestra	11	(2)
- * Club domestic league appearances and goals as of 10 May 2015

Gonzalo Peralta (17 September 1980 – 7 October 2016) was an Argentine footballer who at the time of his death played defender for Deportivo Riestra.

== Club career ==
Before arriving at Almirante Brown, Peralta played two years at Club Comunicaciones in the Argentine lower divisions, appearing a total of 37 times and scoring four goals.

Peralta was a key member of the Almirante Brown defense since his arrival at the club during the 2004–05 season. In 2007 the central defender helped Almirante Brown obtain the championship of the Primera B Clausura tournament. More recently, Peralta served as team captain and in four years at the club appeared in 90 games, scoring 7 goals.

D.C. United opted not to pick up the option on Peralta's contract after the 2008 MLS season and was immediately loaned out to Argentinian side Unión de Santa Fe for the 2009 season.

Peralta died on 6 October 2016 at the age of 36.
