= José Daniel García =

Mexican footballer (born 1986)

Personal information
- Full name: José Daniel García Rodríguez
- Date of birth: 27 January 1986 (age 40)
- Place of birth: Sahuayo, Michoacán, Mexico
- Height: 1.76 m (5 ft 9 in)
- Position: Defender

Senior career*
Years	Team	Apps	(Gls)
2006–2007	Pegaso Real de Colima	23	(0)
2007–2010	Atlante	6	(0)
2008	→ Potros Chetumal (loan)	10	(0)
2011	Mérida	1	(0)

Managerial career
- 2015–2017: Sahuayo (Assistant)
- 2017–2018: Sahuayo
- 2018–2019: Sahuayo (Assistant)
- 2019: Sahuayo (Interim)
- * Club domestic league appearances and goals as of March 5, 2009

José Daniel García Rodríguez (born January 27, 1986) is a former Mexican football defender. He last played for the Atlante F.C. in the Primera División de México.

== Club career ==
García debuted with Atlante on March 9, 2008, during a 3–2 loss to Cruz Azul. He won himself a spot in the first team, thanks to his great playing at Atlante's former filial team, Pegaso Real de Colima.

He began his career as a professional player Piedad 3rd division, played in Querétaro, Celaya 2nd Division, 2nd Division Palmero of Colima, the 1st A Colts Chetumal, Atlante UTN the 1st A. the 1st A Mérida
