= Las Flores Stadium =

Stadium in Jalapa, Guatemala

Coordinates: 14°38′24″N 89°59′09″W

Estadio Las Flores is a football stadium located in Jalapa, Guatemala. It was home to first division club Deportivo Jalapa (Los Tigres); its capacity is 15,000.
