= CD Jalapa =

Association football club in Guatemala

Jalapa
- Full name: Club Deportivo Jalapa Fútbol Club
- Nicknames: Los Tigres del Jumay (The Jumay's Tigers); Los Remicheros
- Founded: 17 July 1978; 48 years ago
- Dissolved: 6 July 2011; 15 years ago
- Ground: Estadio Las Flores
- Capacity: 15,000
- Chairman: (Guatemala) Edmundo Ruano
- Manager: (Colombia) Franklin Cetre
- League: Liga Nacional de Fútbol
Home colours	Away colours

Club Deportivo Jalapa Fútbol Club was a Guatemalan professional football club that played in the Liga Nacional, the top level division in the country. They were based in Jalapa, and their home stadium was the Estadio Las Flores.

== History ==
The team was founded on July 10, 1978. First promotion to the Liga Mayor A in 1981, played there until 1991 when lost their category descending to Liga Mayor B. Having been promoted to the Liga Nacional in 2001 under coach Benjamín Monterroso, Jalapa won the domestic cup three times, in 2002, 2005, and 2006.

The club's biggest achievement has been winning the 2007 Apertura tournament, which was the first national championship won in the club's history. The title earned them a berth in the CONCACAF Champions League 2008-09.

Jalapa won their second league championship by defeating Guatemalan great C.S.D. Municipal in the Claus 2009 final. This was their second championship in two years.

== 2010's ==
After Jalapa become champions, they entered into an economic situation resulting in the departure of most of the players, they were relegated to the Liga de Ascenso Nacional. Things did not change for them, they had more economic issues which resulted in their relegation to the Segunda Division and continue being relegated until the team folded.

== 2012 ==
A new team plays in the same stadium Las Flores called Los Tigres de Jumay which won the Tercera Division and promoted to Segunda Division.

== Honours ==
- Liga Nacional de Guatemala
  - Champions (2): Apertura 2007, Clausura 2009
- Copa de Guatemala
  - Winners (3): 2002, 2005, 2006

== List of football coaches ==
- (Chile) Jaime Ormazabal (1981)
- (Chile) Efrain II Santander (1988)
- (Guatemala) Jaime Batres (1990-1991)
- (Guatemala) Óscar Enrique Sánchez
- (Guatemala) Juan Alberto Salguero
- (Guatemala) Benjamín Monterroso (2000–01)
- (Uruguay) Julio César Cortés (2005)
- (Uruguay) Carlos Jurado (2006–08)
- (Argentina) Hector Trujillo (2009)
- (Uruguay) Ariel Longo (2009–10)
