= Rod Carew National Stadium =

Stadium in Panama

Coordinates: 9°2′28.72″N 79°32′43.08″W

Estadio Nacional Rod Carew
- El Coloso de Cerro Patacón "The Colossus of Cerro Patacón"
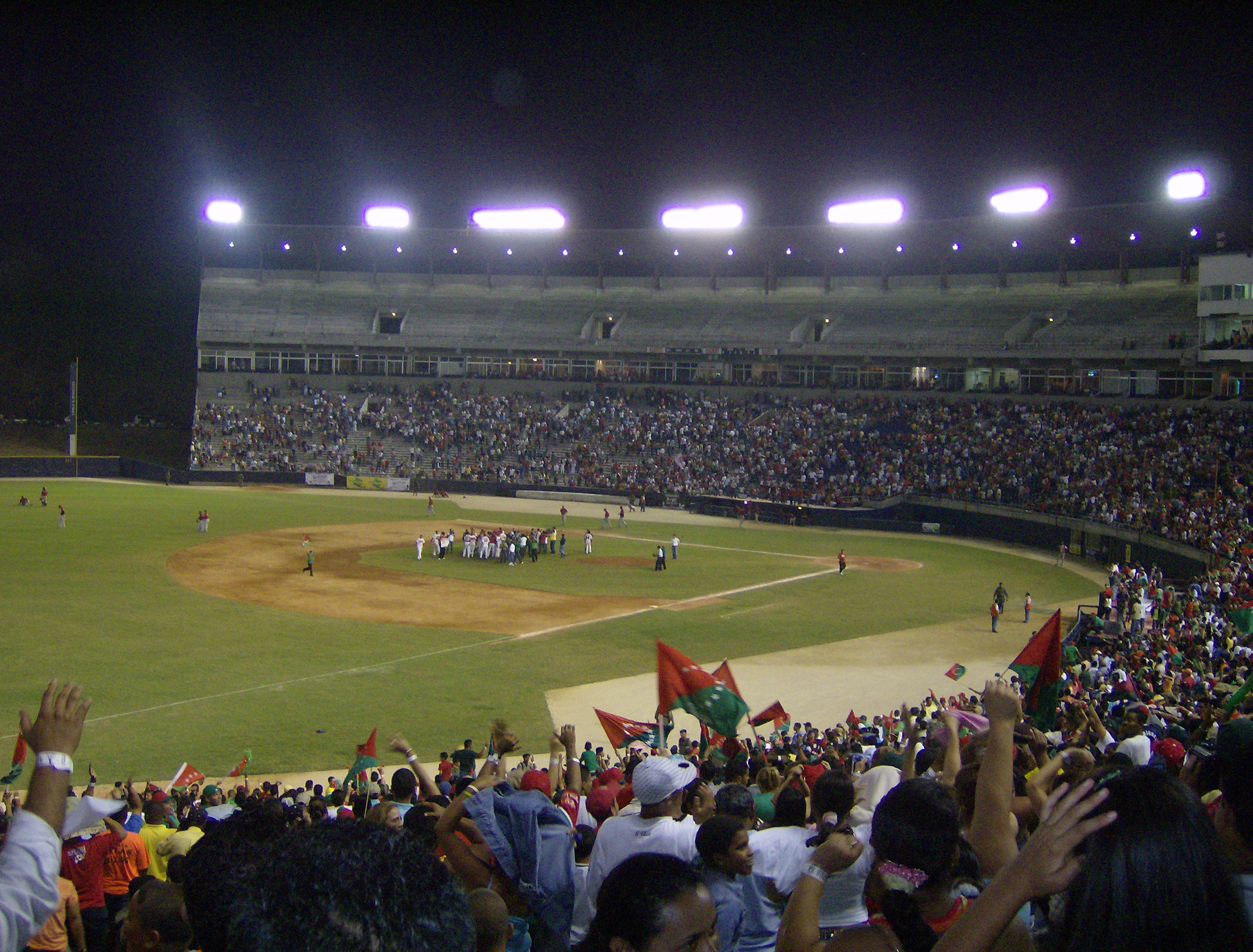
- Interactive map of Estadio Nacional Rod Carew
- Full name: Estadio Nacional Rodney Carew
- Former names: Estadio Nacional
- Location: Panama City, Panama; Panama
- Owner: Patronato del Estadio Nacional
- Capacity: 27,000
- Surface: Natural Grass
- Field size: Left Field - 321 feet (98 m); Center Field - 400 feet (122 m); Right Field - 321 feet (98 m)

Construction
- Opened: October 10, 1999
- Cost: 25 million USD
- Architect: Carla Di Bello Robles

Tenants
- Panama national baseball team (1999–present); Panama national rugby union team (selected matches); Panama national football team (selected matches)

Rod Carew National Stadium (Spanish: Estadio Nacional Rod Carew) is a multi-purpose stadium in Panama City, Panama. The stadium has a capacity of 27,000 and was built in 1999.

It is currently used mostly for baseball matches from the national league, and Panama national baseball team matches.

It has also hosted many international baseball competitions as well as many concerts and different types of events.

In 2012, Qualifiers were held at the stadium for the 2013 World Baseball Classic, featuring the national baseball teams of Panama, Brazil, Colombia, and Nicaragua

The stadium is named after Rod Carew, a Hall-of-Fame Panamanian-American baseball player.

Since 2003, there have been many plans and talks of expanding the stadium's capacity to nearly 45,000.

Some of the artists that have performed in the Estadio Nacional de Panama include Backstreet Boys, Christina Aguilera, Sting, Enrique Iglesias, Soda Stereo, and Ruben Blades.

The New York Yankees and Miami Marlins scheduled two spring training exhibition games at the ballpark on March 15 and March 16, 2014.

The 2019 Caribbean Series was played at the stadium, coinciding with Panama's first appearance in the tournament since 1960.
