= 2008–09 CONCACAF Champions League =

44th edition of premier club football tournament organized by CONCACAF

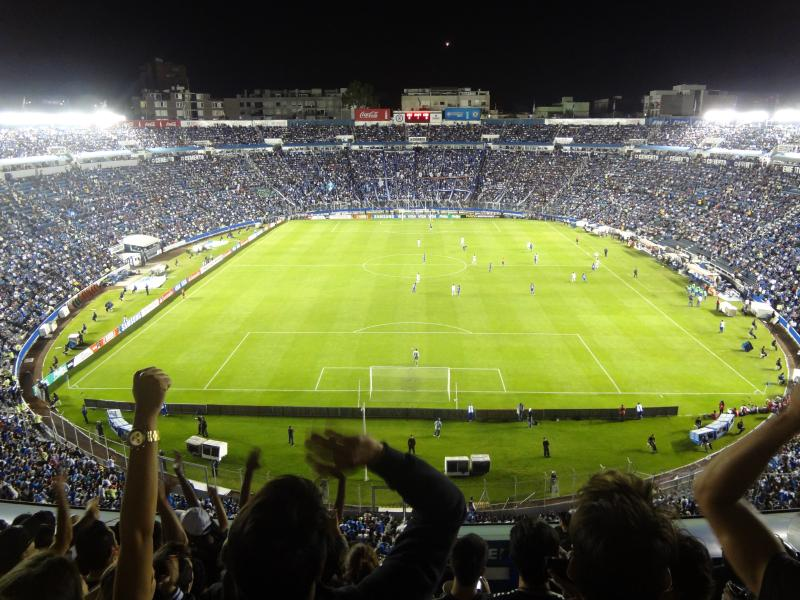
- Estadio Azul in Mexico City hosted the second leg Final

Tournament details
- Dates: August 26, 2008 – April 30, 2009
- Teams: 24 (from 13 associations)

Final positions
- Champions: (Mexico) Atlante (2nd title)
- Runners-up: (Mexico) Cruz Azul

Tournament statistics
- Matches played: 77
- Goals scored: 223 (2.9 per match)
- Attendance: 539,397 (7,005 per match)
- Top scorer(s): (Mexico) Javier Orozco (7 goals)

The 2008–09 CONCACAF Champions League was the 44th edition of the premier association football club competition organized by CONCACAF, the regional governing body of North America, Central America, and the Caribbean. This was the first iteration of the competition to be known as CONCACAF Champions League, having been previously known as the CONCACAF Champions' Cup.

The championship began on August 26, 2008, and it concluded on May 12, 2009. Atlante of Mexico won the championship after defeating Cruz Azul, also from Mexico in the final. As champions, they represented CONCACAF in the 2009 FIFA Club World Cup.

== Qualification ==
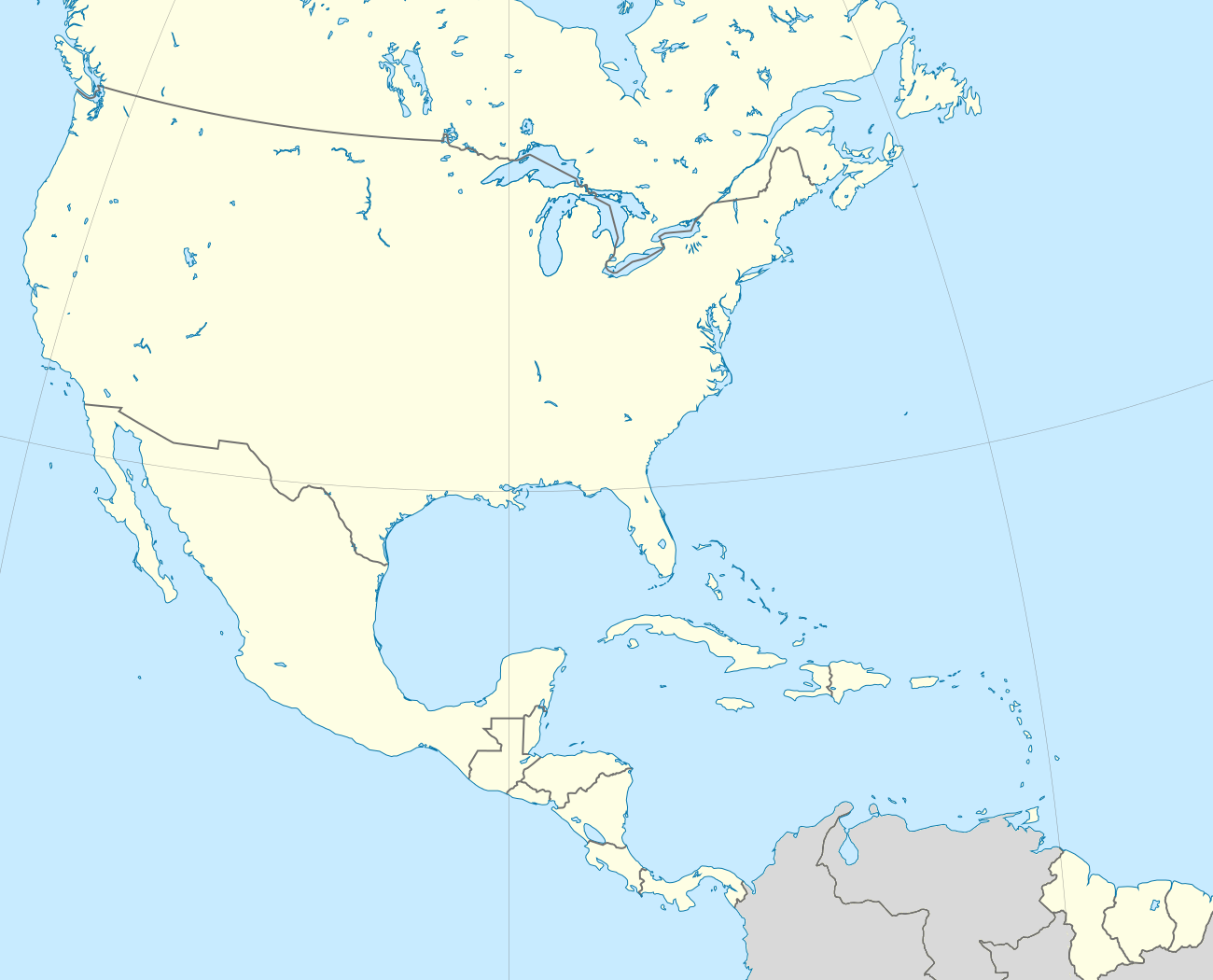
Location of teams of the 2008–09 CONCACAF Champions League
Brown: Group A; Red: Group B; Orange: Group C; Yellow: Group D.

24 teams from 13 nations participated in the 2008–09 CONCACAF Champions League from the North American, Central American, and Caribbean zones. Nine of the teams came from North America, twelve from Central America, and three from the Caribbean. Below is the qualification scheme for the 2008-09 competition:

Teams in bold qualify directly for the group stage.

Association	Club	Qualifying method
North America (9 teams)
(Mexico) Mexico; 4 berths	**Atlante**	2007 Apertura winners
(Mexico) Mexico; 4 berths	**Santos Laguna**	2008 Clausura winners
(Mexico) Mexico; 4 berths	U.N.A.M	2007 Apertura runners-up
(Mexico) Mexico; 4 berths	Cruz Azul	2008 Clausura runners-up
(United States) United States; 4 berths	**Houston Dynamo**	2007 MLS Cup winners
(United States) United States; 4 berths	**D.C. United**	2007 MLS Supporters' Shield winners
(United States) United States; 4 berths	New England Revolution	2007 U.S. Open Cup winners and 2007 MLS Cup runners-up
(United States) United States; 4 berths	Chivas USA	2007 MLS Supporters' Shield runners-up^{1}
(Canada) Canada; 1 berth	Montreal Impact	2008 Canadian Championship winners
Central America (12 teams)
(Costa Rica) Costa Rica; 2 berths	**Saprissa**	2007 Invierno and 2008 Verano winners
(Costa Rica) Costa Rica; 2 berths	Alajuelense	2008 Verano runners-up^{2}
(Honduras) Honduras; 2 berths	Marathón	2007 Apertura winners
(Honduras) Honduras; 2 berths	**Olimpia**	2008 Clausura winners
(Guatemala) Guatemala; 2 berths	Jalapa	2007 Apertura winners
(Guatemala) Guatemala; 2 berths	**Municipal**	2008 Clausura winners
(El Salvador) El Salvador; 2 berths	**Luis Ángel Firpo**	2007 Apertura and 2008 Clausura winners
(El Salvador) El Salvador; 2 berths	Isidro Metapán	2008 Clausura runners-up^{3}
(Panama) Panama; 2 berths	San Francisco	2007 Clausura and 2008 Apertura winner
(Panama) Panama; 2 berths	Tauro	2008 Apertura runners-up^{4}
(Belize) Belize; 1 berth	Hankook Verdes	2007–08 Belize Premier Football League winners
(Nicaragua) Nicaragua; 1 berth	Real Estelí	2007 Apertura and 2008 Clausura winners
Caribbean (3 teams)
Jamaica	Harbour View	2007 CFU Club Championship winners
Trinidad and Tobago	Joe Public	2007 CFU Club Championship runners-up
Puerto Rico	Puerto Rico Islanders	2007 CFU Club Championship third place

^{1} New England was both the 2007 U.S. Open Cup winners and the 2007 MLS Cup runners-up, so Chivas USA claimed USA4 as the 2007 MLS Supporters' Shield runners-up.

^{2} Saprissa was both the 2007 Invierno and 2008 Verano winners, so Alajuelense has claimed CRC2 as the 2008 Verano runners-up.

^{3} Luis Ángel Firpo was both the 2007 Apertura and 2008 Clausura winners, so Isidro Metapán has claimed SLV2 as the 2008 Clausura runners-up.

^{4} San Francisco was both the 2007 Clausura and 2008 Apertura winners, so Tauro has claimed PAN2 as the 2008 Apertura runners-up.

== Format ==
There was a two-legged preliminary round for 16 clubs, with the eight winners advancing to the group stage. They were joined by the other eight teams who were seeded directly into the group stage. The clubs involved in the group stage were placed into four groups of four with each team playing the others in its group in both home and away matches. The top two teams from each group will advance to the knockout rounds, which will consist of two-legged ties. The final round, to be held in late April 2009, was also two-legged. Also, unlike the previously contested CONCACAF Champions' Cup, the away goals rule is used in the CONCACAF Champions League, but does not apply after a tie goes into extra time.

Group Stage
Pot A	(Mexico) Atlante	(Mexico) Santos Laguna	(United States) Houston Dynamo	(United States) D.C. United
Pot B	(Costa Rica) Saprissa	(Honduras) Olimpia	(Guatemala) Municipal	(El Salvador) Luis Ángel Firpo
Preliminary round
Pot A	(Mexico) Universidad Nacional	(Mexico) Cruz Azul	(United States) New England Revolution	(United States) Chivas USA
Pot A	(Costa Rica) Alajuelense	(Honduras) Marathón	(Panama) San Francisco	(Canada) Montreal Impact
Pot B	(Guatemala) Jalapa	(El Salvador) Isidro Metapán	(Panama) Tauro	(Belize) Hankook Verdes
Pot B	(Nicaragua) Real Estelí	(Jamaica) Harbour View	(Trinidad and Tobago) Joe Public	Puerto Rico Islanders

== Schedule ==
Round		Draw date	First leg	Second leg
Preliminary round	Preliminary	June 11, 2008 (New York, US)	August 26–29, 2008	September 2–4, 2008
Group Stage	Matchday 1	June 11, 2008 (New York, US)	September 16–18, 2008	
Group Stage	Matchday 2	June 11, 2008 (New York, US)	September 23–25, 2008	
Group Stage	Matchday 3	June 11, 2008 (New York, US)	September 30–October 2, 2008	
Group Stage	Matchday 4	June 11, 2008 (New York, US)	October 7–9, 2008	
Group Stage	Matchday 5	June 11, 2008 (New York, US)	October 21–23, 2008	
Group Stage	Matchday 6	June 11, 2008 (New York, US)	October 28–30, 2008	
Championship round	Quarterfinals	December 10, 2008	February 24–26, 2009	March 3–5, 2009
Championship round	Semifinals	December 10, 2008	March 17–18, 2009	April 7–8, 2009
Championship round	Final	December 10, 2008	April 22, 2009	May 12, 2009

== Preliminary round ==
The draw for the preliminary round was held on 11 June 2008 in New York City. The first legs of the preliminary round were played 26–28 August 2008, while the second legs were played 2–4 September 2008.

Team 1	Agg.	Team 2	1st leg	2nd leg
Jalapa (Guatemala)	1–5	(Panama) San Francisco	1–0	0–5
Joe Public (Trinidad and Tobago)	6–1	(United States) New England Revolution	2–1	4–0
Alajuelense (Costa Rica)	2–3	Puerto Rico Islanders	1–1	1–2
Cruz Azul (Mexico)	12–0	(Belize) Hankook Verdes	6–0	6–0
Harbour View (Jamaica)	0–3	(Mexico) UNAM	N/A	0–3
Tauro (Panama)	3–1	(United States) Chivas USA	2–0	1–1
Montreal Impact (Canada)	1–0	(Nicaragua) Real Estelí	1–0	0–0
Isidro Metapán (El Salvador)	3–4	(Honduras) Marathón	2–2	1–2

The effects of Hurricane Gustav led to the cancellation of the first leg of the Harbour View - UNAM tie, and as a result the tie was contested as a single match.

== Group stage ==
The Group Stage draw was held on 11 June 2008 in New York City and was unveiled on 16 June 2008. Winners and runners-up of each group advance to the quarterfinals.

=== Group A ===
Club	Pld	W	D	L	GF	GA	GD	Pts
(Honduras) Marathón	6	4	1	1	12	5	+7	13
(Mexico) Cruz Azul	6	3	1	2	8	4	+4	10
(Costa Rica) Saprissa	6	3	1	2	7	9	−2	10
(United States) D.C. United	6	0	1	5	4	13	−9	1

	DCU	SAP	CRU	MAR
D.C. United	–	0–2	0–1	2–4
Saprissa	2–2	–	1–0	2–1
Cruz Azul	2–0	4–0	–	1–1
Marathón	2–0	2–0	2–0	–

- Cruz Azul were ranked ahead of Saprissa based on head-to-head record, which is the first tiebreaker.

=== Group B ===
Club	Pld	W	D	L	GF	GA	GD	Pts
(Mexico) UNAM	6	3	3	0	18	7	+11	12
(United States) Houston Dynamo	6	2	3	1	9	9	0	9
(El Salvador) Luis Ángel Firpo	6	2	2	2	6	8	−2	8
(Panama) San Francisco	6	0	2	4	4	13	−9	2

	HOU	LAF	SFR	UNAM
Houston Dynamo	–	1–0	2–1	1–3
Luis Ángel Firpo	1–1	–	1–0	1–1
San Francisco	0–0	2–3	–	1–1
UNAM	4–4	3–0	6–0	–

=== Group C ===
Club	Pld	W	D	L	GF	GA	GD	Pts
(Mexico) Atlante	6	3	2	1	6	3	+3	11
(Canada) Montreal Impact	6	3	2	1	10	5	+5	11
(Honduras) Olimpia	6	2	2	2	10	6	+4	8
(Trinidad and Tobago) Joe Public	6	1	0	5	3	15	−12	3

	ATL	OLI	JOE	MON
Atlante	–	1–0	0–1	2–1
Olimpia	1–1	–	4–0	1–2
Joe Public	0–2	1–3	–	1–4
Montreal Impact	0–0	1–1	2–0	–

- Atlante were ranked ahead of Montreal Impact based on head-to-head record, which is the first tiebreaker.

=== Group D ===
Club	Pld	W	D	L	GF	GA	GD	Pts
(Mexico) Santos Laguna	6	3	1	2	14	11	+3	10
Puerto Rico Islanders	6	2	2	2	9	10	−1	8
(Panama) Tauro	6	2	2	2	9	10	−1	8
(Guatemala) Municipal	6	1	3	2	12	13	−1	6

	SAN	MUN	PRI	TAU
Santos Laguna	–	3–2	3–0	3–0
Municipal	4–4	–	2–2	2–2
Puerto Rico Islanders	3–1	0–1	–	2–1
Tauro	2–0	2–1	2–2	–

- Puerto Rico Islanders were ranked ahead of Tauro based on head-to-head record, which is the first tiebreaker.

== Championship round ==
The draw for the championship round was held on 10 December 2008. In each round, teams will play their opponent once at home and once away. The four group winners from the group stage will play the second leg at home in the quarterfinals. The order of the home and away matches for the semifinals and Finals were determined at the draw.

In all rounds, if two teams are tied after both legs then two 15-minute halves of extra time are played. If the two teams are still tied on total goals after extra time, a penalty shootout determines the winner.

=== Bracket ===
Quarterfinals
Puerto Rico Islanders	2	1	3
(Honduras) Marathón	1	0	1
(Mexico) Cruz Azul	1	1	2
(Mexico) UNAM	0	0	0
(Canada) Montreal Impact	2	2	4
(Mexico) Santos Laguna	0	5	5
(United States) Houston Dynamo	1	0	1
(Mexico) Atlante	1	3	4

Semifinals
Puerto Rico Islanders	2	1	3 (2)
(Mexico) Cruz Azul (p)	0	3	3 (4)
(Mexico) Santos Laguna	2	1	3
(Mexico) Atlante	1	3	4

Finals
(Mexico) Cruz Azul	0	0	0
(Mexico) Atlante	2	0	2

=== Quarterfinals ===
The first legs of the quarterfinals were played from 24 February 2009 to 26 February 2009, while the second legs were played from 3 March 2009 to 5 March 2009.

Team 1	Agg.	Team 2	1st leg	2nd leg
Houston Dynamo (United States)	1–4	(Mexico) Atlante	1–1	0–3
Montreal Impact (Canada)	4–5	(Mexico) Santos Laguna	2–0	2–5
Puerto Rico Islanders	3–1	(Honduras) Marathón	2–1	1–0
Cruz Azul (Mexico)	2–0	(Mexico) UNAM	1–0	1–0

=== Semifinals ===
The first legs of the semifinals were played on 17 March and 18 March 2009, while the second legs were played on 7 April and 8 April 2009.

Team 1	Agg.	Team 2	1st leg	2nd leg
Puerto Rico Islanders	3–3 (2–4 p)	(Mexico) Cruz Azul	2–0	1–3 (aet)
Santos Laguna (Mexico)	3–4	(Mexico) Atlante	2–1	1–3

=== Final ===
The two-legged Final was played on 22 April and 12 May 2009. The second leg was originally scheduled for 29 April, but was postponed until 12 May by CONCACAF due to concerns over an outbreak of Swine Flu in Mexico.

Team 1	Agg.	Team 2	1st leg	2nd leg
Cruz Azul (Mexico)	0–2	(Mexico) Atlante	0–2	0–0

CONCACAF Champions League
2008–09 champions

Atlante
Second title

== Top goalscorers ==
Rank	Name	Club	Goals
1	(Mexico) Javier Orozco	(Mexico) Cruz Azul	7
2	(Mexico) Agustín Enrique Herrera	(Mexico) Santos Laguna	5
2	(Mexico) Francisco Palencia	(Mexico) UNAM	5
2	(Guatemala) Guillermo Ramírez	(Guatemala) Municipal	5
2	(Guyana) Gregory Richardson	(Trinidad and Tobago) Joe Public	5
6	(Panama) Brunet Hay	(Panama) Tauro	4
6	(Panama) Edwin Aguilar	(Panama) Tauro	4
6	(Ecuador) Christian Benítez	(Mexico) Santos Laguna	4
6	(Panama) Roberto Brown	(Canada) Montreal Impact	4
6	(Honduras) Milton Núñez	(Honduras) Marathón	4
6	(Colombia) Carlos Quintero	(Mexico) Santos Laguna	4
6	(Mexico) Vicente Matías Vuoso	(Mexico) Santos Laguna	4
6	(Paraguay) Pablo Zeballos	(Mexico) Cruz Azul	4
