= 2010–11 C.F. Pachuca season =

The 2010–11 Pachuca season was the 64th professional season of Mexico's top-flight football league. The season is split into two tournaments—the Torneo Apertura and the Torneo Clausura—each with identical formats and each contested by the same eighteen teams. Pachuca began their season on July 24, 2010 against América, Pachuca played their homes games on Saturdays at 7pm local time.

== Torneo Apertura ==
=== Squad ===
Note: Flags indicate national team as defined under FIFA eligibility rules; some limited exceptions apply. Players may hold more than one non-FIFA nationality.

No.	Pos.	Nation	Player
1	GK	COL	Miguel Calero (Captain)
2	DF	MEX	Leobardo López
4	DF	MEX	Marco Iván Pérez
6	MF	USA	Marco Vidal
7	MF	MEX	Edy Germán Brambila
9	FW	USA	Herculez Gomez
10	FW	PAR	Édgar Benítez
11	MF	MEX	Braulio Luna
12	MF	MEX	Juan Carlos Rojas
13	FW	MEX	Víctor Mañon
14	FW	MEX	Daniel Arreola

No.	Pos.	Nation	Player
15	MF	MEX	Luis Montes
16	MF	MEX	Carlos Gerardo Rodríguez
18	MF	USA	José Francisco Torres
19	FW	ARG	Darío Cvitanich
21	MF	ARG	Damián Manso
22	DF	MEX	Paul Aguilar
23	GK	MEX	Carlos Velázquez
24	MF	MEX	Raúl Martínez
25	FW	COL	Franco Arizala
26	DF	ARG	Javier Muñoz
30	GK	MEX	Rodolfo Cota

=== Regular season ===
July 24, 2010 Round 1	Pachuca	3 – 0	América	Estadio Hidalgo, Pachuca
7:00pm	Martínez 14' (o.g.); Benítez 42' (pen.), 55'	Report		Referee: Miguel Ángel Ortega

August 1, 2010 Round 2	Toluca	1 – 1	Pachuca	Estadio Nemesio Díez, Toluca
12:00pm	Novaretti 88'	Report	Rodríguez 56'	Referee: Jorge Macías Romo

August 7, 2010 Round 3	Pachuca	0 – 3	Santos Laguna	Estadio Hidalgo, Pachuca
7:00pm		Report	Quintero 23'; Benítez 57', 82'	Referee: Roberto García

August 14, 2010 Round 4	Cruz Azul	4 – 1	Pachuca	Estadio Azul, Mexico City
5:00pm	Orozco 7', 50'; Villa 41'; Martínez 60' (o.g.)	Report	Benítez 65' (pen.)	Referee: Armando Archundia

August 21, 2010 Round 5	Pachuca	2 – 2	Monterrey	Estadio Hidalgo, Pachuca
7:00pm	Cvitanich 7'; Arreola 90+1'	Report	Suazo 68' de Nigris 78'	Referee: Ricardo Arellano

August 29, 2010 Round 6	Puebla	3 – 1	Pachuca	Estadio Cuauhtémoc, Puebla
12:00pm	Pereyra 65'; Juárez 85'; Acosta 89'	Report	Manso 64'	Referee: José Alfredo Peñaloza

September 11, 2010 Round 7	Pachuca	1 – 1	Guadalajara	Estadio Hidalgo, Pachuca
7:00pm	Arizala 57'		Araujo 40'	Referee: Miguel Ángel Chacón

September 18, 2010 Round 8	San Luis	1 – 0	Pachuca	Estadio Alfonso Lastras, San Luis Potosí
7:00pm	Arce 9'	Report		Referee: Marco Antonio Rodríguez

September 25, 2010 Round 9	Pachuca	3 – 1	Estudiantes Tecos	Estadio Hidalgo, Pachuca
7:00pm	Benítez 44' (pen.); Cvitanich 60'; Gomez 83'	Report	Cejas 85'	Referee: Jaime Herrera

October 2, 2010 Round 10	Atlante	1 – 3	Pachuca	Estadio Andrés Quintana Roo, Cancún
9:00pm	Fano 18'	Report	Benítez 46', 58'; Cvitanich 90'	Referee: Armando Archundia

October 9, 2010 Round 11	Pachuca	3 – 2	UNAM	Estadio Hidalgo, Pachuca
7:00pm	López 32'; Cvitanich 46'; Mañon 55'	Report	López 11'; Cacho 90+1'	Referee: Jorge Eduardo Gasso

October 16, 2010 Round 12	Pachuca	1 – 1	Morelia	Estadio Hidalgo, Pachuca
7:00pm	Peña 11'	Report	Sabah 59'	Referee: Francisco Chacón

October 23, 2010 Round 13	Chiapas	2 – 0	Pachuca	Estadio Victor Manuel Reyna, Tuxtla Gutierrez
5:00pm	Rodríguez 34'; Martínez 74'	Report		Referee: Fernando Guerrero

October 26, 2010 Round 14	Pachuca	2 – 3	UANL	Estadio Hidalgo, Pachuca
8:00pm	Cvitanich 45', 57' (pen.)	Report	Acuña 62'; Lobos 76' (pen.); Álvarez 79'	Referee: Marco Antonio Rodríguez

October 30, 2010 Round 15	Atlas	1 – 2	Pachuca	Estadio Jalisco, Guadalajara
8:45pm	Moreno 28'	Report	Manso 31'; Cvitanich 73'	Referee: Roberto García

November 6, 2010 Round 16	Pachuca	2 – 1	Querétaro	Estadio Hidalgo, Pachuca
7:00pm	Cvitanich 9'; Cárdenas 60' (o.g.)	Report	Romero 20'	Referee: Miguel Ángel Flores

November 12, 2010 Round 17	Necaxa	1 – 2	Pachuca	Estadio Victoria, Aguascalientes
8:00pm	Cervantes 33'	Report	López 7'; Manso 15'	Referee: Rafael Medina

=== Final phase ===
November 18, 2010 Quarterfinals	Pachuca	1 – 1	Monterrey	Estadio Hidalgo, Pachuca
6:00pm	Azrizala 77'	Report	Basanta 56'	Referee: Paul Delgadillo

November 21, 2010 Quarterfinals	Monterrey	3 – 3	Pachuca	Estadio Tecnológico, Monterrey
4:00pm	Suazo 19' de Nigris 36'; Cardozo 56'	Report	Azrizala 25', 84', 89'	Referee: Armando Archundia

Monterrey advanced due to being the higher seed in the classification phase

== Transfers ==
=== In ===
#	Pos	Player	From	Fee	Date	Notes

=== Out ===
Pos	Player	To	Fee	Date	Notes

=== Goalscorers ===
Position	Nation	Name	Goals scored
1.	(Argentina)	Darío Cvitanich	8
2.	(Paraguay)	Édgar Benítez	6
3.	(Colombia)	Franco Arizala	5
4.	(Argentina)	Damián Manso	3
4.	(Mexico)	Leobardo López	2
4.		Own Goal	2
5.	(Mexico)	Daniel Arreola	1
5.	(United States)	Herculez Gomez	1
5.	(Mexico)	Víctor Mañon	1
5.	(Mexico)	Carlos Alberto Peña	1
5.	(Mexico)	Carlos Gerardo Rodríguez	1
TOTAL			31

=== Regular season statistics ===
==== Results summary ====
Overall								Home						Away					
Pld	W	D	L	GF	GA	GD	Pts	W	D	L	GF	GA	GD	W	D	L	GF	GA	GD
17	7	5	5	27	28	−1	26	4	3	1	15	11	+4	3	2	4	12	17	−5

Last updated: 15 January 2011.
Source: Apertura 2010 results

==== Results by round ====
Round	1	2	3	4	5	6	7	8	9	10	11	12	13	14	15	16	17
Ground	H	A	H	A	H	A	H	A	H	A	H	H	A	H	A	H	A
Result	W	D	L	L	D	L	D	L	W	W	W	D	L	L	W	W	W
Position	3	4	10	13	12	14	16	17	15	12	9	10	12	13	9	8	7

Updated to match(es) played on 15 January 2011. Source: Apertura 2010 results and mediotiempo.com
A = Away; H = Home; W = Win; D = Draw; L = Loss

== Torneo Clausura ==
=== Squad ===
Note: Flags indicate national team as defined under FIFA eligibility rules; some limited exceptions apply. Players may hold more than one non-FIFA nationality.

No.	Pos.	Nation	Player
1	GK	COL	Miguel Calero (Captain)
2	DF	MEX	Leobardo López
3	DF	MEX	Javier Santillán
4	DF	MEX	Marco Pérez
5	MF	COL	Yulián Anchico
6	MF	MEX	Hector Hernández
7	MF	MEX	Fernando Leonel Cortés
9	FW	USA	Herculez Gomez
10	FW	PAR	Édgar Benítez
11	MF	MEX	Braulio Luna
12	MF	MEX	Juan Carlos Rojas
13	FW	MEX	Víctor Mañon

No.	Pos.	Nation	Player
15	MF	MEX	Luis Montes
16	MF	MEX	Carlos Gerardo Rodríguez
18	MF	USA	José Francisco Torres
22	MF	MEX	Paul Aguilar
24	MF	MEX	Raúl Martínez
25	FW	COL	Franco Arizala
26	DF	ARG	Javier Muñoz
27	MF	MEX	Carlos Peña
28	DF	MEX	Héctor Herrera
29	MF	ARG	Facundo Coria (on loan from Villarreal B)
30	GK	MEX	Rodolfo Cota
31	GK	MEX	Carlos Fernández Demeneghi

=== Regular season ===
January 9, 2011 Round 1	América	0 – 2	Pachuca	Estadio Azteca, Mexico City
4:00pm		Report	Anchico 24'; Benítez 66'	Referee: José Alfredo Peñaloza

January 15, 2011 Round 2	Pachuca	0 – 0	Toluca	Estadio Hidalgo, Pachuca
7:00pm		Report		Referee: Mauricio Morales

January 22, 2011 Round 3	Santos Laguna	1 – 1	Pachuca	Estadio Corona, Torreón
7:00pm	Ludueña 43'	Report	Benítez 44'	Referee: Marco Antonio Rodríguez

January 29, 2011 Round 4	Pachuca	0 – 4	Cruz Azul	Estadio Hidalgo, Pachuca
7:00pm		Report	Drougett 40'; Domímguez 61'; Castro 74'; Villaluz 87'	Referee: Ricardo Arellano

February 5, 2011 Round 5	Monterrey	2 – 0	Pachuca	Estadio Tecnológico, Monterrey
5:00pm	de Nigris 26'; Cardozo 49'	Report		Referee: Erim Ramírez

February 12, 2011 Round 6	Pachuca	1 – 0	Puebla	Estadio Hidalgo, Pachuca
7:00pm	Aguilar 69'	Report		Referee: Jaime Herrera

February 19, 2011 Round 7	Guadalajara	4 – 1	Pachuca	Estadio Omnilife, Zapopan
7:00pm	Mora 1'; Medina 12', 59'; Torres 34'	Report	Benítez 47'	Referee: Miguel Ángel Ayala

February 26, 2011 Round 8	Pachuca	0 – 0	San Luis	Estadio Hidalgo, Pachuca
7:00pm		Report		Referee: Fabricio Morales

March 4, 2011 Round 9	Estudiantes Tecos	1 – 0	Pachuca	Estadio Tres de Marzo, Zapopan
8:10pm	Cejas 69' (pen.)	Report		Referee: José Alfredo Peñaloza

March 12, 2011 Round 10	Pachuca	0 – 4	Atlante	Estadio Hidalgo, Pachuca
7:00pm		Report	Fonseca 20', 41'; Navarro 22'; Bermúdez 27'	Referee: Mauricio Morales

March 20, 2011 Round 11	UNAM	0 – 0	Pachuca	Estadio Olímpico Universitario, Mexico City
12:00pm		Report		Referee: Miguel Ángel Flores

April 3, 2011 Round 12	Morelia	1 – 3	Pachuca	Estadio Morelos, Morelia
12:00pm	Aldrete 83'	Report	Benítez 9'; Arizala 45'; Luna 90+1'	Referee: Jorge Gasso

April 9, 2011 Round 13	Pachuca	3 – 0	Chiapas	Estadio Hidalgo, Pachuca
7:00pm	Gómez 71', 78'; Arizala 80'	Report		Referee: Marco Antonio Rodríguez

April 16, 2011 Round 14	UANL	4 – 2	Pachuca	Estadio Universitario, San Nicolás
8:45pm	Mancilla 43', 58'; Lobos 70'; Pulido 89'	Report	Arizala 8'; Gómez 90'

April 16, 2011 Round 15	Pachuca	1 – 2	Atlas	Estadio Hidalgo, Pachuca
7:00pm	Anchico 8'	Report	Moreno 71', 87'	Referee: Erim Ramírez

April 23, 2011 Round 16	Querétaro	1 – 1	Pachuca	Estadio Corregidora, Querétaro
5:00pm	Bueno 90'	Report	Gómez 28'	Referee: Juan Genaro Medrano

April 30, 2011 Round 17	Pachuca	1 – 1	Necaxa	Estadio Hidalgo, Pachuca
7:00pm	Anchico 15'	Report	Íñiguez 62'	Referee: Marco Antonio Rodríguez

=== Goalscorers ===
Position	Nation	Name	Goals scored
1.	(Paraguay)	Édgar Benítez	4
1.	(United States)	Herculez Gómez	4
3.	(Colombia)	Yulián Anchico	3
3.	(Colombia)	Franco Arizala	3
6.	(Mexico)	Paul Aguilar	1
6.	(Mexico)	Braulio Luna	1
TOTAL			16

=== Regular season statistics ===
==== Results summary ====
Overall								Home						Away					
Pld	W	D	L	GF	GA	GD	Pts	W	D	L	GF	GA	GD	W	D	L	GF	GA	GD
17	4	6	7	16	25	−9	18	2	3	3	6	11	−5	2	3	4	10	14	−4

Last updated: 6 May 2011.
Source: Clausura 2011 results

==== Results by round ====
Round	1	2	3	4	5	6	7	8	9	10	11	12	13	14	15	16	17
Ground	A	H	A	H	A	H	A	H	A	H	A	A	H	A	H	A	H
Result	W	D	D	L	L	W	L	D	L	L	D	W	W	L	L	D	D
Position	4	4	6	11	14	10	12	14	15	17	17	16	12	13	14	14	13

Updated to match(es) played on 23 April 2011. Source: Clausura 2011 results and mediotiempo.com
A = Away; H = Home; W = Win; D = Draw; L = Loss
