= 2011–12 C.F. Pachuca season =

Pachuca
2011–12 season
- Chairman: Jesús Martínez Patiño
- Manager: Efraín Flores
- Stadium: Estadio Hidalgo
- Apertura 2011: 6th Final Phase Quarter-finals
- Clausura 2012: 7th Final Phase Quarter-finals
- Top goalscorer: League: Apertura: Enrique Esqueda (8); Clausura: Mauro Cejas (6); All: Jaime Ayoví; Mauro Cejas; Enrique Esqueda (8)
Home colours	Away colours

The 2011–12 Pachuca season was the 65th professional season of Mexico's top-flight football league. The season is split into two tournaments—the Torneo Apertura and the Torneo Clausura—each with identical formats and each contested by the same eighteen teams. Pachuca began their season on July 23, 2011 against Santos Laguna, Pachuca play their homes games on Saturdays at 7:00pm local time.

== Torneo Apertura ==
=== Squad ===
Note: Flags indicate national team as defined under FIFA eligibility rules; some limited exceptions apply. Players may hold more than one non-FIFA nationality.

No.	Pos.	Nation	Player
1	GK	COL	Miguel Calero (Captain) *
2	DF	MEX	Leobardo López
3	DF	MEX	Dionicio Escalante
4	DF	MEX	Marco Pérez
5	DF	MEX	Horacio Cervantes
7	MF	MEX	Elías Hernández
9	FW	MEX	Enrique Esqueda
10	MF	ARG	Mauro Cejas
11	FW	ECU	Félix Borja
12	MF	MEX	Juan Carlos Rojas
14	MF	ECU	Segundo Castillo
15	MF	MEX	Juan Carlos Silva
16	MF	MEX	Carlos Rodríguez

No.	Pos.	Nation	Player
18	MF	USA	José Francisco Torres *
19	FW	MEX	Edy Brambila
21	MF	MEX	Héctor Herrera
22	GK	MEX	Carlos Fernández
23	FW	ECU	Jaime Ayoví
24	MF	MEX	Raúl Martínez
26	DF	ARG	Javier Muñoz
28	DF	MEX	Rogelio Chávez
29	FW	MEX	Luis Arcadio García
30	GK	MEX	Rodolfo Cota
33	DF	MEX	Francisco Santillán
110	MF	COL	Andrés Chitiva *

=== Regular season ===
==== Apertura 2011 results ====
July 23, 2011 Round 1	Pachuca	1 – 4	Santos Laguna	Estadio Hidalgo, Pachuca
17:00	Chávez (yellow card) 36'; López (yellow card) 43'; Muñoz Mustafá (yellow card) 76'; López 80' (pen.); Escalante (yellow card) 84'; Cota (yellow card) 90'	Report	Peralta 11', 37', 72'; Rodríguez (yellow card) 28'; Estrada 44', (yellow card) 67'; Salinas (yellow card) 52'	Referee: Miguel Ángel Flores

July 30, 2011 Round 2	Puebla	2 – 2	Pachuca	Estadio Cuauhtémoc, Puebla
12:00	Riascos 20'; Luis García 32'; Juárez (yellow card) 35'; Riascos (yellow card) 46'; Durán (yellow card) 75'; Beasley (yellow card) 82'; Salinas (yellow card) 89'	Report	Cejas (yellow card) 62'; Esqueda 68'; Ayoví 83'; Rodríguez (yellow card) 89'	Referee: Fabricio Morales

August 3, 2011 Round 3	Pachuca	1 – 0	Cruz Azul	Estadio Hidalgo, Pachuca
20:30	Ayoví 86'	Report	Gutiérrez (yellow card) 67'	Referee: Óscar Macias

August 6, 2011 Round 4	Querétaro	2 – 1	Pachuca	Estadio Corregidora, Querétaro
17:00	Mondragón (yellow card) 52'; Martínez (yellow card) 62'; Mena 75'; Vázquez 90+4', (yellow card) 90+5'	Report	Hernández 14', (yellow card) 90+3'; Herrera (yellow card) 36'	Referee: Ricardo Arellano

August 13, 2011 Round 5	Pachuca	3 – 0	Toluca	Estadio Hidalgo, Pachuca
19:00	Esqueda 2', (yellow card) 78'; Rodríguez 33'; Cejas 78'	Report	Sinha (red card) 73'; Talavera (yellow card) 83'	Referee: José Alfredo Peñaloza

August 19, 2011 Round 6	Estudiantes Tecos	2 – 1	Pachuca	Estadio Tres de Marzo, Zapopan
20:10	Zamogliny (yellow card) 14', (goal) 49'; Lillingston (yellow card) 33'; Alatorre (yellow card) 86'; Gómez 90'	Report	Ayoví 22', (yellow card) 68' (red card) 83'; Rodríguez (yellow card) 29'	Referee: Mauricio Morales

August 27, 2011 Round 7	Pachuca	2 – 0	América	Estadio Hidalgo, Pachuca
19:00	Borja 15', 64', (yellow card) 15'; Cejas (yellow card) 38'; Torres (yellow card) 43'; Brambila (yellow card) 43'	Report	Molina (yellow card) 58'; Valenzuela (red card) 83'; Vuoso (yellow card) 86'	Referee: Paul Delgadillo

September 10, 2011 Round 8	UANL	5 – 0	Pachuca	Estadio Universitario, San Nicolás
19:00	Mancilla 19', 36', 79'; Lobos 24'; Castillo 69' (o.g.); Torres Nilo (yellow card) 84'; Pacheco (yellow card) 87'	Report	Chávez (yellow card) 68'; Muñoz Mustafá (yellow card) 73'	Referee: Miguel Ángel Ayala

September 17, 2011 Round 9	Pachuca	4 – 2	Atlas	Estadio Hidalgo, Pachuca
19:00	Cervantes (yellow card) 22' (yellow-red card) 57'; Esqueda 32', (yellow card) 57'; Rodríguez 33'; Castillo 52'; López 90+2' (pen.)	Report	Romero 15'; Torres 32'; Ayala (yellow card) 41'; Vidrio (yellow card) 73'; Zamora (yellow card) 76'	Referee: Marco Antonio Rodríguez

September 24, 2011 Round 10	Pachuca	1 – 1	San Luis	Estadio Hidalgo, Pachuca
19:00	Cejas (yellow card) 12'; Castillo (yellow card) 26'; Esqueda 44'	Report	Matellán (yellow card) 10'; Arroyo 37'; Correa (yellow card) 58'; Pérez (yellow card) 87'	Referee: Jorge Isaac Rojas

October 1, 2011 Round 11	Atlante	0 – 1	Pachuca	Estadio Quintana Roo, Cancún
21:00	Guerrero (yellow card) 17'; Fonseca (yellow card) 65'; Cuevas (yellow card) 89'	Report	Brambilla (yellow card) 25'; Chávez (yellow card) 41'; Herrera (yellow card) 44'; Muñoz Mustafa (yellow card) 62'; Ayoví 68'; Rodríguez (yellow card) 83'	Referee: Fernando Guerrero

October 8, 2011 Round 12	Pachuca	1 – 0	Chiapas	Estadio Hidalgo, Pachuca
19:00	Hernández 7'; Esqueda (yellow card) 41'; Cejas (yellow card) 86'; Velázquez (yellow card) 89'	Report	Fuentes (yellow card) 21'; Razo (yellow card) 52' (yellow-red card) 71'; Rey (yellow card) 58'; Arizala (yellow card) 73'	Referee: Miguel Ángel Chacón

October 15, 2011 Round 13	Tijuana	3 – 2	Pachuca	Estadio Caliente, Tijuana
19:00	Almazán (yellow card) 42'; Íñiguez (yellow card) 43'; Enríquez 43'; Santiago 48', 68'	Report	Abrego 21' (o.g.); Borja (yellow card) 26'; Escalante (yellow card) 32'; Cejas (yellow card) 42'; Hernández 62'	Referee: Marco Antonio Rodríguez

October 22, 2011 Round 14	Pachuca	0 – 0	UNAM	Estadio Hidalgo, Pachuca
19:00	Brambila (yellow card) 26'; Ayoví (yellow card) 29'; Escalante (red card) 34'; Chávez (yellow card) 73'; Esqueda (yellow card) 90+1'	Report	Palencia (yellow card) 89'	Referee: José Alfredo Peñaloza

October 25, 2011 Round 15	Morelia	2 – 2	Pachuca	Estadio Morelos, Morelia
18:30	Lugo 6'; Huiqui (yellow card) 11'; Corona (yellow card) 34'; Sepúldeva 80'	Report	Borja 34'; Hernández 60'; Herrera (yellow card) 89'	Referee: Roberto García Orozco

October 29, 2011 Round 16	Pachuca	4 – 0	Monterrey	Estadio Hidalgo, Pachuca
19:00	Esqueda 14', 48'; Borja 33'; Cejas 75', (yellow card) 76'	Report		Referee: Francisco Chacón

November 5, 2011 Round 17	Guadalajara	2 – 2	Pachuca	Estadio Omnilife, Zapopan
19:00	Fabián 21'; Michel (red card) 50'; Torres 66'	Report	Muñoz Mustafa (red card) 52'; Brambila (yellow card) 70'; Esqueda 54' (pen.), 89', (yellow card) 90'	Referee: Ricardo Arellano

=== Final phase ===
November 20, 2011 Quarter-finals	Pachuca	0 – 1	UANL	Estadio Hidalgo, Pachuca
18:00	Cervantes (yellow card) 28'; Castillo (yellow card) 56'; López (yellow card) 70'; Chitiva (yellow card) 90'	Report	Mancilla 26'; Salcido (red card) 62'	Referee: Paul Delgadillo

November 27, 2011 Quarter-finals	UANL	3 – 0	Pachuca	Estadio Universitario, San Nicolás
19:00	Viniegra 11'; Lobos 26'; Álvarez 36'	Report	Herrera (yellow card) 28' (yellow-red card) 61'; Muñoz Mustafa (yellow card) 69'	Referee: Francisco Chacón

UANL advanced 4–0 on aggregate

=== Goalscorers ===
Position	Nation	Name	Goals scored
1.	(Mexico)	Enrique Esqueda	8
2.	(Ecuador)	Jaime Ayoví	4
2.	(Ecuador)	Félix Borja	4
2.	(Mexico)	Elías Hernández	4
5.	(Argentina)	Mauro Cejas	2
5.	(Mexico)	Leobardo López	2
5.	(Mexico)	Carlos Gerardo Rodríguez	2
7.	(Ecuador)	Segundo Castillo	1
7.		Own Goals	1
TOTAL			28

=== Results ===
==== Results summary ====
Overall								Home						Away					
Pld	W	D	L	GF	GA	GD	Pts	W	D	L	GF	GA	GD	W	D	L	GF	GA	GD
17	7	5	5	28	25	+3	26	6	2	1	17	7	+10	1	3	4	11	18	−7

Last updated: 6 November 2011.
Source: Apertura 2011 results

==== Results by round ====
Round	1	2	3	4	5	6	7	8	9	10	11	12	13	14	15	16	17
Ground	H	A	H	A	H	A	H	A	A	H	A	H	A	H	A	H	A
Result	L	D	W	L	W	L	W	L	W	D	W	W	L	D	D	W	D
Position	17	13	8	10	7	11	6	12	9	9	8	4	6	6	7	5	6

Updated to match(es) played on 6 November 2011. Source: Apertura 2011 results and mediotiempo.com
A = Away; H = Home; W = Win; D = Draw; L = Loss

== Transfers ==
=== In ===
#	Pos	Nat	Player	Age	From	Date	Notes
	DF	(Mexico)	Néstor Vidrio	22	Atlas	December 7, 2011	
	DF	(Mexico)	Arturo Ledesma	23	Guadalajara	December 8, 2011	Loan

=== Out ===
#	Pos	Nat	Player	Age	To	Date	Notes
1	GK	(Colombia)	Miguel Calero	40	Retired	October 22, 2011	
28	DF	(Mexico)	Rogelio Chávez	27	Atlas	December 6, 2011	
3	DF	(Mexico)	Dionicio Escalante	21	Guadalajara	December 8, 2011	
110	MF	(Colombia)	Andrés Chitiva	32	Retired	December 14, 2011	
7	MF	(Mexico)	Elías Hernández	23	UANL	December 21, 2011	

== Torneo Clausura ==
=== Squad ===
Note: Flags indicate national team as defined under FIFA eligibility rules; some limited exceptions apply. Players may hold more than one non-FIFA nationality.

No.	Pos.	Nation	Player
2	DF	MEX	Leobardo López (Captain)
3	DF	MEX	Néstor Vidrio
4	DF	MEX	Arturo Ledesma
5	DF	MEX	Horacio Cervantes
7	DF	MEX	Daniel Arreola
9	FW	MEX	Enrique Esqueda
10	MF	ARG	Mauro Cejas
11	FW	ECU	Félix Borja
12	MF	MEX	Juan Carlos Rojas
13	GK	MEX	Alfonso Blanco
14	MF	ECU	Segundo Castillo
16	MF	MEX	Carlos Gerardo Rodríguez

No.	Pos.	Nation	Player
18	MF	USA	José Francisco Torres
19	MF	MEX	Edy Germán Brambila
21	MF	MEX	Héctor Herrera
22	GK	MEX	Carlos Velázquez
23	FW	ECU	Jaime Ayoví
26	DF	ARG	Javier Muñoz Mustafá (Vice-Captain)
28	FW	MEX	Guillermo Franco
30	GK	MEX	Rodolfo Cota
34	DF	MEX	Abraham Torres Nilo
69	FW	MEX	Steven Almeida
84	FW	MEX	Marco Bueno

=== Regular season ===
==== Clausura 2012 results ====
January 7, 2012 Round 1	Santos Laguna	0 – 0	Pachuca	Estadio TSM Corona, Torreón
19:00	Rodríguez (yellow card) 68'; Ibáñez (yellow card) 81' (yellow-red card) 88'	Report	Cejas (yellow card) 12'; Ayoví (yellow card) 37'; Rodríguez (yellow card) 82'; Vidrio (yellow card) 87'	Referee: Miguel Ángel Flores

January 14, 2012 Round 2	Pachuca	3 – 1	Puebla	Estadio Hidalgo, Pachuca
19:00	Ayoví (yellow card) 21', (goal) 30'; Bueno 76', 90+3'; Rodríguez (yellow card) 90+3'	Report	Landín 43'	Referee: Miguel Ángel Ayala

January 21, 2012 Round 3	Cruz Azul	1 – 1	Pachuca	Estadio Azul, Mexico City
17:00	Villa 30'; Araujo (yellow card) 45+'	Report	Ayoví 19'; Castillo (yellow card) 31'; Cejas (red card) 44'; López (yellow card) 44'; Rodríguez (yellow card) 61'; Torres (yellow card) 63'; Herrera (yellow card) 66'; Arreola (yellow card) 79'; Cota (yellow card) 90+3'	Referee: Jorge Eduardo Gasso

January 28, 2012 Round 4	Pachuca	1 – 1	Querétaro	Estadio Hidalgo, Pachuca
19:00	Ayoví 51'; Herrera (yellow card) 52' (yellow-red card) 55'; Borja (yellow card) 63'	Report	Vitti 26'; Ponce (yellow card) 30'; Jiménez (yellow card) 63'; Ferrada (yellow card) 73'	Referee: Ricardo Arellano

February 5, 2012 Round 5	Toluca	3 – 4	Pachuca	Estadio Nemesio Díez, Toluca
12:00	Muñoz Mustafa 1' (o.g.); M. de la Torre (yellow card) 6'; Alonso 11'; Calderón 16'; Romagnoli (yellow card) 29'; Talavera (yellow card) 90+1'	Report	Muñoz Mustafa (yellow card) 9'; Cejas 35', 90+2' (pen.); Arreola 40', (yellow card) 41'; Bueno 64'; Cota (yellow card) 86'	Referee: Mauricio Morales

February 11, 2012 Round 6	Pachuca	2 – 0	Estudiantes Tecos	Estadio Hidalgo, Pachuca
19:00	Arreola 29', (yellow card) 76'; Ledesma (yellow card) 33'; Cejas 42'; Torres (yellow card) 61'; Rojas (yellow card) 77'; Borja 87'	Report	Lillingston (yellow card) 4'; Castro (yellow card) 63'; Sambueza (yellow card) 90+1'	Referee: José Alfredo Peñaloza

February 19, 2012 Round 7	América	1 – 0	Pachuca	Estadio Azteca, Mexico City
16:00	Vizcarrondo (yellow card) 2'; Benítez 57'; García (yellow card) 80'	Report	López (yellow card) 9'; Torres (yellow card) 68'; Muñoz Mustafá (yellow card) 81'; Vidrio (yellow card) 89'; Arreola (yellow card) 90+1'; Briambila (yellow card) 90+4'	Referee: Miguel Ángel Ortega

February 25, 2012 Round 8	Pachuca	1 – 1	UANL	Estadio Hidalgo, Pachuca
19:00	López 22', (yellow card) 39'; Brambila (yellow card) 37'; Muñoz Mustafá (yellow card) 39'; Vidrio (yellow card) 39'; Cejas (yellow card) 59'; Herrera (yellow card) 65'	Report	Jiménez (yellow card) 24'; Hernández 90+2'; Torres Nilo (yellow card) 90+3'	Referee: Fabricio Morales

March 3, 2012 Round 9	Atlas	0 – 0	Pachuca	Estadio Jalisco, Guadalajara
20:45	Ayala (yellow card) 76'; Chávez (yellow card) 80'	Report	Arreola (yellow card) 59'; Muñoz Mustafá (yellow card) 69'	Referee: Miguel Ángel Ayala

March 10, 2012 Round 10	San Luis	0 – 0	Pachuca	Estadio Alfonso Lastras, San Luis Potosí
20:45	Sánchez (yellow card) 45+'; Pereyra (yellow card) 77'	Report	Castillo (yellow card) 12'; Ayoví (yellow card) 82'	Referee: Jorge Isaac Rojas

March 17, 2012 Round 11	Pachuca	3 – 2	Atlante	Estadio Hidalgo, Pachuca
19:00	Cejas 4' (pen.), 7', 90', (yellow card) 64'; Ayoví (yellow card) 12'; López (yellow card) 19'; Arreola (yellow card) 40'; Castillo (yellow card) 85'	Report	Hernández (yellow card) 3'; Cuevas 34'; Rincón (yellow card) 43'; Guagua 48', (red card) 55'	Referee: Marco Antonio Rodríguez

March 22, 2012 Round 12	Chiapas	3 – 2	Pachuca	Estadio Victor Manuel Reyna, Tuxtla Gutiérrez
20:30	Noriega (red card) 2'; M. Martínez (yellow card) 10'; Rey 14', 23'; J. Martínez (yellow card) 68'; Esqueda 80'	Report	Castillo (yellow card) 19', (goal) 37'; Arreola (yellow card) 32'; Franco (yellow card) 57'; Borja 72', (yellow card) 74' (yellow-red card) 90+2'; Brambila (yellow card) 86'	Referee: Jorge Antonio Pérez

March 30, 2012 Round 13	Pachuca	1 – 0	Tijuana	Estadio Hidalgo, Pachuca
20:10	Muñoz Mustafá 62'; Franco (yellow card) 67'; Cota (yellow card) 83'	Report	Castillo (yellow card) 28'; Núñez (yellow card) 55'; Lema (red card) 73' (Assistant coach); Gandolfi (yellow card) 75'	Referee: Mauricio Morales

April 8, 2012 Round 14	UNAM	0 – 1	Pachuca	Estadio Olímpico Universitario, Mexico City
12:00	Sandoval (yellow card) 48'	Report	Franco (yellow card) 47'; Torres (yellow card) 58'; Rodríguez (yellow card) 63'; Borja 80'	Referee: Óscar Macias

April 14, 2012 Round 15	Pachuca	1 – 2	Morelia	Estadio Hidalgo, Pachuca
19:00	Torres (yellow card) 16'; Herrera (yellow card) 43'; Vidrio (yellow card) 65'; Bueno 71'	Report	Márquez 21', (yellow card) 56'; Cabrera (yellow card) 51'; Rojas (yellow card) 53'; Lugo 77'; Boy (red card) 90+2' (manager)	Referee: Miguel Ángel Ortega

April 21, 2012 Round 16	Monterrey	1 – 1	Pachuca	Estadio Tecnológico, Monterrey
21:00	Basanta (yellow card) 58'; Suazo 90+4'	Report	Arreola 15', (yellow card) 73'; Cejas (yellow card) 39'; Rojas (yellow card) 70'; Franco (yellow card) 84'	Referee: Jorge Isaac Rojas

April 28, 2012 Round 17	Pachuca	3 – 1	Guadalajara	Estadio Hidalgo, Pachuca
19:00	Ayoví 4'; Muñoz Mustafá (yellow card) 28'; Castillo 40'; Arreola (yellow card) 52'; Brambila (yellow card) 53'; López 76' (pen.)	Report	Araujo (yellow card) 2'; Salazar 34'; Michel (yellow card) 41'; Reynoso (yellow card) 45' de Luna (yellow card) 75'	Referee: Antony Zanjuampa

=== Final phase ===
May 2, 2012 Quarter-finals	Pachuca	1 – 3	América	Estadio Hidalgo, Pachuca
20:30	Rodríguez (yellow card) 14'; Muñoz Mustafá (yellow card) 54'; Vidrio (yellow card) 65'; López 77'	Report	Molina (yellow card) 21', (goal) 38'; Bermúdez 42', 58'; Reyes (yellow card) 76'; Muñoz (yellow card) 83'	Referee: Erim Ramírez

May 5, 2012 Quarter-finals	América	0 – 1	Pachuca	Estadio Azteca, Mexico City
18:00	Mosquera (yellow card) 75'	Report	López (yellow card) 13'; Vidrio 37', (yellow card) 44'	Referee: Marco Antonio Rodríguez

América advanced 3–2 on aggregate

=== Goalscorers ===
==== Regular season ====
Position	Nation	Name	Goals scored
1.	(Argentina)	Mauro Cejas	6
2.	(Ecuador)	Jaime Ayoví	4
2.	(Mexico)	Marco Bueno	4
4.	(Mexico)	Daniel Arreola	3
5.	(Ecuador)	Félix Borja	2
5.	(Ecuador)	Segundo Castillo	2
5.	(Mexico)	Leobardo López	2
8.	(Argentina)	Javier Muñoz Mustafá	1
TOTAL			24

==== Final phase ====
Position	Nation	Name	Goals scored
1.	(Mexico)	Leobardo López	1
1.	(Mexico)	Néstor Vidrio	1
TOTAL			2

=== Results ===
==== Results summary ====
Overall								Home						Away					
Pld	W	D	L	GF	GA	GD	Pts	W	D	L	GF	GA	GD	W	D	L	GF	GA	GD
17	7	7	3	24	17	+7	28	5	2	1	15	8	+7	2	5	2	9	9	0

Last updated: 28 April 2012.
Source: Clausura 2012 results

==== Results by round ====
Round	1	2	3	4	5	6	7	8	9	10	11	12	13	14	15	16	17
Ground	A	H	A	H	A	H	A	H	A	A	H	A	H	A	H	A	H
Result	D	W	D	D	W	W	L	D	D	D	W	L	W	W	L	D	W
Position	11	5	8	8	5	3	6	7	7	8	6	7	6	6	7	7	6

Updated to match(es) played on 29 April 2012. Source: Clausura 2012 results and mediotiempo.com
A = Away; H = Home; W = Win; D = Draw; L = Loss

== Copa Pachuca ==
Semi-finals
6 July – Estadio Hidalgo
Pumas UNAM	1
Monarcas Morelia	2
6 July – Estadio Hidalgo
Pachuca	2 (4)
Saprissa	2 (3)

Final
8 July – Estadio Hidalgo
Pachuca	2 (3)
Monarcas Morelia	2 (1)
Third place
8 July – Estadio Hidalgo
Pumas UNAM	1
Saprissa	0
