= InterLiga 2009 Final =

After both finals have been played, both winners qualify to the Copa Libertadores. Of the two winners, the team with the highest points during the group stages will be dubbed "Mexico 2"

== Pachuca vs Atlas ==
All times EST

2009-01-11
19:00

Pachuca (Mexico)	3–3	(Mexico) Atlas
Benitez 14' 17'; Giménez 34'	(Report)	Vargas 49'; López 71' (o.g.); Achucarro 88'
Penalties
López (penalty scored); B. Pérez (penalty missed); Aguilar (penalty missed); Rodríguez (penalty scored); Muñoz (penalty scored); Caballero (penalty scored); Álvarez (penalty missed); I. Pérez (penalty scored); Torres (penalty scored); Calero (penalty scored); López (penalty scored); B. Pérez (penalty scored); Aguilar (penalty scored)	10–9	(penalty scored) Pacheco; (penalty missed) Robles; (penalty missed) Achucarro; (penalty scored) Gutiérrez; (penalty scored) Marioni; (penalty scored) Torres; (penalty missed) L. Ayala; (penalty scored) Fuentes; (penalty scored) Chávez; (penalty scored) Hernández; (penalty scored) Pacheco; (penalty scored) } Robles; (penalty missed) Achucarro

Home Depot Center, Carson, California
Attendance: 27,000
Referee: Jair Marrufo (Mexico)

Pachuca	Atlas

PACHUCA:
GK	1	(Colombia) Miguel Calero (c)
DF	22	(Mexico) Paul Aguilar	(yellow card) 70'
DF	2	(Mexico) Leobardo López
DF	26	(Argentina) Javier Muñoz
DF	4	(Mexico) Marco Iván Pérez
MF	11	(Mexico) José María Cárdenas		(substituted off) 58'
MF	6	(Mexico) Jaime Correa
MF	18	(United States) José Francisco Torres
MF	19	(Argentina) Christian Giménez		(substituted off) 71'
FW	10	(Paraguay) Edgar Benitez		(substituted off) 54'
FW	21	(Panama) Blas Pérez
Substitutes:
GK	30	(Mexico) Rodolfo Cota
FW	27	(Mexico) Edy Germán Brambila
MF	8	(Mexico) Gabriel Caballero		(substituted on) 54'
MF	16	(Mexico) Carlos Gerardo Rodríguez		(substituted on) 58'
MF	15	(Mexico) Luis Montes
FW	9	(Mexico) Ulises Mendivil
MF	7	(Argentina) Damián Álvarez		(substituted on) 71'
Manager:
(Mexico) Enrique Meza

ATLAS:
GK	21	(Mexico) Pedro Hernández
DF	4	(Mexico) Luis Enrique Robles
DF	2	(Chile) Ismael Fuentes
DF	16	(Mexico) Hugo Ayala	(yellow card) 41' (yellow-red card) 45'
DF	30	(Mexico) Dárvin Chávez
MF	8	(Mexico) Lucas Ayala
MF	55	(Mexico) Oscar Vera		(substituted off) 38'
MF	17	(Paraguay) Jorge Achucarro	(yellow card) 42'
MF	18	(Argentina) Dario Botinelli		(substituted off) 64'
FW	11	(Argentina) Bruno Marioni (c)	(yellow card) 85'
FW	9	(Uruguay) Gonzalo Vargas		(substituted off) 81'
Substitutes:
GK	12	(Mexico) José Francisco Canales
DF	6	(Mexico) Jorge Torres Nilo		(substituted on) 38'
MF	22	(Mexico) Edgar Pacheco		(substituted on) 64'
DF	53	(Mexico) Néstor Vidrio
MF	7	(Mexico) Jorge Hernández
MF	25	(Mexico) Carlos Alberto Gutiérrez		(substituted on) 81'
Manager:
(Argentina) Dario Franco

Assistant referees:
Kermit Quinsenberry (Mexico)
CJ Morgante (Mexico)
Fourth official:
Kevin Stott (United States)

== Guadalajara vs Morelia ==
All times EST

2009-01-11
21:30

Guadalajara (Mexico)	1–1	(Mexico) Morelia
Fabián 65'	(Report)	Ochoa 57' (o.g.)
Penalties
Ochoa (penalty scored); Fabián (penalty scored); Reynoso (penalty scored); Pineda (penalty scored)	4–2	(penalty missed) Tiago; (penalty scored) Cabrera; (penalty scored) Rojas; (penalty missed) Droguett

Home Depot Center, Carson, California
Attendance: 27,000
Referee: Baldomero Toledo (United States)

Guadalajara	Morelia

GUADALAJARA:
GK	1	(Mexico) Luis Ernesto Michel
DF	33	(Mexico) Mario de Luna		(substituted off) 65'
DF	4	(Mexico) Héctor Reynoso
DF	5	(Mexico) Patricio Araujo	(yellow card) 59'
DF	20	(Mexico) Edgar Mejia		(substituted off) 74'
MF	18	(Mexico) Xavier Baez
MF	17	(Mexico) Sergio Amaury Ponce
MF	13	(Mexico) Sergio Ávila		(substituted off) 68'
MF	11	(Mexico) Ramón Morales (c)
FW	10	(Mexico) Alberto Medina
FW	27	(Mexico) Carlos Ochoa
Substitutes:
GK	30	(Mexico) Víctor Hugo Hernández
DF	6	(Mexico) Omar Esparza
MF	16	(Mexico) Edgar Solís
MF	7	(Mexico) Gonzalo Pineda		(substituted on) 68'
MF	8	(Mexico) Marco Fabián		(substituted on) 65'
MF	24	(Mexico) Francisco Mendoza
FW	14	(Mexico) Javier Hernández		(substituted on) 74'
Manager:
(Mexico) Efraín Flores

MORELIA:
GK	23	(Mexico) Moisés Muñoz	(yellow card) 93'
DF	27	(Mexico) Omar Trujillo	(yellow card) 21'
DF	3	(Mexico) Alberto Lucio
DF	26	(Argentina) Mauricio Romero	(yellow card) 15'
DF	7	(Mexico) Marvin Cabrera	(yellow card) 51'
MF	5	(Brazil) Wilson Tiago
MF	13	(Mexico) Fernando Salazar	(yellow card) 49' (yellow-red card) 67'
MF	16	(Mexico) Adrián Aldrete
MF	11	(Chile) Hugo Droguett	(yellow card) 89'
FW	77	(Mexico) Elias Hernández		(substituted off) 72'
FW	18	(Peru) Andrés Mendoza		(substituted off) 83'
Substitutes:
GK	1	(Mexico) Miguel Ángel Fraga
DF	45	(Mexico) Adalberto Palma
DF	71	(Mexico) Enrique Pérez
MF	8	(Mexico) Ignacio Carrasco
MF	10	(Costa Rica) Oscar Emilio Rojas		(substituted on) 72'
FW	14	(Mexico) Ever Guzmán
FW	9	(Mexico) Miguel Sabah		(substituted on) 83'
Manager:
(Mexico) Luis Fernando Tena
