= José Francisco Torres =

American soccer player

Personal information
- Full name: José Francisco Torres Mezzell
- Date of birth: October 29, 1987 (age 39)
- Place of birth: Longview, Texas, United States
- Height: 5 ft 5 in (1.65 m)
- Position: Midfielder

Youth career
- 2003–2006: Pachuca

Senior career*
Years	Team	Apps	(Gls)
2006–2013	Pachuca	151	(4)
2013–2019	Tigres UANL	99	(2)
2018–2019	→ Puebla (loan)	11	(1)
2021	Colorado Springs Switchbacks	26	(1)
2022–2023	Rio Grande Valley FC	41	(2)

International career^{‡}
2008–2013	United States	26	(0)
Medal record
Representing United States
FIFA Confederations Cup
Runner-up	2009 South Africa	Team
CONCACAF Gold Cup
Winner	CONCACAF Gold Cup	2013
Men's Soccer
- * Club domestic league appearances and goals as of 19:29, October 16, 2023 (UTC) ‡ National team caps and goals as of July 28, 2013

José Francisco Torres Mezzell (born October 29, 1987) is an American professional soccer player who plays as a midfielder. He is popularly known by his nickname Gringo.

He is usually deployed as a central midfielder but can also play as a full-back. Torres has played for the United States national team.

== Early life ==
Torres was born in Texas to a Mexican father and an American mother. He played two years for Longview High School and was voted the team's MVP both seasons, with 31 goals and 39 assists in total. After his sophomore year, he was scouted and signed by Mexican club Pachuca.

== Club career ==
Torres was recruited by Pachuca while he was still attending high school in Texas. He broke into the starting lineup during the 2008 Apertura season in central midfield. He appeared in all three matches at the 2008 FIFA Club World Cup for Pachuca, starting twice. In the InterLiga 2009 Final, Torres scored the clinching penalty kick that sent Pachuca through to the Copa Libertadores 2009. In November 2012, he was transferred to Tigres UANL. On December 22, 2012, Torres made his debut with Tigres in a friendly match against Pumas UNAM in the Estadio Universitario. Tigres was the Apertura 2015 champion, and Torres played the second leg of the final.

On November 25, 2020, after more than two years without playing a professional game, Torres joined USL Championship side Colorado Springs Switchbacks ahead of their 2021 season.

On February 21, 2022, Torres signed with USL Championship side Rio Grande Valley FC.

== International career ==
Torres was eligible to choose between representing Mexico, the nation of his father's heritage and where he played club soccer, or his native United States. Both national federations had been tracking Torres' progress at Pachuca.

Torres was invited by Peter Nowak to play for the United States U-23 team at the 2008 Summer Olympics in Beijing. Torres declined the invitation when Pachuca promised a position in their starting lineup if he stayed with the club. However, only three months later, on October 2, 2008, Torres announced his intention to represent the United States at the international level, and was called in to the U.S. camp by Bob Bradley within days.

He made his U.S. debut against Cuba on October 11, 2008, coming on as a substitute for Heath Pearce in the sixty-eighth minute. He made his first start against Trinidad and Tobago four days later. Torres was also included in the roster that played against Mexico in February 2009, but did not play. He was a member of the U.S. squad for the 2009 Confederations Cup but did not play in the tournament. He was selected to the 23-man roster to represent the United States at the 2010 World Cup in South Africa and started a group stage game against Slovenia.

Torres continued to be a part of the U.S. set up under Bradley's successor, Jürgen Klinsmann, and was part of the qualification cycle for the 2014 FIFA World Cup. Despite being a part of the 2013 Gold Cup winning team, he ended falling outside of Klinsmann's plans, and ultimately was not part of the U.S. team that went to the World Cup in Brazil.

== Career statistics ==
=== Club ===
As of October 14, 2023

Club	Season	League				Playoffs			National Cup			Continental			Other			Total		
Club	Season	Division	Apps	Goals	Assists	Apps	Goals	Assists	Apps	Goals	Assists	Apps	Goals	Assists	Apps	Goals	Assists	Apps	Goals	Assists
Pachuca	2006–07	Liga MX	1	0	0	—	—	—	—	—	—	—	—	—	—	—	—	1	0	0
Pachuca	2007–08	Liga MX	10	0	2	—	—	—	—	—	—	—	—	—	—	—	—	10	0	2
Pachuca	2008–09	Liga MX	30	1	1	6 (Note: Appearance(s) in La Liguilla)	1	0	—	—	—	2 (Note: Appearance(s) in Copa Libertadores)	0	0	3 (Note: Appearance(s) in Interliga)	0	0	41	2	1
Pachuca	2009–10	Liga MX	28	1	1	4	0	0	0	0	0	9 (Note: Appearance(s) in CONCACAF Champions League)	0	1	—	—	—	41	1	2
Pachuca	2010–11	Liga MX	27	0	0	2	0	0	—	—	—	2	0	0	4 (Note: Two appearance(s) in FIFA Club World Cup) (Note: Two appearance(s) in North American Superliga)	0	0	35	0	0
Pachuca	2011–12	Liga MX	24	0	6	2	0	0	—	—	—	—	—	—	—	—	—	26	0	6
Pachuca	2012–13	Liga MX	13	1	1	—	—	—	2 (Note: Appearance(s) in Copa MX)	1	0	–	–	–	—	—	—	15	2	1
Pachuca	Total		133	3	11	14	1	0	2	1	0	13	0	1	7	0	0	169	5	13
Tigres UANL	2012–13	Liga MX	15	0	0	2	0	0	—	—	—	1	0	0	—	—	—	18	0	0
Tigres UANL	2013–14	Liga MX	7	0	0	–	–	–	10	3	0	—	—	—	—	—	—	17	3	0
Tigres UANL	2014–15	Liga MX	21	0	0	–	–	–	7	1	0	2	0	0	—	—	—	30	1	0
Tigres UANL	2015–16	Liga MX	14	0	0	—	—	—	1	0	0	7	1	0	—	—	—	22	1	0
Tigres UANL	2016–17	Liga MX	17	0	0	—	—	—	—	—	—	1	0	0	1 (Note: Appearance(s) in Campeón de Campeones)	0	0	19	0	0
Tigres UANL	2017–18	Liga MX	1	0	0	—	—	—	1	0	0	3	0	0	1	0	0	5	0	0
Puebla	2018–19	Liga MX	11	1	0	—	—	—	1	0	0	—	—	—	—	—	—	11	1	0
Puebla	Total		86	1	0	2	0	0	20	4	0	14	1	0	2	0	0	124	1	0
Colorado Springs Switchbacks FC	2021	USL Championship	20	1	0	—	—	—	–	–	–	—	—	—	—	—	—	20	1	0
Rio Grande Valley FC	2022	USL Championship	22	0	0	—	—	—	–	–	–	—	—	—	—	—	—	22	0	0
Rio Grande Valley FC	2023	USL Championship	21	1	0	—	—	—	1	0	0	—	—	—	—	—	—	22	1	0
Rio Grande Valley FC	Total		63	2	0	0	0	0	1	0	0	0	0	0	0	0	0	64	2	0
Career total			382	6	11	16	1	0	23	5	0	27	1	1	9	0	0	457	13	12

=== International ===
As of July 28, 2013

National team	Year	Apps	Goals
United States
United States	2008	2	0
United States	2009	5	0
United States	2010	4	0
United States	2011	3	0
United States	2012	6	0
United States	2013	6	0
United States	2014	2	0
Total		28	0

== Honors ==
Pachuca

- Primera División de México: Clausura 2007
- CONCACAF Champions League: 2007, 2008, 2009–10
- Copa Sudamericana: 2006
- North American SuperLiga: 2007

Tigres UANL

- Liga MX: Apertura 2015, Apertura 2016, Apertura 2017
- Copa MX: Clausura 2014
- Campeón de Campeones: 2016, 2017

United States

- CONCACAF Gold Cup: 2013
