= Paul Aguilar =

Mexican footballer (born 1986)

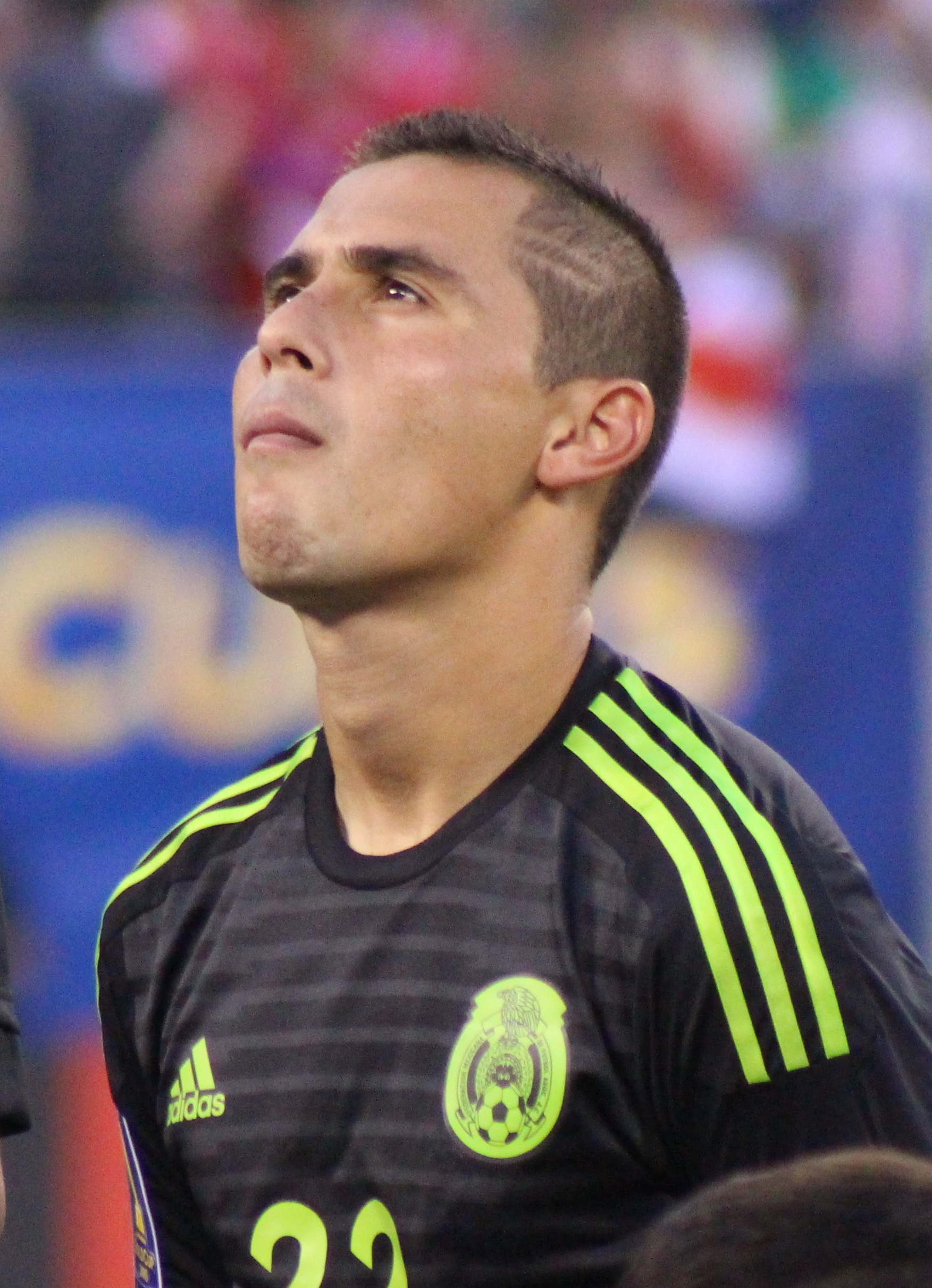
- Aguilar with Mexico at the 2015 CONCACAF Gold Cup

Personal information
- Full name: Paul Nicolás Aguilar Rojas
- Date of birth: 6 March 1986 (age 40)
- Place of birth: Concordia, Sinaloa, Mexico
- Height: 1.80 m (5 ft 11 in)
- Position: Right-back

Youth career
- 2002–2004: Pachuca

Senior career*
Years	Team	Apps	(Gls)
2004–2005	Pachuca Juniors	25	(2)
2005–2006	→ Indios (loan)	36	(2)
2006–2011	Pachuca	134	(11)
2011–2020	América	308	(13)
2021–2022	Juárez	8	(0)
Total		511	(28)

International career
2009–2016	Mexico	55	(5)
Medal record
Representing Mexico
CONCACAF Gold Cup
Winner	CONCACAF Gold Cup	2011
Winner	CONCACAF Gold Cup	2015
- * Club domestic league appearances and goals as of 12 October 2021

Paul Nicolás Aguilar Rojas (born 6 March 1986) is a Mexican former professional footballer who played as a right-back.

Aguilar represented Mexico at the 2010 and 2014 FIFA World Cup, as well as the 2011 and 2015 CONCACAF Gold Cup, and the Copa América Centenario.

== Club career ==
=== Pachuca ===
Paul Aguilar began his career with Pachuca in 2002. He started off in Pachuca's affiliate (second division) team, Pachuca Juniors. In 2004, he was loaned to Indios de Ciudad Juárez for two seasons in order to gain more experience. After returning to Pachuca in 2005 and making 27 appearances with the "B team" (Pachuca Juniors), Aguilar made his first-team debut in the 2006 Apertura tournament on 6 August in a match against Cruz Azul, with the match ending in a 2–3 defeat. Paul Aguilar played the entire ninety minutes and scored a goal in the 56th minute of the game. Pachuca won the 2007 Clausura championship after defeating América in the final. Paul Aguilar became a mainstay within the squad and won the confidence of manager Enrique Meza. Aguilar would barely miss a game since earning a starting position at right-back during the 2008 Clausura. Paul Aguilar also participated in the 2008 and 2010 FIFA Club World Cups with Pachuca. His performance with the club earned him a spot in the final 23-man national team squad who would play the 2010 FIFA World Cup. After five years and ten seasons with Pachuca, Paul Aguilar was sold to América for the 2011 Apertura in exchange for Juan Carlos Silva and Enrique Esqueda.

=== América ===
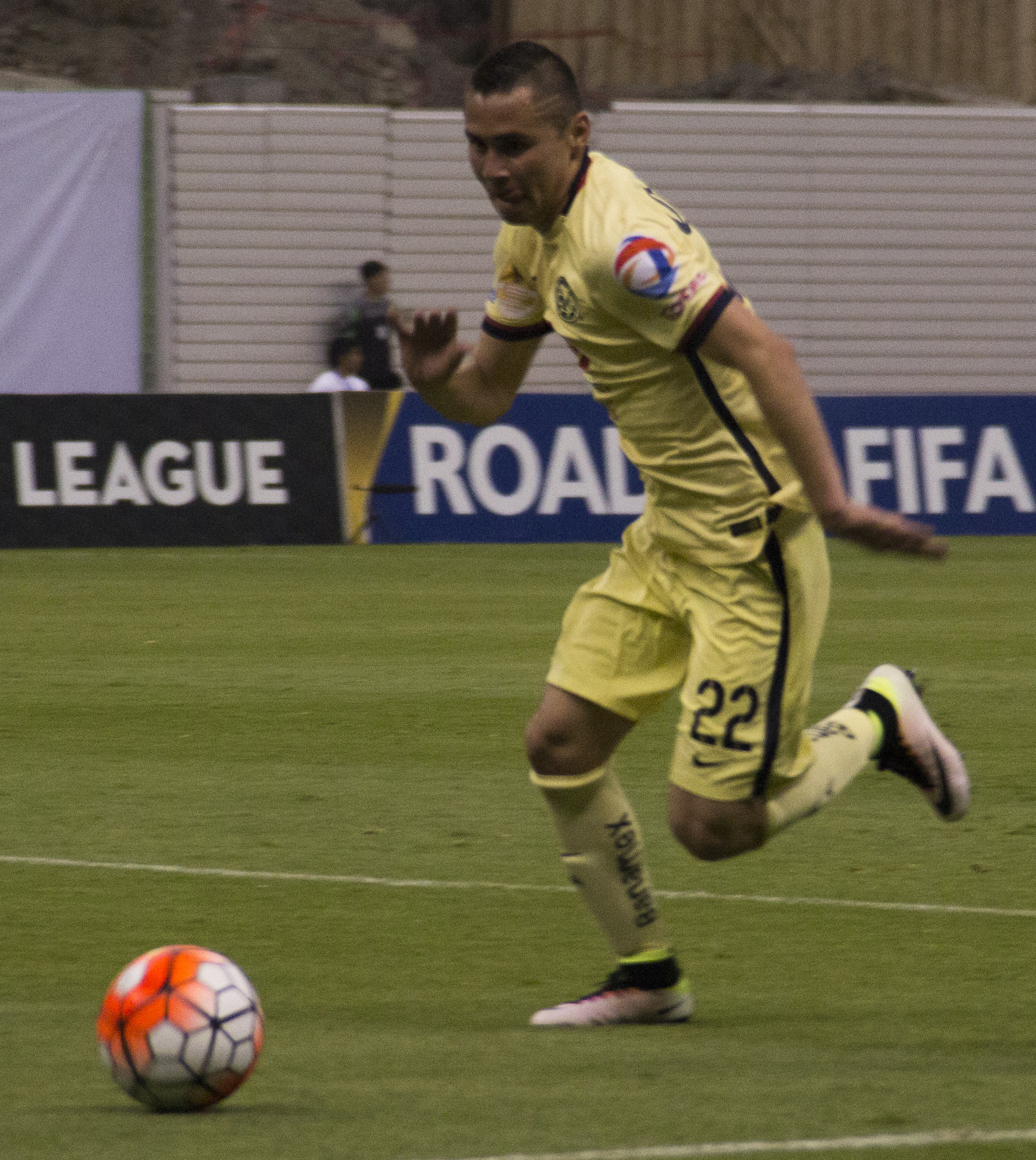
Aguilar in 2016

On 23 May 2011, Aguilar officially joined Club América for the Apertura tournament. Aguilar made his debut with América on 31 July in a league match against Toluca, which ended in a 1–1 draw. Upon his arrival Aguilar became a popular player with the club's fans. He scored his first goal with América in the 90th minute against arch-rivals Guadalajara in the Súper Clásico.

On 26 May 2013, Aguilar won his first title with América after defeating Cruz Azul in the Clausura final, playing in both legs.

On 26 March 2014, Aguilar signed a two-year contract extension with América, which will keep him at the club until 2016. Aguilar had previously stated publicly that he would like to end his career at América. Aguilar made his 100th league appearance for América on 30 May in the 4–0 win over Guadalajara. Prior to the first-leg of the 2014 Apertura semifinal series against Monterrey, it was reported that Aguilar was separated from the squad by manager Antonio Mohamed due to an alleged dressing-room confrontation between the two.

On 2 December 2020, Aguilar left Club América.

=== Juárez ===
On 19 July 2021, Aguilar signed with FC Juárez.

== International career ==
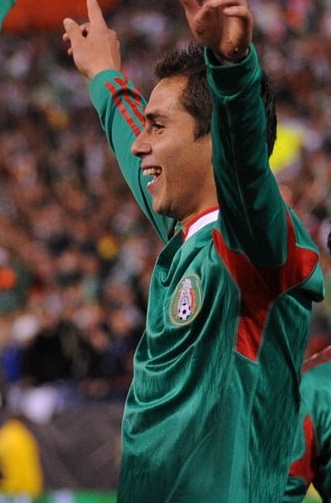
Aguilar with Mexico in 2010

In October 2007, Aguilar received his first senior national team call-up by coach Hugo Sánchez to play a friendly match against Nigeria, however he did no see playing time. In 2009, Aguilar was called up again, this time by coach Javier Aguirre, and made his debut with the national team on 30 September in a friendly match against Colombia. The match ended in a 1–2 defeat, with Aguilar played the entire 90 minutes and scoring Mexico's only goal.

In early 2010, Aguirre called-up Aguilar for a series of international friendlies in preparation for the 2010 FIFA World Cup. Mexico's first game of 2010 was a 5–0 win over Bolivia, in which Paul scored his second goal for Mexico in only his second appearance. He eventually made the final 23-player roster for the World Cup. He started in the tournament's inaugural match against hosts South Africa, but was substituted out for Andrés Guardado in the 55th minute. He did not participate in any of the next three matches.

Aguilar was a part of the winning squad at the 2011 CONCACAF Gold Cup, however he only saw playing time in the semi-final match against Honduras. Aguilar also participated in the 2011 Copa America held in Argentina, playing in all three group matches as a right-back. In 2012, he saw no activity with the national team.

Aguilar would not receive another call-up until late 2013, this time by new coach Miguel Herrera for the two World Cup intercontinental playoff matches against New Zealand. Aguilar would go on to score Mexico's first goal in the 5–1 win over New Zealand at the Estadio Azteca on 13 November. The playoff ended in a combined 9–3 win for Mexico, thus qualifying them to the 2014 FIFA World Cup. Aguilar would be included in the final 23-man squad for the World Cup. During the 2014 World Cup, he started at right-back for Mexico in all four matches.

During the 2015 CONCACAF Cup, a one-off tournament meant to serve a qualifier to the 2017 FIFA Confederations Cup, Aguilar scored a game-winning volley in overtime for Mexico in the 3–2 result.

In the run-up to the 2018 FIFA World Cup, national coach Juan Carlos Osorio decided not to call-up Aguilar following alleged criticism from the player towards Osorio's tactics.

== Career statistics ==
=== International ===
As of match played 19 June 2016

National team	Year	Apps	Goals
Mexico	2009	1	1
Mexico	2010	11	1
Mexico	2011	7	0
Mexico	2013	4	1
Mexico	2014	15	0
Mexico	2015	11	2
Mexico	2016	6	0
Total		55	5

=== International goals ===
Scores and results list Mexico's goal tally first.

Goal	Date	Venue	Opponent	Score	Result	Competition
1.	30 September 2009	Cotton Bowl, Dallas, United States	Colombia	1–2	1–2	Friendly
2.	24 February 2010	Candlestick Park, San Francisco, United States	Bolivia	5–0	5–0	Friendly
3.	13 November 2013	Estadio Azteca, Mexico City, Mexico	New Zealand	1–0	5–1	2014 FIFA World Cup qualification
4.	15 July 2015	Bank of America Stadium, Charlotte, United States	Trinidad and Tobago	1–0	4–4	2015 CONCACAF Gold Cup
5.	10 October 2015	Rose Bowl, Pasadena, United States	United States	3–2	3–2	2015 CONCACAF Cup

== Honours ==
Pachuca

- Mexican Primera División: Clausura 2007
- CONCACAF Champions League: 2007, 2008, 2009–10
- North American SuperLiga: 2007
- Copa Sudamericana: 2006

América

- Liga MX: Clausura 2013, Apertura 2014, Apertura 2018
- Copa MX: Clausura 2019
- Campeón de Campeones: 2019
- CONCACAF Champions League: 2014–15, 2015–16

Mexico

- CONCACAF Gold Cup: 2011, 2015
- CONCACAF Cup: 2015

Individual

- Liga MX Best XI: Clausura 2015, Apertura 2015, Clausura 2016
