= 2009 InterLiga =

Tournament details
- Host country: United States
- Dates: January 2–11
- Teams: 8 (from 1 confederation)
- Venue: 3 (in 3 host cities)

Tournament statistics
- Matches played: 14
- Goals scored: 42 (3 per match)
- Top scorer(s): (Mexico) Carlos Ochoa (Paraguay) Edgar Benítez (4 goals each)

The 2009 InterLiga was the 6th edition of the tournament that determined the last two Mexican spots in the 2009 Copa Libertadores.

== Venues ==
Stadium	City	Capacity
Home Depot Center	Carson, CA	27,000
Pizza Hut Park	Frisco, TX	20,500
Robertson Stadium	Houston, TX	32,000

== Qualification ==
The eight qualified teams were the eight best-positioned teams in the 2008 Apertura general table who did not qualify for the 2009 Copa Libertadores (San Luis) directly and did not qualify for the 2008–09 CONCACAF Champions League from the previous season (Atlante, UNAM, Cruz Azul, and Santos Laguna).

Pos	Team	Pld	W	D	L	GF	GA	GD	Pts	Qualification
1	San Luis	17	8	5	4	24	20	+4	29	2009 Copa Libertadores Second Stage
2	Toluca	17	7	6	4	25	16	+9	27	2009 InterLiga
3	Atlante	17	7	6	4	22	16	+6	27	Not eligible (Note: Atlante, UNAM, Cruz Azul, and Santos Laguna do not qualify to the InterLiga due to existing commitment in the 2008–09 CONCACAF Champions League.)
4	UNAM	17	7	5	5	22	13	+9	26	Not eligible
5	Cruz Azul	17	7	5	5	29	13	+16	26	Not eligible
6	UANL	17	7	5	5	22	16	+6	26	2009 InterLiga
7	UAG	17	7	4	6	30	28	+2	25	2009 InterLiga
8	Guadalajara	17	6	7	4	23	23	0	25	2009 InterLiga
9	Morelia	17	6	6	5	27	20	+7	24	2009 InterLiga
10	Santos Laguna	17	5	7	5	22	20	+2	22	Not eligible
11	Atlas	17	6	4	7	23	27	−4	22	2009 InterLiga
12	Pachuca	17	5	6	6	25	25	0	21	2009 InterLiga
13	América	17	5	6	6	22	23	−1	21	2009 InterLiga
14	Ciudad Juárez	17	5	4	8	18	26	−8	19	
15	Monterrey	17	5	4	8	18	26	−8	19	
16	Chiapas	17	5	3	9	20	34	−14	18	
17	Necaxa	17	3	6	8	17	24	−7	15	
18	Puebla	17	2	9	6	12	21	−9	15	

Updated to match(es) played on 11 January 2009. Source:
Rules for classification: 1) points; 2) goal difference; 3) number of goals scored.

== Group stage ==
=== Group A ===
Team	Pld	W	D	L	GF	GA	GD	Pts
Pachuca	3	2	0	1	5	3	+2	6
Morelia	3	1	1	1	4	2	+2	4
Toluca	3	1	1	1	3	2	+1	4
UAG	3	1	0	2	1	6	−5	3

=== Group B ===
Team	Pld	W	D	L	GF	GA	GD	Pts
Guadalajara	3	2	1	0	8	4	+4	7
Atlas	3	1	1	1	5	4	+1	4
América	3	1	1	1	5	6	−1	4
UANL	3	0	1	2	3	7	−4	1

== Finals ==
2009-01-11
19:00

Pachuca (Mexico)	3 – 3	(Mexico) Atlas
Benitez 14' 17'; Giménez 34'	(Report)	Vargas 49'; López 71' (o.g.); Achucarro 88'
Penalties
	10 – 9

Home Depot Center, Carson, California
Attendance: 27,000
Referee: Jair Marrufo (United States)

2009-01-11
21:30

Guadalajara (Mexico)	1 – 1	(Mexico) Morelia
Fabián 65'	(Report)	Ochoa 57' (o.g.)
Penalties
	4 – 2

Home Depot Center, Carson, California
Attendance: 27,000
Referee: Baldomero Toledo (United States)

== Goalscorers ==
As of 12 January 2009.

4 goals

- (Mexico) Carlos Ochoa (Guadalajara)
- (Paraguay) Edgar Benítez (Pachuca)

2 goals

- (Paraguay) Jorge Achucarro (Atlas)
- (Argentina) Bruno Marioni (Atlas)
- (Mexico) Sergio Santana (Toluca)
- (Uruguay) Gonzalo Vargas (Atlas)

1 goal

- (Mexico) Sergio Ávila (Guadalajara)
- (Chile) Jean Beausejour (América)
- (Paraguay) Ariel Bogado (UANL)
- (Mexico) Edy Brambila (Pachuca)
- (Paraguay) Salvador Cabañas (América)
- (Colombia) Andrés Chitiva (América)
- (Brazil) Robert de Pinho (América)
- (Chile) Hugo Droguett (Morelia)

1 goal (cont.)

- (Mexico) Marco Fabian (Guadalajara)
- (Argentina) Christian Giménez (Pachuca)
- (Mexico) Diego Jiménez (UAG)
- (Argentina) Lucas Lobos (UANL)
- (Mexico) Victor Mañón (Pachuca)
- (Argentina) Guillermo Marino (UANL)
- (Mexico) Alberto Medina (Guadalajara)
- (Peru) Andres Mendoza (Morelia)
- (Mexico) Ramón Morales (Guadalajara)
- (Mexico) Raúl Nava (Toluca)
- (Mexico) Edgar Pacheco (Atlas)
- (Mexico) Marco Pérez (Pachuca)
- (Mexico) Sergio Ponce (Guadalajara)
- (Mexico) Fernando Salazar (Morelia)
- (Brazil) Wilson Tiago (Morelia)
- (Paraguay) Enrique Vera (América)

== See also ==
- 2009 Copa Libertadores
- Primera División de México
