= Carlos Peña (Mexican footballer) =

Mexican footballer (born 1990)

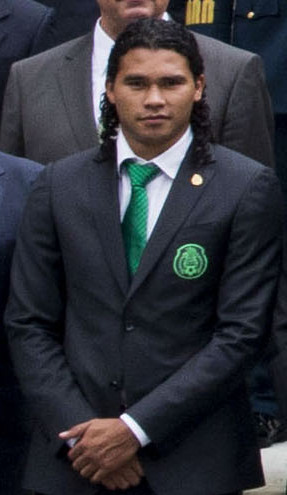
- Peña in 2014

Personal information
- Full name: Carlos Alberto Peña Rodríguez
- Date of birth: 29 March 1990 (age 36)
- Place of birth: Ciudad Victoria, Tamaulipas, Mexico
- Height: 1.78 m (5 ft 10 in)
- Position: Midfielder

Youth career
- Pachuca

Senior career*
Years	Team	Apps	(Gls)
2010–2011	Pachuca	20	(1)
2011–2013	→ León (loan)	63	(14)
2013–2015	León	89	(28)
2016–2017	Guadalajara	33	(8)
2017	→ León (loan)	17	(2)
2017–2019	Rangers	12	(4)
2018	→ Cruz Azul (loan)	8	(0)
2018	→ Necaxa (loan)	5	(0)
2019	GKS Tychy	0	(0)
2019–2020	Correcaminos	7	(0)
2020	Tiburón	0	(0)
2021	FAS	21	(4)
2021	Antigua	16	(4)
2022	Vida	2	(0)
2023	Al Dhaid	0	(0)
2023–2024	Hutteen	0	(0)
2024	Racing Los Angeles		
2025–	Gullit Academy		

International career
2012–2016	Mexico	19	(1)
- * Club domestic league appearances and goals as of 8 December 2022

Carlos Alberto Peña Rodríguez (born 29 March 1990), sometimes known as Gullit, is a Mexican professional footballer who plays as a midfielder.

== Club career ==
=== Pachuca ===
Born in Ciudad Victoria, Tamaulipas, Peña graduated from C.F. Pachuca's youth categories, and made his first-team debut on 14 April 2010, coming on as a late substitute in a 2–2 away draw against Cruz Azul. He appeared more regularly in the following campaign, playing 19 matches (13 as a starter).

=== León ===
In May 2011, Peña joined Ascenso MX side Club León. He appeared in 31 matches during his first campaign with Los Panzas Verdes, as the club was promoted from the play-offs. In 2013–14 Peña scored 12 goals, as León was crowned champions of both Apertura and Clausura tournaments (the latter by defeating his former club Pachuca).

=== Guadalajara ===
On 6 December 2015, C.D. Guadalajara announced they had signed Peña with a reported transfer fee of US$8 million. Peña scored on his official debut against Veracruz on 10 January 2016. Despite a slow start to the Clausura 2016 season, Peña scored seven goals in 17 appearances. However, he has received criticism for his missed penalties during crucial games.

==== Return to León (loan) ====
On 7 December 2016, it was announced that Peña had returned to Leon after playing a year for Guadalajara.

=== Rangers ===
On 22 June 2017, Scottish club Rangers announced the signing of Peña on a three-year contract for a fee of £3.2m. Peña scored his first Rangers goal in a 4–1 win over Dundee on 9 September. After two loan spells back in Mexico, his contract with Rangers was terminated in February 2019. Widely considered an expensive flop by the clubs fans.

=== GKS Tychy ===
In March 2019 Peña moved, to GKS Tychy.

== International career ==
In late 2012, Peña was called up by José Manuel de la Torre to play for Mexico in the World Cup Qualifiers against Guyana on 12 October and El Salvador on 16 October. He was also called up for a friendly against Peru.

Peña was named among the 23-man squad for the 2013 Gold Cup. Mexico was eventually knocked out in the semifinals by runners-up Panama, with Peña appearing in four matches during the competition. He was later called up by Víctor Manuel Vucetich to the 2014 FIFA World Cup Qualifying matches against Panama and Costa Rica. He scored his first international goal against Finland in a friendly match on 30 October 2013. Peña was named in the 23 squad men in the 2014 World Cup. He played in the final group stage match against Croatia replacing Oribe Peralta.

== Career statistics ==
=== Club ===
As of 8 December 2022

Appearances and goals by club, season and competition
Club	Season	League			Cup 1		Cup 2		Continental		Other		Total	
Club	Season	Division	Apps	Goals	Apps	Goals	Apps	Goals	Apps	Goals	Apps	Goals	Apps	Goals
Pachuca	2009–10	Liga MX	1	0	—		—		—		—		1	0
Pachuca	2010–11	Liga MX	19	1	—		—		1 (Note: Appearance in North American SuperLiga)	0	1 (Note: Appearance in FIFA Club World Cup)	0	21	1
Pachuca	Total		20	1	—		—		1	0	1	0	22	1
León (loan)	2011–12	Ascenso MX	31	6	—		—		—		—		31	6
León (loan)	2012–13	Liga MX	32	8	—		—		—		2 (Note: Appearances in Copa Libertadores)	0	34	8
León	2013–14	Liga MX	38	12	—		—		—		8	3	46	15
León	2014–15	Liga MX	32	8	—		—		1 (Note: Appearance in CONCACAF Champions League)	0	—		33	8
León	2015–16	Liga MX	19	8	6	4	—		—		—		25	12
León	Total		89	28	6	4	—		1	0	8	3	104	35
Guadalajara	2015–16	Liga MX	19	7	2	0	1	0	—		—		22	7
Guadalajara	2016–17	Liga MX	14	1	7	0	—		—		—		21	1
Guadalajara	Total		33	8	9	0	1	0	—		—		43	8
León (loan)	2016–17	Liga MX	17	2	4	1	—		—		—		21	3
Rangers	2017–18	Scottish Premiership	12	4	—		2	1	—		—		14	5
Cruz Azul (loan)	2017–18	Liga MX	8	0	2	0	—		—		—		10	0
Necaxa (loan)	2018	Liga MX	5	0	4	0	—		—		—		9	0
Correcaminos	2019–20	Ascenso MX	7	0	—		—		—		—		7	0
FAS	2020–21	Primera División de El Salvador	21	4	—		—		—		—		21	4
Antigua	2021–22	Liga Nacional de Guatemala	16	4	—		—		—		—		16	4
Vida	2022–23	Liga Nacional de Honduras	2	0	—		—		—		—		2	0
Career total			293	65	25	5	3	1	3	0	10	3	334	74

=== International ===
As of 12 June 2018

Appearances and goals by national team and year
National team	Year	Apps	Goals
Mexico	2012	1	0
Mexico	2013	10	1
Mexico	2014	6	0
Mexico	2015	0	0
Mexico	2016	2	0
Total		19	2

Scores and results list Mexico's goal tally first, score column indicates score after each Peña goal.

List of international goals scored by Carlos Peña
No.	Date	Venue	Opponent	Score	Result	Competition
1	20 November 2013	Westpac Stadium, Wellington, New Zealand	New Zealand	4–2	4–2	2014 FIFA World Cup qualification

== Honours ==
Pachuca

- CONCACAF Champions League: 2009–10
- FIFA Club World Cup fifth place: 2010

León

- Liga MX: Apertura 2013, Clausura 2014
- Ascenso MX: Clausura 2012
- Campeón de Ascenso: 2012

Guadalajara

- Copa MX runner-up: Apertura 2016
- Supercopa MX: 2016

Necaxa

- Copa MX: Clausura 2018
- Supercopa MX: 2018

FAS

- Salvadoran Primera División: Clausura 2021

Gullit Academy

- UPSL Division 1: 2025

Mexico

- CONCACAF Cup: 2015
