= Gabriel Caballero =

Mexican footballer and manager (born 1971)

Personal information
- Full name: Gabriel Esteban Caballero Schiker
- Date of birth: 5 February 1971 (age 55)
- Place of birth: Rosario, Santa Fe, Argentina
- Height: 1.74 m (5 ft 9 in)
- Positions: Midfielder; forward

Senior career*
Years	Team	Apps	(Gls)
1989–1994	Central Córdoba	99	(16)
1994–1995	Deportes Antofagasta	58	(22)
1995–1998	Santos Laguna	93	(27)
1998–2002	Pachuca	154	(28)
2002–2003	Atlas	40	(6)
2003–2004	Pachuca	46	(5)
2004–2005	Puebla	33	(3)
2005–2009	Pachuca	151	(22)
Total		674	(129)

International career
2001–2002	Mexico	8	(0)

Managerial career
- 2010–2011: Pachuca (Assistant coach)
- 2013: Pachuca
- 2015–2016: Cafetaleros
- 2016–2017: Dorados
- 2017–2018: Cafetaleros
- 2018–2020: Juárez
- 2022–2023: Mazatlán
- * Club domestic league appearances and goals

Gabriel Esteban Caballero Schiker (born 5 February 1971) is a professional football manager and former player. Born in Argentina, he played for the Mexico national team.

== Club career ==
Caballero started playing in his native Argentina's Central Córdoba in 1989, and in 1993 he transferred to Chilean Deportes Antofagasta.

In 1995, he arrived in Mexico, and has played for Mexican teams such as Santos Laguna, Pachuca, Atlas and Puebla, winning 6 championships (Santos Laguna, Pachuca), most recently with Pachuca on 27 May 2007. He announced his retirement on 18 November 2009.

== International career ==
=== Mexico national team ===
Caballero became a naturalized Mexican on 11 December 2001, and was later recruited to the national team, with whom he had the chance to play in his first World Cup in 2002, held in South Korea and Japan. Caballero appeared in all three of Mexico's first round matches, against Croatia, Ecuador, and Italy.

== Managerial career ==
After his retirement announced his new job as Assistant coach from his last club, on 14 November 2012 he was announced as the new coach of C.F. Pachuca, after the club terminated their previous coach Hugo Sanchez.

== Honours ==
=== Player ===
Santos Laguna

- Mexican Primera División: Invierno 1996

Pachuca

- Mexican Primera División: Invierno 1999, Invierno 2001, Apertura 2003, Clausura 2006, Clausura 2007
- CONCACAF Champions' Cup: 2007, 2008
- Copa Sudamericana: 2006
- North American SuperLiga: 2007

Individual

- Primera División Chilena Top Scorer: 1995
- Mexican Primera División Top Scorer (Shared): Verano 1997

=== Manager ===
Dorados

- Ascenso MX: Apertura 2016

Cafetaleros

- Ascenso MX: Clausura 2018
