= 2008 CONCACAF Champions' Cup =

43rd edition of premier club football tournament organized by CONCACAF

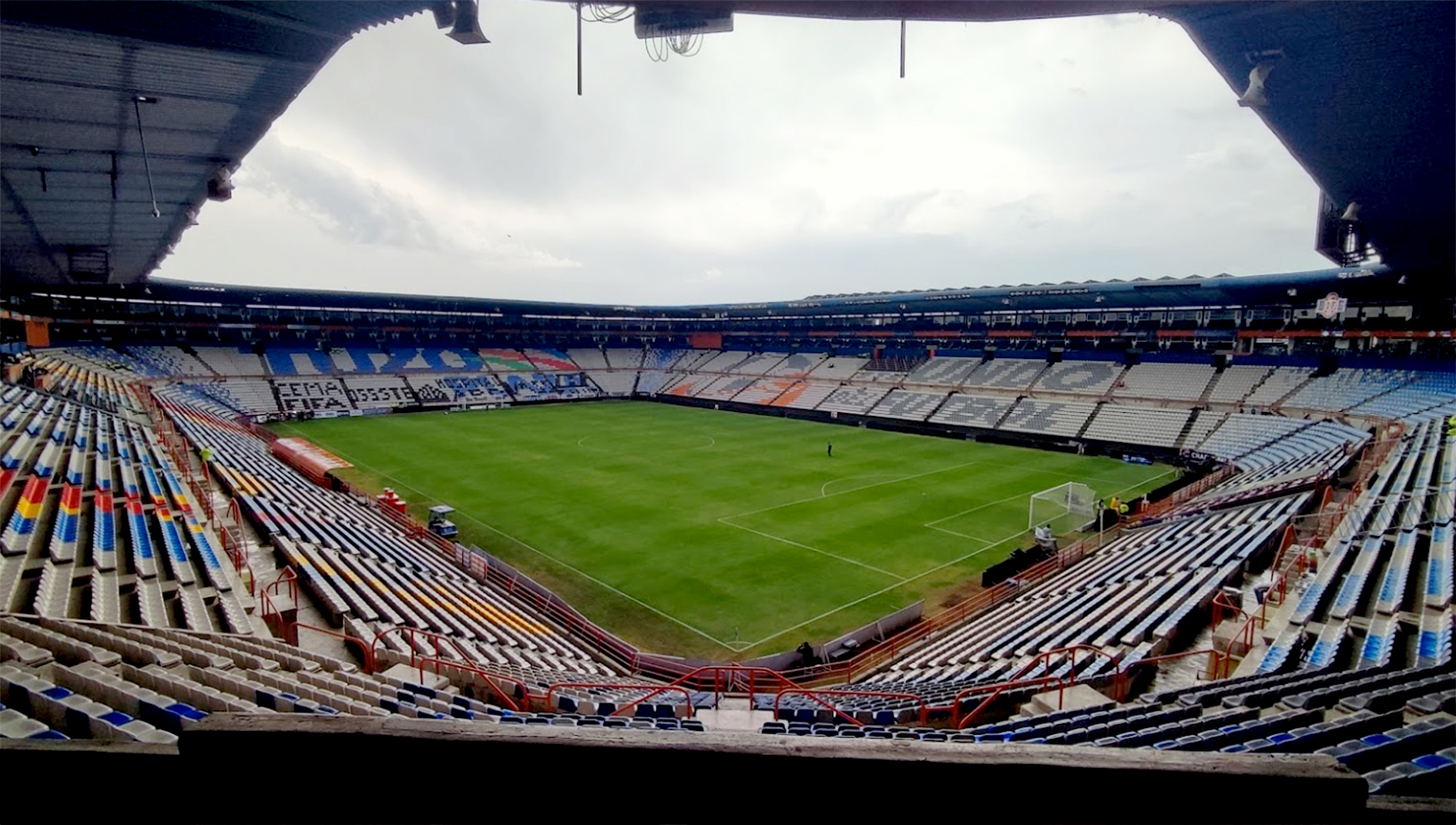
- Estadio Hidalgo in Pachuca hosted the second leg Final

Tournament details
- Dates: March 11 – April 30
- Teams: 8 (from 6 associations)

Final positions
- Champions: (Mexico) Pachuca (3rd title)
- Runners-up: (Costa Rica) Saprissa

Tournament statistics
- Matches played: 14
- Goals scored: 34 (2.43 per match)
- Attendance: 291,563 (20,826 per match)
- Top scorer(s): (Mexico) Luis Montes (United States) Devon McTavish (3 goals each)

The 2008 CONCACAF Champions' Cup was the 43rd edition of the annual international club football competition held in the CONCACAF region (North America, Central America and the Caribbean), the CONCACAF Champions' Cup. It was the final edition under this name and format, being replaced by the CONCACAF Champions League starting from the 2008–09 season (before being renamed again in 2023).

It determined that year's club champion of association football in the CONCACAF region. The tournament was also a qualifying event for the 2008 FIFA Club World Cup.

CONCACAF held the draw on December 18, 2007, to establish the matchups and bracket.

To date, this is the last time a team from Central America advanced to the final, as all future finals under the Champions League or Champions Cup format have only featured Mexican (Primera and Liga MX) or MLS teams.

== Qualified teams ==
=== North American zone ===
(Mexico) Pachuca – 2007 Clausura champion
(Mexico) Atlante – 2007 Apertura champion
(United States) Houston Dynamo – 2007 MLS Cup champion
(United States) D.C. United – 2007 MLS Supporters' Shield winner

=== Central American zone ===
(Honduras) Motagua – 2007 UNCAF Interclub Cup winners
(Costa Rica) Saprissa – 2007 UNCAF Interclub Cup runner-up
(Guatemala) Municipal – 2007 UNCAF Interclub Cup third place

=== Caribbean zone ===
(Jamaica) Harbour View – 2007 CFU Club Championship winner

== Bracket ==
Quarterfinals
(Guatemala) Municipal	0	1	1
(United States) Houston Dynamo	0	3	3
(Mexico) Atlante	2	0	2
(Costa Rica) Saprissa	1	3	4
(Honduras) Motagua	0	0	0
(Mexico) Pachuca	0	1	1
(Jamaica) Harbour View	1	0	1
(United States) D.C. United	1	5	6

Semifinals
(United States) Houston Dynamo	0	0	0
(Costa Rica) Saprissa	0	3	3
(Mexico) Pachuca	2	1	3
(United States) D.C. United	0	2	2

Final
(Costa Rica) Saprissa	1	1	2
(Mexico) Pachuca	1	2	3

== Quarterfinals ==
March 12, 2008
20:10 CT

Municipal (Guatemala)	0–0	(United States) Houston Dynamo
	(Report)

Estadio Mateo Flores
Guatemala City, Guatemala
Attendance: 22,250
Referee: Edgar Rodriguez (Costa Rica)
March 19, 2008
19:40 CT

Houston Dynamo (United States)	3–1	(Guatemala) Municipal
De Rosario 47', 69' (pen.); Wondolowski 75'	(Report)	Ramírez 86' (pen.)

Robertson Stadium
Houston, United States
Attendance: 14,348
Referee: Mauricio Mejia (México)

Houston Dynamo won 3–1 on aggregate.

March 13, 2008
21:05 CT

Atlante (Mexico)	2–1	(Costa Rica) Saprissa
Pereyra 40'; Bermúdez 70'	(Report)	Centeno 27'

Estadio Quintana Roo
Cancún, Mexico
Attendance: 21,897
Referee: Carlos Batres (Guatemala)
March 20, 2008
20:10 CT

Saprissa (Costa Rica)	3–0	(Mexico) Atlante
Muñoz 18' (o.g.); Alonso 40'; Castillo 67' (o.g.)	(Report)

Estadio Ricardo Saprissa
San Juan de Tibás, Costa Rica
Attendance: 23,000
Referee: Alex Prus (United States)

Saprissa won 4–2 on aggregate.

March 11, 2008
18:15 CT

Motagua (Honduras)	0–0	(Mexico) Pachuca
	(Report)

Estadio Tiburcio Carías Andino
Tegucigalpa, Honduras
Attendance: 35,846
Referee: Elmar Rodas (Guatemala)
March 19, 2008
21:10 CT

Pachuca (Mexico)	1–0	(Honduras) Motagua
Montes 43'	(Report)

Estadio Hidalgo
Pachuca, Mexico
Attendance: 33,000
Referee: Ricardo Salazar (United States)

Pachuca won 1–0 on aggregate.

March 12, 2008
19:10 CT

Harbour View (Jamaica)	1–1	(United States) D.C. United
Palmer 85'	(Report)	McTavish 45+'

Harbour View Stadium
Kingston, Jamaica
Attendance: 6,985
Referee: Philip Jordan (Trinidad and Tobago)
March 18, 2008
18:40 CT

D.C. United (United States)	5–0	(Jamaica) Harbour View
McTavish 26', 68'; Emilio 63', 66'; Fred 88'	(Report)

RFK Stadium
Washington, D.C., United States
Attendance: 12,394
Referee: German Arredondo (México)

D.C. United won 6–1 on aggregate.

== Semifinals ==
April 2, 2008
22:06 ET

Houston Dynamo (United States)	0–0	(Costa Rica) Saprissa
	(Report)

Robertson Stadium
Houston, United States
Attendance: 10,260
Referee: Courtney Campbell (Jamaica)
April 9, 2008
22:10 ET

Saprissa (Costa Rica)	3–0	(United States) Houston Dynamo
Alonso 33'; Borges 49'; Arrieta 76'	(Report)

Estadio Ricardo Saprissa
San Juan de Tibás, Costa Rica
Attendance: 23,112
Referee: Marco Antonio Rodríguez (Mexico)

Saprissa won 3–0 on aggregate.

April 1, 2008
22:10 ET

Pachuca (Mexico)	2–0	(United States) D.C. United
Montes 63', 81'	(Report)

Estadio Hidalgo
Pachuca, Mexico
Attendance: 18,642
Referee: Roberto Moreno (Panama)
April 9, 2008
19:40 ET

D.C. United (United States)	2–1	(Mexico) Pachuca
Dyachenko 85'; Niell 90'	(Report)	Álvarez 76'

RFK Stadium
Washington, D.C., United States
Attendance: 17,329
Referee: Joel Aguilar (El Salvador)

Pachuca won 3–2 on aggregate.

== Final ==
=== First leg ===
2008 CONCACAF Champions' Cup
April 23, 2008
20:30 CT
First leg

Saprissa (Costa Rica)	1–1	(Mexico) Pachuca
Cordero 89'	Report	Rey 47'

Estadio Ricardo Saprissa, San Juan de Tibás
Attendance: 22,500
Referee: Carlos Batres (Guatemala)

=== Second leg ===
April 30, 2008
20:30 CT
Second leg

Pachuca (Mexico)	2–1	(Costa Rica) Saprissa
Gimenez 3'; Rey 53'	Report	Arrieta 90+3'

Estadio Hidalgo, Pachuca
Attendance: 30,000
Referee: Mauricio Navarro (Canada)

Team details

Pachuca
Saprissa

GK	1	(Colombia) Miguel Calero
DF	21	(Mexico) Fausto Pinto
DF	2	(Mexico) Leobardo López
DF	3	(Paraguay) Julio Manzur
DF	16	(Mexico) Gerardo Rodríguez
MF	14	(Mexico) Marvin Cabrera
MF	8	(Argentina) (Mexico) Gabriel Caballero
MF	6	(Mexico) Jaime Correa
MF	19	(Argentina) Christian Giménez	(substituted off) 78'
FW	7	(Argentina) (Mexico) Damián Álvarez	(substituted off) 64'
FW	18	(Colombia) Luis Rey	(substituted off) 82'
Substitutions:
DF	13	(Mexico) Fernando Salazar	(substituted in) 64'
MF	10	(Colombia) Andrés Chitiva	(substituted in) 78'
FW	11	(Mexico) Juan Carlos Cacho	(substituted in) 82'
Manager:
(Mexico) Enrique Meza

GK	1	(Costa Rica) Keylor Navas
DF	3	(Costa Rica) Víctor Cordero
DF	18	(Costa Rica) Jervis Drummond
DF	16	(Costa Rica) Gabriel Badilla	Booked
DF	14	(Costa Rica) Andrés Núñez
MF	31	(Costa Rica) Michael Barrantes
MF	17	(Costa Rica) José Luis López	(substituted off) 65'
MF	20	(Costa Rica) Celso Borges
MF	21	(Costa Rica) Armando Alonso	(substituted off) 49'
FW	23	(Costa Rica) Try Bennett	(substituted off) 56'
FW	11	(Costa Rica) Ronald Gómez	Booked
Substitutions:
FW	7	(Costa Rica) Alejandro Alpízar	(substituted in) 49' (yellow card)
FW	19	(Costa Rica) Jairo Arrieta	(substituted in) 56'
FW	9	(Costa Rica) Pablo Brenes	(substituted in) 65' (yellow card)
Manager:
(Costa Rica) Jeaustin Campos

Pachuca won the 2008 CONCACAF Champions' Cup 3–2 on aggregate, advanced to the 2008 FIFA Club World Cup.

== Champion ==
CONCACAF Champions' Cup
2008 winners

Pachuca
Third title

== Top scorers ==
Rank	Player	Club	Goals
1	(United States) Devon McTavish	(United States) D.C. United	3
1	(Mexico) Luis Montes	(Mexico) Pachuca	3
3	(Costa Rica) Jairo Arrieta	(Costa Rica) Saprissa	2
3	(Costa Rica) Armando Alonso	(Costa Rica) Saprissa	2
3	(Canada) Dwayne DeRosario	(United States) Houston Dynamo	2
3	(Brazil) Luciano Emilio	(United States) D.C. United	2
3	(Colombia) Luis Gabriel Rey	(Mexico) Pachuca	2
