= Ginebra, Valle del Cauca =

Ginebra
- Municipality and town
- Flag Coat of arms

- Location of the municipality and town of Ginebra, Valle del Cauca, in the Valle del Cauca Department of Colombia

- Location in Colombia
- Coordinates: 3°45′N 76°10′W
- Country: Colombia
- Department: Valle del Cauca Department

Area
  - Total: 313 km^{2} (121 sq mi)

Population (2015)
  - Total: 21,055
- Time zone: UTC-5 (Colombia Standard Time)
- Website: https://www.ginebra-valle.gov.co

Ginebra is a town and municipality located in the Department of Valle del Cauca, Colombia.
