= 2007 CONCACAF Champions' Cup =

42nd edition of premier club football tournament organized by CONCACAF

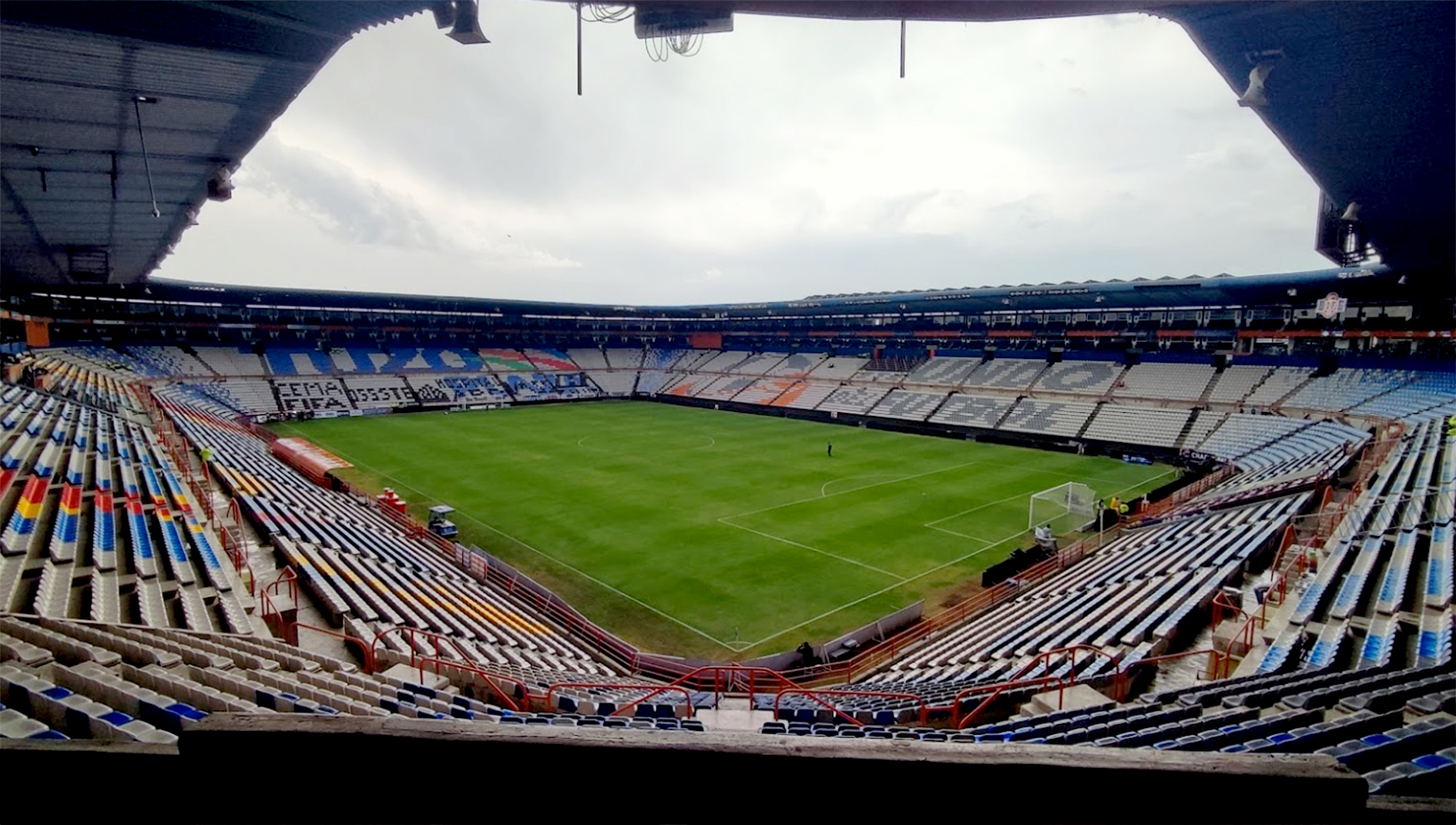
- Estadio Hidalgo in Pachuca hosted the second leg Final

Tournament details
- Dates: 22 February – 25 April
- Teams: 8 (from 6 associations)

Final positions
- Champions: (Mexico) Pachuca (2nd title)
- Runners-up: (Mexico) Guadalajara

Tournament statistics
- Matches played: 14
- Goals scored: 38 (2.71 per match)
- Top scorer(s): (Mexico) Omar Bravo (Brazil) Luciano Emilio (4 goals each)

The 2007 CONCACAF Champions' Cup was the 42nd edition of the annual international club football competition held in the CONCACAF region (North America, Central America and the Caribbean), the CONCACAF Champions' Cup. It determined that year's club champion of association football in the CONCACAF region. The tournament also served as a qualifying event for the 2007 FIFA Club World Cup.

Pachuca won the Champions' Cup, defeating Guadalajara 7–6 on penalties following a 2–2 aggregate draw.

In addition, as runners-up, Guadalajara was invited to CONMEBOL's 2007 Copa Sudamericana.

== Qualified teams ==
=== North American zone ===
(Mexico) Pachuca – 2006 Clausura champion
(Mexico) Guadalajara – 2006 Apertura champion
(United States) Houston Dynamo – 2006 MLS Cup champion
(United States) D.C. United – 2006 MLS Supporters' Shield winner

=== Central America zone ===
(Costa Rica) Puntarenas – UNCAF champion
(Honduras) Olimpia – UNCAF runner-up
(Guatemala) Marquense – UNCAF third place

=== Caribbean zone ===
(Trinidad and Tobago) W Connection – 2006 CFU Club Championship winner

== Bracket ==
Quarterfinals
(Honduras)	Olimpia	1	2	3
(United States)	D.C. United	4	3	7
(Trinidad and Tobago)	W Connection	2	0	2
(Mexico)	Guadalajara	1	3	4
(Costa Rica)	Puntarenas	1	0	1
(United States)	Houston Dynamo	0	2	2
(Mexico)	Pachuca	2	1	3
(Guatemala)	Marquense	0	0	0

Semifinals
(United States)	D.C. United	1	1	2
(Mexico)	Guadalajara	1	2	3
(United States)	Houston Dynamo	2	2	4
(Mexico)	Pachuca (a.e.t.)	0	5	5

Final
(Mexico)	Guadalajara	2	0	2 (6)
(Mexico)	Pachuca (a.e.t.) (pen.)	2	0	2 (7)

== Quarterfinals ==
22 February 2007
20:05 CT

Pachuca (Mexico)	2–0	(Guatemala) Marquense
Álvarez 13'; Caballero 58'

Estadio Hidalgo
Pachuca, Mexico
Referee: Edgar Rodriguez (Costa Rica)
28 February 2007
18:15 CT

Marquense (Guatemala)	0–1	(Mexico) Pachuca
		Landín 17'

Estadio Marquesa de la Ensenada
San Marcos, Guatemala
Attendance: 5,720
Referee: Ricardo Zelaya (Honduras)

Pachuca won 3–0 on aggregate.

21 February 2007
13:35 CT

Puntarenas (Costa Rica)	1–0	(United States) Houston Dynamo
Bernard 90+2'

Estadio Lito Pérez
Puntarenas, Costa Rica
Referee: German Arredondo (Mexico)
1 March 2007
20:05 CT

Houston Dynamo (United States)	2–0	(Costa Rica) Puntarenas
Dalglish 27'; Gray 74'

Aggie Soccer Stadium
College Station, United States
Attendance: 4,286
Referee: Armando Archundia (Mexico)

Houston Dynamo won 2–1 on aggregate.

13 February 2007
20:05 ET

W Connection (Trinidad and Tobago)	2–1	(Mexico) Guadalajara
Jean 79'; Seabra 86'		Bravo 61'

Manny Ramjohn Stadium
Marabella, Trinidad and Tobago
Attendance: 4,000
Referee: Courtney Campbell (Jamaica)
28 February 2007
20:45 CT

Guadalajara (Mexico)	3–0	(Trinidad and Tobago) W Connection
Santana 21', 46'; Bautista 74'	Report

Estadio Jalisco
Guadalajara, Mexico
Attendance: 30,000
Referee: Jose Pineda (Honduras)

Guadalajara won 4–2 on aggregate.

21 February 2007
20:00 CT

Olimpia (Honduras)	1–4	(United States) D.C. United
Cárcamo 34'		Gómez 31', 59'; Emilio 45'; Erpen 84'

Estadio Tiburcio Carías Andino
Tegucigalpa, Honduras
Referee: Jorge Gasso (Mexico)
1 March 2007
19:05 ET

D.C. United (United States)	3–2	(Honduras) Olimpia
Emilio 37', 84'; Gómez 49' (pen.)	Report	Thomas 30' (pen.); Pacini 75'

RFK Stadium
Washington, D.C., United States
Attendance: 8,181
Referee: Mauricio Navarro (Canada)

D.C. United won 7–3 on aggregate.

== Semifinals ==
15 March 2007
19:30 CT

Houston Dynamo (United States)	2–0	(Mexico) Pachuca
Ching 57'; Wondolowski 84'	Report

Robertson Stadium
Houston, United States
Attendance: 13,007
Referee: Neal Brizan (Trinidad and Tobago)

Note: The first leg match scheduled for 14 March 2007 was postponed due to a weather-induced power outage.

5 April 2007
18:35 CT

Pachuca (Mexico)	5–2 (a.e.t.)	(United States) Houston Dynamo
Caballero 4', 86'; Giménez 15' (pen.), 58' (pen.), 105'	Report	Mullan 53'; Ching 79'

Estadio Hidalgo
Pachuca, Mexico
Attendance: 30,000
Referee: Mauricio Navarro (Canada)

Pachuca won 5–4 on aggregate.

15 March 2007
20:00 ET

D.C. United (United States)	1–1	(Mexico) Guadalajara
Emilio 90+1'	Report	Bravo 63'

RFK Stadium
Washington, D.C., United States
Attendance: 26,528
Referee: Silviu Petrescu (Canada)
3 April 2007
20:30 CT

Guadalajara (Mexico)	2–1	(United States) D.C. United
Bautista 42'; Pineda 52'	Report	Moreno 36'

Estadio Jalisco
Guadalajara, Mexico
Attendance: 30,000
Referee: Roberto Moreno (Panama)

Guadalajara won 3–2 on aggregate.

== Final ==
=== First leg ===
2007 CONCACAF Champions' Cup Final
18 April 2007
First leg

Guadalajara (Mexico)	2–2	(Mexico) Pachuca
Bravo 43', 66'		Cacho 21'; Cabrera 82'

Estadio Jalisco, Guadalajara
Attendance: 40,000
Referee: Germán Arredondo

=== Second leg ===
2007 CONCACAF Champions' Cup Final
25 April 2007
First leg

Pachuca (Mexico)	0–0 (a.e.t.)	(Mexico) Guadalajara
	Report 1 Report 2
Penalties
Giménez (penalty scored); Chitiva (penalty scored); Salazar (penalty scored); Álvarez (penalty scored); Rodríguez (penalty scored); López (penalty scored); Landín (penalty scored)	7–6	(penalty scored) Bravo; (penalty scored) Pineda; (penalty scored) Martínez; (penalty scored) Esparza; (penalty scored) Mejía; (penalty scored) Magallon; (penalty missed) Medina

Estadio Hidalgo, Pachuca
Attendance: 30,000
Referee: Armando Archundia

Team details

Pachuca
Guadalajara

GK	1	(Colombia) Miguel Calero
DF	14	(Mexico) Marvin Cabrera
DF	3	(Colombia) Aquivaldo Mosquera
DF	21	(Mexico) Fausto Pinto	Booked
DF	16	(Mexico) Gerardo Rodríguez
MF	8	(Argentina) (Mexico) Gabriel Caballero
MF	6	(Mexico) Jaime Correa
MF	10	(Colombia) Andrés Chitiva
FW	2	(Mexico) Leobardo López
FW	19	(Argentina) Christian Giménez
FW	11	(Mexico) Juan Carlos Cacho
Substitutions:
MF	7	(Argentina) Damián Álvarez	Substituted on
Manager:
(Mexico) Enrique Meza

GK
DF
DF
DF
DF
MF
MF
MF
MF
FW
FW
Substitutions:
Manager:
(Mexico) José Manuel de la Torre

2–2 on aggregate. Pachuca won 2007 CONCACAF Champions' Cup 7–6 on penalties, advanced to 2007 FIFA Club World Cup.

== Champions ==
CONCACAF Champions' Cup
2007 Winners

Pachuca
Second Title

== Top scorers ==
Rank	Player	Club	Goals
1	(Brazil) Luciano Emilio	(United States) D.C. United	4
1	(Mexico) Omar Bravo	(Mexico) Guadalajara	4
3	(Argentina) Christian Giménez	(Mexico) Pachuca	3
3	(Argentina) Christian Gómez	(United States) D.C. United	3
5	(Mexico) Adolfo Bautista	(Mexico) Guadalajara	2
5	(United States) Brian Ching	(United States) Houston Dynamo	2
5	(Argentina) Gabriel Caballero	(Mexico) Pachuca	2
5	(Mexico) Marvin Cabrera	(Mexico) Pachuca	2
5	(Mexico) Sergio Santana	(Mexico) Guadalajara	2

== Notes ==
- C.F. Pachuca advances to 2007 FIFA Club World Cup as champion.
- Guadalajara advances to 2007 Copa Sudamericana as runner-up.
- D.C. United advances to 2007 Copa Sudamericana by finishing third place
  (total goal difference +3 vs. Houston Dynamo 0) as the non-Mexico representative from CONCACAF.
