= Juan Carlos Rojas (footballer) =

Mexican footballer (born 1984)

Personal information
- Full name: Juan Carlos Rojas Guerra
- Date of birth: 6 June 1984 (age 42)
- Place of birth: Romita, Guanajuato, Mexico
- Height: 1.76 m (5 ft 9 in)
- Position: Right-back

Senior career*
Years	Team	Apps	(Gls)
2004–2008	León	133	(6)
2008–2013	Pachuca	95	(1)
2012–2013	→ León (loan)	21	(0)
2014–2015	Chiapas	2	(0)
2015–	→ FC Juárez (loan)	26	(0)
- * Club domestic league appearances and goals as of 7 July 2017

Juan Carlos Rojas Guerra (Note: In this Spanish name, the first or paternal surname is Rojas and the second or maternal family name is Guerra.) (born 6 June 1984) is a Mexican professional footballer who plays as a right-back.

Rojas played a bulk of his professional career with Club León in the Primera Division A. He eventually made his way onto the big stage with Pachuca for the Apertura 2008 tournament.

He is known to teammates and fans as "Romita" for his birthplace.

== Honours ==
=== Club ===
León:

- Primera División A: Clausura 2008

FC Juárez:

- Ascenso MX: Apertura 2015

Pachuca

- CONCACAF Champions Cup: 2008, 2010
