= Raúl Martínez (footballer, born 1987) =

Mexican footballer (born 1987)

Personal information
- Full name: Raúl Ascención Martínez Rodríguez
- Date of birth: 1 April 1987 (age 39)
- Place of birth: Xochitlán, Hidalgo, Mexico
- Height: 1.72 m (5 ft 8 in)
- Position: Midfielder

Senior career*
Years	Team	Apps	(Gls)
2004–2008	Pachuca Juniors	55	(2)
2005–2007	→ Indios de Ciudad Juarez (loan)	39	(1)
2007	Pachuca	13	(0)
2012	→ Club León (loan)	0	(0)
2012–2014	Lobos de la BUAP	0	(0)
2014–2015	Global FC	1	(0)
2015	Murciélagos	3	(0)

International career
2007	Mexico U23	5	(0)
- * Club domestic league appearances and goals

Raúl Ascención Martínez Rodríguez (Note: In this Spanish name, the first or paternal surname is Martínez and the second or maternal family name is Rodríguez.) (born 1 April 1987) is a Mexican former professional footballer who played as a midfielder.

== Early life ==
Martínez was born in Xochitlán and joined the youth academy of C.F. Pachuca.

== Club career ==
Martínez started his career with Pachuca Juniors, where he made over forty-four league appearances. He made his professional debut on 30 July 2005, during a 2–1 win over CF Monterrey. After that, he played for Indios de Ciudad Juarez, Club León, and Lobos de la BUAP before signing for Global FC on a three-month contract.

== International career ==
Martínez was also capped from Mexico at the U-23 level during the 2007 Pan American Games.

== Post-playing career ==
In 2022, he was appointed sports director of the municipality of Progreso de Obregón.

== Style of play ==
Martínez can operate as a defensive midfielder.

== Personal life ==
Martínez has been married and has a son, who was born in 2008.
