= Damián Álvarez (footballer, born 1979) =

Mexican footballer

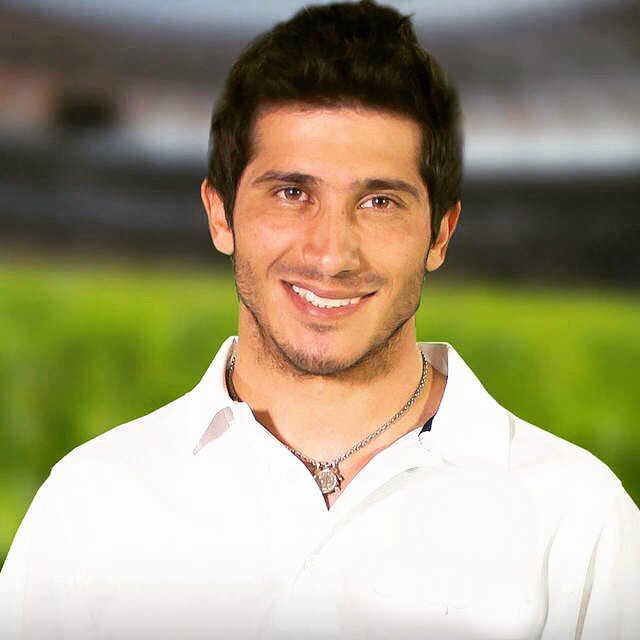

Personal information
- Full name: Damián Ariel Álvarez
- Date of birth: 21 May 1979 (age 47)
- Place of birth: Morón, Buenos Aires, Argentina
- Height: 1.65 m (5 ft 5 in)
- Position: Winger

Youth career
- River Plate

Senior career*
Years	Team	Apps	(Gls)
1998–2001	River Plate	54	(9)
2001	Reggina	5	(0)
2002	River Plate	6	(1)
2003–2006	Morelia	118	(23)
2006–2010	Pachuca	140	(22)
2010–2017	Tigres UANL	215	(23)
Total		538	(78)

International career
2012–2013	Mexico	2	(0)
- * Club domestic league appearances and goals

Damián Ariel Álvarez (born 21 May 1979), also known as "La Chilindrina", is a former professional footballer who played as a winger. Born in Argentina, he played for the Mexico national team.

== Club career ==
Álvarez made his professional debut in Argentina for River Plate in 1998. In 2002, he moved to Serie B to play for Reggina. However, he returned to the Americas a year later, joining Morelia of the Liga MX. Álvarez played a significant role for the team that season, playing in 16 games, 13 starts, and scoring three goals and helped them reach the league final but lost to Monterrey. He remained a consistent starter for the team and started a total of 60 games for the team, scoring nine goals.

He moved to Pachuca, earning six championships with the team: one Copa Sudamericana, three CONCACAF Champions' Cup, one SuperLiga, and the Mexican Clausura 2007. Álvarez has been a significant member in every championship.

=== Tigres UANL ===
In the 2010 draft of the Liga MX, Álvarez was bought by Tigres UANL in a high-profile transfer. A starter under Ricardo Ferretti, he became a key in the team's offensive for the Apertura 2011 Championship. He scored the goal of the 1–0 victory in the first leg of the finals against Santos Laguna. Tigres won the Liga MX Championship for the third time after 29 years. Álvarez, along with Danilinho, Héctor Mancilla and Lucas Lobos in the attack, became the so-called "Cuatro Fantásticos" ("Fantastic Four") of the Liga MX.

On December 14, 2014, he received a red card along with teammates Hernán Burbano and Nahuel Guzmán in the Apertura 2014 final against Club América. Álvarez and his team lost 3–0 in the final at the Estadio Azteca. Álvarez was a regular starter in the 2015 Copa Libertadores. In the group stage, Tigres played against his former team River Plate and scored the second goal of the 2–2 draw in the home game. Tigres would eventually reached to the finals and lose to River Plate.

Álvarez played an important role in the playoffs of the Apertura 2015 Championship. Damián, who in the regular season played a substitute role, scored one goal in quarterfinals against Chiapas and one more in semifinals against Toluca. Tigres became champions defeating Pumas UNAM.

He came in as substitute of Javier Aquino in the second half of the Apertura 2016 finals against Club América. Álvarez started the play that dramatically tied the game in overtime, by crossing to Jürgen Damm, who then re-crossed to Jesús Dueñas, that finally scored a header at the 119'. Tigres beat América in penalty shoot-out.

With very few minutes in the Apertura 2017 season, a 38-year old Álvarez officially retired from his playing career after Tigres beat archrival CF Monterrey in the first and only League final between the two. After his retirement, Álvarez became an instant idol among fans, and is considered, along with names such as Tomás Boy, Gerónimo Barbadillo, Claudio Núñez, Walter Gaitán and Lucas Lobos, as one of the most emblematic players of Tigres.

== International career ==
In 2012, Álvarez became a naturalized Mexican citizen, having settled in Mexico in 2003. He was called up to Mexico national team on 23 February for a friendly against Colombia; Mexico lost 2–0.

== Honours ==
River Plate

- Argentine Primera División: 1999 Apertura, 2000 Clausura

Pachuca

- Liga MX: Clausura 2007
- CONCACAF Champions League: 2007, 2008, 2009–10
- SuperLiga: 2007
- Copa Sudamericana: 2006

Tigres UANL

- Liga MX: Apertura 2011, Apertura 2015, Apertura 2016, Apertura 2017
- Copa MX: Clausura 2014
- Campeón de Campeones: 2016, 2017
