= Mauro Cejas =

Argentine-Mexican footballer (born 1985)

Personal information
- Full name: Mauro Emiliano Cejas
- Date of birth: 24 August 1985 (age 41)
- Place of birth: Adrogué, Argentina
- Height: 1.75 m (5 ft 9 in)
- Position: Attacking midfielder

Senior career*
Years	Team	Apps	(Gls)
2003–2005	Temperley	110	(8)
2005–2007	Newell's Old Boys	50	(3)
2007–2011	Tecos UAG	90	(26)
2008	→ Monterrey (loan)	8	(0)
2011–2012	Pachuca	43	(9)
2013–2017	Santos Laguna	42	(7)
2015	→ Morelia (loan)	22	(4)
2016	→ Puebla (loan)	9	(0)
2017	Unión de Santa Fe	10	(0)
2018–2019	Racing de Córdoba	4	(0)
2017	Sarmiento de Humboldt		(0)
- * Club domestic league appearances and goals

Mauro Emiliano Cejas (born 24 August 1985), commonly known as Pitu, is an Argentine former professional footballer who played as an attacking midfielder.

== Career ==
On 8 December 2014, Monarcas Morelia announced that they had reached an agreement with Club Santos Laguna for the loan of Cejas in a season-long loan deal. On 25 November 2015, Morelia announced via Twitter that El Pitu's loan had ended, that same day, Cejas appeared on Santos Laguna transferred players for the next season.

He played for Unión de Santa Fe.

== Personal life ==
Cejas also holds Mexican citizenship.

== Honours ==
Santos Laguna

- Copa MX: Apertura 2014
