= Edy Brambila =

Mexican footballer (born 1986)

Personal information
- Full name: Edy Germán Brambila Rosales
- Date of birth: 15 January 1986 (age 40)
- Place of birth: Tepic, Nayarit, Mexico
- Height: 1.71 m (5 ft 7 in)
- Position: Midfielder

Youth career
- Pachuca

Senior career*
Years	Team	Apps	(Gls)
2006–2012	Pachuca	89	(3)
2011	→ León (loan)	6	(1)
2012–2017	Toluca	47	(4)
2014–2015	→ Atlas (loan)	26	(4)
2017–2018	→ Tapachula (loan)	53	(5)
2018–2020	Juárez	42	(3)
- * Club domestic league appearances and goals

Edy Germán Brambila Rosales (Note: In this Spanish name, the first or paternal surname is Brambila and the second or maternal family name is Rosales.) (born 15 January 1986) is a Mexican former professional footballer who played as a midfielder.

== Honours ==
Pachuca

- Mexican Championship: Clausura 2006
- CONCACAF Champions' Cup: 2007, 2008
- CONCACAF Champions League: 2009–10

Tapachula

- Ascenso MX: Clausura 2018
