= Leobardo López =

Mexican footballer (born 1983)

Personal information
- Full name: Leobardo López García
- Date of birth: 4 September 1983 (age 43)
- Place of birth: Coeneo, Michoacán, Mexico
- Height: 1.79 m (5 ft 10 in)
- Position: Centre-back

Senior career*
| Years | Team | Apps | (Gls) |
| 2003 | La Piedad | | |
| 2003–2004 | Unión de Curtidores | | |
| 2004–2005 | León | 35 | (5) |
| 2005 | Indios | 11 | (0) |
| 2006–2012 | Pachuca | 221 | (17) |
| 2013–2014 | Monterrey | 33 | (2) |
| 2014–2018 | Veracruz | 101 | (9) |
| 2017–2018 | → Celaya (loan) | 40 | (2) |
| 2018 | → Necaxa (loan) | 11 | (0) |
| 2019 | Zacatepec | 11 | (1) |
| 2019 | Veracruz | 16 | (0) |
| 2020–2023 | Celaya | 109 | (4) |
| 2024 | Morelia | 13 | (0) |

International career
| 2008–2010 | Mexico | 9 | (1) |
- * Club domestic league appearances and goals

Leobardo López García (born 4 September 1983) is a Mexican former professional footballer who played as a centre-back.

He received first cap at the friendly match against China on 16 April 2008. He scored his first goal with Mexico against Ecuador and also added an assist to the winning goal, the result was 2–1.

== Honours ==
Pachuca

- Mexican Primera División: Clausura 2007
- CONCACAF Champions' Cup: 2007, 2008
- Copa Sudamericana: 2006
- North American SuperLiga: 2007

Monterrey

- CONCACAF Champions League: 2012–13

Veracruz

- Copa MX: Clausura 2016

Necaxa

- Supercopa MX: 2018

== Career statistics ==
=== International ===
As of match played 8 September 2010

| National team | Year | Apps | Goals |
|---|---|---|---|
| Mexico | 2008 | 3 | 1 |
| Mexico | 2009 | 4 | 0 |
| Mexico | 2010 | 2 | 0 |
| Total | | 9 | 1 |

=== International goals ===
| No. | Date | Venue | Opponent | Score | Result | Competition | Ref. |
|---|---|---|---|---|---|---|---|
| 1. | 12 November 2008 | Phoenix, United States | Ecuador | 2–1 | Win | Friendly | |
