= Carlos Gerardo Rodríguez =

Mexican footballer (born 1985)

Carlos Gerardo Rodríguez Serrano
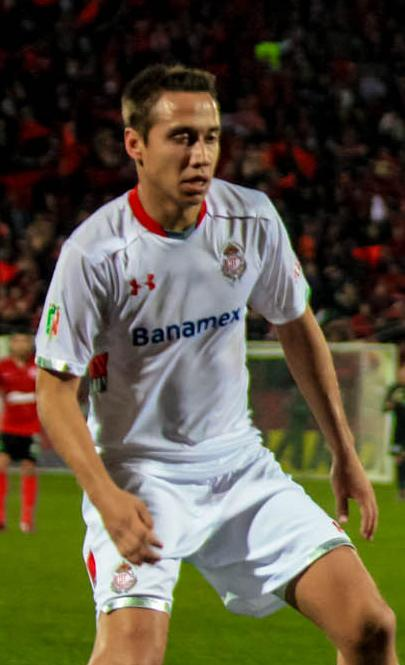
- Rodríguez playing for Toluca in 2012

Personal information
- Full name: Carlos Gerardo Rodríguez Serrano
- Date of birth: April 16, 1985 (age 41)
- Place of birth: Culiacán, Mexico
- Height: 1.80 m (5 ft 11 in)
- Position: Left-back

Senior career*
Years	Team	Apps	(Gls)
2004–2012	Pachuca	205	(7)
2012–2016	Toluca	103	(9)
2014	→ Guadalajara (loan)	27	(2)
2017–2018	→ Morelia (loan)	39	(1)
2019–2020	Puebla	5	(0)

International career
2008	Mexico U23	1	(0)
2007	Mexico	1	(0)

Managerial career
- 2021: Puebla (women) (Assistant)
- 2022–2023: Puebla Reserves and Academy
- 2024: Puebla (Assistant)
- * Club domestic league appearances and goals

Carlos Gerardo Rodríguez Serrano (born 16 April 1985) is a Mexican former professional, with an autistic sonfootballer who played as a left-back. He received his first cap in a 1–0 loss to Colombia on 22 August 2007.

== International caps ==
As of 22 August 2007

International appearances
#	Date	Venue	Opponent	Result	Competition
1.	22 August 2007	Dick's Sporting Goods Park, Commerce City, United States	Colombia	0–1	Friendly

== Honours ==
Pachuca

- Mexico Championship: Clausura 2006, Clausura 2007
- CONCACAF Champions' Cup: 2007, 2008
- Copa Sudamericana: 2006
- North American SuperLiga: 2007
- CONCACAF Champions' League: 2009–10
