= 2007 North American SuperLiga =

SuperLiga 2007

Tournament details
- Host country: United States
- Dates: July 24 – August 29
- Teams: 8 (from 1 confederation)
- Venues: 7 (in 7 host cities)

Final positions
- Champions: (Mexico) Pachuca
- Runners-up: (United States) LA Galaxy

Tournament statistics
- Matches played: 15
- Goals scored: 42 (2.8 per match)
- Attendance: 234,751 (15,650 per match)
- Top scorer: (United States) Landon Donovan (4 goals)

The 2007 SuperLiga, the inaugural edition of the SuperLiga competition, was held from July 24 to August 29, 2007 in the United States. The eight clubs participating in the tournament were chosen by invitation.

All games of the tournament were carried live on Fox Sports World in Canada (English), Telefutura in the United States (Spanish), and Televisa and TV Azteca in Mexico (both Spanish).

== Qualification ==
The eight teams in the inaugural 2007 edition were selected on an invitation-only basis.

From (United States) Major League Soccer:

- D.C. United
- FC Dallas
- Houston Dynamo
- LA Galaxy

From (Mexico) Primera División de México:

- Monarcas Morelia
- Pachuca
- América
- Guadalajara

== Group stage ==
There were two groups of four teams. Each group contained two clubs from each league with the top two teams from each groups advancing to the semifinals.

=== Group A ===
Team	Pld	W	D	L	GF	GA	GD	Pts
(United States) LA Galaxy	3	2	0	1	9	8	+1	6
(Mexico) Pachuca	3	1	1	1	3	3	0	4
(Mexico) Guadalajara	3	1	1	1	3	3	0	4
(United States) FC Dallas	3	0	2	1	7	8	−1	2

July 24, 2007
21:00 EDT

FC Dallas (United States)	1–1	(Mexico) Guadalajara
Alvarez 56'; Moor (red card) 72'	Report	Olvera 67'

Pizza Hut Park, Frisco, Texas
Attendance: 12,641
Referee: Walter Quesada (Costa Rica)
July 24, 2007
23:00 EDT

LA Galaxy (United States)	2–1	(Mexico) Pachuca
Gordon 50'; Donovan 81'	Report	Márquez Lugo 78'

The Home Depot Center, Carson, California
Attendance: 19,317
Referee: Carlos Batres (Guatemala)

July 28, 2007
20:00 EDT

FC Dallas (United States)	1–1	(Mexico) Pachuca
Ruíz 75'	Report	Giménez 87' (pen.)

Pizza Hut Park, Frisco, Texas
Attendance: 7,953
Referee: Samir Osman (Egypt)
July 28, 2007
22:00 EDT

LA Galaxy (United States)	1–2	(Mexico) Guadalajara
Donovan 88'	Report	Rodríguez 59'; Bravo 82'

Los Angeles Memorial Coliseum, Los Angeles, California
Attendance: 37,337
Referee: Courtney Campbell (Jamaica)

July 31, 2007
20:00 EDT

FC Dallas (United States)	5–6	(United States) LA Galaxy
Alvarez 43'; Toja 78'; Alvarez 82'; Ruíz 90+1'; Thompson 90+6'	Report	Gordon 3'; Klein 12'; Gordon 15'; Harmse 18'; Donovan 84'; Pavón 90+5'

Pizza Hut Park, Frisco, Texas
Attendance: 21,576
Referee: Kevin Stott (United States)
July 31, 2007
22:00 EDT

Guadalajara (Mexico)	0–1	(Mexico) Pachuca
	Report	Márquez Lugo 62'

Dick's Sporting Goods Park, Commerce City, Colorado
Attendance: 14,069
Referee: Marco Antonio Rodriguez (Mexico)

=== Group B ===
Team	Pld	W	D	L	GF	GA	GD	Pts
(United States) Houston Dynamo	3	2	1	0	3	1	+2	7
(United States) D.C. United	3	1	1	1	2	2	0	4
(Mexico) América	3	1	0	2	3	4	−1	3
(Mexico) Monarcas Morelia	3	0	2	1	4	5	−1	2

July 25, 2007
20:00 EDT

D.C. United (United States)	1–1	(Mexico) Monarcas Morelia
Gomez 7'	Report	Landín (red card) 58'; Martínez 79'

RFK Stadium, Washington, D.C.
Attendance: 13,335
Referee: Courtney Campbell (Jamaica)
July 25, 2007
22:00 EDT

Houston Dynamo (United States)	1–0	(Mexico) América
Jaqua 41'	Report

Robertson Stadium, Houston, Texas
Attendance: 18,112
Referee: Samir Osman (Egypt)

July 29, 2007
20:00 EDT

D.C. United (United States)	1–0	(Mexico) América
Dyachenko 12'	Report	Rojas (red card) 49'

RFK Stadium, Washington, D.C.
Attendance: 18,604
Referee: Carlos Batres (Guatemala)
July 29, 2007
22:00 EDT

Houston Dynamo (United States)	1–1	(Mexico) Monarcas Morelia
Ngwenya 1'	Report	Batista 74'

Robertson Stadium, Houston, Texas
Attendance: 11,236
Referee: Walter Quesada (Costa Rica)

August 1, 2007
20:00 EDT

Houston Dynamo (United States)	1–0	(United States) D.C. United
Ching 50'	Report

Robertson Stadium, Houston, Texas
Attendance: 11,013
Referee: Baldomero Toledo (United States)
August 1, 2007
22:00 EDT

América (Mexico)	3–2	(Mexico) Monarcas Morelia
Mosqueda 17'; Cabañas 56' (pen.); Insúa 85'	Report	Romero (red card) 54'; Choy 67'; Landín 73'

Toyota Park, Bridgeview, Illinois
Attendance: 10,623
Referee: Hugo Leon Guajardo (Mexico)

== Knockout stage ==
=== Bracket ===
Semi-finals
14 August – Houston, TX
(United States) Houston Dynamo	2 (3)
(Mexico) Pachuca (p)	2 (4)
15 August – Carson, CA
(United States) LA Galaxy	2
(United States) D.C. United	0

Final
29 August – Carson, CA
(United States) LA Galaxy	1 (3)
(Mexico) Pachuca (p)	1 (4)

=== Semi-finals ===
August 14, 2007
22:00 EDT
02:00 UTC

Houston Dynamo (United States)	2–2 (a.e.t.)	(Mexico) Pachuca
DeRosario 4'; Ianni (red card) 13'; Robinson 83'; Ashe (red card) 102'	Report	Cacho 28'; Chitiva 62'; Chitiva (yellow card) 85' (red card)
Penalties
Barrett (penalty scored); Wondolowski (penalty scored); Mulrooney (penalty scored); Ching (penalty missed); Ngwenya (penalty missed)	3–4	(penalty scored) Salazar; (penalty scored) Caballero; (penalty scored) Rey; (penalty missed) Álvarez; (penalty scored) Lugo

Robertson Stadium, Houston, Texas
Attendance: 21,712
Referee: Ricardo Salazar (United States)

August 15, 2007
22:00 EDT

LA Galaxy (United States)	2–0	(United States) D.C. United
Beckham 27'; Donovan 47'	Report

The Home Depot Center, Carson, California
Attendance: 17,223
Referee: Alex Prus (United States)

=== Final ===
August 29, 2007
20:00 PDT
03:00 UTC

LA Galaxy (United States)	1–1 (a.e.t.)	(Mexico) Pachuca
Klein 90+3'	Report	Vagenas 29' (o.g.)
Penalties
Vagenas (penalty missed); Jones (penalty scored); Klein (penalty scored); Buddle (penalty scored); Donovan (penalty missed); Xavier (penalty missed)	3–4	(penalty scored) Lugo; (penalty scored) Rey; (penalty missed) Caballero; (penalty scored) Manzur; (penalty missed) Cabrera; (penalty scored) Rodríguez

The Home Depot Center, Carson, California
Attendance: 12,500
Referee: Carlos Batres (Guatemala)

2007 SuperLiga champions
(Mexico)
Pachuca
1st title

== Goalscorers ==
4 goals

- (United States) Landon Donovan ( (United States) LA Galaxy)

3 goals

- (United States) Arturo Alvarez ( (United States) FC Dallas)
- (United States) Alan Gordon ( (United States) LA Galaxy)

2 goals

- (United States) Chris Klein ( (United States) LA Galaxy)
- (Mexico) Rafael Márquez Lugo ( (Mexico) Pachuca)
- (Guatemala) Carlos Ruiz ( (United States) FC Dallas)

1 goal

- (Brazil) Marcio Antonio Batista ( (Mexico) Monarcas Morelia)
- (England) David Beckham ( (United States) LA Galaxy)
- (Mexico) Omar Bravo ( (Mexico) Guadalajara)
- (Paraguay) Salvador Cabañas ( (Mexico) América)
- (Mexico) Juan Carlos Cacho ( (Mexico) Pachuca)
- (United States) Brian Ching ( (United States) Houston Dynamo)
- (Colombia) Andrés Chitiva ( (Mexico) Pachuca)
- (Uruguay) Gonzalo Choy ( (Mexico) Monarcas Morelia)
- (Canada) Dwayne De Rosario ( (United States) Houston Dynamo)
- (Russia) Rod Dyachenko ( (United States) D.C. United)
- (Argentina) Christian Giménez ( (Mexico) Pachuca)
- (Argentina) Christian Gómez ( (United States) D.C. United)
- (Canada) Kevin Harmse ( (United States) LA Galaxy)
- (Argentina) Federico Insúa ( (Mexico) América)
- (United States) Nate Jaqua ( (United States) Houston Dynamo)
- (Mexico) Luis Ángel Landín ( (Mexico) Monarcas Morelia)
- (Mexico) Diego Martínez ( (Mexico) Monarcas Morelia)
- (Mexico) Juan Carlos Mosqueda ( (Mexico) América)
- (Zimbabwe) Joseph Ngwenya ( (United States) Houston Dynamo)
- (Mexico) José Antonio Olvera ( (Mexico) Guadalajara)
- (Honduras) Carlos Pavón ( (United States) LA Galaxy)
- (United States) Eddie Robinson ( (United States) Houston Dynamo)
- (Mexico) Francisco Javier Rodríguez ( (Mexico) Guadalajara)
- (United States) Abe Thompson ( (United States) FC Dallas)
- (Colombia) Juan Toja ( (United States) FC Dallas)
