= Javier Muñoz (Argentine footballer) =

Argentine footballer (born 1980)

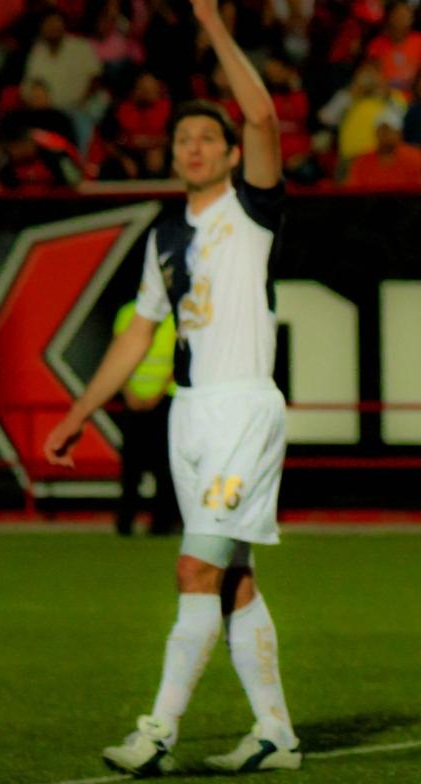

Personal information
- Full name: Javier David Muñoz Mustafá
- Date of birth: 11 June 1980 (age 46)
- Place of birth: Firmat, Argentina
- Height: 1.82 m (6 ft 0 in)
- Position: Defender

Senior career*
Years	Team	Apps	(Gls)
2001	Rosario Central	18	(0)
2002	Tenerife	4	(0)
2002–2003	Valladolid	10	(0)
2003–2004	Leganés	30	(1)
2004–2005	Independiente	36	(1)
2005	Santos Laguna	17	(0)
2006–2009	Atlante	128	(4)
2009–2012	Pachuca	128	(1)
2012	León	9	(0)
2013	San Luis	16	(1)
2013–2016	Chiapas	95	(2)
2017–2020	Firmat F.C.		
- * Club domestic league appearances and goals as of 23 February 2016

Javier David Muñoz Mustafá (born 11 June 1980) is an Argentine retired footballer who played for Chiapas F.C. He has the dubious distinction of being the only player to receive two red cards in the same edition of the North American Superliga. He also holds Mexican citizenship.

== Career ==
After playing for Mexican Primera División clubs Santos Laguna, Atlante F.C. and C.F. Pachuca, Muñoz Mustafá signed with Club León as part of its efforts to strengthen its squad for the Apertura 2012 tournament in June 2012.

== Honors ==
=== Club ===
Atlante F.C.

- (Mexico) Apertura 2007

=== Individual ===
- Apertura 2007 - Best Central Defender
