= Andrés Chitiva =

Colombian footballer (born 1979)

Personal information
- Full name: Andrés Chitiva Espinoza
- Date of birth: 13 August 1979 (age 47)
- Place of birth: Bogotá, Colombia
- Height: 1.70 m (5 ft 7 in)
- Position: Midfielder

Team information
- Current team: Pachuca U–18 (Manager)

Senior career*
| Years | Team | Apps | (Gls) |
| 1999–2000 | Millonarios | 52 | (7) |
| 2001–2011 | Pachuca | 230 | (34) |
| 2008 | → Indios (loan) | 12 | (0) |
| 2009 | → América (loan) | 7 | (1) |
| 2010 | → Atlas (loan) | 7 | (2) |
| 2011 | → Veracruz (loan) | 13 | (0) |
| Total | | 321 | (44) |

International career
| 2004–2008 | Colombia | 7 | (1) |

Managerial career
- 2012: Pachuca Reserves and Academy
- 2022–2023: Pachuca Premier
- 2023–: Pachuca U–18
- * Club domestic league appearances and goals

Andrés Chitiva Espinoza (born August 13, 1979) is a Colombian former professional footballer. He was a pacy left winger who possessed great speed, dribbling skills and crossing ability.

== Club career ==
Chitiva started his top-flight career in 1997 playing for Millonarios in his hometown of Bogotá in Colombia. In 2001, Chitiva was signed by Mexico's Pachuca, at the recommendation of the team's Colombian goalkeeper and captain Miguel Calero. Chitiva has been ever present in the Pachuca side ever since and a driving force in the team's four domestic Mexican titles (2001, 2003, 2006, 2007) since his arrival. Chitiva's ability to deliver the killer cross and finish in the box with timely runs have made him a hero to the Pachuca fans.

Most recently, Chitiva helped lead Pachuca to its historic capture of the South American Cup Copa Sudamericana - the first intercontinental title victory for a Mexican side.

In July 2011 he returned to Pachuca for the Apertura 2011 to finally retire as one of the most notable players in Pachuca's history.

== International career ==
Chitiva applied and received dual citizenship in Mexico so that Pachuca no longer has to use a foreigner spot for him in their roster. Chitiva remains, however, fiercely loyal to his Colombian heritage and has stated his desire to play for his nation's full national team on numerous occasions.

Former Colombian coach, Jorge Luis Pinto, capped the Pachuca player for two friendly matches against Switzerland and Paraguay in late March 2007. Although he entered as a substitute late in the Switzerland game, he helped finish the Colombian win with a final 3rd goal. He was also a crucial element in the 2–0 defeat against Paraguay three days later on March 28, 2007.

== Honours ==
Pachuca

- Mexican Championship - Invierno 2001, Apertura 2003, Clausura 2006, Clausura 2007
- CONCACAF Champions' Cup: 2002, 2007, 2008
- Copa Nissan Sudamericana: 2006
