= Miguel Calero =

Colombian footballer (1971–2012)

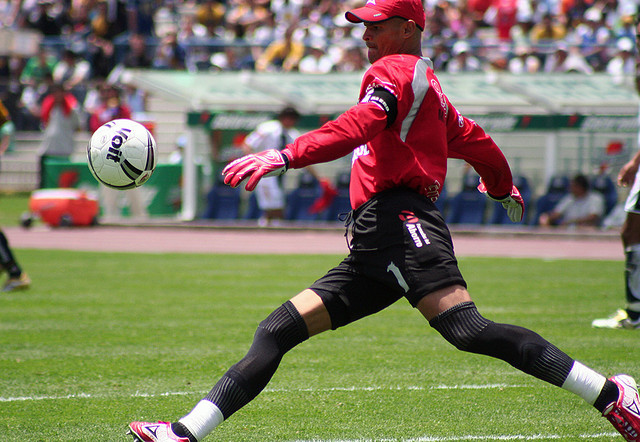
- Calero while playing for Pachuca in 2006

Personal information
- Full name: Miguel Ángel Calero Rodríguez
- Date of birth: 14 April 1971
- Place of birth: Ginebra, Colombia
- Date of death: 4 December 2012 (aged 41)
- Place of death: Mexico City, Mexico
- Height: 1.89 m (6 ft 2 in)
- Position: Goalkeeper

Youth career
- 1986–1988: Deportivo Cali

Senior career*
| Years | Team | Apps | (Gls) |
| 1988–1997 | Deportivo Cali | 94 | (2) |
| 1987–1992 | → Sporting de Barranquilla (loan) | 86 | (0) |
| 1998–2000 | Atlético Nacional | 91 | (0) |
| 2000–2011 | Pachuca | 395 | (1) |
| Total | | 667 | (3) |

International career
| 1995–2009 | Colombia | 50 | (0) |

Managerial career
- 2011–2012: Pachuca (Goalkeeper Trainer)
- * Club domestic league appearances and goals

Miguel Ángel Calero Rodríguez (14 April 1971 – 4 December 2012) was a Colombian professional footballer who played as a goalkeeper. He played 50 times for the Colombia national team between 1995 and 2007.

While playing in Colombia, Calero won two championships, one with Deportivo Cali (1996) and another one with Atlético Nacional (1998). In Mexico, he played 23 tournaments with Club Pachuca and won 10 cups with the team. At an international level, Calero won four CONCACAF Champions Leagues and the Copa Sudamericana in 2006; he also won the 2001 Copa América with Colombia's national team.

== Career ==
Calero was born in Ginebra, Valle del Cauca, Colombia, but later became a Mexican citizen.

He played for Deportivo Cali winning the 1996 Copa Mustang Division Mayor: Primera A championship title and Atlético Nacional Colombia, then moving to C.F. Pachuca, Mexico, where he was captain of the team. With Pachuca, he won four national championships, three CONCACAF Champions Cups, one Copa Sudamericana and one SuperLiga title. He scored a goal against Chiapas on 11 August 2002.

He played for the Colombia national team and was a participant at the 1992 Summer Olympics and at the 1998 FIFA World Cup. In 2001 he was part of the Colombia team that won their first ever Copa América championship.

He was known for wearing a baseball cap as a goalkeeper and a bandana, and for having a pair of wings on the back of his jersey around his number, 1. These wings symbolize his nickname, "El Cóndor".

After a poor performance in Copa América 2007, which included a 5–0 loss to Paraguay, Calero announced his retirement from the Colombia national team.

On 23 October 2011, Calero played his last game with Pachuca and retired from football.

== Health deterioration and death ==
Calero was hospitalized on 26 November 2012 after he suffered from a cerebral thrombosis at his home in Pachuca. After suffering from a second cerebral thrombosis episode, Calero was pronounced clinically brain dead on 3 December 2012. For the rest of the day, he remained on life support but the injuries were irreversible. At a public conference on noon of 4 December, Calero was declared dead. His funeral was held in Pachuca, Hidalgo, home of his tenured club CF Pachuca. After the ceremonies, Calero was later cremated and his remains were divided with one half of it sent to his native Colombia, whereas the rest stayed in Mexico.

== Honors ==
Deportivo Cali

- Categoría Primera A: 1996

Atletico Nacional

- Categoría Primera A: 1999

Pachuca

- Mexican Championship: Invierno 2001, Apertura 2003, Clausura 2006, Clausura 2007.
- CONCACAF Champions' Cup: 2002, 2007, 2008, 2010.
- Copa Sudamericana: 2006
- North American SuperLiga: 2007

Colombia

- Copa América: 2001
