= North American SuperLiga =

SuperLiga
- Founded: 2007; 19 years ago
- Abolished: 2010; 16 years ago
- Region: NAFU (Canada, Mexico, United States)
- Teams: 8
- Last champion(s): (Mexico) Morelia (1st title)
- Most championships: (United States) New England Revolution (Mexico) Pachuca (Mexico) Tigres UANL (Mexico) Morelia (1 title each)

The SuperLiga was an annual association football competition in North America between four clubs from the Major League Soccer (United States and Canada) and four clubs from the Primera División (Mexico), the top professional league in each country. The competition was sanctioned by CONCACAF, U.S. Soccer, Canada Soccer and FMF, which served as the regional club tournament for the North American zone under CONCACAF, much like the Copa Interclubes UNCAF for the Central American zone and the CFU Club Championship for the Caribbean zone. The tournament was held from 2007 to 2010.

== Competition format ==
The format consisted of a group stage, followed by playoffs or "knockout" rounds, with all games held at MLS sites. The tournament had an invitational format for its 2007 debut, with four teams invited from both Major League Soccer and the Primera División de México. For successive tournaments, MLS announced that "the four MLS teams with the best regular season records in 2007 will qualify for SuperLiga 2008". However, after problems of fixture congestion during the 2008 season, Major League Soccer announced that starting with SuperLiga 2009 it would no longer allow teams to compete in both the CONCACAF Champions League and the SuperLiga, so the criteria for MLS teams was amended to the top four teams not already qualified for the Champions League. For the Primera División de México, the champions of the last 4 semi-annual tournaments earned berths to SuperLiga.

The tournament was discontinued after the 2010 edition, with MLS commissioner Don Garber stating that “SuperLiga was a great tournament which served its purpose during its time. CONCACAF got more and more committed to a continental tournament with the Champions League, which we’re very supportive of. It has delivered the value we intended in SuperLiga to put our teams against the best competition in this region.”

A new inter-league competition, the Leagues Cup, was established by Major League Soccer and Liga MX in 2019.

== Broadcasting ==
The tournament was telecast live by Univision's TeleFutura network in the United States and by Televisa and TV Azteca in Mexico. It could also be seen in English on Fox Sports World Canada, MLS Soccer, and SuperLiga2010.com, which all shared the same feed. The tournament was also streamed live at UnivisionFutbol.com.

== Results ==
Finals
Ed.	Year	Champions	Results	Runners-up
1	2007	(Mexico) Pachuca	1–1 (4–3 p)	(United States) LA Galaxy
2	2008	(United States) New England Revolution	2–2 (6–5 p)	(United States) Houston Dynamo
3	2009	(Mexico) Tigres UANL	1–1 (4–3 p)	(United States) Chicago Fire
4	2010	(Mexico) Morelia	2–1	(United States) New England Revolution

== Performances ==
Performance by club
Club	Titles	Runners-up	Winning editions	Runners-up editions
(United States) New England Revolution	1	1	2008	2010
(Mexico) Pachuca	1	0	2007	–
(Mexico) Tigres UANL	1	0	2009	–
(Mexico) Morelia	1	0	2010	–
(United States) LA Galaxy	0	1	–	2007
(United States) Houston Dynamo	0	1	–	2008
(United States) Chicago Fire	0	1	–	2009

Performance by nation
Nation	Titles	Runners-up	Total
Mexico	3	0	3
United States	1	4	5

== See also ==
- Leagues Cup
- Campeones Cup
