= 2009 in American soccer =

Soccer in the United States
- Season: 2009

Men's soccer
- Supporters' Shield: Columbus Crew
- USL First Division: Montreal Impact
- USL Second Division: Richmond Kickers
- NPSL: Sonoma County Sol
- PDL: Ventura County Fusion
- US Open Cup: Seattle Sounders FC
- MLS Cup: Real Salt Lake

The 2009 season was the 97th season of soccer in the United States. This season included playing in the 2009 FIFA Confederations Cup and the 2009 CONCACAF Gold Cup.

== National team ==
=== Men ===
==== Senior ====
Wins	Losses	Draws
13	8	3

The home team or the team that is designated as the home team is listed in the left column; the away team is in the right

column.

Win Draw Loss

January 24 International friendly	United States	3–2	Sweden	Carson, California
17:30 UTC−08	Kljestan 17', 40' (pen.), 74'	(Report)	Nannskog 73'; Dahlberg 89'	Stadium: Home Depot Center; Attendance: 9,918; Referee: Silvio Petrescu (Canada)

February 11 World Cup qualifying 4th round	United States	2–0	Mexico	Columbus, Ohio
19:00 UTC−05	Bradley 43', 90+2'	(Report)		Stadium: Columbus Crew Stadium; Attendance: 23,776; Referee: Carlos Batres (Guatemala)

March 28 World Cup qualifying 4th round	El Salvador	2–2	United States	San Salvador, El Salvador
19:00 UTC−06	Quintanilla 15'; Castillo 72'	(Report)	Altidore 77'; Hejduk 88'	Stadium: Estadio Cuscatlán; Attendance: 30,500; Referee: Benito Archundia (Mexico)

April 1 World Cup qualifying 4th round	United States	3–0	Trinidad and Tobago	Nashville, Tennessee
18:45 UTC−06	Altidore 13', 71', 89'	(Report)		Stadium: LP Field; Attendance: 27,959; Referee: Roberto Moreno (Panama)

June 3 World Cup qualifying 4th round	Costa Rica	3–1	United States	San José, Costa Rica
20:05 UTC−06	Saborio 2'; Borges 13'; Herrera 69'	(Report)	Donovan 90+2' (pen.)	Stadium: Estadio Ricardo Saprissa Aymá; Attendance: 19,200; Referee: Neal Brizan (Trinidad & Tobago)

June 6 World Cup qualifying 4th round	United States	2–1	Honduras	Chicago, Illinois
19:30 UTC−05	Donovan 43' (pen.); Bocanegra 68'	(Report)	Costly 5'	Stadium: Soldier Field; Attendance: 55,647; Referee: Mauricio Morales (Mexico)

June 15 Confederations Cup group stage	United States	1–3	Italy	Pretoria, South Africa
20:30 UTC+2	Donovan 41' (pen.)	(Report)	Rossi 58', 90+4'; De Rossi 72'	Stadium: Loftus Versfeld Stadium; Attendance: 34,341; Referee: Pablo Pozo (Chile)

June 18 Confederations Cup group stage	United States	0–3	Brazil	Pretoria, South Africa
16:00 UTC+2		(Report)	Felipe Melo 7'; Robinho 20'; Maicon 62'	Stadium: Loftus Versfeld Stadium; Attendance: 39,617; Referee: Massimo Busacca (Switzerland)

June 21 Confederations Cup group stage	Egypt	0–3	United States	Rustenburg, South Africa
20:30 UTC+2		(Report)	Davies 21'; Bradley 63'; Dempsey 71'	Stadium: Royal Bafokeng Stadium; Attendance: 23,140; Referee: Michael Hester (New Zealand)

June 24 Confederations Cup Semifinal	Spain	0–2	United States	Bloemfontein, South Africa
20:30 UTC+2		(Report)	Altidore 27'; Dempsey 74'	Stadium: Free State Stadium; Attendance: 35,396; Referee: Jorge Larrionda (Uruguay)

June 28 Confederations Cup Final	United States	2–3	Brazil	Johannesburg, South Africa
20:30 UTC+2	Dempsey 10'; Donovan 27'	(Report)	Luís Fabiano 46', 74'; Lúcio 84'	Stadium: Ellis Park; Attendance: 52,291; Referee: Martin Hansson (Sweden)

July 4 Gold Cup group stage	Grenada	0–4	United States	Seattle, Washington
18:00 UTC−07		Report	Adu 7'; Holden 31'; Rogers 60'; Davies 69'	Stadium: Qwest Field; Attendance: 15,387; Referee: Walter López (Guatemala)

July 8 Gold Cup group stage	United States	2–0	Honduras	Washington, D.C.
21:00 UTC−04	Quaranta 74'; Ching 79'	Report		Stadium: Robert F. Kennedy Memorial Stadium; Attendance: 26,079; Referee: Courtney Campbell (Jamaica)

July 11 Gold Cup group stage	United States	2–2	Haiti	Foxborough, Massachusetts
19:00 UTC−04	Arnaud 6'; Holden 90+2'	Report	Sirin 46'; Chéry 49'	Stadium: Gillette Stadium; Attendance: 24,137; Referee: Wálter Quesada (Costa Rica)

July 18 Gold Cup Quarterfinal	United States	2 – 1 (a.e.t.)	Panama	Philadelphia, Pennsylvania
20:00 UTC−04	Beckerman 49'; Cooper 106' (pen.)	(Report)	Pérez 45'	Stadium: Lincoln Financial Field; Attendance: 32,000; Referee: Benito Archundia (Mexico)

July 23 Gold Cup Semifinal	Honduras	0–2	United States	Chicago, Illinois
19:00 UTC−05		(Report)	Goodson 45'; Cooper 90'	Stadium: Soldier Field; Attendance: 55,173; Referee: Courtney Campbell (Jamaica)

July 26 Gold Cup Final	United States	0–5	Mexico	East Rutherford, New Jersey
15:00 UTC−04		(Report)	Torrado 56' (pen.) dos Santos 62'; Vela 68'; J.A. Castro 78'; Franco 90'	Stadium: Giants Stadium; Attendance: 79,156; Referee: Courtney Campbell (Jamaica)

August 12 World Cup qualifying 4th round	Mexico	2–1	United States	Mexico City, Mexico
15:00 UTC−05	Castro 19'; Sabah 82'	(Report)	Davies 9'	Stadium: Estadio Azteca; Attendance: 104,499; Referee: Roberto Moreno (Panama)

September 5 World Cup qualifying 4th round	United States	2–1	El Salvador	Sandy, Utah
18:00 UTC−06	Dempsey 41'; Altidore 45+2'	(Report)	Castillo 32'	Stadium: Rio Tinto Stadium; Attendance: 19,066; Referee: Jose Pineda (Honduras)

September 9 World Cup qualifying 4th round	Trinidad and Tobago	0–1	United States	Port of Spain, Trinidad and Tobago
19:00 UTC−04		(Report)	Clark 62'	Stadium: Hasely Crawford Stadium; Attendance: 12,000; Referee: Joel Aguilar (El Salvador)

October 10 World Cup qualifying 4th round	Honduras	2–3	United States	San Pedro Sula, Honduras
20:00 UTC−06	de León 47' de León 78'	(Report)	Casey 55', 66'; Donovan 71'	Stadium: Estadio Francisco Morazán; Attendance: 39,800; Referee: Roberto Moreno (Panama)

October 14 World Cup qualifying 4th round	United States	2–2	Costa Rica	Washington, D.C.
20:00 UTC−04	Bradley 72'; Bornstein 90+5'	(Report)	Ruiz 21', 24'	Stadium: RFK Stadium; Attendance: 26,243; Referee: Benito Archundia (Mexico)

November 14 International friendly	Slovakia	1–0	United States	Bratislava, Slovakia
20:00 UTC+01	Hamšík 26' (pen.)	(Report)		Stadium: Tehelné Pole; Attendance: 7,200; Referee: Stefan Messner (Austria)

November 18 International friendly	Denmark	3–1	United States	Aarhus, Denmark
20:40 UTC+01	Absalonsen 47'; Rieks 52'; Bernburg 57'	(Report)	Cunningham 26'	Stadium: NRGi Park; Attendance: 15,172; Referee: Craig Thomson (Scotland)

=== Women ===
==== Senior ====
Wins	Losses	Draws
7	0	1

The United States Women's National Soccer Team was coached by Pia Sundhage.

===== Algarve Cup =====
Mar 4 Group B	United States	2–0	Denmark	Lagos, Portugal
7:00 a.m. UTC−05	Woznuk 22'; DiMartino 35'	Report		Stadium: Municipal Stadium; Attendance: 200; Referee: Jenny Palmqvist (SWE); Assistant referees: Helen Caro (SWE); Anna Nystrom (SWE); Fourth official: Efthalia Mitsi (GRE)

Mar 6 Group B	United States	1–0	Iceland	Ferreiras, Portugal
10:00 a.m. UTC−05	Kai 90'	Report		Stadium: Parque Desportiva da Nora; Attendance: 250; Referee: BBibiana Steinhaus (GER); Assistant referees: Moiken Reichert (GER); Marina Wozniak (GER); Fourth official: Kirsi Savolainen (FIN)

Mar 9 Group B	United States	1–0	Norway	Ferreiras, Portugal
11:00 a.m. UTC−05	Rapinoe 21'	Report		Stadium: Parque Desportiva da Nora; Attendance: 400; Referee: Gyongyi Gall (HUN); Assistant referees: Yolanda Parga Rodriguez (ESP); Maria Luisa Villa Gutierres (ESP); Fourth official: Kirsi Savolainen (FIN)

Mar 11 Final	United States	1–1 (3–4 p)	Sweden	Faro, Portugal
12:00 p.m. UTC−05	Lilly 12'	Report	Schelin 18'	Stadium: Estadio Algarve; Attendance: 1,200; Referee: Bibiana Steinhaus (GER); Assistant referees: Marina Wozniak (GER); Moiken Reichert (GER); Fourth official: Gyongyi Gaal (HUN)
	Penalties
	Boxx (penalty scored); Rapinoe (penalty missed); Lloyd (penalty scored); Rampone (penalty missed); DiMartino (penalty scored); Woznuk (penalty missed); Mitts (penalty missed)		(penalty scored) Fors; (penalty scored) Dahlkvist; (penalty scored) Sembrant; (penalty missed) Paulson; (penalty missed) Schelin; (penalty missed) Olander; (penalty scored) Segerström

===== International friendlies =====
May 25	United States	4–0	Canada	Toronto, Ontario, Canada
7:00 p.m. UTC−05	Boxx 2'; Rapinoe 46'; Tarpley 77'; Cheney 80'	Report		Stadium: BMO Field; Attendance: 10,255; Referee: Darci Kruse (CAN); Assistant referees: Suzanne Morisset (CAN); Shauna Poirer (CAN); Fourth official: Carol Anne Chenard (CAN)

July 19	United States	1–0	Canada	Rochester, New York
3:00 p.m. UTC−05	Wambach 78'	Report		Stadium: Marina Auto Stadium; Attendance: 8,433; Referee: Margaret Domka (USA); Assistant referees: Katherine Dziedzic (USA); Danielle Magouirk (USA); Fourth official: Steve Montanino (USA)

July 22	United States	1–0	Canada	Charleston, South Carolina
8:00 p.m. UTC−05	Nairn 89'	Report		Stadium: Blackbaud Stadium; Attendance: 4,041; Referee: Sandra Serafini (USA); Assistant referees: Debbie Coleman (USA); Melanie Johnson (USA); Fourth official: Alan Schechtman (USA)

October 29	United States	1–0	Germany	Augsburg, Germany
1:00 p.m. UTC−05	Wambach 34'	Report		Stadium: Impuls Arena; Attendance: 28,377; Referee: Gyoengyi Gaal (HUN); Assistant referees: Inka Muller (GER); Marija Kurtes (GER)

== Major League Soccer ==
=== Table ===
Pos	Team	Pld	W	L	T	GF	GA	GD	Pts	Qualification
1	Columbus Crew (S)	30	13	7	10	41	31	+10	49	CONCACAF Champions League
2	LA Galaxy	30	12	6	12	36	31	+5	48	CONCACAF Champions League
3	Houston Dynamo	30	13	8	9	39	29	+10	48	North American SuperLiga
4	Seattle Sounders FC	30	12	7	11	38	29	+9	47	CONCACAF Champions League
5	Chicago Fire	30	11	7	12	39	34	+5	45	North American SuperLiga
6	Chivas USA	30	13	11	6	34	31	+3	45	North American SuperLiga
7	New England Revolution	30	11	10	9	33	37	−4	42	North American SuperLiga
8	Real Salt Lake (C)	30	11	12	7	43	35	+8	40	CONCACAF Champions League
9	Colorado Rapids	30	10	10	10	42	38	+4	40	
10	D.C. United	30	9	8	13	43	44	−1	40	
11	FC Dallas	30	11	13	6	50	47	+3	39	
12	Toronto FC	30	10	11	9	37	46	−9	39	CONCACAF Champions League
13	Kansas City Wizards	30	8	13	9	33	42	−9	33	
14	San Jose Earthquakes	30	7	14	9	36	50	−14	30	
15	New York Red Bulls	30	5	19	6	27	47	−20	21	

Source: MLS
Rules for classification: 1) points; 2) head-to-head record; 3) goal difference; 4) number of goals scored
(C) Champions; (S) Supporters' Shield

=== Playoffs ===
Conference semifinals
E1	Columbus	0	2
E4	Salt Lake	1	3
Eastern Conference
E3	New England	2	0
E2	Chicago	1	2
W1	Los Angeles	2	1
W4	Chivas USA	2	0
Western Conference
W3	Seattle	0	0
W2	Houston (AET)	0	1

Conference finals
E4	Salt Lake (AET) (PEN)	(0)5
E2	Chicago	(0)4
W1	Los Angeles (AET)	2
W2	Houston	0

MLS Cup
E4	Salt Lake (AET) (PEN)	(1)5
W1	Los Angeles	(1)4

=== MLS Cup ===
November 22
17:30 UTC−08

Real Salt Lake	1 – 1 (a.e.t.)	Los Angeles Galaxy
Findley 64'	(Report)	Magee 41'
Penalties
Mathis (penalty scored); Findley (penalty scored); Beckerman (penalty missed); Grabavoy (penalty scored); Williams (penalty missed); Wingert (penalty scored); Russell (penalty scored)	5–4	(penalty scored) Beckham; (penalty scored) Berhalter; (penalty missed) Kirovski; (penalty missed) Donovan; (penalty scored) Magee; (penalty scored) Klein; (penalty missed) Buddle

Qwest Field, Seattle, Washington
Attendance: 46,011
Referee: Kevin Stott

== USL First Division ==
=== Table ===
Pos	Team	Pld	W	L	T	GF	GA	GD	Pts
1	Portland Timbers	30	16	4	10	45	19	+26	58
2	Carolina RailHawks FC	30	16	7	7	43	19	+24	55
3	Puerto Rico Islanders	30	15	7	8	44	31	+13	53
4	Charleston Battery	30	14	6	10	33	21	+12	53
5	Montreal Impact	30	12	10	8	32	31	+1	44
6	Rochester Rhinos	30	11	9	10	34	32	+2	43
7	Vancouver Whitecaps FC	30	11	10	9	42	36	+6	42
8	Minnesota Thunder	30	7	13	10	39	44	−5	31
9	Miami FC	30	8	17	5	26	52	−26	29
10	Austin Aztex FC	30	5	17	8	28	51	−23	21^{1}
11	Cleveland City Stars	30	4	19	7	22	52	−30	19

Purple indicates league title clinched.
Green indicates playoff berth clinched.
^{1}Austin was docked two points for fielding an ineligible player during a match against Montreal Impact on July 25, 2009.

=== Playoffs ===
Teams will be re-seeded for semifinal matchups

Quarterfinals
2	Carolina RailHawks FC	0	0	0
7	Vancouver Whitecaps FC	1	0	1
3	Puerto Rico Islanders	1	4	5
6	Rochester Rhinos	2	1	3
4	Charleston Battery	0	1	1
5	Montreal Impact	2	2	4

Semifinals
1	Portland Timbers	1	3	4
7	Vancouver Whitecaps FC	2	3	5
3	Puerto Rico Islanders	1	1	2
5	Montreal Impact	2	2	4

Final
5	Montreal Impact	3	3	6
7	Vancouver Whitecaps FC	2	1	3

=== Finals ===
October 10
18:30 UTC−08

Montreal Impact	3–2	Vancouver Whitecaps FC
Pejic 45' (o.g.); Byers 63'; Sebrango 89'	(Report)	Haber 56'; James 65'

Swangard Stadium, Burnaby, British Columbia, Canada
Attendance: 5,886
Referee: Carol Anne Chenard (Canada)
October 17
14:30 UTC−04

Vancouver Whitecaps FC	1–3	Montreal Impact
Toure 44'	(Report)	Donatelli 30' (pen.); Gjertsen 40'; Brown 42'

Saputo Stadium, Montreal, Quebec, Canada
Attendance: 13,034
Referee: Dave Gantar

Montreal wins on aggregate 6–3.

== USL Second Division ==
=== Table ===
Pos	Team	Pld	W	L	T	GF	GA	GD	Pts
1	Wilmington Hammerheads	20	12	3	5	42	24	+18	41
2	Richmond Kickers	20	11	3	6	39	18	+21	39
3	Harrisburg City Islanders	20	9	7	4	31	23	+8	31
4	Charlotte Eagles	20	8	5	7	40	28	+12	31
5	Real Maryland Monarchs	20	8	10	2	22	31	−9	26
6	Crystal Palace Baltimore	20	6	9	5	16	20	−4	23
7	Western Mass Pioneers	20	6	9	5	21	34	−13	23
8	Pittsburgh Riverhounds	20	6	10	4	18	27	−9	22
9	Bermuda Hogges	20	4	12	4	19	43	−24	16

Purple indicates league title clinched
Green indicates playoff berth clinched

=== Playoffs ===
Quarterfinals
4	Charlotte Eagles	3
5	Real Maryland Monarchs	1

Semifinals
1	Wilmington Hammerheads	0
4	Charlotte Eagles	1
2	Richmond Kickers (AET)	1
3	Harrisburg City Islanders	0

Final
2	Richmond Kickers	3
4	Charlotte Eagles	1

=== Final ===
August 29
20:00 UTC−04

Charlotte Eagles	1–3	Richmond Kickers
Martins 14'	(Report)	Elcock 63'; DiRaimondo 83'; Bulow 86' (pen.)

University of Richmond Stadium, Richmond, Virginia
Attendance: 2,991
Referee: Tony Russo

== Lamar Hunt U.S. Open Cup ==
Home teams listed on top of bracket

Third round June 30, 2009
MLS	D.C. United	2
PDL	Ocean City Barons	0
MLS	New England Revolution	1
USL-2	Harrisburg City Islanders	2
USL-1	Rochester Rhinos	1 (5)
MLS	Columbus Crew	1 (3)
USL-2	Wilmington Hammerheads	1
MLS	Chicago Fire	0
USL-1	Portland Timbers	1
MLS	Seattle Sounders FC	2
USL-1	Minnesota Thunder	3 (2)
MLS	Kansas City Wizards	3 (4)
USL-1	Austin Aztex	0
MLS	Houston Dynamo	2
USL-1	Charleston Battery	3
MLS	Chivas USA	1

Quarterfinals; July 7, 2009
MLS	D.C. United	2
USL-2	Harrisburg City Islanders	1
USL-1	Rochester Rhinos	2
USL-2	Wilmington Hammerheads	1
MLS	Seattle Sounders FC	1
MLS	Kansas City Wizards	0
MLS	Houston Dynamo	4
USL-1	Charleston Battery	0

Semifinals; July 21, 2009
MLS	D.C. United	2
USL-1	Rochester Rhinos	1
MLS	Seattle Sounders FC (aet)	2
MLS	Houston Dynamo	1

Final; September 2, 2009
MLS	D.C. United	1
MLS	Seattle Sounders FC	2

=== Final ===
September 2
19:30 UTC−04

Seattle Sounders FC (MLS)	2–1	D.C. United (MLS)
Montero 67'; Levesque 86'	(Report)	Simms 89'

RFK Stadium, Washington, D.C.
Attendance: 17,329
Referee: Alex Prus

== American clubs in international competitions ==
Club	Competition	Final round
Houston Dynamo	2008–09 CONCACAF Champions League	Quarterfinals
Houston Dynamo	2009–10 CONCACAF Champions League	Group stage
Columbus Crew	2009–10 CONCACAF Champions League	Quarterfinals
New York Red Bulls	2009–10 CONCACAF Champions League	preliminary round
D.C. United	2009–10 CONCACAF Champions League	Group stage
Chicago Fire	2009 SuperLiga	Final
New England Revolution	2009 SuperLiga	Semifinal
Chivas USA	2009 SuperLiga	Group stage
Kansas City Wizards	2009 SuperLiga	Group stage
Los Angeles Galaxy	2009 Pan-Pacific Championship	Final

=== Houston Dynamo ===
February 24 Champions League quarterfinals	Houston (United States)	1–1	(Mexico) Atlante	Houston, Texas
21:00 UTC−06	Boswell 30'	(Report)	Pereyra 82'	Stadium: Robertson Stadium; Attendance: 10,203; Referee: Neal Brizan (Trinidad and Tobago)

March 3 Champions League quarterfinals	Atlante (Mexico)	3–0	(United States) Houston	Cancún, Mexico
21:00 UTC−06	Navarro 24'; Márquez 37'; Maldonado 90'	(Report)		Stadium: Estadio Andrés Quintana Roo; Attendance: 10,000; Referee: Silviu Petrescu (Canada)

August 19 Champions League group stage	Houston (United States)	1–0	(El Salvador) Isidro Metapán	Houston, Texas
20:00 UTC−05	Ching 68'	Report		Stadium: Robertson Stadium; Attendance: 7,997; Referee: Mauricio Morales (Mexico)

August 26 Group stage	Árabe Unido (Panama)	1–1	(United States) Houston	Panama City, Panama
20:00 UTC−05	Rodríguez 86'	Report	Kamara 69'	Stadium: Estadio Agustín Sánchez; Attendance: 1,300; Referee: Neal Brizan (Trinidad and Tobago)

September 16 Champions League group stage	Pachuca (Mexico)	2–0	(United States) Houston	Pachuca, Mexico
22:00 UTC−05	Benitez 25'; Aguilar 74'	Report		Stadium: Estadio Hidalgo; Attendance: 18,000; Referee: Elmer Bonilla (El Salvador)

September 22 Champions League group stage	Houston (United States)	5–1	(Panama) Árabe Unido	Houston, Texas
22:00 UTC−05	Robinson 11'; Weaver 50'; Ashe 70'; Holden 74', 90'	(Report)	Rodríguez 69'	Stadium: Robertson Stadium; Attendance: 6,938; Referee: Paul Delgadillo (Mexico)

September 30 Champions League group stage	Houston (United States)	0–1	(Mexico) Pachuca	Houston, Texas
22:00 UTC−05		(Report)	Benítez 23'	Stadium: Robertson Stadium; Attendance: 10,130; Referee: Roberto Moreno (Panama)

October 21 Champions League group stage	Isidro Metapán (El Salvador)	3–2	(United States) Houston	Metapán, El Salvador
22:00 UTC−05	Montes 7'; Canales 8'; Umaña 56'	(Report)	Cameron 28'; Hall 45'	Stadium: Estadio Jorge Calero Suárez; Attendance: 1,200; Referee: José Pineda (Honduras)

=== Columbus Crew ===
August 18 Champions League group stage	Columbus (United States)	2–0	Puerto Rico Islanders	Columbus, Ohio
20:00 UTC−04	Lenhart 58'; Rogers 79'	Report		Stadium: Columbus Crew Stadium; Attendance: 6,161; Referee: Roberto Moreno (Panama)

August 26 Champions League group stage	Cruz Azul (Mexico)	5–0	(United States) Columbus	Mexico City, Mexico
22:00 UTC−05	Lozano 4', 82' (pen.), 87'; Núñez 9'; Marshall 47' (o.g.)	Report		Stadium: Estadio Azul; Attendance: 2,669; Referee: Óscar Moncada (Honduras)

September 16 Champions League group stage	Saprissa (Costa Rica)	0–1	(United States) Columbus	San José, Costa Rica
22:00 UTC−06		(Report)	Gaven 5'	Stadium: Estadio Ricardo Saprissa Aymá; Attendance: 5,600; Referee: Roberto García (Mexico)

September 23 Champions League group stage	Columbus (United States)	0–2	(Mexico) Cruz Azul	Columbus, Ohio
20:00 UTC−05		(Report)	Zeballos 14'; Vela 39'	Stadium: Columbus Crew Stadium; Attendance: 7,921; Referee: Geoffrey Hospedales (Trinidad & Tobago)

September 29 Champions League group stage	Columbus (United States)	1–1	(Costa Rica) Saprissa	Columbus, Ohio
20:00 UTC−05	Rogers 26' (pen.)	(Report)	Robinson 90+2'	Stadium: Columbus Crew Stadium; Attendance: 5,715; Referee: Mauricio Morales (Mexico)

October 20 Champions League group stage	Puerto Rico Islanders	1–1	(United States) Columbus	Bayamón, Puerto Rico
19:00 UTC−04	Delgado 34'	(Report)	Rentería 74'	Stadium: Estadio Juan Ramón Loubriel; Attendance: 300; Referee: Elmer Bonilla (El Salvador)

=== D.C. United ===
July 28 Champions League preliminary round	D.C. United (United States)	1–1	(El Salvador) Luis Ángel Firpo	Washington, D.C.
20:00 UTC−04	Moreno 42' (pen.)	Report	26' Benítez	Stadium: RFK Stadium; Attendance: 8,026; Referee: Paúl Delgadillo (Mexico)

August 4 Champions League preliminary round	Luis Ángel Firpo (El Salvador)	1 – 1 (a.e.t.) (4–5 p)	(United States) D.C. United	San Salvador, El Salvador
20:00 UTC−06	Franco 39' (pen.)	Report	42' Gómez	Stadium: Estadio Cuscatlán; Attendance: 11,000; Referee: Óscar Moncada (Honduras)
	Penalties
	Alas (penalty scored); J. Sánchez (penalty scored); Merino (penalty scored); Salazar (penalty missed); C. Sánchez (penalty scored)		(penalty scored) Pontius; (penalty scored) Szetela; (penalty scored) Olsen; (penalty scored) Burch; (penalty scored) Gómez

August 18 Champions League group stage	Marathón (Honduras)	3–1	(United States) D.C. United	San Pedro Sula, Honduras
22:00 UTC−05	Martínez 23'; Palacios 83'; Berrios 88' (pen.)	Report	48' Emilio	Stadium: Estadio Olímpico Metropolitano; Attendance: 3,658; Referee: Edward Bonilla (El Salvador)

August 26 Champions League group stage	D.C. United (United States)	1–3	(Mexico) Toluca	Washington, D.C.
20:00 UTC−04	Pontius 47'	Report	5' Marín; 79', 86' Mancilla	Stadium: RFK Stadium; Attendance: 8,834; Referee: Courtney Campbell (Jamaica)

September 15 Champions League group stage	San Juan Jabloteh (Trinidad and Tobago)	0–1	(United States) D.C. United	Port of Spain, Trinidad and Tobago
20:00 UTC−04		Report	14' (pen.) Gómez	Stadium: Hasely Crawford Stadium; Attendance: 2,000; Referee: Trevor Taylor (Barbados)

September 24 Champions League group stage	D.C. United (United States)	3–0	(Honduras) Marathón	Washington, D.C.
20:00 UTC−04	Emilio 47', 71'; Moreno 55'	(Report)		Stadium: RFK Stadium; Attendance: 5,280; Referee: Silviu Petsrecu (Canada)

September 30 Champions League group stage	D.C. United (United States)	5–1	(Trinidad and Tobago) San Juan Jabloteh	Washington, D.C.
20:00 UTC−04	Gómez 13', 68'; Fred 30'; Khumalo 43', 90'	(Report)	83' Britto	Stadium: RFK Stadium; Attendance: 3,411; Referee: German Arredondo (Mexico)

October 20 Champions League group stage	Toluca (Mexico)	1–1	(United States) D.C. United	Toluca, Mexico
20:00 UTC−04	López 62' (pen.)	(Report)	6' Pontius	Stadium: Estadio Nemesio Díez; Attendance: 9,909; Referee: Geoffrey Hospedales (Trinidad & Tobago)

=== New York Red Bulls ===
July 30 Champions League preliminary round	W Connection (Trinidad and Tobago)	2–2	(United States) New York	Marabella, Trinidad and Tobago
20:00 UTC−04	Frias 40'; Hector 72'	Report	Öbster 47'; Joseph 60' (o.g.)	Stadium: Manny Ramjohn Stadium; Attendance: 6,500; Referee: Raymond Bogle (Jamaica)

August 5 Champions League preliminary round	New York (United States)	1–2	(Trinidad and Tobago) W Connection	East Rutherford, New Jersey
20:00 UTC−04	Wolyniec 19'	Report	Toussaint 40', 45'	Stadium: Giants Stadium; Attendance: 6,549; Referee: Paul Ward (Canada)

=== Chicago Fire ===
June 20 SuperLiga group stage	Chicago (United States)	1–0	(Mexico) San Luis	Bridgeview, Illinois
19:00 UTC−05	McBride 57'	Report		Stadium: Toyota Park; Attendance: 8,421; Referee: Silviu Petrescu (Canada)

June 23 SuperLiga group stage	Chicago (United States)	1–0	(United States) Chivas USA	Bridgeview, Illinois
19:00 UTC−05	Mapp 35'	Report		Stadium: Toyota Park; Attendance: 9,126; Referee: Mark Geiger

June 27 SuperLiga group stage	Chicago (United States)	1–2	(Mexico) UANL	Bridgeview, Illinois
19:00 UTC−05	Blanco 85' (pen.)	Report	Pulido 37', 61'	Stadium: Toyota Park; Attendance: 9,157; Referee: Kevin Thomas (Jamaica)

July 15 SuperLiga Semifinal	New England (United States)	1–2	(United States) Chicago	Foxborough, Massachusetts
19:00 UTC−04	Jankauskas 44'	Report	McBride 34'; Blanco 63'	Stadium: Gillette Stadium; Attendance: 7,215; Referee: Paul Ward (Canada)

August 5 SuperLiga Final	Chicago (United States)	1 – 1 (a.e.t.) (3–4 p)	(Mexico) UANL	Bridgeview, Illinois
19:00 UTC−05	Nyarko 10'	Report	Itamar 43'	Stadium: Toyota Park; Attendance: 20,000; Referee: Joel Aguilar (El Salvador)
	Penalties
	Blanco (penalty scored); Banner (penalty missed); Rolfe (penalty scored); Mapp (penalty missed); Woolard (penalty scored)		(penalty scored) Fernández; (penalty missed) Viniegra; (penalty scored) Ayala; (penalty scored) Pulido; (penalty scored) Itamar

=== New England Revolution ===
June 21 SuperLiga group stage	New England (United States)	4–2	(Mexico) Santos Laguna	Foxborough, Massachusetts
18:30 UTC−04	Larentowicz 38'; Mansally 60'; Heaps 63'; Dube 82'	Report	Vuoso 51'; Rodríguez 55'	Stadium: Gillette Stadium; Attendance: 9,512; Referee: Courtney Campbell (Jamaica)

June 24 SuperLiga group stage	New England (United States)	1–1	(United States) Kansas City	Foxborough, Massachusetts
19:00 UTC−04	Dube 45+1'	Report	Barnes 85' (o.g.)	Stadium: Gillette Stadium; Attendance: 5,378; Referee: Jorge Gonzalez

June 28 SuperLiga group stage	New England (United States)	1–0	(Mexico) Atlas	Foxborough, Massachusetts
16:30 UTC−04	Mansally 32'	Report		Stadium: Gillette Stadium; Attendance: 7,411; Referee: Ricardo Cerdas (Costa Rica)

July 15 SuperLiga Semifinal	New England (United States)	1–2	(United States) Chicago	Foxborough, Massachusetts
19:00 UTC−04	Jankauskas 44'	Report	McBride 34'; Blanco 63'	Stadium: Gillette Stadium; Attendance: 7,215; Referee: Paul Ward (Canada)

=== Chivas USA ===
June 20 SuperLiga group stage	Chivas USA (United States)	1–2	(Mexico) UANL	Carson, California
19:00 UTC−07	Lahoud 55'	Report	Pulido 11'; Dueñas 82'	Stadium: Home Depot Center; Attendance: 11,197; Referee: Wálter Quesada (Costa Rica)

June 23 SuperLiga group stage	Chicago (United States)	1–0	(United States) Chivas USA	Bridgeview, Illinois
19:00 UTC−05	Mapp 35'	Report		Stadium: Toyota Park; Attendance: 9,126; Referee: Mark Geiger

June 27 SuperLiga group stage	Chivas USA (United States)	1–1	(Mexico) San Luis	Carson, California
19:00 UTC−07	Harris 89'	Report	Moreno 54' (pen.)	Stadium: Home Depot Center; Attendance: 7,411; Referee: Luis de la Rosa (Panama)

=== Kansas City Wizards ===
June 21 SuperLiga group stage	Kansas City (United States)	0–0	(Mexico) Atlas	St. Louis, Missouri
16:30 UTC−05		Report		Stadium: Hermann Stadium; Attendance: 5,278; Referee: Joel Aguilar (El Salvador)

June 24 SuperLiga group stage	New England (United States)	1–1	(United States) Kansas City	Foxborough, Massachusetts
19:00 UTC−04	Dube 45+1'	Report	Barnes 85' (o.g.)	Stadium: Gillette Stadium; Attendance: 5,378; Referee: Jorge Gonzalez

June 28 SuperLiga group stage	Kansas City (United States)	1–3	(Mexico) Santos Laguna	Kansas City, Kansas
18:30 UTC−05	López 80'	Report	Herrera 61'; Vuoso 74'; Rodríguez 90'	Stadium: CommunityAmerica Ballpark; Attendance: 10,385; Referee: José Molina (Honduras)

=== Los Angeles Galaxy ===
February 18 Pan-Pacific Semifinal	Los Angeles (United States)	2–0	(Japan) Ōita Trinita	Carson, California
20:00 UTC−08	Buddle 44'; Kirovski 53' (pen.)	Report		Stadium: Home Depot Center

February 21 Pan-Pacific Final	Los Angeles (United States)	1 – 1 (a.e.t.) (2–4 p)	(South Korea) Suwon Bluewings	Carson, California
20:00 UTC−08	Magee 89' (pen.)	Report	Franklin 39' (o.g.)	Stadium: Home Depot Center
	Penalties
	Buddle (penalty missed); Klein (penalty scored); Magee (penalty scored); Patterson (penalty missed)		(penalty scored) Edu; (penalty scored) Yang; (penalty scored) Lee; (penalty scored) Choi
