= 2010 CONCACAF Champions League final =

- Event: 2009–10 CONCACAF Champions League
| Cruz Azul | Pachuca |
| (Mexico) | (Mexico) |
| 2 | 2 |
- on aggregate Pachuca won on away goals

First leg
| Cruz Azul | Pachuca |
| 2 | 1 |
- Date: 21 April 2010
- Venue: Estadio Azul, Mexico City
- Referee: Benito Archundia (Mexico)
- Attendance: 16,186

Second leg
| Pachuca | Cruz Azul |
| 1 | 0 |
- Date: 28 April 2010
- Venue: Estadio Hidalgo, Pachuca
- Referee: Marco Antonio Rodríguez (Mexico)
- Attendance: 26,500

The 2010 CONCACAF Champions League final was a two-legged football match-up to determine the 2009–10 CONCACAF Champions League champions. Pachuca won the title with a 1–0 home win against compatriots Cruz Azul in the second leg of the final.

This was the fourth all-Mexican CONCACAF club championship final in the last five years, and the second in a row.

== Rules ==
Like other match-ups in the knockout round, the teams played two games, one at each team's home stadium. If the teams remained tied after 90 minutes of play during the 2nd leg, the away goals rule would be used, but not after a tie enters extra time, and so a tie would be decided by penalty shootout if the aggregate score is level after extra time.

== Road to final ==
Cruz Azul
Round
Pachuca
Main article: 2009–10 CONCACAF Champions League group stage: Group C

| Team | Pld | W | D | L | GF | GA | GD | Pts |
|---|---|---|---|---|---|---|---|---|
| (Mexico) Cruz Azul | 6 | 5 | 1 | 0 | 16 | 4 | +12 | 16 |
| (United States) Columbus Crew | 6 | 2 | 2 | 2 | 5 | 9 | −4 | 8 |
| (Costa Rica) Saprissa | 6 | 1 | 2 | 3 | 6 | 8 | −2 | 5 |
| Puerto Rico Islanders | 6 | 0 | 3 | 3 | 6 | 12 | −6 | 3 |

Group stage
Main article: 2009–10 CONCACAF Champions League group stage: Group A

| Team | Pld | W | D | L | GF | GA | GD | Pts |
|---|---|---|---|---|---|---|---|---|
| (Mexico) Pachuca | 6 | 5 | 0 | 1 | 15 | 4 | +11 | 15 |
| (Panama) Árabe Unido | 6 | 3 | 1 | 2 | 13 | 9 | +4 | 10 |
| (United States) Houston Dynamo | 6 | 2 | 1 | 3 | 9 | 8 | +1 | 7 |
| (El Salvador) Isidro Metapán | 6 | 1 | 0 | 5 | 3 | 19 | −16 | 3 |

Opponent
Result
Legs
Championship round
Opponent
Result
Legs
(Panama) Árabe Unido
4–0
3–0 home; 1–0 away
Quarterfinals
(Guatemala) Comunicaciones
3–2
2–1 home; 1–1 away
(Mexico) UNAM
5–1 (a)
5–0 home; 0–1 away
Semifinals
(Mexico) Toluca
2–1
1–0 home; 1–1 away

== Final summary ==
=== First leg ===
2009–10 CONCACAF Champions League final
21 April 2010
22:00
First leg

| Cruz Azul (Mexico) | 2–1 | (Mexico) Pachuca |
|---|---|---|
| Villa 20'; Rodríguez 24' (o.g.) | Report | Álvarez 69' |

Estadio Azul, Mexico City
Attendance: 16,186
Referee: Benito Archundia (Mexico)

| Cruz Azul | Pachuca |

| GK | 1 | (Mexico) José de Jesús Corona |
| DF | 13 | (Mexico) Melvin Brown |
| DF | 4 | (Mexico) Julio Domínguez | (red card) 79' |
| DF | 16 | (Mexico) Rogelio Chávez | | (substituted off) 88' |
| DF | 15 | (Mexico) Horacio Cervantes |
| MF | 21 | (Mexico) Jaime Lozano |
| MF | 7 | (Paraguay) Cristian Riveros (c) |
| MF | 28 | (Mexico) Héctor Gutiérrez |
| FW | 30 | (Argentina) Emanuel Villa |
| FW | 9 | (Argentina) Maxi Biancucchi | | (substituted off) 67' |
| FW | 27 | (Mexico) Javier Orozco | | (substituted off) 74' |
Substitutes:
| MF | 18 | (Mexico) César Villaluz | (yellow card) 83' | (substituted on) 67' |
| FW | 11 | (Mexico) Mario Ortiz | | (substituted on) 74' |
| DF | 20 | (Mexico) Alejandro Castro | | (substituted on) 88' |
Manager:
(Mexico) Enrique Meza

| GK | 1 | (Colombia) Miguel Calero (c) |
| DF | 2 | (Mexico) Leobardo López | (yellow card) 61' |
| DF | 16 | (Mexico) Carlos Rodríguez |
| DF | 5 | (Mexico) Gregorio Torres | | (substituted off) 84' |
| DF | 12 | (Mexico) Juan Rojas |
| MF | 7 | (Argentina) Damián Álvarez |
| MF | 24 | (Mexico) Raúl Martínez | (yellow card) 74' |
| MF | 27 | (Mexico) Edy Brambila | (yellow card) 36' | (substituted off) 60' |
| MF | 18 | (United States) José Francisco Torres |
| FW | 9 | (Mexico) Ulises Mendivil | | (substituted off) 32' |
| FW | 10 | (Paraguay) Edgar Benítez |
Substitutes:
| MF | 21 | (Argentina) Damián Manso | | (substituted on) 32' |
| FW | 11 | (Mexico) Juan Carlos Cacho | | (substituted on) 60' |
| MF | 15 | (Mexico) Luis Montes | | (substituted on) 84' |
Manager:
(Argentina) Guillermo Rivarola

Assistant referees:
(Mexico) Marvin Torrentera
(Mexico) Hector Delgadillo
Fourth official:
(Mexico) Mauricio Morales

=== Second leg ===
28 April 2010
20:00
Second leg

| Pachuca (Mexico) | 1–0 | (Mexico) Cruz Azul |
|---|---|---|
| Benítez 90+3' | Report |

Estadio Hidalgo, Pachuca
Attendance: 26,500
Referee: Marco Antonio Rodríguez (Mexico)

| Pachuca | Cruz Azul |

| GK | 1 | (Colombia) Miguel Calero (c) |
| DF | 4 | (Mexico) Marco Pérez |
| DF | 26 | (Argentina) Javier Muñoz |
| DF | 16 | (Mexico) Carlos Rodríguez |
| DF | 12 | (Mexico) Juan Rojas | | (substituted off) 88' |
| MF | 7 | (Argentina) Damián Álvarez |
| MF | 24 | (Mexico) Raúl Martínez |
| MF | 18 | (United States) José Francisco Torres | | (substituted off) 81' |
| MF | 21 | (Argentina) Damián Manso |
| FW | 19 | (Argentina) Darío Cvitanich | (yellow card) 6' | (substituted off) 55' |
| FW | 10 | (Paraguay) Edgar Benítez | (yellow card) 90' |
Substitutes:
| FW | 9 | (Mexico) Ulises Mendivil | | (substituted on) 55' |
| FW | 29 | (Mexico) Víctor Mañon | | (substituted on) 81' |
| DF | 3 | (Mexico) Pedro Cortéz | | (substituted on) 88' |
Manager:
(Argentina) Guillermo Rivarola

| GK | 1 | (Mexico) José de Jesús Corona |
| DF | 2 | (Mexico) Fausto Pinto |
| DF | 13 | (Mexico) Melvin Brown |
| DF | 15 | (Mexico) Horacio Cervantes |
| DF | 20 | (Mexico) Alejandro Castro | (substituted off) 78' |
| MF | 21 | (Mexico) Jaime Lozano |
| MF | 7 | (Paraguay) Cristian Riveros (c) |
| MF | 28 | (Mexico) Héctor Gutiérrez |
| FW | 30 | (Argentina) Emanuel Villa |
| FW | 9 | (Argentina) Maxi Biancucchi | (substituted off) 61' |
| FW | 27 | (Mexico) Javier Orozco | (substituted off) 69' |
Substitutes:
| MF | 23 | (Mexico) Edgar Lugo | (substituted on) 61' |
| FW | 19 | (Mexico) Alejandro Vela | (substituted on) 69' |
| DF | 16 | (Mexico) Rogelio Chávez | (substituted on) 78' |
Manager:
(Mexico) Enrique Meza

Assistant referees:
(Mexico) José Camargo
(Mexico) Marcos Quintero
Fourth official:
(Mexico) Roberto Garcia Orozco
