= 2009–10 CONCACAF Champions League preliminary round =

The 2009–10 CONCACAF Champions League preliminary round was the first round of the 2009–10 CONCACAF Champions League. Sixteen teams were entered in this round, and were drawn into eight matchups that were contested in a two-legged tie. The first leg of each of the preliminary round matchups was played July 28–30, 2009, and the second leg was played August 4–6. This tournament's preliminary round was scheduled to begin one month earlier than the previous season in order to alleviate schedule congestion for participants due to fourth round of CONCACAF qualification for the 2010 FIFA World Cup. The matchup draw for the preliminary and group stages was conducted on June 11. The match schedule was announced five days later on June 16.

== Matches ==
| Team 1 | Agg. | Team 2 | 1st leg | 2nd leg |
|---|---|---|---|---|
| San Francisco (Panama) | 2–3 | (Trinidad and Tobago) San Juan Jabloteh | 2–0 | 0–3 |
| Pachuca (Mexico) | 10–1 | (Guatemala) Jalapa | 3–0 | 7–1 |
| W Connection (Trinidad and Tobago) | 4–3 | (United States) New York Red Bulls | 2–2 | 2–1 |
| Olimpia (Honduras) | 2–2 (a) | (Panama) Árabe Unido | 2–1 | 0–1 |
| Herediano (Costa Rica) | 2–6 | (Mexico) Cruz Azul | 2–6 | 0–0 |
| D.C. United (United States) | 2–2 (5–4 p) | (El Salvador) Luis Ángel Firpo | 1–1 | 1–1 (aet) |
| Liberia Mía (Costa Rica) | 3–6 | (Honduras) Real España | 3–0 | 0–6 |
| Toronto FC (Canada) | 0–1 | Puerto Rico Islanders | 0–1 | 0–0 |

All match-times are listed in local time.

=== First leg ===
July 28, 2009
20:00 EDT (UTC-4)

| D.C. United (United States) | 1–1 | (El Salvador) Luis Ángel Firpo |
|---|---|---|
| Moreno 42' (pen.) | Report | Benítez 26' |

RFK Stadium, Washington, D.C.
Attendance: 8,026
Referee: Paúl Delgadillo (Mexico)

July 28, 2009
21:00 CDT (UTC-5)

| Pachuca (Mexico) | 3–0 | (Guatemala) Jalapa |
|---|---|---|
| Cacho 42'; Caballero 57'; Giménez 76' | Report |

Estadio Hidalgo, Pachuca
Attendance: 10,000
Referee: Mark Geiger (United States)

July 29, 2009
20:00 EDT (UTC-4)

| Toronto FC (Canada) | 0–1 | Puerto Rico Islanders |
|---|---|---|
| | Report | Jagdeosingh 67' |

BMO Field, Toronto
Attendance: 20,758
Referee: Hugo Cruz (Costa Rica)

July 29, 2009
19:00 EST (UTC-5)

| San Francisco (Panama) | 2–0 | (Trinidad and Tobago) San Juan Jabloteh |
|---|---|---|
| Vilarete 5' (pen.); Pérez 83' | Report |

Estadio Agustín Muquita Sánchez, La Chorrera
Attendance: 2,600
Referee: Walter López (Guatemala)

July 29, 2009
20:00 CST (UTC-6)

| Liberia Mía (Costa Rica) | 3–0 | (Honduras) Real España |
|---|---|---|
| Umaña 31' (pen.); Alpízar 75', 90' | Report |

Estadio Alejandro Morera Soto, Alajuela
Attendance: 675
Referee: José Rivera (El Salvador)

July 30, 2009
20:00 ECT (UTC-4)

| W Connection (Trinidad and Tobago) | 2–2 | (United States) New York Red Bulls |
|---|---|---|
| Faña 40'; Hector 72' | Report | Öbster 47'; Joseph 60' (o.g.) |

Manny Ramjohn Stadium, Marabella
Attendance: 6,500
Referee: Raymond Bogle (Jamaica)

July 30, 2009
20:00 CST (UTC-6)

| Herediano (Costa Rica) | 2–6 | (Mexico) Cruz Azul |
|---|---|---|
| Herron 59'; Guity 76' | Report | Vela 2'; Orozco 50', 57', 74'; Villa 70'; Zeballos 88' |

Estadio Eladio Rosabal Cordero, Heredia
Attendance: 1,237
Referee: José Pineda (Honduras)

July 30, 2009
20:00 CST (UTC-6)

| Olimpia (Honduras) | 2–1 | (Panama) Árabe Unido |
|---|---|---|
| Nascimento 48' (pen.); Ferreira 56' | Report | Rodríguez 18' |

Estadio Tiburcio Carías Andino, Tegucigalpa
Attendance: 2,000
Referee: Joel Aguilar (El Salvador)

=== Second leg ===
August 4, 2009
20:00 AST (UTC-4)

| Puerto Rico Islanders | 0–0 | (Canada) Toronto FC |
|---|---|---|
| | Report |

Juan Ramón Loubriel Stadium, Bayamón
Attendance: 6,000
Referee: Geoffrey Hospedales (Trinidad and Tobago)

Puerto Rico Islanders won 1–0 on aggregate.

August 4, 2009
20:00 CST (UTC-6)

| Jalapa (Guatemala) | 1–7 | (Mexico) Pachuca |
|---|---|---|
| Piñeyro 43' (pen.) | Report | Giménez 4'; Mendivil 13', 36', 77'; Aguilar 50'; Benitez 64'; Caballero 86' |

Estadio Las Flores, Jalapa
Attendance: 1,861
Referee: Wálter Quesada (Costa Rica)

Pachuca won 10–1 on aggregate.

August 4, 2009
20:00 CST (UTC-6)

| Luis Ángel Firpo (El Salvador) | 1–1 (a.e.t.) | (United States) D.C. United |
|---|---|---|
| Franco 39' (pen.) | Report | Gómez 42' |
Penalties
| Alas (penalty scored); J. Sánchez (penalty scored); Merino (penalty scored); Salazar (penalty missed); C. Sánchez (penalty scored) | 4–5 | (penalty scored) Pontius; (penalty scored) Szetela; (penalty scored) Olsen; (penalty scored) Burch; (penalty scored) Gómez |

Estadio Cuscatlán, San Salvador
Attendance: 11,000
Referee: Óscar Moncada (Honduras)

2–2 on aggregate. D.C. United won 5–4 on penalties.

August 5, 2009
20:00 EDT (UTC-4)

| New York Red Bulls (United States) | 1–2 | (Trinidad and Tobago) W Connection |
|---|---|---|
| Wolyniec 19' | Report | Toussaint 40', 45' |

Giants Stadium, East Rutherford
Attendance: 6,549
Referee: Paul Ward (Canada)

W Connection won 4–3 on aggregate.

August 5, 2009
21:00 CDT (UTC-5)

| Cruz Azul (Mexico) | 0–0 | (Costa Rica) Herediano |
|---|---|---|
| | Report |

Estadio Azul, Mexico City
Attendance: 4,311
Referee: Terry Vaughn (United States)

Cruz Azul won 6–2 on aggregate.

August 6, 2009
19:00 EST (UTC-5)

| Árabe Unido (Panama) | 1–0 | (Honduras) Olimpia |
|---|---|---|
| Mendieta 27' | Report |

Estadio Agustín Sánchez, La Chorrera
Attendance: 850
Referee: Roberto García (Mexico)

2–2 on aggregate. Árabe Unido won on away goals.

August 6, 2009
20:00 ECT (UTC-4)

| San Juan Jabloteh (Trinidad and Tobago) | 3–0 | (Panama) San Francisco |
|---|---|---|
| Sam 30'; Oliver 62', 76' | Report |

Hasely Crawford Stadium, Port of Spain
Attendance: 2,000
Referee: Stanley Lancaster (Guyana)

San Juan Jabloteh won 3–2 on aggregate.

August 6, 2009
20:00 CST (UTC-6)

| Real España (Honduras) | 6–0 | (Costa Rica) Liberia Mía |
|---|---|---|
| Mattoso 4', 90+'; Pavón 18', 73', 80'; Peña 47' | Report |

Estadio Francisco Morazán, San Pedro Sula
Attendance: 1,500
Referee: Roberto Moreno (Panama)

Real España won 6–3 on aggregate.
