= Manuel Salazar =

Manuel Salazar may refer to:

- Manuel Salazar (actor) (born 1956), Venezuelan actor
- Manuel Salazar (footballer) (born 1986), Salvadoran footballer
- Manuel Salazar y Baquíjano (1777–1850), President of Peru
- Manuel Salazar (artist) (born 1966), Mexican-American artist
- Manuel Salazar (gymnast) (born 1977), Mexican artistic gymnast
