= 2008–09 Primera División (Costa Rica) =

Campeonato Scotiabank
- Season: 2008–09
- Champions: -
- Relegated: -
- -: -

The Invierno 2008–09 season started on July 27 with 2 groups of 6 teams, they will play twice (home and away) with the teams of their own group (10 games) and once with the teams of the other group (6 games), for a total of 16 games. The 3 top teams of each group qualify for the playoffs. The winners of group A and B get a bye week, while the 2nd of group A plays the 3rd of group B and the 2nd of group B plays the 3rd of group A. The winners of these series move to the semi-final series.

The home field advantage in the playoffs is given to the team with the best record in the group stage.

The winner of the playoff series will gain entry into the group stage of the 2009–10 CONCACAF Champions League. The runner-up will gain entry into the 2009-10 CONCACAF Champions League preliminary round. If the same team wins both the Invierno and Verano tournaments then the preliminary round spot will be awarded to the team with the next best regular season record in the Verano tournament.

== Invierno 2008 ==
=== Group stage ===
Group A
| Pos | Team | Pld | W | D | L | GF | GA | GD | Pts | Qualification |
|---|---|---|---|---|---|---|---|---|---|---|
| 1 | Saprissa | 16 | 8 | 5 | 3 | 30 | 15 | +15 | 29 | Qualified to the semifinals |
| 2 | Brujas | 16 | 8 | 4 | 4 | 33 | 22 | +11 | 28 | Qualified to the quarterfinals |
| 3 | Liberia Mía | 16 | 7 | 3 | 6 | 30 | 32 | −2 | 24 | Qualified to the quarterfinals |
| 4 | Puntarenas F.C. | 16 | 6 | 3 | 7 | 22 | 27 | −5 | 21 | |
| 5 | Ramonense | 16 | 3 | 6 | 7 | 19 | 31 | −12 | 15 | |
| 6 | Carmelita | 16 | 0 | 9 | 7 | 21 | 34 | −13 | 9 | |

Group B
| Pos | Team | Pld | W | D | L | GF | GA | GD | Pts | Qualification |
|---|---|---|---|---|---|---|---|---|---|---|
| 1 | Alajuelense | 16 | 7 | 6 | 3 | 24 | 18 | +6 | 27 | Qualified to the semifinals |
| 2 | Pérez Zeledón | 16 | 7 | 5 | 4 | 23 | 19 | +4 | 26 | |
| 3 | San Carlos | 16 | 7 | 3 | 6 | 27 | 25 | +2 | 24 | |
| 4 | Herediano | 16 | 6 | 4 | 6 | 21 | 20 | +1 | 22 | |
| 5 | Universidad de Costa Rica | 16 | 4 | 5 | 7 | 18 | 23 | −5 | 17 | |
| 6 | Cartaginés | 16 | 3 | 7 | 6 | 16 | 18 | −2 | 16 | |

Source: Qualified to the quarterfinals

=== Playoffs ===
Quarterfinals
A2 | Brujas | 0 | 1 | 1
B3 | San Carlos | 2 | 1 | 3
B2 | Pérez Zeledón | 2 | 0(4PK) | 2
A3 | Liberia Mía | 2 | 0(3PK) | 2

Semifinals
B1 | Alajuelense | 1 | 3 | 4
B3 | San Carlos | 2 | 1 | 3
A1 | Deportivo Saprissa | 1 | 4 | 5
B2 | Pérez Zeledón | 1 | 2 | 3

Finals
B1 | Alajuelense | 2 | 0 | 2
A1 | Deportivo Saprissa | 0 | 3 | 3

Invierno 2008 winners
Saprissa

== Verano 2009 ==
=== Group stage ===
Group A
| Pos | Team | Pld | W | D | L | GF | GA | GD | Pts | Qualification |
|---|---|---|---|---|---|---|---|---|---|---|
| 1 | Brujas | 16 | 7 | 5 | 4 | 21 | 14 | +7 | 26 | Qualified to the semifinals |
| 2 | Liberia Mía | 16 | 7 | 5 | 4 | 19 | 16 | +3 | 26 | Qualified to the quarterfinals |
| 3 | Ramonense | 16 | 6 | 5 | 5 | 22 | 19 | +3 | 23 | Qualified to the quarterfinals |
| 4 | Puntarenas F.C. | 16 | 5 | 6 | 5 | 18 | 21 | −3 | 21 | |
| 5 | Carmelita | 16 | 3 | 5 | 8 | 14 | 24 | −10 | 14 | |
| 6 | Alajuelense | 16 | 3 | 4 | 9 | 14 | 22 | −8 | 13 | |

Group B
| Pos | Team | Pld | W | D | L | GF | GA | GD | Pts | Qualification |
|---|---|---|---|---|---|---|---|---|---|---|
| 1 | Saprissa | 16 | 10 | 3 | 3 | 26 | 13 | +13 | 33 | Qualified to the semifinals |
| 2 | Herediano | 16 | 9 | 3 | 4 | 22 | 15 | +7 | 30 | Qualified to the quarterfinals |
| 3 | Pérez Zeledón | 16 | 6 | 5 | 5 | 19 | 17 | +2 | 23 | Qualified to the quarterfinals |
| 4 | Cartaginés | 16 | 5 | 8 | 3 | 13 | 11 | +2 | 23 | |
| 5 | San Carlos | 16 | 4 | 6 | 6 | 18 | 17 | +1 | 18 | |
| 6 | Universidad de Costa Rica | 16 | 3 | 1 | 12 | 11 | 28 | −17 | 10 | |

=== Playoffs ===
Quarterfinals
A2 | Liberia Mía | 2 | 1 | 3
B3 | Pérez Zeledón | 1 | 0 | 1
B2 | Herediano | 1 | 2 | 3
A3 | Ramonense | 0 | 2 | 2

Semifinals
B1 | Saprissa | 1 | 0 | 1
A2 | Liberia Mía | 1 | 1 | 2
A1 | Brujas | 1 | 1 | 2
B2 | Herediano | 3 | 3 | 6

Finals
A2 | Liberia Mía | 0 | 3 | 3
B2 | Herediano | 0 | 0 | 0

Verano 2009 winners
Liberia Mía

== Aggregate Table ==
| Pos | Team | Pld | W | D | L | GF | GA | GD | Pts |
|---|---|---|---|---|---|---|---|---|---|
| 1 | Saprissa | 32 | 18 | 8 | 6 | 56 | 28 | +28 | 62 |
| 2 | Brujas | 32 | 15 | 9 | 8 | 54 | 36 | +18 | 54 |
| 3 | Herediano | 32 | 15 | 7 | 10 | 43 | 35 | +8 | 52 |
| 4 | Liberia Mía | 32 | 14 | 8 | 10 | 49 | 48 | +1 | 50 |
| 5 | Pérez Zeledón | 31 | 12 | 10 | 9 | 42 | 36 | +6 | 46 |
| 6 | San Carlos | 32 | 11 | 9 | 12 | 45 | 42 | +3 | 42 |
| 7 | Puntarenas F.C. | 32 | 11 | 9 | 12 | 40 | 48 | −8 | 42 |
| 8 | Alajuelense | 32 | 10 | 10 | 12 | 38 | 40 | −2 | 40 |
| 9 | Cartaginés | 32 | 8 | 15 | 9 | 29 | 29 | 0 | 39 |
| 10 | Ramonense | 32 | 9 | 11 | 12 | 41 | 50 | −9 | 38 |
| 11 | UCR | 32 | 7 | 6 | 19 | 29 | 51 | −22 | 27 |
| 12 | Carmelita | 32 | 3 | 14 | 15 | 35 | 58 | −23 | 23 |

- Saprissa earned CRC1 spot in 2009–10 CONCACAF Champions League.
- Liberia Mía earned CRC2 spot in 2009–10 CONCACAF Champions League.
- Herediano earned CRC3 spot in 2009–10 CONCACAF Champions League (berth reallocated from Nicaragua).

== Top goalscorers ==
| Goalscorers | Goals | Team |
|---|---|---|
| (Dominican Republic) (Costa Rica) Victor Núñez | 8 | Liberia Mía |
| (Costa Rica) Alejandro Alpízar | 5 | Saprissa |
| (France) Jacques Rémy | 5 | Liberia Mía |
| (Costa Rica) Mauricio Solís | 5 | Herediano |
| (Argentina) Diego País | 4 | Pérez Zeledón |
| (Costa Rica) Mario Camacho | 4 | Puntarenas F.C. |
| (Costa Rica) Keylor Soto | 4 | Brujas |
| (Costa Rica) Alejandro Sequeira | 4 | Ramonense |
| (Costa Rica) Esteban Santana | 3 | Carmelita |
| (Costa Rica) Windell Gabriels | 3 | Alajuelense |
