= 2009–10 CONCACAF Champions League =

45th edition of premier club football tournament organized by CONCACAF

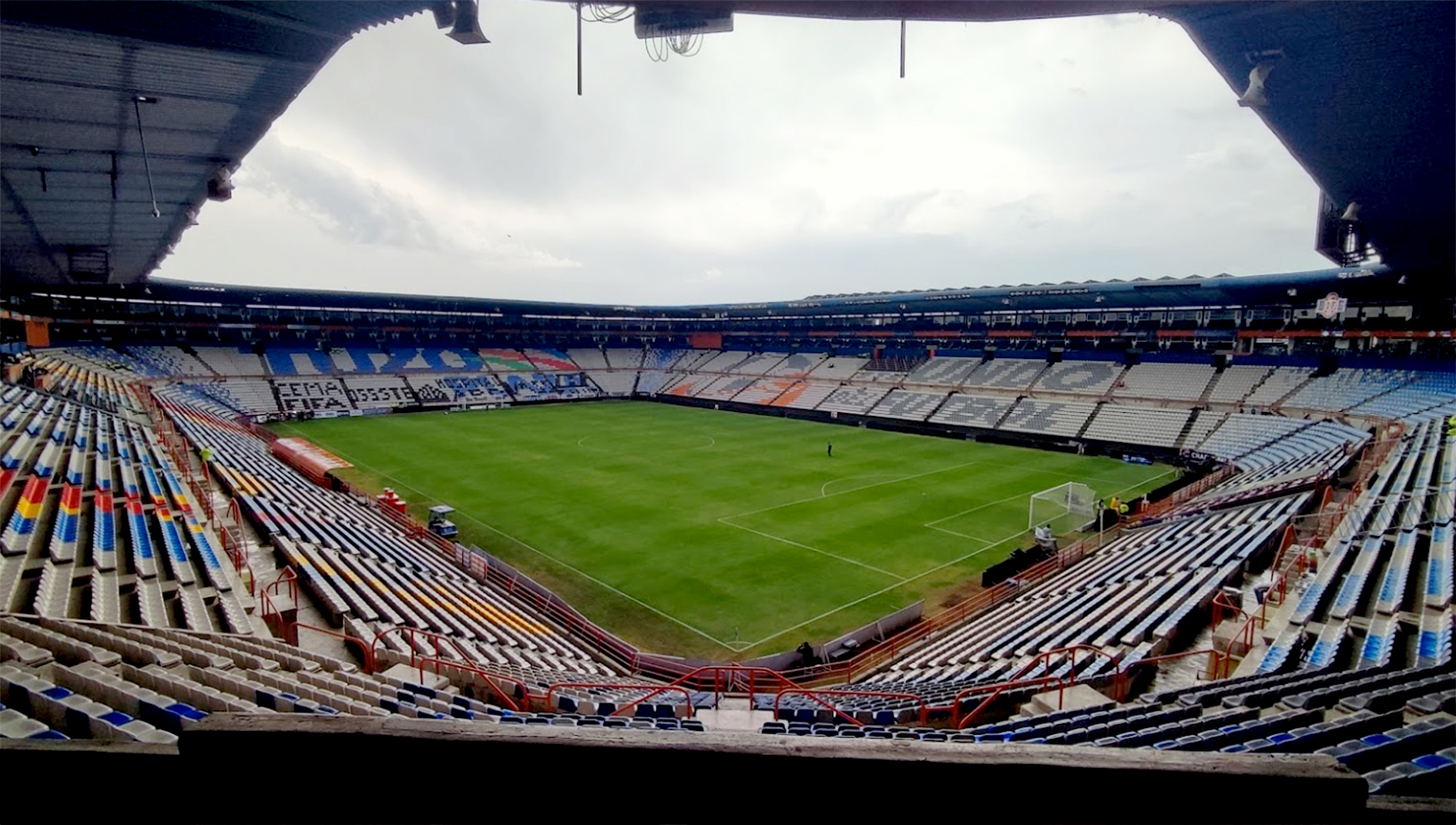
- Estadio Hidalgo in Pachuca hosted the second leg Final

Tournament details
- Dates: July 28, 2009 – April 28, 2010
- Teams: 24 (from 10 associations)

Final positions
- Champions: (Mexico) Pachuca (4th title)
- Runners-up: (Mexico) Cruz Azul

Tournament statistics
- Matches played: 78
- Goals scored: 242 (3.1 per match)
- Attendance: 530,883 (6,806 per match)
- Top scorer(s): (Mexico) Ulises Mendivil (9 goals)

The 2009–10 CONCACAF Champions League was the second edition of the CONCACAF Champions League.Under its current format, and overall, it was the 45th edition of the premier football club competition organized by CONCACAF, the regional governing body of North America, Central America and the Caribbean.

The tournament began on July 28, 2009, and ran through April 28, 2010. All four Mexican teams topped their groups and reached the semi-finals, with Pachuca winning the final against Cruz Azul with a 2–2 aggregate score, via the away goals rule. As winners, Pachuca qualified for the 2010 FIFA Club World Cup as the CONCACAF representative. Atlante are the defending champions, but failed to qualify and cannot defend titles.

== Qualification ==
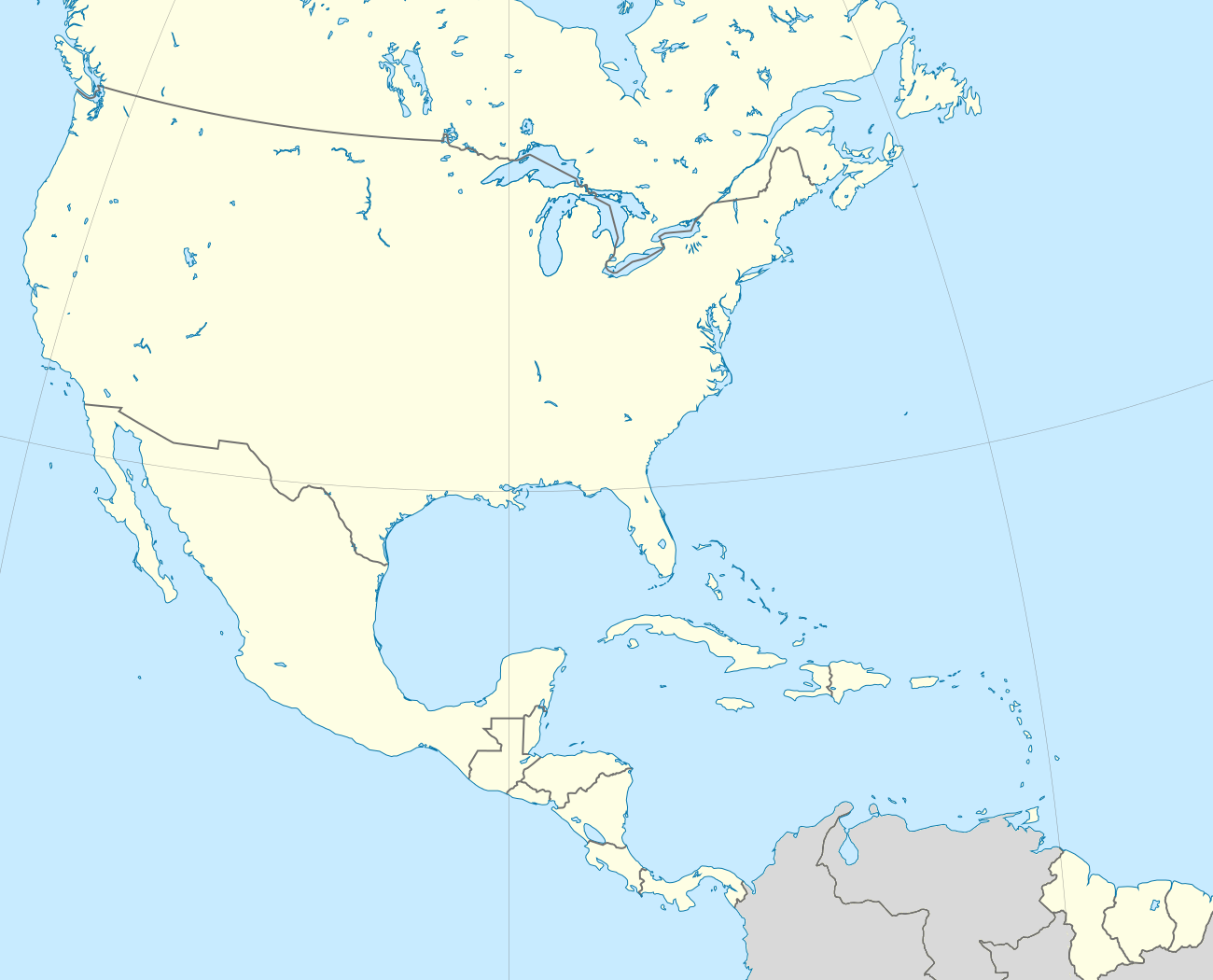
Location of teams of the 2009–10 CONCACAF Champions League
Brown: Group A; Red: Group B; Orange: Group C; Yellow: Group D.

24 teams participated in the 2009–10 CONCACAF Champions League from the North American, Central American, and Caribbean zones. Nine of the teams came from North America, twelve from Central America, and three from the Caribbean. However, after problems in the previous year's tournament, CONCACAF decided that teams may be disqualified and replaced if they don't have a stadium for the tournament that CONCACAF deems suitable.

- Central America: 12 Central American clubs can qualify to the Champions League. If one or more clubs is precluded, it will be supplanted by a club from another Central American federation. The reallocation would be based on results from the 2008–09 CONCACAF Champions League.
- Caribbean: If any Caribbean club is precluded, it will be supplanted by the "2009 CFU Club Championship" 4th-place finisher.

Also, in response to fixture congestion during the previous year's tournament, the Central American representatives that qualify via split seasons will no longer play-off solely to determine which team will gain entry into the group stage. In nations that regularly play a playoff to determine a national champion, these will continue as usual. For those that don't, total points over both seasons, followed by other tiebreakers, will determine which team enters the group stage without playing extra matches.

=== Reallocation of bids ===
It was announced on May 12, 2009, that Belize had lost their lone qualification to Honduras due to the inability of the Belize federation to meet CONCACAF's minimum requirements in regard to stadium facilities. The spot vacated by Belize was awarded to Honduras, increasing their total to three qualified clubs, due to their association's teams' superior performance in the 2008–09 Champions League.

A second bid was reallocated on June 9 when it was determined that Real Estelí of Nicaragua did not have a suitable venue to host a CONCACAF club match. The Nicaraguan bid was initially intended to be given to a third team from Panama, but Panama only had one stadium pass inspection, which under CONCACAF rules, meant that only two Panamanian clubs could host matches. Thus, the bid was awarded to a third team from Costa Rica, Herediano, the highest non-champion from the combined 2008 Invierno and 2009 Verano seasons. Initially, there was a tie between Costa Rica, El Salvador, and Guatemala, based upon the results of the 2008–09 Champions League, for the reallocated Nicaraguan bid. Therefore, CONCACAF officials drew on results from previous CONCACAF tournaments in order to break the tie, which proved Costa Rica to historically have the strongest representation.

On July 10, 2009 CONCACAF announced that Luís Ángel Firpo of El Salvador was invited to take the place of Chalatenango due to Chalatengo's failure to sign and return the required participation agreement. Firpo was selected as the team with the second-best cumulative record among the runners-up in the El Salvadoran Apertura and Clausura championships.

=== Teams ===
Teams in bold qualify directly for the group stage.

Association	Club	Qualifying method
North America (9 teams)
(Mexico) Mexico; 4 berths	**Toluca**	2008 Apertura champions
(Mexico) Mexico; 4 berths	**UNAM**	2009 Clausura champions
(Mexico) Mexico; 4 berths	Cruz Azul	2008 Apertura runners-up
(Mexico) Mexico; 4 berths	Pachuca	2009 Clausura runners-up
(United States) United States; 4 berths	**Columbus Crew**	2008 MLS Cup and 2008 MLS Supporters' Shield winner
(United States) United States; 4 berths	**Houston Dynamo**	2008 MLS Supporters' Shield runners-up^{1}
(United States) United States; 4 berths	New York Red Bulls	2008 MLS Cup runners-up
(United States) United States; 4 berths	D.C. United	2008 U.S. Open Cup champions
(Canada) Canada; 1 berth	Toronto FC	2009 Canadian Championship winner
Central America (12 teams)
(Costa Rica) Costa Rica; 3 berths	**Saprissa**	2008 Invierno champions
(Costa Rica) Costa Rica; 3 berths	Liberia Mía	2009 Verano champions
(Costa Rica) Costa Rica; 3 berths	Herediano	2009 Verano runners-up^{2}
(Honduras) Honduras; 3 berths	**Marathón**	2008 Apertura champions
(Honduras) Honduras; 3 berths	Olimpia	2009 Clausura champions
(Honduras) Honduras; 3 berths	Real España	2008 Apertura and 2009 Clausura runners-up^{3}
(Guatemala) Guatemala; 2 berths	**Comunicaciones**	2008 Apertura champions
(Guatemala) Guatemala; 2 berths	Jalapa	2009 Clausura champions
(El Salvador) El Salvador; 2 berths	**Isidro Metapán**	2008 Apertura and 2009 Clausura champions
(El Salvador) El Salvador; 2 berths	Luis Ángel Firpo	2009 Clausura runners-up^{4}
(Panama) Panama; 2 berths	Árabe Unido	2008 Clausura champions
(Panama) Panama; 2 berths	San Francisco	2009 Apertura champions
Caribbean (3 teams)
Trinidad and Tobago	W Connection	2009 CFU Club Championship champions
Trinidad and Tobago	San Juan Jabloteh	2009 CFU Club Championship third place
Puerto Rico	Puerto Rico Islanders	2009 CFU Club Championship runners-up

^{1} Columbus Crew were both the 2008 MLS Supporters' Shield and 2008 MLS Cup winner, so Houston Dynamo claimed the second USA berth in the group stage as the 2008 MLS Supporters' Shield runners-up.

^{2} Berth originally awarded to Nicaragua (Real Estelí), was rescinded after a failed stadium inspection by CONCACAF officials. The berth was awarded to Costa Rica.

^{3} Berth originally awarded to Belize (Belize Defence Force), but Belize failed the CONCACAF stadium requirements. The berth was awarded to Honduras.

^{4} Isidro Metapán won both the 2008 Apertura and 2009 Clausura. As a result, the second Salvadoran bid was awarded to the runners-up in the Apertura and Clausura tournaments with the better aggregate record, Chalatenango (2008 Apertura runners-up). When Chalatenango failed to file the required participation agreement, the runners-up with the second-best aggregate record were invited.

== Format ==
There will be a two-legged preliminary round for 16 clubs, with the eight winners advancing to the group stage. The other eight qualified teams will be seeded directly into the group stage. The clubs involved in the group stage will be placed into four groups of four with each team playing the others in its group in both home and away matches. The top two teams from each group will advance to the championship round, which will consist of two-legged ties. The final round, to be held in late April 2010, will also be two-legged. The away goals rule will be used but will not apply once a tie enters extra time.

Group Stage
Pot A	(Mexico) Toluca	(Mexico) UNAM	(United States) Columbus Crew	(United States) Houston Dynamo
Pot B	(Costa Rica) Saprissa	(Honduras) Marathón	(Guatemala) Comunicaciones	(El Salvador) Isidro Metapán
Preliminary round
Pot A	(Mexico) Cruz Azul	(Mexico) Pachuca	(United States) New York Red Bulls	(United States) D.C. United
Pot A	(Costa Rica) Liberia Mía	(Honduras) Olimpia	(Panama) San Francisco	(Canada) Toronto FC
Pot B	(Honduras) Real España	(El Salvador) Luis Ángel Firpo	(Guatemala) Jalapa	(Panama) Árabe Unido
Pot B	(Costa Rica) Herediano	(Trinidad and Tobago) W Connection	Puerto Rico Islanders	(Trinidad and Tobago) San Juan Jabloteh

== Schedule ==
Round		Draw date	First leg	Second leg
Preliminary round	Preliminary	June 11, 2009 (New York, United States)	July 28–30, 2009	August 4–6, 2009
Group Stage	Matchday 1	June 11, 2009 (New York, United States)	August 18–20, 2009	
Group Stage	Matchday 2	June 11, 2009 (New York, United States)	August 25–27, 2009	
Group Stage	Matchday 3	June 11, 2009 (New York, United States)	September 15–17, 2009	
Group Stage	Matchday 4	June 11, 2009 (New York, United States)	September 22–24, 2009	
Group Stage	Matchday 5	June 11, 2009 (New York, United States)	September 29-October 1, 2009	
Group Stage	Matchday 6	June 11, 2009 (New York, United States)	October 20–22, 2009	
Championship round	Quarterfinals	November 17, 2009	March 9–11, 2010	March 16–18, 2010
Championship round	Semifinals	November 17, 2009	March 30–31, 2010	April 6–7, 2010
Championship round	Final	November 17, 2009	April 21, 2010	April 28, 2010

== Preliminary round ==
The draw for the preliminary round was held on June 11, 2009, at the CONCACAF headquarters in New York City. The first legs of the preliminary round were played the week of July 28, 2009, while the second legs were played the week of August 4, 2009; this is a month earlier than the previous season. The preliminary round schedule was announced on June 16, five days after the draw.

Team 1	Agg.	Team 2	1st leg	2nd leg
San Francisco (Panama)	2–3	(Trinidad and Tobago) San Juan Jabloteh	2–0	0–3
Pachuca (Mexico)	10–1	(Guatemala) Jalapa	3–0	7–1
W Connection (Trinidad and Tobago)	4–3	(United States) New York Red Bulls	2–2	2–1
Olimpia (Honduras)	2–2 (a)	(Panama) Árabe Unido	2–1	0–1
Herediano (Costa Rica)	2–6	(Mexico) Cruz Azul	2–6	0–0
D.C. United (United States)	2–2 (5–4 p)	(El Salvador) Luis Ángel Firpo	1–1	1–1 (aet)
Liberia Mía (Costa Rica)	3–6	(Honduras) Real España	3–0	0–6
Toronto FC (Canada)	0–1	Puerto Rico Islanders	0–1	0–0

== Group stage ==
The Group Stage was played in 6 rounds during August–October 2009. The rounds were August 18–20, August 25–27, September 15–17, September 22–24, September 29–October 1, and October 20–22.

=== Group A ===
Team	Pld	W	D	L	GF	GA	GD	Pts
(Mexico) Pachuca	6	5	0	1	15	4	+11	15
(Panama) Árabe Unido	6	3	1	2	13	9	+4	10
(United States) Houston Dynamo	6	2	1	3	9	8	+1	7
(El Salvador) Isidro Metapán	6	1	0	5	3	19	−16	3

	ARA	HOU	MET	PAC
Árabe Unido	–	1–1	6–0	4–1
Houston Dynamo	5–1	–	1–0	0–1
Isidro Metapán	0–1	3–2	–	0–4
Pachuca	2–0	2–0	5–0	–

=== Group B ===
Team	Pld	W	D	L	GF	GA	GD	Pts
(Mexico) Toluca	6	4	1	1	15	4	+11	13
(Honduras) Marathón	6	4	0	2	12	14	−2	12
(United States) D.C. United	6	3	1	2	12	8	+4	10
(Trinidad and Tobago) San Juan Jabloteh	6	0	0	6	4	17	−13	0

	DCU	MAR	SJJ	TOL
D.C. United	–	3–0	5–1	1–3
Marathón	3–1	–	3–1	2–0
San Juan Jabloteh	0–1	2–4	–	0–1
Toluca	1–1	7–0	3–0	–

=== Group C ===
Team	Pld	W	D	L	GF	GA	GD	Pts
(Mexico) Cruz Azul	6	5	1	0	16	4	+12	16
(United States) Columbus Crew	6	2	2	2	5	9	−4	8
(Costa Rica) Saprissa	6	1	2	3	6	8	−2	5
Puerto Rico Islanders	6	0	3	3	6	12	−6	3

	CLB	CRU	PRI	SAP
Columbus Crew	–	0–2	2–0	1–1
Cruz Azul	5–0	–	2–0	2–0
P. R. Islanders	1–1	3–3	–	1–1
Saprissa	0–1	1–2	3–1	–

=== Group D ===
Team	Pld	W	D	L	GF	GA	GD	Pts
(Mexico) UNAM	6	4	1	1	15	6	+9	13
(Guatemala) Comunicaciones	6	3	0	3	6	8	−2	9
(Trinidad and Tobago) W Connection	6	2	1	3	10	9	+1	7
(Honduras) Real España	6	2	0	4	6	14	−8	6

	COM	RES	UNAM	WCO
Comunicaciones	–	2–0	2–1	0–3
Real España	2–0	–	1–5	1–0
UNAM	1–0	4–0	–	2–1
W Connection	1–2	3–2	2–2	–

== Championship round ==
The championship round draw was conducted on November 17.

=== Bracket ===
Quarterfinals
(Honduras) Marathón	2	1	3
(Mexico) UNAM	0	6	6
(Panama) Árabe Unido	0	0	0
(Mexico) Cruz Azul	1	3	4
(United States) Columbus Crew	2	2	4
(Mexico) Toluca	2	3	5
(Guatemala) Comunicaciones	1	1	2
(Mexico) Pachuca	1	2	3

Semifinals
(Mexico) UNAM	1	0	1
(Mexico) Cruz Azul	0	5	5
(Mexico) Toluca	1	0	1
(Mexico) Pachuca	1	1	2

Finals
(Mexico) Cruz Azul	2	0	2
(Mexico) Pachuca (a)	1	1	2

Each of the Championship rounds will be played over two legs.

=== Quarterfinals ===
The first legs of the quarterfinals were played the week of March 9, 2010, while the second legs were played the week of March 16, 2010.

Team 1	Agg.	Team 2	1st leg	2nd leg
Comunicaciones (Guatemala)	2–3	(Mexico) Pachuca	1–1	1–2
Columbus Crew (United States)	4–5	(Mexico) Toluca	2–2	2–3
Marathón (Honduras)	3–6	(Mexico) UNAM	2–0	1–6
Árabe Unido (Panama)	0–4	(Mexico) Cruz Azul	0–1	0–3

=== Semifinals ===
The first legs of the semifinals were played the week of March 30, 2010, while the second legs were played the week of April 6, 2010.

Team 1	Agg.	Team 2	1st leg	2nd leg
UNAM (Mexico)	1–5	(Mexico) Cruz Azul	1–0	0–5
Toluca (Mexico)	1–2	(Mexico) Pachuca	1–1	0–1

=== Final ===
The first leg of the final was played on April 21, 2010, while the second leg was played on April 28, 2010.

Team 1	Agg.	Team 2	1st leg	2nd leg
Cruz Azul (Mexico)	2–2 (a)	(Mexico) Pachuca	2–1	0–1

CONCACAF Champions League
2009–10 champion

Pachuca
Fourth title

== Top goalscorers ==
Rank	Name	Club	Goals
1	(Mexico) Ulises Mendivil	(Mexico) Pachuca	9
2	(Panama) Orlando Rodríguez	(Panama) Árabe Unido	8
3	(Mexico) Javier Orozco	(Mexico) Cruz Azul	5
3	(Dominican Republic) Jonathan Faña	(Trinidad and Tobago) W Connection	5
3	(Honduras) Carlos Pavón	(Honduras) Real España	5
3	(Costa Rica) Rolando Fonseca	(Guatemala) Comunicaciones	5
3	(Paraguay) Pablo Zeballos	(Mexico) Cruz Azul	5
3	(Paraguay) Edgar Benítez	(Mexico) Pachuca	5
9	(Mexico) Paul Aguilar	(Mexico) Pachuca	4
9	(Brazil) Douglas Caetano	(Honduras) Real España	4
9	(Argentina) Christian Gómez	(United States) D.C. United	4
9	(Mexico) Francisco Palencia	(Mexico) UNAM	4
