= 2009–10 CONCACAF Champions League championship round =

The 2009–10 CONCACAF Champions League championship round was the eight-team, two-legged knockout round of the 2009–10 CONCACAF Champions League. The round was played in March and April 2010.

== Qualified teams ==
A total of eight teams participated in the championship round. The following teams qualified from the group stage:

| Group | Group winners | Group runners-up |
|---|---|---|
| A | (Mexico) Pachuca | (Panama) Árabe Unido |
| B | (Mexico) Toluca | (Honduras) Marathón |
| C | (Mexico) Cruz Azul | (United States) Columbus Crew |
| D | (Mexico) UNAM | (Guatemala) Comunicaciones |

== Bracket ==
The championship round draw was conducted on November 17.

Quarterfinals
(Honduras) Marathón | 2 | 1 | 3
(Mexico) UNAM | 0 | 6 | 6
(Panama) Árabe Unido | 0 | 0 | 0
(Mexico) Cruz Azul | 1 | 3 | 4
(United States) Columbus Crew | 2 | 2 | 4
(Mexico) Toluca | 2 | 3 | 5
(Guatemala) Comunicaciones | 1 | 1 | 2
(Mexico) Pachuca | 1 | 2 | 3

Semifinals
(Mexico) UNAM | 1 | 0 | 1
(Mexico) Cruz Azul | 0 | 5 | 5
(Mexico) Toluca | 1 | 0 | 1
(Mexico) Pachuca | 1 | 1 | 2

Finals
(Mexico) Cruz Azul | 2 | 0 | 2
(Mexico) Pachuca (a) | 1 | 1 | 2

== Quarterfinals ==
The first legs of the Quarterfinals were played the week of March 9, 2010, while the second legs were played the week of March 16, 2010.

| Team 1 | Agg. | Team 2 | 1st leg | 2nd leg |
|---|---|---|---|---|
| Comunicaciones (Guatemala) | 2–3 | (Mexico) Pachuca | 1–1 | 1–2 |
| Columbus Crew (United States) | 4–5 | (Mexico) Toluca | 2–2 | 2–3 |
| Marathón (Honduras) | 3–6 | (Mexico) UNAM | 2–0 | 1–6 |
| Árabe Unido (Panama) | 0–4 | (Mexico) Cruz Azul | 0–1 | 0–3 |

=== First legs ===
March 9, 2010
20:00

| Columbus Crew (United States) | 2–2 | (Mexico) Toluca |
|---|---|---|
| Lenhart 65', 83' | Report | Sinha 19'; Ríos 44' |

Columbus Crew Stadium, Columbus
Attendance: 4,402
Referee: Courtney Campbell (Jamaica)

March 10, 2010
20:00

| Marathón (Honduras) | 2–0 | (Mexico) UNAM |
|---|---|---|
| Martínez 18' (pen.); Mejía 53' (pen.) | Report |

Estadio Olímpico Metropolitano, San Pedro Sula
Attendance: 12,297
Referee: Wálter Quesada (Costa Rica)

March 10, 2010
22:00

| Comunicaciones (Guatemala) | 1–1 | (Mexico) Pachuca |
|---|---|---|
| Fonseca 73' | Report | Aguilar 1' |

Estadio Cementos Progreso, Guatemala City
Attendance: 7,438
Referee: Roberto Moreno (Panama)

March 11, 2010
20:00

| Árabe Unido (Panama) | 0–1 | (Mexico) Cruz Azul |
|---|---|---|
| | Report | Riveros 70' |

Estadio Armando Dely Valdés, Colón
Attendance: 2,500
Referee: Walter López (Guatemala)

=== Second legs ===
March 16, 2010
22:00

| Pachuca (Mexico) | 2–1 | (Guatemala) Comunicaciones |
|---|---|---|
| Aguilar 72'; Montes 88' | Report | Fonseca 75' (pen.) |

Estadio Hidalgo, Pachuca
Attendance: 13,000
Referee: Terry Vaughn (United States)

Pachuca won 3–2 on aggregate.

March 17, 2010
20:00

| Toluca (Mexico) | 3–2 | (United States) Columbus Crew |
|---|---|---|
| Mancilla 47' (pen.); Sinha 57', 72' | Report | Schelotto 45' (pen.), 70' |

Estadio Nemesio Díez, Toluca
Attendance: 6,946
Referee: Paul Ward (Canada)

Toluca won 5–4 on aggregate.

March 17, 2010
22:00

| Cruz Azul (Mexico) | 3–0 | (Panama) Árabe Unido |
|---|---|---|
| Orozco 50', 75'; Villaluz 64' | Report |

Estadio Azul, Mexico City
Attendance: 3,140
Referee: José Pineda (Honduras)

Cruz Azul won 4–0 on aggregate.

March 18, 2010
22:00

| UNAM (Mexico) | 6–1 | (Honduras) Marathón |
|---|---|---|
| Barrera 3'; Íñiguez 20', 35'; Bravo 50'; Palencia 63', 90' | Report | Chiapas 53' (o.g.) |

Estadio Olímpico Universitario, Mexico City
Attendance: 8,500
Referee: Neal Brizan (Trinidad and Tobago)

UNAM won 6–3 on aggregate.

== Semifinals ==
The first legs of the Semifinals were played the week of March 30, 2010, while the second legs were played the week of April 6, 2010.

| Team 1 | Agg. | Team 2 | 1st leg | 2nd leg |
|---|---|---|---|---|
| UNAM (Mexico) | 1–5 | (Mexico) Cruz Azul | 1–0 | 0–5 |
| Toluca (Mexico) | 1–2 | (Mexico) Pachuca | 1–1 | 0–1 |

=== First legs ===
March 30, 2010
22:00

| Toluca (Mexico) | 1–1 | (Mexico) Pachuca |
|---|---|---|
| Dueñas 78' | Report | Cvitanich 34' |

Estadio Nemesio Díez, Toluca
Attendance: 13,898
Referee: Ricardo Arellano (Mexico)

March 31, 2010
22:00

| UNAM (Mexico) | 1–0 | (Mexico) Cruz Azul |
|---|---|---|
| Barrera 24' | Report |

Estadio Olímpico Universitario, Mexico City
Attendance: 32,177
Referee: José Alfredo Peñaloza Soto (Mexico)

=== Second legs ===
April 6, 2010
22:00

| Cruz Azul (Mexico) | 5–0 | (Mexico) UNAM |
|---|---|---|
| Riveros 37'; Cervantes 74'; Cortés 77'; Chávez 84'; Lugo 90' | Report |

Estadio Azul, Mexico City
Attendance: 28,900
Referee: Mauricio Morales (Mexico)

Cruz Azul won 5–1 on aggregate.

April 7, 2010
20:00

| Pachuca (Mexico) | 1–0 | (Mexico) Toluca |
|---|---|---|
| Brambila 6' | Report |

Estadio Hidalgo, Pachuca
Attendance: 25,000
Referee: Roberto García (Mexico)

Pachuca won 2–1 on aggregate.

== Final ==
The first leg of the Final was played on April 21, 2010, while the second leg was played on April 28, 2010.

| Team 1 | Agg. | Team 2 | 1st leg | 2nd leg |
|---|---|---|---|---|
| Cruz Azul (Mexico) | 2–2 (a) | (Mexico) Pachuca | 2–1 | 0–1 |

=== First leg ===
April 21, 2010
22:00

| Cruz Azul (Mexico) | 2–1 | (Mexico) Pachuca |
|---|---|---|
| Villa 20'; Rodríguez 24' (o.g.) | Report | Álvarez 69' |

Estadio Azul, Mexico City
Attendance: 16,186
Referee: Benito Archundia (Mexico)

=== Second leg ===
April 28, 2010
20:00

| Pachuca (Mexico) | 1–0 | (Mexico) Cruz Azul |
|---|---|---|
| Benítez 90+3' | Report |

Estadio Hidalgo, Pachuca
Attendance: 26,500
Referee: Marco Antonio Rodríguez (Mexico)

2–2 on aggregate. Pachuca won on away goals.
