= 2009–10 CONCACAF Champions League group stage =

The group stage was played in 6 rounds from August to October 2009.

== Tie-breaking criteria ==
The tie breaking procedures follow the same rules as the 2008–09 Champions League. If two teams are tied on points, the following tie-breaking criteria shall be applied, in order, to determine the ranking of teams:

1. Greater number of points earned in matches between the teams concerned
2. Greater goal difference in matches between the teams concerned
3. Greater number of goals scored away from home in matches between the teams concerned
4. Reapply first three criteria if two or more teams are still tied
5. Greater goal difference in all group matches
6. Greater number of goals scored in group matches
7. Greater number of goals scored away in all group matches
8. Drawing of lots

== Groups ==
All times EDT (UTC-4)

=== Group A ===
| Team | Pld | W | D | L | GF | GA | GD | Pts |
|---|---|---|---|---|---|---|---|---|
| (Mexico) Pachuca | 6 | 5 | 0 | 1 | 15 | 4 | +11 | 15 |
| (Panama) Árabe Unido | 6 | 3 | 1 | 2 | 13 | 9 | +4 | 10 |
| (United States) Houston Dynamo | 6 | 2 | 1 | 3 | 9 | 8 | +1 | 7 |
| (El Salvador) Isidro Metapán | 6 | 1 | 0 | 5 | 3 | 19 | −16 | 3 |

August 19, 2009
20:00

| Houston Dynamo (United States) | 1–0 | (El Salvador) Isidro Metapán |
|---|---|---|
| Ching 68' | Report |

Robertson Stadium, Houston
Attendance: 7,997
Referee: Mauricio Morales (Mexico)
August 19, 2009
20:00

| Árabe Unido (Panama) | 4–1 | (Mexico) Pachuca |
|---|---|---|
| Rodríguez 24'; Mendieta 45'; Mosquera 72'; Lewis 88' | Report | Aguilar 78' |

Estadio Agustín Sánchez, La Chorrera
Attendance: 1,000
Referee: Terry Vaughn (United States)

August 25, 2009
20:00

| Pachuca (Mexico) | 5–0 | (El Salvador) Isidro Metapán |
|---|---|---|
| Álvarez 14'; Mendivil 21', 55'; J. Torres 85'; Montes 90' | Report |

Estadio Hidalgo, Pachuca
Attendance: 14,000
Referee: Raymond Bogle (Jamaica)
August 26, 2009
20:00

| Árabe Unido (Panama) | 1–1 | (United States) Houston Dynamo |
|---|---|---|
| Rodríguez 86' | Report | Kamara 69' |

Estadio Agustín Sánchez, La Chorrera
Attendance: 1,300
Referee: Neal Brizan (Trinidad and Tobago)

September 15, 2009
22:00

| Isidro Metapán (El Salvador) | 0–1 | (Panama) Árabe Unido |
|---|---|---|
| | Report | Rodríguez 90' |

Estadio Jorge Calero Suárez, Metapán
Attendance: 3,500
Referee: Baldomero Toledo (United States)
September 16, 2009
22:00

| Pachuca (Mexico) | 2–0 | (United States) Houston Dynamo |
|---|---|---|
| Benítez 25'; Aguilar 74' | Report |

Estadio Hidalgo, Pachuca
Attendance: 18,000
Referee: Elmer Bonilla (El Salvador)

September 22, 2009
22:00

| Houston Dynamo (United States) | 5–1 | (Panama) Árabe Unido |
|---|---|---|
| Robinson 11'; Weaver 50'; Ashe 70'; Holden 74', 90' | (Report) | Rodríguez 69' |

Robertson Stadium, Houston
Attendance: 6,938
Referee: Paul Delgadillo (Mexico)
September 22, 2009
22:00

| Isidro Metapán (El Salvador) | 0–4 | (Mexico) Pachuca |
|---|---|---|
| | (Report) | Mendivil 10', 82'; Brambila 35'; Benítez 60' |

Estadio Jorge Calero Suárez, Metapán
Attendance: 2,268
Referee: Óscar Moncada (Honduras)

September 29, 2009
22:00

| Árabe Unido (Panama) | 6–0 | (El Salvador) Isidro Metapán |
|---|---|---|
| Aguirre 29', 71'; O. Rodríguez 52', 73', 88'; McTaggar 80' | (Report) |

Estadio Armando Dely Valdés, Colón
Attendance: 2,250
Referee: Jair Marrufo (United States)
September 30, 2009
22:00

| Houston Dynamo (United States) | 0–1 | (Mexico) Pachuca |
|---|---|---|
| | (Report) | Benítez 23' |

Robertson Stadium, Houston
Attendance: 10,130
Referee: Roberto Moreno (Panama)

October 21, 2009
20:00

| Pachuca (Mexico) | 2–0 | (Panama) Árabe Unido |
|---|---|---|
| Mendivil 44', 55' |

Estadio Hidalgo, Pachuca
Attendance: 8,000
Referee: Joel Aguilar (El Salvador)
October 21, 2009
22:00

| Isidro Metapán (El Salvador) | 3–2 | (United States) Houston Dynamo |
|---|---|---|
| Montes 7'; Canales 8'; Umaña 56' | (Report) | Cameron 28'; Hall 45' |

Estadio Jorge Calero Suárez, Metapán
Attendance: 1,200
Referee: José Pineda (Honduras)

=== Group B ===
| Team | Pld | W | D | L | GF | GA | GD | Pts |
|---|---|---|---|---|---|---|---|---|
| (Mexico) Toluca | 6 | 4 | 1 | 1 | 15 | 4 | +11 | 13 |
| (Honduras) Marathón | 6 | 4 | 0 | 2 | 12 | 14 | −2 | 12 |
| (United States) D.C. United | 6 | 3 | 1 | 2 | 12 | 8 | +4 | 10 |
| (Trinidad and Tobago) San Juan Jabloteh | 6 | 0 | 0 | 6 | 4 | 17 | −13 | 0 |

August 18, 2009
22:00

| Marathón (Honduras) | 3–1 | (United States) D.C. United |
|---|---|---|
| Martínez 23'; Palacios 83'; Berrios 88' (pen.) | Report | Emilio 48' |

Estadio Olímpico Metropolitano, San Pedro Sula
Attendance: 3,658
Referee: Edward Bonilla (El Salvador)
August 20, 2009
20:00

| San Juan Jabloteh (Trinidad and Tobago) | 0–1 | (Mexico) Toluca |
|---|---|---|
| | Report | Nava 8' |

Hasely Crawford Stadium, Port of Spain
Attendance: 700
Referee: Wálter Quesada (Costa Rica)

August 26, 2009
20:00

| D.C. United (United States) | 1–3 | (Mexico) Toluca |
|---|---|---|
| Pontius 47' | Report | Marín 5'; Mancilla 79', 86' |

RFK Stadium, Washington, D.C.
Attendance: 8,834
Referee: Courtney Campbell (Jamaica)
August 26, 2009
22:00

| Marathón (Honduras) | 3–1 | (Trinidad and Tobago) San Juan Jabloteh |
|---|---|---|
| Berríos 10'; Sabillón 86'; Martínez 90+2' | Report | Williams 45' (pen.) |

Estadio Olímpico Metropolitano, San Pedro Sula
Attendance: 4,000
Referee: Paúl Delgadillo (Mexico)

September 15, 2009
20:00

| San Juan Jabloteh (Trinidad and Tobago) | 0–1 | (United States) D.C. United |
|---|---|---|
| | Report | Gómez 14' (pen.) |

Hasely Crawford Stadium, Port of Spain
Attendance: 2,000
Referee: Trevor Taylor (Barbados)
September 17, 2009
20:00

| Toluca (Mexico) | 7–0 | (Honduras) Marathón |
|---|---|---|
| Brizuela 13'; De la Torre 14', 67'; Nava 48', 90+1'; Marín 82'; Esquivel 88' | (Report) |

Estadio Nemesio Díez, Toluca
Attendance: 10,000
Referee: Carlos Batres (Guatemala)

September 23, 2009
22:00

| Toluca (Mexico) | 3–0 | (Trinidad and Tobago) San Juan Jabloteh |
|---|---|---|
| Brizuela 28'; Zarate 65'; Calderón 77' | (Report) |

Estadio Nemesio Díez, Toluca
Attendance: 15,000
Referee: Luis Rodríguez (Panama)
September 24, 2009
20:00

| D.C. United (United States) | 3–0 | (Honduras) Marathón |
|---|---|---|
| Emilio 47', 71'; Moreno 55' | (Report) |

RFK Stadium, Washington, D.C.
Attendance: 5,280
Referee: Silviu Petrescu (Canada)

September 30, 2009
20:00

| D.C. United (United States) | 5–1 | (Trinidad and Tobago) San Juan Jabloteh |
|---|---|---|
| Gómez 13', 68'; Fred 30'; Khumalo 43', 90' | (Report) | Britto 83' |

RFK Stadium, Washington, D.C.
Attendance: 3,411
Referee: German Arredondo (Mexico)
October 1, 2009
22:00

| Marathón (Honduras) | 2–0 | (Mexico) Toluca |
|---|---|---|
| Martínez 9' (pen.); Mejía 35' |

Estadio Olímpico Metropolitano, San Pedro Sula
Attendance: 1,483
Referee: Walter López (Guatemala)

October 20, 2009
20:00

| Toluca (Mexico) | 1–1 | (United States) D.C. United |
|---|---|---|
| López 62' (pen.) | | Pontius 6' |

Estadio Nemesio Díez, Toluca
Attendance: 9,909
Referee: Geoffrey Hospedales (Trinidad and Tobago)
October 22, 2009
22:00

| San Juan Jabloteh (Trinidad and Tobago) | 2–4 | (Honduras) Marathón |
|---|---|---|
| Glen 42'; Mulraine 74' | | Martínez 25'; Palacios 47', 69', 81' |

Hasely Crawford Stadium, Port of Spain
Attendance: 500
Referee: Marco Rodríguez (Mexico)

=== Group C ===
| Team | Pld | W | D | L | GF | GA | GD | Pts |
|---|---|---|---|---|---|---|---|---|
| (Mexico) Cruz Azul | 6 | 5 | 1 | 0 | 16 | 4 | +12 | 16 |
| (United States) Columbus Crew | 6 | 2 | 2 | 2 | 5 | 9 | −4 | 8 |
| (Costa Rica) Saprissa | 6 | 1 | 2 | 3 | 6 | 8 | −2 | 5 |
| Puerto Rico Islanders | 6 | 0 | 3 | 3 | 6 | 12 | −6 | 3 |

August 18, 2009
20:00

| Columbus Crew (United States) | 2–0 | Puerto Rico Islanders |
|---|---|---|
| Lenhart 58'; Rogers 79' | Report |

Columbus Crew Stadium, Columbus
Attendance: 6,161
Referee: Roberto Moreno (Panama)
August 19, 2009
22:00

| Cruz Azul (Mexico) | 2–0 | (Costa Rica) Saprissa |
|---|---|---|
| Riveros 14'; Huiqui 36' | Report |

Estadio Azul, Mexico City
Attendance: 9,217
Referee: Courtney Campbell (Jamaica)

August 25, 2009
22:00

| Saprissa (Costa Rica) | 3–1 | Puerto Rico Islanders |
|---|---|---|
| Arrieta 34'; Centeno 40'; Alonso 49' | (Report) | Mediate 25' |

Estadio Ricardo Saprissa Aymá, San Juan de Tibás
Attendance: 4,000
Referee: Luis Rodríguez (Panama)
August 26, 2009
22:00

| Cruz Azul (Mexico) | 5–0 | (United States) Columbus Crew |
|---|---|---|
| Lozano 4', 82' (pen.), 87'; Núñez 9'; Marshall 47' (o.g.) | Report |

Estadio Azul, Mexico City
Attendance: 2,669
Referee: Óscar Moncada (Honduras)

September 15, 2009
20:00

| Puerto Rico Islanders | 3–3 | (Mexico) Cruz Azul |
|---|---|---|
| Arrieta 28'; Noel 40'; Addlery 45+' | Report | Zeballos 34', 68'; Vela 85' |

Estadio Juan Ramón Loubriel, Bayamón
Attendance: 3,000
Referee: Stanley Lancaster (Guyana)
September 16, 2009
22:00

| Saprissa (Costa Rica) | 0–1 | (United States) Columbus Crew |
|---|---|---|
| | (Report) | Gaven 5' |

Estadio Ricardo Saprissa Aymá, San Juan de Tibás
Attendance: 5,600
Referee: Roberto García (Mexico)

September 22, 2009
20:00

| Puerto Rico Islanders | 1–1 | (Costa Rica) Saprissa |
|---|---|---|
| Hansen 72' | (Report) | Waston 90+3' |

Estadio Juan Ramón Loubriel, Bayamón
Attendance: 3,100
Referee: Raymond Bogle (Jamaica)
September 23, 2009
20:00

| Columbus Crew (United States) | 0–2 | (Mexico) Cruz Azul |
|---|---|---|
| | (Report) | Zeballos 14'; Vela 39' |

Columbus Crew Stadium, Columbus
Attendance: 7,921
Referee: Geoffrey Hospedales (Trinidad and Tobago)

September 29, 2009
20:00

| Columbus Crew (United States) | 1–1 | (Costa Rica) Saprissa |
|---|---|---|
| Rogers 26' (pen.) | (Report) | Robinson 90+2' |

Columbus Crew Stadium, Columbus
Attendance: 5,715
Referee: Mauricio Morales (Mexico)
September 29, 2009
20:00

| Cruz Azul (Mexico) | 2–0 | Puerto Rico Islanders |
|---|---|---|
| Ortiz 6'; Villa 52' | (Report) |

Estadio Azul, Mexico City
Attendance: 2,521
Referee: Paul Ward (Canada)

October 20, 2009
20:00

| Puerto Rico Islanders | 1–1 | (United States) Columbus Crew |
|---|---|---|
| Delgado 34' | (Report) | Rentería 74' |

Estadio Juan Ramón Loubriel, Bayamón
Attendance: 300
Referee: Elmer Bonilla (El Salvador)
October 20, 2009
20:00

| Saprissa (Costa Rica) | 1–2 | (Mexico) Cruz Azul |
|---|---|---|
| Waston 41' | | Núñez 56'; Zeballos 82' |

Estadio Ricardo Saprissa Aymá, San Juan de Tibás
Attendance: 6,000
Referee: Ricardo Zelaya (Honduras)

=== Group D ===
| Team | Pld | W | D | L | GF | GA | GD | Pts |
|---|---|---|---|---|---|---|---|---|
| (Mexico) UNAM | 6 | 4 | 1 | 1 | 15 | 6 | +9 | 13 |
| (Guatemala) Comunicaciones | 6 | 3 | 0 | 3 | 6 | 8 | −2 | 9 |
| (Trinidad and Tobago) W Connection | 6 | 2 | 1 | 3 | 10 | 9 | +1 | 7 |
| (Honduras) Real España | 6 | 2 | 0 | 4 | 6 | 14 | −8 | 6 |

August 18, 2009
22:00

| UNAM (Mexico) | 1–0 | (Guatemala) Comunicaciones |
|---|---|---|
| Fuentes 71' | Report |

Estadio Olímpico Universitario, Mexico City
Attendance: 7,000
Referee: José Pineda (Honduras)
August 20, 2009
22:00

| Real España (Honduras) | 1–0 | (Trinidad and Tobago) W Connection |
|---|---|---|
| Martínez 12' | Report |

Estadio Olímpico Metropolitano, San Pedro Sula
Attendance: 5,000
Referee: Walter López (Guatemala)

August 27, 2009
20:00

| W Connection (Trinidad and Tobago) | 1–2 | (Guatemala) Comunicaciones |
|---|---|---|
| Leon 75' | Report | Montepeque 31'; Fonseca 80' (pen.) |

Manny Ramjohn Stadium, Marabella
Attendance: 2,300
Referee: Ricardo Salazar (United States)
August 27, 2009
22:00

| Real España (Honduras) | 1–5 | (Mexico) UNAM |
|---|---|---|
| Mattoso 52' | Report | Barrera 12'; Chiapas 45'; López 64', 68', 83' |

Estadio Olímpico Metropolitano, San Pedro Sula
Attendance: 6,288
Referee: Ricardo Cerdas (Costa Rica)

September 16, 2009
20:00

| W Connection (Trinidad and Tobago) | 2–2 | (Mexico) UNAM |
|---|---|---|
| Faña 21'; Pereira 89' | Report | Rosales 87'; Palencia 90+2' |

Manny Ramjohn Stadium, Marabella
Attendance: 1,600
Referee: Mark Geiger (United States)
September 17, 2009
22:00

| Comunicaciones (Guatemala) | 2–0 | (Honduras) Real España |
|---|---|---|
| Fonseca 36', 89' | Report |

Estadio Mateo Flores, Guatemala City
Attendance: 8,078
Referee: Benito Archundia (Mexico)

September 23, 2009
22:00

| Comunicaciones (Guatemala) | 0–3 | (Trinidad and Tobago) W Connection |
|---|---|---|
| | Report | Faña 47', 55', 77' |

Estadio Mateo Flores, Guatemala City
Attendance: 6,662
Referee: Wálter Quesada (Costa Rica)
September 24, 2009
22:00

| UNAM (Mexico) | 4–0 | (Honduras) Real España |
|---|---|---|
| Íñiguez 21'; Rosales 40'; Martínez 61' (o.g.); Cortés 82' | Report |

Estadio Olímpico Universitario, Mexico City
Attendance: 5,321
Referee: Elmar Rodas (Guatemala)

September 30, 2009
20:00

| UNAM (Mexico) | 2–1 | (Trinidad and Tobago) W Connection |
|---|---|---|
| Palencia 68'; Rojas 85' | Report | Viveros 62' |

Estadio Olímpico Universitario, Mexico City
Attendance: 3,614
Referee: Raymond Bogle (Jamaica)
September 30, 2009
22:00

| Real España (Honduras) | 2–0 | (Guatemala) Comunicaciones |
|---|---|---|
| Thompson 9' (o.g.); Pavón 15' | Report |

Estadio Olímpico Metropolitano, San Pedro Sula
Attendance: 800
Referee: Roberto García (Mexico)

October 21, 2009
20:00

| W Connection (Trinidad and Tobago) | 3–2 | (Honduras) Real España |
|---|---|---|
| Diaz 6', 8'; Zé Luiz 65' | Report | Matosso 45'; Pavón 57' |

Manny Ramjohn Stadium, Marabella
Attendance: 1,000
Referee: Trevor Taylor (Barbados)
October 22, 2009
22:00

| Comunicaciones (Guatemala) | 2–1 | (Mexico) UNAM |
|---|---|---|
| González 5' (o.g.); Montepeque 23' | | González 36' |

Estadio Mateo Flores, Guatemala City
Attendance: 6,070
Referee: Luís Rodríguez (Panama)
