= Ernst Öbster =

Austrian footballer

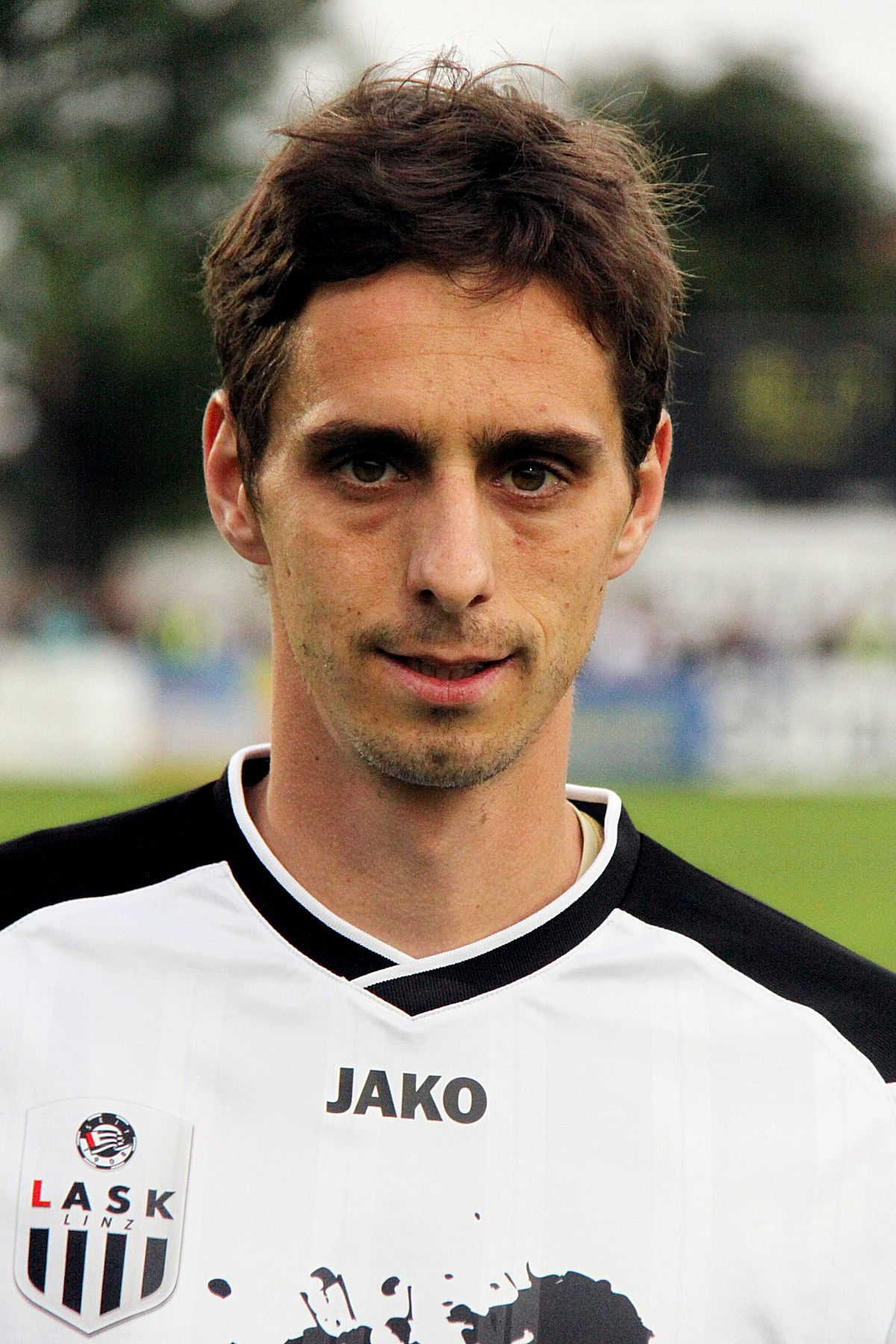

Personal information
- Full name: Ernst Öbster
- Date of birth: 17 March 1984 (age 42)
- Place of birth: Salzburg, Austria
- Height: 5 ft 10 in (1.78 m)
- Position: Midfielder

Team information
- Current team: SV Friedburg

Youth career
- SK Bischofshofen
- BNZ Salzburg

Senior career*
Years	Team	Apps	(Gls)
2001–2009	Red Bull Salzburg	40	(0)
2003–2004	→ LASK Linz (loan)	28	(2)
2007–2009	→ Red Bull Salzburg Juniors (loan)	30	(9)
2009	New York Red Bulls	3	(0)
2010–2011	Wacker Innsbruck	25	(3)
2011–2013	SV Grödig	56	(6)
2013–2015	LASK Linz	30	(5)
2015–2018	SV Austria Salzburg	96	(20)
2018–2019	SK Altheim		
2019–	SV Friedburg	12	(2)

International career
2004–2006	Austria U-21	11	(0)
- * Club domestic league appearances and goals as of 26 October 2019

Ernst Öbster (born 17 March 1984) is an Austrian footballer who plays for SV Friedburg.

== Career ==
=== Club ===
Öbster began his youth career with SK Bischofshofen and in 2001 joined BNZ Salzburg. After impressing with BNZ, Öbster was called up by the SV Austria Salzburg first team and debuted in the Austrian Bundesliga as a 17-year-old. After receiving limited playing time with Salzburg, Öbster was loaned to LASK Linz in 2003, during his time with Linz he was a regular starter as a left-sided midfielder appearing in 28 matches and notching 2 goals. After an impressive season with Linz, Öbster returned to SV Austria Salzburg and was a key reserve for the club. In 2005, SV Austria Salzburg was acquired by Red Bull and Öbster remained with the first team appearing in 7 league matches. Over the next few years he would alternate between the first team and Red Bull Juniors playing in the Austrian Football First League, in which he appeared in 30 matches scoring 9 goals. In the 2008–09 season Öbster appeared in 5 league matches and 4 UEFA Cup qualification matches in which he scored 2 goals. He also appeared in 3 Austrian Cup matches scoring 1 goal.

Following the season it was believed that Rapid Vienna was interested in signing Öbster, however he elected to join sister club New York Red Bulls, agreeing to terms on 14 July 2009. He scored for New York on his debut 30 July 2009 in the first leg of the CONCACAF Champions League series with W Connection, which ended in a 2–2 draw

Öbster was released by New York Red Bulls on 24 March 2010. Following his release from New York, Öbster returned to Austria and signed with Wacker Innsbruck.

=== International ===
Internationally he has played eleven times for the Austrian U-21 national team. In 2003, he took part in the U-19 European Championship and helped Austria reach the semifinals.

== Titles ==
Season	Team	Title
2007	FC Red Bull Salzburg	Austrian Bundesliga
2009	FC Red Bull Salzburg	Austrian Bundesliga
2013	SV Grödig	Austrian First Football League
2014	LASK Linz	Austrian Regional Central league

== MLS Statistics ==
All-time MLS club performance
Club	Season	Major League Soccer		US Open Cup		MLS Cup		CONCACAF		Total
Club	Season	App	Goals	App	Goals	App	Goals	App	Goals	App	Goals
New York Red Bulls	2009	3	0	-	-	-	-	2	1	5	1
New York Red Bulls	Club Total	3	0	-	-	-	-	2	1	5	1
