= Diego País =

Argentine footballer (born 1976)

Personal information
- Full name: Diego Joaquín País
- Date of birth: 6 July 1976 (age 50)
- Place of birth: Bahía Blanca, Argentina
- Height: 1.80 m (5 ft 11 in)
- Position: Striker

Youth career
- Olimpo

Senior career*
| Years | Team | Apps | (Gls) |
| 1996–2001 | Olimpo | | |
| 2001–2003 | Luparense | | |
| 2003–2005 | Verona | | |
| 2005–2006 | Mantova | | |
| 2006–2007 | Bella Vista | 31 | (21) |
| 2007–2010 | Pérez Zeledón | 62 | (31) |
| 2010–2011 | Cartaginés | 31 | (13) |
| 2011–2012 | AD San Carlos | 23 | (6) |
| 2012–2013 | Herediano | 8 | (2) |
| 2013 | Carmelita | 10 | (0) |
- * Club domestic league appearances and goals

Diego Joaquín País (born 6 July 1976) is an Argentine football player.

== Career ==
País began playing as a striker in his home country, but has spent most of his career in the lower divisions of Italian football and in the Costa Rican Primera División. In Costa Rica, he has played for Pérez Zeledón, Cartaginés, San Carlos and Herediano. He has scored a hat-trick with Pérez Zeledón and Cartaginés.

País signed with Carmelita in January 2013.
