= Manuel Salazar (artist) =

American artist convicted of involuntary manslaughter

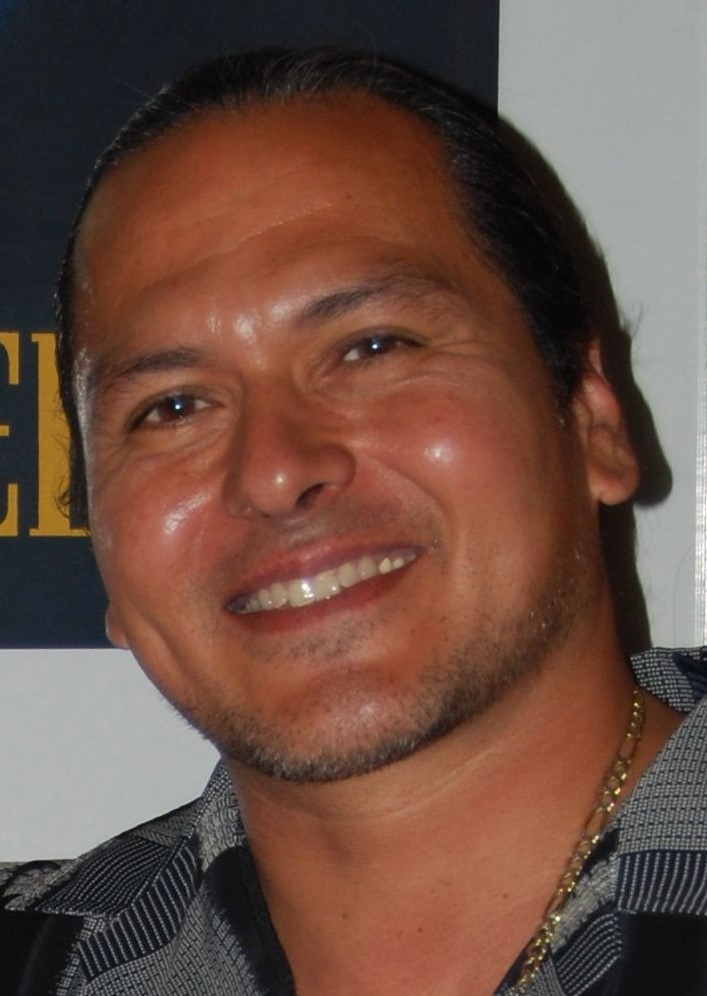
- Born: February 20, 1966 (age 60)
- Conviction: Involuntary manslaughter

Manuel Salazar (born February 20, 1966) was convicted of involuntary manslaughter for the shooting of a police officer in 1984. Initially convicted of murder and sentenced to death, he became known as an artist for paintings he created while on death row. Salazar's murder conviction was overturned in 1994; on retrial, Salazar was convicted of involuntary manslaughter, and released from prison in 1996.

== Shooting of Martin Murrin ==
On September 12, 1984, Salazar was in a car traveling on the east side of Joliet when their car was stopped by local police. Salazar, who was wanted on a felony warrant, ran from the car with a bag containing an unlicensed handgun. Police Officer Martin Murrin, his gun drawn, chased Salazar down an alley. After a struggle, Murrin was shot five times with his own weapon, killing him. Salazar claimed that he had surrendered to Murrin, but Murrin continued beating him, and Salazar shot Murrin in self-defense.

== Extradition from Mexico and conviction ==
Salazar fled to Mexico after the shooting, but was captured and returned to Illinois to stand trial in a process alleged to have violated the United States' extradition treaty with Mexico. In December 1985, Salazar was convicted of murder and sentenced to death by lethal injection. His conviction was upheld by the Illinois State Supreme Court in 1988.

== International attention ==
In 1994, Salazar's situation started to attract international attention after a series of his paintings, released from the penitentiary in that year, toured in the United Kingdom. International pressure and significant press coverage continued throughout 1994-95 and culminated on June 10, 1996, in an Early Day Motion, signed by 47 MPs in the House of Parliament in the UK drawing attention to Salazar's legal predicament and demanding his release. Pressure for Salazar's release came from the UK Campaign, Amnesty International, and Pope John Paul II.

== Overturned conviction and retrial ==
In 1994, Salazar's conviction was overturned by the Illinois State Supreme Court, on the grounds that the jury instructions had made it impossible for them to instead choose to convict on the lesser charge of second degree murder. Salazar was retried in 1996 and convicted of the lesser charge of involuntary manslaughter. Having already served more than the ten-year maximum sentence for involuntary manslaughter, Salazar was released.
