= Marco Antonio Rodríguez =

Mexican football referee (born 1973)

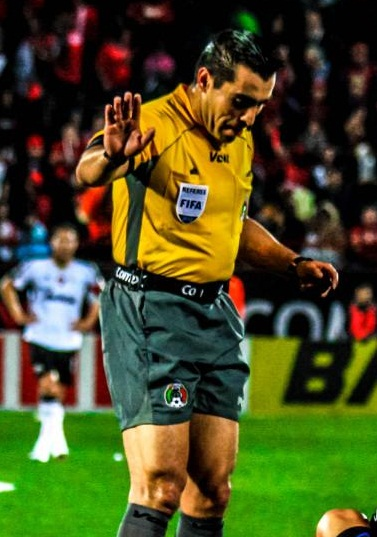
- Rodríguez officiating a match between Tijuana and Atlas in 2012
- Full name: Marco Antonio Rodríguez Moreno
- Born: 10 November 1973 (age 52); Mexico City, Mexico

Domestic
Years	League	Role
1997–2014	Primera División	Referee

International
Years	League	Role
2000–2014	FIFA listed	Referee

Marco Antonio Rodríguez Moreno (born 10 November 1973) is a Mexican former football referee and current analyst.

== Career ==
After completing a training as a football referee in Tepic and studying Physical Education, Rodríguez began a career as a professional match official in 1995. He would soon become one of the top referees in the Mexican First Division, where he earned a reputation for commanding respect on the pitch, although he was also known for his temperament and for being quick to show yellow and red cards.

After an incident during the Apertura 2011 final between Tigres and Santos Laguna, he was suspended for 5 games by the Mexican Federation when he showed two yellow cards at the same time to Héctor Mancilla and Carlos Adrián Morales. During the 2014 Copa Libertadores game between Atlético Nacional and Nacional, he gave the quickest red card in the history of the competition when he sent off Alejandro Bernal from Atlético Nacional after 27 seconds into the game for a harsh tackle. Rodríguez

An international referee since 2000, in December 2007, Rodríguez officiated the FIFA Club World Cup final between Boca Juniors and Milan. He also officiated the first leg of the 2009 CONCACAF Champions League final, and the second leg of the 2010 CONCACAF Champions League final. Rodríguez was selected as a referee for three FIFA World Cups. In the 2006 tournament in Germany, he refereed the England vs Paraguay match and the Côte d'Ivoire vs Serbia and Montenegro match, where he sent off Cyril Domoraud and Albert Nađ. In the 2010 tournament in South Africa, Rodríguez was match referee for the first group match between Australia and Germany, where he gave a straight red card to Australian striker Tim Cahill. He also sent off Chile's Marco Estrada during the group stage encounter between Chile and Spain.

His final international tournament was the 2014 FIFA World Cup in Brazil, in which he took charge of 3 games. During the first round, he refereed the final group D match between Uruguay and Italy, where he controversially sent off Italian midfielder Claudio Marchisio after an alleged studs-up challenge on Egidio Arévalo. Later in the match, Rodríguez failed to see Uruguayan striker Luis Suárez bite Italian defender Giorgio Chiellini; Uruguay went on to score with Diego Godín from the ensuing corner. After the match, which Italy lost 1–0, eliminating them from the tournament, with Uruguay advancing in their place, this assault launched a FIFA Disciplinary Committee investigation that ultimately ruled that Suárez would receive a 9-match suspension and a fine, and would be banned from any football activity for four months.

Two weeks later, Rodríguez officiated the semi-final between hosts Brazil and eventual champions Germany, which ended in a historic 1–7 loss for Brazil. After the end of the tournament, Rodríguez announced his retirement as referee.

In August 2019, Rodríguez signed as head coach of Spanish third-tier team Salamanca CF. However, few days later and just one day before starting the league, he was sacked.

In 2020, he joined TUDN as a football analyst. He was partially removed from the channel in early 2024, although as of June 2024 he continues making appearances on Foro TV.

== Personal life ==
Early in his refereeing career, Rodríguez was nicknamed "Chiquidrácula" due to his resemblance with a Mexican TV character of child Count Dracula, portrayed by Carlos Espejel. Later, Rodríguez stated that he preferred to be called "Chiquimarco", as he deemed the Dracula reference to be incompatible with his Christian faith.

A sports professor during his early days as a referee, Rodríguez also formerly served as a Protestant pastor.

== Legal issues ==
In July 2023, Rodríguez was indicted on charges of domestic violence against his wife and one of his daughters. Rodríguez was reportedly arrested on these charges on 16 November 2025 and had been ordered to remain in prison, with a court appearance scheduled for 18 November. He was accused of "physical and psycho-emotional violence", as well as intimidation, with his eldest daughter saying that he threatened her with commitment to a mental hospital if she disobeyed him.

On 18 November, Rodríguez, who had not been arrested but had rather a suspended arrest warrant served against him, did not present himself at the midday audience in the Tribunal Nº3 of Mexico City, for which the presiding judge ordered the arrest warrant against him to be reactivated. A group of feminist activists went to the court to publicly accuse Rodríguez of violence, male chauvinism, and depredatory behaviour. Francisco Chacón, another Mexican FIFA referee who often clashed with Rodríguez over refereeing issues, was asked whether he was happy about the situation Rodríguez is going through, to which Chacón commented that while he was not happy about it, Rodríguez was "reaping what [he] sowed."

On 23 December 2025, Judge Carolina Bernal ordered preemptive detention for Rodríguez, giving him 72-hours to voluntarily submit himself for arrest until 26 December. In case of not complying with the decision, Bernal announced that she will order Rodríguez's arrest. Rodriguez did not present himself for the audience and, on 31 December, a judge ordered his arrest and pre-trial detention on domestic violence charges.

== World Cup matches officiated ==
Tournament	Date	Venue	Round	Team 1	Result	Team 2
(Germany) 2006	10 June	Commerzbank-Arena, Frankfurt	First round	England	1–0	Paraguay
(Germany) 2006	21 June	Allianz Arena, Munich	First round	Ivory Coast	3–2	Serbia and Montenegro
(South Africa) 2010	13 June	Moses Mabhida Stadium, Durban	First round	Germany	4–0	Australia
(South Africa) 2010	25 June	Loftus Versfeld Stadium, Pretoria	First round	Spain	2–1	Chile
(Brazil) 2014	17 June	Estádio Mineirão, Belo Horizonte	First round	Belgium	2–1	Algeria
(Brazil) 2014	24 June	Arena das Dunas, Natal	First round	Italy	0–1	Uruguay
(Brazil) 2014	8 July	Estádio Mineirão, Belo Horizonte	Semi-finals	Brazil	1–7	Germany

== Major club matches officiated ==
Date	Match	Tournament	Venue	Result	Ref
16 December 2007	Boca Juniors vs. Milan	2007 FIFA Club World Cup final	Nissan Stadium, Yokohama, Japan	2–4	
22 April 2009	Cruz Azul vs. Atlante	2009 CONCACAF Champions League final (first leg)	Estadio Azul, Mexico City, Mexico	0–2 (0–2 on aggregate)	
28 April 2010	Pachuca vs. Cruz Azul	2010 CONCACAF Champions League final (second leg)	Estadio Hidalgo, Pachuca, Mexico	1–0 (2–2 on aggregate; Pachuca won on away goals)	

Preceded by (Guatemala) Carlos Batres	FIFA Club World Cup final match referees 2007 (Mexico) Marco Rodríguez	Succeeded by (Uzbekistan) Ravshan Irmatov
