= Manuel Salazar (footballer) =

Salvadoran footballer (born 1986)

Personal information
- Full name: Manuel Alejandro Salazar Rivas
- Date of birth: January 23, 1986 (age 40)
- Place of birth: San Salvador, El Salvador
- Height: 1.77 m (5 ft 9 1/2 in)
- Position: Defender

Senior career*
Years	Team	Apps	(Gls)
2003–2005	Telecom		
2005–2011	Luís Ángel Firpo		
2010	FAS		
2011	Luís Ángel Firpo		

International career
2007–2010	El Salvador	50	(0)
- * Club domestic league appearances and goals

Manuel Alejandro Salazar Rivas (born January 23, 1986) is a Salvadoran retired professional footballer.

He played for the El Salvador national team.

== Club career ==
Salazar started his career at Salvadoran Second Division side Telecom before joining Luís Ángel Firpo in 2005.

In December 2008, Salazar along with his club and national team teammate Carlos Monteagudo, both were invited to train with Mexican Primera División A team Monterrey 1a. A (effectively CF Monterreys reserve team), with the hopes of signing with the club's second division side. After the two-week trial, both players returned to El Salvador, with the promise from head coach Gerardo Jiménez, that he would look to open negotiations to transfer them to the club, whether on a full-time basis, or on loan however neither player was ever signed. On July 1, 2010, Salazar signed a six-month contract with FAS only to rejoin Firpo for the 2011 Clausura claiming FAS owing him three months wages.

== International career ==
Salazar received his first call up to the national team in January 2007 and made his debut for El Salvador in a February 2007 UNCAF Nations Cup match against Nicaragua. He earned a total of 50 caps, scoring no goals, and has represented his country in 18 FIFA World Cup qualification matches. He has played at the 2007 UNCAF Nations Cup, as well as at the 2007 and 2009 CONCACAF Gold Cups.

His final international game was an October 2010 friendly match against Costa Rica.

== Retirement from football ==
On May 18, 2011, Salazar decided to retire from the sport due to long-standing knee problems and to focus on his academic and business ventures (he owns a restaurant).
