= Ulises Mendívil =

Mexican footballer (born 1980)

Personal information
- Full name: Ulises Mendívil Armenta
- Date of birth: 3 September 1980 (age 46)
- Place of birth: San Carlos, Mexico
- Height: 1.86 m (6 ft 1 in)
- Position: Striker

Senior career*
Years	Team	Apps	(Gls)
2003–2008	Atlas	65	(14)
2006–2007	→ Jaguares (loan)	17	(1)
2009–2010	Pachuca	32	(14)
2010	Atlante	10	(0)
2011	Necaxa	6	(0)
2011	Irapuato	6	(0)
2012–13	Altamira	2	(1)
2013–2014	Xelajú	39	(13)
- * Club domestic league appearances and goals

Ulises Mendívil Armenta (Spanish pronunciation: [uˈlises mendiˈβil], born 3 September 1980) is a Mexican former professional footballer who played as a striker.
