= Orlando Rodríguez (footballer) =

Panamanian footballer (born 1984)

Personal information
- Full name: Orlando Edmundo Rodríguez Llorente
- Date of birth: 9 August 1984 (age 42)
- Place of birth: Colón, Panama
- Height: 1.80 m (5 ft 11 in)
- Position: Forward

Senior career*
Years	Team	Apps	(Gls)
2003–2004	Árabe Unido	23	(14)
2005	Deportivo Pereira	18	(2)
2006	Envigado	3	(0)
2006–2007	Árabe Unido	29	(7)
2007	La Equidad	7	(2)
2007–2008	FAS	30	(14)
2008–2010	Árabe Unido	63	(50)
2011	→ León de Huánuco (loan)	8	(1)
2011–2012	Árabe Unido		
2013	Alianza	14	(3)
2013	Árabe Unido	11	(0)
2014	San Francisco	13	(1)

International career^{‡}
2004–2013	Panama	16	(1)
- * Club domestic league appearances and goals as of 16:55, 21 March 2009 (UTC) ‡ National team caps and goals as of 1 August 2015

Orlando Edmundo Rodríguez Llorente (born 9 August 1984) is a Panamanian footballer.

== Club career ==
Nicknamed Papi, Rodríguez played the majority of his career for hometown club Árabe Unido. He had spells in Colombia with Deportivo Pereira, Envigado and La Equidad and joined Salvadoran club FAS in October 2007.

In January 2010 he failed a medical test at Honduran giants Real España due to an ankle injury.

He moved abroad again to play on loan for Peruvian side León de Huánuco in February 2011, but in June 2011 his contract was terminated by mutual consent. In January 2013 he returned to El Salvador to play for Alianza, but was back at Árabe Unido in June 2013.

In January 2014 he joined San Francisco from Árabe Unido after not scoring a single goal in 11 outings for the club in the Apertura 2013, but he was released in summer 2014 after scoring only once for Sanfra.

== International career ==
He played at the 2003 FIFA World Youth Championship in the United Arab Emirates.

Rodríguez made his senior debut for Panama in a December 2004 friendly match against Iran and has earned a total of 16 caps, scoring 1 goal. He represented his country in 2 FIFA World Cup qualification matches and played at the 2009 CONCACAF Gold Cup.

His final international was a January 2013 Copa Centroamericana match against Guatemala.

=== International goals ===
Scores and results list Panama's goal tally first.

#	Date	Venue	Opponent	Score	Result	Competition
1	10 January 2013	Estadio Rommel Fernández, Panama City, Panama	Guatemala	3–0	3–0	Friendly match

== Honors ==
Club

=== National Titles ===
- Liga Panameña de Fútbol: Apertura 2009 II
