= Édgar Benítez =

Paraguayan footballer (born 1987)

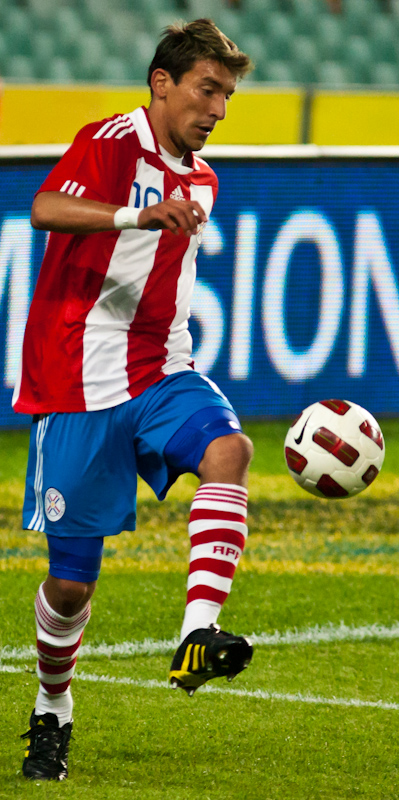

Personal information
- Full name: Édgar Milciades Benítez Santander
- Date of birth: 8 November 1987 (age 39)
- Place of birth: Repatriación, Caaguazú, Paraguay
- Height: 1.76 m (5 ft 9 in)
- Position: Midfielder

Senior career*
Years	Team	Apps	(Gls)
2005–2007	Libertad	32	(2)
2008	→ Sol de América (loan)	37	(21)
2009–2013	Pachuca	85	(21)
2011–2012	→ Cerro Porteño (loan)	44	(11)
2012–2013	→ Toluca (loan)	38	(6)
2013–2015	Toluca	71	(15)
2015–2018	Queretaro	71	(8)
2018–2019	Libertad	47	(12)
2020	Guaraní	18	(1)
2021	Sportivo Luqueño	18	(4)
2021–2022	Alianza Lima	31	(2)
2023	General Caballero JLM	15	(0)
2023–2024	UCV	38	(3)
2025	Rubio Ñu	8	(1)

International career^{‡}
2006–2007	Paraguay U20		
2008–2017	Paraguay	56	(9)
- * Club domestic league appearances and goals as of 18 September 2024 ‡ National team caps and goals as of 2 June 2017

Édgar Milciades Benítez Santander (Spanish pronunciation: [ˈeðɣaɾ βeˈnites]; born 8 November 1987), nicknamed Pájaro ([ˈpaxaɾo]; bird), is a Paraguayan footballer who plays as a midfielder. He also holds Mexican citizenship. A Paraguayan international on 56 occasions since 2008, he represented his country at the FIFA World Cup 2010 and two Copa América tournaments. In 2006, he won the Milk Cup with Paraguay's under-20 team.

== Career ==
=== Club ===
Benítez started his career in Club 12 de Octubre of Itaugua before moving to Libertad in 2005, where he won the Paraguayan 1st division tournament although he mostly played as a substitute. In 2008, he was signed by Sol de América and quickly established himself in the club, being one of the team's top goalscorers.

On 1 December 2008, it was announced that Benítez will play in the Mexican League for Pachuca CF. He made his debut with C.F. Pachuca on 2 January in the Interliga 2009, scoring his first goal with the club in the 4–0 win over Tecos UAG. He would end the tournament as the top goalscorer with 4 goals in 4 games, helping Pachuca obtain a spot in the qualifying round for the Copa Libertadores 2009.

Since 2009 he wasn't considered as a starter for Pachuca. He is mainly used as a substitute for every match. He has participated constantly in Pachuca's matches in Bicentenario 2010. On 20 February 2010 he started a match against Chiapas. He scored twice in this game and Pachuca secured a 2–2. In June, 2015, Queretaro announced that Benítez would play for them for the upcoming season.

== National team ==
In the 2006 Milk Cup, he scored in the 60th minute in a 2–0 victory over the USA.

He played first international match in 2008. Due to his good performances with Sol de América he was called for the Paraguay national football team and had a good debut, playing in his first 2010 World Cup qualification match against Peru in which Paraguay won 1–0.

He was included in Paraguay's squad for the 2015 Copa América, scoring the only goal of a 1–0 win against Jamaica in the team's second group match on 16 June 2015.

He scored the second goal for Paraguay in a 2–2 draw against Brazil for the nation's campaign to qualify for the 2018 FIFA World Cup in Russia.

=== International goals ===
Updated 29 March 2016

#	Date	Venue	Opponent	Score	Final	Competition
1.	1 October 2008	Estadio Defensores del Chaco, Asunción, Paraguay	Peru	1-0	1-0	2010 FIFA World Cup qualification
2.	1 April 2009	Olímpico Atahualpa, Quito, Ecuador	Ecuador	1–1	1–1	2010 FIFA World Cup qualification
3.	21 December 2011	Estadio La Portada, La Serena, Chile	Chile	1–1	3–2	Friendly
4.	15 February 2012	Estadio Feliciano Cáceres, Luque, Paraguay	Chile	1–0	2–0	Friendly
5.	22 February 2012	Estadio Feliciano Cáceres, Luque, Paraguay	Guatemala	1–0	2–1	Friendly
6.	22 March 2013	Estadio Centenario, Montevideo, Uruguay	Uruguay	1–1	1–1	2014 FIFA World Cup qualification
7.	11 October 2013	CTE Cachamay, Ciudad Guayana, Venezuela	Venezuela	0–1	1–1	2014 FIFA World Cup qualification
8.	16 June 2015	Estadio Regional de Antofagasta, Antofagasta, Chile	Jamaica	1–0	1–0	2015 Copa América
9.	29 March 2016	Estadio Defensores del Chaco, Asunción, Paraguay	Brazil	2–0	2–2	2018 FIFA World Cup qualification

== Honours ==
Libertad

- Paraguayan Primera División: 2006, 2007

Pachuca

- CONCACAF Champions League: 2009–10

Cerro Porteño

- Paraguayan Primera División: 2012 Apertura

Querétaro

- Copa MX: Apertura 2016
- Supercopa MX: 2017

Alianza Lima

- Peruvian Primera División: 2021, 2022
- Peruvian Torneo Clausura: 2021
