= 2002–03 Pumas UNAM season =

Pumas UNAM
2002–03 season
- Manager: Hugo Sánchez
- Stadium: Estadio Olímpico Universitario
- Apertura: Semifinals (3rd)
- Clausura: 15th
- Copa Libertadores: Round of 16
- Top goalscorer: League: Mariano Trujillo (12 goals); All: Álvaro González; Mariano Trujillo (14 goals)
- Biggest win: Pumas UNAM 7–1 Guadalajara (19 October 2002)
- Biggest defeat: Atlas 6–0 Pumas UNAM (31 August 2002)

The 2002–03 season was Pumas UNAM's 49th season in existence and their 41st consecutive season in the top flight of Mexican football. The club participated in the Apertura and Clausura tournaments of the Mexican Primera División and in the 2003 Copa Libertadores.

Pumas UNAM had a good first semester, classifying to the playoffs as the third best team from the regular season. In the playoffs, the defeated Cruz Azul in the quarterfinals but were eliminated by Morelia at the semifinals. The next tournament, however, the Pumas had a mediocre performance, finishing 15th in the tournament.

Internationally, Pumas UNAM debuted on the Copa Libertadores. After winning the Pre Libertadores mini tournament, the team made its presentation in the continental tournament losing 2–3 against Grêmio on their first match, but managed to advance to the round of 16, being eliminated by Chilean side Cobreloa.

== Players ==
=== Apertura ===
No.	Pos.	Nat.	Name	Date of birth (age)	Since
1	GK	(Mexico)	Esdras Rangel	31 July 1977 (aged 25)	1995
2	DF	(Mexico)	Amado López	2 May 1981 (aged 21)	2000
3	DF	(Mexico)	Joaquín Beltrán (Captain)	29 April 1977 (aged 25)	1996
4	DF	(Mexico)	Horacio Cervantes	17 October 1981 (aged 20)	2000
5	DF	(Mexico)	Rodrigo Barragán	28 November 1979 (aged 22)	2000
6	MF	(Mexico)	Miguel España	31 January 1964 (aged 38)	2001
7	MF	(Brazil)	Leandro Augusto	18 August 1977 (aged 24)	2001
8	MF	(Mexico)	Luis Ignacio González	28 June 1980 (aged 22)	2001
9	FW	(Uruguay)	Álvaro González	12 September 1973 (aged 28)	2002
10	MF	(Uruguay)	Rodrigo Lemos	3 October 1973 (aged 28)	2002
11	MF	(Mexico)	José Luis López	19 October 1979 (aged 22)	2001
12	GK	(Mexico)	Sergio Bernal	9 February 1970 (aged 32)	2002
13	GK	(Mexico)	Odín Patiño	24 August 1983 (aged 18)	2002
14	FW	(Mexico)	Horacio Sánchez	6 July 1978 (aged 24)	2002
15	MF	(Mexico)	Israel Castro	20 December 1980 (aged 21)	2002
16	MF	(Mexico)	Gerardo Galindo	23 May 1978 (aged 24)	1997
17	MF	(Mexico)	David Toledo	18 April 1982 (aged 20)	2001
18	FW	(Mexico)	Rafael Márquez Lugo	2 November 1981 (aged 20)	2000
19	MF	(Mexico)	Mariano Trujillo	19 May 1977 (aged 25)	2001
20	MF	(Uruguay)	Martín García	26 March 1976 (aged 26)	2002
21	MF	(Mexico)	Jaime Lozano	29 September 1978 (aged 23)	2002
22	DF	(Mexico)	Manuel de la Torre	13 June 1980 (aged 22)	1999
23	DF	(Mexico)	Raúl Alpizar	1 February 1977 (aged 25)	1997
24	MF	(Mexico)	Hugo García	14 September 1981 (aged 20)	2001
25	FW	(Brazil)	Emerson dos Santos	29 July 1980 (aged 22)	2002
26	FW	(Mexico)	Francisco Fonseca	2 October 1979 (aged 22)	2002

=== Clausura ===
No.	Pos.	Nat.	Name	Date of birth (age)	Since
1	GK	(Mexico)	Esdras Rangel	31 July 1977 (aged 25)	1995
2	DF	(Mexico)	Amado López	2 May 1981 (aged 21)	2000
3	DF	(Mexico)	Joaquín Beltrán (Captain)	29 April 1977 (aged 25)	1996
4	DF	(Mexico)	Horacio Cervantes	17 October 1981 (aged 21)	2000
5	DF	(Mexico)	Rodrigo Barragán	28 November 1979 (aged 23)	2000
6	MF	(Mexico)	Miguel España	31 January 1964 (aged 38)	2001
7	MF	(Brazil)	Leandro Augusto	18 August 1977 (aged 25)	2001
8	MF	(Mexico)	Luis Ignacio González	28 June 1980 (aged 22)	2001
9	FW	(Uruguay)	Álvaro González	12 September 1973 (aged 29)	2002
10	MF	(Uruguay)	Rodrigo Lemos	3 October 1973 (aged 29)	2002
11	MF	(Mexico)	José Luis López	19 October 1979 (aged 23)	2001
12	GK	(Mexico)	Sergio Bernal	9 February 1970 (aged 32)	2002
14	FW	(Mexico)	Horacio Sánchez	6 July 1978 (aged 24)	2002
15	MF	(Mexico)	Israel Castro	20 December 1980 (aged 22)	2002
16	MF	(Mexico)	Gerardo Galindo	23 May 1978 (aged 24)	1997
19	MF	(Mexico)	Mariano Trujillo	19 May 1977 (aged 25)	2001
20	MF	(Uruguay)	Martín García	26 March 1976 (aged 26)	2002
21	MF	(Mexico)	Jaime Lozano	29 September 1978 (aged 24)	2002
22	DF	(Mexico)	Manuel de la Torre	13 June 1980 (aged 22)	1999
24	MF	(Mexico)	Hugo García	14 September 1981 (aged 21)	2001
25	MF	(Brazil)	Aílton da Silva	8 September 1977 (aged 25)	2003
26	FW	(Mexico)	Francisco Fonseca	2 October 1979 (aged 23)	2002
28	FW	(Mexico)	Anuar Gómez	3 December 1981 (aged 21)	2003
31	GK	(Mexico)	Alejandro Palacios	6 March 1981 (aged 21)	2003

== Transfers ==
=== In ===
No.	Pos.	Nat.	Player	Moving from	Type	Transfer window	Ref.
9	FW	(Uruguay)	Álvaro González	(Uruguay) Bella Vista	Transfer	Summer	
12	GK	(Mexico)	Sergio Bernal	Puebla	Loan return	Summer	
13	GK	(Mexico)	Odín Patiño	Academy	Promotion	Summer	
14	FW	(Mexico)	Horacio Sánchez	León	Loan return	Summer	
20	MF	(Uruguay)	Martín García	(Uruguay) Peñarol	Transfer	Summer	
21	MF	(Mexico)	Jaime Lozano	Celaya	Loan return	Summer	
26	FW	(Mexico)	Francisco Fonseca	La Piedad	Transfer	Summer	
25	MF	(Brazil)	Aílton da Silva	(Italy) Bari	Transfer	Summer	
31	GK	(Mexico)	Alejandro Palacios	Academy	Promotion	Summer	

=== Out ===
No.	Pos.	Nat.	Player	Moving to	Type	Transfer window	Ref.
–	DF	(Mexico)	Christian Ramírez	Toluca	Transfer	Summer	
18	FW	(Mexico)	Rafael Márquez Lugo	Chiapas	Transfer	Winter	
23	DF	(Mexico)	Raúl Alpizar	Querétaro	Transfer	Winter	
25	FW	(Brazil)	Emerson dos Santos	Tabasco	Transfer	Winter	

== Competitions ==
=== Overview ===
Competition	First match	Last match	Starting round	Final position	Record							
Competition	First match	Last match	Starting round	Final position	Pld	W	D	L	GF	GA	GD	Win %
Apertura	3 August 2002	21 December 2002	Matchday 1	Semifinals (3rd)	23	12	4	7	44	42	+2	52.17
Clausura	12 January 2003	18 May 2003	Matchday 1	15th	19	4	8	7	25	35	−10	21.05
Copa Libertadores	22 October 2002	8 May 2003	Pre Libertadores	Round of 16	14	7	2	5	20	13	+7	50.00
Total					56	23	14	19	89	90	−1	41.07

Source: Mediotiempo.com

=== Torneo Apertura ===
==== League table ====
Pos	Team	Pld	W	D	L	GF	GA	GD	Pts	Qualification
1	América	19	13	4	2	34	14	+20	43	Directly qualified to the Liguilla (Playoffs)
2	Toluca	19	12	5	2	55	25	+30	41	Directly qualified to the Liguilla (Playoffs)
3	Pumas UNAM	19	10	3	6	39	35	+4	33	Directly qualified to the Liguilla (Playoffs)
4	Morelia	19	9	5	5	35	23	+12	32	Directly qualified to the Liguilla (Playoffs)
5	UAG	19	8	5	6	26	29	−3	29	Directly qualified to the Liguilla (Playoffs)

Source: MedioTiempo

==== Matches ====
3 August 2002 1	Celaya	0–1	Pumas UNAM	Celaya, Guanajuato
15:00		Report	Márquez Lugo 88'	Stadium: Estadio Miguel Alemán Valdés; Referee: José Luis Camargo

11 August 2002 2	Pumas UNAM	2–1	Veracruz	Coyoacán, Mexico City
12:00	L. González 9'; Barragán 23'	Report	Arce 37'	Stadium: Estadio Olímpico Universitario

17 August 2002 3	Monterrey	1–2	Pumas UNAM	Monterrey, Nuevo León
19:00	Erviti 53'	Report	Leandro Augusto 57'; Márquez Lugo 83'	Stadium: Estadio Tecnológico; Referee: José de Jesús Robles

25 August 2002 4	Pumas UNAM	1–4	Toluca	Coyoacán, Mexico City
12:00	Espinosa 57' (o.g.)	Report	Sinha 23'; Cardozo 30'; García 62'; Sánchez 67'	Stadium: Estadio Olímpico Universitario; Referee: Marco Antonio Rodríguez

31 August 2002 5	Atlas	6–0	Pumas UNAM	Guadalajara, Jalisco
19:00	Valenzuela 5', 46'; Calderón 42', 78'; Méndez 79'; J. García 84'	Report		Stadium: Estadio Jalisco; Referee: Felipe Ramos Rizo

8 September 2002 6	Pumas UNAM	1–1	Querétaro	Coyoacán, Mexico City
12:00	Trujillo 87'	Report	A. García 76'	Stadium: Estadio Olímpico Universitario; Referee: Germán Arredondo

11 September 2002 7	Puebla	0–1	Pumas UNAM	Puebla City, Puebla
20:00		Report	Lemos 76'	Stadium: Estadio Cuauhtémoc; Referee: Gilberto Alcalá

14 September 2002 8	Pumas UNAM	1–3	América	Coyoacán, Mexico City
12:00	A. González 44'	Report	Patiño 25', 47', 61'	Stadium: Estadio Olímpico Universitario; Referee: Eduardo Brizio

21 September 2002 9	Chiapas	0–2	Pumas UNAM	Tuxtla Gutiérrez, Chiapas
15:00		Report	Lemos 10'; Leandro Augusto 21'	Stadium: Estadio Víctor Manuel Reyna; Referee: Paul Delgadillo

29 September 2002 10	Pumas UNAM	2–2	Cruz Azul	Coyoacán, Mexico City
12:00	Trujillo 60', 65' (pen.)	Report	Cabrera 33'; Cacho 45'	Stadium: Estadio Olímpico Universitario; Referee: Armando Archundia

6 October 2002 11	UAG	4–3	Pumas UNAM	Zapopan, Jalisco
16:00	Camps 19'; Palacios 36'; Donizete 84'; Hernández 88'	Report	Leandro Augusto 21'; Lozano 40'; dos Santos 43'	Stadium: Estadio Tres de Marzo; Referee: Gilberto Alcalá

13 October 2002 12	Pumas UNAM	3–2	UANL	Coyoacán, Mexico City
12:00	J. López 52', 86'; Trujillo 72'	Report	Olalde 63'; Irênio 68'	Stadium: Estadio Olímpico Universitario; Referee: Jorge Eduardo Gasso

16 October 2002 13	Pachuca	0–3	Pumas UNAM	Pachuca, Hidalgo
20:00		Report	Leandro Augusto 7'; A. González 79'; Trujillo 86'	Stadium: Estadio Hidalgo; Referee: Hugo León Guajardo

19 October 2002 14	Pumas UNAM	7–1	Guadalajara	Coyoacán, Mexico City
17:00	Trujillo 7', 20', 64'; A. González 12'; Lozano 33'; L. González 61'	Report	Bravo 11'	Stadium: Estadio Olímpico Universitario; Referee: Marco Antonio Rodríguez

27 October 2002 15	San Luis	6–3	Pumas UNAM	San Luis Potosí City, San Luis Potosí
16:00	J. García 24', 57'; de Faria 66', 68', 71'; Milián 76'	Report	A. González 50'; Lemos 52'; Barragán 63'	Stadium: Estadio Alfonso Lastras; Referee: José Abramo Lira

3 November 2002 16	Pumas UNAM	1–0	Santos Laguna	Coyoacán, Mexico City
12:00	A. González 49'	Report		Stadium: Estadio Olímpico Universitario; Referee: Felipe Ramos Rizo

9 November 2002 17	Necaxa	1–0	Pumas UNAM	Tlalpan, Mexico City
19:00	Luna 21'	Report		Stadium: Estadio Azteca; Referee: Jorge Eduardo Gasso

16 November 2002 18	Pumas UNAM	4–1	Atlante	Coyoacán, Mexico City
19:00	A. González 5'; Lemos 24', 40', 73'	Report	González 82'	Stadium: Estadio Olímpico Universitario; Referee: Antonio Marrufo

24 November 2002 19	Morelia	2–2	Pumas UNAM	Morelia, Michoacán
16:00	Saavedra 25'; Alex Fernandes 49'	Report	J. López 85'; dos Santos 88'	Stadium: Estadio Morelos; Referee: Eduardo Brizio

==== Playoffs ====
===== Quarterfinals =====
4 December 2002 First leg	Cruz Azul	0–0	Pumas UNAM	Benito Juárez, Mexico City
18:00		Report		Stadium: Estadio Azul; Referee: Eduardo Brizio

8 December 2002 Second leg	Pumas UNAM	3–2 (3–2 agg.)	Cruz Azul	Coyoacán, Mexico City
12:00	A. González 15', 42'; Brown 80' (o.g.)	Report	Abreu 51'; Cabrera 84'	Stadium: Estadio Olímpico Universitario; Referee: Felipe Ramos Rizo

===== Semifinals =====
12 December 2002 First leg	Morelia	4–0	Pumas UNAM	Morelia, Michoacán
20:00	Bautista 14', 55'; Saavedra 29'; Alex Fernandes 43'	Report		Stadium: Estadio Morelos; Referee: Eduardo Brizio

15 December 2002 Second leg	Pumas UNAM	2–1 (2–5 agg.)	Morelia	Coyoacán, Mexico City
12:00	Lemos 32'; A. González 45'	Report	Bautista 39'	Stadium: Estadio Olímpico Universitario; Referee: Felipe Ramos Rizo

=== Torneo Clausura ===
==== League table ====
Pos	Team	Pld	W	D	L	GF	GA	GD	Pts
13	Cuernavaca	19	6	5	8	24	27	−3	23
14	Pachuca	19	4	9	6	21	23	−2	21
15	UNAM	19	4	8	7	25	35	−10	20
16	San Luis	19	5	5	9	25	38	−13	20
17	Chiapas	19	5	4	10	15	26	−11	19

Source: MedioTiempo

==== Matches ====
12 January 2003 1	Pumas UNAM	1–3	Cuernavaca	Coyoacán, Mexico City
12:00	Lemos 42'	Report	Flores 6'; Claudinho 14'; Gallaga 83'	Stadium: Estadio Olímpico Universitario; Referee: Manuel Glower

18 January 2003 2	Veracruz	0–0	Pumas UNAM	Boca del Río, Veracruz
15:00		Report		Stadium: Estadio Luis "Pirata" Fuente; Referee: Jorge Eduardo Gasso

26 January 2003 3	Pumas UNAM	2–3	Monterrey	Coyoacán, Mexico City
12:00	Aílton 7'; García 76'	Report	Alex Fernandes 60'; Franco 73', 86'	Stadium: Estadio Olímpico Universitario; Referee: Gilberto Alcalá

1 February 2003 4	Toluca	5–1	Pumas UNAM	Toluca, State of Mexico
15:00	Cardozo 50', 80'; Sánchez 73', 78', 84'	Report	Trujillo 74'	Stadium: Estadio Nemesio Díez; Referee: Hugo León Guajardo

16 February 2003 5	Querétaro	0–0	Pumas UNAM	Querétaro City, Querétaro
12:00		Report		Stadium: Estadio Corregidora; Referee: Francisco Caspeta

23 February 2003 7	Pumas UNAM	1–0	Puebla	Coyoacán, Mexico City
20:30	Lemos 22'	Report		Stadium: Estadio Olímpico Universitario; Referee: Manuel Glower

26 February 2003 6	Pumas UNAM	2–1	Atlas	Coyoacán, Mexico City
20:30	Leandro Augusto 12'; Fonseca 41'	Report	Veiga 55'	Stadium: Estadio Olímpico Universitario; Referee: Felipe Ramos Rizo

2 March 2003 8	América	1–1	Pumas UNAM	Tlalpan, Mexico City
16:00	Castillo 17'	Report	Trujillo 33'	Stadium: Estadio Azteca; Referee: José Abramo Lira

6 March 2003 9	Pumas UNAM	3–1	Chiapas	Coyoacán, Mexico City
20:30	Trujillo 7'; García 58'; Aílton 78'	Report	Ramírez 63'	Stadium: Estadio Olímpico Universitario; Referee: Armando Archundia

16 March 2003 10	Cruz Azul	2–0	Pumas UNAM	Benito Juárez, Mexico City
12:00	Cacho 18', 57'	Report		Stadium: Estadio Azul; Referee: Hugo León Guajardo

29 March 2003 12	UANL	2–2	Pumas UNAM	San Nicolás de los Garza, Nuevo León
17:00	Soares 10'; Sánchez 75'	Report	A. González 37'; Fonseca 88'	Stadium: Estadio Universitario; Referee: Gilberto Alcalá

6 April 2003 13	Pumas UNAM	1–1	Pachuca	Coyoacán, Mexico City
12:00	Lozano 90'	Report	Santana 58'	Stadium: Estadio Olímpico Universitario; Referee: Armando Archundia

13 April 2003 14	Guadalajara	1–1	Pumas UNAM	Guadalajara, Jalisco
12:00	J. García 89'	Report	Lozano 85'	Stadium: Estadio Jalisco; Referee: Marco Antonio Rodríguez

16 April 2003 11	Pumas UNAM	2–1	UAG	Coyoacán, Mexico City
18:00	Lemos 14'; Gómez 88'	Report	Santillana 76'	Stadium: Estadio Olímpico Universitario; Referee: Felipe Ramos Rizo

20 April 2003 15	Pumas UNAM	2–2	San Luis	Coyoacán, Mexico City
12:00	Trujillo 25'; Fonseca 76'	Report	Silva 62'; Salcedo 89'	Stadium: Estadio Olímpico Universitario; Referee: Germán Arredondo

27 April 2003 16	Santos Laguna	4–1	Pumas UNAM	Guadalajara, Jalisco
16:00	Borgetti 25'; Castro 62' (o.g.); Ruiz 67'; Altamirano 81'	Report	García 88'	Stadium: Estadio Jalisco; Referee: José Abramo Lira

4 May 2003 17	Pumas UNAM	4–4	Necaxa	Coyoacán, Mexico City
12:00	Fonseca 1', 32', 37'; García 41'	Report	Luna 46'; Martínez 49'; Sosa 51'; Alves 62'	Stadium: Estadio Olímpico Universitario; Referee: Gilberto Alcalá

11 May 2003 18	Atlante	3–1	Pumas UNAM	Ciudad Nezahualcóyotl, State of Mexico
12:00	Rubirosa 5'; Padilla 48'; Macías 72'	Report	Leandro Augusto 73'	Stadium: Estadio Neza 86; Referee: Marco Antonio Rodríguez

18 May 2003 19	Pumas UNAM	0–1	Morelia	Coyoacán, Mexico City
12:00		Report	Navia 69' (pen.)	Stadium: Estadio Olímpico Universitario; Attendance: Hugo León Guajardo

=== Copa Libertadores ===
==== Pre Libertadores ====
From 1998 to 2002, Mexican and Venezuelan clubs played a mini tournament known as Copa Pre Libertadores to determine two teams that would qualify to the next year's Copa Libertadores group stage. In 2002, Pumas UNAM participated in the Pre Libertadores trying to earn a spot in the 2003 edition of the tournament.

Pos	Team	Pld	W	D	L	GF	GA	GD	Pts	Qualification
1	(Mexico) Pumas UNAM	6	4	1	1	12	4	+8	13	Advance to group stage
2	(Mexico) Cruz Azul	6	3	2	1	11	7	+4	11	Advance to group stage
3	(Venezuela) Estudiantes de Mérida	6	2	1	3	7	9	−2	7	
4	(Venezuela) Nacional Táchira	6	1	0	5	6	16	−10	3	

Source: CONMEBOL

22 October 2002 1	Estudiantes de Mérida (Venezuela)	1–0	(Mexico) Pumas UNAM	Mérida, Venezuela
16:00	Panigutti 70'	Report		Stadium: Estadio Guillermo Soto Rosa; Referee: Eduardo Lecca (Peru)

24 October 2002 2	Nacional Táchira (Venezuela)	1–2	(Mexico) Pumas UNAM	Mérida, Venezuela
16:00	Clóvis Bento 15'	Report	Beltrán 77'; A. González 85'	Stadium: Estadio Guillermo Soto Rosa; Referee: Víctor Rivera (Peru)

6 November 2002 3	Pumas UNAM (Mexico)	1–1	(Mexico) Cruz Azul	Mexico City, Mexico
	P. Campos 43' (o.g.)	Report	Ledesma 40'	Stadium: Estadio Olímpico Universitario; Referee: Gilberto Alcalá (Mexico)

12 November 2002 4	Pumas UNAM (Mexico)	3–1	(Venezuela) Estudiantes de Mérida	Mexico City, Mexico
16:00	A. González 23', 90'; J. López 28'	Report	Panigutti 46'	Stadium: Estadio Olímpico Universitario; Referee: Fernando Paneso (Colombia)

19 November 2002 5	Pumas UNAM (Mexico)	4–0	(Venezuela) Nacional Táchira	Mexico City, Mexico
16:00	L. González 17'; J. López 46'; Lozano 57'; Trujillo 71' (pen.)	Report		Stadium: Estadio Olímpico Universitario; Referee: Rubén Selman (Chile)

28 November 2002 6	Cruz Azul (Mexico)	0–2	(Mexico) Pumas UNAM	Mexico City, Mexico
		Report	Fonseca 51'; España 90+2'	Stadium: Estadio Azul; Referee: Felipe Ramos Rizo (Mexico)

==== Group stage ====
Pos	Team	Pld	W	D	L	GF	GA	GD	Pts
1	(Brazil) Grêmio	6	3	1	2	10	7	+3	10
2	(Mexico) Pumas UNAM	6	3	0	3	8	8	0	9
3	(Bolivia) Bolívar	6	3	0	3	8	9	−1	9
4	(Uruguay) Peñarol	6	2	1	3	12	14	−2	7

4 February 2003 1	Grêmio (Brazil)	3–2	(Mexico) Pumas UNAM	Porto Alegre, Brazil
21:10	Luís Mário 30'; Lozano 34' (o.g.); Roger 89'	Report	Beltrán 22'; Leandro Augusto 75'	Stadium: Estádio Olímpico Monumental; Referee: Claudio Martín (Argentina)

11 February 2003 2	Pumas UNAM (Mexico)	2–0	(Bolivia) Bolívar	Mexico City, Mexico
20:30	L. González 32'; J. López 65'	Report		Stadium: Estadio Olímpico Universitario; Attendance: 25,000; Referee: José Carpio (Ecuador)

11 March 2003 3	Peñarol (Uruguay)	2–0	(Mexico) Pumas UNAM	Montevideo, Uruguay
21:30	Estoyanoff 31'; de Souza 59'	Report		Stadium: Estadio Centenario; Referee: Epifanio González (Paraguay)

20 March 2003 4	Pumas UNAM (Mexico)	1–0	(Brazil) Grêmio	Mexico City, Mexico
20:40	A. González 79'	Report		Stadium: Estadio Olímpico Universitario; Attendance: 40,000; Referee: Óscar Ruiz (Colombia)

26 March 2003 5	Bolívar (Bolivia)	2–0	(Mexico) Pumas UNAM	La Paz, Bolivia
16:10	Gutiérrez 1'; Sandy 63'	Report		Stadium: Estadio Hernando Siles; Referee: Mauricio Reinoso (Ecuador)

10 April 2003 6	Pumas UNAM (Mexico)	3–1	(Uruguay) Peñarol	Mexico City, Mexico
17:05	Fonseca 53', 77'; Trujillo 81'	Report	de Souza 18'	Stadium: Estadio Olímpico Universitario; Attendance: 50,000; Referee: Héctor Baldassi (Argentina)

==== Knockout phase ====
===== Round of 16 =====
24 April 2003 First leg	Pumas UNAM (Mexico)	0–1	(Chile) Cobreloa	Mexico City, Mexico
21:30		Report	Díaz 49'	Stadium: Estadio Olímpico Universitario; Attendance: 58,000; Referee: Wilson Souza Mendonça (Brazil)

8 May 2003 Second leg	Cobreloa (Chile)	0–0 (1–0 agg.)	(Mexico) Pumas UNAM	Calama, Chile
18:10		Report		Stadium: Estadio Municipal de Calama; Attendance: 17,500; Referee: Gustavo Méndez (Uruguay)

== Statistics ==
=== Appearances and goals ===
No.	Pos.	Player	Total		Apertura		Clausura		Copa Libertadores	
No.	Pos.	Player	Apps	Goals	Apps	Goals	Apps	Goals	Apps	Goals
1	GK	(Mexico) Esdras Rangel	23	0	11	0	6	0	6	0
2	DF	(Mexico) Amado López	26	0	9	0	8	0	9	0
3	DF	(Mexico) Joaquín Beltrán	51	2	20	0	17	0	14	2
4	DF	(Mexico) Horacio Cervantes	7	0	1	0	3	0	3	0
5	DF	(Mexico) Rodrigo Barragán	33	2	23	2	5	0	5	0
6	MF	(Mexico) Miguel España	17	1	10	0	3	0	4	1
7	MF	(Brazil) Leandro Augusto	46	7	17	4	18	2	11	1
8	MF	(Mexico) Luis Ignacio González	43	4	19	2	13	0	11	2
9	FW	(Uruguay) Álvaro González	46	14	19	9	15	1	12	4
10	MF	(Uruguay) Rodrigo Lemos	39	10	19	7	10	3	10	0
11	MF	(Mexico) José Luis López	40	6	17	3	14	0	9	3
12	GK	(Mexico) Sergio Bernal	32	0	10	0	13	0	9	0
13	GK	(Mexico) Odín Patiño	2	0	2	0	0	0	0	0
14	FW	(Mexico) Horacio Sánchez	12	0	5	0	6	0	1	0
15	MF	(Mexico) Israel Castro	40	0	12	0	19	0	9	0
16	MF	(Mexico) Gerardo Galindo	51	0	20	0	18	0	13	0
17	MF	(Mexico) David Toledo	3	0	3	0	0	0	0	0
19	MF	(Mexico) Mariano Trujillo	49	14	19	8	16	4	14	2
20	MF	(Uruguay) Martín García	27	4	10	0	12	4	5	0
21	MF	(Mexico) Jaime Lozano	43	5	16	2	14	2	13	1
22	DF	(Mexico) Manuel de la Torre	49	0	22	0	18	0	9	0
24	MF	(Mexico) Hugo García	2	0	1	0	1	0	0	0
25	MF	(Brazil) Aílton da Silva	26	2	–	–	16	2	10	0
26	FW	(Mexico) Francisco Fonseca	29	9	7	0	13	6	9	3
28	FW	(Mexico) Anuar Gómez	1	1	–	–	1	1	0	0
31	GK	(Mexico) Alejandro Palacios	2	0	–	–	1	0	1	0
Players that left the club during the season
18	FW	(Mexico) Rafael Márquez Lugo	12	3	12	3	–	–	0	0
23	DF	(Mexico) Raúl Alpizar	11	0	7	0	–	–	4	0
25	FW	(Brazil) Emerson dos Santos	11	2	10	2	–	–	1	0

=== Goalscorers ===
Rank	Pos.	Player	Apertura	Clausura	Copa Libertadores	Total
1	FW	(Uruguay) Álvaro González	9	1	4	14
1	MF	(Mexico) Mariano Trujillo	8	4	2	14
3	MF	(Uruguay) Rodrigo Lemos	7	3	0	10
4	FW	(Mexico) Francisco Fonseca	0	6	3	9
5	MF	(Brazil) Leandro Augusto	4	2	1	7
6	MF	(Mexico) José Luis López	3	0	3	6
7	MF	(Mexico) Jaime Lozano	2	2	1	5
8	FW	(Uruguay) Martín García	0	4	0	4
8	MF	(Mexico) Luis Ignacio González	2	0	2	4
9	FW	(Mexico) Rafael Márquez Lugo	3	–	0	3
11	DF	(Mexico) Rodrigo Barragán	2	0	0	2
11	DF	(Mexico) Joaquín Beltrán	0	0	2	2
11	MF	(Brazil) Aílton da Silva	–	2	0	2
11	FW	(Brazil) Emerson dos Santos	2	–	0	2
15	MF	(Mexico) Miguel España	0	0	1	1
15	FW	(Mexico) Anuar Gómez	–	1	0	1
Own goals			2	0	1	3
Total			44	25	20	89

=== Hat-tricks ===
Player	Against	Result	Date	Competition	Ref.
(Mexico) Mariano Trujillo	Guadalajara	7–1 (H)	19 October 2002	Primera División	
(Uruguay) Rodrigo Lemos	Atlante	4–1 (H)	16 November 2002	Primera División	
(Mexico) Francisco Fonseca	Necaxa	4–4 (H)	4 May 2003	Primera División	

=== Own goals ===
Player	Against	Result	Date	Competition
(Mexico) Jaime Lozano	(Brazil) Grêmio	2–3 (A)	4 February 2003	Copa Libertadores
(Mexico) Israel Castro	Santos Laguna	1–4 (A)	27 April 2003	Primera División
