= 2005 Copa Sudamericana finals =

- Event: 2005 Copa Sudamericana
Pumas UNAM	Boca Juniors
(Mexico)	(Argentina)
2	2
- on aggregate Boca Juniors won 4–3 on penalties

First leg
Pumas UNAM	Boca Juniors
1	1
- Date: 6 December 2005
- Venue: Estadio Olímpico Universitario, Mexico City
- Man of the Match: Rodrigo Palacio
- Referee: Jorge Larrionda (Uruguay)

Second leg
Boca Juniors	Pumas UNAM
1	1
- Date: 18 December 2005
- Venue: La Bombonera, Buenos Aires
- Man of the Match: Roberto Abbondanzieri
- Referee: Carlos Amarilla (Paraguay)

The 2005 Copa Sudamericana finals was a two-legged football match-up to determine the 2005 Copa Sudamericana champion. It was contested by Mexican club Pumas UNAM and Argentinian club Boca Juniors. Boca was defending their trophy and Pumas UNAM were playing in their first Copa Sudamericana finals.

The first leg was played in Estadio Olímpico Universitario in Mexico D.F. on 6 December 6, and the match was tied 1–1. The second leg was played in La Bombonera ("Estadio Alberto J. Armando"), in Buenos Aires on December 18, and, again, the match was tied 1–1, so in the penalty shoot-out Boca won 4–3 and was thus crowned the champions, successfully defending their title. As the winner, Boca earned the right to play in the 2006 Recopa Sudamericana against the winner of the 2005 Copa Libertadores.

== Qualified teams ==
Team	Previous finals app.
(Mexico) Pumas UNAM	None
(Argentina) Boca Juniors	**2004**

Bold indicates winning years

== Venues ==
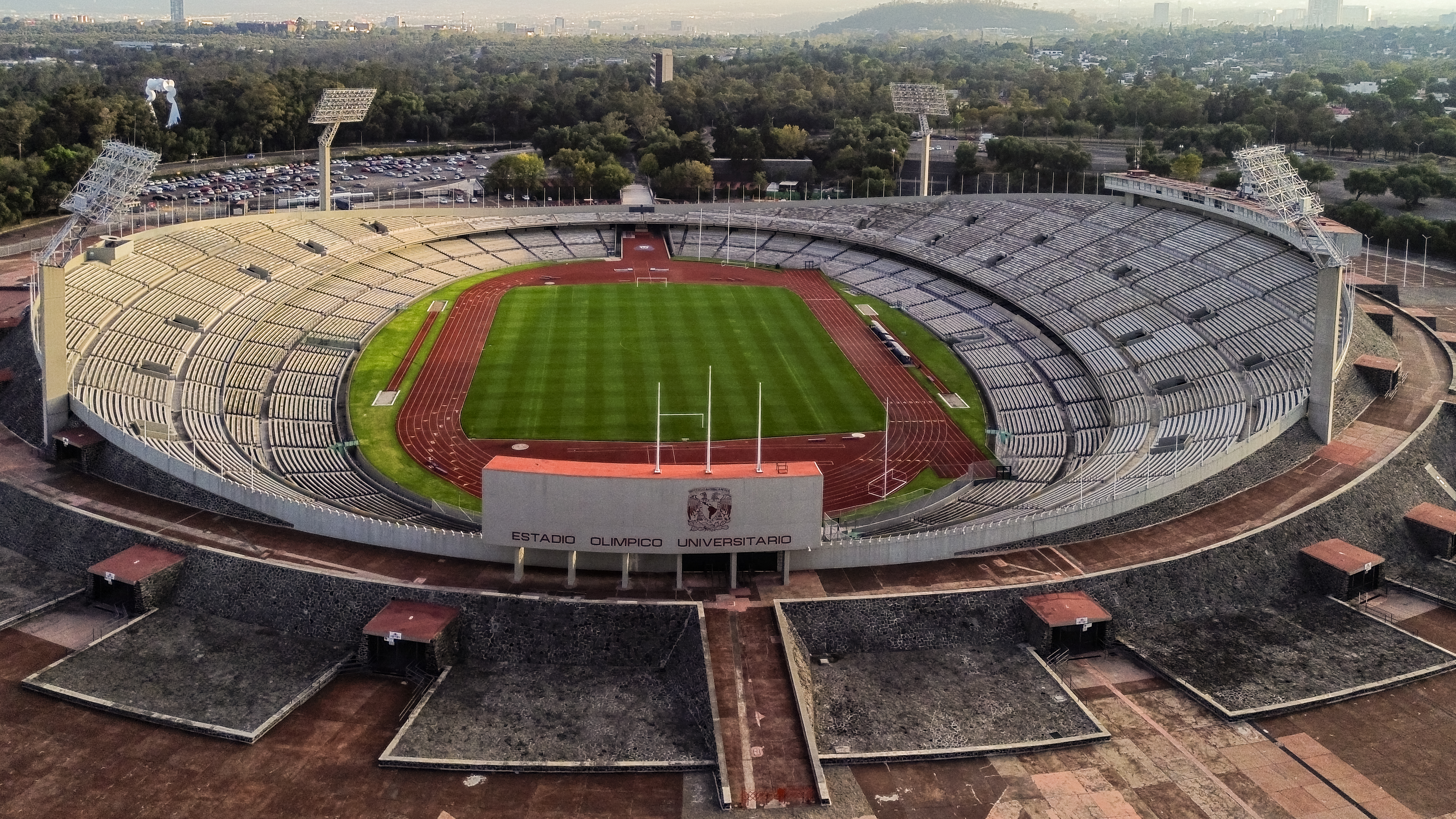
Estadio Olímpico Universitario (left) and La Bombonera, venues for the series

== Road to the finals ==
Pumas UNAM					Boca Juniors			
Opponent	Agg.	1st leg	2nd leg	Round	Opponent	Agg.	1st leg	2nd leg
(Bolivia) The Strongest	4–3	1–2 (A)	3–1 (H)	Round of 16	(Paraguay) Cerro Porteño	7–3	2–2 (A)	5–1 (H)
(Brazil) Corinthians	4–2	1–2 (A)	3–0 (H)	Quarterfinals	(Brazil) Internacional	4–2	0–1 (A)	4–1 (H)
(Argentina) Vélez Sarsfield	4–0	0–0 (A)	4–0 (H)	Semifinals	(Chile) Universidad Católica	3–2	2–2 (H)	1–0 (A)

== Matches ==
=== First leg ===
2005 Copa Sudamericana finals
6 December 2005
19.15 (UTC-6)
First leg

Pumas UNAM (Mexico)	1–1	(Argentina) Boca Juniors
Botero 53'		Palacio 30'

Estadio Olímpico Universitario, Mexico City
Referee: Jorge Larrionda (Uruguay)

**UNAM**	**Boca Juniors**

GK	12	(Mexico) Sergio Bernal
DF	3	(Mexico) Joaquín Beltrán (c)
DF	4	(Paraguay) Darío Verón	(yellow card) 49'
DF	5	(Mexico) Israel Castro	(yellow card) 58'
DF	23	(Mexico) Marco Antonio Palacios
MF	6	(Mexico) Gonzalo Pineda	(yellow card) 86'
MF	16	(Mexico) Gerardo Galindo
MF	7	(Mexico) Leandro Augusto
MF	10	(Brazil) José Aílton da Silva	(substituted off) 45'
FW	9	(Argentina) Bruno Marioni
FW	8	(Mexico) Antonio de Nigris	(substituted off) 45'
Substitutes:
FW	20	(Mexico) Ismael Íñiguez (substituted on) 45'
FW	15	(Bolivia) Joaquín Botero (substituted on) 45'
Manager:
(Mexico) Miguel España

GK	1	(Argentina) Roberto Abbondanzieri (c)
DF	3	(Argentina) Juan Krupoviesa
DF	2	(Argentina) Rolando Schiavi	(yellow card) 58'
DF	6	(Argentina) Daniel Díaz
DF	4	(Argentina) Hugo Ibarra	(yellow card) 83'
MF	21	(Argentina) Pablo Ledesma
MF	5	(Argentina) Fernando Gago	(yellow card) 82'
MF	10	(Argentina) Federico Insúa	(substituted off) 86'
MF	23	(Argentina) Daniel Bilos	(substituted off) 75'
FW	9	(Argentina) Martín Palermo	(substituted off) 85'
FW	14	(Argentina) Rodrigo Palacio
Substitutes:
MF	19	(Argentina) Neri Cardozo	(substituted on) 75'
FW	16	(Argentina) Marcelo Delgado	(substituted on) 85'
DF	22	(Argentina) Matías Silvestre	(substituted on) 86'
Manager:
(Argentina) Alfio Basile

Man of the Match:
(Argentina) Rodrigo Palacio

Assistant referees:
(Uruguay) Pablo Fandiño
(Uruguay) Wálter Rial
Fourth official:
(Uruguay) Roberto Silvera

=== Second leg ===
18 December 2005
21:45 (UTC-3)
Second leg

Boca Juniors (Argentina)	1–1	(Mexico) Pumas UNAM
Palermo 31'		Marioni 54' (pen.)
Penalties
Barros Schelotto (penalty missed); Insúa (penalty scored); Palermo (penalty missed); Schiavi (penalty scored); Delgado (penalty scored); Abbondanzieri (penalty scored)	4–3	(penalty missed) Leandro Augusto; (penalty scored) Pineda; (penalty missed) Beltrán; (penalty scored) Cardetti; (penalty scored) Marioni; (penalty missed) Galindo

La Bombonera, Buenos Aires
Referee: Carlos Amarilla (Paraguay)

**Boca Juniors**	**UNAM**

GK	1	(Argentina) Roberto Abbondanzieri	(yellow card) 61'
DF	4	(Argentina) Hugo Ibarra	(yellow card) 32'
DF	2	(Argentina) Rolando Schiavi
DF	6	(Argentina) Daniel Díaz
DF	3	(Argentina) Juan Krupoviesa
MF	8	(Argentina) Sebastián Battaglia (c)
MF	5	(Argentina) Fernando Gago	(substituted off) 70'
MF	23	(Argentina) Daniel Bilos	(substituted off) 84'
MF	10	(Argentina) Federico Insúa
FW	9	(Argentina) Martín Palermo	(yellow card) 87'
FW	14	(Argentina) Rodrigo Palacio	(yellow card) 65'	(substituted off) 86'
Substitutes:
MF	21	(Argentina) Pablo Ledesma	(substituted on) 70'
FW	7	(Argentina) Guillermo Barros Schelotto	(substituted on) 84'
FW	16	(Argentina) Marcelo Delgado	(substituted on) 86'
Manager:
(Argentina) Alfio Basile

GK	12	(Mexico) Sergio Bernal
DF	23	(Mexico) Marco Antonio Palacios
DF	3	(Mexico) Joaquín Beltrán (c)
DF	4	(Paraguay) Darío Verón
DF	5	(Mexico) Israel Castro
MF	16	(Mexico) Gerardo Galindo	(yellow card) 79'
MF	6	(Mexico) Gonzalo Pineda
MF	15	(Bolivia) Joaquín Botero	(substituted off) 78'
MF	7	(Mexico) Leandro Augusto
FW	10	(Brazil) José Aílton da Silva	(yellow card) 45+1'	(substituted off) 46'
FW	9	(Argentina) Bruno Marioni	(yellow card) 50'
Substitutes:
FW	20	(Mexico) Ismael Íñiguez	(substituted on) 46'
FW	22	(Argentina) Martín Cardetti	(substituted on) 78'
Manager:
(Mexico) Miguel España

Man of the Match:
(Argentina) Roberto Abbondanzieri

Assistant referees:
(Paraguay) Manuel Bernal
(Paraguay) Amelio Andino
Fourth official:
(Paraguay) Ricardo Grance
