= Primera División de México Clausura 2009 Liguilla Final =

- Event: Primera División de México Clausura 2009 Liguilla
UNAM	Pachuca
(Mexico)	(Mexico)
3	2
- On aggregate

First leg
UNAM	Pachuca
1	0
- Date: 28 May 2009
- Venue: Estadio Olímpico Universitario, Mexico City
- Referee: Francisco Chacón Gutiérrez (Mexico)
- Attendance: 62,000

Second leg
Pachuca	UNAM
2	2
- (a.e.t.)
- Date: 31 May 2009
- Venue: Estadio Hidalgo, Pachuca
- Referee: Paul Enrique Delgadillo Haro (Mexico)
- Attendance: 30,000

The Clausura 2009 Liguilla Final was a two-legged football match-up to determine the Clausura 2009 champions. The final was contested by Pumas UNAM (mostly known for the acronym "UNAM") and Pachuca. The first leg was held in Estadio Olímpico Universitario in Mexico City and was won by UNAM 1–0. The second leg was held in Estadio Hidalgo of Pachuca where both teams tied 2–2 after extra time.

UNAM won the series 3–2 on aggregate, therefore the club crowned champion of the season, achieving their sixth Mexican Primera División title.

== Rules ==
Like other match-ups in the knockout round, the teams will play two games, one at each team's home stadium. As the highest seeded team determined at the beginning of the Liguilla, Pachuca was to have home-field advantage for the second leg. If the teams remained tied after 90 minutes of play during the 2nd leg, extra time will be used, followed by a penalty shootout if necessary.

== Venues ==
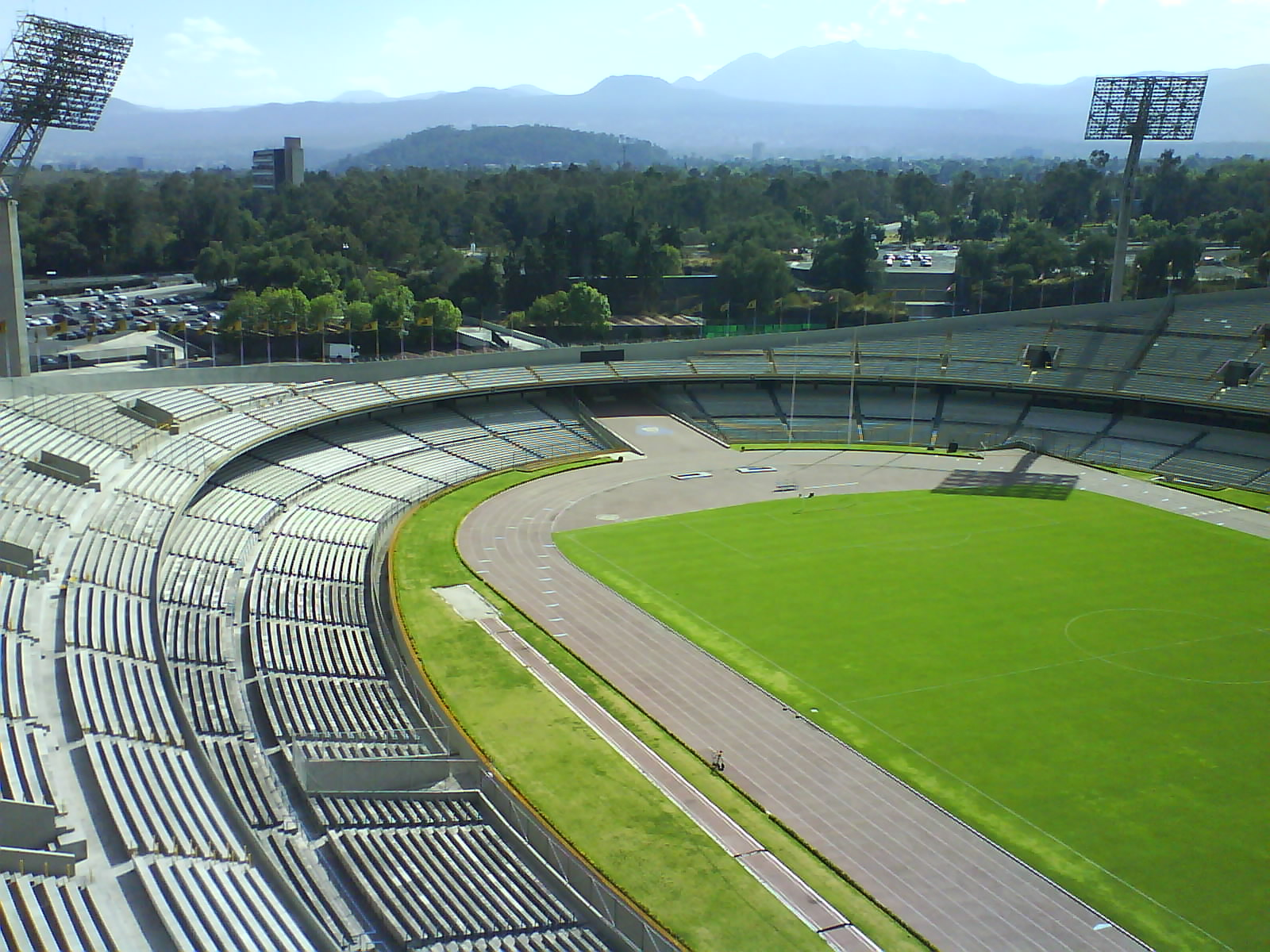
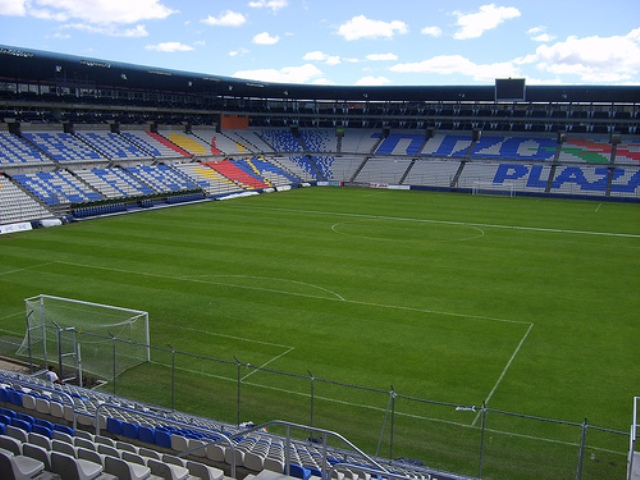
Estadio Olímpico Universitario (left) and Estadio Hidalgo, venues for the series.

== Match summary ==
28 May 2009
21:05

UNAM	1–0	Pachuca
López 21'

Estadio Olímpico Universitario, Mexico City
Attendance: 62,000
Referee: Francisco Chacón (Guanajuato)

UNAM	Pachuca

GK	125	(Mexico) Sergio Bernal (c)
DF	4	(Paraguay) Darío Verón
DF	3	(Mexico) Marco Antonio Palacios
DF	6	(Mexico) Efraín Juárez
DF	2	(Mexico) Efraín Velarde
MF	5	(Mexico) Efraín Velarde
MF	13	(Mexico) Jehu Chiapas
MF	26	(Mexico) David Toledo	(yellow card) 30'	(substituted off) 72'
FW	17	(Mexico) Francisco Palencia		(substituted off) 84'
FW	20	(Mexico) Ismael Íñiguez		(substituted off) 88'
FW	9	(Paraguay) Dante López
Substitutes:
GK	1	(Mexico) Odin Patiño
DF	15	(Mexico) Carlos Humberto González
MF	16	(Mexico) Fernando Espinoza
MF	7	(Mexico) Leandro Augusto		(substituted in) 72'
FW	8	(Mexico) Pablo Barrera		(substituted in) 88'
FW	11	(Mexico) Juan Carlos Cacho
FW	10	(Argentina) Martín Bravo		(substituted in) 84'
Manager:
(Brazil) Ricardo Ferretti

GK	1	(Colombia) Miguel Calero (c)
DF	26	(Argentina) Javier Muñoz
DF	4	(Mexico) Marco Iván Pérez
DF	16	(Mexico) Carlos Gerardo Rodríguez
DF	22	(Mexico) Paul Aguilar	(yellow card) 82'
MF	6	(Mexico) Jaime Correa
MF	11	(Mexico) José María Cárdenas		(substituted off) 46'
MF	18	(United States) José Francisco Torres
MF	19	(Argentina) Christian Giménez
MF	7	(Argentina) Damián Ariel Álvarez		(substituted off) 76'
FW	9	(Mexico) Ulises Mendivil		(substituted off) 59'
Substitutes:
GK	23	(Mexico) Carlos Velázquez
MF	12	(Mexico) Juan Carlos Rojas		(substituted in) 76'
MF	8	(Mexico) Gabriel Caballero
MF	24	(Mexico) Raúl Martínez
MF	15	(Mexico) Luis Montes		(substituted in) 46'
FW	10	(Paraguay) Edgar Benítez		(substituted in) 59'
FW	21	(Panama) Blas Pérez
Manager:
(Mexico) Enrique Meza Enríquez

Assistant referees:
(Mexico) Alberto Morín Méndez
(Mexico) Alejandro Ayala Valderrama
Fourth official:
(Mexico) Armando Archundia Téllez

31 May 2009
19:05

Pachuca	2–2 (a.e.t.)	UNAM
Giménez 32' (pen.), 78'		López 62'; Barrera 108'

Estadio Hidalgo, Pachuca
Attendance: 30,000
Referee: Paul Delgadillo (Jalisco)

Pachuca	UNAM

GK	1	(Colombia) Miguel Calero (c)
DF	26	(Argentina) Javier Muñoz	(red card) 89'
DF	4	(Mexico) Marco Iván Pérez
DF	16	(Mexico) Carlos Gerardo Rodríguez
DF	22	(Mexico) Paul Aguilar	(yellow card) 72'
DF	15	(Mexico) Luis Montes	(yellow card) 13'	(substituted off) 60'
MF	6	(Mexico) Jaime Correa
MF	8	(Mexico) Gabriel Caballero	(yellow card) 28'	(substituted off) 72'
MF	19	(Argentina) Christian Giménez
MF	7	(Argentina) Damián Ariel Álvarez	(yellow card) 65'
FW	21	(Panama) Blas Pérez		(substituted off) 97'
Substitutes:
GK	30	(Mexico) Rodolfo Cota
MF	12	(Mexico) Juan Carlos Rojas		(substituted in) 97'
MF	27	(Mexico) Edy Germán Brambila
MF	18	(United States) José Francisco Torres		(substituted in) 72'
MF	11	(Mexico) José María Cárdenas		(substituted in) 30'
FW	10	(Paraguay) Edgar Benítez
FW	9	(Mexico) Ulises Mendivil
Manager:

GK	125	(Mexico) Sergio Bernal (c)
DF	3	(Mexico) Marco Antonio Palacios	(yellow card) 129'
DF	4	(Paraguay) Darío Verón
DF	6	(Mexico) Efraín Juárez
DF	2	(Mexico) Efraín Velarde
MF	13	(Mexico) Jehu Chiapas	(yellow card) 47'	(substituted off) 95'
MF	5	(Mexico) Efraín Velarde
MF	26	(Mexico) David Toledo
FW	17	(Mexico) Francisco Palencia		(substituted off) 84'
FW	20	(Mexico) Ismael Íñiguez		(substituted off) 53'
FW	9	(Paraguay) Dante López
Substitutes:
GK	1	(Mexico) Odin Patiño
DF	15	(Mexico) Carlos H. González
MF	16	(Mexico) Fernando Espinoza
MF	7	(Mexico) Leandro Augusto	(yellow card) 113'	(substituted in) 53'
FW	8	(Mexico) Pablo Barrera		(substituted in) 95'
FW	11	(Mexico) Juan Carlos Cacho
FW	10	(Argentina) Martín Bravo		(substituted in) 84'
Manager:
(Brazil) Ricardo Ferretti

(Mexico) Alejandro Cruz Ríos
(Mexico) Pedro Rebollar León
Fourth official:
(Mexico) José Alfredo Peñaloza Soto
