= Darío Verón =

Paraguayan-Mexican footballer (born 1979)

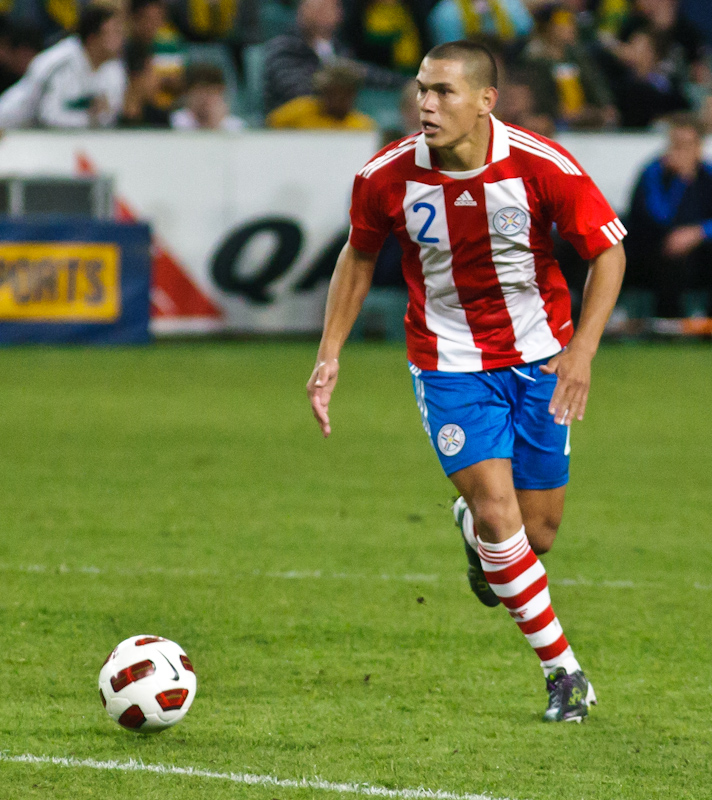

Personal information
- Full name: Darío Anastacio Verón Maldonado
- Date of birth: 26 July 1979 (age 47)
- Place of birth: San Ignacio, Paraguay
- Height: 1.80 m (5 ft 11 in)
- Position: Centre-back

Senior career*
Years	Team	Apps	(Gls)
1999–2003	12 de Octubre		
2001	→ Guaraní (loan)		
2003	Cobreloa	20	(4)
2003–2017	UNAM	451	(22)
2017–2019	Olimpia	37	(1)

International career^{‡}
2001–2017	Paraguay	53	(1)
Medal record
Representing Paraguay
Copa América
Runner-up	2011 Argentina	Team
- * Club domestic league appearances and goals as of 24 October 2017 ‡ National team caps and goals as of 11 September 2012

Darío Anastacio Verón Maldonado (born 26 July 1979) is a Paraguayan former professional footballer who played as a centre-back. He also holds Mexican citizenship.

Verón spent the majority of his playing career with Universidad Nacional, where he holds the record for most appearances.

== Career ==
Verón joined Pumas in 2003, on a transfer from the Chilean club Cobreloa. Verón previously played for Club Guaraní and Club 12 de Octubre, clubs from his native country. A commanding central defender, Verón has also scored more than a dozen goals for UNAM because of his strength in the air. His nickname is "Hechicero" (The Wizard), a play on Juan Sebastián Verón's "Brujita" (Little Witch). He has become the most experienced defensive player in the Pumas lineup after Joaquín Beltrán moved to Necaxa and Sergio Bernal announced his retirement.

He has also earned some 50 caps for Paraguay, including the Copa América tournaments of 2001, 2007, and 2011, and the 2010 FIFA World Cup. Verón was a key part of the rigid defense that carried Paraguay to the final of the 2011 Copa América in Argentina, where he formed a sturdy central core alongside Paulo Da Silva. On occasion, he has also featured for Paraguay at right fullback.

== Controversy ==
Verón has been accused of making racist insults by Felipe Baloy, Darwin Quintero and Michael Arroyo.

== Career statistics ==
=== International ===
Appearances and goals by national team and year
National team	Year	Apps	Goals
Paraguay	2001	1	0
Paraguay	2002	–	
Paraguay	2003	–	
Paraguay	2004	–	
Paraguay	2005	–	
Paraguay	2006	–	
Paraguay	2007	10	0
Paraguay	2008	7	0
Paraguay	2009	9	0
Paraguay	2010	6	0
Paraguay	2011	16	1
Paraguay	2012	2	0
Paraguay	2013	–	
Paraguay	2014	–	
Paraguay	2015	–	
Paraguay	2016	–	
Paraguay	2017	2	0
Total		53	1

Scores and results list Paraguay's goal tally first, score column indicates score after each Verón goal.

List of international goals scored by Darío Verón
No.	Date	Venue	Opponent	Score	Result	Competition
1	11 November 2011	Estadio Defensores del Chaco, Asunción, Paraguay	Ecuador	2–0	2–1	2014 FIFA World Cup qualification

== Honours ==
=== Club ===
Cobreloa

- Primera División de Chile (1): 2003 Apertura

Pumas UNAM

- Mexican Primera División (4): 2004 Clausura, 2004 Apertura, 2009 Clausura, 2011 Clausura
- Trofeo Santiago Bernabéu: (1) 2004
- Campeón de Campeones (1): 2004

Olimpia

- Paraguayan Primera División (3): 2018 Clausura, 2018 Apertura, 2019 Apertura

=== Individual ===
- Best Centre Back of the tournament: 2011 Clausura
