= Alejandro Palacios =

Mexican footballer (born 1981)

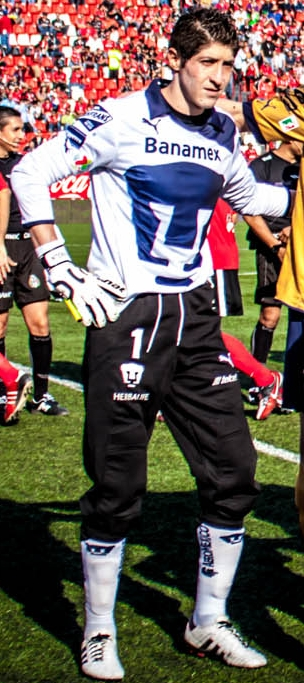
- Palacios with UNAM

Personal information
- Full name: Miguel Alejandro Palacios Redorta
- Date of birth: March 6, 1981 (age 45)
- Place of birth: Mexico City, Mexico
- Height: 1.88 m (6 ft 2 in)

Team information
- Current team: Mexico U20 (women) (Goalkeeping coach)

Senior career*
Years	Team	Apps	(Gls)
2003–2017	UNAM	206	(0)
2017–2018	Atlético San Luis	27	(0)
Total		233	(0)

Managerial career
- 2024–: Mexico U20 (women) (Goalkeeping coach)
- * Club domestic league appearances and goals

Miguel Alejandro Palacios Redorta (born 6 March 1981), commonly known as “Pikolin” is a Mexican former professional footballer who played as a goalkeeper most recently for Atlético San Luis in the Ascenso MX.

== Career ==
=== Pumas UNAM ===
He joined UNAM at the age of 16, and was administered to Puma's youth sub-17 squad, as well as his twin brother Marco Antonio Palacios, a defender. Alejandro Palacios made his first division debut on May 17, 2003. Typically, Palacios has acted as back-up to veteran goalkeeper Sergio Bernal.

In August 2010 he saved a penalty in a 2–0 win against Cruz Azul.

== International career ==
In February 2016, Palacios was called up by Mexico manager Juan Carlos Osorio for a friendly-international match against Senegal. Palacios was named in Mexico's provisional squad for Copa América Centenario but was cut from the final squad.

== Honours ==
UNAM

- Mexican Primera División (4): 2004 Clausura, 2004 Apertura, 2009 Clausura, 2011 Clausura
- Campeón de Campeones (1): 2004

== See also ==
- List of one-club men
