= Gonzalo Pineda =

Mexican footballer and coach (born 1982)

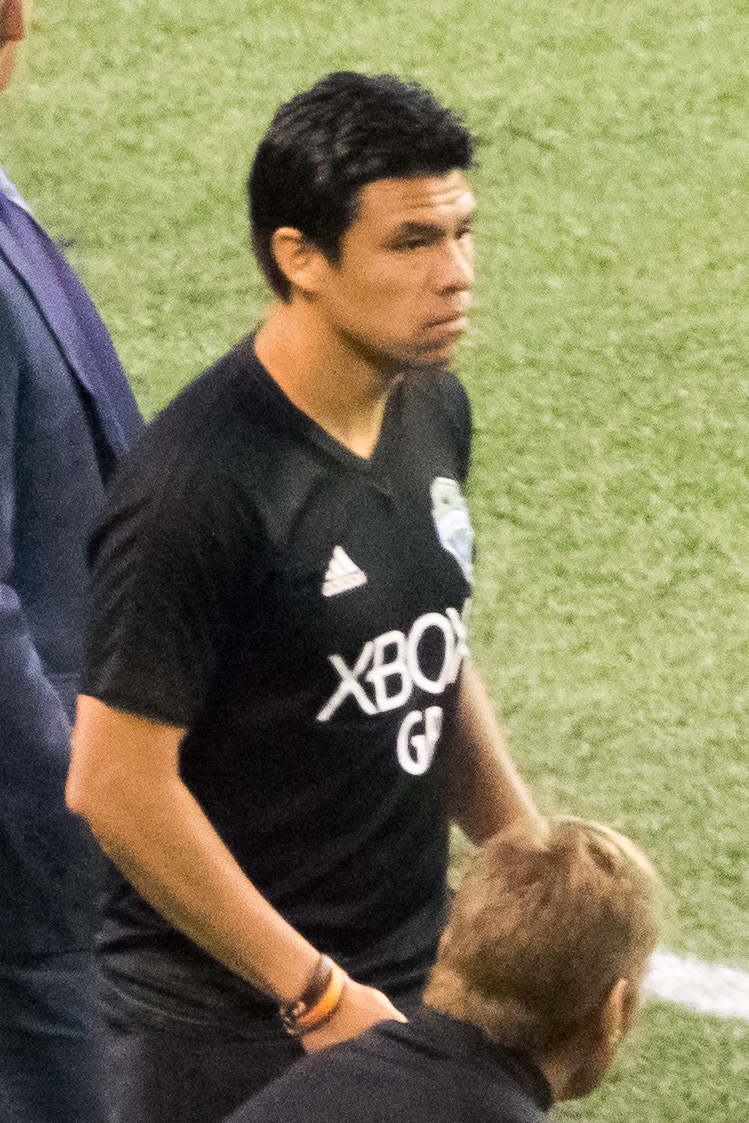
- Pineda in 2017

Personal information
- Full name: Gonzalo Pineda Reyes
- Date of birth: October 19, 1982 (age 44)
- Place of birth: Pátzcuaro, Michoacán, Mexico
- Height: 1.77 m (5 ft 9 1/2 in)
- Position: Defensive midfielder

Senior career*
Years	Team	Apps	(Gls)
2003–2005	Pumas	63	(1)
2006–2009	Guadalajara	128	(5)
2010	→ San Luis (loan)	14	(1)
2010–2011	Cruz Azul	35	(1)
2011–2012	Puebla	31	(1)
2012–2013	Querétaro	27	(1)
2014–2015	Seattle Sounders	56	(4)
Total		354	(14)

International career
2004	Mexico U23	2	(0)
2004–2008	Mexico	45	(1)

Managerial career
- 2017–2021: Seattle Sounders (assistant)
- 2021–2024: Atlanta United
- 2025: Atlas
Medal record
Representing Mexico
Third place	Copa America	2007
- * Club domestic league appearances and goals

Gonzalo Pineda Reyes (born October 19, 1982) is a Mexican professional football manager and former player. Pineda played as a defensive midfielder for several clubs in Mexico, and also represented Mexico internationally. He last played in 2015 for the Seattle Sounders FC. He became assistant coach of the Sounders beginning with the 2017 season.

== Club playing career ==
Pineda made his professional debut in the Mexican Primera División in 2002–2003 season playing for Pumas in a 0–1 defeat against Morelia. Gonzalo is known as an excellent marker and for his powerful left foot. He helped Pumas to the Clausura and Apertura titles in 2004.

In the 2005–2006 Season, Pineda was transferred to Chivas de Guadalajara. Pineda was a notable starter in his first season with Chivas. However, in Apertura 2006 he had a difficult season, starting as a substitute for Juan Pablo Rodríguez and rumors rose that he might walk out of Chivas after the season since he wasn't playing. He was quoted by the press saying that he had not enough level to be playing for Chivas. Eventually, after bad performances by Rodriguez, Pineda made it to the starting lineup again and proved that he was worthy of the starting team. He played well the remainder of the games and eventually became champion for the third time in his career. Gonzalo's solid skills in the midfield and his consistent performances had earned him an indisputable spot with Chivas.

After the Clausura 2008, Chivas put Pineda in their summer transfer list. As of June 17, 2008 Pineda was due to play the Apertura 2008 with Atlante F.C.; however, he made it clear that he would not leave Chivas and remained with the team. Gonzalo was sent on a 6-month loan with San Luis for the Torneo Bicentenario in 2010. In his debut for San Luis he got a red card in the 39th minute and was suspended for three games.

On May 24, 2010, the press revealed that Pineda would play for Cruz Azul in The Centenario 2010 Tournament, which was confirmed by Sport Director Alberto Quintano. In one season at the club, Pineda made 35 appearances and scored one goal. Pineda played two seasons with Puebla on loan in 2011 and in 2012, then went on loan to Queretaro F.C. In 2013, after his loan deal expired, he went into free agency after not finding a new club.

Following his release, Pineda joined Seattle Sounders FC of Major League Soccer on a preseason trial. He signed with the club on March 5, 2014.

On January 7, 2016, Pineda announced his retirement from playing football.

== International playing career ==
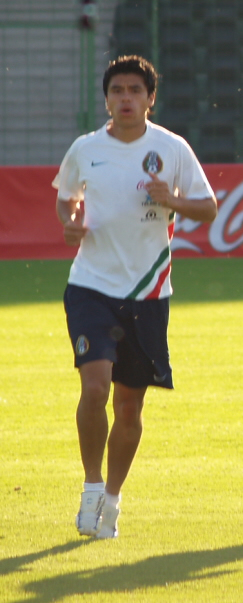

Gonzalo Pineda was part of Mexico's Olympic football team, which exited in the first round, having finished third in group A, below group winners Mali and South Korea.

Pineda made his international debut for the senior Mexico national team against Trinidad & Tobago on September 8, 2004, in Mexico's qualification matches for the 2006 FIFA World Cup.

He played mainly as a substitute in ten of Mexico's qualification matches for the 2006 World Cup and played five games in the 2005 FIFA Confederations Cup in Germany, where he converted a Panenka-style penalty kick against Argentina. In June 2006, he was selected by coach Ricardo Lavolpe, to be part of the 23 man Mexican squad to play in the 2006 FIFA World Cup Tournament in Germany. He started in Mexico's first three World Cup games.

Pineda was once again called to the Mexico national team during Hugo Sánchez's tenure as coach. He played for Mexico in Copa América 2007.

=== International goals ===
Goal	Date	Venue	Opponent	Score	Result	Competition
1.	July 17, 2005	Reliant Stadium, Houston, United States	Colombia	1–1	1–2	2005 CONCACAF Gold Cup

== Media and coaching career ==
After announcing his retirement from football and his intention of becoming a coach, Pineda joined Univision, working as a soccer analyst for the American Spanish-language national broadcast network.

On January 20, 2017, Pineda rejoined Seattle Sounders FC as an assistant coach on Brian Schmetzer's staff. He signed a contract extension with the club in March 2021, following an off-season interview with D.C. United for their head coach vacancy.

=== Atlanta United ===
On August 12, 2021, Pineda was appointed head coach at Major League Soccer club Atlanta United FC. On June 3, 2024, Pineda was dismissed from his position.

=== Atlas ===
On December 12, 2024, Pineda was appointed manager at Liga MX club Atlas F.C. Being his first job as a coach in Mexico. On August 10, 2025, Pineda stepped down from his position following a series of poor results.

== Personal life ==
Pineda earned his U.S. green card in June 2015. This status also qualified him as a domestic player for MLS roster purposes. Since his family had achieved US citizenship, Pineda felt it was in their best interest to stay in this country and not return to Mexico after retirement. Pineda lives in the Atlanta-area with his wife, Reyna, and their two children.

== Managerial statistics ==
As of match played 10 August 2025

Managerial record by team and tenure
Team	Nat	From	To	Record								Ref
Team	Nat	From	To	G	W	D	L	GF	GA	GD	Win %	Ref
Atlanta United FC	(United States)	12 August 2021	3 June 2024	110	38	31	41	178	163	+15	34.55	
Atlas	(Mexico)	12 December 2024	10 August 2025	24	5	7	12	35	52	−17	20.83	
Total				134	43	38	53	213	215	−2	32.09	

== Honours ==
Pumas

- Mexican Primera División: Clausura 2004, Apertura 2004
- Campeón de Campeones: 2004

Guadalajara

- Mexican Primera División: Apertura 2006
- InterLiga: 2009

Seattle Sounders FC

- U.S. Open Cup: 2014
- MLS Supporters' Shield: 2014

Mexico U23

- CONCACAF Olympic Qualifying Championship: 2004
