= Daniel Bilos =

Argentine footballer (born 1980)

Daniel Biloš
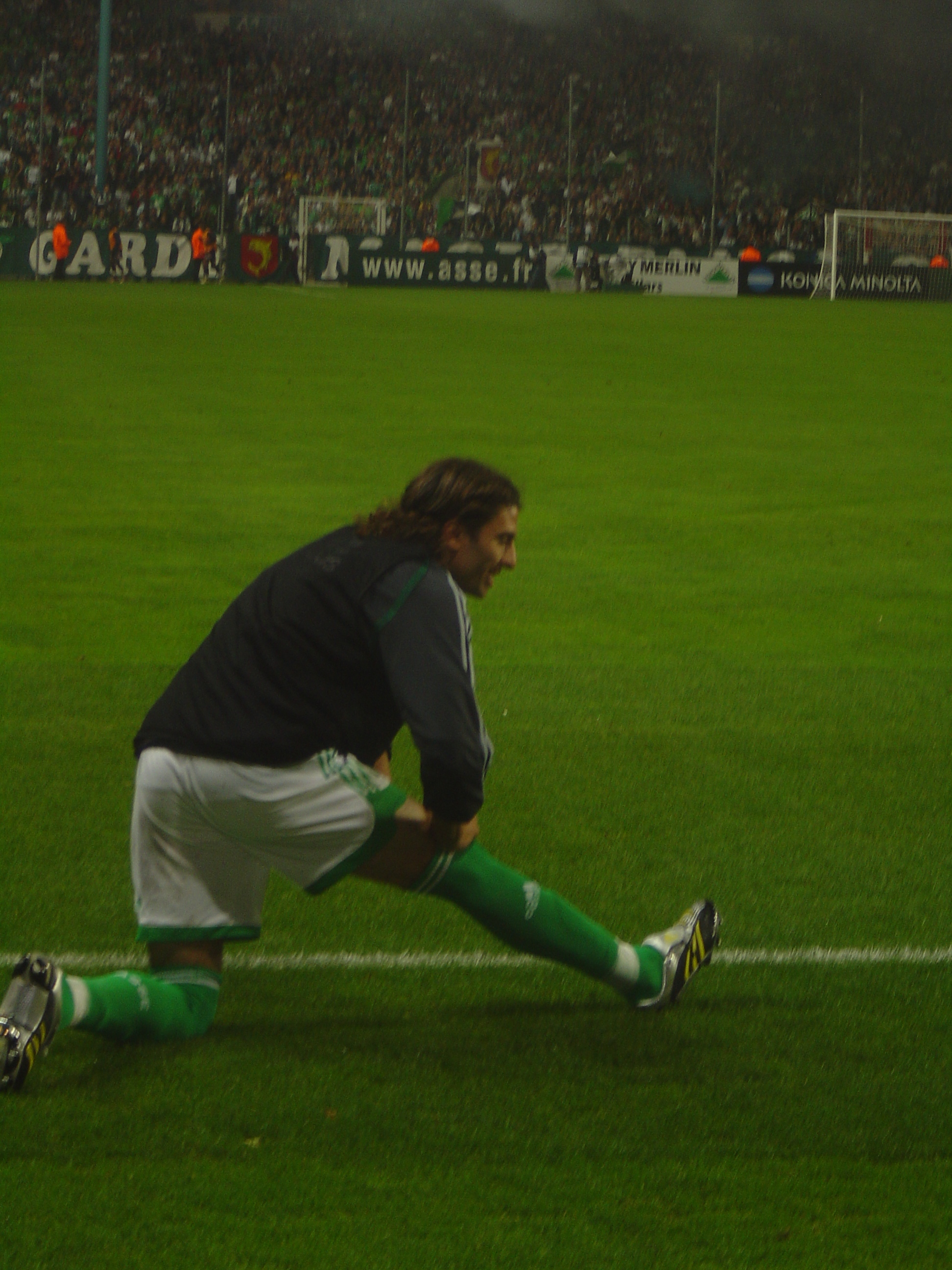
- Bilos in 2006

Personal information
- Full name: Daniel Rubén Biloš
- Date of birth: 3 September 1980 (age 46)
- Place of birth: Pergamino, Argentina
- Height: 1.94 m (6 ft 4 in)
- Positions: Left winger; second striker

Senior career*
Years	Team	Apps	(Gls)
1999–2000	Sportivo Pergamino		
2000–2005	Banfield	94	(15)
2005–2006	Boca Juniors	33	(4)
2006–2009	Saint-Étienne	14	(0)
2007	→ Club América (loan)	7	(2)
2007–2008	→ San Lorenzo (loan)	14	(1)
2009	Banfield	0	(0)
2011	Douglas Haig		

International career
2005–2006	Argentina	3	(1)
- * Club domestic league appearances and goals

Daniel Rubén Biloš (born 3 September 1980) is an Argentine former professional footballer who played for clubs in Argentina, France and Mexico. He made three appearances scoring one goal for the Argentina national team.

== Club career ==
Born in Pergamino, Buenos Aires Province, Bilos started his career at lower league team Sportivo Pergamino in 1999, but was soon picked up by Banfield. He played for them for four years, including the 2005 Copa Libertadores before making the move to Argentine club Boca Juniors in July 2005.

At Boca he won several titles including Apertura 2005, Clausura 2006 and 2005 Copa Sudamericana.

In the summer of 2006 Bilos was signed by French team AS Saint-Étienne for on a three-year contract for a fee of £1 million but after six months on Ligue 1, He was lent to Mexican club Club América on 15 January 2007, for one year, with the option to buy, although very poor play caused him to be eventually sent back. Bilos was traded to San Lorenzo, of Argentina, for the 2007 Apertura Championship. As of late November 2007, Bilos was injured and not scheduled to play competitive football until 2008. After nine years, the midfielder has returned on 4 August 2009 to Banfield, he played for San Lorenzo de Almagro last season. He was a non-playing member of the squad that won the Argentine championship for the first time in the history of the club, clinching the Apertura 2009 championship on the final day of the season.

After failing to recover from the knee injury that kept him out of the Banfield team, he decided to retire from professional football in December 2009 aged 29. However, he returned to football activity in 2011, playing for Douglas Haig.

== International career ==
Since he is of Croatian descent, in 2006 Bilos (originally Biloš) was offered the chance to play for Croatia in the World Cup Germany 06, but he declined the offer because he felt he still had a chance to play for the country of his birth.

After Argentina's quarter final defeat and the resignation of José Pekerman, Alfio Basile took over as manager of Argentina. This gave Bilos a great chance to get into the Argentina squad, with Basile being his former manager at Boca Juniors.

Bilos was given his debut in Argentina's friendly with Brazil at the Emirates Stadium in London, England. Despite Argentina's relatively poor performance and their 3–0 defeat, Basile has kept faith with Bilos and continued to pick him for subsequent Argentina squads. On 10 October 2006 he scored Argentina's only goal in their 2–1 defeat against Spain in a friendly match.

=== International goals ===
No.	Date	Venue	Opponent	Score	Result	Competition	Ref.
1	12 October 2006	Estadio Nueva Condomina, Murcia, Spain	Spain	1–1	2–1	Friendly	

== Personal life ==
Biloš is of Croatian descent.

== Honours ==
Boca Juniors

- Copa Sudamericana: 2005
- Primera División Argentina: 2005A
- Primera División Argentina: 2006C

Douglas Haig

- Torneo Argentino A: 2011–12
