= 2004 Campeón de Campeones =

Pachuca	Pumas
3	7
- on aggregate

First leg
Pachuca	Pumas
2	1
- Date: 1 August 2004
- Venue: Estadio Hidalgo, Pachuca
- Referee: Armando Archundia
- Attendance: 28,000

Second leg
Pumas	Pachuca
6	1
- Date: 8 August 2004
- Venue: Estadio Olímpico Universitario, Mexico City
- Referee: José Abramo Lira
- Attendance: 34,500

The 2004 Campeón de Campeones was the 40th edition of the Campeón de Campeones, an annual football super cup match. (Note: The edition number was calculated based on figures provided by Goal.com, with the first Campeón de Campeones having been held in 1941–42.) The match-up featured Pachuca, the winners of the Apertura 2003, and Pumas, the winners of the Clausura 2004. It was staged over two legs. The first-leg was played on 1 August 2004 at Estadio Hidalgo, Pachuca and the second-leg on 8 August 2004 at Estadio Olímpico Universitario, Mexico City.

Pumas won the series 7–3 on aggregate, claiming their second Campeón de Campeones title.

== Teams ==
Team	Qualification	Previous participations (bold indicates winners)
Pachuca	Winners of the Apertura 2003	None
Pumas	Winners of the Clausura 2004	1 (**1975**)

== Venues ==
Pachuca	Mexico City
Estadio Hidalgo	Estadio Olímpico Universitario
Capacity: **30,000**	Capacity: **69,000**

== Matches ==
=== First leg ===
1 August 2004

Pachuca	2–1	Pumas
Santana 9'; Cacho 68'	Report	Fonseca 37'

Estadio Hidalgo, Pachuca
Attendance: 28,000
Referee: Benito Archundia (State of Mexico)

=== Second leg ===
8 August 2004

Pumas	6–1	Pachuca
Lozano 23', 26'; Alonso 50'; Fonseca 51', 79'; Castro 62'	Report	Santana 87'

Estadio Olimpico Universitario, México City
Attendance: 34,000
Referee: José Abramo Lira (Nuevo León)
