= 2005 Copa Sudamericana =

2005 Copa Nissan Sudamericana de Clubes 2005 Copa Nissan Sul-americana do Clubes

Tournament details
- Dates: August 16 - December 18
- Teams: 34 (from 12 associations)

Final positions
- Champions: (Argentina) Boca Juniors (2nd title)
- Runners-up: (Mexico) Pumas UNAM

Tournament statistics
- Matches played: 66
- Goals scored: 184 (2.79 per match)
- Top scorer: (Argentina) Bruno Marioni (7)

The 2005 Copa Sudamericana, also known as the 2005 Copa Nissan Sudamericana de Clubes for sponsorship reasons, was the 4th edition of the international football cup competition played annually by clubs of CONMEBOL, and starting with this edition invited teams from CONCACAF. Boca Juniors successfully defended the Sudamericana trophy, winning the tournament for the second time.

== First stage ==
| Team 1 | Agg. | Team 2 | 1st leg | 2nd leg |
Chile/Peru Preliminary
| Universidad de Chile | 2–2 (a) | (Chile) Universidad Católica | 1–2 | 1–0 |
| Alianza Atlético (Peru) | 2–2 (4–1p) | (Peru) Universitario | 1–1 | 1–1 |
Bolivia/Ecuador Preliminary
| The Strongest (Bolivia) | 4–2 | (Bolivia) Bolívar | 2–1 | 2–1 |
| El Nacional (Ecuador) | 5–5 (a) | (Ecuador) LDU Quito | 3–4 | 2–1 |
Paraguay/Uruguay Preliminary
| Guaraní (Paraguay) | 3–3 (3–4p) | (Paraguay) Cerro Porteño | 1–2 | 2–1 |
| Defensor Sporting (Uruguay) | 5–4 | (Uruguay) Danubio | 2–3 | 3–1 |
Colombia/Venezuela Preliminary
| Deportivo Cali (Colombia) | 2–2 (6–7p) | (Colombia) Atlético Nacional | 2–0 | 0–2 |
| Trujillanos (Venezuela) | 5–2 | (Venezuela) Mineros de Guayana | 3–1 | 2–1 |

== Second stage ==
| Team 1 | Agg. | Team 2 | 1st leg | 2nd leg |
|---|---|---|---|---|
| Universidad Católica (Chile) | 5–2 | (Peru) Alianza Atlético | 5–0 | 0–2 |
| Banfield (Argentina) | 3–2 | (Argentina) Estudiantes | 2–0 | 1–2 |
| Fluminense (Brazil) | 3–3 (4–2p) | (Brazil) Santos | 2–1 | 1–2 |
| Cerro Porteño (Paraguay) | 3–1 | (Uruguay) Defensor Sporting | 2–0 | 1–1 |
| Internacional (Brazil) | 3–2 | (Brazil) São Paulo | 2–1 | 1–1 |
| Newell's Old Boys (Argentina) | 0–1 | (Argentina) Rosario Central | 0–0 | 0–1 |
| The Strongest (Bolivia) | 5–1 | (Ecuador) LDU Quito | 2–1 | 3–0 |
| Goiás (Brazil) | 1–3 | (Brazil) Corinthians | 0–2 | 1–1 |
| Juventude (Brazil) | 2–3 | (Brazil) Cruzeiro | 1–3 | 1–0 |
| Trujillanos (Venezuela) | 1–7 | (Colombia) Atlético Nacional | 1–5 | 0–2 |

== Knockout rounds ==
Round of 16
(Argentina) Vélez Sársfield | 2 | 1 | 3
(Brazil) Cruzeiro | 0 | 2 | 2
(Mexico) América | 3 | 4 | 7
(Colombia) Atlético Nacional | 3 | 1 | 4
(Brazil) Corinthians (a) | 0 | 1 | 1
(Argentina) River Plate | 0 | 1 | 1
(Mexico) Pumas UNAM | 3 | 1 | 4
(Bolivia) The Strongest | 1 | 2 | 3
(Argentina) Rosario Central | 0 | 1 | 1
(Brazil) Internacional | 1 | 1 | 2
(Paraguay) Cerro Porteño | 2 | 1 | 3
(Argentina) Boca Juniors | 2 | 5 | 7
(Brazil) Fluminense | 0 | 3 | 3
(Argentina) Banfield | 0 | 1 | 1
(United States) D.C. United | 1 | 2 | 3
(Chile) Universidad Católica | 1 | 3 | 4

Quarterfinals
(Argentina) Vélez Sársfield | 2 | 2 | 4
(Mexico) América | 0 | 0 | 0
(Brazil) Corinthians | 2 | 0 | 2
(Mexico) Pumas UNAM | 1 | 3 | 4
(Brazil) Internacional | 1 | 1 | 2
(Argentina) Boca Juniors | 0 | 4 | 4
(Brazil) Fluminense | 2 | 0 | 2
(Chile) Universidad Católica | 1 | 2 | 3

Semifinals
(Argentina) Vélez Sársfield | 0 | 0 | 0
(Mexico) Pumas UNAM | 0 | 4 | 4
(Argentina) Boca Juniors | 2 | 1 | 3
(Chile) Universidad Católica | 2 | 0 | 2

Final
(Mexico) Pumas UNAM | 1 | 1 | 2 (3)
(Argentina) Boca Juniors (p) | 1 | 1 | 2 (4)

=== Finals ===
December 6, 2005
19.15 (UTC-6)

| Pumas UNAM (Mexico) | 1–1 | (Argentina) Boca Juniors |
|---|---|---|
| Botero 53' | | Palacio 30' |

Estadio Olímpico Universitario, Mexico D.F.
Referee: Jorge Larrionda (Uruguay)

December 18, 2005
21:45 (UTC-3)

| Boca Juniors (Argentina) | 1–1 | (Mexico) Pumas UNAM |
|---|---|---|
| Palermo 31' | | Marioni 54' (pen.) |
Penalties
| Barros Schelotto (penalty missed); Insúa (penalty scored); Palermo (penalty missed); Schiavi (penalty scored); Delgado (penalty scored); Abbondanzieri (penalty scored) | 4–3 | (penalty missed) Leandro Augusto; (penalty scored) Pineda; (penalty missed) Beltrán; (penalty scored) Cardetti; (penalty scored) Marioni; (penalty missed) Galindo |

La Bombonera, Buenos Aires
Referee: Carlos Amarilla (Paraguay)
