= Esdras Rangel =

Mexican footballer (born 1977)

Personal information
- Full name: Esdras Azhael Rangel Romero
- Date of birth: 31 July 1977 (age 49)
- Place of birth: Mexico City, Mexico
- Height: 1.70 m (5 ft 7 in)
- Position: Goalkeeper

Senior career*
Years	Team	Apps	(Gls)
2001–2004	UNAM	28	(0)
2004–2005	Jaguares	0	(0)
2005–2006	Petroleros de Salamanca	22	(0)
2007	Jaguares de Tapachula	3	(0)

International career
1997	Mexico U20	0	(0)
- * Club domestic league appearances and goals

Esdras Rangel (born 31 July 1977) is a Mexican former professional football goalkeeper. He was a member of the Mexican squad for the 1997 FIFA World Youth Championship in Malaysia. but did not play in the tournament.

He last played for Jaguares de Tapachula at 2007-08 opening season. He played for Petroleros de Salamanca at 2005-06 Primera División A season.
