= Marcelo de Souza =

Uruguayan footballer (born 1975)

Personal information
- Full name: Marcelo Alejandro De Souza
- Date of birth: September 30, 1975 (age 51)
- Place of birth: Montevideo, Uruguay
- Height: 1.85 m (6 ft 1 in)
- Position: Centre back

Senior career*
Years	Team	Apps	(Gls)
1993–1995	Racing Club de Montevideo	0	(0)
1995–2001	Peñarol	107	(22)
2001	Tianjin Teda	23	(4)
2002–2003	Peñarol	50	(7)
2003–2004	Vélez Sársfield	12	(1)
2004–2005	Instituto Córdoba	10	(0)
2005	Deportivo Colonia	11	(0)
2005–2006	Danubio	17	(3)
2006	Platense	10	(2)
2006–2007	Vida	0	(0)
2007	Sanat Naft	5	(1)
2009–2011	Deportivo Maldonado	23	(0)
2011–2012	Boston River	10	(0)
2012–2013	Canadian		

International career
2004	Uruguay	2	(0)
- * Club domestic league appearances and goals as of 3 May 2016

Marcelo Alejandro De Souza (born September 30, 1975) is a Uruguayan footballer currently playing as a midfielder for Boston River in the Uruguayan Segunda División.
