= José Luis López (Mexican footballer) =

Mexican footballer (born 1979)

Personal information
- Full name: José Luis López Monroy
- Date of birth: 19 October 1979 (age 47)
- Place of birth: Mexico City, Mexico
- Height: 1.74 m (5 ft 9 in)
- Position: Midfielder

Youth career
- 1992-2000: Pumas

Senior career*
Years	Team	Apps	(Gls)
2000-2007	Pumas	210	(28)
2000	→ Puebla (loan)	4	(0)
2007–2008	Necaxa	17	(2)
2008	Cruz Azul	7	(0)
2009	Morelia	0	(0)
2009–2010	Mérida	48	(10)
2010–2011	Irapuato	35	(5)
2011–2012	UAT	36	(1)
2012–2013	Veracruz	28	(2)
2013–2015	Mérida	19	(2)
- * Club domestic league appearances and goals

José Luis López Monroy (born 19 October 1979 in Mexico City) is a Mexican former professional footballer who played as a midfielder. Nicknamed "Parejita" (Little Partner) as a diminutive of "Pareja", his father nickname.

== Career ==
Due to his father (José Luis 'Pareja' López) famous and laureated career as Pumas midfielder in 70's decade and subsequent coaching career in the team's youth system.

He frequently visited the Pumas youth premises from a very young age, until the age of 13 he formally joined the team's youth system going through all the levels of development up to the first team.

In 2000, after not having the opportunity to make his Primera División debut, he moved to Club Puebla on loan where he finally achieved his long-awaited debut. After a brief period with La Franja he returned to Pumas and made his first appearance for them on 6 January 2001 against Tecos UAG.

He played for Club Necaxa, in Aguascalientes, Mexico, as a midfielder (usually on the right flank).

Lopez has also played for Club Irapuato in the Primera A.

In February 2024, López received the Medal of Sporting Merit from the Congress of Mexico City alongside baseball players Randy Arozarena and Iván Terrazas.

== Honours ==
Pumas

- Mexican Primera División: Clausura 2004, Apertura 2004

Irapuato

- Liga de Ascenso: Clausura 2011
