= Hugo García (Mexican footballer) =

Mexican footballer and manager (born 1981)

Personal information
- Full name: Hugo García Velázquez
- Date of birth: 14 September 1981 (age 45)
- Place of birth: Mexico City
- Height: 1.73 m (5 ft 8 in)
- Position: Midfielder

Team information
- Current team: UNAM U-21 (Assistant)

Senior career*
Years	Team	Apps	(Gls)
2001–2003	Pumas UNAM	14	(0)
2004–2006	Dorados	50	(2)
2006	Veracruz	3	(0)
2004–2006	Atlante	15	(0)
2007–2011	Veracruz	84	(6)
2012	Altamira	3	(0)

Managerial career
- 2017–: UNAM Reserves
- * Club domestic league appearances and goals

Hugo García Velázquez (born September 14, 1981) is a Mexican football manager and former player. He was born in Mexico City.
