= Aílton (footballer, born 1977) =

Brazilian footballer

Personal information
- Full name: José Aílton da Silva
- Date of birth: 7 September 1977 (age 49)
- Place of birth: Alagoas, Brazil
- Height: 1.70 m (5 ft 7 in)
- Position: Attacking midfielder

Youth career
- 1995–1996: Bragantino

Senior career*
Years	Team	Apps	(Gls)
1996	Palmeiras	4	(0)
1997	Paulista	10	(2)
1998–1999	Deportivo Italchacao	32	(8)
1999–2000	Atlas	12	(1)
2000–2001	León	24	(3)
2001–2002	Bari	14	(0)
2003–2007	UNAM Pumas	105	(13)
2006	→ San Luis (loan)	16	(2)
2007	Corinthians	5	(0)
2008	Universidad Católica	14	(1)
2008	O'Higgins	10	(6)
2009	León	13	(3)
2009–2010	Veracruz	16	(1)
2011	Joseense	19	(4)
Total		294	(44)
- * Club domestic league appearances and goals

José Aílton da Silva (Portuguese pronunciation: [ʒuˈzɛ aˈiwtõ dɐ ˈsiwvɐ], born 8 September 1977), known as just Aílton, is a Brazilian former professional footballer, who operated as an attacking midfielder and also as a left midfielder or winger in the same zone. Product of the youth ranks of Bragantino, he started his professional career in 1996 with Palmeiras. He then moved to Deportivo Italia, after a brief spell at Etti Jundiaí. He is a Mexican naturalized citizen.

== Career ==
=== Early career ===
His playing career started in 1997 at Palmeiras, then in 1998 he moved to Etti Jundiaí-SP. By 1999 he was ready to move on and was signed by Venezuela's Deportivo Italia, helping them to the league title. He was then signed by Mexican club Club Atlas, subsequently being sold to Club Leon in the country's second division. His next move, a brief, unsuccessful spell with A.S. Bari in Italy was ended by Pumas.

=== UNAM Pumas ===
In his return to Mexico at Pumas his skills helped the club win the Mexican League titles and, in 2004, Santiago Bernabéu Trophy. In 2006, he helped San Luis to have their best position in the table of Clausura before his subsequent move in 2007 to Brazilian club Sport Club Corinthians Paulista.

=== Universidad Católica ===
In 2008, he joined Católica.

== Honours ==
Deportivo Italia

- Primera División Venezolana: 1999

UNAM Pumas

- Torneo de Clausura: 2004
- Torneo de Apertura: 2004
- Trofeo Santiago Bernabéu: 2004
- Copa Sudamericana runner–up: 2005
