= Francisco Fonseca =

Mexican footballer and analyst (born 1979)

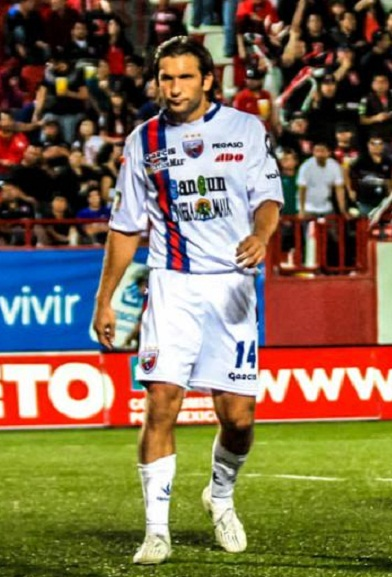
- Fonseca with Atlante in 2012

Personal information
- Full name: José Francisco Fonseca Guzmán
- Date of birth: 2 October 1979 (age 47)
- Place of birth: León, Guanajuato, Mexico
- Height: 1.82 m (6 ft 0 in)
- Position: Striker

Youth career
- 1996–1998: León
- 1998: Unión de Curtidores

Senior career*
Years	Team	Apps	(Gls)
1999	Unión de Curtidores	13	(4)
1999–2000	Atlético Yucatán	26	(8)
2000–2002	La Piedad	28	(0)
2002–2004	Pumas	80	(24)
2005–2006	Cruz Azul	48	(25)
2006	Benfica	8	(1)
2007–2010	Tigres UANL	109	(15)
2011–2013	Atlante	81	(11)
2014–2015	Santos de Guápiles	6	(0)
Total		399	(88)

International career
2004–2008	Mexico	43	(21)
Medal record
Representing Mexico
CONCACAF Gold Cup
Runner-up	CONCACAF Gold Cup	2007
- * Club domestic league appearances and goals

José Francisco "Kikin" Fonseca Guzmán (born 2 October 1979) is a Mexican former professional footballer who played as a striker. He currently works as a football analyst for Televisa Deportes Network.

== Club career ==
Born in León, Guanajuato, Fonseca made his first division debut with La Piedad in the 2001 Invierno season. After two seasons with Piedad, in which he played mostly as a substitute, Fonseca moved to Pumas, where he emerged as a star. After impressive showing in the 2003 Apertura and Clausura, he cemented his place in the Pumas starting lineup in the 2004 Clausura, during which he helped lead Pumas to a championship. After helping Pumas to a second title in the 2004 Apertura season, he was transferred to Cruz Azul, having registered 25 goals in 81 appearances for Pumas. At the beginning of 2005, Fonseca moved to Cruz Azul in one of the biggest transfers in Mexican league history. In Cruz Azul, he also was an important player playing 60 and registering 2 goals, help Cruz Azul reach the quarterfinals.

=== Benfica ===
On 27 July 2006, Fonseca signed a four-year contract with Portuguese club S.L. Benfica. Playing in only eight league games and scoring one goal (he also played in three cup games scoring two goals). His first goal at S.L. Benfica was on 21 December 2006 when he headed in a pass from Nuno Gomes against Belenenses. Kikin scored another two goals in a match of the 4th round of the Taça de Portugal between Oliveira do Bairro SC and Benfica that ended 5–0.

After a half season with Benfica, he was transferred to Mexico's UANL Tigres for the start of the Clausura 2007.

== International career ==
Fonseca was an emerging force at forward for the senior national team. On 2 April 2006, coach Ricardo Lavolpe selected him in the 23 man Mexican squad for the 2006 World Cup, in Germany. He scored his first goal in the 2006 FIFA World Cup against Portugal and won the Man Of The Match Award given by FIFA in the defeat of Mexico versus Portugal. After being selected by Hugo Sánchez for the 2007 Gold Cup, Fonseca was dropped from the squad for the 2007 Copa America due to his low performances and being shown the yellow card two consecutive games for un-called for fouls and complaints against refs. Despite an injury to star striker Jared Borgetti, Fonseca declined invitation to the 2007 Copa America. Even though he was Hugo's first choice, he took Luis Angel Landin instead. On 7 August 2008, Fonseca was called up to join Eriksson's second list of players, after an almost 1 1/2-year drought of not playing with the national team. He earned a total of 43 caps, scoring 21 goals.

== Personal life ==
Fonseca appears on the North American cover of FIFA 07 alongside Ronaldinho and Landon Donovan.

== Career statistics ==
Appearances and goals by national team and year
National team	Year	Apps	Goals
Mexico	2004	4	6
Mexico	2005	20	10
Mexico	2006	9	4
Mexico	2007	8	1
Mexico	2008	2	0
Total		43	21

Scores and results list Mexico's goal tally first, score column indicates score after each Fonseca goal.

List of international goals scored by Francisco Fonseca
No.	Date	Venue	Opponent	Score	Result	Competition
1	27 October 2004	Giants Stadium, East Rutherford, United States	Ecuador	1–0	2–1	Friendly
2	27 October 2004	Giants Stadium, East Rutherford, United States	Ecuador	2–0	2–1	Friendly
3	13 November 2004	Orange Bowl, Miami, United States	Saint Kitts and Nevis	2–0	5–0	2006 FIFA World Cup qualification
4	13 November 2004	Orange Bowl, Miami, United States	Saint Kitts and Nevis	4–0	5–0	2006 FIFA World Cup qualification
5	17 November 2004	Estadio Tecnológico, Monterrey, Mexico	Saint Kitts and Nevis	3–0	8–0	2006 FIFA World Cup qualification
6	17 November 2004	Estadio Tecnológico, Monterrey, Mexico	Saint Kitts and Nevis	6–0	8–0	2006 FIFA World Cup qualification
7	23 February 2005	Estadio Carlos González, Culiacán, Mexico	Colombia	1–0	1–1	Friendly
8	16 June 2005	AWD-Arena, Hanover, Germany	Japan	2–1	2–1	2005 FIFA Confederations Cup
9	29 June 2005	Zentralstadion, Leipzig, Germany	Germany	1–1	3–4 (a.e.t.)	2005 FIFA Confederations Cup
10	17 August 2005	Estadio Azteca, Mexico City, Mexico	Costa Rica	2–0	2–0	2006 FIFA World Cup qualification
11	7 September 2005	Estadio Azteca, Mexico City, Mexico	Panama	4–0	5–0	2006 FIFA World Cup qualification
12	8 October 2005	Estadio Alfonso Lastras, San Luis Potosí, Mexico	Guatemala	2–1	5–2	2006 FIFA World Cup qualification
13	8 October 2005	Estadio Alfonso Lastras, San Luis Potosí, Mexico	Guatemala	3–1	5–2	2006 FIFA World Cup qualification
14	8 October 2005	Estadio Alfonso Lastras, San Luis Potosí, Mexico	Guatemala	4–2	5–2	2006 FIFA World Cup qualification
15	8 October 2005	Estadio Alfonso Lastras, San Luis Potosí, Mexico	Guatemala	5–2	5–2	2006 FIFA World Cup qualification
16	14 December 2005	Chase Field, Phoenix, United States	Hungary	1–0	2–0	Friendly
17	25 January 2006	Monster Park, San Francisco, United States	Norway	1–1	2–1	Friendly
18	12 May 2006	Estadio Azteca, Mexico City, Mexico	DR Congo	1–0	2–1	Friendly
19	12 May 2006	Estadio Azteca, Mexico City, Mexico	DR Congo	2–0	2–1	Friendly
20	21 June 2006	Veltins-Arena, Gelsenkirchen, Germany	Portugal	1–2	1–2	2006 FIFA World Cup
21	2 June 2007	Estadio Alfonso Lastras, San Luis Potosí, Mexico	Iran	3–0	4–0	Friendly

== Honours ==
La Piedad

- Liga de Ascenso: Verano 2001

Pumas

- Mexican Primera División: Clausura 2004, Apertura 2004
- Campeón de Campeones: 2004

Tigres UANL

- North American SuperLiga: 2009

Individual

- Mexican Primera División Best Forward: Clausura 2006
