= Raúl Alpizar =

Mexican footballer and manager (born 1977)

Personal information
- Full name: Raúl Alpizar Aguilera
- Date of birth: 1 February 1977 (age 49)
- Place of birth: Mexico City, Mexico
- Height: 1.68 m (5 ft 6 in)
- Position: Defender

Team information
- Current team: UNAM U-18 (assistant)

Senior career*
Years	Team	Apps	(Gls)
1997–2002	UNAM		
2003–2004	Querétaro		
2004–2005	Puebla		
2005–2007	BUAP		

International career
2000	Mexico	3	(0)

Managerial career
- 2012–2015: UNAM Reserves and Academy
- 2015–2016: UNAM Premier
- 2016–2017: UNAM Reserves and Academy
- 2017–2019: UNAM (assistant)
- 2019–2020: UNAM Reserves and Academy
- 2022: Pumas Tabasco (interim)
- 2023: UNAM (interim)
- 2023–: UNAM Reserves and Academy
- 2025: UNAM (interim)
- * Club domestic league appearances and goals

Raúl Alpizar Aguilera (born 1 February 1977) is a Mexican football manager and former player.
