= Marco Antonio Palacios =

Mexican footballer (born 1981)

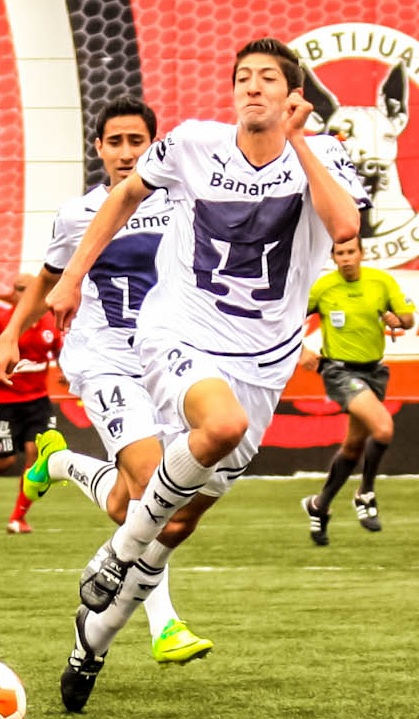
- Palacios with UNAM

Personal information
- Full name: Marco Antonio Palacios Redorta
- Date of birth: 6 March 1981 (age 45)
- Place of birth: Mexico City, Mexico
- Height: 1.83 m (6 ft 0 in)
- Position: Defender

Youth career
- 2000–2004: UNAM

Senior career*
Years	Team	Apps	(Gls)
2003–2015	UNAM	283	(7)
2007	→ Veracruz (loan)	8	(0)
2015	→ Morelia (loan)	9	(1)
Total		300	(8)

Managerial career
- 2019–2020: Inter Playa del Carmen
- 2021: Mazatlán Reserves and Academy
- 2022: Mazorqueros (Assistant)
- 2024: Guadalajara Reserves and Academy
- * Club domestic league appearances and goals

Marco Antonio Palacios Redorta (born 6 March 1981), is a Mexican former footballer who last played for Monarcas Morelia on loan from Pumas UNAM.

He made his debut with the Club Universidad Nacional under-17 Squad at the age of 16 along with his twin brother Alejandro. He made his professional debut with Club Universidad Nacional (also known as Universidad Autonoma De Mexico, or U.N.A.M.) at age 21 sporting the jersey number 23, and made it through the ranks by 2004. In 2005, he was a regular starter in the Copa Sudamericana, but he lost his starting position in the regular league games. He has acquired two honors, that of Mexican "Torneo de Clausura" (Season Closure Tournament) (2004) and of Torneo de Apertura (2004).

== Honors ==
UNAM

- Mexican Primera División: Clausura 2004, Apertura 2004, Clausura 2009, Clausura 2011
- Campeón de Campeones: 2004
