= Nhanhá =

Brazilian footballer

Personal information
- Full name: Emerson César dos Santos
- Date of birth: 29 July 1980 (age 46)
- Place of birth: Batatais, SP, Brazil
- Height: 1.76 m (5 ft 9 in)
- Position: Striker

Senior career*
Years	Team	Apps	(Gls)
2001–2003	UNAM		
2003–2004	Coatzacoalcos		
- * Club domestic league appearances and goals

Emerson César dos Santos (born 29 July 1980), known as Nhanhá, is a Brazilian football (soccer) striker.

== Career ==
Season	Club
2001–2002 Summer	UNAM
2002–2003 Opening	UNAM
2003–2004 Closing	Coatzacoalcos
