= Bruno Marioni =

Argentine footballer

Personal information
- Full name: Bruno Marioni Giménez
- Date of birth: 15 June 1975 (age 51)
- Place of birth: Paraná, Argentina
- Height: 1.77 m (5 ft 10 in)
- Position: Striker

Youth career
- 1985-1991: Patronato
- 1991-1995: Newell's Old Boys

Senior career*
Years	Team	Apps	(Gls)
1995–1997	Newell's Old Boys	49	(19)
1997-1998	Sporting CP	13	(1)
1998–2000	Estudiantes	33	(15)
1999–2000	→ Independiente (loan)	24	(13)
2000-2002	Villarreal	11	(3)
2001	→ Independiente (loan)	12	(5)
2002	→ Tenerife (loan)	13	(4)
2002-2004	Tenerife	35	(10)
2003	→ Independiente (loan)	11	(5)
2004	→ Pumas (loan)	25	(18)
2005-2006	Pumas	39	(9)
2006	Toluca	18	(11)
2007	Boca Juniors	12	(1)
2007-2009	Atlas	46	(18)
2008	→ Pachuca (loan)	8	(0)
2009	Estudiantes Tecos	14	(4)
Total		363	(136)

Managerial career
- 2017–2018: Venados
- 2019: Pumas
- 2022: Tepatitlán
- 2023: Venados
- * Club domestic league appearances and goals

Bruno Marioni Giménez (born 15 June 1975, in Paraná) is a retired Argentine striker who preferred to attack from the sides. He is currently the chairman of Liga de Expansión MX team Tepatitlán.

== Career ==
Marioni made his debut under the last name Giménez for Newell's Old Boys in 1995. In 1997, he was sold to Sporting CP in a record-breaking transfer for the Portuguese club. After a brief stint in Lisbon, he returned to Argentina to join Estudiantes who subsequently sent him on loan to Independiente (1999–2000), where he became a key goalscorer.

In 1999, his father met his paternal grandfather, Luigi Marioni, for the first time. Shortly after, both him and Bruno adopted the elderly man's last name.

In 2000, his rights were acquired by Villarreal CF. However, struggling to adapt, he was loaned once again back to Independiente (2001) and later to CD Tenerife. After helping Tenerife secure promotion, the club purchased his contract outright from Villarreal in 2002. During this period, Marioni faced a legal controversy regarding a falsified Italian passport, which led to a suspension in Spain. While still under contract with Tenerife, he completed a third loan spell with Independiente in 2003.

In early 2004, Marioni joined Pumas on a six-month loan. He had an immediate impact, he was the Clausura 2004 top scorer with 16 (+2 after in Liguilla) goals, along with fellow Argentine striker Néstor Silvera. Leading the team to the Clausura 2004 league title against Guadalajara. Due to his legal suspension (Italian passport issue) and failed initial negotiations with Tenerife, he remained inactive for the second half of 2004. In December 2004, Pumas officially purchased his rights, and he returned for a second stint with the Universitarios. At the end of 2005, Marioni was the Copa Sudamericana's top scorer with 7 goals, losing a controversial final against Boca Juniors.

He was later transferred to Toluca, where he earned his second Golden Boot in Mexico (Apertura 2006). Bringing up attention of argentine club Boca Juniors, he was signed in 2007. Where he was part of the squad that won the 2007 Copa Libertadores alongside teammate Juan Román Riquelme.

Marioni returned to Mexico in late 2007 for the Apertura 2007 after Club Atlas purchased his contract from Boca. He played the Interliga 2008 Tournament with the Rojinegros and qualified to Copa Libertadores 2008. Being team's top scorer of that edition with 7 goals, two of them scored to his previous team Boca Juniors in group stage. In 2008, he was loaned to Pachuca mainly to compete in the 2008 FIFA Club World Cup but also playing some matches in the league. After his six month loan with the Tuzos he returned to Atlas for a final season in 2009. In June 2009, Marioni agreed to join Estudiantes Tecos for a final spell in Liga MX. On 12 November 2009, Marioni held a press conference to announce his retirement from professional football.

== Honours ==
=== Club ===
Pumas

- Primera División de México: Clausura 2004

Boca Juniors

- Copa Libertadores: 2007

Individual

- Mexican Primera División top scorer (2): Clausura 2004, Apertura 2006
- Copa Sudamericana top scorer: 2005
- Interliga top scorer: 2008
