= Israel Castro =

Mexican footballer (born 1980)

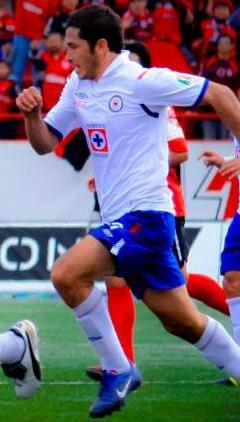
- Castro playing for Cruz Azul

Personal information
- Full name: Israel Castro Macías
- Date of birth: 20 December 1980 (age 45)
- Place of birth: Mexico City, Mexico
- Height: 1.75 m (5 ft 9 in)
- Position: Defensive midfielder

Senior career*
Years	Team	Apps	(Gls)
2002–2011	UNAM	324	(12)
2011–2013	Cruz Azul	92	(3)
2014–2016	Guadalajara	67	(1)
2016–2018	Toledo	73	(1)
Total		556	(17)

International career
2007–2012	Mexico	48	(1)
Medal record
Representing Mexico
CONCACAF Gold Cup
Winner	CONCACAF Gold Cup	2009
Winner	CONCACAF Gold Cup	2011
Third place	Copa America	2007
- * Club domestic league appearances and goals

Israel Castro Macías (born 20 December 1980) is a Mexican former professional footballer who played as a defensive midfielder.

== Club career ==
=== Pumas UNAM ===
He joined the Pumas youth system and worked his way through the ranks to debut in 2002; he was a regular starter and played a very important role in the 2004 campaign of the team, when Pumas won consecutive league championships. Fans also call him the "Asesino de galácticos" or "Galactic Assassin". Since he was the lone scorer in the game when Pumas defeated Real Madrid for the Santiago Bernabeu trophy in 2004. After becoming champion with Pumas Unam he was drafted by Cruz Azul. He left the team as a captain.

== Honours ==
UNAM

- Mexico Primera División: Clausura 2004, Apertura 2004, Clausura 2009, Clausura 2011
- Campeón de Campeones: 2004

Cruz Azul

- Copa MX: Clausura 2013

Guadalajara

- Copa MX: Apertura 2015

Mexico

- CONCACAF Gold Cup: 2009, 2011

Individual

- Primera División de México Best Defensive Midfielder :Clausura 2011

== Career statistics ==
=== International ===
National team	Year	Apps	Goals
Mexico	2007	9	0
Mexico	2008	2	0
Mexico	2009	13	1
Mexico	2010	8	0
Mexico	2011	15	0
Mexico	2012	1	0
Total		48	1

=== International goals ===
Scores and results list Mexico's goal tally first.

Goal	Date	Venue	Opponent	Score	Result	Competition
1.	12 August 2009	Estadio Azteca, Mexico City, Mexico	United States	1–1	2–1	2010 FIFA World Cup qualification
