= Odín Patiño =

Mexican footballer (born 1983)

Personal information
- Full name: Víctor Odín Patiño Bermúdez
- Date of birth: August 24, 1983 (age 43)
- Place of birth: Mexico City, Mexico
- Height: 1.83 m (6 ft 0 in)
- Position: Goalkeeper

Team information
- Current team: UNAM U-21 (goalkeeper coach)

Senior career*
Years	Team	Apps	(Gls)
2002–2012	UNAM	18	(0)
2010	→ Club León (loan)	12	(0)
2012–2013	Pumas Morelos	16	(0)
2014–2017	Venados	26	(0)

Managerial career
- 2025–: UNAM Reserves and Academy
- * Club domestic league appearances and goals as of 22 August 2017

Víctor Odín Patiño Bermúdez (born 24 August 1983) is a former Mexican football player.

His current position is goalkeeper for UNAM Pumas. He joined the Pumas youth system and ever since he has worked his way through the ranks to join the senior team. He was a member of the U-20 Selección de fútbol de México (Mexico national team). He has played on Pumas Morelos.

== Individual honours ==
- Mexican Primera División: (3)

Pumas UNAM

- (Mexico) Clausura 2009
- (Mexico) Clausura 2004
- (Mexico) Apertura 2004
- Champion of Champions: (1) 2004
- Santiago Bernabeu Cup: (1) 2004
