= Leandro Augusto =

Mexican footballer (born 1977)

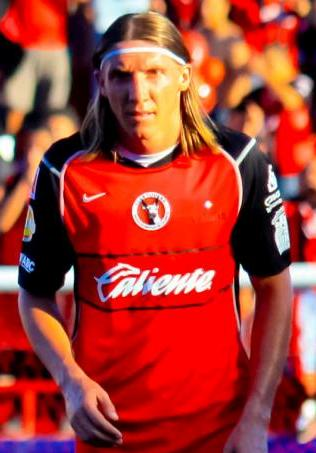
- Augusto playing for Tijuana

Personal information
- Full name: Leandro Augusto Oldoni Stachelski
- Date of birth: 18 August 1977 (age 49)
- Place of birth: Cascavel, Brazil
- Height: 1.77 m (5 ft 9 1/2 in)

Senior career*
Years	Team	Apps	(Gls)
1995–1998	Criciúma	21	(0)
1999	Internacional	6	(0)
1999–2000	Botafogo	18	(1)
2000–2001	León	34	(5)
2001–2011	UNAM	347	(17)
2011–2012	Tijuana	43	(0)
2013	→ Puebla (loan)	7	(0)
2014	UNAM	16	(0)
Total		492	(23)

International career
2008–2009	Mexico	6	(1)

Managerial career
- 2014–2018: UNAM (Assistant)
- * Club domestic league appearances and goals

Leandro Augusto Oldoni Stachelski (born 18 August 1977), known simply as Leandro Augusto, is a former professional footballer. Born in Brazil, he played for the Mexico national team.

== Coaching and management ==
Augusto retired at the end of 2014, but already from May 2014, he became a part of the first team staff, working as an assistant manager which he did until the summer 2018. He was then appointed as sporting director. He left the position on 3 May 2019.

== Career statistics ==
=== International ===
Appearances and goals by national team and year
National team	Year	Apps	Goals
Mexico	2008	1	0
Mexico	2009	5	1
Total		6	1

Scores and results list Mexico's goal tally first, score column indicates score after each Augusto goal.

List of international goals scored by Leandro Augusto
No.	Date	Venue	Opponent	Score	Result	Competition
1	11 March 2009	Dick's Sporting Goods Park, Commerce City, United States	Bolivia	2–0	5–1	Friendly

== Honours ==
UNAM

- Mexican Primera División: Clausura 2004, Apertura 2004, Clausura 2009, Clausura 2011
- Trofeo Santiago Bernabéu: 2004

Tijuana

- Liga MX: Apertura 2012

Individual

- Mexican Primera División Best Defensive Midfielder: Apertura 2007
