= Santiago Bernabéu Trophy =

Santiago Bernabéu Trophy Trofeo Santiago Bernabéu
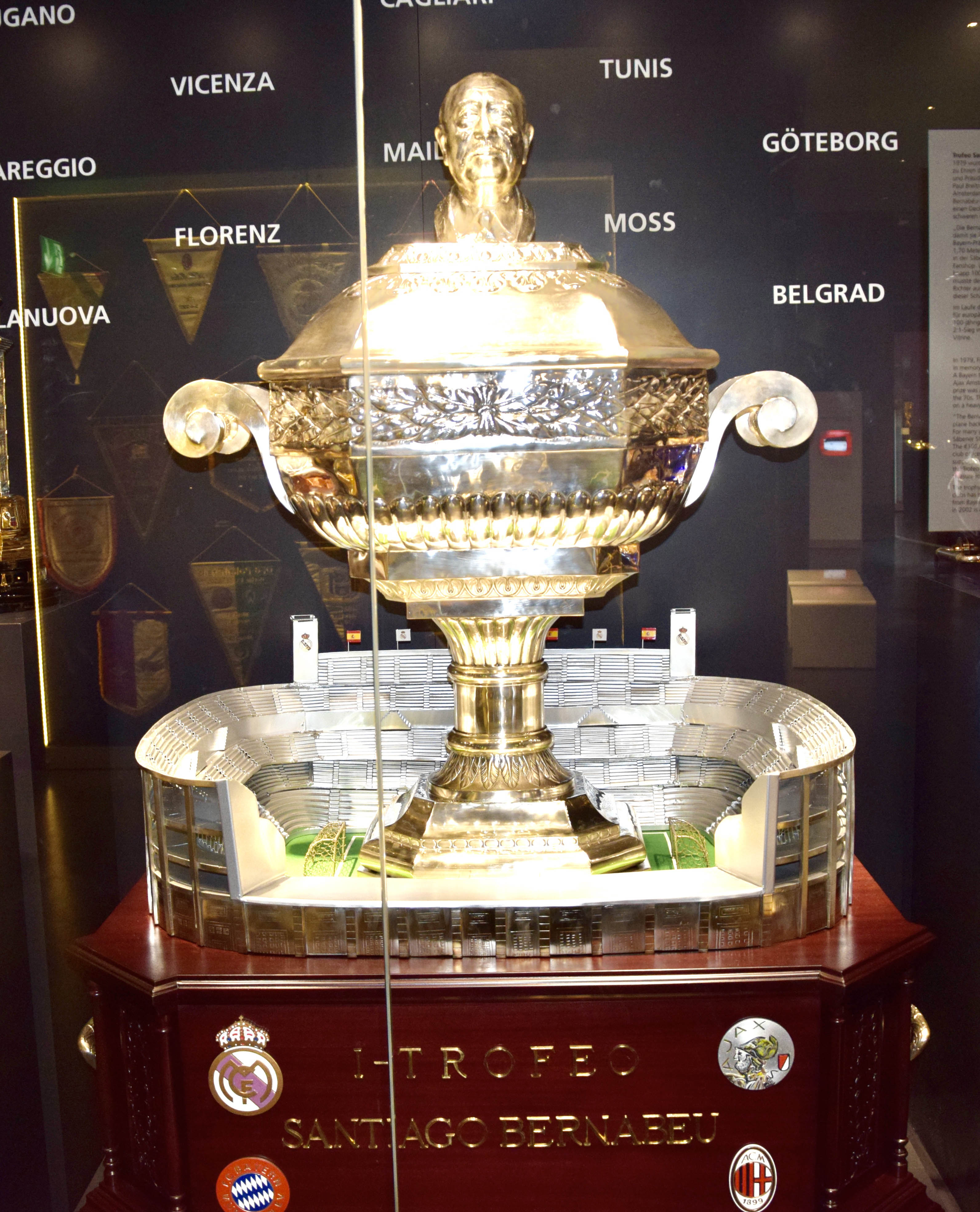
- The trophy exhibited at the FC Bayern Munich museum, Allianz Arena Stadium
- Organiser(s): Real Madrid CF
- Founded: 1979; 47 years ago
- Region: Madrid, Spain
- Teams: 2
- Related competitions: Joan Gamper Trophy
- Current champions: Real Madrid (2018)
- Most championships: Real Madrid (28 titles)
- Broadcaster: Real Madrid TV

The Santiago Bernabéu Trophy (Spanish: Trofeo Santiago Bernabéu) is dedicated to the memory of long-time Real Madrid president Santiago Bernabéu. It is a friendly tournament organised each year by Real Madrid at the beginning of the season, somewhere around the end of August or the beginning of September.

From 1979 to 1982, in 1984 and in 1986 it was contested by four teams, with semi-finals, third place match and final. In 1983, 1985 and since 1987 only one match between Real Madrid and an invited team was played.

The 2002 tournament again consisted of four teams, on the special occasion of Real Madrid's centenary as the team was founded on 6 March 1902.

== Finals ==
Note: In case of a draw, the winner was decided on penalties.

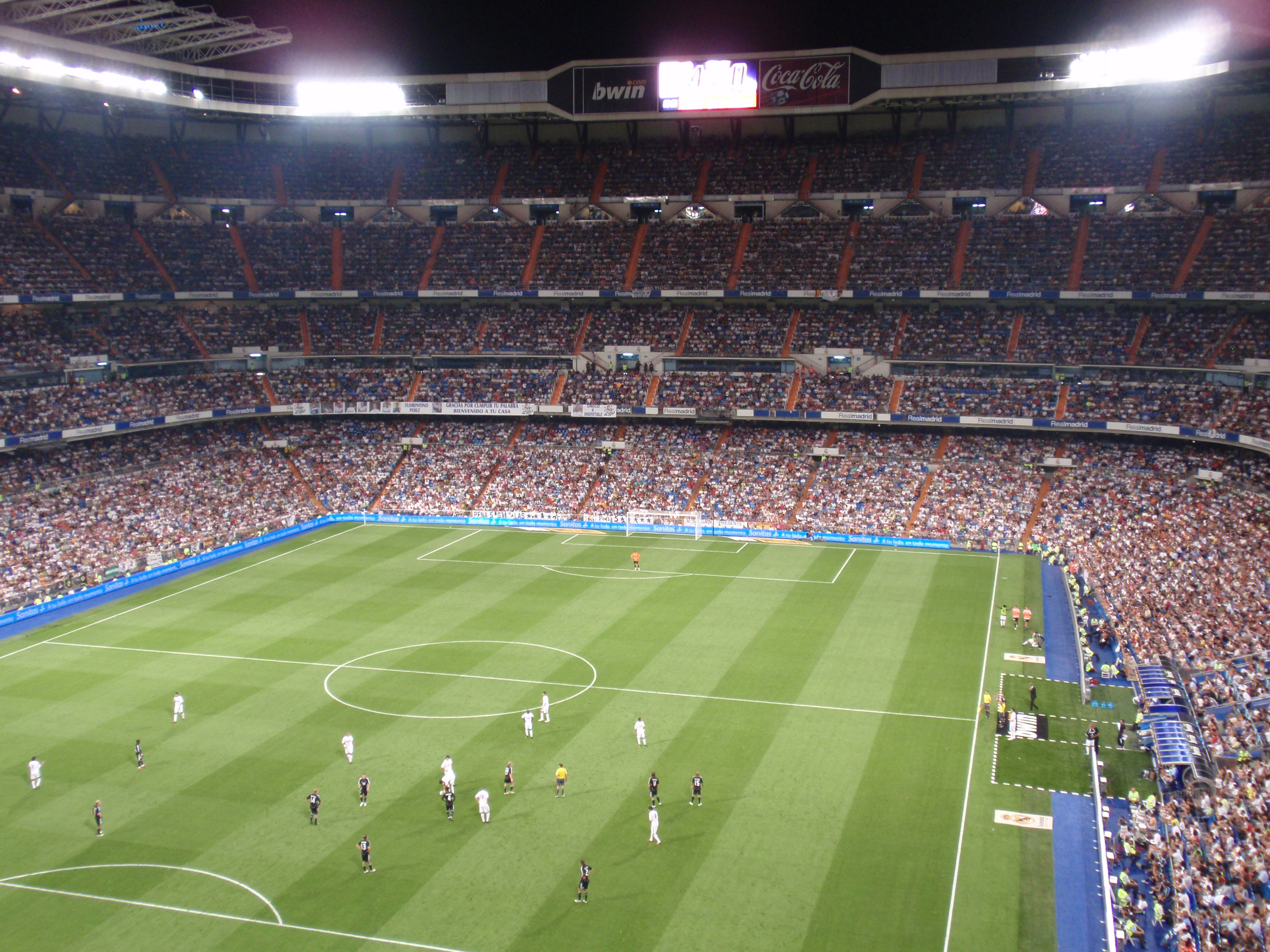
Santiago Bernabéu Stadium during the Real Madrid v Rosenborg match in 2009

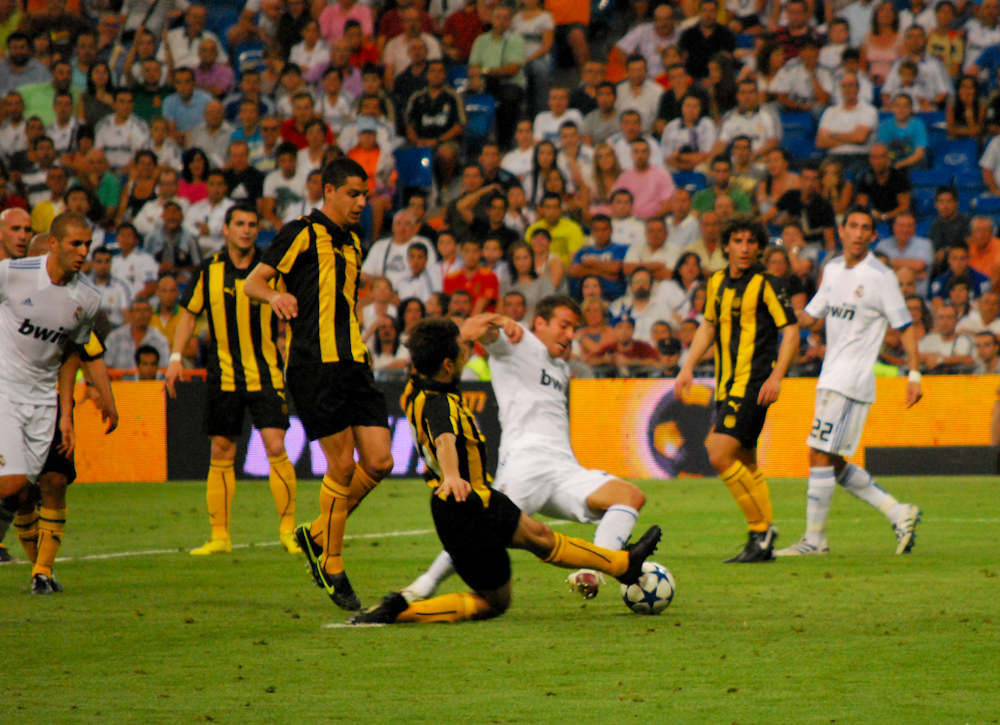
A moment of the 2010 edition, Real Madrid v Peñarol

Ed.	Year	Winners	Score	Runners-up
1	1979	(West Germany) Bayern Munich	2–0	(Netherlands) Ajax
2	1980	(West Germany) Bayern Munich	1–1 (5–4 p)	(Spain) Real Madrid
3	1981	(Spain) Real Madrid	0–0 (4–2 p)	(Netherlands) AZ
4	1982	(West Germany) Hamburger SV	3–1	(Belgium) Standard Liège
5	1983	(Spain) Real Madrid	3–2	(West Germany) Hamburger SV
6	1984	(Spain) Real Madrid	4–1	(West Germany) 1. FC Köln
7	1985	(Spain) Real Madrid	4–2	(West Germany) Bayern Munich
8	1986	(Soviet Union) Dynamo Kyiv	3–2	(Spain) Real Madrid
9	1987	(Spain) Real Madrid	6–1	(England) Everton
10	1988	(Italy) Milan	3–0	(Spain) Real Madrid
11	1989	(Spain) Real Madrid	2–0	(England) Liverpool
12	1990	(Italy) Milan	3–1	(Spain) Real Madrid
13	1991	(Spain) Real Madrid	6–1	(Chile) Colo-Colo
14	1992	(Netherlands) Ajax	3–1	(Spain) Real Madrid
15	1993	(Italy) Inter Milan	2–2 (10–9 p)	(Spain) Real Madrid
16	1994	(Spain) Real Madrid	3–2	(Brazil) Palmeiras
17	1995	(Spain) Real Madrid	1–0	(Netherlands) Ajax
18	1996	(Spain) Real Madrid	4–0	(Portugal) Benfica
19	1997	(Spain) Real Madrid	1–0	(Brazil) Portuguesa
20	1998	(Spain) Real Madrid	4–0	(Uruguay) Peñarol
21	1999	(Spain) Real Madrid	4–2	(Italy) Milan
22	2000	(Spain) Real Madrid	2–0	(Brazil) Santos
23	2001	(Italy) Inter Milan	2–1	(Spain) Real Madrid
24	2002	(Germany) Bayern Munich	2–1	(Spain) Real Madrid
25	2003	(Spain) Real Madrid	3–1	(Argentina) River Plate
26	2004	(Mexico) Pumas UNAM	1–0	(Spain) Real Madrid
27	2005	(Spain) Real Madrid	5–0	(United States) MLS Select Team
28	2006	(Spain) Real Madrid	2–1	(Belgium) Anderlecht
29	2007	(Spain) Real Madrid	2–0	(Serbia) Partizan
30	2008	(Spain) Real Madrid	5–3	(Portugal) Sporting CP
31	2009	(Spain) Real Madrid	4–0	(Norway) Rosenborg
32	2010	(Spain) Real Madrid	2–0	(Uruguay) Peñarol
33	2011	(Spain) Real Madrid	2–1	(Turkey) Galatasaray
34	2012	(Spain) Real Madrid	8–0	(Colombia) Millonarios
35	2013	(Spain) Real Madrid	5–0	(Qatar) Al Sadd
–	2014	(Not held)		
36	2015	(Spain) Real Madrid	2–1	(Turkey) Galatasaray
37	2016	(Spain) Real Madrid	5–3	(France) Reims
38	2017	(Spain) Real Madrid	2–1	(Italy) Fiorentina
39	2018	(Spain) Real Madrid	3–1	(Italy) Milan
–	2019–2025	(Not held)		

== Titles by team ==
Team	Winner	Runner-up	Third	Fourth	Total
(Spain) Real Madrid	28	9	2	—	39
(Germany) Bayern Munich	3	1	—	1	5
(Italy) Milan	2	2	—	2	6
(Italy) Inter Milan	2	0	—	—	2
(Netherlands) Ajax	1	2	—	—	3
(Germany) Hamburger SV	1	1	—	—	2
(Ukraine) Dynamo Kyiv	1	—	1	—	2
(Mexico) Pumas UNAM	1	—	—	—	1
(Turkey) Galatasaray	—	2	—	—	2
(Uruguay) Peñarol	—	2	—	—	2
(Belgium) Anderlecht	—	1	1	1	3
(England) Liverpool	—	1	1	—	2
(Portugal) Benfica	—	1	—	1	2
(Qatar) Al Sadd	—	1	—	—	1
(Netherlands) AZ	—	1	—	—	1
(Chile) Colo-Colo	—	1	—	—	1
(England) Everton	—	1	—	—	1
(Italy) Fiorentina	—	1	—	—	1
(Germany) 1. FC Köln	—	1	—	—	1
(Colombia) Millonarios	—	1	—	—	1
(United States) MLS Select Team	—	1	—	—	1
(Brazil) Palmeiras	—	1	—	—	1
(Serbia) Partizan	—	1	—	—	1
(Brazil) Portuguesa	—	1	—	—	1
(Brazil) Santos	—	1	—	—	1
(Portugal) Sporting CP	—	1	—	—	1
(France) Reims	—	1	—	—	1
(Belgium) Standard Liège	—	1	—	—	1
(Argentina) River Plate	—	1	—	—	1
(Norway) Rosenborg	—	1	—	—	1
(Georgia (country)) Dinamo Tbilisi	—	—	1	—	1
(Romania) Steaua București	—	—	1	—	1
(Netherlands) Feyenoord	—	—	—	1	1
(France) Bordeaux	—	—	—	1	1

== Top goalscorers ==
Position	Player	Club	Goals
1	(Spain) Emilio Butragueño	(Spain) Real Madrid	8
2	(Spain) Míchel	(Spain) Real Madrid	7
3	(France) Karim Benzema	(Spain) Real Madrid	6
3	(Mexico) Hugo Sánchez	(Spain) Real Madrid	6
5	(Spain) Raúl	(Spain) Real Madrid	5
5	(Spain) Santillana	(Spain) Real Madrid	5
7	(England) Laurie Cunningham	(Spain) Real Madrid	4
