= Gerardo Galindo =

Mexican footballer (born 1978)

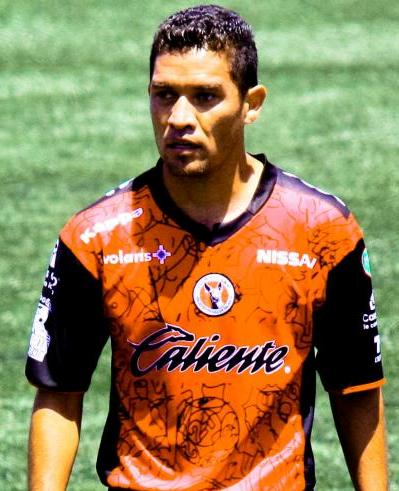
- Galindo playing for Tijuana

Personal information
- Full name: Gerardo Gabriel Galindo Martínez
- Date of birth: 23 May 1978 (age 48)
- Place of birth: Cuernavaca, Morelos, Mexico
- Height: 1.73 m (5 ft 8 in)
- Position: Defensive midfielder

Senior career*
Years	Team	Apps	(Gls)
1997–2006	Pumas	217	(2)
2006–2012	Necaxa	79	(1)
2008–2010	→ Monterrey (loan)	44	(0)
2010–2011	→ Tijuana (loan)	31	(0)
2012	→ Tecos (loan)	11	(0)
2013	Altamira	6	(0)

International career^{‡}
2000–2007	Mexico	10	(2)

Managerial career
- 2015–2016: Querétaro Reserves and Academy
- 2017: Querétaro (Assistant)
- 2019–2020: Pumas (youth)
- * Club domestic league appearances and goals as of 27 April 2013 ‡ National team caps and goals as of 2 May 2009

Gerardo Gabriel Galindo Martínez (Note: In this Spanish name, the first or paternal surname is Galindo and the second or maternal family name is Martínez.) (born 23 May 1978) is a Mexican former professional footballer who plays as a defensive midfielder.

== Playing career ==
=== Club ===
Gerardo debuted in a victory 1–0 over Atlante. El Jerry was a vital part in Pumas 2 championships in a row in 2004. Although debuting in 1997, it was in 2001 when he gained a starting spot in Pumas.

=== International ===
Being a starter player in Hugo Sánchez's coaching career in Pumas, he has also been called to play with Mexico, such as qualification games for the 2006 FIFA World Cup.

== Managerial career ==
In 2013, after being diagnosed with cancer, Galindo had treatments to remove a tumor. The tumor returned months later, thus forcing Galindo into retirement. In 2017, Galindo joined former Pumas teammate Jaime Lozano, to be an assistant coach at Queretaro FC.

== Honours ==
Pumas

- Mexican Torneo de Clausura (2004)
- Mexican Torneo de Apertura (2004)

Club de Futbol Monterrey

- Mexican Torneo de Apertura (2009)

== See also ==
- List of people from Morelos
