= Sergio Bernal =

Mexican footballer (born 1970)

Personal information
- Full name: Sergio Arturo Bernal Hernández
- Date of birth: 9 February 1970 (age 56)
- Place of birth: Mexico City, Mexico
- Height: 1.88 m (6 ft 2 in)
- Position: Goalkeeper

Youth career
- Pumas UNAM

Senior career*
| Years | Team | Apps | (Gls) |
| 1989–2010 | Pumas UNAM | 519 | (0) |
| 2002 | → Puebla (loan) | 11 | (0) |
| Total | | 530 | (0) |

International career
| 2000–2010 | Mexico | 3 | (0) |
Medal record
Men's football
Representing Mexico
Pan American Games
| Silver medal – second place | 1991 Havana | Team |
- * Club domestic league appearances and goals

Sergio Arturo Bernal Hernández (Note: In this Spanish name, the first or paternal surname is Bernal and the second or maternal family name is Hernández.) (born 9 February 1970), also known as "El Puma Mayor" (The Eldest Puma), is a Mexican former professional footballer who played as a goalkeeper for most of his career at Pumas UNAM.

== Club career ==
Bernal played as a goalkeeper for Pumas UNAM, a professional football team in Liga MX. He joined the team in 1988 in their reserves academy. He was champion with Pumas UNAM four times and also served as team captain.

He was the starting goalkeeper in the 2004 campaign where Pumas UNAM were back-to-back champions. He made his 500th Liga MX appearance on 21 February 2010 in a match against Atlante FC where Pumas UNAM won 1-0.

He announced his retirement on 9 December 2010 after 21 years of playing for Pumas UNAM.

== International career ==
Bernal participated in the 2001 USA Cup under Hugo Sánchez. He was called up by Sánchez twice in other occasions but he was unable to play because of shoulder and knee injuries.

== Career statistics ==
=== Club ===
- Fuerzas Básicas del Pumas – (México)
- Pumas UNAM – (México)
- Correcaminos UAT – (México)
- Puebla F.C. – (México)

== Honours ==
Pumas UNAM

- Campeón de Liga (México): 1990–91
- Campeón Clausura (México): 2004, 2009
- Campeón Apertura (México): 2004
