= Primera División de México Clausura 2004 =

Primera División de México
- Season: 2003−04
- Champions: UNAM (4th title)
- Relegated: San Luis
- Champions' Cup: UNAM
- Interliga: Toluca; América; Morelia; Atlante; Guadalajara; UANL; Santos Laguna; Atlas
- Top goalscorer: Bruno Marioni; Andrés Silvera (16 goals)

Primera División de México (Mexican First Division) Clausura 2004 is a Mexican football tournament - one of two short tournaments that take up the entire year to determine the champion(s) of Mexican football. It began on Saturday, January 17, 2004, and ran until May 15, when the regular season ended. On June 13, UNAM defeated Guadalajara in penalty kicks and became champions for the fourth time.

== Clubs ==
Location of the Primera División Clausura 2004 teams

Team	City	Stadium
América	Mexico City	Azteca
Atlante	Ciudad Nezahualcóyotl, State of Mexico	Neza 86; Azteca
Atlas	Guadalajara, Jalisco	Jalisco
Chiapas	Tuxtla Gutiérrez, Chiapas	Víctor Manuel Reyna
Cruz Azul	Mexico City	Azul
Guadalajara	Guadalajara, Jalisco	Jalisco
Irapuato	Irapuato, Guanajuato	Sergio León Chávez
Morelia	Morelia, Michoacán	Morelos
Monterrey	Monterrey, Nuevo León	Tecnológico
Necaxa	Aguascalientes, Aguascalientes	Victoria
Pachuca	Pachuca, Hidalgo	Hidalgo
Puebla	Puebla, Puebla	Cuauhtémoc
Querétaro	Querétaro, Querétaro	Corregidora
San Luis	San Luis Potosí, S.L.P.	Alfonso Lastras
Santos Laguna	Torreón, Coahuila	Corona
Toluca	Toluca, State of Mexico	Nemesio Díez
UAG	Zapopan, Jalisco	Tres de Marzo
UANL	San Nicolás de los Garza, Nuevo León	Universitario
UNAM	Mexico City	Olímpico Universitario
Veracruz	Veracruz, Veracruz	Luis "Pirata" Fuente

== Regular phase ==
Group 1
Pos	Team	Pld	W	D	L	GF	GA	GD	Pts	Qualification
1	Toluca	19	8	6	5	31	25	+6	30	Directly qualified to the Liguilla (Playoffs)
2	Atlas	19	6	9	4	28	25	+3	27	Directly qualified to the Liguilla (Playoffs)
3	Pachuca	19	6	8	5	32	33	−1	26	Qualified for the Repechage
4	Puebla	19	5	5	9	27	29	−2	20	
5	Monterrey	19	2	12	5	28	30	−2	18	

Source: MedioTiempo

Group 2
Pos	Team	Pld	W	D	L	GF	GA	GD	Pts	Qualification
1	UNAM	19	12	5	2	42	19	+23	41	Directly qualified to the Liguilla (Playoffs)
2	América	19	9	5	5	34	27	+7	32	Directly qualified to the Liguilla (Playoffs)
3	Querétaro	19	5	9	5	24	27	−3	24	
4	Santos Laguna	19	6	3	10	31	30	+1	21	
5	UAG	19	5	3	11	32	40	−8	18	

Source: MedioTiempo

Group 3
Pos	Team	Pld	W	D	L	GF	GA	GD	Pts	Qualification
1	Chiapas	19	12	6	1	35	20	+15	42	Directly qualified to the Liguilla (Playoffs)
2	Cruz Azul	19	6	5	8	36	34	+2	23	Qualified for the Repechage
3	UANL	19	6	5	8	37	39	−2	23	
4	Morelia	19	6	4	9	25	35	−10	22	
5	San Luis	19	4	6	9	23	35	−12	18	

Source: MedioTiempo

Group 4
Pos	Team	Pld	W	D	L	GF	GA	GD	Pts	Qualification
1	Guadalajara	19	10	4	5	30	23	+7	34	Directly qualified to the Liguilla (Playoffs)
2	Atlante	19	7	6	6	29	26	+3	27	Directly qualified to the Liguilla (Playoffs)
3	Irapuato	19	6	8	5	23	30	−7	26	
4	Necaxa	19	5	6	8	22	26	−4	21	
5	Veracruz	19	4	5	10	25	41	−16	17	

Source: MedioTiempo

== League table ==
Pos	Team	Pld	W	D	L	GF	GA	GD	Pts	Qualification
1	Chiapas	19	12	6	1	35	20	+15	42	Directly qualified to the Liguilla (Playoffs)
2	UNAM	19	12	5	2	42	19	+23	41	Directly qualified to the Liguilla (Playoffs)
3	Guadalajara	19	10	4	5	30	23	+7	34	Directly qualified to the Liguilla (Playoffs)
4	América	19	9	5	5	34	27	+7	32	Directly qualified to the Liguilla (Playoffs)
5	Toluca	19	8	6	5	31	25	+6	30	Directly qualified to the Liguilla (Playoffs)
6	Atlante	19	7	6	6	29	26	+3	27	Directly qualified to the Liguilla (Playoffs)
7	Atlas	19	6	9	4	28	25	+3	27	Directly qualified to the Liguilla (Playoffs)
8	Pachuca	19	6	8	5	32	33	−1	26	Qualified for the Repechage
9	Irapuato	19	6	8	5	23	30	−7	26	
10	Querétaro	19	5	9	5	24	27	−3	24	
11	Cruz Azul	19	6	5	8	36	34	+2	23	Qualified for the Repechage
12	UANL	19	6	5	8	37	39	−2	23	
13	Morelia	19	6	4	9	25	35	−10	22	
14	Santos Laguna	19	6	3	10	31	30	+1	21	
15	Necaxa	19	5	6	8	22	26	−4	21	
16	Puebla	19	5	5	9	27	29	−2	20	
17	Monterrey	19	2	12	5	28	30	−2	18	
18	UAG	19	5	3	11	32	40	−8	18	
19	San Luis	19	4	6	9	23	35	−12	18	
20	Veracruz	19	4	5	10	25	41	−16	17	

Source: MedioTiempo

== Results ==
Home \ Away	AME	ATE	ATS	CHI	CAZ	GDL	IRA	MTY	MOR	NEC	PAC	PUE	QRO	SNL	SAN	TOL	UAG	UNL	UNM	VER
América	—	1–1	–	–	–	–	–	3–2	-	3–2	1–2	-	1–1	2–0	-	2–1	-	–	1–1	3–2
Atlante	–	—	3–4	–	–	–	–	0–0	–	3–1	3–2	–	2–1	–	2–1	0–1	–	2–4	–	3–3
Atlas	3–1	–	—	0–0	0–2	1–1	–	–	1–1	–	–	1–1	–	–	2–0	–	3–2	2–2	–	–
Chiapas	2–1	2–1	–	—	2–1	2–1	–	–	2–1	–	–	3–1	–	4–2	–	–	3–3	4–2	–	–
Cruz Azul	1–1	1–3	–	–	—	–	3–3	–	–	3–1	1–2	–	2–0	1–4	–	3–1	2–2	–	2–0	–
Guadalajara	0–1	1–0	–	–	4–3	—	2–0	–	–	–	1–0	0–0	2–0	4–1	–	0–0	3–1	–	–	–
Irapuato	2–1	0–0	2–1	0–0	–	–	—	2–1	–	–	–	–	–	3–1	0–3	–	2–3	–	–	3–2
Monterrey	–	–	1–1	0–1	0–0	3–3	–	—	1–1	–	–	2–2	–	–	2–1	–	3–0	3–3	–	–
Morelia	3–6	0–3	–	–	2–0	0–1	1–1	–	—	–	4–1	1–0	–	2–1	–	–	3–2	1–2	–	–
Necaxa	–	–	0–1	0–1	–	3–0	0–1	1–1	2–1	—	–	–	–	–	2–2	–	–	2–1	0–1	1–0
Pachuca	–	–	1–1	3–3	–	–	1–1	1–1	–	0–0	—	–	2–2	–	2–2	1–0	–	–	0–3	2–1
Puebla	1–3	1–1	–	–	3–2	–	6–0	–	–	2–2	3–0	—	1–0	1–2	–	1–2	0–1	–	–	–
Querétaro	–	–	1–0	0–0	–	–	1–1	4–4	2–2	1–1	–	–	—	–	2–0	2–1	–	–	3–3	0–0
San Luis	–	0–0	1–4	–	–	–	–	1–1	–	0–2	1–4	–	3–0	—	–	1–1	–	–	0–0	0–0
Santos Laguna	0–1	–	–	1–1	3–2	0–1	–	–	6–0	–	–	2–0	–	2–0	—	–	2–1	2–3	–	–
Toluca	–	–	2–2	2–1	–	–	1–1	2–0	2–0	2–2	–	–	–	–	4–1	—	–	3–2	2–2	2–3
UAG	1–1	3–0	–	–	–	–	–	–	–	3–0	2–5	–	1–2	1–2	–	1–2	—	–	1–3	3–2
UANL	2–1	0–2	–	–	1–1	4–2	3–1	–	–	–	3–3	2–3	1–2	3–3	–	–	2–1	—	–	–
UNAM	–	–	3–0	0–1	–	3–0	0–0	3–2	2–1	–	–	3–0	–	–	3–2	–	–	2–1	—	6–1
Veracruz	–	–	1–1	1–3	2–6	1–4	–	1–1	0–1	–	–	2–1	–	–	2–1	–	–	1–0	–	—

Updated to match(es) played on 15 May 2004. Source: RSSSF
Legend: Blue = home team win; Yellow = draw; Red = away team win.

== Top goalscorers ==
Players sorted first by goals scored, then by last name. Only regular season goals listed.

Rank	Player	Club	Goals
1	(Argentina) Bruno Marioni	UNAM	16
1	(Argentina) Andrés Silvera	UANL	16
3	(Paraguay) Salvador Cabañas	Chiapas	15
3	(Brazil) Robert de Pinho	Atlas	15
5	(Argentina) Marcelo Delgado	Cruz Azul	13
6	(Mexico) Cuauhtémoc Blanco	América	11
6	(Mexico) Jared Borgetti	Santos Laguna	11
6	(Paraguay) José Cardozo	Toluca	11
6	(Chile) Reinaldo Navia	América	11
10	(Argentina) Carlos Casartelli	Querétaro	10

Source: MedioTiempo

== Final phase (Liguilla) ==
=== Repechage ===
May 19, 2004
17:00

Cruz Azul	2–1	Pachuca
Figueroa 65', 76'	Report	Claudinho 7'

Estadio Azul, Mexico City
Referee: Mauricio Morales (Mexico City)
May 22, 2004
20:00

Pachuca	0–2	Cruz Azul
	Report	Figueroa 66'; Delgado 90'

Estadio Hidalgo, Pachuca
Referee: Germán Arredondo Ramírez (Guanajuato)

Cruz Azul won 4–1 on aggregate.

=== Bracket ===
Quarterfinals
2	UNAM	2	3	5
7	Atlas	1	1	2
1	Chiapas	1	2	3
11	Cruz Azul	2	2	4
3	Guadalajara (s)	0	3	3
6	Atlante	2	1	3
4	América	2	0	2
5	Toluca	3	1	4

Semifinals
2	UNAM	0	3	3
11	Cruz Azul	0	2	2
3	Guadalajara	0	2	2
5	Toluca	1	0	1

Finals
2	UNAM (p)	1	0	1 (5)
3	Guadalajara	1	0	1 (4)

=== Quarterfinals ===
May 27, 2004
20:45

Atlas	1–2	UNAM
Espinoza 47'	Report	Botero 37', 45'

Estadio Jalisco, Guadalajara
Referee: Sergio Fernando Silva (Tamaulipas)
May 30, 2004
12:00

UNAM	3–1	Atlas
Fonseca 30', 87'; Marioni 65'	Report	de Pinho 88'

Estadio Olímpico Universitario, Mexico City
Referee: Manuel Ernesto Glower (Mexico City)

UNAM won 5–2 on aggregate.

May 29, 2004
17:00

Cruz Azul	2–1	Chiapas
Figueroa 21'; Gutiérrez 42' (o.g.)	Report	Rodríguez 54'

Estadio Azul, Mexico City
Referee: Paul Delgadillo (Jalisco)
June 1, 2004
15:00

Chiapas	2–2	Cruz Azul
Mora 52'; Tiba 69' (pen.)	Report	Figueroa 18'; Delgado 44'

Estadio Víctor Manuel Reyna, Tuxtla Gutiérrez
Referee: Jorge Eduardo Gasso (Mexico City)

Cruz Azul won 4–3 on aggregate.

May 26, 2004
20:45

Atlante	2–0	Guadalajara
Rey 30' (pen.); Pacheco 62'	Report

Estadio Azteca, Mexico City
Referee: Gilberto Alcalá Pineda (Mexico City)
May 29, 2004
19:00

Guadalajara	3–1	Atlante
Sabah 52'; Bravo 66'; Palencia 74'	Report	Arce 13'

Estadio Jalisco, Guadalajara
Referee: Germán Arredondo Ramírez (Guanajuato)

3–3 on aggregate. Guadalajara advanced for being the higher seeded team.

May 27, 2004
15:00

Toluca	3–2	América
da Silva 28', 80'; Lozano 75'	Report	Navia 2', 51'

Estadio Nemesio Díez, Toluca
Referee: Armando Archundia (Estado de México)
May 30, 2004
18:00

América	0–1	Toluca
	Report	López 80'

Estadio Azteca, Mexico City
Referee: Hugo León Guajardo (Mexico City)

Toluca won 4–2 on aggregate.

=== Semifinals ===
June 4, 2004
17:00

Cruz Azul	0–0	UNAM
	Report

Estadio Azul, Mexico City
Referee: Gilberto Alcalá Pineda (Mexico City)
June 6, 2004
12:00

UNAM	3–2	Cruz Azul
Marioni 16'; Íñiguez 57'; Lozano 75' (pen.)	Report	Figueroa 14', 68'

Estadio Olímpico Universitario, Mexico City
Referee: José Abramo Lira (Nuevo León)

UNAM won 3–2 on aggregate.

June 2, 2004
15:00

Toluca	1–0	Guadalajara
Abundis 63'	Report

Estadio Nemesio Díez, Toluca
Referee: Mauricio Morales (Mexico City)
June 5, 2004
20:00

Guadalajara	2–0	Toluca
Morales 59' (pen.); Ramírez 82'	Report

Estadio Jalisco, Guadalajara
Referee: Marco Antonio Rodríguez (Mexico City)

Guadalajara won 2–1 on aggregate.

=== Finals ===
June 10, 2004
20:45

Guadalajara	1–1	UNAM
Morales 86' (pen.)	Report	J. López 76'

Estadio Jalisco, Guadalajara
Referee: Manuel Ernesto Glower (Mexico City)
June 13, 2004
12:00

UNAM	0–0 (a.e.t.)	Guadalajara
	Report
Penalties
Lozano (penalty scored); del Olmo (penalty scored); Beltrán (penalty scored); Fonseca (penalty scored); da Silva (penalty scored)	5−4	(penalty scored) Bautista; (penalty scored) Sol; (penalty scored) Palencia; (penalty scored) Bravo; (penalty missed) Medina

Estadio Olímpico Universitario, Mexico City
Referee: Gilberto Alcalá Pineda (Mexico City)

1–1 on aggregate. UNAM won 5–4 on penalty kicks.

Champions

4th title

== Relegation ==
Pos.	Team	Pts.	Pld.	Ave.
13.	Irapuato (Note: Due to the reduction of participating teams to 18. Irapuato was disaffiliated by the Mexican Football Federation due to suspicions of corruption in their finances.)	48	38	1.2631
16.	Monterrey	136	112	1.2142
17.	Querétaro (Note: Due to the reduction of participating teams to 18. Querétaro was disaffiliated by the Mexican Football Federation due to suspicions of corruption in their finances.)	127	112	1.1339
18.	UAG	118	112	1.0535
19.	Puebla	112	112	1.0000
20.	San Luis	73	76	0.9605
