= 2002–03 Monarcas Morelia season =

Morelia
2002–03 season
- Manager: Rubén Omar Romano
- Stadium: Estadio Morelos
- Apertura: Runners-up (4th)
- Clausura: Runners-up (1st)
- CONCACAF Champions' Cup: Final^{[A]}
- Top goalscorer: League: Adolfo Bautista (19 goals); All: Adolfo Bautista (24 goals)
- Biggest win: Morelia 6–0 Necaxa (7 May 2003)
- Biggest defeat: Toluca 4–1 Morelia (21 December 2002)
Home colours	Away colours

The 2002–03 season was Morelia's 53rd season in existence and their 22nd consecutive season in the top flight of Mexican football. The club participated in the Apertura and Clausura tournaments of the Mexican Primera División and in the 2003 CONCACAF Champions' Cup (the entire tournament, except for the finals, were played on the first semester of 2003).

Monarcas Morelia had a partially successful season. They achieved to reach both Apertura and Clausura tournaments' finals, but lost them both. They were defeated by Toluca in the Apertura tournament final and lost the Clausura tournament to Monterrey, despite ending the regular tournament as leaders of the championship.

Internationally, Morelia qualified to the CONCACAF Champion's Cup final, that would be played on the team's next season.

== Players ==
=== Apertura ===
No.	Pos.	Nat.	Name	Date of birth (age)	Since
1	GK	(Mexico)	Miguel Fuentes	29 September 1971 (aged 30)	2002
3	DF	(Mexico)	Omar Rodríguez	15 August 1975 (aged 26)	2002
4	DF	(Mexico)	Carlos Humberto González	3 November 1977 (aged 24)	2002
5	DF	(Mexico)	Heriberto Morales	10 March 1975 (aged 27)	1998
7	FW	(Mexico)	Antonio González	11 February 1979 (aged 23)	2000
8	MF	(Argentina)	Jorge Almirón	19 June 1971 (aged 31)	2000
9	FW	(Brazil)	Alex Fernandes	4 April 1973 (aged 29)	1999
10	FW	(Mexico)	Adolfo Bautista	15 May 1979 (aged 23)	2002
11	FW	(Argentina)	Martín Gómez	26 January 1983 (aged 19)	2001
12	GK	(Mexico)	Sergio Cisneros	13 December 1976 (aged 25)	1999
13	MF	(Mexico)	Miguel Hernández	20 March 1976 (aged 26)	1997
15	DF	(Mexico)	Mario Ruiz	12 January 1977 (aged 25)	1999
16	DF	(Mexico)	Eduardo Rodríguez	13 October 1979 (aged 22)	2000
17	MF	(Mexico)	José Antonio Noriega	29 December 1969 (aged 32)	2000
18	MF	(Argentina)	Hernán Buján	5 December 1974 (aged 27)	2002
19	FW	(Mexico)	Alejandro Leyva	14 May 1980 (aged 22)	2001
20	MF	(Mexico)	Ismael Íñiguez	23 July 1981 (aged 21)	2001
22	MF	(Mexico)	Javier Lozano	9 February 1971 (aged 31)	1999
23	MF	(Mexico)	Javier Saavedra	13 March 1973 (aged 29)	2002
27	DF	(Mexico)	Omar Trujillo	9 November 1977 (aged 24)	1998
28	MF	(Mexico)	Carlos Adrián Morales	6 September 1979 (aged 22)	1998
30	GK	(Mexico)	Moisés Muñoz	1 February 1980 (aged 22)	1999
58	DF	(Argentina)	Darío Franco (Captain)	17 January 1969 (aged 33)	1998

=== Clausura ===
No.	Pos.	Nat.	Name	Date of birth (age)	Since
1	GK	(Mexico)	Miguel Fuentes	29 September 1971 (aged 31)	2002
4	DF	(Mexico)	Carlos Humberto González	3 November 1977 (aged 25)	2002
5	DF	(Mexico)	Christian Ramírez	8 August 1978 (aged 24)	2003
6	DF	(Mexico)	Ignacio Carrasco	30 June 1982 (aged 20)	2002
7	MF	(Peru)	Roberto Palacios	28 December 1972 (aged 30)	2003
8	MF	(Argentina)	Jorge Almirón	19 June 1971 (aged 31)	2000
9	FW	(Chile)	Reinaldo Navia	10 May 1978 (aged 24)	2003
10	FW	(Mexico)	Adolfo Bautista	15 May 1979 (aged 23)	2002
11	FW	(Argentina)	Martín Gómez	26 January 1983 (aged 19)	2001
12	DF	(Mexico)	Enrique Vizcarra	24 December 1975 (aged 27)	2003
13	MF	(Mexico)	Miguel Hernández	20 March 1976 (aged 26)	1997
14	MF	(Mexico)	Juan Antonio Urteaga	28 February 1979 (aged 23)	2003
15	DF	(Mexico)	Mario Ruiz	12 January 1977 (aged 25)	1999
18	MF	(Argentina)	Damián Álvarez	21 May 1979 (aged 23)	2003
20	FW	(Mexico)	Ismael Íñiguez	23 July 1981 (aged 21)	2001
23	MF	(Mexico)	Javier Saavedra	13 March 1973 (aged 29)	2002
24	DF	(Mexico)	Alejandro Pliego	4 January 1982 (aged 21)	2003
27	DF	(Mexico)	Omar Trujillo	9 November 1977 (aged 25)	1998
28	MF	(Mexico)	Carlos Adrián Morales	6 September 1979 (aged 23)	1998
30	GK	(Mexico)	Moisés Muñoz	1 February 1980 (aged 22)	1999
33	DF	(Mexico)	Carlos Gutiérrez	3 September 1979 (aged 23)	2003
53	MF	(Mexico)	Ricardo Ruelas	18 October 1982 (aged 20)	2003
58	DF	(Argentina)	Darío Franco (Captain)	17 January 1969 (aged 33)	1998
61	FW	(Mexico)	Oribe Peralta	12 January 1984 (aged 18)	2003
67	DF	(Mexico)	Charel Hernández	6 November 1984 (aged 18)	2003

== Transfers ==
=== In ===
No.	Pos.	Nat.	Player	Moving from	Type	Transfer window	Ref.
4	DF	(Mexico)	Humberto González	UAG	Transfer	Summer	
10	DF	(Mexico)	Adolfo Bautista	UAG	Transfer	Summer	
18	MF	(Argentina)	Hernán Buján	(Argentina) Huracán	Transfer	Summer	
23	MF	(Mexico)	Javier Saavedra	UANL	Loan	Summer	
5	DF	(Mexico)	Christian Ramírez	Toluca	Transfer	Winter	
7	MF	(Peru)	Roberto Palacios	UAG	Transfer	Winter	
9	FW	(Chile)	Reinaldo Navia	UAG	Transfer	Winter	
12	DF	(Mexico)	Enrique Vizcarra	Santos Laguna	Transfer	Winter	
14	MF	(Mexico)	Juan Antonio Urteaga	León	Transfer	Winter	
18	FW	(Argentina)	Damián Álvarez	(Argentina) River Plate	Transfer	Winter	
61	FW	(Mexico)	Oribe Peralta	Academy	Promotion	Winter	

=== Out ===
No.	Pos.	Nat.	Player	Moving to	Type	Transfer window	Ref.
4	DF	(Mexico)	Heriberto Morales	Guadalajara	Transfer	Winter	
7	FW	(Mexico)	Antonio González	Irapuato	Transfer	Winter	
9	FW	(Brazil)	Alex Fernandes	Monterrey	Transfer	Winter	
12	GK	(Mexico)	Sergio Cisneros	Acapulco	Transfer	Winter	
17	MF	(Mexico)	José Antonio Noriega	Santos Laguna	Transfer	Winter	
18	MF	(Argentina)	Hernán Buján	León	Transfer	Winter	
22	MF	(Mexico)	Javier Lozano	Tabasco	Transfer	Winter	

== Competitions ==
=== Overview ===
Competition	First match	Last match	Starting round	Final position	Record							
Competition	First match	Last match	Starting round	Final position	Pld	W	D	L	GF	GA	GD	Win %
Apertura	3 August 2002	21 December 2002	Matchday 1	Runner-ups	25	13	5	7	49	31	+18	52.00
Clausura	12 January 2003	31 May 2003	Matchday 1	Runner-ups	25	12	7	6	42	27	+15	48.00
CONCACAF Champions' Cup	12 March 2003	7 May 2003	First round	Semifinals^{1}	6	3	1	2	16	3	+13	50.00
Total					56	28	13	15	107	61	+46	50.00

Source: Mediotiempo.com

1. Morelia qualified to the 2003 CONCACAF Champions' Cup final, to be played on the next season.

=== Torneo Apertura ===
==== League table ====
Pos	Team	Pld	W	D	L	GF	GA	GD	Pts	Qualification
2	Toluca	19	12	5	2	55	25	+30	41	Directly qualified to the Liguilla (Playoffs)
3	UNAM	19	10	3	6	39	35	+4	33	Directly qualified to the Liguilla (Playoffs)
4	Morelia	19	9	5	5	35	23	+12	32	Directly qualified to the Liguilla (Playoffs)
5	UAG	19	8	5	6	26	29	−3	29	Directly qualified to the Liguilla (Playoffs)
6	Cruz Azul	19	7	7	5	30	26	+4	28	Directly qualified to the Liguilla (Playoffs)

Source: MedioTiempo

==== Matches ====
3 August 2002 1	Veracruz	3–4	Morelia	Boca del Río, Veracruz
15:00	Terrazas 42'; Rodríguez 66'; Casartelli 89'	Report	C. Morales 9'; Franco 15'; Alex Fernandes 24'; Íñiguez 85'	Stadium: Estadio Luis "Pirata" Fuente; Referee: Marco Antonio Cuevas

10 August 2002 2	Morelia	2–0	Monterrey	Morelia, Michoacán
17:00	Alex Fernandes 5'; Saavedra 29'	Report		Stadium: Estadio Morelos; Referee: Paul Delgadillo

17 August 2002 3	Toluca	4–1	Morelia	Toluca, State of Mexico
15:00	Sinha 8', 70'; Cardozo 21', 42'	Report	Íñiguez 69'	Stadium: Estadio Nemesio Díez; Referee: Felipe Ramos Rizo

24 August 2002 4	Morelia	2–0	Atlas	Morelia, Michoacán
17:00	Íñiguez 4'; Alex Fernandes 32'	Report		Stadium: Estadio Morelos; Referee: Antonio Marrufo

1 September 2002 5	Querétaro	1–0	Morelia	Querétaro City, Querétaro
12:00	Lujambio 19'	Report		Stadium: Estadio Corregidora; Referee: Sergio Silva

7 September 2002 6	Morelia	2–0	Puebla	Morelia, Michoacán
17:00	Saavedra 2'; Íñiguez 66'	Report		Stadium: Estadio Morelos; Referee: Armando Archundia

11 September 2002 7	América	1–1	Morelia	Tlalpan, Mexico City
20:00	Blanco 39' (pen.)	Report	Íñiguez 3'	Stadium: Estadio Azteca

14 September 2002 8	Morelia	2–0	Chiapas	Morelia, Michoacán
17:00	Noriega 85', 89'	Report		Stadium: Estadio Morelos; Referee: José Abramo Lira

21 September 2002 9	Cruz Azul	1–3	Morelia	Benito Juárez, Mexico City
17:00	Zepeda 8'	Report	Alex Fernandes 18', 50'; Saavedra 88'	Stadium: Estadio Azul; Referee: Hugo León Guajardo

29 September 2002 10	Morelia	1–0	UAG	Morelia, Michoacán
16:00	Alex Fernandes 20'	Report		Stadium: Estadio Morelos; Referee: Germán Arredondo

5 October 2002 11	UANL	2–1	Morelia	San Nicolás de los Garza, Nuevo León
17:00	Chávez 44'; Suárez 58'	Report	Alex Fernandes 40'	Stadium: Estadio Universitario; Referee: Sergio Silva

12 October 2002 12	Morelia	1–1	Pachuca	Morelia, Michoacán
17:00	Bautista 51'	Report	Arango 86'	Stadium: Estadio Morelos; Referee: Felipe Ramos Rizo

16 October 2002 13	Guadalajara	1–0	Morelia	Guadalajara, Jalisco
20:45	Mora 72'	Report		Stadium: Estadio Jalisco; Referee: Armando Archundia

20 October 2002 14	Morelia	3–2	San Luis	Morelia, Michoacán
16:00	Alex Fernandes 25', 88'; Saavedra 37'	Report	Santibáñez 61'; Rodríguez 75' (o.g.)	Stadium: Estadio Morelos; Referee: Eduardo Brizio

27 October 2002 15	Santos Laguna	2–2	Morelia	Torreón, Coahuila
16:00	Caniza 3'; J. Rodríguez 57'	Report	Alex Fernandes 67'; O. Rodríguez 80'	Stadium: Estadio Corona; Referee: José de Jesús Robles

2 November 2002 16	Morelia	6–0	Necaxa	Morelia, Michoacán
17:00	Franco 12'; Alex Fernandes 34'; Bautista 39', 47'; Íñiguez 73'; Lozano 82'	Report		Stadium: Estadio Morelos; Referee: Marco Antonio Rodríguez

10 November 2002 17	Atlante	2–1	Morelia	Ciudad Nezahualcóyotl, State of Mexico
12:00	González 47'; Paredes 56'	Report	Alex Fernandes 35'	Stadium: Estadio Neza 86; Referee: Hugo León Guajardo

16 November 2002 18	Celaya	1–1	Morelia	Celaya, Guanajuato
15:00	Claudinho 38'	Report	Franco 52'	Stadium: Estadio Miguel Alemán Valdés; Referee: Gilberto Alcalá

24 November 2002 19	Morelia	2–2	UNAM	Morelia, Michoacán
16:00	Saavedra 25'; Alex Fernandes 49'	Report	J. López 85'; dos Santos 88'	Stadium: Estadio Morelos; Referee: Eduardo Brizio

==== Playoffs ====
===== Quarterfinals =====
4 December 2002 First leg	UAG	1–3	Morelia	Zapopan, Jalisco
16:00	Donizete 35'	Report	Almirón 7'; Morales 65'; González 79'	Stadium: Estadio Tres de Marzo; Referee: Sergio Silva

7 December 2002 Second leg	Morelia	4–1 (7–2 agg.)	UAG	Morelia, Michoacán
20:00	Alex Fernandes 21'; Saavedra 62'; Bautista 73'; Buján 82'	Report	Donizete 26'	Stadium: Estadio Morelos; Referee: José Abramo Lira

===== Semifinals =====
12 December 2002 First leg	Morelia	4–0	UNAM	Morelia, Michoacán
20:00	Bautista 14', 55'; Saavedra 29'; Alex Fernandes 43'	Report		Stadium: Estadio Morelos; Referee: Eduardo Brizio

15 December 2002 Second leg	UNAM	2–1 (2–5 agg.)	Morelia	Coyoacán, Mexico City
12:00	Lemos 32'; A. González 45'	Report	Bautista 39'	Stadium: Estadio Olímpico Universitario; Referee: Felipe Ramos Rizo

===== Final =====
18 December 2002 First leg	Morelia	1–0	Toluca	Morelia, Michoacán
20:00	Saavedra 58'	Report		Stadium: Estadio Morelos; Referee: Eduardo Brizio

21 December 2002 Second leg	Toluca	4–1 (4–2 agg.)	Morelia	Toluca, State of Mexico
15:00	Carmona 32'; López 40'; Cardozo 50'; García 64'	Report	Bautista 1'	Stadium: Estadio Nemesio Díez; Referee: Felipe Ramos Rizo

=== Torneo Clausura ===
==== League table ====
Pos	Team	Pld	W	D	L	GF	GA	GD	Pts	Qualification
1	Morelia	19	10	5	4	34	20	+14	35	Directly qualified to the Liguilla (Playoffs)
2	Atlante	19	10	4	5	39	26	+13	34	Directly qualified to the Liguilla (Playoffs)
3	Monterrey	19	9	7	3	31	22	+9	34	Directly qualified to the Liguilla (Playoffs)
4	UANL	19	10	4	5	25	22	+3	34	Directly qualified to the Liguilla (Playoffs)
5	Toluca	19	10	3	6	40	30	+10	33	Directly qualified to the Liguilla (Playoffs)

Source: MedioTiempo

==== Matches ====
11 January 2003 1	Morelia	2–1	Veracruz	Morelia, Michoacán
17:00	Morales 27'; Íñiguez 82'	Report	Rodríguez 6'	Stadium: Estadio Morelos; Referee: Paul Delgadillo

18 January 2003 2	Monterrey	4–2	Morelia	Monterrey, Nuevo León
17:00	Román 10'; G. Franco 15'; Mendoza 25'; Alex Fernandes 48'	Report	Bautista 34'; D. Franco 38'	Stadium: Estadio Tecnológico; Referee: Sergio Silva

25 January 2003 3	Morelia	1–1	Toluca	Morelia, Michoacán
17:00	Almirón 84'	Report	Cardozo 18'	Stadium: Estadio Morelos; Referee: Armando Archundia

1 February 2003 4	Atlas	1–0	Morelia	Guadalajara, Jalisco
20:45	Rodríguez 35'	Report		Stadium: Estadio Jalisco; Referee: Gilberto Alcalá

8 February 2003 5	Morelia	2–1	Querétaro	Morelia, Michoacán
17:00	Navia 53'; Saavedra 82'	Report	González 48'	Stadium: Estadio Morelos; Referee: José Abramo Lira

16 February 2003 6	Puebla	1–6	Morelia	Puebla City, Puebla
12:00	Martínez 17'	Report	Saavedra 6'; Álvarez 9'; Palacios 18'; Navia 33', 81'; Bautista 68'	Stadium: Estadio Cuauhtémoc; Referee: Marco Antonio Rodríguez

22 February 2003 7	Morelia	1–2	América	Morelia, Michoacán
17:00	Bautista 85'	Report	Pardo 50'; Blanco 84'	Stadium: Estadio Morelos; Referee: Armando Archundia

1 March 2003 8	Chiapas	1–2	Morelia	Tuxtla Gutiérrez, Chiapas
15:00	Fernández 41'	Report	Álvarez 52'; Navia 65'	Stadium: Estadio Víctor Manuel Reyna; Referee: Felipe Ramos Rizo

8 March 2003 9	Morelia	1–1	Cruz Azul	Morelia, Michoacán
17:00	Navia 19'	Report	Almaguer 89'	Stadium: Estadio Morelos; Referee: Gilberto Alcalá

15 March 2003 10	UAG	0–2	Morelia	Zapopan, Jalisco
15:00		Report	Palacios 24'; Íñiguez 82'	Stadium: Estadio Tres de Marzo; Referee: Mauricio Morales

22 March 2003 11	Morelia	2–0	UANL	Morelia, Michoacán
17:00	Navia 55'; Morales 65'	Report		Stadium: Estadio Morelos; Referee: Manuel Glower

30 March 2003 12	Pachuca	0–0	Morelia	Pachuca, Hidalgo
12:00		Report		Stadium: Estadio Hidalgo; Referee: Felipe Ramos Rizo

5 April 2003 13	Morelia	1–1	Guadalajara	Morelia, Michoacán
17:00	Navia 31'	Report	García 41'	Stadium: Estadio Morelos; Referee: José Abramo Lira

12 April 2003 14	San Luis	2–4	Morelia	San Luis Potosí City, San Luis Potosí
19:00	García 20'; Silva 25'	Report	Navia 4'; Bautista 35', 48'; Morales 77'	Stadium: Estadio Alfonso Lastras; Referee: Hugo León Guajardo

19 April 2003 15	Morelia	4–0	Santos Laguna	Morelia, Michoacán
17:00	Navia 42', 53'; Bautista 67', 72'	Report		Stadium: Estadio Morelos; Referee: Manuel Glower

27 April 2003 16	Necaxa	3–0	Morelia	Tlalpan, Mexico City
16:00	Alves 1'; Larrosa 53'; Luna 80'	Report		Stadium: Estadio Azteca; Referee: Mauricio Morales

3 May 2003 17	Morelia	0–0	Atlante	Morelia, Michoacán
17:00		Report		Stadium: Estadio Morelos; Referee: José Abramo Lira

10 May 2003 18	Morelia	3–1	Cuernavaca	Morelia, Michoacán
17:00	Navia 29', 59'; Saavedra 64'	Report	Bravo 85'	Stadium: Estadio Morelos; Referee: Jorge Eduardo Gasso

18 May 2003 19	UNAM	0–1	Morelia	Coyoacán, Mexico City
12:00		Report	Navia 69' (pen.)	Stadium: Estadio Olímpico Universitario; Attendance: Hugo León Guajardo

==== Playoffs ====
===== Quarterfinals =====
28 May 2003 First leg	Guadalajara	1–1	Morelia	Guadalajara, Jalisco
14:45	Mora 25'	Report	Saavedra 6'	Stadium: Estadio Jalisco; Referee: Gilberto Alcalá

31 May 2003 Second leg	Morelia	4–2 (5–3 agg.)	Guadalajara	Morelia, Michoacán
20:30	Bautista 14'; Palacios 43'; Navia 82'; Íñiguez 89'	Report	Mora 19'; Medina 83'	Stadium: Estadio Morelos; Referee: Marco Antonio Rodríguez

===== Semifinals =====
4 June 2003 First leg	Veracruz	1–0	Morelia	Boca del Río, Veracruz
17:00	Rodríguez 28'	Report		Stadium: Estadio Luis "Pirata" Fuente; Referee: Felipe Ramos Rizo

7 June 2003 Second leg	Morelia	2–0 (2–1 agg.)	Guadalajara	Morelia, Michoacán
20:30	Bautista 10', 66'	Report		Stadium: Estadio Morelos; Referee: Armando Archundia

===== Final =====
11 June 2003 First leg	Monterrey	3–1	Morelia	Monterrey, Nuevo León
20:30	Erviti 1'; Franco 46'; Castro 57'	Report	Bautista 89'	Stadium: Estadio Tecnológico; Referee: Felipe Ramos Rizo

14 June 2003 Second leg	Morelia	0–0 (1–3 agg.)	Monterrey	Morelia, Michoacán
20:30		Report		Stadium: Estadio Morelos; Referee: Marco Antonio Rodríguez

=== CONCACAF Champions' Cup ===
==== Knockout phase ====
===== Round of 16 =====
12 March 2003 First leg	Comunicaciones (Guatemala)	1–0	(Mexico) Morelia	Guatemala City, Guatemala
	Cubero 59'	Report		Stadium: Estadio Cementos Progreso; Attendance: 10,000; Referee: Fredy Zamora (Costa Rica)

26 March 2003 Second leg	Morelia (Mexico)	4–0 (4–1 agg.)	(Guatemala) Comunicaciones	Morelia, Mexico
	Vizcarra 48'; Bautista 71', 74', 81'	Report		Stadium: Estadio Morelos; Referee: Ricardo Valenzuela (United States)

===== Quarterfinals =====
9 April 2003 First leg	Morelia (Mexico)	6–0	(United States) Columbus Crew	Morelia, Mexico
	Palacios 38'; Íñiguez 42', 69'; Bautista 49', 54'; Navia 65'	Report		Stadium: Estadio Morelos; Referee: Joel Aguilar (El Salvador)

16 April 2003 Second leg	Columbus Crew (United States)	2–0 (2–6 agg.)	(Mexico) Morelia	Columbus, United States
	Buddle 15'; Cunningham 27'	Report		Stadium: Columbus Crew Stadium; Referee: Jean-Francois Corrivault (Canada)

===== Semifinals =====
30 April 2003 First leg	Necaxa (Mexico)	0–0	(Mexico) Morelia	Mexico City, Mexico
		Report		Stadium: Estadio Azteca; Referee: Gilberto Alcalá (Mexico)

7 May 2003 Second leg	Morelia (Mexico)	6–0 (6–0 agg.)	(Mexico) Necaxa	Morelia, Mexico
	Navia 9', 21'; Palacios 29'; Hernández 37'; Prieto 37'; Almirón 42'	Report		Stadium: Estadio Morelos; Referee: Armando Archundia (Mexico)

== Statistics ==
=== Appearances and goals ===
No.	Pos.	Player	Total		Apertura		Clausura		Champions' Cup	
No.	Pos.	Player	Apps	Goals	Apps	Goals	Apps	Goals	Apps	Goals
1	GK	(Mexico) Miguel Fuentes	13	0	7	0	2	0	4	0
4	DF	(Mexico) Carlos Humberto González	33	0	9	0	21	0	3	0
5	DF	(Mexico) Christian Ramírez	15	0	–	–	10	0	5	0
6	MF	(Mexico) Ignacio Carrasco	1	0	–	–	1	0	0	0
7	MF	(Peru) Roberto Palacios	25	5	–	–	22	3	3	2
8	MF	(Argentina) Jorge Almirón	51	3	25	1	23	1	3	1
9	FW	(Chile) Reinaldo Navia	25	17	–	–	23	14	2	3
10	FW	(Mexico) Adolfo Bautista	50	24	21	8	24	11	5	5
11	FW	(Argentina) Martín Gómez	26	0	13	0	8	0	5	0
12	DF	(Mexico) Enrique Vizcarra	22	1	–	–	18	0	4	1
13	MF	(Mexico) Miguel Hernández	18	0	2	0	11	0	5	0
14	MF	(Mexico) Juan Antonio Urteaga	5	0	–	–	2	0	3	0
15	DF	(Mexico) Mario Ruiz	45	0	18	0	25	0	2	0
18	MF	(Argentina) Damián Álvarez	19	2	–	–	16	2	3	0
20	FW	(Mexico) Ismael Íñiguez	46	11	16	6	24	3	6	2
23	MF	(Mexico) Javier Saavedra	49	12	23	8	25	4	1	0
24	DF	(Mexico) Alejandro Pliego	4	0	–	–	1	0	3	0
27	DF	(Mexico) Omar Trujillo	30	0	23	0	7	0	0	0
28	MF	(Mexico) Carlos Adrián Morales	49	5	24	2	25	3	0	0
30	GK	(Mexico) Moisés Muñoz	39	0	14	0	23	0	2	0
33	DF	(Mexico) Carlos Gutiérrez	8	0	–	–	3	0	5	0
53	MF	(Mexico) Ricardo Ruelas	2	0	–	–	1	0	1	0
58	DF	(Argentina) Darío Franco	53	4	24	3	24	1	5	0
61	FW	(Mexico) Oribe Peralta	3	0	–	–	2	0	1	0
67	DF	(Mexico) Charel Hernández	5	1	–	–	1	0	4	1
?	DF	(Mexico) Hugo Magallón	1	0	–	–	0	0	1	0
?	?	(Mexico) Francisco Martínez	2	0	–	–	0	0	2	0
?	DF	(Mexico) Éder Morales	2	0	–	–	0	0	2	0
?	FW	(Mexico) Rodrigo Prieto	2	1	–	–	0	0	2	1
?	?	(Mexico) Roberto Rosas	2	0	–	–	0	0	2	0
Players that left the club during the season
2	DF	(Mexico) Jaime Alarcón	0	0	0	0	–	–	–	–
3	DF	(Mexico) Omar Rodríguez	13	1	13	1	–	–	–	–
5	DF	(Mexico) Heriberto Morales	25	0	25	0	–	–	–	–
7	FW	(Mexico) Antonio González	12	1	12	1	–	–	–	–
9	FW	(Brazil) Alex Fernandes	24	15	24	15	–	–	–	–
12	GK	(Mexico) Sergio Cisneros	4	0	4	0	–	–	–	–
16	DF	(Mexico) Eduardo Rodríguez	1	0	1	0	–	–	–	–
17	MF	(Mexico) José Antonio Noriega	25	2	25	2	–	–	–	–
18	MF	(Argentina) Hernán Buján	19	1	19	1	–	–	–	–
19	FW	(Mexico) Alejandro Leyva	3	0	3	0	–	–	–	–
22	MF	(Mexico) Javier Lozano	4	1	4	1	–	–	–	–

=== Goalscorers ===
Rank	Pos.	Player	Apertura	Clausura	Champions' Cup	Total
1	FW	(Mexico) Adolfo Bautista	8	11	5	24
2	FW	(Chile) Reinaldo Navia	–	14	3	17
3	FW	(Brazil) Alex Fernandes	15	–	–	15
4	MF	(Mexico) Javier Saavedra	8	4	0	12
5	FW	(Mexico) Ismael Íñiguez	6	3	2	11
6	MF	(Mexico) Carlos Adrián Morales	2	3	0	5
6	MF	(Peru) Roberto Palacios	–	3	2	5
8	DF	(Argentina) Darío Franco	3	1	0	4
9	MF	(Argentina) Jorge Almirón	1	1	1	3
10	MF	(Mexico) José Antonio Noriega	2	–	–	2
10	MF	(Argentina) Damián Álvarez	–	2	0	2
12	MF	(Argentina) Hernán Buján	1	–	–	1
12	FW	(Mexico) Antonio González	1	–	–	1
12	DF	(Mexico) Charel Hernández	–	0	1	1
12	MF	(Mexico) Javier Lozano	1	–	–	1
12	FW	(Mexico) Rodrigo Prieto	–	0	1	1
12	DF	(Mexico) Omar Rodríguez	1	–	–	1
12	DF	(Mexico) Enrique Vizcarra	–	0	1	1
Total			49	42	16	107

=== Hat-tricks ===
Player	Against	Result	Date	Competition	Ref.
(Mexico) Adolfo Bautista	(Guatemala) Comunicaciones	4–0 (H)	26 March 2003	CONCACAF Champions' Cup	

=== Own goals ===
Player	Against	Result	Date	Competition
(Mexico) Omar Rodríguez	San Luis	3–2 (H)	20 October 2002	Primera División

== Notes ==
A. Morelia qualified to the 2003 CONCACAF Champions' Cup final, to be played on the team's next season.
