= Primera División de México Clausura 2003 =

Primera División de México
- Season: 2002−03
- Champions: Monterrey (2nd title)
- Relegated: Cuernavaca
- Champions' Cup: Monterrey
- Top goalscorer: José Cardozo (21 goals)

Primera División de México (Mexican First Division) Clausura 2003 is a Mexican football tournament - one of two short tournaments that take up the entire year to determine the champion(s) of Mexican football. It began on Saturday, January 11, 2003, and ran until May 17, when the regular season ended. Celaya's franchise was bought out by the owner of Aerolineas Internacionales, Jorge Rodriguez Marie, and it was moved to Cuernavaca. Thus, creating a team that was known as Los Colibries de Morelos. Monterrey defeated Morelia to win their second championship.

== Clubs ==
- The franchise that was known as Celaya was bought by Jorge Rodríguez Marié, who moved the team to Cuernavaca and changed its name to Colibríes de Cuernavaca. Such was the impact of his ownership that the team's nickname, Colibries, came from the logo of his airline, Aerolineas Internacionales, and the company's wordmark also appeared as a shirt sponsor.
Location of the Primera División Clausura 2003 teams

Team	City	Stadium
América	Mexico City	Azteca
Atlante	Ciudad Nezahualcóyotl, State of Mexico	Neza 86
Atlas	Guadalajara, Jalisco	Jalisco
Chiapas	Tuxtla Gutiérrez, Chiapas	Víctor Manuel Reyna
Cruz Azul	Mexico City	Azul
Cuernavaca	Cuernavaca, Morelos	Mariano Matamoros
Guadalajara	Guadalajara, Jalisco	Jalisco
Morelia	Morelia, Michoacán	Morelos
Monterrey	Monterrey, Nuevo León	Tecnológico
Necaxa	Mexico City	Azteca
Pachuca	Pachuca, Hidalgo	Hidalgo
Puebla	Puebla, Puebla	Cuauhtémoc
Querétaro	Querétaro, Querétaro	Corregidora
San Luis	San Luis Potosí, S.L.P.	Alfonso Lastras
Santos Laguna	Torreón, Coahuila	Corona
Toluca	Toluca, State of Mexico	Nemesio Díez
UAG	Zapopan, Jalisco	Tres de Marzo
UANL	San Nicolás de los Garza, Nuevo León	Universitario
UNAM	Mexico City	Olímpico Universitario
Veracruz	Veracruz, Veracruz	Luis "Pirata" Fuente

== Regular phase ==
Group 1
Pos	Team	Pld	W	D	L	GF	GA	GD	Pts	Qualification
1	Toluca	19	10	3	6	40	30	+10	33	Directly qualified to the Liguilla (Playoffs)
2	Atlas	19	8	8	3	29	20	+9	32	Directly qualified to the Liguilla (Playoffs)
3	América	19	8	5	6	29	20	+9	29	
4	Cuernavaca	19	6	5	8	24	27	−3	23	
5	Puebla	19	4	4	11	15	31	−16	16	

Source: MedioTiempo

Group 2
Pos	Team	Pld	W	D	L	GF	GA	GD	Pts	Qualification
1	Monterrey	19	9	7	3	31	22	+9	34	Directly qualified to the Liguilla (Playoffs)
2	UANL	19	10	4	5	25	22	+3	34	Directly qualified to the Liguilla (Playoffs)
3	Pachuca	19	4	9	6	21	23	−2	21	
4	UNAM	19	4	8	7	25	35	−10	20	
5	UAG	19	1	4	14	15	37	−22	7	

Source: MedioTiempo

Group 3
Pos	Team	Pld	W	D	L	GF	GA	GD	Pts	Qualification
1	Morelia	19	10	5	4	34	20	+14	35	Directly qualified to the Liguilla (Playoffs)
2	Cruz Azul	19	5	9	5	24	24	0	24	Qualified for the Repechage
3	Necaxa	19	6	5	8	25	24	+1	23	
4	San Luis	19	5	5	9	25	38	−13	20	
5	Chiapas	19	5	4	10	15	26	−11	19	

Source: MedioTiempo

Group 4
Pos	Team	Pld	W	D	L	GF	GA	GD	Pts	Qualification
1	Atlante	19	10	4	5	39	26	+13	34	Directly qualified to the Liguilla (Playoffs)
2	Veracruz	19	9	5	5	23	18	+5	32	Directly qualified to the Liguilla (Playoffs)
3	Guadalajara	19	8	7	4	32	24	+8	31	Qualified for the Repechage
4	Santos	19	9	3	7	30	24	+6	30	
5	Querétaro	19	3	8	8	13	23	−10	17	

Source: MedioTiempo

== League table ==
Pos	Team	Pld	W	D	L	GF	GA	GD	Pts	Qualification
1	Morelia	19	10	5	4	34	20	+14	35	Directly qualified to the Liguilla (Playoffs)
2	Atlante	19	10	4	5	39	26	+13	34	Directly qualified to the Liguilla (Playoffs)
3	Monterrey	19	9	7	3	31	22	+9	34	Directly qualified to the Liguilla (Playoffs)
4	UANL	19	10	4	5	25	22	+3	34	Directly qualified to the Liguilla (Playoffs)
5	Toluca	19	10	3	6	40	30	+10	33	Directly qualified to the Liguilla (Playoffs)
6	Atlas	19	8	8	3	29	20	+9	32	Directly qualified to the Liguilla (Playoffs)
7	Veracruz	19	9	5	5	23	18	+5	32	Directly qualified to the Liguilla (Playoffs)
8	Guadalajara	19	8	7	4	32	24	+8	31	Qualified for the Repechage
9	Santos Laguna	19	9	3	7	30	24	+6	30	
10	América	19	8	5	6	29	20	+9	29	
11	Cruz Azul	19	5	9	5	24	24	0	24	Qualified for the Repechage
12	Necaxa	19	6	5	8	25	24	+1	23	
13	Cuernavaca	19	6	5	8	24	27	−3	23	
14	Pachuca	19	4	9	6	21	23	−2	21	
15	UNAM	19	4	8	7	25	35	−10	20	
16	San Luis	19	5	5	9	25	38	−13	20	
17	Chiapas	19	5	4	10	15	26	−11	19	
18	Querétaro	19	3	8	8	13	23	−10	17	
19	Puebla	19	4	4	11	15	31	−16	16	
20	UAG	19	1	4	14	15	37	−22	7	

Source: MedioTiempo

== Results ==
Home \ Away	AME	ATE	ATS	CHI	CAZ	CUE	GDL	MTY	MOR	NEC	PAC	PUE	QRO	SNL	SAN	TOL	UAG	UNL	UNM	VER
América	—	1–0	4–4	–	1–3	2–0	1–1	1–1	–	–	–	0–1	–	–	0–1	–	–	0–1	1–1	–
Atlante	–	—	2–4	5–1	–	–	–	1–1	–	4–1	2–1	3–1	–	3–1	–	–	3–2	–	3–1	–
Atlas	–	–	—	1–0	–	0–0	–	–	1–0	0–1	1–0	2–0	–	1–1	–	1–1	2–0	–	–	3–0
Chiapas	0–1	–	–	—	–	0–1	–	–	1–2	0–0	0–0	–	0–0	3–1	–	1–1	1–0	–	–	1–2
Cruz Azul	–	1–3	1–1	0–1	—		3–3	0–0	–	–	–	4–0	–	–	2–2	–	–	1–3	2–0	–
Cuernavaca	–	1–1	–	–	0–0	—	1–1	–	–	2–2	2–3	–	–	2–4	2–3	–	3–0	2–0	–	–
Guadalajara	–	2–3	1–3	2–0	–	–	—	1–1	–	–	3–1	2–1	–	–	1–0	–	3–2	–	1–1	–
Monterrey	–	–	2–2	0–1	–	1–0	–	—	4–2	2–1	3–2	0–0	–	3–1	–	–	3–0	–	–	2–1
Morelia	1–2	0–0	–	–	1–1	3–1	1–1	–	—	–	–	–	2–1	–	4–0	1–1	–	2–0	–	2–1
Necaxa	0–2	–	–	–	4–0	–	2–2	–	3–0	—	–	–	1–0	–	0–1	3–0	–	1–2	–	0–0
Pachuca	2–1	–	–	–	0–0	–	–	–	0–0	2–0	—	–	3–1	2–2	–	0–1	–	1–1	–	1–1
Puebla	–	–	–	3–2	–	0–1	–	–	1–6	1–0	1–1	—	0–2	0–1	–	3–1	2–2	–	–	0–1
Querétaro	1–1	1–0	2–2	–	0–1	1–2	0–2	1–1	–	–	–	–	—	–	1–0	–	–	0–2	0–0	–
San Luis	0–4	–	–	–	2–2	–	0–2	–	2–4	1–0	–	–	1–1	—	–	2–3	–	2–0	–	0–3
Santos Laguna	–	1–0	3–0	1–2	–	–	–	1–2	–	–	2–0	1–1	–	2–0	—	–	3–1	–	4–1	–
Toluca	3–0	2–3	–	–	1–3	4–1	3–2	3–1	–	–	–	–	4–0	–	4–3	—	–	3–1	5–1	–
UAG	0–5	–	–	–	0–0	–	–	–	0–2	1–2	1–1	–	0–0	1–2	–	3–0	—	–	–	1–2
UANL	–	2–1	0–0	3–0	–	–	1–0	2–1	–	–	–	1–0	–	–	2–2	–	1–0	—	2–2	–
UNAM	–	–	2–1	3–1	–	1–3	–	2–3	0–1	4–4	1–1	1–0	–	2–2	–	–	2–1	–	—	–
Veracruz	0–2	2–2	–	–	2–0	1–0	0–2	–	–	–	–	–	1–1	–	1–0	1–0	–	4–1	0–0	—

Updated to match(es) played on 17 May 2003. Source: RSSSF
Legend: Blue = home team win; Yellow = draw; Red = away team win.

== Top goalscorers ==
Players sorted first by goals scored, then by last name. Only regular season goals listed.

Rank	Player	Club	Goals
1	(Paraguay) José Cardozo	Toluca	21
2	(Chile) Sebastián González	Atlante	16
3	(Chile) Reinaldo Navia	Morelia	13
4	(Mexico) Jared Borgetti	Santos Laguna	11
5	(Mexico) Omar Bravo	Guadalajara	10
6	(Colombia) Luis Gabriel Rey	Atlante	9
7	(Uruguay) Sebastián Abreu	Cruz Azul	8
7	(Mexico) Juan Carlos Cacho	Cruz Azul	8
7	(Bolivia) José Alfredo Castillo	UAG	8
7	(Brazil) Claudinho	Cuernavaca	8
7	(Brazil) Alex Fernandes	Monterrey	8
7	(Argentina) Walter Gaitán	UANL	8
7	(Uruguay) Vicente Sánchez	Toluca	8

Source: MedioTiempo

== Final phase (Liguilla) ==
=== Repechage ===
May 22, 2003
20:00

Cruz Azul	4–1	Guadalajara
Cacho 8', 85'; Corona 9'; Palencia 37' (pen.)	Report	Bravo 27'

Estadio Azul, Mexico City
Referee: Marco Antonio Rodríguez (Mexico City)
May 25, 2003
12:00

Guadalajara	4–1	Cruz Azul
J. Sánchez 14'; Bravo 39' (pen.); Jo. García 45'; Ja. García 60'	Report	Palencia 11' (pen.)

Estadio Jalisco, Guadalajara
Referee: José Abramo Lira (Nuevo León)

5–5 on aggregate. Guadalajara advanced for being the higher seeded team.

=== Bracket ===
Quarterfinals
1	Morelia	1	4	5
8	Guadalajara	1	2	3
2	Atlante	1	0	1
7	Veracruz	1	1	2
3	Monterrey	1	3	5
6	Atlas	1	2	4
4	UANL	2	2	4
5	Toluca	2	1	3

Semifinals
1	Morelia	0	2	2
7	Veracruz	1	0	1
3	Monterrey	4	1	5
4	UANL	1	2	3

Finals
1	Morelia	1	0	1
3	Monterrey	3	0	3

=== Quarterfinals ===
May 28, 2003
14:45

Guadalajara	1–1	Morelia
Mora 25' (pen.)	Report	Saavedra 7'

Estadio Jalisco, Guadalajara
Referee: Gilberto Alcalá Pineda (Mexico City)
May 31, 2003
20:30

Morelia	4–2	Guadalajara
Bautista 14'; Palacios 43'; Navia 82'; Íñiguez 90'	Report	Mora 19'; Medina 83'

Estadio Morelos, Morelia
Referee: Marco Antonio Rodríguez (Mexico City)

Morelia won 5–3 on aggregate.

May 29, 2003
17:00

Veracruz	1–1	Atlante
Gutiérrez 67'	Report	Rey 33'

Estadio Luis "Pirata" Fuente, Veracruz
Referee: Jorge Eduardo Gasso (Mexico City)
June 1, 2003
12:00

Atlante	0–1	Veracruz
	Report	Hernández 51' (pen.)

Estadio Neza 86, Ciudad Nezahualcóyotl
Referee: José Abramo Lira (Nuevo León)

Veracruz won 2–1 on aggregate.

May 28, 2003
21:00

Atlas	1–1	Monterrey
J. Rodríguez 54' (pen.)	Report	I. Rodríguez 33'

Estadio Jalisco, Guadalajara
Referee: Manuel Ernesto Glower (Mexico City)
May 31, 2003
17:00

Monterrey	3–2	Atlas
Franco 16', 35'; Huitrón 72'	Report	García 49'; Rodríguez 62'

Estadio Tecnológico, Monterrey
Referee: Armando Archundia (Estado de México)

Monterrey won 4–3 on aggregate.

May 28, 2003
17:00

Toluca	1–2	UANL
Valdéz 50'	Report	Kléber 70', 89'

Estadio Nemesio Díez, Toluca
Referee: Germán Arredondo Ramírez (Guanajuato)
May 31, 2003
20:00

UANL	2–2	Toluca
Alex Mineiro 10'; Kléber 24' (pen.)	Report	Cardozo 68'; Franco 71'

Estadio Universitario, San Nicolás de los Garza
Referee: Felipe Ramos Rizo (Mexico City)

UANL won 4–3 on aggregate.

=== Semifinals ===
June 4, 2003
17:00

Veracruz	1–0	Morelia
Rodríguez 28'	Report

Estadio Luis "Pirata" Fuente, Veracruz
Referee: Felipe Ramos Rizo (Mexico City)
June 7, 2003
20:30

Morelia	2–0	Veracruz
Bautista 11', 66'	Report

Estadio Morelos, Morelia
Referee: Armando Archundia (Estado de México)

Morelia won 2–1 on aggregate.

June 4, 2003
20:45

UANL	1–4	Monterrey
Kléber 29'	Report	Franco 39', 51'; Arellano 76'; Avilán 88'

Estadio Universitario, San Nicolás de los Garza
Referee: Gilberto Alcalá Pineda (Mexico City)
June 7, 2003
19:00

Monterrey	1–2	UANL
Alex 14'	Report	de Nigris 79'; Alex Mineiro 86' (pen.)

Estadio Tecnológico, Monterrey
Referee: Marco Antonio Rodríguez (Mexico City)

Monterrey won 5–3 on aggregate.

=== Finals ===
June 11, 2003
20:30

Monterrey	3–1	Morelia
Erviti 1'; Franco 46'; Castro 57' (pen.)	Report	Bautista 90+3'

Estadio Tecnológico, Monterrey
Referee: Felipe Ramos Rizo (Mexico City)

First leg

Monterrey:
GK	30	(Mexico) Ricardo Martínez
DF	5	(Brazil) Flavio Rogério
DF	4	(Argentina) Pablo Rotchen	(yellow card) 82'
DF	2	(Mexico) Ismael Rodríguez	(yellow card) 78'
DF	71	(Mexico) Elliott Huitrón	(yellow card) 86'
DF	8	(Mexico) Héctor Castro	(yellow card) 38'
MF	18	(Argentina) Walter Erviti	(yellow card) 73'
MF	7	(Mexico) Luis Ernesto Pérez	(yellow card) 6'
MF	28	(Mexico) Jesús Arellano
FW	10	(Argentina) Guillermo Franco	(yellow card) 58'	(substituted off) 90+1'
FW	9	(Brazil) Alex Fernandes	(yellow card) 71'	(substituted off) 71'
Substitutions:
GK	20	(Mexico) Juan de Dios Ibarra
DF	13	(Mexico) Daniel Román
MF	11	(Mexico) Jesús Mendoza
MF	17	(Mexico) Omar Avilán		(substituted on) 71'
MF	19	(Mexico) Hashim Suárez
MF	24	(Mexico) César Adame		(substituted on) 90+1'
FW	64	(Mexico) Tomás Banda
Manager:
(Argentina) Daniel Passarella

Morelia:
GK	30	(Mexico) Moisés Muñoz
DF	4	(Mexico) Carlos González	(yellow card) 11'
DF	58	(Argentina) Darío Franco	(yellow card) 41'
DF	15	(Mexico) Mario Ruíz		(substituted off) 53'
DF	12	(Mexico) Enrique Vizcarra		(substituted off) 79'
MF	8	(Argentina) Jorge Almirón
MF	23	(Mexico) Javier Saavedra
MF	7	(Peru) Roberto Palacios
MF	28	(Mexico) Carlos Adrián Morales
MF	10	(Mexico) Adolfo Bautista
FW	9	(Chile) Reinaldo Navia
Substitutions:
GK	1	(Mexico) Miguel Fuentes
DF	5	(Mexico) Christian Ramírez
DF	13	(Mexico) Miguel Hernández
DF	67	(Mexico) Charel Hernández
MF	18	(Argentina) Damián Álvarez		(substituted on) 53'
MF	20	(Mexico) Ismael Íñiguez		(substituted on) 79'
FW	11	(Mexico) Martín Gómez
Manager:
(Argentina) Rubén Omar Romano

Second leg

June 14, 2003
20:30

Morelia	0–0	Monterrey
	Report

Estadio Morelos, Morelia
Referee: Marco Antonio Rodríguez (Mexico City)

Monterrey won 3–1 on aggregate.

Morelia:
GK	30	(Mexico) Moisés Muñoz
DF	4	(Mexico) Carlos González	(yellow card) 72'
DF	58	(Argentina) Darío Franco
DF	15	(Mexico) Mario Ruíz	(yellow card) 26'	(substituted off) 46'
MF	23	(Mexico) Javier Saavedra
MF	8	(Argentina) Jorge Almirón	(yellow card) 11'
MF	18	(Argentina) Damián Álvarez		(substituted off) 50'
MF	7	(Peru) Roberto Palacios
MF	28	(Mexico) Carlos Adrián Morales
MF	10	(Mexico) Adolfo Bautista
FW	9	(Chile) Reinaldo Navia	(yellow card) 68'
Substitutions:
GK	1	(Mexico) Miguel Fuentes
DF	5	(Mexico) Christian Ramírez
DF	12	(Mexico) Enrique Vizcarra
DF	13	(Mexico) Miguel Hernández
MF	20	(Mexico) Ismael Íñiguez		(substituted on) 46'
MF	85	(Mexico) Hugo Magallón
FW	11	(Mexico) Martín Gómez		(substituted on) 50'
Manager:
(Argentina) Rubén Omar Romano

Monterrey:
GK	30	(Mexico) Ricardo Martínez	(yellow card) 39'
DF	5	(Brazil) Flavio Rogério
DF	4	(Argentina) Pablo Rotchen
DF	2	(Mexico) Ismael Rodríguez
DF	8	(Mexico) Héctor Castro
MF	15	(Mexico) Paulo Chávez
MF	18	(Argentina) Walter Erviti		(substituted off) 64'
MF	7	(Mexico) Luis Ernesto Pérez
MF	28	(Mexico) Jesús Arellano		(substituted off) 88'
FW	10	(Argentina) Guillermo Franco
FW	9	(Brazil) Alex Fernandes	(yellow card) 30'	(substituted off) 55'
Substitutions:
GK	20	(Mexico) Juan de Dios Ibarra
DF	13	(Mexico) Daniel Román
DF	71	(Mexico) Tomás Banda		(substituted on) 64'
MF	11	(Mexico) Jesús Mendoza		(substituted on) 88'
MF	17	(Mexico) Omar Avilán		(substituted on) 55'
MF	19	(Mexico) Hashim Suárez
MF	24	(Mexico) César Adame
Manager:
(Argentina) Daniel Passarella

Champions

2nd title

== Relegation ==
Pos.	Team	Pts.	Pld.	Avg.
16.	San Luis	44	38	1.1579
17.	UAG	119	108	1.1019
18.	Chiapas	116	108	1.0741
19.	Puebla	115	108	1.0648
20.	Cuernavaca (Note: Cuernavaca inherited the points and games of Celaya.)	114	108	1.0556
