= 2002 CONCACAF Champions' Cup =

37th edition of premier club football tournament organized by CONCACAF

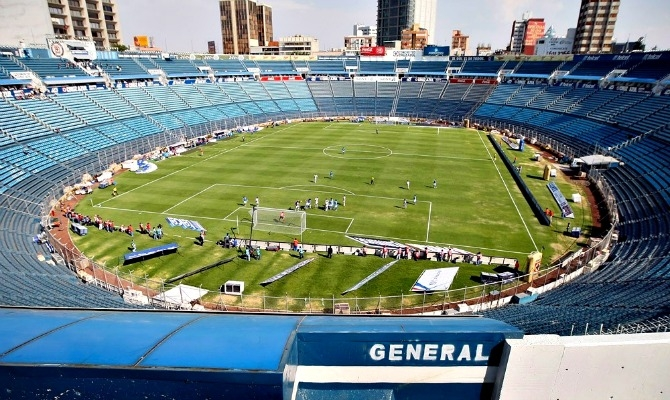
- Estadio Ciudad de los Deportes in Mexico City hosted the Final

Tournament details
- Dates: February 3 – September 18
- Teams: 16 (from 7 associations)

Final positions
- Champions: (Mexico) Pachuca (1st title)
- Runners-up: (Mexico) Morelia

Tournament statistics
- Matches played: 29
- Goals scored: 74 (2.55 per match)
- Top scorer(s): (Brazil) Alex Fernandes (Venezuela) Juan Arango (4 goals)

The 2002 CONCACAF Champions' Cup was the 37th edition of the annual international club football competition held in the CONCACAF region (North America, Central America and the Caribbean), the CONCACAF Champions' Cup. It featured a league format with 16 clubs. As part of the expansion, the quarterfinal stage for the current Champions Cup was moved to the first months of the 2002. Those clubs that had already qualified for the quarterfinal stage of the 2001 CONCACAF Champions' Cup were moved directly into the new league format.

To facilitate the shift to the new cycle of qualifying rounds in the latter half of one year and the league stage in the first half of the following, the decision was taken to use the current competition as the transition period and fold those clubs already qualified into the league format.

In addition, the winner and runner-up of the 2001 CONCACAF Giants Cup (Club América and D.C. United) was also merged into the first edition to provide both of those clubs the opportunity to compete for a spot in the 2003 FIFA Club World Championship, as they would have done under the previous competition system. This was convenient, as one of the qualifying MLS teams, Miami Fusion F.C., was folded after the 2001 season despite winning the MLS Supporters' Shield that year.

Club Comunicaciones, Tauro FC and Alajuelense, were elected as the top Central American non-qualifiers for the 2001 CONCACAF Champions Cup and finally the 2001 MLS Cup champions San Jose Earthquakes and the Mexican 2001 Invierno season champions Pachuca. Originally, four groups of four teams each, to be drawn in December or January, were planned, but at the end of November, CONCACAF changed plans once again and decided to play the tournament in a two-legs knock-out format, without a group stage. Because of this, the tournament's name was changed from CONCACAF Champions League back to CONCACAF Champions Cup.

The two finalists were supposed to qualify for the cancelled 2003 FIFA Club World Championship. Mexican club Pachuca beat countryfellow Morelia 1–0 in the final to win their first CONCACAF trophy.

== Qualified teams ==
=== North American zone ===
(Mexico) Morelia – 2000 Invierno champion
(Mexico) Pachuca – 2001 Invierno champion
(Mexico) Santos Laguna – 2001 Verano champion
(Mexico) Club América – 2001 Giants Cup champion
(United States) Kansas City Wizards – 2000 MLS Cup champion and 2000 MLS Supporters' Shield winner
(United States) Chicago Fire – 2000 MLS Cup runner-up
(United States) San Jose Earthquakes – 2001 MLS Cup champion
(United States) D.C. United – 2001 Giants Cup runner-up

=== Central American zone ===
(Guatemala) Municipal – UNCAF champion
(Costa Rica) Saprissa – UNCAF runner-up
(Honduras) Olimpia – UNCAF third place
(Guatemala) Comunicaciones – UNCAF fourth place
(Panama) Tauro – UNCAF semifinal qualifier
(Costa Rica) Alajuelense – UNCAF semifinal qualifier

=== Caribbean zone ===
(Trinidad and Tobago) Defence Force – 2001 CFU Club Championship finalist
(Trinidad and Tobago) W Connection – 2001 CFU Club Championship finalist

== Bracket ==
First knockout round
1	(Mexico) Morelia	2	1	3
16	(Costa Rica) Saprissa	0	1	1
8	(Guatemala) Municipal	0	0	0
9	(United States) Chicago Fire	1	2	3
5	(Panama) Tauro	1	2	3
12	(Mexico) Santos Laguna	1	4	5
4	(Trinidad and Tobago) W Connection	0	0	0
13	(United States) Kansas City Wizards	1	2	3
6	(Guatemala) Comunicaciones	4	1	5
11	(United States) D.C. United	0	2	2
3	(Costa Rica) Alajuelense	1	2	3
14	(Mexico) Club América	0	0	0
7	(Trinidad and Tobago) Defence Force	1	0	1
10	(Mexico) Pachuca	0	4	4
2	(Honduras) Olimpia	0	1	1
15	(United States) S.J. Earthquakes	1	3	4

Quarter-finals
(Mexico) Morelia	2	1	3
(United States) Chicago Fire	0	2	2
(Mexico) Santos Laguna	2	0	2
(United States) Kansas City Wizards	1	2	3
(Guatemala) Comunicaciones	2	0	2
(Costa Rica) Alajuelense	3	3	6
(Mexico) Pachuca	3	0	3
(United States) S.J. Earthquakes	0	1	1

Semi-finals
(Mexico) Morelia	6	1	7
(United States) Kansas City Wizards	1	1	2
(Costa Rica) Alajuelense	2	0	2
(Mexico) Pachuca	1	2	3

Final
(Mexico) Morelia	0
(Mexico) Pachuca	1

== First round ==
First leg and Second leg matches were played between February 3, 2002, and March 27, 2002.

Team 1	Agg.	Team 2	1st leg	2nd leg
Alajuelense (Costa Rica)	3–0	(Mexico) América	1–0	2–0
Comunicaciones (Guatemala)	5–2	(United States) D.C. United	4–0	1–2
Pachuca (Mexico)	4–1	(Trinidad and Tobago) Defence Force	0–1	4–0
San Jose Earthquakes (United States)	4–1	(Honduras) Olimpia	1–0	3–1
Morelia (Mexico)	3–1	(Costa Rica) Saprissa	2–0	1–1
Municipal (Guatemala)	0–3	(United States) Chicago Fire	0–1	0–2
Tauro (Panama)	3–5	(Mexico) Santos Laguna	1–1	2–4
W Connection (Trinidad and Tobago)	0–3	(United States) Kansas City Wizards	0–1	0–2

LD Alajuelense (Costa Rica)	1–0	(Mexico) Club América

Estadio Alejandro Morera Soto, Alajuela, Costa Rica

Club América (Mexico)	0–2	(Costa Rica) LD Alajuelense

Estadio Plan de San Luis Potosí, San Luis Potosí, Mexico

Alajuelense win 3-0 on aggregate

Comunicaciones (Guatemala)	4–0	(United States) D.C. United

Estadio Doroteo Guamuch Flores, Guatemala City, Guatemala

D.C. United (United States)	2–1	(Guatemala) Comunicaciones

Robert F. Kennedy Memorial Stadium, Washington D.C., United States

Comunicaciones win 5-2 on aggregate

C.F. Pachuca (Mexico)	1–0	(Trinidad and Tobago) Defence Force

Estadio Hidalgo, Hidalgo, Mexico

Defence Force (Trinidad and Tobago)	0–4	(Mexico) C.F. Pachuca

Hasely Crawford Stadium, Port of Spain, Trinidad and Tobago

Pachuca win 5-0 on aggregate

March 13, 2002

San Jose Earthquakes (United States)	1–0	(Honduras) Olimpia
	Report

Miami Orange Bowl, Miami, United States
Attendance: 4,318
March 16, 2002

Olimpia (Honduras)	1–3	(United States) San Jose Earthquakes
	Report

Sheldon-Pleasant Grove Stadium, Sacramento, United States
Attendance: 3,300

San Jose win 4-1 on aggregate

Morelia (Mexico)	2–0	(Costa Rica) Deportivo Saprissa

Estadio Morelos, Morelia, Mexico
March 21, 2003

Deportivo Saprissa (Costa Rica)	1–1	(Mexico) Morelia
Jeaustin Campos		Antonio González

Estadio Ricardo Saprissa, San Juan de Tibás, Costa Rica

Morelia win 3-1 on aggregate

March 16, 2002

C.S.D. Municipal (Guatemala)	0–1	(United States) Chicago Fire

Estadio Doroteo Guamuch Flores, Guatemala City, Guatemala
March 21, 2002

Chicago Fire (United States)	2–0	(Guatemala) C.S.D. Municipal
Carlos Bocanegra; Ante Razov

Cardinal Stadium, Naperville, United States
Attendance: 4,844

Chicago Fire win 3-0 on aggregate

Tauro F.C. (Panama)	1–1	(Mexico) Santos Laguna

Estadio Rommel Fernández, Panama City, Panama

Santos Laguna (Mexico)	4–2	(Panama) Tauro F.C.

Estadio Corona, Torreón, Mexico

Santos win 5-3 on aggregate

March 3, 2002

W Connection (Trinidad and Tobago)	0–1	(United States) Kansas City Wizards

Hasely Crawford Stadium, Port of Spain, Trinidad and Tobago
March 16, 2002

Kansas City Wizards (United States)	2–0	(Trinidad and Tobago) W Connection
	Report

Arrowhead Stadium, Kansas City, United States
Attendance: 4,380

Kansas City win 3-0 on aggregate

== Quarterfinals ==
First leg and Second leg matches were played between April 14, 2002, and April 24, 2002.

Team 1	Agg.	Team 2	1st leg	2nd leg
Comunicaciones (Guatemala)	2–6	(Costa Rica) LD Alajuelense	2–3	0–3
C.F. Pachuca (Mexico)	3–1	(United States) San Jose Earthquakes	3–0	0–1
Morelia (Mexico)	3–2	(United States) Chicago Fire	2–0	1–2
Santos Laguna (Mexico)	2–3	(United States) Kansas City Wizards	2–1	0–2

April 10, 2002

Santos Laguna (Mexico)	2–1	(United States) Kansas City Wizards

Estadio Corona, Torreón, Mexico
April 24, 2002

Kansas City Wizards (United States)	2–0	(Mexico) Santos Laguna
	Report

Arrowhead Stadium, Kansas City
Attendance: 8,086

Kansas City win 3-2 on aggregate

April 14, 2002

Comunicaciones (Guatemala)	2–3	(Costa Rica) LD Alajuelense

Estadio Doroteo Guamuch Flores, Guatemala City, Guatemala
April 24, 2002

LD Alajuelense (Costa Rica)	3–0	(Guatemala) Comunicaciones

Estadio Alejandro Morera Soto, Alajuela, Costa Rica

Alajuelense win 6-2 on aggregate

April 17, 2002

C.F. Pachuca (Mexico)	3–0	(United States) San Jose Earthquakes

Estadio Hidalgo, Pachuca, Mexico
Attendance: 8,000
April 24, 2002

San Jose Earthquakes (United States)	1–0	(Mexico) C.F. Pachuca

Spartan Stadium, San Jose, United States
Attendance: 6,213

Pachuca win 3-1 on aggregate

June 30, 2002

Monarcas Morelia (Mexico)	2–0	(United States) Chicago Fire

Estadio Morelos, Morelia, Mexico
July 10, 2002

Chicago Fire (United States)	2–1	(Mexico) Monarcas Morelia
	Report

Cardinal Stadium, Naperville, United States
Attendance: 11,170

Morelia win 3-2 on aggregate

== Semifinals ==
First leg and Second leg matches were played between August 7, 2002, and August 28, 2002.

Team 1	Agg.	Team 2	1st leg	2nd leg
LD Alajuelense (Costa Rica)	2–3	(Mexico) Pachuca	2–1	0–2
Morelia (Mexico)	7–2	(United States) Kansas City Wizards	6–1	1–1

August 7, 2002

LD Alajuelense (Costa Rica)	2–1	(Mexico) Pachuca
Alfaro 24'; López 48'		Chitiva 3'

Estadio Alejandro Morera Soto, Alajuela
Referee: Nery Alfaro (El Salvador)
August 28, 2002

Pachuca (Mexico)	2–0	(Costa Rica) LD Alajuelense
Santana 32'; Silvani 76'

Estadio Hidalgo, Pachuca

Pachuca won 2–1 on aggregate.

August 7, 2002

Morelia (Mexico)	6–1	(United States) Kansas City Wizards
Fernandes 50', 75', 83' (pen.); Buján 57'; Bautista 62'; Saavedra 73'		Fabbro 85'

Estadio Morelos, Morelia
Referee: Rodrigo Badilla (Costa Rica)
August 28, 2002

Kansas City Wizards (United States)	1–1	(Mexico) Morelia
Brown 68'	Report	Noriega 36' (pen.)

Arrowhead Stadium, Kansas City
Attendance: 7,833
Referee: Michael Seifert (Canada)

Morelia won 7–2 on aggregate.

== Final ==
18 September 2002

Morelia (Mexico)	0–1	(Mexico) Pachuca
	Report	48' Silvani

Estadio Azul, Mexico City
Attendance: 15,000
Referee: Felipe Ramos Rizo (Mexico)

Team details

Morelia
Pachuca

GK	(Mexico) Miguel Fuentes
DF	(Mexico) Omar Trujillo
DF	(Mexico) Heriberto Morales
DF	(Argentina) Darío Franco
DF	(Mexico) Javier Saavedra	(substituted off) 56'
MF	(Mexico) José A. Noriega	(substituted off) 69'
MF	(Argentina) Jorge Almirón
MF	(Mexico) Mario Ruiz
MF	(Mexico) Carlos Morales
FW	(Mexico) Adolfo Bautista	(substituted off) 52'
FW	(Brazil) Alex Fernandes
Substitutions:
MF	(Mexico) Ismael Iñiguez	(substituted in) 52'
FW	(Argentina) Martín Gómez	(substituted in) 56'
MF	(Argentina) Hernán Buján	(substituted in) 69'
Manager:
(Argentina) Rubén Omar Romano

GK	1	(Colombia) Miguel Calero
DF	2	(Mexico) Alberto Rodríguez
DF	5	(Mexico) Francisco de Anda
DF		(Mexico) Jesús López Meneses
DF	25	(Mexico) Marco Sánchez
DF		(Mexico) Manuel Vidrio
MF		(Mexico) Fausto Pinto
MF		(Mexico) Ángel Sosa
MF	11	(Mexico) Cesáreo Victorino
MF		(Colombia) Andrés Chitiva
FW	9	(Argentina) Walter Silvani	(substituted off) 74'
FW		(Mexico) Sergio Santana
Substitutes:
FW		(Venezuela) Juan Arango	(substituted in) 74'
Manager:
(Mexico) Alfredo Tena

== Top scorers ==
Rank	Player	Club	Goals
1	(Mexico) Alex Fernandes	(Mexico) Morelia	4
1	(Venezuela) Juan Arango	(Mexico) C.F. Pachuca	4
3	(Ukraine) Dema Kovalenko	(United States) Chicago Fire	3
3	(Honduras) Milton Núñez	(Guatemala) Comunicaciones	3
3	(Mexico) Eduardo Lillingston	(Mexico) Santos Laguna	3
6	Pedro Jiménez	(Mexico) Santos Laguna	2
6	(Costa Rica) Sandro Alfaro	(Costa Rica) LD Alajuelense	2
6	Erick Jimenez	(Costa Rica) LD Alajuelense	2
6	(United States) Chris Brown	(United States) Kansas City Wizards	2
6	(Costa Rica) Wilmer Lopez	(Costa Rica) LD Alajuelense	2
6	Franz Torres	(Mexico) Morelia	2
6	Antonio Gonzalez	(Mexico) Morelia	2
6	(Colombia) Andrés Chitiva	(Mexico) C.F. Pachuca	2
6	(Mexico) Sergio Santana	(Mexico) C.F. Pachuca	2
6	(Argentina) Walter Silvani	(Mexico) C.F. Pachuca	2
