= Primera División de México Apertura 2002 =

Primera División de México
- Season: 2002−03
- Champions: Toluca (7th title)
- Champions' Cup: Toluca; Morelia
- Copa Libertadores: UNAM; Cruz Azul
- Top goalscorer: José Cardozo (29 goals)

Primera División de México (Mexican First Division) Apertura 2002 is a Mexican football tournament - one of two short tournaments that take up the entire year to determine the champion(s) of Mexican football. It began on Saturday, August 3, 2002, and ran until November 24, when the regular season ended. San Luis, Chiapas and Querétaro were promoted to the Primera División de México thus, Léon and La Piedad were relegated to the Primera División A, allowing 20 teams to compete in the Mexican First Division. On December 21, Toluca defeated Morelia and became champions for the seventh time.

== Clubs ==
- The number of participants in the league was expanded to 20 teams.
- La Piedad was moved to Querétaro and was renamed as Gallos Blancos de Querétaro.
- Veracruz was promoted from Primera 'A', however, another team with the same name and venue already existed, so the promoted team was moved to Tuxtla Gutiérrez and was renamed as Jaguares de Chiapas.
- San Luis was promoted from Primera 'A'.
- Atlante F.C. was moved from Mexico City to Ciudad Nezahualcóyotl.

=== Stadiums and Locations ===
Location of the Primera División Apertura 2002 teams

Team	Location	Stadium	Capacity
América	Mexico City	Estadio Azteca	87,523
Atlante	Ciudad Nezahualcóyotl, State of Mexico	Estadio Neza 86	20,000
Atlas	Guadalajara, Jalisco	Estadio Jalisco	55,110
Celaya	Celaya, Guanajuato	Estadio Miguel Alemán Valdés	23,182
Chiapas	Tuxtla Gutiérrez, Chiapas	Estadio Víctor Manuel Reyna	29,001
Cruz Azul	Mexico City	Estadio Azul	33,000
Guadalajara	Guadalajara, Jalisco	Estadio Jalisco	55,110
Monterrey	Monterrey, Nuevo León	Estadio Tecnológico	36,485
Morelia	Morelia, Michoacán	Estadio Morelos	35,000
Necaxa	Mexico City	Estadio Azteca	87,523
Pachuca	Pachuca, Hidalgo	Estadio Hidalgo	27,512
Puebla	Puebla City, Puebla	Estadio Cuauhtémoc	42,649
Querétaro	Querétaro City, Querétaro	Estadio Corregidora	33,162
San Luis	San Luis Potosí City, San Luis Potosí	Estadio Alfonso Lastras	30,000
Santos Laguna	Torreón, Coahuila	Estadio Corona	20,100
Toluca	Toluca, State of Mexico	Estadio Nemesio Díez	27,000
UAG	Zapopan, Jalisco	Estadio Tres de Marzo	18,779
UANL	San Nicolás de los Garza, Nuevo León	Estadio Universitario	72,000
UNAM	Mexico City	Estadio Olímpico Universitario	41,615
Veracruz	Boca del Río, Veracruz	Estadio Luis "Pirata" Fuente	28,703

=== Personnel and kits ===
Team	Manager	Captain	Kit manufacturer	Shirt sponsor
América	(Mexico) Mario Carrillo	(Mexico) Pável Pardo	Nike	Coca-Cola
Atlante	(Mexico) Miguel Herrera	(Argentina) Damián Grosso	Garcis	Pegaso
Atlas	(Mexico) Enrique Meza		Nike	Coca-Cola/Omnilife
Celaya	(Bolivia) Carlos Trucco		Keuka	Lala
Chiapas	(Argentina) Salvador Capitano	(Mexico) Sergio Almaguer	Atletica	Farmacias del Ahorro
Cruz Azul	(Mexico) José Luis Trejo	(Mexico) Óscar Pérez	Umbro	Cemento Cruz Azul
Guadalajara	(Mexico) Daniel Guzmán		Atletica	Cemento Tolteca
Monterrey	(Argentina) Daniel Passarella	(Mexico) Jesús Arellano	Atletica	Bimbo
Morelia	(Argentina) Rubén Omar Romano	(Argentina) Darío Franco	Atletica	LG
Necaxa	(Mexico) Raúl Arias		Atletica	Bimbo
Pachuca	(Mexico) Alfredo Tena		Atletica	Cemento Cruz Azul
Puebla	(Mexico) Gustavo Vargas		Atletica	Volkswagen
Querétaro	(Argentina) Mario Zanabria		Marval	Kellogg's
San Luis	(Mexico) Juan Antonio Luna		Atletica	Bimbo
Santos Laguna	(Mexico) Sergio Bueno	(Mexico) Jared Borgetti	Atletica	Soriana
Toluca	(Argentina) Ricardo La Volpe	(Mexico) Salvador Carmona	Atletica	Banamex
UAG	(Peru) Julio César Uribe		Atletica	Ocho Columnas
UANL	(Brazil) Ricardo Ferretti		Atletica	Cemento Monterrey
UNAM	(Mexico) Hugo Sánchez		Lotto	Banamex
Veracruz	(Uruguay) Hugo Fernández		Spalding	Gigante

== Regular phase ==
Group 1
Pos	Team	Pld	W	D	L	GF	GA	GD	Pts	Qualification
1	América	19	13	4	2	34	14	+20	43	Directly qualified to the Liguilla (Playoffs)
2	Toluca	19	12	5	2	55	25	+30	41	Directly qualified to the Liguilla (Playoffs)
3	Atlas	19	7	1	11	28	31	−3	22	
4	Puebla	19	6	4	9	23	29	−6	22	
5	Celaya	19	5	6	8	24	32	−8	21	

Source: MedioTiempo

Group 2
Pos	Team	Pld	W	D	L	GF	GA	GD	Pts	Qualification
1	UNAM	19	10	3	6	39	35	+4	33	Directly qualified to the Liguilla (Playoffs)
2	UAG	19	8	5	6	26	29	−3	29	Directly qualified to the Liguilla (Playoffs)
3	UANL	19	6	5	8	32	33	−1	23	
4	Monterrey	19	5	7	7	18	20	−2	22	
5	Pachuca	19	2	9	8	21	35	−14	15	

Source: MedioTiempo

Group 3
Pos	Team	Pld	W	D	L	GF	GA	GD	Pts	Qualification
1	Morelia	19	9	5	5	35	23	+12	32	Directly qualified to the Liguilla (Playoffs)
2	Cruz Azul	19	7	7	5	30	26	+4	28	Directly qualified to the Liguilla (Playoffs)
3	Necaxa	19	8	2	9	28	32	−4	26	
4	San Luis	19	6	6	7	31	28	+3	24	
5	Chiapas	19	3	7	9	19	34	−15	16	

Source: MedioTiempo

Group 4
Pos	Team	Pld	W	D	L	GF	GA	GD	Pts	Qualification
1	Guadalajara	19	6	9	4	28	29	−1	27	Directly qualified to the Liguilla (Playoffs)
2	Santos Laguna	19	7	5	7	30	28	+2	26	Directly qualified to the Liguilla (Playoffs)
3	Atlante	19	6	7	6	31	33	−2	25	
4	Querétaro	19	6	5	8	28	34	−6	23	
5	Veracruz	19	4	6	9	30	40	−10	18	

Source: MedioTiempo

== League table ==
Pos	Team	Pld	W	D	L	GF	GA	GD	Pts	Qualification
1	América	19	13	4	2	34	14	+20	43	Directly qualified to the Liguilla (Playoffs)
2	Toluca	19	12	5	2	55	25	+30	41	Directly qualified to the Liguilla (Playoffs)
3	Pumas UNAM	19	10	3	6	39	35	+4	33	Directly qualified to the Liguilla (Playoffs)
4	Morelia	19	9	5	5	35	23	+12	32	Directly qualified to the Liguilla (Playoffs)
5	UAG	19	8	5	6	26	29	−3	29	Directly qualified to the Liguilla (Playoffs)
6	Cruz Azul	19	7	7	5	30	26	+4	28	Directly qualified to the Liguilla (Playoffs)
7	Guadalajara	19	6	9	4	28	29	−1	27	Directly qualified to the Liguilla (Playoffs)
8	Santos Laguna	19	7	5	7	30	28	+2	26	Directly qualified to the Liguilla (Playoffs)
9	Necaxa	19	8	2	9	28	32	−4	26	
10	Atlante	19	6	7	6	31	33	−2	25	
11	San Luis	19	6	6	7	31	28	+3	24	
12	Tigres UANL	19	6	5	8	32	33	−1	23	
13	Querétaro	19	6	5	8	28	34	−6	23	
14	Monterrey	19	5	7	7	18	20	−2	22	
15	Atlas	19	7	1	11	28	31	−3	22	
16	Puebla	19	6	4	9	23	29	−6	22	
17	Celaya	19	5	6	8	24	32	−8	21	
18	Veracruz	19	4	6	9	30	40	−10	18	
19	Chiapas	19	3	7	9	19	34	−15	16	
20	Pachuca	19	2	9	8	21	35	−14	15	

Source: MedioTiempo

== Results ==
Home \ Away	AME	ATE	ATS	CEL	CHI	CAZ	GDL	MTY	MOR	NEC	PAC	PUE	QRO	SNL	SAN	TOL	UAG	UNL	UNM	VER
América	—	–	–	–	0–0	–	–	–	1–1	2–1	3–0	–	3–1	2–1	–	1–2	2–1	–	–	5–1
Atlante	1–4	—	–	4–2	–	2–0	0–0	–	2–1	–	–	–	2–1	–	3–1	2–3	–	2–2	–	4–1
Atlas	3–2	2–1	—	–	–	3–2	1–2	1–2	–	–	–	–	2–5	–	1–2	–	–	1–0	6–0	–
Celaya	0–1	–	2–1	—	2–2	–	–	1–0	1–1	–	–	0–3	2–0	–	–	2–2	–	–	0–1	1–1
Chiapas	–	1–1	1–2		—	1–2	1–1	0–0	–	–	–	2–0	–	–	2–0	–	–	1–3	0–2	–
Cruz Azul	1–1	–	–	1–1	–	—	–	–	1–3	2–1	3–2	–	1–1	0–1	–	1–1	1–2	–	–	5–1
Guadalajara	0–1	–	–	3–2	–	1–1	—	–	1–0	0–0	–	–	2–4	1–1	–	3–3	–	4–0	–	2–1
Monterrey	0–0	2–0	–	–	–	1–1	0–2	—	–	–	–	–	2–0	–	0–0	3–1	–	1–1	1–2	–
Morelia	–	–	2–0	–	2–0	–	–	2–0	—	6–0	1–1	2–0	–	3–2	–	–	1–0	–	2–2	–
Necaxa	–	3–0	2–3	0–2	3–1	–	–	2–1	–	—	0–2	2–0	–	3–2	–	–	1–1	–	1–0	–
Pachuca	–	1–1	1–1	0–2	–	–	1–1	1–3	–	–	—	1–1	3–3	–	0–0	–	0–2	–	0–3	–
Puebla	0–1	1–1	2–1	–	–	1–2	1–1	2–1	–	–	–	—	–	–	3–1	–	–	2–1	0–1	–
Querétaro	–	–	–	–	3–3	–	–	–	1–0	1–3	2–1	1–3	—	0–0	–	0–2	2–0	–	–	3–2
San Luis	–	2–2	1–0	1–1	0–1	–	–	3–0	–	–	2–4	1–0		—	1–1	–	0–0	–	–	–
Santos Laguna	0–1	–	–	2–0	0–0	1–3	4–2	–	2–2	3–2	–	–	–	–	—	5–2	–	3–1	–	4–2
Toluca	–	–	1–0	–	5–1	–	–	–	4–1	3–0	5–1	5–0	–	3–1	–	—	6–0	–	–	1–1
UAG	–	2–2	1–0	3–2	2–0	–	1–1	0–0	–	–	–	3–2	–	–	2–1	–	—	1–3	4–3	–
UANL	0–1	–	–	6–1	–	0–1	–	–	2–1	3–2	1–1	–	4–1	0–4	–	2–2	–	—	–	1–1
UNAM	1–3	4–1	–	–	–	2–2	7–1	–	–	–	–	–	1–1	–	1–0	1–4	–	3–2	—	2–1
Veracruz	–	–	3–0	–	3–0	–	–	1–1	3–4	0–2	1–1	2–2	–	3–1	–	–	2–1	–	–	—

Updated to match(es) played on 24 November 2002. Source: RSSSF
Legend: Blue = home team win; Yellow = draw; Red = away team win.

== Top goalscorers ==
Players sorted first by goals scored, then by last name. Only regular season goals listed.

Rank	Player	Club	Goals
1	(Paraguay) José Cardozo	Toluca	29
2	(Mexico) Jared Borgetti	Santos Laguna	13
2	(Chile) Sebastián González	Atlante	13
2	(Brazil) Alex Fernandes	Morelia	13
5	(Brazil) Marcelo de Faria	San Luis	12
6	(Mexico) Jesús Olalde	UNAM	10
7	(Chile) Reinaldo Navia	UAG	9
8	(Mexico) Cuauhtémoc Blanco	América	8
8	(Argentina) Diego Latorre	Celaya	8
8	(Argentina) Josemir Lujambio	Querétaro	8
8	(Mexico) Mariano Trujillo	UNAM	8

Source: MedioTiempo

== Final phase (Liguilla) ==
=== Bracket ===
Quarterfinals
2	Toluca	1	3	4
7	Guadalajara	2	0	2
1	América	3	1	4
8	Santos Laguna	3	2	5
3	UNAM	0	3	3
6	Cruz Azul	0	2	2
4	Morelia	3	4	7
5	UAG	1	1	2

Semifinals
2	Toluca	5	2	7
8	Santos Laguna	3	1	4
3	UNAM	0	2	2
4	Morelia	4	1	5

Finals
2	Toluca	0	4	4
4	Morelia	1	1	2

=== Quarterfinals ===
December 4, 2002
20:45

Guadalajara	2–1	Toluca
García 85'; Mora 88'	Report	Cardozo 56'

Estadio Jalisco, Guadalajara
Referee: Germán Arredondo Ramírez (Guanajuato)
December 7, 2002
15:00

Toluca	3–0	Guadalajara
Carmona 74'; Cardozo 77'; Sánchez 90'	Report

Estadio Nemesio Díez, Toluca
Referee: Gilberto Alcalá Pineda (Mexico City)

Toluca won 4–2 on aggregate.

December 5, 2002
15:00

Santos Laguna	3–3	América
Ruiz 30', 64'; Lillingston 60'	Report	Blanco 33'; Castillo 38', 70'

Estadio Corona, Torreón
Referee: Armando Archundia (Estado de México)
December 8, 2002
16:00

América	1–2	Santos Laguna
Blanco 70' (pen.)	Report	Borgetti 40'; Villa 63' (o.g.)

Estadio Azteca, Mexico City
Referee: Antonio Marrufo (Chihuahua)

Santos Laguna won 5–4 on aggregate.

December 4, 2002
18:00

Cruz Azul	0–0	UNAM
	Report

Estadio Azul, Mexico City
Referee: Eduardo Brizio Carter (Mexico City)
December 8, 2002
12:00

UNAM	3–2	Cruz Azul
González 14', 41'; Brown 78' (o.g.)	Report	Abreu 50'; Cabrera 83'

Estadio Olímpico Universitario, Mexico City
Referee: Felipe Ramos Rizo (Mexico City)

UNAM won 3–2 on aggregate.

December 4, 2002
16:00

UAG	1–3	Morelia
Donizete 35'	Report	Almirón 7'; C. Morales 65'; González 79'

Estadio Tres de Marzo, Zapopan
Referee: Sergio Fernando Silva (Coahuila)
December 7, 2002
20:00

Morelia	4–1	UAG
Alex 21'; Saavedra 62'; Bautista 74'; Buján 83'	Report	Donizete 26'

Estadio Morelos, Morelia
Referee: José Abramo Lira (Nuevo León)

Morelia won 7–2 on aggregate.

=== Semifinals ===
December 11, 2002
15:00

Santos Laguna	3–5	Toluca
Borgetti 18'; Rodríguez 47'; Altamirano 55'	Report	Cardozo 22' (pen.), 32'; Sánchez 42'; Cuberas 70'; Sinha 71'

Estadio Corona, Torreón
Referee: Antonio Marrufo (Chihuahua)
December 14, 2002
15:00

Toluca	2–1	Santos Laguna
Cardozo 32', 82'	Report	Borgetti 28'

Estadio Nemesio Díez, Toluca
Referee: Armando Archundia (Estado de México)

Toluca won 7–4 on aggregate.

December 12, 2002
20:00

Morelia	4–0	UNAM
Bautista 14', 55'; Saavedra 29'; Alex 44'	Report

Estadio Morelos, Morelia
Referee: Eduardo Brizio Carter (Mexico City)
December 15, 2002
12:00

UNAM	2–1	Morelia
Lemos 30'; González 44'	Report	Bautista 39'

Estadio Olímpico Universitario, Mexico City
Referee: Felipe Ramos Rizo (Mexico City)

Morelia won 5–2 on aggregate.

=== Finals ===
December 18, 2002
20:00

Morelia	1–0	Toluca
Saavedra 58'	Report

Estadio Morelos, Morelia
Referee: Eduardo Brizio Carter (Mexico City)

First leg

Morelia:
GK	30	(Mexico) Moisés Muñoz
DF	58	(Argentina) Darío Franco
DF	5	(Mexico) Heriberto Morales	(yellow card) 82'
DF	3	(Mexico) Omar Rodríguez		(substituted off) 64'
DF	27	(Mexico) Omar Trujillo
MF	23	(Mexico) Javier Saavedra
MF	17	(Mexico) José Antonio Noriega		(substituted off) 55'
MF	8	(Argentina) Jorge Almirón	(yellow card) 77'
MF	28	(Mexico) Carlos Adrián Morales		(substituted off) 73'
MF	10	(Mexico) Adolfo Bautista
FW	9	(Brazil) Alex Fernandes	(yellow card) 64'
Substitutions:
GK	1	(Mexico) Miguel Fuentes
DF	4	(Mexico) Carlos González		(substituted on) 64'
DF	13	(Mexico) Miguel Hernández
MF	18	(Argentina) Hernán Buján		(substituted on) 73'
MF	20	(Mexico) Ismael Íñiguez		(substituted on) 55'
MF	22	(Mexico) Javier Lozano
FW	7	(Mexico) Antonio González
Manager:
(Argentina) Rubén Omar Romano

Toluca:
GK	1	(Argentina) Hernán Cristante
DF	7	(Mexico) Salvador Carmona
DF	3	(Argentina) Maximiliano Cuberas
DF	18	(Mexico) José Manuel Cruzalta		(substituted off) 64'
MF	5	(Mexico) Israel López
MF	6	(Mexico) Octavio Valdez
MF	23	(Mexico) Erik Espinosa
MF	8	(Mexico) Rafael García	(yellow card) 35'
MF	10	(Brazil) Sinha		(substituted off) 89'
MF	11	(Uruguay) Vicente Sánchez
FW	9	(Paraguay) José Cardozo
Substitutions:
GK	30	(Mexico) Mario Albarrán
DF	2	(Mexico) Christian Ramírez
DF	14	(Argentina) Ariel Franco		(substituted on) 64'
MF	16	(Mexico) Miguel Almazán
MF	19	(Mexico) Sergio Ponce
MF	37	(Mexico) Josué Castillejos
FW	28	(Mexico) Édgar González		(substituted on) 89'
Manager:
(Argentina) Alberto Jorge

Second leg

December 21, 2002
15:00

Toluca	4–1	Morelia
Carmona 32'; López 40'; Cardozo 51'; García 65'	Report	Bautista 1'

Estadio Nemesio Díez, Toluca
Referee: Felipe Ramos Rizo (Mexico City)

Toluca won 4–2 on aggregate.

Toluca:
GK	1	(Argentina) Hernán Cristante
DF	7	(Mexico) Salvador Carmona
DF	3	(Argentina) Maximiliano Cuberas
DF	18	(Mexico) José Manuel Cruzalta
MF	5	(Mexico) Israel López	(yellow card) 24'
MF	6	(Mexico) Octavio Valdez
MF	23	(Mexico) Erik Espinosa
MF	8	(Mexico) Rafael García
MF	10	(Brazil) Sinha		(substituted off) 76'
MF	11	(Uruguay) Vicente Sánchez		(substituted off) 86'
FW	9	(Paraguay) José Cardozo
Substitutions:
GK	30	(Mexico) Mario Albarrán
DF	2	(Mexico) Christian Ramírez
DF	14	(Argentina) Ariel Franco	(yellow card) 88'	(substituted on) 86'
MF	16	(Mexico) Miguel Almazán
MF	19	(Mexico) Sergio Ponce		(substituted on) 76'
MF	37	(Mexico) Josué Castillejos
FW	28	(Mexico) Édgar González
Manager:
(Argentina) Alberto Jorge

Morelia:
GK	30	(Mexico) Moisés Muñoz
DF	58	(Argentina) Darío Franco	(yellow card) 67'
DF	5	(Mexico) Heriberto Morales	(yellow card) 88'
DF	3	(Mexico) Omar Rodríguez
DF	27	(Mexico) Omar Trujillo	(yellow card) 54'
MF	23	(Mexico) Javier Saavedra
MF	17	(Mexico) José Antonio Noriega		(substituted off) 53'
MF	8	(Argentina) Jorge Almirón	(yellow card) 28'
MF	28	(Mexico) Carlos Adrián Morales		(substituted off) 70'
MF	10	(Mexico) Adolfo Bautista
FW	9	(Brazil) Alex Fernandes		(substituted off) 62'
Substitutions:
GK	1	(Mexico) Miguel Fuentes
DF	4	(Mexico) Carlos González
DF	13	(Mexico) Miguel Hernández
MF	18	(Argentina) Hernán Buján		(substituted on) 70'
MF	20	(Mexico) Ismael Íñiguez		(substituted on) 53'
MF	22	(Mexico) Javier Lozano
FW	7	(Mexico) Antonio González		(substituted on) 62'
Manager:
(Argentina) Rubén Omar Romano

Champions

7th title
