= 2002 in American soccer =

Soccer in the United States
- Season: 2002

The 2002 season was the 90th year of competitive soccer in the United States.

== National team ==
=== Record ===
Competition	GP	W	D	L	GF	GA
2002 FIFA World Cup	5	2	1	2	7	7
2002 CONCACAF Gold Cup	5	5	0	0	9	1
International Friendly	10	6	0	4	18	10
Total	20	13	1	6	34	18

=== Results ===
The home team or the team that is designated as the home team is listed in the left column; the away team is in the right column.

Win Draw Loss

January 19 Gold Cup Group Stage	United States	2 – 1	South Korea	Pasadena, California
	Donovan 35'; Beasley 90+2'	(Report)	Song 38'	Stadium: Rose Bowl; Attendance: 42,117; Referee: Samuel Richard (Dominican Republic)

January 21 Gold Cup Group Stage	Cuba	0 – 1	United States	Pasadena, California
18:00 UTC−08		(Report)	McBride 22' (pen.)	Stadium: Rose Bowl; Attendance: 31,244; Referee: Jose Pineda (Honduras)

January 27 Gold Cup Quarterfinal	United States	4 – 0	El Salvador	Pasadena, California
15:00 UTC−08	McBride 9', 11', 21'; Razov 72'	(Report)		Stadium: Rose Bowl; Attendance: 31,628; Referee: Samuel Richard (Dominican Republic)

January 30 Gold Cup Semifinal	Canada	0 – 0 (a.e.t.) (2 – 4 p)	United States	Pasadena, California
20:30 UTC−08		(Report)		Stadium: Rose Bowl; Attendance: 7,241; Referee: Peter Prendergast (Jamaica)
	Penalties
	McKenna (penalty missed); Stalteri (penalty scored); De Rosario (penalty scored); Nsaliwa (penalty missed)		Donovan (penalty scored); McBride (penalty scored); Agoos (penalty scored); Mathis (penalty scored)

February 2 Gold Cup Final	United States	2 – 0	Costa Rica	Pasadena, California
12:00 UTC−08	Wolff 37'; Agoos 63'	(Report)		Stadium: Rose Bowl; Attendance: 14,432; Referee: Carlos Batres (Guatemala)

February 13 International Friendly	Italy	1 – 0	United States	Catania, Italy
20:45 UTC+01	Del Piero 62'	(Report)		Stadium: Stadio Cibali; Attendance: 25,493; Referee: Joseph Attard (Malta)

March 2 International Friendly	United States	4 – 0	Honduras	Seattle
13:00 UTC−08	Mathis 14', 59'; Donovan 44', 67'	(Report)		Stadium: SAFECO Field; Attendance: 38,534; Referee: Jerry Proctor (Canada)

March 10 International Friendly	United States	1 – 0	Ecuador	Birmingham, Alabama
15:00 UTC−06	Lewis 21'	(Report)		Stadium: Legion Field; Attendance: 38,534; Referee: Jerry Proctor (Canada)

March 27 International Friendly	Germany	4 – 2	United States	Rostock, Germany
20:45 UTC+01	Ziege 44'; Neuville 61'; Bierhoff 65'; Frings 68'	(Report)	Mathis 17', 71'	Stadium: Ostseestadion; Attendance: 29,000; Referee: Berhard Brutger (Austria)

April 3 International Friendly	United States	1 – 0	Mexico	Denver, Colorado
20:00 UTC−07	Mathis 66'	(Report)		Stadium: Invesco Field at Mile High; Attendance: 48,476; Referee: Clive Wright (Jamaica)

April 17 International Friendly	Republic of Ireland	2 – 1	United States	Dublin, Ireland
19:30 GMT	Kinsella 7'; Doherty 83'	(Report)	Pope 34'	Stadium: Lansdowne Road; Attendance: 39,000; Referee: Philippe Leuba (Switzerland)

May 12 International Friendly	United States	2 – 1	Uruguay	Washington, D.C.
14:00 UTC−04	Sanneh 6'; Beasley 40'	(Report)	Abreu 60'	Stadium: RFK Stadium; Attendance: 30,413; Referee: Fredy Escobar (Guatemala)

May 16 International Friendly	United States	5 – 0	Jamaica	East Rutherford, New Jersey
19:30 UTC−04	Wolff 32', 60'; Mathis 47'; Donovan 84'; Beasley 90+2'	(Report)		Stadium: Giants Stadium; Attendance: 30,659; Referee: Jose Martinez (Canada)

May 19 International Friendly	United States	0 – 2	Netherlands	Foxborough, Massachusetts
14:00 UTC−04		(Report)	Makaay 45' van der Meyde 76'	Stadium: CMGI Field; Attendance: 36,778; Referee: Benito Archundia (Mexico)

June 5 World Cup Group Stage	United States	3 – 2	Portugal	Suwon, South Korea
18:00 UTC+09	O'Brien 4'; Costa 30' (o.g.); McBride 36'	(Report)	Beto 39'; Agoos 71' (o.g.)	Stadium: Suwon World Cup Stadium; Attendance: 37,306; Referee: Byron Moreno (Ecuador)

June 10 World Cup Group Stage	South Korea	1 – 1	United States	Daegu, South Korea
15:30 UTC+09	Ahn 78'	(Report)	Mathis 24'	Stadium: Daegu World Cup Stadium; Attendance: 60,778; Referee: Urs Meier (Switzerland)

June 14 World Cup Group Stage	Poland	3 – 1	United States	Daejeon, South Korea
20:30 UTC+09	Olisadebe 3'; Kryszalowicz 5'; Żewłakow 66'	(Report)	Donovan 83'	Stadium: Daejeon World Cup Stadium; Attendance: 26,482; Referee: Jun Lu (China)

June 17 World Cup Round of 16	Mexico	0 – 2	United States	Jeonju, South Korea
15:30 UTC+09		(Report)	McBride 8'; Donovan 83'	Stadium: Jeonju World Cup Stadium; Attendance: 36,380; Referee: Vítor Melo Pereira (Portugal)

June 21 World Cup Quarterfinal	Germany	1 – 0	United States	Ulsan, South Korea
20:30 UTC+09	Ballack 39'	(Report)		Stadium: Ulsan Munsu Football Stadium; Attendance: 37,337; Referee: Hugh Dallas (Scotland)

November 17 International Friendly	United States	2 – 0	El Salvador	Washington, D.C.
15:00 UTC−05	Olsen 31'; Victorine 60'	(Report)		Stadium: RFK Stadium; Attendance: 13,590; Referee: Peter Prendergast (Jamaica)

=== Goalscorers ===
Player	Goals
Clint Mathis	7
Landon Donovan	6
Brian McBride	6
Josh Wolff	3
DaMarcus Beasley	3
Ben Olsen	1
Sasha Victorine	1
Eddie Lewis	1
Ante Razov	1
Jeff Agoos	1
Eddie Pope	1
Tony Sanneh	1
John O'Brien	1

== Major League Soccer ==
=== Standings ===
Eastern Conference	GP	W	L	D	GF	GA	GD	Pts
y – New England Revolution	28	12	14	2	49	49	0	38
x – Columbus Crew	28	11	12	5	44	43	1	38
x – Chicago Fire	28	11	13	4	43	38	5	37
MetroStars	28	11	15	2	41	47	-6	35
D.C. United	28	9	14	5	31	40	-9	32

Western Conference	GP*	W	L	D	GF	GA	GD	Pts
s – Los Angeles Galaxy	28	16	9	3	44	33	11	51
x – San Jose Earthquakes	28	14	11	3	45	35	10	45
x – Dallas Burn	28	12	9	7	44	43	1	43
x – Colorado Rapids	28	13	11	4	43	48	-5	43
x – Kansas City Wizards	28	9	10	9	37	45	-8	36

- Top eight teams with the highest points clinch play-off berth, regardless of conference.
  x = Playoff berth
  y = Conference Winner (Season)
  s = Supporters Shield/Conference winner (Season)
- New England Revolution wins first tiebreaker vs. Columbus Crew (head-to-head: 2-1-1)
  Dallas Burn wins first tiebreaker vs. Colorado Rapids (head-to-head: 2-1-1)

=== Playoffs ===
Playoff bracket

Conference Semifinals
Los Angeles Galaxy (ASDET)* (6 Points)	3*	1	5
Kansas City Wizards (3 Points)	2	4	2
Dallas Burn (4 Points)	4	0	1
Colorado Rapids (SDET)** (4 Points)	2	1	1**
New England Revolution (6 Points)	2	1	2
Chicago Fire (3 Points)	0	2	0
San Jose Earthquakes (0 Points)	1	1	x
Columbus Crew (6 Points)	2	2	x

Conference Finals
Los Angeles Galaxy (6 Points)	4	1	x
Colorado Rapids (0 Points)	0	0	x
New England Revolution (5 Points)	0	1	2
Columbus Crew (2 Points)	0	0	2

MLS Cup 2002
Los Angeles Galaxy (ASDET)*	1*
New England Revolution	0

- Points system
  Win = 3 Pts.
  Loss = 0 Pts.
  Draw = 1 Pt.
- ASDET*=Added Sudden Death Extra Time (Game tie breaker)
  SDET**=Sudden Death Extra Time (Series tie breaker)
  Teams will advance at 5 points.

=== MLS Cup ===
October 20

New England Revolution	0 – 1 (asdet)	Los Angeles Galaxy
		Ruiz 113'

Gillette Stadium, Foxborough, Massachusetts
Attendance: 61,316
Referee: Kevin Terry

== Lamar Hunt U.S. Open Cup ==
=== Bracket ===
Home teams listed on top of bracket

Second round
D3	South Jersey	0
A-L	Hampton Roads	1
PDL	Raleigh	0
A-L	Richmond	3
A-L	Milwaukee	4
D3	New York	0
A-L	Rochester (ASDET)	3
PDL	Des Moines	2
D3	Utah	1
A-L	Seattle	2
A-L	Minnesota	6
PDL	San Diego	1
A-L	Atlanta	2
PDL	Memphis	0
D3	Greenville	0
A-L	Charleston	3

Third round
A-L	Hampton Roads	0
MLS	MetroStars	1
MLS	Columbus	3
A-L	Richmond	0
A-L	Milwaukee	1
MLS	Chicago	0
A-L	Rochester (ASDET)	2
MLS	Kansas City	3
A-L	Seattle	3
MLS	San Jose (ASDET)	4
A-L	Minnesota	0
MLS	Los Angeles	4
A-L	Atlanta	1
MLS	Dallas (ASDET)	2
A-L	Charleston	0
MLS	Colorado (ASDET)	1

Quarterfinals
MLS	MetroStars	1
MLS	Columbus	2
A-L	Milwaukee	0
MLS	Kansas City	2
MLS	San Jose	0
MLS	Los Angeles (ASDET)	1
MLS	Dallas (ASDET)	1
MLS	Colorado	0

Semifinals
MLS	Columbus (ASDET)	3
MLS	Kansas City	2
MLS	Los Angeles	4
MLS	Dallas	1

Finals
MLS	Columbus	1
MLS	Los Angeles	0

=== Final ===
October 24

Columbus Crew	1 – 0	Los Angeles Galaxy
García 30'	(Report)

Columbus Crew Stadium, Columbus, Ohio
Attendance: 6,054

== American clubs in international competitions ==
Club	Competition	Final round
Kansas City Wizards	2002 CONCACAF Champions' Cup	Semifinals
Chicago Fire	2002 CONCACAF Champions' Cup	Quarterfinals
San Jose Earthquakes	2002 CONCACAF Champions' Cup	Quarterfinals
D.C. United	2002 CONCACAF Champions' Cup	First Round

=== Kansas City Wizards ===
March 3 Champions Cup First Round	W Connection (Trinidad and Tobago)	0 – 1	(United States) Kansas City Wizards	Marabella, Trinidad & Tobago
			Gomez 85'	Stadium: Manny Ramjohn Stadium

March 16 Champions Cup First Round	Kansas City Wizards (United States)	2 – 0	(Trinidad and Tobago) W Connection	Kansas City, Missouri
	Burns 50'; Preki 53'			Stadium: Arrowhead Stadium

April 10 Champions Cup Quarterfinal	Santos Laguna (Mexico)	2 – 1	(United States) Kansas City Wizards	Torreón, Mexico
	Lillingston 2', 35'		Glasgow 81'	Stadium: Estadio Corona

April 24 Champions Cup Quarterfinal	Kansas City Wizards (United States)	2 – 0	(Mexico) Santos Laguna	Kansas City, Missouri
	Talley 33'; Brown 71'		Glasgow 81'	Stadium: Arrowhead Stadium

August 7 Champions Cup Semifinal	Monarcas Morelia (Mexico)	6 – 1	(United States) Kansas City Wizards	Morelia, Mexico
	Alex 50', 75', 83' (pen.); 57'; Bautista 62'; Saavedra 73'		Fabbro 85'	Stadium: Estadio Morelos

August 28 Champions Cup Semifinal	Kansas City Wizards (United States)	1 – 1	(Mexico) Monarcas Morelia	Kansas City, Missouri
	Brown 68'		Noriega 36' (pen.)	Stadium: Arrowhead Stadium

=== Chicago Fire ===
March 16 Champions Cup First Round	Municipal (Guatemala)	0 – 1	(United States) Chicago Fire	Guatemala City, Guatemala
			Kovalenko 55'	Stadium: Estadio Mateo Flores

March 20 Champions Cup First Round	Chicago Fire (United States)	2 – 0	(Guatemala) Municipal	Naperville, Illinois
			Razov 27'; Bocanegra 82'	Stadium: Cardinal Stadium

June 30 Champions Cup Quarterfinal	Monarcas Morelia (Mexico)	2 – 0	(United States) Chicago Fire	Morelia, Mexico
	Morales 54'; Alex 63'			Stadium: Estadio Morelos

July 10 Champions Cup Quarterfinal	Chicago Fire (United States)	2 – 0	(Mexico) Monarcas Morelia	Naperville, Illinois
	Kovalenko 61', 66'		Gonzalez 41'	Stadium: Cardinal Stadium

=== San Jose Earthquakes ===
March 13 Champions Cup First Round	Olimpia (Honduras)	0 – 1	(United States) San Jose Earthquakes	Miami
	Mulrooney 74'			Stadium: Orange Bowl

March 16 Champions Cup First Round	San Jose Earthquakes (United States)	3 – 1	(Honduras) Olimpia	San Jose, California
	Donovan 32'; Russell 40'; Agoos 68'		Costa 87'	Stadium: Spartan Stadium

April 17 Champions Cup Quarterfinal	Pachuca (Mexico)	3 – 0	(United States) San Jose Earthquakes	Pachuca, Mexico
	Garcés 10'; Santana 54'; Arango 81'			Stadium: Estadio Hidalgo

April 24 Champions Cup Quarterfinal	San Jose Earthquakes (United States)	1 – 0	(Mexico) Pachuca	San Jose, California
	Corrales 61'			Stadium: Spartan Stadium

=== D.C. United ===
March 6 Champions Cup First Round	Comunicaciones (Guatemala)	4 – 0	(United States) D.C. United	Guatemala City, Guatemala
	Núñez 45', 80', 86'; Torlacoff 70'			Stadium: Estadio Cementos Progreso

March 13 Champions Cup First Round	D.C. United (United States)	2 – 1	(Guatemala) Comunicaciones	Washington, D.C.
	Lisi 65'; Pope 89'		Gómez 13'	Stadium: RFK Stadium
