= Cerro del Quinceo =

Mountain in Morelia, Michoacán, Mexico

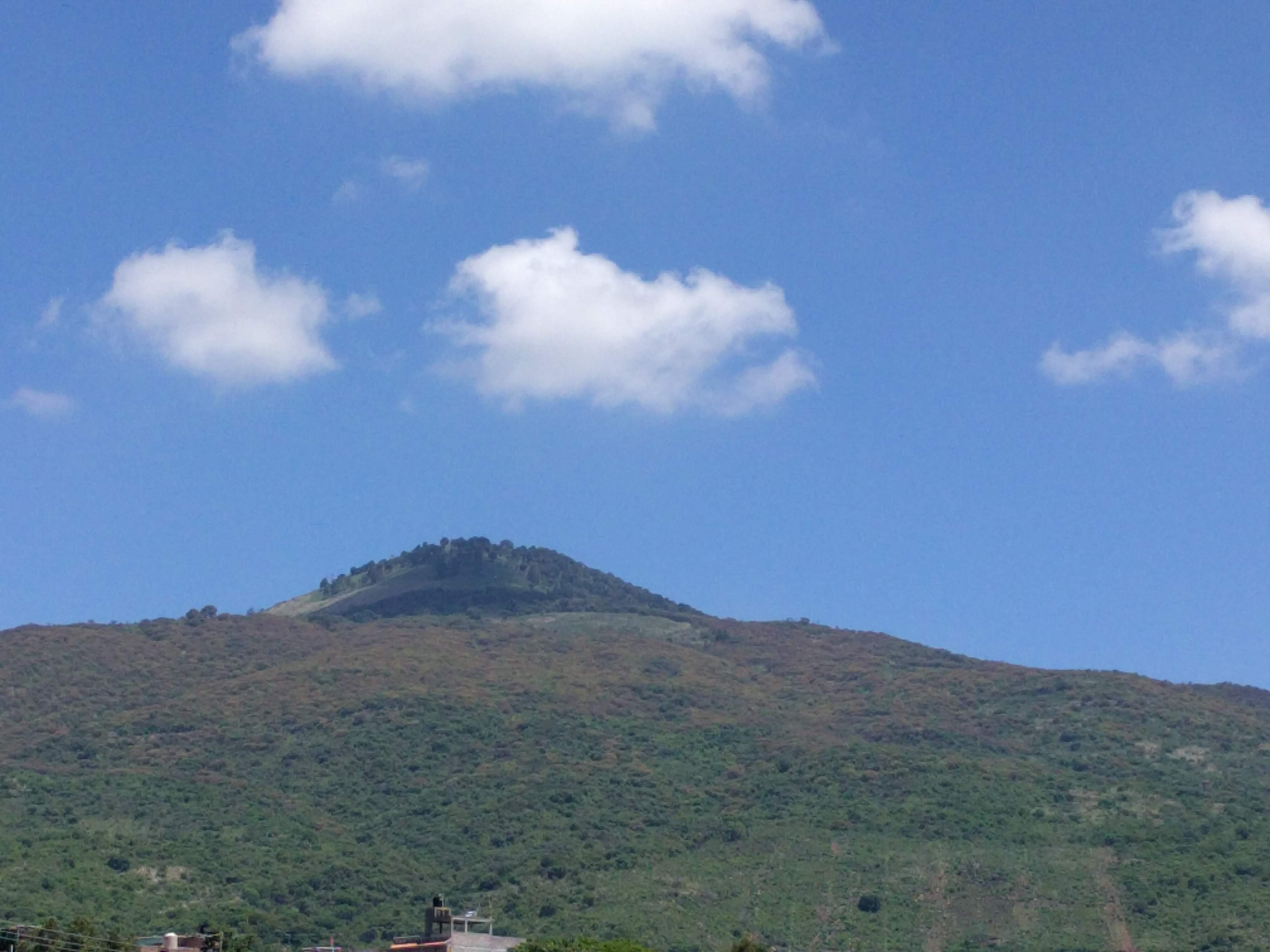
- Quinceo mountain seen from the northwest of Morelia

Highest point
- Elevation: 2,787 m (9,144 ft)

Geography
- Location: Morelia, Mexico

Climbing
- Easiest route: hiking

The Cerro del Quinceo (2,787 m) is an inactive volcano and the highest mountain in the municipality of Morelia, Michoacán, Mexico. The mountain is a destination for tracking, hiking and hang gliding. Estadio Morelos home to Mexico Liga de Expansión football club Atlético Morelia is located at the foot of the mountain.
