= Guillermo Franco =

Argentine-Mexican footballer (born 1976)

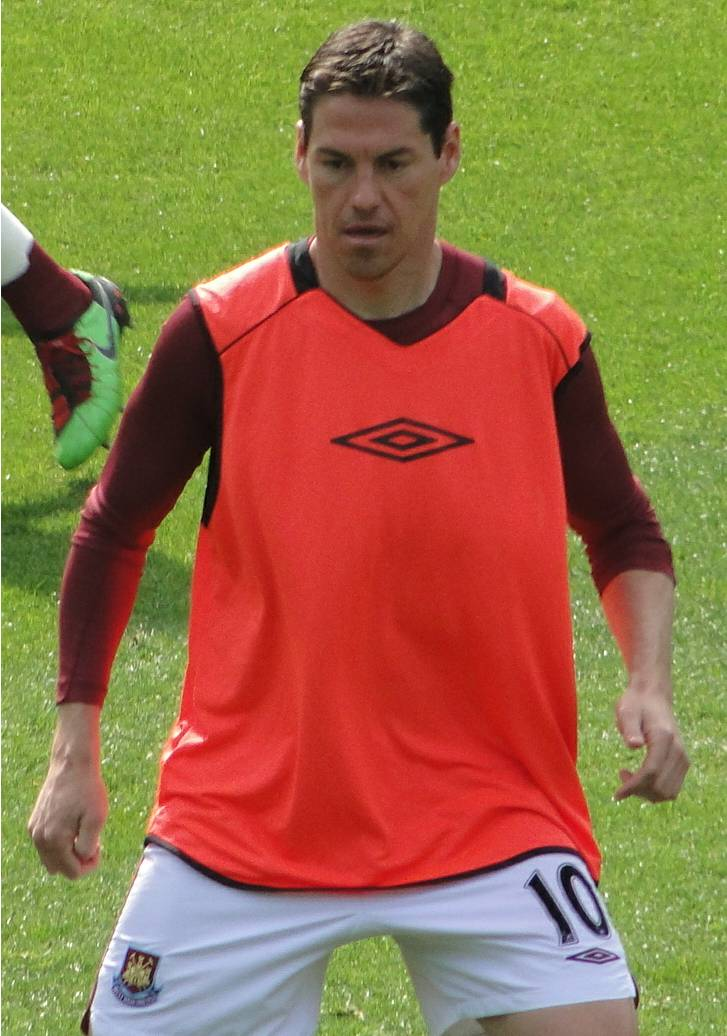
- Franco playing for West Ham United in 2010

Personal information
- Full name: Guillermo Luis Franco Farquarson
- Date of birth: 3 November 1976 (age 49)
- Place of birth: Corrientes, Argentina
- Height: 1.81 m (5 ft 11 in)
- Position: Striker

Senior career*
Years	Team	Apps	(Gls)
1995–2002	San Lorenzo	96	(23)
2002–2005	Monterrey	119	(63)
2006–2009	Villarreal	81	(14)
2009–2010	West Ham United	23	(5)
2010–2012	Vélez Sársfield	18	(5)
2012	Pachuca	12	(0)
2012	Chicago Fire	3	(0)
Total		352	(110)

International career
2005–2010	Mexico	25	(7)

Managerial career
- 2021–2022: Monterrey Reserves and Academy
Medal record
Representing Mexico
CONCACAF Gold Cup
Winner	CONCACAF Gold Cup	2009
- * Club domestic league appearances and goals

Guillermo "Guille" Luis Franco Farquarson (born 3 November 1976) is a former professional footballer who played as a striker. Born and raised in Argentina, he played for the Mexico national team.

== Early life ==
Guillermo Franco was born in Corrientes, the capital city of the Corrientes Province in Argentina.

== Club career ==
=== San Lorenzo ===
Franco began his career with Argentine Primera División side San Lorenzo, playing with the team from 1996 to 2002 mainly as a right winger.

=== Monterrey ===
He then joined Mexican Monterrey in the middle of 2002, and made his debut during the 2002 Apertura. Franco was very successful with the Rayados, and led the league in scoring during the 2004 Apertura with 15 goals in 16 games, playing as a striker. He was part of the team that won the Mexican Primera División championship in 2003 and achieved runner-up position twice in 2004 and 2005.

=== Villarreal ===
Subsequently, Franco spent three years in Spain playing for Villarreal, but his spell was plagued with injuries. In his first season, Franco helped Villarreal reach the semifinal of the UEFA Champions League where they lost to Arsenal. Franco also scored a goal that qualified Villarreal for the UEFA Cup, in a 1–0 victory against Celta de Vigo.

=== West Ham United ===
In September 2009, Franco signed for West Ham United on a one-year contract, becoming the first Mexican to play for the Hammers. On 25 September, it was disclosed that due to West Ham's perilous financial situation following former chairman Björgólfur Guðmundsson's financial collapse, West Ham's CEO Scott Duxbury, and their Sporting and Football Technical Director Gianluca Nani, had part financed the deal from their own salaries. Franco made his debut for West Ham on 17 October 2009 in a 2–1 away defeat to Stoke City. He scored his first goal for the team on 31 October 2009 to put them 1–0 up against Sunderland away from home, in a game that finished 2–2. Franco became the third Mexican player to score in the Premier League, Jared Borgetti and Carlos Vela being the first and second respectively. On 24 April 2010, Franco assisted Scott Parker, who scored for the winner in a 3–2 victory against Wigan Athletic; a win which would see them safe from relegation. In May it was announced that West Ham would release Franco.

=== Vélez Sársfield ===
The striker then spent one semester as a free agent, until he joined Vélez Sársfield back in Argentina in January 2011. He signed a one-year deal, and made his debut coming on as a second-half substitute for Santiago Silva in a 2–2 draw at Independiente in the first fixture of the 2011 Clausura. Subsequently, he played the starting minutes of the Copa Libertadores debut against Caracas FC, suffering a shoulder injury that left him out for the remainder of the season. Having played less than 30 minutes, he offered the club to terminate his contract, or suspend his salary until he recovered, though Vélez rejected it. He returned for the 2011 Copa Libertadores quarter-finals, entering the field and scoring one goal from a penalty in a 4–2 victory over Libertad. He also played the last 5 games of the 2011 Clausura (one as a starter), helping his team win the Argentine league title.

=== Pachuca ===
On 21 January 2012, he joined Pachuca of the Mexican Primera División. The next season, the Chicago Fire signed him.

=== Chicago Fire ===
Franco signed with Major League Soccer club Chicago Fire on 14 September 2012. On 21 January 2013 the club announced Franco's contract option was not picked up for the new season.

On 29 January 2013, Franco announced his retirement from football.

== International career ==
In 2004, Franco became a naturalized Mexican citizen after settling in Mexico in 2002; and made senior national team debut in 2005.

Franco played at the 2006 FIFA World Cup and was a part of the 2009 CONCACAF Gold Cup squad. During the 2010 World Cup qualification, he contributed two goals in six games. He played in all four matches for Mexico at the 2010 FIFA World Cup.

In September 2010, Franco announced his retirement from international football.

== Career statistics ==
=== Club ===
Appearances and goals by club, season and competition
Club	Season	League			Cup		Continental		Total	
Club	Season	Division	Apps	Goals	Apps	Goals	Apps	Goals	Apps	Goals
San Lorenzo	1995–96	Argentine Primera División	3	0					3	0
San Lorenzo	1996–97	Argentine Primera División	6	0					6	0
San Lorenzo	1997–98	Argentine Primera División	10	1					10	1
San Lorenzo	1998–99	Argentine Primera División	6	0					6	0
San Lorenzo	1999–2000	Argentine Primera División	26	10					26	10
San Lorenzo	2000–01	Argentine Primera División	19	7					19	7
San Lorenzo	2001–02	Argentine Primera División	26	5					26	5
San Lorenzo	Total		76	23					76	23
Monterrey	2002–03	Liga MX	39	15					39	15
Monterrey	2003–04	Liga MX	30	12					30	12
Monterrey	2004–05	Liga MX	28	23					28	23
Monterrey	2005–06	Liga MX	22	13					22	13
Monterrey	Total		119	63					119	63
Villarreal	2005–06	La Liga	12	4			5	0	17	4
Villarreal	2006–07	La Liga	27	2	5	0			32	2
Villarreal	2007–08	La Liga	24	8			6	1	30	9
Villarreal	2008–09	La Liga	18	0	1	1	6	1	25	2
Villarreal	Total		81	14	6	1	17	2	104	17
West Ham United	2009–10	Premier League	23	5					23	5
Vélez Sársfield	2010–11	Argentine Primera División	6	0			3	1	9	1
Vélez Sársfield	2011–12	Argentine Primera División	12	5			6	4	18	9
Vélez Sársfield	Total		18	5			9	5	27	10
Pachuca	2011–12	Mexican Primera División	12	0					12	0
Chicago Fire	2012	MLS	3	0					3	0
Career total			332	110	6	1	26	7	364	118

=== International ===
Appearances and goals by national team and year
National team	Year	Apps	Goals
Mexico	2005	4	1
Mexico	2006	6	1
Mexico	2007	0	0
Mexico	2008	2	0
Mexico	2009	8	4
Mexico	2010	5	1
Total		25	7

Scores and results list Mexico's goal tally first, score column indicates score after each Franco goal.

List of international goals scored by Guillermo Franco
No.	Date	Venue	Opponent	Score	Result	Competition
1	8 October 2005	Estadio Alfonso Lastras, San Luis Potosí, Mexico	Guatemala	1–1	5–2	2006 FIFA World Cup qualification
2	1 March 2006	Pizza Hut Park, Frisco, United States	Ghana	1–0	1–0	Friendly
3	10 June 2009	Estadio Azteca, Mexico City, Mexico	Trinidad and Tobago	1–0	2–1	2010 FIFA World Cup qualification
4	23 July 2009	Soldier Field, Chicago, United States	Costa Rica	1–0	5–3 (p.s.o.)	2009 CONCACAF Gold Cup
5	26 July 2009	Giants Stadium, East Rutherford, United States	United States	5–0	5–0	2009 CONCACAF Gold Cup
6	5 September 2009	Estadio Ricardo Saprissa, San José, Costa Rica	Costa Rica	2–0	3–0	2010 FIFA World Cup qualification
7	24 May 2010	Wembley Stadium, London, England	England	1–2	1–3	Friendly

== Honours ==
San Lorenzo

- Argentine Primera División Clausura: 2001
- Copa Mercosur: 2001

Monterrey

- Mexican Primera División Clausura: 2003

Vélez Sársfield

- Argentine Primera División Clausura: 2011

Mexico

- CONCACAF Gold Cup: 2009

Individual

- Mexican Primera División Golden Ball: Clausura 2003
- Mexican Primera División Golden Boot: Apertura 2004
