= Ignacio Carrasco =

Mexican footballer (born 1982)

Ignacio “Nachita” Carrasco
Personal information
- Full name: Oscar Ignacio”Nachita” Carrasco Sotelo
- Date of birth: 30 June 1982 (age 44)
- Place of birth: Cotzio, Mexico
- Height: 1.68 m (5 ft 6 in)
- Position: Midfielder

Team information
- Current team: Delfines
- Number: 8

Senior career*
Years	Team	Apps	(Gls)
2002–	Morelia	85	(8)
2005–2006	→ Querétaro (loan)	30	(2)
2009	→ Tijuana (loan)	9	(2)
2010	→ León (loan)	15	(0)
2010–2011	→ Correcaminos (loan)	50	(2)
2012–2013	→ Cruz Azul Hidalgo (loan)	27	(1)
2013–	→ Delfines (loan)	10	(2)
- * Club domestic league appearances and goals as of 11 October 2013

Oscar Ignacio Carrasco Sotelo (born 30 June 1982) is a Mexican footballer who last played as a midfielder for Venados F.C. in Ascenso MX. He had previously played for a number of teams in the Mexican second tier after having played for Monarcas Morelia in Liga MX.
