= Enrique Vizcarra =

Mexican footballer (born 1975)

Personal information
- Full name: Enrique Vizcarra Luna
- Date of birth: 24 December 1975 (age 50)
- Place of birth: Torreón, Coahuila, Mexico
- Height: 1.82 m (6 ft 0 in)
- Positions: Defender; midfielder

Youth career
- –1996: Santos Laguna

Senior career*
| Years | Team | Apps | (Gls) |
| 1996–2002 | Santos Laguna | 42 | (0) |
| 2001–2002 | → Toluca (loan) | 13 | (0) |
| 2003–2004 | Morelia | 40 | (1) |
| 2004–2007 | Lobos BUAP | 91 | (25) |
| 2007–2011 | Puebla | 4 | (0) |
| 2007–2011 | → Alacranes de Durango (loan) | 76 | (7) |
| Total | | 266 | (33) |
- * Club domestic league appearances and goals

Enrique Vizcarra Luna (born 24 December 1975) is a Mexican retired footballer who played as a defender or midfielder.
