= Reinaldo Navia =

Chilean footballer (born 1978)

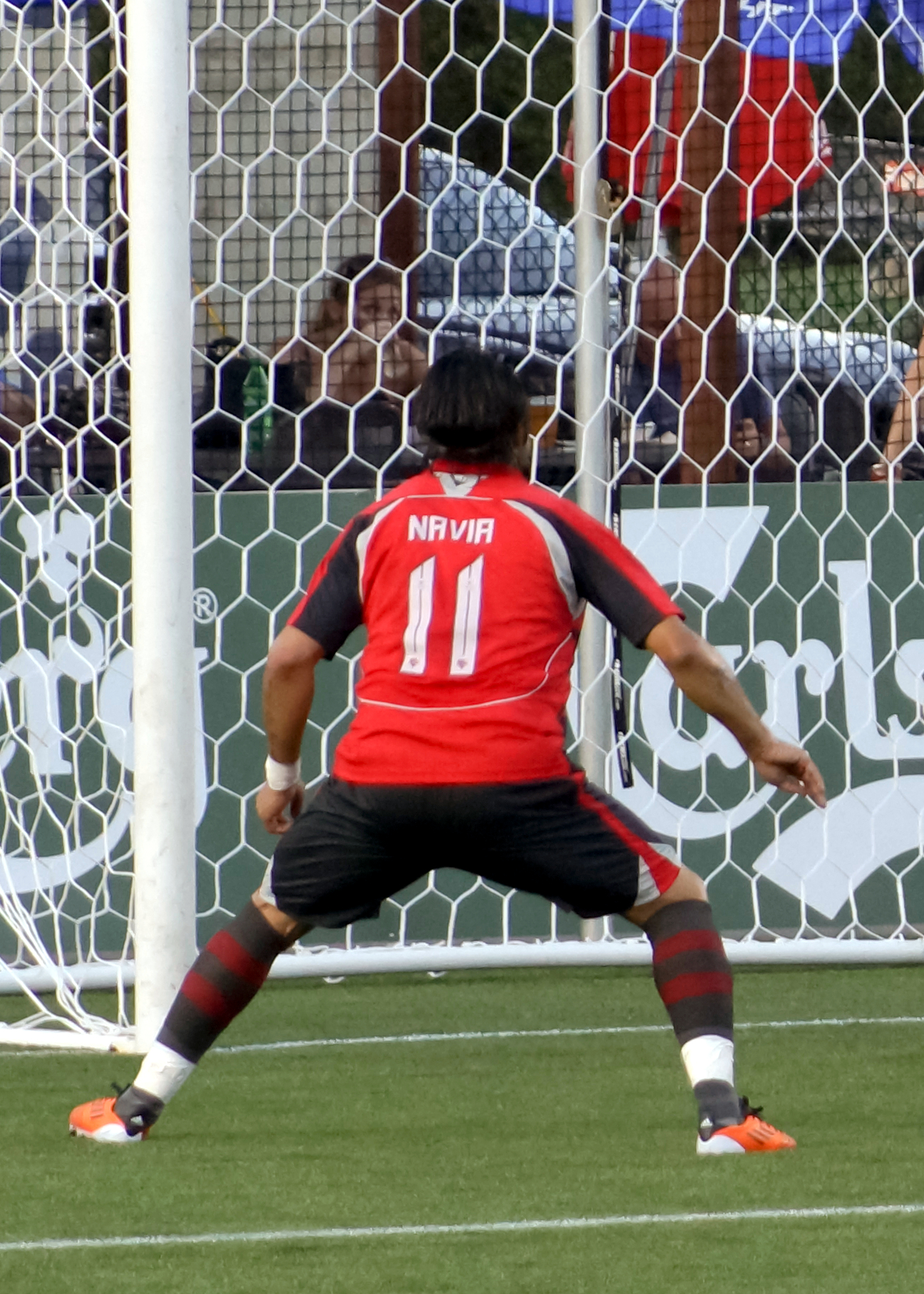
- Navia playing for Atlanta Silverbacks in 2012

Personal information
- Full name: Reinaldo Marcelino Navia Amador
- Date of birth: 10 May 1978 (age 48)
- Place of birth: Quillota, Chile
- Height: 1.72 m (5 ft 8 in)
- Position: Striker

Youth career
- Santiago Wanderers

Senior career*
Years	Team	Apps	(Gls)
1995–2000	Santiago Wanderers	96	(42)
2001–2002	Tecos UAG	67	(32)
2003	Monarcas Morelia	38	(26)
2004–2005	América	39	(20)
2006	Monterrey	13	(3)
2006	San Luis	12	(6)
2007	Atlas	13	(4)
2007–2008	Racing Club	16	(1)
2008–2009	LDU Quito	12	(3)
2009	Santiago Morning	13	(2)
2010	Irapuato	14	(3)
2011	Ñublense	9	(3)
2012	Atlanta Silverbacks	17	(6)

International career
1998	Chile B	1	(0)
1999–2007	Chile	40	(10)
2000	Chile U23	11	(5)
Medal record
Representing Chile
Men's Football
Olympic Games
Bronze medal – third place	2000 Sydney	Team competition
- * Club domestic league appearances and goals

Reinaldo Marcelino Navia Amador (born 10 May 1978) is a Chilean former professional footballer who played as a striker. He was a member of the Chile national squad that competed in the 2000 Summer Olympics at Sydney, making an offensive duo with the historic Chilean striker Ivan Zamorano and earning a bronze medal.

== Club career ==
=== Early career ===
Born and raised in Quillota, Navia joined Santiago Wanderers youth ranks before he made his professional debut with the team in 1995, aged 17.

After five successful seasons in Wanderers, he was transferred to UAG Tecos of Mexico in 2001. He remained in Tecos for two seasons, scoring 30 goals in 62 appearances.

In January 2003, Navia joined Monarcas Morelia. He immediately greatly impressed to Monarcas, scoring in one season scored 26 goals over the Torneo Clausura and Apertura. At the end of season, it was rumored that many clubs of Europe were interested in him.

=== América ===
In December 2003, it was announced that América's Dutchman coach Leo Beenhakker was interested in having Navia in his squad after his notable season in Morelia. On 26 December, Navia signed a three-year contract with América, receiving a salary of $1.4 million per season for an undisclosed fee. One day later he was presented as new player of the club.

He made his club debut in the InterLiga 2004 in a 3–2 victory over Atlante, scoring twice during the game. On 14 January, he again scored for InterLiga, against his former club Morelia in a 3–1 away win. In the first leg final, Navia scored twice in a 2–1 win against Atlas. In that same season, América was champion of the InterLiga qualifying to the Copa Libertadores.Navia was the top goalscorer of the tournament with 6 goals. On 24 January, Navia made his league debut in the Clásico Joven against Cruz Azul. His first goal in the league was at the 2nd minute of game in a 3–2 win against Veracruz. On 11 March, Navia scored an important goal for the Libertadores in a 2–1 win over São Caetano with an impressive header at the 85th minute. On 11 May, Navia scored the only goal for América in the 1–0 win at the derby against Guadalajara with a semi-bicycle kick. Because of the incidents that he and six teammates performed in the game against São Caetano, Navia had to pay a fine of $180.000.

On 6 November 2004, Navia suffered a serious injury in the 1–0 victory over UANL Tigres in a league game at Estadio Azteca. Six days later, América confirmed one week later that Navia had ruptured the kneecap ligament in his left knee. On 23 July 2005, Navia back to play for América after eight months for the Campeón de Campeones final as a 30th-minute substitution in a 0–0 draw against Pumas UNAM. In October, was revealed that La Liga side Racing de Santander are interesting on sign to Navia in a six-month loan.

In December 2005, Monterrey's coach Miguel Herrera confirmed the arrival of Navia to The Striped Ones for replace to Guillermo Franco. In the Clausura 2006, he only scored 3 goals in 13 appearances. In the Holy Week, Navia was excluded from the squad because he was not present in a training with the reserves squad and also the president of the club accused him of being guilty of the bad season of Monterrey. On 29 May, Navia joined San Luis. After another irregular season, in 2007 he moved to Atlas.

=== Racing and LDU Quito ===
After of failed to join Colo-Colo for indiscipline problems in the Copa América, on 24 August 2007, Navia had come to verbal agreements with Racing Club de Avellaneda, being presented as new player of the club one day later saying: "I want to collaborate in a team that need be champion".

Navia made his Primera División debut for the Academy on 3 October, as a 73rd-minute substitution in a 3–2 home defeat against Tigre. Three days later he made his first start for Racing in a 2–2 draw with Rosario Central, being replaced in the 63rd minute. His firsts 90th minutes for the club was in the last week of the tournament against in a 1–0 victory over Colón. He had more continuity in the team during the season 2008, especially in the final part of the tournament with the coach Juan Manuel Llop. On 17 May, as a starter he scored his first goal for the club at 14th minute in a 2–1 loss against Boca Juniors at La Bombonera.

Navia joined LDU Quito on 24 July 2008, signing a one-year contract for an undisclosed fee. Shortly after his arrival he looked his move to Quito as a chance for return to the Chile national team after an abrupt departure after of the Copa América 2007.

His debut came on 14 August for the first round Copa Sudamericana against Bolívar, game on that he scored the club's fourth goal in a 4–2 victory. Navia made his first league appearance in a 0–0 draw with Tecnico Universitario. For the Sudamericana in the second leg of the first round's, he scored his side's goal in a 2–1 away loss to Bolívar. On 14 September, he scored a goal against Deportivo Cuenca at 90-minute, defeating 2–1 to Cuenca. His goal made that Liga qualified to the playoffs in the second place of the Group stage. In the final stage the club was runner-up of the tournament and in the league last game he scored a twice in a 4–3 victory over Macará.

On 21 December 2008, he played in the final of the FIFA Club World Cup against Manchester United as an 87th-minute substitution for Luis Bolaños. In this game Liga was defeated 1–0 with a goal of Wayne Rooney at 73rd minute. After of the runner-up achieved the club, many fans at Casa Blanca Stadium received to the team in his arrival to Ecuador. Navia affirmed that he are very excited as his teammates. On 16 February 2009, he suffered a two-month injury risking his permanence in the team, because his contract expire on June.

=== Santiago Morning ===
On 6 August 2009, after a failed transfer to Universidad Católica, he joined to Santiago Morning for an undisclosed fee on a six-month deal with purchase option for one season, because that he not had an option of play in other club international. In the same day, he was presented as new player of Morning with the number 10 and he said: "Do not compare myself to anyone... I have made my career, I know who I am, I know I can give and I hope to perform" affirmed Navia.

At the end of the month, he made his morning debut against Cobresal as a 59th-minute substitute for Miguel Hernández. On 26 September, he scored his first goal in his return to Chile in a 3–1 victory over Universidad de Chile at Francisco Sánchez Rumoroso Stadium. In his third appearance for the Copa Chile against Curicó Unido he scored his second for the club. Because of the good morning performance in the regular phase of the tournament, the team qualified to the playoffs, but was eliminated in the semifinals by Católica, in the second leg of the semifinals, Navia scored his third side's goal in a 5–3 loss to Las Condes's side.

=== Return to Mexico ===
In December 2009, he failed to join to CD Veracruz, because the known 'gentlemen's deal' that he agreed when he played for América in 2004 and shortly after he was released, for the pact the 'eagles' charged US$300.000. During February 2010, he was on trial with the Major League Soccer side New England Revolution, he was on talks with the team. After he failed to join to Revolution, was announced that Navia had come to verbal agreements with Sporting Cristal of Peru, but he despite this offer for economic issues, including after of pass the medical and immediately joined to Irapuato of the Liga de Ascenso. Navia's club debut came on 24 July in a 1–0 defeat against Mérida at Carlos Iturrialde Stadium. He scored his first goal for Irapuato in a 4–1 victory over La Piedad. At the end of season, he resigned his contract and finished as released player.

=== Ñublense ===
On 5 March 2011, it was announced that Navia returned to Chilean football for join Ñublense, replacing Luis Flores Abarca, who retired due to heart problems. On 13 March, he made his league debut for the club in a 2–0 defeat against Universidad Católica. In his second game for the club, he scored his first goal for the club and the only of the match against Unión San Felipe after a penalty kick scored in the 16th minute.

=== Atlanta Silverbacks ===
Navia signed with Atlanta Silverbacks of the second division North American Soccer League on 5 January 2012.

== International career ==
Navia was a frequent player at forward for the Chile national team, where he wore Iván Zamorano's classic number; 9. He made his international debut on 17 February 1999, in a match against Guatemala. Prior to this, he played for Chile B against England B on 10 February 1998. Chile won by 2-1. In 2007, it was rumored that he might return to his homeland to play for Colo-Colo to replace the departing Humberto Suazo, however, in July 2007, Colo-Colo announced they would not take him due to his bad behavior during the 2007 Copa América in Venezuela. He was never called up again.

== Career statistics ==
Goal	Date	Venue	Opponent	Score	Competition
1	9 February 2000	Estadio Regional Chiledeportes, Valparaíso, Chile	Australia	2-1	Friendly
2	27 March 2001	Estadio Nacional, Lima, Peru	Peru	1-3	2002 World Cup Qualifier
3	11 July 2001	Estadio Metropolitano, Barranquilla, Colombia	Ecuador	4-1	2001 Copa America
4	1 September 2001	Estadio Nacional, Santiago, Chile	France	2-1	Friendly
5	3 September 2003	Estadio Monumental, Buenos Aires, Argentina	Argentina	2-2	2006 World Cup Qualifier
6	18 February 2004	Home Depot Center, Los Angeles, United States	Mexico	1-1	Friendly
7	6 June 2004	Estadio Nacional, Santiago, Chile	Brazil	1-1	2006 World Cup Qualifier
8	7 October 2006	Estadio Sausalito, Viña del Mar, Chile	Peru	3-2	Copa del Pacífico
9	11 October 2006	Estadio Jorge Basadre, Tacna, Peru	Peru	1-0	Copa del Pacífico
10	28 March 2007	Estadio Fiscal de Talca, Talca, Chile	Costa Rica	1-1	Friendly

== Honours ==
Santiago Wanderers

- Segunda División de Chile: 1995

América

- Mexican Primera División: 2005 Clausura
- Campeón de Campeones: 2005

Chile

- Summer Olympics bronze: 2000
