= Martín Gómez (footballer, born 1983) =

Argentine footballer

Personal information
- Full name: Alberto Martín Gómez
- Date of birth: January 26, 1983 (age 43)
- Place of birth: Mendoza, Argentina
- Height: 1.65 m (5 ft 5 in)
- Position: Winger

Youth career
- Morelia

Senior career*
Years	Team	Apps	(Gls)
2001–2004	Morelia	21	(0)
2005–2009	Independiente Rivadavia	68	(13)
2009–2010	Independiente	30	(1)
2011	Tigre	11	(0)
2011–2014	Independiente Rivadavia	56	(5)
2014	Manta	19	(3)
2014–2015	Deportes Iquique	26	(4)
2015–2016	Deportes Antofagasta	15	(0)
2016–2017	Deportivo Maipú	12	(0)
2017–2018	Racing de Córdoba	17	(1)
- * Club domestic league appearances and goals as of 01:37, 4 December 2019 (UTC)

Alberto Martín Gómez (born 26 January 1983 in Mendoza) is an Argentine football forward.

== Career ==
Gómez began his playing career in Mexico with Monarcas Morelia in 2001. He returned to his home province of Mendoza in 2005 to play for Independiente Rivadavia where he played until 2009.

Gómez joined Club Atlético Independiente of the Primera División in 2009. He made his debut for the club on 3 September 2009 in a 2–0 home win against Godoy Cruz. He soon established himself as a regular first team player and scored his first Primera División goal in a 0–3 away win over San Lorenzo on 15 November 2009.

== Honours ==
Independiente

- Copa Sudamericana (1): 2010
