= Mario Ruíz =

Mexican footballer (born 1977)

Personal information
- Full name: Mario Alejandro Ruíz Díaz
- Date of birth: 12 January 1977 (age 49)
- Place of birth: Morelia, Mexico
- Height: 1.74 m (5 ft 9 in)
- Position: Defender

Senior career*
Years	Team	Apps	(Gls)
1999–2003	Monarcas Morelia	144	(2)
2003–2010	UANL Tigres	148	(2)
2010–2011	Club León	35	(0)

International career
2003–2005	Mexico	9	(0)
- * Club domestic league appearances and goals as of November 04, 2008

Mario Alejandro Ruíz Díaz (Note: In this Spanish name, the first or paternal surname is Ruíz and the second or maternal family name is Díaz.) (born 12 January 1977) is a former Mexican footballer and defender. He last played for Club León. He started his career in 1997 with Morelia, where he became a symbol. In 2003, he was transferred to Tigres.

== Honours ==
=== Club ===
Morelia

- Mexican Primera División: Invierno 2000
