= Hernán Buján =

Argentine footballer (born 1969)

Personal information
- Full name: Hernán Leonel Buján
- Date of birth: 5 December 1974 (age 51)
- Place of birth: Argentina
- Position: Midfielder

Senior career*
Years	Team	Apps	(Gls)
1995	River	1	(0)
1995–1997	All Boys		
1997–1998	Los Andes	34	(2)
1999–2000	Instituto		
2000–2001	Talleres	20	(1)
2001–2002	Huracán	35	(1)
2002	Morelia		
2003	León		
2003–2005	Olimpo	55	(1)
2005–2006	Tiro Federal	27	(0)
2006–2007	Godoy Cruz	27	(2)
2007–2008	Instituto		
2008–2009	Independiente Rivadavia	31	(2)
2009	All Boys		
2010	Unión	11	(0)
2010	Lemos		
- * Club domestic league appearances and goals

Hernán Leonel Buján (born 5 December 1974) is an Argentine former footballer who played as a midfielder currently first-team coach of Al-Ittihad.

== Career ==
In 1999, he signed for Argentine side Instituto. He helped the club achieve promotion. In 2003, he signed for Argentine side Olimpo. He was nicknamed "spark plug" while playing for the club.

== Personal life ==
He was born in 1974 in Argentina. He has been close friends with Argentine football manager Marcelo Gallardo.
