= Carlos González (footballer, born 1977) =

Mexican footballer

Carlos Gonzalez
Personal information
- Full name: Carlos Humberto González Rolón
- Date of birth: 11 March 1977 (age 49)
- Place of birth: Guadalajara, Jalisco, Mexico
- Height: 1.75 m (5 ft 9 in)
- Position: Defender

Team information
- Current team: UNAM U-15 (Manager)

Senior career*
Years	Team	Apps	(Gls)
1994–1995	Atlas	?	(?)
1995–2001	Atletico San Francisco	?	(?)
2001–2002	Estudiantes Tecos	?	(?)
2002–2007	Monarcas Morelia	137	(3)
2007–2010	UNAM Pumas	47	(2)
2010–2012	Pumas Morelos	50	(7)

Managerial career
- 2016–2017: Monarcas Morelia Reserves and Academy
- 2018–2020: UNAM Premier
- 2020: Pumas Tabasco
- 2021–2022: UNAM Reserves and Academy
- 2023: UNAM (assistant)
- 2023–: UNAM Reserves and Academy
- * Club domestic league appearances and goals

Carlos Humberto González Rolón (born March 11, 1977) is a retired Mexican football player and current manager of Pumas Tabasco. Gonzalez was born in Guadalajara, he played as a defender.

== Honours ==
- Mexican Primera División: (1)

Pumas UNAM

- (Mexico) Clausura 2009
