= Miguel Javid Hernández =

Mexican footballer and manager (born 1976)

Personal information
- Full name: Miguel Javid Hernández Rodríguez
- Date of birth: 20 March 1976 (age 50)
- Place of birth: Veracruz City, Veracruz, Mexico
- Height: 1.80 m (5 ft 11 in)
- Position: Defender

Senior career*
Years	Team	Apps	(Gls)
1994–1997	Tiburones Rojos de Veracruz	11	(1)
1997–2004	Monarcas Morelia	64	(0)
2004–2006	Tiburones Rojos de Veracruz	31	(0)
2006–2008	Tiburones Rojos de Coatzacoalcos	43	(0)
2009–2011	Albinegros de Orizaba	72	(3)
2011–2012	Tiburones Rojos de Veracruz	19	(0)

Managerial career
- 2013: Tiburones Rojos de Veracruz Premier (Assistant)
- 2014–2015: Atlético Veracruz
- 2015: Monarcas Morelia (Assistant)
- 2015–2020: Monarcas Morelia Reserves and Academy
- 2020–2021: Mazatlán (Women)
- * Club domestic league appearances and goals

Miguel Javid Hernández Rodríguez (born March 20, 1976) is a Mexican football manager and former player.

Hernández played in the Mexican Primera División with Tiburones Rojos de Veracruz and Monarcas Morelia, debuting in 1994 with Veracruz.
