= Ismael Íñiguez =

Mexican footballer (born 1981)

Personal information
- Full name: Ismael Íñiguez González
- Date of birth: 23 July 1981 (age 45)
- Place of birth: Ocotlán, Jalisco, Mexico
- Height: 1.66 m (5 ft 5 1/2 in)
- Positions: Attacking midfielder; winger

Team information
- Current team: Calor (Manager)

Senior career*
Years	Team	Apps	(Gls)
2001–2003	Morelia	65	(14)
2003–2014	UNAM	215	(27)
2010–2011	→ Necaxa (loan)	18	(3)
2011–2012	→ Tijuana (loan)	11	(0)
2012–2013	→ Lobos BUAP (loan)	18	(3)
2013–2014	→ Correcaminos (loan)	19	(5)

International career
2004	Mexico U23	3	(0)

Managerial career
- 2016: Nuevos Valores de Ocotlán
- 2016–2017: UNAM Reserves and Academy
- 2018: UNAM Premier
- 2018–2019: UNAM Reserves and Academy
- 2019–2020: Atlante (Assistant)
- 2020–2021: Querétaro Reserves and Academy
- 2026–: Calor
Medal record
Representing Mexico
Men's Football
Silver medal – second place	2002 San Salvador	Team competition
- * Club domestic league appearances and goals

Ismael Íñiguez González (born 23 July 1981) is a Mexican football coach and a former player who played as an attacking midfielder and winger.

He was part of the Mexico 2004 Olympic football team, who were eliminated in the first round, having finished third in group A, below group winners Mali and South Korea.

== Honours ==
UNAM

- Mexican Primera División: Clausura 2004, Apertura 2004, Clausura 2009

Mexico Youth

- Central American and Caribbean Games: Silver Medal 2002
- CONCACAF Olympic Qualifying Championship: 2004
