= Alex Fernandes (footballer, born 1973) =

Brazilian footballer (born 1973)

Personal information
- Full name: Alexsandro Fernandes Xavier
- Date of birth: April 4, 1973 (age 53)
- Place of birth: Recife, Brazil
- Height: 1.75 m (5 ft 9 in)
- Position: Striker

Senior career*
Years	Team	Apps	(Gls)
1991–1996	Náutico		
1995	Sport		
1997	Criciúma	21	(2)
1999	Mogi Mirim		
1999–2003	Morelia	134	(71)
2003–2007	Monterrey	85	(31)
- * Club domestic league appearances and goals

Alexsandro Fernandes Xavier (born April 4, 1973 in Recife, Brazil), often known simply as Alex Fernandes, is a former Brazilian football striker.

== Club career ==
Before coming to Mexico, Fernandes played for Brazilian clubs Sport Recife, Náutico, and Mogi Mirim.

=== Monarcas Morelia ===
He joined the Primera División for the 1999 Winter season, debuting for Monarcas Morelia. He would remain with Morelia through the 2002 Apertura, when he was transferred to Monterrey.

Fernandes made a strong debut in Mexico, scoring seven goals in 19 games in the 1999 Invierno, and another nine in the Verano. In total, he scored 72 goals for Morelia in his four years there, including 15 in the 2002 Apertura before his transfer to Monterrey.

=== Monterrey ===
Alex began promisingly with Monterrey as well, scoring 9 goals in 24 games in the 2003 Clausura, and another 11 goals in the Apertura. In that season CF Monterrey, managed by Daniel Passarella, won the Clausura 2003 Championship, and Alex, as well as his teammates, played a key role in the team through the whole season. However, his form dipped in 2004, as he only made nine appearances in the 2004 Clausura, scoring six goals, and only four in the 2004 Apertura, scoring none.

In the Clausura 2005, Alex participation again diminished because of several injuries, but by the Apertura 2005 he was ready to reappear and his goals along with Guillermo Franco's led the team to the Finals. Although he didn't play the Finale against Toluca, because of an injury during the Semifinals against archrival Tigres, Alex is widely recognized as being part of the team's success and effectiveness during that season.

This would be Alex's last tournament until the Apertura 2007 when, after a break from the soccer fields, he returned to CF Monterrey with renewed expectations and hoping to exceed the effectiveness he achieved along with former teammate Guillermo Franco. But once that season ended, in December 2007, Alex finally decided to retire from the soccer fields once and for all.

Alex leaves a decent history in football, including successful performances in several clubs in Brazil and Mexico, but especially in Mexico where he was recognized as an excellent striker and for winning a championship with both of his teams, Monarcas Morelia in Winter 2000 and CF Monterrey in Clausura 2003.

== Honours ==
=== Club ===
Morelia

- Mexican Primera División: Invierno 2000

Monterrey

- Mexican Primera División: Clausura 2003
