= Javier Saavedra =

Mexican footballer (born 1973)

Personal information
- Full name: Javier Saavedra Vázquez
- Date of birth: March 13, 1973 (age 53)
- Place of birth: Peribán, Mexico
- Height: 1.70 m (5 ft 7 in)
- Position: Midfielder

Senior career*
Years	Team	Apps	(Gls)
1996–1998	Toros Neza	84	(8)
1998–2010	UANL	297	(22)
2002–2003	→ Morelia (loan)	48	(12)
2006	→ Jaguares (loan)	19	(3)
2009	→ Indios (loan)	18	(1)
2010	→ Necaxa (loan)	34	(1)
2011	Irapauto	16	(0)
2012–2015	San Antonio Scorpions	35	(2)

International career^{‡}
1997–2002	Mexico	10	(0)
Medal record
Representing Mexico
Third place	Copa America	1997
- * Club domestic league appearances and goals as of October 14, 2013 ‡ National team caps and goals as of August 22, 2007

Javier Saavedra Vázquez (born 13 March 1973) is a Mexican former professional footballer who played as a midfielder.

== Career ==
Saavedra started his career in 1996 with Toros Neza, where he reached a final. He was transferred to Tigres in 2000, and then played for Morelia for a short while in 2002, returning to Tigres in 2003, moving to Chiapas for a short period in 2006, until finally returning to Tigres in 2007.

He has reached 5 finals, two of those finals have been with Tigres and another two with Morelia.

On May 2, 2009, Saavedra scored the game-winning goal against Cruz Azul, the goal saved Indios from relegating to the Primera División A.

On May 8, 2010, Javier won a bi-championship with Necaxa and helped it return to Mexico's First Division.

He played for the Mexico national team during the administration of Manuel Lapuente.

Saavedra signed with expansion San Antonio Scorpions FC of the North American Soccer League on January 24, 2012. He retired in January 2015.

== Honours ==
Tigres UANL

- InterLiga: 2005
