= Estadio Morelos =

Football stadium in Morelia, Mexico

Coordinates: 19°43′07.47″N 101°14′01.04″W

Estadio José María Morelos y Pavón
- Coloso del Quinceo "Colossus of Quinceo"; El Majestuoso "The Majestic"

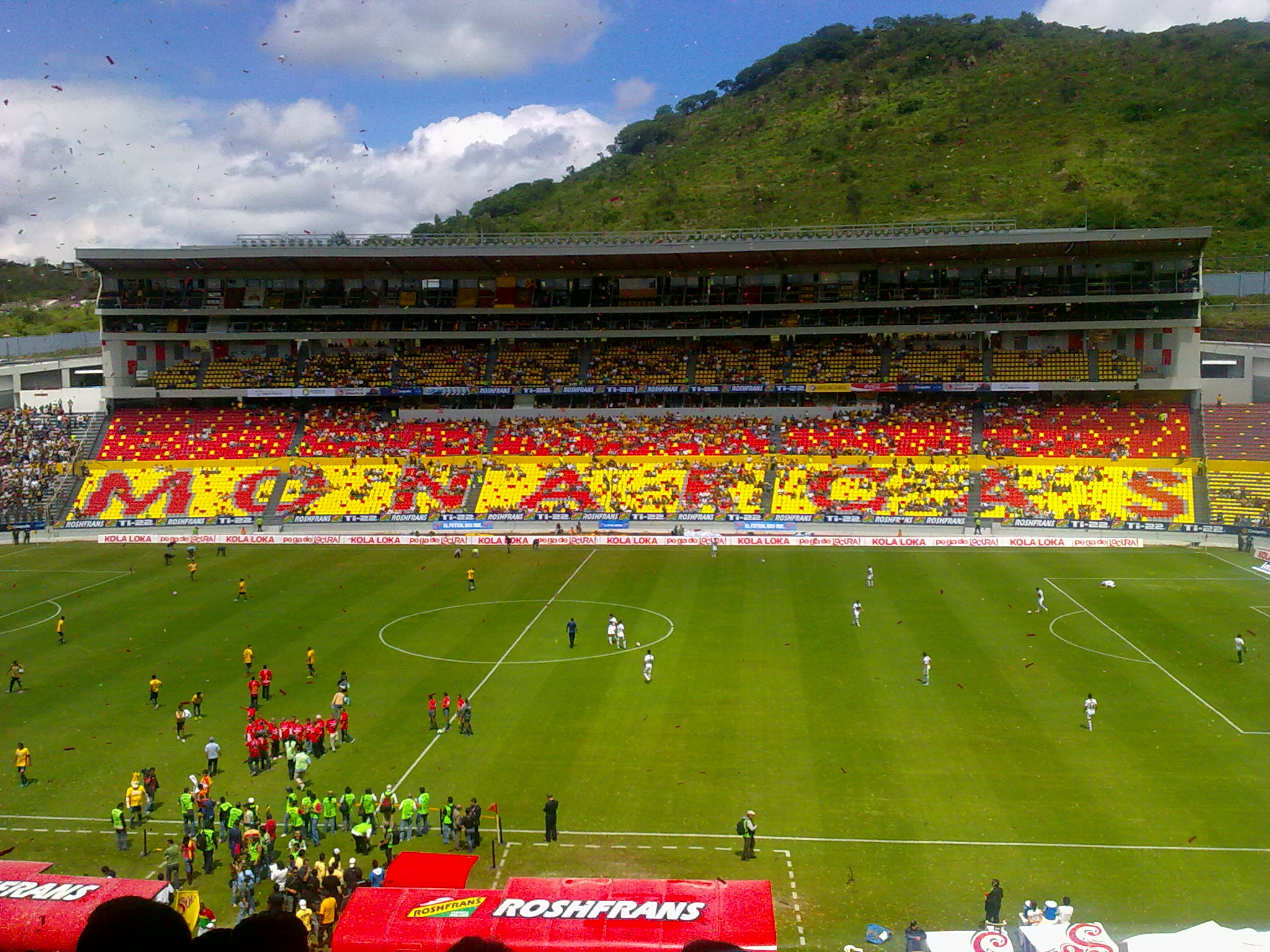
- Interactive map of Estadio José María Morelos y Pavón
- Full name: Estadio José María Morelos y Pavón
- Location: Morelia, Michoacán, Mexico
- Owner: State of Michoacán
- Operator: Jesus Alanis Cornejo
- Capacity: 35,000
- Surface: Grass
- Field size: 110 m × 70 m (360 ft × 230 ft)

Construction
- Opened: 9 April 1989
- Renovated: 2011
- Cost: US$20,000,000.00
- Architect: David Fuentes Arrona

Tenants
- Atlético Morelia (1989–present); Morelia Femenil (2017–2020)

Estadio Morelos is a football stadium along Periférico Independencia, in the Independencia sector, near the base of Cerro del Quinceo in northwest Morelia, Michoacán, Mexico. It is the site of professional football teams; it currently is the site of Atlético Morelia in the Liga de Expansión MX, Mexico's second division. It used to host Monarcas Morelia in the top division of Mexican football and Monarcas Primera A in the league below that. This structure holds various events, such as concerts, religious gatherings, and masses. Its official name, Estadio José María Morelos y Pavón, honors a hero of the Mexican War of Independence.

The stadium has an irregular shape because the areas behind the goals only have one level and 32 rows; along the sides there are 4 levels (one grandstand, one other seating area and two box areas) and 49 stands.

According to the Monarcas Morelia website, the capacity of the stadium is 35,000.

== History ==
The city of Morelia, before the existence of this structure, counted on the Estadio Venustiano Carranza as the home of first division side Atlético Morelia. In 1984, two years before the 1986 FIFA World Cup held in Mexico, it was officially announced that Morelia would be one site for the tournament, and a scale model of the new stadium was shown, very similar in capacity and structure to the Estadio Corregidora of Santiago de Querétaro, and would be in the Southeast of the city, on the current grounds of the sport unit of Adolfo López Mateos. Excavation work soon began, but problems in the foundation led to the suspension of the work, and no other sites were sought. The World Cup site was transferred to the Estadio Sergio León Chavez, in Irapuato.

Following the league tournaments of 1986–1987 and 1987–1988, despite not reaching the finals, the local side put on 2 displays in the liguilla. Demand for the new structure resurged. A group of Michoacán businessmen, led by Luis Álvarez Barreiro and with support from the new governor, Luis Martínez Villicaña, created a pro-construction sponsorship which was financed privately by ticket sales. At the conclusion of the construction, the sponsorship was handed over to the state of Michoacán. The stadium was one venue for the 2011 FIFA U-17 World Cup.

On 16 February 2016, during his first visit to Mexico, Pope Francis spoke to about 50,000 young people at the stadium.

== See also ==
- Atlético Morelia
- List of football stadiums in Mexico
- Lists of stadiums
