= List of Mexican football transfers winter 2009–10 =

This is a list of Mexican football transfers in the Mexican Primera División during the winter 2009–10 transfer window, grouped by club. The 2010 transfer window was held from December 13 to January 16. New squad players were registered for Bicentenario 2010. Football has been played professionally in Mexico since the early 1900s. Since 1996, the country has played two split seasons instead of a traditional long season. There are two separate playoff and league divisions. After many years of calling the regular seasons as "Verano" (Summer) and "Invierno" (Winter); the Mexican Primera División (Mexican First League Division) have changed the names of the competition, and has opted for "Apertura" (opening) and "Clausura" (closing) events. The Apertura division begins in the middle of Mexico's summer and ends before the official start of winter. The Clausura division begins during the New Year, and concludes in the spring season.

== Mexican Primera División ==
=== América ===
In: Note: Flags indicate national team as defined under FIFA eligibility rules; some limited exceptions apply. Players may hold more than one non-FIFA nationality.

No.	Pos.	Nation	Player
7	FW	MEX	Luis Alonso Sandoval (From Monarcas)
16	MF	MEX	Miguel Layún (On loan from (Italy) Atalanta)
36	GK	MEX	Alfonso Blanco (From Pachuca, previously on loan to Irapuato)

Out: Note: Flags indicate national team as defined under FIFA eligibility rules; some limited exceptions apply. Players may hold more than one non-FIFA nationality.

No.	Pos.	Nation	Player
7	MF	COL	Andrés Chitiva (To Atlas)
16	DF	MEX	Rodrigo Íñigo (To Querétaro)
36	DF	CHI	Ricardo Rojas (To Necaxa)
--	DF	MEX	Raúl Alvin Mendoza (To Querétaro)
--	DF	MEX	Diego Cervantes (To Monterrey, previously on loan to Atlante)
--	MF	MEX	Juan Carlos Mosqueda (Loan to Necaxa, previously on loan at Santos Laguna)

=== Atlante ===
In: Note: Flags indicate national team as defined under FIFA eligibility rules; some limited exceptions apply. Players may hold more than one non-FIFA nationality.

No.	Pos.	Nation	Player
9	FW	VEN	Giancarlo Maldonado (Loan return from (Spain) Xerez)
10	FW	PER	Johan Fano (From (Colombia) Once Caldas)

Out: Note: Flags indicate national team as defined under FIFA eligibility rules; some limited exceptions apply. Players may hold more than one non-FIFA nationality.

No.	Pos.	Nation	Player
6	DF	MEX	Diego Cervantes (To Monterrey)
9	FW	URU	Horacio Peralta (To (Uruguay) Central Español)
10	MF	ARG	Gabriel Pereyra (To Monarcas)

=== Atlas ===
In: Note: Flags indicate national team as defined under FIFA eligibility rules; some limited exceptions apply. Players may hold more than one non-FIFA nationality.

No.	Pos.	Nation	Player
2	DF	ARG	Fabricio Fuentes (From (Spain) Villarreal)
7	MF	COL	Andrés Chitiva (From América)
13	FW	BRA	Romulo (From (Brazil) Coritiba)
57	MF	MEX	Jonathan Piña (From Quéretaro)
58	MF	MEX	Carlos Balcázar (From Chiapas)
--	FW	BRA	Leandro do Bonfim (Free, previously with (Brazil) Fluminense)

Out: Note: Flags indicate national team as defined under FIFA eligibility rules; some limited exceptions apply. Players may hold more than one non-FIFA nationality.

No.	Pos.	Nation	Player
2	DF	CHI	Ismael Fuentes (Loan to (Chile) Universidad Católica)
7	MF	ARG	Daniel Ríos (To (Argentina) Colón)
--	FW	BRA	Leandro do Bonfim (Loan to U. de G.)

=== Chiapas ===
In: Note: Flags indicate national team as defined under FIFA eligibility rules; some limited exceptions apply. Players may hold more than one non-FIFA nationality.

No.	Pos.	Nation	Player
6	DF	MEX	Diego Ordaz (From Monterrey)
9	FW	COL	Jackson Martínez (From (Colombia) Independiente Medellín)
14	FW	MEX	Antonio Salazar (From Guadalajara)
16	FW	COL	Luis Fernando Mosquera (From (Colombia) Independiente Medellín)
19	MF	MEX	Edgar Andrade (From Cruz Azul)

Out: Note: Flags indicate national team as defined under FIFA eligibility rules; some limited exceptions apply. Players may hold more than one non-FIFA nationality.

No.	Pos.	Nation	Player
1	FW	MEX	Adolfo Bautista (To Guadalajara)
9	FW	BRA	Josiel (Released)
14	MF	MEX	Carlos Balcázar (To Atlas)
19	FW	ARG	Neri Cardozo (To Monterrey)
24	FW	MEX	Oribe Peralta (Loan return to Santos Laguna)

=== Ciudad Juárez ===
In: Note: Flags indicate national team as defined under FIFA eligibility rules; some limited exceptions apply. Players may hold more than one non-FIFA nationality.

No.	Pos.	Nation	Player
6	DF	MEX	Arturo Alvarado (From Monterrey)
7	FW	HON	Emil Martínez (From (Honduras) Marathón, previously on loan to (China) Beijing Guoan)
9	FW	MEX	Jair García (From Cruz Azul Hidalgo)
16	GK	MEX	Christian Martinez (From Monterrey)
20	DF	MEX	Elliott Huitrón (From Monterrey)
23	DF	MEX	Adrián García Arias (From San Luis)
28	MF	BRA	Carlos Dias (From (Honduras) Real España)

Out: Note: Flags indicate national team as defined under FIFA eligibility rules; some limited exceptions apply. Players may hold more than one non-FIFA nationality.

No.	Pos.	Nation	Player
9	FW	BRA	Rodrigao (Released)
22	MF	URU	Juan Pablo Rodríguez (To San Luis)
--	DF	MEX	Alejandro González (To Cruz Azul Hidalgo)
--	GK	MEX	Óscar Jiménez (To Cruz Azul Hidalgo)
2	DF	MEX	Edwin Hernández (To San Luis)

=== Cruz Azul ===
In: Note: Flags indicate national team as defined under FIFA eligibility rules; some limited exceptions apply. Players may hold more than one non-FIFA nationality.

No.	Pos.	Nation	Player
5	MF	MEX	Israel López (Loan return from Toluca)
9	FW	ARG	Maximiliano Biancucchi (From (Brazil) Flamengo)
10	FW	ARG	Christian Giménez (From Pachuca)
26	DF	BRA	Edcarlos (From (Brazil) Fluminense)

Out: Note: Flags indicate national team as defined under FIFA eligibility rules; some limited exceptions apply. Players may hold more than one non-FIFA nationality.

No.	Pos.	Nation	Player
5	MF	MEX	Gabino Velasco (To León)
8	MF	MEX	Edgar Andrade (To Chiapas)
10	MF	HON	Ramón Núñez (To (Honduras) Olimpia)
14	FW	CHI	Emilio Hernández (To Universidad de Chile)
9	FW	PAR	Pablo Zeballos (To (Paraguay) Cerro Porteño)
--	DF	MEX	Felix González (Released)

=== Guadalajara ===
In: Note: Flags indicate national team as defined under FIFA eligibility rules; some limited exceptions apply. Players may hold more than one non-FIFA nationality.

No.	Pos.	Nation	Player
7	FW	MEX	Adolfo Bautista (From Chiapas)

Out: Note: Flags indicate national team as defined under FIFA eligibility rules; some limited exceptions apply. Players may hold more than one non-FIFA nationality.

No.	Pos.	Nation	Player
--	MF	MEX	Ramón Morales (Released)
--	DF	MEX	José Antonio Olvera (To Santos Laguna, previously on loan to Toluca)
--	MF	MEX	Sergio Amaury Ponce (To Tigres)
--	MF	MEX	Gonzalo Pineda (To San Luis)
--	DF	MEX	Diego Martínez (To San Luis, previously on loan to Monterrey)
--	FW	MEX	Antonio Salazar (To Chiapas)

=== Monterrey ===
In: Note: Flags indicate national team as defined under FIFA eligibility rules; some limited exceptions apply. Players may hold more than one non-FIFA nationality.

No.	Pos.	Nation	Player
4	DF	MEX	Diego Cervantes (From Atlante)
23	FW	BRA	Val Baiano (From (Brazil) Barueri)
18	FW	ARG	Neri Cardozo (From Chiapas)
21	DF	MEX	Sergio Pérez (From Puebla)

Out: Note: Flags indicate national team as defined under FIFA eligibility rules; some limited exceptions apply. Players may hold more than one non-FIFA nationality.

No.	Pos.	Nation	Player
26	FW	CHI	Humberto Suazo (To (Spain) Zaragoza)
23	DF	PAN	Felipe Baloy (To Santos Laguna)
--	MF	MEX	Manuel Pérez (To Toluca)
--	DF	MEX	Arturo Alvarado (To Indios)
--	DF	MEX	Elliott Huitrón (To Indios)
--	GK	MEX	Christian Martínez (To Indios)
--	DF	MEX	Diego Martínez (To San Luis)
--	DF	MEX	Diego Ordaz (To Chiapas)

=== Morelia ===
In: Note: Flags indicate national team as defined under FIFA eligibility rules; some limited exceptions apply. Players may hold more than one non-FIFA nationality.

No.	Pos.	Nation	Player
10	MF	ARG	Gabriel Pereyra (From Atlante)
29	DF	MEX	Christian Sánchez (From Santos Laguna)
58	FW	MEX	Jared Borgetti (From Puebla)

Out: Note: Flags indicate national team as defined under FIFA eligibility rules; some limited exceptions apply. Players may hold more than one non-FIFA nationality.

No.	Pos.	Nation	Player
5	MF	BRA	Wilson Tiago Mathías (To (Brazil) Internacional)
7	FW	MEX	Luis Alonso Sandoval (To América)

=== Pachuca ===
In: Note: Flags indicate national team as defined under FIFA eligibility rules; some limited exceptions apply. Players may hold more than one non-FIFA nationality.

No.	Pos.	Nation	Player
19	FW	CRO	Darío Cvitanich (On loan from (Netherlands) Ajax)

Out: Note: Flags indicate national team as defined under FIFA eligibility rules; some limited exceptions apply. Players may hold more than one non-FIFA nationality.

No.	Pos.	Nation	Player
8	MF	MEX	Gabriel Caballero (Retired)
19	FW	ARG	Christian Giménez (To Cruz Azul)

=== Puebla ===
In: Note: Flags indicate national team as defined under FIFA eligibility rules; some limited exceptions apply. Players may hold more than one non-FIFA nationality.

No.	Pos.	Nation	Player
6	MF	URU	Marcelo Palau (From (Uruguay) Wanderers)
8	FW	MEX	Marco Capetillo (Free)
9	FW	USA	Herculez Gomez (From (United States) Kansas City)
13	FW	URU	Alvaro González (From BUAP)
58	MF	MEX	Hiber Ruíz (From BUAP)

Out: Note: Flags indicate national team as defined under FIFA eligibility rules; some limited exceptions apply. Players may hold more than one non-FIFA nationality.

No.	Pos.	Nation	Player
9	FW	URU	Nicolás Vigneri (To (Spain) Xerez)
24	DF	MEX	Sergio Pérez (To Monterrey)
58	FW	MEX	Jared Borgetti (To Monarcas)

=== Querétaro ===
In: Note: Flags indicate national team as defined under FIFA eligibility rules; some limited exceptions apply. Players may hold more than one non-FIFA nationality.

No.	Pos.	Nation	Player
2	DF	MEX	Rodrigo Íñigo (From América)
6	MF	MEX	Germán Villa (Free)
13	DF	MEX	Raul Alvin Mendoza (On loan from América)
17	DF	MEX	Héctor Altamirano (From Veracruz)
29	FW	ARG	Julio César Laffatigue (On loan from (Chile) Universidad de Concepción)
--	FW	MEX	Alejandro Corona (From Cruz Azul Hidalgo)

Out: Note: Flags indicate national team as defined under FIFA eligibility rules; some limited exceptions apply. Players may hold more than one non-FIFA nationality.

No.	Pos.	Nation	Player
9	FW	ARG	Mauro Néstor Gerk (To Tijuana)
10	MF	ARG	Esteban González (To Tijuana)
99	FW	URU	Diego Chaves (To Veracruz)
--	MF	MEX	Marco Antonio Jiménez (To Tijuana)

=== San Luis ===
In: Note: Flags indicate national team as defined under FIFA eligibility rules; some limited exceptions apply. Players may hold more than one non-FIFA nationality.

No.	Pos.	Nation	Player
2	DF	MEX	Diego Martínez (From Monterrey)
8	MF	URU	Juan Pablo Rodríguez (From Indios)
10	MF	MEX	Gonzalo Pineda (From Guadalajara)
15	DF	MEX	Edwin Hernández (From Indios)
18	FW	MEX	Diego de la Torre (From Toluca)
19	FW	PAN	Blas Pérez (From Tigres, previously on loan to (United Arab Emirates) Al Wasl)
58	MF	HAI	Sony Norde (From (Argentina) Boca Juniors)

Out: Note: Flags indicate national team as defined under FIFA eligibility rules; some limited exceptions apply. Players may hold more than one non-FIFA nationality.

No.	Pos.	Nation	Player
8	MF	ARG	Eduardo Coudet (To (Argentina) Colón)
10	FW	COL	Tressor Moreno (Released)
--	DF	MEX	Omar Monjaraz (Released)
--	DF	MEX	Arturo Alvarado (To Indios)
--	DF	MEX	Leonel Olmedo (To Veracruz)
--	DF	MEX	Adrián García Arias (To Indios)

=== Santos Laguna ===
In: Note: Flags indicate national team as defined under FIFA eligibility rules; some limited exceptions apply. Players may hold more than one non-FIFA nationality.

No.	Pos.	Nation	Player
3	DF	URU	Jonathan Lacerda (From (Uruguay) Wanderers)
8	MF	MEX	Carlos Adrián Morales (From Estudiantes)
23	DF	PAN	Felipe Baloy (From Monterrey)
24	FW	MEX	Oribe Peralta (From Chiapas)
27	DF	MEX	José Antonio Olvera (From Toluca)

Out: Note: Flags indicate national team as defined under FIFA eligibility rules; some limited exceptions apply. Players may hold more than one non-FIFA nationality.

No.	Pos.	Nation	Player
3	MF	ECU	Pedro Quiñónez (Loan to (Ecuador) Emelec)
--	DF	MEX	Christian Sánchez (To Morelia)
--	MF	MEX	Juan Carlos Mosqueda (To Necaxa, previously on loan from América)

=== Toluca ===
In: Note: Flags indicate national team as defined under FIFA eligibility rules; some limited exceptions apply. Players may hold more than one non-FIFA nationality.

No.	Pos.	Nation	Player
8	MF	MEX	Manuel Pérez (Loan from Monterrey)
17	DF	CHI	Osvaldo González (From Universidad de Chile)

Out: Note: Flags indicate national team as defined under FIFA eligibility rules; some limited exceptions apply. Players may hold more than one non-FIFA nationality.

No.	Pos.	Nation	Player
8	MF	MEX	Israel López (Loan return to Cruz Azul)
17	DF	MEX	José Antonio Olvera (To Santos Laguna, previously on loan from Guadalajara)
--	MF	MEX	Diego de la Torre (Loan to San Luis)

=== Tecos ===
In: Note: Flags indicate national team as defined under FIFA eligibility rules; some limited exceptions apply. Players may hold more than one non-FIFA nationality.

No.	Pos.	Nation	Player
5	MF	MEX	Alberto Ramírez (From (Finland) Inter Turku)
9	FW	CHI	Roberto Gutiérrez (From (Chile) Colo-Colo)
19	MF	ARG	César Gradito (From Club Tijuana)

Out: Note: Flags indicate national team as defined under FIFA eligibility rules; some limited exceptions apply. Players may hold more than one non-FIFA nationality.

No.	Pos.	Nation	Player
9	FW	ARG	Bruno Marioni (Retired)
--	MF	MEX	Carlos Adrián Morales (To Santos Laguna)

=== UANL ===
In: Note: Flags indicate national team as defined under FIFA eligibility rules; some limited exceptions apply. Players may hold more than one non-FIFA nationality.

No.	Pos.	Nation	Player
6	MF	MEX	Sergio Amaury Ponce (From Guadalajara)
10	MF	BRA	Éverton Cardoso da Silva (From (Brazil) Flamengo)
22	FW	MEX	Emmanuel Cerda (Loan return from (Peru) Universitario)
23	MF	BRA	Paulo Nagamura (From (United States) Chivas USA)

Out: Note: Flags indicate national team as defined under FIFA eligibility rules; some limited exceptions apply. Players may hold more than one non-FIFA nationality.

No.	Pos.	Nation	Player
6	DF	MEX	Javier Saavedra (To Necaxa)
10	MF	ARG	Gastón Fernández (Released)

=== UNAM ===
In: Note: Flags indicate national team as defined under FIFA eligibility rules; some limited exceptions apply. Players may hold more than one non-FIFA nationality.

No.	Pos.	Nation	Player

Out: Note: Flags indicate national team as defined under FIFA eligibility rules; some limited exceptions apply. Players may hold more than one non-FIFA nationality.

No.	Pos.	Nation	Player

== See also ==
- Primera División de México Bicentenario 2010
