= 2010–11 Club América season =

América
2010–11 season
- Manager: Manuel Lapuente (until February 2011); Carlos Reinoso
- Stadium: Estadio Azteca
- Apertura 2011: 4th (Semifinals)
- Clausura 2012: 6th (Quarterfinals)
- Top goalscorer: League: Apertura: Vicente Matías Vuoso (8) Clausura: Ángel Reyna (13); All: Vicente Matías Vuoso (15)
Home colours	Away colours

The 2010–11 América season was the 64th professional season of Mexico's top-flight football league. The season was split into two tournaments—the Torneo Apertura and the Torneo Clausura—each with identical formats and each contested by the same eighteen teams. América began their season on 24 July 2010 against Pachuca.

== Torneo Apertura ==
=== Squad ===
Note: Flags indicate national team as defined under FIFA eligibility rules; some limited exceptions apply. Players may hold more than one non-FIFA nationality.

No.	Pos.	Nation	Player
1	GK	MEX	Guillermo Ochoa (Captain)
2	DF	MEX	Ismael Rodríguez
3	DF	COL	Aquivaldo Mosquera (Vice-Captain)
4	DF	MEX	Óscar Rojas
5	MF	BRA	Rosinei
6	DF	MEX	Juan Carlos Valenzuela
8	MF	MEX	Israel Martínez
9	FW	MEX	Enrique Esqueda
10	MF	ARG	Daniel Montenegro (vice-captain)
11	FW	URU	Vicente Sánchez
12	GK	MEX	Armando Navarrete
13	MF	MEX	Pável Pardo
14	DF	MEX	Jesús Armando Sánchez

No.	Pos.	Nation	Player
15	DF	MEX	Guillermo Cerda
16	DF	MEX	Diego Cervantes
18	MF	MEX	Ángel Reyna
19	MF	MEX	Miguel Layún
21	MF	MEX	Arnhold Rivas
22	GK	MEX	Leonín Pineda
23	MF	MEX	José Joaquín Martínez
24	FW	MEX	Daniel Márquez
25	MF	MEX	Renato Michell González
26	MF	MEX	Juan Carlos Silva
27	FW	MEX	Tony López
28	MF	MEX	Michel García
30	FW	ARG	Vicente Matías Vuoso

==== Reserve team ====
No.	Pos.	Nation	Player
19	FW	MEX	Taufic Eduardo Guarch
31	MF	MEX	Edgar Morales
32	DF	MEX	Gustavo Antonio Lua
33	DF	MEX	Patricio Treviño
34	GK	MEX	Gabriel Isaac Torres
35	DF	MEX	Heriberto Aguayo
36	DF	MEX	Ivanhue Aguilar
37	DF	MEX	Luis Ramón Valenzuela
38	DF	USA	Edgar David Contreras
39	DF	MEX	George Corral

No.	Pos.	Nation	Player
40	MF	MEX	Isaác Acuña
42	DF	MEX	Alfredo Durán
43	DF	MEX	Marco Antonio Morales
44	MF	MEX	Carlos Alberto Palomares
51	MF	MEX	Christopher Ortega
61	MF	MEX	Ernesto Vazquez
65	DF	MEX	Ademar Rodríguez
75	GK	MEX	Hugo González Durán
113	MF	MEX	Luis Olascoaga Reyes

=== Long-term injuries ===
Note: Flags indicate national team as defined under FIFA eligibility rules; some limited exceptions apply. Players may hold more than one non-FIFA nationality.

No.	Pos.	Nation	Player
10	FW	PAR	Salvador Cabañas

=== Out on loan ===
Note: Flags indicate national team as defined under FIFA eligibility rules; some limited exceptions apply. Players may hold more than one non-FIFA nationality.

No.	Pos.	Nation	Player
-	DF	MEX	David Alejandro Rojina (at Tiburones Rojos)
-	DF	USA	Edgar Castillo (at San Luis F.C.)
-	DF	MEX	Manuel Alejandro García (at San Luis F.C.)
-	DF	MEX	Raúl Alvin Mendoza (at Querétaro F.C.)
-	DF	MEX	Rodrigo Íñigo (at Querétaro F.C.)
-	MF	MEX	Alejandro Argüello (at Tigres)

No.	Pos.	Nation	Player
-	MF	MEX	Alfredo Omar Tena (at Querétaro F.C.)
-	MF	MEX	Juan Carlos Medina (at San Luis F.C.)
-	MF	MEX	Juan Carlos Mosqueda (at Club Necaxa)
-	MF	MEX	Lampros Kontogiannis (at Albinegros)
-	MF	ECU	Luis Saritama (at Deportivo Quito)}

=== Apertura 2010 results ===
==== Regular season ====
July 24, 2010 Round 1	Pachuca	3 – 0	América	Estadio Hidalgo, Pachuca
7:00pm	Martínez 14' (o.g.); Benítez 42' (pen.), 55'	Report		Referee: Miguel Ángel Ortega

August 1, 2010 Round 2	América	3 – 0	Chiapas	Estadio Azteca, Mexico City
4:30pm	Vuoso 7'; Sánchez 68'; Esqueda 90+1'	Report		Referee: Jorge Gasso

August 7, 2010 Round 3	UANL	1 – 1	América	Estadio Universitario, San Nicolás
7:00pm	Álvarez 41'	Report	Montenegro 76'	Referee: Mauricio Morales

August 15, 2010 Round 4	América	1 – 1	Atlas	Estadio Azteca, Mexico City
4:30pm	Vuoso 17'	Report	Fuentes 59'	Referee: Miguel Ángel Flores

August 21, 2010 Round 5	Querétaro	0 – 1	América	Estadio La Corregidora, Querétaro
5:00pm		Report	Montenegro 46'	Referee: Fabricio Morales

August 29, 2010 Round 6	América	1 – 1	Necaxa	Estadio Azteca, Mexico City
4:30pm	Márquez 76'	Report	Gandín 42'	Referee: Juan Genaro Medrano

September 12, 2010 Round 7	Morelia	0 – 2	América	Estadio Morelos, Morelia
12:00pm		Report	Vuoso 5'; Layún 58'	Referee: Ricardo Arellano

September 19, 2010 Round 8	Toluca	2 – 1	América	Estadio Nemesio Díez, Toluca
12:00pm	Mancilla 24'; Zinha 77'	Report	Vuoso 48'	Referee: Armando Archundia

September 26, 2010 Round 9	América	3 – 2	Santos Laguna	Estadio Azteca, Mexico City
4:30pm	Sánchez 23'; Vuoso 30' 37'	Report	Benítez 4'; Fernando Arce 41'	Referee: Jorge Eduardo Gasso

October 2, 2010 Round 10	Cruz Azul	1 – 0	América	Estadio Azul, Mexico City
5:00pm	Giménez 52'	Report		Referee: Marco Antonio Rodriguez

October 10, 2010 Round 11	América	0 – 0	Monterrey	Estadio Azteca, Mexico City
4:30pm		Report		Referee: Juan Genaro Medrano

October 17, 2010 Round 12	Puebla	2 – 2	América	Estadio Cuauhtémoc, Puebla
12:00pm	Pereyra 25' 82'	Report	Márquez 9' 40'	Referee: Miguel Angel Flores

October 24, 2010 Round 13	América	0 – 0	Guadalajara	Estadio Azteca, Mexico City
4:30pm		Report		Referee: Ricardo Arellano

October 28, 2010 Round 14	San Luis	1 – 2	América	Estadio Alfonso Lastras, San Luis Potosí
8:30pm	Lojero 78'	Report	Montenegro 68'; Vuoso 85'	Referee: Jaime Herrera

October 31, 2010 Round 15	América	4 – 1	Estudiantes Tecos	Estadio Azteca, Mexico City
4:30pm	Márquez 43' 84'; Sánchez 45'; Montenegro 47'	Report	Cejas 54'	Referee: Jesús Fabricio Morales

November 6, 2010 Round 16	Atlante	0 – 1	América	Estadio Andrés Quintana Roo, Cancún
9:00pm		Report	Vuoso 65'	Referee: Jorge Isaac Rojas

November 13, 2010 Round 17	América	0 – 1	UNAM	Estadio Azteca, Mexico City
4:30pm		Report	Verón 11'	Referee: Miguel Ángel Ayala

==== Final Phase ====
November 17, 2010 Quarterfinals	San Luis	0 – 0	América	Estadio Alfonso Lastras, San Luis Potosí
7:00pm		Report		Referee: Jaime Herrera

November 20, 2010 Quarterfinals	América	4 – 1	San Luis	Estadio Azteca, Mexico City
7:00pm	Sánchez 15'; Matellán 24' (o.g.); Esqueda 45'; Vuoso 81'	Report	de la Torre 53'	Referee: Francisco Chacón

América won 4-1 on aggregate

November 25, 2010 Semifinals	América	1 – 2	Santos Laguna	Estadio Azteca, Mexico City
7:00pm	Reyna 19'	Report	Quintero 9'; Benítez 89'	Referee: Jaime Herrera

=== Goalscorers ===
Position	Nation	Name	Goals scored
1	(Mexico)	Vicente Matías Vuoso	8
2	(Mexico)	Daniel Márquez	5
3	(Argentina)	Daniel Montenegro	4
4	(Uruguay)	Vicente Sánchez	3
5	(Mexico)	Enrique Esqueda	1
5	(Mexico)	Miguel Layún	1
TOTAL			22

=== Results ===
==== Results summary ====
Overall								Home						Away					
Pld	W	D	L	GF	GA	GD	Pts	W	D	L	GF	GA	GD	W	D	L	GF	GA	GD
17	7	6	4	22	16	+6	27	3	4	1	12	6	+6	4	2	3	10	10	0

Last updated: 30 December 2010.
Source: Regular season

===== Results by round =====
Round	1	2	3	4	5	6	7	8	9	10	11	12	13	14	15	16	17
Ground	A	H	A	H	A	H	A	A	H	A	H	A	H	A	H	A	H
Result	L	W	D	D	W	D	W	L	W	L	D	D	D	W	W	W	L
Position	18	9	11	9	7	8	4	6	5	6	6	6	8	6	5	4	4

Updated to match(es) played on 30 December 2010. Source: Apertura 2010 results and mediotiempo.com
A = Away; H = Home; W = Win; D = Draw; L = Loss

== Torneo Clausura ==
=== Current squad ===
Note: Flags indicate national team as defined under FIFA eligibility rules; some limited exceptions apply. Players may hold more than one non-FIFA nationality.

No.	Pos.	Nation	Player
1	GK	MEX	Guillermo Ochoa (captain)
3	DF	COL	Aquivaldo Mosquera
4	DF	MEX	Óscar Rojas
5	MF	BRA	Rosinei
6	DF	MEX	Juan Carlos Valenzuela
7	MF	URU	Nicolás Olivera
8	MF	MEX	Israel Martínez
9	FW	MEX	Enrique Esqueda
10	MF	ARG	Daniel Montenegro
11	FW	URU	Vicente Sánchez
12	GK	MEX	Armando Navarrete

No.	Pos.	Nation	Player
13	MF	MEX	Pável Pardo (vice-captain)
15	DF	MEX	Rodrigo Íñigo
16	DF	MEX	Diego Cervantes
18	MF	MEX	Ángel Reyna
19	MF	MEX	Miguel Layún
23	MF	MEX	José Joaquín Martínez
24	FW	MEX	Daniel Márquez
27	FW	MEX	Antonio López
30	FW	ARG	Vicente Matías Vuoso
33	DF	MEX	Patricio Treviño

=== Reserve team ===
No.	Pos.	Nation	Player
25	MF	MEX	Renato Michell González
32	GK	MEX	Hugo Alfonso González
34	MF	MEX	Elohe Israel Solórzano
35	MF	MEX	Julio César Robledo

No.	Pos.	Nation	Player
39	DF	MEX	George Ulises Corral
43	FW	MEX	Lugiani Gallardo
51	MF	MEX	Luis Olascoaga
134	DF	MEX	Diego Antonio Reyes

=== Out on loan ===
Note: Flags indicate national team as defined under FIFA eligibility rules; some limited exceptions apply. Players may hold more than one non-FIFA nationality.

No.	Pos.	Nation	Player
-	GK	MEX	Leonín Pineda (at Club Tijuana)
-	DF	MEX	David Alejandro Rojina (at Tiburones Rojos)
-	DF	USA	Edgar Castillo (at Puebla F.C.)
-	DF	MEX	Ismael Rodríguez (at Querétaro F.C.)
-	DF	MEX	Manuel Alejandro García (at San Luis F.C.)
-	DF	MEX	Raúl Alvin Mendoza (at Querétaro F.C.)
-	MF	MEX	Alejandro Argüello (at Puebla F.C.)

No.	Pos.	Nation	Player
-	MF	USA	Isaac Acuña (at Querétaro F.C.)
-	MF	MEX	Juan Carlos Medina (at San Luis F.C.)
-	MF	MEX	Juan Carlos Mosqueda (at Club Necaxa)
-	MF	MEX	Juan Carlos Silva (at Club Necaxa)
-	MF	MEX	Lampros Kontogiannis (at Albinegros)
-	MF	ECU	Luis Saritama (at Deportivo Quito)

=== Clausura 2011 results ===
==== Regular season ====
January 9, 2011 Round 1	América	0 – 2	Pachuca	Estadio Azteca, Mexico City
4:00pm		Report	Anchico 24'; Benítez 66'	Referee: José Alfredo Peñaloza

January 15, 2011 Round 2	Chiapas	2 – 2	América	Estadio Víctor Manuel Reyna, Tuxtla Gutierrez
5:00pm	Valdéz 29'; Razo 64'	Report	Vuoso 57' (pen.); Olivera 90+3'	Referee: Julio David Escobar

January 23, 2011 Round 3	América	1 – 2	UANL	Estadio Azteca, Mexico City
4:00pm	Montenegro 51'	Report	Lobos 35'; Mancilla 90+2'	Referee: Ricardo Arellano

January 29, 2011 Round 4	Atlas	0 – 2	América	Estadio Jalisco, Guadalajara
8:45pm		Report	Vuoso 70'; Reyna 84'	Referee: Jorge Eduardo Gasso

February 6, 2011 Round 5	América	3 – 1	Querétaro	Estadio Azteca, Mexico City
4:00pm	Márquez 16'; Vuoso 40'; Mosqueda 86'	Report	Nava 53'	Referee: Miguel Ángel Chacón

February 11, 2011 Round 6	Necaxa	1 – 0	América	Estadio Victoria, Aguascalientes
8:10pm	Blanco 35'	Report		Referee: Roberto García Orozco

February 20, 2011 Round 7	América	1 – 2	Morelia	Estadio Azteca, Mexico City
4:00pm	Sánchez 55'	Report	Márquez Lugo 1'; Rojas 41'	Referee: Jorge Isaac Rojas

February 27, 2011 Round 8	América	4 – 3	Toluca	Estadio Azteca, Mexico City
4:00pm	Reyna 43'; Mosquera 50'; Montenegro 53'; Sánchez 68'	Report	González 46'; Novaretti 52', 90+1'	Referee: Mauricio Morales

March 5, 2011 Round 9	Santos Laguna	2 – 3	América	Estadio Corona, Torreón
7:00PM	Peralta 30', 65'	Report	Reyna 52', 89'; Sánchez 62'	Referee: Miguel Ángel Ortega

March 13, 2011 Round 10	América	0 – 2	Cruz Azul	Estadio Azteca, Mexico City
6:00pm		Report	Villa 16', 19'	Referee: Miguel Ángel Ayala

March 19, 2011 Round 11	Monterrey	2 – 1	América	Estadio Tecnológico, Monterrey
5:00pm	Ayoví 47'; Carreño 69'	Report	Reyna 89' (pen.)	Referee: Francisco Chacón

April 3, 2011 Round 12	América	5 – 4	Puebla	Estadio Azteca, Mexico City
4:00pm	Reyna 13', 19', 33'; Sánchez 22', 71'	Report	Borja 42'; Juárez 57'; Acosta 67'; Pereyra 74'	Referee: Paul Delgadillo

April 10, 2011 Round 13	Guadalajara	3 – 0	América	Estadio Omnilife, Zapopan
8:00pm	Torres 28'; Fabián 72', 79'	Report		Referee: Erim Ramírez

February 2, 2011 Round 14	América	3 – 0	San Luis	Estadio Azteca, Mexico City
8:30pm	Vuoso 45' (pen.), 69' (pen.); Reyna 50'	Report		Referee: Marco Antonio Rodríguez

April 17, 2011 Round 15	Estudiantes Tecos	1 – 3	América	Estadio Tres de Marzo, Zapopan
5:00pm	Alanis 40'		Reyes 49'; Reyna 59', 85'	Referee: Francisco Chacón

April 24, 2011 Round 16	América	1 – 1	Atlante	Estadio Azteca, Mexico City
4:00pm	Reyna 35'	Report	Maldonado 38'	Referee: Mauricio Morales

May 1, 2011 Round 17	UNAM	0 – 2	América	Estadio Olímpico Universitario, Mexico City
12:00pm		Report	Vuoso 59'; Reyna 90+1'	Referee: Ricardo Arellano

==== Final phase ====
May 5, 2011 Quarterfinals	América	1 – 2	Morelia	Estadio Corregidora, Querétaro
9:00pm	Márquez 70'	Report	M. Pérez 16'; Márquez 61'	Referee: Paul Delgadillo

May 8, 2011 Quarterfinals	Morelia	3 – 2	América	Estadio Morelos, Morelia
8:00pm	Rojas 31', 60'; Márquez 47' (pen.)	Report	Reyes 4'; Vuoso 65'	Referee: Marco Antonio Rodríguez

Morelia won 5–3 on aggregate

=== Goalscorers ===
Position	Nation	Name	Goals scored
1.	(Mexico)	Ángel Reyna	13
2.	(Argentina)	Vicente Matías Vuoso	7
3.	(Uruguay)	Vicente Sánchez	6
4	(Mexico)	Daniel Márquez	2
4	(Argentina)	Daniel Montenegro	2
4	(Colombia)	Aquivaldo Mosquera	2
4	(Mexico)	Diego Antonio Reyes	1
8	(Uruguay)	Nicolás Olivera	1
TOTAL			34

=== Results ===
==== Results summary ====
Overall								Home						Away					
Pld	W	D	L	GF	GA	GD	Pts	W	D	L	GF	GA	GD	W	D	L	GF	GA	GD
17	9	2	6	31	28	+3	29	4	1	4	18	17	+1	5	1	2	13	11	+2

Last updated: 6 May 2011.
Source: Clausura 2011 results

===== Results by round =====
Round	1	2	3	4	5	6	7	8	9	10	11	12	13	14	15	16	17
Ground	H	A	H	A	H	A	H	H	A	H	A	H	A	H	A	H	A
Result	L	D	L	W	W	L	L	W	W	L	L	W	L	W	W	D	W
Position	16	14	16	12	7	12	13	11	4	6	8	6	8	8	8	9	6

Updated to match(es) played on 6 May 2011. Source: Clausura 2011 results and mediotiempo.com
A = Away; H = Home; W = Win; D = Draw; L = Loss
