= 2010–11 Querétaro F.C. season =

The 2010–11 Querétaro season was the 64th professional season of Mexico's top-flight football league. The season is split into two tournaments—the Torneo Apertura and the Torneo Clausura—each with identical formats and each contested by the same eighteen teams. Querétaro began their season on July 24, 2010, against UANL, Querétaro played their homes games on Saturdays at 5:00pm.

== Torneo Apertura ==
=== Squad ===
Note: Flags indicate national team as defined under FIFA eligibility rules; some limited exceptions apply. Players may hold more than one non-FIFA nationality.

No.	Pos.	Nation	Player
1	GK	MEX	Jorge Díaz de León
2	DF	MEX	Rodrigo Íñigo
3	DF	MEX	Joaquín Beltrán (captain)
4	DF	MEX	Alessandro Luna
5	DF	MEX	Eder Borelli
6	MF	MEX	José Aceves
7	DF	MEX	Carlos Pinto
8	FW	MEX	Julio Nava
9	FW	BIH	Alen Škoro
10	FW	URU	Sergio Blanco
11	FW	MEX	Isaac Romo
12	FW	MEX	Victor Villa
13	MF	MEX	Alvin Mendoza
14	DF	MEX	Raúl Rico

No.	Pos.	Nation	Player
15	DF	URU	Adrián Romero
16	MF	URU	Sergio Órteman
17	MF	MEX	Gabino Velasco
18	MF	MEX	Alisael Lortia
19	FW	MEX	Miguel Angel Morales
20	DF	MEX	Ricardo Alcalá
21	DF	MEX	Héctor Altamirano
22	MF	MEX	Alfredo Tena
23	DF	MEX	Daniel Valdéz
24	MF	MEX	Emilio López
25	DF	MEX	Jorge Cárdenas
26	DF	MEX	Carlos Canales
58	MF	MEX	Marco Gómez
73	GK	ARG	Carlos Bossio

=== Regular season ===
July 24, 2010 Round 1	UANL	0 – 1	Querétaro	Estadio Universitario, San Nicolás
7:00pm		Report	Blanco 45'	Referee: Ricardo Arellano

July 31, 2010 Round 2	Querétaro	2 – 1	Atlas	Estadio La Corregidora, Querétaro
5:00pm	Blanco 55'; Nava 57'	Report	Vidrio 89'	Referee: Julio Escobar

August 8, 2010 Round 3	Morelia	6 – 0	Querétaro	Estadio Morelos, Morelia
12:00pm	Sabah 7', 24', 54' (pen.); Hernández 36'; Rey 41' (pen.); Márquez Lugo 85'	Report		Referee: Paul Delgadillo

August 13, 2010 Round 4	Necaxa	1 – 1	Querétaro	Estadio Victoria, Aguascalientes
8:00pm	Quatrocchi 26'	Report	Altamirano 60'	Referee: Jorege Gasso

August 21, 2010 Round 5	Querétaro	0 – 1	América	Estadio La Corregidora, Querétaro
5:00pm		Report	Montenegro 46'	Referee: Fabricio Morales

August 29, 2010 Round 6	Toluca	2 – 0	Querétaro	Estadio Nemesio Díez, Toluca
12:00pm	Méndez 37'; Mancilla 80' (pen.)	Report		Referee: Mauricio Morales

September 11, 2010 Round 7	Querétaro	5 – 2	Santos Laguna	Estadio La Corregidora, Querétaro
5:00pm	Beltrán 27'; Blanco 45', 69', 87'; Altamirano 90'	Report	Benítez 4'; Borelli 71' (o.g.)	Referee: Miguel Ángel Flores

September 18, 2010 Round 8	Cruz Azul	3 – 0	Querétaro	Estadio Azul, Mexico City, Mexico
5:00PM	Villa 27'; Biancucchi 33'; Cortés 90+1'	Report		Referee: Fernando Guerrero

September 25, 2010 Round 9	Querétaro	0 – 0	Monterrey	Estadio La Corregidora, Querétaro
5:00pm		Report		Referee: Marco Antonio Rodríguez

October 3, 2010 Round 10	Puebla	2 – 0	Querétaro	Estadio Cuauhtémoc, Puebla
12:00pm	Olivera 65'; Salinas 70'	Report		Referee: Jorge Gasso

October 9, 2010 Round 11	Querétaro	2 – 2	Guadalajara	Estadio La Corregidora, Querétaro
5:00pm	López 57'; Altamirano 84' (pen.)	Report	Sánchez 59'; Fabián 74'	Referee: José Alfredo Peñaloza

October 16, 2010 Round 12	San Luis	3 – 2	Querétaro	Estadio Alfonso Lastras, San Luis Potosí
5:00pm	Medina 1'; Arroyo 34'; González 80'	Report	Nava 14'; Blanco 32'	Referee: Roberto García

October 23, 2010 Round 13	Querétaro	1 – 0	Estudiantes Tecos	Estadio La Corregidora, Querétaro
5:00pm	Blanco 67'	Report		Referee: Rafael Medina

October 27, 2010 Round 14	Atlante	1 – 0	Querétaro	Estadio Andrés Quintana Roo, Cancún
9:00pm	Fano 53'	Report		Referee: Mauricio Morales

October 30, 2010 Round 15	Querétaro	2 – 1	UNAM	Estadio La Corregidora, Querétaro
5:00pm	Blanco 24'; Škoro 90+4'	Report		Referee: Armando Archundia

November 6, 2010 Round 16	Pachuca	2 – 1	Querétaro	Estadio Hidalgo, Pachuca
7:00pm	Cvitanich 9'; Cárdenas 60' (o.g.)	Report	Romero 20'	Referee: Miguel Ángel Flores

November 13, 2010 Round 17	Querétaro	1 – 1	Chiapas	Estadio Victor Manuel Reyna, Tuxtla Gutierrez
5:00pm	Órteman 79'	Report	Rodríguez 79'	Referee: Ricardo Arellano

=== Goalscorers ===
Position	Nation	Name	Goals scored
1	(Uruguay)	Sergio Blanco	8
2	(Mexico)	Héctor Altamirano	3
3	(Mexico)	Julio Nava	2
4	(Mexico)	Joaquín Beltrán	1
4	(Mexico)	Emilio López	1
4	(Uruguay)	Sergio Órteman	1
4	(Uruguay)	Adrián Romero	1
4	(Bosnia and Herzegovina)	Alen Škoro	1
TOTAL			18

== Transfers ==
=== In ===
#	Pos	Player	From	Fee	Date	Notes

=== Out ===
Pos	Player	To	Fee	Date	Notes

=== Results ===
==== Results summary ====
Overall								Home						Away					
Pld	W	D	L	GF	GA	GD	Pts	W	D	L	GF	GA	GD	W	D	L	GF	GA	GD
17	5	4	8	18	28	−10	19	4	3	1	13	8	+5	1	1	7	5	20	−15

Last updated: 15 January 2011.
Source: Apertura 2010 results

==== Results by round ====
Round	1	2	3	4	5	6	7	8	9	10	11	12	13	14	15	16	17
Ground	A	H	A	A	H	A	H	A	H	A	H	A	H	A	H	A	H
Result	W	W	L	D	L	L	W	L	D	L	D	L	W	L	W	L	D
Position	5	3	7	5	9	11	10	11	12	14	15	15	14	15	12	14	14

Updated to match(es) played on 15 January 2011. Source: Apertura 2010 results and mediotiempo.com
A = Away; H = Home; W = Win; D = Draw; L = Loss

== Torneo Clausura ==
=== Squad ===
Note: Flags indicate national team as defined under FIFA eligibility rules; some limited exceptions apply. Players may hold more than one non-FIFA nationality.

No.	Pos.	Nation	Player
1	GK	MEX	Jorge Díaz de León
2	DF	COL	Efraín Cortés
3	DF	MEX	Juan Antonio Ocampo
4	DF	MEX	Alessandro Luna
5	MF	MEX	Éder Borelli
6	MF	MEX	José Octavio Aceves
7	MF	MEX	Sergio Ávila
8	FW	MEX	Julio Nava
9	FW	URU	Carlos Bueno
10	MF	MEX	Jorge Ibarra
11	FW	MEX	Arnhold Rivas
12	FW	MEX	Víctor Villa
13	MF	MEX	Alvin Mendoza
14	DF	MEX	Raúl Rico
15	DF	URU	Adrián Romero
16	MF	USA	Isaac Acuña

No.	Pos.	Nation	Player
17	MF	MEX	Gabino Velasco
18	MF	MEX	Alisael Lortia
19	FW	MEX	Miguel Ángel Morales
20	DF	MEX	Ricardo Alcalá
21	DF	MEX	Héctor Altamirano (captain)
22	MF	URU	Raúl Ferro
23	DF	MEX	Daniel Valdez
24	MF	MEX	Emilio López
25	MF	MEX	Jorge Cárdenas
27	FW	MEX	Ricardo Balderas
32	DF	MEX	Ismael Rodríguez
36	DF	MEX	Diego García
37	DF	MEX	Luis Daniel Cano
58	MF	MEX	Marco Antonio Gómez
60	GK	MEX	Jorge Bernal
73	GK	MEX	Javier Romo

=== Regular season ===
January 8, 2011 Round 1	Querétaro	2 – 2	UANL	Estadio Corregidora, Querétaro
5:00pm	Bueno 19', 56'	Report	Danilinho 71'; Lobos 77'	Referee: Francisco Chacón

January 15, 2011 Round 2	Atlas	2 – 1	Querétaro	Estadio Jalisco, Guadalajara
8:45pm	Pacheco 37'; Moreno 81'	Report	Bueno 49'	Referee: Jaime Herrera

January 22, 2011 Round 3	Querétaro	0 – 3	Morelia	Estadio Corregidora, Querétaro
5:00pm		Report	Márquez 56'; Lozano 80' (pen.); Hernández 90+1'	Referee: Mauricio Morales

January 29, 2011 Round 4	Querétaro	1 – 0	Necaxa	Estadio Corregidora, Querétaro
5:00pm	Cortés 59'	Report		Referee: Juan Genaro Medrano

February 6, 2011 Round 5	América	3 – 1	Querétaro	Estadio Azteca, Mexico City
4:00pm	Márquez 16'; Vuoso 40'; Mosqueda 86'	Report	Nava 53'	Referee: Miguel Ángel Chacón

February 12, 2011 Round 6	Querétaro	0 – 5	Toluca	Estadio Corregidora, Querétaro
5:00pm		Report	Sinha 28'; González 49'; Cortés 57' (o.g.); Ayoví 64'; Calderón 89'	Referee: Paul Delgadillo

February 19, 2011 Round 7	Santos Laguna	0 – 2	Querétaro	Estadio Corona, Torreón
7:00pm		Report	Acuña 2'; Bueno 42'	Referee: Marco Antonio Rodríguez

February 26, 2011 Round 8	Querétaro	1 – 1	Cruz Azul	Estadio Corregidora, Querétaro
5:00pm	Acuña 7'	Report	Romo 32'	Referee: Jorge Isaac Rojas

March 5, 2011 Round 9	Monterrey	2 – 0	Querétaro	Estadio Tecnológico, Monterrey
5:00pm	Carreño 48'; Pérez 74'	Report		Referee: Mauricio Morales

March 12, 2011 Round 10	Querétaro	2 – 1	Puebla	Estadio Corregidora, Querétaro
5:00pm	Borelli 27'; Acuña 37'	Report	González 52'	Referee: Miguel Ángel Ortega

March 19, 2011 Round 11	Guadalajara	2 – 0	Querétaro	Estadio Omnilife, Zapopan
7:00pm	Torres 5', 71'	Report		Referee: Juan Genaro Medrano

April 2, 2011 Round 12	Querétaro	3 – 2	San Luis	Estadio Corregidora, Querétaro
5:00pm	López 28'; Bueno 33', 86'	Report	Mares 7'; Cuevas 21'	Referee: Francisco Chacón

April 8, 2011 Round 13	Estudiantes Tecos	0 – 0	Querétaro	Estadio Tres de Marzo, Zapopan
8:10pm		Report		Referee: Ricardo Arellano

April 13, 2011 Round 14	Querétaro	1 – 4	Atlante	Estadio Corregidora, Querétaro
8:00pm	Bueno 85' (pen.)	Report	Diego 19'; Ortiz 21'; Bermúdez 28'; Amione 63'	Referee: José Alfredo Peñaloza

April 17, 2011 Round 15	UNAM	3 – 0	Querétaro	Estadio Olímpico Universitario, Mexico City
12:00pm	Palenica 10', 19'; López 44'	Report		Referee: Roberto García Orozco

April 23, 2011 Round 16	Querétaro	1 – 1	Pachuca	Estadio Corregidora, Querétaro
5:00pm	Bueno 90'	Report	Gómez 28'	Referee: Juan Genaro Medrano

April 30, 2011 Round 17	Chiapas	4 – 1	Querétaro	Estadio Victor Manuel Reyna, Tuxtla Gutierrez
5:00pm	Fuentes 47'; Rodríguez 55'; Martínez 78' (pen.), 90+2'	Report	Bueno 16'	Referee: Miguel Ángel Chacón

=== Goalscorers ===
Position	Nation	Name	Goals scored
1	(Uruguay)	Carlos Bueno	9
2	(United States)	Isaác Acuña	3
3	(Mexico)	Eder Borelli	1
3	(Colombia)	Efraín Cortes	1
3	(Mexico)	Emilio López	1
3	(Mexico)	Julio Nava	1
TOTAL			16

=== Results ===
==== Results summary ====
Overall								Home						Away					
Pld	W	D	L	GF	GA	GD	Pts	W	D	L	GF	GA	GD	W	D	L	GF	GA	GD
17	4	4	9	16	35	−19	16	3	3	3	11	19	−8	1	1	6	5	16	−11

Last updated: 6 May 2011.
Source: Clausura 2011 results

==== Results by round ====
Round	1	2	3	4	5	6	7	8	9	10	11	12	13	14	15	16	17
Ground	H	A	H	H	A	H	A	H	A	H	A	H	A	H	A	H	A
Result	D	L	L	W	L	L	W	D	L	W	L	W	D	L	L	D	L
Position	7	13	17	14	17	18	16	15	18	14	15	13	14	15	16	16	16

Updated to match(es) played on 23 April 2011. Source: Clausura 2011 results and mediotiempo.com
A = Away; H = Home; W = Win; D = Draw; L = Loss
