= Guillermo Ochoa =

Mexican footballer (born 1985)

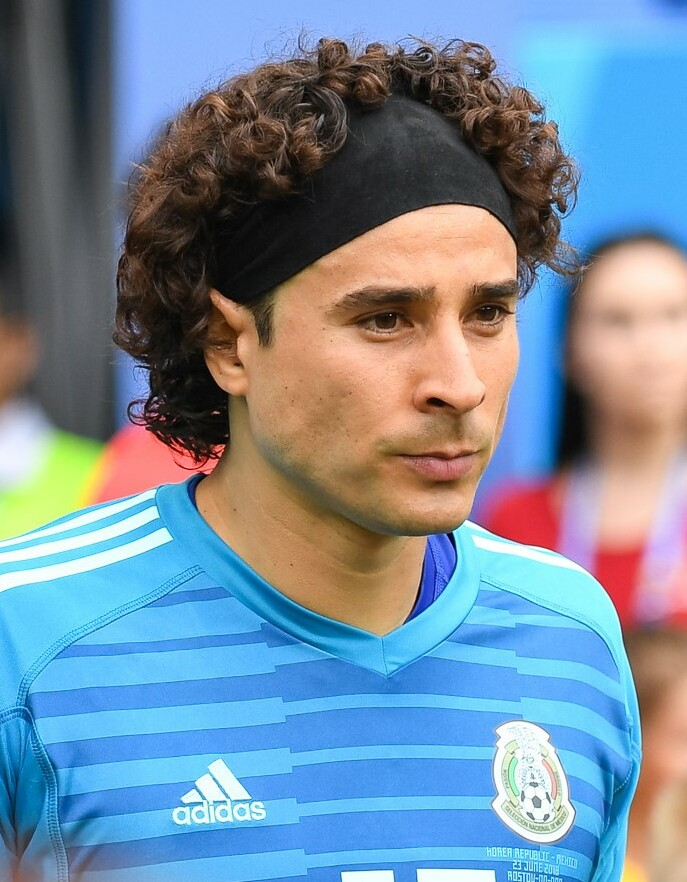
- Ochoa with Mexico at the 2018 FIFA World Cup

Personal information
- Full name: Francisco Guillermo Ochoa Magaña
- Date of birth: 13 July 1985 (age 41)
- Place of birth: Guadalajara, Jalisco, Mexico
- Height: 1.90 m (6 ft 3 in)
- Position: Goalkeeper

Youth career
- 1995–2005: América

Senior career*
Years	Team	Apps	(Gls)
2003	Tigrillos Coapa	12	(0)
2004–2011	América	239	(0)
2004	→ San Luis (loan)	1	(0)
2011–2014	Ajaccio	112	(0)
2014–2017	Málaga	11	(0)
2016–2017	→ Granada (loan)	38	(0)
2017–2019	Standard Liège	78	(0)
2019–2022	América	118	(0)
2022–2024	Salernitana	41	(0)
2024–2025	AVS	23	(0)
2025–2026	AEL Limassol	22	(0)
Total		695	(0)

International career
2004–2012	Mexico U23	6	(0)
2021	Mexico Olympic (O.P.)	6	(0)
2005–2026	Mexico	154	(0)
Medal record
Men's football
Representing Mexico
Olympic Games
Bronze medal – third place	2020 Tokyo	Team
Copa América
Third place	2007 Venezuela
CONCACAF Gold Cup
Winner	2009 United States
Winner	2011 United States
Winner	2015 United States–Canada
Winner	2019 United States
Winner	2023 United States–Canada
Winner	2025 United States–Canada
Runner-up	2007 United States
CONCACAF Nations League
Winner	2025 United States
Runner-up	2021 United States
Runner-up	2024 United States
Third place	2023 United States
- * Club domestic league appearances and goals

Francisco Guillermo Ochoa Magaña (Spanish pronunciation: [ɡiˈʝeɾmo oˈtʃo.a]; born 13 July 1985), commonly known as Memo Ochoa, is a Mexican former professional footballer who played as a goalkeeper. He was a full international with the Mexico national team for 21 years retiring in 2026, which he captained, and is widely considered to be the greatest Mexican goalkeeper of all time.

At club level, Ochoa made his professional debut with América in 2004, where he won the Clausura 2005 league title, the 2005 Campeón de Campeones and the 2006 CONCACAF Champions' Cup. He moved to Europe in 2011, playing for Ajaccio in France, Malaga and Granada in Spain and Standard Liège in Belgium, where he won the 2017–18 Belgian Cup. He returned to América in 2019, setting a club record for the most clean sheets, before returning to Europe with spells at Salernitana in Italy, AVS in Portugal, and AEL Limassol in Cyprus. Over his career, he made more than 750 senior club appearances.

Ochoa received his first cap for Mexico at age 20 in a friendly match against Hungary. He was selected for six consecutive FIFA World Cup squads between 2006 and 2026, joining a select group of players to achieve the feat. His international career also included appearances at two FIFA Confederations Cups, two Olympic tournaments (winning a bronze medal in 2020), two Copas América, one Toulon Tournament, one CONCACAF Pre-Olympic Tournament, four CONCACAF Nations Leagues and seven CONCACAF Gold Cups. Winning six Gold Cup titles, he is the most successful player in the tournament's history. Prior to the start of the 2026 World Cup, Ochoa announced his intention to retire from professional football at the end of Mexico's run, concluding his career following their elimination in the round of 16.

== Club career ==
=== América ===
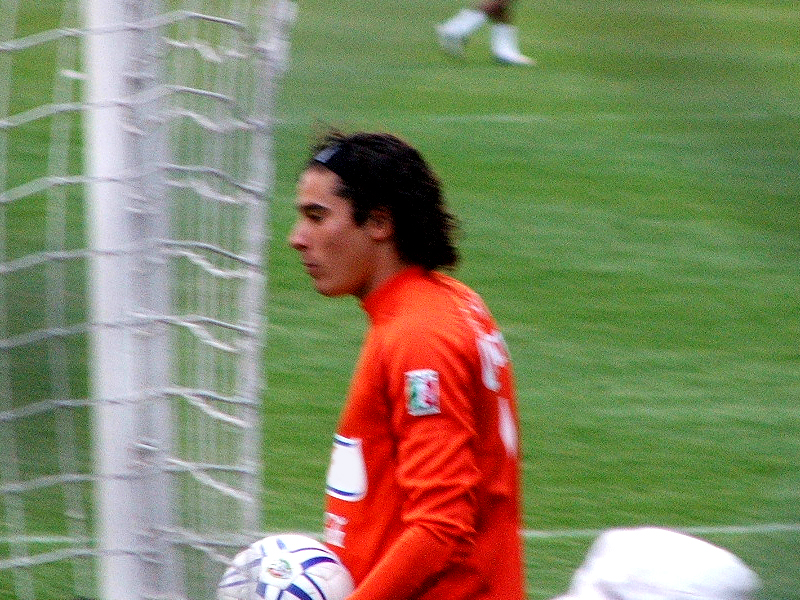
Ochoa with América in 2006

Guillermo Ochoa made his debut with América during the Clausura 2004 tournament against Monterrey, being only 18 years old when called up by head coach Leo Beenhakker. Ochoa quickly demonstrated his skill and talent in goal, and the young goalkeeper was thrust into the spotlight to replace injured veteran Adolfo Ríos. He would then share the starting job with Ríos after he recovered from his aforementioned injury. At the conclusion of his first season, he won the Rookie of the Tournament award.

When the Apertura 2004 tournament began, Ochoa was thought to be the heir apparent to Ríos, who had retired. However, new head coach Oscar Ruggeri brought new goalkeepers with him, among them Argentine Sebastián Saja. Ruggeri's stay at the club was marred by controversy and unpopular decisions. He was fired after only six games into the season and Ochoa was soon reinstated by new coach Mario Carrillo. Thereafter, he started every game for Club América save for incidents involving injuries or national team duty. Under Carrillo, Ochoa won his first championship with América following the Clausura 2005 season. He also won the 2005 Campeón de Campeones and the 2006 CONCACAF Champions' Cup with América. His high-level domestic performances during this period culminated in him winning consecutive Golden Glove awards for the 2006–07 season.

The peak of Ochoa's first stint with América arrived in October 2007, when he was included in France Football's shortlist for the Ballon d'Or. He made history as the first Mexican player ever nominated for the prestigious award, finishing 30th overall in the global voting and standing out as one of only three candidates on the shortlist who did not play for a European club at the time. He sustained this elite form into early 2008, helping América win the InterLiga tournament with excellent performances, most notably in the group match against Monarcas Morelia, where he saved a late penalty kick, preserving América's 1–0 lead. By the winter of 2010, his performances drew substantial transfer interest from abroad, with British media widely reporting that Manchester United were heavily tracking the goalkeeper for the 2011–12 season. Ochoa ultimately concluded his first era with Club América at the end of the Clausura 2011 tournament, following a quarter-final defeat to Monarcas Morelia, before completing his highly anticipated move to Europe.

=== Ajaccio ===
==== 2011–12 season ====
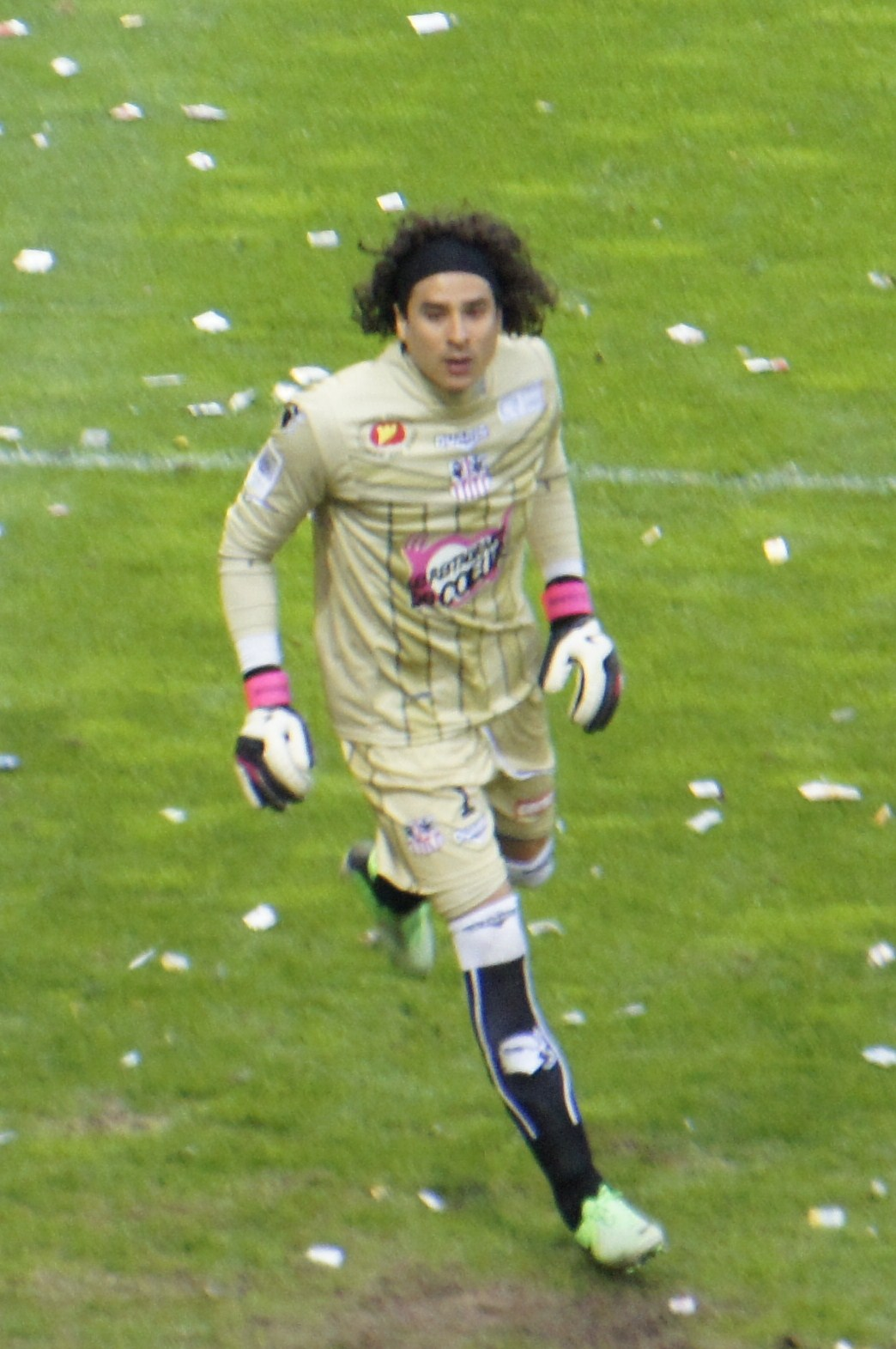
Ochoa with Ajaccio in 2011

On 4 July 2011, Ochoa signed a three-year contract, with an additional one-year option, with French club Ajaccio, recently promoted to Ligue 1. He played in his first two friendlies with Ajaccio against Bordeaux and Real Sociedad, losing 1–2 and 0–4 respectively.

Ochoa made his official club debut on 5 August 2011 against Toulouse, losing 0–2. On 18 and 21 December, Ajaccio won two games in a row, with Ochoa keeping two consecutive clean-sheets, his third clean-sheet in total of the season. Ochoa also contributed in 3–0 victory against Étoile Fréjus Saint-Raphaël in the Coupe de France. On 14 January 2012, he helped Ajaccio with a 2–1 victory over Auxerre, and on 21 January, he played against Valenciennes in a 2–1 victory which put Ajaccio out of the relegation zone since the start of the season. Ajaccio won its sixth game with Ochoa in a 2–1 home win against Dijon. For the last game of the season, Ajaccio needed a win against Toulouse to escape the relegation zone. Ochoa started and played 90 minutes against Toulouse and helped Ajaccio win 2–0 to stay in Ligue 1. Ochoa finished his first season with 8 clean sheets, 43 saves and 151 blocks. He also finished the Ligue 1 season with 59 goals conceded, making him—along with Caen goalkeeper Alexis Thébaux—the most scored-on goalkeeper of the season. AC Ajaccio fans voted him as Player of the Season.

==== 2012–13 season ====
On 1 July, Ajaccio club president Alain Orsoni announced Ochoa would stay for the 2012–13 season amidst rumoured interest from clubs such as Fenerbahçe and Sevilla, but neither the clubs nor Ochoa's manager could come to a solid agreement.

On 11 August, Ochoa started and played against Nice in a 1–0 away win for their first game and win for the season. On 19 August, Ochoa played in Ajaccio's 0–0 draw at home against Paris Saint-Germain, in which he played a big part by keeping a clean sheet. In the third match of the season, Ochoa played 60 minutes against Valenciennes in which he had to be substituted out due to a collision with a teammate. Ajaccio lost the match 0–3. Ochoa finished the season with 12 clean sheets. He was voted again by fans as Player of the Season.

==== 2013–14 season ====
Ochoa started in Ajaccio's first game of the season on 11 August 2013 against Saint-Étienne. Ajaccio lost 0–1. On 18 August, Ochoa played all 90 minutes against Paris Saint-Germain at the Parc des Princes, with Ajaccio taking an early 1–0 advantage, though an Edinson Cavani goal in the 86th minute cost Ajaccio a famous victory, instead having to settle for a 1–1 draw. Ochoa's performance was praised, with many noting the Mexican had saved 12 of PSG's 39 total shots.

On 18 January 2014, Ochoa played his 100th match in Europe in Ajaccio's 0–2 away loss to Nice. Following a 1–2 defeat to Bastia on 20 April, Ajaccio were officially relegated to Ligue 2 after spending three years in the top flight. Ochoa played his final match with the club on 17 May in a 1–3 defeat to Saint-Étienne. After officially announcing his departure, the club bid farewell to Ochoa in an open letter on social media.

=== Málaga ===
==== 2014–15 season ====
Following his standout performances at the 2014 FIFA World Cup, Ochoa signed a three-year contract with Spanish La Liga club Málaga on 1 August 2014. Despite arriving with high expectations and participating in pre-season, he found himself relegated to the substitutes' bench, as manager Javi Gracia preferred Carlos Kameni as his first-choice goalkeeper. Ochoa eventually made his competitive debut for the club on 3 December in a 1–1 Copa del Rey draw against Deportivo de La Coruña, but returned to the bench in the following league game.

By early November, his lack of playing time drew public frustration from Mexico national team manager Miguel Herrera, who expressed displeasure with his first-choice goalkeeper receiving limited playing time, and sparked widespread media speculation of a possible winter transfer to Liverpool. However, the January transfer window closed without a move, with Málaga management stating they were pleased to retain Ochoa, adding the player had been "a professional".

Despite his lack of club minutes, Ochoa's international profile earned him a seventh-place ranking in the International Federation of Football History & Statistics' list of the world's best goalkeepers for 2014.

==== 2015–16 season ====
Ochoa's status as a backup continued deep into his second season with the club. He finally made his long-awaited La Liga debut on 5 March 2016 during a 3–3 draw with Deportivo La Coruña, stepping in as a 36th-minute substitute after Kameni sustained an injury. This marked Ochoa's first league appearance in over a year. With Kameni sidelined, Ochoa capitalised on the opportunity and stepped into the starting lineup for the remainder of the campaign. He ultimately made 11 league appearances, recording three clean sheets and helping the team secure an eighth-place finish.

==== Granada (loan) ====
On 22 July 2016, Granada announced they had acquired Ochoa on a season-long loan. He made his league debut on 20 August in a 1–1 draw against Villarreal and went on to play every minute of Granada's league campaign.

During the season, Ochoa set a new La Liga record for the most goals conceded in a single campaign, ultimately conceding 82 goals as Granada were relegated to the Segunda División, having only won four matches in the season. Despite the high number of goals conceded, Ochoa's individual performances were highly regarded; he led all goalkeepers across Europe's top five leagues by making 162 saves over the course of the season. In recognition of his efforts, Granada fans voted him the club's Player of the Season.

Following the conclusion of his loan and the expiration of his contract with Málaga, Ochoa became a free agent at the end of the 2016–17 season.

=== Standard Liège ===
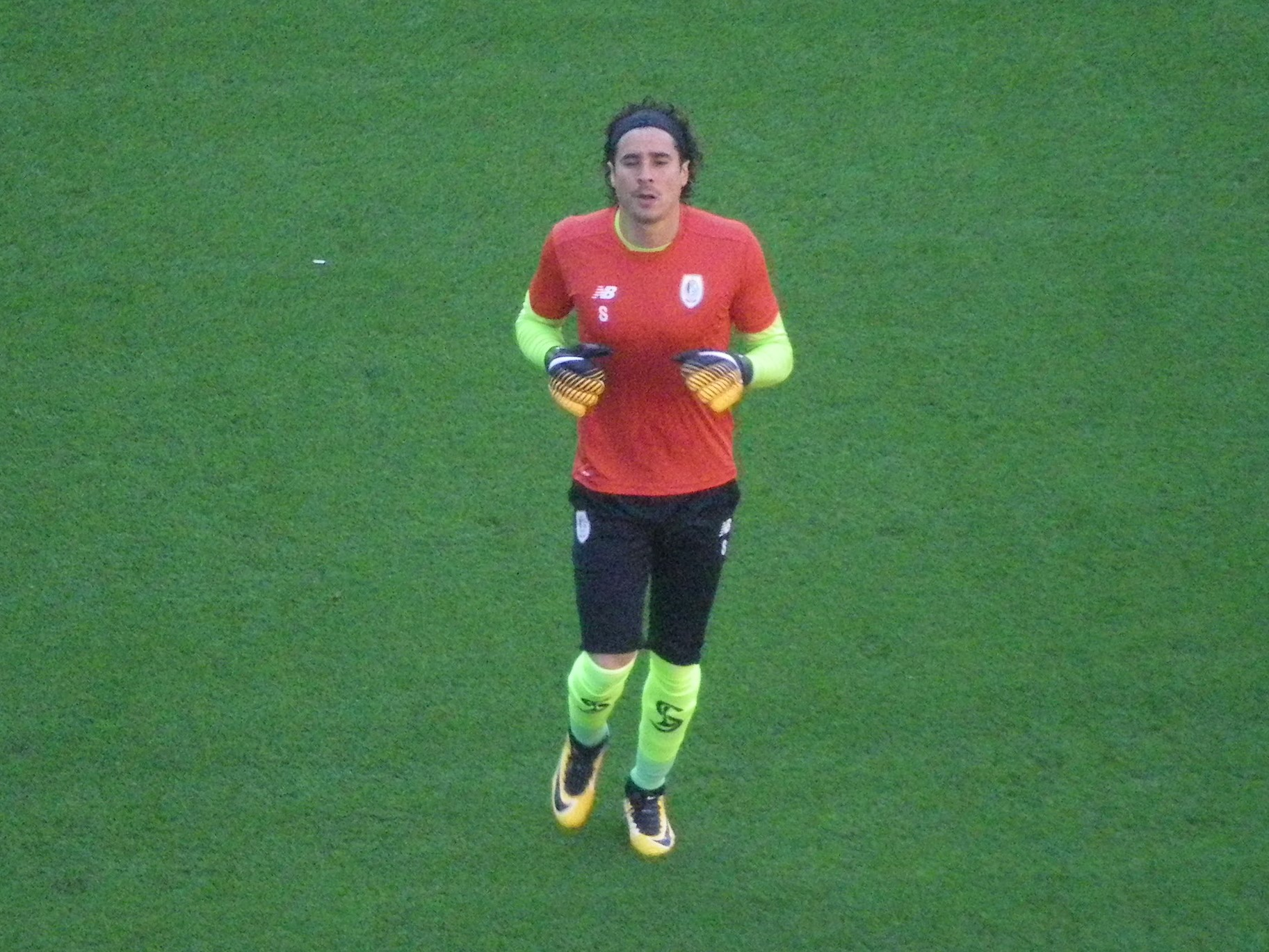
Ochoa with Standard Liège in 2017

On 9 July 2017, it was announced Belgian club Standard Liège had signed Ochoa on a two-year contract. He made his league debut on the 30th of the month in a 1–1 draw against KV Mechelen. Ochoa quickly became the club's first choice goalkeeper and played 38 out of 40 league games during the 2017–18 season as Standard Liège finished as runners-up in the Belgian Pro League playoffs. He was also part of the squad that won the 2017–18 Belgian Cup, defeating Genk 1–0 in the final.

The following season, Ochoa played in every league match with Standard, including eight matches in the Europa League, and he was named the club's Player of the Season. In May 2019, Ochoa suggested that he would leave Standard Liège.

=== Return to América ===
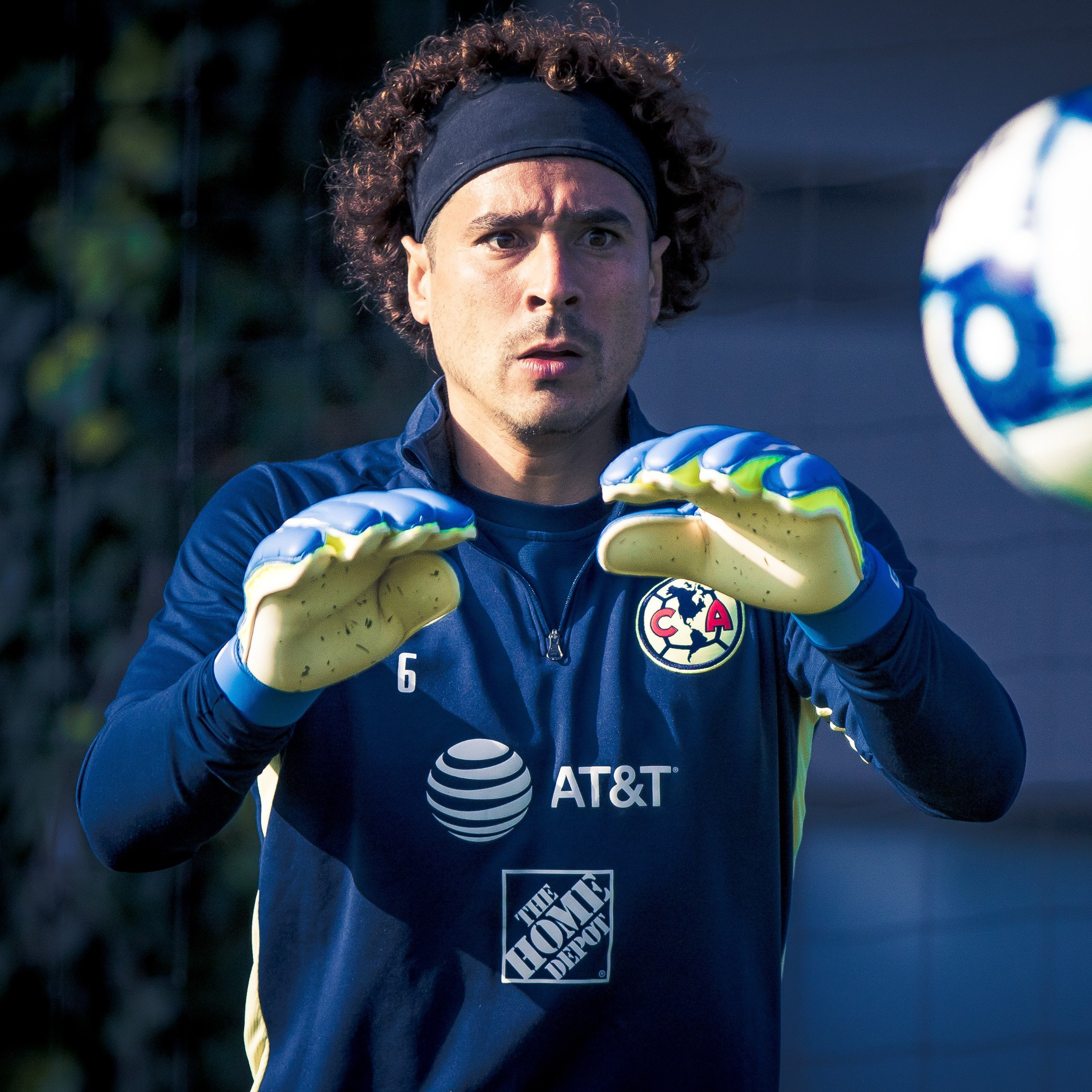
Ochoa training with América

On 5 August 2019, Ochoa returned to Club América on a three-and-a-half-year deal. Though details of the transfer were undisclosed, it was reported that Ochoa would be the highest-paid Mexican player in the Liga MX, earning US$4.4 million annually. He chose the number 6 jersey, as the numbers 1, 8, and 13 – numbers he has previously worn throughout his career – had already been registered. On 24 August, he played his first match for América since 2011 against Tigres UANL, which ended in a 1–1 draw. The team went on to reach the Apertura championship finals and faced Monterrey, with Ochoa playing in both legs and managing to save Stefan Medina's penalty kick in the subsequent shootout, though it was not enough to prevent Monterrey from winning 4–2 on penalty kicks, following a 3–3 draw on aggregate.

Prior to the start of the 2020–21 season, Ochoa switched his jersey number. On 29 August 2020, he wore the captain's armband for the first time since returning to Club América in their 2–1 victory over Atlético San Luis.

Following a 1–0 win against Querétaro on 24 August 2022, Ochoa became the goalkeeper with the most clean sheets in Club América's 105-year history, breaking the previous record of 110 held by Adrián Chávez.

=== Salernitana ===
On 23 December 2022, Ochoa signed for Italian Serie A club Salernitana, agreeing a contract until 30 June 2023 with a one-year extension option. After helping the club avoid relegation, Ochoa won Salernitana's Player of The Season award. He left Salernitana by mutual consent at the end of the 2023–24 season with the club relegated to the Serie B.

=== AVS ===
On 2 September 2024, Portuguese club AVS announced Ochoa's signing as a free agent.

=== AEL Limassol ===
By the end of the 2025 summer transfer window, Ochoa's expected transfer to Spanish Segunda División side Burgos CF fell through due to contractual financial disagreements. Shortly after, he signed with AEL Limassol of Cyprus. On 22 September, Ochoa debuted in a 5–0 loss to Omonia.

== International career ==
=== 2004–2010: Debut and FIFA World Cups ===
Ochoa was included in the roster to participate at the 2004 Summer Olympics in Athens, Greece, but saw no playing time as the third-choice goalkeeper. He was part of the team at 2005 Toulon Tournament in France, where Mexico finished sixth. He was also called up for the 2005 Gold Cup but received no playing time. On 14 December 2005, at age 20, Ochoa made his senior national team debut in a friendly match against Hungary, which Mexico won 2–0. Ochoa was called up by coach Ricardo La Volpe for the 2006 FIFA World Cup as the third-choice goalkeeper.

After the World Cup, newly appointed manager Hugo Sánchez called Ochoa into the national side as a deputy to Mexico's then-starting goalkeeper, Oswaldo Sánchez. Ochoa was a part of the squad which participated at the 2007 CONCACAF Gold Cup, appearing once in a group stage match against Cuba as Mexico finished runner-up to rivals the United States. He also played for Mexico at the Copa América that same summer, being praised for his performance in the 2–0 group stage victory over eventual-champions Brazil. He appeared in an additional group stage match against Chile in a scoreless draw and in the third-place match against Uruguay, winning 3–1.

He was named captain for the under-23 side that would participate at the Olympic qualifiers in order to participate at the 2008 Summer Olympics. Mexico failed to qualify following a group stage exit and Hugo Sánchez was let go as Mexico's head coach.

He made his 2010 World Cup qualification debut on 28 March 2009 against Costa Rica, eventually playing the majority of the qualification matches. Ochoa was included in Mexico's roster for the 2009 CONCACAF Gold Cup, where he started in every match. In the semi-final against Costa Rica, the game was taken into a penalty shoot-out following a 1–1 draw. Ochoa would block Costa Rica's third attempt during the shoot-out, winning the series 5–3 and winning the man of the match award. As Mexico won the final against the United States with a score of 5–0, he was subsequently included in the All-Tournament Team. Ochoa made the final 23-man cut for the 2010 World Cup, but was controversially named back-up goalkeeper to veteran Óscar Pérez by coach Javier Aguirre.

=== 2011: Gold Cup and doping allegations ===
During the 2011 CONCACAF Gold Cup, Ochoa—along with four other members of the Mexico national team—tested positive for the banned substance Clenbuterol and were withdrawn from the team's tournament squad. All players were later acquitted by the Mexican Football Federation and the results were blamed on contamination of meat, with the ingestion of clenbuterol considered non-intentional. The World Anti-Doping Agency (WADA) appealed to the Court of Arbitration for Sport to request a ban. On 12 October 2011, WADA withdrew the request after the full file was available for them.

=== 2014 FIFA World Cup ===
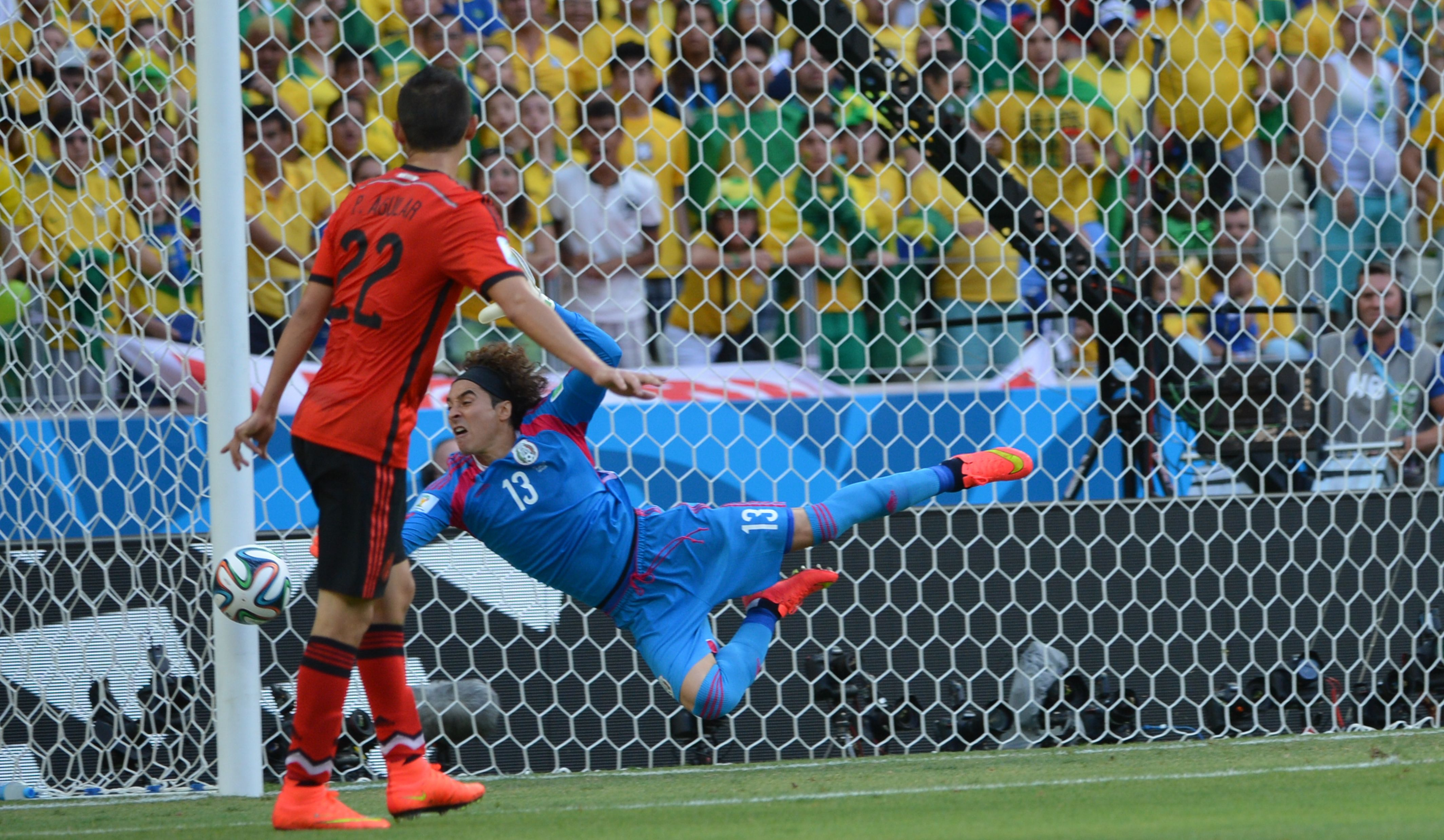
Ochoa in action against Brazil during their group stage match at the 2014 FIFA World Cup

On 9 May 2014, Ochoa was named in Mexico's 23-man squad for that year's World Cup. He started in Mexico's opening match against Cameroon on 13 June, which ended in a 1–0 victory. The match was Ochoa's debut in a World Cup, having been called up for the previous two tournaments but failing to appear in a match.

On 17 June, in the second group stage match against hosts Brazil, Ochoa made four notable saves, including one following a powerful header from Neymar that helped secure a 0–0 draw, immediately drawing comparisons to Gordon Banks' famed 1970 World Cup save against Pelé. Ochoa was named man of the match, earning praise from many, including Brazilian head coach Luiz Felipe Scolari. Ochoa himself commented on his performance, saying, "It was the match of my life. To do it in a World Cup, in front of all the fans, it's incredible."

Ochoa conceded one goal in the group stage, in the 3–1 victory against Croatia that qualified Mexico for the round-of-16. Ochoa started in Mexico's knock-out match against the Netherlands, in which he made several crucial saves to hold on to Mexico's 1–0 advantage. However, the Dutch ultimately won 2–1 through a penalty scored in the 91st minute. Ochoa's performance was praised, and he was named man of the match for a second time.

=== 2017 FIFA Confederations Cup ===
Ochoa was included in the 2017 FIFA Confederations Cup roster. In Mexico's third place match against Portugal, Ochoa managed to contribute various crucial saves, additionally stopping Andre Silva's 17th-minute penalty kick attempt. Mexico lost 1–2 in overtime but he won the man of the match award.

=== 2018 FIFA World Cup ===
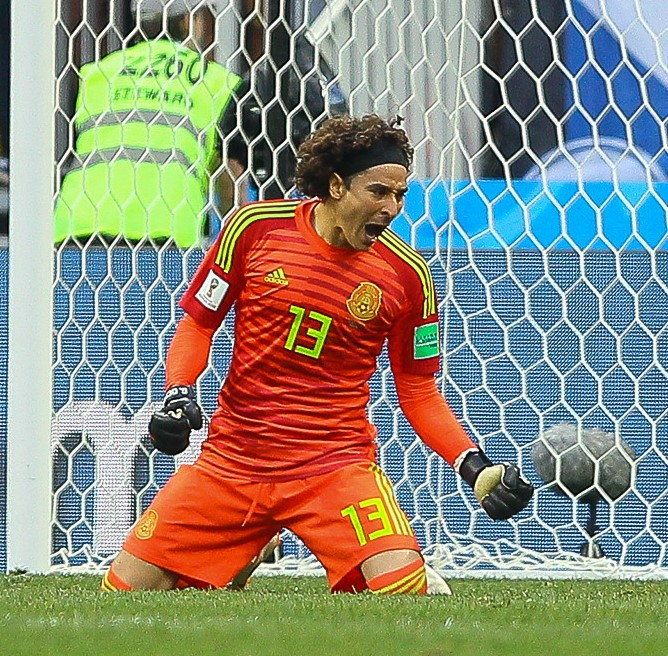
Ochoa celebrating against Germany at the 2018 FIFA World Cup

In May 2018, Ochoa was named in the squad for the 2018 World Cup. In Mexico's opener against Germany, Ochoa made a total of nine saves, notably pushing a goal-bound Toni Kroos free-kick onto the crossbar, and ultimately securing a clean sheet in the 1–0 victory. He went on to play in all four of Mexico's games, making a total of 25 saves, more than any other goalkeeper in the tournament with the exception of Belgium's Thibaut Courtois, who managed 27 saves in seven games.

=== 2019 CONCACAF Gold Cup ===
Ochoa was included in Tata Martino's preliminary roster for the 2019 CONCACAF Gold Cup and was subsequently included in the final list. In the quarterfinal match against Costa Rica, Ochoa proved to be decisive as he contributed to various saves to send the game tied 1–1 game to a penalty shoot-out, where he also made the critical stop in the shootout to send Mexico to the semifinal. His contributions won him the man of the match award. As Mexico defeated the United States in the final, he was included in the tournament's Best XI along with winning the Golden Glove Award. His participation in the tournament was his fifth Gold Cup, thus holding the record for the Mexican with most Gold Cup appearances.

=== 2020 Summer Olympics ===
Ochoa was called up by Jaime Lozano as one of three over-age reinforcements for the 2020 Summer Olympics in Tokyo, his second participation at the Olympic Games after 2004. He won the bronze medal with the Olympic team.

=== 2022 FIFA World Cup ===
In November 2022, Ochoa was named in the squad for the 2022 World Cup. In Mexico's debut match against Poland, Ochoa saved a penalty from Robert Lewandowski resulting in a scoreless draw between the two sides, winning the man of the match award. However, he did not contribute much in the two final matches, as Mexico suffered a painful group stage elimination for the first time since 1978 when his team fell behind Poland on goal difference due to conceding a brutal late goal from Salem Al-Dawsari in Mexico's 2–1 victory over Saudi Arabia, and he was even criticised for losing focus in that devastating goal.

=== 2023 CONCACAF Gold Cup ===
Following the retirement of captain Andrés Guardado from the national team, Ochoa officially assumed the role.

In June 2023, Ochoa was called up for the 2023 CONCACAF Gold Cup. Mexico went on to win a record 12th Gold Cup title at the competition, beating Panama 1–0 in the final. This was Ochoa's fifth Gold Cup title, making him the most successful player in the history of the competition. During the course of the tournament, Ochoa kept a total of four clean sheets, winning the Golden Glove award and being included in the competition's best eleven.

=== 2024–2025: CONCACAF Nations League and Gold Cup ===
In November 2024, Ochoa was called up by Javier Aguirre for the 2024–25 CONCACAF Nations League, and he started in the first leg quarter-final match against Honduras. In March 2025, Mexico would go on to win their first-ever Nations League title by defeating Panama 2–1 in the final.

In June 2025, Ochoa was called up for the 2025 CONCACAF Gold Cup. Mexico would win the tournament by defeating the United States 2–1 in the final, making it Ochoa's sixth Gold Cup win.

=== 2026 FIFA World Cup ===
On 31 May 2026, Ochoa was named in Mexico's 26-man squad for the 2026 World Cup on home soil, marking his record-equaling sixth appearance in a World Cup squad alongside Cristiano Ronaldo and Lionel Messi. On 24 June, he made his first appearance of the tournament and last as a player as a substitute in a 3–0 victory over the Czech Republic, becoming the oldest Mexican player to feature at a World Cup at 40 years and 346 days old, surpassing the previous record held by Rafael Márquez. The match also proved to be his final international appearance for Mexico. Mexico's World Cup campaign ended with a 3–2 round of 16 defeat to the England, after which Ochoa retired from international football.

== Style of play ==
Karla Villegas Gamas of Bleacher Report described Ochoa as "proven to be a safe keeper, with confidence and leadership. His experience is vast, and that is why he knows how to handle pressure. Paco Memo has played in some of the most important tournaments in world football, such as the Confederations Cup, Gold Cup and Copa América. Ochoa's aerial game is enviable. He can catch a cross or a shot, but he can also deflect them with high dives with the top hand and punches. But those are not his only assets. His reflexes are so sharp that he can perform a collapse dive with one hand with ease, even if he has just rejected a shot. When the rivals made it past the defense, Ochoa knows how to work inside the box to cover his goal as much as possible by narrowing the angle."

Ochoa cited Peter Schmeichel as an influence on his playing style.

"It was an excellent save. The goalkeeper from Mexico was very good.”

— Pelé on Ochoa's save against Brazil in the 2014 FIFA World Cup,

"A top goalkeeper, I've been watching him since América played against Arsenal in the final, I told him back then that he was in the top three of best goalkeepers in the world."

— Diego Maradona,

Ochoa has inspired other goalkeepers like Alex Padilla, Antonio Carrera, and Simão Bertelli.

== Personal life ==
In 2005, Ochoa dated Mexican actress, singer and songwriter Dulce María. The pair split a year later. After his move to France, he began dating Mexican model Karla Mora. On 8 February 2013, Mora gave birth to a girl, Lucciana, in Corsica. The couple welcomed their second child, a son, on 1 April 2015 in Málaga, one day after Ochoa's national team teammate Andrés Guardado's son was born. They were married in Ibiza, Spain on 8 July 2017. The couple's second daughter was born in Liège in May 2019.

Ochoa played internationally with shirt number 13, in reference to his birthday which is on 13 July.

Ochoa is a graduate of the Football Management Degree online program from the Johan Cruyff Institute.

In October 2017, Ochoa helped found Asociación Mexicana de Futbolistas (Mexican Footballers Association).

Ochoa is an active investor in startups, including the digital music startup, TREBEL Music.

Ochoa appeared on the North American front cover of the FIFA games, FIFA 08, and FIFA 09.

On 19 July 2022, Ochoa received an offer from former NFL kicker Raúl Allegre to help train him if he wanted to join the same profession.

=== Retirement ===
On 22 July 2026, Ochoa announced his retirement from professional football.

== Career statistics ==
=== Club ===
Appearances and goals by club, season and competition
Club	Season	League			National cup (Note: Includes Coupe de France, Copa del Rey, Cypriot Cup)		Continental		Other		Total	
Club	Season	Division	Apps	Goals	Apps	Goals	Apps	Goals	Apps	Goals	Apps	Goals
América	2003–04	Mexican Primera División	12	0	—		5	0	—		17	0
América	2004–05	Mexican Primera División	31	0	—		4	0	3	0	38	0
América	2005–06	Mexican Primera División	30	0	—		—		2	0	32	0
América	2006–07	Mexican Primera División	42	0	—		17	0	5	0	64	0
América	2007–08	Mexican Primera División	26	0	—		9	0	4	0	39	0
América	2008–09	Mexican Primera División	32	0	—		—		3 (Note: Appearances in InterLiga)	0	35	0
América	2009–10	Mexican Primera División	28	0	—		—		4	0	32	0
América	2010–11	Mexican Primera División	38	0	—		7 (Note: Appearances in Copa Libertadores)	0	—		45	0
América	Total		239	0	—		42	0	21	0	302	0
Ajaccio	2011–12	Ligue 1	37	0	2	0	—		—		39	0
Ajaccio	2012–13	Ligue 1	38	0	0	0	—		1 (Note: Appearance in Coupe de la Ligue)	0	39	0
Ajaccio	2013–14	Ligue 1	37	0	1	0	—		—		38	0
Ajaccio	Total		112	0	3	0	—		1	0	116	0
Málaga	2014–15	La Liga	0	0	6	0	—		—		6	0
Málaga	2015–16	La Liga	11	0	2	0	—		—		13	0
Málaga	Total		11	0	8	0	—		—		19	0
Granada (loan)	2016–17	La Liga	38	0	1	0	—		—		39	0
Standard Liège	2017–18	Belgian Pro League	38	0	0	0	—		—		38	0
Standard Liège	2018–19	Belgian Pro League	40	0	0	0	8 (Note: Two appearances in UEFA Champions League, six appearances in UEFA Europa League)	0	—		48	0
Standard Liège	Total		78	0	0	0	8	0	—		86	0
América	2019–20	Liga MX	29	0	—		2 (Note: Appearances in CONCACAF Champions League)	0	—		31	0
América	2020–21	Liga MX	32	0	—		7	0	—		39	0
América	2021–22	Liga MX	37	0	—		—		—		37	0
América	2022–23	Liga MX	20	0	—		—		—		20	0
América	Total		118	0	—		9	0	—		127	0
Salernitana	2022–23	Serie A	20	0	0	0	—		—		20	0
Salernitana	2023–24	Serie A	21	0	0	0	—		—		21	0
Salernitana	Total		41	0	0	0	—		—		41	0
AVS	2024–25	Primeira Liga	22	0	—		—		—		22	0
AEL Limassol	2025–26	Cypriot First Division	22	0	4	0	—		—		26	0
Career total			681	0	16	0	59	0	22	0	778	0

=== International ===
Appearances and goals by national team and year
National team	Year	Apps	Goals
Mexico	2005	1	0
Mexico	2006	0	0
Mexico	2007	13	0
Mexico	2008	3	0
Mexico	2009	16	0
Mexico	2010	8	0
Mexico	2011	6	0
Mexico	2012	3	0
Mexico	2013	5	0
Mexico	2014	11	0
Mexico	2015	8	0
Mexico	2016	5	0
Mexico	2017	12	0
Mexico	2018	9	0
Mexico	2019	9	0
Mexico	2020	1	0
Mexico	2021	12	0
Mexico	2022	13	0
Mexico	2023	14	0
Mexico	2024	3	0
Mexico	2025	0	0
Mexico	2026	2	0
Total		154	0

== Honours ==
San Luis

- Primera División A: Apertura 2004
- Campeón de Ascenso: 2004–05

América

- Mexican Primera División: Clausura 2005
- Campeón de Campeones: 2005,
- InterLiga: 2004, 2007, 2008
- CONCACAF Champions' Cup: 2006

Standard Liège

- Belgian Cup: 2017–18

Mexico Olympic

- Summer Olympics bronze medal: 2020
- CONCACAF Pre-Olympic Tournament: 2004

Mexico

- Copa América third place: 2007
- CONCACAF Gold Cup: 2009, 2011, 2015, 2019, 2023, 2025
- CONCACAF Nations League: 2024–25

Individual

- Mexican Primera División Best Rookie: 2003–04
- Premios Televisa Deportes Athletic Newcomer of the Year: 2004
- Premios Juventud Rookie That Rocks: 2005
- Mexican Primera División Golden Glove: Apertura 2006, Clausura 2007
- South American Team of the Year: 2007
- Tecate Premios Deportes Best Goalkeeper: 2008, 2009
- Tecate Premios Deportes Best XI: 2008, 2009
- CONCACAF Gold Cup Best XI: 2009, 2019, 2023
- Ajaccio Player of the Season: 2011–12, 2012–13
- Ajaccio Player of the Month: August 2013, September 2013
- Premios Univision Deportes Save of the Year: 2014
- Granada Player of the Season: 2016–17
- Standard Liège Player of the Month: November 2017, October 2018, November 2018, February 2019, April 2019
- Standard Liège Player of the Season: 2018–19
- CONCACAF Gold Cup Golden Glove: 2019, 2023
- Liga MX All-Star: 2021
- CONCACAF Champions League Golden Glove: 2021
- CONCACAF Champions League Team of the Tournament: 2021
- IFFHS CONCACAF Best XI: 2021, 2023
- IFFHS CONCACAF Best Goalkeeper: 2021
- Salernitana Player of the Month: January 2023, October 2023
- Salernitana MVP of the Season: 2022–23
- Ajaccio Historic XI
- Primeira Liga Save of the Season: 2024–25
- Ballon d’Or nominee (30th place): 2007

== See also ==
- List of world association football records
- La Liga records and statistics
- List of Ligue 1 records and statistics
- List of Olympic medalists in football
- List of players who have appeared in the most FIFA World Cups
- List of footballers with 100 or more caps
- List of Royal Standard de Liège players
- List of US Salernitana 1919 players
- Mexico national football team records and statistics
- Mexico at the FIFA World Cup
- Mexico at the CONCACAF Gold Cup
