= Ernesto Vázquez =

Ernesto Vázquez may refer to:

- Ernesto Vázquez (footballer) (born 1989), Mexican footballer
- Ernesto Vázquez (tennis) (born 1953), Spanish tennis player
