= Germán Villa =

Mexican footballer (born 1973)

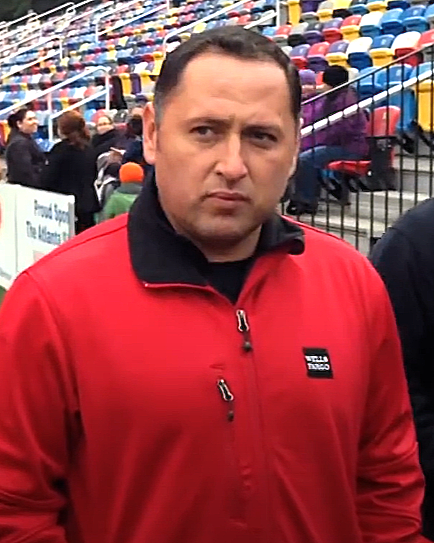

Personal information
- Full name: Germán Villa Castañeda
- Date of birth: 2 April 1973 (age 53)
- Place of birth: Mexico City, Mexico
- Height: 1.77 m (5 ft 10 in)
- Position: Midfielder

Senior career*
Years	Team	Apps	(Gls)
1991–2009	América	434	(14)
1998	→ Espanyol (loan)	12	(0)
1999	→ Necaxa (loan)	17	(1)
2008–2009	→ Necaxa (loan)	7	(0)
2010–2011	Querétaro	12	(0)
2010–2011	→ Irapuato (loan)	0	(0)
Total		482	(15)

International career
1996–2002	Mexico	67	(0)
Medal record
Men's football
Representing Mexico
FIFA Confederations Cup
Winner	1999 Mexico
CONCACAF Gold Cup
Winner	1998 United States
- * Club domestic league appearances and goals

Germán Villa Castañeda (locally [xeɾˈmam ˈbiʝa kastaˈɲeða]; born 2 April 1973) is a Mexican former professional footballer who played as a midfielder.

German made his debut in the 1991–92 season with América against Leon. Villa played regularly with América until 1998 when he decided to go to the Spanish league to play for Espanyol de Barcelona. Villa returned to Mexico for the Verano 1999 season to play with América. He then transferred to Necaxa where he played one tournament. Villa returned to América for the Verano 2000 season. Villa has won two championships, the first in Verano 2002 season and the second in Clausura 2005. He was a vital part of the Mexico national team that played in the 1998 FIFA World Cup and also the 2002 FIFA World Cup tournament.

In November 2009, German Villa created la chancha FC and he signed a contract with Querétaro to play at least one year.

German Villa is regarded as one of América's cantera players of all time, and ranks among the top tier of Mexico's footballers. He is considered one of the best defensive midfielders Mexico has had in the past decade.

== Club career ==
Villa is a graduate of Club América's youth academy, where he rose to international prominence. During the 1991–92 season, he made his debut in the Mexican Primera División in a match against León.

In 1998, following a successful performance at the FIFA World Cup, Germán decided to try his hand in Europe and joined Spanish club Espanyol on loan. In Spain, the midfielder made 12 appearances before returning to Mexico. In 1999, he went out on loan again, this time joining Necaxa. He made 17 appearances for the new club and scored one goal before returning to América.

In 2002, Germán won the Mexican championship for the first time, and he won it again in 2005. During the 2008–09 season, Villa returned to Necaxa on loan. On 25 January 2009, he made his debut for the club in a match against Puebla.

In the summer of 2009, his contract with América expired. He had spent 18 years with the club, making more than 500 appearances, the fourth-highest total in the club's history, and scoring around 20 goals. Villa is also regarded as one of América's greatest players of all time and as the best defensive midfielder in Mexico during the 1990s.

In November 2009, Germán signed a one-year contract with Querétaro. On 24 January, he made his debut for his new team in a match against Pachuca. In 2010, Villa was sent on loan to Irapuato, but due to difficulties adapting to the club, he returned to Querétaro without making a single appearance. He made 12 appearances for the White Roosters. In the summer of 2010, he decided to retire from professional football.

== International career ==
In 1996, Germán made his debut for the Mexico national team. That same year, as a member of Mexico's Olympic team, Villa participated in the Olympic Games in Atlanta. At the tournament, he played in matches against Italy , South Korea, Ghana, and Nigeria. That same year, Germán won his first trophy with the national team, becoming a 1996 CONCACAF Gold Cup champion. During the tournament, he played in matches against Brazil and Guatemala twice.

In 1998, Villa was included in Mexico's squad for the 1998 FIFA World Cup in France. At the tournament, he played in matches against Belgium, the Netherlands, and Germany. That same year, Germán won the CONCACAF Gold Cup for the second time. He participated in matches against Trinidad and Tobago, Jamaica, and the United States. In 1999, Germán won the 1999 FIFA Confederations Cup.

In 2001, Villa participated in the 2001 FIFA Confederations Cup for the second time. He was a substitute throughout the tournament and did not make an appearance.

In 2002, Germán was included in the squad for the 2002 FIFA World Cup for the second time. At the tournament in South Korea and Japan, he remained on the bench and did not take the field.

== Honours ==
América

- Mexican Primera División: Verano 2002, Clausura 2005
- Campeón de Campeones: 2005
- CONCACAF Champions' Cup: 1992, 2006
- CONCACAF Giants Cup: 2001

Irapuato

- Liga de Ascenso: Clausura 2011

Mexico

- FIFA Confederations Cup: 1999
- CONCACAF Gold Cup: 1996, 1998
- Pan American Games Silver Medal: 1995
- CONCACAF Pre-Olympic Tournament: 1996
