= Ricardo Rojas (footballer, born 1974) =

Chilean footballer (born 1974)

Personal information
- Full name: Ricardo Francisco Rojas Trujillo
- Date of birth: 7 May 1974 (age 52)
- Place of birth: Vallenar, Chile
- Height: 1.78 m (5 ft 10 in)
- Position: Centre-back

Team information
- Current team: América U17 (coach)

Youth career
- Academia Santa Inés
- 1990–1991: Deportes La Serena

Senior career*
Years	Team	Apps	(Gls)
1992–1993	Deportes La Serena	33	(0)
1994–1996	Unión Española	75	(10)
1997–2000	Universidad de Chile	53	(0)
2001–2007	América	227	(5)
2004	→ Universidad Católica (loan)	21	(0)
2008	Colo-Colo	18	(1)
2009	Necaxa	6	(0)
2009	→ América (loan)	7	(0)
2010	Deportes La Serena	29	(0)
2011	Veracruz	9	(0)
Total		478	(16)

International career
1994–2006	Chile	46	(1)
1998	Chile B	1	(0)

Managerial career
- 2017–2019: Unión Compañías
- 2020–2022: Provincial Ovalle
- 2024–: América (youth)
- * Club domestic league appearances and goals

Ricardo Francisco Rojas Trujillo (born 7 May 1974) is a Chilean football manager and former player. A centre-back, he played for clubs like Universidad de Chile, América and Colo-Colo.

== Club career ==
As a youth player, he was with Academia Santa Inés, a traditional Football Academy based in La Serena. Rojas began his professional career in his native country, playing for Club de Deportes La Serena from 1990 to 1993. After his stint at La Serena, he signed with Unión Española. The following year Rojas made his debut in the Chile national team, appearing in a game against Argentina. After his time at Unión, Rojas was transferred to Universidad de Chile during the 1997 season.

Ricardo's continued success at both club and national team levels brought attention to him from foreign teams. At the end of the 2000 season he was signed by the Mexican club Club América. Excluding a six-month loan in 2004 to Universidad Católica de Chile, Rojas has been a staple of the Club América defense for seven years. During his stay in Mexico, Rojas won two championships with his club, in the Verano 2002 season and most recently after the Clausura 2005 tournament. Rojas played more than 200 games with Club América during his time there.

In 2009, he played at Necaxa and then he returned to Club América.

== International career ==
Fuentes made 46 appearances for Chile from 1994 to 2006. In addition, he played for Chile B against England B on 10 February 1998. Chile won by 2–1.

== Managerial career ==
Rojas began his managerial career as the coach of Unión Compañías in the Tercera B (Chile) until the end of 2019. At the end of 2020, he became the manager of Provincial Ovalle in the Tercera A (Chile).

In 2023, he moved to Mexico and joined América Fuerzas Básicas, first with the under-13 team.

== Personal life ==
Rojas got a degree in Industrial engineering and also served as councillor of La Serena commune from 2013 to 2016 by replacing Mary Yorka Ortiz.

== Honours ==
Universidad de Chile

- Primera División de Chile: 1999, 2000
- Copa Chile: 1998, 2000

América

- Mexican Primera División: Verano 2002, Clausura 2005
- Campeón de Campeones: 2005
- CONCACAF Champions' Cup: 2006
- CONCACAF Giants Cup: 2001

Colo-Colo

- Primera División de Chile: 2008 Clausura
