= Marco Gómez =

Marco Gómez may refer to:

- Marco Gómez (footballer, born 1984), Mexican football midfielder
- Marco Gómez (footballer, born 2000), Venezuelan football defender
