= Alen Škoro =

Bosnian footballer (born 1981)

Personal information
- Date of birth: 30 March 1981 (age 45)
- Place of birth: Sarajevo, SFR Yugoslavia
- Height: 1.88 m (6 ft 2 in)
- Position: Striker

Senior career*
| Years | Team | Apps | (Gls) |
| 1998–2000 | Sarajevo | 26 | (10) |
| 2000 | Olimpija Ljubljana | 5 | (3) |
| 2000–2001 | Marseille | 6 | (0) |
| 2001–2002 | → Servette (loan) | 1 | (0) |
| 2002–2004 | Sarajevo | 53 | (33) |
| 2004–2007 | Grazer AK | 63 | (17) |
| 2007–2008 | Rijeka | 31 | (7) |
| 2008–2009 | Jagiellonia Białystok | 0 | (0) |
| 2009–2010 | Sarajevo | 32 | (19) |
| 2010 | Querétaro | 10 | (1) |
| 2012 | Austria Klagenfurt | 2 | (1) |
| 2012 | Olimpik | 6 | (1) |
| Total | | 235 | (92) |

International career
| 2004–2009 | Bosnia and Herzegovina | 4 | (0) |

Managerial career
- 2016–2017: Bosna Union (assistant)
- * Club domestic league appearances and goals

Alen Škoro (born 30 March 1981) is a Bosnian football manager and former professional player. At international level, he made four appearances for the Bosnia and Herzegovina national team. He was named manager of second tier Bosna Sema in June 2016.

== Club career ==
Škoro came through the youth set up at Sarajevo. He joined French giants Olympique Marseille aged 20, but had to retire at 32 due to persistent knee injuries after a career which took him to Switzerland, Austria and Mexico. He played two matches for Klagenfurt in the Austrian Regionalliga in 2012 and his last club was Olimpik, whom he joined in summer 2012.

Only whilst playing in the Bosnian Premier League has Škoro ever been a prolific goal scorer and his spells in Ligue 1 and the Austrian Bundesliga were unsuccessful. He scored 63 goals in 111 games for Sarajevo.

== International career ==
He made his debut for Bosnia and Herzegovina in an April 2004 friendly match against Finland and has earned a total of 4 caps, scoring no goals. His final international was a June 2009 friendly against Uzbekistan.

== Career statistics ==
=== Club ===
Appearances and goals by club, season and competition
| Club | Season | League | | | National cup (Note: Includes Bosnia and Herzegovina Cup, Slovenian Cup, Coupe de France, Austrian Cup, Croatian Cup) | | Continental | | Other | | Total | |
| Club | Season | Division | Apps | Goals | Apps | Goals | Apps | Goals | Apps | Goals | Apps | Goals |
|---|---|---|---|---|---|---|---|---|---|---|---|---|
| Sarajevo | 1998–99 | Bosnian First League | 7 | 2 | 3 | 0 | 0 | 0 | 0 | 0 | 10 | 2 |
| Sarajevo | 1999–2000 | Bosnian First League | 19 | 8 | 2 | 0 | — | | 1 (Note: Appearance(s) in Bosnian Supercup) | 0 | 22 | 8 |
| Sarajevo | Total | | 26 | 10 | 5 | 0 | 0 | 0 | 1 | 0 | 32 | 10 |
| Olimpija | 2000–01 | PrvaLiga | 5 | 3 | 1 | 2 | — | | — | | 6 | 5 |
| Marseille | 2000–01 | Ligue 1 | 6 | 0 | 1 | 0 | — | | — | | 7 | 0 |
| Servette (loan) | 2001–02 | Nationalliga A | 1 | 0 | 0 | 0 | — | | — | | 1 | 0 |
| Sarajevo | 2002–03 | Bosnian Premier League | 29 | 13 | 3 | 2 | 2 (Note: Appearance(s) in UEFA Cup) | 0 | — | | 34 | 15 |
| Sarajevo | 2003–04 | Bosnian Premier League | 24 | 20 | 1 | 0 | 0 | 0 | — | | 25 | 20 |
| Sarajevo | Total | | 53 | 33 | 4 | 2 | 2 | 0 | — | | 59 | 35 |
| Grazer AK | 2004–05 | Austrian Bundesliga | 25 | 6 | 2 | 1 | 8 (Note: One appearance in UEFA Champions League; seven appearances in UEFA Cup) | 0 | 1 (Note: Appearance(s) in Austrian Supercup) | 0 | 36 | 7 |
| Grazer AK | 2005–06 | Austrian Bundesliga | 23 | 7 | 1 | 0 | 2 | 0 | — | | 26 | 7 |
| Grazer AK | 2006–07 | Austrian Bundesliga | 15 | 4 | 2 | 1 | — | | — | | 17 | 5 |
| Grazer AK | Total | | 63 | 17 | 5 | 2 | 10 | 0 | 1 | 0 | 79 | 19 |
| Rijeka | 2007–08 | Prva HNL | 27 | 7 | 1 | 0 | — | | — | | 28 | 7 |
| Rijeka | 2008–09 | Prva HNL | 4 | 0 | 0 | 0 | 2 (Note: Appearance(s) in UEFA Intertoto Cup) | 0 | — | | 6 | 0 |
| Rijeka | Total | | 31 | 7 | 1 | 0 | 2 | 0 | — | | 34 | 7 |
| Sarajevo | 2008–09 | Bosnian Premier League | 12 | 6 | — | | — | | — | | 12 | 6 |
| Sarajevo | 2009–10 | Bosnian Premier League | 20 | 13 | 3 | 0 | 1 (Note: Appearance(s) in UEFA Europa League) | 0 | — | | 24 | 13 |
| Sarajevo | Total | | 32 | 19 | 3 | 0 | 1 | 0 | — | | 36 | 19 |
| Querétaro | 2010–11 | Liga MX | 10 | 1 | — | | — | | — | | 10 | 1 |
| Austria Klagenfurt | 2011–12 | Austrian Regionalliga Central | 2 | 1 | — | | — | | — | | 2 | 1 |
| Olimpic | 2012–13 | Bosnian Premier League | 6 | 1 | 2 | 0 | — | | — | | 8 | 1 |
| Career total | | | 235 | 92 | 22 | 6 | 15 | 0 | 2 | 0 | 274 | 98 |

=== International ===
Appearances and goals by national team and year
| National team | Year | Apps | Goals |
|---|---|---|---|
| Bosnia and Herzegovina | 2004 | 1 | 0 |
| Bosnia and Herzegovina | 2006 | 1 | 0 |
| Bosnia and Herzegovina | 2008 | 1 | 0 |
| Bosnia and Herzegovina | 2009 | 1 | 0 |
| Total | | 4 | 0 |

== Honours ==
=== Player ===
Sarajevo

- Bosnian First League: 1998–99

Individual

- Bosnian Premier League top scorer: 2003–04
