= Aarón Padilla (footballer, born 1977) =

Mexican footballer

Personal information
- Full name: Aarón Padilla Mota
- Date of birth: 13 August 1977 (age 49)
- Place of birth: Mexico City, Mexico
- Height: 1.80 m (5 ft 11 in)
- Position: Striker

Senior career*
Years	Team	Apps	(Gls)
1998–2004	Atlante	69	(10)
2004–2006	América	34	(15)
2006–2007	Necaxa	22	(3)
2007–2008	Atlas	5	(0)
2008–2009	Jaguares	15	(1)
2009–2010	Veracruz	15	(1)
2011–2012	Puebla	8	(2)

International career
2005	Mexico	2	(0)

Managerial career
- 2020–2022: Querétaro Reserves and Academy
- * Club domestic league appearances and goals

Aarón Padilla Mota (born 13 August 1977) is a Mexican former professional footballer. He played in the Liga MX for Atlante, América, Necaxa, Atlas, Jaguares and Puebla.

== Life and career ==
Padilla started his career at Atlante in 1998. Despite playing sparsely during his stint at Atlante, he managed to score at least a goal in each season he played in after 2001, attesting to his skill as a goalscoring forward. In 2004, Padilla was transferred to Club América.

In his first season with the Águilas, although only playing for 120 minutes, Padilla scored three goals. In Clausura 2005 season, Aarón was an integral part of the team's title run, scoring seven goals, including three in the playoffs and two in the championship series versus Tecos UAG. His success at the club level led Mexico national team coach Ricardo Lavolpe to select Padilla to play for Mexico in the 2005 CONCACAF Gold Cup.

He won CONCACAF Champions Cup and became top goalscorer of CONCACAF Champions Cup with 4 goals in 2006.

Padilla was transferred to Necaxa during the Summer of 2006. He was signed by Atlas for the start of the 2007 Clausura tournament.

Padilla's father, Aarón Padilla Gutiérrez, played at two World Cups before becoming a football director and administrator at club and national level; he was inducted into the CONCACAF Hall of Fame in 2015.

== Honours ==
América

- Mexican Primera División: Clausura 2005
- Campeón de Campeones: 2005
- CONCACAF Champions' Cup: 2006

Individual

- CONCACAF Champions' Cup top scorer: 2006
