= Elliott Huitrón =

Mexican footballer (born 1983)

Personal information
- Full name: Ivanne Elliott Huitrón Álvarez
- Date of birth: 7 April 1983 (age 43)
- Place of birth: Monterrey, Nuevo León, Mexico
- Height: 1.72 m (5 ft 7 1/2 in)
- Position: Defender

Team information
- Current team: Indios
- Number: 20

Senior career*
Years	Team	Apps	(Gls)
2003–2004	Monterrey		
2005	Cobras de Ciudad Juarez		
2005–2008	Monterrey		
2008–2009	Tijuana		
2009	Monterrey		
2010–2011	→ Ciudad Juárez (loan)		
- * Club domestic league appearances and goals as of 2 May 2009

Ivanne Elliott Huitrón Álvarez (Note: In this Spanish name, the first or paternal surname is Huitrón and the second or maternal family name is Álvarez.) (born 7 March 1983) is a Mexican footballer. He currently plays as a defender for C.F. Ciudad Juárez. He also played for Club Tijuana.
