= David Rojina =

Mexican footballer (born 1988)

Personal information
- Full name: David Alejandro Rojina Reyes
- Date of birth: 16 June 1988 (age 38)
- Place of birth: Nezahualcóyotl, Mexico
- Height: 1.80 m (5 ft 11 in)
- Position: Centre-back

Senior career*
Years	Team	Apps	(Gls)
–2008	CF América U19	40	(1)
2008–2009	CF America II	23	(2)
2009–2010	Bray Wanderers	2	(1)
2010	Tijuana	0	(0)
2010	Veracruz	0	
2010–2011	CDC El Tanque Sisley		
2014	Zacatepec		
- * Club domestic league appearances and goals as of August 2010

David Alejandro Rojina Reyes (Note: In this Spanish name, the first or paternal surname is Rojina and the second or maternal family name is Reyes.) (born 16 June 1988) also known as David Ryes, is a Mexican former footballer who played as a central defender. Reyes began his career with Socio Águila in Mexico. In September 2009, Reyes signed for League of Ireland Premier Division club Bray Wanderers. He has played two games for the club and scored one goal. In January 2010 he got transferred to Club Tijuana.
