= Marco Gómez (footballer, born 1984) =

Mexican footballer

Personal information
- Full name: Marco Antonio Gómez y Garduño
- Date of birth: 27 April 1984 (age 42)
- Place of birth: Mexico City, Mexico
- Height: 1.79 m (5 ft 10 in)
- Position: Winger

Senior career*
| Years | Team | Apps | (Gls) |
| 2005–2007 | Club América | 3 | (0) |
| 2007–2013 | San Luis | 6 | (0) |
| 2009 | → Necaxa (loan) | 12 | (1) |
| 2010–2011 | → Querétaro (loan) | 7 | (0) |
| 2011–2013 | → Mérida (loan) | 50 | (0) |
| 2013 | Zacatepec | 7 | (0) |
| 2014 | Ballenas Galeana | 8 | (0) |
- * Club domestic league appearances and goals as of 5 February 2014

Marco Antonio Gómez y Garduño (born April 27, 1984) is a Mexican former footballer.

== Career ==
A product of the Club América youth divisions, Gómez debuted for the first division team on May 8, 2005, in a game against Atlas which his club won 5–2. Making his professional debut at the fabled Azteca Stadium in Mexico City, Gómez played a total of 13 minutes, coming on in substitution for Argentine standout Claudio López. After his debut, despite remaining in the first team, Gómez has only appeared in two more games, partly due to the fierce competition he faced from fellow forwards like Kléber Boas, Apertura 2005 goalscoring champion; the aforementioned López (two-time world cup attendee), Club América team captain Cuauhtémoc Blanco (two-time World Cup attendee as well), Aarón Padilla, the team's top sub - and newcomers Vicente Matías Vuoso and Salvador Cabañas. On June 11, 2007, Gómez was drafted in Mexico's soccer draft by San Luis. In December 2008 he signed a contract with Club Necaxa.
