= 2006 CONCACAF Champions' Cup =

41st edition of premier club football tournament organized by CONCACAF

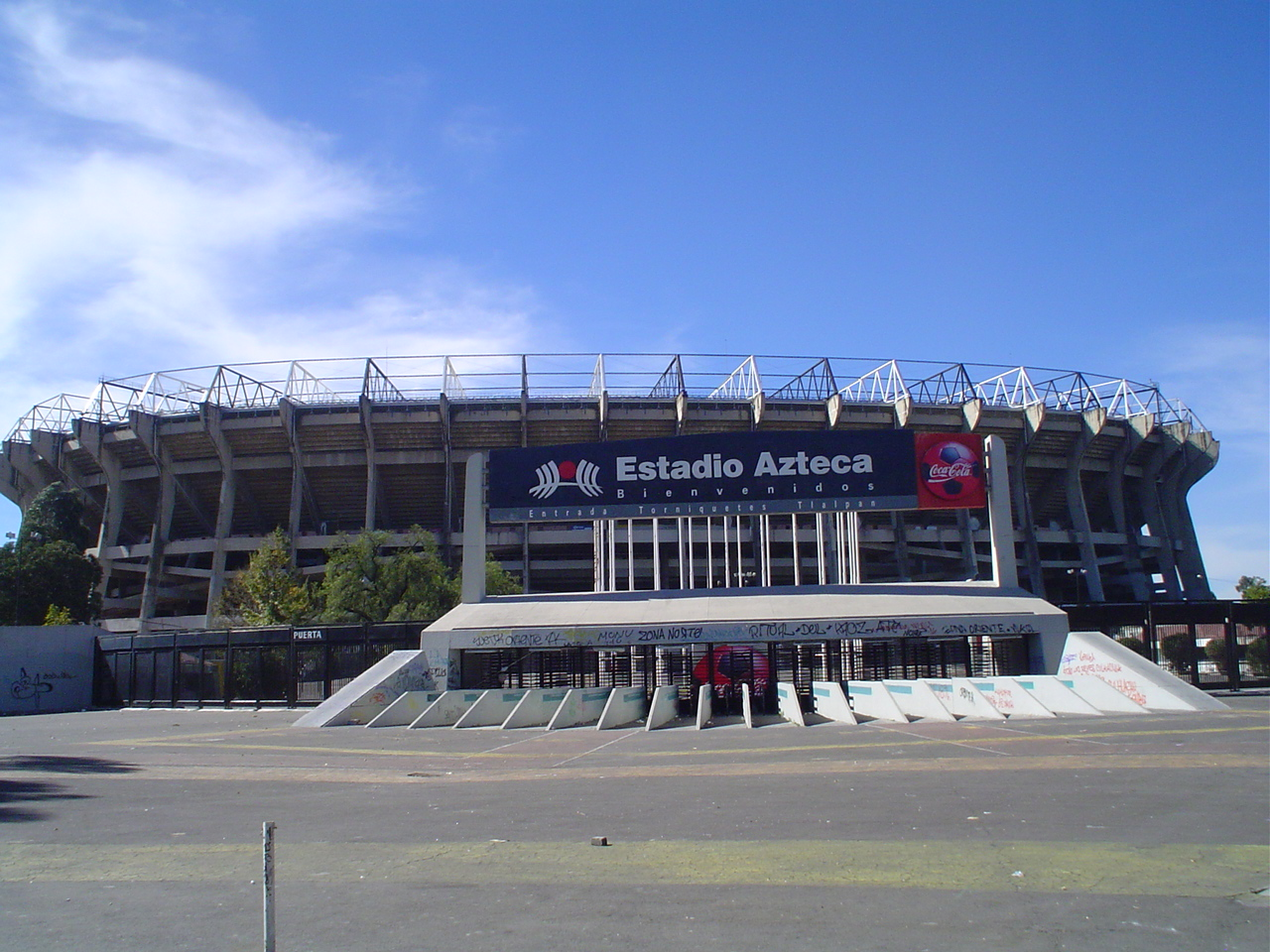
- Estadio Azteca in Mexico City hosted the second leg Final

Tournament details
- Dates: February 22 – April 19
- Teams: 8 (from 5 associations)

Final positions
- Champions: (Mexico) América (5th title)
- Runners-up: (Mexico) Toluca

Tournament statistics
- Matches played: 14
- Goals scored: 34 (2.43 per match)
- Top scorer(s): (Mexico) Aaron Padilla (4 goals)

The 2006 CONCACAF Champions' Cup was the 41st edition of the annual international club football competition held in the CONCACAF region (North America, Central America and the Caribbean), the CONCACAF Champions' Cup. The tournament is also a qualifying event for the 2006 FIFA Club World Cup. Thirty-three teams from eighteen football associations took part, starting with the first qualifying games on July 26, 2005.

The tournament ended with a two-legged final between Mexican teams América and Toluca. The first leg was played at Estadio Nemesio Díez in Toluca, Mexico on April 12, 2006 and ended in a 0–0 draw. The second leg was played at Estadio Azteca in Mexico City on April 19, 2006 and ended with América scoring in extra time for a 2–1 win, therefore the Mexican side achieved their fifth CONCACAF trophy. With the victory, América qualified for the 2006 FIFA Club World Cup held in Japan.

== Qualified teams ==
=== North American zone ===
(Mexico) América - 2005 Clausura champion
(Mexico) Toluca - 2005 Apertura champion
(United States) Los Angeles Galaxy - 2005 MLS Cup champion
(United States) New England Revolution - 2005 Eastern Conference champion

=== Central American zone ===
(Costa Rica) Alajuelense - UNCAF champion
(Honduras) Olimpia - UNCAF runner-up
(Costa Rica) Saprissa - UNCAF third place

=== Caribbean zone ===
(Jamaica) Portmore United - 2005 CFU Club Championship winner

== Bracket ==
Quarterfinals
(Honduras)	Olimpia	0	1	1
(Mexico)	Toluca	2	2	4
(United States)	Los Angeles Galaxy	0	2	2
(Costa Rica)	Saprissa (a.e.t.)	0	3	3
(United States)	New England Revolution	0	0	0
(Costa Rica)	Alajuelense	0	1	1
(Jamaica)	Portmore United	1	2	3
(Mexico)	América	2	5	7

Semifinals
(Mexico)	Toluca	2	2	4
(Costa Rica)	Saprissa	0	3	3
(Costa Rica)	Alajuelense	1	0	1
(Mexico)	América	2	0	2

Final
(Mexico)	Toluca	0	1	1
(Mexico)	América (a.e.t.)	0	2	2

== Quarterfinals ==
February 22, 2006

Olimpia (Honduras)	0–2	(Mexico) Toluca
		Díaz 24'; Cruzalta 90'

Estadio Olímpico Metropolitano
San Pedro Sula, Honduras
Attendance: 14,306
Referee: Brian Hall (United States)
March 8, 2006

Toluca (Mexico)	2–1	(Honduras) Olimpia
Rosada 47'; Esquivel 53'		Cárcamo 22'

Estadio Nemesio Diez
Toluca, Mexico
Referee: Kevin Stott (United States)

Toluca won 4–1 on aggregate.

February 23, 2006

Los Angeles Galaxy (United States)	0–0	(Costa Rica) Saprissa

Home Depot Center
Carson, United States
Attendance: 8,103
Referee: Marco Antonio Rodríguez (Mexico)
March 8, 2006

Saprissa (Costa Rica)	3–2 (a.e.t.)	(United States) Los Angeles Galaxy
Centeno 46'; Solis 57'; Parks 95'		Gardner 21'; Donovan 41'

Estadio Ricardo Saprissa
San Juan de Tibás, Costa Rica
Referee: Armando Archundia (Mexico)

Saprissa won 3–2 on aggregate.

February 22, 2006

New England Revolution (United States)	0–0	(Costa Rica) Alajuelense

Bermuda National Stadium
Hamilton, Bermuda
Attendance: 1,500
Referee: Hu Liu (Canada)
March 8, 2006

Alajuelense (Costa Rica)	1–0	(United States) New England Revolution
Hernández 90'

Estadio Alejandro Morera Soto
Alajuela, Costa Rica
Referee: Peter Prendergast (Jamaica)

Alajuelense won 1–0 on aggregate.

February 22, 2006

Portmore United (Jamaica)	1–2	(Mexico) América
Wolfe 51'		Giménez 60' (pen.); Padilla 71'

Minute Maid Park
Houston, United States
Attendance: 12,988
Referee: Michael Kennedy (United States)
March 8, 2006

América (Mexico)	5–2	(Jamaica) Portmore United
Padilla 4', 56', 90+'; Fernández 57'; Cervantes 80'		Bennett 24'; Morrison 82'

Estadio Azteca
Mexico City, Mexico
Referee: Rodolfo Sibrian (El Salvador)

América won 7–3 on aggregate.

== Semifinals ==
March 22, 2006

Toluca (Mexico)	2–0	(Costa Rica) Saprissa
Esquivel 22', 62'

Estadio Nemesio Diez
Toluca, Mexico
Referee: Terry Vaughn (United States)
March 29, 2006

Saprissa (Costa Rica)	3–2	(Mexico) Toluca
Azofeifa 46'; Saborio 58'; Drummond 90+'		Valadez 60'; Sánchez 87'

Estadio Ricardo Saprissa
San Juan de Tibás, Costa Rica
Referee: Peter Prendergast (Jamaica)

Toluca won 4–3 on aggregate.

March 23, 2006

Alajuelense (Costa Rica)	1–2	(Mexico) América
Scott 67'		Soares 65'; Boas 76'

Estadio Alejandro Morera Soto
Alajuela, Costa Rica
Attendance: 18,000
Referee: Brian Hall (United States)
March 29, 2006

América (Mexico)	0–0	(Costa Rica) Alajuelense

Estadio Azteca
Mexico City, Mexico
Referee: Mauricio Navarro (Canada)

América won 2–1 on aggregate.

== Final ==
=== First leg ===
2006 CONCACAF Champions' Cup Final
April 12, 2006
First leg

Toluca (Mexico)	0–0	(Mexico) América

Estadio Nemesio Diez
Toluca, Mexico
Attendance: 20,000
Referee: José Pineda (Honduras)

=== Second leg ===
April 19, 2006
Second leg

América (Mexico)	2–1 (a.e.t.)	(Mexico) Toluca
Boas 105'; Davino 115'	Report	Da Silva 93'

Estadio Azteca
Mexico City, Mexico
Attendance: 35,920
Referee: Brian Hall (United States)

Team details

América
Toluca

GK	30	(Mexico) Armando Navarrete
DF		(Mexico) Óscar Rojas
DF		(Mexico) Duilio Davino
DF		(Chile) Ricardo Rojas
DF		(Mexico) Ismael Rodríguez	(substituted off) 26'
MF		(Mexico) Germán Villa
MF		(Mexico) Francisco Torres
MF		(Brazil) Irenio Soares	(substituted off) 90'
MF	10	(Mexico) Cuauhtémoc Blanco
FW	7	(Argentina) Claudio López
FW		(Mexico) Aarón Padilla	(substituted off) 45'
Substitutions:
MF		(Argentina) (Mexico) Christian Giménez	(substituted in) 26'
FW		(Brazil) Kléber Boas	(substituted in) 45'
MF		(Mexico) Alejandro Argüello	(substituted in) 90'
Manager:
(Mexico) Manuel Lapuente

GK	1	(Argentina) Hernán Cristante
DF		(Mexico) Manuel de la Torre
DF		(Paraguay) Paulo da Silva
DF		(Mexico) Miguel Almazán
DF		(Argentina) Ariel Rosada
MF		(Mexico) Josué Castillejos
MF		(Mexico) Sergio A. Ponce
MF		(Mexico) José M. Cruzalta
MF		(Argentina) Rodrigo Díaz	(substituted off) 83'
FW		(Mexico) Ismael Valadéz	(substituted off) 59'
FW		(Uruguay) Vicente Sánchez	(substituted off) 89'
Substitutions:
MF		(Mexico) Carlos Esquivel	(substituted in) 59'
FW		(Mexico) Iván Castillejos	(substituted in) 83'
FW		(Mexico) José M. Abundis	(substituted in) 89'
Manager:
(Argentina) Américo Gallego

América won 3–1 on points (2–1 on aggregate).

== Champion ==
CONCACAF Champions' Cup
2006 Winners

América
Fifth Title

== Top scorers ==
Rank	Player	Club	Goals
1	(Mexico) Aaron Padilla	(Mexico) América	4
2	(Mexico) Carlos Esquivel	(Mexico) Toluca	3
3	(Brazil) Kléber Boas	(Mexico) América	2
4	25 players		1
