= 2005 Campeón de Campeones =

Pumas	América
1	2
- on aggregate

First leg
Pumas	América
0	0
- Date: 23 July 2005
- Venue: Estadio Olimpico Universitario, Mexico City
- Referee: Germán Arredondo
- Attendance: 55,000

Second leg
América	Pumas
2	1
- Date: 27 July 2005
- Venue: Estadio Azteca, México City
- Referee: Benito Archundia
- Attendance: 60,000

The 2005 Campeón de Campeones was the 41st edition of the Campeón de Campeones, an annual football super cup match. (Note: The edition number was calculated based on figures provided by Goal.com, with the first Campeón de Campeones having been held in 1941–42.) The match-up featured Pumas, the winners of the Apertura 2004, and América, the winners of the Clausura 2005. It was staged over two legs. The first-leg was played on 23 July 2005 at Estadio Olímpico Universitario, Mexico City and the second-leg on 27 July 2005 at Estadio Azteca, Mexico City.

América won the series 2–1 on aggregate, claiming their fifth Campeón de Campeones title.

== Match details ==
23 July 2005

Pumas	0–0	América

Estadio Olimpico Universitario, México DF
Attendance: 55,000
Referee: Germán Arredondo
27 July 2006
21:00

América	2–1	Pumas
Pereira 63', 68'	Report	Ochoa 52' (o.g.)

Estadio Azteca, México DF
Attendance: 60,000
Referee: Benito Archundia

Campeón de Campeones
2005 Winners
América
Fifth Title
