= Ernesto Vázquez (footballer) =

Mexican footballer (born 1989)

Personal information
- Full name: Ernesto Vázquez Muñóz
- Date of birth: 29 March 1989 (age 37)
- Place of birth: Mexico City, Mexico
- Position: Midfielder

Team information
- Current team: Potros UAEM
- Number: 13

Senior career*
Years	Team	Apps	(Gls)
2008	Club América	0	(0)
2008	Socio Águila	14	(0)
2013–17	Alebrijes de Oaxaca	39	(1)
2017–	Potros UAEM	28	(0)
- * Club domestic league appearances and goals as of 21 September 2018

Ernesto Vázquez Muñóz (born 29 March 1989) is a Mexican footballer who plays for Potros UAEM.

== Club career ==
Vázquez has played for Socio Águila in the Mexican Primera División A since 2008. América gana la final
