= Alvin Mendoza =

Mexican footballer (born 1984)

Personal information
- Full name: Raúl Alvin Mendoza Argüello
- Date of birth: 27 July 1984 (age 42)
- Place of birth: Mexico City, Mexico
- Height: 1.70 m (5 ft 7 in)
- Position: Left-back

Senior career*
Years	Team	Apps	(Gls)
2002–2008	Club América	50	(1)
2004–2005	San Luis F.C.	29	(0)
2008–2009	Veracruz	2	(0)
2010–2011	Querétaro FC	31	(0)
2011	Altamira FC	6	(0)
2013–2014	Coatepeque	20	(0)

International career
2003	Mexico U20	3	(0)
- * Club domestic league appearances and goals

Raúl Alvin "Nalvin" Mendoza Argüello (born 27 July 1984) is a Mexican former footballer who last played for Coatepeque.

Mendoza was trained in the Club America youth system and made his debut during the Clausura 2005 season against Atlante. Despite playing infrequently, Mendoza won his first championship. Mendoza has played 42 games for 1680 minutes.

Mendoza also won the championship in the Primera A with San Luis, Club America's brother team.

He was also part of the Mexico U-20 squad at the 2003 FIFA World Youth Championship held in the United Arab Emirates. He played in all 3 group games, as Mexico exited in the first round.
