= Primera División de México Clausura 2005 =

Primera División de México
- Season: 2004–05
- Champions: América (10th title)
- Relegated: Puebla
- Champions' Cup: América
- Interliga: UANL; Guadalajara; Atlante; Santos Laguna; Chiapas; Toluca; América; Necaxa
- Copa Sudamericana: América
- Top goalscorer: Vicente Matías Vuoso (15 goals)

Primera División de México (Mexican First Division) Clausura 2005 was the 2005 edition of Primera División de México, crowning Mexico's spring champion in football. América won the championship for the tenth time in its history and thus qualified for the CONCACAF Champions' Cup 2006.

== Clubs ==
Location of the Primera División Clausura 2005 teams

Team	City	Stadium
América	Mexico City	Azteca
Atlante	Mexico City	Azteca
Atlas	Guadalajara, Jalisco	Jalisco
Chiapas	Tuxtla Gutiérrez, Chiapas	Víctor Manuel Reyna
Cruz Azul	Mexico City	Azul
Guadalajara	Guadalajara, Jalisco	Jalisco
Morelia	Morelia, Michoacán	Morelos
Monterrey	Monterrey, Nuevo León	Tecnológico
Necaxa	Aguascalientes, Aguascalientes	Victoria
Pachuca	Pachuca, Hidalgo	Hidalgo
Puebla	Puebla, Puebla	Cuauhtémoc
Santos Laguna	Torreón, Coahuila	Corona
Sinaloa	Culiacán, Sinaloa	Carlos González y González
Toluca	Toluca, State of Mexico	Nemesio Díez
UAG	Zapopan, Jalisco	Tres de Marzo
UANL	San Nicolás de los Garza, Nuevo León	Universitario
UNAM	Mexico City	Olímpico Universitario
Veracruz	Veracruz, Veracruz	Luis "Pirata" Fuente

== Pre-season ==
=== Copa Pachuca ===
Source: RSSSF

Semi-finals
7 January – Estadio Hidalgo
Atlas	2
Cruz Azul	0
7 January – Estadio Hidalgo
Pachuca	1
Puebla	0

Final
9 January – Estadio Hidalgo
Atlas	2 (4)
Pachuca	2 (3)
Third place
9 January – Estadio Hidalgo
Cruz Azul	2
Puebla	1

== Regular phase ==
Group 1
Pos	Team	Pld	W	D	L	GF	GA	GD	Pts	Qualification
1	Morelia	17	11	2	4	27	16	+11	35	Automatically qualified for the Liguilla (Playoffs)
2	América	17	7	9	1	38	27	+11	30	Automatically qualified for the Liguilla (Playoffs)
3	UAG	17	8	5	4	31	21	+10	29	Qualified for Liguilla (Playoffs) on a points basis
4	Sinaloa	17	7	5	5	23	19	+4	26	
5	Atlante	17	5	5	7	24	21	+3	20	
6	UNAM	17	4	2	11	11	28	−17	14	

Source: MedioTiempo

Group 2
Pos	Team	Pld	W	D	L	GF	GA	GD	Pts	Qualification
1	Cruz Azul	17	9	4	4	36	19	+17	31	Automatically qualified for the Liguilla (Playoffs)
2	UANL	17	6	6	5	25	19	+6	24	Automatically qualified for the Liguilla (Playoffs)
3	Guadalajara	17	6	5	6	29	31	−2	23	
4	Toluca	17	6	5	6	17	22	−5	23	
5	Puebla	17	4	4	9	19	29	−10	16	
6	Atlas	17	2	5	10	21	35	−14	11	

Source: MedioTiempo

Group 3
Pos	Team	Pld	W	D	L	GF	GA	GD	Pts	Qualification
1	Necaxa	17	9	1	7	28	20	+8	28	Automatically qualified for the Liguilla (Playoffs)
2	Santos Laguna	17	9	1	7	31	31	0	28	Automatically qualified for the Liguilla (Playoffs)
3	Monterrey	17	8	3	6	24	25	−1	27	Qualified for Liguilla (Playoffs) on a points basis
4	Chiapas	17	6	4	7	19	23	−4	22	
5	Pachuca	17	5	5	7	20	27	−7	20	
6	Veracruz	17	3	5	9	15	33	−18	14	

Source: MedioTiempo

=== League table ===
Pos	Team	Pld	W	D	L	GF	GA	GD	Pts	Qualification
1	Morelia	17	11	2	4	27	16	+11	35	Automatically qualified for the Liguilla (Playoffs)
2	Cruz Azul	17	9	4	4	36	19	+17	31	Automatically qualified for the Liguilla (Playoffs)
3	América	17	7	9	1	38	27	+11	30	Automatically qualified for the Liguilla (Playoffs)
4	UAG	17	8	5	4	31	21	+10	29	Qualified for Liguilla (Playoffs) on a points basis
5	Necaxa	17	9	1	7	28	20	+8	28	Automatically qualified for the Liguilla (Playoffs)
6	Santos Laguna	17	9	1	7	31	31	0	28	Automatically qualified for the Liguilla (Playoffs)
7	Monterrey	17	8	3	6	24	25	−1	27	Qualified for Liguilla (Playoffs) on a points basis
8	Sinaloa	17	7	5	5	23	19	+4	26	
9	UANL	17	6	6	5	25	19	+6	24	Automatically qualified for the Liguilla (Playoffs)
10	Guadalajara	17	6	5	6	29	31	−2	23	
11	Toluca	17	6	5	6	17	22	−5	23	
12	Chiapas	17	6	4	7	19	23	−4	22	
13	Atlante	17	5	5	7	24	21	+3	20	
14	Pachuca	17	5	5	7	20	27	−7	20	
15	Puebla	17	4	4	9	19	29	−10	16	
16	UNAM	17	4	2	11	19	28	−9	14	
17	Veracruz	17	3	5	9	15	33	−18	14	
18	Atlas	17	2	5	10	21	35	−14	11	

Source: MedioTiempo

=== Results ===
Home \ Away	AME	ATE	ATS	CHI	CAZ	GDL	MTY	MOR	NEC	PAC	PUE	SAN	SIN	TOL	UAG	UNL	UNM	VER
América	—	1–1	5–2	4–1	–	3–3	–	–	2–0	–	–	4–2	–	0–0	3–3	1–1	–	–
Atlante	–	—	–	2–0	2–0	1–1	–	–	2–3	1–1	–	3–0	1–1	–	–	–	–	5–1
Atlas	–	2–2	—	0–1	–	2–3	–	–	2–0	–	–	1–2	2–3	0–0	1–1	1–1	–	–
Chiapas	–	–	–	—	1–3	–	1–1	0–2	–	0–1	–	2–0	2–2	–	1–1	–	2–0	4–3
Cruz Azul	2–3	–	–	–	—	–	6–1	1–0	–	4–0	3–1	1–2	–	–	–	–	2–2	3–0
Guadalajara	–	–	–	0–2	1–1	—	–	–	2–0	0–4	–	5–1	1–1	–	–	–	2–1	2–0
Monterrey	4–2	1–0	1–0	–	–	0–1	—	–	1–1	–	4–1	–	–	1–3	2–1	1–1	–	–
Morelia	1–1	2–1	4–1	–	–	4–2	1–2	—	–	–	3–1	–	–	1–0	–	2–1	–	–
Necaxa	–	–	–	2–0	0–1	–	–	0–1	—	5–0	–	4–2	4–3	–	1–0	–	3–1	4–0
Pachuca	2–2	–	3–1	–	–	–	2–0	0–1	–	—	1–1	–	–	1–1	–	1–1	1–3	–
Puebla	2–2	2–1	5–2	1–0	–	4–1	–	–	0–1	–	—	–	–	0–0	0–3	0–3	–	–
Santos	–	–	–	–	2–0	–	3–1	3–1	–	2–0	2–0	—	2–1	–	4–2	–	1–1	4–1
Sinaloa	0–1	–	–	–	1–1	–	1–0	0–1	–	3–1	0–0	–	—	–	1–0	–	2–1	2–0
Toluca	–	1–0	–	1–2	0–2	2–1	–	–	1–0	–	–	2–0	1–2	—	–	–	–	1–1
UAG	–	3–0	–	–	3–3	3–2	–	2–0	–	1–0	–	–	–	4–2	—	2–0	1–0	1–1
UANL	–	2–1	–	0–0	0–3	2–2	–	–	2–0	–	–	3–1	1–0	6–0	–	—	–	–
UNAM	2–3	0–1	3–2	–	–	–	1–2	0–2	–	–	1–0	–	–	1–2	–	2–1	—	–
Veracruz	1–1	–	0–0	–	–	–	0–2	1–1	–	1–2	2–1	–	–	–	–	2–0	1–0	—

Updated to match(es) played on 8 May 2005. Source: RSSSF
Legend: Blue = home team win; Yellow = draw; Red = away team win.

== Top goalscorers ==
Players sorted first by goals scored, then by last name. Only regular season goals listed.

Rank	Player	Club	Goals
1	(Argentina) Vicente Matías Vuoso	Santos Laguna	15
2	(Brazil) Kléber Boas	América	12
2	(Mexico) Omar Bravo	Guadalajara	12
4	(Uruguay) Gustavo Biscayzacú	Veracruz	10
4	(Argentina) Walter Gaitán	UANL	10
4	(Chile) Sebastián González	Atlante	10
7	(Argentina) Claudio López	América	9
7	(Argentina) Daniel Ludueña	UAG	9
7	(Brazil) Eliomar Marcón	UAG	9
10	(Mexico) Jared Borgetti	Pachuca	8
10	(Paraguay) Salvador Cabañas	Chiapas	8
10	(Argentina) Carlos Casartelli	Monterrey	8
10	(Argentina) César Delgado	Cruz Azul	8
10	(Mexico) Francisco Fonseca	Cruz Azul	8
10	(Argentina) Alfredo Moreno	Necaxa	8

Source: MedioTiempo

== Final phase (Liguilla) ==
=== Bracket ===
Quarterfinals
2	Cruz Azul (s)	0	3	3
7	Monterrey	0	3	3
3	América (s)	2	1	3
6	Santos Laguna	2	1	3
1	Morelia (s)	2	2	4
9	UANL	3	1	4
4	UAG	2	2	4
5	Necaxa	0	1	1

Semifinals
2	Cruz Azul	1	1	2
3	América	3	3	6
1	Morelia	0	1	1
4	UAG	1	1	2

Finals
3	América	1	6	7
4	UAG	1	3	4

=== Quarterfinals ===
May 11, 2005
21:00

Monterrey	0–0	Cruz Azul
	Report

Estadio Tecnológico, Monterrey
Referee: Marco Antonio Rodríguez (Mexico City)
May 14, 2005
17:00

Cruz Azul	3–3	Monterrey
Zepeda 45' (pen.); Fonseca 52'; Delgado 77'	Report	Martínez 6'; Erviti 13'; Arellano 90'

Estadio Azul, Mexico City
Referee: Jorge Eduardo Gasso (Mexico City)

3–3 on aggregate. Cruz Azul advanced for being the higher seeded team.

May 12, 2005
19:00

Santos Laguna	2–2	América
Rangel 72'; Vuoso 90'	Report	Kléber 15'; López 67'

Estadio Corona, Torreón
Referee: Mauricio Morales (Mexico City)
May 15, 2005
18:00

América	1–1	Santos Laguna
Kléber 34'	Report	Ruiz 76'

Estadio Azteca, Mexico City
Referee: Manuel Ernesto Glower (Mexico City)

3–3 on aggregate. América advanced for being the higher seeded team.

May 11, 2005
19:00

UANL	3–2	Morelia
Gaitán 32' (pen.), 51' (pen.), 63'	Report	Márquez Lugo 12'; M. Trujillo 78' (pen.)

Estadio Universitario, San Nicolás de los Garza
Referee: Adolfo Aquino Benítez (Guerrero)
May 14, 2005
19:00

Morelia	2–1	UANL
Márquez Lugo 31'; Castro 40'	Report	de Nigris 67'

Estadio Morelos, Morelia
Referee: Armando Archundia (Estado de México)

4–4 on aggregate. Morelia advanced for being the higher seeded team.

May 12, 2005
21:00

Necaxa	0–2	UAG
	Report	Ludueña 16'; Marcón 27'

Estadio Victoria, Aguascalientes
Referee: Gilberto Alcalá Pineda (Mexico City)
May 15, 2005
16:00

UAG	2–1	Necaxa
Rodríguez 13'; Ludueña 90'	Report	López 24'

Estadio Tres de Marzo, Zapopan
Referee: José Gabriel Gómez (Morelos)

Tecos won 4–1 on aggregate.

=== Semifinals ===
May 19, 2005
20:30

América	3–1	Cruz Azul
Blanco 2', 56'; López 81'	Report	Fonseca 71'

Estadio Azteca, Mexico City
Referee: Manuel Ernesto Glower (Mexico City)
May 22, 2005
17:00

Cruz Azul	1–3	América
Delgado 9'	Report	Padilla 14'; Torres 38'; López 43'

Estadio Azul, Mexico City
Referee: Armando Archundia (Estado de México)

América won 6–2 on aggregate.

May 18, 2005
20:30

UAG	1–0	Morelia
Leaño 30'	Report

Estadio Tres de Marzo, Zapopan
Referee: Marco Antonio Rodríguez (Mexico City)
May 21, 2005
19:00

Morelia	1–1	UAG
Castro 53'	Report	Morales 18'

Estadio Morelos, Morelia
Referee: Gilberto Alcalá Pineda (Mexico City)

UAG won 2–1 on aggregate.

=== Finals ===
May 26, 2005
20:30

UAG	1–1	América
Colotto 59'	Report	Blanco 87' (pen.)

Estadio Tres de Marzo, Zapopan
Referee: Marco Antonio Rodríguez (Mexico City)
May 29, 2005
18:00

América	6–3	UAG
Padilla 2', 37'; López 4', 89'; Blanco 62'; Mendoza 68'	Report	Lillingston 21'; Morales 59'; Davino 86'

Estadio Azteca, Mexico City
Referee: Gilberto Alcalá Pineda (Mexico City)

América won 7–4 on aggregate.

Champions

10th title

== Relegation ==
Pos.	Team	Pts.	Pld.	Ave.
14.	Atlas	142	110	1.2909
15.	Chiapas	138	110	1.2545
16.	Sinaloa	42	34	1.2352
17.	UAG	130	110	1.1818
18.	Puebla	115	110	1.0454
