= 2012–13 Pumas UNAM season =

UNAM
2012–13 season
- Chairman: Jorge Borja Navarrete
- Manager: Joaquin del Olmo (until August 28, 2012); Antonio Torres Servín (interim) (August 28, 2012–August 31, 2012; from October 28, 2012); Mario Carrillo (September 1, 2012–October 28, 2012)
- Stadium: Estadio Olímpico Universitario
- Apertura 2012: 10th
- Clausura 2013: 7th Final phase quarter-finals
- Copa MX (Apertura): Group stage
- Copa MX (Clausura): Group stage
- Top goalscorer: League: Apertura: Martín Bravo (5); Clausura: Javier Cortés (7); All: Martín Bravo (10)
- Highest home attendance: Apertura: 41,031 vs América (October 28, 2012); Clausura: 44,927 vs América (May 8, 2013)
- Lowest home attendance: Apertura: 16,300 vs Puebla (September 30, 2012); Clausura: 16,212 vs Morelia (February 17, 2013) (April 27, 2013)
Home colours	Away colours

The 2012–13 UNAM season was the 66th professional season of Mexico's top-flight football league. The season is split into two tournaments—the Torneo Apertura and the Torneo Clausura—each with identical formats and each contested by the same eighteen teams. UNAM began their season on July 21, 2012 against Atlas, UNAM played their homes games on Sundays at noon local time. UNAM did not reach the final phase in the Apertura tournament and were eliminated by América in the quarter-finals of the final phase in the Clausura tournament.

== Tornero Apertura ==
=== Squad ===
Note: Flags indicate national team as defined under FIFA eligibility rules; some limited exceptions apply. Players may hold more than one non-FIFA nationality.

No.	Pos.	Nation	Player
1	GK	MEX	Alejandro Palacios
2	DF	MEX	Efraín Velarde
3	DF	MEX	Marco Antonio Palacios
4	DF	PAR	Darío Verón
5	DF	MEX	Luis Fuentes
6	MF	ARG	Martín Romagnoli
7	FW	MEX	Javier Cortés
8	MF	MEX	David Cabrera
9	FW	ARG	Emanuel Villa
10	FW	ARG	Martín Bravo
11	MF	MEX	Jehu Chiapas
12	MF	MEX	José Antonio García
13	GK	MEX	Odín Patiño
14	FW	ESP	Luis García Sanz
15	FW	MEX	Eduardo Herrera
16	MF	MEX	Fernando Espinoza
17	FW	MEX	Pablo Bonells
18	MF	MEX	Carlos Orrantía
19	MF	MEX	Fernando Morales

No.	Pos.	Nation	Player
21	MF	MEX	Jaime Lozano
23	MF	MEX	Fernando Santana
26	DF	MEX	Alfonso Nieto
27	DF	MEX	Neftali Teja
33	DF	MEX	Carlos González
36	GK	MEX	Alfredo Saldívar
37	MF	MEX	Kevin Quiñones
38	FW	MEX	David Izazola
39	MF	MEX	Eduardo Gámez
40	MF	MEX	Michel Castro
46	MF	MEX	Carlos Campos
53	DF	MEX	Salvador Medina
55	FW	MEX	Raúl Servín
56	FW	MEX	Arturo Rodríguez
74	MF	MEX	Kevin Escamilla
88	MF	MEX	Erik Vera
89	MF	MEX	José Antonio García
90	DF	MEX	Aarón Sandoval

=== Regular season ===
Win Draw Loss

==== Apertura 2012 results ====
July 21, 2012 Round 1	Atlas	1–1	UNAM	Guadalajara, Jalisco
21:00	Erepen (yellow card) 23' (yellow-red card) 90'; Ayala (yellow card) 28'; A. Palacios 86' (o.g.)	Report	Bravo 7'; Nieto (yellow card) 42'; García (yellow card) 52'; Romagnoli (yellow card) 65'; Villa (yellow card) 68'; Espinoza (yellow card) 90+3'	Stadium: Estadio Jalisco; Referee: Miguel Ángel Ortega

July 29, 2012 Round 2	UNAM	3–0	Querétaro	Mexico City
12:00	Bravo 5', 15'; García (yellow card) 71'; Espinoza (yellow card) 72'; Herrera (yellow card) 82', (goal) 88'	Report	García Arías (yellow card) 31'; Cortés (yellow card) 82'	Stadium: Estadio Olímpico Universitario; Referee: César Arturo Ramos

August 3, 2012 Round 3	Tijuana	1–0	UNAM	Tijuana, Baja California
17:30	Castillo (yellow card) 5'; Hernández (yellow card) 31'; Aguilar 45+'; Gandolfi (yellow card) 57'; Leandro (yellow card) 63'	Report	Bravo (yellow card) 5'; Velarde (yellow card) 28'	Stadium: Estadio Caliente; Referee: Erim Ramírez

August 12, 2012 Round 4	UNAM	1–2	Toluca	Mexico City
12:00	Luis García 37', (yellow card) 75'; García (yellow card) 57'	Report	Cacho 12'; Rodríguez 59' (pen.); Cabrera (yellow card) 65'; Talavera (yellow card) 72'	Stadium: Estadio Olímpico Universitario; Attendance: 23,017; Referee: Fabricio Morales

August 18, 2012 Round 5	Santos Laguna	1–2	UNAM	Torreón, Coahuila
19:00	Ibañez (yellow card) 23'; Ludueña 61'	Report	Chiapas (yellow card) 2'; Villa 30', 48'; Palacios (yellow card) 49'; Velarde (yellow card) 63'	Stadium: Estadio TSM Corona; Referee: Jorge Isaac Rojas

August 26, 2012 Round 6	UNAM	0–1	Cruz Azul	Mexico City
12:00		Report	Pavone 69'	Stadium: Estadio Olímpico Universitario; Referee: Francisco Chacón

August 31, 2012 Round 7	Morelia	0–1	UNAM	Morelia, Michoacán
21:30	Vilar (yellow card) 69'	Report	Cortés (yellow card) 32'; Villa 70'; Luis García (yellow card) 85'	Stadium: Estadio Morelos; Attendance: 18,547; Referee: Jorge Antonio Pérez

September 16, 2012 Round 8	UNAM	0–1	San Luis	Mexico City
12:00	Velarde (yellow card) 41'; Espinoza (yellow card) 47'; Bravo (yellow card) 60'; Palacios (yellow card) 63'; Verón (yellow card) 85'	Report	Aguirre (yellow card) 52'; Mendoza 55'; Castro (yellow card) 70'	Stadium: Estadio Olímpico Universitario; Referee: José Alfredo Peñaloza

September 23, 2012 Round 9	Guadalajara	0–0	UNAM	Zapopan, Jalisco
17:00	Reynoso (yellow card) 54'; Araujo (yellow card) 70'	Report		Stadium: Estadio Omnilife; Attendance: 33,188; Referee: Mauricio Morales

September 30, 2012 Round 10	UNAM	2–1	Puebla	Mexico City
12:00	Bravo 58'; Herrera 65'	Report	Alustiza 69'; Polo (yellow card) 87'; Dimayuga (yellow card) 90'	Stadium: Estadio Olímpico Universitario; Attendance: 16,300; Referee: Óscar Macías Romo

October 3, 2012 Round 11	León	2–1	UNAM	León, Guanajuato
20:30	Peña 45+2'; Hernández (yellow card) 50'; Delgado (yellow card) 50'; Maz 65'	Report	Chiapas (yellow card) 7'; Velarde (yellow card) 11'; Herrera 44'; Verón (yellow card) 48'; A. Palacios (yellow card) 76'; Bravo (yellow card) 90'	Stadium: Estadio León; Attendance: 25,096; Referee: Fernando Guerrero

October 7, 2012 Round 12	UNAM	3–2	Monterrey	Mexico City
12:00	Herrera 13'; Velarde 16'; Nieto (yellow card) 42'; Chiapas (yellow card) 47'; Basanta 54' (o.g.)	Report	Meza (yellow card) 1'; Basanta (yellow card) 15'; Morales (yellow card) 21', (goal) 62'; Delgado 32'; Mier (yellow card) 58'	Stadium: Estadio Olímpico Universitario; Attendance: 16,328; Referee: Marco Antonio Rodríguez

October 14, 2012 Round 13	UNAM	1–0	Pachuca	Mexico City
12:00	Velarde (yellow card) 3'; Izazola 84'	Report	Vidrio (yellow card) 29'; Pizarro (yellow card) 61'; Hernández (yellow card) 90+2'	Stadium: Estadio Olímpico Universitario; Attendance: 22,705; Referee: Víctor Bisguerra Mendiola

October 20, 2012 Round 14	UANL	5–0	UNAM	San Nicolás de los Garza, Nuevo León
19:00	Palacios 20' (o.g.); Acosta 21', 27', 60', (yellow card) 45+1'; Dueñas (yellow card) 34'; Torres Nilo (yellow card) 36'; Hernández 82'	Report	Verón (yellow card) 9'; Fuentes (yellow card) 37'	Stadium: Estadio Universitario; Attendance: 40,214; Referee: Miguel Ángel Flores

October 28, 2012 Round 15	UNAM	0–1	América	Mexico City
12:00		Report	Montenegro 26'; Mosquera (yellow card) 79'	Stadium: Estadio Olímpico Universitario; Attendance: 41,031; Referee: Roberto García Orozco

November 2, 2012 Round 16	Chiapas	3–0	UNAM	Tuxtla Gutiérrez, Chiapas
19:30	Andrade 14', 19'; Rey 42'	Report	M. Palacios (yellow card) 87'	Stadium: Estadio Victor Manuel Reyna; Attendance: 23,547; Referee: Óscar Macias

November 11, 2012 Round 17	UNAM	3–2	Atlante	Mexico City
12:00	Fuentes 30'; M. Palacios 39', (yellow card) 45+1'; Cortés (yellow card) 45+1'; Bravo 76'	Report	Paredes 5'; M. Palacios 51' (o.g.); Guagua (yellow card) 71'	Stadium: Estadio Olímpico Universitario; Attendance: 17,344; Referee: Erim Ramírez

=== Goalscorers ===
Position	Nation	Name	Goals scored
1.	(Argentina)	Martín Bravo	5
1.	(Mexico)	Eduardo Herrera	4
3.	(Argentina)	Emanuel Villa	3
4.	(Mexico)	Luis Fernando Fuentes	1
4.	(Spain)	Luis García	1
4.	(Mexico)	David Izazola	1
4.	(Mexico)	Marco Antonio Palacios	1
4.	(Mexico)	Efraín Velarde	1
4.		Own Goals	1
TOTAL			18

=== Results ===
==== Results summary ====
Overall								Home						Away					
Pld	W	D	L	GF	GA	GD	Pts	W	D	L	GF	GA	GD	W	D	L	GF	GA	GD
17	7	2	8	18	23	−5	23	5	0	4	13	10	+3	2	2	4	5	13	−8

Last updated: 11 November 2012.
Source: Apertura 2012 results

==== Results by round ====
Round	1	2	3	4	5	6	7	8	9	10	11	12	13	14	15	16	17
Ground	A	H	A	H	A	H	A	H	A	H	A	H	H	A	H	A	H
Result	D	W	L	L	W	L	W	L	D	W	L	W	W	L	L	L	W
Position	7	6	10	13	9	12	9	11	11	9	10	7	5	7	11	13	10

Updated to match(es) played on 11 November 2012. Source: Apertura 2012 results and mediotiempo.com
A = Away; H = Home; W = Win; D = Draw; L = Loss

== Apertura 2012 Copa MX ==
=== Group stage ===
Win Draw Loss

==== Apertura results ====
July 25, 2012 1	Celaya	0–0	UNAM	Celaya, Guanajuato
21:15	Acosta (yellow card) 73'; Solórzano (yellow card) 81'	Report	Herrera (yellow card) 33'	Stadium: Estadio Miguel Alemán; Referee: Mario Alcántara

July 31, 2012 2	UNAM	0–0	Celaya	Mexico City
21:00	Sandoval (yellow card) 34'	Report	Riestra (yellow card) 30'; Ríos (yellow card) 74'; Acosta (yellow card) 86'	Stadium: Estadio Olímpico Universitario; Referee: Jorge Antonio Pérez

August 8, 2012 3	UNAM	1–0	Mérida	Mexico City
21:00	Nieto (yellow card) 45+'; Espinoza (red card) 57'; Herrera 80'	Report	Guadarrama (yellow card) 64' (yellow-red card) 90'	Stadium: Estadio Olímpico Universitario; Attendance: 6,697; Referee: José Alfredo Peñaloza

August 22, 2012 4	Mérida	3–1	UNAM	Mérida, Yucatán
19:00	Jiménez 5'; Gómez 43'; Martíni (red card) 66'; Noya (yellow card) 78', (goal) 87'; Juárez (yellow card) 79'	Report	Teja (yellow card) 28'; Sandoval (yellow card) 44'; García (yellow card) 54'; Herrera 78'	Stadium: Estadio Carlos Iturralde; Referee: Marco Ortiz

August 28, 2012 5	UNAM	2–2	Tijuana	Mexico City
21:00	Nieto 16', (yellow card) 80'; Luis García 45' (pen.); Pérez (yellow card) 82'	Report	Martínez 41'; González 90'	Stadium: Estadio Olímpico Universitario; Attendance: 6,196; Referee: César Arturo Ramos

September 19, 2012 6	Tijuana	2–1	UNAM	Tijuana, Baja California
19:00	Aguilar 18'; Enriquez 69'	Report	Nieto 33'	Stadium: Estadio Caliente; Attendance: 18,432; Referee: Antony Zanjuampa

=== Goalscorers ===
Position	Nation	Name	Goals scored
1.	(Mexico)	Eduardo Herrera	2
2.	(Spain)	Luis García	1
2.	(Mexico)	Alfonso Nieto	1
TOTAL			4

=== Results ===
==== Results by round ====
Round	1	2	3	4	5	6
Ground	A	H	H	A	H	A
Result	D	D	W	L	D	L
Position	4	3	2	4	3	3

Updated to match(es) played on 19 September 2012. Source: Apertura results and mediotiempo.com
A = Away; H = Home; W = Win; D = Draw; L = Loss

== Tornero Clausura ==
=== Squad ===
Note: Flags indicate national team as defined under FIFA eligibility rules; some limited exceptions apply. Players may hold more than one non-FIFA nationality.

No.	Pos.	Nation	Player
1	GK	MEX	Alejandro Palacios
2	DF	MEX	Efraín Velarde
3	DF	MEX	Marco Antonio Palacios
4	DF	PAR	Darío Verón
5	DF	MEX	Luis Fuentes
6	MF	ARG	Martín Romagnoli
7	MF	MEX	Javier Cortés
8	MF	MEX	David Cabrera
9	FW	PAR	Robin Ramírez
10	FW	ARG	Martín Bravo
11	MF	MEX	Jehu Chiapas
12	DF	MEX	José Antonio García
13	GK	MEX	Alfredo Saldívar
14	FW	ESP	Luis García Sanz
15	FW	MEX	Eduardo Herrera
16	MF	MEX	Fernando Espinoza

No.	Pos.	Nation	Player
17	FW	MEX	Pablo Bonells
18	MF	MEX	Carlos Orrantía
25	MF	URU	Juan Pablo Rodríguez
20	DF	MEX	Ignacio González
21	MF	MEX	Jaime Lozano
22	DF	MEX	Aarón Sandoval
26	FW	MEX	Alfonso Nieto
76	DF	MEX	Luis Quintana
78	MF	MEX	Kevin Escamilla
82	MF	MEX	Manuel Pérez
85	FW	MEX	Daniel Ramírez
86	FW	MEX	Alan Sánchez
87	GK	USA	Bernabé Magaña
88	MF	MEX	Kevin Quíñones
89	DF	MEX	Alan Mendoza
90	DF	MEX	Josecarlos Van Rankin

=== Regular season ===
Win Draw Loss

==== Clausura 2013 results ====
January 6, 2013 Round 1	UNAM	1–1	Atlas	Coyoacán, Mexico City
12:00	Bravo 36'; Verón (yellow card) 67'	Report	Razo (yellow card) 8'; Erpen (yellow card) 39'; Bravo 79'	Stadium: Estadio Olímpico Universitario; Attendance: 22,212; Referee: Luis Enrique Santander

January 12, 2013 Round 2	Querétaro	2–1	UNAM	Querétaro, Querétaro
17:00	Escoto 64', 65'	Report	M. Palacios (yellow card) 18' (yellow-red card) 35'; Velarde (yellow card) 35'; A. Palacios (yellow card) 45+1'; Cortés 52'; Cabrera (yellow card) 90'	Stadium: Estadio Corregidora; Attendance: 31,431; Referee: Fernando Guerrero

January 20, 2013 Round 3	UNAM	1–2	Tijuana	Coyoacán, Mexico City
12:00	Herrera (yellow card) 22'; Cabrera (yellow card) 35'; Cortés 88'	Report	Arce (yellow card) 16', (goal) 67'; Ruiz 28', (yellow card) 80'	Stadium: Estadio Olímpico Universitario; Attendance: 22,651; Referee: Miguel Ángel Chacón

January 27, 2013 Round 4	Toluca	0–1	UNAM	Toluca, Estado de México
12:00	Novaretti (yellow card) 69'; Dueñas (red card) 86'	Report	Cortés 45'; Chiapas (yellow card) 75'; M. Palacios (yellow card) 89'	Stadium: Estadio Nemesio Díez; Attendance: 12,282; Referee: Marco Antonio Rodríguez

February 3, 2013 Round 5	UNAM	0–0	Santos Laguna	Coyoacán, Mexico City
12:00	Fuentes (yellow card) 27'; García (yellow card) 30'; Verón (yellow card) 53'; Chiapas (yellow card) 81'	Report	Gómez (yellow card) 31'	Stadium: Estadio Olímpico Universitario; Attendance: 19,583; Referee: José Alfredo Peñaloza

February 9, 2013 Round 6	Cruz Azul	1–1	UNAM	Benito Juárez, Mexico City
17:00	Pavone 22' (pen.), (yellow card) 45'; Torrado (red card) 89'	Report	Herrera 45', (yellow card) 48'	Stadium: Estadio Azul; Attendance: 31,315; Referee: Paul Delgadillo

February 17, 2013 Round 7	UNAM	1–0	Morelia	Coyoacán, Mexico City
12:00	Velarde 65'; M. Palacios (yellow card) 90+2'	Report	Rojas (yellow card) 49'; Cárdenas (yellow card) 87'	Stadium: Estadio Olímpico Universitario; Attendance: 16,212; Referee: César Arturo Ramos

February 24, 2012 Round 8	San Luis	0–2	UNAM	San Luis Potosí, San Luis Potosí
21:00	Cuevas (yellow card) 37'; Arredondo (yellow card) 39'	Report	Velarde (yellow card) 3'; Ramírez 47'; Cortés 50'	Stadium: Estadio Alfonso Lastras; Attendance: 9,644; Referee: Francisco Chacón

March 3, 2013 Round 9	UNAM	1–1	Guadalajara	Coyoacán, Mexico City
12:00	Bravo 26'	Report	Sabah 40', (yellow card) 49'; Sánchez (yellow card) 49'	Stadium: Estadio Olímpico Universitario; Attendance: 40,651; Referee: Roberto García Orozco

March 10, 2013 Round 10	Puebla	0–1	UNAM	Puebla, Puebla
16:00	Cabrera (yellow card) 21'; Chávez (yellow card) 37'; Castillo (yellow card) 82'	Report	Bravo (yellow card) 59', (goal) 89'	Stadium: Estadio Cuauhtémoc; Attendance: 27,239; Referee: Marco Antonio Rodríguez

March 17, 2013 Round 11	UNAM	0–0	León	Coyoacán, Mexico City
12:00	Van Rankin (yellow card) 5'; Velarde (yellow card) 41'	Report	González (yellow card) 31'; Montes (yellow card) 43'; Magallón (yellow card) 59'	Stadium: Estadio Olímpico Universitario; Attendance: 24,093; Referee: Jorge Isaac Rojas

March 30, 2013 Round 12	Monterrey	3–0	UNAM	Monterrey, Nuevo León
19:00	Ayoví (yellow card) 11'; Arellano (yellow card) 34' de Nigris (yellow card) 68'; Madrigal 79'; Suazo (yellow card) 85', (goal) 86'; A. Palacios (yellow card) 88'; Delgado 90+2'	Report	Bravo (yellow card) 21'; Cortés (yellow card) 32'; Verón (yellow card) 68'	Stadium: Estadio Tecnológico; Attendance: 33,410; Referee: Miguel Ángel Ortega

April 6, 2013 Round 13	Pachuca	1–2	UNAM	Pachuca, Hidalgo
19:00	da Silva 56'; Marrugo (yellow card) 58'; M. Herrera (yellow card) 88'	Report	Verón (yellow card) 25'; Velarde 53'; Bravo (yellow card) 79'; Cortés 83'	Stadium: Estadio Hidalgo; Referee: Antony Zanjuampa

April 14, 2013 Round 14	UNAM	2–1	UANL	Coyoacán, Mexico City
12:00	Ayala 11' (o.g.); Bravo 31'	Report	Villa 7'	Stadium: Estadio Olímpico Universitario; Referee: Fernando Guerrero

April 20, 2013 Round 15	América	1–0	UNAM	Coyoacán, Mexico City
17:00	Beniítez 22'; Sambueza (yellow card) 33'; Molina (yellow card) 46' (yellow-red card) 67'	Report	Bravo (red card) 33'; M. Palacios (yellow card) 50'; Romagnoli (yellow card) 53'; Verón (yellow card) 66'	Stadium: Estadio Azteca; Referee: César Arturo Ramos

April 28, 2013 Round 16	UNAM	3–0	Chiapas	Coyoacán, Mexico City
12:00	Cortés 8', 88'; Ramírez 44'; Fuentes (yellow card) 74'	Report	Bedolla (yellow card) 87'	Stadium: Estadio Olímpico Universitario; Attendance: 19,034; Referee: Roberto García Orozco

May 5, 2013 Round 17	Atlante	1–2	UNAM	Cancún, Quintana Roo
18:00	Calvo (yellow card) 58'; Martínez (yellow card) 59'; Venegas 70', (yellow card) 71'	Report	Cabrera 21'; Quintana (yellow card) 35' (yellow-red card) 52'; Luis García 55'; Van Rankin (yellow card) 68'; Verón (yellow card) 83'	Stadium: Estadio Andrés Quintana Roo; Attendance: 16,468; Referee: Jorge Antonio Pérez

=== Final phase ===
May 8, 2013 Quarter-finals	UNAM	0–1	América	Coyoacán, Mexico City
21:00	Van Rankin (yellow card) 38'; Velarde (yellow card) 64'; M. Palacios (yellow card) 77'	Report	Jiménez 28'; Layún (yellow card) 79'	Stadium: Estadio Olímpico Universitario; Attendance: 44,927; Referee: Fernando Guerrero

May 11, 2013 Quarter-finals	América	2–1	UNAM	Coyoacán, Mexico City
17:00	Sambueza (yellow card) 53'; Benítez 56', 90+4'	Report	Ramírez 21'; M. Palacios (yellow card) 48'	Stadium: Estadio Azteca; Referee: Marco Antonio Rodríguez

América advanced 3–1 on aggregate

=== Goalscorers ===
==== Regular season ====
Position	Nation	Name	Goals scored
1.	(Mexico)	Javier Cortés	7
2.	(Argentina)	Martín Bravo	4
3.	(Paraguay)	Robin Ramírez	2
3.	(Mexico)	Efraín Velarde	2
5.	(Mexico)	David Cabrera	1
5.	(Spain)	Luis García	1
5.	(Mexico)	Eduardo Herrera	1
5.		Own Goals	1
TOTAL			19

==== Final phase ====
Position	Nation	Name	Goals scored
1.	(Paraguay)	Robin Ramírez	1
TOTAL			1

=== Results ===
==== Results summary ====
Overall								Home						Away					
Pld	W	D	L	GF	GA	GD	Pts	W	D	L	GF	GA	GD	W	D	L	GF	GA	GD
17	8	5	4	19	14	+5	29	3	3	1	9	5	+4	5	2	3	10	9	+1

Last updated: 6 May 2013.
Source: Clausura 2013 results

==== Results by round ====
Round	1	2	3	4	5	6	7	8	9	10	11	12	13	14	15	16	17
Ground	H	A	H	A	H	A	H	A	H	A	H	A	A	H	A	H	A
Result	D	L	L	W	D	D	W	W	D	W	D	L	W	W	L	W	W
Position	12	14	16	11	11	12	9	7	8	5	6	10	5	5	7	7	7

Updated to match(es) played on 6 May 2013. Source: Clausura 2013 results and mediotiempo.com
A = Away; H = Home; W = Win; D = Draw; L = Loss

== Clausura 2013 Copa MX ==
=== Group stage ===
Win Draw Loss

==== Apertura results ====
January 16, 2013 1	Mérida	1–0	UNAM	Mérida, Yucatán
21:00	Reyes 10'; Torres (yellow card) 24'; Charles (yellow card) 35'	Report	Sandoval (yellow card) 62'; Quintana (yellow card) 66'; Espinoza (yellow card) 70'	Stadium: Estadio Carlos Iturralde; Referee: Marco Antonio Ortiz

January 23, 2013 2	UNAM	5–0	Mérida	Coyoacán, Mexico City
21:00	Luis García 12'; Orrantía 21', (yellow card) 32'; Ramírez (yellow card) 30', (goal) 56'; Velarde 35', (yellow card) 38'; Herrera 82'	Report	Torres (yellow card) 89'	Stadium: Estadio Olímpico Universitario; Attendance: 5,968; Referee: Miguel Ángel Ortega

February 12, 2013 3	UNAM	1–1	Celaya	Coyoacán, Mexico City
21:00	Chiapas (yellow card) 38'; Nieto 67'	Report	Solárzano (yellow card) 57'; Ocampo 84'	Stadium: Estadio Olímpico Universitario; Attendance: 4,715; Referee: Antony Zanjuampa

February 20, 2013 4	Celaya	2–2	UNAM	Celaya, Guanajuato
21:00	Riestra 40'; Islas (yellow card) 47'; Pardini 71'	Report	Nieto 12'; Chiapas (yellow card) 16' (yellow-red card) 81'; Lozano 34'; Rodríguez (yellow card) 45'	Stadium: Estadio Miguel Alemán; Attendance: 5,284; Referee: Miguel Alemán Valdés

February 27, 2013 5	UNAM	1–1	Puebla	Coyoacán, Mexico City
21:00	Bravo 32'; Espinoza (yellow card) 62'; Nieto (yellow card) 69'; Rodríguez (yellow card) 88'	Report	Romo (yellow card) 49', (goal) 52'; Durán (yellow card) 85'	Stadium: Estadio Olímpico Universitario; Attendance: 6,315; Referee: Víctor Bisguerra

March 6, 2013 6	Puebla	0–3	UNAM	Puebla, Puebla
21:00	Dimayuga (yellow card) 34'; Martínez (yellow card) 60'	Report	Luis García 56', 64'; Mendoza 66'	Stadium: Estadio Cuauhtémoc; Attendance: 11,241; Referee: Oscar Macías

=== Goalscorers ===
Position	Nation	Name	Goals scored
1.	(Spain)	Luis García	3
2.	(Mexico)	Alfonso Nieto	2
3.	(Brazil)	Martín Bravo	1
3.	(Mexico)	Eduardo Herrera	1
3.	(Mexico)	Jaime Lozano	1
3.	(Mexico)	Alan Mendoza	1
3.	(Mexico)	Carlos Emilio Orrantía	1
3.	(Paraguay)	Robin Ramírez	1
3.	(Mexico)	Efraín Velarde	1
TOTAL			12

=== Results ===
==== Results by round ====
Round	1	2	3	4	5	6
Ground	A	H	H	A	H	A
Result	L	W	D	D	L	W
Position	3	2	2	2	2	2

Updated to match(es) played on 6 March 2013. Source: Clausura results and mediotiempo.com
A = Away; H = Home; W = Win; D = Draw; L = Loss
