= 2010–11 Pumas UNAM season =

64th professional season of Mexico's football league

The 2010–11 Pumas UNAM season was the 64th professional season of Mexico's top-flight football league. The season is split into two tournaments—the Torneo Apertura and the Torneo Clausura—each with identical formats and each contested by the same eighteen teams. Pumas UNAM began their season on 25 July 2010 against Toluca, Pumas UNAM played their homes games on Sundays at noon local time.

== Torneo Apertura ==
=== Squad ===
Note: Flags indicate national team as defined under FIFA eligibility rules; some limited exceptions apply. Players may hold more than one non-FIFA nationality.

No.	Pos.	Nation	Player
2	DF	MEX	Efrain Velarde
3	DF	MEX	Marco Antonio Palacios
4	DF	PAR	Darío Verón (Vice-Captain)
5	MF	MEX	Israel Castro (Vice-Captain)
6	DF	MEX	Luis Fernando Fuentes
7	MF	MEX	Leandro Augusto
8	MF	MEX	Óscar Ricardo Rojas
9	FW	PAR	Dante López
10	FW	ARG	Martín Bravo
11	FW	MEX	Fernando Morales
12	GK	MEX	Sergio Bernal (Captain)
13	DF	MEX	Jehu Chiapas
14	MF	MEX	David Cabrera

No.	Pos.	Nation	Player
15	DF	MEX	Carlos Humberto González
16	MF	MEX	Fernando Espinoza
17	FW	MEX	Francisco Palencia
20	FW	MEX	Juan Carlos Cacho
25	GK	MEX	Alejandro Palacios
29	FW	MEX	Javier Cortés
30	MF	MEX	Luis Ricardo Rosas
35	MF	MEX	Fernando Massiel Santana
60	MF	MEX	Eduardo Gámez
62	MF	MEX	Carlos Emilio Orrantía
64	FW	MEX	Diego De Buen
80	MF	MEX	Carlos Campos
87	DF	MEX	José Antonio García

=== Regular season ===
25 July 2010 Round 1	Pumas UNAM	2–1	Toluca	Estadio Olímpico Universitario, Mexico City
12:00pm	Novaretti 30' (o.g.); Fuentes 73'	Report	Calderón 27'	Referee: Miguel Ángel Ayala

31 July 2010 Round 2	Santos Laguna	4–0	Pumas UNAM	Estadio Corona, Torreón
5:00pm	M. Palacios 26' (o.g.); Rodríguez 53' (pen.); Benítez 56'; Peralta 84'	Report		Referee: José Alfredo Peñaloza

8 August 2010 Round 3	Pumas UNAM	2–0	Cruz Azul	Estadio Olímpico Universitario, Mexico City
12:00pm	Palacios 35'; Cortés 85'	Report		Referee: Ricardo Arellano

14 August 2010 Round 4	Monterrey	5–2	Pumas UNAM	Estadio Tecnológico, Monterrey
7:00pm	Suazo 8', 50' (pen.); Santana 45'; Martínez 76' de Nigris 90'	Report	Leandro 17'; López 23'	Referee: Fernando Guerrero

22 August 2010 Round 5	Pumas UNAM	4–1	Puebla	Estadio Olímpico Universitario, Mexico City
12:00pm	López 26', 89'; Cacho 70', 78'	Report	Rincón 64'	Referee: Miguel Ángel Ortega

28 August 2010 Round 6	Guadalajara	0–0	Pumas UNAM	Estadio Movistar, Zapopan
7:00pm		Report		Referee: Jorge Gasso

12 September 2010 Round 7	Pumas UNAM	0–1	San Luis	Estadio Olímpico Universitario, Mexico City
12:00pm		Report	Moreno 27' (pen.)	Referee: Jaime Herrera

17 September 2010 Round 8	Estudiantes Tecos	2–2	Pumas UNAM	Estadio Tres de Marzo, Zapopan
8:00pm	Zamogilny 20'; Cejas 85'	Report	Chiapas 38'; Bravo 47'	Referee: Paul Delgadillo

26 September 2010 Round 9	Pumas UNAM	2–2	Atlante	Estadio Olímpico Universitario, Mexico City
12:00pm	Bravo 23', 53'		Fano 72', 73'

2 October 2010 Round 10	Pumas UNAM	1–0	Morelia	Estadio Olímpico Universitario, Mexico City
12:00pm	López 63'			Referee: José Alfredo Peñaloza

9 October 2010 Round 11	Pachuca	3–2	Pumas UNAM	Pachuca
7:00pm	Leobardo Lopez 32'; Dario Cvitanchi 46'; Victor Omar Manon 55'		Dante Lopez 11'; Juan Cacho 90'	Stadium: Estadio Hidalgo, Pachuca; Referee: Flores Gasso

17 October 2010 Round 12	Pumas UNAM	1–0	Chiapas	Estadio Olímpico Universitario, Mexico City
12:00pm	Bravo 32'			Referee: Marco Antonio Rodríguez

23 October 2010 Round 13	UANL	2–0	Pumas UNAM	Estadio Universitario, San Nicolás
7:00pm	Juninho 22'; Álvarez 77'			Referee: Roberto García

26 October 2010 Round 14	Pumas UNAM	1–1	Atlas	Estadio Olímpico Universitario, Mexico City
9:00pm	Cacho 55'		Pacheco 84'	Referee: Ricardo Arellano

30 October 2010 Round 15	Querétaro	2–1	Pumas UNAM	Estadio La Corregidora, Querétaro
5:00pm	Blanco 24'; Škoro 90+4'	Report	Cortés 90'	Referee: Armando Archundia

7 November 2010 Round 16	Pumas UNAM	2–0	Necaxa	Estadio Olímpico Universitario, Mexico City
12:00pm	Castro 76'; López 90+1'	Report		Referee: Francisco Chacón

14 November 2010 Round 17	América	0–1	Pumas UNAM	Estadio Azteca, Mexico City
4:30pm		Report	Verón 11'	Referee: Miguel Ángel Ayala

==== Final Phase ====
17 November 2010 Quarterfinals	Pumas UNAM	1–2	Cruz Azul	Estadio Olímpico Universitario, Mexico City
9:00pm	López 19'	Report	Cervantes 33'; Giménez 73'	Referee: Mauricio Morales

20 November 2010 Quarterfinals	Cruz Azul	0–2	Pumas UNAM	Estadio Azul, Mexico City
5:00pm		Report	Bravo 1'; Cacho 84' (pen.)	Referee: Marco Antonio Rodríguez

Pumas UNAM won 3–2 on aggregate

25 November 2010 Semifinals	Pumas UNAM	0–0	Monterrey	Estadio Olímpico Universitario, Mexico City
9:00pm		Report		Referee: Roberto García

28 November 2010 Semifinals	Monterrey	2–0	Pumas UNAM	Estadio Tecnológico, Monterrey
8:00pm	Suazo 88'; Cardozo 90'	Report		Referee: Marco Antonio Rodríguez

Monterrey won 2–0 on aggregate

=== Goalscorers ===
Position	Nation	Name	Goals scored
1	(Paraguay)	Dante López	7
2	(Argentina)	Martín Bravo	5
2	(Mexico)	Juan Carlos Cacho	5
4	(Mexico)	Javier Cortés	2
5	(Mexico)	Leandro Augusto	1
5	(Mexico)	Israel Castro	1
5	(Mexico)	Jehu Chiapas	1
5	(Mexico)	Luis Fernando Fuentes	1
5	(Mexico)	Marco Antonio Palacios	1
5	(Paraguay)	Darío Verón	1
		Own Goal	1
TOTAL			26

=== Regular season statistics ===
==== Results summary ====
Overall								Home						Away					
Pld	W	D	L	GF	GA	GD	Pts	W	D	L	GF	GA	GD	W	D	L	GF	GA	GD
17	7	4	6	23	24	−1	25	6	2	1	15	6	+9	1	2	5	8	18	−10

Last updated: 29 January 2011.
Source: Apertura 2010 results

==== Results by round ====
Round	1	2	3	4	5	6	7	8	9	10	11	12	13	14	15	16	17
Ground	H	A	H	A	H	A	H	A	H	H	A	H	A	H	A	H	A
Result	W	L	W	L	W	D	L	D	D	W	L	W	L	D	L	W	W
Position	4	10	6	7	5	6	9	8	9	6	10	5	9	9	10	9	8

Updated to match(es) played on 29 January 2011. Source: Apertura 2010 results and mediotiempo.com
A = Away; H = Home; W = Win; D = Draw; L = Loss

== Torneo Clausura ==
=== Squad ===
Note: Flags indicate national team as defined under FIFA eligibility rules; some limited exceptions apply. Players may hold more than one non-FIFA nationality.

No.	Pos.	Nation	Player
1	GK	MEX	Alejandro Palacios
2	DF	MEX	Efraín Velarde
3	DF	MEX	Marco Antonio Palacios
4	DF	PAR	Darío Verón (Captain)
5	MF	MEX	Israel Castro (Vice-Captain)
7	MF	MEX	Leandro Augusto
9	FW	PAR	Dante López
10	FW	ARG	Martín Bravo
11	FW	MEX	Juan Carlos Cacho
13	MF	MEX	Jehu Chiapas
14	DF	MEX	Luis Fernando Fuentes
15	FW	MEX	Javier Cortés
16	MF	MEX	Fernando Espinoza
17	FW	MEX	Juan Francisco Palencia
18	MF	MEX	Fernando Morales

No.	Pos.	Nation	Player
19	MF	MEX	Óscar Ricardo Rojas
20	MF	MEX	David Cabrera
21	DF	MEX	Víctor Manuel Rosales
22	MF	MEX	Carlos Alberto Campos
24	GK	MEX	Odín Patiño
31	GK	MEX	Alfredo Saldívar
33	DF	MEX	Carlos Humberto González
36	DF	MEX	Salvador Medina
49	DF	MEX	Eduardo Manuel Gámez
50	FW	MEX	David Izazola
56	FW	MEX	Alfonso Nieto
59	DF	MEX	Erick Vera
68	MF	MEX	Kevin Quiñones
78	MF	MEX	Carlos Emilio Orrantía

=== Regular season ===
9 January 2011 Round 1	Toluca	1–1	Pumas UNAM	Estadio Nemesio Díez, Toluca
12:00pm	Calderón 37'	Report	Cacho 80'	Referee: Jorge Eduardo Gasso

16 January 2011 Round 2	Pumas UNAM	2–0	Santos Laguna	Estadio Olímpico Universitario, Mexico City
12:00pm	Cacho 62'; López 82'	Report		Referee: Miguel Ángel Flores

22 January 2011 Round 3	Cruz Azul	3–3	Pumas UNAM	Estadio Azul, Mexico City
5:00pm	Villa 25'; Cervantes 36'; Droguett 82'	Report	Cacho 60', 80'; Verón 72'	Referee: Rafael Medina

30 January 2011 Round 4	Pumas UNAM	3–2	Monterrey	Estadio Olímpico Universitario, Mexico City
12:00pm	Cacho 26'; Bravo 40'; Cortés 54'	Report	Suazo 28' (pen.); Martínez 87'	Referee: Mauricio Morales

6 February 2011 Round 5	Puebla	0–1	Pumas UNAM	Estadio Cuauhtémoc, Puebla
12:00pm		Report	Orrantía 89'	Referee: José Alfredo Peñaloza

13 February 2011 Round 6	Pumas UNAM	1–1	Guadalajara	Estadio Olímpico Universitario, Mexico City
12:00pm	Cortés 79'	Report	Báez 78'	Referee: Jorge Macías Romo

18 February 2011 Round 7	San Luis	0–1	Pumas UNAM	Estadio Alfonso Lastras, San Luis Potosí
6:30pm		Report	Bravo 3'	Referee: Roberto García Orozco

27 February 2011 Round 8	Pumas UNAM	5–1	Estudiantes Tecos	Estadio Olímpico Universitario, Mexico City
12:00pm	Castro 7'; Verón 16'; Cortés 74'; López 83'; Orrantía 92'	Report	López 69'	Referee: Miguel Ángel Ortega

5 March 2011 Round 9	Atlante	0–2	Pumas UNAM	Estadio Quintana Roo, Cancún
7:00pm		Report	Bravo 22', 28'	Referee: Francisco Chacón Gutiérrez

13 March 2011 Round 10	Morelia	0–1	Pumas UNAM	Estadio Morelos, Morelia
12:00pm		Report	Palencia 57'	Referee: Miguel Ángel Chacón

20 March 2011 Round 11	Pumas UNAM	0–0	Pachuca	Estadio Olímpico Universitario, Mexico City
12:00pm		Report		Referee: Miguel Ángel Flores

2 April 2011 Round 12	Chiapas	3–1	Pumas UNAM	Estadio Victor Manuel Reyna, Tuxtla Gutiérrez
5:00pm	Salazar 18', 25'; Andrade 33'	Report	Espinoza 77'	Referee: Erim Ramírez Ulloa

10 April 2011 Round 13	Pumas UNAM	2–0	UANL	Estadio Olímpico Universitario, Mexico City
12:00pm

13 April 2011 Round 14	Atlas	0–0	Pumas UNAM	Estadio Jalisco, Guadalajara

17 April 2011 Round 15	Pumas UNAM	3–0	Querétaro	Estadio Olímpico Universitario, Mexico City
12:00pm

22 April 2011 Round 16	Necaxa	0–1	Pumas UNAM	Estadio Victoria, Aguascalientes
8:10pm

1 May 2011 Round 17	Pumas UNAM	0–2	América	Estadio Olímpico Universitario, Mexico City
12:00pm

=== Goalscorers ===
Position	Nation	Name	Goals scored
1	(Mexico)	Juan Carlos Cacho	5
2	(Argentina)	Martín Bravo	4
3	(Mexico)	Javier Cortés	3
4	(Mexico)	Carlos Emilio Orrantía	2
4	(Paraguay)	Dante López	2
4	(Paraguay)	Darío Verón	2
7	(Mexico)	Fernando Espinoza	1
7	(Mexico)	Juan Francisco Palencia	1
7	(Mexico)	Israel Castro	1
TOTAL			21

=== Regular season statistics ===
==== Results summary ====
Overall								Home						Away					
Pld	W	D	L	GF	GA	GD	Pts	W	D	L	GF	GA	GD	W	D	L	GF	GA	GD
12	7	4	1	21	11	+10	25	3	2	0	11	4	+7	4	2	1	10	7	+3

Last updated: 3 April 2011.
Source: Clausura 2011 results

==== Results by round ====
Round	1	2	3	4	5	6	7	8	9	10	11	12	13	14	15	16	17
Ground	A	H	A	H	A	H	A	H	A	A	H	A	H	A	H	A	H
Result	D	W	D	W	W	D	W	W	W	W	D	L					
Position	12	3	4	3	1	3	1	1	1	1	1	1					

Updated to match(es) played on 3 April 2011. Source: Clausura 2011 results and mediotiempo.com
A = Away; H = Home; W = Win; D = Draw; L = Loss
