= 2011–12 Pumas UNAM season =

UNAM
2011–12 season
- Chairman: Víctor Manuel Mahbub
- Manager: Guillermo Vázquez
- Stadium: Estadio Olímpico Universitario
- Apertura 2011: 9th
- Clausura 2012: 13th
- Champions League: Semi-finals
- Top goalscorer: League: Apertura: Martín Bravo; Javier Cortés (4); Clausura: Juan Carlos Cacho (4); All: Martín Bravo (9)
Home colours	Away colours	Third colours

The 2011–12 UNAM season was the 65th professional season of Mexico's top-flight football league. The season is split into two tournaments—the Torneo Apertura and the Torneo Clausura—each with identical formats and each contested by the same eighteen teams. UNAM began their season on July 24, 2011 against San Luis, UNAM play their homes games on Sundays at noon local time.

In addition to the Primera División, UNAM will be participating in the CONCACAF Champions League for the third time in their history. It is their first appearance in the Champions League since 2009–10 where UNAM reached the semifinals. UNAM began their Champions League campaign on August 17, 2011 at home against FC Dallas of Major League Soccer.

== Torneo Apertura ==
=== Squad ===
Note: Flags indicate national team as defined under FIFA eligibility rules; some limited exceptions apply. Players may hold more than one non-FIFA nationality.

No.	Pos.	Nation	Player
1	GK	MEX	Alejandro Palacios
2	DF	MEX	Efraín Velarde
3	DF	MEX	Marco Antonio Palacios
4	DF	PAR	Darío Verón (vice-captain)
5	MF	MEX	Diego De Buen
7	FW	MEX	Javier Cortés
8	MF	MEX	David Cabrera
10	FW	ARG	Martín Bravo
11	FW	MEX	David Izazola
13	GK	MEX	Odín Patiño
14	DF	MEX	Luis Fuentes
15	FW	MEX	Michelle Castro

No.	Pos.	Nation	Player
16	MF	MEX	Fernando Espinoza
17	FW	MEX	Juan Francisco Palencia (captain)
18	MF	MEX	Emilio Orrantía
22	MF	MEX	Carlos Campos
24	FW	MEX	Juan Carlos Cacho
23	DF	MEX	Eduardo Gámez
25	GK	MEX	Alfredo Saldívar
33	DF	MEX	Humberto González
35	FW	MEX	Eduardo Herrera
62	DF	MEX	Neftali Teja
71	DF	MEX	Aarón Alexis Sandoval

=== Regular season ===
==== Apertura 2011 results ====
July 23, 2011 Round 1	UNAM	2–0	San Luis	Estadio Olímpico Universitario, Mexico City
12:00	Cacho 9'; Bravo 36'; Sandoval (yellow card) 36'; Herrera (yellow card) 39'	Report	Alcántar (yellow card) 34'; Orozco (yellow card) 39'	Referee: Ricardo Arellano

July 31, 2011 Round 2	Morelia	0–1	UNAM	Estadio Morelos, Morelia
12:00	Gstelum (yellow card) 59'	Report	Fuentes 7'; M. Palacios (yellow card) 14'; Castro (red card) 77'	Referee: José Alfredo Peñaloza

August 3, 2011 Round 3	UNAM	2–1	Monterrey	Estadio Olímpico Universitario, Mexico City
21:00	Fuentes (yellow card) 20'; Velarde 25'; Herrera 90+1'	Report	Cardozo 32'; Morales (yellow card) 79'	Referee: Erim Ramírez

August 6, 2011 Round 4	Guadalajara	0–0	UNAM	Estadio Omnilife, Zapopan
19:00	Fabián (yellow card) 35'; Araujo (yellow card) 55'; Medina (yellow card) 88'	Report	Palacios (yellow card) 35'	Referee: Mauricio Morales

August 14, 2011 Round 5	UNAM	1–1	Santos Laguna	Estadio Olímpico Universitario, Mexico City
12:00	M. Palacios (yellow card) 48' (yellow-red card) 83'; Verón (yellow card) 69'; Herrera 80'	Report	Cárdenas (yellow card) 43'; Peralta 58'; Salinas (yellow card) 71'; Quintero (yellow card) 83'; Hoyos (red card) 90+2'	Referee: Miguel Ángel Chacón

August 21, 2011 Round 6	Puebla	2–1	UNAM	Estadio Cuauhtémoc, Puebla
12:00	Zamora 13', (yellow card) 14'; Beasley 24', (yellow card) 25'; Ortiz (yellow card) 73'; Victorino (yellow card) 82'; Juárez (yellow card) 90'	Report	Cabrera (yellow card) 18' (yellow-red card) 36'; Espinoza (yellow card) 32'; Cortés (yellow card) 33', (goal) 75'	Referee: Juan Genaro Medrano

August 28, 2011 Round 7	UNAM	1–2	Cruz Azul	Estadio Olímpico Universitario, Mexico City
12:00	Flores 17'; De Buen (yellow card) 55'; Fuentes (red card) 58'; Cortés 75'	Report	Bravo 22'; Domínguez (yellow card) 52'; Gerado Torrado (yellow card) 64'	Referee: Fernando Guerrero

September 10, 2011 Round 8	Querétaro	4–0	UNAM	Estadio Corregidora, Querétaro
17:00	Bueno 38', 44' (pen.), 56'; Martínez (red card) 50'; Niell 63'	Report	Espinzoa (red card) 50'; Cortés (yellow card) 60'; Velarde (yellow card) 75'	Referee: Francisco Chacón

September 18, 2011 Round 9	UNAM	4–1	Toluca	Estadio Victor Manuel Reyna, Tuxtla Gutierrez
17:00	Orrantia 23'; Bravo 45+4' (pen.); Cortés 57' (pen.); Cabrera (yellow card) 74'; Izazola 79'	Report	Alonso 6'; Dueñas (yellow card) 45+1'	Referee: Erim Ramírez

September 24, 2011 Round 10	Estudiantes Tecos	1–2	UNAM	Estadio Tres de Marzo, Zapopan
19:00	Lillingston (yellow card) 7'; Gómez 28'; Colace (yellow card) 83'; Leaño (yellow card) 90+3'	Report	Cortés 12'; Palencia (yellow card) 15', (goal) 62'; Verón (yellow card) 33'; Ramírez (yellow card) 62'	Referee: Jorge Eduardo Gassso

October 1, 2011 Round 11	UNAM	1–0	América	Estadio Olímpico Universitario, Mexico City
16:00	Cabrera (yellow card) 31'; Fuentes 55'; Izazola (yellow card) 70'; M. Palacios (yellow card) 90+2'	Report	Aguilar (yellow card) 18'	Referee: Ricardo Arellano

October 8, 2011 Round 12	UANL	4–1	UNAM	Estadio Universitario, San Nicolás
19:00	Lobos 18'; Juninho 28'; Mancilla 36'; Viniegra 39'; Álvarez (yellow card) 49'; Ayala (yellow card) 69'	Report	Fuentes (yellow card) 17' (yellow-red card) 52'; Ramírez (yellow card) 34'; Velarde (yellow card) 53'; Herrera 82'	Referee: Miguel Ángel Flores

October 9, 2011 Round 13	UNAM	1–4	Atlas	Estadio Olímpico Universitario, Mexico City
17:00	Palencia 37'; M. Palacios (yellow card) 55'; A. Palacios (yellow card) 56'	Report	Lacerda (yellow card) 16'; Bocanegra 31'; Barraza 48', 57'; Arreola 61'	Referee: Roberto García Orozco

October 22, 2011 Round 14	Pachuca	0–0	UNAM	Estadio Hidalgo, Pachuca
19:00	Brambila (yellow card) 26'; Ayoví (yellow card) 29'; Escalante (red card) 34'; Chávez (yellow card) 73'; Esqueda (yellow card) 90+1'	Report	Palencia (yellow card) 89'	Referee: José Alfredo Peñaloza

October 26, 2011 Round 15	UNAM	1–0	Atlante	Estadio Olímpico Universitario, Mexico City
21:00	Espinosa (yellow card) 39' (yellow-red card) 88'; Bravo 73'	Report	Guerrero (yellow card) 35'	Referee: Paul Delgadillo

October 29, 2011 Round 16	Chiapas	4–0	UNAM	Estadio Victor Manuel Reyna, Tuxtla Gutiérrez
17:00	J. Martínez 10', 28' (pen.); Andrade 20', 89'; E. Hernández (yellow card) 72'	Report	Castro (yellow card) 15'; M. Palacios (yellow card) 78'	Referee: Mauricio Morales

November 6, 2011 Round 17	UNAM	1–1	Tijuana	Estadio Olímpico Universitario, Mexico City
12:00	Cortés 10'; Palencia (yellow card) 43'	Report	Santiago (yellow card) 9', (goal) 53'	Referee: Francisco Chacón

UNAM did not qualify to the Final Phase

=== Goalscorers ===
Position	Nation	Name	Goals scored
1.	(Argentina)	Martín Bravo	4
1.	(Mexico)	Javier Cortés	4
3.	(Mexico)	Eduardo Herrera	3
4.	(Mexico)	Luis Fernando Fuentes	2
4.	(Mexico)	Francisco Palencia	2
6.	(Mexico)	Juan Carlos Cacho	1
6.	(Mexico)	David Izazola	1
6.	(Mexico)	Carlos Orrantia	1
6.	(Mexico)	Efraín Velarde	1
TOTAL			19

=== Results ===
==== Results summary ====
Overall								Home						Away					
Pld	W	D	L	GF	GA	GD	Pts	W	D	L	GF	GA	GD	W	D	L	GF	GA	GD
17	7	4	6	19	25	−6	25	5	2	2	14	10	+4	2	2	4	5	15	−10

Last updated: 6 November 2011.
Source: Apertura 2011 results

==== Results by round ====
Round	1	2	3	4	5	6	7	8	9	10	11	12	13	14	15	16	17
Ground	H	A	H	A	H	A	H	A	H	A	H	A	H	A	H	A	H
Result	W	W	W	D	D	L	L	L	W	W	W	L	L	D	L	L	D
Position	4	4	1	1	1	2	5	8	5	5	1	5	7	7	3	7	9

Updated to match(es) played on 6 November 2011. Source: Apertura 2011 results and mediotiempo.com
A = Away; H = Home; W = Win; D = Draw; L = Loss

== Transfers ==
=== In ===
#	Pos	Nat	Player	Age	From	Date	Notes

=== Out ===
#	Pos	Nat	Player	Age	To	Date	Notes
17	MF	(Mexico)	Juan Francisco Palencia	38	Retired	November 28, 2011	

== Torneo Clausura ==
=== Squad ===
Note: Flags indicate national team as defined under FIFA eligibility rules; some limited exceptions apply. Players may hold more than one non-FIFA nationality.

No.	Pos.	Nation	Player
1	GK	MEX	Alejandro Palacios
2	DF	MEX	Efraín Velarde
3	DF	MEX	Marco Antonio Palacios
4	DF	PAR	Darío Verón (vice-captain)
5	MF	MEX	Diego De Buen
7	FW	MEX	Javier Cortés
8	MF	MEX	David Cabrera
10	FW	ARG	Martín Bravo
11	FW	MEX	David Izazola
13	GK	MEX	Odín Patiño
14	DF	MEX	Luis Fuentes
15	MF	MEX	Michel Castro
16	MF	MEX	Fernando Espinoza
18	MF	MEX	Emilio Orrantía

No.	Pos.	Nation	Player
22	MF	MEX	Carlos Campos
23	DF	MEX	Eduardo Gámez
24	FW	MEX	Juan Carlos Cacho
25	GK	MEX	Alfredo Saldívar
33	DF	MEX	Humberto González
35	FW	MEX	Eduardo Herrera
46	FW	MEX	Raúl Servín Molina
62	DF	MEX	Neftali Teja
64	MF	MEX	Erik Vera
65	MF	MEX	José García Fernández
67	MF	MEX	Kevin Quiñones
71	DF	MEX	Aarón Alexis Sandoval
94	MF	MEX	Octavio Pliego Teja

=== Clausura 2012 results ===
January 7, 2012 Round 1	San Luis	1–0	UNAM	Estadio Alfonso Lastras, San Luis Potosí
20:45	Matellán (yellow card) 22' (yellow-red card) 34'; Moreno (yellow card) 23'; Torres (yellow card) 31'; Chiapas 42', (yellow card) 71'	Report	Verón (yellow card) 21'; Campos (yellow card) 33'; Fuentes (yellow card) 61'	Referee: Jorge Isaac Rojas

January 15, 2012 Round 2	UNAM	3–0	Morelia	Estadio Olímpico Universitario, Mexico City
12:00	Cacho 7'; Verón (yellow card) 21'; Bravo 39', (yellow card) 68'; Velarde (yellow card) 75'; Herrera 85'	Report	Huiqui (yellow card) 26'; Gastélum (yellow card) 45+'	Referee: Jorge Antonio Pérez

January 21, 2012 Round 3	Monterrey	1–1	UNAM	Estadio Tecnológico, Monterrey
17:00	Pérez (yellow card) 50'; Arce 61'; Reyna (yellow card) 74'; Corona (yellow card) 90+2'	Report	Cacho 26'	Referee: Miguel Ángel Chacón

January 29, 2012 Round 4	UNAM	0–0	Guadalajara	Estadio Olímpico Universitario, Mexico City
12:00	Palacios (yellow card) 85'	Report	Torres (yellow card) 26'; Nava (yellow card) 53'	Referee: Antony Zanjuampa

February 4, 2012 Round 5	Santos Laguna	2–1	UNAM	Estadio TSM Corona, Torreón
19:00	Suárez 11'; Mares (yellow card) 40'; Peralta (yellow card) 49'; Salinas 65'; Quintero (yellow card) 88'	Report	Palacios (yellow card) 22'; Bravo (yellow card) 32'; Salinas 75' (o.g.); Velarde (yellow card) 79'; Verón (yellow card) 87'	Referee: Miguel Ángel Ortega

February 12, 2012 Round 6	UNAM	0–2	Puebla	Estadio Olímpico Universitario, Mexico City
12:00	Bravo (yellow card) 14'; M. Palacios (yellow card) 56' (yellow-red card) 63'	Report	Landín 5'; Pozos (yellow card) 22'; Luis García 67'	Referee: Marco Antonio Rodríguez

February 18, 2012 Round 7	Cruz Azul	1–1	UNAM	Estadio Azul, Mexico City
17:00	Maranhao (yellow card) 21'; Giménez (yellow card) 38'; Aquino 65'; Pinto (yellow card) 86'	Report	Herrera 21'; García (yellow card) 26'; Cabrera (yellow card) 53'; Cacho (yellow card) 90+3'	Referee: Fabricio Morales

February 26, 2012 Round 8	UNAM	1–1	Querétaro	Estadio Olímpico Universitario, Mexico City
12:00	Cacho 13'; Cortés (yellow card) 37'	Report	Ponce 47'	Referee: Miguel Ángel Ayala

March 4, 2012 Round 9	Toluca	0–2	UNAM	Estadio Nemesio Díez, Toluca
12:00	Ríos (yellow card) 25'; Novaretti (yellow card) 66'; D. de la Torre (yellow card) 69'	Report	Velarde 32', (yellow card) 89'; Verón (yellow card) 32'; M. Palacios (yellow card) 33'; García 61'; Herrera (yellow card) 89'	Referee: Francisco Chacón

March 11, 2012 Round 10	UNAM	0–0	Estudiantes Tecos	Estadio Olímpico Universitario, Mexico City
12:00	Espinoza (yellow card) 76' (yellow-red card) 90+1'	Report	Leaño (yellow card) 39'	Referee: Miguel Ángel Chacón

March 18, 2012 Round 11	América	2–1	UNAM	Estadio Azteca, Mexico City
16:00	Benítez (yellow card) 9'; Mosquera (yellow card) 28'; Herrera (manager) (red card) 82'; Vuoso 86'; Aguilar (yellow card) 90+2'	Report	García (yellow card) 7' (yellow-red card) 80'; Pimentel (yellow card) 55'; Cacho 57' (pen.); Bravo (yellow card) 90+2'	Referee: Jorge Antonio Pérez

March 25, 2012 Round 12	UNAM	0–2	UANL	Estadio Olímpico Universitario, Mexico City
12:00	Velarde (yellow card) 49'; Bravo (yellow card) 53'	Report	Cerda 35'; Rivas (yellow card) 71'; Lobos 77'	Referee: Jorge Isaac Rojas

March 31, 2012 Round 13	Atlas	0–0	UNAM	Estadio Jalisco, Guadalajara
20:45	Ayala (yellow card) 17'	Report	M. Palacios (yellow card) 39'; Gámez (yellow card) 49'; Herrera (yellow card) 90+1'	Referee: Ricardo Arellano

April 8, 2012 Round 14	UNAM	0–1	Pachuca	Estadio Olímpico Universitario, Mexico City
12:00	Sandoval (yellow card) 48'	Report	Franco (yellow card) 47'; Torres (yellow card) 58'; Rodríguez (yellow card) 63'; Borja 80'	Referee: Óscar Macias

April 14, 2012 Round 15	Atlante	1–2	UNAM	Estadio Andrés Quintana Roo, Cancún
21:00	Cuevas 9'; Amione (yellow card) 89'	Report	Jiménez 7' (o.g.); Campos (yellow card) 14'; Espinoza (yellow card) 30'; Orrantía 72'; García (yellow card) 81'; Cortés (yellow card) 90+3'	Referee: Mauricio Morales

April 22, 2012 Round 16	UNAM	0–3	Chiapas	Estadio Olímpico Universitario, Mexico City
12:00			Esqueda (yellow card) 32'; Arizala 46', 85'; J. Martínez 85'	Referee: Roberto García Orozco

April 29, 2012 Round 17	Tijuana	1–1	UNAM	Estadio Caliente, Tijuana
12:00	Riascos (yellow card) 30', (goal) 57'; Abrego (red card) 87'	Report	Espinoza (yellow card) 19'; M. Palacios (yellow card) 30'; Teja (yellow card) 36'; Cortés 89'	Referee: José Alfredo Peñaloza

UNAM did not qualify to the Final Phase

=== Goalscorers ===
Position	Nation	Name	Goals scored
1.	(Mexico)	Juan Carlos Cacho	4
2.	(Mexico)	Eduardo Herrera	3
3.		Own Goals	2
4.	(Argentina)	Martín Bravo	1
4.	(Mexico)	Javier Cortés	1
4.	(Mexico)	José Antonio García	1
4.	(Mexico)	Carlos Emilio Orrantía	1
TOTAL			13

=== Results ===
==== Results summary ====
Overall								Home						Away					
Pld	W	D	L	GF	GA	GD	Pts	W	D	L	GF	GA	GD	W	D	L	GF	GA	GD
17	3	7	7	13	18	−5	16	1	3	4	4	9	−5	2	4	3	9	9	0

Last updated: 29 April 2012.
Source: Clausura 2012 results

==== Results by round ====
Round	1	2	3	4	5	6	7	8	9	10	11	12	13	14	15	16	17
Ground	A	H	A	H	A	H	A	H	A	H	A	H	A	H	A	H	A
Result	L	W	D	D	L	L	D	D	W	D	L	L	D	L	W	L	D
Position	16	9	9	10	12	15	14	14	11	11	13	14	14	15	13	14	13

Updated to match(es) played on 29 April 2012. Source: Clausura 2012 results and mediotiempo.com
A = Away; H = Home; W = Win; D = Draw; L = Loss

== CONCACAF Champions League ==
=== Group Standings ===
Team	Pld	W	D	L	GF	GA	GD	Pts
(Mexico) UNAM	6	3	2	1	8	2	+6	11
(Canada) Toronto FC	6	3	1	2	7	7	0	10
(United States) FC Dallas	6	2	1	3	6	11	−5	7
(Panama) Tauro	6	1	2	3	7	8	−1	5

=== Results ===
August 17, 2011 Group 1	UNAM (Mexico)	0–1	(United States) Dallas	Estadio Olímpico Universitario, Mexico City
22:00	Gámez (yellow card) 45'; Sandoval (yellow card) 58'	Report	Jackson (yellow card) 61'; Chávez 66'; Loyd (yellow card) 85'	Attendance: 4,000; Referee: José Molina (Honduras)

August 25, 2011 Group 2	Tauro (Panama)	0–0	(Mexico) UNAM	Estadio Rommel Fernández, Panama City
20:00		Report		Attendance: 1,621; Referee: Mauricio Navarro (Canada)

September 14, 2011 Group 3	UNAM (Mexico)	4–0	(Canada) Toronto	Estadio Olímpico Universitario, Mexico City
20:00	Bravo 17', 33', 42'; Velarde 21'	Report		Referee: Raymond Bogle (Jamaica)

September 21, 2011 Group 4	Dallas (United States)	0–2	(Mexico) UNAM	Pizza Hut Park, Frisco
20:00		Report	Herrera 84'; Izazola 90+1'	Referee: Walter López (Guatemala)

September 27, 2011 Group 5	Toronto FC (Canada)	1–1	(Mexico) UNAM	BMO Field, Toronto
20:00	Marošević 35'	Report	M. Palacios 51'	Attendance: 9,115; Referee: Neal Brizan (Trinidad and Tobago)

October 19, 2011 Group 6	UNAM (Mexico)	1–0	(Panama) Tauro	Estadio Olímpico Universitario, Mexico City
22:00	Cacho 45'	Report		Referee: Joel Aguilar (El Salvador)

=== Quarter-finals ===
March 8, 2012 Quarter-final	Isidro Metapán (El Salvador)	2–1	(Mexico) UNAM	Estadio Jorge Calero Suárez, Metapán
20:00	Blanco 27', 49'	Report	Herrera 67'	Attendance: 4,131; Referee: Walter López (Guatemala)

March 15, 2012 Quarter-final	UNAM (Mexico)	8–0	(El Salvador) Isidro Metapán	Estadio Olímpico Universitario, Mexico City
22:00	A. Escobar 25' (o.g.); Herrera 26', 63'; Velarde 39'; Bravo 54'; García 69'; Espinoza 73'; Cacho 88'	Report		Attendance: 7,800; Referee: Mark Geiger (United States)

UNAM won 9–2 on aggregate.

=== Semifinals ===
March 28, 2012 Semifinal	Monterrey (Mexico)	3–0	(Mexico) UNAM	Estadio Tecnológico, Monterrey
22:00	Morales 7' de Nigris 60', 72'	Report		Attendance: 26,716; Referee: José Alfredo Peñaloza (Mexico)

April 4, 2012 Semifinal	UNAM (Mexico)	1–1	(Mexico) Monterrey	Estadio Olímpico Universitario, Mexico City
22:00	García 71'	Report	Reyna 35'	Attendance: 7,300; Referee: Mauricio Morales (Mexico)

Monterrey won 4–1 on aggregate.

=== Goalscorers ===
Position	Nation	Name	Goals scored
1.	(Argentina)	Martín Bravo	4
1.	(Mexico)	Eduardo Herrera	4
3.	(Mexico)	Juan Carlos Cacho	2
3.	(Mexico)	José Antonio García	2
3.	(Mexico)	Efraín Velarde	2
6.	(Mexico)	Fernando Espinoza	1
6.	(Mexico)	David Izazola	1
6.	(Mexico)	Marco Antonio Palacios	1
6.		Own goal	1
TOTAL			17

=== Results ===
==== Results summary ====
Overall								Home						Away					
Pld	W	D	L	GF	GA	GD	Pts	W	D	L	GF	GA	GD	W	D	L	GF	GA	GD
6	3	2	1	8	2	+6	11	2	0	1	5	1	+4	1	2	0	3	1	+2

Last updated: 18 August 2011.
Source: Group D results

==== Results by round ====
Round	1	2	3	4	5	6
Ground	H	A	H	A	A	H
Result	L	D	W	W	D	W
Position	4	4	2	1	1	1

Updated to match(es) played on 21 September 2011. Source: Group D results
A = Away; H = Home; W = Win; D = Draw; L = Loss
