= 2011 Primera División de México Clausura Liguilla =

2011 Primera División de México
Tournament details
- Country: Mexico
- Teams: 8

Final positions
- Champions: UNAM
- Runners-up: Morelia
- CONCACAF Champions League: UNAM; Morelia

Tournament statistics
- Matches played: 14
- Goals scored: 37 (2.64 per match)
- Top goal scorer(s): Rafael Márquez Lugo (4 goals)

The Liguilla (English: Mini League) of the 2010 Primera División de México Clausura was a final knockout tournament involving eight teams of the Primera División de México.

UNAM won its seventh title in club history with a 3–2 aggregate victory over Morelia in the Liguilla Final.

== Teams ==
The 18 teams that participated in the 2010 Clausura were divided into three groups of six teams. The top two in each group qualify automatically. The two best teams in the General Table not already qualified, regardless of group, qualify as well.

| S | Team | Manager | Captain | Performance at the Clausura 2011 | | | | | | | | | |
| S | Team | Manager | Captain | Pld | W | D | L | GF | GA | GD | Pts | P | Qualified as |
|---|---|---|---|---|---|---|---|---|---|---|---|---|---|
| 1 | UANL | (Brazil) Ricardo Ferretti | (Argentina) Lucas Lobos | 17 | 10 | 5 | 2 | 26 | 9 | 17 | 35 | 1st | First place Group 1 |
| 2 | UNAM | (Mexico) Guillermo Vázquez | (Mexico) Israel Castro | 17 | 10 | 5 | 2 | 27 | 13 | 14 | 35 | 2nd | First place Group 3 |
| 3 | Morelia | (Mexico) Tomás Boy | (Argentina) Federico Vilar | 17 | 9 | 4 | 4 | 31 | 24 | 7 | 31 | 3rd | Runner-up Group 3 |
| 4 | Atlante | (Mexico) Miguel Herrera | (Mexico) Daniel Guerrero | 17 | 8 | 3 | 6 | 28 | 17 | 11 | 27 | 4th | First place Group 2 |
| 5 | Cruz Azul | (Mexico) Enrique Meza | (Mexico) Gerardo Torrado | 17 | 7 | 5 | 5 | 25 | 20 | 5 | 26 | 5th | Third place Group 3 |
| 6 | América | (Chile) Carlos Reinoso | (Mexico) Guillermo Ochoa | 17 | 8 | 2 | 7 | 31 | 28 | 3 | 26 | 6th | Runner-up Group 2 |
| 7 | Monterrey | (Mexico) Víctor Manuel Vucetich | (Mexico) Luis Ernesto Pérez | 17 | 7 | 5 | 5 | 23 | 20 | 3 | 26 | 7th | Runner-up Group 1 |
| 8 | Guadalajara | (Mexico) José Luis Real | (Mexico) Héctor Reynoso | 17 | 6 | 7 | 4 | 23 | 15 | 8 | 25 | 8th | Third place Group 1 |

== Bracket ==
The eight qualified teams play two games against each other on a home-and-away basis. The winner of each match up is determined by aggregate score.

The teams were seeded one to eight in quarterfinals, and will be re-seeded one to four in semifinals, depending on their position in the general table. The higher seeded teams play on their home field during the second leg.

Quarterfinals
1 | UANL | 1 | 1 | 2
8 | Guadalajara | 3 | 1 | 4
2 | UNAM | 1 | 2 | 3
7 | Monterrey | 3 | 0 | 3
3 | Morelia | 2 | 3 | 5
6 | América | 1 | 2 | 3
4 | Atlante | 1 | 0 | 1
5 | Cruz Azul | 2 | 0 | 2

Semifinals
2 | UNAM | 1 | 2 | 3
8 | Guadalajara | 1 | 0 | 1
3 | Morelia | 0 | 3 | 3
5 | Cruz Azul | 2 | 0 | 2

Finals
2 | UNAM | 1 | 2 | 3
3 | Morelia | 1 | 1 | 2

- If the two teams are tied after both legs, the higher seeded team advances.
- Both finalist qualify to the 2011–12 CONCACAF Champions League. The champion qualifies directly to the group stage, while the runner-up qualifies to the preliminary round.

== Quarter-finals ==
The first legs of the quarterfinals were played on May 4 and 5. The second legs were played on May 7 and 8.

| Team 1 | Agg. | Team 2 | 1st leg | 2nd leg |
|---|---|---|---|---|
| UANL (1) | 2–4 | (8) Guadalajara | 1–3 | 1–1 |
| UNAM (2) | 3–3 | (7) Monterrey | 1–3 | 2–0 |
| Morelia (3) | 5–3 | (6) América | 2–1 | 3–2 |
| Atlante (4) | 1–2 | (5) Cruz Azul | 1–2 | 0–0 |

Kickoffs are given in local time (UTC-5).

=== First leg ===
May 4, 2011
19:00

| Guadalajara | 3–1 | UANL |
|---|---|---|
| Arellano 40' de Luna 58'; Fabián 65' | Report | 48' Molina |

Estadio Omnilife
Guadalajara
Referee: Ricardo Arellano (Mexico)

May 4, 2011
21:00

| Cruz Azul | 2–1 | Atlante |
|---|---|---|
| Giménez 18', 46' | Report | 7' Maldonado |

Estadio Azul
Mexico City
Referee: Miguel Ángel Ortega (Mexico)

May 5, 2011
19:00

| Monterrey | 3–1 | UNAM |
|---|---|---|
| Martínez 11'; Ayoví 21'; Suazo 47' | Report | 70' Bravo |

Estadio Tecnológico
Monterrey
Referee: Juan Genaro Medrano (Mexico)

May 5, 2011
21:00

| América | 1–2 | Morelia |
|---|---|---|
| Márquez 69' | Report | 16' Pérez; 61' Márquez L. |

Estadio Corregidora
Querétaro
Referee: Paul Delgadillo (Mexico)

=== Second leg ===
May 7, 2011
19:00

| UANL | 1–1 | Guadalajara |
|---|---|---|
| Mancilla 64' | Report | 79' Reynoso |

Estadio Universitario
San Nicolás de los Garza
Referee: Mauricio Morales (Mexico)

Guadalajara won 2–4 on aggregate

May 7, 2011
21:00

| Atlante | 0–0 | Cruz Azul |
|---|---|---|
| | Report |

Estadio Andrés Quintana Roo
Cancún
Referee: Ricardo García Orozco (Mexico)

Cruz Azul won 1–2 on aggregate

May 8, 2011
12:00

| UNAM | 2–0 | Monterrey |
|---|---|---|
| Velarde 5'; Fuentes 74' | Report |

Estadio Olímpico Universitario
Mexico City
Referee: Francisco Chacón (Mexico)

UNAM 3–3 Monterrey. UNAM advances as higher seed

May 8, 2011
20:00

| Morelia | 3–2 | América |
|---|---|---|
| Rojas 13', 60'; Márquez L. 46' | Report | 4' Reyes; 64' Vuoso |

Estadio Morelos
Morelia
Referee: Marco Antonio Rodríguez (Mexico)

Morelia won 5–3 on aggregate

== Semi-finals ==
The first legs of the semifinal were played on May 12. The second legs were played on May 15.

| Team 1 | Agg. | Team 2 | 1st leg | 2nd leg |
|---|---|---|---|---|
| UNAM (2) | 3–1 | (8) Guadalajara | 1–1 | 2–0 |
| Morelia (3) | 3–2 | (5) Cruz Azul | 0–2 | 3–0 |

Kickoffs are given in local time (UTC-5).

=== First leg ===
May 12, 2011
19:00

| Guadalajara | 1–1 | UNAM |
|---|---|---|
| Arellano 89' | Report | 51' Velarde |

Estadio Omnilife
Guadalajara
Referee: Paul Delgadillo (Mexico)

May 12, 2011
21:00

| Cruz Azul | 2–0 | Morelia |
|---|---|---|
| Giménez 27'; Villa 45+1' | Report |

Estadio Azul
Mexico City
Referee: Mauricio Morales (Mexico)

=== Second leg ===
May 15, 2011
12:00

| UNAM | 2–0 | Guadalajara |
|---|---|---|
| Cortés 42'; López 75' | Report |

Estadio Olímpico Universitario
Mexico City
Referee: Roberto García Orozco (Mexico)

UNAM won 3–1 on aggregate

May 15, 2011
20:00

| Morelia | 3–0 | Cruz Azul |
|---|---|---|
| Márquez L. 8', 11'; Lozano 88' | Report |

Estadio Morelos
Morelia
Referee: Francisco Chacón (Mexico)

Morelia won 3–2 on aggregate

== Final ==
| Team 1 | Agg. | Team 2 | 1st leg | 2nd leg |
|---|---|---|---|---|
| UNAM (2) | 3–2 | Morelia (3) | 1–1 | 2–1 |

Kickoffs are given in local time (UTC-5).

=== First leg ===
May 19, 2011
20:30

| Morelia | 1–1 | UNAM |
|---|---|---|
| Rojas 72' | Report | Palencia 68' |

Estadio Morelos
Morelia
Referee: Roberto García Orozco (Mexico)

=== Second leg ===
May 22, 2011
12:00

| UNAM | 2–1 | Morelia |
|---|---|---|
| Palencia 14'; Cortés 77' | Report | Lozano 25' |

Estadio Olímpico Universitario
Mexico City
Referee: Marco Antonio Rodríguez Moreno (Mexico)

UNAM won 3–2 on aggregate
