= 2011 Primera División de México Clausura Liguilla Final =

Primera División de México 2011 Clausura Liguilla Final
- Event: 2011 Clausura Liguilla
Morelia	UNAM
(Mexico)	(Mexico)
2	3
- On aggregate

First leg
Morelia	UNAM
1	1
- Date: May 19, 2011 20:30 (UTC-6)
- Venue: Estadio Morelos, Morelia, Michoacán, Mexico
- Referee: Roberto García (Mexico)
- Attendance: 40,000
- Weather: Clear - 84 °F (29 °C)

Second leg
UNAM	Morelia
2	1
- Date: May 22, 2011 12:00 (UTC-6)
- Venue: Estadio Olímpico Universitario, Ciudad Universitaria, Mexico City, Mexico
- Referee: (Mexico)
- Attendance: 63,238
- Weather: Sunny - 91 °F (33 °C)

The 2011 Clausura Liguilla Final is a two-legged football match-up to determine the 2011 Clausura champion.

After 17 regular season matches, and 2 two-legged rounds of Liguilla, UNAM and Morelia reached the final.

UNAM won its seventh title in club history with a 3–2 aggregate victory.

== Final rules ==
Like other match-ups in the knockout round, the teams will play two games, one at each team's home stadium. As the highest seeded team determined at the beginning of the Liguilla, UNAM was to have home-field advantage for the second leg.

However, the tiebreaking criteria used in previous rounds will not be the same in the final. If the teams remained tied after 90 minutes of play during the 2nd leg, extra time will be used, followed by a penalty shootout if necessary.

== Final summary ==
=== First leg ===
May 19, 2011
20:30

Morelia	1 – 1	UNAM
Rojas 72'	Report	Palencia 68'

Estadio Morelos
Morelia, Michoacán
Referee: Roberto García (Mexico)

Monarcas Morelia	UNAM

Monarcas Morelia
GK	3	(Argentina) Federico Vilar (c)
CB	2	(Mexico) Enrique Pérez
CB	16	(Mexico) Adrián Aldrete
CB	33	(Mexico) Joel Huiqui
CM	8	(Mexico) Jorge Gastélum
CM	11	(Ecuador) Joao Rojas
CM	21	(Mexico) Jaime Lozano
RW	77	(Mexico) Elías Hernández
LW	81	(Colombia) Aldo Leão
RF	7	(Mexico) Rafael Márquez Lugo
LF	18	(Colombia) Luis Gabriel Rey (substituted off) 86'
Substitutes
MF	13	(Mexico) Manuel Pérez (substituted on) 86'
Manager
(Mexico) Tomás Boy

UNAM
GK	1	(Mexico) Alejandro Palacios
RB	2	(Mexico) Efraín Velarde (yellow card) 48'
CB	3	(Mexico) Marco Antonio Palacios
CB	4	(Paraguay) Darío Verón (c)
LB	14	(Mexico) Luis Fernando Fuentes
DM	5	(Mexico) Israel Castro
DM	20	(Mexico) David Cabrera (yellow card) 46' (substituted off) 59'
RW	9	(Paraguay) Dante López
LW	10	(Argentina) Martín Bravo (substituted off) 59'
SS	15	(Mexico) Javier Cortés
CF	17	(Mexico) Francisco Palencia (substituted off) 71'
Substitutes
MF	13	(Mexico) Jehu Chiapas (substituted on) 71'
MF	7	(Mexico) Leandro Augusto (substituted on) 59'
FW	11	(Mexico) Juan Carlos Cacho (substituted on) 59'
Manager
(Mexico) Guillermo Vázquez

Man of the Match
Dante López
Assistant referees
(Mexico) José Luis Camargo Callado
(Mexico) Alberto Morín Méndez
Fourth official
(Mexico) Jorge Eduardo Gasso Flores

=== Second leg ===
May 22, 2011
12:00

UNAM	2 – 1	Morelia
Palencia 14' (pen.); Cortés 77'	Report	Lozano 25' (pen.)

Estadio Olímpico Universitario
Coyoacán, Mexico City
Referee: Marco Antonio Rodríguez Moreno (Mexico)

UNAM	Monarcas Morelia

UNAM
GK	1	(Mexico) Alejandro Palacios (yellow card) 24'
RB	2	(Mexico) Efraín Velarde (yellow card) 30'
CB	14	(Mexico) Luis Fernando Fuentes (substituted off) 54'
CB	4	(Paraguay) Darío Verón (yellow card) 87'
LB	3	(Mexico) Marco Antonio Palacios
DM	15	(Mexico) Javier Cortés
DM	20	(Mexico) David Cabrera
RW	5	(Mexico) Israel Castro (c)
LW	17	(Mexico) Juan Francisco Palencia (substituted off) 71'
SS	10	(Argentina) Martín Bravo (substituted off) 46'
CF	9	(Paraguay) Dante López
Substitutes
MF	78	(Mexico) Carlos Emilio Orrantía (substituted on) 46'
MF	7	(Mexico) Leandro Augusto (substituted on) 54'
FW	11	(Mexico) Juan Carlos Cacho (substituted on) 71'
Manager
(Mexico) Guillermo Vázquez

Monarcas Morelia
GK	3	(Argentina) Federico Vilar (c) (yellow card) 12'
CB	2	(Mexico) Enrique Pérez
CB	16	(Mexico) Adrián Aldrete
CB	33	(Mexico) Joel Huiqui
CM	8	(Mexico) Jorge Gastélum (substituted off) 56'
CM	11	(Ecuador) Joao Rojas (yellow card) 80' (substituted off) 90'
CM	21	(Mexico) Jaime Lozano
RW	77	(Mexico) Elías Hernández (substituted off) 79'
LW	81	(Colombia) Aldo Leão
RF	7	(Mexico) Rafael Márquez Lugo
LF	9	(Mexico) Miguel Sabah (yellow card) 18'
Substitutes
MF	14	(Mexico) Luis Miguel Noriega (substituted on) 56' (yellow card) 57'
DF	18	(Mexico) Luis Gabriel Rey (substituted on) 79'
DF	13	(Mexico) Manuel Pérez (substituted on) 90'
Manager
(Mexico) Tomás Boy

Marco Antonio Rodríguez Man of the Match
Javier Cortés
Assistant referees
(Mexico) Alberto Morín
(Mexico) Carlos Ayala
Fourth official
(Mexico) Francisco Chacón
