= Juan Pablo Rodríguez (footballer, born 1982) =

Uruguayan footballer

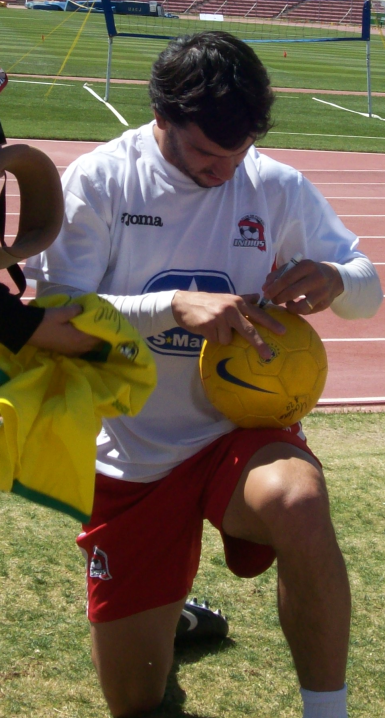

Personal information
- Full name: Juan Pablo Rodríguez Conde
- Date of birth: 14 June 1982 (age 44)
- Place of birth: Montevideo, Uruguay
- Height: 1.67 m (5 ft 5 1/2 in)
- Position: Left winger

Senior career*
| Years | Team | Apps | (Gls) |
| 2001–2002 | Racing | ? | (9) |
| 2003 | Cerro | ? | (1) |
| 2003 | Estudiantes | ? | (?) |
| 2004–2005 | Nacional | 5 | (1) |
| 2005–2007 | Cerrito | ? | (2) |
| 2007–2008 | Racing | ? | (14) |
| 2008 | Defensor Sporting | 14 | (4) |
| 2009 | Racing | 13 | (2) |
| 2009 | Indios | 30 | (3) |
| 2010 | San Luis | 13 | (0) |
| 2010–2013 | All Boys | 70 | (7) |
| 2013 | UNAM | 7 | (0) |
| 2013 | Gimnasia y Esgrima | 10 | (0) |
| 2014 | Ittihad FC | 4 | (1) |
- * Club domestic league appearances and goals as of 18 January 2014

Juan Pablo Rodríguez Conde (born 14 June 1982) is a Uruguayan football midfielder who plays for Ittihad FC in the Saudi Professional League.

== Career ==
Rodríguez started his career at Racing Club de Montevideo in 2001. He played there until 2003 where he was transferred to Argentine Primera División side Estudiantes de La Plata team where he did not enjoyed much success and finally he was purchased by Nacional. After 2 years of success he moved in 2008 to Cerrito, where he was later loaned to Racing Club de Montevideo again. Time later he was purchased by Defensor Sporting, but he played few matches, so again in 2009 he decided to play for Indios de Ciudad Juárez, where his maximum premium was saving the team from relegatio in Primera División de México Clausura 2009.

After half a year in Mexican San Luis, Rodríguez joined All Boys, recently promoted to the Argentine Primera División. In January 2013, he returned to Mexico for UNAM.

== Honours ==
=== Defensor ===
- Uruguayan Primera División: 2007–08

=== Racing ===
- Uruguayan Segunda División: 2007–08
