= Luis Rosas =

Mexican footballer (born 1985)

Luis Rosa
Personal information
- Full name: Luis Ricardo Rosas Pérez
- Date of birth: April 3, 1985 (age 41)
- Place of birth: Mexico D.F., Mexico
- Height: 1.65 m (5 ft 5 in)
- Position: Midfielder

Team information
- Current team: Club León

Senior career*
Years	Team	Apps	(Gls)
2005–2011	UNAM Pumas	3	(0)
2011–2012	Club León		
- * Club domestic league appearances and goals

Luis Ricardo Rosas Pérez (born 3 April 1985) is a former Mexican football player who last played in Club León.

He joined the Pumas youth system at the age of 16 and worked his way through the ranks to make his first division in 2006, is considered a substitute player, but this season he would try to become a regular starter. Currently he is pursuing his master's degree in Advanced Studies in Sports Administration and Technology from the elite AISTS founded by the IOC, IMD Business School, EPFL and other prestigious Swiss academic institutions. He is also the coach of the current football team(Men/Women) of AISTS
