= Jesús Martínez =

Jesús Martínez may refer to:

- Jesús Martínez Rentería ("Palillo", 1913–1994), Mexican actor, for whom the Estadio Jesús Martínez "Palillo" stadium was named
- Jesús Martínez Ross (1934–2025), Mexican politician, governor of Quintana Roo
- Jesús Ramón Martínez de Ezquerecocha Suso (1935−2013), Spanish Roman Catholic prelate
- Jesús Martínez Álvarez (1944–2026), Mexican politician, governor of Oaxaca
- Jesús Martínez (footballer, born 1947), Spanish football player
- Jesús Martínez (footballer, born 1952), Mexican football player
- Jesús Humberto Martínez (born 1956), Mexican politician
- Jesús Martínez (boxer) (born 1976), Mexican boxer
- Shuga Cain (born 1977), American drag queen whose real name is Jesus Martinez
- Jesus Martinez (fighter) (born 1983), American mixed martial artist
- Morenito de Aranda (born 1985), Spanish bullfighter whose real name is Jesús Martínez Barrios
