= Aarón Sandoval =

Mexican footballer (born 1993)

Aarón Alexis Sandoval Ulibarri (born 11 September 1993 in Mexico City) is a former Mexican professional footballer who played for Pumas UNAM. Sandoval began his football career with Pumas' youth team, and he had limited involvement with the club's senior team, making his Liga MX debut in 2011. In 2014, Sandoval moved to Spain to join Espanyol's B team.
