= Arturo Rodríguez (footballer, born 1990) =

Mexican footballer

Arturo Rodríguez Quezada
Personal information
- Full name: Arturo Rodríguez Quezada
- Date of birth: 8 January 1990 (age 36)
- Place of birth: Azcapotzalco, Mexico City, Mexico
- Height: 1.83 m (6 ft 0 in)
- Position: Forward

Youth career
- San Luís
- Necaxa
- 2005–2009: Pumas UNAM

Senior career*
Years	Team	Apps	(Gls)
2009	Pumas UNAM	0	(0)
2009–2013	Pumas Morelos	62	(7)
2013–2014	Irapuato	12	(4)
2015	Pioneros de Cancún	23	(6)
2016	Reynosa	12	(6)
- * Club domestic league appearances and goals as of 31 May 2016

Arturo Rodríguez Quezada (born 8 January 1990) is a Mexican professional footballer who played in the Ascenso MX for Pumas Morelos.

== Life and career ==
Rodríguez was born in Azcapotzalco, Mexico City, to Arturo Rodríguez and his wife Liz Quezada. He played football in the youth systems of both San Luís and Necaxa before joining Pumas UNAM at the age of 15. Playing for Tercera División team Pumas CCH in the last match of the 2008 Clausura, the 18-year-old Rodríguez scored ten goals in a 14–0 defeat of G.R. Sport to make him joint top scorer in the competition with 22.

His first-team debut came in August 2009 in the 2009–10 CONCACAF Champions League Group Stage, as Pumas fielded an inexperienced side against Comunicaciones of Guatemala; he replaced Carlos Orrantia after an hour as his team won 1–0. Rodríguez made two more substitute appearances in the same competition, but those were his last for the senior team. He spent the remainder of his Pumas career with the reserve team, Pumas Morelos, for which he made 62 appearances in the second tier. The team was sold by Pumas midway through the 2012–13 Ascenso MX season and was relegated at the end, after which it folded.

Rodríguez went on to play for third-tier clubs Irapuato, Pioneros de Cancún, and Reynosa. He helped the latter reach the play-offs in 2016, but went into the semi-final second leg carrying an injury and was sent off in stoppage time as Reynosa were eliminated by Murciélagos F.C. Rodríguez left the club at the end of the season once he passed the Liga Premier age limit of 25.
