= Michelle Castro =

Mexican footballer (born 1989)

Personal information
- Full name: Michelle Arturo Castro Galindo
- Date of birth: 9 April 1989 (age 37)
- Place of birth: Mexico City
- Position: Forward

Senior career*
Years	Team	Apps	(Gls)
2011–2012	UNAM	17	(0)
2012–2013	Pumas Morelos	15	(1)
Total		32	(1)
- * Club domestic league appearances and goals

Michelle Arturo Castro Galindo (born April 9, 1989 Mexico City, Mexico) is a Mexican professional footballer who last played for Pumas Morelos.
