= Fernando Morales (footballer, born 1985) =

Mexican footballer

Personal information
- Full name: Fernando Morales Esquer
- Date of birth: 14 September 1985 (age 41)
- Place of birth: Mexico City, Mexico
- Height: 1.74 m (5 ft 9 in)
- Position: Midfielder

Senior career*
Years	Team	Apps	(Gls)
2004–2014	Pumas UNAM	66	(7)
2007	→ Necaxa (loan)	12	(0)
2011–2012	→ San Luis (loan)	7	(0)
2012–2013	→ Morelia (loan)	5	(0)
2013	→ Ljungskile SK (loan)		
- * Club domestic league appearances and goals

Fernando Morales Esquer (born 14 September 1985) also known as El Zurdo is a Mexican former footballer who played as a midfielder.

Morales debuted for Pumas on 21 November 2004, in a defeat game (1–5) against Guadalajara. He was used sparingly by Pumas coach Hugo Sánchez, although he was considered a top prospect. Comparisons were made that Morales was the next Aílton da Silva, a Pumas hero.

He was loaned to Club Necaxa for the Clausura 2007 tournament and returned to Pumas to the Clausura 2008. He is mostly known for his strong left leg. Fernando Morales went on a loan to San Luis in 2012.

== Honours ==
- Mexican Primera División: (3)

Pumas UNAM

- (Mexico) Clausura 2009
- (Mexico) Clausura 2004
- (Mexico) Apertura 2004
