= Neftalí Teja =

Mexican footballer (born 1991)

Neftalí Teja Cisneros (born 3 December 1991 in Texcoco, Mexico) is a Mexican former professional footballer who last played for Tampico Madero F.C.

Teja made his Liga MX debut for Club Universidad Nacional in 2011.
