= Dante López =

Paraguayan footballer (born 1983)

- López with UNAM

Personal information
- Full name: Dante Rafael López Fariña
- Date of birth: 16 August 1983 (age 43)
- Place of birth: Asunción, Paraguay
- Height: 1.85 m (6 ft 1 in)
- Position: Forward

Senior career*
| Years | Team | Apps | (Gls) |
| 1998–2002 | Sol de América | 43 | (3) |
| 2002–2003 | Cerro Porteño | 6 | (1) |
| 2003 | Maccabi Haifa | 10 | (0) |
| 2004 | Córdoba CF | 14 | (0) |
| 2004–2005 | Nacional | 27 | (11) |
| 2005 | Olimpia Asunción | 19 | (12) |
| 2006 | Genoa | 13 | (1) |
| 2006–2007 | Crotone | 36 | (5) |
| 2007–2008 | Libertad | 18 | (5) |
| 2008–2011 | UNAM | 96 | (30) |
| 2011–2013 | Guaraní | 29 | (5) |
| 2013–2014 | Olimpia | 10 | (2) |
| 2014–2016 | UNAM | 59 | (6) |
| 2016–2017 | Zacatepec | 11 | (2) |
| 2017 | Deportivo Capiatá | 3 | (0) |
| Total | | 394 | (83) |

International career
| 2003–2013 | Paraguay | 27 | (2) |
- * Club domestic league appearances and goals

Dante Rafael López Fariña (born 16 August 1983) is a Paraguayan former professional footballer who played as a forward.

López's good form with lowly club Crotone earned him a call up for Paraguay at the 2007 Copa America. His form attracted some interest of a few larger Italian clubs, including Napoli. However, López moved back to Paraguay to play for Libertad, after the relegation of Crotone from Serie B.

== Career ==
López was born in Asunción.

On 9 June 2016, it was announced that Lopez along with Pumas teammate Ludueña would join Zacatepec in the Ascenso MX.

== Honours ==
Libertad

- Paraguayan Primera División: Apertura 2008

UNAM

- Liga MX: Clausura 2009, Clausura 2011

Individual

- Paraguayan 1st Division topscorer: 2005
