= Fernando Espinosa (Mexican footballer) =

Mexican footballer (born 1983)

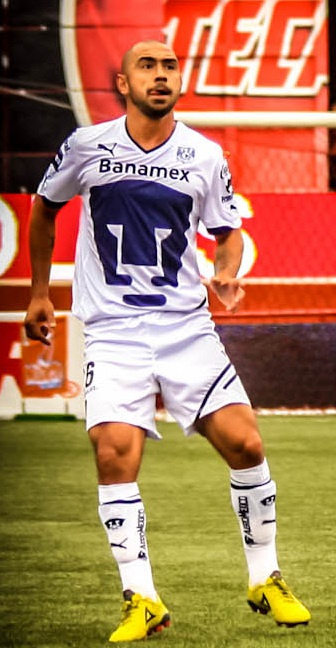

Personal information
- Full name: Fernando Espinosa Barrera
- Date of birth: 9 May 1983 (age 43)
- Place of birth: Mexico City, Mexico
- Height: 1.70 m (5 ft 7 in)
- Position: Midfielder

Team information
- Current team: Galácticos del Caribe (AKL) (Manager)

Senior career*
Years	Team	Apps	(Gls)
2004–2018	UNAM Pumas	161	(2)
2015–2017	→ Atlante (loan)	43	(0)
2017	→ Celaya (loan)	6	(0)

Managerial career
- 2024: West Santos FC (AKL)
- 2025–: Galácticos del Caribe (AKL)
- * Club domestic league appearances and goals

Fernando Espinosa Barrera (born 9 May 1983) is a former Mexican football midfielder who last played for Celaya F.C. in the Ascenso MX

== Club career ==
Espinosa plays for Club Universidad Nacional (commonly called Pumas UNAM), a Mexico City team. He joined the Pumas youth system at age 14 and worked his way through the ranks to make his Primera División debut in 2004.

On December 18, 2014, Espinosa signed for Atlante on loan from Pumas Unam on a season-long loan deal.

== Honours ==
Pumas UNAM

- Primera División de México: Apertura 2004, Clausura 2009
- Champion of Champions: 2004
- Santiago Bernabéu Cup
