= Toño García (footballer, born 1992) =

Mexican footballer

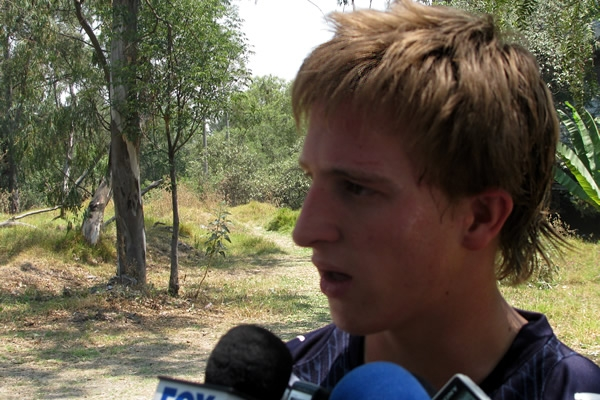
- José García Fernández (2011)

Personal information
- Full name: José Antonio García Fernández
- Date of birth: January 17, 1992 (age 34)
- Place of birth: Mexico D.F., Mexico
- Height: 1.73 m (5 ft 8 in)
- Position: Defender

Senior career*
Years	Team	Apps	(Gls)
2009–2018	UNAM	54	(1)
2015–2016	→ Zacatepec (loan)	26	(0)
- * Club domestic league appearances and goals as of 4 November 2017

José Antonio "Toño" García Fernández (born 17 January 1992) is a former Mexican professional footballer, who played as a defender for UNAM Pumas in Liga MX.

== Career ==
=== Youth ===
García began his career with the Pumas U-20 youth team. So far during the season, he has played seven games and scored one goal. Due to his good playing skills, he has been called up to Pumas first team. He studied in CEAM México school.

=== UNAM ===
Debuted in the Primera División (First Division) versus Puebla in the Cuauhtemoc Stadium and his team lost 2–1, also played his first game against Cruz Azul at CU and also lost by the same score.

José Antonio has also played in the CONCACAF Champions League for Pumas, playing in four games.
