= Kevin Quiñones =

Mexican footballer (born 1992)

Personal information
- Full name: Kevin Quiñones Quintana
- Date of birth: 30 April 1992 (age 34)
- Place of birth: Mexico D.F., Mexico
- Height: 1.75 m (5 ft 9 in)
- Position: Midfielder

Youth career
- 2007–2010: Pumas de la UNAM

Senior career*
Years	Team	Apps	(Gls)
2010–2014	Pumas de la UNAM	5	(0)
2012	Pumas Morelos		
- * Club domestic league appearances and goals as of 8 July 2012

Kevin Quiñones Quintana (born 30 April 1992) is a former Mexican footballer, who last played as a midfielder for Pumas Morelos of the Liga de Ascenso He studied at Colegi Madrid with Diego de Buen and David Izazola. He currently plays for Sport Club Internacional
