= Eduardo Gámez =

Mexican footballer (born 1991)

Eduardo Gamez
Personal information
- Full name: Eduardo Manuel Gámez Piña
- Date of birth: 30 May 1991 (age 35)
- Place of birth: Mexico City, CDMX, Mexico
- Position: Defensive midfielder

Team information
- Current team: Neza FC
- Number: 5

Senior career*
Years	Team	Apps	(Gls)
2008-2011	Pumas Morelos	20	(0)
2011–2012	Pumas UNAM	8	(0)
2012–2013	Pumas Morelos	19	(0)
2013–2016	Lobos BUAP	72	(2)
2020–	Neza FC	10	(0)
- * Club domestic league appearances and goals as of 21 January 2023

Eduardo Manuel Gámez Piña (born 30 May 1991) is a Mexican professional footballer who plays as a defensive midfielder for Liga de Balompié Mexicano club Neza FC.
