= Luis Fuentes (footballer, born 1986) =

Mexican footballer

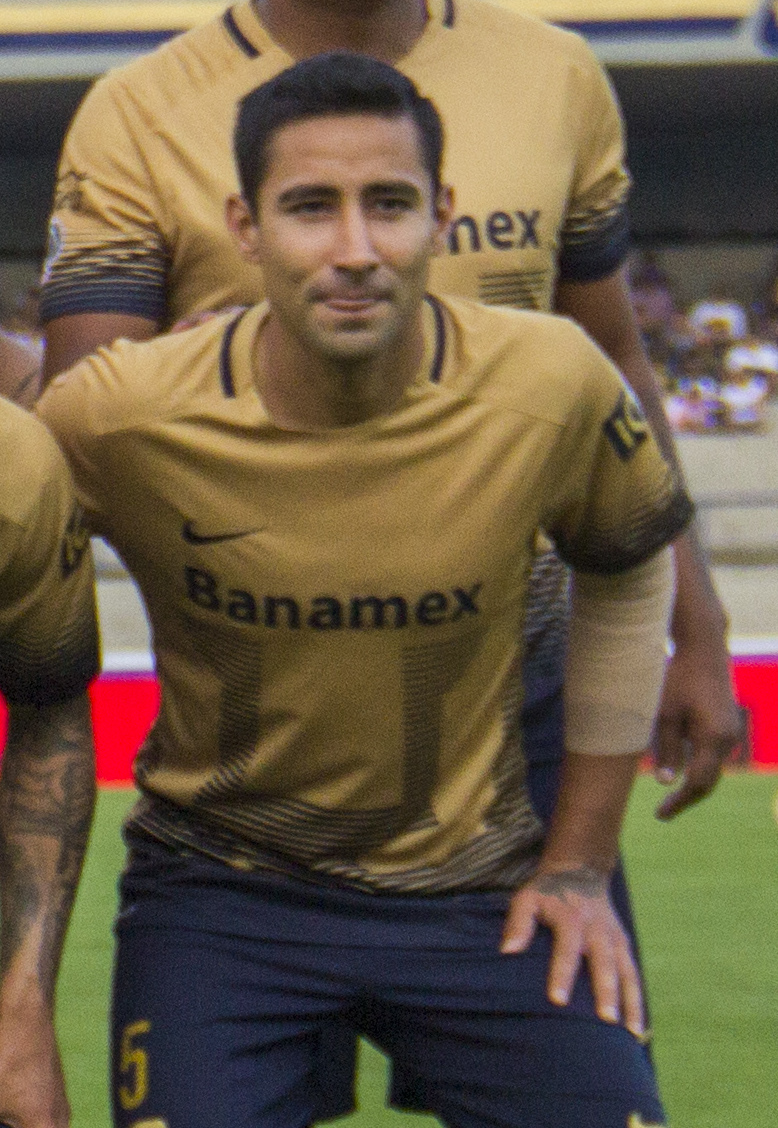
- Fuentes with UNAM in 2016

Personal information
- Full name: Luis Fernando Fuentes Vargas
- Date of birth: 14 September 1986 (age 40)
- Place of birth: Chetumal, Quintana Roo, Mexico
- Height: 1.72 m (5 ft 8 in)
- Position: Left-back

Youth career
- 2007: Pumas Morelos

Senior career*
Years	Team	Apps	(Gls)
2007–2018	UNAM	257	(6)
2017	→ Monterrey (loan)	25	(0)
2018–2020	Tijuana	41	(2)
2020	→ América (loan)	9	(2)
2020–2024	América	121	(1)

International career
2015	Mexico	1	(0)
- * Club domestic league appearances and goals as of 19 May 2024

Luis Fernando Fuentes Vargas (born 14 September 1986) is a Mexican former professional footballer who played as a left-back.

== Club career ==
=== Pumas ===
Fuentes played for Pumas Morelos and was called up by Pumas de la UNAM to be a substitute or to play in the CONCACAF Champions League and Interliga.

Fuentes debut was on 7 March 2009 in a match against San Luis in which he came on as a substitute replacing Fernando Morales on the 82nd minute.

Fuentes was part of the Pumas UNAM squads that won two championships, the Clausura 2009 and the Clausura 2011. For the Apertura 2016, Fuentes was selected team captain, at the suggestion of the team's prior captain, Darío Verón.

==== Loan to Monterrey ====
On 2 December 2016, Fuentes joined Monterrey on a one-year loan agreement beginning with the Clausura 2017 tournament.

=== Xolos ===
Fuentes joined Xolos from Pumas for the Apertura 2018 season.

==== Loan to América ====
On 29 December 2019, Club América announced that Fuentes would be joining the team for the Clausura 2020 on loan from Xolos. After the Clausura 2020 tournament was cancelled due to the COVID-19 pandemic, América did not exercise the option to acquire Fuentes on a permanent deal and returned to Xolos.

=== América ===
On 26 August 2020, Fuentes re-joined Club América on a free transfer after his contract with Xolos ended and the border-town team did not renew it. América sought a defender prior to the transfer window close date as a result of the season-long injury sustained by Bruno Valdez against Monterrey.

== International career ==
Fuentes made his debut for Mexico on 13 November 2015 against El Salvador which Mexico won 3–0.

== Honours ==
UNAM

- Mexican Primera División: Clausura 2009, Clausura 2011

Monterrey

- Copa MX: Apertura 2017

América

- Liga MX: Apertura 2023, Clausura 2024
- Campeón de Campeones: 2024
