= Carlos Campos (footballer, born 1992) =

Mexican footballer

Personal information
- Full name: Carlos Alberto Campos Ávila
- Date of birth: 13 April 1992 (age 34)
- Place of birth: Mexico D.F., Mexico
- Height: 1.73 m (5 ft 8 in)
- Position: Midfielder

Youth career
- 2007–2009: UNAM

Senior career*
Years	Team	Apps	(Gls)
2009–2015	UNAM	23	(0)
2015–2016	Inter Playa del Carmen	44	(10)
2016–2017	Reynosa F.C.	32	(2)
2018	La Piedad	17	(3)
2018–2019	Real Zamora	29	(1)
2019–2020	La Piedad	22	(6)
2021	Cruz Azul Hidalgo	8	(0)

International career^{‡}
2008–2009	Mexico U17	9	(3)
- * Club domestic league appearances and goals as of 2 October 2019 ‡ National team caps and goals as of 2 October 2019

Carlos Alberto Campos Ávila (born 13 April 1992) is a Mexican former footballer who played as a midfielder, most recently for Reboceros de La Piedad in the Liga Premier de México.

== International career ==
Campos represented Mexico at youth level and was part of the squad for the 2009 FIFA U-17 World Cup.

== Pumas Fuerzas Básicas ==
(correct as of 4 January 2011)

Club	Season	Apertura			Apertura Liguilla			Clausura			Clausura Liguilla		
Club	Season	Apps	Goals	Mins	Apps	Goals	Mins	Apps	Goals	Mins	Apps	Goals	Mins
Pumas C.C.H	2007-08	6	1	540	3	0	254	4	1	325	1	0	45
Total		6	1	540	3	0	254	4	1	325	1	0	45
Pumas Morelos	2009-10	1	0	90	0	0	0	0	0	0	0	0	0
Pumas Morelos	2010-11	1	0	22	0	0	0	0	0	0	0	0	0
Total		2	0	102	0	0	0	0	0	0	0	0	0
Pumas U-17	2009-10	3	0	270	0	0	0	0	0	0	0	0	0
Total		3	0	270	0	0	0	0	0	0	0	0	0
Pumas U-20	2009-10	8	1	720	0	0	0	0	0	0	0	0	0
Pumas U-20	2010-11	13	1	1112	0	0	0	0	0	0	0	0	0
Total		21	2	1832	0	0	0	0	0	0	0	0	0
Career total		32	3	2744	3	0	254	4	1	325	1	0	45
