= Martín Bravo =

Argentine footballer (born 1986)

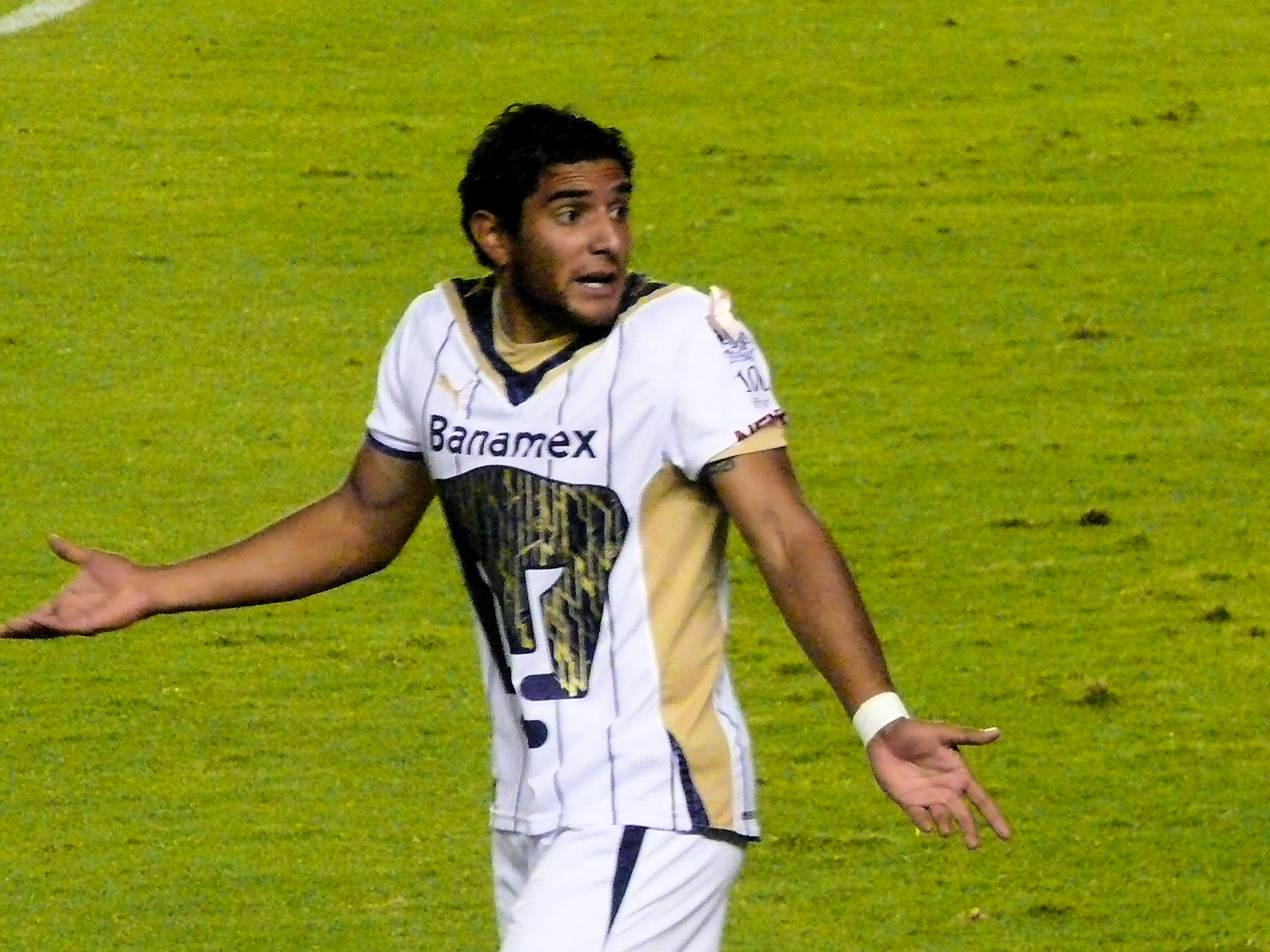
- Bravo with UNAM

Personal information
- Full name: Martín Ivan Bravo
- Date of birth: 19 September 1986 (age 40)
- Place of birth: Santa Fe, Argentina
- Height: 1.65 m (5 ft 5 in)
- Position: Striker

Team information
- Current team: Pumas UNAM U-21 (manager)

Senior career*
Years	Team	Apps	(Gls)
2005–2007	Colón	15	(0)
2007–2008	→ San Martín SJ (loan)	22	(9)
2008–2014	UNAM	192	(49)
2014–2015	León	20	(3)
2015–2016	→ Sinaloa (loan)	14	(0)
2016	→ Santos Laguna (loan)	22	(5)
2017–2018	Veracruz	17	(1)
2018–2020	San Martín SJ	31	(7)
2020–2021	Central Norte	7	(1)
2022	Tlaxcala	20	(2)
Total		351	(154)

Managerial career
- 2023–2026: Puebla Reserves and Academy
- 2025: Puebla (Interim)
- 2026–: Pumas UNAM U-21
- * Club domestic league appearances and goals

Martín Ivan Bravo (born 19 September 1986) is an Argentine football manager and former player. He played as a striker.

== Career ==
Bravo was born in Santa Fe. After a slow start to his career with his home town club Colón de Santa Fe In 2007, he joined San Martín de San Juan on loan where he established himself as a first team player and a regular goalscorer during the opening stages of the Clausura 2008 tournament. He finished the season as one of the topscoring players with 9 goals in 19 games. In late 2008 Bravo had problems in his transfer to Pumas UNAM. His first game was vs. Chivas (a Pumas bitter rival). Bravo got injured in the game and ended his playing season. The game ended in a tie. In Clausura 2009 he became champions with Pumas eliminating Tecos, Puebla, and beat Pachuca to be champions. He holds Mexican citizenship.

On 2 June 2014, he joined León in a trade for former León striker Matias Britos who moved to Pumas UNAM for the Apertura 2014.

On 29 November 2015, Club Santos Laguna announced that Bravo would be joining the squad for the Clausura 2016 on loan from Dorados de Sinaloa.

On August 16th 2025, in the wee hours of the morning, Martin Bravo was announced as the Interim Manager of Club Puebla after the sacking of Pablo Guede.

== Honours ==
UNAM

- Mexican Primera División: Clausura 2009, Clausura 2011
