= Primera División de México Clausura 2009 =

Primera División de México
- Season: 2008−09
- Champions: UNAM (6th title)
- Relegated: Necaxa
- Champions League: UNAM (group stage); Pachuca (preliminary round)
- Copa Sudamericana: Monterrey; Puebla
- Interliga: Toluca; America; Morelia; Atlas; Guadalajara; UANL; Pachuca; Tecos
- SuperLiga: San Luis; Santos Laguna; UANL; Atlas
- Matches: 153
- Goals: 421 (2.75 per match)
- Top goalscorer: Héctor Mancilla (14 goals)
- Biggest home win: Guadalajara 5–0 Pachuca (February 28, 2009)
- Biggest away win: Atlas 0–5 Pachuca (May 9, 2009)

The 2009 Primera División Clausura was the second football tournament of the Mexican Primera División 2008−09 season. The tournament began on January 16, 2009 and ended on May 31, 2009. Necaxa was relegated to the Primera División A after being in last place of the relegation table. On May 31, 2009 UNAM defeated Pachuca 3–2 on aggregate to win their sixth title. Toluca forward Héctor Mancilla won his second consecutive golden boot after scoring 14 goals, only one ahead of América forward Salvador Cabañas.

== Clubs ==
Locations of the Primera División 2008–09 teams

=== Stadia and locations ===
| Club | Stadium | Capacity | City |
|---|---|---|---|
| América | Azteca | 105,000 | Mexico City |
| Atlante | Andrés Quintana Roo | 20,000 | Cancún |
| Atlas | Jalisco | 56,713 | Guadalajara |
| Chiapas | Víctor Manuel Reyna | 23,208 | Tuxtla Gutiérrez |
| Ciudad Juárez | Olímpico Benito Juárez | 22,300 | Ciudad Juárez |
| Cruz Azul | Estadio Azul | 35,000 | Mexico City |
| Guadalajara | Jalisco | 56,713 | Guadalajara |
| Monterrey | Tecnológico | 38,000 | Monterrey |
| Morelia | Morelos | 41,500 | Morelia |
| Necaxa | Victoria | 25,000 | Aguascalientes |
| Pachuca | Hidalgo | 30,000 | Pachuca |
| Puebla | Cuauhtémoc | 42,649 | Puebla |
| San Luis | Alfonso Lastras Ramírez | 24,000 | San Luis Potosí |
| Santos Laguna | Corona | 18,050 | Torreón |
| Toluca | Nemesio Díez | 27,000 | Toluca |
| UAG | 3 de Marzo | 30,015 | Guadalajara |
| UANL | Universitario | 45,000 | Monterrey |
| UNAM | Olímpico Universitario | 63,000 | Mexico City |

=== Personnel ===
| Club | Owner | President | Manager |
|---|---|---|---|
| América | Televisa | (Mexico) Michel Bauer | (Mexico) Jesús Ramírez |
| Atlante | Grupo Pegaso | (Paraguay) Miguel Couchonal | (Mexico) José Cruz |
| Atlas | Atlas A.C. | (Mexico) Fernando Acosta | (Argentina) Ricardo La Volpe |
| Chiapas | State of Chiapas | (Mexico) Antonio Castañón | (Mexico) Luis Fernando Tena |
| Ciudad Juárez | YVASA | (Mexico) Francisco Ibarra | (Uruguay) Héctor Eugui |
| Cruz Azul | Cemento Cruz Azul | (Mexico) Guillermo Álvarez | (Mexico) Benjamín Galindo |
| Guadalajara | Jorge Vergara | (Mexico) Jorge Vergara | (Mexico) Francisco Ramírez |
| Monterrey | FEMSA | (Mexico) Jorge Urdiales | (Mexico) Víctor Vucetich |
| Morelia | TV Azteca | (Mexico) Álvaro Dávila | (Mexico) Tomás Boy |
| Necaxa | Televisa | (Mexico) Roberto Muñoz | (Mexico) Raúl Arias |
| Pachuca | Jesús Martínez | (Mexico) Jesús Martínez | (Mexico) Enrique Meza |
| Puebla | Francisco Bernat | (Mexico) Ricardo Mezher | (Mexico) José Sánchez |
| San Luis | Televisa | (Mexico) Eduardo del Villar | (Argentina) Luis Scatolaro |
| Santos Laguna | Grupo Modelo | (Mexico) Alejandro Irarragorri | (Mexico) Sergio Bueno |
| Toluca | Valentín Diez | (Mexico) Fernando Corona | (Mexico) José de la Torre |
| UAG | UAG | (Mexico) José Leaño | (Mexico) Miguel Herrera |
| UANL | CEMEX | (Mexico) Enrique Borja | (Argentina) José Pekerman |
| UNAM | UNAM | (Mexico) Víctor Mahbub | (Brazil) Ricardo Ferretti |

=== Managerial changes ===
| Team | Outgoing manager | Manner of departure | Date of vacancy | Replaced by | Date of appointment | Position in table |
|---|---|---|---|---|---|---|
| Atlas | (Argentina) Darío Franco | Resigned | Jan. 26, 2009 | (Argentina) Ricardo La Volpe | Jan. 28, 2009 | 17th |
| América | (Argentina) Ramón Díaz | Sacked | Feb. 10, 2009 | (Mexico) Jesús Ramírez | Feb. 11, 2009 | 12th |
| Morelia | (Mexico) Luis Fernando Tena | Sacked | Feb. 20, 2009 | (Mexico) Tomás Boy | Feb. 20, 2009 | 11th |
| UANL | (Mexico) Manuel Lapuente | Sacked | Feb. 22, 2009 | (Argentina) José Pekerman | Feb. 23, 2009 | 17th |
| Guadalajara | (Mexico) Efraín Flores | Sacked | Mar. 23, 2009 | (Mexico) Omar Arellano | Mar. 30, 2009 | 12th |
| Santos Laguna | (Mexico) Daniel Guzmán | Sacked | Mar. 24, 2009 | (Mexico) Sergio Bueno | Mar. 25, 2009 | 14th |
| Guadalajara | (Mexico) Omar Arellano | Resigned | Apr. 16, 2009 | (Mexico) Paco Ramírez | Apr. 16, 2009 | 9th |
| Cruz Azul | (Mexico) Benjamín Galindo | Sacked | May. 4, 2009 | (Uruguay) Robert Siboldi | May. 5, 2009 | 18th |

== League table ==
| Pos | Team | Pld | W | D | L | GF | GA | GD | Pts | Qualification |
|---|---|---|---|---|---|---|---|---|---|---|
| 1 | Pachuca | 17 | 11 | 3 | 3 | 42 | 23 | +19 | 36 | Advanced to final phase |
| 2 | Toluca | 17 | 10 | 6 | 1 | 34 | 19 | +15 | 36 | Advanced to final phase |
| 3 | UNAM | 17 | 8 | 4 | 5 | 23 | 17 | +6 | 28 | Advanced to final phase |
| 4 | Monterrey | 17 | 7 | 5 | 5 | 28 | 22 | +6 | 26 | Advanced to final phase |
| 5 | Puebla | 17 | 7 | 5 | 5 | 21 | 24 | −3 | 26 | Advanced to final phase |
| 6 | UAG | 17 | 6 | 7 | 4 | 21 | 17 | +4 | 25 | Advanced to final phase |
| 7 | Ciudad Juárez | 17 | 5 | 8 | 4 | 21 | 22 | −1 | 23 | Advanced to final phase |
| 8 | América | 17 | 6 | 5 | 6 | 25 | 27 | −2 | 23 | |
| 9 | Santos Laguna | 17 | 5 | 7 | 5 | 25 | 20 | +5 | 22 | |
| 10 | Morelia | 17 | 5 | 7 | 5 | 19 | 20 | −1 | 22 | |
| 11 | Guadalajara | 17 | 5 | 6 | 6 | 21 | 20 | +1 | 21 | |
| 12 | Chiapas | 17 | 5 | 6 | 6 | 22 | 24 | −2 | 21 | Advanced to final phase |
| 13 | Atlas | 17 | 5 | 6 | 6 | 22 | 29 | −7 | 21 | |
| 14 | Atlante | 17 | 3 | 8 | 6 | 18 | 21 | −3 | 17 | |
| 15 | San Luis | 17 | 4 | 5 | 8 | 21 | 27 | −6 | 17 | |
| 16 | UANL | 17 | 2 | 8 | 7 | 15 | 26 | −11 | 14 | |
| 17 | Necaxa | 17 | 3 | 5 | 9 | 17 | 30 | −13 | 14 | |
| 18 | Cruz Azul | 17 | 2 | 7 | 8 | 26 | 33 | −7 | 13 | |

Source: FeMexFut
Rules for classification: 1) points; 2) goal difference; 3) number of goals scored.

== Regular phase ==
Group 1
| Pos | Team | Pld | W | D | L | GF | GA | GD | Pts |
|---|---|---|---|---|---|---|---|---|---|
| 1 | Pachuca (A) | 17 | 11 | 3 | 3 | 42 | 23 | +19 | 36 |
| 2 | Monterrey (A) | 17 | 7 | 5 | 5 | 28 | 22 | +6 | 26 |
| 3 | Puebla (Q) | 17 | 7 | 5 | 5 | 21 | 24 | −3 | 26 |
| 4 | Ciudad Juárez (Q) | 17 | 5 | 8 | 4 | 21 | 22 | −1 | 23 |
| 5 | Santos Laguna | 17 | 5 | 7 | 5 | 25 | 20 | +5 | 22 |
| 6 | Atlante | 17 | 3 | 8 | 6 | 18 | 21 | −3 | 17 |

(A) Advances to the Final Phase as the two-best teams in their group.; (Q) Advances to the Final Phase as the two-highest teams in the general table not already advanced by the above method.

Group 2
| Pos | Team | Pld | W | D | L | GF | GA | GD | Pts |
|---|---|---|---|---|---|---|---|---|---|
| 1 | UNAM (A) | 17 | 8 | 4 | 5 | 23 | 17 | +6 | 28 |
| 2 | UAG (A) | 17 | 6 | 7 | 4 | 21 | 17 | +4 | 25 |
| 3 | América | 17 | 6 | 5 | 6 | 25 | 27 | −2 | 23 |
| 4 | Morelia | 17 | 5 | 7 | 5 | 19 | 20 | −1 | 22 |
| 5 | Guadalajara | 17 | 5 | 6 | 6 | 21 | 20 | +1 | 21 |
| 6 | Cruz Azul | 17 | 2 | 7 | 8 | 26 | 33 | −7 | 13 |

(A) Advances to the Final Phase as the two-best teams in their group.

Group 3
| Pos | Team | Pld | W | D | L | GF | GA | GD | Pts |
|---|---|---|---|---|---|---|---|---|---|
| 1 | Toluca (A) | 17 | 10 | 6 | 1 | 34 | 19 | +15 | 36 |
| 2 | Chiapas (A) | 17 | 5 | 6 | 6 | 22 | 24 | −2 | 21 |
| 3 | Atlas | 17 | 5 | 6 | 6 | 22 | 29 | −7 | 21 |
| 4 | San Luis | 17 | 4 | 5 | 8 | 21 | 27 | −6 | 17 |
| 5 | UANL | 17 | 2 | 8 | 7 | 15 | 26 | −11 | 14 |
| 6 | Necaxa | 17 | 3 | 5 | 9 | 17 | 30 | −13 | 14 |

Updated to match(es) played on May 3, 2009. Source: FeMexFut
Rules for classification: 1) points; 2) goal difference; 3) number of goals scored.
(A) Advances to the Final Phase as the two-best teams in their group.

== Results ==
| Home \ Away | AMÉ | ATE | ATL | CHI | CIU | CAZ | GUA | MON | MOR | NEC | PAC | PUE | SLU | SLA | TOL | UAG | UNL | UNM |
|---|---|---|---|---|---|---|---|---|---|---|---|---|---|---|---|---|---|---|
| América | | | 2–2 | | 3–3 | | | | | 1–0 | 1–3 | | 0–2 | | 2–2 | 1–2 | | 0–0 |
| Atlante | 3–1 | | | 0–2 | | | 2–2 | 0–1 | 2–0 | | | 0–1 | | 2–1 | | | 1–1 | |
| Atlas | | 1–0 | | | 3–1 | | | | | 4–1 | 0–5 | | | | 0–0 | 0–0 | 1–1 | 2–0 |
| Chiapas | 0–0 | | 2–1 | | | 3–3 | 2–0 | 1–0 | 2–2 | | | 2–4 | 1–2 | 0–2 | | | | |
| Ciudad Juárez | | 0–0 | | 1–1 | | | 3–1 | 1–1 | 2–0 | | | | | 0–0 | | | 2–2 | 0–0 |
| Cruz Azul | 1–3 | 0–0 | 4–0 | | 0–1 | | | | | | | 1–2 | 2–2 | | | | 1–1 | 2–3 |
| Guadalajara | 1–0 | | 0–1 | | | 3–3 | | | | 1–1 | 5–0 | 0–0 | 1–0 | | 1–2 | 1–0 | | |
| Monterrey | 2–3 | | 2–2 | | | 3–1 | 1–2 | | | 3–0 | 2–0 | 4–0 | 1–0 | | 3–3 | | | |
| Morelia | 1–0 | | 4–2 | | | 1–1 | 1–1 | 2–2 | | | 2–0 | 1–2 | 0–0 | 2–1 | | | | |
| Necaxa | | 1–1 | | 2–1 | 2–2 | 2–4 | | | 2–0 | | | | | 2–2 | | 1–3 | 1–0 | 1–2 |
| Pachuca | | 1–1 | | 5–1 | 3–0 | 3–0 | | | | 3–0 | | | | | 3–1 | 3–2 | 4–1 | 3–2 |
| Puebla | 2–3 | | 1–1 | | 0–2 | | | | | 1–0 | 2–2 | | 2–1 | | 0–2 | 1–1 | | |
| San Luis | | 1–1 | 2–1 | | 4–1 | | | | | 1–1 | 1–2 | | | | 1–5 | 3–3 | | 0–2 |
| Santos Laguna | 1–2 | | 4–0 | | | 2–2 | 2–1 | 2–0 | | | 2–2 | 0–0 | 3–1 | | 2–2 | | | |
| Toluca | | 3–3 | | 1–0 | 1–0 | 3–1 | | | 2–1 | 1–0 | | | | | | 1–1 | 4–1 | 1–0 |
| UAG | | 2–1 | | 0–0 | 1–2 | 1–0 | | 2–3 | 0–0 | | | | | 1–0 | | | 0–0 | 2–0 |
| UANL | 2–3 | | | 0–3 | | | 1–0 | 0–0 | 1–1 | | | 1–2 | 1–0 | 1–1 | | | | |
| UNAM | | 3–1 | | 1–1 | | | 1–1 | 3–0 | 0–1 | | | 3–1 | | 1–0 | | | 2–1 | |

Updated to match(es) played on 10 May 2009. Source: FeMexFut
Legend: Blue = home team win; Yellow = draw; Red = away team win.

== Final phase (Liguilla) ==
Quarterfinals
1 | Pachuca | 3 | 2 | 5
8 | Jaguares | 1 | 0 | 1
2 | Toluca | 0 | 0 | 0
7 | Ciudad Juárez | 1 | 0 | 1
3 | UNAM | 0 | 3 | 3
6 | UAG | 2 | 0 | 2
4 | Monterrey | 1 | 2 | 3
5 | Puebla | 3 | 2 | 5

Semifinals
1 | Pachuca | 2 | 2 | 4
7 | Ciudad Juárez | 0 | 3 | 3
3 | UNAM | 2 | 1 | 3
5 | Puebla | 1 | 2 | 3

Finals
1 | Pachuca | 0 | 2 | 2
3 | UNAM | 1 | 2 | 3

Champions

6th title

Notes

- If the two teams are tied after both legs, the higher seeded team advances.
- Both finalist qualify to the 2009–10 CONCACAF Champions League. The champion qualifies directly to the Group Stage, while the runner-up qualifies to the Preliminary Round.

== Awards ==
| Award | Player | Team |
|---|---|---|
| MVP | (Argentina) Christian Giménez | Pachuca |
| Best Manager | (Brazil) Ricardo Ferretti | UNAM |
| Best Goalkeeper | (Mexico) Jose de Jesus Corona | UAG |
| Best Wingback | (Mexico) Mario Méndez | Toluca |
| Best Centre back | (Paraguay) Paulo da Silva | Toluca |
| Best Defensive Midfielder | (Mexico) Israel Castro | UNAM |
| Best Offensive Midfielder | (Argentina) Christian Giménez | Pachuca |
| Best Forward | (Chile) Héctor Mancilla | Toluca |
| Best Rookie | (Mexico) Jorge Gastelum | Morelia |
| Golden Boot | (Chile) Héctor Mancilla | Toluca |
Source:Medio Tiempo

== Top goalscorers ==
| Rank | Player | Club | Goals |
|---|---|---|---|
| 1 | (Chile) Héctor Mancilla | Toluca | 14 |
| 2 | (Paraguay) Salvador Cabañas | Club América | 13 |
| 3 | (Mexico) Miguel Sabah | Morelia | 11 |
| 4 | (Chile) Humberto Suazo | Monterrey | 9 |
| 4 | (Argentina) Christian Giménez | Pachuca | 9 |
| 6 | (Panama) Blas Pérez | Pachuca | 8 |
| 7 | (Uruguay) Alvaro González | Puebla | 7 |
| 7 | (Argentina) Alfredo Moreno | Necaxa | 7 |
| 7 | (Ecuador) Christian Benítez | Santos Laguna | 7 |
| 7 | (Brazil) Danilinho | Jaguares | 7 |
| 7 | Source: FeMexFut | | |

== Relegation ==
Relegation is determined by a quotient of the total points earned in the Primera División divided by the total number of games played over the past three seasons of the Primera División (for clubs that have not been the Primera División all three season, the last consecutive seasons of participation are taken into account). The club with the lowest quotient is relegated to the Primera División A for the next season.

| P | Club | Total Points | Total Games | Quotient |
|---|---|---|---|---|
| 1 | Toluca | 170 | 102 | 1.6667 |
| 2 | Pachuca | 168 | 102 | 1.6471 |
| 3 | Guadalajara | 167 | 102 | 1.6373 |
| 4 | Cruz Azul | 153 | 102 | 1.5000 |
| 5 | San Luis | 152 | 102 | 1.4902 |
| 6 | UNAM | 147 | 102 | 1.4412 |
| 7 | Santos Laguna | 146 | 102 | 1.4314 |
| 8 | América | 140 | 102 | 1.3725 |
| 9 | Atlante | 138 | 102 | 1.3529 |
| 10 | Morelia | 131 | 102 | 1.2843 |
| 11 | Atlas | 130 | 102 | 1.2745 |
| 12 | Monterrey | 129 | 102 | 1.2647 |
| 13 | Ciudad Juárez | 42 | 34 | 1.2353 |
| 14 | Chiapas | 125 | 102 | 1.2255 |
| 15 | UAG | 122 | 102 | 1.1961 |
| 16 | Puebla | 79 | 68 | 1.1618 |
| 17 | UANL | 112 | 102 | 1.0980 |
| 18 | Necaxa | 110 | 102 | 1.0784 |
Source: FeMexFut; Updated as of: May 3, 2009

Relegated to Primera División A
