= 2002–03 Toluca FC season =

Toluca
2002–03 season
- Chairman: Rafael Lebrija
- Manager: Ricardo La Volpe (until 26 October); Wilson Graniolatti (from 26 October to 7 December); Alberto Jorge (from 9 December)
- Stadium: Estadio Nemesio Díez
- Apertura: Winners (2nd)
- Clausura: Quarterfinals (5th)
- CONCACAF Champions' Cup: Final^{[A]}
- Top goalscorer: League: José Cardozo (58 goals); All: José Cardozo (59 goals)
- Biggest win: Toluca 6–0 UAG (19 October 2002)
- Biggest defeat: Santos Laguna 5–2 Toluca (24 November 2002)
Home colours	Away colours

The 2002–03 season was Toluca's 85th season in existence and their 50th consecutive season in the top flight of Mexican football. The club participated in the Apertura and Clausura tournaments of the Mexican Primera División and in the 2003 CONCACAF Champions' Cup (the entire tournament, except for the finals, were played on the first semester of 2003). Toluca were crowned champions of the Apertura 2002 tournament after defeating Morelia in the final.

In an unusual situation, Toluca had three different managers during the season. Ricardo La Volpe left the team after the 15th round of the Apertura tournament after being called to the Mexico national football team and appointed manager, substituting Javier Aguirre. La Volpe was replaced by Wilson Graniolatti, who resigned on 7 December, citing differences with Toluca's front office, specially with the chairman Rafael Lebrija. Graniolatti was replaced by Alberto Jorge, head of the Reserves and Academy, hired to manage the team for the rest of the playoffs (four games only). Since Jorge managed to win the Apertura tournament, he was ratified as manager of the team for the second half of the season.

This season remains as a highlight both in Mexican football and Toluca's history. Paraguayan striker José Cardozo broke several scoring records: Cardozo scored 29 goals in the Apertura 2002 regular season and was crowned as the tournament's top scorer; 36 goals in the Apertura 2002 tournament, including playoffs; and 58 goals in the 2002–03 Primera División season. All the three records remain unbeaten as of 2020.

== Players ==
=== Apertura ===
No.	Pos.	Nat.	Name	Date of birth (age)	Since
1	GK	(Argentina)	Hernán Cristante	16 September 1969 (aged 32)	1993
2	DF	(Mexico)	Christian Ramírez	8 August 1978 (aged 23)	2002
3	DF	(Argentina)	Maximiliano Cuberas	16 August 1973 (aged 28)	2001
4	DF	(Mexico)	Hassan Viades	10 January 1978 (aged 24)	1999
5	MF	(Mexico)	Israel López	29 September 1974 (aged 27)	2002
6	MF	(Mexico)	Octavio Valdez	7 December 1973 (aged 28)	2002
7	DF	(Mexico)	Salvador Carmona (Captain)	22 August 1975 (aged 26)	1993
8	MF	(Mexico)	Rafael García	14 August 1974 (aged 27)	1998
9	FW	(Paraguay)	José Cardozo	19 March 1971 (aged 31)	1995
10	MF	(Brazil)	Sinha	23 May 1976 (aged 26)	1999
11	FW	(Uruguay)	Vicente Sánchez	7 December 1979 (aged 22)	2001
12	GK	(Mexico)	César Lozano	31 May 1977 (aged 25)	2002
14	DF	(Argentina)	Ariel Franco	2 June 1979 (aged 23)	2002
15	FW	(Mexico)	Uzziel Lozano	27 November 1981 (aged 20)	2000
16	DF	(Mexico)	Miguel Almazán	6 May 1982 (aged 20)	2002
18	DF	(Mexico)	José Manuel Cruzalta	8 April 1978 (aged 24)	2001
19	MF	(Mexico)	Sergio Amaury Ponce	13 August 1981 (aged 20)	2001
21	DF	(Mexico)	José Armando Núñez	15 September 1978 (aged 23)	2002
23	MF	(Mexico)	Erik Espinosa	13 January 1980 (aged 22)	2000
25	DF	(Mexico)	Edgar García	24 May 1980 (aged 22)	2002
28	FW	(Mexico)	Édgar González	3 July 1980 (aged 22)	2002
30	GK	(Mexico)	Mario Albarrán	4 January 1968 (aged 34)	1998
37	MF	(Mexico)	Josué Castillejos	14 April 1981 (aged 21)	2002

=== Clausura ===
No.	Pos.	Nat.	Name	Date of birth (age)	Since
1	GK	(Argentina)	Hernán Cristante	16 September 1969 (aged 33)	1993
3	DF	(Argentina)	Maximiliano Cuberas	16 August 1973 (aged 29)	2001
4	DF	(Mexico)	Hassan Viades	10 January 1978 (aged 25)	1999
5	MF	(Mexico)	Israel López	29 September 1974 (aged 28)	2002
6	MF	(Mexico)	Octavio Valdez	7 December 1973 (aged 29)	2002
7	DF	(Mexico)	Salvador Carmona (Captain)	22 August 1975 (aged 27)	1993
8	MF	(Mexico)	Rafael García	14 August 1974 (aged 28)	1998
9	FW	(Paraguay)	José Cardozo	19 March 1971 (aged 31)	1995
10	MF	(Brazil)	Sinha	23 May 1976 (aged 26)	1999
11	FW	(Uruguay)	Vicente Sánchez	7 December 1979 (aged 23)	2001
12	GK	(Mexico)	César Lozano	31 May 1977 (aged 25)	2002
14	DF	(Argentina)	Ariel Franco	2 June 1979 (aged 23)	2002
16	DF	(Mexico)	Miguel Almazán	6 May 1982 (aged 20)	2002
18	DF	(Mexico)	José Manuel Cruzalta	8 April 1978 (aged 24)	2001
19	MF	(Mexico)	Sergio Amaury Ponce	13 August 1981 (aged 21)	2001
21	DF	(Mexico)	José Armando Núñez	15 September 1978 (aged 24)	2002
23	MF	(Mexico)	Erik Espinosa	13 January 1980 (aged 22)	2000
25	DF	(Mexico)	Edgar García	24 May 1980 (aged 22)	2002
28	FW	(Mexico)	Édgar González	3 July 1980 (aged 22)	2002
30	GK	(Mexico)	Mario Albarrán	4 January 1968 (aged 35)	1998
37	MF	(Mexico)	Josué Castillejos	14 April 1981 (aged 21)	2002

== Transfers ==
=== In ===
No.	Pos.	Nat.	Player	Moving from	Type	Transfer window	Ref.
2	DF	(Mexico)	Christian Ramírez	UNAM	Transfer	Summer	
5	MF	(Mexico)	Israel López	Guadalajara	Transfer	Summer	
6	MF	(Mexico)	Octavio Valdez	América	Transfer	Summer	
14	DF	(Argentina)	Ariel Franco	(Argentina) River Plate	Loan	Summer	
16	DF	(Mexico)	Miguel Almazán	Academy	Promotion	Summer	
21	DF	(Mexico)	José Armando Núñez	Necaxa	Transfer	Summer	
28	FW	(Mexico)	Édgar González	Academy	Promotion	Summer	
37	MF	(Mexico)	Josué Castillejos	Academy	Promotion	Summer	

=== Out ===
No.	Pos.	Nat.	Player	Moving to	Type	Transfer window	Ref.
–	DF	(Mexico)	Omar Blanco	Atlas	Transfer	Summer	
15	FW	(Uruguay)	Carlos María Morales	Atlas	Transfer	Summer	
2	DF	(Mexico)	Christian Ramírez	Morelia	Transfer	Winter	
15	FW	(Mexico)	Uzziel Lozano	(Uruguay) Fénix	Transfer	Winter	

== Competitions ==
=== Overview ===
Competition	First match	Last match	Starting round	Final position	Record							
Competition	First match	Last match	Starting round	Final position	Pld	W	D	L	GF	GA	GD	Win %
Apertura	3 August 2002	21 December 2002	Matchday 1	Winners	25	16	5	4	70	33	+37	64.00
Clausura	12 January 2003	31 May 2003	Matchday 1	Quarterfinals (5th)	21	10	4	7	43	34	+9	47.62
CONCACAF Champions' Cup	12 March 2003	30 April 2003	First round	Semifinals^{1}	6	4	1	1	15	11	+4	66.67
Total					52	30	10	12	128	78	+50	57.69

Source: Mediotiempo.com

1. Toluca qualified to the 2003 CONCACAF Champions' Cup final, to be played on the next season.

=== Torneo Apertura ===
==== League table ====
Pos	Team	Pld	W	D	L	GF	GA	GD	Pts	Qualification
1	América	19	13	4	2	34	14	+20	43	Directly qualified to the Liguilla (Playoffs)
2	Toluca	19	12	5	2	55	25	+30	41	Directly qualified to the Liguilla (Playoffs)
3	UNAM	19	10	3	6	39	35	+4	33	Directly qualified to the Liguilla (Playoffs)
4	Morelia	19	9	5	5	35	23	+12	32	Directly qualified to the Liguilla (Playoffs)
5	UAG	19	8	5	6	26	29	−3	29	Directly qualified to the Liguilla (Playoffs)

Source: MedioTiempo

==== Matches ====
3 August 2002 1	Toluca	3–0	Necaxa	Toluca, State of Mexico
15:00	Cardozo 64', 73', 80'	Report		Stadium: Estadio Nemesio Díez; Referee: Paul Delgadillo

11 August 2002 2	Atlante	2–3	Toluca	Tlalpan, Mexico City
19:00	S. González 60'; Baños 89'	Report	Cardozo 41'; Sinha 51'; Espinosa 76'	Stadium: Estadio Azteca; Referee: Armando Archundia

17 August 2002 3	Toluca	4–1	Morelia	Toluca, State of Mexico
15:00	Sinha 8', 70'; Cardozo 21', 42'	Report	Íñiguez 69'	Stadium: Estadio Nemesio Díez; Referee: Felipe Ramos Rizo

25 August 2002 4	UNAM	1–4	Toluca	Coyoacán, Mexico City
12:00	Espinosa 57' (o.g.)	Report	Sinha 23'; Cardozo 30'; García 62'; Sánchez 67'	Stadium: Estadio Olímpico Universitario; Referee: Marco Antonio Rodríguez

31 August 2002 5	Toluca	1–1	Veracruz	Toluca, State of Mexico
15:00	García 63'	Report	Casartelli 36'	Stadium: Estadio Nemesio Díez; Referee: Paul Delgadillo

7 September 2002 6	Monterrey	3–1	Toluca	Monterrey, Nuevo León
17:00	de Nigris 30', 59'; Franco 52'	Report	Sinha 5'	Stadium: Estadio Tecnológico; Referee: Eduardo Brizio

11 September 2002 7	Celaya	2–2	Toluca	Celaya, Guanajuato
17:00	da Silva 70'; Latorre 89'	Report	Cardozo 30', 48'	Stadium: Estadio Miguel Alemán Valdés; Referee: José de Jesús Robles

14 September 2002 8	Toluca	1–0	Atlas	Toluca, State of Mexico
15:00	González 66'	Report		Stadium: Estadio Nemesio Díez; Referee: Gilberto Alcalá

22 September 2002 9	Querétaro	0–2	Toluca	Querétaro City, Querétaro
12:00		Report	Cardozo 26'; López 44'	Stadium: Estadio Corregidora; Referee: Manuel Glower

14 September 2002 10	Toluca	5–0	Puebla	Toluca, State of Mexico
15:00	Cardozo 17', 28', 89' (pen.); Sánchez 45'; Ramírez 85'	Report	Mascorro 90'	Stadium: Estadio Nemesio Díez; Referee: José Abramo Lira

6 October 2002 11	América	1–2	Toluca	Tlalpan, Mexico City
16:00	Pardo 8'	Report	Cruzalta 24'; Cardozo 86'	Stadium: Estadio Azteca; Referee: Felipe Ramos Rizo

12 October 2002 12	Toluca	5–1	Chiapas	Toluca, State of Mexico
15:00	García 38'; Cardozo 68', 78', 81'; González 83'	Report	del Olmo 34'	Stadium: Estadio Nemesio Díez; Referee: Germán Arredondo

16 October 2002 13	Cruz Azul	1–1	Toluca	Benito Juárez, Mexico City
17:00	Abreu 33'	Report	Cardozo 79'	Stadium: Estadio Azul; Referee: Jorge Eduardo Gasso

19 October 2002 14	Toluca	6–0	UAG	Toluca, State of Mexico
15:00	Sánchez 11', 25', 29'; Cardozo 35', 80'; García 67'	Report		Stadium: Estadio Nemesio Díez; Referee: José de Jesús Robles

26 October 2002 15	UANL	2–2	Toluca	San Nicolás de los Garza, Nuevo León
17:00	Olalde 36'; Gaitán 45'	Report	García 13'; Cardozo 81'	Stadium: Estadio Universitario; Referee: Armando Archundia

2 November 2002 16	Toluca	5–1	Pachuca	Toluca, State of Mexico
15:00	Cardozo 30', 43', 60', 66'; Velázquez 82' (o.g.)	Report	Núñez 79'	Stadium: Estadio Nemesio Díez; Referee: Antonio Marrufo

10 November 2002 17	Guadalajara	3–3	Toluca	Guadalajara, Jalisco
12:00	J. Sánchez 6'; Vázquez 32'; Mora 51'	Report	Cardozo 60', 69'; Carmona 68'	Stadium: Estadio Jalisco; Referee: Gilberto Alcalá

16 November 2002 18	Toluca	3–1	San Luis	Toluca, State of Mexico
15:00	Sinha 5'; González 23'; Cardozo 66'	Report	de Faria 82'	Stadium: Estadio Nemesio Díez; Referee: Germán Arredondo

24 November 2002 19	Santos Laguna	5–2	Toluca	Torreón, Coahuila
16:00	Lillingston 1', 16', 35', 59'; Manjarín 23'	Report	Sánchez 69'; Cardozo 87'	Stadium: Estadio Corona; Referee: José Abramo Lira

==== Playoffs ====
===== Quarterfinals =====
4 December 2002 First leg	Guadalajara	2–1	Toluca	Guadalajara, Jalisco
20:45	J. García 84'; Mora 88'	Report	Cardozo 56'	Stadium: Estadio Jalisco; Referee: Germán Arredondo

7 December 2002 Second leg	Toluca	3–0 (4–2 agg.)	Guadalajara	Toluca, State of Mexico
15:00	Carmona 74'; Cardozo 77'; Sánchez 89'	Report		Stadium: Estadio Nemesio Díez; Referee: Gilberto Alcalá

===== Semifinals =====
11 December 2002 First leg	Santos Laguna	3–5	Toluca	Torreón, Coahuila
15:00	Borgetti 18'; Rodríguez 47'; Altamirano 55'	Report	Cardozo 22', 32'; Sánchez 42'; Cuberas 70'; Sinha 71'	Stadium: Estadio Corona; Referee: Antonio Marrufo

14 December 2002 Second leg	Toluca	2–1 (7–4 agg.)	Santos Laguna	Toluca, State of Mexico
15:00	Cardozo 32', 81'	Report	Borgetti 28'	Stadium: Estadio Nemesio Díez; Referee: Armando Archundia

===== Final =====
18 December 2002 First leg	Morelia	1–0	Toluca	Morelia, Michoacán
20:00	Saavedra 58'	Report		Stadium: Estadio Morelos; Referee: Eduardo Brizio

21 December 2002 Second leg	Toluca	4–1 (4–2 agg.)	Morelia	Toluca, State of Mexico
15:00	Carmona 32'; López 40'; Cardozo 50'; García 64'	Report	Bautista 1'	Stadium: Estadio Nemesio Díez; Referee: Felipe Ramos Rizo

=== Torneo Clausura ===
==== League table ====
Pos	Team	Pld	W	D	L	GF	GA	GD	Pts	Qualification
3	Monterrey	19	9	7	3	31	22	+9	34	Directly qualified to the Liguilla (Playoffs)
4	UANL	19	10	4	5	25	22	+3	34	Directly qualified to the Liguilla (Playoffs)
5	Toluca	19	10	3	6	40	30	+10	33	Directly qualified to the Liguilla (Playoffs)
6	Atlas	19	8	8	3	29	20	+9	32	Directly qualified to the Liguilla (Playoffs)
7	Veracruz	19	9	5	5	23	18	+5	32	Directly qualified to the Liguilla (Playoffs)

Source: MedioTiempo

==== Matches ====
12 January 2003 1	Necaxa	3–0	Toluca	Tlalpan, Mexico City
16:00	Larrosa 21'; Alves 77'; Acosta 85'	Report		Stadium: Estadio Azteca; Referee: Sergio Silva

18 January 2003 2	Toluca	2–3	Atlante	Toluca, State of Mexico
15:00	Cardozo 7', 63' (pen.)	Report	S. González 43' (pen.), 74'; Paredes 86'	Stadium: Estadio Nemesio Díez; Referee: José Abramo Lira

25 January 2003 3	Morelia	1–1	Toluca	Morelia, Michoacán
17:00	Almirón 84'	Report	Cardozo 18'	Stadium: Estadio Morelos; Referee: Armando Archundia

1 February 2003 4	Toluca	5–1	UNAM	Toluca, State of Mexico
15:00	Cardozo 50', 80'; Sánchez 73', 78', 84'	Report	Trujillo 74'	Stadium: Estadio Nemesio Díez; Referee: Hugo León Guajardo

8 February 2003 5	Veracruz	1–0	Toluca	Boca del Río, Veracruz
17:00	Arce 18'	Report		Stadium: Estadio Luis "Pirata" Fuente; Referee: Marco Antonio Rodríguez

15 February 2003 6	Toluca	3–1	Monterrey	Toluca, State of Mexico
15:00	Cardozo 4', 61'; Rotchen 27' (o.g.)	Report	Alex Fernandes 40'	Stadium: Estadio Nemesio Díez; Referee: Manuel Glower

22 February 2003 7	Toluca	4–1	Cuernavaca	Toluca, State of Mexico
15:00	Almazán 37'; Cardozo 63'; García 68'; Sinha 85'	Report	Leandro Rodrígues 49'	Stadium: Estadio Nemesio Díez; Referee: Germán Arredondo

1 March 2003 8	Atlas	1–1	Toluca	Guadalajara, Jalisco
20:45	Morales 62'	Report	Salazar 14' (o.g.)	Stadium: Estadio Jalisco; Referee: Armando Archundia

8 March 2003 9	Toluca	4–0	Querétaro	Toluca, State of Mexico
15:00	Cardozo 11', 74'; Valdez 56', 65'	Report		Stadium: Estadio Nemesio Díez; Referee: Mauricio Morales

16 March 2003 10	Puebla	3–1	Toluca	Puebla City, Puebla
14:00	Caballero 38'; Vázquez 53', 60'	Report	Carmona 90'	Stadium: Estadio Cuauhtémoc; Referee: Jorge Eduardo Gasso

22 March 2003 11	Toluca	3–0	América	Toluca, State of Mexico
15:00	Sánchez 10'; Cardozo 28', 57'	Report		Stadium: Estadio Nemesio Díez; Referee: Germán Arredondo

29 March 2003 12	Chiapas	1–1	Toluca	Tuxtla Gutiérrez, Chiapas
15:00	Damasceno 56'	Report	Sánchez 51'	Stadium: Estadio Víctor Manuel Reyna; Referee: Marco Antonio Rodríguez

6 April 2003 13	Toluca	1–3	Cruz Azul	Toluca, State of Mexico
12:00	Cardozo 57'	Report	Corona 62'; Cacho 79', 88'	Stadium: Estadio Nemesio Díez; Referee: Gilberto Alcalá

12 April 2003 14	UAG	3–0	Toluca	Zapopan, Jalisco
15:00	Castillo 60'; Camps 83'; Vega 88'	Report		Stadium: Estadio Tres de Marzo; Referee: Mauricio Morales

19 April 2003 15	Toluca	3–1	UANL	Toluca, State of Mexico
15:00	Cardozo 37', 90' (pen.); López 78'	Report	Gaitán 33'	Stadium: Estadio Nemesio Díez; Referee: Sergio Silva

27 April 2003 16	Pachuca	0–1	Toluca	Pachuca, Hidalgo
12:00		Report	Cardozo 33'	Stadium: Estadio Hidalgo; Referee: Manuel Glower

3 May 2003 17	Toluca	3–2	Guadalajara	Toluca, State of Mexico
15:00	Sánchez 20', 32', 53'	Report	Mora 29', 51'	Stadium: Estadio Nemesio Díez; Referee: Germán Arredondo

10 May 2003 18	San Luis	2–3	Toluca	San Luis Potosí City, San Luis Potosí
19:00	de Faria 14', 66'	Report	Cardozo 57', 65'; Valdez 85'	Stadium: Estadio Alfonso Lastras; Referee: Gilberto Alcalá

17 May 2003 19	Toluca	4–3	Santos Laguna	Toluca, State of Mexico
17:00	Cardozo 3', 25', 73'; Sinha 69'	Report	Borgetti 11'; Reyes 36'; Ruiz 38'	Stadium: Estadio Nemesio Díez; Referee: Mauricio Morales

==== Playoffs ====
===== Quarterfinals =====
28 May 2003 First leg	Toluca	1–2	UANL	Toluca, State of Mexico
17:00	Valdez 50'	Report	Kléber 70', 88'	Stadium: Estadio Nemesio Díez; Referee: Germán Arredondo

31 May 2003 Second leg	UANL	2–2 (4–3 agg.)	Toluca	San Nicolás de los Garza, Nuevo León
20:00	Alex Mineiro 10'; Kléber 24'	Report	Cardozo 68'; Franco 71'	Stadium: Estadio Universitario; Referee: Felipe Ramos Rizo

=== CONCACAF Champions' Cup ===
==== Knockout phase ====
===== Round of 16 =====
12 March 2003 First leg	Toluca (Mexico)	3–2	(Trinidad and Tobago) W Connection	Toluca, Mexico
	Sánchez 65', 83'; E. García 77'		Ronaldo Viana 18'; Davies 38'	Stadium: Estadio Nemesio Díez

2 April 2003 Second leg	W Connection (Trinidad and Tobago)	3–3 (5–6 agg.)	(Mexico) Toluca	Marabella, Trinidad and Tobago
	Jean 47'; Spann 69' (pen.); Isaac 73'	Report	Franco 15', 67'; Sinha 62'	Stadium: Manny Ramjohn Stadium; Referee: Mark Forde (Barbados)

===== Quarterfinals =====
9 April 2003 First leg	Municipal (Guatemala)	1–2	(Mexico) Toluca	Guatemala City, Guatemala
	Acevedo 41'	Report	Cardozo 9'; Almazán 84'	Stadium: Estadio Mateo Flores; Referee: Nery Alfaro (El Salvador)

16 April 2003 Second leg	Toluca (Mexico)	2–1 (4–2 agg.)	(Guatemala) Municipal	Toluca, Mexico
	Ruiz 25'; Sánchez 41'	Report	Romero 10'	Stadium: Estadio Nemesio Díez; Referee: Greivin Porras (Costa Rica)

===== Semifinals =====
30 April 2003 First leg	Toluca (Mexico)	1–4	(Mexico) América	Toluca, Mexico
	González 13'	Report	Lipatín 34', 62'; Mariscal 56'; Blanco 83' (pen.)	Stadium: Estadio Nemesio Díez; Referee: Jorge Eduardo Gasso (Mexico)

30 April 2003 Second leg	América (Mexico)	0–4 (a.e.t.) (4–5 agg.)	(Mexico) Toluca	Mexico City, Mexico
			Espinosa 70'; E. García 73', 88'; Ruiz 92'	Stadium: Estadio Azteca; Referee: Marco Antonio Rodríguez (Mexico)

Final to be played on the next season.

== Statistics ==
=== Appearances and goals ===
No.	Pos.	Player	Total		Apertura		Clausura		Champions' Cup	
No.	Pos.	Player	Apps	Goals	Apps	Goals	Apps	Goals	Apps	Goals
1	GK	(Argentina) Hernán Cristante	37	0	22	0	15	0	0	0
3	DF	(Argentina) Maximiliano Cuberas	48	1	25	1	19	0	4	0
4	DF	(Mexico) Hassan Viades	23	0	6	0	13	0	4	0
5	MF	(Mexico) Israel López	48	3	25	2	21	1	2	0
6	MF	(Mexico) Octavio Valdez	48	4	25	0	21	4	2	0
7	DF	(Mexico) Salvador Carmona	45	4	25	3	18	1	2	0
8	MF	(Mexico) Rafael García	51	7	25	6	21	1	5	0
9	FW	(Paraguay) José Cardozo	46	59	25	36	20	22	1	1
10	MF	(Brazil) Sinha	49	10	25	7	21	2	3	1
11	FW	(Uruguay) Vicente Sánchez	40	19	20	8	17	8	3	3
12	GK	(Mexico) César Lozano	8	0	0	0	5	0	3	0
14	DF	(Argentina) Ariel Franco	25	3	13	0	5	1	6	2
16	DF	(Mexico) Miguel Almazán	8	1	3	0	4	0	1	1
18	DF	(Mexico) José Manuel Cruzalta	34	1	12	1	18	0	4	0
19	MF	(Mexico) Sergio Amaury Ponce	29	0	16	0	6	0	6	0
21	DF	(Mexico) José Armando Núñez	5	0	0	0	1	0	4	0
23	MF	(Mexico) Erik Espinosa	48	2	25	1	19	0	4	1
25	DF	(Mexico) Edgar García	7	3	3	0	0	0	4	3
28	FW	(Mexico) Édgar González	36	5	15	3	17	1	5	1
30	GK	(Mexico) Mario Albarrán	10	0	4	0	3	0	3	0
37	MF	(Mexico) Josué Castillejos	12	0	6	0	4	0	2	0
64	MF	(Mexico) Diego de la Torre	2	0	0	0	0	0	2	0
68	FW	(Mexico) Emmanuel Ruiz	5	2	0	0	1	0	4	2
?	DF	(Mexico) Octavio Mira	2	0	0	0	0	0	2	0
?	MF	(Mexico) Isaac Moreno	2	0	0	0	0	0	2	0
?	MF	(Mexico) Armando Palomino	1	0	0	0	0	0	1	0
?	DF	(Mexico) José Luis Rodríguez	1	0	0	0	0	0	1	0
Players that left the club during the season
2	DF	(Mexico) Christian Ramírez	16	0	16	0	–	–	–	–
15	FW	(Mexico) Uzziel Lozano	4	0	4	0	–	–	–	–

=== Goalscorers ===
Rank	Pos.	Player	Apertura	Clausura	Champions' Cup	Total
1	FW	(Paraguay) José Cardozo	36	22	1	59
2	FW	(Uruguay) Vicente Sánchez	8	8	3	19
3	MF	(Brazil) Sinha	7	2	1	10
4	MF	(Mexico) Rafael García	6	1	0	7
5	FW	(Mexico) Édgar González	3	1	1	5
6	DF	(Mexico) Salvador Carmona	3	1	0	4
6	MF	(Mexico) Octavio Valdez	0	4	0	4
8	MF	(Mexico) Israel López	2	1	0	3
8	DF	(Argentina) Ariel Franco	0	1	2	3
8	DF	(Mexico) Edgar García	0	0	3	3
11	MF	(Mexico) Erik Espinosa	1	0	1	2
11	FW	(Mexico) Emmanuel Ruiz	0	0	2	2
13	DF	(Mexico) Miguel Almazán	0	0	1	1
13	DF	(Mexico) José Manuel Cruzalta	1	0	0	1
13	DF	(Argentina) Maximiliano Cuberas	1	0	0	1
13	DF	(Mexico) Christian Ramírez	1	0	0	1
Own goals			1	2	0	3
Total			70	43	15	128

=== Hat-tricks ===
Player	Against	Result	Date	Competition	Ref.
(Paraguay) José Cardozo	Necaxa	3–0 (H)	3 August 2002	Primera División	
(Paraguay) José Cardozo	Puebla	5–0 (H)	14 September 2002	Primera División	
(Paraguay) José Cardozo	Chiapas	5–1 (H)	12 October 2002	Primera División	
(Uruguay) Vicente Sánchez	UAG	6–0 (H)	19 October 2002	Primera División	
(Paraguay) José Cardozo	Pachuca	5–1 (H)	2 November 2002	Primera División	
(Uruguay) Vicente Sánchez	UNAM	5–1 (A)	1 February 2003	Primera División	
(Uruguay) Vicente Sánchez	Guadalajara	3–2 (H)	3 May 2003	Primera División	
(Paraguay) José Cardozo	Santos Laguna	4–3 (H)	17 May 2003	Primera División	

=== Own goals ===
Player	Against	Result	Date	Competition
(Mexico) Erik Espinosa	UNAM	4–1 (A)	25 August 2002	Primera División

== Notes ==
A. Toluca qualified to the 2003 CONCACAF Champions' Cup final, to be played on the team's next season.
