= Toluca FC 6–0 Club América (2003) =

Domestic football match in Toluca, Mexico

Toluca FC v Club América
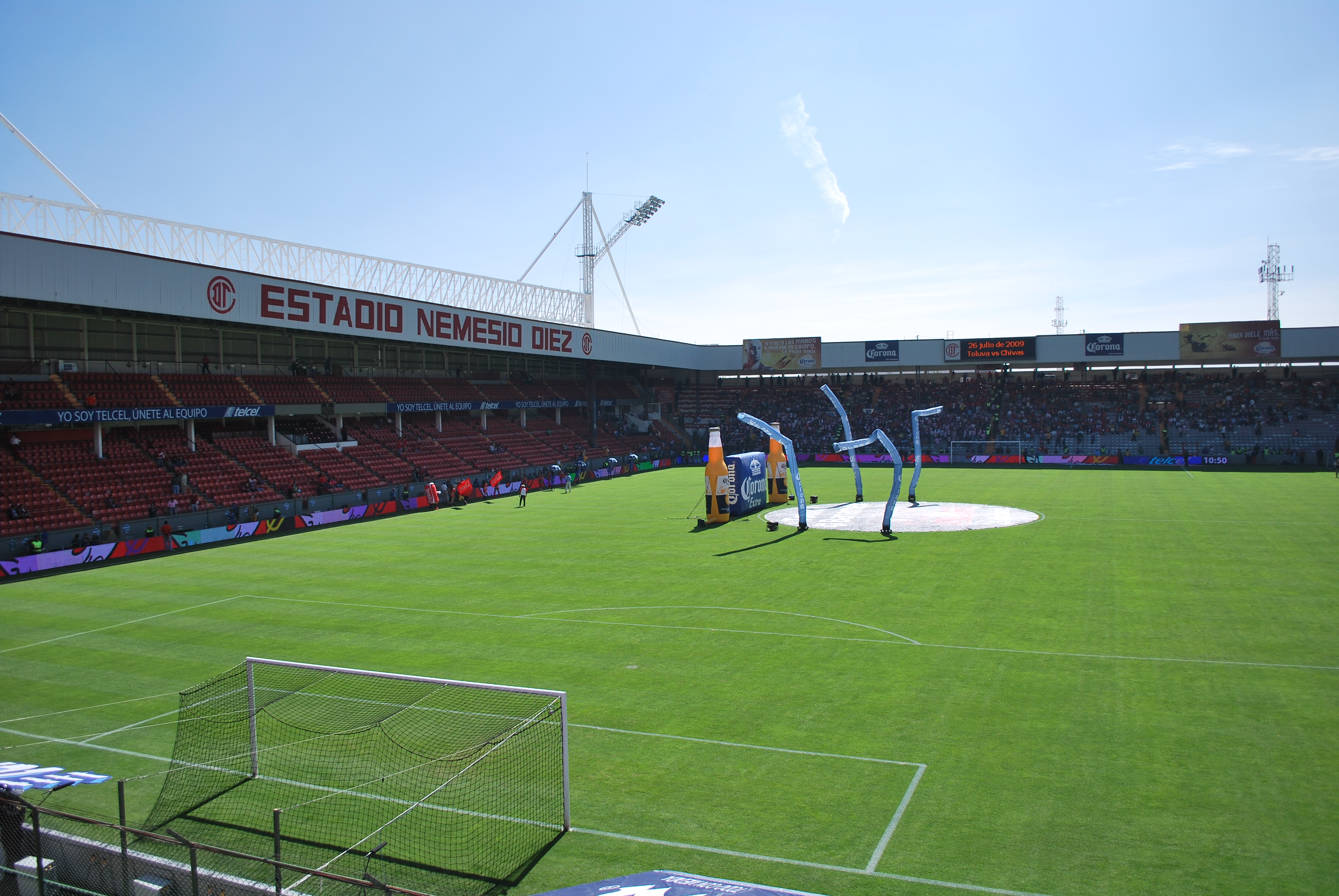
- View of Toluca's stadium (pictured in 2009)
- Event: 16th fixture of the Apertura 2003 tournament of the Liga MX
| Toluca | América |
| 6 | 0 |
- Date: 1 November 2003; 22 years ago
- Venue: Nemesio Diez Stadium, Toluca, Mexico
- Referee: Benito Armando Archundia (Mexico)

On 1 November 2003, a Liga MX match between Toluca FC and Club América was played at Nemesio Diez Stadium, Toluca's home ground. The match, part of the Apertura 2003 tournament, ended in a 6–0 victory for Toluca, one of América's heaviest defeats in league history. Entering the match, América had lost only once in eleven games and were considered favorites, while Toluca were adjusting to a recently appointed manager whose style of play had yet to be consolidated. Although not a formal derby, matches between the two clubs carried a competitive rivalry and the game was expected to be closely contested.

América's defensive organization deteriorated early, with the side conceding three yellow cards in quick succession before having a player sent off. Toluca scored twice in the first half before adding four more after the interval. Toluca's all-time leading scorer José Saturnino Cardozo scored a hat-trick, and the match featured a collective team goal widely regarded as one of the greatest ever scored in Liga MX. Outside the stadium there is a mural of the team goal and the match.

== Background ==
Toluca FC and Club América are two clubs that compete in Liga MX, Mexico's top football division. América, based in Mexico City, is the most successful club in Mexican football history and holds among the largest supporter base in the country. Toluca, based in the city of the same name in the State of Mexico, ranks among the league's most successful clubs, though with a considerably smaller following than América. Although not considered a formal derby, both clubs have developed a competitive rivalry since the 1990s. Across their previous meetings, Toluca's largest victory over América had been a 6–0 defeat in the 1975–76 Liga MX season, a margin that the 2003 match would equal, making Toluca the only club in Mexico to have beaten América by six goals on two occasions. Between 1998 and 2002, Toluca won four league titles, establishing one of the most dominant periods in Liga MX history.

Prior to the match, Toluca had accumulated 10 points in the league with victories over Veracruz and Tecos and a draw away against Monterrey. The club had recently appointed Ricardo Ferretti as head coach, replacing Alberto Jorge the previous month. Ferretti had made a positive start but had yet to establish a defined system of play and had drawn criticism for an unattractive style. América, by contrast, were in stronger form and challenging for the top positions in the standings, having recently defeated league ranking leaders Tigres UANL. América had won three consecutive matches and lost only one of their previous eleven, leading some pundits to consider them title contenders. The game was expected to be closely contested between both teams.

Ahead of the match, América midfielder Pavel Pardo and goalkeeper Adolfo Ríos were ruled out due to injury. América striker Cuauhtémoc Blanco was experiencing some muscle pain from his last games but was able to play the match. Toluca forward José Saturnino Cardozo, the club's all-time goalscorer, had been out of form in the matches preceding the game, going several fixtures without scoring.

== Match ==
=== First half ===
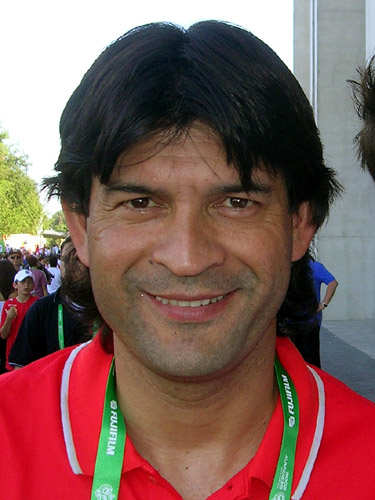
Toluca's forward José Saturnino Cardozo scored a hat-trick in the game

The fixture was the sixteenth match of the Apertura 2003 tournament, with Toluca hosting América at Nemesio Diez Stadium on 1 November 2003. The stadium fell short of full capacity, attributed to high ticket and resale prices. Toluca opened the scoring in the 11th minute through Uruguayan midfielder Vicente Sánchez, who converted after a series of rebounds in front of goal following an offensive initiated by Cardozo from the left wing.

Following the goal, América's organization visibly deteriorated, with the side conceding three yellow cards in quick succession before Colombian player Frankie Oviedo was shown a red card in the 16th minute. Playing with ten men, Toluca asserted more control of the midfield, with Mexican player Israel López creating more opportunities for Cardozo against goalkeeper Alberto Becerra.

In the 27th minute, Cardozo initiated an attacking move down the left wing, combining with Sánchez before directing the ball with his chest to set up Sánchez for a direct strike, which was saved by Becerra. Nearing the end of the first half, Blanco created América's first clear opportunity from a corner kick from Germán Villa, but was denied by Toluca goalkeeper Hernán Cristante. Despite América having stabilized Toluca's attacks, Jesús Mendoza pulled José Manuel Cruzalta's shirt inside the penalty area, and the referee awarded a penalty kick to Toluca. Cardozo converted from the spot in the 38th minute to make it 2–0 before half time.

=== Second half ===
Toluca began the second half unchanged, while América's coach Leo Beenhakker substituted Carlos Infante for Raúl Alberto Salinas, pushing Villa into a more offensive role and reinforcing the midfield to limit Toluca's movement. However, América were not able to gain control with one player down and Toluca took control of the match. In the 53rd minute, Toluca extended their lead to 3–0. López initiated the move down the right wing, finding Salvador Carmona, who carried the ball into the penalty area and drew Becerra before finishing from close range. After the third goal, Beenhakker substituted Mendoza with Sergio Blanco, and Cuauhtémoc Blanco for Sebastián Abreu. At the 68th minute, Toluca's player Rafael García scored over the defense line through a free kick, making it 4–0.

- Toluca's team goal scored by José Saturnino Cardozo (starting minute 1:42), published by TUDN

In the 75th minute, Toluca scored from a sweeping team move that originated deep in their own half near the left corner flag. Sánchez and Toluca player Hassan Viades won possession from América's José Antonio Castro and played the ball to Cardozo, who let it run past him to evade Álvaro Ortiz before advancing and chipping the ball over Ricardo Rojas's tackle. Cardozo then combined with Sinha and García in a multi-touch sequence, with Sinha flicking the ball back to Cardozo, who returned it to Sinha, who played it to García, whose cross from inside the penalty area found Cardozo to score. Cardozo had anticipated Becerra advancing to close down García, positioning himself at the second post to receive the cross unmarked. This goal is widely regarded as one of the best ones scored in Liga MX's history.

In the 78th minute, América suffered another squad reduction when Hugo Norberto Castillo was shown a second yellow card and subsequently dismissed for fouling López. In the 82nd minute, Christian Ramírez fouled López inside the penalty area, and the referee awarded Toluca a penalty. Cardozo converted in the 83rd minute to complete the scoring at 6–0 and sealing his hat-trick.

=== Details ===
1 November 2003
3:00 p.m.

| Toluca (Mexico) | 6–0 | (Mexico) América |
|---|---|---|
| Sánchez 11'; Cardozo 38' (pen.), 75', 83' (pen.); Carmona 53'; García 68' |

Nemesio Diez Stadium, Toluca, Mexico
Referee: Benito Armando Archundia

| Toluca | América |

| GK | 1 | (Argentina) Hernán Cristante |
| LB | 7 | (Mexico) Salvador Carmona (c) |
| CB | 6 | (Paraguay) Paulo Da Silva (yellow card) 7' |
| RB | 18 | (Mexico) José Manuel Cruzalta (yellow card) 31' (substituted off) 81' |
| CB | 4 | (Mexico) Emilio Hassan Viades (yellow card) 63' |
| CM | 5 | (Mexico) Israel López |
| RM | 23 | (Mexico) Erick Espinosa (substituted off) 81' |
| CM | 10 | (Mexico) Sinha |
| LM | 8 | (Mexico) Rafael García |
| CF | 11 | (Uruguay) Vicente Sánchez (substituted off) 89' |
| CF | 9 | (Paraguay) José Saturnino Cardozo |
Substitutes:
| CB | 19 | (Mexico) Sergio Ponce (substituted on) 81' |
| CM | 3 | (Argentina) Maximiliano Cuberas (substituted on) 81' |
| CM | 29 | (Mexico) Miguel Carreón (substituted on) 89' |
Manager:
(Brazil) Ricardo Ferretti

| GK | 12 | (Mexico) Alberto Becerra |
| RB | 3 | (Mexico) José Antonio Castro (yellow card) 14' |
| LB | 16 | (Chile) Ricardo Rojas |
| CB | 19 | (Mexico) Álvaro Ortiz |
| CB | 22 | (Mexico) Christian Ramírez |
| CM | 18 | (Mexico) Germán Villa (c) (yellow card) 16' |
| CM | 14 | (Mexico) Carlos Infante (substituted off) 46' |
| CM | 8 | (Colombia) Frankie Oviedo (red card) 16' |
| CF | 7 | (Mexico) Hugo Norberto Castillo (yellow card) 77' (yellow-red card) 78' |
| CF | 10 | (Mexico) Cuauhtémoc Blanco (yellow card) 19' (substituted off) 76' |
| CM | 11 | (Argentina) Jesús Mendoza (substituted off) 60' |
Substitutes:
| CB | 28 | (Mexico) Raúl Alberto Salinas (substituted on) 46' (yellow card) 71' |
| CF | 20 | (Uruguay) Sergio Blanco (substituted on) 60' |
| CF | 17 | (Uruguay) Sebastián Abreu (substituted on) 76' |
Manager:
(Netherlands) Leo Beenhakker

Assistant referees:
Freddy Sansores Carrillo (Mexico)
Santiago Rojas Castro (Mexico)
Roberto García Orozco (Mexico)

Overall statistics
| Statistic | Toluca | América |
|---|---|---|
| Goals scored | 6 | 0 |
| Total shots | 19 | 2 |
| Shots on target | 8 | 2 |
| Saves | 2 | 6 |
| Corner kicks | 5 | 4 |
| Fouls committed | 14 | 13 |
| Yellow cards | 3 | 6 |
| Red cards | 0 | 2 |

== Aftermath and legacy ==
Following the final whistle, Cardozo spoke with reporters, expressing pride in the performance and acknowledging América as a side that brought out the best in Toluca. Toluca president Rafael Lebrija Guiot also congratulated the squad on the victory. The press described the defeat as one of the worst "humiliations" in América's history. In their next fixture, América hosted Chivas de Guadalajara in the Súper Clásico derby, where they fell 1–2.

At the end of the Apertura 2003, Toluca finished tenth in the general standings and advanced through the repechaje (qualification round) to reach the liguilla (playoff tournament). Toluca reached the semi-finals before being eliminated by Tigres UANL 2–1 on aggregate. América did not make it to the playoffs. Across the season, Toluca won eight matches, drew three, and lost eight, scoring 33 goals and conceding 24. Cardozo finished as the club's leading scorer with 13 goals in the regular season and an additional five in the playoffs. Throughout his professional career, Cardozo scored 17 goals against América, including hat-tricks, making América one of the clubs he scored against the most in his career. Six years later, in the Apertura 2009 tournament, América defeated Toluca 7–2 at Estadio Azteca.

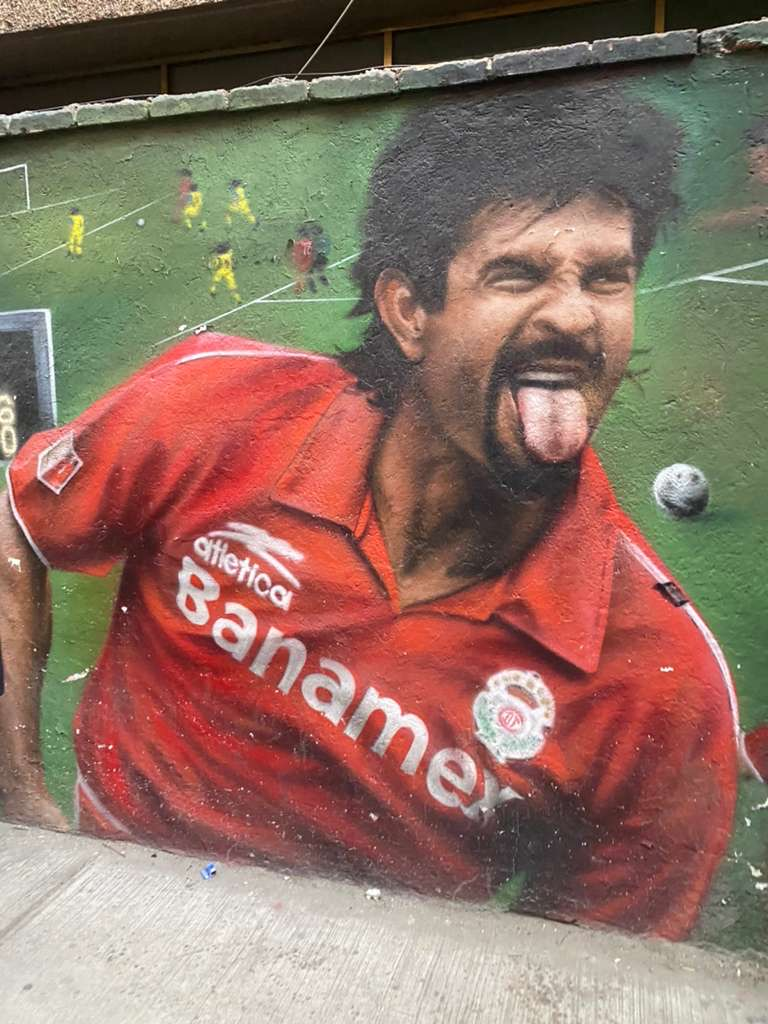
Mural of Cardozo and the team goal in the background

In 2009, the British newspaper The Guardian voted Toluca's team goal from Cardozo as the second-best team goal of all time, behind only Carlos Alberto's goal for Brazil in the 1970 FIFA World Cup final against Italy. They described Toluca's goal as "... almost too slick, as if some CGI manipulation [had] occurred." They noted Toluca's precise passing, the movement of its players, and their positional awareness throughout the play. In 2017, The Guardian published a detailed analysis of the goal, noting that what distinguished it was the incorporation of several techniques into a single continuous move: a dummy, a back-heel flick, a one-two pass, and a disguised pass in a progressive offensive movement.

A mural located at José María Morelos Street, across from Nemesio Diez Stadium, depicts the team goal sequence in the background with Cardozo celebrating in the foreground, alongside the final score of 6–0 commemorating Toluca's victory. The mural was created by urban artist Dovlez, who has produced several other murals for the club. In a 2023 interview, Dovlez stated that the mural took him and his team three days to complete, beginning with a digital sketch before painting it on the wall. He noted that Cardozo's likeness was the most challenging aspect of the process, as any minor alteration could affect the appearance of a figure widely recognized by football fans. The mural also features the live television narration quote of the play by sports broadcaster Raúl Pérez Reyes, titled El Poema de Gol (The Poem of a Goal).

In November 2024, Cardozo was interviewed on the pitch at Nemesio Diez Stadium by sports broadcaster Christian Martinoli, discussing the goal in detail from his perspective. This interview was done as part of a promotional video for Roshfrans, Toluca's main sponsor, ahead of a Toluca versus América match in the Apertura 2024 tournament. Martinoli, who is also a fan of Toluca, recorded a narrated recreation of the play.
