= Primera División de México Apertura 2008 Liguilla Final =

- Event: Primera División de México Apertura 2008 Liguilla
Cruz Azul	Toluca
(Mexico)	(Mexico)
2	2
- On aggregate

First leg
Cruz Azul	Toluca
0	2
- Date: 11 December 2008
- Venue: Estadio Azul, Mexico City
- Referee: Paúl Enrique Delgadillo (Mexico)
- Attendance: 33,000

Second leg
Toluca	Cruz Azul
0	2
- (a.e.t.)
- Date: 14 December 2008
- Venue: Nemesio Diez Stadium, Toluca
- Referee: Roberto García (Mexico)
- Attendance: 27,000

The Apertura 2008 Liguilla Final was a two-legged football match-up to determine the Apertura 2008 champions. The series was contested between Toluca and Cruz Azul, both of whom were playing in their first final against each other.

== Final rules ==
Like other match-ups in the knockout round, the teams will play two games, one at each team's home stadium. As the highest seeded team determined at the beginning of the Liguilla, Toluca was to have home-field advantage for the second leg. If the teams remained tied after 90 minutes of play during the 2nd leg, extra time will be used, followed by a penalty shootout if necessary.

== Final summary ==
=== First leg ===
The First Leg was played in front of a capacity crowd at Estadio Azul in Mexico City. Paulo da Silva opened up the scoreboard with a goal in the 14th minute followed by a superb free kick by Sergio Amaury Ponce at the 22nd minute. Cruz Azul could not find an answer in the 2nd half though they were playing better, Hernán Cristante of Toluca had a sensational game under the three posts. The final score left Toluca with a 2-goal advantage going into the next leg.

2008-12-11
20:00

Cruz Azul	0 – 2	Toluca
	(Report)	da Silva 14'; Ponce 21'

Estadio Azul, Mexico City
Referee: Paúl Enrique Delgadillo (Mexico)

Cruz Azul	Toluca

CRUZ AZUL:
GK	25	(Mexico) Yosgart Gutiérrez
DF	8	(Paraguay) Carlos Bonet
DF	14	(Mexico) Joaquín Beltrán
DF	13	(Mexico) Alejandro Castro		(substituted off) 72'
DF	21	(Mexico) Jaime Lozano
MF	6	(Mexico) Gerardo Torrado (c)
MF	7	(Paraguay) Cristian Riveros	(yellow card) 12'
MF	23	(Mexico) Edgar Lugo		(substituted off) 46'
MF	18	(Mexico) César Villaluz
FW	11	(Mexico) Miguel Sabah
FW	9	(Paraguay) Pablo Zeballos		(substituted off) 71'
Substitutes:
GK	1	(Mexico) Alfonso Blanco
DF	32	(Mexico) Emilio Hassan Viades		(substituted on) 72'
DF	16	(Mexico) Rogelio Chávez
MF	5	(Mexico) Gabino Velasco
FW	29	(Mexico) Martín Galván
FW	19	(Mexico) Alejandro Vela		(substituted on) 71'
FW	15	(Uruguay) Nicolás Vigneri		(substituted on) 46'
Manager:
(Mexico) Benjamín Galindo

TOLUCA:
GK	1	(Argentina) Hernán Cristante
DF	16	(Mexico) Sergio Amaury Ponce
DF	14	(Mexico) Edgar Dueñas
DF	3	(Paraguay) Paulo Da Silva (c)
DF	6	(Mexico) Manuel De La Torre
MF	55	(Mexico) Israel López
MF	5	(Argentina) Martín Romagnoli
MF	75	(Mexico) Néstor Calderón		(substituted off) 67'
MF	10	(Mexico) Zinha
FW	11	(Mexico) Carlos Esquivel
FW	9	(Chile) Héctor Mancilla	(yellow card) 60'	(substituted off) 80'
Substitutes:
GK	12	(Mexico) César Lozano
DF	24	(Mexico) José Manuel Cruzalta
DF	4	(Mexico) Miguel Almazán
DF	29	(Mexico) Mario Méndez
MF	18	(Mexico) Carlos Adrián Morales
MF	21	(Mexico) Diego De La Torre		(substituted on) 67'
FW	59	(Mexico) Raúl Nava		(substituted on) 80'
Manager:
(Mexico) José Manuel De la Torre

Assistant referees:
(Mexico) Alberto Morín Méndez
(Mexico) Carlos Ayala Cuéllar
Fourth official:
(Mexico) José Alfredo Peñaloza Soto

=== Second leg ===
2008-12-14
12:00

Toluca	0 – 2 (a.e.t.)	Cruz Azul
	(Report)	Vela 49'; Domínguez 77'
Penalties
López (penalty scored); Zinha (penalty scored); D. De la Torre (penalty scored); Esquivel (penalty scored); Mancilla (penalty scored); Dueñas (penalty scored); Almazán (penalty scored)	7 – 6	(penalty scored) Lozano; (penalty scored) Sabah; (penalty scored) Torrado; (penalty scored) Beltrán; (penalty scored) Zeballos; (penalty scored) Lugo; (penalty missed) Vela

Estadio Nemesio Díez, Toluca, Mexico State
Referee: Roberto García (Mexico)

Toluca	Cruz Azul

TOLUCA:
GK	1	(Argentina) Hernán Cristante
DF	16	(Mexico) Sergio Amaury Ponce	(yellow card) 102'	(substituted off) 103'
DF	14	(Mexico) Edgar Dueñas
DF	3	(Paraguay) Paulo Da Silva (c)
DF	6	(Mexico) Manuel De La Torre		(substituted off) 70'
MF	55	(Mexico) Israel López
MF	5	(Argentina) Martín Romagnoli	(yellow card) 47'
MF	75	(Mexico) Néstor Calderón		(substituted off) 54'
MF	10	(Mexico) Zinha
FW	11	(Mexico) Carlos Esquivel
FW	9	(Chile) Héctor Mancilla
Substitutes:
GK	12	(Mexico) César Lozano
DF	24	(Mexico) José Manuel Cruzalta		(substituted on) 54'
DF	4	(Mexico) Miguel Almazán		(substituted on) 70'
DF	29	(Mexico) Mario Méndez
MF	18	(Mexico) Carlos Adrián Morales
MF	21	(Mexico) Diego De La Torre		(substituted on) 103'
FW	59	(Mexico) Raúl Nava
Manager:
(Mexico) José Manuel De la Torre

CRUZ AZUL:
GK	25	(Mexico) Yosgart Gutiérrez
DF	8	(Paraguay) Carlos Bonet		(substituted off) 65'
DF	14	(Mexico) Joaquín Beltrán	(yellow card) 63'
DF	4	(Mexico) Julio César Domínguez
DF	16	(Mexico) Rogelio Chávez	(yellow card) 32'	(substituted off) 56'
MF	6	(Mexico) Gerardo Torrado (c)	(yellow card) 18'
MF	7	(Paraguay) Cristian Riveros
MF	19	(Mexico) Alejandro Vela
MF	18	(Mexico) César Villaluz
FW	11	(Mexico) Miguel Sabah	(yellow card) 100'
FW	15	(Uruguay) Nicolás Vigneri		(substituted off) 46'
Substitutes:
GK	1	(Mexico) Alfonso Blanco
DF	3	(Mexico) Joel Huiqui
DF	32	(Mexico) Emilio Hassan Viades	(red card) 115'
DF	21	(Mexico) Jaime Lozano	(yellow card) 59'	(substituted on) 56'
MF	5	(Mexico) Gabino Velasco
MF	23	(Mexico) Edgar Lugo	(yellow card) 72'	(substituted on) 65'
FW	9	(Paraguay) Pablo Zeballos		(substituted on) 46'
Manager:
(Mexico) Benjamín Galindo

Assistant referees:
(Mexico) Arturo Velázquez Ramírez
(Mexico) Antonio López Chávez
Fourth official:
(Mexico) Francisco Chacón Gutiérrez
