= Primera División de México Apertura 2003 =

Primera División de México
- Season: 2003−04
- Champions: Pachuca (3rd title)
- Champions' Cup: Pachuca
- Copa Libertadores: América; Santos Laguna
- Top goalscorer: Luis Gabriel Rey (15 goals)

Primera División de México (Mexican First Division) Apertura 2003 is a Mexican football tournament - one of two short tournaments that take up the entire year to determine the champion(s) of Mexican football. It began on Saturday 2 August 2003, and ran until 22 November, when the regular season ended. Irapuato was promoted to the Primera División de México to play this tournament, and Cuernavaca was to be relegated to the Primera División A. The Cuernavaca did not get to play in Primera A, though, as the team was disbanded by FMF. On 20 December, Pachuca defeated Tigres UANL and became champions for the third time.

== Clubs ==
- Necaxa moved from Mexico City to Aguascalientes.
Location of the Primera División Apertura 2003 teams

Team	City	Stadium
América	Mexico City	Azteca
Atlante	Ciudad Nezahualcóyotl, State of Mexico	Neza 86
Atlas	Guadalajara, Jalisco	Jalisco
Chiapas	Tuxtla Gutiérrez, Chiapas	Víctor Manuel Reyna
Cruz Azul	Mexico City	Azul
Guadalajara	Guadalajara, Jalisco	Jalisco
Irapuato	Irapuato, Guanajuato	Sergio León Chávez
Morelia	Morelia, Michoacán	Morelos
Monterrey	Monterrey, Nuevo León	Tecnológico
Necaxa	Aguascalientes, Aguascalientes	Victoria
Pachuca	Pachuca, Hidalgo	Hidalgo
Puebla	Puebla, Puebla	Cuauhtémoc
Querétaro	Querétaro, Querétaro	Corregidora
San Luis	San Luis Potosí, S.L.P.	Alfonso Lastras
Santos Laguna	Torreón, Coahuila	Corona
Toluca	Toluca, State of Mexico	Nemesio Díez
UAG	Zapopan, Jalisco	Tres de Marzo
UANL	San Nicolás de los Garza, Nuevo León	Universitario
UNAM	Mexico City	Olímpico Universitario
Veracruz	Veracruz, Veracruz	Luis "Pirata" Fuente

== Regular phase ==
Group 1
Pos	Team	Pld	W	D	L	GF	GA	GD	Pts	Qualification
1	Pachuca	19	10	6	3	28	19	+9	36	Directly qualified to the Liguilla (Playoffs)
2	Toluca	19	8	3	8	33	24	+9	27	Qualified for the Repechage
3	Monterrey	19	5	7	7	29	29	0	22	
4	Puebla	19	5	5	9	23	30	−7	20	
5	Atlas	19	5	4	10	29	32	−3	19	

Source: MedioTiempo

Group 2
Pos	Team	Pld	W	D	L	GF	GA	GD	Pts	Qualification
1	UNAM	19	11	5	3	34	23	+11	38	Directly qualified to the Liguilla (Playoffs)
2	Santos Laguna	19	8	7	4	41	29	+12	31	Directly qualified to the Liguilla (Playoffs)
3	UAG	19	9	4	6	31	29	+2	31	Qualified for the Repechage
4	América	19	8	4	7	34	26	+8	28	
5	Querétaro	19	1	4	14	16	44	−28	7	

Source: MedioTiempo

Group 3
Pos	Team	Pld	W	D	L	GF	GA	GD	Pts	Qualification
1	UANL	19	11	5	3	38	20	+18	38	Directly qualified to the Liguilla (Playoffs)
2	Cruz Azul	19	7	6	6	30	30	0	27	Qualified for the Repechage
3	Morelia	19	7	4	8	25	29	−4	25	
4	Chiapas	19	5	6	8	21	34	−13	21	
5	San Luis	19	2	5	12	20	39	−19	11	

Source: MedioTiempo

Group 4
Pos	Team	Pld	W	D	L	GF	GA	GD	Pts	Qualification
1	Atlante	19	8	7	4	32	21	+11	31	Directly qualified to the Liguilla (Playoffs)
2	Necaxa	19	7	9	3	23	18	+5	30	Directly qualified to the Liguilla (Playoffs)
3	Guadalajara	19	9	2	8	30	28	+2	29	Qualified for the Repechage
4	Veracruz	19	8	3	8	34	38	−4	27	
5	Irapuato	19	6	4	9	23	32	−9	22	

Source: MedioTiempo

== League table ==
Pos	Team	Pld	W	D	L	GF	GA	GD	Pts	Qualification
1	UANL	19	11	5	3	38	20	+18	38	Directly qualified to the Liguilla (Playoffs)
2	UNAM	19	11	5	3	34	23	+11	38	Directly qualified to the Liguilla (Playoffs)
3	Pachuca	19	10	6	3	28	19	+9	36	Directly qualified to the Liguilla (Playoffs)
4	Santos Laguna	19	8	7	4	41	29	+12	31	Directly qualified to the Liguilla (Playoffs)
5	Atlante	19	8	7	4	32	21	+11	31	Directly qualified to the Liguilla (Playoffs)
6	UAG	19	9	4	6	31	29	+2	31	Qualified for the Repechage
7	Necaxa	19	7	9	3	23	18	+5	30	Directly qualified to the Liguilla (Playoffs)
8	Guadalajara	19	9	2	8	30	28	+2	29	Qualified for the Repechage
9	América	19	8	4	7	34	26	+8	28	
10	Toluca	19	8	3	8	33	24	+9	27	Qualified for the Repechage
11	Cruz Azul	19	7	6	6	30	30	0	27	Qualified for the Repechage
12	Veracruz	19	8	3	8	34	38	−4	27	
13	Morelia	19	7	4	8	25	29	−4	25	
14	Monterrey	19	5	7	7	29	29	0	22	
15	Irapuato	19	6	4	9	23	32	−9	22	
16	Chiapas	19	5	6	8	21	34	−13	21	
17	Puebla	19	5	5	9	23	30	−7	20	
18	Atlas	19	5	4	10	29	32	−3	19	
19	San Luis	19	2	5	12	20	39	−19	11	
20	Querétaro	19	1	4	14	16	44	−28	7	

Source: MedioTiempo

== Results ==
Home \ Away	AME	ATE	ATS	CHI	CAZ	GDL	IRA	MTY	MOR	NEC	PAC	PUE	QRO	SNL	SAN	TOL	UAG	UNL	UNM	VER
América	—	–	3–0	5–0	1–1	1–2	1–0	–	1–0	–	–	4–1	–	–	0–0	–	0–1	2–1	–	–
Atlante	0–0	—	–	3–0	3–3	2–2	0–1	–	2–2	–	–	3–0	–	2–0	–	–	1–0	2–2	–	–
Atlas	–	2–1	—	–	–	–	6–1	2–3	–	1–1	3–1	–	0–1	4–1	–	2–0	–	–	0–1	2–2
Chiapas	–	–	1–1	—	–	–	2–2	3–2	–	1–1	0–2	–	0–0	–	1–1	0–1	–	–	2–5	1–0
Cruz Azul	–	–	4–1	1–3	—	2–1	–	1–0	0–2	–	–	1–0	–	–	0–2	–	–	1–1	–	2–3
Guadalajara	–	–	1–0	0–1	–	—	–	0–2	0–1	2–3	–	–	–	–	2–1	–	–	2–3	2–0	3–1
Irapuato	–	–	–	–	1–2	2–3	—	–	1–1	1–3	0–1	3–1	2–1	–	–	2–1	–	2–0	0–1	–
Monterrey	2–2	1–0	–	–	–	–	2–2	—	–	0–0	2–2	–	3–1	3–2	–	0–0	–	–	0–1	1–1
Morelia	–	–	2–1	1–1	–	–	–	1–0	—	3–3	–	–	3–2	–	2–4	1–2	–	–	0–3	2–0
Necaxa	1–0	2–0	–	–	0–0	–	–	–	–	—	1–1	1–0	1–0	1–1	–	1–0	0–0	–	–	–
Pachuca	2–1	0–0	–	–	4–1	2–0	–	–	2–1	–	—	0–2	–	2–0	–	–	2–1	1–1	–	–
Puebla	–	–	1–1	4–1	–	1–1	–	1–0	4–2	–	–	—	–	–	1–1	–	–	0–1	1–1	3–4
Querétaro	1–3	0–2	–	–	3–3	1–2	–	–	–	–	0–0	0–2	—	4–4	–	–	0–3	1–7	–	–
San Luis	1–5	–	–	1–2	0–0	1–2	0–0	–	0–1	–	–	4–0	–	—	3–0	–	1–3	0–2	–	–
Santos Laguna	–	2–3	3–2	–	–	–	5–0	5–5	–	1–1	1–2	–	2–1	–	—	3–2	–	–	3–0	3–0
Toluca	6–0	3–4	–	–	1–2	2–1	–	–	–	–	1–1	0–0	2–0	5–0	–	—	2–1	–	–	–
UAG	–	–	1–0	3–2	2–5	2–4	1–3	2–1	1–0	–	–	2–1	–	–	3–3	–	—	2–1	–	–
UANL	–	–	4–1	1–0	–	–	–	3–2	2–0	2–1	–	–	–	–	1–1	1–0	–	—	1–1	4–1
UNAM	4–3	1–1	–	–	2–1	–	–	–	–	2–0	1–2	–	2–0	0–0	–	3–0	2–2	–	—	-
Veracruz	3–2	0–3	–	–	–	–	-	–	–	3–2	3–1	–	3–0	3–1	–	2–3	1–1	–	3–4	—

Updated to match(es) played on 22 November 2003. Source: RSSSF
Legend: Blue = home team win; Yellow = draw; Red = away team win.

== Top goalscorers ==
Players sorted first by goals scored, then by last name. Only regular season goals listed.

Rank	Player	Club	Goals
1	(Colombia) Luis Gabriel Rey	Atlante	15
2	(Paraguay) José Cardozo	Toluca	13
3	(Uruguay) Carlos María Morales	Atlas	12
3	(Chile) Reinaldo Navia	Morelia	12
5	(Brazil) Alex Fernandes	Monterrey	11
5	(Mexico) Emilio Mora	Veracruz	11
6	(Mexico) Jared Borgetti	Santos Laguna	10
6	(Brazil) Eliomar Marcón	UAG	10
6	(Argentina) Alfredo Moreno	Necaxa	10
9	(Mexico) Cuauhtémoc Blanco	América	9
9	(Argentina) Walter Gaitán	UANL	9
9	(Chile) Luis Ignacio Quinteros	Puebla	9
9	(Argentina) Andrés Silvera	UANL	9

Source: MedioTiempo

== Final phase (Liguilla) ==
=== Repechage ===
November 26, 2003
15:00

Toluca	4–0	Guadalajara
Cardozo 55', 65'; Carmona 82'; Sánchez 90'	Report

Estadio Nemesio Díez, Toluca
Referee: Marco Antonio Rodríguez (Mexico City)
November 29, 2003
19:00

Guadalajara	4–2	Toluca
Morales 11' (pen.); Parra 62'; Medina 89'; Bravo 90+2'	Report	Cardozo 42'; Sánchez 61'

Estadio Jalisco, Guadalajara
Referee: Manuel Ernesto Glower (Mexico City)

Toluca won 6–4 on aggregate.

November 26, 2003
21:00

Cruz Azul	1–0	UAG
Galindo 65'	Report

Estadio Azul, Mexico City
Referee: Germán Arredondo Ramírez (Guanajuato)
November 29, 2003
17:00

UAG	1–3	Cruz Azul
Davino 44'	Report	Cata 20'; C. Delgado 80'; Marín 90+2'

Estadio Tres de Marzo, Zapopan
Referee: Gilberto Alcalá Pineda (Mexico City)

Cruz Azul won 4–1 on aggregate.

=== Bracket ===
Quarterfinals
1	UANL (s)	1	1	2
11	Cruz Azul	0	2	2
2	UNAM	2	0	2
10	Toluca	2	2	4
3	Pachuca	3	1	4
7	Necaxa	1	2	3
4	Santos Laguna	1	2	3
5	Atlante	3	2	5

Semifinals
1	UANL	0	2	2
10	Toluca	1	0	1
3	Pachuca	0	2	2
5	Atlante	0	1	1

Finals
1	UANL	1	1	2
3	Pachuca	3	0	3

=== Quarterfinals ===
December 3, 2003
21:00

Cruz Azul	0–1	UANL
	Report	Gaitán 27'

Estadio Azul, Mexico City
Referee: Paul Delgadillo (Jalisco)
December 6, 2003
19:00

UANL	1–2	Cruz Azul
Silvera 6'	Report	M. Delgado 10'; C. Delgado 17'

Estadio Universitario, San Nicolás de los Garza
Referee: Mauricio Morales (Mexico City)

2–2 on aggregate. UANL advanced for being the higher seeded team.

December 3, 2003
15:00

Toluca	2–2	UNAM
Cuberas 26'; Cardozo 45' (pen.)	Report	Botero 5'; Verón 60'

Estadio Nemesio Díez, Toluca
Referee: José Abramo Lira (Nuevo León)
December 6, 2003
12:00

UNAM	0–2	Toluca
	Report	Carmona 31'; López 53'

Estadio Olímpico Universitario, Mexico City
Referee: Marco Antonio Rodríguez (Mexico City)

Toluca won 4–2 on aggregate.

December 4, 2003
20:00

Necaxa	1–3	Pachuca
Sosa 51'	Report	Vidrio 48'; Santana 57'; Ledesma 83'

Estadio Victoria, Aguascalientes
Referee: Jorge Eduardo Gasso (Mexico City)
December 7, 2003
12:00

Pachuca	1–2	Necaxa
Claudinho 65'	Report	Luna 9', 44'

Estadio Hidalgo, Pachuca
Referee: Manuel Ernesto Glower (Mexico City)

Pachuca won 4–3 on aggregate.

December 4, 2003
15:00

Atlante	3–1	Santos Laguna
S. González 25', 49', 66' (pen.)	Report	Ruiz 30'

Estadio Neza 86, Ciudad Nezahualcóyotl
Referee: Hugo León Guajardo (Mexico City)
December 7, 2003
16:00

Santos Laguna	2–2	Atlante
Vuoso 14'; Borgetti 69'	Report	Baños 1'; Hernández 75'

Estadio Corona, Torreón
Referee: Gilberto Alcalá Pineda (Mexico City)

Atlante won 5–3 on aggregate.

=== Semifinals ===
December 10, 2003
15:00

Toluca	1–0	UANL
Cardozo 63'	Report

Estadio Nemesio Díez, Toluca
Referee: Gilberto Alcalá Pineda (Mexico City)
December 13, 2003
19:00

UANL	2–0	Toluca
Rergis 32'; Kléber 55'	Report

Estadio Universitario, San Nicolás de los Garza
Referee: Jorge Eduardo Gasso (Mexico City)

UANL won 2–1 on aggregate.

December 11, 2003
15:00

Atlante	0–0	Pachuca
	Report

Estadio Neza 86, Ciudad Nezahualcóyotl
Referee: José Abramo Lira (Nuevo León)
December 14, 2003
19:00

Pachuca	2–1	Atlante
Claudinho 2'; Caballero 70'	Report	S. González 74'

Estadio Hidalgo, Pachuca
Referee: Marco Antonio Rodríguez (Mexico City)

Pachuca won 2–1 on aggregate.

=== Finals ===
December 17, 2003
20:00

Pachuca	3–1	UANL
Sánchez 23' (o.g.); Bautista 77'; Gabriel 86' (pen.)	Report	Soares 59'

Estadio Hidalgo, Pachuca
Referee: Gilberto Alcalá Pineda (Mexico City)

First leg

Pachuca:
GK	1	(Colombia) Miguel Calero
DF	2	(Mexico) Alberto Rodríguez
DF	5	(Mexico) Francisco Gabriel de Anda
DF	4	(Mexico) Joel Huiqui
DF	99	(Mexico) Manuel Vidrio
DF	7	(Mexico) Octavio Valdez
MF	29	(Mexico) Jaime Correa
MF	8	(Mexico) Gabriel Caballero		(substituted off) 63'
MF	15	(Colombia) Andrés Chitiva
FW	18	(Mexico) Sergio Santana		(substituted off) 69'
FW	11	(Brazil) Claudinho		(substituted off) 60'
Substitutions:
GK	20	(Mexico) Melitón Hernández
DF	19	(Mexico) Marco Sánchez
MF	33	(Mexico) Braulio Godínez
MF	10	(Mexico) Marco Garcés
MF	19	(Brazil) Marinho Ledesma	(yellow card) 68'	(substituted on) 63'
MF	58	(Mexico) Adolfo Bautista		(substituted on) 69'
FW	9	(Uruguay) Jorge Alvez		(substituted on) 60'
Manager:
(Mexico) Víctor Manuel Vucetich

UANL:
GK	1	(Argentina) Gustavo Campagnuolo
DF	20	(Mexico) Hugo Sánchez
DF	4	(Mexico) David Oteo
DF	6	(Mexico) Omar Briceño
DF	15	(Mexico) Mario Ruiz
MF	5	(Mexico) Eduardo Rergis		(substituted off) 71'
MF	13	(Mexico) Antonio Sancho	(yellow card) 29'
MF	23	(Mexico) Javier Saavedra
MF	8	(Brazil) Irênio
FW	11	(Brazil) Kléber Pereira		(substituted off) 71'
FW	22	(Argentina) Andrés Silvera
Substitutions:
GK	1	(Mexico) Miguel Fuentes
DF	3	(Mexico) Sindey Balderas
MF	19	(Mexico) Juan Montano
MF	21	(Mexico) Marco Ruiz	(substituted on) 71'
MF	38	(Mexico) Jesús Palacios
FW	9	(Mexico) Jesús Olalde		(substituted on) 71'
FW	18	(Mexico) Aldo de Nigris
Manager:
(Argentina) Nery Pumpido

December 20, 2003
19:00

UANL	1–0	Pachuca
Silvera 90'	Report

Estadio Universitario, San Nicolás de los Garza
Referee: Marco Antonio Rodríguez (Mexico City)

Pachuca won 3–2 on aggregate.

Champions

3rd title
