= 2003 CONCACAF Champions' Cup =

38th edition of premier club football tournament organized by CONCACAF

Tournament details
- Dates: March 6 – October 8
- Teams: 16 (from 9 associations)

Final positions
- Champions: (Mexico) Toluca (2nd title)
- Runners-up: (Mexico) Morelia

Tournament statistics
- Matches played: 30
- Goals scored: 106 (3.53 per match)
- Top scorer(s): (Chile) Reinaldo Navia (5 goals)

The 2003 CONCACAF Champions' Cup was the 38th edition of the annual international club football competition held in the CONCACAF region (North America, Central America and the Caribbean), the CONCACAF Champions' Cup. It was won by Club Toluca after a 5–4 aggregate win over countryfellow club Morelia in the final. The tournament was held between March 6 and October 8. The 16-team format was scrapped for an eight-team format in 2004.

== Qualified teams ==
=== North American zone ===
(Mexico) Club Toluca – 2002 Apertura champion
(Mexico) Morelia – 2002 Apertura runner-up
(Mexico) Club América – 2002 Verano champion
(Mexico) Club Necaxa – 2002 Verano runner-up
(United States) Los Angeles Galaxy – 2002 MLS Cup champion and 2002 MLS Supporters Shield winner
(United States) New England Revolution – 2002 MLS Cup runner-up
(United States) San Jose Earthquakes – 2002 MLS Supporters Shield runner-up
(United States) Columbus Crew – 2002 U.S. Open Cup winner

=== Central American zone ===
(Costa Rica) Alajuelense – 2002 UNCAF Interclub Cup winner
(Panama) Árabe Unido – 2002 UNCAF Interclub Cup runner-up
(Honduras) Motagua – 2002 UNCAF Interclub Cup third place
(Guatemala) Comunicaciones – 2002 UNCAF Interclub Cup fourth place
(Guatemala) Municipal – 2002 UNCAF Interclub Cup first stage runner-up
(El Salvador) FAS – 2002 UNCAF Interclub Cup first stage runner-up

=== Caribbean zone ===
(Trinidad and Tobago) W Connection – 2002 CFU Club Championship finalist
(Jamaica) Arnett Gardens – 2002 CFU Club Championship finalist

== Bracket ==
First round
(Honduras) | Motagua | 2 | 0 | 2
(United States) | Los Angeles Galaxy | 2 | 1 | 3
(Jamaica) | Arnett Gardens | 0 | 0 | 0
(Mexico) | Necaxa | 0 | 1 | 1
(Guatemala) | Comunicaciones | 1 | 0 | 1
(Mexico) | Morelia | 0 | 4 | 4
(Panama) | Árabe Unido | 2 | 0 | 2
(United States) | Columbus Crew | 1 | 3 | 4
(Guatemala) | Municipal | 4 | 1 | 5
(United States) | San Jose Earthquakes | 2 | 2 | 4
(Mexico) | Club Toluca | 3 | 3 | 6
(Trinidad and Tobago) | W Connection | 3 | 2 | 5
(El Salvador) | FAS | 3 | 0 | 3
(Mexico) | Club América | 1 | 3 | 4
(Costa Rica) | Alajuelense | 4 | 1 | 5
(United States) | NE Revolution | 0 | 3 | 3

Quarterfinals
(United States) | Los Angeles Galaxy | 1 | 1 | 2
(Mexico) | Necaxa | 4 | 2 | 6
(Mexico) | Morelia | 6 | 0 | 6
(United States) | Columbus Crew | 0 | 2 | 2
(Guatemala) | Municipal | 1 | 1 | 2
(Mexico) | Club Toluca | 2 | 2 | 4
(Mexico) | Club América | 4 | 1 | 5
(Costa Rica) | Alajuelense | 0 | 3 | 3

Semifinals
(Mexico) | Necaxa | 0 | 0 | 0
(Mexico) | Morelia | 0 | 6 | 6
(Mexico) | Club Toluca (ASDET) | 1 | 4 | 5
(Mexico) | Club América | 4 | 0 | 4

Final
(Mexico) | Morelia | 3 | 1 | 4
(Mexico) | Club Toluca | 3 | 2 | 5

== Round of 16 ==
March 4, 2003

| FAS (El Salvador) | 3–1 | (Mexico) Club America |
|---|---|---|
| Jorge Rodriguez; Alejandro Bentos; Gilberto Murgas | | Goal |

Estadio Cuscatlán, San Salvador, El Salvador
March 26, 2003

| Club America (Mexico) | 3–0 | (El Salvador) FAS |

Cotton Bowl, Dallas, United States

América win 4–3 on aggregate

March 5, 2003

| Arnett Gardens (Jamaica) | 0–0 | (Mexico) Club Necaxa |

Independence Park, Kingston, Jamaica
March 19, 2003

| Club Necaxa (Mexico) | 1–0 | (Jamaica) Arnett Gardens |

Estadio Municipal de Aguascalientes, Aguascalientes, Mexico

Necaxa win 4–3 on aggregate

March 12, 2003

| Toluca (Mexico) | 3–2 | (Trinidad and Tobago) W Connection |
|---|---|---|
| Sánchez 65' 83'; García 77' | | 18' Viana; 38' Davis |

Estadio Nemesio Díez, Toluca, Mexico
April 2, 2003

| W Connection (Trinidad and Tobago) | 3–3 | (Mexico) Toluca |
|---|---|---|
| Jean 47'; Spann 69' (pen.); Isaac 73' | | 15' 67' Franco; 62' Sinha |

Manny Ramjohn Stadium, Marabella, Trinidad and Tobago

Deportivo Toluca win 6–5 on aggregate

March 12, 2003

| C.S.D. Comunicaciones (Guatemala) | 1–0 | (Mexico) Monarcas Morelia |

Estadio Doroteo Guamuch Flores, Guatemala City, Guatemala
March 26, 2003

| Monarcas Morelia (Mexico) | 4–0 | (Guatemala) C.S.D. Comunicaciones |

Estadio Morelos, Morelia, Mexico

Morelia win 4–1 on aggregate

March 16, 2003

| Municipal (Guatemala) | 4–2 | (United States) San Jose Earthquakes |
|---|---|---|
| Romero 28' 37'; Figueroa 39'; Ponciano 55' (pen.) | | 64' 71' Lagos |

Estadio El Trébol, Guatemala City, Guatemala
March 26, 2003

| San Jose Earthquakes (United States) | 2–1 | (Guatemala) Municipal |
|---|---|---|
| Donovan 19'; Ching 35' | | 76' Plata |

Spartan Stadium, San Jose, United States
Attendance: 4,594

Municipal win 5–4 on aggregate

March 16, 2003

| C.D. Árabe Unido (Panama) | 2–1 | (United States) Columbus Crew |
|---|---|---|
| 7'; 65' | Report | Martino 63' |

Estadio Rommel Fernández, Panama City, Panama
Attendance: 3,500
March 23, 2003

| Columbus Crew (United States) | 3–0 | (Panama) C.D. Árabe Unido |
|---|---|---|
| Buddle 42', 59'; Martino 70' | Report |

Historic Crew Stadium, Columbus, United States
Attendance: 6,443

Columbus win 4–2 on aggregate

March 16, 2003

| C.D. Motagua (Honduras) | 2–2 | (United States) Los Angeles Galaxy |

Estadio Tiburcio Carías Andino, Tegucigalpa, Honduras
March 23, 2003

| Los Angeles Galaxy (United States) | 1–0 | (Honduras) C.D. Motagua |
|---|---|---|
| | Report |

Titan Stadium, Fullerton, United States
Attendance: 5,307

LA Galaxy win 3–2 on aggregate

March 23, 2003

| (United States) NE Revolution | 0–4 | Alajuelense (Costa Rica) |
|---|---|---|
| | | Erick Scott; Alejandro Alpizar; Rolando Fonseca |

Estadio Alejandro Morera Soto, Alajuela, Costa Rica
March 26, 2003

| (Costa Rica) Alajuelense | 1–3 | NE Revolution (United States) |
|---|---|---|
| Rolando Fonseca 65' (pen.) | Match Report | Taylor Twellman 18' (pen.); Wolde Harris 53'; Steve Ralston 55'; Shalrie Joseph (red card) 63'; Daniel Hernandez (red card) 63' |

Estadio Alejandro Morera Soto, Alajuela, Costa Rica
Referee: Rodolfo Sibrian

Alajuelense win 5–3 on aggregate

== Quarterfinals ==
April 9, 2003

| Municipal (Guatemala) | 1–2 | (Mexico) Toluca |
|---|---|---|
| Acevedo 41' | | 9' Cardozo; 85' Almazán |

Estadio El Trébol, Guatemala City, Guatemala
April 16, 2003

| Toluca (Mexico) | 2–1 | (Guatemala) Municipal |
|---|---|---|
| Ruiz 25'; Sánchez 44' | | 8' Romero |

Estadio Nemesio Díez, Toluca, Mexico

Deportivo Toluca win 4–2 on aggregate

April 9, 2003

| Morelia (Mexico) | 6–0 | (United States) Columbus Crew |
|---|---|---|
| Palacios 39'; Íñiguez 42' 70'; Bautista 49' 55'; Navia 68' | Report |

Estadio Morelos, Morelia, Mexico
Attendance: 10,000
April 16, 2003

| Columbus Crew (United States) | 2–0 | (Mexico) Morelia |
|---|---|---|
| Buddle 15'; Cunningham 29' (pen.) | Report |

Columbus Crew Stadium, Columbus, United States
Attendance: 3,358

Morelia win 6–2 on aggregate

April 9, 2003

| LA Galaxy (United States) | 1–4 | (Mexico) Necaxa |
|---|---|---|
| Pineda 36' | Report | 27' 51' Franco; 81' Zague; 87' Larrosa |

Titan Stadium, Fullerton, United States
Attendance: 3,814
April 16, 2003

| Necaxa (Mexico) | 2–1 | (United States) LA Galaxy |
|---|---|---|
| Espinoza 43' 84' | | 32' Albright |

Estadio Municipal de Aguascalientes, Aguascalientes City, Mexico

Necaxa win 6–2 on aggregate

April 16, 2003

| América (Mexico) | 4–0 | (Costa Rica) Alajuelense |
|---|---|---|
| Castillo 50'; Lipatín 72' 84'; Blanco 88' (pen.) |

Estadio Azteca, Mexico City, Mexico
April 23, 2003

| Alajuelense (Costa Rica) | 3–1 | (Mexico) América |
|---|---|---|
| Chinchilla 16'; Scott 21'; López 73' | | 10' Fernández |

Estadio Alejandro Morera Soto, Alajuela, Costa Rica

América win 5–3 on aggregate

== Semifinals ==
First Leg

April 30, 2003
1st leg

| Toluca (Mexico) | 1–4 | (Mexico) América |
|---|---|---|
| González 13' | | Lipatin 35', 63'; Mendoza 56'; Blanco 83' (pen.) |

Estadio Nemesio Díez
Toluca, Mexico
April 30, 2003
1st leg

| Necaxa (Mexico) | 0–0 | (Mexico) Morelia |

Estadio Azteca
Mexico City, Mexico

Second Leg

May 7, 2003
2nd leg

| Morelia (Mexico) | 6–0 | (Mexico) Necaxa |
|---|---|---|
| Navia 9', 21'; Palacios 28'; Hernández 38'; Almirón 42'; Prieto 77' |

Estadio Morelos
Morelia, Mexico
- Morelia advanced 6–0 on aggregate.
May 14, 2003
2nd leg

| América (Mexico) | 0–4 (a.e.t.) | (Mexico) Toluca |
|---|---|---|
| | | Espinosa 69'; García 72', 88'; Ruiz 92' |

Estadio Azteca
Mexico City, Mexico
- Toluca advanced 5–4 on aggregate.

== Final ==
2003 CONCACAF Champions' Cup Final

=== First leg ===
September 17, 2003
20:10 (UTC-5)
First leg

| Morelia (Mexico) | 3–3 | (Mexico) Club Toluca |
|---|---|---|
| Navia 44', 63'; Álvarez 69' | | López 6', 82'; Lozano 13' |

Estadio Morelos
Morelia, Mexico

=== Second leg ===
October 8, 2003
19:10 (UTC-5)
Second leg

| Club Toluca (Mexico) | 2–1 | (Mexico) Morelia |
|---|---|---|
| da Silva 35'; Sánchez 54' | Report | Álvarez 81' |

Estadio Nemesio Díez
Toluca, Mexico
Referee: Gilberto Alcalá

Team details

Toluca
Morelia

| GK | 1 | (Argentina) Hernán Cristante |
| DF | 7 | (Mexico) Salvador Carmona |
| DF | 6 | (Paraguay) Paulo da Silva |
| DF | 4 | (Mexico) Emilio Hassan |
| DF | 29 | (Mexico) Miguel A. Carreón | Booked |
| MF | 5 | (Mexico) Israel López | Booked |
| MF | 8 | (Mexico) Rafael García |
| MF | 23 | (Mexico) Erik Espinosa | Booked |
| MF | 10 | (Brazil) (Mexico) Antonio Naelson | (substituted off) 88' |
| FW | 11 | (Uruguay) Vicente Sánchez |
| FW | 9 | (Paraguay) José Cardozo |
Substitutions:
| FW | 28 | (Mexico) Edgar González | (substituted on) 88' |
Manager:
(Brazil) (Mexico) Ricardo Ferretti

| GK | (Mexico) Moisés Muñoz |
| DF | (Mexico) Omar Trujillo |
| DF | (Mexico) Heriberto Morales |
| DF | (Argentina) Ariel Garcé | Booked |
| DF | (Mexico) Mariano Trujillo |
| MF | (Mexico) Nicolás Ramírez | (yellow card) (substituted off) 81' |
| MF | (Argentina) Jorge Almirón |
| MF | (Mexico) Miguel Zepeda | (substituted off) 73' |
| MF | (Mexico) Carlos Morales | Sent off (straight red) |
| FW | (Argentina) Damián Álvarez | Booked |
| FW | (Chile) Reinaldo Navia |
Substitutions:
| | (Mexico) Raúl Molina | (substituted on) 81' |
| | (Mexico) Jorge Santillana | (substituted on) 73' |
Manager:
(Argentina) Rubén O. Romano

- Toluca won 3–1 on points (5–4 on aggregate).

== Champions ==
CONCACAF Champions' Cup
2003 Winners

Club Deportivo Toluca
Second Title

== Top scorers ==
| Rank | Player | Club | Goals |
|---|---|---|---|
| 1 | (Chile) Reinaldo Navia | (Mexico) Morelia | 5 |
| 2 | (Uruguay) Vicente Sánchez | (Mexico) Toluca | 4 |
| 2 | (United States) Edson Buddle | (United States) Columbus Crew | 4 |
| 2 | (Uruguay) Marcelo Lipatin | (Mexico) América | 4 |
| 5 | (Mexico) Edgar García | (Mexico) Toluca | 3 |
| 5 | (Guatemala) Gonzalo Romero | (Guatemala) Municipal | 3 |
| 5 | (Costa Rica) Erick Scott | (Costa Rica) LD Alajuelense | 3 |
| 8 | (Argentina) Ariel Franco | (Mexico) Toluca | 2 |
| 8 | (Mexico) Israel López | (Mexico) Toluca | 2 |
| 8 | (Honduras) Amado Guevara | (Honduras) Motagua | 2 |
| 8 | (United States) Alexi Lalas | (United States) Los Angeles Galaxy | 2 |
| 8 | Juan Franco | (Mexico) Necaxa | 2 |
| 8 | (Mexico) Rodolfo Espinoza | (Mexico) Necaxa | 2 |
| 8 | (United States) Manny Lagos | (United States) San Jose Earthquakes | 2 |
| 8 | (Mexico) Cuauhtémoc Blanco | (Mexico) América | 2 |
| 8 | (Mexico) Santiago Fernández | (Mexico) América | 2 |
| 8 | (Costa Rica) Rolando Fonseca | (Costa Rica) LD Alajuelense | 2 |
| 8 | (Mexico) Adolfo Bautista | (Mexico) Morelia | 2 |
| 8 | (Peru) Roberto Palacios | (Mexico) Morelia | 2 |
| 8 | (Mexico) Ismael Íñiguez | (Mexico) Morelia | 2 |
| 8 | (Argentina) Damián Álvarez | (Mexico) Morelia | 2 |
| 22 | Various | | 1 |
