= 2000 U.S. Cup =

- Genre: sporting event
- Date: June
- Venue: RFK Stadium
- Locations: Washington, DC
- Country: U.S.
- Participants: United States, South Africa, Mexico, Ireland

The 2000 Nike United States Cup (U.S. Cup), a Nike-sponsored, United States Soccer Federation (USSF)-organized international football tournament, took place in June 2000. It was the seventh and last U.S. Cup in the series, which began in 1992.

The four teams in the competition were the United States team, Ireland, South Africa and Mexico. Of the three teams invited, Ireland was playing its third cup, Mexico its fifth (plus one U.S. Women's Cup) and South Africa its first. Ireland played in the inaugural cup in 1992 while Mexico won three straight Cups before the 2000 tournament. South Africa was the second African team to compete, after Nigeria in 1995.

== Pre-tournament controversy ==
The USSF had deliberately scheduled the 2000 U.S. Cup to fall during the 2000 European Championship. USSF hoped to attract two European nations from the pool of countries that failed to qualify for the Euro Cup. Once Euro Cup qualifications determined the final competitors, the USSF invited Ireland, Russia and Scotland, but only Ireland accepted the offer. The USSF then invited South Africa, an African Cup semi-finalist six months earlier. However, South Africa elected to use the U.S. Cup to give several younger players international experience and therefore did not bring its full senior team. While both the lack of European participation and South Africa's decision on player selection disappointed USSF, these paled in comparison to the controversy surrounding Mexico's participation.

After the 1999 U.S. Cup, USSF had negotiated a three-year contract with the Mexican Soccer Federation, obliging Mexico to send its full international team to the next three U.S. Cups. By the time the 2000 Cup was staged, three major developments threatened Mexico's participation. First, in May 2000 Alberto de la Torre became the new Mexican Football Association president. He took control of a federation which had just failed to qualify for the Summer Olympics and had lost badly at the Gold Cup. He quickly fired Hugo Enrique Kiese, chief of the national team commission and the official most responsible for Mexico's three-year contract with USSF. De la Torre was publicly critical of both Kiese and the U.S. Cup contract. To make matters worse, the Mexican League had also extended its season due to weathered out games. This meant that many of the top Mexican players would still be in the post-season during the tournament. Finally, FIFA had pressured CONCACAF to alter its World Cup qualification schedule, making the games earlier than anticipated. In fact, the United States and Mexican teams would leave the U.S. Cup and go immediately into preparation for those games. This meant that Mexican players, coming from their domestic league schedule, would have no time to rest before beginning a World Cup qualification campaign. Therefore, de la Torre, just weeks before the cup, asked USSF to reschedule it for August. With Ireland and South Africa confirmed and stadiums scheduled, USSF refused. De la Torre then told USSF that he would refuse to send the Mexican team, but USSF threatened a lawsuit, as well as FIFA sanctions. De la Torre brought Kiese back into the Mexican Federation and sent him to break the news to USSF, Mexico would send its "national team", but it would look a lot like the UNAM Pumas. After the tournament, USSF considered canceling its U.S. Cup contract with Mexico, a point which became moot as the 2000 tournament was the last played.

== June 3: Opening Day ==
The 2000 U.S. Cup opened with two games on 3 June 2000. The first match pitted South Africa against the host United States in Washington, D.C.'s RFK Stadium. While the United States team had typically drawn well at RFK Stadium in the past, only 16,750 fans arrived for a game played on a clear, 78 °F (26 °C) day. The USSF later blamed the low turnout to poor marketing by the local professional club D.C. United with which USSF had contracted, but this was merely one in a series of mis-steps associated with this cup. On the field, the United States dominated South Africa. In the 36th minute, Cobi Jones took a pass from Chris Armas, and cut from right to left across the box. As Jones recalls it, "As I was dribbling across the box, the player who was marking me said, 'Shoot it! Shoot it!' So I said, 'OK, I'll shoot it.' I think he was a little bit surprised after the fact." Jones scored again, then assisted on second half goals by Claudio Reyna and Ben Olsen. The game was also notable as United States defender Jeff Agoos reached his 100th cap.

June 3, 2000
16:00

United States	4–0	South Africa
Jones 36', 43'; Reyna 65'; Stewart 65'	(Report)

RFK Stadium
Attendance: 16,570
Referee: Antonio Marrufo (MEX) (Mexico)

United States - Kasey Keller; Tony Sanneh, Carlos Llamosa, Jeff Agoos, David Regis; Earnie Stewart (Steve Ralston 82'), Chris Armas, Claudio Reyna (captain), Eddie Lewis (Ben Olsen 66'); Brian McBride (Ante Razov 70'), Cobi Jones (Jason Kreis 84')

South Africa - Andre Arendse; Cyril Nzama, Pierre Issa, Andrew Rabutla, David Kannemeyer (Jacob Lekgetho 73'); Helman Mkhalele, Dumisa Ngobe, Thabo Mngomeni, Ivan McKinley (Delron Buckley 33'); Benedict McCarthy (George Koumantarakis 73'), Shaun Bartlett (captain)

== June 4: Mexico vs. Ireland ==
The second game began one day later in Chicago's Soldier Field where Mexico and Ireland played to a 2-2 tie. Over 36,000 fans attended despite heavy and nearly constant rain. Mexico dominated the first half but Ireland made a late comeback with goals by Richard Dunne and Dominic Foley. In the last minutes of the game, both teams had opportunities to score the winning goal, but Ireland's Kevin Kilbane shot just wide and Mexico's Joaquin Beltran's header was punched over the bar by Ireland's goalkeeper, Dean Kiely.

June 4, 2000
16:30

Republic of Ireland	2–2	Mexico
Dunne 60'; Foley 71'	(Report)	Osorno 38'; Sánchez 54'

Soldier Field
Attendance: 36,469
Referee: unknown

Ireland - Dean Kiely, Stephen Carr, Terry Phelan, Gary Breen, Richard Dunne (Phil Babb 82'), Jason McAteer, Matt Holland, Mark Kennedy, Barry Quinn (Kevin Kilbane 41'); Niall Quinn (captain), Robbie Keane (Dominic Foley 46')

Mexico - Sergio Bernal, Joaquin Beltran, Christian Ramirez (Gilberto Jimenez 69'), Raul Alpizar, Israel Lopez, Gerardo Torrado, Luis Perez, Antonio Sancho (captain) (Gerardo Galindo 81'), Horacio Sanchez Aguirre, Luis Ignacio Gonzalez, Daniel Osorno

== June 6: United States vs. Ireland ==
Ireland and the United States played to a 1-1 draw in front of another disappointingly low turnout. Only 16,319 fans, from a heavily Irish immigrant community, came to see the game which was played in a driving rainstorm in Foxboro Stadium. Once again, the USSF blamed local promoters for the poor numbers. On the field, Ireland's Dominic Foley scored first, taking a feed from Stephen McPhail before slipping past United States defender C.J. Brown and beating United States goalkeeper Brad Friedel. The Irish retained their lead until Ante Razov evened the match with a controversial goal. Earnie Stewart hit a clearly off-side Razov who scored as the Irish players stood still anticipating that the referee would whistle the ball dead. Instead, the referee and linesmen, all from Mexico, allowed the goal. Three minutes later, the stadium lost power for ten minutes. The game was delayed a further ten minutes as the lights warmed up. The low turnout, off-side goal and power outage merely added to the sense that this was a poorly run tournament.

After the game, the Irish hinted at a conspiracy between the United States and Mexico as an Irish victory would have won the tournament. Whatever the reason the Mexican officials allowed the goal, the USSF secretary general Hank Steinbrecher denied it was a conspiracy, saying, "I wish we were that sophisticated."

June 6, 2000
20:00

United States	1–1	Republic of Ireland
Razov 68'	(Report)	Foley 31'

Foxboro Stadium
Attendance: 16,319
Referee: Armando Archundia (MEX) (Mexico)

United States - Brad Friedel, Frankie Hejduk, C.J. Brown, Gregg Berhalter, Greg Vanney, Steve Ralston (Earnie Stewart 46'), John O'Brien (Claudio Reyna 60), Jovan Kirovski, Ben Olsen (Tony Sanneh 75'); Jason Kreis (Cobi Jones 65'), Ante Razov (Brian McBride 88')

Ireland - Alan Kelly; Stephen Carr, Gary Breen, Phill Babb, Terry Phelan; Stephen McPhail (Jason McAteer 37'), Matt Holland, Gareth Farrelly (Mark Kennedy 72'), Kevin Kilbane, Gary Doherty (Niall Quinn 72'), Dominic Foley (Barry Quinn 88')

== June 7: Mexico vs. South Africa ==
Mexico met South Africa before 27,815 fans in the Cotton Bowl. Mexico, clearly the superior side, defeated South Africa 4-2. The Mexican team scored twice in the first half before South Africa staged a brief come-back when Benni McCarthy scored in the 52nd minute making it 2-1. Mexican substitute and coach's son Horacio Sanchez Aguirre came into the game in the 79th minute and scored two quick goals. Thabo Mngomeni of South Africa scored from a penalty kick in the 89th minute.

June 7, 2000
20:00

Mexico	4–2	South Africa
Olalde 39'; Pérez 43'; Sánchez 80', 83'	(Report)	McCarthy 52'; Mngomeni 89'

Cotton Bowl
Attendance: 27,815
Referee: Hall (USA)

Mexico - Sergio Bernal, Joaquin Beltran, Christian Ramirez, Raul Alpizar, Israel Lopez, Gerardo Torrado, Luis Perez, Paulo Cesar Chavez (Carlos Cariño 68'), Jesus Olade (Horacio Sáchez 79'), Luis Hernandez (Luis Ignacio Gonzalez 68'), Daniel Orsono (Jaime Lozano 79')

South Africa - Andre Arendse, Cyril Nzama, Fabian McCarthy, Pierre Issa, Jacob Lekgetho, Dumisi Ngobe (Thabo Mngomeni 71'), Helman Mkhalele (Arthur Zwane 85'), Godfrey Sapula, George Koumantarakis (Patrick Mayo 71'), Benni McCarthy, Delron Buckley

== June 11: United States vs Mexico (US wins Cup) ==
Two games were played at Giants Stadium on the final day. In the first match, the United States and Mexico faced each other for the Cup title while Ireland and South Africa played for second place.

In the first game, the United States, for the first time in years, easily handled Mexico with a 3-0 win in front of 45,008 fans. In the 33rd minute, Brian McBride took a cross from Earnie Stewart and easily scored from 10 yards. Mexico kept it close until Christian Ramirez received his second yellow of the match in the 70th minute for pulling Cobi Jones to the ground. With Mexico down to ten men, Frankie Hejduk of the United States scored nine minutes later from a rebound from a Cobi Jones shot. Ante Razov scored his second goal of the tournament, when he intercepted a poorly timed pass between Mexican defender Paul Cesar Chavez and his goalkeeper. With this victory, the United States claimed its third U.S. Cup.

June 11, 2000
13:00

United States	3–0	Mexico
McBride 33'; Hejduk 79'; Razov 85'

Giants Stadium
Attendance: 45,008
Referee: Prendergast (Jamaica)

United States - Kasey Keller, Tony Sanneh, Carlos Llamosa (Gregg Berhalter 71'), Jeff Agoos, David Regis, Earnie Stewart (Frankie Hejduk 76'), Chris Armas, Claudio Reyna (captain), John O'Brien (Ben Olsen 64'), Brian McBride (Ante Razov 81'), Cobi Jones (Jovan Kirovski 89') Coach: Bruce Arena

Mexico - Sergio Bernal, Joaquin Beltran, Israel Lopez (captain), Gerrado Torrado, Luis Perez (Luis Ignacio Gonzalez 66'), Paulo Cesar Chavez (Carlos Carino 85'), Horacio Sanchez Aguirre (Jaime Lozano 46'), Jesus Olalde, Christian Ramirez Raul Lapizar, Daniel Orsono (Ignacio Flores 77') Coach: Hugo Sánchez

In the second game of the day, Ireland claimed the second spot in the Cup standings with a 2-1 victory over South Africa. South Africa scored first when captain Shaun Bartlett fed Benni McCarthy for a 14th-minute goal. Ireland came back with a Stephen McPhail goal in the 24th minute. Late in the second half, Niall Quinn scored the winning goal. This was his 20th international goal, placing him in a tie with Frank Stapleton on Ireland's all time goals list.

June 11, 2000
15:30

Republic of Ireland	2–1	South Africa
McPhail 24'; Quinn 80'	(Report)	McCarthy 14'

Giants Stadium
Attendance: 45,008
Referee: Badilla (Costa Rica)

Ireland - Shay Given, Stephen Carr, Terry Phelan, Phil Babb, Gary Breen, Jason McAteer (Mark Kennedy 45'), Matt Holland, Stephen McPhail (Barry Quinn 86'), Alan Mahon (Kevin Kilbane 42'), Dominic Foley (Robbie Keane 46'), Niall Quinn (captain)

South Africa - Andre Arendse, Cyril Nzama, Andrew Rabutla, Jacob Lekgetho, Aaron Mokoena, Quinton Fortune (Arthur Zwane 75'), Dumisi Ngobe (Patrick Mayo 46'), Helman Mkhalele (Thabo Mngomeni 75'), Benni McCarthy (Dillon Sheppard 46'), Delron Buckley (Godfrey Sapula 46'), Shaun Barlett (captain)

== Champion ==
2000 Nike U.S. Cup Winner:

USA
Third title

== Scorers ==
Three Goals

- (Mexico) Horacio Sanchez Aguirre (Golden Boot)

Two Goals

- (United States) Cobi Jones
- (United States) Ante Razov
- (Republic of Ireland) Dominic Foley
- (South Africa) Benni McCarthy

One Goal

- (United States) Claudio Reyna
- (United States) Earnie Stewart
- (United States) Frankie Hejduk
- (United States) Brian McBride
- (Republic of Ireland) Richard Dunne
- (Republic of Ireland) Stephen McPhail
- (Republic of Ireland) Niall Quinn
- (South Africa) Thabo Mngomeni
- (Mexico) Jesús Olalde
- (Mexico) Daniel Osorno
- (Mexico) Luis Perez

== Final rankings ==
Team		Pts	GP	W	D	L	GF	GA	Dif	Perc
1	United States	7	3	2	1	0	8	1	+7	77.8%
2	Republic of Ireland	5	3	1	2	0	5	4	+1	55.6%
3	Mexico	4	3	1	1	1	6	7	-1	44.4%
4	South Africa	0	3	0	0	3	3	10	-7	00.0%
