= Irênio Soares =

Brazilian footballer (born 1975)

Irênio
Personal information
- Full name: Irenio José Soares Filho
- Date of birth: May 27, 1975 (age 51)
- Place of birth: Carangola, Brazil
- Height: 1.71 m (5 ft 7 in)
- Position: Attacking midfielder

Youth career
- 1994–1995: América-MG

Senior career*
Years	Team	Apps	(Gls)
1996–2000	América-MG		
2000	Atlético Mineiro		
2001	Portuguesa-SP		
2001–2005	Tigres	152	(29)
2005–2006	América	20	(3)
2006–2007	San Luis	35	(3)
2007	Veracruz	15	(0)
2008	Atlético-PR	4	(0)
2008–2011	América-MG	36	(2)
2009	→ Clube Náutico Capibaribe (loan)	11	(1)
- * Club domestic league appearances and goals as of April 15, 2012

Irenio José Soares Filho (born 27 May 1975) is a Brazilian former footballer who played as an attacking midfielder.

== Career ==
Irênio José Soares Filho was born on 27 May 1975 on Carangola, Minas Gerais, Brazil.

Soares was an offensive midfielder who mainly plays down the left side of the pitch. He caught the eye of Mexican executives after a successful stint in his native country. After debuting in the Brazilian league playing for Minas Gerais in 1996, Soares was transferred to Atlético Mineiro, and after one year at Mineiro, he was once again transferred, this time to Portuguesa.

His play at Portuguesa brought him international attention, and he eventually landed in Monterrey, Mexico - where he signed for UANL Tigres. At Tigres, Soares quickly consolidated himself as a key part of an offense that featured Argentine standouts Walter Gaitan and Néstor Andrés Silvera, as well as Brazilian striker Kleber. Soares was part of a Tigres team that reached the Apertura 2003 finals against eventual champions CF Pachuca. After the Clausura 2005 season, Soares was transferred to Club América, which had won their tenth championship at the end of Clausura 2005.

The following season, Soares played 15 games and scored one goal, mostly coming on as a substitute, due to the strength of the team's roster. With his lone goal that season, Soares reached 30 scores in his 3.5 years playing in the Mexican league.

After playing in Club América, Soares was transferred to San Luis form whom he played and lost in the final against CF Pachuca.

For the 2007 season, he played for CD Veracruz.

In 2010, Irênio returned to América-MG.

== Honours ==
- Campeonato Brasileiro Série B: 1997
- Copa Sul-minas: 2000
