= Josué Castillejos =

Mexican footballer (born 1981)

Personal information
- Full name: Josué Castillejos Toledo
- Date of birth: 14 April 1981 (age 45)
- Place of birth: Toluca, Estado de Mexico, Mexico
- Height: 1.82 m (6 ft 0 in)
- Position: Midfielder

Team information
- Current team: Necaxa U-19 (Manager)

Senior career*
Years	Team	Apps	(Gls)
2002–2008	Toluca	80	(2)
2008	→ Chiapas (loan)	3	(0)
2008	Veracruz		
2009	Atlético Mexiquense	12	(0)
2009–2010	La Piedad	27	(1)
2010–2011	Altamira	29	(7)
2011–2015	UdeG	53	(2)

Managerial career
- 2016–2021: UdeG (Assistant)
- 2021–2022: UdeG Premier
- 2023–2024: Durango (Assistant)
- 2025–: Necaxa Reserves and Academy
- * Club domestic league appearances and goals

Josué Castillejos Toledo (born 14 April 1981) is a Mexican football coach and a former holding midfielder. He is an assistant coach with Durango.

== Club career ==
Born in Toluca, Castillejos is a product of Deportivo Toluca F.C.'s youth system. He made his Mexican Primera División debut with Toluca in 2002.

In 2008, Castillejos left Toluca to play on loan with Chiapas, and then for Primera A side Veracruz. Castillejos returned to Toluca in January 2009, but would not appear again for the club in the Primera División.
