= César Lozano =

Mexican footballer (born 1977)

Personal information
- Full name: César Amado Lozano Figueroa
- Date of birth: 31 May 1977 (age 49)
- Place of birth: Guadalajara, Jalisco, Mexico
- Height: 1.79 m (5 ft 10 in)
- Position: Goalkeeper

Team information
- Current team: Toluca (women) (Goalkeeper coach)

Senior career*
Years	Team	Apps	(Gls)
2007–2014	Toluca	42	(0)
2009–2010	→ Indios (loan)	13	(0)
2010–2013	→ San Luis (loan)	37	(0)
2014–2016	Chiapas	4	(0)

Managerial career
- 2019–2020: Toluca Reserves and Academy
- 2020–2023: Toluca (Goalkeeper coach)
- 2025–: Toluca (women) (Goalkeeper coach)
- * Club domestic league appearances and goals as of December 25, 2016

César Amado Lozano Figueroa (born 31 May 1977) is a Mexican former footballer who played as a goalkeeper. He Debuted with Toluca on March 4, 2007, Lozano be the first soccer player debut with 29 years old and has usually been the substitute keeper, but during the Apertura 2006 and Clausura 2007 season in the Mexican league, he was frequently the starting keeper due to Toluca using first-string keeper Hernán Cristante in the international competitions Copa Sudamericana and Copa Libertadores, and in the 2010–11 season with San Luis FC until the arrive of Óscar Pérez to San Luis for the 2011–12 season.
