= Octavio Valdez =

Mexican footballer (born 1973)

Personal information
- Full name: Octavio Valdez Martínez
- Date of birth: 7 December 1973 (age 52)
- Place of birth: Atlacomulco State of Mexico, Mexico
- Height: 1.79 m (5 ft 10 in)
- Position: Midfielder

Senior career*
Years	Team	Apps	(Gls)
1995–2001	Pachuca	111	(6)
2001–2002	America	21	(1)
2002–2003	Toluca	45	(4)
2003–2005	Pachuca	75	(6)
2005–2008	San Luis	83	(3)
2008–2009	→ Monterrey (loan)	11	(0)
2009–2010	Veracruz	40	(2)
2011	La Piedad	13	(2)

International career
2001–2004	Mexico	30	(0)

Managerial career
- 2014: Universidad del Fútbol
- 2015: Alto Rendimiento Tuzo
- 2016–2019: Pachuca Reserves and Academy
- 2020–2021: Pachuca (Assistant)
- 2022: Pachuca (women)
- 2023–2024: Toluca Reserves and Academy
Medal record
Representing Mexico
Winner	CONCACAF Gold Cup	2003
Runner-up	Copa America	2001
- * Club domestic league appearances and goals as of 4 January 2008

Octavio Valdez Martínez (born 7 December 1973) is a Mexican former professional footballer who played as a midfielder.

Valdez began his career by debuting on 11 January 1997, with Pachuca, in a 2–1 loss to Necaxa. After four years in Pachuca, he got transferred to Club América. Later he moved to Toluca for two seasons. Valdez later returned to Pachuca for two years. In the Apertura 2005 he got transferred to San Luis where he played until 2008.

== Honours ==
Pachuca

- Mexican Primera División: Invierno 1999, Apertura 2003

América

- Mexican Primera División: Verano 2002
- CONCACAF Giants Cup: 2001

Toluca

- Mexican Primera División: Apertura 2002

Mexico

- CONCACAF Gold Cup: 2003
