= Alberto Becerra =

Mexican footballer (born 1979)

Personal information
- Full name: Alberto Becerra Acco
- Date of birth: January 31, 1979 (age 47)
- Place of birth: Ciudad de México
- Position: Goalkeeper

Senior career*
Years	Team	Apps	(Gls)
2000–2004	Club América		
2004–2006	Club Puebla		
2006–2007	Club América		
- * Club domestic league appearances and goals

Alberto Becerra Acco (born January 31, 1979) is a Mexican former football goalkeeper.

== Career ==
Becerra's first professional game was for Club América on 31 March 2000, in a game against Santos Laguna in the Verano 2000 season. After letting in 11 goals in 5 games that season, Becerra saw limited action over the next few years, and he made a total of 12 appearances for America in the Primera Division de Mexico.

Before the Clausura 2004 season, Becerra was transferred to Puebla, where he was reserve goalkeeper to Oscar Dautt. He was in the Club America squad for the 2006 FIFA Club World Cup.
