= Joaquín Beltrán =

Mexican footballer (born 1977)

Personal information
- Full name: Joaquín Beltrán Vargas
- Date of birth: 29 April 1977 (age 49)
- Place of birth: Mexico City, Mexico
- Height: 1.86 m (6 ft 1 in)
- Position: Defender

Senior career*
Years	Team	Apps	(Gls)
1996–2006	Pumas	356	(16)
2006–2007	Necaxa	38	(1)
2007–2009	Cruz Azul	80	(2)
2009–2010	Querétaro	51	(2)

International career
1999–2007	Mexico	17	(0)
- * Club domestic league appearances and goals

Joaquín Beltrán Vargas (born 29 April 1977) is a Mexican former professional footballer who played as a defender. He last played for Querétaro F.C. in 2010.

== Club career ==
Beltran has spent most of his career with Pumas. He debuted on 24 November 1996 for the team against Morelia, where Pumas team won 3–2.

After contract negotiations failed with Pumas, he was signed by Necaxa for the Apertura 2006 tournament. He was signed by Cruz Azul for the start of the 2007 Apertura tournament. In the 2009 Draft he was signed by Querétaro F.C. as a free agent.

== Honours ==
Pumas

- Mexico Primera División: Clausura 2004, Apertura 2004

Individual

- CONCACAF Pre-Olympic Tournament Top Scorer: 2000 (Shared)
