= Uzziel Lozano =

Mexican footballer and manager (born 1981)

Personal information
- Full name: Héctor Uzziel Lozano Melchor
- Date of birth: 27 December 1981 (age 44)
- Place of birth: Tonalá, Jalisco, Mexico
- Height: 1.78 m (5 ft 10 in)
- Position: Forward

Senior career*
Years	Team	Apps	(Gls)
2000–2011	Toluca		
2003	→ Fénix (loan)		
2008–2009	→ Real de Colima (loan)		
2009	→ UdeG (loan)		
2011–2012	Durango		

Managerial career
- 2019–2020: UAEM
- * Club domestic league appearances and goals

Héctor Uzziel Lozano Melchor is a Mexican football manager and former footballer who played as a forward. Recently was the manager of the Mexican Liga TDP club Potros UAEM. As a footballer, he spent most of his career playing for Toluca.

== Career ==
Lozano was born in Tonalá, Jalisco on 27 November 1981. He played his youth career at the Toluca Academy and made his professional debut in Primera División on 24 September 2000 for Toluca in a match against Morelia.

As part of the Toluca squad, Lozano won the Apertura 2002 and Apertura 2005 tournaments.

Lozano had a brief spell playing in Uruguay for Fénix in 2003, where he was part of the squad that played that year Copa Libertadores.

In 2019, Lozano was appointed as manager of the Liga TDP club Potros UAEM.

== Honours ==
=== Club ===
Toluca

- Mexican Primera División: Apertura 2002, Apertura 2005
