= Rafael García (footballer, born 1974) =

Mexican footballer and manager (born 1974)

Personal information
- Full name: José Rafael García Torres
- Date of birth: 14 August 1974 (age 52)
- Place of birth: Mexico City, Mexico
- Height: 5 ft 9 in (1.75 m)
- Position: Midfielder

Senior career*
Years	Team	Apps	(Gls)
1992–1998	UNAM	134	(19)
1998–2004	Toluca	214	(27)
2004–2006	Cruz Azul	32	(2)
2005–2006	→ Atlas (loan)	27	(0)
2007–2008	Veracruz	19	(0)

International career
1996–2006	Mexico	52	(3)

Managerial career
- 2009: Atlas Reserves and Academy
- 2013–2015: Atlas (Assistant)
- 2015–2016: Chiapas (Assistant)
- 2016–2017: América (Assistant)
- 2017: Puebla
- 2018: Pyramids (Assistant)
- 2019: Toluca (Assistant)
- 2020: Atlas (Assistant)
- 2021–2024: Sinaloa
Medal record
Representing Mexico
Winner	FIFA Confederations Cup	1999
Winner	CONCACAF Gold Cup	2003
Third place	Copa America	1997
Third place	Copa America	1999
- * Club domestic league appearances and goals

José Rafael "Chiquis" García Torres (Note: In this Spanish name, the first or paternal surname is García and the second or maternal family name is Torres.) (born 14 August 1974) is a Mexican former professional footballer and current manager.

As a player, he was a participant in the 2002 and 2006 World Cups.

== Club career ==
A midfielder comfortable in the center or on the left side, García began his club career with UNAM in 1992. During the 1994–95 season, he established himself in the Pumas lineup, appearing in 32 matches and scoring 8 goals. In the summer of 1998 he left for Toluca, beginning a six-year stint at the club. At Toluca, García won league titles during the Verano 1999, Verano 2000, and Apertura 2002 seasons, appearing in the finals on each occasion. Playing wide on the left alongside Fabián Estay and Víctor Ruiz in his early years with Toluca, García later formed a central midfield trio with Israel López and Antonio Naelson. In 2004, he moved to Cruz Azul, joined Atlas for one year in 2005, then returned to Cruz Azul briefly before finishing his top-division career in 2008 with Veracruz.

== International career ==
García also earned 52 caps for the Mexico national team, scoring three times. He made his international debut on February 7, 1996, in a 2–1 loss against Chile. In the 1996 U.S. Cup, he scored his first international goal with a bending free kick against the United States at the Rose Bowl. García represented Mexico in four matches of the 1997 Copa América, but missed the 1998 FIFA World Cup. After the appointment of Manuel Lapuente as national coach, García appeared at the 1999 Copa América and the 1999 FIFA Confederations Cup, which Mexico won. Recalled to the team for the 2002 World Cup, he played 14 minutes in the opening-round match against Italy. García remained in the team under new coach Ricardo Antonio Lavolpe, helping Mexico to victory in the 2003 CONCACAF Gold Cup and scoring in the quarterfinal against Jamaica. Although he also played in the 2005 CONCACAF Gold Cup and five qualifying matches for the 2006 FIFA World Cup, he did not play any matches in the 2006 competition itself. García made his final international appearance in a 2–1 loss to the Netherlands on June 1, 2006. New light has surfaced that nepotism was the reason why he participated in the World Cup games of 2006 as he is a relative of then Coach Ricardo La Volpe.

At junior international levels, García competed for Mexico at the 1991 FIFA U-17 World Championship and 1993 FIFA World Youth Championship, as well as the 1996 Summer Olympics.

=== International goals ===
Scores and results list Mexico's goal tally first.

Goal	Date	Venue	Opponent	Score	Result	Competition
1.	16 June 1996	Rose Bowl, Pasadena, United States	United States	1–1	2–2	1996 U.S. Cup
2.	20 July 2003	Estadio Azteca, Mexico City, Mexico	Jamaica	2–0	5–0	2003 CONCACAF Gold Cup
3.	31 March 2004	The Home Depot Center, Carson, United States	Costa Rica	1–0	2–0	Friendly

== Honours ==
Toluca

- Mexican Primera División: Verano 1998, Verano 1999, Verano 2000, Apertura 2002
- Campeón de Campeones: 2003
- CONCACAF Champions' Cup: 2003

Mexico

- FIFA Confederations Cup: 1999
- CONCACAF Gold Cup: 2003
- Pan American Games Silver Medal: 1995
- CONCACAF Pre-Olympic Tournament: 1996

Individual

- CONCACAF Gold Cup Best XI: 2003
