= Jesús Olalde =

Mexican footballer (born 1974)

Personal information
- Full name: Jesús Javier Olalde Ortiz
- Date of birth: 5 May 1974 (age 52)
- Place of birth: Mexico City, Mexico
- Height: 1.70 m (5 ft 7 in)
- Position: Forward

Senior career*
Years	Team	Apps	(Gls)
1992–2000	UNAM	230	(83)
2000–2005	UANL	146	(35)
2006	Atlante	30	(3)
2007	BUAP	30	(6)

International career
1999–2004	Mexico	17	(3)
- * Club domestic league appearances and goals as of February 1, 2008

Jesús Javier Olalde Ortiz (Note: In this Spanish name, the first or paternal surname is Olalde and the second or maternal family name is Ortiz.) (born 5 May 1974) is a Mexican former footballer who played as a striker.

== Career ==
Born in Mexico City, Olalde grew up supporting Club América. However, he began his professional football career with América's rival Pumas UNAM, where he became the leading scorer in league matches between Pumas and América with eight goals. He played for Tigres de la UANL, Atlante F.C. and Lobos de la BUAP before retiring.

=== International goals ===
Scores and results list Mexico's goal tally first.

Goal	Date	Venue	Opponent	Score	Result	Competition
1.	7 June 2000	Cotton Bowl, Dallas, United States	South Africa	1–0	4–2	2000 U.S. Cup
2.	1 July 2000	3Com Park at Candlestick Point, San Francisco, United States	El Salvador	2–0	3–0	Friendly
3.	19 March 2003	Texas Stadium, Irving, United States	Bolivia	2–0	2–0	Friendly
