= Emilio Mora =

Mexican footballer (born 1978)

Personal information
- Full name: Hugo Emilio Mora López
- Date of birth: 7 March 1978 (age 48)
- Place of birth: Apatzingán, Michoacán, Mexico
- Height: 1.72 m (5 ft 8 in)
- Position: Forward

Senior career*
Years	Team	Apps	(Gls)
1996–2000	Morelia	96	(12)
2000–2001	Cruz Azul	41	(8)
2002–2003	Guadalajara	51	(16)
2003–2004	Veracruz	36	(17)
2004	Cruz Azul	11	(1)
2005	Veracruz	21	(4)
2006	San Luis	18	(2)
2006–2007	Querétaro	23	(4)

International career
1998–2004	Mexico	12	(1)
Medal record
Men's football
Representing Mexico
Pan American Games
Gold medal – first place	1999 Winnipeg	Team competition
- * Club domestic league appearances and goals

Hugo Emilio Mora López (born 7 March 1978) is a Mexican former footballer who played as a forward.

Mora made his first division debut in 1996 at age 18 with Monarcas Morelia. Mora went on to play for five other clubs in Mexico, including Cruz Azul and Guadalajara.

Mora also appeared 12 times and scored one goal with the Mexico national team. He was called up to the 1998 CONCACAF Gold Cup which Mexico won and also the 2000 CONCACAF Gold Cup.

== Honours ==
Mexico

- CONCACAF Gold Cup: 1998

== Career statistics ==
=== International goals ===
No.	Date	Venue	Opponent	Score	Result	Competition	Ref.
1.	February 17, 2000	Los Angeles Memorial Coliseum, Los Angeles, United States	Guatemala	1–0	1–1	2000 CONCACAF Gold Cup	
