= Édgar González (Mexican footballer) =

Mexican footballer (born 1980)

Edgar González
Personal information
- Full name: Edgar González Franco
- Date of birth: July 3, 1980 (age 46)
- Place of birth: Otzolotepec, Edo. de Mexico
- Height: 1.74 m (5 ft 8 1/2 in)
- Position: Forward

Senior career*
Years	Team	Apps	(Gls)
2002–2004	Toluca	63	(3)
2004–2006	→ América (loan)	2	(0)
2006–2008	→ Toluca (loan)	36	(0)
2008–2009	→ Tijuana (loan)	15	(3)
2009–2010	→ La Piedad (loan)	32	(2)
2010–2011	→ Altamira (loan)	28	(8)
2011–2016	UdeG	100	(20)
2015	→ Atl. San Luis (loan)	7	(1)
2015–2016	→ Alebrijes (loan)	9	(0)
2016–2017	Potros UAEM	29	(1)

Managerial career
- 2020–2024: Toluca Reserves and Academy
- * Club domestic league appearances and goals as of 17 May 2018

Edgar González Franco (born 3 July 1980) is a Mexican former footballer who most recently played as a striker for Potros UAEM.

== Career ==
González made his debut with Club Toluca in the Apertura 2002 tournament against Necaxa. He made a total of 42 Primera appearances for Toluca before moving to Club América for the Apertura 2004. However, he only made two league appearances at America and he returned to Toluca for the Apertura 2006, making a further 36 appearances for them up to the end of the Clausura 2008.

After leaving Toluca he played for Club Tijuana (2008–09), C.F. La Piedad (2009–10), Estudiantes de Altamira (2010–11) and Club Universidad de Guadalajara, in the Liga de Ascenso.
