= Salvador Carmona =

Mexican footballer (born 1975)

Personal information
- Full name: José Salvador Carmona Álvarez
- Date of birth: 22 August 1975 (age 51)
- Place of birth: Mexico City, Mexico
- Height: 5 ft 8 in (1.73 m)
- Position: Defender

Senior career*
Years	Team	Apps	(Gls)
1993–2000	Toluca	159	(9)
2000–2001	Atlante	48	(1)
2002–2003	Toluca	78	(8)
2004	Guadalajara	38	(1)
2005–2007	Cruz Azul	46	(2)
Total		369	(21)

International career
1996–2005	Mexico	83	(0)
Medal record
Men's football
Representing Mexico
FIFA Confederations Cup
Winner	1999 Mexico
CONCACAF Gold Cup
Winner	1998 United States
Copa América
Third place	1999 Paraguay
- * Club domestic league appearances and goals

José Salvador Carmona Álvarez (born 22 August 1975) is a Mexican former professional footballer who played as a defender. He received a lifetime ban from FIFA after failing two separate anti-doping tests. Despite the ban, Carmona is widely regarded as one of the best full-backs in Mexican football history and was considered among the top defenders in Liga MX during his playing career.

During his career, he obtained 84 caps for the Mexico national team since his debut in 1996. He represented Mexico in the 1998 and 2002 FIFA World Cup editions.

He was involved in a doping controversy and suspended one year as was teammate Aaron Galindo, in the 2005 FIFA Confederations Cup, therefore prohibiting both players from representing Mexico in the 2006 FIFA World Cup. On 16 May 2007, Carmona received a lifetime ban by the Court of Arbitration for Sport for testing positive once again in an antidoping control test taken on 31 January 2006.

== Career statistics ==
=== International ===
Appearances and goals by national team and year
National team	Year	Apps	Goals
Mexico	1996	1	0
Mexico	1997	3	0
Mexico	1998	12	0
Mexico	1999	21	0
Mexico	2000	6	0
Mexico	2001	6	0
Mexico	2002	7	0
Mexico	2003	13	0
Mexico	2004	6	0
Mexico	2005	8	0
Total		83	0

== Honours ==
Toluca

- Mexican Primera División: Verano 1998, Verano 1999, Verano 2000, Apertura 2002
- Campeón de Campeones: 2003
- CONCACAF Champions' Cup: 2003

Mexico

- FIFA Confederations Cup: 1999
- CONCACAF Gold Cup: 1998, 2003

Individual

- Mexican Primera División Best full-back: 1998, 2002, 2003

== See also ==
- List of sportspeople sanctioned for doping offences
