= Vicente Sánchez =

Uruguayan footballer (born 1979)

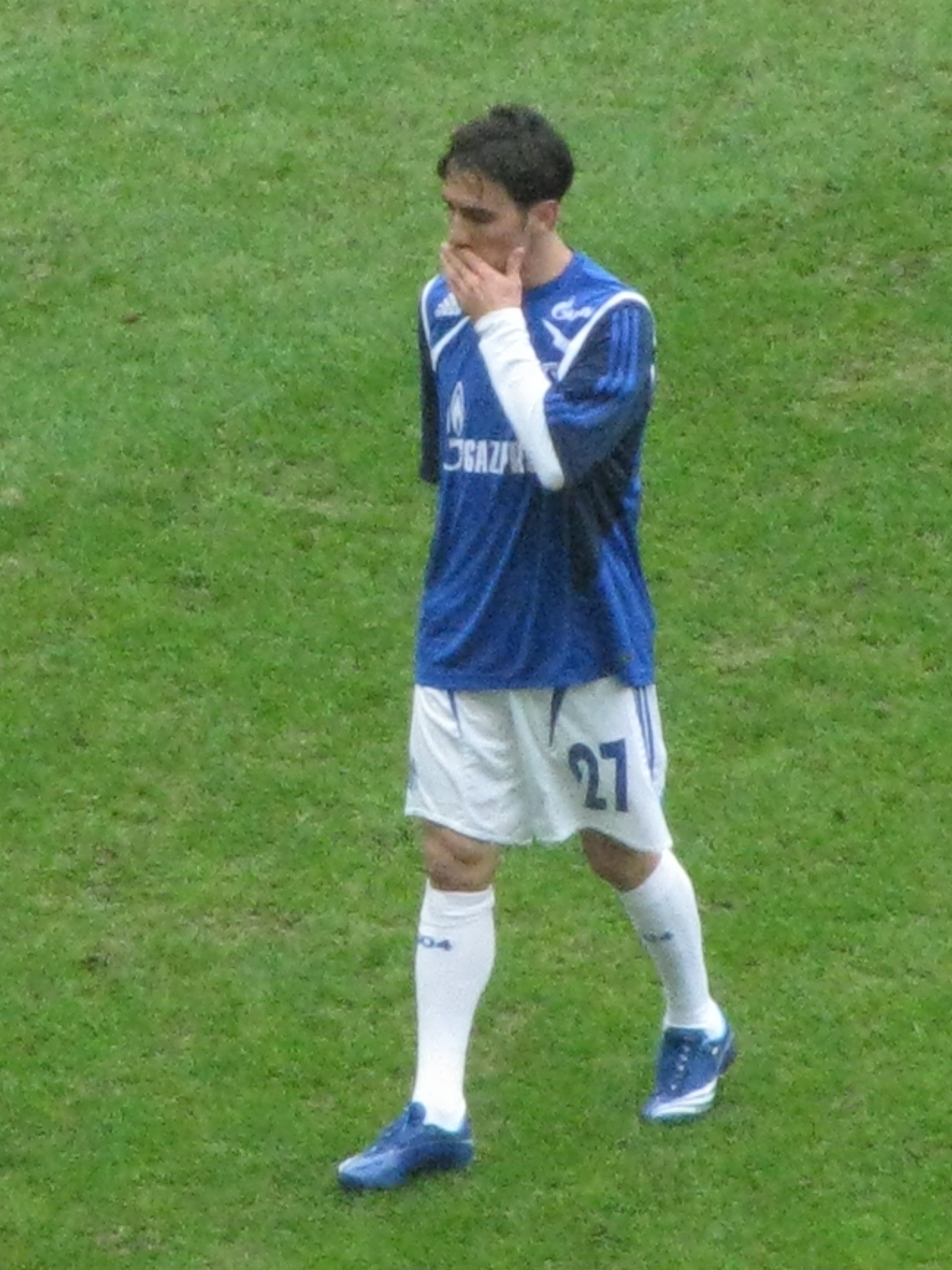

Personal information
- Full name: Vicente Martín Sánchez Bragunde
- Date of birth: 7 December 1979 (age 46)
- Place of birth: Montevideo, Uruguay
- Height: 1.69 m (5 ft 7 in)
- Position: Winger

Youth career
- 1998–1999: Sud América

Senior career*
Years	Team	Apps	(Gls)
2000	Sud América	17	(0)
2000	Tacuarembó	11	(1)
2001	Nacional	9	(2)
2001–2007	Toluca	242	(85)
2008–2010	Schalke 04	50	(3)
2010–2012	América	49	(11)
2012–2013	Nacional	25	(4)
2013–2015	Colorado Rapids	55	(11)
2016	Defensor Sporting	10	(2)
2017	Houston Dynamo	21	(2)
2021	Rio Grande Valley FC	29	(2)

International career
2001–2008	Uruguay	31	(5)

Managerial career
- 2022: Pachuca (assistant)
- 2024–2025: Cruz Azul U23
- 2025: Cruz Azul (interim)
- 2025: Cruz Azul
- 2026: Emelec
- * Club domestic league appearances and goals

Vicente Martín Sánchez Bragunde (Spanish pronunciation: [biˈsente ˈsantʃes]; born 7 December 1979) is a Uruguayan football manager and former player.

== Club career ==
Sánchez was born in Montevideo. He played for Sud América, Tacuarembó, Deportivo Toluca, FC Schalke 04, América and Nacional. On 18 January 2008, he joined German club Schalke, where he remained for two seasons. He played in Mexico again for Club América. On 1 August 2010, he scored his first goal for Club América in a match versus Chiapas.

Sánchez made the move to Major League Soccer on 6 August 2013 when he signed for Colorado Rapids. On 14 September 2013, he scored his first goal for Colorado and forced an own goal in a 2–1 win over FC Dallas.

Even with his playing time being carefully managed and his appearances limited to substitutions in the last half of most games, Sánchez was a bright spot in an otherwise lackluster 2015 season. Despite being a crowd favorite with the Colorado Rapids fans and the #2 scorer for the team, Sánchez's 2016 contract option was declined as the Colorado Rapids front office set out to acquire new talent in the form of players such as Marco Pappa, Shkëlzen Gashi, Jermaine Jones and Tim Howard. Sánchez went through the MLS Re-Entry Draft but was not selected by any other team.

He joined his hometown club Defensor Sporting for the 2016 Primera Division Clausura season and helped his team finish fourth, qualifying for the 2017 Copa Sudamericana.

Sánchez returned to MLS and joined the Houston Dynamo for the 2017 season. He helped the Dynamo reach the playoff and got the game winning assist in their opening game versus Sporting Kansas City.

On 2 April 2021, it was announced that Sánchez would come out of retirement to play and coach for USL Championship side Rio Grande Valley FC.

== Managerial career ==
=== Cruz Azul ===
On 25 January 2025, Cruz Azul appointed Sánchez as interim head coach following the unexpected departure of Martín Anselmi. After eight matches, the club announced that he would remain in charge for the rest of the season. During his tenure, Sánchez led Cruz Azul to their seventh CONCACAF Champions Cup trophy, defeating Vancouver Whitecaps FC 5–0 in the final. On 6 June, Cruz Azul and Sánchez parted ways.

=== Emelec ===
On 5 February 2026, he was appointed head coach of Emelec in Ecuador. On 14 May, he left by mutual consent.

== International career ==
He played for Uruguay national football team in the 2007 Copa América and has won 31 caps for the national side, scoring five goals.

=== International goals ===
No.	Date	Venue	Opponent	Score	Result	Competition	Ref.
1	13 July 2004	Estadio Miguel Grau, Piura	Argentina	2–2	2–4 (L)	2004 Copa América	
2	24 July 2004	Estadio Garcilaso de la Vega, Cuzco	Colombia	1–2	1–2 (W)	2004 Copa América	
3	18 October 2006	Estadio Centenario, Montevideo	Venezuela	1–0	4–0 (W)	Friendly	
4	30 June 2007	Estadio Polideportivo, San Cristóbal	Bolivia	0–1	0–1 (W)	2007 Copa América	
5	13 October 2007	Estadio Centenario, Montevideo	Bolivia	4–0	5–0 (W)	2010 FIFA World Cup qualification	

== Personal life ==
Sánchez holds a U.S. green card which qualifies him as a domestic player for MLS roster purposes.

== Managerial statistics ==
As of match played 10 May 2026

Managerial record by team and tenure
Team	From	To	Record								Ref.
Team	From	To	G	W	D	L	GF	GA	GD	Win %	Ref.
Cruz Azul	25 January 2025	6 June 2025	28	18	8	2	52	22	+30	64.29	
Emelec	5 February 2026	14 May 2026	13	4	3	6	10	16	−6	30.77	
Total			41	22	11	8	62	38	+24	53.66	—

== Honours ==
=== Player ===
Toluca

- Primera División de México: Apertura 2002, Apertura 2005
- CONCACAF Champions' Cup: 2003

Uruguay

- Copa América third place: 2004

=== Manager ===
Cruz Azul

- CONCACAF Champions Cup: 2025

=== Individual ===
- Mexican Primera División Golden Ball: Apertura 2006
