= Christian Ramírez (footballer, born 1978) =

Mexican footballer

Personal information
- Full name: Christian Ramirez Diaz
- Date of birth: 8 March 1978 (age 48)
- Place of birth: Mexico City, Mexico
- Height: 1.73 m (5 ft 8 in)
- Position: Defender

Senior career*
Years	Team	Apps	(Gls)
2000–2001	UNAM		
2001	Toluca		
2001–2002	UNAM		
2002–2003	Toluca		
2003	Monarcas Morelia		
2003–2004	América		
2004–2005	Guadalajara		
2005–2007	UNAM		

International career
1997	Mexico U20	3	(0)
2000	Mexico	3	(0)

Managerial career
- 2013–2014: Pumas Naucalpan
- 2014: UNAM Reserves and Academy
- 2014–2015: Pumas Naucalpan
- 2015–2016: Real Cuautitlán
- 2016–2017: Toluca Reserves and Academy
- 2017: Toluca Premier
- 2019: Querétaro Reserves and Academy
- 2021–2025: Mazatlán Reserves and Academy
- 2022: Mazatlán (interim)
- 2023: Mazatlán (interim)
- 2026: Mazatlán
- * Club domestic league appearances and goals

Christian Ramirez Diaz (born 8 August 1978) is a Mexican football coach and retired player who played as a defender.

Ramirez stands at 5'8 and weighs 178 lbs. He wears jersey #13. His only match for Chivas was as a start in Clausura 2006, against Monarcas Morelia. He played until the 75th minute, when he received a direct red card for a rough slide tackle. Ramirez played one match in the Clausura playoffs. He was called up from the Chivas "farm team", Chivas Coras Tepic, when 6 star players went to the Mexico National Team.

He is a journeyman player, whose career dates from 2000. His inaugural professional team was Pumas in Invierno 2000-2001. During Vernano 2000-2001, he was shipped to Toluca. He returned to Pumas for Invierno 2001-2002 and continued in Verano. He was traded to Toluca for Apertura 2002-2003, then went to Morelia. In Apertura 2003-2004, he was traded to América. He would be sent down to play with América's Primera A team. Clausura 2004-2005 found him traded to its rival club, Chivas.

His career stats are: of 158 matches he started in 142 while being substituted 16 times, played 12,480 minutes, 4 goals, 1 own goal, 40 yellow cards, and 5 red cards.
