= Erick Espinosa =

Mexican footballer (born 1980)

Erik Espinosa
Personal information
- Full name: Erik Osbaldo Espinosa Delgadillo
- Date of birth: 13 January 1980 (age 46)
- Place of birth: Guadalajara, Mexico
- Height: 1.79 m (5 ft 10 in)
- Position: Midfielder

Senior career*
Years	Team	Apps	(Gls)
2000–2008	Toluca	191	(6)
2008–2011	Veracruz	35	(1)
2009–2010	→ Correcaminos (loan)	20	(0)
2010–2011	→ Alacranes (loan)	29	(0)

International career^{‡}
2002	Mexico	1	(0)
- * Club domestic league appearances and goals as of 16 July 2009 ‡ National team caps and goals as of 19 March 2009

Erik Osbaldo Espinosa Delgadillo (born 13 January 1980) is a Mexican former footballer who played as a midfielder.

Espinosa has been capped once while in the Mexico national team – it was at the 2002 CONCACAF Gold Cup, where he played in a 1–0 win over El Salvador.
