= José Manuel Cruzalta =

Mexican footballer (born 1978)

Personal information
- Full name: José Manuel Cruzalta Cruz
- Date of birth: 8 April 1978 (age 48)
- Place of birth: Tenancingo, Mexico
- Height: 1.65 m (5 ft 5 in)
- Position: Defender

Team information
- Current team: Artesanos Metepec (Assistant)

Senior career*
Years	Team	Apps	(Gls)
2001–2013	Toluca	170	(1)
2010–2011	→ Morelia (loan)	2	(0)
2012–2013	→ Lobos BUAP (loan)	2	(0)

Managerial career
- 2014: Potros UAEM (Assistant)
- 2015–2021: Toluca Reserves and Academy
- 2019: Toluca (Interim)
- 2024–: Artesanos Metepec (Assistant)
- * Club domestic league appearances and goals as of 6 July 2013

José Manuel Cruzalta Cruz (born 8 April 1978) is a retired Mexican football defender.

== Club career ==
He made his debut with Toluca on 14 February 2001 in a 3–1 loss against Tecos UAG.

Cruzalta also split time with Toluca's farm team, Atlético Mexiquense, where he served as the team's captain.

== Honours ==
- Toluca
  - Primera División de México (4): Apertura 2002, Apertura 2005, Apertura 2008, Bicentenario 2010
