= Maximiliano Cuberas =

Argentine footballer

Personal information
- Full name: Maximiliano Pablo Cuberas Escalas
- Date of birth: 16 August 1973 (age 53)
- Place of birth: Villada, Argentina
- Height: 1.81 m (5 ft 11 in)
- Position: Centre-back

Team information
- Current team: Fluminense (assistant)

Youth career
- Rosario Central

Senior career*
Years	Team	Apps	(Gls)
1992–1993	Rosario Central	16	(0)
1993–1997	Colón	125	(6)
1997–2001	Rosario Central	103	(7)
2001–2004	Toluca	115	(2)
2004–2006	Lanús	5	(0)
2006–2008	Ferro Carril Oeste	25	(0)
Total		386	(15)

Managerial career
- 2011–2012: Barcelona SC (assistant)
- 2012–2013: Racing Club (assistant)
- 2013–2015: LDU Quito (assistant)
- 2015–2016: Santos Laguna (assistant)
- 2016–2017: Independiente Medellín (assistant)
- 2017: Alavés (assistant)
- 2018: Cerro Porteño (assistant)
- 2018–2021: Lanús (assistant)
- 2022–2024: LDU Quito (assistant)
- 2024: São Paulo (assistant)
- Fluminense (assistant)
- * Club domestic league appearances and goals

Maximiliano Pablo Cuberas Escalas (born 16 August 1973) is an Argentine football coach and former player who played as a centre-back. He is the current assistant coach of Brazilian club Fluminense.
