= Sergio Ponce (Mexican footballer) =

Mexican footballer (born 1981)

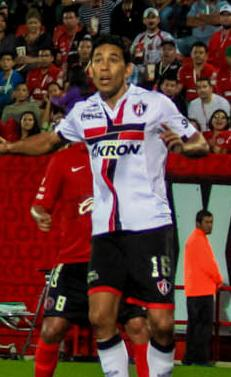
- Ponce playing for Atlas

Personal information
- Full name: Sergio Amaury Ponce Villegas
- Date of birth: 13 August 1981 (age 45)
- Place of birth: Tepic, Nayarit, Mexico
- Height: 1.76 m (5 ft 9 in)
- Position: Midfielder

Senior career*
| Years | Team | Apps | (Gls) |
| 2001–2008 | Toluca | 183 | (18) |
| 2009–2010 | Guadalajara | 29 | (4) |
| 2010 | → Tigres UANL (loan) | 13 | (0) |
| 2010–2011 | → San Luis (loan) | 33 | (2) |
| 2011–2012 | → Querétaro (loan) | 33 | (3) |
| 2012–2014 | Atlas | 40 | (0) |
| 2015–2016 | Coras | 10 | (1) |

International career^{‡}
| 2004 | Mexico U23 | 3 | (0) |
| 2008 | Mexico | 2 | (0) |

Managerial career
- 2019-2020: Atlas (Assistant)
- * Club domestic league appearances and goals as of 10 May 2013 ‡ National team caps and goals as of 4 June 2008

Sergio Amaury Ponce Villegas (born 13 August 1981) is a Mexican former professional footballer who played as a midfielder.

== Career ==
He started his career on August 11 for Toluca FC in 2001 playing against Monterrey, the game had ended in a draw. He played with Toluca from 2001 through 2008 raising 3 championships. The last time Toluca were crowned champions was in the game against Cruz Azul where Sergio scored a goal in the first length of the championship.

Sergio was part of the Mexican 2004 Olympic football team, who exited in the first round, having finished third in group A, below group winners Mali and South Korea.

=== C.D. Guadalajara ===
Ponce signed with Club Deportivo Guadalajara on December 19, 2008, in exchange for Sergio Santana and Antonio Olvera, for a one-year loan. He scored his first goal with Chivas on January 3, 2009, playing against America which ended in a 1–1 draw. Sergio later played the next 3 games with Guadalajara in the InterLiga. He scored in his Clausura debut with Guadalajara in a 3–3 draw against Cruz Azul and he scored the winning goal in the Superclasico against America by heading the ball into Guillermo Ochoa's gap into the back of the net, on April 19, 2009.

=== Tigres UANL ===
On December 22, 2009, Sergio Amaury Ponce joined Tigres on a loan from Guadalajara for the Torneo Bicentenario 2010.

=== Coras de Tepic ===
He was loaned to Coras de Tepic for the 2015 Ascenso MX season.

== Honours ==
Mexico U23

- CONCACAF Olympic Qualifying Championship: 2004
