= Hassan Viades =

Mexican footballer (born 1978)

Personal information
- Full name: Emilio Hassan Viades Slim
- Date of birth: 10 January 1978 (age 48)
- Place of birth: Mexico City, Mexico
- Height: 1.76 m (5 ft 9 in)
- Position: Defender

Senior career*
Years	Team	Apps	(Gls)
1999–2007	Toluca	166	(4)
2007–2008	Necaxa	27	(0)
2008–2009	Cruz Azul	5	(0)
- * Club domestic league appearances and goals

Emilio Hassan Viades Slim (born 10 January 1978) is a Mexican former footballer who played for Toluca, Necaxa and Cruz Azul in the Mexican First Division.

As defender, he made his debut on 6 September 1999 against Pumas UNAM, a game which resulted in a 2–0 victory for Toluca. Viades played mostly all his career as a left back.
