= Israel López (footballer) =

Mexican footballer (born 1974)

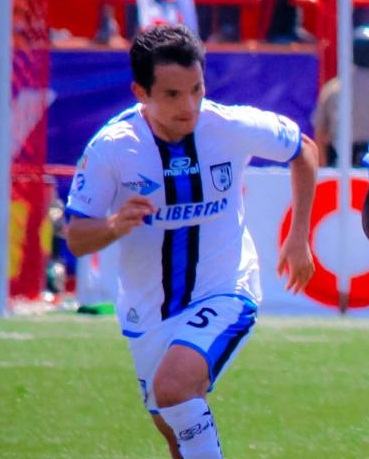
- López with Querétaro in 2011

Personal information
- Full name: Israel López Hernández
- Date of birth: 29 September 1974 (age 52)
- Place of birth: Mexico City, Mexico
- Height: 1.66 m (5 ft 5 1/2 in)
- Position: Midfielder

Senior career*
Years	Team	Apps	(Gls)
1993–2001	UNAM	238	(12)
2001–2002	Guadalajara	35	(4)
2002–2006	Toluca	149	(20)
2006–2007	Cruz Azul	56	(3)
2007–2009	Toluca	79	(6)
2009	Cruz Azul	13	(0)
2010	Necaxa	11	(0)
2010–2011	Tecos	17	(3)
2011–2012	Querétaro	18	(0)
Total		616	(48)

International career
2004	Mexico Olympic (O.P.)	3	(0)
2000–2007	Mexico	26	(0)

Managerial career
- 2016–2019: UNAM Reserves and Academy
- 2019–2021: UNAM (assistant)
- 2021–2022: Toluca Reserves and Academy
- * Club domestic league appearances and goals

Israel López Hernández (born 29 September 1974) is a Mexican former professional footballer who played as a midfielder.

== Club career ==
Initially a right fullback who converted to the midfield during the prime years of his career, López made his debut at age 19 with UNAM in 1993. By the following year he was a starter in defense alongside players such as Claudio Suárez and went on to make 238 appearances for the club, but the middle and late 1990s were generally disappointing for Pumas. In 2001, he moved to Chivas and then joined Toluca in 2002. There he spent the most productive seasons of his career, moving into a three-man central midfield that also included Rafael García and playmaker Antonio Naelson. In his first season at the club, Toluca won the Apertura 2002 championship, and López scored in the final against Monarcas Morelia. He served as team captain in 2004 and won another championship in the Apertura 2005 campaign. In the following season López, a frequent scorer from free kicks, scored a career-high 6 goals. He joined Cruz Azul in 2006 before returning to Toluca for the Clausura 2008 season; he won the Apertura 2008 title, his third, with Toluca, but by now played less frequently. López departed Toluca in 2010 and spent his last top-flight seasons with Cruz Azul, Necaxa, Estudiantes Tecos, and Querétaro.

== International career ==
López also earned 26 caps for the Mexico national team. His first international match came on June 4, 2000, against Ireland in the U.S. Cup, playing in a squad filled mostly with fellow Pumas players. He returned to the team in 2003 on the strength of his performances with Toluca, appearing in four of Mexico's qualifying matches for the 2006 FIFA World Cup. López was on the preliminary list of players nominated for the World Cup squad, but he was one of three final cuts announced by coach Ricardo Antonio Lavolpe before the tournament. His final international match came against Ecuador in a 4–2 victory in Oakland, California on March 28, 2007.

He was part of the Mexico 2004 Olympic football team as an overage player that was eliminated in the first round, having finished third in group A behind group winners Mali and South Korea.

== Honours ==
Toluca

- Mexican Primera División: Apertura 2002, Apertura 2005, Apertura 2008
- Campeón de Campeones: 2003
- CONCACAF Champions' Cup: 2003
