= Hernán Cristante =

Argentine footballer and manager

Personal information
- Full name: Rolando Hernán Cristante Mandarino
- Date of birth: 16 September 1969 (age 57)
- Place of birth: La Plata, Argentina
- Height: 1.80 m (5 ft 11 in)
- Position: Goalkeeper

Senior career*
Years	Team	Apps	(Gls)
1989–1993	Gimnasia de La Plata	58	(0)
1993–2010	Toluca	419	(1)
1994–1995	→ Platense (loan)	30	(0)
1996–1997	→ Newell's Old Boys (loan)	17	(0)
1997–1998	→ Huracán (loan)	32	(0)
2011–2012	U. de G.	27	(0)
Total		583	(1)

International career
1989–1995	Argentina	6	(0)

Managerial career
- 2016: Tepic
- 2016–2019: Toluca
- 2021: Toluca
- 2022: Querétaro
- 2022–2023: Juárez
- 2025: Puebla
- * Club domestic league appearances and goals

Rolando Hernán Cristante Mandarino (born 16 September 1969) is an Argentine football manager and former goalkeeper who spent most of his playing career at Mexican club Toluca, winning multiple titles across nearly two decades.

== Club career ==
Cristante began his professional career with Gimnasia y Esgrima La Plata in Argentina, where he showed early promise before moving to Mexico in 1993 to join Toluca.

Though he had loan spells back in Argentina with Platense, Newell's Old Boys, and Huracán, it was in Toluca where he made his name. He became one of the most iconic goalkeepers in the history of Mexico's top division, making more than 400 appearances and helping Toluca secure five Primera División titles and a CONCACAF Champions Cup.

He holds the league record of 772 consecutive minutes without conceding a goal.

After retiring as a player in 2012 following a final season with Leones Negros, Cristante transitioned into coaching. His managerial career includes spells with Toluca, Querétaro, Juárez, and most recently Puebla.

== International career ==
Cristante represented the Argentina national team between 1989 and 1995, and was included in the squad for the 1995 Copa América. In total, he earned six caps for his country.

== Honours ==
=== Player ===
Gimnasia y Esgrima

- Copa Centenario de la AFA: 1993

Toluca

- Primera División de México: Verano 1999, Verano 2000, Apertura 2002, Apertura 2005, Apertura 2008
- Campeón de Campeones: 2003, 2006
- CONCACAF Champions' Cup: 2003
