= List of Mexican football transfers summer 2010 =

This is a list of Mexican football transfers in the Mexican Primera Division during the summer 2010 transfer window, grouped by club. Football has been played professionally in Mexico since the early 1900s. Since 1996, the country has played two split seasons instead of a traditional long season. There are two separate playoff and league divisions. After many years of calling the regular seasons as "Verano" (Summer) and "Invierno" (Winter); the Primera División de México (Mexican First League Division) have changed the names of the competition, and has opted for "Apertura" (opening) and "Clausura" (closing) events. The Apertura division begins in the middle of Mexico's summer and ends before the official start of winter. The Clausura division begins during the New Year, and concludes in the spring season.

== Mexican Primera Division ==
=== America ===
In: Note: Flags indicate national team as defined under FIFA eligibility rules; some limited exceptions apply. Players may hold more than one non-FIFA nationality.

No.	Pos.	Nation	Player
11	FW	URU	Vicente Sanchez (from (Germany) FC Schalke 04, free transfer)
19	MF	MEX	Miguel Layún (from (Italy) Atalanta, free transfer)
5	MF	BRA	Rosinei (from (Spain) Real Murcia)
30	FW	MEX	Vicente Matías Vuoso (from Santos)
16	DF	MEX	Diego Cervantes (from Monterrey, loan return)
22	DF	MEX	Leonín Pineda (from Tijuana, loan return)

Out: Note: Flags indicate national team as defined under FIFA eligibility rules; some limited exceptions apply. Players may hold more than one non-FIFA nationality.

No.	Pos.	Nation	Player
—	MF	ARG	Federico Insúa (to (Turkey) Bursaspor)
—	FW	CHI	Jean Beausejour (to (England) Birmingham City)
—	DF	ARG	Fernando Ortiz (to (Argentina) Velez, free transfer)
—	MF	PAR	Enrique Vera (to Atlas)
—	MF	USA	Edgar Castillo (to San Luis, on loan)
—	MF	MEX	Alejandro Argüello (to Tigres, on loan)
—	MF	MEX	Juan Carlos Medina (to San Luis, on loan)
—	DF	MEX	Manuel Alejandro García (to San Luis, on loan)
—	DF	MEX	Lampros Kontogiannis (to Albinegros, on loan)
—	DF	MEX	Fernando López (to Necaxa, end of loan)
—	DF	MEX	Carlos Alberto Sánchez (retired)

=== Atlante ===
In: Note: Flags indicate national team as defined under FIFA eligibility rules; some limited exceptions apply. Players may hold more than one non-FIFA nationality.

No.	Pos.	Nation	Player
2	MF	PAR	Líder Mármol (from (Argentina) San Martín)
19	MF	ARG	Nicolás Torres (from (Argentina) Colón)
13	MF	URU	Mathías Cardaccio (from (Italy) Milan)
16	MF	USA	Sonny Guadarrama (from Mérida)
9	FW	MEX	Ulises Mendivil (from Pachuca)
1	GK	MEX	Antonio Pérez (from León)
26	GK	MEX	Eder Patiño (from León)
27	MF	MEX	Hugo Emiliano Rodríguez (from León)
30	GK	MEX	Moisés Muñoz (from Morelia)
29	FW	MEX	Luis Ángel Landín (from Morelia, on loan)
8	MF	MEX	Alex Diego (from UNAM, on loan)
6	MF	MEX	Edgar Solís (from Guadalajara, on loan)
24	DF	MEX	Pedro Beltrán (from Morelia, on loan)
5	DF	MEX	Óscar Recio (from Morelia, on loan)

Out: Note: Flags indicate national team as defined under FIFA eligibility rules; some limited exceptions apply. Players may hold more than one non-FIFA nationality.

No.	Pos.	Nation	Player
—	MF	VEN	Giancarlo Maldonado (to (United States) Chivas USA, on loan)
—	DF	MEX	Yamet Asael Pérez (to Alacranes de Durango, on loan)
—	DF	MEX	Oscar Pelayo (to La Piedad, on loan)
—	FW	MEX	Martín Calderón (to Dorados de Sinaloa, on loan)
—	MF	MEX	Tomás Domínguez (to Alacranes de Durango, on loan)
—	MF	MEX	Raymundo Torres (to Alacranes de Durango, on loan)
—	MF	MEX	José Joel González (to Puebla, on loan)
—	GK	MEX	Gerardo Daniel Ruiz (to Jaguares, on loan)
—	DF	ARG	Miguel Ángel Martínez (to Jaguares, on loan)
—	MF	ARG	Gabriel Pereyra (to Puebla, on loan)
—	FW	MEX	Guillermo Rojas (to Veracruz, end of loan)
—	GK	ARG	Federico Vilar (to Morelia)
—	FW	MEX	Daniel Arreola (to Pachuca)

=== Atlas ===
In: Note: Flags indicate national team as defined under FIFA eligibility rules; some limited exceptions apply. Players may hold more than one non-FIFA nationality.

No.	Pos.	Nation	Player
8	MF	COL	Michael Ortega (from (Colombia) Cali)
13	MF	PAR	Enrique Vera (from América)
24	FW	ARG	Jorge Achucarro (from (Argentina) Newell, loan return)
15	DF	MEX	Gerardo Flores (from Jaguares, loan return)
24	MF	MEX	Gregorio Torres (from Jaguares, loan return)
12	GK	MEX	Pedro Hernández (from Necaxa, loan return)
10	FW	ARG	Alfredo Moreno (from San Luis, on loan)

Out: Note: Flags indicate national team as defined under FIFA eligibility rules; some limited exceptions apply. Players may hold more than one non-FIFA nationality.

No.	Pos.	Nation	Player
—	GK	ARG	Mariano Barbosa (to (Spain) Las Palmas)
—	DF	MEX	Eduardo Rergis (to (Argentina) Cordoba, free transfer)
—	FW	BRA	Rômulo (to (Brazil) Guarani, free transfer)
—	MF	MEX	Jorge Torres Nilo (to Tigres)
—	DF	MEX	Hugo Ayala (to Tigres)
—	MF	COL	Andrés Chitiva (to Veracruz)
—	MF	MEX	Juan Manuel García (to Veracruz)
—	MF	MEX	Jorge Hernández (to Veracruz)
—	MF	MEX	Miguel Zepeda (to Leones Negros, free transfer)
—	FW	ARG	Emanuel Centurión (to U. de Chile, on loan)
—	MF	ARG	Darío Bottinelli (to (Chile) CDUC, on loan)
—	FW	URU	Gonzalo Vargas (to (Argentina) Argentinos Juniors, on loan)
—	DF	MEX	Christian Sánchez (to San Luis, on loan)
—	MF	MEX	Carlos Balcázar (to Leones Negros, on loan)
—	MF	MEX	Jonathan Piña (to Leones Negros, on loan)
—	MF	MEX	Óscar Vera (to Leones Negros, on loan)
—	MF	MEX	Luis Fernando Guevara (to La Piedad, on loan)
—	FW	MEX	Mario Méndez (to Toluca, end of loan)
—	MF	MEX	Mario Pérez (released)

=== Chiapas ===
In: Note: Flags indicate national team as defined under FIFA eligibility rules; some limited exceptions apply. Players may hold more than one non-FIFA nationality.

No.	Pos.	Nation	Player
13	MF	URU	Jorge Rodríguez (from (Uruguay) River Plate)
4	MF	CHI	Ismael Fuentes (from (Chile) CDUC, loan return)
-	MF	ARG	Neri Cardozo (from Monterrey, loan return)
12	GK	MEX	Fabián Villaseñor (from Tecos, loan return)
28	DF	MEX	Marvin Cabrera (from Morelia, on loan)
21	GK	MEX	Gerardo Daniel Ruiz (from Atlante, on loan)
27	DF	MEX	Jaime Durán (from Morelia, on loan)
11	FW	MEX	Carlos Ochoa (from Santos, on loan)
17	MF	MEX	Luis Ricardo Esqueda (from Indios, on loan)
2	DF	ARG	Miguel Ángel Martínez (from Atlante, on loan)

Out: Note: Flags indicate national team as defined under FIFA eligibility rules; some limited exceptions apply. Players may hold more than one non-FIFA nationality.

No.	Pos.	Nation	Player
—	MF	MEX	Alejandro Corona (to León)
—	DF	MEX	Christian Armas (to (Guatemala) P. La Mesilla)
—	DF	CHI	Cristián Álvarez (to (Israel) B. Jerusalem, end of loan)
—	FW	MEX	Antonio Salazar (to Guadalajara, end of loan)
—	MF	MEX	Edgar Andrade (to Cruz Azul, end of loan)
—	DF	MEX	Gerardo Flores (to Atlas, end of loan)
—	DF	MEX	Diego Ordaz (to Monterrey, end of loan)
—	FW	MEX	Ezequiel Orozco (to Necaxa, end of loan)
—	DF	MEX	Leonardo Casanova (to Estudiantes de Altamira, on loan)
—	FW	MEX	Francisco Serrano (to Deportivo Real Irapuato, on loan)
—	DF	ARG	Javier Gandolfi (to Tijuana, on loan)
—	MF	MEX	José de Jesús Gutiérrez (to Tijuana, on loan)
—	MF	MEX	Gilberto Mora (to Tijuana, on loan)
—	GK	MEX	Humberto Martínez (to Correcaminos, on loan)
—	GK	MEX	Edgar Hernández (to Puebla, on loan)

=== Cruz Azul ===
In: Note: Flags indicate national team as defined under FIFA eligibility rules; some limited exceptions apply. Players may hold more than one non-FIFA nationality.

No.	Pos.	Nation	Player
-	MF	CHI	Emilio Hernández (from (Argentina) Argentinos Juniors, loan return)
-	FW	PAR	Pablo Zeballos (from (Argentina) Porteño, loan return)
-	MF	MEX	Edgar Andrade (from Jaguares, loan return)
-	GK	MEX	Óscar Pérez (from Necaxa, loan return)
-	MF	MEX	Gonzalo Pineda (from Guadalajara, on loan)

Out: Note: Flags indicate national team as defined under FIFA eligibility rules; some limited exceptions apply. Players may hold more than one non-FIFA nationality.

No.	Pos.	Nation	Player
—	MF	PAR	Cristian Riveros (to (England) Sunderland, free transfer)
—	DF	BRA	Edcarlos (to (Brazil) Cruzeiro, on loan)
—	MF	MEX	Israel López (to Necaxa, on loan)
—	MF	MEX	Jaime Lozano (to Morelia, on loan)
—	FW	MEX	Mario Ortiz (to Puebla, on loan)
—	MF	MEX	Gabino Velasco (to Querétaro, on loan)
—	MF	MEX	Edgar Lugo (to Puebla, on loan)

=== Guadalajara ===
In: Note: Flags indicate national team as defined under FIFA eligibility rules; some limited exceptions apply. Players may hold more than one non-FIFA nationality.

No.	Pos.	Nation	Player
16	DF	MEX	Miguel Ángel Ponce (from Deportivo Guadalajara II)
33	GK	MEX	Sergio Arias (from Deportivo Guadalajara II)
58	FW	MEX	Ricardo Michel Vázquez (from Deportivo Guadalajara II)
31	MF	MEX	Mitchel Oviedo (from Deportivo Deportivo Guadalajara II)
44	MF	MEX	Jesús Enrique Sánchez (from Deportivo Guadalajara II)
-	FW	MEX	Jesús Padilla (from (United States) Chivas USA, loan return)
3	MF	MEX	Dionicio Escalante (to D. de Sinaloa)
-	FW	MEX	Antonio Salazar (from Jaguares, loan return)
-	DF	MEX	José Antonio Olvera (from Santos, loan return)
17	FW	MEX	Omar Bravo (from (United States) K. City Wizards, on loan)

Out: Note: Flags indicate national team as defined under FIFA eligibility rules; some limited exceptions apply. Players may hold more than one non-FIFA nationality.

No.	Pos.	Nation	Player
—	FW	MEX	Javier Hernández (to (England) Manchester United)
—	FW	MEX	Omar Bravo (to (United States) K. City Wizards)
—	GK	MEX	Sergio Rodríguez (to Deportivo Guadalajara II)
—	MF	MEX	Max Pérez (to Deportivo Guadalajara II)
—	GK	MEX	Sergio Alejandro García (to Estudiantes de Altamira, on loan)
—	DF	MEX	José Antonio Patlán (to Indios, on loan)
—	DF	MEX	Diego Martínez (to Veracruz, on loan)
—	MF	MEX	Marco Parra (to La Piedad, on loan)
—	FW	MEX	Julio Nava (to Querétaro, on loan)
—	MF	MEX	Edgar Solís (to Atlante, on loan)
—	MF	MEX	Sergio Amaury Ponce (to San Luis, on loan)
—	MF	MEX	Gonzalo Pineda (to Cruz Azul, on loan)
—	MF	MEX	Aarón Galindo (to Deportivo Guadalajara II)

=== Monterrey ===
In: Note: Flags indicate national team as defined under FIFA eligibility rules; some limited exceptions apply. Players may hold more than one non-FIFA nationality.

No.	Pos.	Nation	Player
4	DF	MEX	Ricardo Osorio (from (Germany) VfB Stuttgart, free transfer)
26	FW	CHI	Humberto Suazo (from (Spain) R. Zaragoza, loan return)
-	FW	BRA	Robert (from (Brazil) Cruzeiro, loan return)
-	MF	MEX	Manuel Pérez Flores (from Toluca, loan return)
-	DF	MEX	Diego Ordaz (from Jaguares, loan return)
3	DF	MEX	Pierre Ibarra (from Necaxa)

Out: Note: Flags indicate national team as defined under FIFA eligibility rules; some limited exceptions apply. Players may hold more than one non-FIFA nationality.

No.	Pos.	Nation	Player
—	MF	URU	Egidio Arévalo (to (Uruguay) Peñarol)
—	FW	BRA	Val Baiano (to (Brazil) Flamengo, free transfer)
—	MF	ARG	Neri Cardozo (to Jaguares, loan return)
—	DF	MEX	Diego Alberto Cervantes (to America, loan return)
—	DF	MEX	David Stringel (to Altamira, on loan)
—	MF	MEX	Arturo Alvarado (to Irapuato, on loan)
—	DF	MEX	Óscar Recio (to Atlante, on loan)
—	DF	MEX	Tomás Alejandro Banda (to Durango, on loan)
—	FW	MEX	Alejandro Molina (to Tijuana, on loan)
—	GK	MEX	Christian Martínez (from Tecos, on loan)
—	DF	MEX	Joel Morales (from Tecos, on loan)

=== Morelia ===
In: Note: Flags indicate national team as defined under FIFA eligibility rules; some limited exceptions apply. Players may hold more than one non-FIFA nationality.

No.	Pos.	Nation	Player
3	GK	ARG	Federico Vilar (from Atlante)
14	MF	MEX	Luis Miguel Noriega (from Puebla)
24	DF	MEX	José Manuel Cruzalta (from Toluca, on loan)
5	DF	MEX	Adrián Israel García (from San Luis, on loan)
21	MF	MEX	Jaime Lozano (from Cruz Azul, on loan)
7	FW	MEX	Rafael Márquez Lugo (from Atlante, on loan)
-	MF	MEX	Jesús Urbina (from Tigres, on loan)
-	DF	MEX	Omar Trujillo (from Tigres, loan return)

Out: Note: Flags indicate national team as defined under FIFA eligibility rules; some limited exceptions apply. Players may hold more than one non-FIFA nationality.

No.	Pos.	Nation	Player
—	FW	MEX	Jared Borgetti (to Leon)
—	GK	MEX	Moisés Muñoz (to Atlante)
—	MF	MEX	Jesus Castillo (to Merida)
—	DF	MEX	Eder Morales (to Merida)
—	MF	MEX	Mario Antonio Moreno (to Merida)
—	FW	MEX	Luis Ángel Landín (to Atlante, on loan)
—	MF	MEX	Ignacio Carrasco (to Atlante, on loan)
—	DF	MEX	Pedro Beltrán (to Atlante, on loan)
—	MF	MEX	Óscar Emilio Rojas (to Atlante, on loan)
—	FW	MEX	Ever Guzmán (to Veracruz, on loan)
—	DF	MEX	Omar Trujillo (to Tigres, on loan)
—	DF	MEX	Marvin Cabrera (to Jaguares, on loan)
—	DF	MEX	Jaime Durán (to Jaguares, on loan)

=== Necaxa ===
In: Note: Flags indicate national team as defined under FIFA eligibility rules; some limited exceptions apply. Players may hold more than one non-FIFA nationality.

No.	Pos.	Nation	Player
14	FW	ARG	Darío Gandín (from (Argentina) Independiente)
9	FW	ARG	Nicolás Pavlovich (from (Argentina) Argentinos Juniors, free transfer)
-	GK	MEX	Óscar Pérez (from Cruz Azul, on loan)
5	MF	MEX	Israel López (from Cruz Azul, on loan)
20	FW	MEX	Ismael Íñiguez (from UNAM, on loan)
16	GK	MEX	Alfonso Blanco (from Pachuca, on loan)
16	FW	MEX	Ezequiel Orozco (from Jaguares, loan return)
18	DF	MEX	Fernando López (from América, loan return)
17	MF	MEX	Jesús Palacios (from San Luis, loan return)

Out: Note: Flags indicate national team as defined under FIFA eligibility rules; some limited exceptions apply. Players may hold more than one non-FIFA nationality.

No.	Pos.	Nation	Player
—	GK	MEX	Jorge Bernal (to Veracruz)
—	DF	MEX	Omar Maldonado (to Durango, on loan)
—	DF	MEX	Alejandro Sosa (to Durango, on loan)
—	MF	MEX	Oscar Zea (to Altamira, on loan)
—	MF	MEX	Jose Luis López (to Irapuato, on loan)
—	FW	MEX	Luis Alberto Valdés (to Irapuato, on loan)
—	MF	MEX	Gerardo Galindo (to Tijuana, on loan)
—	DF	MEX	Luis Omar Hernández (to San Luis, on loan)
—	GK	MEX	Óscar Pérez (to Cruz Azul, loan return)
—	DF	MEX	Pierre Ibarra (to Monterrey, loan return)
—	DF	MEX	Pedro Hernández (to Atlas, loan return)

=== Pachuca ===
In: Note: Flags indicate national team as defined under FIFA eligibility rules; some limited exceptions apply. Players may hold more than one non-FIFA nationality.

No.	Pos.	Nation	Player
25	FW	COL	Franco Arizala (from (Colombia) Tolima)
9	FW	USA	Herculez Gomez (from Puebla)
11	FW	MEX	Herculez Gomez (from San Luis)
14	FW	MEX	Daniel Arreola (from Atlante)
9	MF	USA	Marco Vidal (from Indios, on loan)

Out: Note: Flags indicate national team as defined under FIFA eligibility rules; some limited exceptions apply. Players may hold more than one non-FIFA nationality.

No.	Pos.	Nation	Player
—	MF	ARG	Damián Álvarez (to Tigres)
—	MF	MEX	Jaime Correa (to San Luis)
—	FW	MEX	Ulises Mendivil (to Atlante)
—	GK	MEX	Alfonso Blanco (to Necaxa, on loan)
—	FW	MEX	Rafael Márquez (to Morelia, on loan)
—	FW	ARG	Darío Cvitanich (to (Netherlands) Ajax, loan return)
—	MF	MEX	Gregorio Torres (to Atlas, loan return)
—	FW	MEX	Juan Carlos Cacho (to UNAM, loan return)

=== Puebla ===
In: Note: Flags indicate national team as defined under FIFA eligibility rules; some limited exceptions apply. Players may hold more than one non-FIFA nationality.

No.	Pos.	Nation	Player
10	MF	URU	Nicolás Olivera (from Veracruz)
1	GK	MEX	Edgar Hernández (from Jaguares, on loan)
14	MF	MEX	Yasser Corona (from Merida, on loan)
7	MF	MEX	José Joel González (from Atlante, on loan)
8	FW	ARG	Gabriel Pereyra (from Atlante, on loan)
31	DF	MEX	Melvin Brown (from Tecos, on loan)
9	DF	MEX	Mario Ortiz (from Cruz Azul, on loan)
11	DF	MEX	Edgar Lugo (from Cruz Azul, on loan)

Out: Note: Flags indicate national team as defined under FIFA eligibility rules; some limited exceptions apply. Players may hold more than one non-FIFA nationality.

No.	Pos.	Nation	Player
—	FW	GUA	Carlos Ruiz (to (Greece) Aris FC)
—	FW	USA	Herculez Gomez (to Pachuca)
—	MF	MEX	Luis Miguel Noriega (to Morelia)
—	MF	MEX	Hiber Ruíz (to Veracruz)
—	MF	MEX	Manuel López Mondragón (to Veracruz)
—	GK	MEX	Jorge Villalpando (to Jaguares, on loan)
—	MF	MEX	Hugo Ruíz (to Lobos, on loan)
—	FW	MEX	Eder Pacheco (to Durango, on loan)
—	FW	MEX	Íñigo Rey (to Durango, on loan)
—	MF	MEX	Sergio Rosas (to Tijuana, on loan)
—	FW	MEX	Carlos Arenas (to Guerreros, on loan)
—	MF	URU	Nicolás Vigneri (released)
—	FW	MEX	Marco Capetillo (retired)

=== Querétaro ===
In: Note: Flags indicate national team as defined under FIFA eligibility rules; some limited exceptions apply. Players may hold more than one non-FIFA nationality.

No.	Pos.	Nation	Player
5	DF	MEX	Éder Borelli (from (Argentina) Nueva Chicago)
27	FW	MEX	Ricardo Balderas (from (Uruguay) Cerro Largo)
16	MF	URU	Sergio Órteman (from (Uruguay) Peñarol)
10	FW	URU	Sergio Blanco (from (Uruguay) Nacional)
9	FW	BIH	Alen Škoro (from (Bosnia and Herzegovina) Sarajevo)
9	FW	MEX	Julio Nava (from Guadalajara, on loan)
17	MF	MEX	Gabino Velasco (from Cruz Azul, on loan)
25	MF	MEX	Jorge Cárdenas (from Guadalajara II, on loan)
17	FW	URU	Ignacio Schneider (from (Uruguay) CA Atenas, loan return)

Out: Note: Flags indicate national team as defined under FIFA eligibility rules; some limited exceptions apply. Players may hold more than one non-FIFA nationality.

No.	Pos.	Nation	Player
—	FW	ARG	Javier Elizondo (to (Chile) Huachipato)
—	MF	MEX	Germán Villa (to Irapuato)
—	DF	MEX	Joel Sanchez (to Veracruz, on loan)
—	DF	MEX	Margarito González (to Irapuato, on loan)
—	MF	ARG	Esteban Alberto González (to Irapuato, on loan)
—	MF	MEX	Fabián Mares (to Merida, on loan)
—	MF	MEX	Víctor Manuel Estrada (to Leones Negros, on loan)
—	FW	MEX	Álvaro Armando Estrada (to Leones Negros, on loan)
—	MF	MEX	Marco Antonio Jiménez (to Leones Negros, on loan)
—	DF	MEX	Héctor Castro (to Leones Negros, on loan)

=== San Luis ===
In: Note: Flags indicate national team as defined under FIFA eligibility rules; some limited exceptions apply. Players may hold more than one non-FIFA nationality.

No.	Pos.	Nation	Player
2	DF	ARG	Aníbal Matellán (from (Argentina) Arsenal)
7	FW	ECU	Michael Arroyo (from (Ecuador) Quito)
15	FW	PER	Wilmer Aguirre (from (Peru) A. Lima)
17	DF	MEX	Daniel Alcántar (from Tecos)
6	MF	MEX	Jaime Correa (from Pachuca)
27	FW	MEX	Othoniel Arce (from Guamúchil)
23	MF	MEX	Jesús Antonio Isijara (from Albinegros)
15	MF	USA	Edgar Castillo (from America, on loan)
8	MF	MEX	Juan Carlos Medina (from America, on loan)
22	DF	MEX	Manuel Alejandro García (from America, on loan)
4	DF	MEX	Christian Sanchez (from Atlas, on loan)
13	DF	MEX	Luis Omar Hernández (from Necaxa, on loan)
20	MF	MEX	Osmar Mares (from Santos, on loan)
13	GK	MEX	César Lozano (from Indios, on loan)
16	MF	MEX	Sergio Amaury Ponce (from Guadalajara, on loan)
28	FW	COL	Tressor Moreno (from (Colombia) Medellin, loan return)

Out: Note: Flags indicate national team as defined under FIFA eligibility rules; some limited exceptions apply. Players may hold more than one non-FIFA nationality.

No.	Pos.	Nation	Player
—	MF	ARG	Eduardo Coudet (to (United States) Philadelphia, free transfer)
—	GK	MEX	Adrián Martínez (to Irapuato, free transfer)
—	MF	MEX	Rodolfo Salinas (to Santos)
—	FW	MEX	José Rodolfo Reyes (to Santos)
—	MF	MEX	Braulio Luna (to Pachuca)
—	DF	PAR	Pablo César Aguilar (to (Argentina) Arsenal, on loan)
—	FW	ARG	Alfredo Moreno (to Atlas, on loan)
—	GK	URU	Hector Gimenez (to Guerreros, on loan)
—	DF	MEX	Omar Monjaraz (to Lobos, on loan)
—	DF	MEX	Armando Vallejo (to Veracruz, on loan)
—	DF	MEX	Oscar Mascorro (to Veracruz, on loan)
—	GK	MEX	Edmundo Ríos (to Durango, on loan)
—	DF	MEX	Adrián Israel García (to Morelia, on loan)
—	DF	MEX	Edwin Hernández (to Indios, loan return)
—	MF	MEX	Jesús Palacios (to Necaxa, loan return)
—	MF	MEX	Diego de la Torre (to Toluca, loan return)

=== Santos Laguna ===
In: Note: Flags indicate national team as defined under FIFA eligibility rules; some limited exceptions apply. Players may hold more than one non-FIFA nationality.

No.	Pos.	Nation	Player
9	MF	CHI	Rodrigo Ruiz (from Tecos)
13	FW	MEX	José Rodolfo Reyes (from San Luis)
17	MF	MEX	Rodolfo Salinas (from San Luis)
11	FW	ECU	Christian Benítez (from (England) Birmingham, loan return)
-	MF	ECU	Pedro Quiñónez (from (Ecuador) Emelec, loan return)

Out: Note: Flags indicate national team as defined under FIFA eligibility rules; some limited exceptions apply. Players may hold more than one non-FIFA nationality.

No.	Pos.	Nation	Player
—	MF	ARG	Walter Jiménez (to (Argentina) Gimnasia LP)
—	FW	MEX	Vicente Matías Vuoso (to America)
—	DF	MEX	Jorge Barrera (to La Piedad, on loan)
—	GK	MEX	Milton Aguilar (to Durango, on loan)
—	DF	MEX	Osmar Mares (to San Luis, on loan)
—	DF	MEX	Jorge Alberto Campos (to Albinegros, on loan)
—	FW	MEX	Agustín Enrique Herrera (to Mérida, on loan)
—	FW	MEX	Carlos Ochoa (to Jaguares, on loan)
—	FW	MEX	Joaquín Reyes (to Veracruz, on loan)
—	DF	MEX	José Antonio Olvera (to Guadalajara, loan return)

=== Toluca ===
In: Note: Flags indicate national team as defined under FIFA eligibility rules; some limited exceptions apply. Players may hold more than one non-FIFA nationality.

No.	Pos.	Nation	Player
2	DF	ARG	Diego Novaretti (from (Argentina) Belgrano)
21	FW	ARG	Juan Cuevas (from (Argentina) Gimnasia LP)
17	FW	MEX	Arturo Tapia (from Mexiquense)
22	FW	MEX	Emmanuel Cerda (from Tigres, on loan)
29	DF	MEX	Mario Mendez (from Atlas, loan return)
-	MF	MEX	Diego de la Torre (from San Luis, loan return)

Out: Note: Flags indicate national team as defined under FIFA eligibility rules; some limited exceptions apply. Players may hold more than one non-FIFA nationality.

No.	Pos.	Nation	Player
—	FW	MEX	Edgar González (to Altamira, on loan)
—	MF	MEX	Josué Castillejos (to Altamira, on loan)
—	MF	MEX	Francisco González (to Altamira, on loan)
—	DF	MEX	Octavio Mira (to Altamira, on loan)
—	DF	MEX	Miguel Almazán (to Tijuana, on loan)
—	FW	MEX	Ismael Valadéz (to Correcaminos, on loan)
—	FW	MEX	Manuel Zarate (to La Piedad, on loan)
—	DF	MEX	José Manuel Cruzalta (to Morelia, on loan)
—	MF	MEX	Manuel Perez (to Monterrey, loan return)
—	MF	COL	Vladimir Marín (to (Paraguay) Libertad, loan return)
—	GK	ARG	Hernán Cristante (released)

=== Estudiantes Tecos ===
In: Note: Flags indicate national team as defined under FIFA eligibility rules; some limited exceptions apply. Players may hold more than one non-FIFA nationality.

No.	Pos.	Nation	Player
14	MF	ARG	Rubens Sambueza (from (Argentina) River Plate)
11	MF	MEX	Ramón Morales (free agent)
4	DF	ARG	Gustavo Cabral (from (Argentina) River Plate, on loan)
8	GK	MEX	Christian Martínez (from Monterrey, on loan)
7	DF	MEX	Joel Morales (from Monterrey, on loan)
-	FW	MEX	Emmanuel Gaytán (from Acapulco, loan return)

Out: Note: Flags indicate national team as defined under FIFA eligibility rules; some limited exceptions apply. Players may hold more than one non-FIFA nationality.

No.	Pos.	Nation	Player
—	MF	CHI	Roberto Gutiérrez (to (Chile) CDUC)
—	MF	CHI	Rodrigo Ruiz (to Santos)
—	MF	MEX	Daniel Alcántar (to San Luis)
—	MF	MEX	Eder Mishel Urieta (to La Piedad, on loan)
—	GK	MEX	José Guadalupe Martínez (to Leones Negros, on loan)
—	DF	MEX	Melvin Brown (to Puebla, on loan)
—	GK	MEX	Fabián Villaseñor (to Jaguares, loan return)

=== UANL ===
In: Note: Flags indicate national team as defined under FIFA eligibility rules; some limited exceptions apply. Players may hold more than one non-FIFA nationality.

No.	Pos.	Nation	Player
3	DF	BRA	Juninho (from (Brazil) Botafogo)
4	DF	MEX	Hugo Ayala (from Atlas)
6	MF	MEX	Jorge Torres Nilo (from Atlas)
11	MF	ARG	Damian Alvarez (from Pachuca)
20	MF	MEX	Alejandro Argüello (from America, on loan)
—	DF	MEX	Omar Trujillo (from Morelia, on loan)
-	DF	MEX	Sindey Balderas (from Indios, loan return)

Out: Note: Flags indicate national team as defined under FIFA eligibility rules; some limited exceptions apply. Players may hold more than one non-FIFA nationality.

No.	Pos.	Nation	Player
—	DF	PAR	Pedro Benítez (to (Paraguay) Porteño)
—	MF	BRA	Paulo Nagamura (to (United States) Chivas USA)
—	FW	MEX	Mauricio Romero Alvizu (from Veracruz)
—	MF	MEX	Juan Pablo García (to Veracruz)
—	DF	MEX	Enrique Escudero (to Veracruz, on loan)
—	FW	MEX	Emmanuel Cerda (to Toluca, on loan)
—	DF	MEX	Jesús Urbina (to Morelia, on loan)
—	MF	MEX	Félix Ángel Ayala (to Tijuana, on loan)
—	MF	PAN	Blas Pérez (to Leon, on loan)
—	DF	MEX	Omar Trujillo (to Morelia, loan return)
—	DF	ARG	Fernando Ortiz (to America, loan return)
—	DF	MEX	Sindey Balderas (retired)

=== UNAM ===
In: Note: Flags indicate national team as defined under FIFA eligibility rules; some limited exceptions apply. Players may hold more than one non-FIFA nationality.

No.	Pos.	Nation	Player
11	FW	MEX	Juan Carlos Cacho (from Pachuca, loan return)

Out: Note: Flags indicate national team as defined under FIFA eligibility rules; some limited exceptions apply. Players may hold more than one non-FIFA nationality.

No.	Pos.	Nation	Player
—	MF	MEX	Efraín Juárez (to (Scotland) Celtic)
—	MF	MEX	Pablo Barrera (to (England) West Ham United)
—	DF	MEX	Salvador Medina (to Pumas Morelos)
—	MF	MEX	José Alejandro Aguilar (to Veracruz)
—	FW	MEX	Ismael Íñiguez (to Necaxa, on loan)
—	MF	MEX	Alex Diego (to Atlante, on loan)
—	MF	MEX	Odin Patiño (to Leon, on loan)

== See also ==
- 2010–11 Primera División de México season
