= 2011–12 San Luis F.C. season =

San Luis
2011–12 season
- Chairman: Eduardo del Villar Cervantes
- Manager: Ignacio Ambríz (until Nov., 2011); René Isidoro García (Nov., 2011–Feb. 2012); Sergio Bueno (from Feb. 2012)
- Stadium: Estadio Alfonso Lastras
- Apertura 2011: 10th
- Clausura 2012: 16th
- Top goalscorer: League: Apertura: Alfredo Moreno (7); Clausura: Alfredo Moreno (5); All: Alfredo Moreno (12)
| Home colours | Away colours | Third colours |

The 2011–12 San Luis season was the 65th professional season of Mexico's top-flight football league. The season is split into two tournaments—the Torneo Apertura and the Torneo Clausura—each with identical formats and each contested by the same eighteen teams. San Luis began their season on July 23, 2011, against UNAM, San Luis play their homes games on Saturdays at 8:45pm local time.

== Torneo Apertura ==
=== Squad ===
Note: Flags indicate national team as defined under FIFA eligibility rules; some limited exceptions apply. Players may hold more than one non-FIFA nationality.

| No. | Pos. | Nation | Player |
|---|---|---|---|
| 1 | GK | MEX | Óscar Pérez |
| 2 | DF | ARG | Aníbal Matellán (Captain 2) |
| 3 | DF | MEX | Juan Carlos de la Barrera |
| 4 | DF | MEX | Christian Sánchez |
| 5 | MF | MEX | José Joel González |
| 6 | MF | MEX | Jaime Correa (Captain) |
| 7 | MF | MEX | Ignacio Torres |
| 8 | MF | MEX | Jehu Chiapas |
| 9 | FW | ECU | Michael Arroyo |
| 10 | FW | PER | Wilmer Aguirre |
| 11 | MF | COL | Macnelly Torres |
| 12 | GK | MEX | César Lozano |
| 13 | MF | MEX | Moisés Velasco |

| No. | Pos. | Nation | Player |
|---|---|---|---|
| 15 | MF | MEX | Fernando Morales |
| 16 | DF | USA | Michael Orozco |
| 17 | DF | MEX | Daniel Alcántar |
| 18 | DF | MEX | Isaí Arredondo |
| 19 | DF | MEX | Arturo Ruíz |
| 21 | FW | MEX | Jesús Moreno |
| 22 | DF | MEX | Guillermo Cerda |
| 23 | FW | ARG | Alfredo Moreno |
| 24 | DF | MEX | David Alcántar |
| 25 | GK | MEX | Gerson Rubén Marín |
| 26 | DF | MEX | Gabriel Rojo de la Vega |
| 27 | FW | MEX | Othoniel Arce |
| 28 | FW | ARG | Ismael Blanco |

=== Regular season ===
==== Apertura 2011 results ====
| July 23, 2011 Round 1 | UNAM | 2 – 0 | San Luis | Estadio Olímpico Universitario, Mexico City |
| 12:00 | Cacho 9'; Bravo 36'; Sandoval (yellow card) 36'; Herrera (yellow card) 39' | Report | Alcántar (yellow card) 34'; Orozco (yellow card) 39' | Referee: Ricardo Arellano |

| July 30, 2011 Round 2 | San Luis | 2 – 1 | Estudiantes Tecos | Estadio Alfonso Lastras, San Luis Potosí |
| 20:45 | González 12'; (yellow card) 13'; Alcántar (yellow card) 45'; Arroyo (yellow card) 83'; Aguirre 90+2' (pen.); Orozco (red card) 90+3' | Report | Gomez 50'; Pérez (yellow card) 64'; Colace (yellow card) 83'; Leaño (yellow card) 90' (red card) 90+3' | Referee: Marco Antonio Rodríguez |

| September 4, 2011 Round 3 | San Luis | 2 – 3 | Morelia | Estadio Alfonso Lastras, San Luis Potosí |
| 12:00 | Arroyo (yellow card) 17', (goal) 31' (pen.); Blanco 90+4' | Report | Huiqui (yellow card) 29'; Lozano 39', 77' (pen.); Silva (red card) 56' (was sent off warming up); Rojas 40'; Gastelúm (yellow card) 69'; Cabrera 87' | Referee: Fabricio Morales |

| September 14, 2011 Round 4 | América | 2 – 2 | San Luis | Estadio Azteca, Mexico City |
| 20:30 | Rosinei (yellow card) 5', (goal) 47'; Márquez (yellow card) 68', (goal) 80'; Reyna (yellow card) 75' | Report | Alcántar (yellow card) 1'; Torres (yellow card) 23'; Aguirre 31', 90'; González (yellow card) 47'; Matellán (yellow card) 78'; Sánchez (yellow card) 84' | Referee: Roberto García Orozco |

| August 13, 2011 Round 5 | San Luis | 1 – 0 | Monterrey | Estadio Alfonso Lastras, San Luis Potosí |
| 17:00 | Sánchez 11'; Matellán (yellow card) 62'; González (yellow card) 71'; Correa (yellow card) 82'; Alcántar (yellow card) 90+3' | Report | Paredes (yellow card) 65'; Delgado (yellow card) 75' | Referee: Mauricio Morales |

| August 20, 2011 Round 6 | UANL | 1 – 0 | San Luis | Estadio Universitario, San Nicolás |
| 19:00 | Torres Nilo (yellow card) 30'; Álvarez (yellow card) 41'; Jiménez 86'; Acuña 90+1' | Report | Arroyo (yellow card) 25'; Sánchez (yellow card) 25'; Matellán (red card) 60'; Moreno (yellow card) 60' (yellow-red card) 64'; Aguirre (yellow card) 73' | Referee: Miguel Ángel Flores |

| August 27, 2011 Round 7 | San Luis | 2 – 0 | Guadalajara | Estadio Alfonso Lastras, San Luis Potosí |
| 20:45 | Chiapas (yellow card) 11'; Aguirre (yellow card) 32'; Arroyo 54'; Torres 85'; Velasco (yellow card) 87' | | Reynoso (yellow card) 41'; Araujo (yellow card) 72'; Torres (yellow card) 89' | Referee: Erim Ramírez |

| September 10, 2011 Round 8 | Atlas | 1 – 1 | San Luis | Estadio Jalisco, Guadalajara |
| 20:45 | Ayala (yellow card) 25'; Romero 36' | Report | Ambríz (red card) 23' (manager); Torres (yellow card) 54'; Arroyo 58'; Chiapas (yellow card) 60'; Matellán (yellow card) 90+1' | Referee: Fernando Guerrero |

| September 17, 2011 Round 9 | San Luis | 0 – 1 | Santos Laguna | Estadio Alfonso Lastras, San Luis Potosí |
| 20:45 | Orozco (yellow card) 40'; Moreno (yellow card) 70' | Report | Ludueña 11'; Hoyos (yellow card) 29'; Estrada (yellow card) 34' | Referee: Jorge Antonio Pèrez |

| September 24, 2011 Round 10 | Pachuca | 1 – 1 | San Luis | Estadio Hidalgo, Pachuca |
| 19:00 | Cejas (yellow card) 12'; Castillo (yellow card) 26'; Esqueda 44' | Report | Matellán (yellow card) 10'; Arroyo 37'; Correa (yellow card) 58'; Pérez (yellow card) 87' | Referee: Jorge Isaac Rojas |

| October 1, 2011 Round 11 | San Luis | 2 – 1 | Puebla | Estadio Alfonso Lastras, San Luis Potosí |
| 20:45 | Matellán (yellow card) 29'; Arroyo (yellow card) 33'; González (yellow card) 54'; Torres (yellow card) 55'; Moreno 56'; Chiapas 75' | Report | Zamora (yellow card) 9'; Beasley 12'; Zamora (yellow card) 73'; Pereyra (yellow card) 87'; Álvarez (yellow card) 90+2' | Referee: José Alfredo Peñaloza |

| October 8, 2011 Round 12 | Atlante | 1 – 1 | San Luis | Estadio Quintana Roo, Cancún |
| 21:00 | Arredondo (yellow card) 19'; González (yellow card) 22'; Sánchez (yellow card) 52' (yellow-red card) 81'; Alcántar (yellow card) 69'; Cuevas 82' | Report | Amione (yellow card) 18'; Arce 47'; Martínez (yellow card) 73'; Torres (yellow card) 81'; Pérez (yellow card) 90+3' | Referee: Ricardo Arellano |

| October 15, 2011 Round 13 | San Luis | 1 – 1 | Cruz Azul | Estadio Alfonso Lastras, San Luis Potosí |
| 20:45 | Torres (yellow card) 27'; Matellán (yellow card) 36'; Moreno 55'; Chiapas (yellow card) 70' | Report | Perea 83' | Referee: Mauricio Morales |

| October 22, 2011 Round 14 | Chiapas | 3 – 1 | San Luis | Estadio Victor Manuel Reyna, Tuxtla Gutiérrez |
| 17:00 | J. Martínez 31', 43'; M. Martínez 66' | Report | de la Barrera (yellow card) 2'; Moreno (yellow card) 65', (goal) 77'; Torres (yellow card) 84' | Referee: Roberto García Orozco |

| October 26, 2011 Round 15 | San Luis | 2 – 1 | Querétaro | Estadio Alfonso Lastras, San Luis Potosí |
| 20:30 | Orozco (yellow card) 5'; I. Torres (yellow card) 56'; Moreno 57', 72'; Velasco (yellow card) 67' | Report | Bueno (yellow card) 5', (goal) 81' (pen.); Ponce (yellow card) 55'; Jiménez (yellow card) 66'; Mondragón (yellow card) 75' | Referee: Marco Antonio Rodríguez |

| October 30, 2011 Round 16 | Tijuana | 0 – 0 | San Luis | Estadio Caliente, Tijuana |
| 12:00 | Sand (yellow card) 51' (red card) 59' | Report | Alcántar (yellow card) 8'; Chiapas (yellow card) 51'; Orozco (yellow card) 88' | Referee: Paul Delgadillo |

| November 5, 2011 Round 17 | San Luis | 5 – 1 | Toluca | Estadio Alfonso Lastras, San Luis Potosí |
| 20:45 | González 4'; Moreno 12', 64' (pen.); Torres (yellow card) 38'; Blanco 60', (yellow card) 61'; Velasco (yellow card) 86'; Aguirre 90' | Report | M. de la Torre (yellow card) 1'; Sinha (yellow card) 38'; D. de la Torre (yellow card) 43'; Dueñas (yellow card) 59'; Alonso 84' | Referee: Fernando Guerrero |

San Luis did not qualify to the Final Phase

=== Goalscorers ===
| Position | Nation | Name | Goals scored |
|---|---|---|---|
| 1. | (Argentina) | Alfredo Moreno | 7 |
| 2. | (Peru) | Wilmer Aguirre | 4 |
| 2. | (Ecuador) | Michael Arroyo | 4 |
| 4. | (Argentina) | Ismael Blanco | 2 |
| 4. | (Mexico) | José Joel González | 2 |
| 6. | (Mexico) | Othoniel Arce | 1 |
| 6. | (Mexico) | Jehu Chiapas | 1 |
| 6. | (Mexico) | Christian Sánchez | 1 |
| 6. | (Colombia) | Macnelly Torres | 1 |
| TOTAL | | | 23 |

=== Results ===
==== Results summary ====
| Overall | | | | | | | | Home | | | | | | Away | | | | | |
| Pld | W | D | L | GF | GA | GD | Pts | W | D | L | GF | GA | GD | W | D | L | GF | GA | GD |
|---|---|---|---|---|---|---|---|---|---|---|---|---|---|---|---|---|---|---|---|
| 17 | 6 | 6 | 5 | 23 | 20 | +3 | 24 | 6 | 1 | 2 | 17 | 9 | +8 | 0 | 5 | 3 | 6 | 11 | −5 |

Last updated: 5 November 2011.
Source: Apertura 2010 results

==== Results by round ====
| Round | 1 | 2 | 3 | 4 | 5 | 6 | 7 | 8 | 9 | 10 | 11 | 12 | 13 | 14 | 15 | 16 | 17 |
|---|---|---|---|---|---|---|---|---|---|---|---|---|---|---|---|---|---|
| Ground | A | H | H | A | H | A | H | A | H | A | H | A | H | A | H | A | H |
| Result | L | W | L | D | W | L | W | D | L | D | W | D | D | L | W | D | W |
| Position | 16 | 10 | 15 | 14 | 10 | 14 | 8 | 9 | 14 | 15 | 10 | 10 | 10 | 14 | 10 | 12 | 10 |

Updated to match(es) played on 6 November 2011. Source: Apertura 2011 results and mediotiempo.com
A = Away; H = Home; W = Win; D = Draw; L = Loss

== Transfers ==
=== In ===
| # | Pos | Nat | Player | Age | From | Date | Notes |
|---|---|---|---|---|---|---|---|
| | DF | (Mexico) | William Paredes | 26 | Monterrey | November 25, 2011 | |
| | DF | (Mexico) | Diego Ordaz | 27 | Atlante | November 25, 2011 | |
| | MF | (Mexico) | César Villaluz | 23 | Cruz Azul | December 9, 2011 | |

=== Out ===
| # | Pos | Nat | Player | Age | To | Date | Notes |
|---|---|---|---|---|---|---|---|
| 27 | FW | (Mexico) | Othoniel Arce | 22 | Monterrey | November 25, 2011 | |
| 9 | MF | (Ecuador) | Michael Arroyo | 24 | Atlante | November 27, 2011 | |

== Torneo Clausura ==
=== Squad ===
Note: Flags indicate national team as defined under FIFA eligibility rules; some limited exceptions apply. Players may hold more than one non-FIFA nationality.

| No. | Pos. | Nation | Player |
|---|---|---|---|
| 1 | GK | MEX | Óscar Pérez |
| 2 | DF | ARG | Aníbal Matellán (vice-captain) |
| 3 | DF | MEX | Jesús Chávez |
| 4 | DF | MEX | Christian Sánchez |
| 5 | MF | MEX | José Joel González |
| 7 | MF | MEX | Ignacio Torres |
| 8 | MF | MEX | Jehu Chiapas |
| 10 | FW | PER | Wilmer Aguirre |
| 11 | MF | ARG | Facundo Pereyra |
| 12 | GK | MEX | César Lozano |
| 13 | MF | MEX | Moisés Velasco |
| 14 | MF | MEX | César Villaluz |
| 15 | MF | MEX | Fernando Morales |

| No. | Pos. | Nation | Player |
|---|---|---|---|
| 16 | DF | USA | Michael Orozco |
| 17 | DF | MEX | Daniel Alcántar |
| 18 | DF | MEX | Isaí Arredondo |
| 19 | DF | MEX | Arturo Ruíz |
| 21 | FW | MEX | Jesús Moreno |
| 22 | DF | MEX | Guillermo Cerda |
| 23 | FW | ARG | Alfredo Moreno (captain) |
| 24 | MF | MEX | Luis Rodríguez |
| 25 | GK | MEX | Gerson Rubén Marín |
| 26 | MF | MEX | William Paredes |
| 27 | DF | MEX | Diego Ordaz (on loan from C.F. Monterrey) |
| 28 | FW | ARG | Ismael Blanco |

=== Regular season ===
==== Clausura 2012 results ====
| January 7, 2012 Round 1 | San Luis | 1 – 0 | UNAM | Estadio Alfonso Lastras, San Luis Potosí |
| 20:45 | Matellán (yellow card) 22' (yellow-red card) 34'; Moreno (yellow card) 23'; Torres (yellow card) 31'; Chiapas 42', (yellow card) 71' | Report | Verón (yellow card) 21'; Campos (yellow card) 33'; Fuentes (yellow card) 61' | Referee: Jorge Isaac Rojas |

| January 13, 2012 Round 2 | Estudiantes Tecos | 0 – 2 | San Luis | Estadio Tres de Marzo, Zapopan |
| 20:10 | Colace (yellow card) 84' | Report | Moreno 19'; Velasco (yellow card) 34'; Aguirre 77', (red card) 92' | Referee: Miguel Ángel Chacón |

| January 20, 2012 Round 3 | Morelia | 2 – 0 | San Luis | Estadio Morelos, Morelia |
| 20:10 | Lozano 10', (yellow card) 20'; Ramírez (yellow card) 32'; Rojas 72' | Report | Paredes (yellow card) 71'; Moreno (yellow card) 67'; Velasco (yellow card) 69' | Referee: Ricardo Arellano |

| January 28, 2012 Round 4 | San Luis | 1 – 3 | América | Estadio Alfonso Lastras, San Luis Potosí |
| 20:45 | Aguirre 4'; Chiapas (yellow card) 19'; Chávez (yellow card) 33'; Paredes (yellow card) 38'; Orozco (yellow card) 55'; Alcántar (yellow card) 70' | Report | Benítez 9', 35' (pen.); Mosquera (yellow card) 22'; Rosinei 28'; Rojas (yellow card) 60' | Referee: Óscar Macias |

| February 4, 2012 Round 5 | Monterrey | 3 – 0 | San Luis | Estadio Tecnológico, Monterrey |
| 17:00 | de Nigris 30'; Delgado 34'; Zavala 55' | Report | Matellán (yellow card) 23'; Chiapas (yellow card) 27' (yellow-red card) 59' | Referee: Francisco Chacón |

| February 11, 2012 Round 6 | San Luis | 0 – 2 | UANL | Estadio Alfonso Lastras, San Luis Potosí |
| 20:45 | Velasco (yellow card) 13'; Moreno (yellow card) 24'; Torres (yellow card) 83' | Report | Jiménez 33'; Ayala (yellow card) 44'; Lobos 56'; Edno (yellow card) 60'; Álvarez (yellow card) 83' | Referee: Miguel Ángel Ortega |

| February 18, 2012 Round 7 | Guadalajara | 0 – 0 | San Luis | Estadio Omnilife, Zapopan |
| 19:00 | | Report | Arredondo (yellow card) 19'; Pérez (yellow card) 63' | Referee: Erim Ramírez |

| February 25, 2012 Round 8 | San Luis | 0 – 1 | Atlas | Estadio Alfonso Lastras, San Luis Potosí |
| 20:45 | Paredes (yellow card) 20'; Arredondo (red card) 27'; Aguirre (yellow card) 56'; Velasco (yellow card) 68' (yellow-red card) 69'; Villaluz (yellow card) 88' | Report | Santos 47'; Gutiérrez (yellow card) 52'; Paganoni (yellow card) 65'; Romero (yellow card) 80' | Referee: Roberto García Orozco |

| March 3, 2012 Round 9 | Santos Laguna | 5 – 2 | San Luis | Estadio TSM Corona, Torreón |
| 19:00 | Peralta 4', 17', 72', 79'; Ibañez (yellow card) 26'; Rodríguez (yellow card) 31'; Gómez (yellow card) 49', (goal) 54' | Report | Moreno (red card) 22'; Pereyra 22' (pen.); Aguirre 41'; Torres (yellow card) 70'; Matellán (yellow card) 77' | Referee: Jorge Antonio Pérez |

| March 10, 2012 Round 10 | San Luis | 0 – 0 | Pachuca | Estadio Alfonso Lastras, San Luis Potosí |
| 20:45 | Sánchez (yellow card) 45+'; Pereyra (yellow card) 77' | Report | Castillo (yellow card) 12'; Ayoví (yellow card) 82' | Referee: Jorge Isaac Rojas |

| March 18, 2012 Round 11 | Puebla | 0 – 1 | San Luis | Estadio Cuauhtémoc, Puebla |
| 12:00 | Juárez (yellow card) 16'; Zamora (yellow card) 42'; Polo (red card) 64'; Landín (yellow card) 67'; Lacerda (yellow card) 70' | Report | Orozco (yellow card) 12'; Torres (yellow card) 29'; Aguirre 71' (pen.); Velasco (yellow card) 73' | Referee: Mauricio Morales |

| March 24, 2012 Round 12 | San Luis | 2 – 3 | Atlante | Estadio Alfonso Lastras, San Luis Potosí |
| 20:45 | Chávez 32'; Torres (yellow card) 65'; Paredes (yellow card) 71'; Villaluz 86' | Report | Martínez 27', 51'; Vera (yellow card) 42' (yellow-red card) 84'; Hernández (yellow card) 52'; Arroyo 81' | Referee: Jorge Gasso |

| March 31, 2012 Round 13 | Cruz Azul | 3 – 1 | San Luis | Estadio Azul, Mexico City |
| 16:30 | Bravo 28', 38'; Perea 52' | Report | Moreno 14'; Paredes (yellow card) 55'; Velasco (yellow card) 66' | Referee: Miguel Ángel Chacón |

| April 7, 2012 Round 14 | San Luis | 2 – 3 | Chiapas | Estadio Alfonso Lastras, San Luis Potosí |
| 19:00 | Moreno 30' (pen.), 77' (pen.); Torres (yellow card) 38' | Report | Alcántar 4' (o.g.); M. Martínez (yellow card) 30' (yellow-red card) 76'; J. Martínez (yellow card) 55'; Andrade 57'; Rey 83' | Referee: Ricardo Arellano |

| April 14, 2012 Round 15 | Querétaro | 2 – 2 | San Luis | Estadio Corregidora, Querétaro |
| 17:00 | López (yellow card) 30'; Romo 47'; Carpizo 87' | Report | Aguirre (yellow card) 33'; Moreno 40'; Chiapas (yellow card) 76'; Pereyra 83'; Alcántar (yellow card) 90+1' | Referee: Francisco Chacón |

| April 21, 2012 Round 16 | San Luis | 0 – 1 | Tijuana | Estadio Alfonso Lastras, San Luis Potosí |
| 17:00 | Velasco (yellow card) 63'; Arredondo (yellow card) 70'; Moreno (yellow card) 90+1' | Report | Ruiz (yellow card) 36'; Riascos 74' | Referee: Erim Ramírez |

| April 29, 2012 Round 17 | Toluca | 2 – 1 | San Luis | Estadio Nemesio Díez, Toluca |
| 12:00 | D. de la Torre (yellow card) 20'; Alonso 25', 66' | Report | Sánchez (yellow card) 8'; Arredondo (yellow card) 54'; Pereyra 58' | Referee: Miguel Ángel Ortega |

San Luis did not qualify to the Final Phase

=== Goalscorers ===
| Position | Nation | Name | Goals scored |
|---|---|---|---|
| 1. | (Argentina) | Alfredo Moreno | 5 |
| 2. | (Peru) | Wilmer Aguirre | 4 |
| 3. | (Argentina) | Facundo Pereyra | 3 |
| 4. | (Mexico) | Jesús Roberto Chávez | 1 |
| 4. | (Mexico) | Jehu Chiapas | 1 |
| 4. | (Mexico) | César Villaluz | 1 |
| TOTAL | | | 15 |

=== Results ===
==== Results summary ====
| Overall | | | | | | | | Home | | | | | | Away | | | | | |
| Pld | W | D | L | GF | GA | GD | Pts | W | D | L | GF | GA | GD | W | D | L | GF | GA | GD |
|---|---|---|---|---|---|---|---|---|---|---|---|---|---|---|---|---|---|---|---|
| 17 | 3 | 3 | 11 | 15 | 30 | −15 | 12 | 1 | 1 | 6 | 6 | 13 | −7 | 2 | 2 | 5 | 9 | 17 | −8 |

Last updated: 29 April 2012.
Source: Clausura 2012 results

==== Results by round ====
| Round | 1 | 2 | 3 | 4 | 5 | 6 | 7 | 8 | 9 | 10 | 11 | 12 | 13 | 14 | 15 | 16 | 17 |
|---|---|---|---|---|---|---|---|---|---|---|---|---|---|---|---|---|---|
| Ground | H | A | A | H | A | H | A | H | A | H | A | H | A | H | A | H | A |
| Result | W | W | L | L | L | L | D | W | L | D | W | L | L | L | D | L | L |
| Position | 5 | 1 | 5 | 9 | 11 | 14 | 13 | 15 | 16 | 16 | 15 | 15 | 16 | 16 | 16 | 16 | 16 |

Updated to match(es) played on 29 April 2012. Source: Clausura 2012 results and mediotiempo.com
A = Away; H = Home; W = Win; D = Draw; L = Loss
