= 2010–11 San Luis F.C. season =

The 2010–11 San Luis season was the 64th professional season of Mexico's top-flight football league. The season is split into two tournaments—the Torneo Apertura and the Torneo Clausura—each with identical formats and each contested by the same eighteen teams. San Luis began their season on July 24, 2010 against Monterrey, San Luis played their home games on Saturdays at 8:45pm local time.

== Torneo Apertura ==
=== Squad ===
Note: Flags indicate national team as defined under FIFA eligibility rules; some limited exceptions apply. Players may hold more than one non-FIFA nationality.

No.	Pos.	Nation	Player
1	GK	MEX	Gerardo Daniel Ruíz
3	DF	ARG	Aníbal Matellán
4	DF	MEX	Christian Sánchez
5	DF	MEX	Marvin de la Cruz
6	MF	MEX	Jaime Correa
7	MF	MEX	Ignacio Torres
8	MF	MEX	Juan Carlos Medina
9	FW	ECU	Michael Arroyo
10	FW	PER	Wilmer Aguirre
11	MF	VEN	César González
12	GK	MEX	César Lozano
13	DF	MEX	Luis Omar Hernández

No.	Pos.	Nation	Player
14	DF	MEX	Noé Maya
15	MF	USA	Edgar Castillo
16	MF	MEX	Sergio Amaury Ponce
17	DF	MEX	Daniel Alcántar
18	MF	MEX	Diego de la Torre
20	MF	MEX	Osmar Mares
21	FW	MEX	Victor Hugo Lojero
22	DF	MEX	Manuel Alejandro García
25	GK	MEX	Gerson Rubén Marín
26	DF	MEX	Carlos Ramón Negrete
27	FW	MEX	Othoniel Arce
134	MF	MEX	Guillermo Rangel

=== Regular season ===
July 24, 2010 Round 1	San Luis	1 – 1	Monterrey	Estadio Alfonso Lastras, San Luis Potosí
8:45pm	Aguirre 68'	Report	Suazo 63'	Referee: Paul Delgadillo

August 1, 2010 Round 2	Puebla	2 – 1	San Luis	Estadio Cuauhtémoc, Puebla
12:00pm	Olivera 1'; Pereyra 45'	Report	Castillo 65'	Referee: Jesús Fabricio Morales

August 7, 2010 Round 3	San Luis	0 – 1	Guadalajara	Estadio Alfonso Lastras, San Luis Potosí
8:45pm		Report	Fabian 20'	Referee: Armando Archundia

August 14, 2010 Round 4	San Luis	1 – 0	Morelia	Estadio Alfonso Lastras, San Luis Potosí
8:45pm	Aguirre 57'	Report		Referee: Erim Ramírez

August 20, 2010 Round 5	Estudiantes Tecos	3 – 2	San Luis	Estadio Tres de Marzo, Zapopan
12:00pm	Ochoa 23'; Jiménez 73'; Morales 82'	Report	Arroyo 44'; Matellán 78'	Referee: José Alfredo Peñaloza

August 28, 2010 Round 6	San Luis	2 – 1	Atlante	Estadio Alfonso Lastras, San Luis Potosí
8:45pm	Aguirre 26'; González 89'	Report	Cardaccio 38'	Referee: Miguel Ángel Ayala

September 12, 2010 Round 7	UNAM	0 – 1	San Luis	Estadio Olímpico Universitario, Mexico City
12:00pm		Report	Moreno 28'	Referee: Jaime Herrera

September 18, 2010 Round 8	San Luis	1 – 0	Pachuca	Estadio Alfonso Lastras, San Luis Potosí
7:00pm	Arce 9'	Report		Referee: Marco Antonio Rodríguez

September 25, 2010 Round 9	Chiapas	2 – 1	San Luis	Estadio Victor Manuel Reyna, Tuxtla Gutierrez
5:00pm	Rodríguez 11'; Ochoa 68'	Report	Moreno 13'	Referee: Francisco Chacón

October 2, 2010 Round 10	San Luis	1 – 0	UANL	Estadio Alfonso Lastras, San Luis Potosí
8:45pm	Arce 47'	Report		Referee: Paul Delgadillo

October 9, 2010 Round 11	Atlas	2 – 1	San Luis	Estadio Jalisco, Guadalajara
8:45pm	Moreno 24'; Espinoza 90+3' (pen.)	Report	Ponce 76'	Referee: Mauricio Morales

October 16, 2010 Round 12	San Luis	3 – 2	Querétaro	Estadio Alfonso Lastras, San Luis Potosí
5:00pm	Medina 1'; Arroyo 34'; González 80'	Report	Nava 14'; Blanco 32'	Referee: Roberto García

October 22, 2010 Round 13	Necaxa	0 – 2	San Luis	Estadio Victoria, Aguascalientes
8:10pm		Report	Matellán 22'; Arroyo 90+2'	Referee: Armando Archundia

October 28, 2010 Round 14	San Luis	1 – 2	América	Estadio Alfonso Lastras, San Luis Potosí
8:30	Lojero 78'	Report	Montenegro 68'; Vuoso 85'	Referee: Jose Alfredo Peñaloza

October 31, 2010 Round 15	Toluca	1 – 2	San Luis	Estadio Nemesio Díez, Toluca
12:00pm	Sinha 69'	Report	Arroyo 3' 53'	Referee: Jaime Herrera

November 6, 2010 Round 16	San Luis	1 – 1	Santos Laguna	Estadio Alfonso Lastras, San Luis Potosí
5:00pm	de la Torre 58'	Report	Christian Benítez 54'	Referee: Fernando Guerrero

November 13, 2010 Round 17	Cruz Azul	1 – 0	San Luis	Estadio Azul, Mexico City
05:00pm	Cervantes 88'	Report		Referee: Jorge Eduardo Gasso

==== Final Phase ====
November 17, 2010 Quarterfinals	San Luis	0 – 0	América	Estadio Alfonso Lastras, San Luis Potosí
7:00pm		Report		Referee: Jaime Herrera

November 20, 2010 Quarterfinals	América	4 – 1	San Luis	Estadio Azteca, Mexico City
7:00pm	Sánchez 15'; Matellán 24' (o.g.); Esqueda 45'; Vuoso 81'	Report	de la Torre 53'	Referee: Francisco Chacón

América won 4–1 on aggregate.

=== Goalscorers ===
Position	Nation	Name	Goals scored
1.	(Ecuador)	Michael Arroyo	5
2.	(Peru)	Wilmer Aguirre	3
2.	(Colombia)	Tressor Moreno	3
4.	(Mexico)	Othoniel Arce	2
4.	(Venezuela)	César González	2
4.	(Argentina)	Aníbal Matellán	2
7.	(United States)	Edgar Castillo	1
7.	(Mexico)	Diego de la Torre	1
7.	(Mexico)	Víctor Lojero	1
7.	(Mexico)	Juan Carlos Medina	1
7.	(Mexico)	Sergio Amaury Ponce	1
TOTAL			22

=== Transfers ===
==== In ====
#	Pos	Player	From	Fee	Date	Notes

==== Out ====
Pos	Player	To	Fee	Date	Notes

=== Regular season statistics ===
==== Results summary ====
Overall								Home						Away					
Pld	W	D	L	GF	GA	GD	Pts	W	D	L	GF	GA	GD	W	D	L	GF	GA	GD
17	8	2	7	21	19	+2	26	5	2	2	11	8	+3	3	0	5	10	11	−1

Last updated: 29 January 2011.
Source: Apertura 2010 results

==== Results by round ====
Round	1	2	3	4	5	6	7	8	9	10	11	12	13	14	15	16	17
Ground	H	A	H	H	A	H	A	H	A	H	A	H	A	H	A	H	A
Result	D	L	L	W	L	W	W	W	L	W	L	W	W	L	W	D	L
Position	9	12	15	12	14	10	8	6	7	5	5	4	4	5	4	5	5

Updated to match(es) played on 29 January 2011. Source: Apertura 2010 results and mediotiempo.com
A = Away; H = Home; W = Win; D = Draw; L = Loss

== Torneo Clausura ==
=== Squad ===
Note: Flags indicate national team as defined under FIFA eligibility rules; some limited exceptions apply. Players may hold more than one non-FIFA nationality.

No.	Pos.	Nation	Player
1	GK	MEX	Carlos Alberto Trejo
2	DF	ARG	Aníbal Matellán
3	DF	MEX	Juan Carlos de la Barrera
4	DF	MEX	Christian Sánchez
5	MF	MEX	Guillermo Rangel
6	MF	MEX	Jaime Correa
7	MF	MEX	Ignacio Torres ((Captain)
8	MF	MEX	Juan Carlos Medina
9	FW	ECU	Michael Arroyo
10	FW	PER	Wilmer Aguirre
11	MF	ARG	Juan Cuevas
12	GK	MEX	César Lozano
13	DF	MEX	Luis Omar Hernández

No.	Pos.	Nation	Player
14	DF	MEX	Noé Maya
15	MF	MEX	Carlos Alberto Hurtado
16	MF	MEX	Sergio Amaury Ponce
17	DF	MEX	Daniel Alcántar
18	MF	MEX	Isaí Arredondo
19	FW	ARG	Juan Manuel Cavallo
20	DF	MEX	Osmar Mares
21	FW	MEX	Víctor Lojero
22	DF	MEX	Manuel Alejandro García
23	MF	MEX	Jesús Isijara
25	GK	MEX	Gerson Marín
26	DF	MEX	Gabriel Rojo de la Vega
27	FW	MEX	Othoniel Arce

=== Regular season ===
January 8, 2011 Round 1	Monterrey	0 – 2	San Luis	Estadio Tecnológico, Monterrey
5:00pm		Report	Mares 73'; Medina 90+3'	Referee: Jorge Isaac Rojas

January 15, 2011 Round 2	San Luis	3 – 0	Puebla	Estadio Alfonso Lastras, San Luis Potosí
5:00pm	Arce 19'; Aguirre 60', 67' (pen.)	Report		Referee: Miguel Ángel Ayala

January 22, 2011 Round 3	Guadalajara	1 – 1	San Luis	Estadio Omnilife, Zapopan
7:00pm	Torres 66'	Report	Matellán 76'	Referee: Erim Ramírez

January 30, 2011 Round 4	Morelia	3 – 3	San Luis	Estadio Morelos, Morelia
12:00pm	Lozano 14'; Aldrete 64'; Sabah 72'	Report	Aguirre 32' (pen.), 49'; Pérez 70' (o.g.)	Referee: Miguel Ángel Flores

February 5, 2011 Round 5	San Luis	3 – 2	Estudiantes Tecos	Estadio Alfonso Lastras, San Luis Potosí
8:45pm	Hernández 62'; Cavallo 78'; Aguirre 88' (pen.)	Report	Rangel 20'; Sambueza 14'	Referee: Julio Escobar

February 12, 2011 Round 6	Atlante	0 – 0	San Luis	Estadio Quintana Roo, Cancún
9:00pm		Report		Referee: Jorge Eduardo Gasso

September 12, 2010 Round 7	San Luis	0 – 1	UNAM	Estadio Alfonso Lastras, San Luis Potosí
5:00pm		Report	Bravo 3'	Referee: Roberto García Orozco

February 26, 2011 Round 8	Pachuca	0 – 0	San Luis	Estadio Hidalgo, Pachuca
7:00pm		Report		Referee: Fabricio Morales

March 5, 2011 Round 9	San Luis	0 – 0	Chiapas	Estadio Alfonso Lastras, San Luis Potosí
8:45pm		Report		Referee: Ricardo Arellano

March 12, 2011 Round 10	UANL	1 – 1	San Luis	Estadio Universitario, San Nicolás
7:00pm	Mancilla 45' (pen.)	Report	Aguirre 59'	Referee: Paul Delgadillo

March 19, 2011 Round 11	San Luis	1 – 1	Atlas	Estadio Alfonso Lastras, San Luis Potosí
8:45pm	Aguirre 78'	Report	Ortega 89'	Referee: Jaime Herrera

April 2, 2011 Round 12	Querétaro	3 – 2	San Luis	Estadio Corregidora, Querétaro
5:00pm	López 28'; Bueno 33', 86'	Report	Mares 7'; Cuevas 21'	Referee: Francisco Chacón

April 9, 2011 Round 13	San Luis	0 – 0	Necaxa	Estadio Alfonso Lastras, San Luis Potosí
8:45pm		Report		Referee: Juan Genaro Medrano

February 2, 2011 Round 14	América	3 – 0	San Luis	Estadio Azteca, Mexico City
8:30pm	Vuoso 45' (pen.), 69' (pen.); Reyna 50'	Report		Referee: Marco Antonio Rodríguez

April 16, 2011 Round 15	San Luis	1 – 2	Toluca	Estadio Alfonso Lastras, San Luis Potosí
8:45pm	Ponce 85'	Report	M. de la Torre 81'; Nava 90'	Referee: Ricardo Arellano

April 23, 2011 Round 16	Santos Laguna	1 – 3	San Luis	Estadio Corona, Torreón
7:00pm	Rodríguez 80'	Report	Aguirre 30', 32', 60'	Referee: Jorge Eduardo Gasso

April 30, 2011 Round 17	San Luis	0 – 0	Cruz Azul	Estadio Alfonso Lastras, San Luis Potosí
8:45pm		Report		Referee: Roberto García Orozco

=== Goalscorers ===
Position	Nation	Name	Goals scored
1.	(Peru)	Wilmer Aguirre	10
2.	(Mexico)	Osmar Mares	2
3.	(Mexico)	Othoniel Arce	1
3.	(Argentina)	Juan Manuel Cavallo	1
3.	(Argentina)	Juan Cuevas	1
3.	(Argentina)	Aníbal Matellán	1
3.	(Mexico)	Juan Carlos Medina	1
3.	(Mexico)	Luis Omar Hernández	1
3.	(Mexico)	Sergio Amaury Ponce	1
3.		Own Goal	1
TOTAL			20

=== Regular season statistics ===
==== Results summary ====
Overall								Home						Away					
Pld	W	D	L	GF	GA	GD	Pts	W	D	L	GF	GA	GD	W	D	L	GF	GA	GD
17	4	9	4	20	22	−2	21	2	4	2	8	11	−3	2	5	2	12	11	+1

Last updated: 6 May 2011.
Source: Clausura 2011 results

==== Results by round ====
Round	1	2	3	4	5	6	7	8	9	10	11	12	13	14	15	16	17
Ground	A	H	A	A	H	A	H	A	H	A	H	A	H	A	H	A	H
Result	W	W	D	D	W	D	L	D	D	D	D	L	D	L	L	W	D
Position	3	2	2	2	2	3	5	5	6	8	7	11	10	10	12	11	11

Updated to match(es) played on 6 May 2011. Source: Clausura 2011 results and mediotiempo.com
A = Away; H = Home; W = Win; D = Draw; L = Loss
