= List of Mexican football transfers summer 2009 =

This is a list of Mexican football transfers in the Mexican Primera Division during the summer 2009 transfer window, grouped by club. Football has been played professionally in Mexico since the early 1900s. Since 1996, the country has played two split seasons instead of a traditional long season. There are two separate playoff and league divisions. After many years of calling the regular seasons as "Verano" (Summer) and "Invierno" (Winter), the Primera División de México (Mexican First League Division) has changed the names of the competition and opted for "Apertura" (opening) and "Clausura" (closing) events. The Apertura division begins in the middle of Mexico's summer and ends before the official start of winter. The Clausura division begins during the New Year and concludes in the spring season.

== Mexican Primera Division ==
=== America ===
In: Note: Flags indicate national team as defined under FIFA eligibility rules; some limited exceptions apply. Players may hold more than one non-FIFA nationality.

No.	Pos.	Nation	Player
19	DF	MEX	Fernando Lopez (From Necaxa)
18	MF	MEX	Ángel Reyna (From San Luis)
8	MF	MEX	Israel Martínez (From San Luis)
20	MF	MEX	Arnhold Rivas (Loan from Estudiantes)
3	DF	COL	Aquivaldo Mosquera (From Sevilla)
11	MF	ARG	Daniel Montenegro (from Independiente)
5	MF	BRA	Rosinei (from Inter Porto Alegre)

Out: Note: Flags indicate national team as defined under FIFA eligibility rules; some limited exceptions apply. Players may hold more than one non-FIFA nationality.

No.	Pos.	Nation	Player
6	DF	MEX	Diego Alberto Cervantes (Loan to Atlante, previously on Loan at Necaxa)
20	MF	MEX	Alejandro Argüello (Loan to Chiapas)
14	DF	MEX	Carlos Infante (Loan to Puebla, previously on Loan at Necaxa)
7	FW	ARG	Alfredo Moreno (Loan to San Luis, previously on Loan at Necaxa)
15	DF	USA	Edgar Eduardo Castillo (Loan to Tigres)
125	DF	ARG	Fernando Ortiz (Loan to Tigres)
40	MF	MEX	Alfredo Omar Tena (To Querétaro, previously on Loan at Cruz Azul)
36	GK	MEX	Milton Aguilar (Loan to Santos Laguna)
5	MF	PAR	Enrique Vera (To LDU Quito)
11	FW	BRA	Robert (To Palmeiras)

=== Atlante ===
In: Note: Flags indicate national team as defined under FIFA eligibility rules; some limited exceptions apply. Players may hold more than one non-FIFA nationality.

No.	Pos.	Nation	Player
19	DF	MEX	Guillermo Rojas (From Veracruz)
26	DF	MEX	Clemente Ovalle (Loan from Monterrey)
5	MF	MEX	José Joel González (From Necaxa, previously on Loan)
6	DF	MEX	Diego Alberto Cervantes (Loan from América, previously on Loan at Necaxa)
11	MF	ARG	Santiago Solari (From San Lorenzo de Almagro)

Out: Note: Flags indicate national team as defined under FIFA eligibility rules; some limited exceptions apply. Players may hold more than one non-FIFA nationality.

No.	Pos.	Nation	Player
33	GK	MEX	Omar Ortíz (To Monterrey)
9	FW	VEN	Giancarlo Maldonado (To Xerez)
13	MF	MEX	Tomás Dominguez (To LOBOS de la BUAP)
11	FW	COL	Luis Gabriel Rey (To Morelia)
6	MF	MEX	Gerardo Espinoza (To Atlas)
65	FW	MEX	Ismael Valadéz (To León)

=== Atlas ===
In: Note: Flags indicate national team as defined under FIFA eligibility rules; some limited exceptions apply. Players may hold more than one non-FIFA nationality.

No.	Pos.	Nation	Player
7	MF	MEX	Gerardo Espinoza (Loan return from Atlante)
27	DF	MEX	Omar Trujillo (Loan from Morelia)
11	FW	MEX	Daniel Osorno (Loan from Puebla)
14	DF	MEX	Mario Pérez (Loan from Necaxa)
29	DF	MEX	Mario Méndez (Loan from Toluca)
18	MF	MEX	Miguel Zepeda (Loan from Santos Laguna)
7	FW	ARG	Daniel Rios (From Toluca)
1	GK	ARG	Mariano Barbosa (From River Plate)

Out: Note: Flags indicate national team as defined under FIFA eligibility rules; some limited exceptions apply. Players may hold more than one non-FIFA nationality.

No.	Pos.	Nation	Player
11	FW	ARG	Bruno Marioni (Loan to Estudiantes)
7	MF	MEX	Jorge Hernández (Loan to Morelia)
--	MF	MEX	Gregorio Torres (Loan to Pachuca)
17	FW	PAR	Jorge Achucarro (Released)
--	DF	MEX	Christian Sánchez (Loan to Santos Laguna)
--	DF	MEX	Jaime Durán (Loan return to Morelia)
8	MF	MEX	Lucas Ayala (Loan return to Tigres)

=== Chiapas ===
In: Note: Flags indicate national team as defined under FIFA eligibility rules; some limited exceptions apply. Players may hold more than one non-FIFA nationality.

No.	Pos.	Nation	Player
11	GK	MEX	Oscar Perez (Loan from Cruz Azul)
6	MF	MEX	Francisco Mendoza (Loan from Guadalajara)
14	MF	MEX	Alejandro Argüello (Loan from América)
--	DF	MEX	Hugo Sánchez Guerrero (Loan from UANL)
--	DF	MEX	Salvador Medina (On loan from Pumas Morelos)
--	FW	BRA	Josiel da Rocha (From Flamengo)
27	FW	MEX	Ezequiel Orozco (From Necaxa)
?	MF	CHI	Cristian Alvarez (Loan from Beitar Jerusalem)

Out: Note: Flags indicate national team as defined under FIFA eligibility rules; some limited exceptions apply. Players may hold more than one non-FIFA nationality.

No.	Pos.	Nation	Player
18	FW	BRA	Itamar (To Tigres UANL)
12	GK	MEX	Fabián Villaseñor (Loan to Estudiantes)
--	MF	MEX	Felipe de Jesús Ayala (Loan to Puebla)
10	MF	MEX	Gilberto Mora (Loan to Puebla)
6	MF	BRA	Andre Luiz Moreira (released)

=== Indios ===
In: Note: Flags indicate national team as defined under FIFA eligibility rules; some limited exceptions apply. Players may hold more than one non-FIFA nationality.

No.	Pos.	Nation	Player
8	MF	MEX	Tomás Campos (From Cruz Azul)
9	FW	BRA	Rodrigão (From (Brazil) Vitória)
10	FW	CMR	Alain Nkong (From (France) Boulogne)
11	FW	URU	Héctor Giménez (Loan from San Luis)
13	GK	MEX	César Lozano (From Toluca)
25	DF	MEX	Sindey Balderas (Loan from UANL)

Out: Note: Flags indicate national team as defined under FIFA eligibility rules; some limited exceptions apply. Players may hold more than one non-FIFA nationality.

No.	Pos.	Nation	Player
13	GK	MEX	Cirilo Saucedo (Loan return to U.A.N.L. Tigres)
7	MF	MEX	Manuel Pérez (Loan return to C.F. Monterrey)
9	FW	ARG	Ezequiel Maggiolo (Loan return to Estudiantes de La Plata)
10	MF	ARG	Juan Augusto Gómez (To Lobos BUAP)

=== Cruz Azul ===
In: Note: Flags indicate national team as defined under FIFA eligibility rules; some limited exceptions apply. Players may hold more than one non-FIFA nationality.

No.	Pos.	Nation	Player
1	GK	MEX	José de Jesús Corona (From Estudiantes)
--	DF	MEX	Melvin Brown (Loan from Estudiantes Tecos)
15	DF	MEX	Horacio Cervantes (From Morelia)
10	MF	HON	Ramón Núñez (From Puebla)
--	FW	MEX	Mario Ortiz (From Estudiantes Tecos)
30	FW	ARG	Emanuel Villa (From Derby County)
--	FW	CHI	Emilio Hernandez (From Universidad de Chile)

Out: Note: Flags indicate national team as defined under FIFA eligibility rules; some limited exceptions apply. Players may hold more than one non-FIFA nationality.

No.	Pos.	Nation	Player
14	DF	MEX	Joaquín Beltrán (Loan to Querétaro)
--	MF	MEX	Tomás Campos (To Juárez)
1	GK	MEX	Oscar Perez (Loan to Chiapas)
--	DF	MEX	Roberto Carlos Juárez (Loan to Puebla)
8	DF	PAR	Carlos Bonet (Released)
11	FW	PAR	Roberto Ovelar (Waived)
20	MF	ARG	Marcelo Carrusca (Loan return to Galatasaray)

=== Guadalajara ===
In: Note: Flags indicate national team as defined under FIFA eligibility rules; some limited exceptions apply. Players may hold more than one non-FIFA nationality.

No.	Pos.	Nation	Player
99	FW	MEX	Omar Bravo (Free agent)

Out: Note: Flags indicate national team as defined under FIFA eligibility rules; some limited exceptions apply. Players may hold more than one non-FIFA nationality.

No.	Pos.	Nation	Player
21	FW	MEX	Jared Borgetti (To Puebla)
25	GK	MEX	Sergio Rodríguez (On loan to Querétaro)
27	FW	MEX	Carlos Ochoa (To Santos Laguna, previously on loan from Monterrey)
--	FW	MEX	Isaac Romo (To Querétaro, previously on loan)
--	MF	MEX	Emilio López (To Querétaro, previously on loan)
--	GK	MEX	Alfredo Talavera (Loan to Toluca, previously on loan to Tigres)
2	DF	MEX	Arturo Ledesma (Loan to Necaxa)

=== Monterrey ===
In: Note: Flags indicate national team as defined under FIFA eligibility rules; some limited exceptions apply. Players may hold more than one non-FIFA nationality.

No.	Pos.	Nation	Player
25	GK	MEX	Omar Ortíz (From Atlante)
5	DF	MEX	Duilio Davino (From Puebla)
9	FW	MEX	Sergio Santana (From Toluca)

Out: Note: Flags indicate national team as defined under FIFA eligibility rules; some limited exceptions apply. Players may hold more than one non-FIFA nationality.

No.	Pos.	Nation	Player
--	FW	MEX	Carlos Ochoa (To Santos Laguna, previously on loan to Guadalajara)
9	FW	MEX	Luis Alonso Sandoval (To Morelia)
7	MF	MEX	Octavio Valdez (To San Luis)
--	MF	MEX	Jose Gonzalez (To Atlante)
--	DF	MEX	Clemente Ovalle (To Atlante)

=== Morelia ===
In: Note: Flags indicate national team as defined under FIFA eligibility rules; some limited exceptions apply. Players may hold more than one non-FIFA nationality.

No.	Pos.	Nation	Player
3	DF	MEX	Jaime Durán (Loan return from Atlas)
27	MF	MEX	Jorge Hernández (On loan from Atlas)
18	FW	COL	Luis Gabriel Rey (from Atlante)
81	MF	COL	Aldo Leao Ramirez (Loan return from Atlético Nacional)
7	MF	MEX	Luis Alonso Sandoval (From Monterrey)

Out: Note: Flags indicate national team as defined under FIFA eligibility rules; some limited exceptions apply. Players may hold more than one non-FIFA nationality.

No.	Pos.	Nation	Player
10	MF	CRC	Oscar Emilio Rojas (To Mérida F.C.)
25	DF	MEX	Horacio Cervantes (To Cruz Azul)
27	DF	MEX	Omar Trujillo (To Atlas)
18	FW	PER	Andres Mendoza (Released)
8	MF	MEX	Ignacio Carrasco (To Club Tijuana)

=== Pachuca ===
In: Note: Flags indicate national team as defined under FIFA eligibility rules; some limited exceptions apply. Players may hold more than one non-FIFA nationality.

No.	Pos.	Nation	Player
11	FW	MEX	Juan Carlos Cacho (On loan from Pumas UNAM)
21	MF	ARG	Damián Manso (From Liga de Quito)
6	MF	MEX	Gregorio Torres (From Santos)
43	DF	MEX	Braulio Godínez (From Sinaloa previously at Indios de Ciudad Juárez)

Out: Note: Flags indicate national team as defined under FIFA eligibility rules; some limited exceptions apply. Players may hold more than one non-FIFA nationality.

No.	Pos.	Nation	Player
21	FW	PAN	Blas Pérez (Loan return to Tigres UANL, but now released)

=== Puebla ===
In: Note: Flags indicate national team as defined under FIFA eligibility rules; some limited exceptions apply. Players may hold more than one non-FIFA nationality.

No.	Pos.	Nation	Player
58	FW	MEX	Jared Borgetti (Free Agent)
20	FW	GUA	Carlos Ruiz (From Olimpia Asunción)
--	MF	MEX	Carlos Infante (On Loan from America)
30	MF	MEX	Felipe Ayala (Loan from Jaguares)
11	MF	MEX	Gilberto Mora (Loan from Jaguares)
--	DF	MEX	Roberto Juárez (Loan from Cruz Azul)
10	MF	URU	Nicolás Olivera (From Veracruz)
8	FW	PAR	Nicolas Martinez (From Olimpia)
--	MF	MEX	Joaquin Reyes (From Santos)
--	MF	MEX	Diego Moragues (Free Agent)
--	FW	URU	Nicolás Vigneri (From Racing Club)

Out: Note: Flags indicate national team as defined under FIFA eligibility rules; some limited exceptions apply. Players may hold more than one non-FIFA nationality.

No.	Pos.	Nation	Player
9	FW	MEX	Daniel Osorno (To Atlas)
10	MF	HON	Ramón Núñez (To Cruz Azul)
20	DF	MEX	Duilio Davino (To Monterrey)
13	FW	URU	Álvaro Fabián González (Released)
28	FW	BRA	Everaldo Ferreira (Released)
15	DF	PER	Walter Vilchez (Released)

=== Querétaro ===
In: Note: Flags indicate national team as defined under FIFA eligibility rules; some limited exceptions apply. Players may hold more than one non-FIFA nationality.

No.	Pos.	Nation	Player
11	FW	MEX	Isaac Romo (From Guadalajara (Chivas), previously on loan)
24	MF	MEX	López (From Guadalajara (Chivas), previously on loan)
--	GK	MEX	Sergio Rodríguez (On loan from Guadalajara(Chivas))
--	DF	MEX	Orlando Pineda (On loan from Pumas UNAM)
--	DF	MEX	Joaquín Beltrán (Loan from Cruz Azul)
--	DF	URU	Adrián Romero (From Nacional)
--	FW	URU	Mauro Vila (From Defensor Sporting)
--	FW	URU	Diego Chavez (From Montevideo Wanderers)
--	GK	ARG	Carlos Bossio (From Lanús)

Out: Note: Flags indicate national team as defined under FIFA eligibility rules; some limited exceptions apply. Players may hold more than one non-FIFA nationality.

No.	Pos.	Nation	Player
8	DF	MEX	Joel Sanchez (To UAG)

=== San Luis ===
In: Note: Flags indicate national team as defined under FIFA eligibility rules; some limited exceptions apply. Players may hold more than one non-FIFA nationality.

No.	Pos.	Nation	Player
--	GK	MEX	Jorge Bernal (From Necaxa)
--	MF	MEX	Marvin de la Cruz (From Necaxa)
7	MF	ARG	Eduardo Coudet (From Necaxa)
9	FW	ARG	Alfredo Moreno (From Necaxa)
--	DF	PAR	Pablo César Aguilar
--	FW	COL	César Valoyes (From Veracruz)
--	MF	VEN	César González (footballer) (Loan from Huracán)

Out: Note: Flags indicate national team as defined under FIFA eligibility rules; some limited exceptions apply. Players may hold more than one non-FIFA nationality.

No.	Pos.	Nation	Player
15	DF	MEX	Alfredo Gonzalez Tahuilan (To Tigres)
8	FW	COL	Diego Alvarez (Released)

=== Santos Laguna ===
In: Note: Flags indicate national team as defined under FIFA eligibility rules; some limited exceptions apply. Players may hold more than one non-FIFA nationality.

No.	Pos.	Nation	Player
9	FW	MEX	Carlos Ochoa (From Monterrey, previously on loan to Guadalajara)
11	FW	MEX	Jose Maria Cardenas (From Pachuca)

Out: Note: Flags indicate national team as defined under FIFA eligibility rules; some limited exceptions apply. Players may hold more than one non-FIFA nationality.

No.	Pos.	Nation	Player
11	FW	ECU	Christian Benítez (To Birmingham City)

=== Toluca ===
In: Note: Flags indicate national team as defined under FIFA eligibility rules; some limited exceptions apply. Players may hold more than one non-FIFA nationality.

No.	Pos.	Nation	Player
12	GK	MEX	Alfredo Talavera (On loan from Guadalajara (Chivas), previously on loan to Tigres UANL)
27	MF	COL	Vladimir Marín (From Club Libertad)

Out: Note: Flags indicate national team as defined under FIFA eligibility rules; some limited exceptions apply. Players may hold more than one non-FIFA nationality.

No.	Pos.	Nation	Player
7	FW	MEX	Sergio Santana (To Monterrey)
12	GK	MEX	César Lozano (To Indios de Ciudad Juárez)
27	FW	ARG	Daniel Rios (To Atlas)
3	DF	PAR	Paulo Da Silva (To Sunderland)
29	DF	MEX	Mario Méndez (To Atlas)

=== Estudiantes Tecos ===
In: Note: Flags indicate national team as defined under FIFA eligibility rules; some limited exceptions apply. Players may hold more than one non-FIFA nationality.

No.	Pos.	Nation	Player
10	FW	ARG	Mauro Cejas (From Universidad San Martín de Porres)
9	FW	ARG	Bruno Marioni (On loan from Atlas)
12	GK	MEX	Fabian Villasenor (From Jaguares)
8	DF	MEX	Joel Sanchez (From Querétaro)
14	MF	ARG	Rubens Sambueza (From River Plate)

Out: Note: Flags indicate national team as defined under FIFA eligibility rules; some limited exceptions apply. Players may hold more than one non-FIFA nationality.

No.	Pos.	Nation	Player
1	GK	MEX	José de Jesús Corona (To Cruz Azul)
9	FW	ARG	Claudio Graf (To LDU Quito)
10	FW	MEX	Mario Ortiz (Loan return to Cruz Azul)
29	DF	MEX	Melvin Brown (To Cruz Azul)
6	MF	CHI	Nelson Pinto (Released)
19	FW	MEX	Arnhold Rivas (To America)
5	MF	URU	Marcelo Sosa (Waived)

=== UANL ===
In: Note: Flags indicate national team as defined under FIFA eligibility rules; some limited exceptions apply. Players may hold more than one non-FIFA nationality.

No.	Pos.	Nation	Player
11	FW	BRA	Itamar (From Jaguares Chiapas)
15	DF	MEX	Edgar Castillo (From Club América)
19	DF	ARG	Fernando Ortiz (From Club América)
5	DF	MEX	Alfredo Gonzalez Tahuilan (From San Luis)
17	MF	MEX	David Toledo (From Pumas UNAM)
8	MF	MEX	Lucas Ayala (Loan return from Atlas)
1	GK	MEX	Cirilo Saucedo (Loan return from CF Indios)
10	FW	ARG	Gaston Fernandez (Loan return from Estudiantes de La Plata)

Out: Note: Flags indicate national team as defined under FIFA eligibility rules; some limited exceptions apply. Players may hold more than one non-FIFA nationality.

No.	Pos.	Nation	Player
1	GK	MEX	Óscar Pérez (To Jaguares Chiapas, previously on loan from Cruz Azul)
5	DF	PAR	Pedro Benitez (Released)
9	FW	PAN	Blas Pérez (Released, previously on loan to Pachuca)
8	FW	PAR	Ariel Bogado (Waived)
10	FW	PAR	Julio Aguilar (Waived)

=== UNAM ===
In: Note: Flags indicate national team as defined under FIFA eligibility rules; some limited exceptions apply. Players may hold more than one non-FIFA nationality.

No.	Pos.	Nation	Player

Out: Note: Flags indicate national team as defined under FIFA eligibility rules; some limited exceptions apply. Players may hold more than one non-FIFA nationality.

No.	Pos.	Nation	Player
11	FW	MEX	Juan Carlos Cacho (On loan to Pachuca)
26	MF	MEX	David Toledo (To Tigres UANL)
34	DF	MEX	Orlando Pineda (On loan to Querétaro)
33	DF	MEX	Salvador Medina (On loan to Jaguares de Chiapas)

== See also ==
- Primera División de México Apertura 2009
