= Primera División de México Invierno 2001 =

Primera División de México
- Season: 2001−02
- Champions: Pachuca (2nd title)
- Champions' Cup: Pachuca
- Copa Libertadores: América; Morelia
- Top goalscorer: Martín Rodríguez (12 goals)

Primera División de México Invierno 2001 (Mexico First Division Winter 2001) is the second part of a two tournament season in Association football in Mexico. It began on July 21, 2001, and ended on November 25, the end of the season. La Piedad was promoted to Primera División de México, making possible that 19 teams took part in the Mexican First Division instead of the 18 teams in previous seasons. Pachuca defeated UANL in the final, their second title win.

== Clubs ==
Location of the Primera División Invierno 2001 teams

Team	City	Stadium
América	Mexico City	Azteca
Atlante	Mexico City	Azul
Atlas	Guadalajara, Jalisco	Jalisco
Celaya	Celaya, Guanajuato	Miguel Alemán Valdés
Cruz Azul	Mexico City	Azul
Guadalajara	Guadalajara, Jalisco	Jalisco
Irapuato	Irapuato, Guanajuato	Sergio León Chávez
La Piedad	La Piedad, Michoacán	Juan N. López
León	León, Guanajuato	León
Morelia	Morelia, Michoacán	Morelos
Monterrey	Monterrey, Nuevo León	Tecnológico
Necaxa	Mexico City	Azteca
Pachuca	Pachuca, Hidalgo	Hidalgo
Puebla	Puebla, Puebla	Cuauhtémoc
Santos Laguna	Torreón, Coahuila	Corona
Toluca	Toluca, State of Mexico	Nemesio Díez
UAG	Zapopan, Jalisco	Tres de Marzo
UANL	San Nicolás de los Garza, Nuevo León	Universitario
UNAM	Mexico City	Olímpico Universitario

== Regular phase ==
Group 1
Pos	Team	Pld	W	D	L	GF	GA	GD	Pts	Qualification
1	Cruz Azul	18	8	6	4	33	24	+9	30	Directly qualified to the Liguilla (Playoffs)
2	Guadalajara	18	6	8	4	20	20	0	26	Directly qualified to the Liguilla (Playoffs)
3	Atlas	18	6	3	9	25	29	−4	21	
4	Monterrey	18	4	8	6	23	31	−8	20	
5	Celaya	18	5	4	9	27	33	−6	19	

Source: MedioTiempo

Group 2
Pos	Team	Pld	W	D	L	GF	GA	GD	Pts	Qualification
1	Toluca	18	8	8	2	33	22	+11	32	Directly qualified to the Liguilla (Playoffs)
2	Santos Laguna	18	7	3	8	36	34	+2	24	Directly qualified to the Liguilla (Playoffs)
3	Morelia	18	5	5	8	24	30	−6	20	
4	Irapuato	18	4	7	7	27	26	+1	19	
5	La Piedad	18	4	7	7	28	40	−12	19	

Source: MedioTiempo

Group 3
Pos	Team	Pld	W	D	L	GF	GA	GD	Pts	Qualification
1	Necaxa	18	6	9	3	21	20	+1	27	Directly qualified to the Liguilla (Playoffs)
2	Atlante	18	6	8	4	24	21	+3	26	Directly qualified to the Liguilla (Playoffs)
3	América	18	6	6	6	21	21	0	24	
4	UAG	18	4	7	7	21	23	−2	19	
5	León	18	4	7	7	25	31	−6	19	

Source: MedioTiempo

Group 4
Pos	Team	Pld	W	D	L	GF	GA	GD	Pts	Qualification
1	UANL	18	11	3	4	26	12	+14	36	Directly qualified to the Liguilla (Playoffs)
2	Pachuca	18	9	5	4	29	24	+5	32	Directly qualified to the Liguilla (Playoffs)
3	Puebla	18	5	8	5	22	22	0	23	
4	UNAM	18	3	8	7	20	22	−2	17	

Source: MedioTiempo

== League table ==
Pos	Team	Pld	W	D	L	GF	GA	GD	Pts	Qualification
1	UANL	18	11	3	4	26	12	+14	36	Directly qualified to the Liguilla (Playoffs)
2	Toluca	18	8	8	2	33	22	+11	32	Directly qualified to the Liguilla (Playoffs)
3	Pachuca	18	9	5	4	29	24	+5	32	Directly qualified to the Liguilla (Playoffs)
4	Cruz Azul	18	8	6	4	33	24	+9	30	Directly qualified to the Liguilla (Playoffs)
5	Necaxa	18	6	9	3	21	20	+1	27	Directly qualified to the Liguilla (Playoffs)
6	Atlante	18	6	8	4	24	21	+3	26	Directly qualified to the Liguilla (Playoffs)
7	Guadalajara	18	6	8	4	20	20	0	26	Directly qualified to the Liguilla (Playoffs)
8	Santos Laguna	18	7	3	8	36	34	+2	24	Directly qualified to the Liguilla (Playoffs)
9	América	18	6	6	6	21	21	0	24	
10	Puebla	18	5	8	5	22	22	0	23	
11	Atlas	18	6	3	9	25	29	−4	21	
12	Morelia	18	5	5	8	24	30	−6	20	
13	Monterrey	18	4	8	6	23	31	−8	20	
14	Irapuato	18	4	7	7	27	26	+1	19	
15	UAG	18	4	7	7	21	23	−2	19	
16	Celaya	18	5	4	9	27	33	−6	19	
17	León	18	4	7	7	25	31	−6	19	
18	La Piedad	18	4	7	7	28	40	−12	19	
19	UNAM	18	3	8	7	20	22	−2	17	

Source: MedioTiempo

== Results ==
Home \ Away	AME	ATE	ATS	CEL	CAZ	GDL	IRA	LAP	LEO	MTY	MOR	NEC	PAC	PUE	SAN	TOL	UAG	UNL	UNM
América	—	3–2	–	1–2	1–2	–	1–1	–	1–2	–	–	–	0–0	1–0	–	3–1	1–1	–	–
Atlante	–	—	–	2–1	2–2	–	1–0	–	3–1	–	1–1	–	2–0	–	–	2–2	2–1	–	–
Atlas	0–2	2–0	—	1–5	0–0	–	–	–	4–1	–	–	–	–	3–1	–	0–3	0–1	0–0	–
Celaya	–	–	–	—	0–2	2–2	2–1	–	2–1	–	5–2	–	1–3	–	1–3	0–1	–	–	–
Cruz Azul	–	–	–	–	—	2–3	2–3	–	–	4–2	2–2	0–0	3–2	1–0	0–0	–	–	–	1–0
Guadalajara	1–1	0–0	0–3	–	–	—	–	1–1	–	3–1	–	0–0	–	–	–	–	1–0	0–2	2–2
Irapuato	–	–	3–0	–	–	1–0	—	6–1	–	1–1	2–4	2–3	0–1	2–3	1–1	–	–	–	0–0
La Piedad	1–1	2–2	2–4	2–1	1–5	–	–	—	1–1	–	–	–	–	3–2	–	2–0	1–1	2–0	–
León	–	–	–	–	2–2	1–2	2–2	–	—	1–0	1–1	2–1	1–1	–	4–2	–	–	–	–
Monterrey	1–0	2–2	3–1	2–1	–	–	–	1–1	–	—	–	1–1	–	–	–	–	3–3	0–0	1–0
Morelia	2–0	–	0–3	–	–	0–1	–	2–2	–	2–0	—	0–1	–	–	3–2	–	–	3–1	1–1
Necaxa	0–1	0–0	1–0	2–2	–	–	–	2–0	–	–	–	—	–	–	–	2–2	1–0	0–4	2–1
Pachuca	–	–	2–1	–	–	2–1	–	3–1	–	3–3	1–0	2–2	—	–	2–1	–	–	1–0	2–0
Puebla	–	0–0	–	1–1	–	1–1	–	–	2–2	2–1	1–0	1–1	–	—	2–1	0–0	1–1	–	–
Santos Laguna	2–3	2–1	3–1	–	–	0–1	–	6–4	–	5–0	–	2–2	–	–	—	–	–	1–2	1–0
Toluca	–	–	–	–	2–1	1–1	1–1	–	3–1	1–1	3–1	–	4–3	–	6–2	—	–	–	–
UAG	–	–	–	1–1	1–2	–	1–1	–	2–1	–	3–0	–	1–1	–	1–2	0–1	—	–	–
UANL	2–0	2–0	–	1–0	3–2	–	2–0	–	1–0	–	–	–	–	2–0	–	1–1	3–1	—	–
UNAM	1–1	0–2	2–2	5–0	–	–	–	2–1	1–1	–	–	–	–	2–2	–	1–1	1–2	1–0	—

Updated to match(es) played on 25 November 2001. Source: RSSSF
Legend: Blue = home team win; Yellow = draw; Red = away team win.

== Top goalscorers ==
Players sorted first by goals scored, then by last name. Only regular season goals listed.

Rank	Player	Club	Goals
1	(Uruguay) Martín Rodríguez	Irapuato	12
2	(Brazil) Alex Fernandes	Morelia	11
3	(Mexico) José Manuel Abundis	Atlante	10
4	(Mexico) Jared Borgetti	Santos Laguna	9
4	(Argentina) José Luis Calderón	Atlas	9
4	(Argentina) Walter Silvani	Pachuca	9
4	(Chile) Iván Zamorano	América	9
8	(Brazil) Claudinho	La Piedad	8
8	(Uruguay) Vicente Sánchez	Toluca	
8	(Mexico) Miguel Zepeda	Cruz Azul	

Source: MedioTiempo

== Final phase (Liguilla) ==
=== Bracket ===
Quarterfinals
1	UANL	1	3	4
8	Santos Laguna	1	0	1
4	Cruz Azul	0	4	4
5	Necaxa	2	0	2
2	Toluca	1	2	3
7	Guadalajara	1	0	1
3	Pachuca (s)	2	0	2
6	Atlante	1	1	2

Semifinals
1	UANL (s)	0	1	1
4	Cruz Azul	1	0	1
2	Toluca	1	2	3
3	Pachuca	1	4	5

Finals
1	UANL	0	1	1
3	Pachuca	2	1	3

=== Quarterfinals ===
November 28, 2001
15:00

Santos Laguna	1–1	UANL
Borgetti 58'	Report	Ochoa 76'

Estadio Corona, Torreón
Referee: José de Jesús Robles
December 1, 2001
17:00

UANL	3–0	Santos Laguna
del Olmo 75'; Ochoa 82'; Santillana 87'	Report

Estadio Universitario, San Nicolás de los Garza
Referee: Armando Archundia (Estado de México)

UANL won 4–1 on aggregate.

November 28, 2001
20:45

Guadalajara	1–1	Toluca
García 25'	Report	Morales 42'

Estadio Jalisco, Guadalajara
Referee: Marco Antonio Rodríguez (Mexico City)
December 1, 2001
15:00

Toluca	2–0	Guadalajara
Sánchez 13'; Morales 65'	Report

Estadio Nemesio Díez, Toluca
Referee: Antonio Marrufo (Chihuahua)

Toluca won 3–1 on aggregate.

November 29, 2001
19:00

Atlante	1–2	Pachuca
Paredes 47'	Report	Silvani 6', 74'

Estadio Azteca, Mexico City
Referee: Germán Arredondo Ramírez (Guanajuato)
December 2, 2001
19:00

Pachuca	0–1	Atlante
	Report	Abundis 44'

Estadio Hidalgo, Pachuca
Referee: Gilberto Alcalá Pineda (Mexico City)

2–2 on aggregate. Pachuca advanced for being the higher seeded team.

November 29, 2001
21:30

Necaxa	2–0	Cruz Azul
Pérez 38'; González 57' (pen.)	Report

Estadio Azteca, Mexico City
Referee: Eduardo Brizio Carter (Mexico City)
December 2, 2001
16:02

Cruz Azul	4–0	Necaxa
Ledesma 11'; Mendoza 45'; Campos 56'; Pinheiro 90'	Report

Estadio Azul, Mexico City
Referee: Felipe Ramos Rizo (Mexico City)

Cruz Azul won 4–2 on aggregate.

=== Semifinals ===
December 5, 2001
16:00

Cruz Azul	1–0	UANL
Ledesma 29'	Report

Estadio Azul, Mexico City
Referee: Gilberto Alcalá Pineda (Mexico City)
December 8, 2001
17:00

UANL	1–0	Cruz Azul
Suárez 51' (pen.)	Report

Estadio Universitario, San Nicolás de los Garza
Referee: Felipe Ramos Rizo (Mexico City)

1–1 on aggregate. UANL advanced for being the higher seeded team.

December 5, 2001
20:30

Pachuca	1–1	Toluca
Caballero 74'	Report	Cardozo 52'

Estadio Hidalgo, Pachuca
Referee: Antonio Marrufo (Chihuahua)
December 8, 2001
15:00

Toluca	2–4	Pachuca
Sánchez 25'; Cardozo 47'	Report	Santana 6'; Caballero 58' (pen.); Brizuela 66'; Silvani 88'

Estadio Nemesio Díez, Toluca
Referee: Armando Archundia (Estado de México)

Pachuca won 5–3 on aggregate.

=== Finals ===
December 12, 2001
20:30

Pachuca	2–0	UANL
Silvani 23'; Santana 28'	Report

Estadio Hidalgo, Pachuca
Referee: Armando Archundia (Estado de México)

First leg

Pachuca:
GK	1	(Colombia) Miguel Calero
DF	2	(Mexico) Alberto Rodríguez
DF	5	(Mexico) Francisco Gabriel de Anda
DF	99	(Mexico) Manuel Vidrio
DF	14	(Mexico) Marco Sánchez Yacuta
MF	6	(Mexico) Alfonso Sosa	(yellow card) 13'
MF	10	(Mexico) Marco Garcés		(substituted off) 60'
MF	8	(Argentina) Gabriel Caballero
MF	15	(Colombia) Andrés Chitiva	(yellow card) 71'
FW	18	(Mexico) Sergio Santana		(substituted off) 84'
FW	9	(Argentina) Walter Silvani	(yellow card) 19'
Substitutions:
GK	12	(Mexico) Jesús Alfaro
DF	16	(Mexico) Israel Velázquez
DF	26	(Mexico) José Juan Hernández
MF	13	(Mexico) Jorge Orozco
MF	28	(Mexico) Carlos Adrián Morales		(substituted on) 84'
MF	29	(Mexico) Jaime Correa
FW	11	(Paraguay) Hugo Brizuela		(substituted on) 60'
Manager:
(Mexico) Alfredo Tena

UANL:
GK	1	(Mexico) Óscar Dautt
DF	23	(Mexico) Javier Saavedra	(yellow card) 42'
DF	2	(Mexico) Claudio Suárez
DF	6	(Mexico) David Oteo
DF	3	(Mexico) Sindey Balderas
MF	13	(Mexico) Antonio Sancho	(yellow card) 21'	(substituted off) 75'
MF	8	(Mexico) Joaquín del Olmo		(substituted off) 72'
MF	18	(Brazil) Irênio	(yellow card) 8' (yellow-red card) 17'
MF	11	(Brazil) Marcelo Domingues		(substituted off) 25'
FW	9	(Mexico) Jesús Olalde
FW	29	(Mexico) Carlos Ochoa
Substitutions:
GK	25	(Mexico) Rogelio Rodríguez
DF	20	(Mexico) Hugo Sánchez
DF	21	(Bolivia) Percy Colque
MF	5	(Mexico) Mauricio Gallaga
MF	10	(Mexico) Ramón Ramírez	(yellow card) 80'	(substituted on) 25'
MF	15	(Mexico) Felipe Ayala		(substituted on) 75'
MF	19	(Mexico) Juan Montano		(substituted on) 72'
Manager:
(Brazil) Ricardo Ferretti

Second leg

December 15, 2001
17:00

UANL	1–1	Pachuca
Olalde 19'	Report	Silvani 71'

Estadio Universitario, San Nicolás de los Garza
Referee: Felipe Ramos Rizo (Mexico City)

Pachuca won 3–1 on aggregate.

Pachuca:
GK	1	(Mexico) Óscar Dautt
DF	23	(Mexico) Javier Saavedra
DF	2	(Mexico) Claudio Suárez	(yellow card) 16'
DF	6	(Mexico) David Oteo	(yellow card) 29'
DF	3	(Mexico) Sindey Balderas
MF	13	(Mexico) Antonio Sancho	(yellow card) 65'
MF	8	(Mexico) Joaquín del Olmo		(substituted off) 81'
MF	11	(Brazil) Marcelo Domingues
FW	17	(Mexico) Jorge Santillana		(substituted off) 72'
FW	9	(Mexico) Jesús Olalde	(yellow card) 41'
FW	29	(Mexico) Carlos Ochoa
Substitutions:
GK	25	(Mexico) Rogelio Rodríguez
DF	20	(Mexico) Hugo Sánchez
DF	21	(Bolivia) Percy Colque
MF	5	(Mexico) Mauricio Gallaga
MF	10	(Mexico) Ramón Ramírez		(substituted on) 72'
MF	15	(Mexico) Felipe Ayala		(substituted on) 81'
MF	19	(Mexico) Juan Montano
Manager:
(Brazil) Ricardo Ferretti

UANL:
GK	1	(Colombia) Miguel Calero	(yellow card) 36'
DF	2	(Mexico) Alberto Rodríguez
DF	5	(Mexico) Francisco Gabriel de Anda
DF	99	(Mexico) Manuel Vidrio	(yellow card) 26'
DF	14	(Mexico) Marco Sánchez Yacuta	(yellow card) 18'
MF	6	(Mexico) Alfonso Sosa	(yellow card) 27'
MF	10	(Mexico) Marco Garcés
MF	8	(Argentina) Gabriel Caballero
MF	15	(Colombia) Andrés Chitiva		(substituted off) 48'
FW	18	(Mexico) Sergio Santana
FW	9	(Argentina) Walter Silvani		(substituted off) 88'
Substitutions:
GK	12	(Mexico) Jesús Alfaro
DF	16	(Mexico) Israel Velázquez		(substituted on) 48'
DF	26	(Mexico) José Juan Hernández
MF	13	(Mexico) Jorge Orozco		(substituted on) 88'
MF	28	(Mexico) Carlos Adrián Morales
MF	29	(Mexico) Jaime Correa
FW	11	(Paraguay) Hugo Brizuela
Manager:
(Mexico) Alfredo Tena

Champions

2nd title
