= Balderas =

Balderas is a surname. Notable people with the surname include:

- Adela Balderas (born 1969), Basque university professor
- Carlos Balderas (born 1996), American boxer
- Eduardo Balderas (1907–1989), Mexican translator
- Gilberto Barragán Balderas (born 1970), a Mexican suspected drug lord
- Gustavo Adolfo González Balderas (born 1959), Mexican politician
- Hector Balderas (born 1973), American lawyer
- Mark Balderas (born 1959), Mexican keyboard player
- Ricardo Balderas (born 1993), Mexican soccer player
- Sindey Balderas (born 1976), Mexican footballer
- Víctor Alejandro Balderas (born 1967), Mexican politician
