= Marco Sánchez Yacuta =

Mexican football manager

Personal information
- Full name: Marco Antonio Sánchez Yacuta
- Date of birth: 10 May 1972 (age 54)
- Place of birth: Mexico City, Mexico
- Height: 1.72 m (5 ft 8 in)
- Position: Left-back

Team information
- Current team: Cruz Azul (women) (assistant)

Senior career*
Years	Team	Apps	(Gls)
1992–2001	América	188	(0)
1993–1994	→ UAT (loan)	2	(0)
1994–1995	→ Puebla (loan)	23	(3)
2001–2004	Pachuca	86	(1)
2005	Pachuca Juniors	19	(0)
2005–2006	Indios de Ciudad Juárez	39	(1)

International career
1996	Mexico	2	(0)

Managerial career
- 2010: Querétaro (Assistant)
- 2010: León (Assistant)
- 2011: América (assistant)
- 2011–2014: América Academy
- 2014–2016: Mexico Olympic (assistant)
- 2017: Atlante (assistant)
- 2019: UAT (assistant)
- 2019–2020: Santa Tecla
- 2021–2022: Real España (assistant)
- 2022: Cruz Azul Reserves
- 2023: Cruz Azul (Assistant)
- 2023–2024: UAT (assistant)
- 2026–: Cruz Azul (women) (assistant)
- * Club domestic league appearances and goals

Marco Antonio Sánchez Yacuta (born 10 May 1972) is a former professional Mexican footballer and manager who last played for Indios de Ciudad Juárez. He is the current assistant coach of Liga Femenil club Cruz Azul.

== Club career ==
Sánchez Yacuta began his professional career in the 1992–93 season with his hometown club Club América; he made his debut in the Mexican Primera División on October 10, 1992. In total he made nine first division appearances in that season and was loaned out to Correcaminos UAT for the following season, where he only made two appearances. He played for Puebla F.C. in the 1994–95 season, where he made 23 appearances and scored three goals.

For the 1995–96 season he was brought back to Club América, and made 179 first division appearances for them in the following six seasons.

Before the 2001–02 season he was signed by C.F. Pachuca, with whom he won the Mexican football championship for the first time (the Torneo Invierno 2001). Further titles followed in 2002 when he won the CONCACAF Champions' Cup and in 2003 with another championship title in the Apertura 2003. Sánchez made his last first division appearance on November 13, 2004 against CF Monterrey, against whom he had made his debut twelve years before.

In the first half of 2005, then 32-year-old Sánchez played a total of 19 league games for the branch team Pachuca Juniors. He ended his active career in the 2005–06 season with then second division club Indios de Ciudad Juárez.

== National team ==
In 1996, Sánchez made two test appearances for the Mexico national football team: first on February 7, 1996 in the 1-2 defeat in Chile and on May 18, 1996 in the 5-2 win against Slovakia.

== Coaching career ==
Sánchez Yacuta started his coaching career in 2010, he has been part of the technical staffs of Querétaro, León, América, Mexico Olympic, Atlante, UAT, Real España and Cruz Azul, being a frequent collaborator of Raúl Gutiérrez. In 2019, he was named the coach for Santa Tecla.

== Honours ==
Pachuca

- Mexican Primera División: Invierno 2001, Apertura 2003
- CONCACAF Champions' Cup: 2002
