= Jesús Urbina =

Mexican footballer (born 1983)

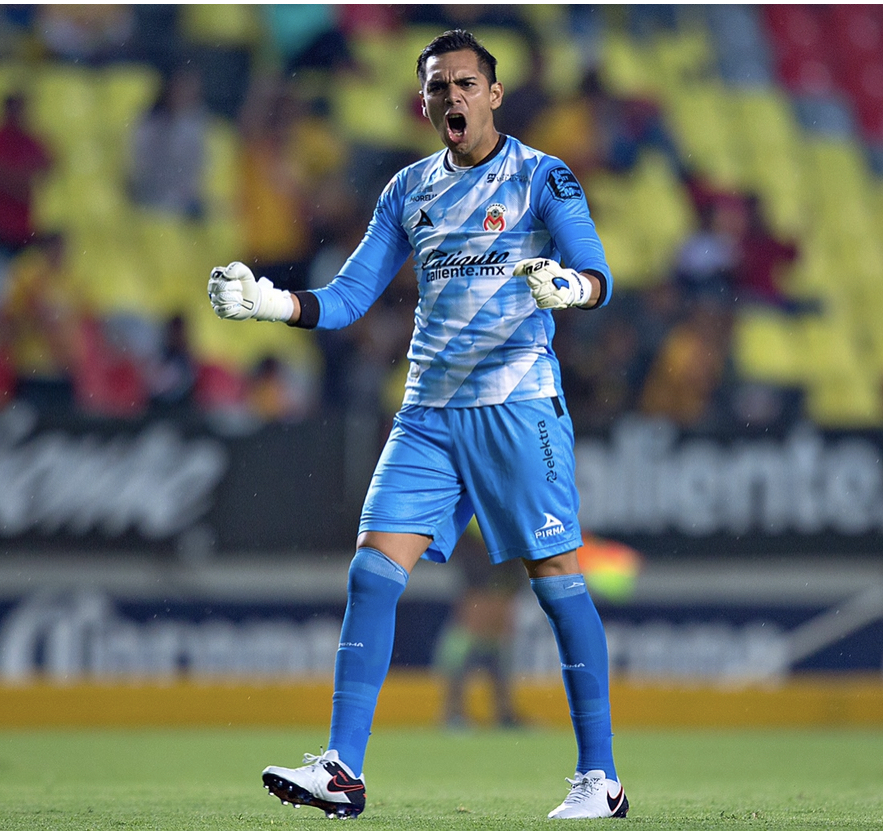

Personal information
- Full name: Jesús Yair Urbina Núñez
- Date of birth: 3 May 1983 (age 43)
- Place of birth: Monterrey, Nuevo León, Mexico
- Height: 1.85 m (6 ft 1 in)
- Position: Goalkeeper

Youth career
- Tigres UANL

Senior career*
Years	Team	Apps	(Gls)
2004–2008	Tigres UANL	1	(0)
2009	→ León (loan)	0	(0)
2009–2010	Correcaminos UAT	14	(0)
2010	→ Morelia (loan)	0	(0)
2011	→ Atlante F.C. (loan)	15	(0)
2011–2012	Toros Neza	27	(0)
2012–2013	Veracruz	23	(0)
2013–2014	Dorados	27	(0)
2013	→ Tijuana (loan)	0	(0)
2014–2015	Lobos BUAP	13	(0)
2015–2016	Juárez	4	(0)
2016–2018	Morelia	0	(0)
Total		124	(0)
- * Club domestic league appearances and goals

Jesús Yair Urbina Núñez (Note: In this Spanish name, the first or paternal surname is Urbina and the second or maternal family name is Núñez.) (born 3 May 1983) is a Mexican former professional footballer who played as a goalkeeper. He played for several teams in the Liga de Expansión MX and the Liga MX between 2008 and 2018.

== Career ==
Urbina was a graduate of Tigres UANL's youth system. He made his Primera División debut for the club's senior side in 2004, just the third Tigres goalkeeper to do so since the implementation of short tournaments in 1996.
