= Walter Silvani =

Argentine footballer

Personal information
- Full name: Walter Gustavo Silvani Ríos
- Date of birth: 11 May 1971 (age 55)
- Place of birth: Quilmes, Argentina
- Height: 1.85 m (6 ft 1 in)
- Position: Forward

Youth career
- 1983–1988: River Plate

Senior career*
Years	Team	Apps	(Gls)
1988–1996	River Plate	132	(24)
1994	→ Argentinos Juniors (loan)	17	(4)
1996	→ Universidad de Chile (loan)	21	(9)
1997	Extremadura	22	(7)
1997–2001	Salamanca	104	(18)
1997–2001	Las Palmas	27	(7)
2001–2002	Pachuca	38	(16)
2003	Al Wasl		
2003–2004	Newell's Old Boys	48	(11)
2004	Estudiantes	10	(1)
2005	Liverpool Montevideo	9	(2)

International career
1992	Argentina U23	2	(1)
- * Club domestic league appearances and goals

Walter Gustavo Silvani Ríos (born May 11, 1971) is an Argentine former footballer. He played for clubs in Argentina, Chile, Mexico, Spain, Uruguay, and United Arab Emirates. He played as an attacker.

== Teams ==
- (Argentina) River Plate 1989–1994
- (Argentina) Argentinos Juniors 1994
- (Argentina) River Plate 1995
- Universidad de Chile 1996
- (Spain) Extremadura 1997
- (Spain) Salamanca 1997–2000
- (Spain) Las Palmas 2000–2001
- (Mexico) Pachuca 2001–2002
- (United Arab Emirates) Al Wasl 2003
- (Argentina) Newell's Old Boys 2003–2004
- (Argentina) Estudiantes de La Plata 2004
- (Uruguay) Liverpool 2005

== International ==
- Argentina U23 1992

== Personal life ==
Since he was a child, Silvani is nicknamed Cuqui or Cucurucho, like the ice cream cones.

== Titles ==
- River Plate 1989–90, 1991, 1993 and 1994
- Pachuca 2001, CONCACAF Champion's Cup 2002
