= Éder Morales =

Mexican footballer (born 1983)

Personal information
- Full name: Éder Armando Morales Cortés
- Date of birth: 20 April 1983 (age 43)
- Place of birth: Morelia, Mexico
- Height: 1.88 m (6 ft 2 in)
- Position: Centre-back

Senior career*
Years	Team	Apps	(Gls)
2003	Atlético Morelia	0	(0)
2003	León	6	(0)
2005	Querétaro	12	(0)
2005	Irapuato	8	(1)
2010–2015	Atlético Morelia	0	(0)
2010	→ Mérida (loan)	7	(0)
2011–2012	→ Celaya (loan)	27	(0)
2013	→ Neza (loan)	15	(0)
2013	→ Zacatepec (loan)	8	(0)
2014–2015	→ Altamira (loan)	2	(0)
2015–2016	Oaxaca	4	(0)
2016	Belén	9	(1)
- * Club domestic league appearances and goals

Éder Armando Morales Cortés (born 20 April 1983) is a Mexican former professional footballer who played as a defender.

== Extrinsic links ==
- Éder Morales at Soccerway
