= Jehu Chiapas =

Mexican footballer (born 1985)

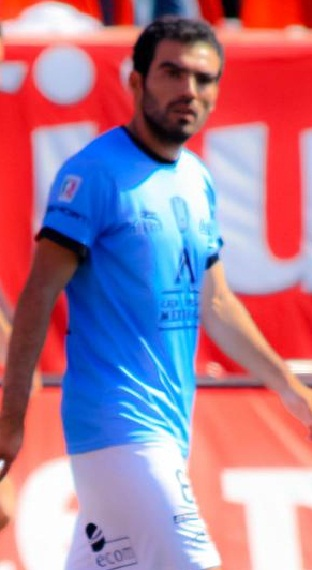
- Chiapas playing for San Luis

Personal information
- Full name: Jehu Beezye Chiapas Pérez
- Date of birth: 3 October 1985 (age 41)
- Place of birth: Martínez de la Torre, Veracruz, Mexico
- Height: 1.74 m (5 ft 9 in)
- Position: Midfielder

Senior career*
Years	Team	Apps	(Gls)
2005–2013	UNAM	168	(7)
2011–2012	→ San Luis (loan)	34	(2)
2013–2017	Veracruz	55	(3)
2015	→ Chiapas (loan)	3	(0)
2016	→ Cafetaleros (loan)	10	(1)
2018–2020	Salamanca	36	(2)
Total		306	(14)

Managerial career
- 2020–2021: Ribert
- 2021–2022: Salamanca B
- 2023–2025: Salamanca
- * Club domestic league appearances and goals

Jehu Beezye Chiapas Pérez (born 3 October 1985) is a Mexican former professional footballer who played as a midfielder. He is the current manager of Spanish club Salamanca CF UDS.

== Club career ==
Chiapas joined the Pumas youth system and worked his way through the ranks to debut in 2005. In 2011 he transferred to San Luis FC. He usually plays in the left flank of the defense and this season would try to become a regular starter.

== Honours ==
UNAM

- Mexican Primera División: Clausura 2009, Clausura 2011
