= Rogelio Rodríguez =

Mexican footballer (born 1976)

Rogelio Rodriguez (born 11 March 1976) is a former Mexican footballer.

He joined Pumas for the Apertura 2007 tournament, on a loan from his club Tigres UANL. Rodriguez has played most of his career with Tigres.

He left Pumas and joined Correcaminos UAT for the Apertura 2008–09 season.
