= Salvador Medina =

Mexican footballer (born 1988)

Personal information
- Full name: Salvador Medina Cárcamo
- Date of birth: January 27, 1988 (age 38)
- Place of birth: Distrito Federal, Mexico
- Height: 1.84 m (6 ft 1/2 in)
- Position: Defender

Senior career*
Years	Team	Apps	(Gls)
2006–2014	Pumas Morelos	56	(7)
2010	Jaguares	0	(0)
2013–2014	Ballenas Galeana Morelos	25	(0)
- * Club domestic league appearances and goals as of 8 July 2012

Salvador Medina Cárcamo (born January 27, 1988) is a former Mexican professional football defender who last played for Ballenas Galeana Morelos in the Liga de Ascenso. He made only one appearance for Pumas first team before joining Jaguares in 2009.
