= Ricardo Balderas =

Mexican footballer (born 1993)

Personal information
- Full name: Ricardo Balderas Orozco
- Date of birth: March 3, 1993 (age 33)
- Place of birth: Monterrey, Nuevo León, Mexico

Senior career*
| Years | Team | Apps | (Gls) |
| 2012–2013 | San Luis | | |
| 2013 | Chiapas | | |
| 2013–2015 | Lobos BUAP | | |
- * Club domestic league appearances and goals

Ricardo Balderas Orozco (born March 3, 1993), known as Ricardo Balderas, is a Mexican professional association football (soccer) player who plays for Atlético Veracruz.
