= Omar Trujillo =

Mexican footballer (1977–2022)

Personal information
- Full name: Gustavo Omar Trujillo Corona
- Date of birth: 9 November 1977
- Place of birth: Morelia, Mexico
- Date of death: 1 December 2022 (aged 45)
- Place of death: Morelia, Mexico
- Height: 1.73 m (5 ft 8 in)
- Position: Defender

Senior career*
Years	Team	Apps	(Gls)
1998–2012	Morelia	329	(13)
2009–2010	→ Atlas (loan)	4	(0)
2010–2011	→ Tigres UANL (loan)	5	(0)
2011–2012	→ Club Celaya (loan)	5	(0)
Total		343	(13)

International career
2005	Mexico	1	(0)
- * Club domestic league appearances and goals

Gustavo Omar Trujillo Corona (9 November 1977 – 1 December 2022) was a Mexican professional footballer who played as a defender. He spent most of his career with Monarcas Morelia.

== Club career ==
At the club level, Trujillo played for Tigres in the Primera División de México. Since Darío Franco retired in 2004, he has assumed the role of team captain. He, in turn, was replaced in that capacity by Mauricio Martín Romero during the 2009 Clausura season.

== International career ==
Trujillo earned his first and only cap for the Mexico national team on 27 April 2005, in a match against Poland.

== Honours ==
Morelia

- Primera División de México: Invierno 2000
