= Sergio Rodríguez (footballer, born August 1985) =

Mexican footballer

Personal information
- Full name: Sergio Rodríguez Muñoz
- Date of birth: 19 August 1985 (age 41)
- Place of birth: Guadalajara, Jalisco, Mexico
- Height: 1.86 m (6 ft 1 in)
- Position: Goalkeeper

Senior career*
Years	Team	Apps	(Gls)
2008–2009	Chivas de Guadalajara	9	(0)
2009–2010	→ Querétaro F.C. (loan)	?	(?)
2010–2011	Dorados de Sinaloa	?	(?)
2011–2013	Leones Negros	?	(?)
2014	Oaxaca	?	(?)
- * Club domestic league appearances and goals as of 12 June 2011

Sergio Rodríguez Muñoz (born August 19, 1985, in Guadalajara, Jalisco) is a former Mexican footballer who played as goalkeeper.

Rodríguez replaced starting goalkeeper Luis Ernesto Michel for the 2008 Primera División Apertura season, after Michel broke his forearm while playing the Superliga against Atlante. Sergio made his debut on July 28, 2008, against Cruz Azul. Never touching the ball in play, Rodríguez stopped a penalty kick from Miguel Sabah during the second minute, making the stop his first ever play in the Mexican Primera División. The future seemed promising for the young goalkeeper, as he received 17 goals in 9 games; it quickly turned sour. He allowed 5 goals in a friendly against FC Barcelona.

Rodríguez was later relegated to the bench, due to the many mistakes he made and the goals allowed. He was replaced by Víctor Hugo Hernández.
