= Ignacio Torres (footballer) =

Mexican footballer (born 1983)

Personal information
- Full name: Ignacio Torres Olvera
- Date of birth: 25 September 1983 (age 43)
- Place of birth: Mexico City, Mexico
- Height: 1.78 m (5 ft 10 in)
- Position: Midfielder

Senior career*
Years	Team	Apps	(Gls)
2003–2004	América	3	(0)
2005–2006	San Luis	6	(0)
2006	Tampico Madero	18	(4)
2006–2007	América	26	(0)
2007–2015	San Luis	146	(1)
2012	→ Atlante (loan)	1	(0)
2013–2014	→ Mérida (loan)	39	(0)
2015	→ Atlético San Luis (loan)	16	(0)
2015–2019	Celaya	114	(0)

International career
	Mexico U-20	3	(0)
- * Club domestic league appearances and goals

Ignacio Torres Olvera (born 25 September 1983) is a Mexican retired footballer, who played as a midfielder.

== Career ==
He was a member of the Mexico National Team in the FIFA U-20 World Cup hosted by the United Arab Emirates in 2003. Previously he played in the Jaibos Tampico Madero (2005–2006) on loan from América. He returned to San Luis F.C. when his loan contract ended with América.
