= Aníbal Matellán =

Argentine footballer

Personal information
- Full name: Aníbal Samuel Matellán
- Date of birth: 8 May 1977 (age 49)
- Place of birth: General Villegas, Argentina
- Height: 1.82 m (6 ft 0 in)
- Position: Defender

Senior career*
Years	Team	Apps	(Gls)
1996–2001	Boca Juniors	76	(1)
2001–2004	Schalke 04	43	(1)
2004–2005	Boca Juniors	15	(0)
2005–2006	Getafe	22	(0)
2006–2007	Gimnàstic	26	(0)
2007–2010	Arsenal de Sarandí	86	(4)
2010–2012	San Luis	57	(3)
2012–2013	Argentinos Juniors	17	(1)

Managerial career
- 2019: Boca Juniors (sports secretary)
- * Club domestic league appearances and goals

Aníbal Samuel Matellán (born 8 May 1977) is an Argentine former professional footballer who played as a defender.

== Career ==
Matellán started his career with the Argentine giants Boca Juniors, after several years of success with the club. During his time there, Boca won six major titles in five seasons: three league titles, two Copa Libertadores titles and one Intercontinental Cup. In 2001, he was transferred to the German]side, Schalke 04, and helped the team to win the DFB-Pokal in 2002.

After three seasons with Schalke 04, Matellán returned to Boca where he won another major title, the Copa Sudamericana. During his two spells with Boca, Matellán made 132 appearances for the club scoring three goals. In 2005, he signed for the Spanish side Getafe CF. However, after playing for them for just one season, he moved to the new La Liga team, Gimnàstic. After the 2006–07 season, he moved back to Argentina, signing for Arsenal de Sarandí.

Matellán headed one of the most important goals of his career on 30 November 2007 in the first leg of the Copa Sudamericana 2007 final against América to help give Arsenal a valuable 3–2 lead going into the second leg. After three years with Arsenal de Sarandí, it was announced on 14 June 2010 that he would move to the Mexican side San Luis FC.

He last played for Argentinos Juniors.

== After retirement ==
On 17 December 2018, Matellán returned to Boca Juniors in the role as a Sports Secretary. He left his position at the end of 2019.

== Honours ==
Boca Juniors

- Primera División: 1998 Apertura, 1999 Clausura, 2000 Apertura
- Copa Libertadores: 2000, 2001
- Copa Sudamericana: 2004
- Intercontinental Cup: 2000

Schalke 04

- DFB-Pokal: 2001–02
- UEFA Intertoto Cup: 2003

Arsenal de Sarandí

- Copa Sudamericana: 2007
- Suruga Bank Championship: 2008
