= Jaime Correa (footballer) =

Mexican footballer (born 1979)

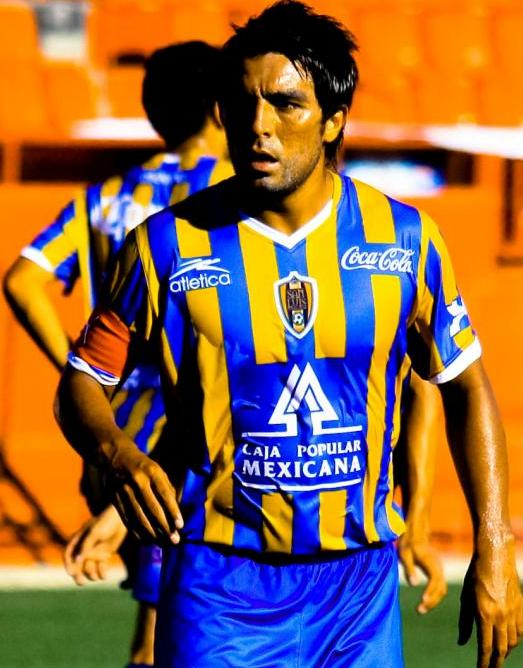
- Correa with San Luis in 2011

Personal information
- Full name: Jaime Correa Córdova
- Date of birth: 6 August 1979 (age 47)
- Place of birth: Durango, Mexico
- Height: 1.72 m (5 ft 8 in)
- Position: Midfielder

Senior career*
Years	Team	Apps	(Gls)
2001–2010	Pachuca	327	(6)
2010–2012	San Luis	60	(1)
2012	→ Necaxa (loan)	17	(1)
2013	Pachuca	4	(0)
2013	→ Correcaminos (loan)	6	(0)
2014	→ Zacatepec (loan)	4	(0)
Total		418	(8)

International career
2007–2008	Mexico	10	(0)

Managerial career
- 2015: Alto Rendimiento Tuzo (Assistant)
- 2015–2016: Pachuca Reserves and Academy
- 2019–2021: Pachuca Reserves and Academy
- 2021: Pachuca (women)
- 2022–2023: Mazatlán Reserves and Academy
- 2024–2026: Juárez Reserves and Academy
Medal record
Representing Mexico
Third place	Copa América	2007
- * Club domestic league appearances and goals

Jaime Correa Córdova (born 6 August 1979) also known as "El Alacran" (the scorpion) or "El Motor" (the motor), is a Mexican former professional footballer who played as a midfielder. He made his debut for the Mexico national team in the 2007 Copa América against Brazil (2–0 victory).

== Honours ==
Pachuca

- Mexican Primera División: Invierno 2001, Clausura 2006, Clausura 2007
- CONCACAF Champions' Cup: 2007, 2008
- Copa Sudamericana: 2006
- North American SuperLiga: 2007
