= José Joel González =

Mexican footballer (born 1979)

Personal information
- Full name: José Joel González Sandoval
- Date of birth: 27 January 1979 (age 47)
- Place of birth: Mexico City, Mexico
- Height: 1.65 m (5 ft 5 in)
- Position: Midfielder

Senior career*
Years	Team	Apps	(Gls)
2000–2002	Irapuato	?	
2002–2004	Atlante	112	(2)
2005–2006	Monterrey	63	(1)
2007	Atlante	38	(3)
2008	Monterrey	30	(1)
2009	Necaxa	15	(0)
2009– 2012	Atlante	30	(1)
2010–2011	→ Puebla (loan)	26	(1)
2011–2012	→ San Luis (loan)	27	(2)

International career^{‡}
2008	Mexico	1	(0)
- * Club domestic league appearances and goals ‡ National team caps and goals as of 16 April 2008

José Joel González Sandoval (Note: In this Spanish name, the first or paternal surname is González and the second or maternal family name is Sandoval.) (born 27 January 1979) is a Mexican former footballer.,

He started his career with Irapuato and then moved to Atlante, going on to make 112 Primera Division de Mexico appearances for them between 2002 and 2004. He then made over 60 appearances for Monterrey before returning to Atlante for the Primera División de México Clausura 2007 season. Gonzalez stayed for the Clausura and following Apertura seasons and then moved back to Monterrey where he played another 30 Primera matches. After a short spell with Necaxa he returned to Atlante for a third time.

== International Caps ==
As of 16 April 2008

International appearances
#	Date	Venue	Opponent	Result	Competition
1.	16 April 2008	Qwest Field, Seattle, United States	China	1–0	Friendly

== Honours ==
Atlante

- Apertura 2007
