= Daniel Alcántar =

Mexican footballer (born 1976)

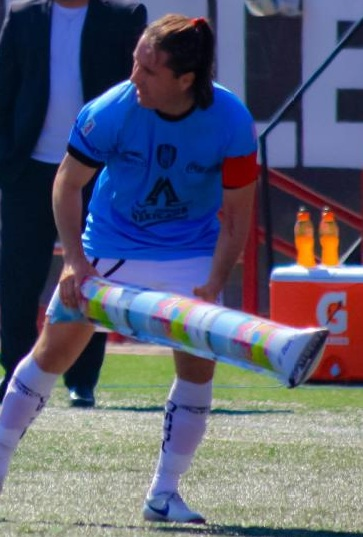
- Alcántar playing for San Luis

Personal information
- Full name: Daniel Alcántar García
- Date of birth: 2 May 1976 (age 50)
- Place of birth: León, Guanajuato, Mexico
- Height: 1.69 m (5 ft 7 in)
- Position: Right-back

Senior career*
Years	Team	Apps	(Gls)
1999–2001	León	74	(0)
2001	La Piedad	18	(0)
2002–2003	Querétaro	22	(0)
2003–2004	Irapuato	34	(1)
2004–2008	Atlante	111	(4)
2008–2010	→ Tecos (loan)	57	(3)
2010–2012	San Luis	57	(0)
2012	→ Queretaro (loan)	10	(0)
2013	→ Necaxa (loan)	11	(0)

Managerial career
- 2015: Puebla (assistant)
- 2016–2018: Lobos BUAP (assistant)
- 2018: Lobos BUAP (interim)
- 2018: Necaxa Reserves and Academy
- 2019: Murciélagos
- 2019–2020: Tecos
- 2021: UAT
- 2022: Toluca (assistant)
- 2023: Atlante (assistant)
- 2024: Atlante
- 2025–2026: Irapuato
- 2026: Jaiba Brava
- * Club domestic league appearances and goals as of 3 November 2012

Daniel Alcántar García (born 2 May 1976) is a Mexican former professional footballer, who last played for Club Necaxa. He recently was the manager of Liga de Expansión MX team Jaiba Brava.

== Honours ==
Atlante

- Mexican Primera División: Apertura 2007
