= Othoniel Arce =

Mexican footballer (born 1989)

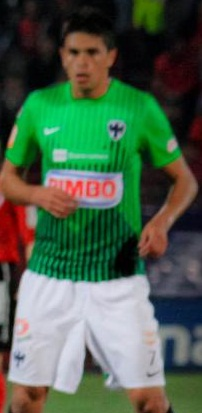
- Arce playing for Monterrey

Personal information
- Full name: Othoniel Arce Jaramillo
- Date of birth: 8 November 1989 (age 37)
- Place of birth: Tejupilco, Mexico
- Height: 1.89 m (6 ft 2 in)
- Position: Forward

Senior career*
Years	Team	Apps	(Gls)
2010–2012	San Luis	32	(4)
2012–2014	Monterrey	14	(1)
2012–2013	→ León (loan)	18	(1)
2013	→ Pachuca (loan)	10	(2)
2014–2015	Querétaro	6	(1)
2015	Lobos BUAP	8	(0)
2015–2016	Atlético San Luis	28	(13)
2016–2017	Sonora	33	(5)
2017	Necaxa	1	(0)
2018	Suchitepéquez	10	(9)
2018	Siquinalá	12	(5)
2019	Municipal	39	(14)
2020	Melgar	26	(13)
2021–2022	Ayacucho	31	(4)
2022	Malacateco	12	(2)
2023	Central Valley Fuego	13	(2)
2024	Blooming	18	(4)

International career
2011–2012	Mexico U23	6	(1)
Medal record
Representing Mexico
Pan American Games
Gold medal – first place	2011 Guadalajara	Team competition
- * Club domestic league appearances and goals

Othoniel Arce Jaramillo (born 8 November 1989) is a Mexican professional footballer who plays as a forward. His last professional club was Bolivian first division side Blooming.

== Club career ==
=== San Luis F.C. ===
He made his senior team debut on August 7, 2010, as a starter in a match against C.D. Guadalajara in a 1 - 0 loss of San Luis F.C. He scored his first goal against C.F. Pachuca in September 2010.

== Honours ==
Municipal

- Liga Nacional: Apertura 2019

Mexico U23

- Pan American Games: 2011

Individual

- Mexican Primera División Best Rookie of the tournament: Apertura 2010
