= Sindey Balderas =

Mexican footballer (born 1976)

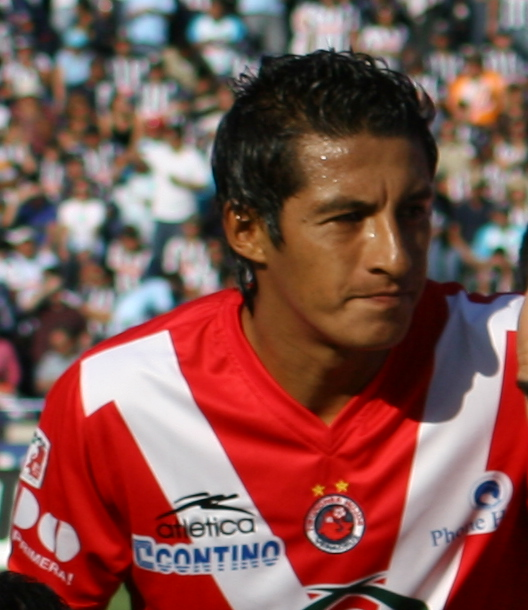
- Balderas playing for Veracruz

Personal information
- Full name: Sindey Balderas Melgar
- Date of birth: 20 June 1976 (age 50)
- Place of birth: Cuernavaca, Morelos, Mexico
- Height: 1.78 m (5 ft 10 in)
- Position: Defender

Senior career*
Years	Team	Apps	(Gls)
1999–2007	Tigres UANL	189	(6)
2007–2008	→Veracruz (loan)	26	(1)
2008–2010	→Indios (loan)	51	(1)

International career
2002	Mexico	3	(0)
- * Club domestic league appearances and goals as of July 2009

Sindey Balderas Melgar (born 20 June 1976) is a Mexican former footballer, who last played as a defender for C.F. Ciudad Juárez in Liga MX. His start with Tigres in 1999, put him under the direction of coach Ricardo Ferretti and he would represent the club in the Invierno 2001 final. He also played for Veracruz in 2007 and 2008.

== Career ==
He began playing with Tigres during the Verano 1999 season under the command of Miguel Mejía Barón, replacing Fabián Peña in the 75th minute against Tecos. Balderas scored his first league goal on 10 February 2001 in the Clásico Regiomontano (Classic Regiomontano) against Rayados after 13 minutes and had his highest-scoring season in Invierno 2001 with 4 goals, as Tigres reached the final before losing to Pachuca. After finishing Clausura 2007 with Tigres, he moved to Veracruz, but the club was relegated to Liga de Ascenso under the command of Miguel Herrera. He moved on loan to Indios de Ciudad Juarez for Apertura 2008 and played his last top-division match in the Bicentenario 2010 tournament.

Balderas also earned three caps for the Mexico national team, all of these during Javier Aguirre's time as the team's coach. His caps came at the 2002 CONCACAF Gold Cup, in Mexico's matches against El Salvador, Guatemala, and South Korea.

== See also ==
- List of people from Morelos
