= Wilmer Aguirre =

Peruvian footballer (born 1983)

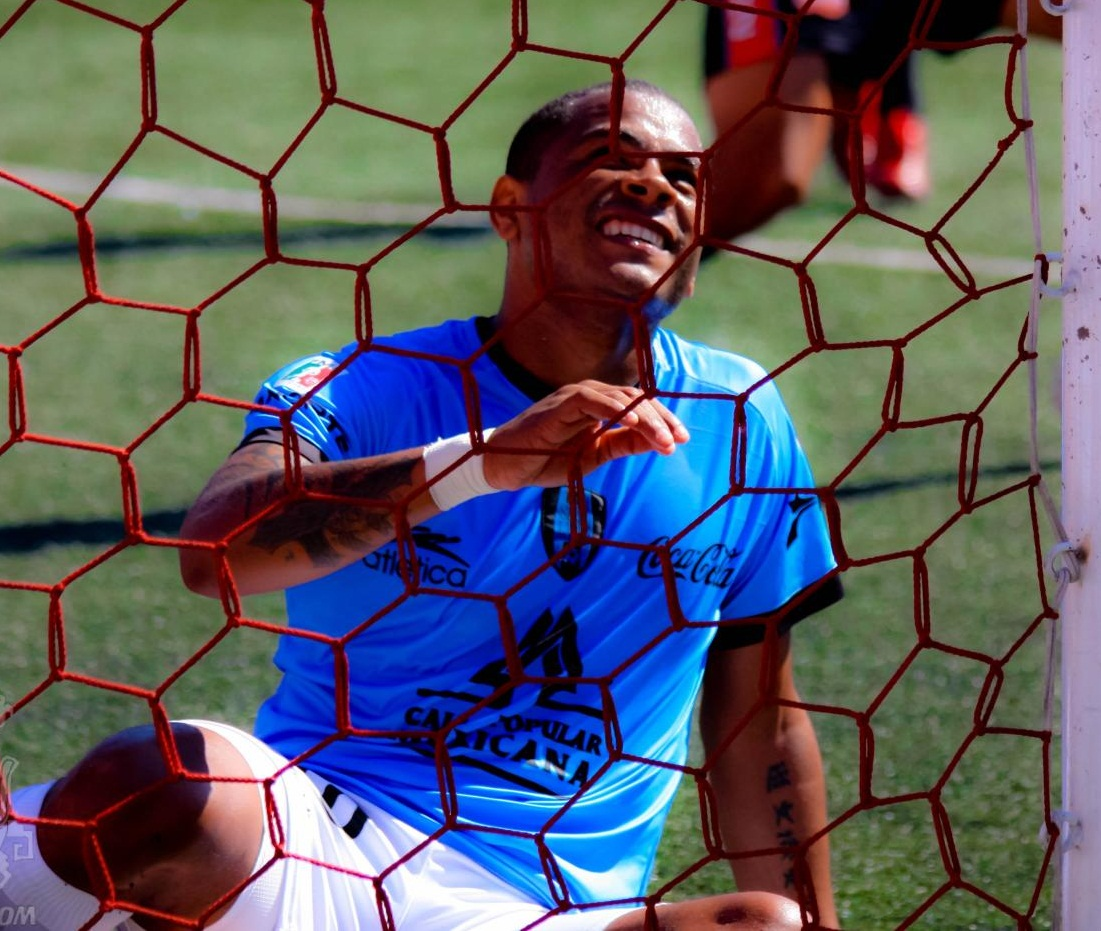
- Aguirre while playing for San Luis

Personal information
- Full name: Wilmer Alexander Aguirre Vásquez
- Date of birth: 10 May 1983 (age 43)
- Place of birth: Pisco, Peru
- Height: 1.69 m (5 ft 7 in)
- Position: Forward

Team information
- Current team: ADA Cajabamba

Senior career*
Years	Team	Apps	(Gls)
2001–2006	Alianza Lima	156	(40)
2006–2008	Metz	29	(4)
2008	→ Alianza Lima (loan)	40	(21)
2009–2010	Alianza Lima	38	(10)
2010–2013	San Luis	68	(21)
2013–2015	Alianza Lima	69	(9)
2016	Cimarrones de Sonora	6	(1)
2016	La Bocana	25	(11)
2017	Melgar	17	(0)
2017–2018	Juan Aurich	13	(7)
2018	Unión Comercio	39	(8)
2019	Ayacucho	24	(2)
2020	Santos FC		
2020	Pirata	4	(3)
2021	Alianza Lima	7	(1)
2022	Alianza Lima	25	(3)
2023	Deportivo Garcilaso	6	(0)
2023	Carlos A. Mannucci	11	(0)
2024	FC San Marcos de Huari	16	(3)
2024	FC Cajamarca		
2025	Juventus Huamachuco	15	(7)
2025–	ADA Cajabamba		

International career
2006–2012	Peru	8	(0)
- * Club domestic league appearances and goals as of 19:52, 2 February 2023 (UTC)

Wilmer Alexander Aguirre Vásquez (born 5 October 1983) is a Peruvian footballer who currently plays for ADA Cajabamba, a team that competes in the Copa Perú (4th division).

== Career ==
Aguirre began his career in the youth side for Alianza Lima and joined in January 2002 on loan to Atlas Guadalajara. After eleven months on loan in Mexico returned in December 2002 to his club Alianza Lima. After another three years for Alianza Lima left in summer 2006 Peru to sign for Ligue 2 club FC Metz. He scored only 4 goals in 29 matches in two seasons and returned 2008 on loan to his youthclub Alianza Lima. After a good season for Alianza Lima which scored 18 goals in 40 games, his club Alianza Lima pulled the sold option from him by his club FC Metz. On 25 May 2010 the 27-year-old forward "El Zorrito" left Alianza Lima to sign a three-year deal with San Luis de Potosì.

In January 2018, Aguirre joined Unión Comercio. A year later, he joined Ayacucho FC. He left the club at the end of the year. On 24 February 2020, Aguirre signed with Peruvian Segunda División club Santos FC.

== Honours ==
Alianza Lima

- Peruvian Primera División (6): 2001, 2003, 2004, 2004, 2021, 2022
- Copa Inca: 2014

Metz

- Ligue 2: 2006–07

FBC Melgar

- Torneo de Verano: 2017

FC Cajamarca

- Copa Perú: 2024

Peru U18

- Bolivarian Games: 2001
