= Christian Sánchez (footballer) =

Mexican footballer (born 1989)

Personal information
- Full name: Christian Emmanuel Sánchez Narváez
- Date of birth: 4 April 1989 (age 37)
- Place of birth: Guadalajara, Jalisco, Mexico
- Height: 1.80 m (5 ft 11 in)
- Position: Defender

Youth career
- Academicos

Senior career*
Years	Team	Apps	(Gls)
2005–2007	Atlas	1	(0)
2008–2009	Chiapas	17	(0)
2009	Santos Laguna	5	(0)
2010	Morelia	17	(1)
2010–2012	San Luis	31	(1)
2012	Atlas	3	(0)
2013–2014	Tecos	33	(1)
2014–2015	Zacatecas	14	(0)
2015–2016	Oaxaca	14	(0)
2017	Loros UdeC	13	(0)
2018	Malacateco		
2020	Jaguares de Jalisco	0	(0)
2021	Verdes	0	(0)

International career
2005	Mexico U17	9	(0)
2007–2009	Mexico U20	4	(0)
2011	Mexico U23	5	(0)
Medal record
Men's football
Representing Mexico
FIFA U-17 World Cup
Winner	2005 Peru
- * Club domestic league appearances and goals

Christian Emmanuel Sánchez Narváez (Note: In this Spanish name, the first or paternal surname is Sánchez and the second or maternal family name is Narváez.) (born 4 April 1989) is a Mexican former football defender. Sánchez was a member of the 2005 FIFA U-17 World Championship squad that won the championship. Sánchez was transferred to Monarcas Morelia on 14 December 2009, but was released after the season.

== Honours ==
Mexico U17

- FIFA U-17 World Championship: 2005
