= 2005–06 Toluca FC season =

Toluca
2005–06 season
- Chairman: Rafael Lebrija
- Manager: Américo Gallego
- Stadium: Estadio Nemesio Díez
- Apertura: Winners (5th)
- Clausura: Semifinals (6th)
- CONCACAF Champions' Cup: Runners-up
- Top goalscorer: League: Vicente Sánchez; Israel López (10 goals); All: Vicente Sánchez; Carlos Esquivel (11 goals)
- Biggest win: Monterrey 0–3 Toluca (18 December 2005)
- Biggest defeat: Santos Laguna 4–1 Toluca (20 November 2005)
| Home colours | Away colours |

The 2005–06 season was Toluca's 88th season in existence and their 53rd consecutive season in the top flight of Mexican football. The club participated in the Apertura and Torneo Clausura tournaments of the Mexican Primera División and in the 2006 CONCACAF Champions' Cup.

Toluca won the Torneo Apertura after defeating Monterrey on the final, but failed to achieve the championship for the Torneo Clausura after being eliminated by San Luis in the semifinals. Internationally, Toluca were runners-up of the CONCACAF Champions' Cup, losing in the final against América.

This season was also Toluca's first season under Argentine Américo Gallego as manager, who achieved to win the Mexican Primera División title in his first season with the club.

== Coaching staff ==
| Position | Name |
|---|---|
| Manager | (Argentina) Américo Gallego |
| Assistant coach | (Argentina) Ángel Bernuncio |
| Fitness coach | (Argentina) Jorge Fleitas |
| Doctors | (Mexico) José Luis Serrano |
| Doctors | (Mexico) Rodrigo López |
| Masseur | (Mexico) Juan Martínez |

== Players ==
=== Apertura ===
| No. | Pos. | Nat. | Name | Date of birth (age) | Since |
|---|---|---|---|---|---|
| 1 | GK | (Argentina) | Hernán Cristante | 16 September 1969 (aged 35) | 1993 |
| 2 | DF | (Mexico) | Mario Méndez | 1 June 1979 (aged 26) | 2004 |
| 3 | DF | (Paraguay) | Paulo da Silva (Captain) | 1 February 1980 (aged 25) | 2003 |
| 4 | MF | (Argentina) | Ariel Rosada | 11 April 1978 (aged 27) | 2005 |
| 5 | MF | (Mexico) | Israel López (Vice-captain) | 29 September 1974 (aged 30) | 2002 |
| 6 | DF | (Mexico) | Manuel de la Torre | 13 June 1980 (aged 25) | 2004 |
| 7 | MF | (Argentina) | Rodrigo Díaz | 28 August 1981 (aged 23) | 2005 |
| 8 | MF | (Mexico) | Erik Espinosa | 13 January 1980 (aged 25) | 2000 |
| 9 | FW | (Uruguay) | Pablo Granoche | 5 September 1983 (aged 21) | 2005 |
| 10 | MF | (Mexico) | Sinha | 23 May 1976 (aged 29) | 1999 |
| 11 | FW | (Uruguay) | Vicente Sánchez | 7 December 1979 (aged 25) | 2001 |
| 12 | GK | (Mexico) | César Lozano | 31 May 1977 (aged 28) | 2004 |
| 13 | DF | (Mexico) | Miguel Almazán | 6 May 1982 (aged 23) | 2002 |
| 14 | DF | (Mexico) | Édgar Dueñas | 5 March 1983 (aged 22) | 2004 |
| 15 | MF | (Mexico) | Josué Castillejos | 14 April 1981 (aged 24) | 2002 |
| 16 | MF | (Mexico) | Sergio Amaury Ponce | 13 August 1981 (aged 23) | 2001 |
| 17 | DF | (Mexico) | Hassan Viades | 10 January 1978 (aged 27) | 1999 |
| 19 | FW | (Mexico) | Uzziel Lozano | 27 November 1981 (aged 23) | 2000 |
| 22 | DF | (Mexico) | Juan Carlos Núñez | 18 April 1983 (aged 22) | 2004 |
| 23 | FW | (Mexico) | José Manuel Abundis | 11 June 1973 (aged 32) | 2004 |
| 24 | DF | (Mexico) | José Manuel Cruzalta | 8 April 1978 (aged 27) | 2001 |
| 25 | DF | (Mexico) | Edgar García | 24 May 1980 (aged 25) | 2005 |
| 29 | MF | (Mexico) | Carlos Esquivel | 10 April 1982 (aged 23) | 2005 |
| 30 | DF | (Mexico) | Adalberto Palma | 3 February 1981 (aged 24) | 2005 |
| 43 | FW | (Mexico) | Ismael Valadez | 14 September 1985 (aged 19) | 2004 |
| 51 | DF | (Mexico) | Francisco Gamboa | 20 July 1985 (aged 20) | 2005 |

Note: Flags indicate national team as has been defined under FIFA eligibility rules. Players may hold more than one non-FIFA nationality.
Ordered by squad number.

=== Clausura ===
| No. | Pos. | Nat. | Name | Date of birth (age) | Since |
|---|---|---|---|---|---|
| 1 | GK | (Argentina) | Hernán Cristante | 16 September 1969 (aged 36) | 1993 |
| 3 | DF | (Paraguay) | Paulo da Silva (Captain) | 1 February 1980 (aged 25) | 2003 |
| 4 | MF | (Argentina) | Ariel Rosada | 11 April 1978 (aged 27) | 2005 |
| 5 | MF | (Mexico) | Israel López | 29 September 1974 (aged 31) | 2002 |
| 6 | DF | (Mexico) | Manuel de la Torre | 13 June 1980 (aged 25) | 2004 |
| 7 | MF | (Argentina) | Rodrigo Díaz | 28 August 1981 (aged 24) | 2005 |
| 8 | MF | (Mexico) | Erik Espinosa | 13 January 1980 (aged 26) | 2000 |
| 10 | MF | (Mexico) | Sinha | 23 May 1976 (aged 29) | 1999 |
| 11 | FW | (Uruguay) | Vicente Sánchez | 7 December 1979 (aged 26) | 2001 |
| 12 | GK | (Mexico) | César Lozano | 31 May 1977 (aged 28) | 2004 |
| 13 | DF | (Mexico) | Miguel Almazán | 6 May 1982 (aged 23) | 2002 |
| 14 | DF | (Mexico) | Édgar Dueñas | 5 March 1983 (aged 22) | 2004 |
| 15 | MF | (Mexico) | Josué Castillejos | 14 April 1981 (aged 24) | 2002 |
| 16 | MF | (Mexico) | Sergio Amaury Ponce | 13 August 1981 (aged 24) | 2001 |
| 17 | DF | (Mexico) | Hassan Viades | 10 January 1978 (aged 28) | 1999 |
| 19 | FW | (Mexico) | Uzziel Lozano | 27 November 1981 (aged 24) | 2000 |
| 21 | MF | (Mexico) | Diego de la Torre | 5 February 1984 (aged 21) | 2004 |
| 22 | DF | (Mexico) | Juan Carlos Núñez | 18 April 1983 (aged 22) | 2004 |
| 23 | FW | (Mexico) | José Manuel Abundis | 11 June 1973 (aged 32) | 2004 |
| 24 | DF | (Mexico) | José Manuel Cruzalta | 8 April 1978 (aged 27) | 2001 |
| 25 | DF | (Mexico) | Edgar García | 24 May 1980 (aged 25) | 2005 |
| 29 | FW | (Mexico) | Carlos Esquivel | 10 April 1982 (aged 23) | 2005 |
| 36 | MF | (Mexico) | Jorge Oropeza | 4 May 1983 (aged 22) | 2006 |
| 37 | FW | (Mexico) | Iván Castillejos | 24 July 1984 (aged 21) | 2006 |
| 43 | FW | (Mexico) | Ismael Valadez | 14 September 1985 (aged 20) | 2004 |
| 51 | DF | (Mexico) | Francisco Gamboa | 20 July 1985 (aged 20) | 2005 |

Note: Flags indicate national team as has been defined under FIFA eligibility rules. Players may hold more than one non-FIFA nationality.
Ordered by squad number.

== Transfers ==
=== In ===
| No. | Pos. | Nat. | Player | Moving from | Type | Transfer window | Ref. |
|---|---|---|---|---|---|---|---|
| 4 | MF | (Argentina) | Ariel Rosada | (Argentina) Newell's Old Boys | Transfer | Summer | |
| 7 | MF | (Argentina) | Rodrigo Díaz | (Argentina) Lanús | Transfer | Summer | |
| 9 | FW | (Uruguay) | Pablo Granoche | (Uruguay) Miramar Misiones | Transfer | Summer | |
| 29 | MF | (Mexico) | Carlos Esquivel | Atlético Mexiquense | Promoted | Summer | |
| 30 | DF | (Mexico) | Adalberto Palma | Atlante | Transfer | Summer | |

=== Out ===
| No. | Pos. | Nat. | Player | Moving to | Type | Transfer window | Ref. |
|---|---|---|---|---|---|---|---|
| 9 | FW | (Paraguay) | José Cardozo | (Argentina) San Lorenzo | Transfer | Summer | |
| 2 | DF | (Mexico) | Mario Méndez | Monterrey | Transfer | Winter | |
| 9 | FW | (Uruguay) | Pablo Granoche | Veracruz | Transfer | Winter | |
| 30 | DF | (Mexico) | Adalberto Palma | Atlético Mexiquense | Transfer | Winter | |

== Competitions ==
=== Overview ===
| Competition | First match | Last match | Starting round | Final position | Record | | | | | | | |
| Competition | First match | Last match | Starting round | Final position | Pld | W | D | L | GF | GA | GD | Win % |
|---|---|---|---|---|---|---|---|---|---|---|---|---|
| Apertura | 30 July 2005 | 18 December 2005 | Matchday 1 | Winners | 23 | 12 | 6 | 5 | 36 | 25 | +11 | 52.17 |
| Clausura | 21 January 2006 | 13 May 2006 | Matchday 1 | Semifinals (6th) | 21 | 8 | 4 | 9 | 27 | 25 | +2 | 38.10 |
| CONCACAF Champions' Cup | 22 February 2006 | 19 April 2006 | Quarterfinals | Runner-ups | 6 | 3 | 1 | 2 | 9 | 6 | +3 | 50.00 |
| Total | | | | | 50 | 23 | 11 | 16 | 72 | 56 | +16 | 46.00 |

Source: Mediotiempo.com

=== Torneo Apertura ===
==== League table ====
| Pos | Team | Pld | W | D | L | GF | GA | GD | Pts | Qualification |
|---|---|---|---|---|---|---|---|---|---|---|
| 3 | Necaxa | 17 | 9 | 4 | 4 | 35 | 31 | +4 | 31 | Automatically qualified for the Liguilla (Playoffs) |
| 4 | Cruz Azul | 17 | 9 | 3 | 5 | 34 | 20 | +14 | 30 | Automatically qualified for the Liguilla (Playoffs) |
| 5 | Toluca | 17 | 9 | 3 | 5 | 27 | 21 | +6 | 30 | Automatically qualified for the Liguilla (Playoffs) |
| 6 | Pachuca | 17 | 7 | 7 | 3 | 26 | 18 | +8 | 28 | Automatically qualified for the Liguilla (Playoffs) |
| 7 | UAG | 17 | 7 | 3 | 7 | 27 | 28 | −1 | 24 | Qualified for Liguilla (Playoffs) on a points basis |

Source: MedioTiempo

==== Matches ====
| 30 July 2005 1 | Necaxa | 0–0 | Toluca | Aguascalientes City, Aguascalientes |
| 20:00 | | Report | | Stadium: Estadio Victoria; Attendance: 20,000 |

| 6 August 2005 2 | Toluca | 2–1 | San Luis | Toluca, State of Mexico |
| 15:00 | Díaz 30'; Granoche 89' | Report | Giménez 54' | Stadium: Estadio Nemesio Díez; Referee: Paul Delgadillo |

| 13 August 2005 3 | Veracruz | 2–3 | Toluca | Boca del Río, Veracruz |
| 19:00 | Biscayzacú 6'; Mora 86' | Report | de la Torre 33'; Abundis 53'; Esquivel 79' | Stadium: Estadio Luis "Pirata" Fuente; Referee: Marco Antonio Rodríguez |

| 20 August 2005 4 | Toluca | 2–1 | Cruz Azul | Toluca, State of Mexico |
| 15:00 | Abundis 30'; Sánchez 80' | Report | Restrepo 87' | Stadium: Estadio Nemesio Díez; Referee: Adolfo Aquino |

| 24 August 2005 5 | Monterrey | 2–1 | Toluca | Monterrey, Nuevo León |
| 21:00 | Baloy 1', 10' | Report | Abundis 29' | Stadium: Estadio Tecnológico; Referee: Gilberto Alcalá |

| 27 August 2005 6 | Toluca | 1–1 | Pachuca | Toluca, State of Mexico |
| 15:00 | Sánchez 47' | Report | Cacho 63' | Stadium: Estadio Nemesio Díez; Referee: Germán Arredondo |

| 10 September 2005 7 | Morelia | 3–1 | Toluca | Morelia, Michoacán |
| 19:00 | Álvarez 41'; Trujillo 44'; Rey 74' | Report | López 54' | Stadium: Estadio Morelos; Referee: José Abramo Lira |

| 17 September 2005 8 | Toluca | 2–1 | Atlas | Toluca, State of Mexico |
| 15:00 | López 28'; Fuentes 67' (o.g.) | Report | Macedo 29' | Stadium: Estadio Nemesio Díez; Referee: Francisco Chacón |

| 25 September 2005 9 | UAG | 1–2 | Toluca | Zapopan, Jalisco |
| 16:00 | Pinto 83' | Report | Valadez 36'; López 85' | Stadium: Estadio Tres de Marzo; Referee: José Gabriel Gómez |

| 28 September 2005 10 | Toluca | 0–1 | América | Toluca, State of Mexico |
| 15:00 | | Report | Kléber 40' | Stadium: Estadio Nemesio Díez; Referee: Germán Arredondo |

| 1 October 2005 11 | Toluca | 0–1 | Chiapas | Toluca, State of Mexico |
| 15:00 | | Report | Cabañas 44' | Stadium: Estadio Nemesio Díez; Referee: Gilberto Alcalá |

| 16 October 2005 12 | UNAM | 0–3 | Toluca | Coyoacán, Mexico City |
| 12:00 | | Report | Granoche 51'; Sánchez 71'; de la Torre 73' | Stadium: Estadio Olímpico Universitario; Referee: Manuel Glower |

| 22 October 2005 13 | Toluca | 1–0 | Atlante | Toluca, State of Mexico |
| 15:00 | Díaz 63' | Report | | Stadium: Estadio Nemesio Díez; Referee: Hugo León Guajardo |

| 29 October 2005 14 | UANL | 1–3 | Toluca | San Nicolás de los Garza, Nuevo León |
| 19:00 | Silvera 81' | Report | Sinha 11'; Abundis 84'; Esquivel 88' | Stadium: Estadio Universitario; Referee: Adolfo Aquino |

| 5 November 2005 15 | Toluca | 2–2 | Sinaloa | Toluca, State of Mexico |
| 15:00 | Sinha 31'; Abundis 34' | Report | Orozco 76'; Abreu 86' | Stadium: Estadio Nemesio Díez; Referee: José Gabriel Gómez |

| 20 November 2005 16 | Santos Laguna | 4–1 | Toluca | Torreón, Coahuila |
| 16:00 | Ruiz 21'; Vuoso 24', 84', 88' | Report | Lozano 89' | Stadium: Estadio Corona; Referee: José Abramo Lira |

| 26 November 2005 17 | Toluca | 3–0 | Guadalajara | Toluca, State of Mexico |
| 15:00 | López 16'; Díaz 70'; Méndez 88' | Report | | Stadium: Estadio Nemesio Díez; Referee: Marco Antonio Rodríguez |

==== Playoffs ====
===== Quarterfinals =====
| 1 December 2005 First leg | Toluca | 1–0 | Cruz Azul | Toluca, State of Mexico |
| 15:00 | Esquivel 62' | Report | | Stadium: Estadio Nemesio Díez; Referee: Gilberto Alcalá |

| 4 December 2005 Second leg | Cruz Azul | 0–0 (0–1 agg.) | Toluca | Benito Juárez, Mexico City |
| 20:00 | | Report | | Stadium: Estadio Azul; Referee: Manuel Glower |

===== Semifinals =====
| 8 December 2005 First leg | Pachuca | 0–0 | Toluca | Pachuca, Hidalgo |
| 20:45 | | Report | | Stadium: Estadio Hidalgo; Referee: Jorge Gasso |

| 11 December 2005 Second leg | Toluca | 2–1 (2–1 agg.) | Pachuca | Toluca, State of Mexico |
| 15:00 | da Silva 10'; Esquivel 42' | Report | Santana 33' | Stadium: Estadio Nemesio Díez; Referee: Marco Antonio Rodríguez |

===== Final =====
| 15 December 2005 First leg | Toluca | 3–3 | Monterrey | Toluca, State of Mexico |
| 15:00 | Sánchez 32'; Abundis 44'; Díaz 87' | Report | Pérez 2'; Casartelli 8'; da Silva 61' (o.g.) | Stadium: Estadio Nemesio Díez; Referee: Gilberto Alcalá |

| 4 December 2005 Second leg | Monterrey | 0–3 (3–6 agg.) | Toluca | Monterrey, Nuevo León |
| 20:00 | | Report | Sánchez 50', 88'; Díaz 89' | Stadium: Estadio Tecnológico; Referee: Marco Antonio Rodríguez |

=== Torneo Clausura ===
==== League table ====
| Pos | Team | Pld | W | D | L | GF | GA | GD | Pts | Qualification |
|---|---|---|---|---|---|---|---|---|---|---|
| 4 | Atlante | 17 | 8 | 3 | 6 | 19 | 15 | +4 | 27 | Automatically qualified for the Liguilla (Playoffs) |
| 5 | San Luis | 17 | 7 | 4 | 6 | 23 | 19 | +4 | 25 | Automatically qualified for the Liguilla (Playoffs) |
| 6 | Toluca | 17 | 7 | 3 | 7 | 22 | 19 | +3 | 24 | Automatically qualified for the Liguilla (Playoffs) |
| 7 | Guadalajara | 17 | 6 | 5 | 6 | 19 | 26 | −7 | 23 | Qualified for Liguilla (Playoffs) on a points basis |
| 8 | Sinaloa | 17 | 4 | 10 | 3 | 24 | 24 | 0 | 22 | |

Source: MedioTiempo

==== Matches ====
| 21 January 2006 1 | Toluca | 3–1 | Necaxa | Toluca, State of Mexico |
| 15:00 | de la Torre 20'; Esquivel 44'; Sánchez 89' | Report | Moreno 88' | Stadium: Estadio Nemesio Díez; Referee: Adolfo Aquino |

| 29 January 2006 2 | San Luis | 1–3 | Toluca | San Luis Potosí City, San Luis Potosí |
| 12:00 | González 66' | Report | Sánchez 38'; López 56', 76' | Stadium: Estadio Alfonso Lastras; Referee: José Abramo Lira |

| 1 February 2006 3 | Toluca | 2–1 | Veracruz | Toluca, State of Mexico |
| 15:00 | López 8'; Esquivel 50' | Report | Biscayzacú 79' | Stadium: Estadio Nemesio Díez; Referee: Armando Archundia |

| 4 February 2006 4 | Cruz Azul | 2–1 | Toluca | Benito Juárez, Mexico City |
| 17:00 | Fonseca 32'; Pereyra 71' | Report | Esquivel 26' | Stadium: Estadio Azul; Referee: Diego Camara |

| 11 February 2006 5 | Toluca | 0–1 | Monterrey | Toluca, State of Mexico |
| 15:00 | | Report | Peralta 68' | Stadium: Estadio Nemesio Díez; Referee: Germán Arredondo |

| 19 February 2006 6 | Pachuca | 1–0 | Toluca | Pachuca, Hidalgo |
| 16:00 | L. López 46' | Report | | Stadium: Estadio Hidalgo; Referee: Marco Antonio Rodríguez |

| 25 February 2006 7 | Toluca | 2–3 | Morelia | Toluca, State of Mexico |
| 15:00 | Sinha 15'; Díaz 19' | Report | Álvarez 6'; Rey 39', 58' | Stadium: Estadio Nemesio Díez; Referee: Jorge Gasso |

| 4 March 2006 8 | Atlas | 0–1 | Toluca | Guadalajara, Jalisco |
| 20:45 | | Report | López 88' | Stadium: Estadio Jalisco; Referee: Armando Archundia |

| 11 March 2006 9 | Toluca | 3–1 | UAG | Toluca, State of Mexico |
| 15:00 | Dueñas 13'; López 16'; Sánchez 38' | Report | Ludueña 30' | Stadium: Estadio Nemesio Díez; Referee: Mauricio Morales |

| 15 March 2006 10 | América | 1–0 | Toluca | Tlalpan, Mexico City |
| 20:00 | C. López 50' | Report | | Stadium: Estadio Azteca; Referee: Adolfo Aquino |

| 18 March 2006 11 | Chiapas | 2–0 | Toluca | Tuxtla Gutiérrez, Chiapas |
| 15:00 | Cabañas 15'; Jiménez 67' | Report | | Stadium: Estadio Víctor Manuel Reyna; Referee: Marco Antonio Rodríguez |

| 26 March 2006 12 | Toluca | 2–1 | UNAM | Toluca, State of Mexico |
| 12:00 | Díaz 22'; da Silva 75' | Report | Beltrán 56' | Stadium: Estadio Nemesio Díez; Referee: José Abramo Lira |

| 1 April 2006 13 | Atlante | 0–0 | Toluca | Tlalpan, Mexico City |
| 17:00 | | Report | | Stadium: Estadio Azteca; Referee: Manuel Glower |

| 8 April 2006 14 | Toluca | 1–1 | UANL | Toluca, State of Mexico |
| 15:00 | Ponce 5' | Report | Gaitán 89' | Stadium: Estadio Nemesio Díez; Referee: Paul Delgadillo |

| 15 April 2006 15 | Sinaloa | 1–1 | Toluca | Culiacán, Sinaloa |
| 21:00 | Abreu 55' | Report | Valadez 16' | Stadium: Estadio Carlos González y González; Referee: Francisco Javier Caspeta |

| 23 April 2006 16 | Toluca | 1–2 | Santos Laguna | Toluca, State of Mexico |
| 12:00 | Esquivel 2' | Report | Ruiz 81', 89' | Stadium: Estadio Nemesio Díez; Referee: Marco Antonio Rodríguez |

| 29 April 2006 17 | Guadalajara | 0–2 | Toluca | Guadalajara, Jalisco |
| 19:00 | | Report | I. Castillejos 69', 89' | Stadium: Estadio Jalisco; Referee: Hugo León Guajardo |

==== Playoffs ====
===== Quarterfinals =====
| 3 May 2006 First leg | Toluca | 2–1 | Cruz Azul | Toluca, State of Mexico |
| 15:00 | Valadez 9'; Sánchez 44' | Report | Villaluz 81' | Stadium: Estadio Nemesio Díez; Referee: Jorge Gasso |

| 6 May 2006 Second leg | Cruz Azul | 1–1 (2–3 agg.) | Toluca | Benito Juárez, Mexico City |
| 17:00 | Sabah 90+2' | Report | Caniza 7' (o.g.) | Stadium: Estadio Azul; Referee: Armando Archundia |

===== Semifinals =====
| 10 May 2006 First leg | Toluca | 1–2 | San Luis | Toluca, State of Mexico |
| 15:00 | Abundis 75' | Report | Olmedo 41'; Reyna 62' | Stadium: Estadio Nemesio Díez; Referee: Mauricio Morales |

| 13 May 2006 Second leg | San Luis | 2–1 (4–2 agg.) | Toluca | San Luis Potosí City, San Luis Potosí |
| 20:30 | Reyna 18'; Valdez 50' | Report | López 51' | Stadium: Estadio Alfonso Lastras; Referee: Marco Antonio Rodríguez |

=== CONCACAF Champions' Cup ===
==== Knockout phase ====
===== Quarterfinals =====
| 22 February 2006 First leg | Olimpia (Honduras) | 0–2 | (Mexico) Toluca | San Pedro Sula, Honduras |
| | | | Díaz 24'; Cruzalta 90' | Stadium: Estadio Olímpico Metropolitan; Referee: Brian Hall (United States) |

| 8 March 2006 Second leg | Toluca (Mexico) | 2–1 (4–1 agg.) | (Honduras) Olimpia | Toluca, Mexico |
| | Rosada 47'; Esquivel 53' | | Cárcamo 21' | Stadium: Estadio Nemesio Díez; Referee: Kevin Stott (United States) |

===== Semifinals =====
| 22 March 2006 First leg | Toluca (Mexico) | 2–0 | (Costa Rica) Saprissa | Toluca, Mexico |
| | Esquivel 22', 62' | | | Stadium: Estadio Nemesio Díez; Referee: Terry Vaughn (United States) |

| 29 March 2006 Second leg | Saprissa (Costa Rica) | 3–2 (3–4 agg.) | (Mexico) Toluca | San José, Costa Rica |
| | Azofeifa 46'; Saborío 58'; Drummond 90' | | Valadez 60'; Sánchez 87' | Stadium: Estadio Ricardo Saprissa Aymá; Referee: Peter Prendergast (Jamaica) |

===== Final =====
| 12 April 2006 First leg | Toluca (Mexico) | 0–0 | (Mexico) América | Toluca, Mexico |
| | | Report | | Stadium: Estadio Nemesio Díez; Attendance: 20,000; Referee: José Pineda (Honduras) |

| 19 April 2006 Second leg | América (Mexico) | 2–1 (a.e.t.) (2–1 agg.) | (Mexico) Toluca | Mexico City, Mexico |
| | Kléber 105'; Davino 115' | Report | da Silva 93' | Stadium: Estadio Azteca; Attendance: 35,920; Referee: Brian Hall (United States) |

== Statistics ==
=== Appearances and goals ===
| No. | Pos. | Player | Total | | Apertura | | Clausura | | Champions' Cup | |
| No. | Pos. | Player | Apps | Goals | Apps | Goals | Apps | Goals | Apps | Goals |
|---|---|---|---|---|---|---|---|---|---|---|
| 1 | GK | (Argentina) Hernán Cristante | 35 | 0 | 19 | 0 | 12 | 0 | 4 | 0 |
| 3 | DF | (Paraguay) Paulo da Silva | 48 | 4 | 23 | 1 | 21 | 1 | 4 | 1 |
| 4 | MF | (Argentina) Ariel Rosada | 43 | 1 | 20 | 0 | 17 | 0 | 6 | 1 |
| 5 | MF | (Mexico) Israel López | 33 | 10 | 19 | 4 | 14 | 6 | 0 | 0 |
| 6 | DF | (Mexico) Manuel de la Torre | 47 | 3 | 23 | 2 | 20 | 1 | 4 | 0 |
| 7 | MF | (Argentina) Rodrigo Díaz | 42 | 8 | 20 | 5 | 16 | 2 | 6 | 1 |
| 8 | MF | (Mexico) Erik Espinosa | 12 | 0 | 4 | 0 | 5 | 0 | 4 | 0 |
| 10 | MF | (Mexico) Sinha | 28 | 3 | 21 | 2 | 7 | 1 | 0 | 0 |
| 11 | FW | (Uruguay) Vicente Sánchez | 44 | 11 | 19 | 6 | 21 | 4 | 4 | 1 |
| 12 | GK | (Mexico) César Lozano | 15 | 0 | 4 | 0 | 9 | 0 | 2 | 0 |
| 13 | DF | (Mexico) Miguel Almazán | 23 | 0 | 8 | 0 | 10 | 0 | 5 | 0 |
| 14 | DF | (Mexico) Édgar Dueñas | 43 | 0 | 21 | 0 | 18 | 1 | 4 | 0 |
| 15 | MF | (Mexico) Josué Castillejos | 28 | 0 | 7 | 0 | 16 | 0 | 5 | 0 |
| 16 | MF | (Mexico) Sergio Amaury Ponce | 24 | 0 | 5 | 0 | 15 | 1 | 4 | 0 |
| 17 | DF | (Mexico) Hassan Viades | 5 | 0 | 0 | 0 | 4 | 0 | 1 | 0 |
| 19 | FW | (Mexico) Uzziel Lozano | 19 | 1 | 10 | 1 | 7 | 0 | 2 | 0 |
| 21 | MF | (Mexico) Diego de la Torre | 5 | 0 | 0 | 0 | 2 | 0 | 3 | 0 |
| 22 | DF | (Mexico) Juan Carlos Núñez | 1 | 0 | 1 | 0 | 0 | 0 | 0 | 0 |
| 23 | FW | (Mexico) José Manuel Abundis | 30 | 7 | 17 | 6 | 9 | 1 | 4 | 0 |
| 24 | DF | (Mexico) José Manuel Cruzalta | 29 | 1 | 11 | 0 | 12 | 0 | 6 | 1 |
| 25 | DF | (Mexico) Edgar García | 2 | 0 | 0 | 0 | 0 | 0 | 2 | 0 |
| 29 | MF | (Mexico) Carlos Esquivel | 43 | 11 | 17 | 4 | 21 | 4 | 5 | 3 |
| 36 | MF | (Mexico) Jorge Oropeza | 2 | 0 | – | – | 2 | 0 | 0 | 0 |
| 37 | FW | (Mexico) Iván Castillejos | 11 | 2 | – | – | 9 | 2 | 2 | 0 |
| 43 | FW | (Mexico) Ismael Valadez | 20 | 3 | 3 | 1 | 13 | 2 | 4 | 0 |
| 51 | DF | (Mexico) Francisco Gamboa | 23 | 0 | 13 | 0 | 9 | 0 | 1 | 0 |
| 86 | MF | (Mexico) Salvador Reyes | 2 | 0 | – | – | 2 | 0 | 0 | 0 |
| ? | MF | (Mexico) Rigoberto Esparza | 1 | 0 | 0 | 0 | 0 | 0 | 1 | 0 |
Players that left the club during the season
| 2 | DF | (Mexico) Mario Méndez | 14 | 0 | 14 | 0 | – | – | – | – |
| 9 | FW | (Uruguay) Pablo Granoche | 13 | 2 | 13 | 2 | – | – | – | – |
| 30 | DF | (Mexico) Adalberto Palma | 1 | 0 | 1 | 0 | – | – | – | – |

=== Goalscorers ===
| Rank | Pos. | Player | Apertura | Clausura | Champions' Cup | Total |
|---|---|---|---|---|---|---|
| 1 | FW | (Uruguay) Vicente Sánchez | 6 | 4 | 1 | 11 |
| 1 | MF | (Mexico) Carlos Esquivel | 4 | 4 | 3 | 11 |
| 3 | MF | (Mexico) Israel López | 4 | 6 | 0 | 10 |
| 4 | MF | (Argentina) Rodrigo Díaz | 5 | 2 | 1 | 8 |
| 5 | FW | (Mexico) José Manuel Abundis | 6 | 1 | 0 | 7 |
| 6 | FW | (Mexico) Ismael Valadez | 1 | 2 | 1 | 4 |
| 7 | DF | (Paraguay) Paulo da Silva | 1 | 1 | 1 | 3 |
| 7 | DF | (Mexico) Manuel de la Torre | 2 | 1 | 0 | 3 |
| 7 | MF | (Mexico) Sinha | 2 | 1 | 0 | 3 |
| 10 | FW | (Mexico) Iván Castillejos | 0 | 2 | 0 | 2 |
| 10 | FW | (Uruguay) Pablo Granoche | 2 | 0 | 0 | 2 |
| 12 | DF | (Mexico) José Manuel Cruzalta | 0 | 0 | 1 | 1 |
| 12 | DF | (Mexico) Édgar Dueñas | 0 | 1 | 0 | 1 |
| 12 | FW | (Mexico) Uzziel Lozano | 1 | 0 | 0 | 1 |
| 12 | DF | (Mexico) Mario Méndez | 1 | 0 | 0 | 1 |
| 12 | MF | (Mexico) Sergio Amaury Ponce | 0 | 1 | 0 | 1 |
| 12 | MF | (Argentina) Ariel Rosada | 0 | 0 | 1 | 1 |
| Own goals | | | 1 | 1 | 0 | 2 |
| Total | | | 36 | 27 | 9 | 72 |

=== Own goals ===
| Player | Against | Result | Date | Competition |
|---|---|---|---|---|
| (Paraguay) Paulo da Silva | Monterrey | 3–3 (H) | 15 December 2005 | Primera División |
