= List of Tigres UANL records and statistics =

Tigres UANL is a Mexican professional association football team based in San Nicolás, Nuevo León, that competes in Liga MX. This is a list of records for the team, which dates from their inaugural season in 1960 to present.

This list covers Tigres's major accolades, the records set by the club, its managers, and its players. The player records section includes details of the club's top scorers and those with the most appearances in first-team competitions. It also records the notable achievements of Tigres players at international level.

Tigres has won eight league titles, three domestic cups, and one CONCACAF Champions League. The club was the first in its country and in CONCACAF to compete in a FIFA Club World Cup final.

== Honours ==
The club has won a total of 16 titles.

Continental
Competitions	Titles	Seasons	Runner-up
CONCACAF Champions League	1	2020	2015–16; 2016–17; 2019
Copa Libertadores	0	—	2015
FIFA Club World Cup	0	—	2020
National
Competitions	Titles	Seasons	Runner-up
Liga MX	8	1977–78; 1981–82; Apertura 2011; Apertura 2015; Apertura 2016; Apertura 2017; Clausura 2019; Clausura 2023	1979–80; Invierno 2001; Apertura 2003; Apertura 2014; Clausura 2017; Apertura 2023
Copa MX	3	1975–76; 1995–96; Clausura 2014	1989–90
Supercopa MX	0	—	2014
Supercopa de la Liga MX	0	—	2024
Campeón de Campeones	4	2016; 2017; 2018; 2023	1976; 2019

== Club records ==
=== Wins ===
- 8–1 vs. Puebla (Copa MX)

=== Losses ===
- 0–7 vs. Atlante (1979–80 season)
- 0–7 vs. Deportivo Toluca (Liga MX)

== Individual records ==
=== Top scorers ===
Place	Name	Period	Liga MX	Copa MX	Continental (Note: Includes CONCACAF Champions Cup, and Copa Libertadores.)	World	Other (Note: Includes Leagues Cup, Supercopa MX, Supercopa de la Liga, Campeón de Campeones, and Interliga.)	Total
1	(France) André-Pierre Gignac	2015–	187	2	21	3	3	216
2	(Mexico) Tomás Boy	1975–1988	98	2	4	0	0	104
3	(Argentina) Walter Gaitán	2002–2007	71	0	4	0	5	80
4	(Argentina) Lucas Lobos	2008–2014	64	2	0	0	2	68
5	(Peru) Gerónimo Barbadillo	1975–1982	59	2	0	0	0	61
6	(Argentina) Andrés Silvera	2003–2006	47	0	4	0	0	51
7	(Mexico) Alfredo Jiménez	1975–1981	40	9	0	0	0	49
8	(Mexico) Juan Manuel Azuara	1978–1982	45	0	1	0	0	46
9	(Chile) Claudio Núñez	1996–2001	40	2	3	0	0	45
10	(Argentina) Roberto Gasparini	1989–1994	39	4	0	0	0	43

=== Most appearances ===
Place	Name	Period	Apps
1	(Argentina) Nahuel Guzmán	2014–	490
2	(Mexico) Hugo Ayala	2010–2022	462
3	(Mexico) Jesús Dueñas	2009–2022	450
4	(Argentina) Guido Pizarro	2013–2017, 2018–2024	448
5	(Mexico) Tomás Boy	1975–1988	431
6	(Mexico) Jorge Torres Nilo	2010–2020	383
7	(France) André-Pierre Gignac	2015–	381
8	(Mexico) Javier Aquino	2015–	371

== International competition statistics ==
Competition	Played	Won	Draw	Loss	GF	GA	GD	Win%
CONCACAF Champions Cup/League	74	37	22	15	120	61	+59	50.00
Copa Libertadores	34	15	12	7	57	41	+16	44.12
FIFA Club World Cup	3	2	0	1	3	2	+1	66.67
Leagues Cup	8	5	1	2	10	7	+3	62.50
Total	119	59	35	25	190	111	+79	49.58

== Awards ==
=== Players ===
- Balón de Oro Liga MX
  - (Peru) Gerónimo Barbadillo (1981–82)
  - (Argentina) Walter Gaitán (2006-C)
  - (Argentina) Lucas Lobos (2011-C, 2011-A)
  - (France) André-Pierre Gignac (2015–16)
- Copa Libertadores Best Player
  - (Ecuador) Joffre Guerrón (2015)
- CONCACAF Champions Cup Golden Ball
  - (France) André-Pierre Gignac (2020)

=== Managements ===
- Best Management Liga MX
  - (Brazil) Ricardo Ferretti (2011-C, 2011-A)
