= Primera División de México Apertura 2004 =

Primera División de México
- Season: 2004−05
- Champions: UNAM (5th title)
- Champions' Cup: Monterrey
- Copa Libertadores: UANL; Pachuca; Guadalajara (First Stage)
- Copa Sudamericana: UNAM
- Top goalscorer: Guillermo Franco (15 goals)

Primera División de México (Mexican First Division) Apertura 2004 is a Mexican football tournament - one of two short tournaments that take up the entire year to determine the champion(s) of Mexican football. It began on Saturday, August 14, 2004, and ran until November 20, when the regular season ended. Dorados de Sinaloa was promoted to the México Primera División thus, San Luis, Irapuato and Querétaro were all relegated to the Primera División A, making it 18 teams in the Primera División as opposed to 20. On December 11, UNAM defeated Monterrey and became champions for the fifth time.

== Clubs ==
Location of the Primera División Apertura 2004 teams

Team	City	Stadium
América	Mexico City	Azteca
Atlante	Mexico City	Azteca
Atlas	Guadalajara, Jalisco	Jalisco
Chiapas	Tuxtla Gutiérrez, Chiapas	Víctor Manuel Reyna
Cruz Azul	Mexico City	Azul
Guadalajara	Guadalajara, Jalisco	Jalisco
Morelia	Morelia, Michoacán	Morelos
Monterrey	Monterrey, Nuevo León	Tecnológico
Necaxa	Aguascalientes, Aguascalientes	Victoria
Pachuca	Pachuca, Hidalgo	Hidalgo
Puebla	Puebla, Puebla	Cuauhtémoc
Santos Laguna	Torreón, Coahuila	Corona
Sinaloa	Culiacán, Sinaloa	Carlos González y González
Toluca	Toluca, State of Mexico	Nemesio Díez
UAG	Zapopan, Jalisco	Tres de Marzo
UANL	San Nicolás de los Garza, Nuevo León	Universitario
UNAM	Mexico City	Olímpico Universitario
Veracruz	Veracruz, Veracruz	Luis "Pirata" Fuente

== Regular phase ==
Group 1
Pos	Team	Pld	W	D	L	GF	GA	GD	Pts	Qualification
1	Atlante	17	7	3	7	27	33	−6	24	Automatically qualified for the Liguilla (Playoffs)
2	UNAM	17	7	2	8	25	31	−6	23	Automatically qualified for the Liguilla (Playoffs)
3	Morelia	17	6	4	7	29	30	−1	22	
4	América	17	5	5	7	17	23	−6	20	
5	Sinaloa	17	4	4	9	25	32	−7	16	
6	UAG	17	4	4	9	17	29	−12	16	

Source: MedioTiempo

Group 2
Pos	Team	Pld	W	D	L	GF	GA	GD	Pts	Qualification
1	Toluca	17	10	2	5	27	15	+12	32	Automatically qualified for the Liguilla (Playoffs)
2	Atlas	17	9	4	4	34	24	+10	31	Automatically qualified for the Liguilla (Playoffs)
3	Guadalajara	17	8	5	4	34	22	+12	29	Qualified for Liguilla (Playoffs) on a points basis
4	UANL	17	6	5	6	37	27	+10	23	
5	Puebla	17	5	6	6	17	23	−6	21	
6	Cruz Azul	17	4	4	9	30	37	−7	16	

Source: MedioTiempo

Group 3
Pos	Team	Pld	W	D	L	GF	GA	GD	Pts	Qualification
1	Veracruz	17	11	2	4	27	25	+2	35	Automatically qualified for the Liguilla (Playoffs)
2	Pachuca	17	9	5	3	30	19	+11	32	Automatically qualified for the Liguilla (Playoffs)
3	Monterrey	17	8	3	6	36	34	+2	27	Qualified for Liguilla (Playoffs) on a points basis
4	Necaxa	17	6	3	8	27	26	+1	21	
5	Santos Laguna	17	5	3	9	22	22	0	18	
6	Chiapas	17	4	6	7	20	29	−9	18	

Source: MedioTiempo

== League table ==
Pos	Team	Pld	W	D	L	GF	GA	GD	Pts	Qualification
1	Veracruz	17	11	2	4	27	25	+2	35	Automatically qualified for the Liguilla (Playoffs)
2	Toluca	17	10	2	5	27	15	+12	32	Automatically qualified for the Liguilla (Playoffs)
3	Pachuca	17	9	5	3	30	19	+11	32	Automatically qualified for the Liguilla (Playoffs)
4	Atlas	17	9	4	4	34	24	+10	31	Automatically qualified for the Liguilla (Playoffs)
5	Guadalajara	17	8	5	4	34	22	+12	29	Qualified for Liguilla (Playoffs) on a points basis
6	Monterrey	17	8	3	6	36	34	+2	27	Qualified for Liguilla (Playoffs) on a points basis
7	Atlante	17	7	3	7	27	33	−6	24	Automatically qualified for the Liguilla (Playoffs)
8	UANL	17	6	5	6	37	27	+10	23	
9	UNAM	17	7	2	8	25	31	−6	23	Automatically qualified for the Liguilla (Playoffs)
10	Morelia	17	6	4	7	29	30	−1	22	
11	Necaxa	17	6	3	8	27	26	+1	21	
12	Puebla	17	5	6	6	17	23	−6	21	
13	América	17	5	5	7	17	23	−6	20	
14	Santos Laguna	17	5	3	9	22	22	0	18	
15	Chiapas	17	4	6	7	20	29	−9	18	
16	Cruz Azul	17	4	4	9	30	37	−7	16	
17	Sinaloa	17	4	4	9	25	32	−7	16	
18	UAG	17	4	4	9	17	29	−12	16	

Source: MedioTiempo

== Results ==
Home \ Away	AME	ATE	ATS	CHI	CAZ	GDL	MTY	MOR	NEC	PAC	PUE	SAN	SIN	TOL	UAG	UNL	UNM	VER
América	—	–	–	–	2–1	–	1–0	2–3	–	1–1	0–1	–	3–2	–	–	–	0–3	1–1
Atlante	1–0	—	3–2	–	–	–	7–1	1–6	–	–	2–1	–	–	2–1	4–0	1–2	0–1	–
Atlas	1–1	–	—	–	3–3	–	3–3	3–3	–	1–2	0–1	–	–	–	–	–	3–1	2–0
Chiapas	2–1	0–0	1–2	—	–	0–0	–	–	2–2	–	1–1	–	–	1–3	–	1–1	–	–
Cruz Azul	–	2–0	–	3–4	—	2–4	–	–	0–1	–	–	1–0	3–3	1–3	5–2	1–1	–	–
Guadalajara	1–1	7–0	1–3	–	–	—	1–0	2–1	–	–	3–1	–	–	1–1	2–2	3–1	–	–
Monterrey	–	–	–	5–1	3–0	–	—	2–1	–	4–1	–	1–0	6–2	–	–	–	1–1	2–0
Morelia	–	–	–	2–1	1–1	–	–	—	1–5	0–2	–	1–1	3–2	–	2–0	–	0–0	1–2
Necaxa	4–1	1–1	0–2	–	–	1–2	2–3	–	—	–	1–2	–	–	0–1	–	2–1	–	–
Pachuca	–	1–1	–	3–0	3–1	1–1	–	–	4–1	—	–	2–1	1–0	–	2–0	–	–	1–2
Puebla	–	–	–	–	3–1	–	1–1	0–3	–	1–1	—	1–0	1–1	–	–	–	2–3	0–0
Santos Laguna	1–1	2–1	2–0	4–2	–	4–1	–	–	1–1	–	–	—	–	0–1	–	2–1	–	–
Sinaloa	–	0–1	0–1	0–0	–	2–0	–	–	3–2	–	–	2–1	—	0–1	–	3–3	–	–
Toluca	0–1	–	0–2	–	–	–	4–0	3–1	–	3–2	1–0	–	–	—	1–1	4–1	0–1	–
UAG	1–0	–	2–3	0–1	–	–	3–2	–	0–1	–	1–1	1–0	1–2	–	—	–	–	–
UANL	0–1	–	1–3	–	–	–	6–2	3–0	–	0–0	4–0	–	–	–	2–2	—	3–1	7–1
UNAM	–	–	–	2–1	1–3	1–5	–	–	1–3	2–3	–	2–1	3–2	–	0–1	–	—	2–3
Veracruz	–	6–2	–	0–2	3–2	1–0	–	–	1–0	–	–	3–2	2–1	1–0	1–0	–	–	—

Updated to match(es) played on 21 November 2004. Source: RSSSF
Legend: Blue = home team win; Yellow = draw; Red = away team win.

== Top goalscorers ==
Players sorted first by goals scored, then by last name. Only regular season goals listed.

Rank	Player	Club	Goals
1	(Argentina) Guillermo Franco	Monterrey	15
2	(Paraguay) José Cardozo	Toluca	12
2	(Brazil) Robert de Pinho	Atlas	12
4	(Mexico) Rafael Márquez Lugo	Morelia	11
4	(Argentina) Vicente Matías Vuoso	Santos Laguna	11
6	(Argentina) Luciano Figueroa	Cruz Azul	10
6	(Chile) Sebastián González	Atlante	10
8	(Argentina) Walter Gaitán	UANL	9
9	(Mexico) Jared Borgetti	Sinaloa	8
9	(Paraguay) Salvador Cabañas	Chiapas	8

Source: MedioTiempo

== Final phase (Liguilla) ==
=== Bracket ===
Quarterfinals
3	Pachuca	1	1	2
6	Monterrey	2	1	3
2	Toluca	2	3	5
7	Atlante	4	4	8
4	Atlas	1	3	4
5	Guadalajara	0	3	3
1	Veracruz	0	1	1
9	UNAM	3	1	4

Semifinals
6	Monterrey	4	3	7
7	Atlante	2	1	3
4	Atlas	3	1	4
9	UNAM	4	2	6

Finals
6	Monterrey	1	0	1
9	UNAM	2	1	3

=== Quarterfinals ===
November 25, 2004
19:00

Monterrey	2–1	Pachuca
Erviti 7'; Franco 59'	Report	Chitiva 57'

Estadio Tecnológico, Monterrey
Referee: Jorge Eduardo Gasso (Mexico City)
November 28, 2004
12:00

Pachuca	1–1	Monterrey
Valdez 60'	Report	Franco 49'

Estadio Hidalgo, Pachuca
Referee: Manuel Ernesto Glower (Mexico City)

Monterrey won 3–2 on aggregate.

November 24, 2004
19:00

Atlante	4–2	Toluca
Rey 33', 90'; González 39', 79'	Report	Cardozo 20'; Sánchez 37'

Estadio Azteca, Mexico City
Referee: Hugo León Guajardo (Mexico City)
November 27, 2004
15:00

Toluca	3–4	Atlante
de la Torre 38'; Dueñas 44'; Cardozo 59'	Report	Rey 10', 66' (pen.), 83'; Garay 45'

Estadio Nemesio Díez, Toluca
Referee: Mauricio Morales (Mexico City)

Atlante won 8–5 on aggregate.

November 25, 2004
20:45

Guadalajara	0–1	Atlas
	Report	J. M. García 17'

Estadio Jalisco, Guadalajara
Referee: Marco Antonio Rodríguez (Mexico City)
November 28, 2004
19:00

Atlas	3–3	Guadalajara
Robert 5', 23'; J. P. García 20'	Report	Medina 66'; Sabah 75', 90+3'

Estadio Jalisco, Guadalajara
Referee: Armando Archundia (Estado de México)

Atlas won 4–3 on aggregate.

November 24, 2004
21:00

UNAM	3–0	Veracruz
Botero 15', 81'; Lozano 73' (pen.)	Report

Estadio Olímpico Universitario, Mexico City
Referee: Germán Arredondo Ramírez (Guanajuato)
November 27, 2004
19:00

Veracruz	1–1	UNAM
Biscayzacú 87'	Report	Alonso 88'

Estadio Luis "Pirata" Fuente, Veracruz
Referee: Gilberto Alcalá Pineda (Mexico City)

UNAM won 4–1 on aggregate.

=== Semifinals ===
December 1, 2004
15:00

Atlante	2–4	Monterrey
Lash 60'; Lucas 90+1'	Report	Arellano 56'; Pérez 80', 90'; Franco 88'

Estadio Azteca, Mexico City
Referee: Armando Archundia (Estado de México)
December 4, 2004
20:00

Monterrey	3–1	Atlante
Franco 23', 60'; Pérez Núñez 69'	Report	Lash 86'

Estadio Tecnológico, Monterrey
Referee: Manuel Ernesto Glower (Mexico City)

Monterrey won 7–3 on aggregate.

December 2, 2004
20:30

UNAM	4–3	Atlas
Fonseca 10'; Botero 12', 47'; Alonso 83'	Report	J. P. García 33'; Osorno 54'; Robert 62' (pen.)

Estadio Olímpico Universitario, Mexico City
Referee: Gilberto Alcalá Pineda (Mexico City)
December 5, 2004
19:00

Atlas	1–2	UNAM
Robert 86'	Report	Fonseca 43'; López 47'

Estadio Jalisco, Guadalajara
Referee: Mauricio Morales (Mexico City)

UNAM won 6–4 on aggregate.

=== Finals ===
December 8, 2004
20:30

UNAM	2–1	Monterrey
Beltrán 49'; Toledo 80'	Report	Franco 20'

Estadio Olímpico Universitario, Mexico City
Referee: Mauricio Morales (Mexico City)
December 11, 2004
19:00

Monterrey	0–1	UNAM
	Report	Fonseca 46'

Estadio Tecnológico, Monterrey
Referee: Armando Archundia (Estado de México)

UNAM won 3–1 on aggregate.

Champions

5th title
