= Hugo Sánchez (footballer, born 1981) =

Mexican footballer (born 1981)

Personal information
- Full name: Hugo Sánchez Guerrero
- Date of birth: 8 May 1981 (age 45)
- Place of birth: Monterrey, Mexico
- Height: 1.85 m (6 ft 1 in)
- Position: Defender

Team information
- Current team: Orgullo Reynosa (assistant)

Youth career
- Tigres UANL

Senior career*
Years	Team	Apps	(Gls)
2000–2006	Tigres UANL	141	(8)
2007–2008	Morelia	23	(2)
2008–2009	Tigres UANL	48	(2)
2009–2014	Chiapas	28	(2)
2011–2014	→ UAT (loan)	93	(4)
2014–2017	UAT	83	(1)

International career
2004	Mexico U23	2	(0)
2003–2005	Mexico	12	(0)

Managerial career
- 2023–: Orgullo Reynosa (assistant)
- * Club domestic league appearances and goals

Hugo Sánchez Guerrero (born 8 May 1981) is a Mexican football coach and a former player. He is an assistant coach with Orgullo Reynosa.

Sánchez made his First Division debut with Tigres in the Apertura 2001. The club ended his first season as runners-up in the League.

Sánchez played for Mexico at the 2004 Summer Olympics. He also played for his country on the 2006 World Cup Qualifyiers, including the historical game against Costa Rica, where Mexico won the away game in that nation for the first time in 40 years.

On 23 February 2005, he became the first person born in Monterrey to score in a Copa Libertadores.

== Honours ==
UANL

- InterLiga: 2005, 2006
