= Sixto Peralta =

Argentine footballer (born 1979)

Personal information
- Full name: Sixto Raimundo Peralta Salso
- Date of birth: 16 April 1979 (age 47)
- Place of birth: Comodoro Rivadavia, Argentina
- Height: 1.78 m (5 ft 10 in)
- Position: Attacking midfielder

Youth career
- 1994–1996: CAI

Senior career*
Years	Team	Apps	(Gls)
1994–1996	CAI		
1996–1999	Huracán	81	(12)
1999–2000	Racing Club	31	(6)
2000–2002	Inter Milan	0	(0)
2000–2001	→ Torino (loan)	4	(1)
2001–2002	→ Ipswich Town (loan)	22	(3)
2002–2003	Racing Club	31	(2)
2003–2004	Santos Laguna	31	(1)
2004–2006	Tigres UANL	64	(8)
2006–2007	Racing Club	25	(0)
2007–2008	River Plate	6	(1)
2008–2012	CFR Cluj	109	(7)
2012–2013	Universidad Católica	28	(4)
2013–2015	Universidad de Concepción	41	(5)
Total		473	(50)

International career
1995	Argentina U17	12	(2)
1997–1999	Argentina U20	18	(1)
- * Club domestic league appearances and goals as of 29 June 2014

Sixto Raimundo Peralta Salso (born 16 April 1979) is an Argentine retired footballer who played as a midfielder.

== Club career ==
=== CAI, Huracán and Racing Club ===
Peralta, nicknamed "Mumo", was born on 16 April 1979 in Comodoro Rivadavia, Argentina and began playing junior-level football at local club CAI. In 1994, he started playing for the team's seniors.

Subsequently, Peralta joined Huracán, making his Argentine Primera División debut on 23 August 1996, as coach Nelson Chabay sent him to replace Darío Fabbro in a 0–0 draw against Lanús. He scored his first goal in the competition on 6 April 1997 in a 3–1 home win over Vélez Sarsfield. Peralta started the 1998–99 strongly by scoring three goals in the first four rounds in victories over Lanús and Unión de Santa Fe, and in a draw against Gimnasia de Jujuy. Until the end of the season, he netted a personal record of nine goals, including a brace in a 3–2 victory against Newell's Old Boys.

In 1999, Peralta was transferred from Huracán to Racing Club for €600,000. He scored his first goal for them on 5 November in a 1–1 draw against Boca Juniors.

=== Inter Milan and loans ===
In the summer of 2000, Inter Milan paid €4.5 million for Peralta's transfer. His debut for I Nerazzurri occurred on 8 September 2000 in the Supercoppa Italiana, as coach Marcello Lippi sent him in the 60th minute to replace Vladimir Jugović in a 4–3 loss to Lazio. His second appearance took place 10 days later in a 1–1 draw against Lecce in the Coppa Italia. Peralta's third and last match for Inter took place on 28 September in a 4–1 win over Ruch Chorzów in the first round of the UEFA Cup. He did not make any further appearances, as coach Lippi was replaced with Marco Tardelli. However, during this period he developed a close friendship with Javier Zanetti.

Peralta was loaned for the second half of the season for €300,000 to Serie B club, Torino. There, he made four league appearances and scored once in a 2–1 victory against Cosenza, as his side finished in first place and gained promotion to Serie A.

For the 2001–02 season, Peralta was loaned for €200,000 to Ipswich Town. He made his Premier League debut on 24 October 2001, playing the entire match under coach George Burley in a 3–3 draw against Southampton. Throughout the season, he made 22 league appearances and netted three goals in three wins against Leicester City, Derby County and Everton. However, the team was relegated at the end of the season. He also represented Ipswich in four games during the 2001–02 UEFA Cup campaign, as they eliminated Helsingborgs in the second round, but got defeated by the team he belonged to, Inter Milan, in the third round.

=== Return to Racing Club ===
In 2002, Peralta was transferred by Inter back to Racing Club for €2 million where he was coached by Osvaldo Ardiles. There, Peralta played four games in the 2002 Copa Sudamericana, as they got past River Plate in the round of 16, but were eliminated by San Lorenzo in the quarter-finals against whom he scored a goal. Subsequently, he made seven appearances in the 2003 Copa Libertadores, scoring once in a 4–1 group stage victory against Nacional, with the campaign concluding in a defeat to América de Cali in the round of 16.

=== Santos Laguna and Tigres UANL ===
In 2003, Peralta joined Santos Laguna. He made his Primera División de México debut on 10 August, as coach Luis Fernando Tena sent him in the 65th minute to replace Joaquín Reyes in a 1–1 draw against Necaxa. On 14 September he netted his first goal in a 3–3 draw against Tecos. He helped them win the 2004 InterLiga after defeating Atlas at the penalty shoot-out in the final. Then he made seven appearances in the 2004 Copa Libertadores, as his side reached the round of 16 where they were defeated by River Plate.

Peralta went to play for Tigres UANL in 2004. He helped them win the 2005 InterLiga after defeating 2–0 Deportivo Toluca in the final. Subsequently, he played seven matches in the 2005 Copa Libertadores, scoring two group stage goals in a draw and a win over Banfield, as they reached the quarter-finals and were defeated by São Paulo. On 13 March 2005, he netted a brace in a 6–0 domestic victory against Deportivo Toluca. He helped the club win another InterLiga in 2006, defeating Monterrey with 2–1 after extra time in the final. Then in the 2006 Copa Libertadores, Peralta made seven appearances and scored once in a 2–0 group stage success over Corinthians, as the campaign ended following a 5–3 aggregate loss to Libertad in the round of 16. Peralta's last Primera División de México appearance on 1 May 2006 in a 2–0 loss to Atlante in which he received a red card, totaling 95 matches with seven goals in the competition.

=== Racing Club and River Plate ===
In 2006, Peralta made a third comeback to Racing Club. One year later he joined River Plate. There, he played in a 1–0 loss to Botafogo in the 2007 Copa Sudamericana. He made only six league appearances for River with one goal scored in a 2–0 win over his former team, Huracán. Peralta's last Argentine Primera División match took place on 1 December 2007 in a 4–0 away loss to Olimpo, having a total of 174 games with 21 goals in the competition.

=== CFR Cluj ===
Peralta was transferred in January 2008 from River Plate to CFR Cluj for a fee of €800,000. He made his Liga I debut on 23 February 2008 when coach Ioan Andone sent him in the 84th minute to replace António Semedo in a 4–1 win over Universitatea Craiova. Peralta ended his first season with CFR by winning The Double, which constituted the club's first trophies, making eight league appearances. He also played as a starter in the Cupa României final, but was substituted by Gabriel Mureșan in the 81st minute of the 2–1 victory against Unirea Urziceni.

He then made five appearances in the 2008–09 Champions League group stage with The Railway Men, where in the first one the team earned a historical 2–1 victory at Stadio Olimpico against AS Roma. At the end of the season, Peralta helped the team win the Cupa României, as under coach Toni Conceição he scored a penalty goal and was replaced in the 57th minute with Álvaro Pereira in the 3–0 win over Politehnica Timișoara in the final.

Peralta started the 2009–10 season by winning the Supercupa României, a penalty shoot-out victory over Unirea Urziceni, where coach Conceição replaced him after 68 minutes with Eugen Trică. Subsequently, he scored his first goal in the first round of the season in another win against Urziceni. In that season, Peralta won another Double with CFR, playing 26 games in which he netted three goals under coaches Conceição and Andrea Mandorlini. He also played for the first 84 minutes, being substituted afterwards by Davide Bottone, in the penalty shoot-out victory against FC Vaslui in the Cupa României final. Peralta helped his side get past FK Sarajevo in the 2009–10 Europa League play-off, reaching the group stage, where he played four games. His last trophy won with The White and Burgundies was the 2011–12 title, as coaches Jorge Costa and Andone used him in 23 matches. Peralta's last Liga I appearance took place on 11 May 2012 in CFR's 2–1 home win over Voința Sibiu, totaling 109 matches with seven goals in the competition.

=== Universidad Católica and Universidad de Concepción ===
Peralta joined Universidad Católica in 2012. He made his Chilean Primera División debut on 9 July 2012, as coach Martín Lasarte sent him in the 56th minute to replace Matías Mier in a 1–0 loss to Palestino. About one week later, he netted his first goal in a 3–2 victory against Santiago Wanderers. He also took part in the 2012 Copa Sudamericana campaign, as Universidad reached the semi-finals where they were eliminated after 1–1 on aggregate by São Paulo.

In 2013, Peralta went to play for Universidad de Concepción. On 25 August, he scored his first league goal for the club in a 3–2 away win over Everton. On 23 November 2014, Peralta made his last Chilean Primera División appearance in a 4–1 away loss to Audax Italiano, totaling 69 matches with nine goals in the competition.

== International career ==
Peralta was part of Argentina's under-17 national team that was runner-up in the 1995 South American U-17 Championship. Subsequently, he made six appearances for them under coach José Pékerman during the 1995 U-17 World Championship, forming a trio in the midfield alongside Esteban Cambiasso and Pablo Aimar. He scored one goal in 2–0 group stage win over Guinea, as the team reached the semi-finals where they were defeated 3–0 by Brazil. They finished the tournament in third place, following a 2–0 win over Oman.

Peralta played seven matches for Argentina's under-20 team, scoring once in a 3–0 win over Chile, as they won the 1997 South American Youth Championship. Afterwards, he made another seven appearances, helping the team win the 1999 edition of the same competition, which Argentina hosted. Then Peralta played four games in the 1999 World Youth Championship where they were defeated 4–1 by Mexico in the round of 16.

== Basketball career ==
Peralta practiced basketball as a child for CAI, before switching to football. After he ended his football career, Peralta came back to play basketball for CAI, making his official debut in a 78–76 win against Petrochimico. It was a game in a regional league in Argentina, arranged by the Comodoro Rivadavia Basketball Association.

== Honours ==
Torino

- Serie B: 2000–01

Santos Laguna

- InterLiga: 2004

Tigres UANL

- InterLiga: 2005, 2006

CFR Cluj

- Liga I: 2007–08, 2009–10, 2011–12
- Cupa României: 2007–08, 2008–09, 2009–10
- Supercupa României: 2009

Argentina U17

- South American U-17 Championship runner-up: 1995

Argentina U20

- South American Youth Championship: 1997, 1999
