= InterLiga =

- Founded: 2004; 22 years ago
- Abolished: 2010; 16 years ago
- Region: Mexico
- Teams: 8
- Broadcaster: Fox Sports en Español
- Motto: Rumbo a la Libertadores

InterLiga was a qualifying association football competition for the Copa Libertadores for Mexican clubs, it was held from 2004 to 2010. The InterLiga replaced the Pre-Libertadores tournament as Mexico's qualification method.

== History ==
From 1998 to 2003, the Mexican clubs competed in the Pre-Libertadores tournament as the qualification method, which consisted in two rounds. The first round known as Selectivo Pre Pre-Libertadores between Mexican clubs interested in participating, two clubs advanced to the next round known as Copa Pre-Libertadores, facing two clubs from Venezuela, the four clubs faced each other to determine two spots for the Copa Libertadores.

In 2004, Mexico and Venezuela were granted automatic entries to the Copa Libertadores for the first time. The FMF decided to create a national qualifying tournament for two spots, the first InterLiga was held that January in the United States, during the off-season of the Primera División.

== Competition format ==
The eight qualifying clubs were selected based on the accumulated points in the Apertura and Clausura tournaments of the Primera División, and divided into two groups of four, with even-numbered seeds in one group and odd-numbered seeds in the other. In order to assure a more neutral environment, and to take advantage of a large and relatively well-off pool of Mexican football fans, all matches were held in the United States in California and Texas, two states with large Mexican populations.

=== 2004 ===
- Mexico-1: The winners of the final 1 played between the winners of each group.
- Mexico-2: The winners of the reclassification match between the loser of final 1 and the winners of final 2 (played between the second place of each group).

The two clubs qualified directly to the group stage of the 2004 Copa Libertadores.

=== 2005-2010 ===
- Mexico-1: The winners of the Serie Mexico-1 played from 2005 to 2007, in round-trip matches between the champions of Clausura and Apertura tournaments from two previous years. From 2008 to 2010, the club with the most points in the regular season of the Apertura tournament qualified as Mexico-1 (only clubs not participating in the CONCACAF Champions League).
- Mexico-2 and Mexico-3: The group winners with the most points faced the second place from the other group in final 1, the group winners with the fewest points faced the second place of the other group in final 2. If the winners of final 1 was the club with the most points, then it qualified as Mexico-2, and the winners of final 2 qualified as Mexico-3. If the winners of final 1 was the club with the fewest points, then it qualified as Mexico-3 and the winners of final 2 qualified as Mexico-2.

Mexico-1 and Mexico-2 qualified directly to the group stage of the Copa Libertadores, Mexico-3 qualified for the first round.

The current league champions were excluded from the InterLiga as they qualify for the CONCACAF Champions League, which is contested during the same time period as the Libertadores, and whose prize is a spot in the FIFA Club World Cup. Mexican teams would not be eligible for the latter competition if they won the Libertadores because Mexico belongs to CONCACAF.

== Results ==
| Ed. | Year | Qualified Mexico-1 | Qualified Mexico-2 | Qualified Mexico-3 |
|---|---|---|---|---|
| 1 | 2004 | Santos Laguna^{1} | América^{1} | — |
| 2 | 2005 | Pachuca | Tigres UANL | Guadalajara |
| 3 | 2006 | Pumas UNAM | Tigres UANL | Guadalajara |
| 4 | 2007 | Toluca | Necaxa | América |
| 5 | 2008 | Guadalajara | América | Atlas |
| 6 | 2009 | San Luis | Guadalajara | Pachuca |
| 7 | 2010 | Morelia | Monterrey | Estudiantes Tecos |

Notes

1. Mexico has two spots in the 2004 Copa Libertadores, Santos Laguna qualified as Mexico-1 and América qualified as Mexico-2.

== Appearances by club ==
| Club | Apps | Years |
|---|---|---|
| América | 6 | **2004**, 2005, **2007**, **2008**, 2009, 2010 |
| Tigres UANL | 6 | 2004, **2005**, **2006**, 2007, 2009, 2010 |
| Morelia | 5 | 2004, 2006, 2007, 2008, 2009 |
| Guadalajara | 4 | 2004, **2005**, **2006**, **2009** |
| Monterrey | 4 | 2006, 2007, 2008,**2010** |
| Atlante | 3 | 2004, 2005, 2010 |
| Atlas | 3 | 2004, **2008**, 2009 |
| Chiapas | 3 | 2005, 2007, 2010 |
| Cruz Azul | 3 | 2006, 2007, 2008 |
| Tecos/Estudiantes Tecos | 3 | 2007, 2009, **2010** |
| Necaxa | 3 | 2005, 2006, **2007** |
| Santos Laguna | 3 | **2004**, 2005, 2010 |
| Toluca | 3 | 2004, 2005, 2009 |
| Pachuca | 2 | 2006, **2009** |
| Puebla | 1 | 2010 |
| Pumas UNAM | 1 | 2007 |
| Veracruz | 1 | 2006 |

Notes

Bold — Qualified for the Copa Libertadores.

== Top goalscorers ==
| Rank | Player | Goals |
|---|---|---|
| 1 | (Chile) Reinaldo Navia | 9 |
| 1 | (Paraguay) Salvador Cabañas | 9 |
| 3 | (Argentina) Bruno Marioni | 7 |
| 4 | (Mexico) Cuauhtémoc Blanco | 6 |
| 4 | (Mexico) Aldo de Nigris | 6 |
| 6 | (Mexico) Omar Bravo | 5 |
| 6 | (Argentina) Walter Gaitán | 5 |
| 6 | (Brazil) Kléber Boas | 5 |
| 6 | (Mexico) Alfredo Moreno | 5 |
| 10 | (Mexico) Manuel Perez | 4 |
| 10 | (Mexico) Jared Borgetti | 4 |
| 10 | (Chile) Sebastian Gonzalez | 4 |
| 10 | (Mexico) Carlos Ochoa | 4 |
| 10 | (Mexico) Ramón Morales | 4 |
| 10 | (Paraguay) Edgar Benitez | 4 |
| 10 | (Mexico) Adolfo Bautista | 4 |
| 10 | (Paraguay) Jorge Achucarro | 4 |
