= Claudio Núñez =

Chilean footballer (born 1975)

Personal information
- Full name: Claudio Patricio Núñez Caamaño
- Date of birth: 16 October 1975 (age 51)
- Place of birth: Valparaíso, Chile
- Height: 1.73 m (5 ft 8 in)
- Position: Forward

Youth career
- Humberto Nelson
- Santiago Wanderers

Senior career*
Years	Team	Apps	(Gls)
1993–1996	Santiago Wanderers	39	(11)
1996–2001	Tigres UANL	82	(35)
1998	→ Universidad Católica (loan)	5	(1)
2001	Al-Shoalah	13	(2)
2002	Tigres UANL	5	(0)
2002	→ Puebla (loan)	12	(2)
2003	Al-Shoalah	5	(13)
2003	Santiago Wanderers	8	(1)
2004–2005	Tigres UANL	7	(5)
2005	Unión Española	13	(2)
2006–2007	Tigres Los Mochis	16	(3)
2007–2008	Everton	2	(0)
Total		207	(73)

International career
1996–2003	Chile	31	(4)
- * Club domestic league appearances and goals

Claudio Patricio Núñez Caamaño (born 16 October 1975) is a Chilean former footballer who played as a striker. He is nicknamed "El Diablo", which means "the Devil".

He made his name playing for Tigres UANL, where he had his most success.

== Career ==
As a child, Núñez was with Humberto Nelson in his city of birth, then he joined Santiago Wanderers youth system. After playing during four seasons for the club, he moved to Monterrey, Mexico, to play with Tigres in 1996. Tigres had just been privatized after a crisis that ended with the team's relegation to Primera División A. In 1998, he played on loan at Universidad Católica.

His incredible number of goals in Tigres quickly made him a team hero. He was instrumental in returning Tigres to the First Division.

He played 10 seasons with Tigres, 8 in First Division, in which he scored over 40 goals.

He played many Clásico Regiomontano matches against Tigres arch-rival Rayados de Monterrey. He became the maximum scorer in the history of Tigres for matches of this kind, with eight goals. His record was tied by Walter Gaitán in January 2007.

An injury separated him from the fields, and Tigres consequently separated him from the team in 2001. In 2002, he moved to play with Puebla F.C., a team that has been relegated to Primera División A.

He used to wear the number 16 on his back for every match he played.

In 2003, he returned to Santiago Wanderers, making 11 appearances.

In 2005, he played his first Copa Libertadores de América with Tigres, where he scored some goals.

Nuñez has also played for Unión Española and Everton in Chile and Al-Shoalah in Saudi Arabia.

For his country, Nuñez played 31 matches, scoring 4 goals between 1996 and 2003.

A farewell Clásico Regiomontano match where Nuñez played with special guests from Tigres and Monterrey was scheduled for 4 August 2009 at the Estadio Universitario, Tigres' home stadium.

== Post-retirement ==
He has played fast football with Monterrey Flash.

In 2017, he started a football academy, which ended. Next, he worked for Azteca 7 as an analyst.

== Personal life ==
He lives in Monterrey with his wife.

At the beginning of his playing career, he was nicknamed Huracán Porteño (Hurricane from Valparaíso) due to his speed. Since he was a player of Tigres in Mexico, he is well-known as Diablo Núñez (The Devil Núñez).

== Honours ==
Santiago Wanderers

- Segunda División de Chile: 1995

Tigres UANL

- InterLiga: 2005

Everton

- Primera División de Chile (1): 2008 Apertura
