= Osvaldo Lucas =

Mexican footballer (born 1977)

Personal information
- Full name: Osvaldo Lucas Vázquez
- Date of birth: May 28, 1977 (age 49)
- Place of birth: Tampico, Mexico
- Height: 1.78 m (5 ft 10 in)
- Position: Defender

Senior career*
Years	Team	Apps	(Gls)
2003–2004	Irapuato	29	(1)
2004–2006	Atlante	44	(3)
2006–2007	Necaxa	22	(0)
2007	Jaguares Chiapas	6	(1)
2008	Standard Baku	12	(0)
2008–2009	Jaibos Tampico Madero	27	(1)
2009–2011	Correcaminos UAT	29	(0)
- * Club domestic league appearances and goals

Osvaldo Lucas Vázquez (born 28 May 1977) is a retired Mexican football player who played as a defender.

Lucas made his professional debut on 3 August 2003 for Irapuato FC, before moving to Atlante during the summer of 2004.

During the winter transfer window of the 2007-08, Lucas became the first Mexican to play in the Azerbaijan Premier League by signing for Standard Baku. His debut came on 17 February 2008 in a 1–0 defeat away to Gabala.

== Career statistics ==
Club statistics
Season	Club	League	League		Cup		Other		Total	
Season	Club	League	App	Goals	App	Goals	App	Goals	App	Goals
2003 Apertura	Irapuato	Liga MX	18	1			—		18	1
2004 Clausura	Irapuato	Liga MX	11	0			—		11	0
2004 Apertura	Atlante	Liga MX	16	2			—		16	2
2005 Clausura	Atlante	Liga MX	14	1			—		14	1
2005 Apertura	Atlante	Liga MX	10	0			—		10	0
2006 Clausura	Atlante	Liga MX	4	0			—		4	0
2006 Apertura	Necaxa	Liga MX	11	0			—		11	0
2007 Clausura	Necaxa	Liga MX	11	0			—		11	0
2007 Apertura	Jaguares Chiapas	Liga MX	6	1			—		6	1
2007–08	Standard Baku	Azerbaijan Premier League	12	0			—		12	0
2008–09	Jaibos Tampico Madero	Ascenso MX	27	1			—		27	1
2009–10	Correcaminos UAT	Ascenso MX	23	0			—		23	0
2010–11	Correcaminos UAT	Ascenso MX	6	0			—		6	1
Total	Mexico		157	6			-	-	157	6
Total	Azerbaijan		12	0			-	-	12	0
Total			169	6			-	-	169	6
