= 2004 InterLiga =

InterLiga

Tournament details
- Host countries: Mexico; USA
- Dates: 4 January 2004 - 14 January 2004
- Teams: 8 (from the FMF confederations)
- Venue: 7 (in 7 host cities)

Tournament statistics
- Matches played: 16
- Goals scored: 50 (3.13 per match)
- Attendance: 155,344 (9,709 per match)
- Top scorer: (Chile) Reinaldo Navia (6 goals)

The 2004 InterLiga was the 1st edition of the tournament in which two Mexican clubs got the opportunity to represent the FMF and Mexico in 2004 Copa Libertadores.

== Venues ==
City	Stadium Name	Capacity
Carson, CA	Home Depot Center	27,000
Dallas, TX	Cotton Bowl	76,000
Guadalajara, Jalisco	Estadio Jalisco	60,000
Houston, TX	Robertson Stadium	32,000
México DF	Estadio Azteca	114,600
San Jose, CA	Spartan Stadium	30,578
Stockton, CA	Stagg Memorial Stadium	28,000

== Qualification ==
Pos	Team	Pld	W	D	L	GF	GA	GD	Pts	Qualification
1	Toluca	38	22	8	8	95	55	+40	74	
2	América	38	21	9	8	63	34	+29	72	
3	Morelia	38	19	10	9	69	43	+26	67	
4	Atlante	38	16	11	11	70	59	+11	59	
5	Guadalajara	38	14	16	8	60	53	+7	58	
6	UANL	38	16	9	13	57	55	+2	57	
7	Santos Laguna	38	16	8	14	60	52	+8	56	
8	Monterrey	38	14	14	10	49	42	+7	56	CONCACAF Champions' Cup 2004 (Note: Monterrey originally had the right to play in the InterLiga 2004, but had to play in the CONCACAF Champions' Cup 2004 so their spot was taken by Atlas.)
9	Atlas	38	15	9	14	57	51	+6	54	

== Group stage ==
=== Group A ===
Team	Pld	W	D	L	GF	GA	GD	Pts
Santos Laguna	3	2	0	1	6	5	+1	6
Morelia	3	2	0	1	5	6	−1	6
Toluca	3	2	0	1	4	3	+1	6
Guadalajara	3	0	0	3	3	6	−3	0

=== Group B ===
Team	Pld	W	D	L	GF	GA	GD	Pts
Atlas	3	2	1	0	8	3	+5	7
América	3	1	2	0	6	5	+1	5
UANL	3	1	1	1	4	5	−1	4
Atlante	3	0	0	3	5	10	−5	0

== Finals ==
=== Final 1 ===
2004-01-14

Santos Laguna (Mexico)	2 – 2	(Mexico) Atlas
Borgetti 23'; Ruiz 39'	Report	Morales 23'; Rodríguez 62' (o.g.)
Penalties
Borgetti (penalty scored); Ruiz (penalty scored); Peralta (penalty missed); Cariño (penalty scored); Noriega (penalty scored)	4 – 3	(penalty scored) Pérez; (penalty scored) Salazar; (penalty scored) Herrera; (penalty missed) Pinheiro; (penalty missed) Morales

Home Depot Center, Carson, California
Referee: Kevin Stott (United States)

=== Final 2 ===
2004-01-13

Morelia (Mexico)	1 – 3	(Mexico) América
Palacios 80'	Report	González 23'; Navia 31'; Blanco 80'

Home Depot Center, Carson, California
Referee: Alex Prus (United States)

=== Reclassification ===
This round was played only in this edition; it was contested by the loser of Final 1 and the winner of Final 2, and was played over two legs. The winner qualified to the Copa Libertadores.

1st leg

2004-01-21

América (Mexico)	2 – 1	(Mexico) Atlas
Navia 65' 74'	Report	Morales 10'

Estadio Azteca, Mexico City
Referee: Jorge Eduardo Gasso (Mexico)

2nd leg

2004-01-28

Atlas (Mexico)	1 – 2	(Mexico) América
Morales 16'	Report	Ortíz 42'; Blanco 90'

Estadio Jalisco, Guadalajara, Jalisco
Referee: Gilberto Alcala (Mexico)

== Goalscorers ==
The scorers from the 2004 InterLiga

Rank	Name	Team	Goals
1	(Chile) Reinaldo Navia	América	6
2	(Mexico) Jared Borgetti	Santos Laguna	4
2	(Mexico) Manuel Pérez	Atlas	4
2	(Uruguay) Carlos María Morales	Atlas	4
5	(Chile) Sebastián González	Atlante	3
5	(Mexico) Cuauhtémoc Blanco	América	3
7	(Argentina) Ariel González	América	2
7	(Honduras) Carlos Pavón	Morelia	2
7	(Mexico) Miguel Ángel Zepeda	Toluca	2
7	(Mexico) Omar Bravo	Guadalajara	2
7	(Argentina) Damián Álvarez	Santos Laguna	2
