= Primera División de México Apertura 2005 =

Primera División de México
- Season: 2005−06
- Champions: Toluca (8th title)
- Champions' Cup: Toluca
- Copa Libertadores: UNAM; UANL; Guadalajara (First Stage)
- Copa Sudamericana: Toluca
- Top goalscorer: Sebastian Abreu; Kléber Boas; Walter Gaitán; Vicente Matías Vuoso (11 goals)

Primera División de México (Mexican First Division) Apertura 2005 was the 2005 edition of the Primera Division de Mexico, crowning Mexico's fall champion in football. The season ran from August to December 2005. San Luis was promoted to the Primera División de México thus, Puebla was relegated to the Primera División A. Toluca won the championship and qualified for the CONCACAF Champions' Cup 2006.

== Clubs ==
Location of the Primera División Apertura 2005 teams

Team	City	Stadium
América	Mexico City	Azteca
Atlante	Mexico City	Azteca
Atlas	Guadalajara, Jalisco	Jalisco
Chiapas	Tuxtla Gutiérrez, Chiapas	Víctor Manuel Reyna
Cruz Azul	Mexico City	Azul
Guadalajara	Guadalajara, Jalisco	Jalisco
Morelia	Morelia, Michoacán	Morelos
Monterrey	Monterrey, Nuevo León	Tecnológico
Necaxa	Aguascalientes, Aguascalientes	Victoria
Pachuca	Pachuca, Hidalgo	Hidalgo
San Luis	San Luis Potosí, S.L.P.	Alfonso Lastras
Santos Laguna	Torreón, Coahuila	Corona
Sinaloa	Culiacán, Sinaloa	Banorte
Toluca	Toluca, State of Mexico	Nemesio Díez
UAG	Zapopan, Jalisco	Tres de Marzo
UANL	San Nicolás de los Garza, Nuevo León	Universitario
UNAM	Mexico City	Olímpico Universitario
Veracruz	Veracruz, Veracruz	Luis "Pirata" Fuente

== Regular phase ==
Group 1
Pos	Team	Pld	W	D	L	GF	GA	GD	Pts	Qualification
1	América	17	12	2	3	34	22	+12	38	Automatically qualified for the Liguilla (Playoffs)
2	Necaxa	17	9	4	4	35	31	+4	31	Automatically qualified for the Liguilla (Playoffs)
3	UAG	17	7	3	7	27	28	−1	24	Qualified for Liguilla (Playoffs) on a points basis
4	Morelia	17	6	2	9	27	29	−2	20	
5	San Luis	17	4	4	9	18	25	−7	16	
6	Atlante	17	4	3	10	29	37	−8	15	

Source: MedioTiempo

Group 2
Pos	Team	Pld	W	D	L	GF	GA	GD	Pts	Qualification
1	Toluca	17	9	3	5	27	21	+6	30	Automatically qualified for the Liguilla (Playoffs)
2	Pachuca	17	7	7	3	26	18	+8	28	Automatically qualified for the Liguilla (Playoffs)
3	Santos Laguna	17	5	5	7	31	31	0	20	
4	Sinaloa	17	5	3	9	20	31	−11	18	
5	UNAM	17	4	4	9	17	34	−17	16	
6	Veracruz	17	3	6	8	24	34	−10	15	

Source: MedioTiempo

Group 3
Pos	Team	Pld	W	D	L	GF	GA	GD	Pts	Qualification
1	Monterrey	17	10	5	2	32	20	+12	35	Automatically qualified for the Liguilla (Playoffs)
2	Cruz Azul	17	9	3	5	34	20	+14	30	Automatically qualified for the Liguilla (Playoffs)
3	UANL	17	6	4	7	30	25	+5	22	Qualified for Liguilla (Playoffs) on a points basis
4	Atlas	17	6	3	8	22	24	−2	21	
5	Chiapas	17	5	8	4	30	27	+3	20 (Note: Jaguares de Chiapas deducted 3 points for insufficient use of youth team players.)	
6	Guadalajara	17	4	7	6	16	22	−6	19	

Source: MedioTiempo

== League table ==
Pos	Team	Pld	W	D	L	GF	GA	GD	Pts	Qualification
1	América	17	12	2	3	34	22	+12	38	Automatically qualified for the Liguilla (Playoffs)
2	Monterrey	17	10	5	2	32	20	+12	35	Automatically qualified for the Liguilla (Playoffs)
3	Necaxa	17	9	4	4	35	31	+4	31	Automatically qualified for the Liguilla (Playoffs)
4	Cruz Azul	17	9	3	5	34	20	+14	30	Automatically qualified for the Liguilla (Playoffs)
5	Toluca	17	9	3	5	27	21	+6	30	Automatically qualified for the Liguilla (Playoffs)
6	Pachuca	17	7	7	3	26	18	+8	28	Automatically qualified for the Liguilla (Playoffs)
7	UAG	17	7	3	7	27	28	−1	24	Qualified for Liguilla (Playoffs) on a points basis
8	UANL	17	6	4	7	30	25	+5	22	Qualified for Liguilla (Playoffs) on a points basis
9	Atlas	17	6	3	8	22	24	−2	21	
10	Chiapas	17	5	8	4	30	27	+3	20 (Note: Jaguares de Chiapas deducted 3 points for insufficient use of youth team players.)	
11	Santos Laguna	17	5	5	7	31	31	0	20	
12	Morelia	17	6	2	9	27	29	−2	20	
13	Guadalajara	17	4	7	6	16	22	−6	19	
14	Sinaloa	17	5	3	9	20	31	−11	18	
15	San Luis	17	4	4	9	18	25	−7	16	
16	UNAM	17	4	4	9	17	34	−17	16	
17	Atlante	17	4	3	10	29	37	−8	15	
18	Veracruz	17	3	6	8	24	34	−10	15	

Source: MedioTiempo

== Top goalscorers ==
Players sorted first by goals scored, then by last name. Only regular season goals listed.

Rank	Player	Club	Goals
1	(Uruguay) Sebastian Abreu	Sinaloa	11
1	(Brazil) Kléber Boas	América	11
1	(Argentina) Walter Gaitán	UANL	11
1	(Argentina) Vicente Matías Vuoso	Santos Laguna	11
5	(Paraguay) Salvador Cabañas	Chiapas	9
5	(Argentina) César Delgado	Cruz Azul	9
5	(Mexico) Guillermo Franco	Monterrey	9
5	(Chile) Patricio Galaz	Atlante	9
5	(Argentina) Daniel Ludueña	UAG	9
5	(Mexico) Carlos Ochoa	Chiapas	9
5	(Chile) Rodrigo Ruiz	Santos Laguna	9

Source: MedioTiempo

== Results ==
Home \ Away	AME	ATE	ATS	CHI	CAZ	GDL	MTY	MOR	NEC	PAC	SNL	SAN	SIN	TOL	UAG	UNL	UNM	VER
América	—	4–3	–	–	1–0	0–0	–	–	4–1	–	3–1	2–1	2–1	–	–	3–1	–	1–2
Atlante	–	—	–	1–1	–	–	0–2	4–3	2–1	–	–	0–0	–	–	0–1	2–0	–	4–5
Atlas	1–3	1–0	—	0–0	0–1	2–2	–	–	–	3–2	1–0	–	1–2	–	2–1	–	–	–
Chiapas	4–3	–	–	—	–	–	1–2	1–0	1–1	–	–	5–1	–	–	3–3	1–1	5–1	2–2
Cruz Azul	–	5–3	–	3–1	—	0–0	1–2	2–1	–	–	3–0	–	2–2	–	5–1	–	–	–
Guadalajara	–	3–2	–	1–1	–	—	2–3	1–2	1–2	–	–	–	1–0	–	1–0	–	–	1–1
Monterrey	4–1	–	1–0	–	–	–	—	–	1–1	1–2	–	2–2	–	2–1	–	2–1	1–1	1–1
Morelia	1–2	–	1–0	–	–	–	2–2	—	3–4	–	–	1–0	–	3–1	–	0–2	2–2	2–1
Necaxa	–	–	3–5	–	3–1	–	–	–	—	2–1	2–1	4–3	–	0–0	–	3–2	2–0	–
Pachuca	0–0	3–2	–	5–1	0–0	0–0	–	1–3	–	—	0–0	–	2–1	–	1–0	–	–	–
San Luis	–	2–2	–	1–1	–	1–2	1–2	2–1	–	–	—	–	4–1	–	2–1	–	–	1–0
Santos Laguna	–	–	2–2	–	3–2	3–0	–	–	–	0–0	3–1	—	–	4–1	–	1–4	1–2	–
Sinaloa	–	3–1	–	2–1	–	–	1–3	2–1	1–1	–	–	0–3	—	–	0–2	–	-	1–0
Toluca	0–1	1–0	2–1	0–1	2–1	3–0	–	–	–	1–1	2–1	–	2–2	—	–	–	–	–
UAG	1–2	–	–	–	–	–	2–1	2–1	3–2	–	–	3–2	–	1–2	—	1–1	3–1	2–2
UANL	–	–	1–2	–	1–2	1–1	–	–	–	2–2	1–0	–	3–1	1–3		—	3–1	–
UNAM	1–2	2–3	1–0	–	0–5	1–0	–	–	–	1–3	0–0	–	2–0	0–3	–	–	—	–
Veracruz	–	–	2–1	–	0–1	–	–	–	2–3	1–3	–	2–2	–	2–3		0–5	1–1	—

Updated to match(es) played on 26 November 2005. Source: RSSSF
Legend: Blue = home team win; Yellow = draw; Red = away team win.

== Final phase (Liguilla) ==
=== Bracket ===
Quarterfinals
2	Monterrey	3	4	7
7	UAG	0	0	0
1	América	3	1	4
8	UANL	1	4	5
4	Cruz Azul	0	0	0
5	Toluca	1	0	1
3	Necaxa	0	0	0
6	Pachuca	2	2	4

Semifinals
2	Monterrey (s)	0	2	2
8	UANL	1	1	2
5	Toluca	0	2	2
6	Pachuca	0	1	1

Finals
2	Monterrey	3	0	3
5	Toluca	3	3	6

=== Quarterfinals ===
November 30, 2005
19:00

UAG	0–3	Monterrey
	Report	Franco 6', 54'; Casartelli 88' (pen.)

Estadio Tres de Marzo, Zapopan
Referee: Hugo León Guajardo (Mexico City)
December 3, 2005
17:00

Monterrey	4–0	UAG
Franco 2'; Casartelli 73'; Pérez 75', 81'	Report

Estadio Tecnológico, Monterrey
Referee: Jorge Eduardo Gasso (Mexico City)

Monterrey won 7–0 on aggregate.

December 1, 2005
20:45

UANL	1–3	América
Júlio César 76'	Report	Kléber 40'; Pardo 62'; Blanco 70'

Estadio Universitario, San Nicolás de los Garza
Referee: Mauricio Morales (Mexico City)
December 4, 2005
17:00

América	1–4	UANL
Kléber 53'	Report	Peralta 18'; Gaitán 22', 35'; Júlio César 90'

Estadio Azteca, Mexico City
Referee: Marco Antonio Rodríguez (Mexico City)

UANL won 5–4 on aggregate.

December 1, 2005
15:00

Toluca	1–0	Cruz Azul
Esquivel 62'	Report

Estadio Nemesio Díez, Toluca
Referee: Gilberto Alcalá Pineda (Mexico City)
December 4, 2005
20:00

Cruz Azul	0–0	Toluca
	Report

Estadio Azul, Mexico City
Referee: Manuel Ernesto Glower (Mexico City)

Toluca won 1–0 on aggregate.

November 30, 2005
21:00

Pachuca	2–0	Necaxa
Landín 16'; Cacho 33'	Report

Estadio Hidalgo, Pachuca
Referee: Armando Archundia (Estado de México)
December 3, 2005
20:30

Necaxa	0–2	Pachuca
	Report	Landín 27'; Caballero 47'

Estadio Victoria, Aguascalientes
Referee: Germán Arredondo Ramírez (Guanajuato)

Pachuca won 4–0 on aggregate.

=== Semifinals ===
December 7, 2005
20:45

UANL	1–0	Monterrey
Peralta 54'	Report

Estadio Universitario, San Nicolás de los Garza
Referee: Armando Archundia (Estado de México)
December 10, 2005
17:00

Monterrey	2–1	UANL
Pérez 57' (pen.); Franco 85'	Report	Gaitán 73'

Estadio Tecnológico, Monterrey
Referee: Germán Arredondo Ramírez (Guanajuato)

2–2 on aggregate. Monterrey advanced for being the higher seeded team.

December 8, 2005
20:45

Pachuca	0–0	Toluca
	Report

Estadio Hidalgo, Pachuca
Referee: Jorge Eduardo Gasso (Mexico City)
December 11, 2005
15:00

Toluca	2–1	Pachuca
da Silva 10'; Esquivel 43'	Report	Santana 33'

Estadio Nemesio Díez, Toluca
Referee: Marco Antonio Rodríguez (Mexico City)

Toluca won 2–1 on aggregate.

=== Final ===
December 15, 2005
15:00

Toluca	3–3	Monterrey
Sánchez 32'; Abundis 45'; Díaz 87'	Report	Pérez 3' (pen.); Casartelli 8' da Silva 61' (o.g.)

Estadio Nemesio Díez, Toluca
Referee: Gilberto Alcalá Pineda (Mexico City)
December 18, 2005
17:00

Monterrey	0–3	Toluca
	Report	Sánchez 50', 90+1'; Díaz 90+3'

Estadio Tecnológico, Monterrey
Referee: Marco Antonio Rodríguez (Mexico City)

Toluca won 6–3 on aggregate.

Champions

8th title
