= Jorge Oropeza =

Mexican footballer (born 1983)

Personal information
- Full name: Jorge Arturo Oropeza Torres
- Date of birth: May 4, 1983 (age 43)
- Place of birth: Mexico City, Mexico
- Height: 1.81 m (5 ft 11 in)
- Position: Midfielder

Senior career*
Years	Team	Apps	(Gls)
2004–2007	Atlético Mexiquense	81	(3)
2006	→ Toluca (loan)	2	(0)
2007–2008	KS Flamurtari Vlorë	1	(0)
2008	FCM Bacău	0	(0)
Total		84	(3)
- * Club domestic league appearances and goals as of 4 July 2010 ‡ National team caps and goals as of 30 July 2007

Jorge Arturo Oropeza Torres (born 4 May 1983) is a Mexican former professional footballer.
