= Mario Hernández (footballer, born 1979) =

Mexican footballer

Personal information
- Full name: Mario Alberto Hernández Lash
- Date of birth: January 24, 1979 (age 47)
- Place of birth: Monterrey, Nuevo León, Mexico
- Height: 1.75 m (5 ft 9 in)
- Position: Defender

Senior career*
Years	Team	Apps	(Gls)
2002–2009	Atlante F.C.	143	(11)
2008	Potros Chetumal	9	(0)
- * Club domestic league appearances and goals

Mario Alberto Hernández Lash (born January 24, 1979) is a Mexican former football defender.

Hernández debuted with Atlante F.C. on September 29, 2002, during a 2–0 loss to CF Monterrey. From there, he became a common fixture in the Potros starting line-up, often delighting fans with his top-notch defending. But after winning the Apertura 2007 title with Atlante, he fell out of the coach's plans. Most recently, he has been playing with Atlante's filial team, Potros Chetumal as their captain.

== Honors ==
=== Club ===
Atlante F.C.

- (Mexico) Apertura 2007
