= Ángel Bernuncio =

Argentine footballer and manager

Personal information
- Full name: Ramón Ángel Bernuncio Almaraz
- Date of birth: 15 June 1965 (age 61)
- Place of birth: Buenos Aires, Argentina
- Height: 1.78 m (5 ft 10 in)
- Position: Midfielder

Senior career*
Years	Team	Apps	(Gls)
1987–1990	San Lorenzo	101	(1)
1990–1991	Lanús	32	(0)
1991–1992	Barcelona S.C.	26	(1)
1992–1993	Necaxa	36	(2)
1993–1994	Toros Neza	33	(1)
1994–1995	Mandiyú	26	(1)
1995–1996	Platense	14	(0)
1996–1997	Olimpo		
1998–1999	Juventud Antoniana		

Managerial career
- 2002–2003: Juventud Antoniana
- 2006: Club Almagro
- 2007: Barcelona S.C.
- 2007–2008: Tigres de la UANL
- * Club domestic league appearances and goals

Ramón Ángel Bernuncio Almaraz (born 15 June 1965 in Buenos Aires), also known as Ángel Bernuncio, is a retired Argentine football midfielder who played for several clubs in Argentina and Mexico, including San Lorenzo, Lanús and Club Necaxa. Bernuncio has managed several clubs after finishing his playing career, including Club Almagro, Barcelona S.C. and Tigres de la UANL. Actually is DT of Club Atlético All Boys.
