= Ariel Rosada =

Argentine footballer

Personal information
- Full name: Javier Ariel Rosada
- Date of birth: April 11, 1978 (age 48)
- Place of birth: Campana, Buenos Aires Province, Argentina
- Height: 1.81 m (5 ft 11 in)
- Position: Defensive midfielder

Senior career*
Years	Team	Apps	(Gls)
1996–1998	Boca Juniors	12	(0)
1998–1999	AZ Alkmaar	?	(?)
1999	Boca Juniors	1	(0)
1999–2003	Chacarita Juniors	55	(0)
2003–2005	Newell's Old Boys	60	(0)
2005–2008	Toluca	75	(2)
2008–2009	Celta Vigo	49	(0)
2009–2010	Boca Juniors	23	(0)
2010–2011	Banfield	22	(0)
2011–2012	Olimpo	30	(0)
2012–2013	Villa Dálmine	7	(0)
- * Club domestic league appearances and goals as of 13:25, 7 April 2013 (UTC)

Javier Ariel Rosada (born 11 April 1978 in Campana, Buenos Aires Province, Argentina) is an Argentine midfielder. He is known for his uncompromising tackling and resolutely defensive playing style.

Rosada began to play professionally in Argentina in 1995 with Boca Juniors in the Argentine Primera División. In 1998, he joined the Dutch club AZ Alkmaar, but returned to Boca after one year. In the same year, he joined another Argentine team, Chacarita Juniors, in Primera B Nacional until 2003 when joined Newell's Old Boys in Rosario. In 2005, he left for the "Diablos Rojos", Toluca. He was then transferred from Celta to play for Boca Juniors.

== Honours ==
Season	Club	Title
Apertura 1998	Boca Juniors	Argentine Primera División
Clausura 1999	Boca Juniors	Argentine Primera División
Apertura 2004	Newell's Old Boys	Argentine Primera División
Apertura 2005	Toluca	Mexican Primera División
