= Pablo Granoche =

Uruguayan footballer (born 1983)

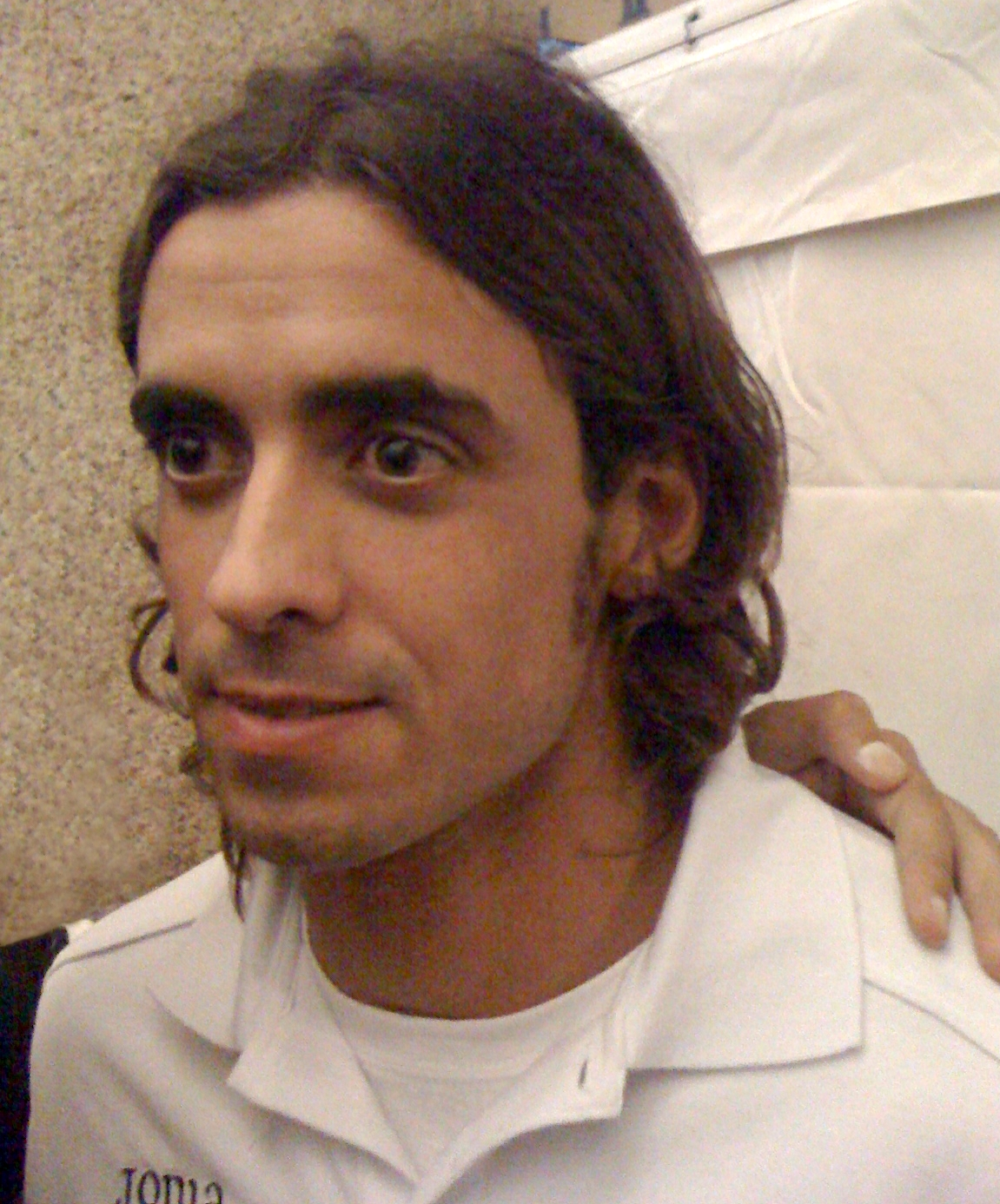

Personal information
- Full name: Pablo Mariano Granoche Louro
- Date of birth: 5 September 1983 (age 43)
- Place of birth: Montevideo, Uruguay
- Height: 1.82 m (6 ft 0 in)
- Position: Striker

Team information
- Current team: FC Clivense (assistant)

Senior career*
| Years | Team | Apps | (Gls) |
| 2000 | Tacuarembó | 1 | (0) |
| 2001–2002 | River Plate Montevideo | 9 | (0) |
| 2002–2005 | Miramar Misiones | 56 | (38) |
| 2005 | Toluca | 13 | (2) |
| 2006 | Veracruz | 15 | (1) |
| 2006–2007 | Coatzacoalcos | 27 | (23) |
| 2007–2008 | Triestina | 38 | (24) |
| 2008–2013 | Chievo | 47 | (4) |
| 2008–2009 | → Triestina (loan) | 24 | (7) |
| 2011–2012 | → Novara (loan) | 11 | (0) |
| 2012 | → Varese (loan) | 16 | (6) |
| 2012–2013 | → Padova (loan) | 19 | (2) |
| 2013 | Cesena | 19 | (4) |
| 2013–2014 | Chievo | 0 | (0) |
| 2013–2014 | → Cesena (loan) | 9 | (1) |
| 2014 | → Modena (loan) | 19 | (10) |
| 2014–2016 | Modena | 69 | (25) |
| 2016–2018 | Spezia | 73 | (19) |
| 2018–2021 | Triestina | 92 | (30) |
| 2021–2022 | Vigasio | 11 | (6) |

International career
| 2005 | Uruguay | 1 | (0) |
- * Club domestic league appearances and goals as of 16 May 2021

Pablo Mariano Granoche Louro (born 5 September 1983) is a Uruguayan football coach and former player, in the role of striker, currently in charge as assistant coach of FC Clivense in the Eccellenza amateur league. During his playing career, he was nicknamed El Diablo.

== Playing career ==
He started his professional career with Tacuarembó, and was successively signed by Club Atlético River Plate (Uruguay) for the 2000–2001 clausura season. His breakthrough however came during his time at Miramar Misiones, where he scored 38 goals in 56 matches being noted and then signed by Mexican club Toluca. He however failed to impress while at Toluca, and soon left for Veracruz, where he however scored only a single goal during his stay at the club. He spent the 2006–07 with Mexican Second Division side Coatzacoalcos.

=== Triestina ===
Noted by an Italian scout, he was reported to Serie B club Triestina, who signed him in an alleged €1,000,000 bid. However, in fact the club paid a proxy club Centro Atlético Fénix €500,000.

Since his arrival at Triestina, he impressed both football fans and pundits thanks to a strong start, scoring 24 goals during the 36 matches with the alabardati.

=== Chievo ===
Granoche moved to Chievo in a co-ownership bid on 21 August 2008, for €400,000, but loaned back to Trieste on 1 September. Chievo also subsided Triestina €400,000 as premi di valorizzazione for the loan. In 2016 the Italian Football Federation (FIGC) also found Chievo had also paid a company called International Sport Services S.r.l. for €240,000, violating the regulation of the federation. During the loan, Triestina also paid the same company €100,000. The company was owned by football agents Fabio Grossi and Maurizio De Giorgis, which FIGC also penalized for conflicts of interest in representing both the player and clubs such as Chievo, Triestina, Novara, Varese and Cesena.

Granoche returned to Chievo on 1 July 2009. He played 30 games for the club in 2009–10 Serie A.

After Triestina was relegated from Serie B in 2010, he was acquired by Chievo outright on 24 June 2010 for a nominal fee of just €1,000, making his transfer fee was €641,000 in total (or €1,041,000 including the subsidy).

In July 2011 he joined newly promoted Serie A club Novara on loan until the end of the season, for a loan fee of €400,000.

On 16 July 2012 Granoche moved to Serie B club Padova on a loan deal for the 2012–13 Serie B.

=== Cesena ===
In the second part of the 2012–13 league campaign, Chievo gifted half of the registration rights of Granoche to Cesena for just €500. on 20 June 2013 Chievo bought back Granoche in a 3-year deal. However, 2 weeks after returning to Chievo, on 12 July 2013, he was re-signed to Cesena on loan for the 2013–14 season.

=== Modena ===
On 31 January 2014, Granoche was loaned to Serie B side Modena for the remainder of the 2013–14 season. He recorded 10 goals in 21 matches until the end of the season. With his highly impressive loan spell, Modena acquired him from Chievo on a permanent basis on 14 July 2014, for €340,000 fee.

Granoche was also suspended once on 6 September 2015, due to receiving extra employee benefits for €25,000, on 30 June 2008, from Stefano Mario Fantinel, the president of Triestina directly. Due to employing an agent who had a conflict of interest, Granoche was suspended for 2 matches again in 2016.

=== Spezia ===
Granoche was signed by Spezia on 31 August 2016 on a free transfer. During that summer transfer window, along with other free agents, he also obtained the license to be a youth team coach (UEFA B License).

=== Amateur ===
On 9 August 2021, he joined SSD Vigasio, playing in the amateur levels.

== Coaching career ==
In July 2022, Granoche was named new assistant coach to Riccardo Allegretti at Eccellenza club FC Clivense.
