= Manuel de la Torre =

Mexican footballer (born 1980)

Manuel de La Torre
Personal information
- Full name: Manuel Alejandro de la Torre Urbina
- Date of birth: June 13, 1980 (age 46)
- Place of birth: Mexico City, Mexico
- Height: 1.71 m (5 ft 7 in)
- Position: Defender

Team information
- Current team: Toluca U-17 (Assistant)

Senior career*
Years	Team	Apps	(Gls)
1999–2004	Pumas UNAM	103	(4)
2004–2014	Toluca	271	(9)
2012–2013	→ Lobos de la BUAP (loan)	1	(0)
2013–2014	→ Tigres UANL (loan)	1	(0)

Managerial career
- 2019–2020: Pumas UNAM (youth)
- 2020–2021: Pumas Tabasco (Assistant)
- 2021–2022: Pumas UNAM (youth)
- 2023–: Toluca (youth)
- * Club domestic league appearances and goals as of 24 April 2013

Manuel Alejandro de la Torre Urbina (born June 13, 1980) is a former Mexican football defender.

== Career ==
De la Torre began playing football as a defender with Club Universidad Nacional's youth sides. He progressed to Pumas' senior side where he played in the Mexican Primera División until 2004.

He signed with Toluca FC, and would win four league titles with the club. In February 2011, he was named a member of Toluca's Hall of Fame.

== Honors ==
Toluca

- Primera División de México (3): Apertura 2005, Apertura 2008, Primera División de México Bicentenario 2010

Tigres UANL

- Copa MX (1): Clausura 2014
