= Gerónimo Barbadillo =

Peruvian footballer (born 1954)

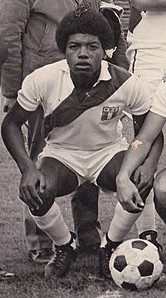

Personal information
- Full name: Gerónimo Barbadillo González
- Date of birth: 29 September 1954 (age 72)
- Place of birth: Lima, Lima Province, Peru
- Height: 1.79 m (5 ft 10 1/2 in)
- Position: Right winger

Senior career*
Years	Team	Apps	(Gls)
1972–1973	Sport Boys	?	(?)
1974–1975	Defensor Lima	?	(?)
1976–1982	Tigres	188	(61)
1982–1985	Avellino	81	(10)
1985–1986	Udinese Calcio	22	(2)
1987–1988	A.S.D. Sanvitese		
1991–1992	S.V. Milland		

International career
1972–1985	Peru	20	(3)
- * Club domestic league appearances and goals

Gerónimo Barbadillo González (born September 29, 1954) is a retired Peruvian footballer.

A right winger, he spent his best seasons with Tigres UANL of the Liga MX and was known for his speed, dribbling and goal-scoring ability. He also played for Avellino and Udinese in Serie A. He participated in the 1982 FIFA World Cup with the Peru national football team.

He is nicknamed "Patrulla" ("Patrol") because of his afro hairstyle the resemblance to Linc Hayes (played by Clarence Williams III) in the American TV series "The Mod Squad" due the Spanish translation of the name of the show, which is "Patrulla Juvenil".

An icon of Tigres, the team honored him when they retired the kit number 7.

== Biography ==
Barbadillo started playing in 1972 with Sport Boys. In 1974, he moved to play for Defensor Lima. In 1975, he arrived in Monterrey, Mexico to play for Tigres. With Tigres he conquered a domestic cup or Copa México against Club América in 1976 and two Mexican League championships, first against Pumas UNAM in 1978 and against Atlante in 1982. He scored over 60 goals in six years and formed a special association in the pitch with Mexican historical creative midfielder Tomás Boy. Aside from his goalscoring, Barbadillo also played 17 Clásico Regiomontano derby matches against Monterrey, Tigres' main rival. Because he is considered one of the best players the team has ever had, his number, #7, has been retired and immortalized.

Barbadillo then moved in 1982 to Italy to play for Avellino, after his magnificent performance in the FIFA World Cup. He played later for Udinese in 1985–86. He has retired as a player and lives in Italy. He has been in charge of Udinese's youth team since 2005.

== Honours ==
=== Tigres ===
- Primera División
  - Winner (2): 1977–78, 1981–82
  - Runner-up (1): 1979–80
- Copa de Mexico
  - Winner (1): 1975–76

=== Peru national football team ===
- Copa America
  - Winner (1): 1975

=== Individual ===
- Mexican Primera División Golden Ball: 1981–82
- Serie A Team of The Year: 1983, 1984
