= Sebastian González (footballer, born 1978) =

Chilean footballer (born 1978)

Sebastián González
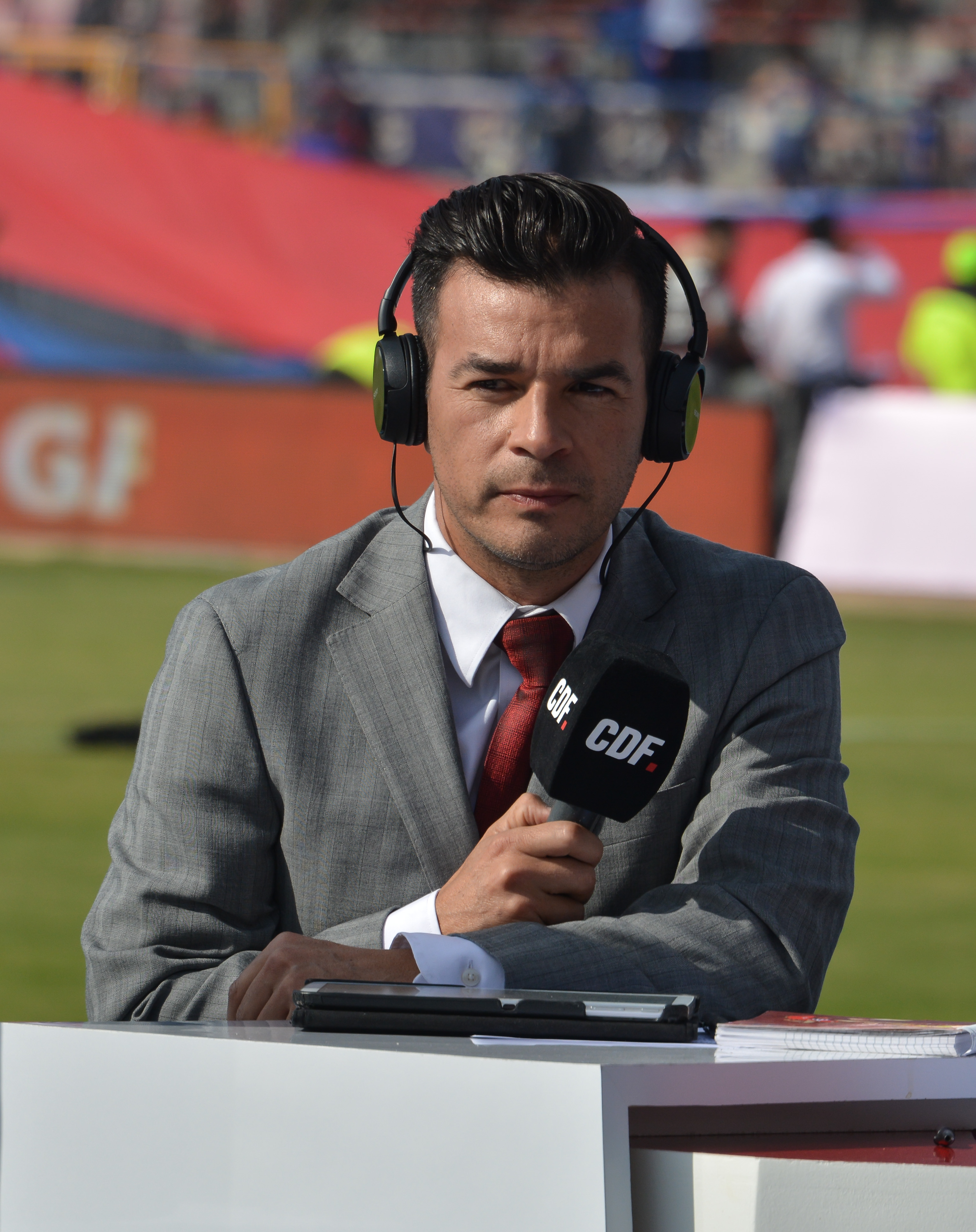
- González in 2018

Personal information
- Full name: Sebastián Ignacio González Valdés
- Date of birth: 14 December 1978 (age 47)
- Place of birth: Viña del Mar, Chile
- Height: 1.73 m (5 ft 8 in)
- Position: Striker

Youth career
- 1991–1997: Colo-Colo

Senior career*
Years	Team	Apps	(Gls)
1998–2002	Colo-Colo	74	(27)
1999–2000	Colo-Colo Juniors	–	(–)
2002–2005	Atlante	119	(72)
2006–2008	Tigres	30	(9)
2007	→ Veracruz (loan)	16	(1)
2007	→ Olimpo	14	(3)
2008	Tecos	13	(5)
2008–2009	León	15	(6)
2009	→ Colo-Colo (loan)	17	(1)
2009–2010	APOP Kinyras	24	(9)
2010–2011	Potros Neza	27	(8)
2011–2012	The Strongest	25	(7)
2012	Caracas	9	(0)
2013	Palestino	4	(0)
2013–2014	Deportes Temuco	16	(2)
Total		420	(150)

International career
2000	Chile U23		
2001–2005	Chile	17	(6)
Medal record
Representing Chile
Men's Football
Bronze medal – third place	2000 Sydney	Team competition
- * Club domestic league appearances and goals

Sebastián Ignacio González Valdés (Spanish pronunciation: [seβasˈtjaŋ ɡonˈsales]; born 14 December 1978), also known as Chamagol, is a Chilean former professional footballer who played as striker.

== Club career ==
He began his football career at Colo-Colo of the first tier of his country, in which he scored 27 goals in 77 appearances during four seasons. In June 2002, he was sold for an undisclosed fee (believed to be a high sum) to Mexican Primera División club Atlante. In his first season with that club, the Apertura Tournament of the same year, González scored 13 goals in 19 appearances and in the following, the 2003 Clausura Tournament, he netted 16 goals in the same number of games, becoming the league's top scorer.

There were rumors saying that González was asking for more money from Atlante and that he was not happy to be there. They did give him a raise but that still did not help him want to stay on the team. He was sold to Tigres for about 3.5 million if not 4 million dollars. In the press conference he claimed that his goal was to score over 20 goals in the season. When asked by a reporter why he had chosen such a high number of goals, he responded by saying, "last season I set a number of goals as my goal, and I beat that number. So I want to beat my goal of 20 goals this season."

After a successful pass at the club of Cancún, which back then played at Estadio Azteca as well as Neza 86 Stadiums, both at Mexico City, González was sold in January 2006 to UANL Tigres of the same league and country. In the next season, was loaned to Tiburones Rojos de Veracruz and the Argentine Primera División club in that moment, Olimpo de Bahía Blanca. In 2008, he signed for Liga de Ascenso of Mexican side León, in where was received by several fans in his first training of the club. In January of the next year, he returned to Colo-Colo on loan, being presented in European style by the team's captain Arturo Sanhueza. In his third game for the club, González scored a goal in an historic 3–1 away win over Palmeiras at Parque Antártica.

He joined Cypriot First Division side APOP Kinyras FC, after an unsuccessful season in Colo-Colo, returning in mid-year to Mexico for play in Atlante's filial team Potros Neza, scoring eight goals in 27 games for the Liga de Ascenso tournament. Despite his performance and the will of the Chilean to play again for the first team and stay at Mexico, Atlante did not consider González for the first squad due to his lack of form according to that club's coach, and he signed for the Bolivian giants The Strongest. He is currently signed to Venezuelan club Caracas FC after a successful stint in Bolivia. After just playing nine matches without scoring for the Venezuelan giants despite belong considered one of the most promising signings of the club, González returned to Chile to play for Palestino in the Chilean Primera División; he argued his decision to end his career scoring seven goals which would leave him at 200 goals in his career. Despite his desire to either retire at Atlante or Colo-Colo, where he is considered historic, González said that he was thankful to be received by Palestino as he was willing to return to Chile. He is currently training to be a coach as well.

== International career ==
González played internationally with the Chile national football team at the 2000 Summer Olympics at Sydney, winning the bronze medal also, and in the 2004 Copa América celebrated in Peru. He has scored six goals for his national team in 17 appearances between 2001 and 2005, being two of those officials against Paraguay and Peru.

== Personal life ==
González is the nephew of the Chilean former international footballer Francisco Chamaco Valdés, a historical player of Colo-Colo. Due to the nickname of his uncle, he is known as Chamagol.

== Post-retirement ==
González has worked in different radio and TV media, such as Radio La Clave, Canal del Fútbol (CDF) and ADN Radio.

He graduated as a Sport Manager. In 2021, he was in charge of Deportes Iberia as sports director. In 2022 he assumed the charge of Sports Manager of Deportes Recoleta.

== Career statistics ==
Scores and results list Chile's goal tally first, score column indicates score after each González goal.

List of international goals scored by Sebastián González
No.	Date	Venue	Opponent	Score	Result	Competition
1	17 January 2001	Salt Lake Stadium, Calcutta, India	Uzbekistan	2–0	2–0	Friendly
2	20 January 2001	Salt Lake Stadium, Calcutta, India	Iceland	1–0	2–0	Friendly
3	20 January 2001	Salt Lake Stadium, Calcutta, India	Iceland	2–0	2–0	Friendly
4	21 March 2001	Estadio Olímpico Metropolitano, San Pedro Sula, Honduras	Honduras	1–3	1–3	Friendly
5	14 July 2004	Estadio Monumental Virgen de Chapi, Arequipa, Peru	Paraguay	1–0	1–1	2004 Copa América
6	17 November 2004	Estadio Nacional, Lima, Peru	Peru	1–2	1–2	2006 World Cup Qualifiers

== Honours ==
Colo-Colo

- Primera División de Chile: 1998

Tigres UANL

- InterLiga: 2006

The Strongest

- Bolivian Primera División: 2011 Apertura

Chile

- Olympics bronze medal: 2000
