= Adalberto Palma =

Mexican footballer (born 1981)

Personal information
- Full name: Adalberto Palma Ruiz Galindo
- Date of birth: 3 February 1981 (age 45)
- Place of birth: Mexico City, Mexico
- Height: 1.69 m (5 ft 7 in)

Youth career
- Atlante

Senior career*
| Years | Team | Apps | (Gls) |
| 2002–2005 | Atlante | 23 | (0) |
| 2003–2004 | → Guerreros Acapulco (loan) | 3 | (0) |
| 2005–2006 | Toluca | 1 | (0) |
| 2006–2007 | Puebla | 27 | (3) |
| 2007 | Necaxa | 0 | (0) |
| 2008–2009 | Morelia | 1 | (0) |
| 2009 | Mérida | 0 | (0) |
- * Club domestic league appearances and goals

Adalberto Palma Ruiz Galindo (born 3 February 1981) is a Mexican former football player who played as a defender.
