= 1981–82 Mexican Primera División season =

40th professional season of the top-flight football league in Mexico

Primera División de México
- Season: 1981–82
- Champions: UANL (2nd title)
- Relegated: Tampico Madero
- Champions' Cup: UANL; Atlante
- Matches: 394
- Goals: 1,022 (2.59 per match)

Statistics of Primera División de México for the 1981–82 season.

== Overview ==
It was contested by 20 teams, and UANL won the championship.

Atlético Morelia was promoted from Segunda División.

After the season, the owner of Atlético Español decided to sell the team to the Mexican league. This gave way for Necaxa to come back to play in the 1982-83 season.

Tampico was relegated to Segunda División, however, the oil workers' syndicate acquired the Atletas Campesinos franchise and created a new team called Tampico Madero.

=== Teams ===
Location of the 1981-82 Primera División teams

Team	City	Stadium
América	Mexico City	Azteca
Atlante	Mexico City	Azteca
Atlas	Guadalajara, Jalisco	Jalisco
Atletas Campesinos	Querétaro, Querétaro	Municipal de Querétaro
Atlético Español	Mexico City	Azteca
Atlético Potosino	San Luis Potosí, S.L.P.	Plan de San Luis
Cruz Azul	Mexico City	Azteca
Guadalajara	Guadalajara, Jalisco	Jalisco
León	León, Guanajuato	León
Morelia	Morelia, Michoacán	Venustiano Carranza
Monterrey	Monterrey, Nuevo León	Tecnológico
Neza	Nezahualcóyotl, State of Mexico	José López Portillo
Puebla	Puebla, Puebla	Cuauhtémoc
Tampico	Tampico, Tamaulipas	Tamaulipas
Tecos	Zapopan, Jalisco	Tres de Marzo
Toluca	Toluca, State of Mexico	Toluca 70
UANL	Monterrey, Nuevo León	Universitario
UdeG	Guadalajara, Jalisco	Jalisco
UNAM	Mexico City	Olímpico Universitario
Zacatepec	Zacatepec, Morelos	Agustín Coruco Díaz

== Group stage ==
=== Group 1 ===
Pos	Team	Pld	W	D	L	GF	GA	GD	Pts	Qualification
1	América	38	16	13	9	54	31	+23	45	Playoff
2	UANL	38	16	12	10	58	43	+15	44	Playoff
3	Puebla	38	15	11	12	59	56	+3	41	
4	UNAM	38	12	14	12	64	51	+13	38	
5	Atlas	38	9	8	21	35	67	−32	26	

=== Group 2 ===
Pos	Team	Pld	W	D	L	GF	GA	GD	Pts	Qualification
1	UDG	38	13	17	8	49	35	+14	43	Playoff
2	Deportivo Neza	38	13	17	8	54	43	+11	43	Playoff
3	Cruz Azul	38	14	15	9	51	44	+7	43	
4	Atlético Potosino	38	14	13	11	55	53	+2	41	
5	León	38	6	15	17	41	65	−24	27	

=== Group 3 ===
Pos	Team	Pld	W	D	L	GF	GA	GD	Pts	Qualification or relegation
1	Zacatepec	38	14	17	7	44	29	+15	45	Playoff
2	Atlético Español	38	12	9	17	48	55	−7	33	Playoff
3	Morelia	38	9	14	15	37	49	−12	32	
4	Guadalajara	38	6	15	17	39	55	−16	27	
5	Tampico	38	8	10	20	45	72	−27	26	Relegated

=== Group 4 ===
Pos	Team	Pld	W	D	L	GF	GA	GD	Pts	Qualification
1	Atlante	38	21	11	6	62	31	+31	53	Playoff
2	Monterrey	38	13	14	11	49	56	−7	40	Playoff
3	Atletas Campesinos	38	14	11	13	44	42	+2	39	
4	Toluca	38	12	14	12	53	57	−4	38	
5	Tecos	38	11	14	13	48	55	−7	36	

== Results ==
Home \ Away	AME	ATN	ATL	ACM	ATE	APO	CRA	GDL	LEO	MTY	MOR	NEZ	PUE	TAM	TEC	TOL	UNL	UDG	UNM	ZAC
América		0–0	3–0	3–0	2–2	1–0	1–1	1–1	2–1	5–0	1–0	1–0	3–0	0–1	1–1	2–1	0–1	1–0	2–0	0–0
Atlante	0–0		1–0	1–0	2–0	0–0	3–1	0–1	1–0	0–0	4–1	1–1	0–1	4–1	4–2	3–1	1–1	1–1	3–1	0–1
Atlas	0–3	1–2		0–0	2–1	2–0	1–3	1–0	1–1	0–2	2–1	2–2	1–3	0–0	2–5	1–0	1–3	3–3	2–1	2–0
Atletas Campesinos	2–1	2–2	1–1		1–1	2–1	1–2	1–1	4–0	2–0	1–0	0–2	2–1	2–0	3–0	1–0	1–0	1–1	0–1	1–1
Atlético Español	1–2	1–2	2–0	0–1		2–2	1–3	3–1	3–0	3–2	2–0	0–0	3–0	2–0	2–2	3–1	0–2	1–1	2–2	0–0
Atlético Potosino	2–1	1–0	1–1	1–0	2–0		2–2	1–1	2–3	2–1	1–0	3–1	2–1	5–2	1–0	4–1	2–2	1–1	2–1	2–1
Cruz Azul	0–5	0–0	0–1	2–1	1–0	1–1		4–2	2–0	1–1	0–1	1–1	2–0	3–0	1–1	2–3	0–1	0–0	2–1	1–1
Guadalajara	2–0	0–2	3–0	1–1	1–2	2–3	1–2		2–1	1–2	0–0	2–3	0–3	4–0	1–1	2–2	2–1	0–0	0–1	1–3
León	3–2	2–4	0–0	0–2	1–1	1–1	1–1	1–1		1–2	3–3	0–0	1–1	1–0	3–1	2–0	0–1	0–1	3–1	0–0
Monterrey	1–0	1–0	2–1	2–0	1–0	2–1	1–1	4–2	1–1		4–2	0–0	0–0	4–3	0–1	2–2	1–1	1–1	1–5	0–2
Morelia	1–1	0–1	3–2	0–0	0–1	1–0	1–0	1–0	1–1	1–1		0–1	2–4	1–0	2–4	2–2	1–0	4–1	0–2	0–0
Deportivo Neza	1–1	1–3	1–0	4–3	4–3	6–1	3–2	0–0	2–1	1–1	0–0		0–0	3–0	0–1	5–0	2–1	1–1	1–1	0–0
Puebla	1–3	2–1	1–0	1–2	3–4	2–2	3–4	2–2	2–0	2–3	1–0	3–1		1–1	4–1	1–1	2–0	0–0	1–1	2–1
Tampico	1–1	1–4	4–2	2–3	2–0	1–1	0–1	4–0	1–1	4–2	2–3	2–0	3–2		0–0	0–0	2–2	0–1	1–1	0–0
Tecos	0–2	0–0	2–1	1–1	4–0	2–1	0–0	2–0	1–1	1–1	0–0	1–1	0–1	4–2		2–2	1–0	1–2	1–3	1–0
Toluca	3–0	1–3	3–1	2–1	2–0	1–1	1–2	0–0	3–3	2–1	1–1	2–1	0–1	2–1	1–3		1–1	0–0	2–2	0–1
UANL	2–1	2–2	0–1	4–0	1–0	3–1	1–1	0–0	3–1	3–0	1–1	2–2	1–2	4–1	1–1	1–3		1–0	3–2	3–0
UDG	2–2	1–3	3–0	2–1	0–1	1–0	1–1	1–1	1–0	1–1	2–0	2–0	5–1	3–0	0–1	0–1	5–2		3–1	1–1
UNAM	0–0	1–2	6–0	0–0	3–0	1–1	1–0	2–1	7–2	0–0	1–1	1–2	3–3	2–3	3–2	2–2	1–2	1–1		0–0
Zacatepec	0–0	1–2	1–0	1–0	2–1	3–1	1–1	0–0	4–1	3–1	2–2	1–1	1–1	3–0	4–0	3–1	1–1	1–0	0–2	

Legend: Blue = home team win; Yellow = draw; Red = away team win.

== Relegation playoff ==
May 22, 1982

Atlas	1–0	Tampico
Arturo Magaña 8'	Report

Estadio Jalisco, Guadalajara
May 30, 1982

Tampico	1–0	Atlas
Francisco Fernández 44'	Report

Estadio Tamaulipas, Tampico
June 2, 1982

Tampico	1–3	Atlas
Rubén Romeo Corbo 70'	Report	Francisco Chávez 2' (pen.); David Sepúlveda 41' (own); José Luis Real 62'

Estadio Plan de San Luis, San Luis Potosí

Atlas won 4-2 on aggregate. Tampico was relegated to Segunda División.

== Playoff ==
Quarterfinals
1	Atlante	3	2	5
8	Atlético Español	1	2	3
3	Zacatepec	0	2	2
6	Deportivo Neza	2	1	3
2	América	1	4	5
7	Monterrey	2	1	3
4	UANL	1	2	3
5	UdeG	1	1	2

Semifinals
1	Atlante	1	0	1
6	Deportivo Neza	0	0	0
2	América	0	1	1
4	UANL	2	0	2

Finals
1	Atlante	1	1	2 (1)
4	UANL (p)	2	0	2 (3)

U.A.N.L. won the championship.

=== Quarterfinal ===
May 20, 1982

Atlético Español	1-3	Atlante
Daniel Ricardo Astegiano 63' (pen.)	Report	Rubén Hugo Ayala 50'; Eduardo Moses 54'; Evanivaldo Castro 88'

Estadio Azteca, Mexico City
May 23, 1982

Atlante	2–2	Atlético Español
Eduardo Moses 17'; Evanivaldo Castro 60'	Report	Luis Fernando Tena 1'; Daniel Ricardo Astegiano 69' (pen.)

Estadio Azteca, Mexico City

Atlante won 5-3 on aggregate.

May 20, 1982

Deportivo Neza	2–0	Zacatepec
Aarón Gamal 32'; Carlos Heber Revetria 79'	Report

Estadio José López Portillo, Ciudad Nezahualcóyotl
May 23, 1982

Zacatepec	2–1	Deportivo Neza
Mario Hernández 28', 71'	Report	Daniel Bartolotta 18'

Estadio Agustín Coruco Díaz, Zacatepec

Deportivo Neza won 2-3 on aggregate.

May 19, 1982

Monterrey	2–1	América
Arsenio Ribeca 1'; Everardo Rodríguez Plata 63'	Report	Norberto Outes 73'

Estadio Tecnológico, Monterrey
May 22, 1982

América	4–1	Monterrey
Norberto Outes 22', 50', 78'; Juan Antonio Luna 74'	Report	Arsenio Ribeca 57'

Estadio Azteca, Mexico City

América won 5-3 on aggregate.

May 19, 1982

UdeG	1–1	UANL
Reynaldo Güeldini 8' (pen.)	Report	Gerónimo Barbadillo 43'

Estadio Jalisco, Guadalajara
May 22, 1982

UANL	2–1	UdeG
Oswaldo Batocletti 68'; Tomás Boy 83'	Report	Jorge Dávalos 67 67'

Estadio Universitario, San Nicolás de los Garza

UANL won 3-2 on aggregate.

=== Semi-finals ===
May 27, 1982

Deportivo Neza	0–1	Atlante
	Report	Daniel Montes de Oca 81'

Estadio José López Portillo, Ciudad Nezahualcóyotl
May 30, 1982

Atlante	0–0	Deportivo Neza
	Report

Estadio Azteca, Mexico City

Atlante won 1-0 on aggregate.

May 26, 1982

UANL	2–0	América
Sergio Orduña 29'; Oswaldo Batocletti 87'	Report

Estadio Universitario, San Nicolás de los Garza
May 29, 1982

América	1–0	UANL
Javier Aguirre 76'	Report

UANL won 1-2 on aggregate.

== Final ==
June 3, 1982

UANL	2–1	Atlante
Tomás Boy 54'; Geraldo Goncalvez 90+4'	Report	Eduardo Moses 4'

Estadio Universitario, San Nicolás de los Garza
June 6, 1982

Atlante	1–0	UANL
Evanivaldo Castro 84'	Report
Penalties
	1–3

Estadio Azteca, Mexico City

Aggregate tied. UANL won 1-3 on penalty shootout.

1981-82 winners:

2nd title
