= Manuel Pérez (footballer, born 1980) =

Mexican footballer (born 1980)

Personal information
- Full name: Manuel Pérez Flores
- Date of birth: January 22, 1980 (age 46)
- Place of birth: Guadalajara, Mexico
- Height: 1.73 m (5 ft 8 in)
- Position: Midfielder

Team information
- Current team: Jaguares de Jalisco (assistant)

Senior career*
Years	Team	Apps	(Gls)
2001–2007	Atlas	106	(15)
2007–2013	Monterrey	24	(2)
2008–2009	→ Indios (loan)	23	(0)
2010	→ Toluca (loan)	11	(1)
2011	→ Morelia (loan)	15	(0)
2012	→ Veracruz (loan)	9	(0)
2013	→ Querétaro (loan)	4	(0)
Total		192	(18)

International career
2007	Mexico	1	(0)

Managerial career
- 2020–: Jaguares de Jalisco (assistant)
- * Club domestic league appearances and goals

Manuel Pérez Flores (born 22 January 1980) is a Mexican retired footballer who played as a midfielder.

== Career ==
He is known as El Tripa to teammates and fans alike. He began playing in the Primera División with Club Atlas in the 2001–02 season until his move in 2007 to Rayados de Monterrey in 2007. Pérez was known for his great passing abilities and his outstanding mid-range shots. On 28 February 2007, under manager Hugo Sánchez, Pérez made his debut for the Mexico national football team in a friendly match against Venezuela in San Diego, California.

== International appearances ==
As of 28 February 2007

International appearances
#	Date	Venue	Opponent	Result	Competition
1.	28 February 2007	Qualcomm Stadium, San Diego, United States	Venezuela	3–1	Friendly
