= Rodrigo Díaz (footballer) =

Argentine footballer (born 1981)

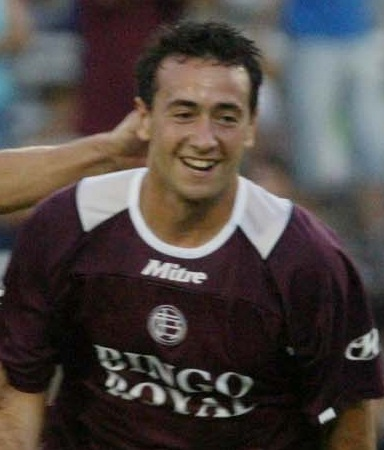
- Díaz playing for Lanús

Personal information
- Full name: Rodrigo Ezequiel Díaz
- Date of birth: 28 August 1981 (age 45)
- Place of birth: Moreno, Argentina
- Height: 1.81 m (5 ft 11 in)
- Position: Attacking midfielder

Youth career
- Lanús

Senior career*
Years	Team	Apps	(Gls)
2001–2005	Lanús	100	(17)
2005–2008	Toluca	35	(7)
2006–2007	→ Independiente (loan)	43	(3)
2008	→ Colón (loan)	14	(0)
2008	Argentinos Juniors	11	(1)
2009	Athletico Paranaense	0	(0)
2009	Huracán	15	(2)
2010	Independiente Rivadavia	11	(1)
2010–2011	Almirante Brown	21	(4)
2011–2015	Deportes Iquique	96	(26)
2015	Almirante Brown	30	(9)
2016–2018	Deportivo Morón	61	(5)
2018–2019	All Boys	23	(6)
- * Club domestic league appearances and goals

Rodrigo Ezequiel Díaz (Spanish pronunciation: [roˈðɾiɣo eseˈkjel ˈdiaθ], born 28 August 1981) is an Argentine former footballer who played as an attacking midfielder. Díaz nickname was El Rengo, the Spanish word for lame or one-legged.

== Teams ==
- (Argentina) Lanús 2001–2005
- (Mexico) Toluca 2005–2006
- (Argentina) Independiente 2006–2007
- (Argentina) Colón 2008
- (Argentina) Argentinos Juniors 2008
- (Brazil) Athletico Paranaense 2009
- (Argentina) Huracán 2009
- (Argentina) Independiente Rivadavia 2010
- (Argentina) Almirante Brown 2010–2011
- (Chile) Deportes Iquique 2011–2015
- (Argentina) Almirante Brown 2015
- (Argentina) Deportivo Morón 2016–2018
- (Argentina) All Boys 2018–2019
