= Walter Gaitán =

Argentine footballer (born 1977)

Personal information
- Full name: Walter Nicolás Gaitán Sayavedra
- Date of birth: March 13, 1977 (age 49)
- Place of birth: La Rioja, Argentina
- Height: 1.85 m (6 ft 1 in)
- Position: Attacking midfielder

Senior career*
| Years | Team | Apps | (Gls) |
| 1997–1998 | Rosario Central | 22 | (6) |
| 1998–2000 | Villarreal | 48 | (7) |
| 2001–2002 | Boca Juniors | 32 | (12) |
| 2002–2007 | Tigres UANL | 179 | (80) |
| 2008–2010 | Necaxa | 18 | (3) |
| 2010 | Veracruz | 4 | (0) |
| 2011 | Los Angeles Blues | 7 | (4) |
| 2011–2012 | Atlético Rafaela | 12 | (1) |
| 2013 | Monterrey Flash (indoor) | 1 | (0) |
| Total | | 323 | (113) |
- * Club domestic league appearances and goals as of 4 November 2013 (UTC)

Walter Nicolás Gaitán Sayavedra (March 13, 1977) is a retired Argentine professional footballer.

An attacking midfielder, Gaitán was known for his vision on the pitch, passing, powerful left shot and a classy ball control. Gaitán played his best seasons with Liga MX club Tigres UANL.

== Career ==
=== Argentina and Spain ===
Walter Gaitán began his career in Argentina with Rosario Central in 1997. He left the team in 1998 and moved to Villarreal of the Spanish Liga. After two years in Spain, he returned to Argentina in early 2001, joining Boca Juniors by request of coach Carlos Bianchi. Gaitán became a regular substitute of Juan Román Riquelme. He scored an early goal in semifinals of the 2001 Copa Libertadores against Palmeiras at the Estádio Palestra Itália. Boca Juniors became the 2001 Copa Libertadores champions.

On September 16, 2001, in the Superclásico of the Apertura 2001 season, at 83' he scored the 1–1 tie against River Plate at the Estadio Monumental. He scored eight goals in 12 matches of the Apertura 2001 season. In 2002, now under Óscar Tabárez, he became a regular starter in League and Copa Libertadores 2002, but gradually lower his level and went to the bench by mid-2002. Gaitán finally left Boca Juniors with 14 goals in 51 matches.

=== Mexico ===
Gaitán moved to Mexico for the 2002 Apertura season, signing with Tigres UANL of the Primera División (First Division, now Liga MX) by request of Ricardo Ferretti. After scoring four goals in 15 games in his first season, he scored eight in the 2003 Clausura. Tigres was eliminated in semifinals of the Clausura 2003 playoffs by crosstown archrival Monterrey. After a remarkable Apertura 2003 season under coach Nery Pumpido, Gaitán and Tigres lost the finals against Pachuca in the Estadio Universitario. In the Apertura 2004, as revenge of the elimination on the Clausura 2003 playoffs, Tigres won the Clásico Regiomontano by the biggest difference ever, beating Monterrey by 6–2, he scored twice. Gaitán became the top goal-scorer of the 2005 Apertura. He was also named Best Player of the Clausura 2006 tournament.

He scored a goal in the 2–1 victory of Tigres over city rival Monterrey in the finals of the 2006 InterLiga and secured 2006 Copa Libertadores. He was selected to wear the number 7, retired to honor team icon Gerónimo Barbadillo, in Copa Libertadores where regulations command that the number be used. Gaitán scored a total of four goals in Copa Libertadores with Tigres. When Tigres qualified for the Copa Libertadores, he wore the shirt of Rosario Central at the celebration.

In October 2007, Gaitán, citing personal reasons, asked for a three-month license to be absent from the team until the end of the season. In December 2007, Club Necaxa announced the incorporation of Gaitán to the team, along with Omar Ortiz. Playing for Necaxa, he scored against Tigres and former archrival Monterrey. In 2010, Gaitán played briefly for Veracruz but was ceased due professional differences.

=== United States ===
In February 2011, Gaitán was officially introduced to the squad for the Los Angeles Blues of the USL Pro.

== Style of play and Legacy ==
Gaitán was nicknamed in Mexico as "El Divino" (Spanish for "The Divine"), due his gifted touch of the ball, vision and feel of the game. In Argentina, he was known as "El Chueco" (Spanish for "The Crooked"), for being left-footed. Gaitán declined to play the 2006 World Cup with Mexico despite the call of then coach, Ricardo La Volpe.

Being a midfielder, he finished the Apertura 2005 season as the top goal scorer of Liga MX with 14 goals. He is one of the top scorers of the Clasico Regiomontano, with eight goals. Gaitán did not achieve the League championship with Tigres, still, he is considered by the media and audience as an icon of the team, next to players such as Tomás Boy, Gerónimo Barbadillo, Osvaldo Batocletti, Claudio Núñez, Lucas Lobos and André-Pierre Gignac.

== Titles ==
| Season | Club | Title |
|---|---|---|
| 2001 | Boca Juniors | Copa Libertadores |
| 2004 | Tigres | Mexican league top scorer |
| 2005 | Tigres | Interliga 2005 |
| 2006 | Tigres | Interliga 2006 |
