= 2005 InterLiga =

InterLiga

Tournament details
- Host country: USA
- Dates: 2 January 2005 – 12 January 2005
- Teams: 8 (from the FMF confederations)
- Venues: 6 (in 6 host cities)

Final positions
- Champions: Tigres UANL and Guadalajara (two qualifying teams)

Tournament statistics
- Matches played: 14
- Goals scored: 50 (3.57 per match)
- Top scorer(s): (Brazil) Irenio Soares (Mexico) Javier Saavedra (3 goals)

The 2005 InterLiga was a tournament organized by the Mexican Football Federation to determine which two Mexican clubs would qualify for the 2005 Copa Libertadores. That year, Mexico was granted three berths; one, designated Mexico 1, was awarded based on league performance, while the remaining two, designated Mexico 2 and Mexico 3, were decided in the InterLiga. The tournament ran from January 2 to January 12.

The group phase of InterLiga remained the same as in 2004, but the final games were changed. The top team from each group plays the second-place team from the opposite group, with both winners advancing to Copa Libertadores. Of the two final winners, the one with the highest point total during group play will be designated "Mexico 2" and automatically advance to the group stage. The other final winner will be "Mexico 3", and will enter the preliminary round of Copa Libertadores.

The tournament was played across six cities in the United States: Phoenix, Houston, Los Angeles, San Antonio, Dallas, and San Jose. Two finals were held on January 12 at Reliant Stadium in Houston.

The eight qualified clubs participated in the following groups:

Group A	Group B
Tigres UANL	Chiapas
Guadalajara	Toluca
Atlante F.C.	America
Santos	Necaxa

== Match schedule ==
Matches at Bank One Ballpark (Phoenix, Arizona)

1.	2 Jan 05	Guadalajara vs Santos	1-1
2.	2 Jan 05	Tigres UANL vs Atlante	2-1

Matches at The Home Depot Center (Carson, California)

3.	2 Jan 05	Necaxa vs Chiapas	0-4
4.	2 Jan 05	América vs Toluca	1-2
9.	8 Jan 05	Atlante vs Santos	4-4
10.	8 Jan 05	Guadalajara vs Tigres UANL	1-0

Matches at Spartan Stadium (San Jose, California)

5.	5 Jan 05	Santos vs Tigres UANL	3-4
6.	5 Jan 05	Atlante vs Guadalajara	3-3

Matches at Alamodome (San Antonio, Texas)

7.	6 Jan 05	Toluca vs Necaxa	2-0
8.	6 Jan 05	Chiapas vs América	1-2

Matches at Cotton Bowl (Dallas, Texas)

11.	9 Jan 05	América vs Necaxa	2-2
12.	9 Jan 05	Toluca vs Chiapas	1-2

Matches at Reliant Stadium (Houston, Texas)

13.	12 Jan 05	Final 1: Tigres UANL vs Toluca	2-0
14.	12 Jan 05	Final 2: Guadalajara vs Chiapas	1-1 (5–3)

== Finals ==
=== Final 1 ===
2005-01-12

Tigres UANL (Mexico)	2 – 0	(Mexico) Toluca
	Report

=== Final 2 ===
2005-01-12

Guadalajara (Mexico)	1 – 1	(Mexico) Chiapas
	Report
Penalties
	5 – 3

== Goalscorers ==
The scorers from the 2005 InterLiga

Rank	Name	Team	Goals
1	(Brazil) Irenio Soares	Tigres UANL	3
1	(Mexico) Javier Saavedra	Tigres UANL	3
3	(Paraguay) José Saturnino Cardozo	Toluca	2
3	(Brazil) Didi	Chiapas	2
3	(Argentina) Diego Garay	Atlante	2
3	(Chile) Patricio Galaz	Atlante	2
3	(Mexico) Héctor Altamirano	Santos Laguna	2
3	(Mexico) Jorge Campos	Santos Laguna	2
