= 2006 InterLiga =

InterLiga

Tournament details
- Host country: USA
- Dates: 5 January 2006 - 15 January 2006
- Teams: 8 (from the FMF confederations)
- Venue: 4 (in 4 host cities)

Tournament statistics
- Matches played: 14

America was originally set to participate in the 2006 InterLiga tournament, but their 2005 clausura championship qualified the team for the 2006 CONCACAF Champions' Cup. Therefore, the club was replaced by Cruz Azul. The teams Tigres and Chivas de Guadalajara qualified to Copa Libertadores 2006

== Groups ==
=== Group A ===
Team	Pld	W	D	L	GF	GA	GD	Pts
Veracruz	3	2	0	1	5	4	+1	6
Monterrey	3	1	2	0	5	4	+1	5
Pachuca	3	1	1	1	5	5	0	4
Monarcas Morelia	3	0	1	2	3	5	−2	1

=== Group B ===
Team	Pld	W	D	L	GF	GA	GD	Pts
Tigres	3	2	0	1	10	7	+3	6
Guadalajara	3	1	2	0	8	6	+2	5
Necaxa	3	1	1	1	4	4	0	4
Cruz Azul	3	0	1	2	2	7	−5	1

== Match schedule ==
Matches at Reliant Stadium (Houston, Texas)

1.	4 Jan 06	Cruz Azul vs Necaxa	0-1
2.	4 Jan 06	UANL vs Guadalajara	3-5

Matches at La Joya Stadium (La Joya, Texas)

3.	5 Jan 06	Pachuca vs Veracruz	2-3
4.	5 Jan 06	Monterrey vs Morelia	2-2

Matches at Pizza Hut Park (Frisco, Texas)

5.	7 Jan 06	Necaxa vs UANL	2-3
6.	7 Jan 06	Guadalajara vs Cruz Azul	2-2
7.	8 Jan 06	Morelia vs Pachuca	1-2
8.	8 Jan 06	Veracruz vs Monterrey	1-2

Matches at The Home Depot Center (Carson, California)

9.	10 Jan 06	Tigres vs Cruz Azul	4-0
10.	10 Jan 06	Necaxa vs Guadalajara	1-1
11.	11 Jan 06	Morelia vs Veracruz	0-1
12.	11 Jan 06	Monterrey vs Pachuca	1-1
13.	15 Jan 06	Final 1: UANL vs Monterrey	2-1 aet
14.	15 Jan 06	Final 2: Veracruz vs Guadalajara	1-2

== Finals ==
=== Final 1 ===
2006-01-15

UANL (Mexico)	2 – 1	(Mexico) Monterrey
	Report

=== Final 2 ===
2006-01-15

Veracruz (Mexico)	1 – 2	(Mexico) Guadalajara
	Report
