= 2002–03 Cruz Azul season =

Cruz Azul
2002–03 season
- Chairman: Guillermo Álvarez Cuevas
- Manager: José Luis Trejo (until 13 December); Mario Carrillo (from 25 December until 12 March); Enrique Meza (from 12 March)
- Stadium: Estadio Azul
- Primera División: Apertura: 6th (Quarter-finals); Clausura: 11th (Repechage)
- Copa Libertadores: Quarter-finals
- Copa Pachuca: Winners
- Top goalscorer: League: Sebastián Abreu (16); All: Sebastián Abreu (25)
- Biggest win: Cruz Azul 5–1 Veracruz (5 October 2002)
- Biggest defeat: Fénix 6–1 Cruz Azul (5 March 2003)
Home colours	Away colours

The 2002–03 season was Deportivo Cruz Azul's 76th season in existence and their 38th consecutive season in the top flight of Mexican football. The club participated in the Apertura and Clausura tournaments of the Mexican Primera División and in the 2003 Copa Libertadores.

Cruz Azul started the season under José Luis Trejo as manager, but he was sacked at the end of the Apertura tournament; club chairman Guillermo Álvarez cited the "lack of adequate results" as the main reason for firing Trejo. Mario Carrillo was chosen as Trejo's replacement. Trejo had managed to lead Cruz Azul into the playoffs, but were eliminated in quarterfinals by UNAM.

On 12 March 2003, in an unusual situation, chairman Guillermo Álvarez fired Mario Carrillo and the whole squad due to the bad results. Cruz Azul had not won a single match in the first nine rounds and had managed to get only six points; besides, the team had recently suffered a disgraceful 6–1 loss against Uruguayan club Fénix in the Copa Libertadores. After Álvarez terminated the entire first team squad contracts, the players were allowed to return but were given a new contract only for the remaining ten games; this new contract was subject to the team's results during the rest of the season. That same day, Enrique Meza was appointed manager of Cruz Azul.

Despite the mediocre season, Meza managed to lead the team into repechage, a playoff between Guadalajara and Cruz Azul; the winner would qualify to the championship playoffs. Despite winning the first leg 4–1, Cruz Azul lost 1–4 on the second leg and due to Guadalajara finishing ahead of Cruz Azul on the regular phase of the tournament, Cruz Azul was not able to enter the playoffs.

Internationally, Cruz Azul beat the Copa Pre Libertadores and qualified to the 2003 Copa Libertadores group stage. Despite losing on its inaugural match against Corinthians 0–1 and the 1–6 loss against Fénix, Cruz Azul advanced to the knockout stage as second best team in the group.

== Players ==
=== Apertura ===
No.	Pos.	Nat.	Name	Date of birth (age)	Since
1	GK	(Mexico)	Óscar Pérez	1 February 1973 (aged 29)	1993
2	DF	(Mexico)	Melvin Brown	28 January 1979 (aged 23)	1998
3	DF	(Mexico)	Norberto Ángeles	6 June 1977 (aged 25)	2000
4	MF	(Argentina)	Cristian Leiva	26 September 1977 (aged 24)	2002
5	DF	(Mexico)	Víctor Gutiérrez	27 January 1978 (aged 24)	1999
6	MF	(Mexico)	José Alberto Hernández	6 January 1977 (aged 25)	1999
7	DF	(Mexico)	Sergio Almaguer	16 May 1969 (aged 33)	2001
8	MF	(Mexico)	Tomás Campos	14 September 1975 (aged 26)	2000
10	MF	(Argentina)	Mariano Messera	23 February 1978 (aged 24)	2002
11	MF	(Mexico)	Julio César Pinheiro	22 August 1976 (aged 25)	2000
12	GK	(Mexico)	Emmanuel González	25 December 1972 (aged 29)	2002
13	FW	(Uruguay)	Sebastián Abreu	17 October 1976 (aged 25)	2002
14	MF	(Mexico)	Marvin Cabrera	1 May 1980 (aged 22)	2000
15	FW	(Mexico)	Francisco Palencia (Captain)	28 April 1973 (aged 29)	2002
16	MF	(Mexico)	Miguel Gómez Palapa	6 September 1974 (aged 27)	2000
17	MF	(Mexico)	Alejandro Corona	26 June 1976 (aged 26)	2000
18	MF	(Mexico)	Miguel Zepeda	25 May 1976 (aged 26)	2001
19	MF	(Mexico)	Marinho Ledesma	23 April 1977 (aged 25)	2000
20	MF	(Mexico)	Flavio Davino	15 August 1974 (aged 27)	2002
21	FW	(Mexico)	Juan Carlos Cacho	3 May 1982 (aged 20)	2001
26	FW	(Mexico)	Mario Ortiz	4 June 1983 (aged 19)	2000
29	DF	(Mexico)	Aarón Galindo	8 May 1982 (aged 20)	2002
31	DF	(Mexico)	Ricardo Osorio	30 March 1980 (aged 22)	2001
35	DF	(Mexico)	Pablo Campos	23 April 1980 (aged 22)	2002
45	MF	(Mexico)	Gerardo Blanco	6 June 1979 (aged 23)	2002

=== Clausura ===
No.	Pos.	Nat.	Name	Date of birth (age)	Since
1	GK	(Mexico)	Óscar Pérez	1 February 1973 (aged 29)	1993
2	DF	(Mexico)	Melvin Brown	28 January 1989 (aged 13)	1998
3	DF	(Mexico)	Norberto Ángeles	6 June 1977 (aged 25)	2000
4	DF	(Mexico)	Gilberto Jiménez	4 February 1973 (aged 29)	2003
5	DF	(Mexico)	Víctor Gutiérrez	27 January 1978 (aged 24)	1999
6	MF	(Mexico)	José Alberto Hernández	6 January 1977 (aged 26)	1999
7	DF	(Mexico)	Sergio Almaguer	16 May 1969 (aged 33)	2001
8	MF	(Mexico)	Tomás Campos	14 September 1975 (aged 27)	2000
9	FW	(Uruguay)	Daniel Baldi	23 November 1981 (aged 21)	2003
11	MF	(Mexico)	Julio César Pinheiro	22 August 1976 (aged 26)	2000
12	GK	(Mexico)	Emmanuel González	25 December 1972 (aged 30)	2002
13	FW	(Uruguay)	Sebastián Abreu	17 October 1976 (aged 26)	2002
14	MF	(Mexico)	Marvin Cabrera	1 May 1980 (aged 22)	2000
15	FW	(Mexico)	Francisco Palencia (Captain)	28 April 1973 (aged 29)	2002
16	MF	(Mexico)	Miguel Gómez Palapa	6 September 1974 (aged 28)	2000
17	MF	(Mexico)	Alejandro Corona	26 June 1976 (aged 26)	2000
18	MF	(Mexico)	Miguel Zepeda	25 May 1976 (aged 26)	2001
19	MF	(Mexico)	Marinho Ledesma	23 April 1977 (aged 25)	2000
20	MF	(Mexico)	Flavio Davino	15 August 1974 (aged 28)	2002
21	FW	(Mexico)	Juan Carlos Cacho	3 May 1982 (aged 20)	2001
22	MF	(Chile)	Pablo Galdames	26 June 1974 (aged 28)	2003
26	FW	(Mexico)	Mario Ortiz	4 June 1983 (aged 19)	2000
28	MF	(Mexico)	Alan Guadarrama	22 September 1975 (aged 27)	2002
29	DF	(Mexico)	Aarón Galindo	8 May 1982 (aged 20)	2002
30	DF	(Mexico)	Adrián Cortés	19 November 1983 (aged 19)	2003
31	DF	(Mexico)	Ricardo Osorio	30 March 1980 (aged 22)	2001
35	DF	(Mexico)	Pablo Campos	23 April 1980 (aged 22)	2002
45	MF	(Mexico)	Gerardo Blanco	6 June 1979 (aged 23)	2002

== Transfers ==
=== In ===
No.	Pos.	Nat.	Player	Moving from	Type	Transfer window	Ref.
12	GK	(Mexico)	Emmanuel González	Celaya	Transfer	Summer	
15	FW	(Mexico)	Francisco Palencia	(Spain) Espanyol	Loan return	Summer	
20	MF	(Mexico)	Flavio Davino	Morelia	Transfer	Summer	
29	DF	(Mexico)	Aarón Galindo	Academy	Promotion	Summer	
4	DF	(Mexico)	Gilberto Jiménez	Puebla	Loan	Winter	
9	FW	(Uruguay)	Daniel Baldi	(Uruguay) Plaza Colonia	Loan	Winter	
22	MF	(Chile)	Pablo Galdames	Veracruz	Loan return	Winter	
30	DF	(Mexico)	Adrián Cortés	Academy	Promotion	Winter	
7	MF	(Colombia)	Andrés Chitiva^{[A]}	Pachuca	Loan	Special	

=== Out ===
No.	Pos.	Nat.	Player	Moving to	Type	Transfer window	Ref.
–	MF	(Mexico)	Cesáreo Victorino	Pachuca	Loan	Summer	
4	MF	(Argentina)	Cristian Leiva	(Argentina) Gimnasia y Esgrima	Transfer	Winter	
10	MF	(Argentina)	Mariano Messera	(Argentina) Rosario Central	Transfer	Winter	

== Competitions ==
=== Overview ===
Competition	First match	Last match	Starting round	Final position	Record							
Competition	First match	Last match	Starting round	Final position	Pld	W	D	L	GF	GA	GD	Win %
Apertura	3 August 2002	8 December 2002	Matchday 1	Quarterfinals (6th)	21	7	8	6	32	29	+3	33.33
Clausura	12 January 2003	25 May 2003	Matchday 1	11th	21	6	9	6	29	29	+0	28.57
Copa Libertadores	29 October 2002	28 May 2003	Pre Libertadores	Quarterfinals	16	6	5	5	25	21	+4	37.50
Copa Pachuca	26 July 2002	28 July 2002	Semifinals	Winners	2	1	1	0	2	1	+1	50.00
Total					60	20	23	17	88	80	+8	33.33

Source: Mediotiempo.com

=== Torneo Apertura ===
League table

Pos	Team	Pld	W	D	L	GF	GA	GD	Pts	Qualification
4	Morelia	19	9	5	5	35	23	+12	32	Directly qualified to the Liguilla (Playoffs)
5	UAG	19	8	5	6	26	29	−3	29	Directly qualified to the Liguilla (Playoffs)
6	Cruz Azul	19	7	7	5	30	26	+4	28	Directly qualified to the Liguilla (Playoffs)
7	Guadalajara	19	6	9	4	28	29	−1	27	Directly qualified to the Liguilla (Playoffs)
8	Santos Laguna	19	7	5	7	30	28	+2	26	Directly qualified to the Liguilla (Playoffs)

Source: MedioTiempo

Matches

3 August 2002 1	Cruz Azul	1–2	UAG	Benito Juárez, Mexico City
16:05	Abreu 68'	Report	Santillana 36'; Azconzábal 89'	Stadium: Estadio Azul; Referee: Gilberto Alcalá

15 August 2002 2	UANL	0–1	Cruz Azul	San Nicolás de los Garza, Nuevo León
21:00		Report	Gutiérrez 43'	Stadium: Estadio Universitario; Referee: Antonio Marrufo

25 August 2002 4	Guadalajara	1–1	Cruz Azul	Guadalajara, Jalisco
12:00	Sánchez 88'	Report	Abreu 10'	Stadium: Estadio Jalisco; Referee: José de Jesús Robles

31 August 2002 5	Cruz Azul	0–1	San Luis	Benito Juárez, Mexico City
17:00		Report	Milián 72'	Stadium: Estadio Azul; Referee: Armando Archundia

8 September 2002 6	Santos Laguna	1–3	Cruz Azul	Torreón, Coahuila
16:00	Caniza 70'	Report	Pinheiro 35'; Abreu 78', 90'	Stadium: Estadio Corona; Referee: José de Jesús Robles

12 September 2002 7	Cruz Azul	2–1	Necaxa	Benito Juárez, Mexico City
20:00	Palencia 48'; Abreu 74'	Report	Sosa 86'	Stadium: Estadio Azul; Referee: José Abramo Lira

15 September 2002 8	Atlante	2–0	Cruz Azul	Ciudad Nezahualcóyotl, State of Mexico
12:00	Rergis 8'; González 35'	Report		Stadium: Estadio Neza 86; Referee: Felipe Ramos Rizo

21 September 2002 9	Cruz Azul	1–3	Morelia	Benito Juárez, Mexico City
17:00	Zepeda 8'	Report	Alex Fernandes 18', 50'; Saavedra 88'	Stadium: Estadio Azul; Referee: Hugo León Guajardo

29 September 2002 10	UNAM	2–2	Cruz Azul	Coyoacán, Mexico City
12:00	Trujillo 60', 65' (pen.)	Report	Cabrera 33'; Cacho 45'	Stadium: Estadio Olímpico Universitario; Referee: Armando Archundia

5 October 2002 11	Cruz Azul	5–1	Veracruz	Benito Juárez, Mexico City
17:00	Pinheiro 10', 38'; Cacho 26'; Zepeda 58', 82'	Report	Morales 62'	Stadium: Estadio Azul; Referee: Marco Antonio Rodríguez

12 October 2002 12	Monterrey	1–1	Cruz Azul	Monterrey, Nuevo León
17:00	de Nigris 7'	Report	Cacho 1'	Stadium: Estadio Tecnológico; Referee: Gilberto Alcalá

16 October 2002 13	Cruz Azul	1–1	Toluca	Benito Juárez, Mexico City
17:00	Abreu 33'	Report	Cardozo 79'	Stadium: Estadio Azul; Referee: Jorge Eduardo Gasso

19 October 2002 14	Atlas	3–2	Cruz Azul	Guadalajara, Jalisco
20:45	Blanco 16'; Caballero 58'; Morales 61'	Report	Zepeda 10'; Cacho 25'	Stadium: Estadio Jalisco; Referee: Felipe Ramos Rizo

23 October 2002 3	Cruz Azul	3–2	Pachuca	Benito Juárez, Mexico City
17:00	Zepeda 36'; Cacho 46'; Brown 58'	Report	Arango 23'; Gabriel de Anda 47'	Stadium: Estadio Azul; Referee: José de Jesús Robles

26 October 2002 15	Cruz Azul	1–1	Querétaro	Benito Juárez, Mexico City
15:00	Capria 86' (o.g.)	Report	González 35'	Stadium: Estadio Azul; Referee: Germán Arredondo

3 November 2002 16	Puebla	1–2	Cruz Azul	Puebla City, Puebla
14:00	Velázquez 46'	Report	Cacho 32'; Messera 43'	Stadium: Estadio Cuauhtémoc; Referee: Sergio Silva

9 November 2002 17	Cruz Azul	1–1	América	Benito Juárez, Mexico City
17:00	Palencia 47'	Report	Blanco 68'	Stadium: Estadio Azul; Referee: José de Jesús Robles

17 November 2002 18	Chiapas	1–2	Cruz Azul	Tuxtla Gutiérrez, Chiapas
12:00	Glaría 2'	Report	Abreu 44'; Hernández 77'	Stadium: Estadio Víctor Manuel Reyna; Referee: Paul Delgadillo

24 November 2002 19	Cruz Azul	1–1	Celaya	Jasso, Hidalgo
16:00	Palencia 70'	Report	Latorre 20'	Stadium: Estadio 10 de Diciembre; Referee: Antonio Marrufo

Playoffs: Quarterfinals

4 December 2002 First leg	Cruz Azul	0–0	UNAM	Benito Juárez, Mexico City
18:00		Report		Stadium: Estadio Azul; Referee: Eduardo Brizio

8 December 2002 Second leg	UNAM	3–2 (3–2 agg.)	Cruz Azul	Coyoacán, Mexico City
12:00	A. González 15', 42'; Brown 80' (o.g.)	Report	Abreu 51'; Cabrera 84'	Stadium: Estadio Olímpico Universitario; Referee: Felipe Ramos Rizo

=== Torneo Clausura ===
League table

Pos	Team	Pld	W	D	L	GF	GA	GD	Pts	Qualification
9	Santos Laguna	19	9	3	7	30	24	+6	30	
10	América	19	8	5	6	29	20	+9	29	
11	Cruz Azul	19	5	9	5	24	24	0	24	Qualified for the Repechage
12	Necaxa	19	6	5	8	25	24	+1	23	
13	Cuernavaca	19	6	5	8	24	27	−3	23	

Source: MedioTiempo

Matches

12 January 2003 1	UAG	0–0	Cruz Azul	Zapopan, Jalisco
16:00		Report		Stadium: Estadio Tres de Marzo; Referee: Hugo León Guajardo

18 January 2003 2	Cruz Azul	1–3	UANL	Benito Juárez, Mexico City
17:00	Abreu 64'	Report	Gaitán 29'; Montano 34'; Galdames 87' (o.g.)	Stadium: Estadio Azul; Referee: Armando Archundia

26 January 2003 3	Pachuca	0–0	Cruz Azul	Pachuca, Hidalgo
12:00		Report		Stadium: Estadio Hidalgo; Referee: Marco Antonio Rodríguez

1 February 2003 4	Cruz Azul	3–3	Guadalajara	Benito Juárez, Mexico City
17:00	Abreu 10', 32', 52'	Report	Mora 37'; Bravo 44', 79'	Stadium: Estadio Azul; Referee: Felipe Ramos Rizo

9 February 2003 5	San Luis	2–2	Cruz Azul	Pachuca, Hidalgo
19:00	García 23'; Olvera 74'	Report	Cacho 35'; Abreu 81' (pen.)	Stadium: Estadio Hidalgo; Referee: Marco Antonio Cuevas

15 February 2003 6	Cruz Azul	2–2	Santos Laguna	Benito Juárez, Mexico City
17:00	Abreu 3', 78'	Report	Borgetti 24', 75'	Stadium: Estadio Azul; Referee: Sergio Silva

23 February 2003 7	Necaxa	4–0	Cruz Azul	Tlalpan, Mexico City
16:00	Luna 24', 62'; Aguinaga 33'; González 39'	Report		Stadium: Estadio Azteca; Referee: José Gabriel Romero

1 March 2003 8	Cruz Azul	1–3	Atlante	Benito Juárez, Mexico City
17:00	Abreu 12'	Report	González 54'; Ángeles 63' (o.g.); Ramírez 81'	Stadium: Estadio Azul; Referee: Mauricio Morales

8 March 2003 9	Morelia	1–1	Cruz Azul	Morelia, Michoacán
17:00	Navia 19'	Report	Almaguer 89'	Stadium: Estadio Morelos; Referee: Gilberto Alcalá

16 March 2003 10	Cruz Azul	2–0	UNAM	Benito Juárez, Mexico City
12:00	Cacho 18', 57'	Report		Stadium: Estadio Azul; Referee: Hugo León Guajardo

22 March 2003 11	Veracruz	2–0	Cruz Azul	Boca del Río, Veracruz
15:00	Morales 17'; Flores 80'	Report		Stadium: Estadio Luis "Pirata" Fuente; Referee: Marco Antonio Rodríguez

29 March 2003 12	Cruz Azul	0–0	Monterrey	Benito Juárez, Mexico City
17:00		Report		Stadium: Estadio Azul; Referee: Manuel Glower

6 April 2003 13	Toluca	1–3	Cruz Azul	Toluca, State of Mexico
12:00	Cardozo 57'	Report	Corona 62'; Cacho 79', 88'	Stadium: Estadio Nemesio Díez; Referee: Gilberto Alcalá

12 April 2003 14	Cruz Azul	1–1	Atlas	Benito Juárez, Mexico City
17:00	Cacho 7'	Report	Calderón 42'	Stadium: Estadio Azul; Referee: José Abramo Lira

20 April 2003 15	Querétaro	0–1	Cruz Azul	Querétaro City, Querétaro
12:00		Report	Ortiz 82'	Stadium: Estadio Corregidora; Referee: Francisco Javier Caspeta

26 April 2003 16	Cruz Azul	4–0	Puebla	Benito Juárez, Mexico City
17:00	Cacho 4', 84'; Davino 26'; Zepeda 43'	Report		Stadium: Estadio Azul; Referee: Gilberto Alcalá

4 May 2003 17	América	1–3	Cruz Azul	Tlalpan, Mexico City
16:00	Lipatín 79'	Report	Palencia 44', 70'; Cacho 71'	Stadium: Estadio Azteca; Referee: Marco Antonio Rodríguez

10 May 2003 18	Cruz Azul	0–1	Chiapas	Benito Juárez, Mexico City
17:00		Report	Filomeno 25'	Stadium: Estadio Azul; Referee: Felipe Ramos Rizo

17 May 2003 19	Cuernavaca	0–0	Cruz Azul	Xochitepec, Morelos
17:00		Report		Stadium: Estadio Mariano Matamoros; Referee: José Abramo Lira

Repechage

22 May 2003 First leg	Cruz Azul	4–1	Guadalajara	Benito Juárez, Mexico City
20:00	Cacho 7', 85'; Corona 9'; Palencia 37'	Report	Bravo 26'	Stadium: Estadio Azul; Referee: Marco Antonio Rodríguez

25 May 2003 Second leg	Guadalajara	4–1 (5–5 ^{[B]} agg.)	Cruz Azul	Guadalajara, Jalisco
12:00	Sánchez 13'; Bravo 39'; Jo. García 44'; Ja. García 60'	Report	Palencia 39'	Stadium: Estadio Jalisco; Referee: José Abramo Lira

=== Selectivo Pre Pre Libertadores ===
The Selectivo Pre Pre Libertadores 2002 is the last edition of the tournament which distributes the two tickets to the Mexican teams for the 2003 Copa Libertadores. The tournament was won by Club Universidad Nacional by obtaining the first place of group with 6 points and thus obtained the place of Mexico 1, while cruz Azul achieved second place with 6 points by goal difference with which they managed to qualify as Mexico 2 to the Pre-Libertadores 2003 against Venezuelan clubs for two places to the Copa Libertadores 2003.

Group A

Position	Teams	Games	Won	Draw	Lost	Goals scored	Goals conceded	Goal difference	Points
1	UNAM	2	1	0	1	3	3	0	3
2	Cruz Azul	2	1	0	1	3	2	1	3
3	Morelia	2	1	0	1	1	2	-1	3

More info on the games is here:Games

Second round

Position	Teams	Games	Won	Draw	Lost	Goals scored	Goals conceded	Goal difference	Points
1	UNAM	2	2	0	0	8	6	2	6
2	Cruz Azul	2	2	0	0	9	4	5	6
3	Toluca	2	0	0	2	5	9	-4	0
4	Pachuca	2	0	0	2	5	8	-3	0

More info on the games is here:Games

=== Pre-Libertadores Tournament ===
From 1998 to 2002, Mexican and Venezuelan clubs played a mini tournament known as Copa Pre Libertadores to determine two teams that would qualify to the next year's Copa Libertadores group stage. In 2002 UNAM participated in the Pre Libertadores trying to earn a spot in the 2003 edition of the tournament.

Pos	Team	Pld	W	D	L	GF	GA	GD	Pts	Qualification
1	(Mexico) UNAM	6	4	1	1	12	4	+8	13	Advance to group stage
2	(Mexico) Cruz Azul	6	3	2	1	11	7	+4	11	Advance to group stage
3	(Venezuela) Estudiantes de Mérida	6	2	1	3	7	9	−2	7	
4	(Venezuela) Nacional Táchira	6	1	0	5	6	16	−10	3	

Source: CONMEBOL

29 October 2002 1	Estudiantes de Mérida (Venezuela)	1–1	(Mexico) Cruz Azul	Mérida, Venezuela
16:00	Vielma 69'	Report	Zepeda 36'	Stadium: Estadio Guillermo Soto Rosa; Referee: Mauricio Reinoso (Ecuador)

31 October 2002 2	Nacional Táchira (Venezuela)	2–3	(Mexico) Cruz Azul	Mérida, Venezuela
16:00	Clóvis Bento 42'; Giovanni Daniel 90+2'	Report	Pinheiro 55'; Messera 69'; Cacho 79'	Stadium: Estadio Guillermo Soto Rosa; Referee: Pedro Ramos (Ecuador)

6 November 2002 3	UNAM (Mexico)	1–1	(Mexico) Cruz Azul	Mexico City, Mexico
	P. Campos 43' (o.g.)	Report	Ledesma 40'	Stadium: Estadio Olímpico Universitario; Referee: Gilberto Alcalá (Mexico)

14 November 2002 4	Cruz Azul (Mexico)	2–1	(Venezuela) Estudiantes de Mérida	Mexico City, Mexico
16:00	Abreu 44'; Pinheiro 77'	Report	Panigutti 26'	Stadium: Estadio Azul; Referee: Felipe Russi (Colombia)

21 November 2002 5	Cruz Azul (Mexico)	4–0	(Venezuela) Nacional Táchira	Mexico City, Mexico
16:00	Abreu 9', 21', 22'; Gutiérrez 62'	Report		Stadium: Estadio Azul; Referee: Carlos Chandía (Chile)

28 November 2002 6	Cruz Azul (Mexico)	0–2	(Mexico) UNAM	Mexico City, Mexico
		Report	Fonseca 51'; España 90+2'	Stadium: Estadio Azul; Referee: Felipe Ramos Rizo (Mexico)

=== Copa Libertadores ===
Group stage

Pos	Team	Pld	W	D	L	GF	GA	GD	Pts
1	(Brazil) Corinthians	6	5	0	1	15	6	+9	15
2	(Mexico) Cruz Azul	6	3	0	3	12	11	+1	9
3	(Uruguay) Fénix	6	2	0	4	10	14	−4	6
4	(Bolivia) The Strongest	6	2	0	4	6	12	−6	6

5 February 2003 1	Corinthians (Brazil)	1–0	(Mexico) Cruz Azul	São Paulo, Brazil
21:40	Liédson 13'	Report		Stadium: Pacaembu Stadium; Referee: Horacio Elizondo (Argentina)

18 February 2003 2	Cruz Azul (Mexico)	3–2	(Bolivia) The Strongest	Mexico City, Mexico
20:30	Abreu 15', 79'; Baldi 75'	Report	Cabrera 40'; Ribera 89'	Stadium: Estadio Azul; Referee: Eduardo Lecca (Peru)

5 March 2003 3	Fénix (Uruguay)	6–1	(Mexico) Cruz Azul	Montevideo, Uruguay
18:05	Ligüera 45', 71' (pen.), 74'; Cámpora 51'; Hornos 78'; Cortés 89'	Report	Abreu 17'	Stadium: Estadio Luis Franzini; Attendance: 5,500; Referee: Gabriel Brazenas (Argentina)

26 March 2003 4	Cruz Azul (Mexico)	3–0	(Brazil) Corinthians	Mexico City, Mexico
18:40	T. Campos 6'; Cacho 45'; Palencia 67'	Report		Stadium: Estadio Azul; Referee: Gilberto Hidalgo (Peru)

3 April 2003 5	The Strongest (Bolivia)	2–1	(Mexico) Cruz Azul	La Paz, Bolivia
17:05	Gigena 34'; Coelho 87' (pen.)	Report	Zepeda 57'	Stadium: Estadio Hernando Siles; Referee: Guido Aros (Chile)

8 April 2003 6	Cruz Azul (Mexico)	4–0	(Uruguay) Fénix	Mexico City, Mexico
21:30	Palencia 4'; Jiménez 43'; Zepeda 58'; Ortiz 84'	Report		Stadium: Estadio Azul; Referee: Daniel Giménez (Argentina)

Round of 16

6 May 2003 First leg	Cruz Azul (Mexico)	0–0	(Colombia) Deportivo Cali	Mexico City, Mexico
20:40		Report		Stadium: Estadio Azul; Referee: Epifanio González (Paraguay)

13 May 2003 Second leg	Deportivo Cali (Colombia)	0–0 (0–0 agg.) (2–3 p)	(Mexico) Cruz Azul	Cali, Colombia
20:40		Report		Stadium: Estadio Olímpico Pascual Guerrero; Referee: Gilberto Hidalgo (Peru)
	Penalties
	G. Hernández (penalty scored); García (penalty scored); Patiño (penalty missed); Murillo (penalty missed); Álvarez (penalty missed)		(penalty scored) Palencia; (penalty missed) Chitiva; (penalty scored) Cacho; (penalty scored) J. Hernández

Quarterfinals

21 May 2003 First leg	Cruz Azul (Mexico)	2–2	(Brazil) Santos	Mexico City, Mexico
19:40	Palencia 18', 50'		Renato 21'; Diego 76'	Stadium: Estadio Azteca; Referee: Óscar Ruiz (Colombia)

28 May 2003 Second leg	Santos (Brazil)	1–0 (3–2 agg.)	(Mexico) Cruz Azul	Santos, Brazil
20:40	Robinho 13'	Report		Stadium: Estádio Urbano Caldeira; Referee: Epifanio González (Paraguay)

=== Copa Pachuca ===
Semi-finals
26 July – Estadio Hidalgo
Cruz Azul	1
UNAM	0
26 July – Estadio Hidalgo
Pachuca	3
Atlético Celaya	1

Final
13 August – Estadio Hidalgo
Pachuca	1 (3)
Cruz Azul	1 (5)
Third place
13 August – Estadio Hidalgo
UNAM	2
Atlético Celaya	0

Source: RSSSF

== Statistics ==
=== Appearances and goals ===
No.	Pos.	Player	Total		Apertura		Clausura		Copa Libertadores (including pre libertadores)		Pre Pre Libertadores	
No.	Pos.	Player	Apps	Goals	Apps	Goals	Apps	Goals	Apps	Goals	Apps	Goals
1	GK	(Mexico) Óscar Pérez	50	0	20	0	19	0	11	0	-	-
2	DF	(Mexico) Melvin Brown	51	1	21	1	16	0	14	0	-	-
3	DF	(Mexico) Norberto Ángeles	29	0	9	0	12	0	8	0	-	-
4	DF	(Mexico) Gilberto Jiménez	25	1	–	–	16	0	9	1	-	-
5	DF	(Mexico) Víctor Gutiérrez	50	2	18	1	18	0	14	1	-	-
6	MF	(Mexico) José Alberto Hernández	40	1	16	1	14	0	10	0	-	-
7	DF	(Mexico) Sergio Almaguer	9	1	1	0	6	1	2	0	-	-
7	MF	(Colombia) Andrés Chitiva^{[A]}	4	0	–	–	–	–	4	0	-	-
8	MF	(Mexico) Tomás Campos	50	1	17	0	18	0	15	1	-	-
9	FW	(Uruguay) Daniel Baldi	8	1	–	–	5	0	3	1	-	-
11	MF	(Mexico) Julio César Pinheiro	29	5	18	3	5	0	6	2	-	-
12	GK	(Mexico) Emmanuel González	9	0	1	0	2	0	6	0	-	-
13	FW	(Uruguay) Sebastián Abreu	32	25	14	8	9	8	5	7	4	2
14	MF	(Mexico) Marvin Cabrera	24	2	5	2	8	0	11	0	-	-
15	FW	(Mexico) Francisco Palencia	47	11	16	3	17	4	14	4	-	-
16	MF	(Mexico) Miguel Gómez Palapa	10	0	0	0	8	0	2	0	-	-
17	MF	(Mexico) Alejandro Corona	20	3	3	0	9	3	8	0	-	-
18	MF	(Mexico) Miguel Zepeda	40	9	17	5	13	1	10	3	-	-
19	MF	(Mexico) Marinho Ledesma	30	1	11	0	16	0	3	1	-	-
20	MF	(Mexico) Flavio Davino	24	1	6	0	9	1	9	0	-	-
21	FW	(Mexico) Juan Carlos Cacho	39	18	15	6	16	10	8	2	-	-
22	MF	(Chile) Pablo Galdames	11	0	–	–	8	0	3	0	-	-
26	FW	(Mexico) Mario Ortiz	20	2	4	0	8	1	8	1	-	-
28	MF	(Mexico) Alan Guadarrama	1	0	–	–	1	0	0	0	-	-
29	DF	(Mexico) Aarón Galindo	37	0	13	0	17	0	7	0	-	-
30	DF	(Mexico) Adrián Cortés	3	0	–	–	3	0	0	0	-	-
31	DF	(Mexico) Ricardo Osorio	46	0	20	0	16	0	10	0	-	-
35	DF	(Mexico) Pablo Campos	6	0	1	0	2	0	3	0	-	-
37	FW	(Mexico) Luis Alberto Orozco	1	0	0	0	1	0	0	0	-	-
45	MF	(Mexico) Gerardo Blanco	6	0	3	0	0	0	3	0	-	-
48	FW	(Mexico) Iván Moreno	1	0	0	0	1	0	0	0	-	-
Players that left the club during the season
4	MF	(Argentina) Cristian Leiva	22	0	18	0	–	–	4	0	-	-
10	MF	(Argentina) Mariano Messera	22	2	16	1	–	–	6	1	-	-

=== Goalscorers ===
Rank	Pos.	Player	Apertura	Clausura	Copa Libertadores (including pre libertadores)	Pre Pre Libertadores	Total
1	FW	(Uruguay) Sebastián Abreu	8	8	7	2	25
2	FW	(Mexico) Juan Carlos Cacho	6	10	2	-	18
3	FW	(Mexico) Francisco Palencia	3	4	4	-	11
4	MF	(Mexico) Miguel Zepeda	5	1	3	-	9
5	MF	(Mexico) Julio César Pinheiro	3	0	2	-	5
6	MF	(Mexico) Alejandro Corona	0	3	0	-	3
7	MF	(Mexico) Marvin Cabrera	2	0	0	-	2
7	DF	(Mexico) Víctor Gutiérrez	1	0	-	-	2
7	MF	(Argentina) Mariano Messera	1	–	-	-	2
7	FW	(Mexico) Mario Ortiz	0	1	-	-	2
11	DF	(Mexico) Sergio Almaguer	0	1	0	-	1
11	FW	(Uruguay) Daniel Baldi	–	0	1	-	1
11	DF	(Mexico) Melvin Brown	1	0	0	-	1
11	MF	(Mexico) Tomás Campos	0	0	1	-	1
11	MF	(Mexico) Flavio Davino	0	1	0	-	1
11	MF	(Mexico) José Alberto Hernández	1	0	0	-	1
11	DF	(Mexico) Gilberto Jiménez	–	0	1	-	1
11	MF	(Mexico) Marinho Ledesma	0	0	1	-	1
Own goals			1	0	0	-	1
Total			32	29	25	2+	88+

=== Hat-tricks ===
Player	Against	Result	Date	Competition	Ref.
(Uruguay) Sebastián Abreu	(Venezuela) Nacional Táchira	4–0 (H)	21 November 2002	Copa Libertadores	
(Uruguay) Sebastián Abreu	Guadalajara	3–3 (H)	1 February 2003	Primera División	

=== Own goals ===
Player	Against	Result	Date	Competition
(Mexico) Pablo Campos	UNAM	1–1 (A)	6 November 2002	Copa Libertadores
(Mexico) Melvin Brown	UNAM	2–3 (A)	8 December 2002	Primera División
(Chile) Pablo Galdames	UANL	1–3 (H)	18 January 2003	Primera División
(Mexico) Norberto Ángeles	Atlante	1–3 (H)	1 March 2003	Primera División

== Notes ==
A. Andrés Chitiva was loaned to Cruz Azul to participate in the knockout stage of the Copa Libertadores.
B. Guadalajara finished the regular phase of the tournament ahead of Cruz Azul; therefore, Guadalajara advances to the playoffs.
