= 2000–01 Club Atlético Boca Juniors season =

Boca Juniors football season

Boca Juniors
2000-01 season
- President: Mauricio Macri
- Manager: Carlos Bianchi
- Stadium: Estadio Camilo Cichero (La Bombonera)
- Apertura Tournament: Winners
- Clausura Tournament: 3rd
- Copa Mercosur: Quarter-finals
- Copa Libertadores: Winners
- Intercontinental Cup: Winners
- Top goalscorer: League: Martin Palermo (11); All: Juan Roman Riquelme (13)
Home colours	Away colours	Third colours

The 2000–01 Club Atlético Boca Juniors season was the 71st consecutive Primera División season played by the senior squad.

== Summary ==
The season is best remembered due to the clinching of 2000 Intercontinental Cup against heavily favourites and 1999-2000 UEFA Champions League Champions Real Madrid thanks to 2 goals of Martin Palermo. In the second half of the season, the club won the 2001 Copa Libertadores for the second consecutive year aimed by the talent of Juan Roman Riquelme and a superb performance in the Finals of Cordoba. As of December 2020, the Back-to-back Boca title was the last time a team could reach that performance in Copa Libertadores. Also, the squad won the Apertura Tournament finishing 4 points ahead of River Plate and Gimnasia La Plata.

== Squad ==
Note: Flags indicate national team as defined under FIFA eligibility rules; some limited exceptions apply. Players may hold more than one non-FIFA nationality.

No.	Pos.	Nation	Player
—	GK	COL	Oscar Cordoba
—	GK	ARG	Roberto Abbondanzieri
—	DF	ARG	Hugo Ibarra
—	DF	COL	Jorge Bermudez
—	DF	ARG	Walter Samuel
—	DF	ARG	Julio Marchant
—	DF	ARG	Cesar Osvaldo La Paglia
—	DF	ARG	José Antonio Pereda
—	DF	ARG	Emanuel Ruiz
—	DF	ARG	Rodolfo Arruabarrena
—	DF	ARG	Anibal Matellan
—	DF	ARG	José María Calvo
—	DF	ARG	Omar Sebastián Pérez

No.	Pos.	Nation	Player
—	DF	ARG	Gustavo Pinto
—	MF	ARG	Diego Cagna
—	MF	ARG	Juan Roman Riquelme
—	MF	ARG	Gustavo Barros Schelotto
—	MF	ARG	Christian Traverso
—	MF	COL	Mauricio Serna
—	MF	ARG	José Horacio Basualdo
—	MF	ARG	Sebastian Battaglia
—	MF	ARG	Nicolas Burdisso
—	FW	ARG	Martin Palermo
—	FW	ARG	Guillermo Barros Schelotto
—	FW	ARG	Marcelo Delgado
—	FW	ARG	Antonio Barijho
—	FW	ARG	Alfredo Moreno
—	FW	ARG	Christian Giménez
—	FW	ARG	Matías Sebastián Arce
—	DF	ARG	Fernando Navas
—	MF	ARG	Facundo Imboden
—	DF	ARG	Elías Bazzi

=== Transfers ===
In
Pos.	Name	From	Type
MF	Daniel Fagiani	Valencia CF	
DF	Hernán Medina		
FW	Fernando Pandolfi		
DF	Julio Alcorsé		
DF	Martin Andrizzi		
DF	Sergio Guillermo		
DF	Carlos Augusto Quiñones		
DF	Clemente Rodriguez		

Out
Pos.	Name	To	Type
FW	Alfredo Moreno		
DF	Walter Samuel	A.S. Roma	
DF	Rodolfo Arruabarrena	Villarreal CF	
MF	Diego Cagna	Villarreal CF	
DF	Cesar Osvaldo La Paglia		
DF	Fernando Navas		
DF	Facundo Imboden		loan
DF	Elías Bazzi		

==== January ====
In
Pos.	Name	From	Type
FW	Walter Gaitán	Villarreal CF	
MF	Facundo Imboden		
MF	Esteban José Herrera		
DF	Joel Barbosa		
DF	Cesar Osvaldo La Paglia		
MF	Javier Alejandro Villarreal		
MF	Roberto Colautti		
DF	Elías Bazzi		
DF	Ariel Carreño		

Out
Pos.	Name	To	Type
FW	Martin Palermo	Villarreal CF	
MF	Gustavo Barros Schelotto	Villarreal CF	
MF	José Horacio Basualdo	CF Extremadura	
DF	Daniel Fagiani	Atlético Madrid	
MF	Hernán Medina	AEK Athens F.C.	

== Competitions ==
=== Torneo Apertura ===
==== League table ====
Pos	Team	Pld	W	D	L	GF	GA	GD	Pts
1	Boca Juniors	19	12	5	2	35	19	+16	41
2	River Plate	19	10	7	2	41	24	+17	37
3	Gimnasia y Esgrima (LP)	19	11	4	4	36	29	+7	37
4	Talleres (C)	19	11	3	5	31	21	+10	36
5	San Lorenzo	19	10	4	5	33	18	+15	34

==== Position by round ====
Round	1	2	3	4	5	6	7	8	9	10	11	12	13	14	15	16	17	18	19
Ground	H	A	H	A	H	A	A	H	A	H	A	H	A	H	A	H	A	H	A
Result	W	D	W	W	W	L	D	L	L	W	W	W	L	W	W	W	L	L	D
Position	1	1	1	1	3	2	2	2	1	1	1	1	1	1	1	1	1	1	1

Source: www.afa.com.ar
A = Away; H = Home; W = Win; D = Draw; L = Loss

=== Torneo Clausura ===
==== League table ====
Pos	Team	Pld	W	D	L	GF	GA	GD	Pts	Qualification
1	San Lorenzo	19	15	2	2	43	17	+26	47	Qualification for Copa Libertadores
2	River Plate	19	13	2	4	48	27	+21	41	
3	Boca Juniors	19	8	6	5	29	26	+3	30	
4	Argentinos Juniors	19	8	5	6	27	22	+5	29	
5	Racing	19	7	8	4	21	20	+1	29	

==== Position by round ====
Round	1	2	3	4	5	6	7	8	9	10	11	12	13	14	15	16	17	18	19
Ground	H	A	H	A	H	A	A	H	A	H	A	H	A	H	A	H	A	H	A
Result	W	D	W	W	W	L	D	L	L	W	W	W	L	W	W	W	L	L	D
Position	7	15	11	10	15	16	18	14	8	5	8	6	3	3	4	4	4	4	3

Source: www.afa.com.ar
A = Away; H = Home; W = Win; D = Draw; L = Loss

=== Copa Mercosur ===
==== Group stage ====
Team	Pts	Pld	W	D	L	GF	GA	GD
(Argentina) Boca Juniors	12	6	3	3	0	15	8	+7
(Uruguay) Nacional	9	6	2	3	1	8	8	+0
(Paraguay) Olimpia	9	6	3	0	3	9	10	-1
(Brazil) Corinthians	2	6	0	2	4	7	13	-6

2 August 2000 1	Olimpia (Paraguay)	0–1	(Argentina) Boca Juniors	Asunción
		Report	Battaglia 86'	Stadium: Defensores del Chaco

9 August 2000 2	Boca Juniors (Argentina)	3–0	(Brazil) Corinthians	Buenos Aires
	Delgado 3'; Barijho 22'; Andrizzi 65'	Report		Stadium: La Bombonera

29 August 2000 3	Boca Juniors (Argentina)	1–1	(Uruguay) Nacional	Buenos Aires
	Palermo 77'	Report	Islas 69'	Stadium: La Bombonera

13 September 2000 4	Boca Juniors (Argentina)	5–2	(Paraguay) Olimpia	Buenos Aires
	Barijho 19'; Pandolfi 32', 60' (pen.), 63'; Gus. Barros Schelotto 48'	Report	González 23'; Esteche 51'	Stadium: La Bombonera

19 September 2000 5	Corinthians (Brazil)	2–2	(Argentina) Boca Juniors	São Paulo
	Ricardinho 77' (pen.), 90+1'	Report	Arce 28'; Pandolfi 59'	Stadium: Pacaembu

18 October 2000 6	Nacional (Uruguay)	3–3	(Argentina) Boca Juniors	Montevideo
	Islas 42' (pen.), 72'; Regueiro 79'	Report	Medina 16'; Barijho 26', 71'	Stadium: Centenario

==== Final stage ====
Quarter-finals

1 November 2000 1st Leg	Atlético Mineiro (Brazil)	2–0	(Argentina) Boca Juniors	Belo Horizonte
	Marques 45'; Capria 81'	Report		Stadium: Mineirão

7 November 2000 2nd Leg	Boca Juniors (Argentina)	2–2 (2–4 agg.)	(Brazil) Atlético Mineiro	Buenos Aires
	Barijho 10', 42'	Report	Caçapa 38'; André 90'	Stadium: La Bombonera

=== Copa Libertadores ===
==== Group stage ====
Pos	Team	Pld	W	D	L	GF	GA	GD	Pts
1	(Argentina) Boca Juniors	6	5	0	1	7	5	+2	15
2	(Chile) Cobreloa	6	3	1	2	8	7	+1	10
3	(Colombia) Deportivo Cali	6	3	0	3	13	8	+5	9
4	(Bolivia) Oriente Petrolero	6	0	1	5	6	14	−8	1

21 February 2001 1	Boca Juniors (Argentina)	2–1	(Bolivia) Oriente Petrolero	Buenos Aires
	Pérez 33'; Riquelme 56'	Report	Coimbra 58'	Stadium: La Bombonera

28 February 2001 2	Cobreloa (Chile)	0–1	(Argentina) Boca Juniors	Calama
		Report	Bermúdez 76'	Stadium: Municipal

7 March 2001 3	Boca Juniors (Argentina)	2–1	(Colombia) Deportivo Cali	Buenos Aires
	Delgado 30', 54'	Report	Quintana 25'	Stadium: La Bombonera

20 March 2001 4	Boca Juniors (Argentina)	1–0	(Chile) Cobreloa	Buenos Aires
	Pinto 12'	Report		Stadium: La Bombonera

4 April 2001 5	Oriente Petrolero (Bolivia)	0–1	(Argentina) Boca Juniors	Santa Cruz
		Report	Pandolfi 90+1'	Stadium: Tahuichi

2 May 2001 6	Deportivo Cali (Colombia)	3–0	(Argentina) Boca Juniors	Cali
	Bedoya 34'; Aristizábal 77'; Marchant 85' (o.g.)	Report		Stadium: Olímpico

==== Eightfinals ====
10 May 2001 R16, 1st Leg	Junior (Colombia)	2–3	(Argentina) Boca Juniors	Barranquilla
	Arriaga 28'; Zambrano 39'	Report	Delgado 6', 81'; Riquelme 64'	Stadium: Metropolitano

16 May 2001 R16, 2nd Leg	Boca Juniors (Argentina)	1–1 (4–3 agg.)	(Colombia) Junior	Buenos Aires
	Gui. Barros Schelotto 9'	Report	Zambrano 1'	Stadium: La Bombonera

==== Quarterfinals ====
23 May 2001 QF, 1st Leg	Vasco da Gama (Brazil)	0–1	(Argentina) Boca Juniors	Rio de Janeiro
		Report	Gui. Barros Schelotto 69'	Stadium: São Januário

30 May 2001 QF, 2nd Leg	Boca Juniors (Argentina)	3–0 (4–0 agg.)	(Brazil) Vasco da Gama	Buenos Aires
	Matellán 11'; Gui. Barros Schelotto 21' (pen.), 31'	Report		Stadium: La Bombonera

==== Semifinals ====
7 June 2001 SF, 1st Leg	Boca Juniors (Argentina)	2–2	(Brazil) Palmeiras	Buenos Aires
	Gui. Barros Schelotto 43' (pen.); Barijho 53'	Report	Alex 18'; Fábio Júnior 52'	Stadium: La Bombonera

13 June 2001 SF, 2nd Leg	Palmeiras (Brazil)	2–2 (4–4 agg.) (2–3 p)	(Argentina) Boca Juniors	São Paulo
	Fábio Júnior 36'; Bermúdez 66' (o.g.)	Report	Gaitán 2'; Riquelme 17'	Stadium: Palestra Itália
	Penalties
	Alex (penalty missed); Lopes (penalty scored); Basílio (penalty missed); Muñoz (penalty scored); Arce (penalty missed)		(penalty scored) Riquelme; (penalty missed) Traverso; (penalty scored) Delgado; (penalty scored) Bermúdez

==== Finals ====
20 June 2001 1	Cruz Azul (Mexico)	0–1	(Argentina) Boca Juniors	Mexico City
19:40 (UTC-5)		Report	Delgado 85'	Stadium: Estadio Azteca; Attendance: 115,000; Referee: (Brazil) Márcio Rezende

28 June 2001 2	Boca Juniors (Argentina)	0–1 (1–1 agg.) (3–1 p)	(Mexico) Cruz Azul	La Boca
21:30 (UTC-3)		Report	Palencia 42'	Stadium: La Bombonera, Referee: (Peru) Gilberto Hidalgo
	Penalties
	Riquelme (penalty scored); Serna (penalty scored); Delgado (penalty scored); Bermúdez (penalty missed)		(penalty scored) Palencia; (penalty missed) Galdames; (penalty missed) Hernández; (penalty missed) Pinheiro

=== Intercontinental Cup ===
28 November 2000	Real Madrid (Spain)	1–2	(Argentina) Boca Juniors	Tokyo
19:10 JST	Roberto Carlos 12'	Report	Palermo 3', 6'	Stadium: National Stadium; Attendance: 52,511; Referee: (Colombia) Óscar Ruiz

== Statistics ==
=== Players statistics ===
No.	Pos	Nat	Player	Total		Apertura 2000		Clausura 2001		Libertadores	
No.	Pos	Nat	Player	Apps	Goals	Apps	Goals	Apps	Goals	Apps	Goals
	GK	(Colombia) COL	Oscar Cordoba	34	0	18	0	3	0	13	0
	DF	(Argentina) ARG	Hugo Ibarra	41	2	19	1	10	1	12	0
	DF	(Colombia) COL	Jorge Bermudez	39	5	16	2	10	2	13	1
	DF	(Argentina) ARG	Nicolas Burdisso	27	2	4	0	13	2	10	0
	DF	(Argentina) ARG	Clemente Rodriguez	24	1	1	0	13	1	10	0
	MF	(Argentina) ARG	Anibal Matellan	40	1	17	0	11	0	12	1
	MF	(Colombia) COL	Mauricio Serna	32	1	12	1	9	0	11	0
	MF	(Argentina) ARG	Christian Traverso	27	0	9	0	8	0	10	0
	MF	(Argentina) ARG	Juan Roman Riquelme	39	13	16	5	11	5	12	3
	FW	(Argentina) ARG	Guillermo Barros Schelotto	26	11	6	1	11	5	9	5
	FW	(Argentina) ARG	Marcelo Delgado	36	12	14	6	10	1	12	5
	GK	(Argentina) ARG	Roberto Abbondanzieri	18	0	1	0	15	0	2	0
	MF	(Argentina) ARG	Sebastian Battaglia	21	0	16	0	3	0	2	0
	DF	(Argentina) ARG	Julio Marchant	26	0	11	0	11	0	4	0
	FW	(Argentina) ARG	Antonio Barijho	26	8	11	4	12	3	3	1
	DF	(Argentina) ARG	José Antonio Pereda	18	0	5	0	8	0	5	0
	FW	(Argentina) ARG	Christian Giménez	13	1	1	1	6	0	6	0
	DF	(Argentina) ARG	Omar Sebastián Pérez	24	4	1	0	16	3	7	1
	DF	(Argentina) ARG	Gustavo Pinto	20	1	1	0	10	0	9	1
	MF	(Argentina) ARG	Fernando Pandolfi	17	1	4	0	7	0	6	1
	FW	(Argentina) ARG	Walter Gaitán	20	5	0	0	10	4	10	1
	DF	(Argentina) ARG	Javier Alejandro Villarreal	12	0	0	0	5	0	7	0
	GK	(Argentina) ARG	Christian Muñoz	1	0	0	0	1	0	0	0
	DF	(Argentina) ARG	Emanuel Ruiz	11	0	7	0	4	0		
	FW	(Argentina) ARG	Matías Sebastián Arce	7	1	2	1	5	0		
	DF	(Argentina) ARG	José María Calvo	8	0	1	0	7	0		
	MF	(Argentina) ARG	Facundo Imboden	8	0	0	0	8	0		
	DF	(Argentina) ARG	Esteban José Herrera	7	1	0	0	7	1		
	MF	(Argentina) ARG	Joel Enrique Barbosa	7	0	0	0	7	0		
	DF	(Argentina) ARG	Cesar Osvaldo La Paglia	6	1	0	0	6	1		
	MF	(Argentina) ARG	Roberto Colautti	3	0	0	0	3	0		
	DF	(Argentina) ARG	Elías Bazzi	1	0	0	0	1	0		
	DF	(Argentina) ARG	Ariel Carreño	1	0	0	0	1	0		
	MF	(Argentina) ARG	Gustavo Barros Schelotto	13	2	13	2				
	FW	(Argentina) ARG	Martin Palermo	18	11	18	11				
	MF	(Argentina) ARG	José Horacio Basualdo	8	0	8	0				
	DF	(Argentina) ARG	Daniel Fagiani	17	0	17	0				
	MF	(Argentina) ARG	Hernán Medina	7	0	7	0				
	DF	(Argentina) ARG	Julio Alcorsé	1	0	1	0				
	DF	(Argentina) ARG	Martin Andrizzi	1	0	1	0				
	MF	(Argentina) ARG	Sergio Adrian Guillermo	1	0	1	0				
	DF	(Argentina) ARG	Carlos Augusto Quiñonez	1	0	1	0				
