= 2001 Copa Libertadores finals =

- Event: Copa Libertadores 2001
| Cruz Azul | Boca Juniors |
| (Mexico) | (Argentina) |
| 1 | 1 |
- on aggregate Boca Juniors won 3–1 on penalties

First leg
| Cruz Azul | Boca Juniors |
| 0 | 1 |
- Date: 20 June 2001
- Venue: Estadio Azteca, Mexico City
- Man of the Match: Juan Román Riquelme
- Referee: Márcio Rezende

Second leg
| Boca Juniors | Cruz Azul |
| 0 | 1 |
- Date: 28 June 2001
- Venue: La Bombonera, Buenos Aires
- Referee: Gilberto Hidalgo

The 2001 Copa Libertadores final was a two-legged football match-up to determine the 2001 Copa Libertadores champion. It was contested by Argentine club Boca Juniors and Mexican club Cruz Azul. The first leg of the tie was played on 20 June at Estadio Azteca in Mexico City while the second leg was held in Boca Juniors' venue, La Bombonera, on 28 June.

The competition was won by defending champions Boca Juniors, who beat Cruz Azul 3–1 on penalties after a 1–1 draw on aggregate. It became Boca Juniors' fourth Copa Libertadores title.

== Qualified teams ==
| Team | Previous finals app. |
|---|---|
| (Argentina) Boca Juniors | 1963, **1977**, **1978**, 1979, **2000** |
| (Mexico) Cruz Azul | None |

Bold indicates winning years

== Venues ==
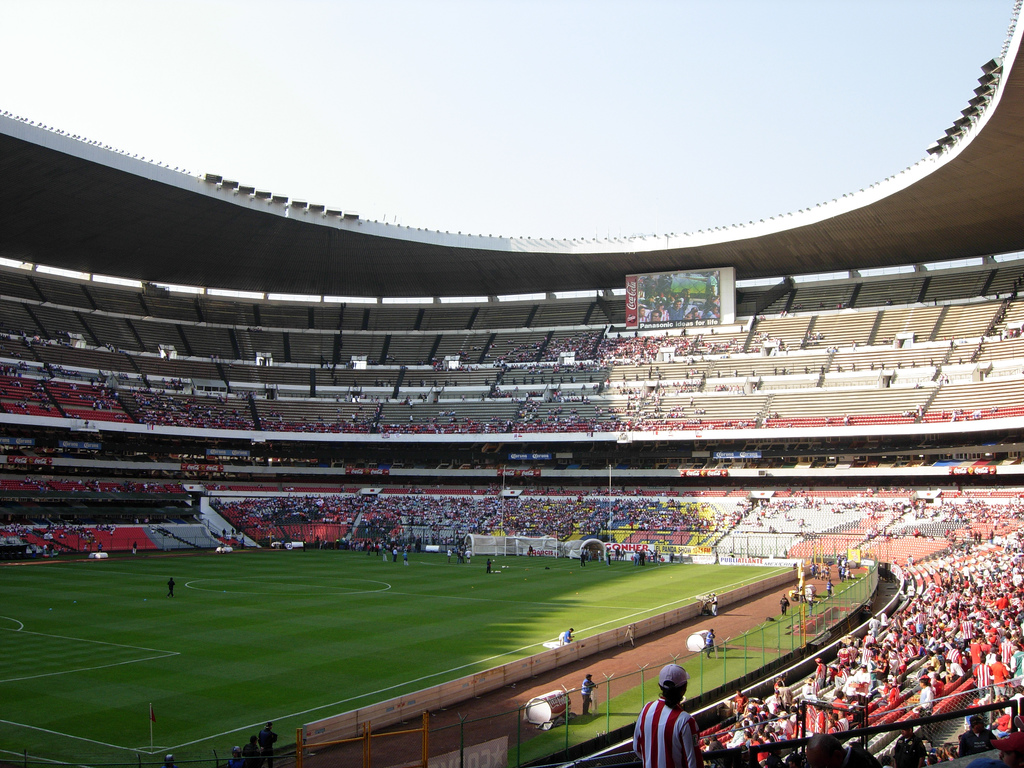
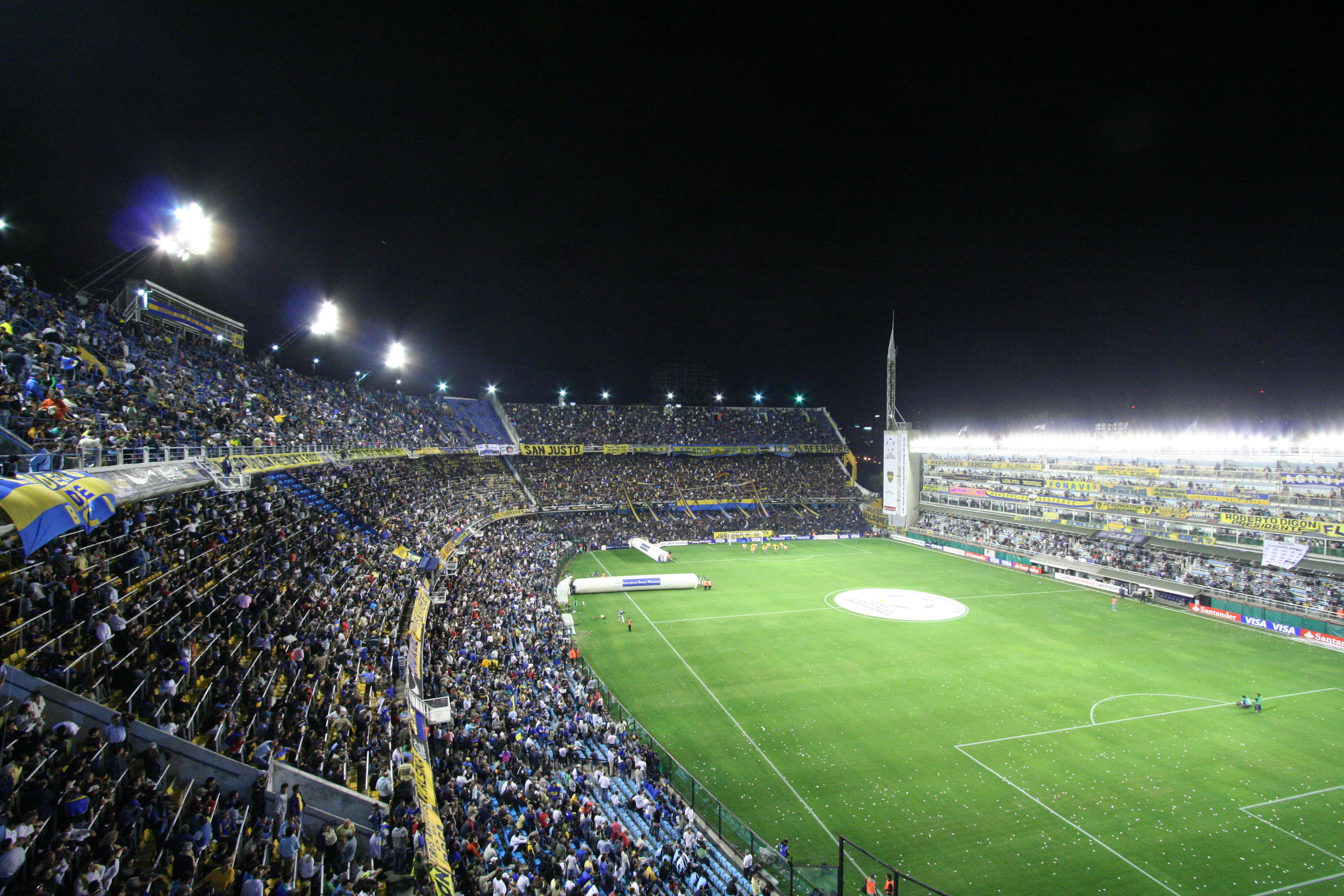
Estadio Azteca (Mexico City) and La Bombonera (Buenos Aires), venues for the finals

== Route to the finals ==
| Boca Juniors | | | Cruz Azul | |
|---|---|---|---|---|
| (Colombia) Junior; A **3–2** | Delgado 6', 80'; Riquelme 65' | **Round of 16**; First leg | (Paraguay) Cerro Porteño; A **1–2** | Almaguer 10' |
| (Colombia) Junior; H **1–1** | Schelotto 9' | Second leg | (Paraguay) Cerro Porteño; H **3–1** | Cardozo 5', 32'; Morales 29' |
| (Brazil) Vasco da Gama; A **1–0** | Schelotto 69' | **Quarterfinals**; First leg | (Argentina) River Plate; A **0–0** | |
| (Brazil) Vasco da Gama; H **3–0** | Matellán 11'; Schelotto 21', 31' | Second leg | (Argentina) River Plate; H **3–0** | Palencia 19', 25'; Cardozo 43' |
| (Brazil) Palmeiras; H **2–2** | Schelotto 43'; Barijho 54' (pen.) | **Semifinals**; First leg | (Argentina) Rosario Central; A **2–0** | Cardozo 36'; Palencia 75' (pen.) |
| (Brazil) Palmeiras; A **2–2** (p. 3–2) | Gaitán 2'; Riquelme 17' | Second leg | (Argentina) Rosario Central; H **3–3** | Almaguer 8'; Adomaitis 44'; Palencia 89' |

== Final summary ==
=== First leg ===
2001 Copa Libertadores finals
June 20, 2001
19:40 (UTC-5)
First leg

| Cruz Azul (Mexico) | 0–1 | (Argentina) Boca Juniors |
|---|---|---|
| | Report | Delgado 85' |

Estadio Azteca, Mexico City
Attendance: 115,000
Referee: Márcio Rezende (Brazil)

| **Cruz Azul** | **Boca Juniors** |

| GK | 1 | (Mexico) Oscar Pérez |
| DF | 3 | (Mexico) Norberto Ángeles | | (substituted off) 41' |
| DF | 7 | (Mexico) Sergio Almaguer |
| DF | 13 | (Mexico) Melvin Brown | (yellow card) 34' |
| MF | 6 | (Mexico) José Hernández |
| MF | 22 | (Chile) Pablo Galdames | (yellow card) 76' |
| MF | 5 | (Mexico) Victor Gutiérrez | (yellow card) 68' | (substituted off) 53' |
| MF | 11 | (Mexico) (Brazil) Julio Pinheiro |
| MF | 20 | (Argentina) Ángel Morales |
| FW | 18 | (Paraguay) José Cardozo | (yellow card) 51' |
| FW | 15 | (Mexico) Juan Palencia (c) |
Substitutes:
| GK | 21 | (Mexico) Carlos Pérez |
| MF | 8 | (Mexico) Tomás Campos | | (substituted on) 41' |
| DF | 9 | (Mexico) Emilio Mora |
| DF | 4 | (Peru) Juan Reynoso |
| MF | 10 | (Mexico) Héctor Adomaitis | | (substituted on) 53' |
| FW | 14 | (Argentina) Gonzalo Belloso |
| FW | 19 | (Mexico) Omar Rodríguez |
Manager:
(Mexico) José Trejo

| GK | 1 | (Colombia) Oscar Córdoba |
| DF | 4 | (Argentina) Hugo Ibarra |
| DF | 2 | (Colombia) Jorge Bermúdez (c) |
| DF | 14 | (Argentina) Nicolás Burdisso |
| DF | 3 | (Argentina) Clemente Rodríguez | (yellow card) 40' | (substituted off) 55' |
| MF | 19 | (Argentina) Javier Villarreal | | (substituted off) 78' |
| MF | 24 | (Argentina) Sebastián Battaglia |
| DF | 13 | (Argentina) Cristian Traverso | (yellow card) 67' |
| MF | 10 | (Argentina) Juan Riquelme |
| FW | 17 | (Argentina) Walter Gaitán | (yellow card) 15' |
| FW | 21 | (Argentina) Christian Gimenez | | (substituted off) 60' |
Substitutes:
| GK | 12 | (Argentina) Roberto Abbondanzieri |
| MF | 8 | (Argentina) Julio Marchant |
| FW | 9 | (Argentina) Antonio Barijho |
| MF | 11 | (Peru) José Pereda | (yellow card) 82' | (substituted on) 78' |
| MF | 15 | (Argentina) Omar Pérez |
| FW | 16 | (Argentina) Marcelo Delgado | | (substituted on) 60' |
| MF | 22 | (Argentina) Gustavo Pinto | | (substituted on) 55' |
Manager:
(Argentina) Carlos Bianchi

Man of the Match:
(Argentina) Juan Román Riquelme

Assistant referees:
(Brazil) Jorge Paulo Oliveira
(Brazil) Aristeu Tavares
Fourth official:
(Brazil) Wagner Tardelli

=== Second leg ===
June 28, 2001
21:30 (UTC-3)
Second leg

| Boca Juniors (Argentina) | 0–1 | (Mexico) Cruz Azul |
|---|---|---|
| | Report | Palencia 42' |
Penalties
| Riquelme (penalty scored); Serna (penalty scored); Delgado (penalty scored); Bermúdez (penalty missed) | 3–1 | (penalty scored) Palencia; (penalty missed) Galdames; (penalty missed) Hernández; (penalty missed) Pinheiro |

La Bombonera, Buenos Aires
Referee: Gilberto Hidalgo (Peru)

| **Boca Juniors** | **Cruz Azul** |

| GK | 1 | (Colombia) Oscar Córdoba |
| DF | 4 | (Argentina) Hugo Ibarra |
| DF | 2 | (Colombia) Jorge Bermúdez (c) |
| DF | 6 | (Argentina) Aníbal Matellán |
| DF | 3 | (Argentina) Clemente Rodríguez |
| MF | 19 | (Argentina) Javier Villarreal | | (substituted off) 46' |
| MF | 5 | (Colombia) Mauricio Serna |
| DF | 13 | (Argentina) Cristian Traverso |
| MF | 10 | (Argentina) Juan Riquelme |
| FW | 17 | (Argentina) Walter Gaitán |
| FW | 16 | (Argentina) Marcelo Delgado | (yellow card) 20' |
Substitutes:
| GK | 12 | (Argentina) Roberto Abbondanzieri |
| MF | 11 | (Peru) José Pereda |
| FW | 9 | (Argentina) Antonio Barijho |
| MF | 15 | (Argentina) Omar Pérez |
| FW | 21 | (Argentina) Christian Gimenez | | (substituted on) 46' |
| MF | 22 | (Argentina) Gustavo Pinto |
| MF | 24 | (Argentina) Sebastián Battaglia |
Manager:
(Argentina) Carlos Bianchi

| GK | 1 | (Mexico) Oscar Pérez |
| DF | 3 | (Mexico) Norberto Ángeles |
| DF | 7 | (Mexico) Sergio Almaguer | (yellow card) 40' |
| DF | 13 | (Mexico) Melvin Brown |
| MF | 6 | (Mexico) José Hernández |
| MF | 22 | (Chile) Pablo Galdames |
| MF | 5 | (Mexico) Víctor Gutiérrez |
| MF | 8 | (Mexico) Tomás Campos | | (substituted off) 66' |
| MF | 11 | (Mexico) (Brazil) Julio Pinheiro |
| FW | 15 | (Mexico) Juan Palencia (c) |
| FW | 18 | (Paraguay) José Cardozo | (yellow card) 82' |
Substitutes:
| GK | 21 | (Mexico) Carlos Pérez |
| DF | 9 | (Mexico) Emilio Mora | | (substituted on) 66' |
| DF | 2 | (Mexico) Juan Mendoza |
| DF | 4 | (Peru) Juan Reynoso |
| FW | 14 | (Argentina) Gonzalo Belloso |
| MF | 10 | (Mexico) Héctor Adomaitis |
| FW | 19 | (Mexico) Omar Rodríguez |
Manager:
(Mexico) José Trejo

Man of the Match:
(Mexico) Francisco Palencia

Assistant referees:
(Peru) Yuri Pineda
(Peru) Luis Ávila
Fourth official:
(Peru) Eduardo Lecca
