= Miguel Gómez =

Miguel Gómez may refer to:

== Arts and entertainment ==
- Miguel Gómez Bao (1894–1961), Spanish-born Argentine actor
- Miguel Ángel Gómez Martínez (1949–2024), Spanish conductor
- Miguel Gómez (photographer) (born 1974), Colombian-American photographer
- Miguel Gomez (actor) (born 1985), Colombian-American actor and rapper

== Law and politics ==
- José Miguel Gómez (1858–1921), Cuban politician, president of Cuba
- Miguel Mariano Gómez (1890–1950), Cuban politician, president of Cuba, and son of José Miguel Gómez
- Miguel Gómez Martínez (born 1961), Colombian economist and politician

== Sports ==
- Miguel Calderón Gómez (1950–2025), Cuban basketball player
- Miguel Gómez (pitcher, born 1974), Panamanian baseball pitcher
- Miguel Gómez (pitcher, born 2001)
- Miguel Gómez Palapa (born 1974), Mexican football midfielder
- Miguel Gómez (infielder) (born 1992), Dominican baseball infielder
- Miguel Gómez (footballer, born 2002), Mexican professional footballer

== Others ==
- Miguel Gómez Damas (1785–1849), Spanish Carlist general

== See also ==
- Miguel Gomes (disambiguation)
