= Víctor Gutiérrez =

Víctor Gutiérrez may refer to:

- Víctor Gutiérrez (footballer) (born 1978), Mexican football player
- Víctor Gutiérrez (water polo) (born 1991), Spanish water polo player
- Víctor Manuel Gutiérrez (1922–1966), Guatemalan labour leader
- Victor M. Gutierrez, freelance writer who made unproven claims against Michael Jackson; see 1993 child sexual abuse accusations against Michael Jackson
