= Pablo Galdames =

Pablo Galdames may refer to:

- Pablo Galdames (footballer, born 1974), Chilean retired football midfielder
- Pablo Galdames (footballer, born 1996), Chilean football midfielder for Vasco da Gama
