= Miguel Gomes =

Miguel Gomes may refer to:

- Miguel Gomes (director) (born 1972), Portuguese film director
- Miguel Gomes (fencer) (born 1972), Portuguese fencing instructor
- Miguel Gomes (racing driver), Portuguese stock car racing driver

== See also ==
- Miguel Gómez (disambiguation)
