= Martín Andrizzi =

Argentine footballer

Personal information
- Full name: Martín Ezequiel Andrizzi
- Date of birth: June 5, 1976 (age 50)
- Place of birth: Buenos Aires, Argentina
- Height: 1.83 m (6 ft 0 in)
- Position: Left winger

Team information
- Current team: Boca Juniors (youth coach)

Senior career*
| Years | Team | Apps | (Gls) |
| 1994–1997 | All Boys | 65 | (12) |
| 1998–1999 | Brown de Arrecifes | 19 | (5) |
| 1999 | Unión de Santa Fe | 8 | (0) |
| 2000 | San Martín-SJ | 27 | (9) |
| 2000–2001 | Boca Juniors | 1 | (0) |
| 2001–2002 | Estudiantes | 1 | (0) |
| 2002–2003 | Arsenal de Sarandí | 37 | (3) |
| 2003–2004 | Lanús | 35 | (9) |
| 2004 | Dorados | 9 | (1) |
| 2005–2007 | Banfield | 49 | (5) |
| 2007–2008 | Sarandí | 28 | (2) |
| 2008 | Deportivo Quito | 17 | (2) |
| 2009 | San Martín (T) | 14 | (1) |
| 2010–2011 | Belgrano | 30 | (4) |
| 2011–2014 | Sarmiento | 56 | (5) |

Managerial career
- 2019: Almirante Brown
- 2019: Olimpo (assistant)
- 2020–: Boca Juniors (youth coach)
- * Club domestic league appearances and goals

Martín Ezequiel Andrizzi (born 5 June 1976 in Buenos Aires) is an Argentine retired footballer.

== Club career ==
Andrizzi started his playing career in 1994 with All Boys, in 1997 he was signed by Boca Juniors and then spent the next few years out on loan to several different clubs. In 2000 Andrizzi played 5 games for Boca in the Copa Mercosur scoring 1 goal.

In 2001 Andrizzi joined Estudiantes but found his first team opportunities limited. In 2002, he joined newly promoted Arsenal de Sarandí.

In 2003 Andrizzi joined Lanús and in 2004 he played for Mexican club Dorados de Sinaloa. Andrizzi returned to Argentina in 2005 where he played for Banfield, including appearances in the Copa Libertadores in 2007.

In 2007 Andrizzi returned for a second spell with Arsenal de Sarandí, establishing himself as an important member of the first team.

Andrizzi scored the goal Arsenal needed to win the 2007 Copa Sudamericana.

== Coaching career ==
Andrizzi started his coaching career at the end of December 2018 when it was confirmed, that he had been appointed manager of Club Almirante Brown from 1 January 2019. In July 2019, he joined newly appointed manager Sergio Lippi at Club Olimpo as an assistant coach. However, Andrizzi resigned from the position due to health problems.

In February 2020, Andrizzi returned to Boca Juniors as a youth coach.

== Titles ==
| Season | Club | Title |
|---|---|---|
| 2007 | Arsenal de Sarandí | Copa Sudamericana |
