= Norberto Ángeles =

Mexican footballer (1977–2020)

Personal information
- Date of birth: 6 June 1977
- Place of birth: San Juan Tepa, Mexico
- Date of death: 17 August 2020 (aged 43)
- Height: 1.66 m (5 ft 5 in)
- Position: Defender

Senior career*
Years	Team	Apps	(Gls)
- Cruz Azul Hidalgo
2000–2003	Cruz Azul		
2003–2004	Querétaro		
- Lobos BUAP
- Callos de Galiente
- * Club domestic league appearances and goals

Norberto Ángeles (6 June 1977 – 17 August 2020) was a Mexican footballer who played as a defender.

== Career ==
Born in San Juan Tepa, Ángeles played for Cruz Azul Hidalgo, Cruz Azul, Querétaro, Lobos BUAP and Callos de Galiente. With Cruz Azul he played in the 2001 Copa Libertadores Finals.

He retired at the age of 29 to run a transportation business.

He died aged 43 from a heart attack.
