= Néstor Álvarez =

Colombian footballer (born 04-11-1980)

Nestor Alvarez
Personal information
- Full name: Nestor David Álvarez Gutiérrez
- Date of birth: November 4, 1980 (age 45)
- Place of birth: Medellín, Colombia
- Height: 1.83 m (6 ft 0 in)
- Position: Striker

Senior career*
Years	Team	Apps	(Gls)
1999–2002	Envigado		
2003	Deportivo Cali	7	(2)
2004	Envigado		
2005	Once Caldas		
2006	Deportes Tolima		
2006–2007	Academica de Coimbra	13	(2)
2007–2011	U.A. Maracaibo		
2009	→ Alianza F.C. (loan)		
2010	→ Itagüí (loan)		

International career^{‡}
2001–20??	Colombia	?	(?)
- * Club domestic league appearances and goals as of 21 June 2006 ‡ National team caps and goals as of 21 June 2006

Néstor David Álvarez Gutiérrez (born April 11, 1980), or simply known as Néstor, is a Colombian footballer. He played as a forward for Portuguese football club Académica de Coimbra in the Portuguese Liga.

Nestor was born in a poor family in Medellín, Colombia, at a time when civil unrest in the country would not end. He grew up with football, his hero being Carlos Valderrama, and he excelled on the pitch.
