= Víctor Gutiérrez (footballer) =

Mexican footballer (born 1978)

Personal information
- Full name: Víctor Manuel Gutiérrez Castro
- Date of birth: 27 January 1978 (age 48)
- Place of birth: Naucalpan, Estado de Mexico, Mexico
- Height: 1.81 m (5 ft 11 in)
- Position: Defender

Senior career*
Years	Team	Apps	(Gls)
1999–2004	Cruz Azul	118	(2)
2004–2005	Jaguares de Chiapas	20	(1)
2005–2007	Necaxa	41	(0)
2007	Cruz Azul	1	(0)
2008	2 de Mayo	16	(1)
2008–2009	Cruz Azul Hidalgo	4	(0)

International career
2001–2002	Mexico	6	(0)
- * Club domestic league appearances and goals as of 3 July 2010

Víctor Manuel Gutiérrez Castro (born 27 January 1978) is a Mexican former football player who last played for Club Sportivo 2 de Mayo.

Element emerged from the basic forces of the Cruz Azul debuted in 1998 with the Cruz Azul Hidalgo affiliate team.within a few years he became an important player for the team. He has a runner-up with Cruz Azul in the Copa Libertadores 2001. Remains in Cruz Azul to 2004 since it is transferred also Jaguares de Chiapas Hard on the team just a year since starting from the Torneo opening 2005 becomes a reinforcement of the Club Necaxa remains in the rays to the Clausura 2007 since he returned to the team that saw it born where only lasts for one year. From the 2009 is going to play to Paraguay with 3 may where only lasts for one year.

== Club ==
Club performance			League		Cup		Continental		Total	
Season	Club	League	Apps	Goals	Apps	Goals	Apps	Goals	Apps	Goals
Mexico			League		Cup		Continental		Total	
1999-00	Cruz Azul	Primera División	10	0	1	0	-	-	11	0
2000-01	Cruz Azul	Primera División	26	0	4	0	14	1	44	1
2001-02	Cruz Azul	Primera División	31	1	3	0	-	-	34	1
2002-03	Cruz Azul	Primera División	36	1	3	0	12	1	51	2
2003-04	Cruz Azul	Primera División	15	0	-	-	-	-	15	0
2004-05	Jaguares de Chiapas	Primera División	20	1	3	1	-	-	23	2
2005-06	Necaxa	Primera División	26	0	2	0	-	-	28	0
2006-07	Necaxa	Primera División	15	0	1	0	1	0	17	0
2007	Cruz Azul	Primera División	1	0	-	-	-	-	1	0
2008-09	Cruz Azul Hidalgo	Primera División 'A'	4	0	-	-	-	-	4	0
Paraguay			League		Cup		Continental		Total	
2008	2 de Mayo	División de Honor	16	1	-	-	-	-	16	1
Total	Mexico		184	3	17	1	27	2	228	6
Total	Paraguay		16	1	-	-	-	-	16	1
Career total			200	4	17	1	27	2	244	7

== National team ==
He was called on a couple of occasions to the national team during the first era of Javier Aguirre and participated in a World Cup qualifier against the United States. He played on the Mexico National Team at the 2002 CONCACAF Gold Cup.
