= 2001 Copa Libertadores =

42nd season of Copa Libertadores

2001 Copa Libertadores de América
2001 Copa Toyota Libertadores de América 2001 Copa Toyota Libertadores da América

Tournament details
- Dates: 6 February – 28 June
- Teams: 32 (from 11 associations)

Final positions
- Champions: (Argentina) Boca Juniors (4th title)
- Runners-up: (Mexico) Cruz Azul

Tournament statistics
- Matches played: 126
- Goals scored: 378 (3 per match)
- Top scorer: (Brazil) Lopes (9 goals)

The 2001 Copa Libertadores de América was the 42nd edition of CONMEBOL's premier club football tournament. The winners were Boca Juniors, beating Mexican club Cruz Azul in the finals on penalties and lifting their fourth Copa Libertadores trophy.

== First round ==
The first round of the Copa Libertadores drew 32 teams into eight groups of four; two of these teams came from a preliminary round involving two Mexican clubs and two Venezuelan clubs. In each group, teams played against each other home-and-away. Teams receive 3 points for a win, 1 point for a draw, and no points for a loss. If two or more teams are equal on points, the following criteria will be applied to determine the ranking:

1. superior goal difference;
2. higher number of goals scored;
3. higher number of away goals scored;
4. draw.

The top two in each group advanced to the second round.

=== Group 1 ===
| Pos | Team | Pld | W | D | L | GF | GA | GD | Pts |
|---|---|---|---|---|---|---|---|---|---|
| 1 | (Argentina) Rosario Central | 6 | 4 | 1 | 1 | 13 | 4 | +9 | 13 |
| 2 | (Colombia) Junior | 6 | 3 | 1 | 2 | 10 | 6 | +4 | 10 |
| 3 | (Argentina) Vélez Sársfield | 6 | 3 | 0 | 3 | 5 | 8 | −3 | 9 |
| 4 | (Peru) Universitario | 6 | 0 | 2 | 4 | 3 | 13 | −10 | 2 |

=== Group 2 ===
| Pos | Team | Pld | W | D | L | GF | GA | GD | Pts |
|---|---|---|---|---|---|---|---|---|---|
| 1 | (Brazil) Palmeiras | 6 | 5 | 1 | 0 | 16 | 5 | +11 | 16 |
| 2 | (Paraguay) Cerro Porteño | 6 | 4 | 1 | 1 | 17 | 6 | +11 | 13 |
| 3 | Universidad de Chile | 6 | 1 | 1 | 4 | 5 | 13 | −8 | 4 |
| 4 | (Peru) Sport Boys | 6 | 0 | 1 | 5 | 3 | 17 | −14 | 1 |

=== Group 3 ===
| Pos | Team | Pld | W | D | L | GF | GA | GD | Pts |
|---|---|---|---|---|---|---|---|---|---|
| 1 | (Uruguay) Nacional | 6 | 4 | 2 | 0 | 9 | 2 | +7 | 14 |
| 2 | (Chile) Deportes Concepción | 6 | 2 | 1 | 3 | 8 | 8 | 0 | 7 |
| 3 | (Argentina) San Lorenzo | 6 | 2 | 1 | 3 | 9 | 10 | −1 | 7 |
| 4 | (Bolivia) Jorge Wilstermann | 6 | 2 | 0 | 4 | 7 | 13 | −6 | 6 |

=== Group 4 ===
| Pos | Team | Pld | W | D | L | GF | GA | GD | Pts |
|---|---|---|---|---|---|---|---|---|---|
| 1 | (Brazil) Cruzeiro | 6 | 5 | 1 | 0 | 15 | 4 | +11 | 16 |
| 2 | (Ecuador) Emelec | 6 | 2 | 3 | 1 | 7 | 6 | +1 | 9 |
| 3 | (Paraguay) Olimpia | 6 | 1 | 2 | 3 | 10 | 13 | −3 | 5 |
| 4 | (Peru) Sporting Cristal | 6 | 1 | 0 | 5 | 4 | 13 | −9 | 3 |

=== Group 5 ===
| Pos | Team | Pld | W | D | L | GF | GA | GD | Pts |
|---|---|---|---|---|---|---|---|---|---|
| 1 | (Argentina) River Plate | 6 | 4 | 0 | 2 | 13 | 6 | +7 | 12 |
| 2 | (Ecuador) El Nacional | 6 | 3 | 0 | 3 | 8 | 9 | −1 | 9 |
| 3 | (Paraguay) Guaraní | 6 | 2 | 1 | 3 | 9 | 11 | −2 | 7 |
| 4 | (Bolivia) The Strongest | 6 | 2 | 1 | 3 | 10 | 14 | −4 | 7 |

=== Group 6 ===
| Pos | Team | Pld | W | D | L | GF | GA | GD | Pts |
|---|---|---|---|---|---|---|---|---|---|
| 1 | (Brazil) Vasco da Gama | 6 | 6 | 0 | 0 | 16 | 5 | +11 | 18 |
| 2 | (Colombia) América de Cali | 6 | 4 | 0 | 2 | 10 | 9 | +1 | 12 |
| 3 | (Uruguay) Peñarol | 6 | 1 | 1 | 4 | 7 | 10 | −3 | 4 |
| 4 | (Venezuela) Deportivo Táchira | 6 | 0 | 1 | 5 | 3 | 12 | −9 | 1 |

=== Group 7 ===
| Pos | Team | Pld | W | D | L | GF | GA | GD | Pts |
|---|---|---|---|---|---|---|---|---|---|
| 1 | (Mexico) Cruz Azul | 6 | 4 | 1 | 1 | 12 | 7 | +5 | 13 |
| 2 | (Brazil) São Caetano | 6 | 2 | 2 | 2 | 6 | 4 | +2 | 8 |
| 3 | (Uruguay) Defensor Sporting | 6 | 2 | 1 | 3 | 8 | 11 | −3 | 7 |
| 4 | (Ecuador) Olmedo | 6 | 2 | 0 | 4 | 11 | 15 | −4 | 6 |

=== Group 8 ===
| Pos | Team | Pld | W | D | L | GF | GA | GD | Pts |
|---|---|---|---|---|---|---|---|---|---|
| 1 | (Argentina) Boca Juniors | 6 | 5 | 0 | 1 | 7 | 5 | +2 | 15 |
| 2 | (Chile) Cobreloa | 6 | 3 | 1 | 2 | 8 | 7 | +1 | 10 |
| 3 | (Colombia) Deportivo Cali | 6 | 3 | 0 | 3 | 13 | 8 | +5 | 9 |
| 4 | (Bolivia) Oriente Petrolero | 6 | 0 | 1 | 5 | 6 | 14 | −8 | 1 |

== Knockout phase ==
In the knockout phase, teams played against each other over two legs on a home-and-away basis. If teams are tied on points and goals after both legs (180 minutes of play), a penalty shootout is carried out.

=== Bracket ===
Round of 16
(Argentina) Rosario Central | 3 | 1 | 4
(Chile) Cobreloa | 2 | 1 | 3
(Uruguay) Nacional | 0 | 1 | 1
(Colombia) América | 2 | 3 | 5
(Argentina) River Plate | 0 | 5 | 5
(Ecuador) Emelec | 2 | 0 | 2
(Mexico) Cruz Azul | 1 | 3 | 4
(Paraguay) Cerro Porteño | 2 | 1 | 3
(Brazil) Palmeiras | 0 | 1 | 1 (5)
(Brazil) São Caetano | 1 | 0 | 1 (3)
(Brazil) Cruzeiro | 2 | 4 | 6
(Ecuador) El Nacional | 1 | 1 | 2
(Brazil) Vasco da Gama | 3 | 1 | 4
(Chile) Deportes Concepción | 1 | 0 | 1
(Argentina) Boca Juniors | 3 | 1 | 4
(Colombia) Junior | 2 | 1 | 3

Quarter-finals
(Argentina) Rosario Central | 1 | 2 | 3 (4)
(Colombia) América | 0 | 3 | 3 (3)
(Argentina) River Plate | 0 | 0 | 0
(Mexico) Cruz Azul | 0 | 3 | 3
(Brazil) Palmeiras | 3 | 2 | 5 (4)
(Brazil) Cruzeiro | 3 | 2 | 5 (3)
(Brazil) Vasco da Gama | 0 | 0 | 0
(Argentina) Boca Juniors | 1 | 3 | 4

Semi-finals
(Argentina) Rosario Central | 0 | 3 | 3
(Mexico) Cruz Azul | 2 | 3 | 5
(Brazil) Palmeiras | 2 | 2 | 4 (2)
(Argentina) Boca Juniors | 2 | 2 | 4 (3)

Finals
(Mexico) Cruz Azul | 0 | 1 | 1 (1)
(Argentina) Boca Juniors | 1 | 0 | 1 (3)

=== Round of 16 ===
| 8 May 2001 L1 | El Nacional | 1-2 | Cruzeiro | Estadio Olimpico Atahualpa, Quito |

| 15 May 2001 L2 | Cruzeiro | 4-1 (6-2 agg.) | El Nacional | Estadio Mineirao, Belo Horizonte |

| 9 May 2001 L1 | São Caetano | 1-0 | Palmeiras | Estadio Anacleto Campanella, São Caetano do Sul |

| 16 May 2001 L2 | Palmeiras | 1-0 (5-3 p) | São Caetano | Estadio Palestra Italia, São Paulo |

| 10 May 2001 L1 | Junior | 2-3 | Boca Juniors | Estadio Metropolitano, Barranquilla |

| 16 May 2001 L2 | Boca Juniors | 1-1 (4-3 agg.) | Junior | Estadio La Bombonera, Buenos Aires |

| 9 May 2001 L1 | Deportes Concepcion | 1-3 | Vasco da Gama | Estadio Municipal, Concepcion |

| 16 May 2001 L2 | Vasco Da Gama | 1-0 (4-1 agg.) | Deportes Concepcion | Estadio Sao Januario, Rio de Janeiro |

=== Finals ===
20 June 2001
19:30 (UTC-6)

| Cruz Azul (Mexico) | 0 – 1 | (Argentina) Boca Juniors |
|---|---|---|
| | (Report) | Delgado 85' |

Estadio Azteca, Mexico City
Attendance: 115,000
Referee: Márcio Rezende (Brazil)
28 June 2001
21:30 (UTC-3)

| Boca Juniors (Argentina) | 0 – 1 | (Mexico) Cruz Azul |
|---|---|---|
| | (Report) | Palencia 42' |
Penalties
| Riquelme (penalty scored); Serna (penalty scored); Delgado (penalty scored); Bermúdez (penalty missed) | 3 – 1 | (penalty scored) Palencia; (penalty missed) Galdames; (penalty missed) Hernández; (penalty missed) Pinheiro |

Estadio Alberto J. Armando (La Bombonera), Buenos Aires
Attendance: 60,000
Referee: Gilberto Hidalgo (Peru)
