= Germán Hornos =

Uruguayan footballer (born 1982)

Personal information
- Full name: Germán Andrés Hornos Correa
- Date of birth: 21 August 1982 (age 44)
- Place of birth: San José de Mayo, Uruguay
- Height: 1.81 m (5 ft 11 1/2 in)
- Position: Forward

Youth career
- Durazno
- 2001: Fénix

Senior career*
Years	Team	Apps	(Gls)
2001–2003	Fénix	55	(43)
2003–2008	Sevilla	16	(2)
2004–2006	→ Real Valladolid (loan)	16	(8)
2006	→ Bella Vista (loan)	4	(0)
2007	→ River Plate Montevideo (loan)	13	(4)
2007	→ Central Español (loan)	10	(5)
2008	→ Tacuarembó (loan)	10	(1)
2009	Arles-Avignon	0	(0)
2010	Durazno	6	(2)
2011	Ñublense	0	(0)
Total		130	(65)

International career
2002–2004	Uruguay	7	(1)
- * Club domestic league appearances and goals

Germán Andrés Hornos Correa (born 21 August 1982) is a Uruguayan former footballer who played as a forward.

== Career ==
Hornos made his professional debut with Fénix in 2002, aged 20. In June 2003, he signed with Spanish club Sevilla. The next seasons, he was loaned out to Real Valladolid in Spain and Bella Vista, River Plate de Montevideo, Central Español and Tacuarembó in his homeland until 2008.

== Personal life ==
On 24 December 2004, Hornos suffered serious brain injuries as a result of a car accident in Durazno, Uruguay.

Despite Hornos graduated as a football manager, he involved in real estate business.

== Career statistics ==
=== International ===
Appearances and goals by national team and year
National team	Year	Apps	Goals
Uruguay	2002	1	0
Uruguay	2003	4	1
Uruguay	2004	2	0
Total		7	1

Scores and results list Uruguay's goal tally first, score column indicates score after each Hornos goal.

List of international goals scored by Germán Hornos
No.	Date	Venue	Opponent	Score	Result	Competition
1	8 June 2003	Seoul World Cup Stadium, Seoul, South Korea	South Korea	1–0	2–0	Friendly
