= Mario Ortiz (Mexican footballer) =

Mexican footballer (born 1983)

Personal information
- Full name: Mario Virginio Ortiz Velásquez
- Date of birth: 4 June 1983 (age 43)
- Place of birth: Juchitán, Oaxaca, Mexico
- Height: 1.79 m (5 ft 10 1/2 in)
- Position: Forward

Senior career*
Years	Team	Apps	(Gls)
2000–2006	Cruz Azul	41	(6)
2004	→ Querétaro (loan)	13	(2)
2007–2008	Puebla	17	(5)
2008–2009	Estudiantes Tecos	21	(4)
2009–2010	Cruz Azul	29	(5)
2010	Puebla	16	(0)
2010–2012	Atlante	24	(4)
2012	→ Puebla (loan)	5	(1)
2013	→ San Luis (loan)	8	(1)
2013–2014	→ Chiapas (loan)	11	(7)
2014–2015	Tepic	23	(6)
2015–2018	Juárez	66	(11)
2018	Tapachula	7	(1)

Managerial career
- 2018–2020: Guadalajara Reserves and Academy
- 2021–2022: Tapatío (Assistant)
- 2022–2023: Guadalajara Reserves and Academy
- 2023–2024: Tapatío (Assistant)
- 2025–2026: Atlético Morelia
- * Club domestic league appearances and goals

Mario Virginio Ortiz Velásquez (born 4 June 1983) is a Mexican former professional footballer who played as a forward.

== Club career ==
Ortiz made his professional debut with Cruz Azul in 2000. He was loaned to Querétaro FC for one tournament-deal. After this tournament, he returned to Cruz Azul where he played until 2006 after which, he was transferred to Puebla F.C. He spent one year in the institution where he was again transferred to another club, Tecos. He had a good performance in this team which caused Mexican manager Enrique Meza to request Cruz Azul to sign him again. He finally returned to Cruz Azul for Apertura 2009. During his spell at Chiapas he only played with the reserve squad.
