= Daniel Baldi =

Uruguayan football striker (born 1981)

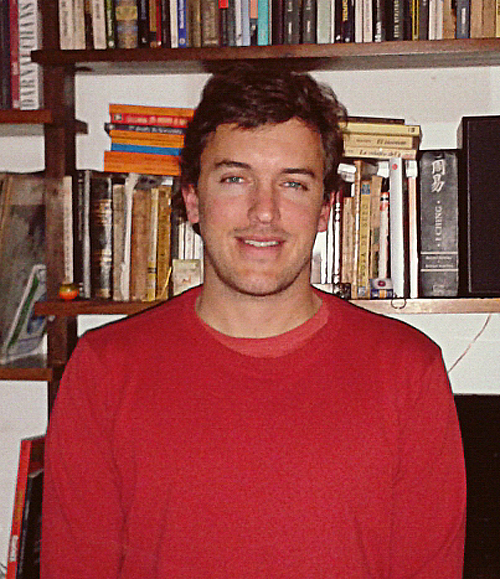
- Baldi in 2014

Personal information
- Full name: Daniel Eduardo Baldi Alfano
- Date of birth: 23 November 1981 (age 44)
- Place of birth: Colonia del Sacramento, Uruguay
- Height: 1.80 m (5 ft 11 in)
- Position: Striker

Team information
- Current team: Danubio

Senior career*
Years	Team	Apps	(Gls)
2001–2007	Plaza Colonia	48	(10)
2003	→ Cruz Azul (loan)	6	(1)
2004	→ Peñarol (loan)	5	(0)
2004–2005	→ Nueva Chicago (loan)	9	(0)
2006	→ Mineros de Guayana (loan)		
2006	→ Treviso (loan)	2	(0)
2007	→ Teramo (loan)	5	(0)
2007–2008	Cerro	21	(2)
2008–2009	Danubio	8	(0)
2009–	Bella Vista		
- * Club domestic league appearances and goals as of 27 January 2009

Daniel Eduardo Baldi Alfano (born 23 November 1981) is a Uruguayan former football (soccer) striker who played for Bella Vista in the Primera División Uruguaya. Currently he works as a trainer and has become famous as a writer.

== Club career ==
Baldi had loan spells in the Primera División de México with Cruz Azul and in Italy's Serie B with Treviso.

== Writer ==
Baldi started writing books for children and youth about his passion, soccer, with astounding success.

- 2006, La Botella F. C. 9974493781 Fin de Siglo
- 2007, La Botella F. C. ¡La 10 a la cancha! 9789974493889 Fin de Siglo
- 2007, El desafío de la montaña. 9789974494107 Fin de Siglo
- 2008, La Botella F. C. La 11 se la juega. 9789974494213 Fin de Siglo
- 2009, La Botella F. C. El salto a los 12. 9789974494534 Fin de Siglo
- 2010, La Botella F.C. El desafío final. Fin de Siglo
- 2010, Mi mundial 978-9974-95-376-5 Alfaguara Libro infantil, foreword by Diego Lugano.
- 2011, El súper Maxi del gol. Alfaguara
- 2012, Los mellis 9789974956018 Alfaguara Libro infantil, foreword by Alejandra Forlán.
- 2013, Entre dos pasiones 9789974956971 Alfaguara
- 2014, Mi mundial 2 9789974958210 Alfaguara Libro infantil, foreword by Diego Lugano.
- 2014, Elige tu propio penal 978-9974-95-824-1 Alfaguara
- 2015, Estadio Lleno 9789974958661 Alfaguara
- 2016, El muro 9789974959163 loqueleo.

In 2017 a film based on Mi mundial was released.
