= Facundo Imboden =

Argentine footballer (born 1980)

Personal information
- Full name: Facundo Jorge Imboden
- Date of birth: 2 February 1980 (age 46)
- Place of birth: Buenos Aires, Argentina
- Height: 1.80 m (5 ft 11 in)
- Position: Defender

Youth career
- 1992–2000: Boca Juniors

Senior career*
Years	Team	Apps	(Gls)
2000–2004	Boca Juniors	11	(0)
2001–2002	→ Belgrano (loan)	27	(0)
2002–2003	→ Millonarios (loan)	8	(0)
2004–2005	Olimpo	10	(0)
2005–2009	Universidad Católica	120	(2)
2010	Gimnasia La Plata	7	(0)
2010–2011	Ferro Carril Oeste	19	(0)
2011	Deportivo Cuenca	19	(0)
- * Club domestic league appearances and goals

Facundo Jorge Imboden (born 2 February 1980 in Buenos Aires) is an Argentine former football defender.

== Career ==
In 2010, Imboden joined Argentine second division side Ferro Carril Oeste.

=== Temas ===
- (Argentina) Boca Juniors 1999–2004
- (Argentina) Belgrano (loan) 2001–2002
- (Colombia) Millonarios (loan) 2002–2003
- (Argentina) Olimpo 2004–2005
- (Chile) Universidad Católica 2005–2009
- (Argentina) Gimnasia y Esgrima La Plata 2010
- (Argentina) Ferro Carril Oeste 2010–2011
- (Ecuador) Deportivo Cuenca 2011

== Honours ==
Universidad Católica

- Primera División de Chile (1): 2005 Clausura
