= Melvin Brown (footballer) =

Mexican footballer (born 1979)

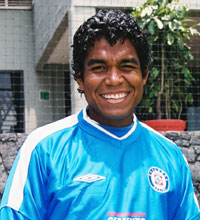
- Brown with Cruz Azul

Personal information
- Full name: Melvin Brown Casados
- Date of birth: 28 January 1979 (age 47)
- Place of birth: Naranjos, Veracruz, Mexico
- Height: 1.75 m (5 ft 9 in)
- Position: Centre-back

Senior career*
Years	Team	Apps	(Gls)
2001–2004	Cruz Azul	101	(5)
2004–2008	Chiapas	125	(5)
2008	→ Puebla (loan)	16	(1)
2008–2012	Tecos	17	(1)
2009–2010	→ Cruz Azul (loan)	23	(4)
2010–2011	→ Puebla (loan)	14	(0)
2012–2013	Cruz Azul Hidalgo	5	(0)
2012–2013	→ Irapuato (loan)	23	(0)
Total		324	(16)

International career
2001–2003	Mexico	10	(0)

Managerial career
- 2017: Dorados de Sinaloa Premier
- 2019–2020: Cafetaleros de Chiapas Premier
- * Club domestic league appearances and goals

Melvin Brown Casados (born 28 January 1979) is a Mexican former professional footballer who played as a centre-back.

Brown made his debut in the Primera División with Cruz Azul in the 2001 Apertura, and quickly became a mainstay at defense for the club. In his three and a half years with the club, he played in 109 games, scoring five goals. Following the 2004 Clausura, Brown was transferred to the Jaguares at the request of his coach at Cruz Azul, José Luis Trejo.

== International career ==
Born in Mexico, Brown is of Jamaican descent through his paternal grandfather. Despite an approach by the Jamaica Football Federation inviting him to join the country national team, he opted to play for his country of birth at under-23 level. He ended up making his international debut with the Mexico senior side, on 1 July 2001, in a 1–0 home win over the United States. He was later named to the roster for the 2002 FIFA World Cup, but he was not used during the tournament.

== Career statistics ==
=== International ===
As of match played 6 July 2003

National team	Year	Apps	Goals
Mexico	2001	5	0
Mexico	2002	4	0
Mexico	2003	1	0
Total		10	0

== See also ==
- Afro-Mexicans
