= Tomás Campos =

Mexican footballer (born 1975)

Personal information
- Full name: Tomás Alberto Campos Alejandre
- Date of birth: 14 September 1975 (age 51)
- Place of birth: Tuxpan, Veracruz, Mexico
- Height: 1.65 m (5 ft 5 in)
- Position: Midfielder

Team information
- Current team: Juárez U21 (Assistant)

Senior career*
Years	Team	Apps	(Gls)
2000–2006	Cruz Azul	227	(4)
2006	→ Tigres (loan)	8	(0)
2007	→ Jaguares (loan)	11	(0)
2008–2012	→ Indios (loan)		

International career
2001–2002	Mexico	7	(1)

Managerial career
- 2017–2024: Juárez Reserves and Academy
- 2018: Juárez (interim)
- 2024–2025: Juárez (assistant)
- 2026–: Juárez Reserves and Academy
- * Club domestic league appearances and goals

Tomás Alberto Campos Alejandre (born 14 September 1975) is a Mexican former professional footballer, who was captain for Indios de Ciudad Juárez in the Liga de Ascenso, and interim manager for Juárez.

Campos was part of the Cruz Azul side that became the first national team to reach the final of the Copa Libertadores.

A left-sided wingback or midfielder, Campos earned seven caps for Mexico in 2001 and 2002, scoring one goal. He was a part of the first selection called up by Javier Aguirre upon Aguirre's first appointment as national team head coach in June 2001.

== Managerial career ==
=== FC Juárez ===
==== B team ====
Campos was appointed the coach of the newly formed Tercera División affiliate team of FC Juárez for the 2017–18 season. Campos maintained an undefeated streak of 21 matches. On 19 March 2018, the board of FC Juárez announced that Campos would be the interim manager for the rest of the first team's Clausura 2018 season, after sacking Miguel Fuentes.

== International goals ==
No.	Date	Venue	Opponent	Score	Result	Competition	Ref.
1.	October 31, 2001	Puebla, Mexico	El Salvador	4–1	Win	Friendly	

- Mexico national football team 1000th goal

== Honours ==
Indios de Ciudad Juárez

- Primera División A: Apertura 2007
- Campeón de Ascenso: 2007–08 Primera División A
