= Miguel Gómez Palapa =

Mexican footballer (born 1974)

Personal information
- Full name: Miguel Ángel Gómez Palapa
- Date of birth: 6 September 1974 (age 52)
- Place of birth: Mexico City, Mexico
- Height: 1.74 m (5 ft 9 in)
- Position: Midfielder

Youth career
- Cruz Azul Hidalgo

Senior career*
Years	Team	Apps	(Gls)
2000–2003	Cruz Azul	20	(0)
2003	León	4	(0)
2004	Tapachula	4	(1)
2004–2007	Chiapas	47	(1)

Managerial career
- 2008–2017: Chiapas Reserves and Academy (assistant)
- * Club domestic league appearances and goals

Miguel Ángel Gómez Palapa (born 6 September 1974) is a former Mexican professional football midfielder.

== Career ==
Gómez Palapa started his youth career at Cruz Azul Hidalgo. In 2000, he was promoted to the senior club, Cruz Azul, where he played until 2003. Later he moved to León and to Chiapas's farm team Jaguares de Tapachula. From 2004 until his retirement in 2007 he played for Chiapas. Afterwards, he worked for Chiapas as manager of youth categories of the club, until its dissolution in June 2017.

Before joining Cruz Azul, Gómez Palapa was studying a B. A. in Graphic Design, which he dropped to focus on his career as professional footballer.
