= Francisco Palencia =

Mexican footballer and manager (born 1973)

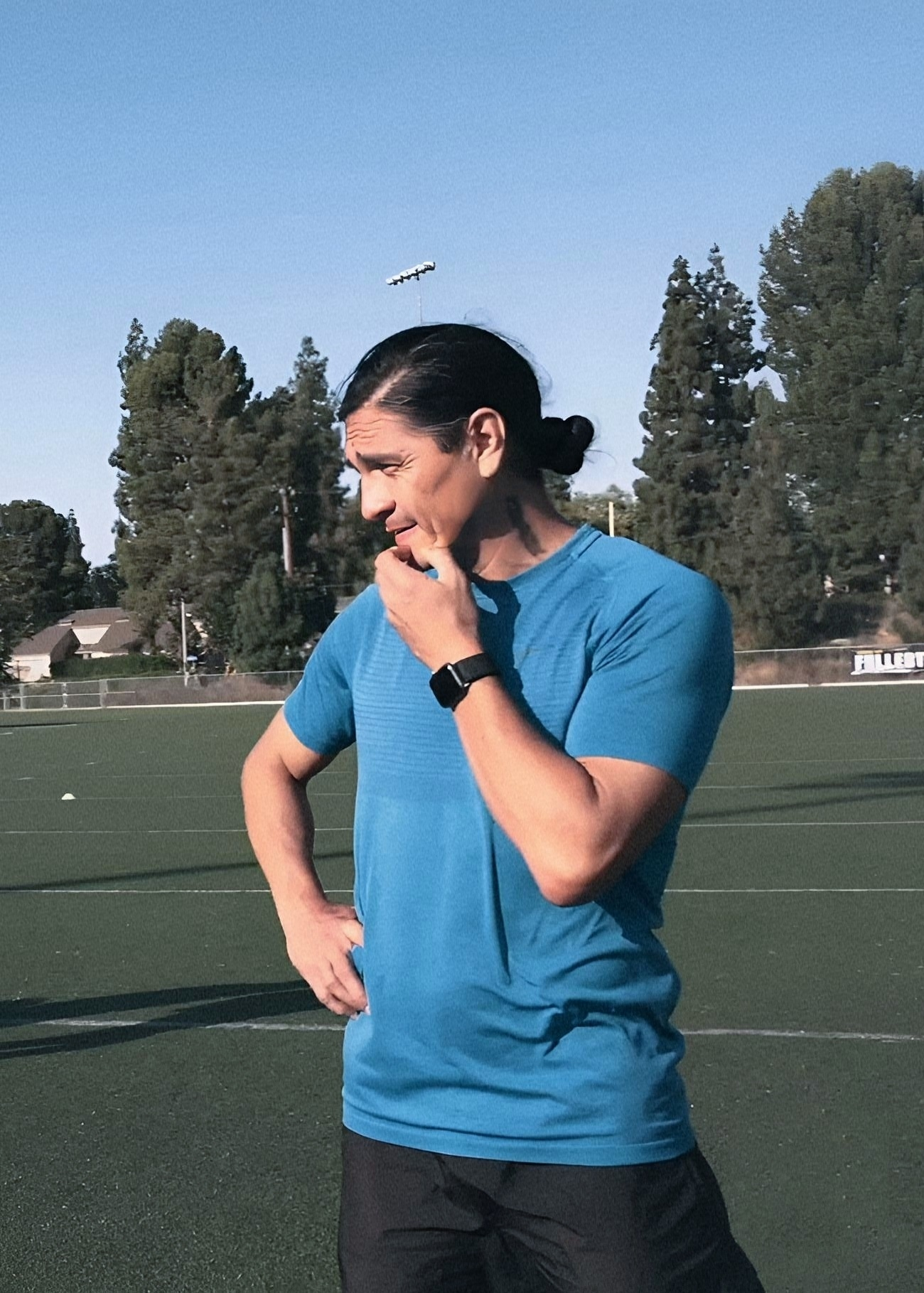
- Palencia in 2022

Personal information
- Full name: Juan Francisco Palencia Hernández
- Date of birth: 28 April 1973 (age 53)
- Place of birth: Mexico City, Mexico
- Height: 5 ft 8 in (1.73 m)
- Position: Midfielder

Senior career*
Years	Team	Apps	(Gls)
1994–2003	Cruz Azul	239	(91)
2001–2002	→ Espanyol (loan)	30	(6)
2003–2005	Guadalajara	73	(13)
2005–2006	Chivas USA	34	(8)
2007–2011	Pumas UNAM	165	(19)
Total		541	(137)

International career
1996–2009	Mexico	80	(12)

Managerial career
- 2016–2017: Pumas UNAM
- 2018–2019: Lobos BUAP
- 2020: Mazatlán
- 2021: Tec Academy Barcelona
- 2023–2024: Sporting F.C.
Medal record
Men's football
Representing Mexico
FIFA Confederations Cup
Winner	1999 Mexico
CONCACAF Gold Cup
Winner	1998 United States
Copa América
Third place	1997 Bolivia
Third place	1999 Paraguay
- * Club domestic league appearances and goals

Juan Francisco "Paco" Palencia Hernández (born 28 April 1973) is a Mexican professional football manager and former footballer. Palencia began his career with Cruz Azul, where he played for nearly a decade and won multiple championships, including the Verano 1997 league title. He also participated in the 2001 Copa Libertadores, finishing as a runner-up and scored one goal in the final.

== Club career ==
=== Cruz Azul ===
Palencia began his professional career with Cruz Azul after progressing through the club's youth system. He made his debut on December 23, 1994, in a match against Correcaminos.

By his second season, Palencia had become a regular starter, contributing goals and assists. In 1996, he participated in Cruz Azul's Copa México victory, appearing as a substitute in the final against Toros Neza. The following year, he was part of the squad that won the club's eighth league title, defeating León at the Nou Camp.

During this period, Cruz Azul also won consecutive CONCACAF Champions Cup titles in 1996 and 1997, with Palencia playing a role in both campaigns.

After Carlos Hermosillo left the club in 1998, Palencia was named team captain, a role he held until 2001.

In the 2001 Copa Libertadores, Palencia contributed to Cruz Azul's run to the final. He scored twice against River Plate and added two more goals against Rosario Central, including one in the final moments of the semifinal. Cruz Azul finished as runners-up after a penalty shootout loss to Boca Juniors.

==== Loan to Espanyol ====
Palencia joined La Liga club Espanyol on a one-year loan for the 2001–02 season. He made 31 appearances and scored six goals. After Cruz Azul and Espanyol were unable to reach a financial agreement, Palencia returned to Mexico.

=== Guadalajara ===
In August 2003, Palencia transferred to Guadalajara following a breakdown in relations with Cruz Azul.

In the Clausura 2004, Guadalajara reached the final, where they lost to Pumas UNAM in a penalty shootout. The following year, Palencia scored five goals during the club's 2005 Copa Libertadores campaign, which ended in a semifinal loss to Athletico Paranaense.

=== Chivas USA ===
Palencia joined Chivas USA in August 2005, later than originally planned due to his commitments with Guadalajara. He scored twice in his debut and was named captain in 2006. At the time, he was the highest-paid player in Major League Soccer, earning an annual salary of US$1,360,000. He made 34 appearances and scored 8 goals during his tenure.

=== Pumas UNAM ===
Palencia signed with Pumas UNAM in January 2007. His performance varied over the seasons, but he played a leading role in the Clausura 2009, helping the team win the league title with a goal in the final against Pachuca.

In the Clausura 2011, he scored in both legs of the final against Morelia, contributing to a 3–2 aggregate victory. This marked the third and final league title of his career. He retired from professional football on November 28, 2011.

== International career ==
Palencia made his international debut for the Mexico national team on June 8, 1996, against Bolivia national team at the U.S. Cup tournament in Dallas, Texas, scoring the winning goal.

Palencia played in the 1996 Summer Olympics in Atlanta, taking his side to the quarterfinals where they were defeated by Nigeria, the eventual winners. He was a member of the national team for the 1996, 1998 and 2003 Gold Cup tournaments and the 1999 Confederations Cup tournament, where he helped Mexico win all four competitions. Palencia also played in two FIFA World Cups, France'98 and Korea-Japan 2002, but could only help his team reach the "Round of 16" of the tournaments before being eliminated. He has also represented his country in three Copa América tournaments in 1997, 1999 and 2004, as well as two Confederations Cup appearances in 1997 and 1999.

In 2006, the veteran striker missed out on selection in Mexico's 23 man squad for the World Cup.

On February 7, Palencia was called up by coach Hugo Sánchez to represent his country and play a friendly game against the United States. The Mexicans lost the match 0–2. However, Palencia played against Paraguay on March 25 and Ecuador on March 28, Mexico winning both matches and Palencia score a goal.

== Managerial career ==
In 2015, Palencia began his managerial career in Spain with FC Sant Cugat, competing in the Juvenil "A" category of the Primera Catalana. On May 30, 2016, Palencia was appointed head coach of Pumas UNAM. His tenure lasted until August 23, 2017, when he was dismissed after six matches of the Apertura 2017 tournament.

On June 1, 2018, Palencia was unveiled as the new head coach of Lobos BUAP, with the primary goal of keeping the club in Mexico's top division. His spell ended in June 2019 when the franchise was sold and relocated to become Juárez, leaving him without a team.

On July 1, 2020, Palencia became the first manager of the new Mazatlán franchise. His stint there concluded in October 2020.

In June 2023, Palencia was appointed head coach of Sporting FC in Costa Rica's top division. On January 29, 2024, he was relieved of his duties.

== Career statistics ==
Club performance			League		Cup		Continental		Total	
Season	Club	League	Apps	Goals	Apps	Goals	Apps	Goals	Apps	Goals
Mexico			League		Cup		North America		Total	
1994–95	Cruz Azul	Primera División	1	0	2	0	-	-	3	0
1995–96	Cruz Azul	Primera División	33	8	3	0	-	-	36	8
1996–97	Cruz Azul	Primera División	32	9	3	0	4	2	39	11
1997–98	Cruz Azul	Primera División	38	10	-	-	3	1	41	11
1998–99	Cruz Azul	Primera División	36	21	1	2	-	-	37	23
1999–00	Cruz Azul	Primera División	38	22	3	0	-	-	42	22
2000–01	Cruz Azul	Primera División	28	14	4	0	20	9	52	23
Spain			League		Copa del Rey		Europe		Total	
2001-02	Espanyol	La Liga	30	6	-	-	-	-	30	6
Mexico			League		Cup		North America		Total	
2002-03	Cruz Azul	Primera División	33	7	3	1	10	3	46	11
2003-04	Guadalajara	Primera División	39	5	3	0	-	-	42	5
2004-05	Guadalajara	Primera División	34	8	3	0	14	5	51	13
USA			League		Open Cup		North America		Total	
2005	Chivas USA	Major League; Soccer	15	4	-	-	-	-	15	4
2006	Chivas USA	Major League; Soccer	19	4	-	-	-	-	19	4
Mexico			League		Cup		North America		Total	
2007	Pumas UNAM	Primera División	16	3	-	-	-	-	16	3
2007-08	Pumas UNAM	Primera División	28	2	3	0	-	-	31	2
2008-09	Pumas UNAM	Primera División	33	6	-	-	5	5	38	11
2009-10	Pumas UNAM	Primera División	33	1	-	-	5	4	38	5
2010-11	Pumas UNAM	Primera División	40	5	-	-	-	-	40	5
2011	Pumas UNAM	Primera División	15	2	-	-	2	0	18	2
Total	Mexico		477	123	27	3	64	29	568	158
Total	Spain		30	6	-	-	-	-	30	6
Total	USA		34	8	-	-	-	-	34	8
Career total			541	137	27	3	64	29	632	169

=== International goals ===
No.	Date	Venue	Opponent	Score	Result	Competition
1	14 December 1997	King Fahd II Stadium, Riyadh, Saudi Arabia	Saudi Arabia	1–0	5–0	1997 FIFA Confederations Cup
2	14 December 1997	King Fahd II Stadium, Riyadh, Saudi Arabia	Saudi Arabia	2–0	5–0	1997 FIFA Confederations Cup
3	4 February 1998	Network Associates Coliseum, Oakland, United States	Trinidad & Tobago	3–1	4–2	1998 CONCACAF Gold Cup
4.	24 February 1998	Pro Player Stadium, Miami Gardens, United States	Netherlands	1–3	2–3	Friendly
5	17 July 1999	Estadio Defensores del Chaco, Asunción, Paraguay	Chile	1–0	2–1	1999 Copa América
6	29 July 1999	Estadio Azteca, Mexico City, Mexico	Bolivia	1–0	1–0	1999 FIFA Confederations Cup
7	13 February 2000	Qualcomm Stadium, San Diego, United States	Trinidad and Tobago	4–0	4–0	2000 CONCACAF Gold Cup
8	11 November 2001	Estadio Azteca, Mexico City, Mexico	Honduras	2–0	3–0	2002 FIFA World Cup qualification
9	16 May 2002	3Com Park at Candlestick Point, San Francisco, United States	Bolivia	1–0	1–0	Friendly
10	19 June 2004	Alamodome, San Antonio, United States	Dominica	10–0	10–0	2006 FIFA World Cup qualification
11	28 March 2007	McAfee Coliseum, Oakland, United States	Ecuador	1–0	4–2	Friendly
12	10 October 2009	Estadio Azteca, Mexico City, Mexico	El Salvador	3–0	4–1	2010 FIFA World Cup qualification

== Honours ==
Cruz Azul

- Mexican Primera División: Invierno 1997
- Copa México: 1996–97
- CONCACAF Champions Cup: 1996, 1997

Pumas UNAM

- Mexican Primera División: Clausura 2009, Clausura 2011

Mexico

- FIFA Confederations Cup: 1999
- CONCACAF Gold Cup: 1998, 2003
- CONCACAF Pre-Olympic Tournament: 1996
