= José Luis Trejo =

Mexican footballer and manager (born 1951)

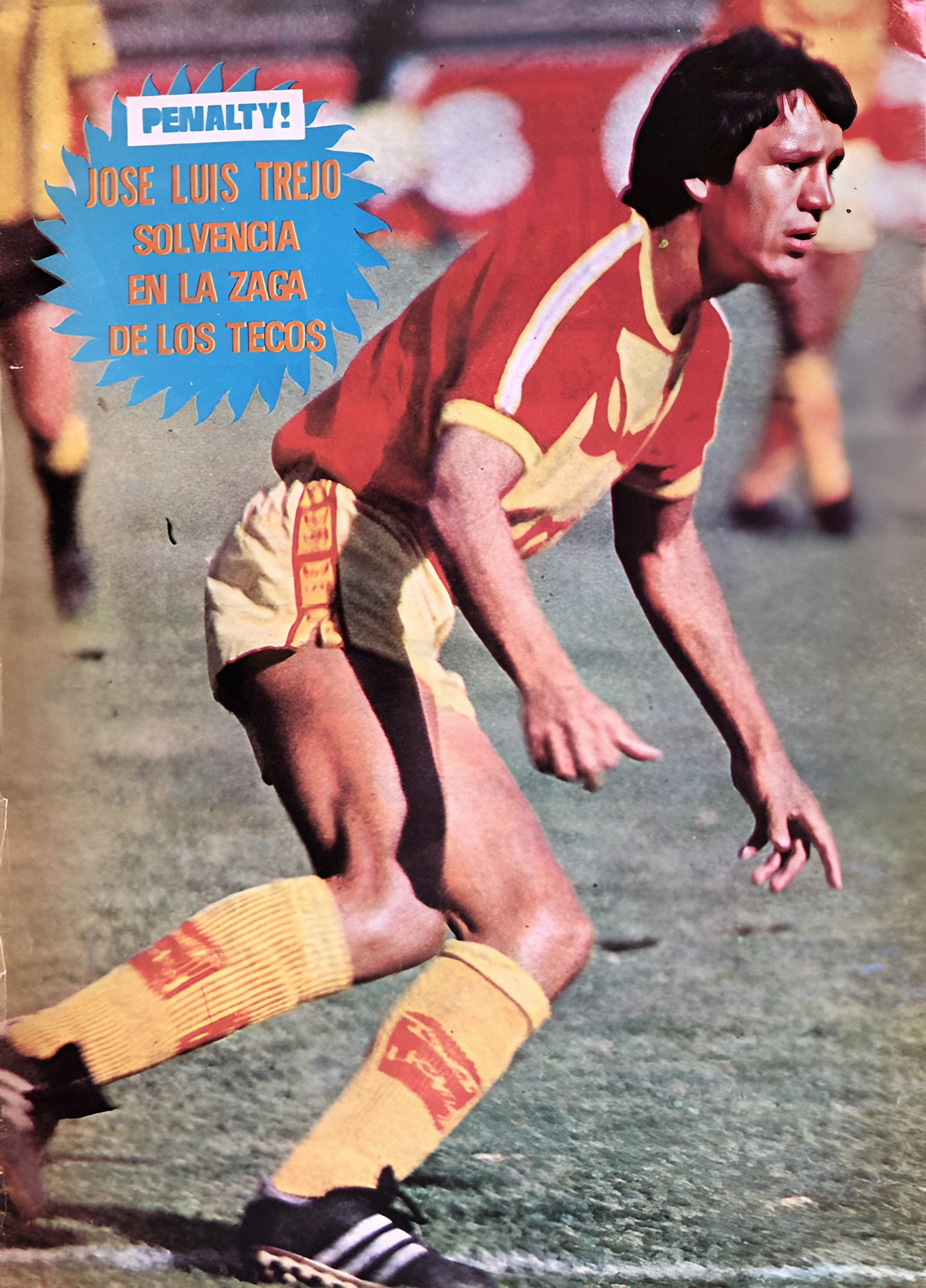

Personal information
- Full name: José Luis Trejo Montoya
- Date of birth: 4 August 1951 (age 75)
- Place of birth: Tepeji, Mexico
- Height: 1.81 m (5 ft 11 1/2 in)
- Position: Centre-back

Team information
- Current team: Inter Playa del Carmen (manager)

Senior career*
| Years | Team | Apps | (Gls) |
| 1971–1978 | Atlético Español | 78 | (0) |
| 1978–1981 | Tecos UAG | 59 | (1) |
| 1981–1982 | Atlético Español | 1 | (0) |
| 1982–1983 | SpVgg Unterhaching | 9 | (0) |

International career
| 1975 | Mexico | 1 | (0) |

Managerial career
- 1998: Toros Neza
- 1999–2000: Cruz Azul Hidalgo
- 2000–2002: Cruz Azul
- 2003–2005: Jaguares
- 2005–2006: Pachuca
- 2006: Tigres
- 2007: Necaxa
- 2007: Morelia
- 2008: Estudiantes Tecos
- 2010–2011: Puebla
- 2012: San Luis
- 2013–2014: UNAM
- 2021–2022: Real Estelí
- 2025: Jaguares
- 2025: Cobán Imperial
- 2025–: Inter Playa del Carmen
- * Club domestic league appearances and goals

José Luis Trejo Montoya (born 4 August 1951) is a Mexican former professional footballer and current manager of Liga Premier de México club Inter Playa del Carmen.

== Career ==
In Mexico, Trejo played club football for Atlético Español and Tecos. He was among the earliest known Mexican footballers to play in Germany having a brief stint with SpVgg Unterhaching during the 1982–1983 season.

Trejo has coached Toros de Neza, Cruz Azul, Chiapas, C.F. Pachuca, UANL Tigres, Monarcas Morelia and Necaxa. He had managed more than 300 First Division matches.

Trejo took Cruz Azul to the Copa Libertadores de América final against Boca Juniors in 2001, which made Cruz Azul the first Mexico team to reach the Libertadores final. The game ended 1–1 on aggregate, and had to be determined on penalties.

In 2006, Trejo won the Clausura with Pachuca.

One day after he won the league, Trejo signed with Tigres to be their coach for one year. Despite having a good record for the first few games, the team began showing lack of commitment. Soon, the record showed eight consecutive games without winning, including a 7–0 defeat against Toluca, and all the responsibility was put on Trejo's management. His last game with Tigres was against Pachuca, the very same team he had made champion a year before. After the team lost 5–0, he was fired on 1 October 2006. Trejo was not unemployed for long, as he was hired by Necaxa after manager Hugo Sánchez left to coach the Mexico national team.

He was fired from UAG Tecos in 2008. He was next employed with the Liga MX Mexican Primera División club San Luis.

On 4 September 2013, Trejo became the new manager of UNAM. On August 15, 2014, after UNAM suffered their 4th consecutive loss, Trejo was sacked and David Patiño was named interim coach.

In June 2019, Trejo was announced as the new coach of the Spanish team Salamanca CF UDS, however, he was unable to take up the position because his UEFA license issued by the German Football Association was not accepted to work in the lower categories of Spanish football. Trejo was placed in the sports intelligence area of the club, but resigned at the end of 2019 due to not having a defined role in the team structure.

In June 2021, Trejo signed with the Nicaraguan team Real Estelí FC. In the Apertura 2021 tournament, his team was runner-up, while in the Clausura 2022, Real Estelí was eliminated in the semi-final round, so Trejo left the club in May 2022.

In January 2025, Trejo signed with Jaguares F.C., a team of the Liga Premier de México – Serie A. At the end of the tournament he was fired after failing to qualify for the promotion play-offs.

In May 2025, Trejo signed with the Guatemalan club Cobán Imperial. In August, he left his position by mutual agreement after a series of poor results.

In November 2025, Trejo signed with the Mexican club Inter Playa del Carmen, which plays in the Liga Premier de México.
