= Pablo Galdames (footballer, born 1974) =

Chilean footballer

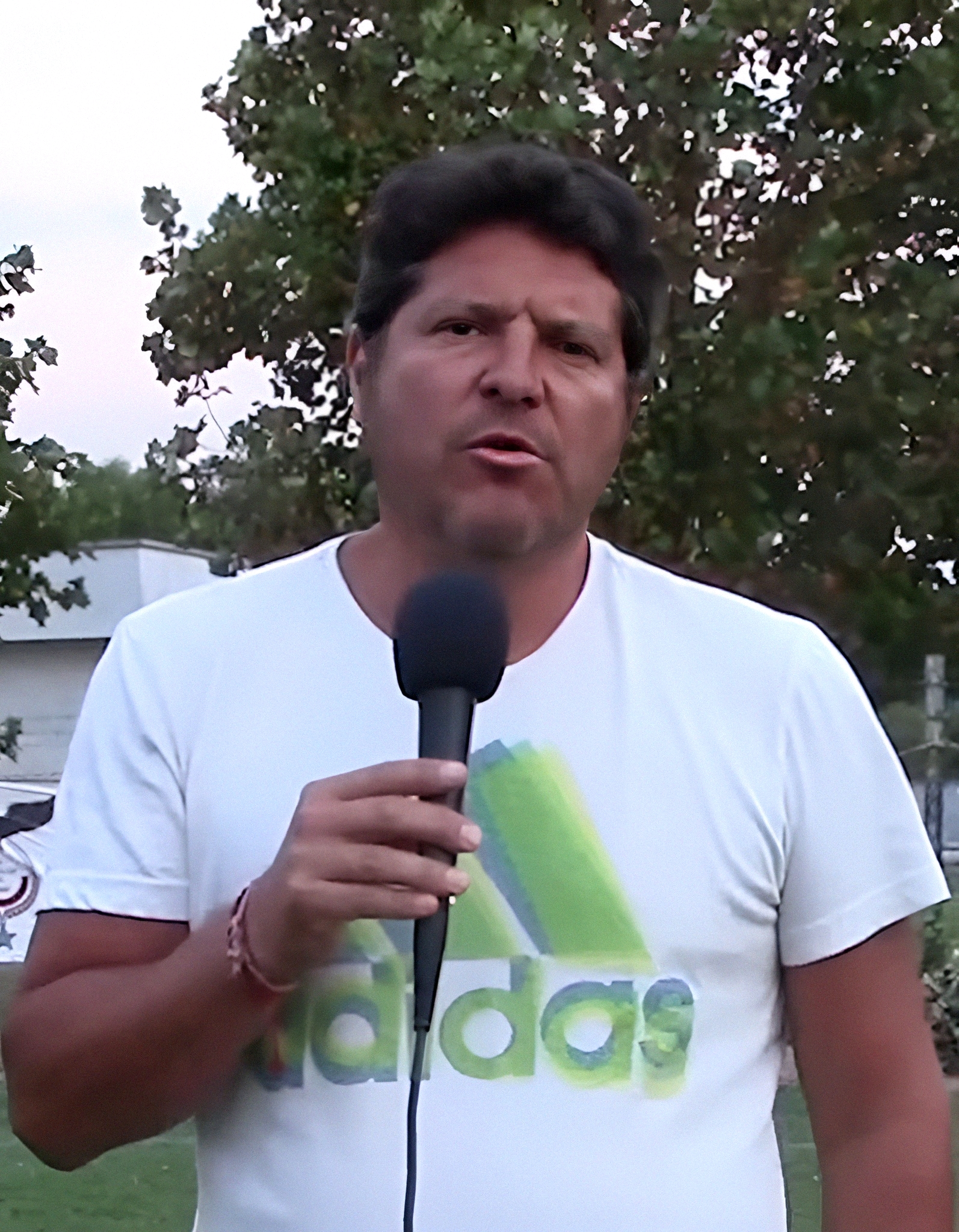

Personal information
- Full name: Pablo Manuel Galdames Díaz
- Date of birth: 26 June 1974 (age 52)
- Place of birth: Los Andes, Chile
- Height: 1.73 m (5 ft 8 in)
- Position: Midfielder

Youth career
- Unión Española

Senior career*
Years	Team	Apps	(Gls)
1993–1995	Unión Española	64	(12)
1996–2000	Universidad de Chile	92	(3)
2000–2001	Cruz Azul	38	(0)
2001–2002	Veracruz	12	(0)
2002–2003	Cruz Azul	8	(0)
2003–2004	Racing Club	7	(0)
2004–2006	Quilmes	33	(0)
2006	América de Cali	5	(0)
2006–2007	Quilmes	3	(0)
2007–2008	Instituto	14	(0)
Total		276	(15)

International career
1995–2001	Chile	22	(2)
- * Club domestic league appearances and goals

Pablo Manuel Galdames Díaz (Spanish pronunciation: [ˈpaβlo ɣalˈdames]; (Note: In isolation, Galdames is pronounced [ɡalˈdames].) born 26 June 1974 Los Andes, Valparaíso Region) is a Chilean former professional footballer who played as a midfielder. He obtained a total number of 22 caps for the Chile national team, scoring two goals between 1995 and 2001.

At the club level, Galdames played for Unión Española and Universidad de Chile in his home country, Cruz Azul and CD Veracruz in Mexico, Colombian side América de Cali, as well as Racing Club, Quilmes AC and Instituto Atlético Central Córdoba from Argentina.

Pablo Galdames obtained his Football Coaching title towards the end of 2013. During the second half of 2014 he took charge of the youth football of Municipal La Pintana, however the incorporation of this club into the Chilean Youth Football did not materialize, in July 2015 he arrived at Trasandino de Los Andes to be coach of the lower divisions of said club.

== Personal life ==
He is the father of the Chilean footballers Pablo Jr. and Thomas and of the Mexican-Chilean footballer Benjamín. He is also the father of Mathías Galdames, who is the half-brother of Pablo Jr., Thomas and Benjamín.

== Political views ==
He is a member of the Independent Regionalist Party (PRI) and in 2017 he supported the presidential candidacy of Sebastián Piñera. Likewise, he was a candidate for a seat in the Chamber of Deputies representing the 8th district.

== Honours ==
=== Player ===
Unión Española

- Copa Chile: 1993

Universidad de Chile

- Primera División de Chile: 1999, 2000
- Copa Chile: 1998, 2000

Cruz Azul

- Copa Libertadores runner-up: 2001
