= Julio César Pinheiro =

Brazilian footballer (born 1976)

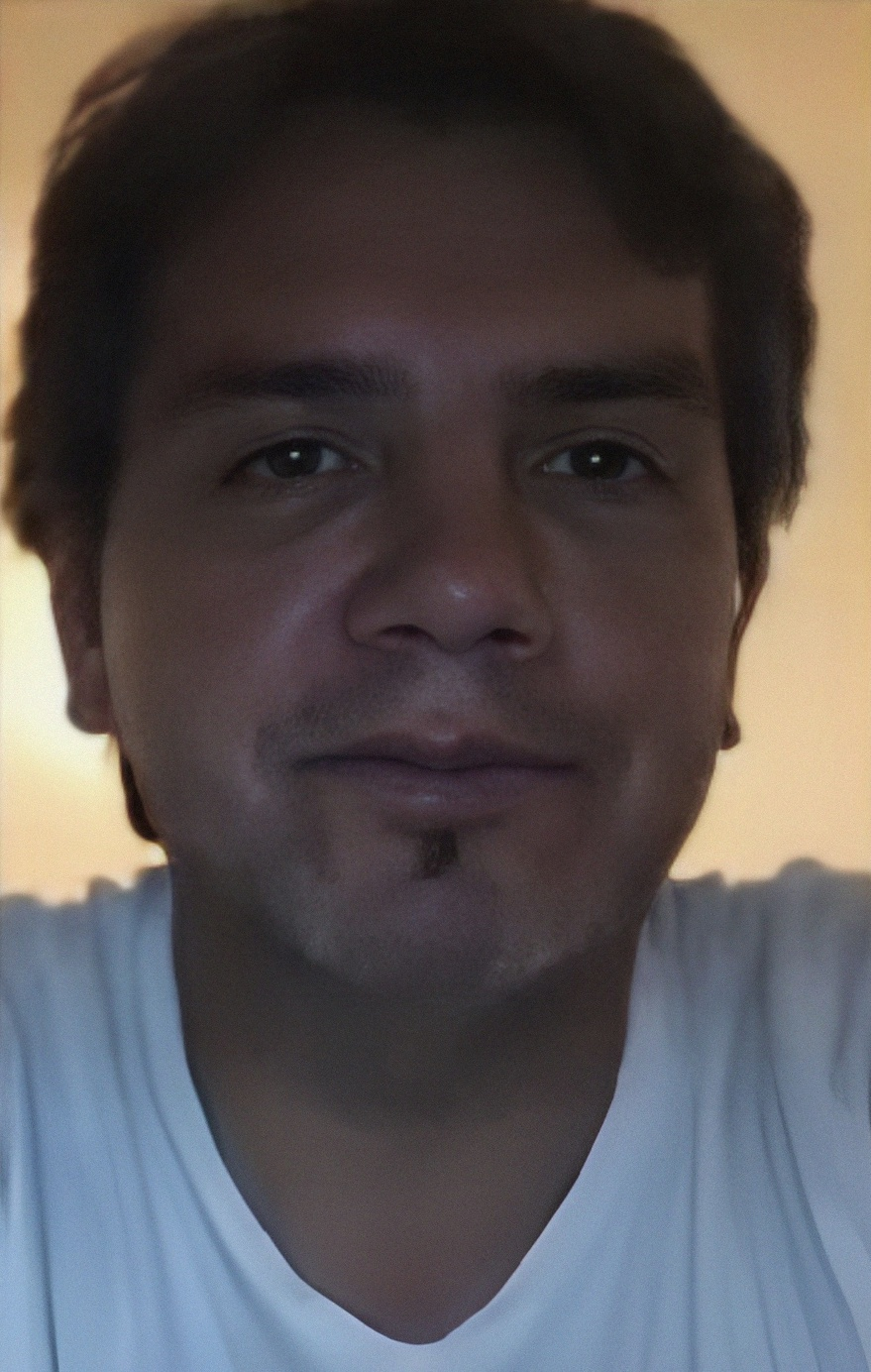

Personal information
- Full name: Julio César Pinheiro García
- Date of birth: August 22, 1976 (age 50)
- Place of birth: Itapeva, São Paulo, Brazil
- Height: 1.75 m (5 ft 9 in)
- Position: Midfielder

Senior career*
Years	Team	Apps	(Gls)
1996–1997	Celaya		
1998	Logroñés		
1998–2000	Celaya		
2000–2003	Cruz Azul	94	
2003	Osasuna		
2004	Atlas	22	
2005	Ponte Preta		
2005	Monterrey		
2006	Universidad Nacional		
2006	Kyoto Purple Sanga		
- * Club domestic league appearances and goals

Julio César Pinheiro García (born August 22, 1976) is a Brazilian former professional footballer who last played for Kyoto Purple Sanga in the J1 League. He also played for Atletico Celaya (his first team in Mexico) CF Monterrey, Cruz Azul, UNAM Pumas in Mexico CA Osasuna and CD Logrones in Spain.

He is a Mexican naturalized citizen.

== Club statistics ==
Club performance			League	
Season	Club	League	Apps	Goals
Mexico			League	
1996/97	Celaya	Primera División	16	3
1997/98	Celaya	Primera División	17	1
Spain			League	
1997/98	Logroñés	Segunda División	16	0
Mexico			League	
1998/99	Celaya	Primera División	32	3
1999/00	Celaya	Primera División	39	6
2000/01	Cruz Azul	Primera División	34	9
2001/02	Cruz Azul	Primera División	37	9
2002/03	Cruz Azul	Primera División	23	3
Spain			League	
2003/04	Osasuna	La Liga	6	0
Mexico			League	
2003/04	Atlas	Primera División	12	2
Brazil			League	
2005	Ponte Preta	Série A	0	0
Mexico			League	
2005/06	Monterrey	Primera División	22	0
2005/06	Universidad Nacional	Primera División	11	0
Japan			League	
2006	Kyoto Purple Sanga	J1 League	5	0
Country	Mexico		243	36
Country	Spain		22	0
Country	Brazil		0	0
Country	Japan		5	0
Total			270	36
