= José Alberto Hernández =

Mexican footballer (born 1977)

Personal information
- Full name: José Alberto Hernández Rojas
- Date of birth: 6 January 1977 (age 49)
- Place of birth: Chimalhuacán, Estado de Mexico, Mexico
- Height: 1.75 m (5 ft 9 in)
- Position: Midfielder

Team information
- Current team: Cruz Azul Hidalgo
- Number: 57

Senior career*
Years	Team	Apps	(Gls)
1999–2005	Cruz Azul	162	(5)
2005–2006	Necaxa	30	(3)
2006–	Cruz Azul	10	(0)
2007–2008	Monarcas Morelia (loan)	10	(0)
2008–2009	Jaguares (loan)	8	(0)

International career
2001	Mexico	1	(0)
- * Club domestic league appearances and goals as of March 4, 2008

José Alberto Hernández Rojas (born 6 January 1977) is a Mexican footballer. He plays as a midfielder for Cruz Azul Hidalgo.

A versatile player most often used in defensive midfield, he was a part of the Cruz Azul team that reached the final of the Copa Libertadores in 2001. On the strength of that performance, he earned a call to the Mexico national team upon the first appointment of Javier Aguirre as national coach in June 2001. Hernández received his only cap in Aguirre's first match, a 1–0 win over the United States on July 1, 2001.
