= 2012–13 Cruz Azul season =

Cruz Azul
2012–13 season
- President: Guillermo Álvarez Cuevas
- Manager: Guillermo Vázquez
- Stadium: Estadio Azul
- Liga MX: Apertura: 6th (Quarter-finals); Clausura: 5th (Runners-up)
- Copa MX: Apertura: Group stage Clausura: Winners
- Top goalscorer: League: Mariano Pavone (3); All: Javier Orozco (4)
- Highest home attendance: 31,118 vs. GDL (4/AUG/2012)
- Lowest home attendance: 8,000 vs. EAL (21/AUG/2012)
- Average home league attendance: 20,654
Home colours	Away colours	Third colours

The 2012–13 Cruz Azul Fútbol Club season was the 86th season in the football club's history and the 48th consecutive season in the top flight of Mexican football. The season is split into four tournaments—the Torneo Apertura, Torneo Clausura, Cup Apertura and the Cup Clausura.

== Club ==
=== Personnel ===
Position	Staff
Chairman	Vacant
Sports Manager	Vacant

=== Coaching staff ===
Position	Staff
Head Coach	(Mexico) Guillermo Vázquez
Assistant Coach	(Mexico) José Luis Salgado
Assistant Coach	(Mexico) Carlos Gutiérrez
Assistant Coach	(Peru) Juan Reynoso
Goalkeeping Coach	(Mexico) Carlos Pérez
Team doctor	(Mexico) Alfonso Jiménez
Physical & Fitness coach	(Mexico) Ricardo Gómez
Physiotherapist	(Mexico) Ernesto Rubio
Masseur	(Mexico) Antonio Ortiz
Masseur	(Mexico) Alejandro Ramírez
Stagehand	(Mexico) Pablo Coria
Stagehand	(Mexico) José Luis Coria
Stagehand	(Mexico) Silverio Rivera

Source: [ Technical Staff]

=== Current kit ===
Provider: (England) Umbro.
Sponsors: (Mexico) Cemento Cruz Azul, (United States) Coca-Cola, (Mexico) Telcel, (Mexico) Tecate, (Mexico) Volaris.

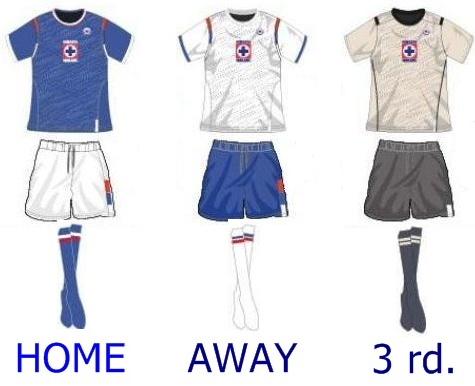

== Current squad ==
As of June 2012: Listed on the official website of Cruz Azul.

Note: Flags indicate national team as defined under FIFA eligibility rules; some limited exceptions apply. Players may hold more than one non-FIFA nationality.

No.	Pos.	Nation	Player
1	GK	MEX	José de Jesús Corona
2	DF	MEX	Fausto Pinto
3	DF	MEX	Néstor Araujo
4	DF	MEX	Julio César Domínguez (vice-captain)
5	DF	MEX	Alejandro Castro
6	MF	MEX	Gerardo Torrado (captain)
7	MF	MEX	Javier Aquino
8	MF	MEX	Israel Castro
19	FW	MEX	Omar Bravo
10	MF	ARG	Christian Giménez (3rd vice-captain)
11	FW	MEX	Alejandro Vela

No.	Pos.	Nation	Player
14	DF	COL	Luis Amaranto Perea
15	DF	MEX	Gerardo Flores
16	DF	MEX	Jair Pereira
17	MF	MEX	Pablo Barrera
18	MF	BRA	Francinilson Meirelles
20	FW	ARG	Mariano Pavone
21	MF	MEX	Héctor Gutiérrez
22	DF	MEX	Adrián Cortés
25	GK	MEX	Yosgart Gutiérrez (2nd vice-captain)
27	FW	MEX	Javier Orozco
28	DF	MEX	Rogelio Chávez

=== From youth system ===
Note: Flags indicate national team as defined under FIFA eligibility rules; some limited exceptions apply. Players may hold more than one non-FIFA nationality.

No.	Pos.	Nation	Player
12	GK	MEX	Guillermo Allison
19	FW	MEX	Marco Antonio Angúlo
24	MF	MEX	Luis Alanís
61	GK	MEX	Gibrán Lajud
72	MF	MEX	Luis Fernando Carrasco
73	MF	MEX	Iñaki Domínguez
74	MF	MEX	Kevin Varela
75	FW	MEX	Martín Galván

No.	Pos.	Nation	Player
76	FW	MEX	Héctor Acevedo
77	DF	MEX	Francisco Flores
78	MF	MEX	Raúl Antonio Vidal
79	DF	MEX	Alan Vidal
84	DF	MEX	Juan Carlos García
86	DF	MEX	Iván Ricardo Pérez
91	MF	MEX	Diego Israel Martínez
96	DF	MEX	Jesús Alberto Lara

== Transfers ==
=== Summer ===
==== In and loan ====
No.	Pos.	Nat.	Name	Age	EU	Moving from	Type	Transfer window	Ends	Transfer fee	Source
5	DF	(Mexico)	Alejandro Castro	25	Non-EU	Estudiantes Tecos	Loan Return	Summer	Undisclosed	Youth system	diarioportal.com
28	DF	(Mexico)	Rogelio Chávez	27	Non-EU	Atlas	Loan Return	Summer	Undisclosed	Youth system	diarioportal.com
20	FW	(Argentina)	Mariano Pavone	30	EU	Lanús (Argentina)	Transfer	Summer	2015	Undisclosed	ElUniversal.com.mx
14	DF	(Colombia)	Luis Amaranto Perea	33	EU	Atlético Madrid (Spain)	Transfer	Summer	2014	Undisclosed	Goal.com
17	MF	(Mexico)	Pablo Barrera	25	Non-EU	West Ham United (England)	Transfer	Summer	2015	Undisclosed	Excelsior.com

==== Out and loan ====
No.	Pos.	Nat.	Name	Age	EU	Moving to	Type	Transfer window	Transfer fee	Source
	DF	(Mexico)	Horacio Cervantes		Non-EU	Necaxa	Loan	Summer	Undisclosed	
	MF	(Mexico)	Jaime Lozano		Non-EU	UNAM	Transfer	Summer	Undisclosed	
30	FW	(Argentina)	Emanuel Villa		Non-EU	UNAM	Transfer	Summer	Undisclosed	
3	DF	(Chile)	Waldo Ponce		Non-EU	Universidad de Chile	Loan	Summer	Undisclosed	
9	FW	(Colombia)	Edixon Perea		Non-EU	Changchun Yatai (China)	Loan	Summer	Undisclosed	

=== Winter ===
==== In and loan ====
No.	Pos.	Nat.	Name	Age	EU	Moving from	Type	Transfer window	Ends	Transfer fee	Source

==== Out and loan ====
No.	Pos.	Nat.	Name	Age	EU	Moving to	Type	Transfer window	Transfer fee	Source

== Competitions ==
Cruz Azul play four different tournaments in the 2012–13 season are Apertura 2012, Clausura 2013, Apertura 2012 Copa Mexico and Clausura 2013 Copa Mexico.

=== Overall ===
Competition	Started round	Position	First match	Last match
Apertura 2012	—N/a	6th	July 21	—
Copa Apertura	Group Stage	2nd	July 25	—
Copa Clausura	—N/a	—	—	—
Clausura 2013	—N/a	—	—	—

=== Results by opponent (league) ===
Team	Results		Points
Team	Home	Away	Points
América			
Atlante			
Atlas			
Guadalajara	0 – 0		1
Chiapas			
León	1 – 1		1
Monterrey			
Morelia	0 – 0		1
Pachuca			
Puebla		0 – 1	3
Querétaro			
San Luis		1 – 2	3
Santos Laguna			
Tijuana			
Toluca			
UANL			
UNAM		0 – 1	3
Total Points
Apertura	3	9	12
Clausura			
Season	3	9	12

Source:Cruz Azul Matches at soccerway.com 2012–13 Liga MX season article

== Competitions statistics ==
=== 2012 Torneo Apertura ===
Kickoff times are in CTZ or CST=UTC−06:00 and DST=UTC−05:00.

==== Pre-Season Summer 2012 ====
Win Draw Loss

June 23, 2012 Friendly	Cruz Azul	2 – 0	Altamira	Mexico City, Mexico
		[ Report] Live TV:		Stadium: La Noria

June 28, 2012 Friendly (Copa Banorte)	León	2 – 0	Cruz Azul	León, Guanajuato, Mexico
		[ Report] Live TV:		Stadium: Estadio Nou Camp

June 30, 2012 Friendly (Copa Banorte)	Pachuca	1 – 1 (3 – 1 p)	Cruz Azul	León, Guanajuato, Mexico
		[ Report] Live TV:		Stadium: Estadio Nou Camp

July 7, 2012 Friendly	Cruz Azul	0 – 1	Queretaro	Jasso, Hidalgo, Hidalgo, Mexico
		[ Report] Live TV:		Stadium: Estadio 10 de Diciembre

July 11, 2012 Friendly	America	1 – 2	Cruz Azul	Dallas, Texas, United States
		[ Report] Live TV:		Stadium: Cotton Bowl

July 14, 2012 Friendly	Cruz Azul	2 – 1	Irapuato	Mexico City, Mexico
		[ Report] Live TV:		Stadium: La Noria

September 8, 2012 Friendly	La Equidad	1-3	Cruz Azul	Bogotà, Colombia
		[ Report] Live TV:		Stadium: Estadio Metropolitano de Techo

==== Regular phase ====
Win Draw Loss

July 21, 2012 Round 1	Cruz Azul	0 – 0	Morelia	Mexico City, Mexico
17:00 DST	Perea (yellow card) 16'; Castro (yellow card) 62'; Maranhão (yellow card) 79'	Report; Live TV: Canal Azteca 13; ESPN Latin America	(yellow card) 29' Romero	Stadium: Estadio Azul; Attendance: 25,328 (Approx. unofficial); Referee: (Mexico City) Luis Enrique Santander

July 28, 2012 Round 2	San Luis	1 – 2	Cruz Azul	San Luis, San Luis Potosí, Mexico
21:00 DST	Cadavid (yellow card) 44'; Orozco (yellow card) 54'; Tréllez (yellow card) 77'	Report; Live TV: Canal 9 Galavisión	16' Pavone; (yellow card) 29' Castro; 83' Orozco	Stadium: Estadio Alfonso Lastras; Referee: Oscar Macías Romo

August 4, 2012 Round 3	Cruz Azul	0 – 0	Guadalajara	Mexico City, Mexico
17:00 DST	Pavone (yellow card) 45'	Report; Live TV: Canal Azteca 13; ESPN Latin America	(yellow card) 60' Esparza	Stadium: Estadio Azul; Attendance: 30,018; Referee: Fernando Guerrero Ramírez

August 12, 2012 Round 4	Puebla	0 – 1	Cruz Azul	Puebla, Puebla, Mexico
12:00 DST	Beasley (yellow card) 18'; Chávez (yellow card) 32' (red card)	Report; Live TV: Canal Azteca 13; Fox Sports Latinoamerica	(yellow card) 44' Perea; (yellow card) 51' Vela; (yellow card) 65' Barrera; 82' Pavone	Stadium: Estadio Cuauhtémoc; Attendance: 9,996; Referee: Jorge Antonio Pérez

August 17, 2012 Round 5	Cruz Azul	1 – 1	León	Mexico City, Mexico
21:30 DST	Perea (yellow card) 4'; Vela (yellow card) 46'; Barrera 73' (yellow card) 74'; Castro (yellow card) 75'	Report; Live TV: Canal Azteca 13; ESPN Latin America	(yellow card) 3' Vazquez; (yellow card) 31' Hernández; (yellow card) 45' (goal) 69' Montes; (yellow card) 90+1' Matosas (Manager)	Stadium: Estadio Azul; Attendance: 22,877; Referee: Erim Ramírez Ulloa

August 26, 2012 Round 6	UNAM	0 – 1	Cruz Azul	Mexico City, Mexico
12:00 DST		Report; Live TV: Canal de las Estrellas 2 Telemundo	68' Pavone	Stadium: Estadio Olímpico Universitario; Referee: (Michoacán) Francisco Chacón

September 1, 2012 Round 7	Cruz Azul	1-1	Pachuca	Mexico City, Mexico
17:00 DST		[ Report] Live TV:		Stadium: Estadio Azul

September 15, 2012 Round 8	UANL	2-0	Cruz Azul	San Nicolás de los Garza, Nuevo León, Mexico
19:00 DST		[ Report] Live TV:		Stadium: Estadio Universitario

September 22, 2012 Round 9	Cruz Azul	1-1	América	Mexico City, Mexico
17:00 DST		[ Report] Live TV:		Stadium: Estadio Azul

September 28, 2012 Round 10	Chiapas	1-0	Cruz Azul	Tuxtla Gutierrez, Chiapas, Mexico
19:30 DST		[ Report] Live TV:		Stadium: Estadio Victor Manuel Reyna

October 3, 2012 Round 11	Cruz Azul	4-0	Atlante	Mexico City, Mexico
		[ Report] Live TV:		Stadium: Estadio Azul

October 6, 2012 Round 12	Atlas	1-1	Cruz Azul	Guadalajara, Jalisco, Mexico
21:00 DST		[ Report] Live TV:		Stadium: Estadio Jalisco

October 13, 2012 Round 13	Cruz Azul	3-2	Querétaro	Mexico City, Mexico
17:00 DST		[ Report] Live TV:		Stadium: Estadio Azul

October 19, 2012 Round 14	Tijuana	2-2	Cruz Azul	Tijuana, Baja California, Mexico
21:30 DST		[ Report] Live TV:		Stadium: Estadio Caliente

October 27, 2012 Round 15	Cruz Azul	3-0	Toluca	Mexico City, Mexico
17:00 DST		[ Report] Live TV:		Stadium: Estadio Azul

November 2, 2012 Round 16	Santos Laguna	2-1	Cruz Azul	Torreón, Coahuila, Mexico
21:30 DST		[ Report] Live TV:		Stadium: Estadio TSM Corona

November 10, 2012 Round 17	Cruz Azul	1-1	Monterrey	Mexico City, Mexico
17:00 DST		[ Report] Live TV:		Stadium: Estadio Azul

==== General table ====
Pos	Team	Pld	W	D	L	GF	GA	GD	Pts	Qualification
4	América	17	8	7	2	28	15	+13	31	Advance to the Liguilla (Note: The first 8 places in the table qualify for the Playoffs.)
5	Morelia	17	6	9	2	25	16	+9	27	Advance to the Liguilla
6	Cruz Azul	17	6	8	3	22	15	+7	26	Advance to the Liguilla
7	Monterrey	17	5	8	4	23	23	0	23	Advance to the Liguilla and cannot qualify for South American competitions (Note: Guadalajara, Monterrey, Santos Laguna and UANL cannot qualify for the 2013 Copa Libertadores because they are participating in the 2012–13 CONCACAF Champions League competition.)
8	Guadalajara	17	6	5	6	17	17	0	23	Advance to the Liguilla and cannot qualify for South American competitions

Updated to match(es) played on 7 November 2012. Source: MedioTiempo
Rules for classification: 1) points; 2) goal difference; 3) number of goals scored.

=== Copa MX ===
Kickoff times are in CTZ or CST=UTC−06:00 and DST=UTC−05:00.

Win Draw Loss Home Game

==== Group stage ====
Round 1

July 25, 2012 First Leg	Cruz Azul	3 – 0	Neza	Mexico City, Mexico
21:30 DST	Maranhão (yellow card) 17'; Giménez 23' (pen.); García (yellow card) 47'; Lara 52'; Cortés (yellow card) 59'; Angúlo (yellow card) 64'; Orozco 79'	Report; Live TV: ESPN Deportes	(yellow card) 53' Mejía	Stadium: Estadio Azul; Attendance: 15,946 (Approx. unofficial); Referee: César Arturo Ramos

August 1, 2012 Second Leg	Neza	2 – 1 (2 – 4 agg.)	Cruz Azul	Ciudad Nezahualcóyotl, Estado de México, Mexico
21:30 DST	Reyes 8' (yellow card) 42'; Pineda (yellow card) 14'; Mejía 69' (yellow card) 90+2'; Fraga 90+7'	Report; Live TV: ESPN Deportes	5' (yellow card) 20' Orozco; (yellow card) 68' Gutiérrez; (yellow card) 90+7' Cortés	Stadium: Estadio Neza 86; Referee: Arturo Cruz Hurtado

Cruz Azul won the series 4 – 2.
Round 2

August 7, 2012 First Leg	Altamira	0 – 1	Cruz Azul	Altamira, Tamaulipas, Mexico
21:30 DST	Vásquez (yellow card) 16'; Mascareñas (yellow card) 27'; Meza (yellow card) 66'	Report; Live TV: ESPN Deportes	(yellow card) 53' Gutiérrez; (yellow card) 57' Vidal; 67' (pen.) Orozco; (yellow card) 75' Galván; (yellow card) 78' Cortés	Stadium: Estadio Altamira; Attendance: 13,500; Referee: Marco Ortiz

August 21, 2012 Second Leg	Cruz Azul	0 – 0 (1 – 0 agg.)	Altamira	Mexico City, Mexico
21:00 DST	Araujo (yellow card) 4'	Report; Live TV: ESPN Deportes	(yellow card) 68' Samudio; (yellow card) 68' Samudio	Stadium: Estadio Azul; Attendance: 8,000 (Approx. unofficial); Referee: Miguel Ángel Ayala Ramírez

Cruz Azul won the series 1 – 0.
Round 3

August 29, 2012 First Leg	Atlas	v	Cruz Azul	Guadalajara, Jalisco, Mexico
		Report; Live TV: ESPN Deportes		Stadium: Estadio Jalisco; Referee: Miguel Ángel Ortega

September 18, 2012 Second Leg	Cruz Azul	v	Atlas	Mexico City, Mexico
		Report; Live TV: ESPN Deportes		Stadium: Estadio Azul

==== Group table ====
Group 2
Team	Pld	W	D	L	RW	GF	GA	GD	Pts	NEZ	CRA	ALT	ATL
Neza	6	3	1	2	1	7	8	−1	11		2–1	2–1	2–1
Cruz Azul	6	2	2	2	2	6	4	+2	10	3–0		0–0	1–1
Altamira	6	2	2	2	2	6	6	0	10	1–0	0–1		3–2
Atlas	6	1	3	2	1	7	8	−1	7	1–1	1–0	1–1	

Legend: Blue = home team win; Yellow = draw; Red = away team win.

=== Torneo Clausura 2013 ===
Kickoff times are in CTZ or CST=UTC−06:00 and DST=UTC−05:00.

==== Pre-Season Winter 2012 ====
Win Draw Loss

Friendly	v
	[ Report] Live TV:

Friendly	v
	[ Report] Live TV:

Friendly	v
	[ Report] Live TV:

Friendly	v
	[ Report] Live TV:

Friendly	v
	[ Report] Live TV:

Friendly	v
	[ Report] Live TV:

==== Regular phase ====
Win Draw Loss Home Game

2013 Round 1	Morelia	3 - 3	Cruz Azul	Morelia, Michoacán, Mexico
		[ Report] Live TV:		Stadium: Estadio Morelos

2013 Round 2	Cruz Azul	2 - 1	San Luis	Mexico City, Mexico
		[ Report] Live TV:		Stadium: Estadio Azul

2013 Round 3	Guadalajara	1 - 1	Cruz Azul	Zapopan, Jalisco, Mexico
		[ Report] Live TV:		Stadium: Estadio Omnilife

2013 Round 4	Cruz Azul	4 - 0	Puebla	Mexico City, Mexico
		[ Report] Live TV:		Stadium: Estadio Azul

2013 Round 5	León	2 - 2	Cruz Azul	León, Guanajuato, Mexico
		[ Report] Live TV:		Stadium: Estadio Nou Camp

2013 Round 6	Cruz Azul	1 - 1	UNAM	Mexico City, Mexico
		[ Report] Live TV:		Stadium: Estadio Azul

2013 Round 7	Pachuca	2 - 1	Cruz Azul	Pachuca, Hidalgo, Mexico
		[ Report] Live TV:		Stadium: Estadio Hidalgo

2013 Round 8	Cruz Azul	1 - 2	UANL	Mexico City, Mexico
		[ Report] Live TV:		Stadium: Estadio Azul

2013 Round 9	América	3 - 0	Cruz Azul	Mexico City, Mexico
		[ Report] Live TV:		Stadium: Estadio Azteca

2013 Round 10	Cruz Azul	1 - 1	Chiapas	Mexico City, Mexico
		[ Report] Live TV:		Stadium: Estadio Azul

2013 Round 11	Atlante	0 - 3	Cruz Azul	Cancún, Quintana Roo, Mexico
		[ Report] Live TV:		Stadium: Estadio Andres Quintana Roo

2013 Round 12	Cruz Azul	1 - 2	Atlas	Mexico City, Mexico
		[ Report] Live TV:		Stadium: Estadio Azul

2013 Round 13	Querétaro	1 - 2	Cruz Azul	Querétaro, Querétaro, Querétaro, Mexico
		[ Report] Live TV:		Stadium: Estadio Corregidora

2013 Round 14	Cruz Azul	5 - 0	Tijuana	Mexico City, Mexico
		[ Report] Live TV:		Stadium: Estadio Azul

2013 Round 15	Toluca	0 - 2	Cruz Azul	Toluca, Estado de México, Mexico
		[ Report] Live TV:		Stadium: Estadio Nemesio Díez

2013 Round 16	Cruz Azul	1 - 0	Santos Laguna	Mexico City, Mexico
		[ Report] Live TV:		Stadium: Estadio Azul

2013 Round 17	Monterrey	1 - 5	Cruz Azul	Monterrey, Nuevo León, Mexico
		[ Report] Live TV:		Stadium: Estadio Tecnológico

==== General table ====
Pos	Team	Pld	W	D	L	GF	GA	GD	Pts	Qualification
3	Atlas	17	9	5	3	20	13	+7	32	Advance to the Final phase
4	Morelia	17	8	6	3	25	18	+7	30	Advance to the Final phase
5	Cruz Azul	17	8	5	4	35	19	+16	29	Advance to the Final phase
6	Santos Laguna	17	8	5	4	20	13	+7	29	Advance to the Final phase
7	UNAM	17	8	5	4	19	14	+5	29	Advance to the Final phase

Updated to match(es) played on May 4, 2013. Source: www.ligamx.net
Rules for classification: 1) points; 2) goal difference; 3) number of goals scored.

== Squad statistics ==
=== Start formations ===
Qnt	Formation	Match(es)

Last updated: Jun 17
Only competitive matches.

=== Starting XI ===
No.	Pos.	Nat.	Name	MS	Notes
11 starters
	GK				
	LB				
	CB				
	CB				
	RB				
	LM				
	CM				
	CM				
	RM				
	FW				
	FW				
Other starters

Last updated: 17 June 2012
Source: Squad stats and Start formations.
Only competitive matches.
Using the most used start formation.
Ordered by position on pitch (from back right to front left).

- Cruz Azul Starting 11 in their 4-4–2 formation

=== Apps, goals and discipline ===
League = Apertura 2012 & Clausura 2013

Cup = Copa Mexico

Playoffs = Final Phase of the Apertura 2012 & Clausura 2013

Key:
‡ On loan from another club * First appearance(s) for the club

- # = Squad number
- Pos = Playing position
- P = Number of games played
- G = Number of goals scored
- GK = Goalkeeper
- DF = Defender
- MF = Midfielder
- FW = Forward
- = Yellow cards
- = Red cards
- † Permanent player left club during the season
- ¤ Loaned to another club for part or all of season

Correct as of 28 August 2012. Starting appearances are listed first, followed by substitute appearances in parentheses where applicable.

No.	Pos	Name	P	G	P	G	P	G	P	G	A yellow card	A red card	Notes
No.	Pos	Name	League		Cup		Playoffs		Total		Discipline		Notes
1	GK	(Mexico) José de Jesús Corona	2	-1	0	0	0	0	2	-1	0	0	(−) means goals conceded
12	GK	(Mexico) Guillermo Allison	0	0	3	-2	0	0	3*	-2	0	0	(−) means goals conceded
25	GK	(Mexico) Yosgart Gutiérrez	4	-1	1	0	0	0	5	-1	0	0	(−) means goals conceded
61	GK	(Mexico) Gibrán Lajud	0	0	0	0	0	0	0	0	0	0	(−) means goals conceded
2	DF	(Mexico) Fausto Pinto	3	0	3	0	0	0	0	0	0	0	
3	DF	(Mexico) Néstor Araujo	0(1)	0	1	0	0	0	1(1)	0	1	0	
4	DF	(Mexico) Julio César Domínguez	3	0	1	0	0	0	4	0	0	0	
5	DF	(Mexico) Alejandro Castro	6	0	1	0	0	0	7	0	3	0	
14	DF	(Colombia) Luis Amaranto Perea	6	0	0	0	0	0	6*	0	3	0	
15	DF	(Mexico) Gerardo Flores	6	0	0	0	0	0	6	0	0	0	
16	DF	(Mexico) Jair Pereira	0	0	0	0	0	0	0	0	0	0	
22	DF	(Mexico) Adrián Cortés	0	0	4	0	0	0	4	0	3	0	
28	DF	(Mexico) Rogelio Chavez	0	0	4	0	0	0	4	0	0	0	
77	DF	(Mexico) Francisco Flores	0	0	0	0	0	0	0	0	0	0	
79	DF	(Mexico) Alan Emmanuel Vidal	0	0	3(1)	0	0	0	3(1)	0	1	0	
84	DF	(Mexico) Juan Carlos García	0	0	2(1)	0	0	0	2(1)	0	1	0	
86	DF	(Mexico) Iván Pérez	0	0	0	0	0	0	0	0	0	0	
6	MF	(Mexico) Gerardo Torrado	6	0	0(1)	0	0	0	6(1)	0	0	0	
7	MF	(Mexico) Javier Aquino	2	0	0	0	0	0	2	0	0	0	
8	MF	(Mexico) Israel Castro	6	0	0	0	0	0	6	0	0	0	
10	MF	(Argentina) Christian Giménez	0(1)	0	1	1	0	0	1(1)	1	0	0	
17	MF	(Mexico) Pablo Barrera	5(1)	1	0	0	0	0	5(1)	1	2	0	
18	MF	(Brazil) Maranhão	0(5)	0	4	0	0	0	4(5)	0	2	0	
21	MF	(Mexico) Héctor Gutiérrez	0(2)	0	4	0	0	0	4(2)	0	2	0	
24	MF	(Mexico) Luis Alanis	0	0	0	0	0	0	0	0	0	0	
72	MF	(Mexico) Luis Fernando Carrasco	0	0	0	0	0	0	0	0	0	0	
73	MF	(Mexico) Iñaki Domínguez	0	0	0(1)	0	0	0	0(1)	0	0	0	
74	MF	(Mexico) Kevin Varela	0	0	0	0	0	0	0	0	0	0	
78	MF	(Mexico) Raúl Antonio Vidal	0	0	4	0	0	0	4*	0	0	0	
91	MF	(Mexico) Diego Israel Martínez	0	0	0	0	0	0	0	0	0	0	
9	FW	(Mexico) Omar Bravo	5(1)	0	1	0	0	0	6(1)	0	0	0	
11	FW	(Mexico) Alejandro Vela	6	0	0	0	0	0	6*	0	2	0	
19	FW	(Mexico) Marco Antonio Angúlo	0	0	0(3)	0	0	0	0(3)	0	1	0	
20	FW	(Argentina) Mariano Pavone	6	3	0	0	0	0	0	3	1	0	
27	FW	(Mexico) Javier Orozco	0(6)	1	4	3	0	0	4(6)	4	1	0	
75	FW	(Mexico) Martín Galván	0	0	1(2)	0	0	0	1(2)	0	1	0	
76	FW	(Mexico) Héctor Acevedo	0	0	0(1)	0	0	0	0(1)*	0	0	0	
96	FW	(Mexico) Jesús Lara	0	0	2(2)	1	0	0	2(2)*	1	0	0	

=== Overall statistics team ===
	Total	Home	Away
Games played	0	0	0
Games won	0	0	0
Games drawn	0	0	0
Games lost	0	0	0
Biggest win (Apertura)			
Biggest win (Cup Apertura)			
Biggest win (Clausura)			
Biggest win (Cup Clausura)			
Biggest lose (Apertura)			
Biggest lose (Cup Apertura)			
Biggest lose (Clausura)			
Biggest lose (Cup Clausura)			
Goals scored	0	0	0
Goals conceded	0	0	0
Goal difference	0	0	0
Average GF per game	0	0	0
Average GA per game	0	0	0
Most Game Started	0		
Most appearances	0		
Top scorer	0		
Points	0/0 (0%)	0/0 (0%)	0/0 (0%)
Winning rate	0/0 (0%)	0/0 (0%)	0/0 (0%)

Last updated: June 17, 2012
Source: Competitive matches

== Goalscorers ==
Position	Nation	Name	Apertura 2012	Copa Mexico AP	Clausura 2013	Copa Mexico CL	Total
1	—N/a	—N/a	0	0	0	0	0
2	—N/a	—N/a	0	0	0	0	0
3	—N/a	—N/a	0	0	0	0	0
TOTAL	—N/a	—N/a	0	0	0	0	0

=== Goal minutes ===
Updated to games played on 2 June.

1'–15'	16'–30'	31'–HT	46'–60'	61'–75'	76'–FT	Extra time	"Total"
0	0	0	0	0	0	0	0

== Results ==
=== Apertura 2012 ===
==== Results summary ====
Overall								Home						Away					
Pld	W	D	L	GF	GA	GD	Pts	W	D	L	GF	GA	GD	W	D	L	GF	GA	GD
6	3	3	0	5	2	+3	12	0	3	0	1	1	0	3	0	0	4	1	+3

Last updated: Aug 28.
Source: Competitive Matches

==== Results by round ====
Round	1	2	3	4	5	6	7	8	9	10	11	12	13	14	15	16	17
Ground	H	A	H	A	H	A	H	A	H	A	H	A	H	A	H	A	H
Result	D	W	D	W	D	W											
Position	8	8	9	4	6	4											

Updated to match(es) played on Aug 28. Source: Competitive Matches
A = Away; H = Home; W = Win; D = Draw; L = Loss

=== Copa Apertura 2012 ===
==== Results summary ====
Overall								Home						Away					
Pld	W	D	L	GF	GA	GD	Pts	W	D	L	GF	GA	GD	W	D	L	GF	GA	GD
4	2	1	1	5	2	+3	7	1	1	0	3	0	+3	1	0	1	2	2	0

Last updated: Aug 28.
Source: Competitive Matches

==== Results by round ====
Round	1	2	3	4	5	6
Ground	H	A	A	H	A	H
Result	W	L	W	D		
Position	1	1	1	1		

Updated to match(es) played on Aug 28. Source: Competitive Matches
A = Away; H = Home; W = Win; D = Draw; L = Loss

=== Clausura 2013 ===
==== Results summary ====
Overall								Home						Away					
Pld	W	D	L	GF	GA	GD	Pts	W	D	L	GF	GA	GD	W	D	L	GF	GA	GD
0	0	0	0	0	0	0	0	0	0	0	0	0	0	0	0	0	0	0	0

Last updated: Jun 17.
Source: Competitive Matches

==== Results by round ====
Round	1	2	3	4	5	6	7	8	9	10	11	12	13	14	15	16	17
Ground																	
Result																	
Position																	

Updated to match(es) played on Jun 17. Source: Competitive Matches
A = Away; H = Home; W = Win; D = Draw; L = Loss

== IFFHS ranking ==
Cruz Azul position on the Club World Ranking during the 2012–13 season, according to IFFHS.

Month	Position	Points
July	82	127.5
August	TBD	TBD
September	TBD	TBD
October	TBD	TBD
November	TBD	TBD
December	TBD	TBD
January	TBD	TBD
February	TBD	TBD
March	TBD	TBD
April	TBD	TBD
May	TBD	TBD
June		

Last updated: Aug 28, 2012.
Source: IFFHS
