= 2011–12 Cruz Azul season =

Cruz Azul
2011–12 season
- President: Guillermo Álvarez Cuevas
- Manager: Enrique Meza
- Stadium: Estadio Azul
- Primera División: Apertura: 2nd (Quarter-finals); Clausura: 9th (Did not qualify)
- Copa Libertadores: Round of 16
- Top goalscorer: League: Emanuel Villa (14); All: Emanuel Villa (15)
- Highest home attendance: 35,161 vs. GDL (24/SEP/2011), JAG (4/FEB/2012) & LIB (1/MAY/2012)
- Lowest home attendance: 18,000 vs. PUE (08/OCT/2011)
- Average home league attendance: 27,191
Home colours	Away colours	Third colours

The 2011–12 Deportivo Cruz Azul season was the 85th season in the football club's history and the 47th consecutive season in the top flight of Mexican football. The season is split into two tournaments—the Torneo Apertura and the Torneo Clausura—each with identical formats and each contested by the same eighteen teams. Cruz Azul began their season on July 23, 2011. Cruz Azul played their homes games on Saturdays at 17:00 hours local time.

== Club ==
=== Personnel ===
Position	Staff
Chairman	(Mexico) Guillermo Álvarez Cuevas
Sports Manager	(Chile) Alberto Quintano

=== Coaching staff ===
Position	Staff
Head Coach	(Mexico) Enrique Meza
Assistant Coach	(Mexico) Eugenio Villazón
Assistant Coach	(Mexico) Jorge Garcia
Goalkeeping Coach	(Mexico) Carlos Pérez
Team doctor	(Mexico) Alfonso Jiménez
Physical & Fitness coach	(Uruguay) Daniel Ipata
Physiotherapist	(Mexico) Ernesto Rubio
Masseur	(Mexico) Antonio Ortiz
Masseur	(Mexico) Alejandro Ramírez
Stagehand	(Mexico) Pablo Coria
Stagehand	(Mexico) José Luis Coria
Stagehand	(Mexico) Silverio Rivera

Source: Technical Staff

=== Current Kit ===
Provider: (England) Umbro.
Sponsors: (Mexico) Cemento Cruz Azul, (United States) Coca-Cola, (Mexico) Telcel, (Mexico) Tecate, (Mexico) Volaris.

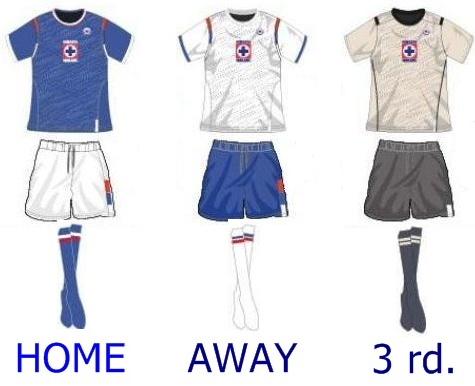

== Current squad ==
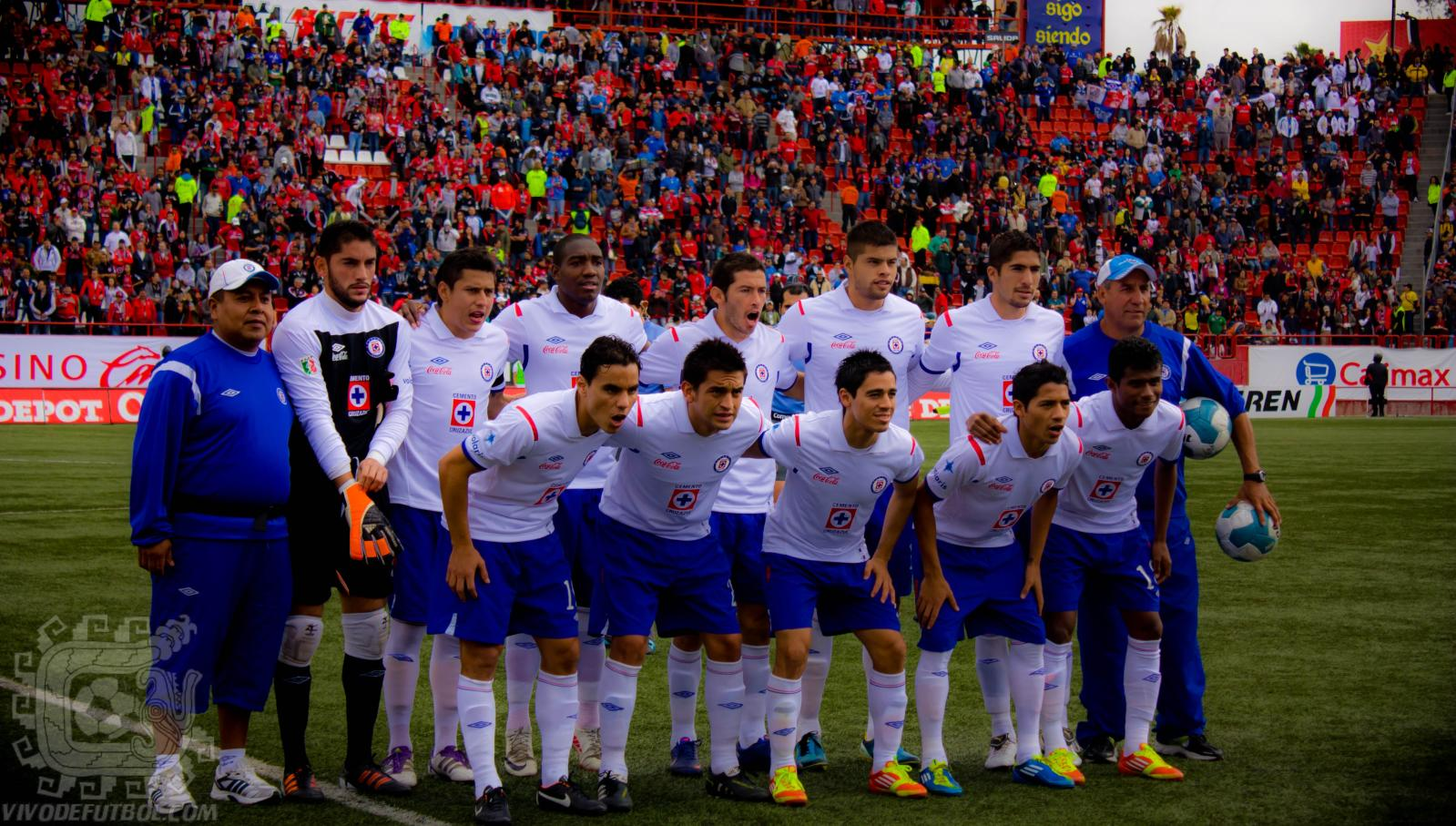
Cruz Azul in Clausura 2012

As of January 2011: Listed on the official website of Cruz Azul.

Note: Flags indicate national team as defined under FIFA eligibility rules; some limited exceptions apply. Players may hold more than one non-FIFA nationality.

No.	Pos.	Nation	Player
1	GK	MEX	José de Jesús Corona
2	DF	MEX	Fausto Pinto
3	DF	CHI	Waldo Ponce
4	DF	MEX	Julio César Domínguez (vice-captain)
6	MF	MEX	Gerardo Torrado (captain)
7	MF	MEX	Javier Aquino
8	MF	MEX	Israel Castro
9	FW	COL	Edixon Perea
10	FW	ARG	Christian Giménez
11	FW	MEX	Alejandro Vela

No.	Pos.	Nation	Player
14	DF	MEX	Néstor Araujo
15	MF	MEX	Gerardo Flores
18	MF	BRA	Francinilson Meirelles
19	FW	MEX	Omar Bravo
21	MF	MEX	Héctor Gutiérrez
22	MF	MEX	Adrián Cortés
25	GK	MEX	Yosgart Gutiérrez (2nd vice-captain)
27	FW	MEX	Javier Orozco
30	FW	ARG	Emanuel Villa

=== From youth system ===
Note: Flags indicate national team as defined under FIFA eligibility rules; some limited exceptions apply. Players may hold more than one non-FIFA nationality.

No.	Pos.	Nation	Player
12	GK	MEX	Guillermo Allison
16	DF	MEX	Jair Pereira
17	DF	MEX	Manuel Mariaca
20	GK	MEX	Javier Caso
24	MF	MEX	Luis Alanis
61	GK	MEX	Gibrán Lajud

No.	Pos.	Nation	Player
64	DF	MEX	Alan Vidal
70	MF	MEX	Diego Israel Martínez
73	MF	MEX	Luis Fernando Carrasco
90	FW	MEX	Marco Antonio Angúlo
104	DF	MEX	Francisco Flores
106	MF	MEX	Iñaki Domínguez

== Transfers ==
=== Summer ===
==== In and Loan ====
No.	Pos.	Nat.	Name	Age	EU	Moving from	Type	Transfer window	Ends	Transfer fee	Source
3	DF	(Mexico)	Jair Pereira	24	Non-EU	Cruz Azul Hidalgo	Transfer	Summer	Undisclosed	Youth system	Diario.com.mx
16	DF	(Mexico)	Manuel Mariaca	25	Non-EU	Cruz Azul Hidalgo	Transfer	Summer	Undisclosed	Youth system	Diario.com.mx
8	MF	(Mexico)	Israel Castro	30	Non-EU	UNAM	Transfer	Summer	Undisclosed	Undisclosed	Goal.com
15	DF	(Mexico)	Gerardo Flores	25	Non-EU	Atlas	Transfer	Summer	Undisclosed	Undisclosed	RECORD.com.mx
9	FW	(Colombia)	Edixon Perea	27	Non-EU	Las Palmas (Spain)	Transfer	Summer	Undisclosed	Undisclosed	Cruz-Azul.com.mx

==== Out and Loan ====
No.	Pos.	Nat.	Name	Age	EU	Moving to	Type	Transfer window	Transfer fee	Source
15	DF	(Mexico)	Horacio Cervantes		Non-EU	Pachuca	Loan	Summer	Undisclosed	
16	DF	(Mexico)	Rogelio Chávez		Non-EU	Pachuca	Loan	Summer	Undisclosed	
3	MF	(Uruguay)	Marcelo Palau		Non-EU	Guaraní (Paraguay)	Loan	Summer	Undisclosed	
8	MF	(Mexico)	Gonzalo Pineda		Non-EU	Puebla	Return Loan	Summer	Undisclosed	
9	FW	(Mexico)	Isaac Romo		Non-EU	Puebla	Loan	Summer	Undisclosed	

=== Winter ===
==== In and Loan ====
No.	Pos.	Nat.	Name	Age	EU	Moving from	Type	Transfer window	Ends	Transfer fee	Source
61	GK	(Mexico)	Gibrán Lajud	17	Non-EU	Youth system	Promoted	Winter	Undisclosed	Youth system	Cruz-Azul.com.mx
73	MF	(Mexico)	Luis Fernando Carrasco	19	Non-EU	Youth system	Promoted	Winter	Undisclosed	Youth system	Cruz-Azul.com.mx
104	DF	(Mexico)	Francisco Flores	17	Non-EU	Youth system	Promoted	Winter	Undisclosed	Youth system	Cruz-Azul.com.mx
105	MF	(Mexico)	Diego Israel Martínez	18	Non-EU	Youth system	Promoted	Winter	Undisclosed	Youth system	Cruz-Azul.com.mx
106	MF	(Mexico)	Iñaki Domínguez	17	Non-EU	Youth system	Promoted	Winter	Undisclosed	Youth system	Cruz-Azul.com.mx
19	FW	(Mexico)	Omar Bravo	31	Non-EU	Sporting Kansas City (United States)	Transfer	Winter	2014	Undisclosed	SportingKC.com
18	MF	(Brazil)	Francinilson Meirelles	21	Non-EU	Bahia (Brazil)	Transfer	Winter	2015	$1.5M	El Universal

==== Out and Loan ====
No.	Pos.	Nat.	Name	Age	EU	Moving to	Type	Transfer window	Transfer fee	Source
18	MF	(Mexico)	César Villaluz	23	Non-EU	San Luis	Transfer	Winter	Undisclosed	MedioTiempo.com
5	DF	(Mexico)	Alejandro Castro	24	Non-EU	Estudiantes Tecos	Loan	Winter	Undisclosed	Cruz-Azul.com.mx
13	MF	(Mexico)	Allam Bello	23	Non-EU	Neza FC	Loan	Winter	Undisclosed	Terra Mexico
19	MF	(Chile)	Hugo Droguett	29	Non-EU	Jeonbuk Hyundai Motors (South Korea)	Loan	Winter	Undisclosed	Goal.com

== Competitions ==
Cruz Azul play three different tournaments in the 2011–12 season are Apertura 2011, Clausura 2012 and Copa Libertadores.

=== Overall ===
Competition	Started round	Current position / round	Final position / round	First match	Last match
Apertura 2011	—N/a	—	2^{nd.}/Quarter-finals	July 23	November 26
Clausura 2012	—N/a	—	9^{th.}/17	January 7	April 29
Copa Libertadores	Group Stage	knockout stage	TBD	February 8	TBD

=== Results by opponent (league) ===
Team	Results		Points
Team	Home	Away	Points
América	3 – 1	2 – 2	4
Atlante	2 – 1	2 – 2	4
Atlas	2 – 1	0 – 2	6
Estudiantes Tecos	5 – 2	0 – 2	6
Guadalajara	1 – 1	2 – 1	1
Chiapas	2 – 0	1 – 1	4
Monterrey	4 – 3	1 – 2	6
Morelia	0 – 1	2 – 0	0
Pachuca	1 – 1	1 – 0	1
Puebla	2 – 0	1 – 1	4
Querétaro	1 – 2	1 – 0	0
San Luis	3 – 1	1 – 1	4
Santos Laguna	0 – 1	1 – 0	0
Tijuana	2 – 1	0 – 0	4
Toluca	0 – 0	0 – 3	4
UANL	1 – 1	1 – 1	2
UNAM	1 – 1	1 – 2	4
Total Points
Apertura	17	12	29
Clausura	15	10	25
Season	32	22	54

Source:Cruz Azul Matches at soccerway.com 2011–12 Primera División de México season article

== Competitions statistics ==
=== Torneo Apertura 2011 ===
Kickoff times are in CTZ or CST=UTC−06:00 and DST=UTC−05:00.

==== Pre-Season Summer 2011 ====
Win Draw Loss

July 2, 2011 Friendly	Cruz Azul	0 – 0	Lobos BUAP	Mexico City, Mexico
11:00 DST		[ Report] Live TV:		Stadium: La Noria

July 7, 2011 Friendly	Cruz Azul	4 – 2	Pumas Morelos	Mexico City, Mexico
11:00 DST	Cortés 19' (pen.); Orozco 42'; Mendoza 108'; Giménez 120'	[ Report] Live TV:	80' García; 80' Hernández	Stadium: La Noria

July 10, 2011 Friendly	Cruz Azul	1 – 1	Atlas	San Jose, California, United States
19:00 DST	Villa 60'	[ Report] Live TV:	90+2' (pen.) Romero	Stadium: Spartan Stadium

July 13, 2011 Friendly	Cruz Azul	3 – 3	Querétaro	Mexico City, Mexico
11:00 DST	Villa 41'; Flores 60'; Pérez 70'	[ Report] Live TV:	23' Bueno; 66' Rico; 101' Vázquez	Stadium: La Noria

July 16, 2011 Friendly	Cruz Azul	1 – 1	Pachuca	Mexico City, Mexico
11:00 DST	Droguett 30'	[ Report] Live TV:	46' Borja	Stadium: Estadio Azul

Friendly during the season

November 10, 2011 Friendly	Cruz Azul	3 – 0	Pumas Morelos	Mexico City, Mexico
11:00 CST	Vela 13'; Pereira 60', 80'	[ Report] Live TV:		Stadium: Estadio Azul

November 11, 2011 Friendly	Cruz Azul	3 – 3	Cruz Azul Hidalgo	Mexico City, Mexico
11:00 CST	Villaluz 34'; Droguett 48'; Perea 80'	[ Report] Live TV:	38' López; 62', 73' Galván	Stadium: Estadio Azul

==== Regular phase ====
Win Draw Loss

July 23, 2011 Round 1	UANL	1 – 1	Cruz Azul	San Nicolás de los Garza, Nuevo León, Mexico
19:00 DST	Mancilla 37' (yellow card) 43'; Torres Nilo (yellow card) 43'	Report; Live TV: Canal 9 Galavisión	(yellow card) 16' Pinto; 19' Aquino; (yellow card) 22' Flores; (yellow card) 49' Ponce	Stadium: Estadio Universitario; Referee: (Jalisco) Paul Delgadillo

July 30, 2011 Round 2	Cruz Azul	2 – 1	Atlas	Mexico City, Mexico
17:00 DST	Ponce (yellow card) 38'; Cortés 46'; Orozco (yellow card) 49'; Aquino (yellow card) 59'; Villa 71'	Report; Live TV: Canal Azteca 13; ESPN Latin America	(yellow card) 12' Arreola; 32' Rodríguez; (yellow card) 38' Welcome; (yellow card) 38' Vidrio	Stadium: Estadio Azul; Attendance: 35,000 (Approx. unofficial); Referee: (Mexico City) Fernando Guerrero Ramírez

August 3, 2011 Round 3	Pachuca	1 – 0	Cruz Azul	Pachuca, Hidalgo, Mexico
20:30 DST	Ayoví 86'	Report; Live TV: Canal Azteca 7	(yellow card) 66' Gutiérrez	Stadium: Estadio Hidalgo; Referee: (Aguascalientes) Oscar Macías Romo

August 6, 2011 Round 4	Cruz Azul	2 – 1	Atlante	Mexico City, Mexico
16:00 DST	Villaluz (yellow card) 32'; Torrado (yellow card) 40'; Villa 44'; Orozco 47'; Pinto (yellow card) 89'	Report; Live TV: Azteca América; SKY Sports; ESPN Latin America	55' Maldonado; (yellow card) 90+1' Amione	Stadium: Estadio Azul; Attendance: 20,000 (Approx. unofficial); Referee: (Sinaloa) Jesús Morales Bojorquez

August 13, 2011 Round 5	Chiapas	1 – 1	Cruz Azul	Tuxtla Gutierrez, Chiapas, Mexico
17:30 DST	Rodríguez (yellow card) 33'; Razo (yellow card) 40'; Fuentes 58' (yellow card) 66'; Hernández (yellow card) 61'	Report; Live TV: Canal Azteca 13	5' (o.g.) Chávez; (yellow card) 53' Villa; (yellow card) 56' I. Castro; (yellow card) 73' A. Castro	Stadium: Estadio Victor Manuel Reyna; Referee: (Mexico City) Miguel Ayala Ramírez

August 20, 2011 Round 6	Cruz Azul	2 – 1	Tijuana	Mexico City, Mexico
16:00 DST	Perea (yellow card) 14' (goal) 48'; Ponce (yellow card) 45'; Pinto (yellow card) 45'; Villa (yellow card) 45' (yellow-red card) 77' (goal) 67'	Report; Live TV: Azteca América; SKY Sports; ESPN Latin America	(yellow card) 15' (goal) 22' Moreno	Stadium: Estadio Azul; Attendance: 22,500 (Approx. unofficial); Referee: (Mexico City) José Alfredo Peñaloza

August 28, 2011 Round 7	UNAM	1 – 2	Cruz Azul	Mexico City, Mexico
12:00 DST	Bravo 22' de Buen (yellow card) 55'; Fuentes (red card) 58'	Report; Live TV: Canal de las Estrellas 2 Telemundo	17' Flores; (yellow card) 52' Domínguez; (yellow card) 74' Torrado; 75' Cortés	Stadium: Estadio Olímpico Universitario; Referee: (Mexico City) Fernando Guerrero Ramírez

September 10, 2011 Round 8	Cruz Azul	0 – 1	Morelia	Mexico City, Mexico
17:00 DST		Report; Live TV: Canal Azteca 13; ESPN Latin America	(yellow card) 60' Gastélum; 90+1' (yellow card) 90+1' Rojas	Stadium: Estadio Azul; Attendance: 20,000 (Approx. unofficial); Referee: (Veracruz) Jorge Pérez Durán

September 17, 2011 Round 9	Monterrey	1 – 2	Cruz Azul	Monterrey, Nuevo León, Mexico
17:00 DST	Delgado 10'; S. Pérez (yellow card) 21'; L. Pérez (yellow card) 25'; Basanta (yellow card) 60' de Nigris (yellow card) 67' (red card) 79'	Report; Live TV: Canal 9 Galavisión; Telemundo	4' Villaluz; (yellow card) 34' Araujo; 50' Perea; (yellow card) 77' Pinto; (yellow card) 82' Giménez	Stadium: Estadio Tecnológico; Referee: (Mexico City) Jorge Isaac Rojas

September 24, 2011 Round 10	Cruz Azul	1 – 1	Guadalajara	Mexico City, Mexico
17:00 DST	Perea 62'; W. Ponce (yellow card) 70'; Torrado (yellow card) 75'; Pinto (yellow card) 89'	Report; Live TV: Canal Azteca 13; ESPN Latin America	34' Arellano; (yellow card) 43' Sánchez; (yellow card) 50' (yellow-red card) 52' M. Ponce	Stadium: Estadio Azul; Attendance: 35,161 (Approx. unofficial); Referee: (Michoacán) Francisco Chacón Gutiérrez

October 1, 2011 Round 11	Santos Laguna	1 – 0	Cruz Azul	Torreón, Coahuila, Mexico
19:00 DST	Peralta 21' (yellow card) 90+2'	Report; Live TV: Canal Azteca 13; ESPN Latin America; Fox Deportes		Stadium: Estadio TSM Corona; Referee: (Mexico City) Marco Antonio Rodríguez

October 8, 2011 Round 12	Cruz Azul	2 – 0	Puebla	Mexico City, Mexico
17:00 DST	Aquino (yellow card) 43'; Giménez (yellow card) 67'; Orozco 73', 89' (yellow card) 73'; Flores (yellow card) 86'	Report; Live TV: Canal Azteca 13; ESPN2	(yellow card) 76' Salinas	Stadium: Estadio Azul; Attendance: 18,000 (Approx. unofficial); Referee: (Sinaloa) César Arturo Ramos

October 15, 2011 Round 13	San Luis	1 – 1	Cruz Azul	San Luis, San Luis Potosí, Mexico
20:45 DST	Torres (yellow card) 26'; Matellán (yellow card) 35'; Moreno 55'; Chiapas (yellow card) 70'	Report; Live TV: Canal 9 Galavisión	83' Perea	Stadium: Estadio Alfonso Lastras; Referee: (Mexico City) Mauricio Morales

October 22, 2011 Round 14	Querétaro	1 – 0	Cruz Azul	Querétaro, Querétaro, Mexico
17:00 DST	Ponce (yellow card) 80'; Bueno 86' (pen.)	Report; Live TV: Canal 4 Foro TV	(yellow card) 14' Giménez; (yellow card) 63' Villaluz; (red card) 66' Orozco; (yellow card) 72' Villa; (yellow card) 85' Domínguez	Stadium: Estadio Corregidora; Referee: (Michoacán) Francisco Chacón Gutiérrez

October 26, 2011 Round 15	Cruz Azul	0 – 0	Toluca	Mexico City, Mexico
19:00 DST	Villa (yellow card) 22'; Giménez (yellow card) 70'	Report; Live TV: Canal Azteca 7 ESPN Latin America	(yellow card) 24' Sinha; (yellow card) 73' Calderón; (yellow card) 78' Gamboa	Stadium: Estadio Azul; Attendance: 23,000 (Approx. unofficial); Referee: (Sinaloa) Jesús Morales Bojorquez

October 30, 2011 Round 16	Estudiantes Tecos	0 – 2	Cruz Azul	Zapopan, Jalisco, Mexico
12:00 CST	Bovaglio (yellow card) 47'; Davino (yellow card) 81'	Report; Live TV: Canal Azteca 13	48' (pen.) Giménez; 61' Villa	Stadium: Estadio Tres de Marzo; Referee: (Mexico City) Fernando Guerrero Ramírez

November 5, 2011 Round 17	Cruz Azul	3 – 1	America	Mexico City, Mexico
17:00 CST	Villa 1', 74'; Torrado (yellow card) 35'; Pinto (yellow card) 58'; Orozco 62'; Ponce (yellow card) 78'	Report; Live TV: Canal Azteca 13; ESPN Latin America; Fox Deportes	(yellow card) 37' Rojas; (yellow card) 43' Valenzuela; (yellow card) 62' (goal) 80' Montenegro; (yellow card) 70' Pimentel	Stadium: Estadio Azul; Attendance: 33,000 (Approx. unofficial); Referee: (Mexico City) Roberto García Orozco

==== General table ====
Pos	Team	Pld	W	D	L	GF	GA	GD	Pts	Qualification
1	Guadalajara	17	8	6	3	24	18	+6	30 (Note: The top 8 score results qualify for the Playoffs.)	2012 Copa Libertadores Second Stage (Note: All 3 teams who qualify for Copa Libertadores will also participate in the Playoffs of this competition.)
2	Cruz Azul	17	8	5	4	21	14	+7	29	2012 Copa Libertadores Second Stage
3	UANL	17	7	7	3	22	13	+9	28	2012 Copa Libertadores First Stage
4	Santos Laguna	17	8	3	6	29	25	+4	27	Cannot qualify for South American competitions (Note: Monterrey, Morelia, Santos Laguna and UNAM cannot qualify for the 2012 Copa Libertadores because they are participating in the 2011-12 CONCACAF Champions League competition.)
5	Chiapas	17	7	5	5	28	23	+5	26	Advance to the Final Phase

Source: FeMexFut
Rules for classification: 1) points; 2) goal difference; 3) number of goals scored.

==== Final phase ====
Quarter-finals

November 19, 2011 First Leg	Morelia	2 – 1	Cruz Azul	Morelia, Michoacán, Mexico
19:00 CST	Gastélum (yellow card) 22'; Márquez L. 77', 85'; Lozano (yellow card) 82'; Lugo (yellow card) 87'	Report; Live TV: Canal Azteca 13	32' Orozco; (yellow card) 53' Corona; (red card) 69' Pinto; (yellow card) 71' Castro; (yellow card) 78' Aquino; (yellow card) 81' Torrado	Stadium: Estadio Morelos; Referee: (Jalisco) Erim Ramírez

November 26, 2011 Second Leg	Cruz Azul	1 – 2 (2 – 4 agg.)	Morelia	Mexico City, Mexico
17:00 CST	Vela 35'; Torrado (yellow card) 40' (yellow-red card) 71'; Giménez (yellow card) 89'	Report; Live TV: Canal Azteca 13; ESPN 2	(yellow card) 1' Huiqui; 16' (yellow card) 23' Sabah; 20' Lugo; (yellow card) 23' Lozano; (yellow card) 64' Aldrete; (yellow card) 90+2' Gastélum	Stadium: Estadio Azul; Attendance: 30,568 (Approx. unofficial); Referee: (Mexico City) Marco Antonio Rodríguez

Morelia won 2–4 in aggregate.

=== Torneo Clausura 2012 ===
Kickoff times are in CTZ or CST=UTC−06:00 and DST=UTC−05:00.

==== Pre-Season Winter 2011 ====
Win Draw Loss

December 17, 2011 Friendly	Cruz Azul	8 – 1	Cruz Azul U-20 & U-17	Mexico City, Mexico
CST	Cortés (?); F. Flores (?); Perea (?); Orozco (?); Villa (?)	[ Report] Live TV:		Stadium: La Noria

December 21, 2011 Friendly	Cruz Azul	2 – 1	Ballenas de Galeana	Mexico City, Mexico
10:00 CST	Arredondo (?); Orozco (?)	[ Report] Live TV:	(?) Torres	Stadium: La Noria

December 23, 2011 Friendly	Cruz Azul	4 – 2	Lobos BUAP	Mexico City, Mexico
10:00 CST	Bravo (?); Perea (?); Giménez (?)	[ Report] Live TV:	(?) Canales	Stadium: La Noria

December 28, 2011 Friendly	Cruz Azul	3 – 0	Veracruz	Mexico City, Mexico
11:00 CST	Giménez 42'; Bravo (?); G. Flores 61'	[ Report] Live TV:		Stadium: Estadio Azul

December 30, 2011 Friendly	Cruz Azul	2 – 1	San Luis	Mexico City, Mexico
11:00 CST	Bravo 10'; Giménez 48'	[ Report] Live TV:	80' Alcántar	Stadium: Estadio Azul

January 4, 2012 Friendly	Cruz Azul	1 – 1	Cruz Azul Hidalgo	Mexico City, Mexico
11:00 CST	Unknown (?)	[ Report] Live TV:	(?) Unknown	Stadium: Estadio Azul

==== Regular phase ====
Win Draw Loss Home Game

January 7, 2012 Round 1	Cruz Azul	1 – 1	UANL	Mexico City, Mexico
17:00 CST	Giménez 6'; Castro (yellow card) 69'	Report; Live TV: Canal Azteca 13; ESPN Latin America	70' Lobos	Stadium: Estadio Azul; Attendance: 29,000 (Approx. unofficial); Referee: (Aguascalientes) Oscar Macías Romo

January 14, 2012 Round 2	Atlas	0 – 2	Cruz Azul	Guadalajara, Jalisco, Mexico
20:45 CST	Zamogilny (yellow card) 1'; Rodríguez (yellow card) 32'; Romero (yellow card) 68'	Report; Live TV: Canal 9 Galavisión	(yellow card) 70' Bravo; 70' Villa; (yellow card) 70' Corona; 70' (pen.) Giménez	Stadium: Estadio Jalisco; Referee: (Jalisco) Paul Delgadillo

January 21, 2012 Round 3	Cruz Azul	1 – 1	Pachuca	Mexico City, Mexico
17:00 CST	Villa 29'; Araujo (yellow card) 44'; Pinto (yellow card) 90+4'	Report; Live TV: Azteca América; SKY Sports; ESPN Latin America	19' Ayoví; (yellow card) 30' Castillo; (yellow card) 44' López; (red card) 44' Cejas; (yellow card) 61' Rodríguez; (yellow card) 63' Torres; (yellow card) 66' Herrera; (yellow card) 79' Arreola; (yellow card) 90+3' Cota	Stadium: Estadio Azul; Attendance: 27,550 (Approx. unofficial); Referee: (Mexico City) Jorge Eduardo Gasso

January 28, 2012 Round 4	Atlante	2 – 2	Cruz Azul	Cancún, Quintana Roo, Mexico
21:00 CST	Guagua (yellow card) 26'; Martínez 67'; Hernández (yellow card) 72'; Arroyo (yellow card) 77'; Cuevas 84'; Mendoza (yellow card) 85'	Report; Live TV: TDN	16', 85' Villa; (yellow card) 28' Gutiérrez; (yellow card) 83' Pereira	Stadium: Estadio Andres Quintana Roo; Referee: (Mexico City) Fernando Guerrero Ramírez

February 4, 2012 Round 5	Cruz Azul	2 – 0	Chiapas	Mexico City, Mexico
17:00 CST	Meireles (yellow card) 44'; Pereira 55' (yellow card) 86'; Araujo (yellow card) 60'; Orozco 61'	Report; Live TV: Canal Azteca 13; ESPN Latin America	(yellow card) 22' Esqueda; (yellow card) 68' Espinoza; (yellow card) 90' Arizala	Stadium: Estadio Azul; Attendance: 35,161 (unofficial); Referee: (Mexico City) Miguel Ángel Ayala Ramírez

February 12, 2012 Round 6	Tijuana	0 – 0	Cruz Azul	Tijuana, Baja California, Mexico
14:00 CST	Gandolfi (yellow card) 4'; Arévalo (yellow card) 64'	Report; Live TV: Canal Azteca 13; Fox Sports + & LAT	(yellow card) 53' Gutiérrez	Stadium: Estadio Caliente; Referee: (Jalisco) Erim Ramírez

February 18, 2012 Round 7	Cruz Azul	1 – 1	UNAM	Mexico City, Mexico
17:00 CST	Maranhão (yellow card) 19'; Giménez (yellow card) 38'; Aquino 65'; Pinto (yellow card) 86'	Report; Live TV: Canal Azteca 13; ESPN 2 Fox Deportes; Azteca América	21' Herrera; (yellow card) 26' García; (yellow card) 53' Cabrera; (yellow card) 90+4' Cacho	Stadium: Estadio Azul; Attendance: 33,000 (unofficial); Referee: (Sinaloa) Jesús Fabricio Morales

February 26, 2012 Round 8	Morelia	2 – 0	Cruz Azul	Morelia, Michoacán, Mexico
12:00 CST	Rojas 35'; Sabah 81'	Report; Live TV: Canal Azteca 13	(yellow card) 39' Domínguez; (yellow card) 60' Giménez	Stadium: Estadio Morelos; Referee: (Aguascalientes) Ricardo Arellano

March 3, 2012 Round 9	Cruz Azul	4 – 3	Monterrey	Mexico City, Mexico
17:00 CST	Giménez 24' (pen.), 53' (yellow card) 46'; Bravo 56'; Villa 82' (yellow card) 82'; Corona (yellow card) 90+2'	Report; Live TV: Canal Azteca 13; ESPN Latin America	19' de Nigris; (yellow card) 48' (goal) 90+4' Basanta; (yellow card) 68' (goal) 69' Suazo; (yellow card) 73' L. Pérez	Stadium: Estadio Azul; Attendance: 27,240 (unofficial); Referee: (Tlaxcala) Antony Zanjuampa

March 10, 2012 Round 10	Guadalajara	2 – 1	Cruz Azul	Zapopan, Jalisco, Mexico
19:00 CST	Sánchez (yellow card) 19'; Reynoso (yellow card) 21' (goal) 90+4' (pen.); Torres 88'; Michel (yellow card) 90+2'	Report; Live TV: Canal 9 Galavisión; TDN; Telemundo	(yellow card) 19' Castro; 22' Villa; (yellow card) 36' Giménez; (yellow card) 44' (red card) 90+1' Araujo; (yellow card) 85' Corona	Stadium: Estadio Omnilife; Referee: (Veracruz) Jorge Pérez Durán

March 17, 2012 Round 11	Cruz Azul	0 – 1	Santos Laguna	Mexico City, Mexico
19:00 CST	Pinto (yellow card) 7'; Ipata(Physical & Fitness coach) (yellow card) 56'	Report; Live TV: Canal Azteca 13; ESPN Latin America	(yellow card) 34' (yellow-red card) 90+2' Galindo; 42' Quintero; (yellow card) 51' Ramírez; (yellow card) 55' Ibáñez; (yellow card) 71' Ochoa; (red card) 73' Armendáriz	Stadium: Estadio Azul; Attendance: 25,560 (unofficial); Referee: (San Luis Potosí) Miguel Ángel Ortega

March 25, 2012 Round 12	Puebla	1 – 1	Cruz Azul	Puebla, Puebla, Mexico
12:00 CST	Rincón (yellow card) 49'; Beasley 54' (yellow card) 65'; Salinas (yellow card) 89'	Report; Live TV: Canal Azteca 13	22' (red card) 84' Villa	Stadium: Estadio Cuauhtémoc; Referee: (Michoacán) Francisco Chacón

March 31, 2012 Round 13	Cruz Azul	3 – 1	San Luis	Mexico City, Mexico
17:00 CST	Bravo 28', 38'; Perea 52'	Report; Live TV: Canal Azteca 13; ESPN Latin America	14' Moreno; (yellow card) 55' Paredes; (yellow card) 66' Velasco	Stadium: Estadio Azul; Attendance: 23,190 (unofficial); Referee: (Guerrero) Miguel Ángel Chacón

April 7, 2012 Round 14	Cruz Azul	1 – 2	Querétaro	Mexico City, Mexico
17:00 DST	Perea 46'	Report; Live TV: Azteca América; SKY Sports; ESPN Latin America	(yellow card) 41' (goal) 90+1' Cortés; 45' Romo; (red card) 81' Comizzo(Coach); (yellow card) 89' Mena	Stadium: Estadio Azul; Attendance: 19,480 (unofficial); Referee: (Mexico City) Roberto García Orozco

April 15, 2012 Round 15	Toluca	0 – 3	Cruz Azul	Toluca, State of Mexico, Mexico
12:00 DST	Sinha (yellow card) 36' de la Torre (yellow card) 78'; Novaretti (red card) 86'	Report; Live TV: Canal de las Estrellas 2 Telemundo	32' Giménez; (yellow card) 44' Pereira; (yellow card) 59' Araujo; (yellow card) 62' (goal) 72' Vela; (yellow card) 70' Aquino; 90+1' Orozco	Stadium: Estadio Nemesio Díez; Referee: (Mexico City) Marco Antonio Rodríguez

April 21, 2012 Round 16	Cruz Azul	5 – 2	Estudiantes Tecos	Mexico City, Mexico
17:00 DST	Vela (yellow card) 27'; Flores 33'; Leaño 43' (o.g.); Perea 62', 72'; Castro 84'	Report; Live TV: Canal Azteca 13; ESPN Latin America	(yellow card) 28' Reyes; (yellow card) 60' Galindo; 78' Sambueza; (yellow card) 88' Pérez; 90' Lillingston	Stadium: Estadio Azul; Attendance: 28,175 (unofficial); Referee: (Mexico City) José Alfredo Peñaloza

April 29, 2012 Round 17	America	2 – 2	Cruz Azul	Mexico City, Mexico
16:00 DST	Aguilar (yellow card) 6'; Benítez 8', 13' (yellow card) 13'; Medina (yellow card) 35'; Reyes (yellow card) 45'; Layún (yellow card) 85'	Report; Live TV: Canal de las Estrellas 2 Telemundo	24' (yellow card) 41' (red card) 87' Pereira; 73' Villa	Stadium: Estadio Azteca; Referee: (Mexico City) Mauricio Morales

==== General table ====
Pos	Team	Pld	W	D	L	GF	GA	GD	Pts	Qualification
7	Tijuana	17	7	7	3	18	11	+7	28	Advances to the Playoffs
8	Chiapas	17	8	3	6	26	20	+6	27	Advances to the Playoffs
9	Cruz Azul	17	6	7	4	29	21	+8	25	
10	Toluca	17	6	4	7	24	27	−3	22	
11	Atlas	17	4	8	5	7	13	−6	20	

Updated to match(es) played on April 29, 2012. Source: MedioTiempo.com
Rules for classification: 1) points; 2) goal difference; 3) number of goals scored.

=== Copa Libertadores ===
Kickoff times are in CTZ or CST=UTC−06:00 and DST=UTC−05:00.

Win Draw Loss Home Game

==== Second stage ====
Group stage

February 8, 2012 Match Day 1	Nacional (Paraguay)	1 – 2	(Mexico) Cruz Azul	Asunción, Paraguay
15:45 CST	Bogado 20'; González (yellow card) 59'; Caniza (yellow card) 83'	Report; Live TV: Fox Deportes; Fox Sports LAT, HD, + & Premium	5', 28' Orozco; (yellow card) 68' Torrado	Stadium: Estadio Dr. Nicolás Léoz; Referee: Néstor Pitana (Argentina)

February 21, 2012 Match Day 2	Cruz Azul (Mexico)	4 – 0	(Venezuela) Deportivo Táchira	Mexico City, Mexico
20:45 CST	Cortés 18' (pen.); Perea 54'; Orozco 78'; Villa 81'	Report; Live TV: Fox Deportes; Fox Sports LAT, HD, + & Premium	(yellow card) 17' Rouga; (yellow card) 23' Clavijo; (yellow card) 27' García; (yellow card) 53' Chacón; (yellow card) 76' Zapata; (yellow card) 83' Arocha	Stadium: Estadio Azul; Attendance: 26,350 (unofficial); Referee: Imer Machado (Colombia)

March 14, 2012 Match Day 3	Cruz Azul (Mexico)	0 – 0	(Brazil) Corinthians	Mexico City, Mexico
19:00 CST		Report; Live TV: Fox Deportes; Fox Sports LAT, HD, + & Premium	(yellow card) 53' Paulinho	Stadium: Estadio Azul; Attendance: 34,000 (unofficial); Referee: Carlos Vera (Ecuador)

March 21, 2012 Match Day 4	Corinthians (Brazil)	1 – 0	(Mexico) Cruz Azul	São Paulo, São Paulo, Brazil
19:00 CST	Danilo 35' (yellow card) 69'; Ralf (yellow card) 42'; Emerson (yellow card) 86'	Report; Live TV: Fox Deportes; Fox Sports LAT, HD, + & Premium	(yellow card) 34' (yellow-red card) 71' Pinto; (yellow card) 44' Mariaca; (yellow card) 90+1' Pereira	Stadium: Estádio do Pacaembu; Referee: Martín Vázquez (Uruguay)

April 3, 2012 Match Day 5	Deportivo Táchira (Venezuela)	1 – 1	(Mexico) Cruz Azul	San Cristóbal, Táchira, Venezuela
20:00 DST	Parra 19'; Fernández (yellow card) 45'	Report; Live TV: Fox Deportes; Fox Sports LAT, HD, + & Premium	(yellow card) 44' Pereira; (yellow card) 58' Flores; (red card) 79' Meza(Coach); 83' Giménez	Stadium: Estadio Polideportivo de Pueblo Nuevo; Referee: Darío Ubriaco (Uruguay)

April 18, 2012 Match Day 6	Cruz Azul (Mexico)	4 – 1	(Paraguay) Nacional	Mexico City, Mexico
19:50 DST	Orozco 20'; Aquino (yellow card) 34'; Maranhão 45'; Gutiérrez (yellow card) 52'; Bravo 65'; Perea 80'	Report; Live TV: Fox Deportes; Fox Sports LAT, HD, + & Premium	(yellow card) 33' Miers; (yellow card) 37' Piris; 43' Cristaldo	Stadium: Estadio Azul; Attendance: 19,294 (unofficial); Referee: Víctor Hugo Carrillo (Peru)

==== Group table ====
Pos	Team	Pld	W	D	L	GF	GA	GD	Pts	COR	CAZ	NAC	TAC
1	(Brazil) Corinthians	6	4	2	0	13	2	+11	14		1–0	2–0	6–0
2	(Mexico) Cruz Azul	6	3	2	1	11	4	+7	11	0–0		4–1	4–0
3	(Paraguay) Nacional	6	1	1	4	6	13	−7	4	1–3	1–2		3–2
4	(Venezuela) Deportivo Táchira	6	0	3	3	4	15	−11	3	1–1	1–1	0–0	

Legend: Blue = home team win; Yellow = draw; Red = away team win.

==== Knockout stages ====
Round of 16

May 1, 2012 First Leg	Cruz Azul (Mexico)	1 – 1	(Paraguay) Libertad	Mexico City, Mexico
21:30 DST	Orozco 26'; Castro (yellow card) 85'	Report; Live TV: Fox Deportes; Fox Sports LAT, HD, + & Premium	(yellow card) 68' Samudio; 70' (yellow card) 84' Velázquez; (yellow card) 86' Muñoz	Stadium: Estadio Azul; Referee: Sergio Pezzotta (Argentina)

May 8, 2012 Second Leg	Libertad (Paraguay)	2 – 0 (3 – 1 agg.)	(Mexico) Cruz Azul	Asunción, Paraguay
20:30 DST	Núñez 9'; Cáceres (yellow card) 42' (goal) 49'; Nasuti (yellow card) 54'	Report; Live TV: Fox Deportes; Fox Sports LAT, HD, + & Premium	Pereira (yellow card) 34'; Flores 49'; Bravo (yellow card) 52'	Stadium: Estadio Dr. Nicolás Léoz; Referee: Leandro Vuaden (Brazil)

Libertad won on points 4–1.

== Squad statistics ==
=== Start formations ===
Qnt	Formation	Match(es)
27	4-4-2	Apertura (9), Clausura (13), Copa Libertadores (5)
5	5-4-1	Apertura (5)
4	5-3-2	Apertura (3), Clausura (1)
3	4-3-3	Apertura (2), Copa Libertadores (1)
1	3-4-3	Copa Libertadores (1)
1	4-4-1-1	Clausura (1)
1	4-1-3-2	Clausura (1)
1	5-2-3	Clausura (1)

Last updated: May 2
Only competitive matches.

=== Starting XI ===
No.	Pos.	Nat.	Name	MS	Notes
11 starters
1	GK	(Mexico)	José de Jesús Corona	32	
2	LB	(Mexico)	Fausto Pinto	32	
14	CB	(Mexico)	Néstor Araujo	28	
3	CB	(Chile)	Waldo Ponce	14	
4	RB	(Mexico)	Julio César Domínguez	30	
11	LM	(Mexico)	Alejandro Vela	13	
6	CM	(Mexico)	Gerardo Torrado	16	
8	CM	(Mexico)	Israel Castro	42	
10	RM	(Argentina)	Christian Giménez	34	
19	FW	(Mexico)	Omar Bravo	19	
30	FW	(Argentina)	Emanuel Villa	29	
Other starters
25	GK	(Mexico)	Yosgart Gutiérrez	11	
3	RB	(Mexico)	Alberto Rodríguez	1	reinforcement only for the cup
16	RB	(Mexico)	Gerardo Flores	21	
104	RB	(Mexico)	Francisco Flores	2	
16	CB	(Mexico)	Jair Pereira	27	
17	CB	(Mexico)	Manuel Mariaca	6	
23	CM	(Mexico)	Héctor Altamirano	1	reinforcement only for the cup
21	CM	(Mexico)	Héctor Gutiérrez	19	
7	RM	(Mexico)	Javier Aquino	13	
22	LB	(Mexico)	Adrián Cortés	23	
18	LM	(Brazil)	Maranhão	9	
27	FW	(Mexico)	Javier Orozco	13	
9	FW	(Colombia)	Edixon Perea	17	
90	FW	(Mexico)	Marco Antonio Angúlo	1	
bye	RB	(Mexico)	Alejandro Castro	4	loan to Estudiantes Tecos
bye	RM	(Mexico)	César Villaluz	7	out to San Luis
bye	LM	(Chile)	Hugo Droguett	7	out to "undefined"

Last updated: 2 May 2012
Source: Squad stats and Start formations.
Only competitive matches.
Using the most used start formation.
Ordered by position on pitch (from back right to front left).

- Cruz Azul Starting 11 in their 4-4–2 formation

=== Apps, Goals and Discipline ===
League = Apertura 2011 & Clausura 2012

Cup = Copa Libertadores

Playoffs = Final Phase of the Apertura 2011 & Clausura 2012

Key:
‡ On loan from another club * First appearance(s) for the club

- # = Squad number
- Pos = Playing position
- P = Number of games played
- G = Number of goals scored
- GK = Goalkeeper
- DF = Defender
- MF = Midfielder
- FW = Forward
- = Yellow cards
- = Red cards
- † Permanent player left club during the season
- ¤ Loaned to another club for part or all of season

Correct as of 2 May 2012. Starting appearances are listed first, followed by substitute appearances in parentheses where applicable.

No.	Pos	Name	P	G	P	G	P	G	P	G	A yellow card	A red card	Notes
No.	Pos	Name	League		Cup		Playoffs		Total		Discipline		Notes
1	GK	(Mexico) José de Jesús Corona	24	-26	6	-3	2	-4	32	-35	4	0	(−) means goals conceded
12	GK	(Mexico) Guillermo Allison	0	0	0	0	0	0	0	0	0	0	(−) means goals conceded
20	GK	(Mexico) Javier Caso	0	0	0	0	0	0	0	0	0	0	(−) means goals conceded
25	GK	(Mexico) Yosgart Gutiérrez	10	-9	1(1)	-2	0	0	11(1)	-11	0	0	(−) means goals conceded
61	GK	(Mexico) Gibrán Lajud	0	0	0	0	0	0	0	0	0	0	(−) means goals conceded
2	DF	(Mexico) Fausto Pinto	29	0	2	0	1	0	32	0	8	2	
3	DF	(Chile) Waldo Ponce	14	0	0	0	0	0	14	0	4	0	Injured.
3	DF	(Mexico) Alberto Rodríguez	0	0	1	0	0	0	1	0	0	0	reinforcement only for the cup.
4	DF	(Mexico) Julio César Domínguez	27	0	1	0	2	0	30	0	1	0	
14	DF	(Mexico) Néstor Araujo	22	0	4	0	2	0	28	0	4	1	
15	DF	(Mexico) Gerardo Flores	16(3)	2	5	0	0(1)	0	21(4)*	2	2	0	
16	DF	(Mexico) Jair Pereira	19(2)	2	6	0	2	0	27(2)*	2	5	1	
17	DF	(Mexico) Manuel Mariaca	2	0	4(1)	0	0	0	6(1)	0	1	0	
22	DF	(Mexico) Adrián Cortés	15(3)	2	6	1	1	0	22(3)	3	0	0	
64	DF	(Mexico) Alan Emmanuel Vidal	0	0	0	0	0	0	0	0	0	0	
104	DF	(Mexico) Francisco Flores	1(1)	0	1(1)	0	0	0	2(2)*	0	1	0	
--	DF	(Mexico) Melvin Brown	0	0	0	0	0	0	0	0	0	0	reinforcement only for the cup.
6	MF	(Mexico) Gerardo Torrado	13(3)	0	1	0	2	0	16(3)	0	5	1	Injured.
7	MF	(Mexico) Javier Aquino	9(20)	2	2(1)	0	2	0	13(21)	2	5	0	
8	MF	(Mexico) Israel Castro	34	1	7	0	1	0	42*	1	4	0	
10	MF	(Argentina) Christian Giménez	27(1)	6	5(2)	1	2	0	34(3)	7	9	0	
18	MF	(Brazil) Maranhão	5(10)	0	5(1)	1	0	0	10(11)*	1	2	0	
21	MF	(Mexico) Héctor Gutiérrez	14(6)	0	5(1)	0	1	0	20(7)*	0	4	0	
23	MF	(Mexico) Héctor Altamirano	0	0	1	0	0	0	1	0	0	0	reinforcement only for the cup.
24	MF	(Mexico) Luis Alanis	0	0	0	0	0	0	0	0	0	0	
70	MF	(Mexico) Diego Israel Martínez	0	0	0	0	0	0	0	0	0	0	
73	MF	(Mexico) Luis Fernando Carrasco	0	0	0	0	0	0	0	0	0	0	
106	MF	(Mexico) Iñaki Domínguez	0	0	0(1)	0	0	0	0(1)*	0	0	0	
9	FW	(Colombia) Edixon Perea	13(7)	8	5(1)	2	0(2)	0	17(10)*	10	1	0	
11	FW	(Mexico) Alejandro Vela	12(3)	1	2(3)	0	0(1)	1	14(7)	2	2	0	
19	FW	(Mexico) Omar Bravo	17	3	2(3)	1	0	0	19(3)*	4	1	0	
27	FW	(Mexico) Javier Orozco	6(14)	6	5	5	2	1	13(14)	12	2	1	
30	FW	(Argentina) Emanuel Villa	24(2)	14	3(3)	1	2	0	29(5)	15	4	2	
90	FW	(Mexico) Marco Antonio Angúlo	1(3)	0	0	0	0	0	1(3)*	0	0	0	
bye	DF	(Mexico) Alejandro Castro¤	8(3)	0	—N/a	—N/a	0(1)	0	4(8)	0	2	0	loan to Estudiantes Tecos.
bye	MF	(Mexico) Allam Bello¤	0(1)	0	—N/a	—N/a	0	0	0(1)	0	0	0	loan to Neza FC.
bye	MF	(Mexico) César Villaluz†	7(7)	1	—N/a	—N/a	0	0	7(7)	1	2	0	out to San Luis.
bye	MF	(Chile) Hugo Droguett†	7(6)	0	—N/a	—N/a	0(1)	0	7(7)	0	0	0	loan to Jeonbuk Hyundai Motors.

=== Overall statistics team ===
	Total	Home	Away
Games played	43	22	21
Games won	17	11	6
Games drawn	15	7	8
Games lost	11	4	7
Biggest win (Apertura)	2-0 vs. Puebla, 0-2 vs. Estudiantes, 3-1 vs. América	2-0 vs. Puebla, 3-1 vs. America	0-2 vs. Estudiantes
Biggest win (Clausura)	0-3 vs. Toluca and 5-2 vs. Estudiantes	5-2 vs. Estudiantes	0-3 vs. Toluca
Biggest win (Libertadores)	4-0 vs. Deportivo Táchira	4-0 vs. Deportivo Táchira	1-2 vs. Nacional (PAR)
Biggest lose (Apertura)	1-0 vs. Pachuca, 0-1, 2-1 and 1-2 vs. Morelia, 1-0 vs. Santos Laguna, 1-0 vs. Querétaro	0-1 and 1-2 vs. Morelia	1-0 vs. Pachuca, 1-0 vs. Santos Laguna, 1-0 vs. Querétaro, 2-1 vs. Morelia
Biggest lose (Clausura)	2-0 vs. Morelia	0-1 vs. Santos Laguna, 1-2 vs. Querétaro	2-0 vs. Morelia
Biggest lose (Libertadores)	1-0 vs. Corinthians		1-0 vs. Corinthians
Goals scored	64	40	24
Goals conceded	44	22	22
Goal difference	+20	+18	+2
Average GF per game	1.49	1.82	1.14
Average GA per game	1.02	1	1.05
Most Game Started	42	(Mexico) Israel Castro	
Most appearances	42	(Mexico) Israel Castro	
Top scorer	15	(Argentina) Emanuel Villa	
Points	66/129 (51.16%)	39/66 (59.09%)	26/63 (41.27%)
Winning rate	17/43 (39.53%)	11/22 (50%)	6/21 (28.57%)

Last updated: May 2, 2012
Source: Competitive matches

|}

== Goalscorers ==
Position	Nation	Name	Apertura 2011	Clausura 2012	Copa Libertadores	Total
1	(Argentina)	Emanuel Villa	6	8	1	15
2	(Mexico)	Javier Orozco	5	2	5	12
3	(Colombia)	Edixon Perea	4	4	2	10
4	(Argentina)	Christian Giménez	1	5	1	7
5	(Mexico)	Omar Bravo	—N/a	3	1	4
6	(Mexico)	Adrián Cortés	2		1	3
7	(Mexico)	Javier Aquino	1	1		2
7	(Mexico)	Alejandro Vela	1	1		2
7	(Mexico)	Gerardo Flores	1	1		2
7	(Mexico)	Jair Pereira		2		2
7	—N/a	Own Goal	1	1		2
11	(Mexico)	Israel Castro		1		1
11	(Mexico)	César Villaluz	1	—N/a	—N/a	1
11	(Brazil)	Maranhão			1	1
TOTAL	—N/a	—N/a	23	29	12	64

=== Goal minutes ===
Updated to games played on 2 May.

1'–15'	16'–30'	31'–HT	46'–60'	61'–75'	76'–FT	Extra time	"Total"
5	13	9	11	14	11	1	64

== Results ==
=== Apertura 2011 ===
==== Results summary ====
Overall								Home						Away					
Pld	W	D	L	GF	GA	GD	Pts	W	D	L	GF	GA	GD	W	D	L	GF	GA	GD
19	8	5	6	23	18	+5	29	5	2	2	13	8	+5	3	3	4	10	10	0

Last updated: 26 November.
Source: Competitive Matches

==== Results by round ====
Round	1	2	3	4	5	6	7	8	9	10	11	12	13	14	15	16	17	18	19
Ground	A	H	A	H	A	H	A	H	A	H	A	H	A	A	H	A	H	A	H
Result	D	W	L	W	D	W	W	L	W	D	L	W	D	L	D	W	W	L	L
Position	10	6	7	4	4	3	1	3	2	2	4	2	2	5	4	3	2		

Updated to match(es) played on 26 November. Source: Competitive Matches
A = Away; H = Home; W = Win; D = Draw; L = Loss

=== Clausura 2012 ===
==== Results summary ====
Overall								Home						Away					
Pld	W	D	L	GF	GA	GD	Pts	W	D	L	GF	GA	GD	W	D	L	GF	GA	GD
17	6	7	4	29	22	+7	25	4	3	2	18	13	+5	2	4	2	11	9	+2

Last updated: Apr 30.
Source: Competitive Matches

==== Results by round ====
Round	1	2	3	4	5	6	7	8	9	10	11	12	13	14	15	16	17
Ground	H	A	H	A	H	A	H	A	H	A	H	A	H	H	A	H	A
Result	D	W	D	D	W	D	D	L	W	L	L	D	W	L	W	W	D
Position	6	3	6	7	4	6	9	9	9	9	9	11	9	10	8	8	9

Updated to match(es) played on Apr 30. Source: Competitive Matches
A = Away; H = Home; W = Win; D = Draw; L = Loss

=== Copa Libertadores ===
==== Results summary ====
Overall								Home						Away					
Pld	W	D	L	GF	GA	GD	Pts	W	D	L	GF	GA	GD	W	D	L	GF	GA	GD
7	3	3	1	12	5	+7	12	2	2	0	9	2	+7	1	1	1	3	3	0

Last updated: May 2.
Source: Competitive Matches

==== Results by round ====
Round	1	2	3	4	5	6	7	8
Ground	A	H	H	A	A	H	H	A
Result	W	W	D	L	D	W	D	
Position	1	1	1	2	2	2		

Updated to match(es) played on May 2. Source: Competitive Matches
A = Away; H = Home; W = Win; D = Draw; L = Loss

== IFFHS Ranking ==
Cruz Azul position on the Club World Ranking during the 2011–12 season, according to IFFHS.

Month	Position	Points
July	60	153
August	89	124.5
September	157	100.5
October	177	94.5
November	169	94.5
December	175	94.5
January	178	94.5
February	126	112
March	135	107
April	87	128
May	TBD	TBD
June		

Last updated: May 7, 2012.
Source: IFFHS
