= 2009–10 Cruz Azul season =

Cruz Azul
2009–10 season
- Owner: Cooperativa La Cruz Azul, S.C.L.
- Chairman: Guillermo Álvarez Cuevas
- Manager: Enrique Meza
- Stadium: Estadio Azul
- Primera División: Apertura: 2nd (Runners-up); Bicentenario: 9th (Did not qualify)
- CONCACAF Champions League: Runners-up
- Top goalscorer: League: Emanuel Villa (25); All: Emanuel Villa (28)
- Biggest win: Cruz Azul 5–0 Columbus Crew (26 August 2009)
- Biggest defeat: Puebla 4–1 Cruz Azul (18 April 2010)
Home colours	Away colours

The 2009–10 Deportivo Cruz Azul season was the 83rd season in the football club's history and the 45th consecutive season in the top flight of Mexican football. The club participated in the Apertura and Bicentenario tournaments of the Mexican Primera División and in the CONCACAF Champions League.

== Coaching staff ==
Position	Name
Head coach	(Mexico) Enrique Meza
Assistant coach	(Mexico) Eugenio Villazón
Fitness coach	(Mexico) Daniel Ipata
Kinesiologist	(Mexico) Juan Rubio
Doctor	(Mexico) Alfonso Jiménez

== Players ==
=== Torneo Apertura ===
No.	Pos.	Nat.	Name	Date of birth (age)	Since	Previous club
Goalkeepers
1	GK	(Mexico)	José de Jesús Corona	26 January 1981 (aged 28)	2009	(Mexico) UAG
12	GK	(Mexico)	Julio César Valdivia	5 June 1982 (aged 27)	2006	(Mexico) Youth system
25	GK	(Mexico)	Yosgart Gutiérrez	15 May 1981 (aged 28)	2003	(Mexico) Youth system
Defenders
2	DF	(Mexico)	Fausto Pinto	8 August 1983 (aged 25)	2009 (Winter)	(Mexico) Pachuca
3	DF	(Mexico)	Joel Huiqui	18 February 1983 (aged 26)	2002	(Mexico) Youth system
4	DF	(Mexico)	Julio César Domínguez	8 November 1987 (aged 21)	2006	(Mexico) Youth system
13	DF	(Mexico)	Melvin Brown	28 January 1979 (aged 30)	1998	(Mexico) Youth system
15	DF	(Mexico)	Horacio Cervantes	17 October 1981 (aged 27)	2009	(Mexico) Morelia
16	DF	(Mexico)	Rogelio Chávez	28 October 1984 (aged 24)	2004	(Mexico) Cruz Azul Oaxaca
20	DF	(Mexico)	Alejandro Castro	27 March 1987 (aged 22)	2005	(Mexico) Youth system
22	DF	(Mexico)	Adrián Cortés	19 November 1983 (aged 25)	2009	(Mexico) UAG
Midfielders
5	MF	(Mexico)	Gabino Velasco	9 April 1984 (aged 25)	2006	(Mexico) Youth system
6	MF	(Mexico)	Gerardo Torrado (Captain)	30 April 1979 (aged 30)	2005	(Spain) Racing Santander
7	MF	(Paraguay)	Cristian Riveros (VC)	16 October 1982 (aged 26)	2007	(Paraguay) Libertad
8	MF	(Mexico)	Édgar Andrade	2 March 1988 (aged 21)	2006	(Mexico) Youth system
10	MF	(Honduras)	Ramón Núñez	14 November 1985 (aged 23)	2009	(Mexico) Puebla
18	MF	(Mexico)	César Villaluz	18 July 1988 (aged 21)	2006	(Mexico) Youth system
21	MF	(Mexico)	Jaime Lozano	29 September 1978 (aged 30)	2007	(Mexico) UANL
23	MF	(Mexico)	Gerardo Lugo	31 December 1984 (aged 24)	2006	(Mexico) Youth system
28	MF	(Mexico)	Héctor Gutiérrez	29 August 1986 (aged 22)	2008	(Mexico) Youth system
Forwards
9	FW	(Paraguay)	Pablo Zeballos	8 August 1983 (aged 25)	2008 (Winter)	(Paraguay) Sol de América
11	FW	(Mexico)	Mario Ortiz	4 June 1983 (aged 26)	2009	(Mexico) UAG
14	FW	(Chile)	Emilio Hernández	14 September 1984 (aged 24)	2009	Universidad de Chile
19	FW	(Mexico)	Alejandro Vela	28 March 1984 (aged 25)	2008	(Mexico) Chiapas
27	FW	(Mexico)	Javier Orozco	16 November 1987 (aged 21)	2005	(Mexico) Youth system
30	FW	(Argentina)	Emanuel Villa	24 February 1982 (aged 27)	2009	(England) Derby County

Note: Flags indicate national team as has been defined under FIFA eligibility rules. Players may hold more than one non-FIFA nationality.

== Transfers ==
=== In ===
N	Pos.	Nat.	Name	Age	Moving from	Type	Transfer window	Source
1	GK	(Mexico)	José de Jesús Corona	26 January 1981 (aged 28)	UAG	Transfer	Summer	
10	MF	(Honduras)	Ramón Núñez	14 November 1985 (aged 23)	Puebla	Transfer	Summer	
14	FW	(Chile)	Emilio Hernández	14 September 1984 (aged 24)	Universidad de Chile	Transfer	Summer	
22	DF	(Mexico)	Adrián Cortés	19 November 1983 (aged 25)	UAG	Loan return	Summer	
30	FW	(Argentina)	Emanuel Villa	24 February 1982 (aged 27)	(England) Derby County	Transfer	Summer	
8	MF	(Mexico)	Israel López	29 September 1974 (aged 35)	Toluca	Transfer	Winter	
9	FW	(Argentina)	Maximiliano Biancucchi	15 September 1984 (aged 25)	(Brazil) Flamengo	Transfer	Winter	
10	MF	(Argentina)	Christian Giménez	1 February 1981 (aged 28)	Pachuca	Transfer	Winter	
26	DF	(Brazil)	Edcarlos	10 May 1985 (aged 24)	(Brazil) Fluminense	Transfer	Winter	

=== Out ===
N	Pos.	Nat.	Name	Age	Moving to	Type	Transfer window	Source
17	FW	(Mexico)	Luis Ángel Landín	23 July 1985 (aged 24)	(United States) Houston Dynamo	Loan	Summer	

== Competitions ==
=== Overview ===
Competition	First match	Last match	Starting round	Final position	Record							
Competition	First match	Last match	Starting round	Final position	Pld	W	D	L	GF	GA	GD	Win %
Torneo Apertura	25 July 2009	13 December 2009	Matchday 1	runners-up	23	13	2	8	48	32	+16	56.52
Torneo Bicentenario	16 January 2010	24 April 2010	Matchday 1	9th	17	7	4	6	20	20	+0	41.18
CONCACAF Champions League	30 July 2009	7 April 2010	Preliminary round	runners-up	14	10	2	2	33	9	+24	71.43
Total					54	30	8	16	101	61	+40	55.56

Source: Mediotiempo.com

=== Torneo Apertura ===
==== League table ====
Pos	Team	Pld	W	D	L	GF	GA	GD	Pts	Qualification or relegation
1	Toluca	17	11	2	4	32	19	+13	35	Advance to Liguilla
2	Cruz Azul	17	11	0	6	35	19	+16	33	Advance to Liguilla
3	Morelia	17	10	3	4	31	15	+16	33	Advance to Liguilla
4	América	17	8	6	3	29	16	+13	30	Advance to Liguilla
5	Monterrey (C)	17	9	3	5	27	16	+11	30	Advance to Liguilla

Source: Liga MX
Rules for classification: 1) Points; 2) Goal difference; 3) Number of goals scored; 4) Head-to-head results between tied teams; 5) Number of goals scored away; 6) Highest relegation coefficient; 7) Fair Play points
(C) Champions

==== Results summary ====
Overall								Home						Away					
Pld	W	D	L	GF	GA	GD	Pts	W	D	L	GF	GA	GD	W	D	L	GF	GA	GD
17	11	0	6	35	19	+16	33	6	0	3	21	11	+10	5	0	3	14	8	+6

Source: LigaMX

==== Result round by round ====
Round	1	2	3	4	5	6	7	8	9	10	11	12	13	14	15	16	17
Ground	H	A	H	A	H	A	H	A	H	H	A	H	A	H	A	H	A
Result	L	W	W	L	L	W	W	W	W	L	L	W	L	W	W	W	W
Position																	2

Source: LigaMX
A = Away; H = Home; W = Win; D = Draw; L = Loss

=== Torneo Bicentenario ===
==== League table ====
Pos	Team	Pld	W	D	L	GF	GA	GD	Pts	Qualification or relegation
7	Morelia	17	7	4	6	22	13	+9	25	Advance to Liguilla
8	Pachuca	17	7	4	6	27	26	+1	25	Advance to Liguilla
9	Cruz Azul	17	7	4	6	20	20	0	25	
10	Atlas	17	7	3	7	26	23	+3	24	
11	Querétaro	17	6	3	8	13	25	−12	21	

Source: Liga MX
Rules for classification: 1) Points; 2) Goal difference; 3) Number of goals scored; 4) Head-to-head results between tied teams; 5) Number of goals scored away; 6) Highest relegation coefficient; 7) Fair Play points

==== Results summary ====
Overall								Home						Away					
Pld	W	D	L	GF	GA	GD	Pts	W	D	L	GF	GA	GD	W	D	L	GF	GA	GD
17	7	4	6	20	20	0	25	4	3	1	12	6	+6	3	1	5	8	14	−6

Source: LigaMX

==== Result round by round ====
Round	1	2	3	4	5	6	7	8	9	10	11	12	13	14	15	16	17
Ground	A	H	A	H	A	H	A	H	A	A	H	A	H	A	H	A	H
Result	W	D	L	L	L	W	D	W	W	W	W	L	W	L	D	L	D
Position																	9

Source: LigaMX
A = Away; H = Home; W = Win; D = Draw; L = Loss

== Statistics ==
=== Goals ===
Rank	Player	Position	Apertura	Bicentenario	Concacaf CL	Total
1	(Argentina) Emanuel Villa	FW	19	6	3	28
2	(Mexico) Jaime Lozano	MF	5	2	3	10
2	(Mexico) Javier Orozco	FW	4	1	5	10
4	(Paraguay) Cristian Riveros	MF	4	2	3	9
5	(Paraguay) Pablo Zeballos	FW	1	0	5	6
6	(Mexico) Melvin Brown	DF	1	3	0	4
6	(Mexico) Rogelio Chávez	DF	3	0	1	4
6	(Mexico) Alejandro Vela	FW	1	0	3	4
9	(Mexico) Mario Ortiz	FW	2	0	1	3
9	(Mexico) César Villaluz	MF	1	1	1	3
11	(Mexico) Maximiliano Biancucchi	FW	0	2	0	2
11	(Argentina) Christian Giménez	MF	0	2	0	2
11	(Mexico) Gerardo Lugo	MF	1	0	1	2
11	(Honduras) Ramón Núñez	MF	0	0	2	2
15	(Mexico) Alejandro Castro	DF	1	0	0	1
15	(Mexico) Horacio Cervantes	DF	0	0	1	1
15	(Mexico) Adrián Cortés	DF	0	0	1	1
15	(Mexico) Julio César Domínguez	DF	1	0	0	1
15	(Brazil) Edcarlos	DF	0	1	0	1
15	(Mexico) Joel Huiqui	DF	0	0	1	1
15	(Mexico) Fausto Pinto	DF	1	0	0	1
15	(Mexico) Gerardo Torrado	MF	1	0	0	1
15	(Mexico) Gabino Velasco	MF	1	0	0	1
Total			47	20	31	98

=== Clean sheets ===
Rank	Name	Apertura	Bicentenario	Concacaf CL	Total
1	(Mexico) José de Jesús Corona	6	4	1	11
1	(Mexico) Yosgart Gutiérrez	2	2	7	11
Total		8	6	8	22

=== Hat-tricks ===
Player	Against	Result	Date	Competition
(Argentina) Emanuel Villa	San Luis	4–2 (H)^{1}	19 September 2009	Primera División
(Mexico) Javier Orozco	(Costa Rica) Herediano	6–2 (A)	30 July 2009	CONCACAF Champions League
(Mexico) Jaime Lozano	(United States) Columbus Crew	5–0 (H)	26 August 2009	CONCACAF Champions League

^{1} The player scored 4 goals in the match.

=== Own goals ===
Player	Against	Result	Date	Competition
(Argentina) Emanuel Villa	Monterrey	3–4 (A)	10 December 2009	Primera División
(Brazil) Edcarlos	Guadalajara	1–1 (A)	24 April 2010	Primera División
