= Javier Orozco =

Mexican footballer (born 1987)

Personal information
- Full name: Javier Antonio Orozco Peñuelas
- Date of birth: 16 November 1987 (age 38)
- Place of birth: Los Mochis, Sinaloa, Mexico
- Height: 1.72 m (5 ft 8 in)
- Position: Forward

Youth career
- 2002–2005: Cruz Azul

Senior career*
Years	Team	Apps	(Gls)
2005–2010	Cruz Azul Hidalgo	43	(22)
2005–2013	Cruz Azul	126	(29)
2013–2017	Santos Laguna	85	(24)
2016	→ Chiapas (loan)	12	(1)
2017	→ Veracruz (loan)	6	(0)
2017–2020	Tampico Madero	67	(26)
2021	Cancún	15	(2)
2021	Xelajú	23	(5)

International career
2010–2015	Mexico	14	(0)
Medal record
Men's football
Representing Mexico
CONCACAF Gold Cup
Winner	2015 United States–Canada	Team
- * Club domestic league appearances and goals as of December 13, 2021

Javier Antonio Orozco Peñuelas (Note: In this Spanish name, the first or paternal surname is Orozco and the second or maternal family name is Peñuelas.) (born November 16, 1987) is a Mexican former professional footballer who played as a forward. He is popularly known by his nickname "Chuletita".

== Club career ==
Orozco made his debut on September 17, 2005, against Tigres, a game which resulted in a 1–2 victory for Cruz Azul. In the Apertura 2010, he scored the first goal of the season, and currently leads the season with 6 goals. He scored 4 goals and had an assist against Real Salt Lake of the MLS to defeat them 5–4. He is also the top goalscorer in CONCACAF Champions League history, as he has netted 24 times.

On June 8, 2016, Jaguares de Chiapas made the signing of Chuletita official for the Apertura 2016.

== International career ==
Orozco got his first call-up by interim coach Efraín Flores for friendly matches on September 4 and 7, 2010, against Ecuador and Colombia, respectively. He started for the first time on October 12, against Venezuela. In 2015, he was called up to represent Mexico in the 2015 CONCACAF Gold Cup after Javier "Chicharito" Hernández suffered an injury in a friendly before the tournament, Mexico later went on to win that tournament.

== Personal life ==
Javier Orozco is the son of Luis Antonio Orozco who played in Atletico Tecoman and Irapuato FC in the 1980s and also is brother to Luis Orozco that plays for Club Tijuana who is also a striker. Orozco is nicknamed "Chuletita" (little pork-chop). The nickname comes from his father, Luis Antonio Orozco, who earned the moniker "Chuleta" when he was six years old, by his father, who would tell him "vete por las chuletas" — a Mexican slang saying which roughly translates to "go get the money."

== Career statistics ==
=== Club ===
As of 28 February 2016

Appearances and goals by club, season and competition
Club	Season	League			Copa MX		Concachampions		Libertadores		Total	
Club	Season	Division	Apps	Goals	Apps	Goals	Apps	Goals	Apps	Goals	Apps	Goals
Cruz Azul	2005–06	Mexican Primera División	3	0	-	-	-	-	-	-	3	0
Cruz Azul	2006–07	Mexican Primera División	0	0	-	-	-	-	-	-	0	0
Cruz Azul	2008–09	Mexican Primera División	10	2	-	-	6	7	-	-	16	9
Cruz Azul	2009–10	Mexican Primera División	23	5	-	-	10	5	-	-	33	10
Cruz Azul	2010–11	Mexican Primera División	29	6	-	-	11	11	-	-	40	17
Cruz Azul	2011–12	Mexican Primera División	22	7	-	-	-	-	6	5	28	12
Cruz Azul	2012–13	Liga MX	39	9	9	5	-	-	-	-	48	14
Cruz Azul	Total		126	29	9	5	27	23	6	5	168	62
Santos Laguna	2013–14	Liga MX	30	10	1	0	-	-	5	2	36	12
Santos Laguna	2014–15	Liga MX	36	12	13	5	-	-	-	-	49	17
Santos Laguna	2015–16	Liga MX	19	2	-	-	4	1	-	-	23	3
Santos Laguna	Total		85	24	14	5	4	1	5	2	108	32
Career total			211	53	23	10	31	24	11	7	276	94

=== International ===
As of match played 27 July 2015

National team	Year	Apps	Goals
Mexico	2010	3	0
Mexico	2013	4	0
Mexico	2014	4	0
Mexico	2015	3	0
Total		14	0

== Honours ==
Cruz Azul

- Copa MX: Clausura 2013

Santos Laguna

- Liga MX: Clausura 2015
- Copa MX: Apertura 2014
- Campeón de Campeones: 2015

Mexico

- CONCACAF Gold Cup: 2015

Individual

- CONCACAF Champions League Golden Boot: 2008–09, 2010–11
- Copa Santander Libertadores 2012: Player of the Week (Week 3)
