= Televisa Deportes =

Sports division of Televisa

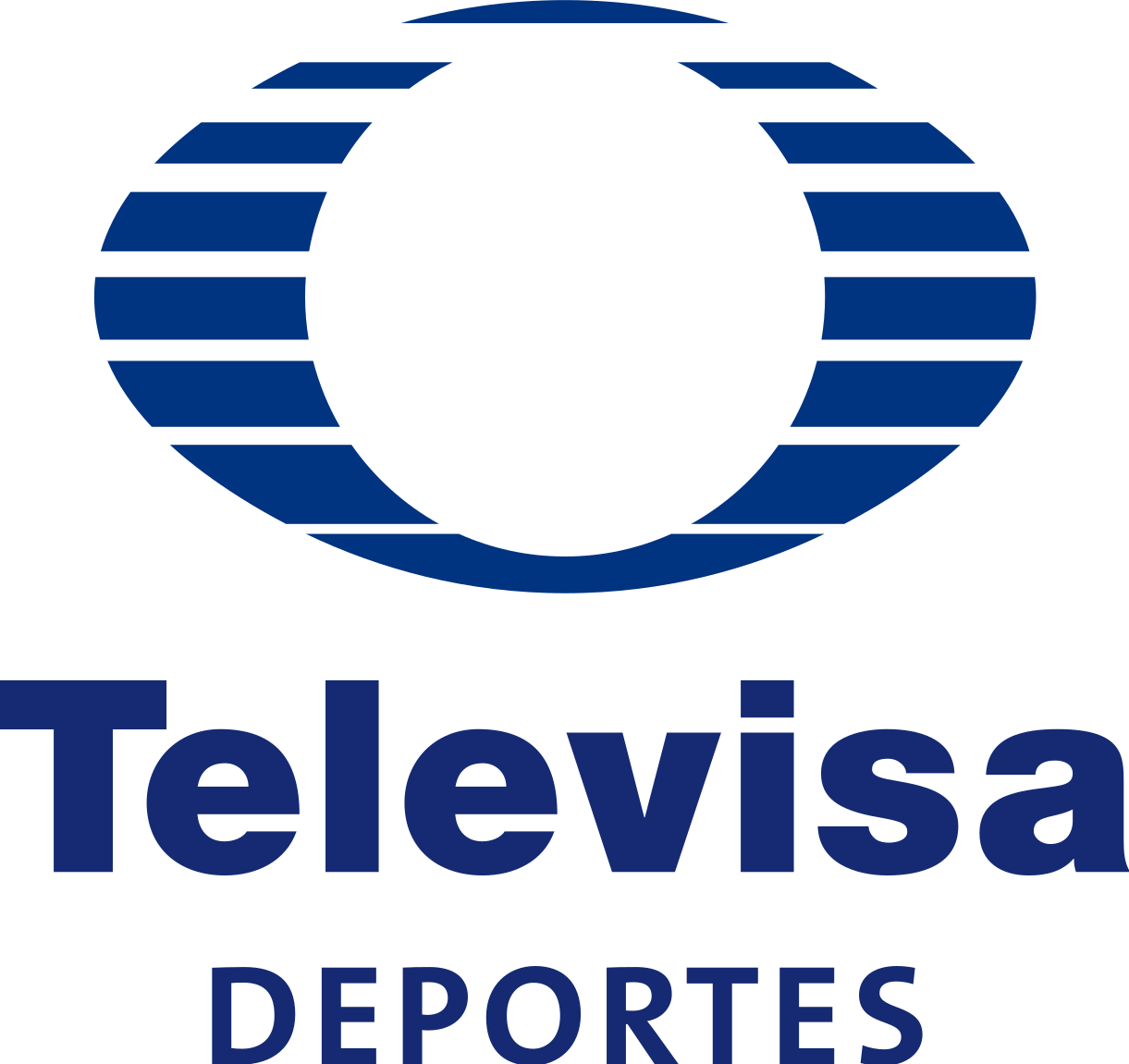
Previous logo of Televisa Deportes, used until July 19, 2019

TUDN (formerly Televisa Deportes) is a division of the Mexican television broadcaster Televisa that produces sports programming for Las Estrellas, Canal 5, Nueve, Foro TV and the TUDN TV channel.

On July 20, 2019, Televisa Deportes was renamed TUDN, in a rebranding which Televisa Deportes Network TV channel also changed its name, along with Univision Deportes programming division and UDN TV channel in the United States. The new branding is a combination of abbreviations TDN and UDN, but the first two letters are also pronounced as the Spanish adjective "tu" (your), allowing the name to also be read as "Tu deportes network" ("Your sports network"). TUDN will be promoted as a multi-platform brand, and there will be closer collaboration between the Mexican and American counterparts—allowing for expanded studio programming in the morning and daytime hours (to bolster its expansion into European soccer with its recent acquisition of UEFA rights, and existing content such as Liga MX soccer).

== Notable personalities ==
=== Present ===
==== Play-by-play ====
- Enrique Bermúdez de la Serna
- Francisco Javier González Chávez

==== Analysts ====
- Carlos Alberto Etcheverry
- Damián Zamogilny
- Emanuel Villa
- Francisco Fonseca
- Hugo Salcedo
- Ileana Dávila
- Marc Crosas
- Marco Antonio Rodríguez
- Moisés Muñoz
- Oswaldo Sánchez
- Rafael Márquez

==== Anchors ====
- Toño de Valdés
- Tania Rincón

=== Former ===
- Paco Villa (deceased)
