= Jesús Lara (footballer) =

Mexican footballer (born 1994)

Personal information
- Full name: Jesús Alberto Lara García
- Date of birth: 8 April 1994 (age 32)
- Place of birth: Salamanca, Guanajuato, Mexico
- Height: 1.68 m (5 ft 6 in)
- Position: Winger

Youth career
- 2009–2010: Inter de Tehuacán
- 2010–2012: Cruz Azul

Senior career*
Years	Team	Apps	(Gls)
2013–2014	Cruz Azul	4	(0)
2013–2015	→ Cruz Azul Hidalgo (loan)	30	(7)
2015–2017	Zacatepec	61	(13)
2017	Cimarrones de Sonora	7	(1)
2018	Veracruz	6	(0)
2018–2019	Atlético Reynosa	27	(4)
2019–2020	Alebrijes de Oaxaca	10	(4)
2020	Venados	14	(1)
2021–2022	Matamoros	11	(1)
- * Club domestic league appearances and goals as of October 20, 2019

Jesús Alberto Lara García (born 8 April 1994) is a Mexican professional footballer who currently plays for Alebrijes de Oaxaca on loan from Cruz Azul.
