= Juan García Sancho =

Mexican footballer (born 1994)

Personal information
- Full name: Juan Carlos García Sancho Orozco
- Date of birth: 10 November 1994 (age 31)
- Place of birth: Tepic, Nayarit, Mexico
- Height: 1.84 m (6 ft 0 in)
- Position: Centre-back

Team information
- Current team: Tlaxcala
- Number: 5

Youth career
- 2009–2010: Vaqueros Nayarit
- 2011–2015: Cruz Azul

Senior career*
Years	Team	Apps	(Gls)
2015–2019	Cruz Azul	13	(0)
2017–2018	→ Lobos BUAP (loan)	2	(0)
2018	→ UAT (loan)	8	(0)
2019	→ Celaya (loan)	7	(0)
2019–2023	Sonora	112	(3)
2023	Pérez Zeledón	12	(0)
2024	Sinaloa	27	(0)
2025	Atlético Morelia	10	(0)
2025	Venados	9	(1)
2026–	Tlaxcala	0	(0)
- * Club domestic league appearances and goals as of 5 April 2025

Juan Carlos García Sancho Orozco (born 10 November 1994) is a Mexican professional footballer who plays as a centre-back for Liga de Expansión MX club Tlaxcala.
