= Javier Caso =

Mexican footballer (born 1986)

Personal information
- Full name: Javier Enrique Caso Ravelo
- Date of birth: 20 March 1986 (age 40)
- Place of birth: Xalapa, Veracruz, Mexico
- Height: 1.73 m (5 ft 8 in)
- Position: Goalkeeper

Senior career*
Years	Team	Apps	(Gls)
2007–2014	Cruz Azul Hidalgo	110	(0)
2011–2014	Cruz Azul	0	(0)
2014–2017	Zacatepec	7	(0)
- * Club domestic league appearances and goals

Javier Enrique Caso Ravelo (born 20 March 1986) is a Mexican former football player.

== Career ==
He suffered a broken jaw in a game in September 2011.
