= Raúl Vidal =

Mexican footballer (born 1994)

Personal information
- Full name: Raúl Antonio Vidal Moreno
- Date of birth: 26 March 1994 (age 32)
- Place of birth: Salamanca, Guanajuato, Mexico
- Height: 1.71 m (5 ft 7 in)
- Position: Midfielder

Team information
- Current team: A.D. San Carlos
- Number: 88

Youth career
- 2009–2010: Inter Tehuacán
- 2010–2012: Cruz Azul

Senior career*
Years	Team	Apps	(Gls)
2012–2014	Cruz Azul Hidalgo	9	(1)
2015	Santos de Soledad	11	(2)
2016	Atlético Veracruz	7	(1)
2017–2018	Necaxa Premier	21	(1)
2018–2020	Tepatitlán de Morelos	38	(3)
2021	Municipal Garabito		
2022	Puntarenas F.C.		
2022–2025	Municipal Liberia	50	(20)
2025–	A.D. San Carlos	0	(0)
- * Club domestic league appearances and goals as of 14 November 2024

Raúl Antonio Vidal Moreno (born March 26, 1994) is a professional Mexican footballer who currently plays as a midfielder for Tepatitlán de Morelos.
