= Gabino Velasco =

Mexican footballer (born 1984)

Personal information
- Full name: Gabino Alberto Velasco Rivas
- Date of birth: 9 April 1984 (age 42)
- Place of birth: Mexico City, Mexico
- Height: 1.80 m (5 ft 11 in)
- Positions: Central midfielder; defensive midfielder

Youth career
- 2002–2006: Cruz Azul

Senior career*
Years	Team	Apps	(Gls)
2006–2012	Cruz Azul	26	(4)
2010	→ Club León (loan)	8	(0)
2010–2011	→ Querétaro (loan)	22	(0)
2012	→ Irapuato (loan)	13	(0)
2012–2015	Cruz Azul Hidalgo	23	(0)
2013–2015	→ Ballenas Galeana (loan)	9	(1)
2017	Venados	7	(0)

Managerial career
- 2019–2022: Cruz Azul Reserves and Academy
- 2023: Cañada CTM
- 2023–2024: Cruz Azul Reserves and Academy
- 2024–2025: Querétaro Reserves and Academy
- 2026: Atlético Morelia (Assistant)
- * Club domestic league appearances and goals as of October 1, 2013

Gabino Alberto Velasco Rivas (born April 9, 1984) is a former Mexican professional footballer, who was brought up by Querétaro FC. He made his debut April 8, 2006, a day before his birthday, against CD Veracruz, a game which resulted in a 3–0 victory for Cruz Azul.

On December 9, 2012, Cruz Azul signed him as a full international in 2013. He first played in the Primera Division for CF Puebla from August 2013 to March 2014 before joining Cruz Azul on September 18, 2014. He helped them win the Liga MX championship for the second time and made his Mexico debut against Honduras.

He last played for Venados on loan from Cruz Azul in the Ascenso MX league of Mexico.
