= Manuel Mariaca =

Mexican footballer (born 1986)

Personal information
- Full name: Manuel Enrique Mariaca Cajigal
- Date of birth: January 4, 1986 (age 40)
- Place of birth: Cuernavaca, Morelos, Mexico
- Height: 1.80 m (5 ft 11 in)
- Position: Defender

Youth career
- 2001–2006: Cruz Azul

Senior career*
Years	Team	Apps	(Gls)
2006–2011	Cruz Azul Hidalgo	116	(2)
2011–2012	Cruz Azul	3	(0)
2012	→ Lobos BUAP (loan)	5	(0)
2013	Cruz Azul Hidalgo	18	(0)
2020	Morelos	0	(0)
- * Club domestic league appearances and goals

Manuel Mariaca (born January 4, 1986) is a Mexican former footballer who played as a defender.

== See also ==
- List of people from Morelos
