= Julio César Valdivia =

Mexican footballer (born 1982)

Personal information
- Full name: Julio César Valdivia Valle
- Date of birth: 5 June 1982 (age 44)
- Place of birth: León, Guanajuato, Mexico
- Height: 1.86 m (6 ft 1 in)
- Position: Goalkeeper

Youth career
- Cruz Azul

Senior career*
Years	Team	Apps	(Gls)
2004–2009	Cruz Azul Hidalgo	82	(0)
2007–2008	Cruz Azul	1	(0)
- * Club domestic league appearances and goals

Julio César Valdivia Valle (born 5 June 1982) is a Mexican former football goalkeeper.

== Club career ==
He made his only appearance for the senior team of Cruz Azul in the 2008–09 CONCACAF Champions League.
