= Edixon Perea =

Colombian footballer (born 1984)

Personal information
- Full name: Édixon Perea Valencia
- Date of birth: 20 April 1984 (age 42)
- Place of birth: Cali, Colombia
- Height: 1.76 m (5 ft 9 in)
- Position: Striker

Youth career
- 1998–2001: Atlético Huila

Senior career*
Years	Team	Apps	(Gls)
2001–2002	Atlético Huila	24	(6)
2002	Deportes Quindío	18	(4)
2002–2003	Deportivo Pasto	9	(1)
2003–2005	Atlético Nacional	86	(38)
2005–2008	Bordeaux	38	(3)
2008–2010	Grêmio	40	(12)
2010–2011	Las Palmas	10	(0)
2011–2012	Cruz Azul	22	(8)
2012–2013	Changchun Yatai	12	(2)
2013	→ Deportivo Cali (loan)	23	(4)
2013–2014	Budapest Honvéd	6	(2)
2016	América de Cali	1	(0)

International career
2001–2003	Colombia U-20	7	(1)
2004–2008	Colombia	26	(9)
- * Club domestic league appearances and goals

Edixon Perea Valencia (Spanish pronunciation: [ˈeðiksom peˈɾea]; (Note: In isolation, Edixon is pronounced [ˈeðikson].) born 20 April 1984) is a Colombian former professional footballer who played as a striker.

== Club career ==
Perea was born in the Colombian village of Cali. He played 29 games in the 2005 season for Atlético Nacional before joining Bordeaux. He was one of the players who helped the Colombia U20 national team reach the third place in the 2003 FIFA World Youth Championship. He was on trial at the English Premier League Club Blackburn Rovers in 2010.

== International career ==
Perea was on the Colombia national team where he was called upon during the qualifying campaign for the 2006 FIFA World Cup. He played for Colombia at the Copa America in 2004 and 2007.

== Career statistics ==
=== Club ===
Appearances and goals by club, season and competition
Club	Season	League			National cup		League cup		Europe		Total	
Club	Season	Division	Apps	Goals	Apps	Goals	Apps	Goals	Apps	Goals	Apps	Goals
Huila	2001	Categoría Primera A	24	6	0	0	0	0	0	0	24	6
Quindío	2002	Categoría Primera A	18	4	0	0	0	0	0	0	18	4
Pasto	2002	Categoría Primera A	9	1	0	0	0	0	0	0	9	1
Atlético Nacional	2003	Categoría Primera A	22	5	0	0	0	0	0	0	22	5
Atlético Nacional	2004	Categoría Primera A	45	18	0	0	0	0	0	0	45	18
Atlético Nacional	2005	Categoría Primera A	19	15	0	0	0	0	0	0	19	15
Atlético Nacional	Total		86	38	0	0	0	0	0	0	86	38
Bordeaux	2005–06	Ligue 1	21	1	0	0	0	0	0	0	21	1
Bordeaux	2006–07	Ligue 1	17	2	0	0	0	0	4	0	21	2
Bordeaux	Total		38	3	0	0	0	0	4	0	42	3
Grêmio	2008	Série A	27	9	0	0	0	0	1	1	28	10
Grêmio	2009	Série A	13	3	0	0	0	0	1	0	14	3
Grêmio	Total		40	12	0	0	0	0	2	1	42	13
Las Palmas	2010–11	Segunda División	10	0	0	0	0	0	0	0	10	0
Cruz Azul	2011–12	Mexican Primera División	22	8	0	0	0	0	7	2	29	10
Changchun	2012	Chinese Super League	12	2	0	0	0	0	0	0	12	2
Cali	2013	Categoría Primera A	23	4	2	0	0	0	0	0	25	4
Honvéd	2013–14	Nemzeti Bajnokság I	6	2	1	0	1	0	0	0	8	2
Career total			288	80	3	0	1	0	13	3	305	83

=== International ===
Scores and results list Colombia's goal tally first, score column indicates score after each Perea goal.

List of international goals scored by Edixon Perea
No.	Date	Venue	Opponent	Score	Result	Competition
1	9 July 2004	Estadio Nacional, Lima, Peru	Bolivia	1–0	1–0	Copa América 2004
2	15 January 2005	Memorial Coliseum, Los Angeles, United States	South Korea	2–1	2–1	Friendly
3	23 February 2005	Estadio Carlos González, Culiacán, Mexico	Mexico	1–1	1–1	Friendly
4	4 June 2005	Metropolitano, Barranquilla, Colombia	Peru	5–0	5–0	2006 FIFA World Cup qualification
5	25 March 2007	Orange Bowl, Miami, United States	Switzerland	1–0	3–1	Friendly
6	23 June 2007	Metropolitano, Barranquilla, Colombia	Ecuador	3–1	3–1	Friendly
7	2 July 2007	Estadio José Pachencho, Maracaibo, Venezuela	Argentina	1–0	2–4	Copa América 2007
8	6 February 2008	Estadio Centenario, Montevideo, Uruguay	Uruguay	1–0	2–2	Friendly
9	6 February 2008	Estadio Centenario, Montevideo, Uruguay	Uruguay	2–0	2–2	Friendly
