= Martín Galván =

Mexican footballer (born 1993)

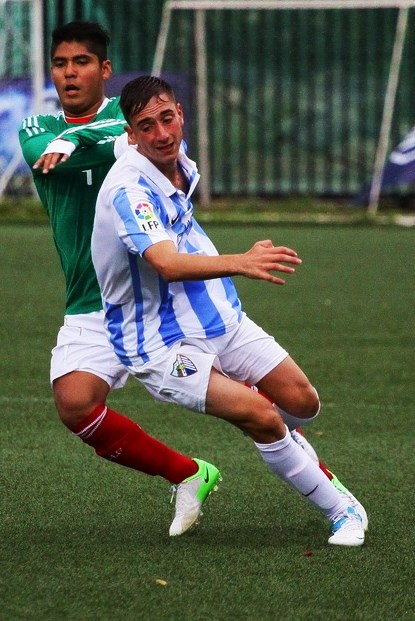
- Martín Galván playing for Mexico U20 in 2012.

Personal information
- Full name: Martín Luis Galván Romo
- Date of birth: 14 February 1993 (age 33)
- Place of birth: Acapulco, Guerrero, Mexico
- Height: 1.79 m (5 ft 10 in)
- Positions: Forward; winger

Team information
- Current team: Santa Marta

Youth career
- 2006–2008: Cruz Azul

Senior career*
Years	Team	Apps	(Gls)
2008–2015	Cruz Azul	3	(0)
2011–2012	→ Cruz Azul Hidalgo (loan)	4	(2)
2013	→ Cruz Azul Hidalgo (loan)	3	(0)
2014	→ UAT (loan)	8	(2)
2015	Atlante	2	(0)
2015–2016	Reynosa	31	(11)
2016	Cruz Azul Hidalgo	13	(5)
2017	Pioneros de Cancún	11	(0)
2017–2020	Salamanca	25	(5)
2020–2022	Juárez	20	(3)
2022–2023	UdeG	30	(7)
2023–2025	Salamanca	45	(8)
2025–	Santa Marta	2	(0)

International career
2009–2011	Mexico U17	6	(5)
2012	Mexico U20	5	(3)
- * Club domestic league appearances and goals as of 20 September 2025

Martín Luis Galván Romo (born 14 February 1993) is a Mexican professional footballer who plays as a winger for Spanish Tercera Federación club Santa Marta.

== Club career ==
Galván was born in Acapulco, Guerrero. On 5 January 2008, he debuted in an official match in the InterLiga tournament as an 85th-minute substitute against Monterrey becoming the youngest professional player in Mexican football history at 14 years and 325 days of age. The match ended in a 1–0 win for Cruz Azul.

Galván made his debut in the league November 2008, coming on as a sub against Indios.

=== Cruz Azul Hidalgo ===
In the 2011/12 season, Galván transferred to Cruz Azul's affiliate team Cruz Azul Hidalgo. He made four appearances in Ascenso MX league, scoring two goals.

Galván rejoined Cruz Azul Hidalgo on loan in January 2013.

== International career ==
Galván took part of the Mexico under-17 team. In the 2009 CONCACAF U17 Championship he scored 3 goals in 3 appearances. He scored his 4th goal in a match against Nigata and scored his 5th goal in a match against Japan in the tournament "International of soccer Nigata 2009." He missed the 2009 FIFA U-17 World Cup because he was reprimanded for indiscipline.

Galván has made 5 appearances for the under-20s, scoring 3 goals.
