= Jair Pereira (Mexican footballer) =

Mexican footballer (born 1986)

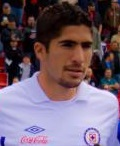
- Pereira with Cruz Azul in 2012

Personal information
- Full name: Jair Pereira Rodríguez
- Date of birth: 7 July 1986 (age 40)
- Place of birth: Cuautla, Morelos, Mexico
- Height: 1.83 m (6 ft 0 in)
- Position: Centre-back

Senior career*
Years	Team	Apps	(Gls)
2007–2008	Tampico Madero	21	(0)
2008–2011	Cruz Azul Hidalgo	83	(4)
2011–2013	Cruz Azul	56	(2)
2014–2019	Guadalajara	131	(5)
2019–2020	Querétaro	16	(3)
2020–2021	Necaxa	12	(0)

International career
2013–2017	Mexico	7	(0)
- * Club domestic league appearances and goals

Jair Pereira Rodríguez (born 7 July 1986) is a Mexican former professional footballer who played as a centre-back.

== Club career ==
=== Tampico Madero ===
Arose from the reserve side of Tampico Madero where he joined in 2004, playing in Ascenso MX debut in the first team on 15 September 2007 at the Tiburones Rojos de Coatzacoalcos.

=== Cruz Azul ===
After having played with Cruz Azul's reserve side, Pereira made his professional debut in the Liga MX Apertura 2011 under coach Enrique Meza as a starter against C.F. Pachuca August 3, 2011. He played all the Clausura 2012 season and as a permanent fixture forming a solid defense with Nestor Araujo On February 4, 2012, he scored his first goal against Chiapas F.C. in a winning 2–0 confrontation. On April 24, 2012, he scored his second goal against Club América in a 2–2 draw; he was sent off with a red card later in the match.

=== Guadalajara ===
On December 12, 2013, he signed with C.D. Guadalajara with a reported US$3 million transfer fee. He scored his first goal during the 2014 Apertura season against UdeG in a 3–0 win.

=== Querétaro ===
On 27 June 2019, Pereira joined Querétaro.

== Career statistics ==
=== International ===
As of match played 6 September 2017

Mexico
Year	Apps	Goals
2013	1	0
2017	6	0
Total	7	0

== Honours ==
Cruz Azul

- Copa MX: Clausura 2013

Guadalajara

- Liga MX: Clausura 2017
- Copa MX: Apertura 2015, Clausura 2017
- Supercopa MX: 2016
- CONCACAF Champions League: 2018

== See also ==
- List of people from Morelos
