= Alan Vidal =

Mexican footballer (born 1993)

Personal information
- Full name: Alan Emmanuel Vidal Solís
- Date of birth: 18 March 1993 (age 33)
- Place of birth: Zacualpan, Morelos, Mexico
- Height: 1.78 m (5 ft 10 in)
- Position: Defender

Youth career
- 2010–2014: Cruz Azul

Senior career*
Years	Team	Apps	(Gls)
2014–2020	Cruz Azul Hidalgo	46	(6)
2014	→ Real Cuautitlán (loan)	2	(0)
2015–2017	→ Zacatepec (loan)	18	(1)
2017–2018	→ Halcones de Morelos (loan)	26	(1)
2021	Mineros de Zacatecas	1	(0)
- * Club domestic league appearances and goals as of 27 August 2019

Alan Emmanuel Vidal Solís (born March 18, 1993), known as Alan Vidal, is a Mexican professional association football (soccer) player who plays for Cruz Azul Hidalgo.

== See also ==
- List of people from Morelos
