= Maranhão (footballer, born 1990) =

Brazilian footballer

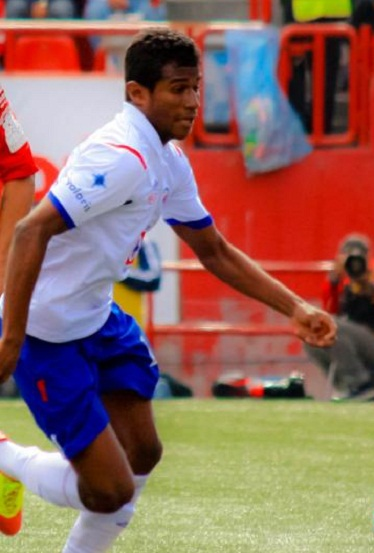

Personal information
- Full name: Francinilson Santos Meirelles
- Date of birth: 3 May 1990 (age 36)
- Place of birth: São Luís, Brazil
- Height: 1.69 m (5 ft 7 in)
- Position: Attacking midfielder

Team information
- Current team: Santa Cruz

Youth career
- 2007: Madureira
- 2008: Cruzeiro

Senior career*
Years	Team	Apps	(Gls)
2009	Itaúna	15	(0)
2010–2011	Bahia	27	(1)
2012–2014	Cruz Azul	38	(1)
2013	→ Atlético Paranaense (loan)	8	(0)
2014	→ Daejeon Citizen (loan)	16	(0)
2015–2016	Chapecoense	63	(3)
2016–2018	Fluminense	23	(1)
2017	→ Ponte Preta (loan)	9	(0)
2018	→ Goias (loan)	48	(4)
2019	CSA	11	(1)
2020	Mirassol	9	(1)
2020	Operário Ferroviário	22	(0)
2021	São Bernardo	12	(0)
2021	Criciúma	18	(0)
2022	Chapecoense	19	(0)
2023–	Santa Cruz	11	(1)
- * Club domestic league appearances and goals as of 23:09, 24 June 2019 (UTC)

Francinilson Santos Meirelles (born 3 May 1990 in São Luís, Maranhão), commonly known as Maranhão, is a Brazilian footballer who plays for Santa Cruz as an attacking midfielder.

== Honours ==
Daejeon Citizen

- K League Challenge: 2014

Chapecoense

- Campeonato Catarinense: 2016
