= Luis Alanís =

Mexican footballer (born 1990)

Personal information
- Full name: Luis Javier Alanís Ávalos
- Date of birth: 17 July 1990 (age 36)
- Place of birth: Mexico City, Mexico
- Height: 1.72 m (5 ft 7 1/2 in)
- Position: Midfielder

Youth career
- –2008: Cruz Azul

Senior career*
Years	Team	Apps	(Gls)
2008–2009	Cruz Azul Lagunas		
2009–2010	Cruz Azul	0	(0)
2011–2012	Cruz Azul Jasso		
- * Club domestic league appearances and goals

Luis Javier Alanís Ávalos (Note: In this Spanish name, the first or paternal surname is Alanís and the second or maternal family name is Ávalos.) (born 17 July 1990) is a Mexican former football midfielder.
