= Diego Martínez (footballer, born 1993) =

Mexican footballer

Personal information
- Full name: Diego Israel Martínez Monroy
- Date of birth: August 7, 1993 (age 33)
- Place of birth: Mexico City, Mexico
- Height: 1.69 m (5 ft 6 1/2 in)
- Position: Striker

Team information
- Current team: Cruz Azul
- Number: 72

Youth career
- 2003–2012: Cruz Azul

Senior career*
Years	Team	Apps	(Gls)
2012–2017	Cruz Azul	0	(0)
- * Club domestic league appearances and goals

Diego Martínez (born August 6, 1993, in Mexico City) is a Mexican former footballer.

== Career ==
In 2011 Martínez was the winner of the 2nd season of Football Cracks, a reality show looking for players to realize their dreams of playing professional football, led by Zinedine Zidane and Enzo Francescoli. As a result of winning the contest, Martínez won the right to play and train with Real Madrid Castilla.
