= Héctor Gutiérrez =

Mexican footballer (born 1986)

Personal information
- Full name: Héctor Enrique Gutiérrez Ramírez
- Date of birth: August 29, 1986 (age 40)
- Place of birth: Toluca, Estado de México, Mexico
- Height: 1.75 m (5 ft 9 in)
- Position: Midfielder

Team information
- Current team: América U21 (Assistant)

Senior career*
Years	Team	Apps	(Gls)
2008–2014	Cruz Azul	51	(0)
2008–2014	→ Cruz Azul Hidalgo	70	(2)
2015–2017	Zacatepec	48	(0)
2017–2018	Potros UAEM	4	(0)

Managerial career
- 2019–2020: Alebrijes de Oaxaca (Assistant)
- 2021–2022: Pumas Tabasco (Assistant)
- 2023–2025: Cruz Azul U19
- 2026–: América U21 (Assistant)
- * Club domestic league appearances and goals as of 16 August 2017

Héctor Enrique Gutiérrez (born August 29, 1986) is a former Mexican professional footballer. He last played as a midfielder for Potros UAEM.

== Career ==
Gutiérrez began playing football in Cruz Azul's youth system. He made his Primera Division debut in 2008, but found limited opportunities to play for the first team due to the performances of Gerardo Torrado, Christian Riveros and Benjamín Galindo.
