= Adrián Cortés =

Mexican footballer (born 1983)

Personal information
- Full name: Adrián Cortés Valdovino
- Date of birth: November 19, 1983 (age 42)
- Place of birth: Mexico City, Mexico
- Height: 1.75 m (5 ft 9 in)
- Position: Defender

Senior career*
Years	Team	Apps	(Gls)
2003–2013	Cruz Azul	65	(3)
2008	→ Coronel Bolognesi (loan)	18	(0)
2008–2009	→ Tecos UAG (loan)	13	(0)
2013	Guadalajara	3	(0)
2013–2014	→ Veracruz (loan)	30	(0)
2014–2015	Veracruz	26	(0)
2015–2017	Puebla	2	(0)
2016	→ Cafetaleros (loan)	14	(0)

International career
2003	Mexico U20	1	(0)

Managerial career
- 2019: Oaxaca Reserves and Academy
- 2019–2023: Cruz Azul Reserves and Academy
- * Club domestic league appearances and goals

Adrián Cortés Valdovino (born November 19, 1983) is a Mexican professional football coach and a former defender.

== Cruz Azul ==
He made his debut April 6, 2003, against Deportivo Toluca, a game which resulted in a 3–1 victory for Cruz Azul. Adrián Cortés was on Cruz Azul's bench for 4 years, only being able to participate in 23 games (9 games as starter, 5 of them being in the Primera División Apertura 2003) in his entire stay at Cruz Azul. Primera División Apertura 2003 was his most active season in Cruz Azul, but unfortunately, the Mexican defender could not find a permanent spot in the team that had brought him up.

== Coronel Bolognesi ==
Juan Reynoso, former Cruz Azul player, took Adrian Cortes to his Peruvian team, Coronel Bolognesi. Adrian Cortes did not let the opportunity slip, which even gave him the possibility to play in Copa Libertadores, the most prestigious CONMEBOL club-based tournament. His visit to Peru lasted only a semester, Adrian Cortes played for Tecos UAG in 2008. He then played for Cruz Azul Hidalgo in 2009.
