= Alejandro Vela =

Mexican footballer (born 1984)

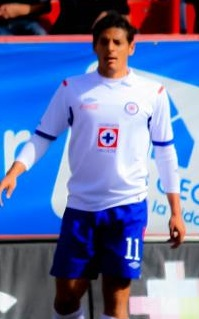
- Vela with Cruz Azul in 2012

Personal information
- Full name: Manuel Alejandro Vela Garrido
- Date of birth: 28 March 1984 (age 42)
- Place of birth: Cancún, Quintana Roo, Mexico
- Height: 1.72 m (5 ft 8 in)
- Position: Winger

Senior career*
Years	Team	Apps	(Gls)
2003–2006	Guadalajara	42	(3)
2006–2008	Chiapas	63	(11)
2008–2015	Cruz Azul	136	(12)
2013–2014	→ Atlante (loan)	31	(1)
2015	→ Minnesota United (loan)	9	(0)
2016	→ Necaxa (loan)	16	(0)
2017–2020	Venados	48	(0)
Total		345	(27)
- * Club domestic league appearances and goals

Manuel Alejandro Vela Garrido (born 28 March 1984) is a Mexican former professional footballer who played as a winger.

== Career ==
He made his debut on 14 August 2004, for Chivas against Atlante. He played for fellow Liga MX team Chiapas from 2006 to 2008 before moving to Cruz Azul where he would enjoy the most personal and club success, scoring 30 goals across all competitions and appearing the FIFA Club World Cup, the CONCACAF Champions League and the Copa Libertadores. Between 2015 and 2017 he moved between several clubs, including Minnesota United of the North American Soccer League. In 2017 he signed with Mexican second division club Venados and played with them until his retirement in July 2020.

== Personal life ==
His younger brother, Carlos Vela, is also a former professional footballer, who previously played for clubs including Real Sociedad, Arsenal and Los Angeles FC.
