= Fausto Pinto =

Mexican footballer (born 1983)

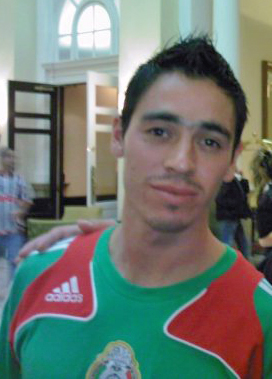
- Pinto in 2009

Personal information
- Full name: Fausto Manuel Pinto Rosas
- Date of birth: 8 August 1983 (age 43)
- Place of birth: Culiacán, Sinaloa, Mexico
- Height: 1.66 m (5 ft 5 in)
- Position: Left-back

Team information
- Current team: Atlético Pachuca (Manager)

Senior career*
Years	Team	Apps	(Gls)
2001–2008	Pachuca	187	(3)
2009–2016	Cruz Azul	181	(1)
2013	→ Toluca (loan)	28	(0)
2016	→ Lobos BUAP (loan)	15	(0)
2017–2018	Dorados	23	(0)
Total		434	(4)

International career
2003	Mexico U20	3	(1)
2007–2010	Mexico	25	(0)

Managerial career
- 2022–: Atlético Pachuca
Medal record
Representing Mexico
CONCACAF Gold Cup
Winner	CONCACAF Gold Cup	2009
Runner-up	CONCACAF Gold Cup	2007
Third place	Copa América	2007
- * Club domestic league appearances and goals

Fausto Manuel Pinto Rosas (born 8 August 1983) is a Mexican former professional footballer who played as a left-back.

== Club career ==
On December 23, 2008, Pinto left C.F. Pachuca and started playing with Cruz Azul. Hugo Sánchez, Mexican coach asked for Fausto Pinto's services for the 2007 CONCACAF Gold Cup held in the United States. However, Pinto's debut did not happen until the 2007 Copa América against Brazil in a 2–0 win.

== Honours ==
Pachuca

- Mexican Primera División: Invierno 2001, Apertura 2003, Clausura 2006, Clausura 2007
- CONCACAF Champions' Cup: 2002, 2007, 2008
- North American SuperLiga: 2007
- Copa Sudamericana: 2006

Cruz Azul

- CONCACAF Champions League: 2013–14

Mexico

- CONCACAF Gold Cup: 2009

Individual

- CONCACAF Gold Cup All-Tournament Team: 2009
