= Emanuel Villa =

Argentine footballer (born 1982)

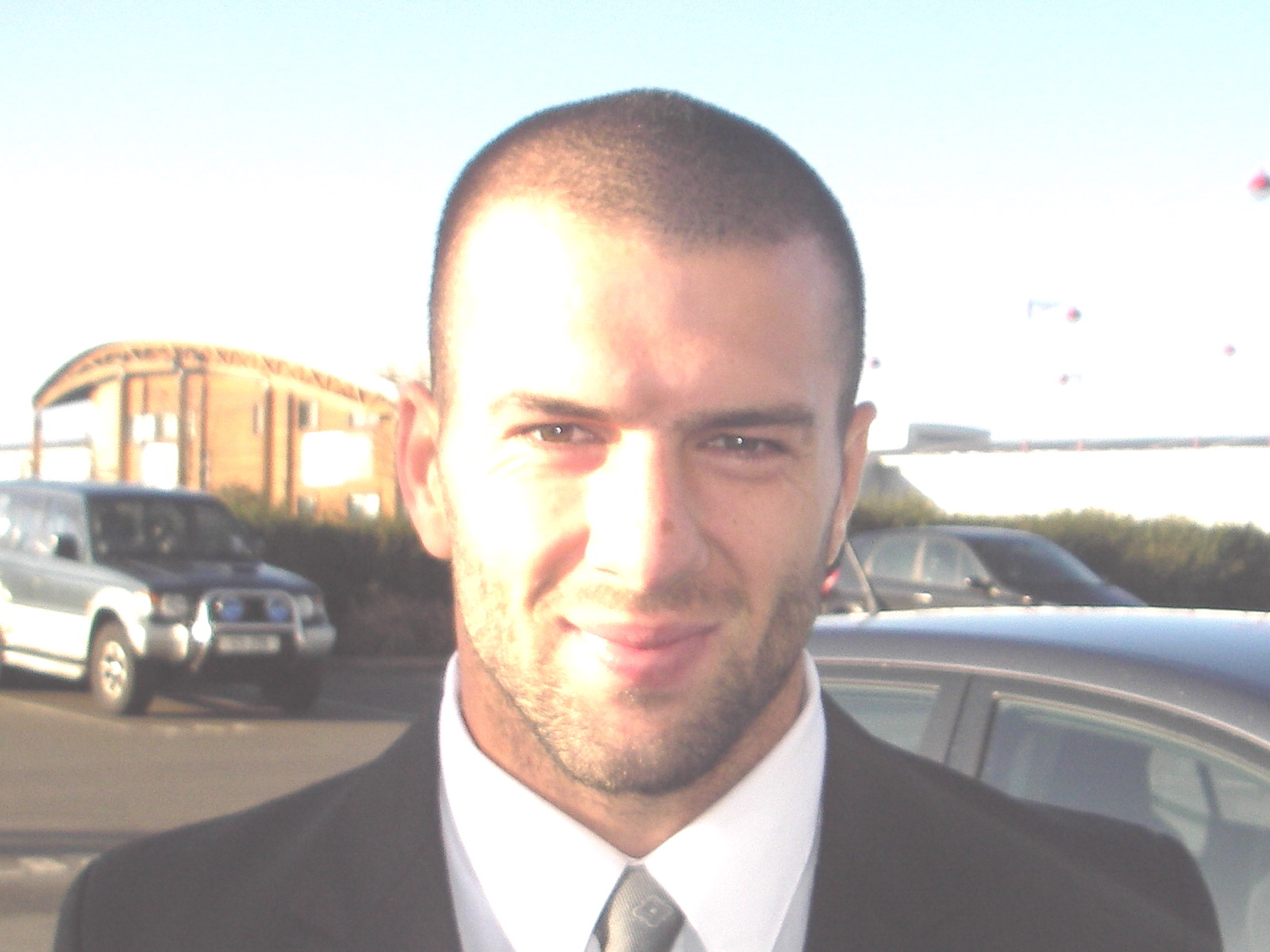
- Villa in the English city of Derby

Personal information
- Full name: Emanuel Alejandro Villa
- Date of birth: 24 February 1982 (age 44)
- Place of birth: Casilda, Santa Fe, Argentina
- Height: 1.78 m (5 ft 10 in)
- Position: Centre-forward

Senior career*
Years	Team	Apps	(Gls)
2001–2003	Huracán	45	(10)
2003–2004	Atlético Rafaela	24	(10)
2004–2006	Rosario Central	43	(18)
2006–2007	Atlas	30	(15)
2007–2008	UAG	33	(13)
2008–2009	Derby County	46	(5)
2009–2012	Cruz Azul	93	(51)
2012	UNAM	13	(3)
2013–2015	UANL	42	(11)
2015	→ Querétaro (loan)	37	(18)
2016–2018	Querétaro	41	(10)
2018	→ Celaya (loan)	5	(1)
Total		452	(165)
- * Club domestic league appearances and goals

Emanuel Alejandro Villa (born 24 February 1982), commonly known as "Tito Villa", is an Argentine former professional footballer. He is a Mexican naturalized citizen.

He previously played for Huracán, Atlético Rafaela and Rosario Central in Argentina; Derby County in England; and Atlas, Tecos, Cruz Azul, Pumas UNAM, Tigres UANL and Querétaro in Mexico.

== Career ==
=== Early career in Argentina and Mexico ===
Villa started his career at Club Atlético Huracán in the Primera Division Argentina in 2001. In 2003, he was transferred to Atlético Rafaela but the club were relegated at the end of the 2003–2004 season after a losing a playoff with Huracán de Tres Arroyos.

After the disappointment of relegation with Rafaela, Villa returned to the Primera the following season by joining Rosario Central. In 2006, he was signed by Atlas in Guadalajara. Villa stayed in Guadalajara, after he was transferred to Tecos UAG for the Clausura 2007 tournament.

=== Derby County ===
Villa signed for Premier League side Derby County on 4 January 2008 in a £2million deal. The move proved to be a controversial one as César Luis Menotti, then coach of Tecos, was not informed of Villa being sold. Villa signed a 3 1/2-year contract with the Rams and made his debut in a 1–0 home defeat against Wigan Athletic. He scored his first goal on 2 February 2008, with a last minute headed equaliser from a Dean Leacock cross, in a 1–1 draw away at Birmingham City. His first home goals came with a brace in a 2–2 draw with Fulham on 29 March 2008. His first a deflection from a Dean Leacock shot, his second a header after Mile Sterjovski crossed. However, a draw was not enough to help Derby survive relegation. It was the earliest a team had been relegated from the Premier League.

Villa's first goal of the 08/09 season came against QPR as a substitute in a 2–0 away victory. On Sunday 2 November 2008, Villa scored an own-goal against Nottingham Forest, but exactly 10 minutes 12 seconds later Villa scored again, this time in the right goal, the game ended 1–1. Two days later Villa scored his first hat-trick for Derby; in a League Cup game against Brighton, becoming only the third player in 10 years to score three goals in one game for Derby. In the fourth round of the League Cup he scored again to claim his sixth goal of the season this time against Leeds United. Derby won the match 2–1 to book themselves in the quarter-finals on the competition. Despite this, Villa could not command a regular position in the Derby County line-up and, after Jewell was replaced by Nigel Clough he was deemed surplus to requirements, and revealed his desire to return to Mexico due to his wife's homesickness. He left Derby for £1.7 million. He made 53 appearances and scored 9 goals for The Rams.

=== Return to Mexico ===
On 30 June 2009 he was linked with a move to Mexican club Cruz Azul . and on 1 July it was revealed that a fee rumoured to be of £1.7m had been agreed for Villa, and he signed for the club on 2 July 2009.

Villa enjoyed a successful start to his Cruz Azul career, his first goals of the Mexico Apertura season came in a 3–0 win at Pumas UNAM and a brace in a 2–0 win over CF Monterrey. His first goal in the 2009–10 CONCACAF Champions League came in a 6–2 away victory at Herdiano.

On 22 August Villa played his first Mexico City Derby match "Clasico Joven", between Cruz Azul and Club America, the match ended 2–3 in favor of the visitors, but "Tito" scored the partial 1–1, at the 41 minutes, then easily put away the goalkeeper Guillermo Ochoa to score his 5th goal in 5 matches during his first season as a Cruz Azul player.

Villa scored four goals on 19 September 2009, in a game Cruz Azul won 4–2, over "Gladiadores" de San Luis. This was the first time he scored more than three goals in a game, the first three being for Derby County in a League Cup match against Brighton & Hove Albion.. After this game he has 10 goals in the tournament, and averages 1.1 goals per match. Villa scored 2 more goals against Atlante F.C. making him the leader of the Apertura 2009 with 13 goals. On 7 November, he scored another couple of goals against Puebla FC with a 4–0 score, and in another match against Pachuca he scored once, having now 19 goals, above other players as Miguel Sabah, Salvador Cabañas, Humberto Suazo, Héctor Mancilla and Javier Hernández

Villa scored his first goal in el torneo Bicentenario against his former team Atlas in a 3–1 win. He then began his goal streak scoring in the next game against San Luis in a 2–1 win. He then scored his first pair against Toluca in a 3–2 win.

As of July 2011, Emanuel Villa has become one of the Top All-Time Scorers for Cruz Azul Team with 50 goals for the team. On 19 May 2012, his contract with Cruz Azul was over and both parties weren't able to end on an agreement, and on 24 May 2012 he was transferred to Pumas UNAM.

==== Tigres UANL ====
On 15 November 2012, after a poor season with Pumas he signed with Tigres UANL. On 5 January 2013, Villa made his official league debut with Tigres against Chiapas scoring a hat trick in the Estadio Universitario. On 19 January 2013, Villa scored the goal for the victory of 1–0 of Tigres over Atlas de Guadalajara. Villa scored one goal and gave an assist to Danilinho to the second goal in the victory of 2–0 of Tigres over Queretaro F.C. in the Estadio Corregidora on 26 January 2013. On 10 February 2013, Villa scored one goal against Toluca for the victory of 4–1, in the Estadio Nemesio Díez. On 23 February 2013, Villa scored for the first time on his career against his former team Cruz Azul. He scored the two goals of the victory of 2–1, at the Estadio Azul. On 28 February 2013, while training, Villa suffered from a strain on his left calf. He missed five games. On 14 April 2013, he scored once more against a former team, this time to Pumas UNAM at the Estadio Olímpico Universitario in the defeat of Tigres by 2–1. On 6 July 2013, Villa scored one goal for the victory of 5–1 against San Antonio Scorpions in a friendly game at the Toyota Field. On 18 September 2013, he scored a goal against Club Santos Laguna in the Copa MX at the Estadio Universitario for the 3–0 victory of Tigres. On 2 October 2013, Villa scored a goal against archrival C.F. Monterrey for the 2–2 draw in the Copa MX quarterfinals played at the Estadio Tecnológico. Due to past physical issues and looking for a full recovery, Villa did not play with Tigres the Clausura 2014 tournament. On mid-May, 2014, Villa reported as ready for the Apertura 2014 tournament. He scored a goal against Club León on the victory of Tigres by 4–2 at the Estadio Universitario on 26 July 2014, in the second game of the league regular season. Villa participated scoring the third goal of a 5–1 victory over Monarcas Morelia at the Estadio Morelos, heading in a cross from Darío Burbano on a league game on 22 August 2014.

=== Querétaro ===
On 29 December 2015, Querétaro announced that they reached an agreement with the player to sign him in a two-year contract with an option of one more at the end of the perspective one.

=== Celaya ===
On 14 December 2017, Celaya announced the arrival of Villa on loan from Querétaro.

== Goals with Cruz Azul ==
Appearances and goals for Cruz Azul as of 19 April 2012.

Club	Season	League		Liguilla		CONCACAF		Libertadores		Total	
Club	Season	Apps	Goals	Apps	Goals	Apps	Goals	Apps	Goals	Apps	Goals
Cruz Azul
Cruz Azul	2009–10	33	23	6	2	9	3	-	-	48	28
Cruz Azul	2010–11	34	14	6	1	9	8	-	-	49	23
Cruz Azul	2011–12	26	14	2	0	-	-	5	1	33	15
Total	-	93	51	14	3	18	11	5	1	130	66

== Personal life ==
Villa and his wife Virginia have two children, Alessandro and Stefano. His nickname "Tito", was given by his grandfather. He is a fan of his former team Rosario Central.

== Honours ==
=== Club ===
Querétaro

- Copa MX: Apertura 2016
- Supercopa MX: 2017

=== Individual ===
- Liga MX Golden Boot (2): Apertura 2009, Apertura 2015
- CONCACAF Champions League Golden Boot: 2015–16
