= 2010–11 Cruz Azul season =

Cruz Azul
2010–11 season
- President: Guillermo Álvarez Cuevas
- Head coach: Enrique Meza
- Stadium: Estadio Azul
- Primera División: Apertura: 1st (Quarter-finals); Clausura: 5th (Semi-finals)
- CONCACAF Champions League: Semi-finals
- Top goalscorer: League: Christian Giménez (17); All: Emanuel Villa (23)
- Highest home attendance: 35,161 vs. América (3 October 2010), UNAM (20 November 2010) & (22 January 2011) & Guadalajara (23 April 2011)
- Lowest home attendance: 5,000 vs. San Francisco (3 August 2010)
- Average home league attendance: 24,275
Home colours	Away colours	Third colours

The 2010–11 Deportivo Cruz Azul season was the 84th season in the football club's history and the 46th consecutive season in the top flight of Mexican football. The season was split into two tournaments—the Torneo Apertura and the Torneo Clausura—each with identical formats and each contested by the same eighteen teams. Cruz Azul began their season on July 23, 2010, against Estudiantes Tecos. Cruz Azul played their homes games on Saturdays at 17:00 hours local time.

== Club ==
=== Personnel ===
Position	Staff
Chairman	(Mexico) Guillermo Álvarez Cuevas
Sports Manager	(Chile) Alberto Quintano

=== Coaching staff ===
Position	Staff
Head Coach	(Mexico) Enrique Meza
Assistant Coach	(Mexico) Eugenio Villazón
Assistant Coach	(Mexico) Enrique Meza Salinas
Assistant Coach	(Mexico) Jorge Garcia
Goalkeeping Coach	(Mexico) Carlos Perez
Team doctor	(Mexico) Alfonso Jiménez
Physical & Fitness coach	(Uruguay) Daniel Ipata
Physiotherapist	(Mexico) Ernesto Rubio
Masseur	(Mexico) Antonio Ortiz
Masseur	(Mexico) Alejandro Ramírez
Stagehand	(Mexico) Pablo Coria
Stagehand	(Mexico) José Luis Coria
Stagehand	(Mexico) Silverio Rivera

=== Current Kit ===
Provider: Umbro
Sponsors: Cemento Cruz Azul, Coca-Cola, Telcel

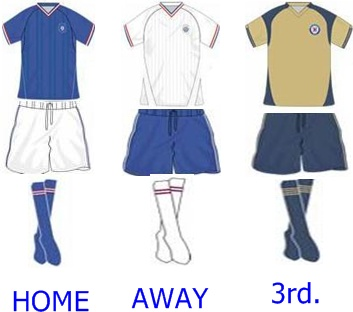

== Current squad ==
As of January 2011: Listed on the official website of Cruz Azul.

Note: Flags indicate national team as defined under FIFA eligibility rules; some limited exceptions apply. Players may hold more than one non-FIFA nationality.

No.	Pos.	Nation	Player
1	GK	MEX	José de Jesús Corona
2	DF	MEX	Fausto Pinto
3	MF	URU	Marcelo Palau
4	DF	MEX	Julio César Domínguez (vice-captain)
5	DF	MEX	Alejandro Castro
6	MF	MEX	Gerardo Torrado (captain)
8	MF	MEX	Gonzalo Pineda
9	FW	MEX	Isaac Romo
10	MF	ARG	Christian Giménez
11	FW	MEX	Alejandro Vela

No.	Pos.	Nation	Player
15	DF	MEX	Horacio Cervantes
16	DF	MEX	Rogelio Chávez (2nd vice-captain)
18	MF	MEX	César Villaluz (3rd vice-captain)
19	MF	CHI	Hugo Droguett
21	MF	MEX	Héctor Gutiérrez
22	DF	MEX	Adrián Cortés
25	GK	MEX	Yosgart Gutiérrez
26	DF	CHI	Waldo Ponce
27	FW	MEX	Javier Orozco
30	FW	ARG	Emanuel Villa

=== From youth system ===
Note: Flags indicate national team as defined under FIFA eligibility rules; some limited exceptions apply. Players may hold more than one non-FIFA nationality.

No.	Pos.	Nation	Player
7	MF	MEX	Javier Aquino
12	GK	MEX	Guillermo Allison
13	MF	MEX	Allam Bello
14	DF	MEX	Nestor Araújo
17	MF	MEX	Diego de la Cruz

No.	Pos.	Nation	Player
20	DF	MEX	Germán Rodríguez
23	DF	MEX	Hiram Mondragón
24	MF	MEX	Luis Alanis
28	DF	MEX	Gienir García
29	FW	MEX	Martín Galván

== Transfers ==
=== Summer ===
==== In and Loan ====
No.	Position	Natyionality	Player	From	Type of Transfer	Fee	Note
8	MF	(Mexico)	Gonzalo Pineda	(Mexico) San Luis	loan	"N/A"	
7	MF	(Mexico)	Javier Aquino	Youth system	"N/A"	"N/A"	
12	GK	(Mexico)	Guillermo Allison	Youth system	"N/A"	"N/A"	
13	MF	(Mexico)	Allam Bello	Youth system	"N/A"	"N/A"	
14	DF	(Mexico)	Nestor Araújo	Youth system	"N/A"	"N/A"	
17	MF	(Mexico)	Diego De la Cruz	Youth system	"N/A"	"N/A"	
20	MF	(Mexico)	Germán Rodríguez	Youth system	"N/A"	"N/A"	
23	DF	(Mexico)	Hiram Mondragón	Youth system	"N/A"	"N/A"	
24	MF	(Mexico)	Luis Alanis	Youth system	"N/A"	"N/A"	
28	DF	(Mexico)	Gienir García	Youth system	"N/A"	"N/A"	

==== Out and Loan ====
Position	Natyionality	Player	To	Fee	Type of Transfer	Note
MF	(Mexico)	Edgar Gerardo Lugo	(Mexico) Puebla	Undisclosed	"N/A"	
FW	(Mexico)	Mario Ortiz	(Mexico) Puebla	Undisclosed	"N/A"	
DF	(Mexico)	Félix Ísael González	(Mexico) Puebla	Undisclosed	"N/A"	
DF	(Mexico)	Melvin Brown	(Mexico) Puebla	Undisclosed	"N/A"	
MF	(Paraguay)	Cristian Riveros	(England) Sunderland	Free	"N/A"	
MF	(Mexico)	Israel López	(Mexico) Necaxa	Undisclosed	"N/A"	
MF	(Mexico)	Jaime Lozano	(Mexico) Monarcas	Undisclosed	"N/A"	
MF	(Mexico)	Gabino Velasco	(Mexico) Querétaro	Undisclosed	"N/A"	
GK	(Mexico)	Julio César Valdivia	Unknown	"N/A"	"N/A"	
DF	(Brazil)	Edcarlos	(Brazil) Cruzeiro	Undisclosed	"N/A"	

=== Winter ===
==== In and Loan ====
No.	Position	Natyionality	Player	From	Type of Transfer	Fee	Note
19	MF	(Chile)	Hugo Droguett	(Mexico) Monarcas Morelia	"N/A"	"N/A"	
3	MF	(Uruguay)	Marcelo Palau	(Uruguay) Nacional	"N/A"	"N/A"	
9	FW	(Mexico)	Isaac Romo	(Mexico) Querétaro	"N/A"	"N/A"	
TBA	DF	(Chile)	Waldo Ponce	(Spain) Racing de Santander	"N/A"	"N/A"	

==== Out and Loan ====
Position	Natyionality	Player	To	Fee	Type of Transfer	Note
DF	(Mexico)	Joel Huiqui	(Mexico) Monarcas	Undisclosed	"N/A"	
FW	(Argentina)	Maximiliano Biancucchi	(Paraguay) Olimpia	Undisclosed	"N/A"	

== Competitions ==
Cruz Azul play three different tournaments in the 2010–11 season are Apertura 2010, CONCACAF Champions League and Clausura 2011.

=== Overall ===
Competition	Started round	Current position / round	Final position / round	First match	Last match
Apertura 2010	—	—	1^{st.} /Quarter-finals	23 July 2010	20 November 2010
Champions League	Preliminary round	—	Semi-finals	27 July 2010	6 April 2011
Clausura 2011	—	—	5^{th.} /Semi-finals	8 January 2011	15 May 2011

== Competitions statistics ==
=== 2010 Torneo Apertura ===
Kickoff times are in CTZ or CST=UTC−06:00 and DST=UTC−05:00.

==== 2010 Summer pre-season ====
Before the season Win Draw Loss

June 18, 2010 Friendly	Cruz Azul	2 – 0	Cruz Azul Jasso	Mexico City, Mexico
				Stadium: La Noria, D.F.

June 26, 2010 Friendly	Cruz Azul	2 – 0	Cruz Azul Hidalgo	Mexico City, Mexico
				Stadium: La Noria, D.F.

June 30, 2010 Friendly	Cruz Azul	5 – 2	Cruz Azul Hidalgo	Mexico City, Mexico
				Stadium: La Noria, D.F.

July 3, 2010 Friendly	Cruz Azul	3 – 0	Albinegros	Hidalgo, Mexico
4:00 pm				Stadium: Estadio 10 de Diciembre

July 7, 2010 Friendly	Tijuana	2 – 1	Cruz Azul	Baja California, Mexico
6:00 pm				Stadium: Estadio Caliente

July 10, 2010 Friendly	Cruz Azul	1 – 2	America	Pasadena, California, USA
7:00 pm				Stadium: Rose Bowl (stadium)

July 14, 2010 Friendly	Cruz Azul	0 – 1	Olimpia	Charlotte, North Carolina USA
7:30 pm				Stadium: American Legion Memorial Stadium

July 17, 2010 Friendly	Cruz Azul	1 – 1	Águila	Durham County, North Carolina USA
7:30 pm				Stadium: Durham County Stadium

Friendly during the season

September 3, 2010 Friendly	Cruz Azul	1 – 0	Lobos BUAP	Mexico City, Mexico
11:30				Stadium: Estadio Azul

Win Draw Loss

==== Regular phase ====
July 23, 2010 Round 1	Estudiantes Tecos	0 – 3	Cruz Azul	Zapopan, Jalisco, Mexico
20:00 DST	Medina (yellow card) 44'; Alanis (yellow card) 58'	Report; Live TV:	2', 34' Orozco; 45' (o.g.) Partida	Stadium: Estadio Tres de Marzo; Referee: (Chihuahua (state)) Genaro Medrano

July 31, 2010 Round 2	Cruz Azul	2 – 0	Atlante	Mexico City, Mexico
17:00 DST	Vela 30'; Giménez (yellow card) 47'; Villa 73'	Report; Live TV:	(yellow card) 44' Venegas; (yellow card) 55' Mármol; (yellow card) 58' Cardaccio; (yellow card) 74' Fano; (yellow card) 85' Torres	Stadium: Estadio Azul; Attendance: (Approximate unofficial) 20,000; Referee: (Guerrero) Miguel Ángel Chacón

August 8, 2010 Round 3	UNAM	2 – 0	Cruz Azul	Mexico City, Mexico
12:00 DST	Castro (yellow card) 24'; Palacios 35'; Nieto (yellow card) 64'; Chiapas (yellow card) 67'; Cortés (yellow card) 81'; Cortés 85'	Report; Live TV:	(yellow card) 25' Vela; (yellow card) 34' Pinto; (yellow card) 38' Torrado; (yellow card) 82' Cervantes	Stadium: Estadio Olímpico Universitario; Referee: (Aguascalientes) Ricardo Arellano

August 14, 2010 Round 4	Cruz Azul	4 – 1	Pachuca	Mexico City, Mexico
17:00 DST	Orozco 7', 50'; Pineda (yellow card) 9'; Torrado (yellow card) 35'; Villa 41'; Martinez 60' (o.g.)	Report; Live TV:	(yellow card) 2' Aguilar; (yellow card) 21' Martinez; (yellow card) 35' Manso; 65' (pen.) Benítez; (yellow card) 86' Gomez; (yellow card) 88' Rodríguez	Stadium: Estadio Azul; Attendance: (Approximate unofficial) 22,000; Referee: (Mexico City) Benito Archundia

August 21, 2010 Round 5	Chiapas	2 – 3	Cruz Azul	Tuxtla Gutierrez, Chiapas, Mexico
17:00 DST	Razo (yellow card) 13'; Rodríguez 29'; Andrade 49'; Zamora (yellow card) 71'; Valdéz (yellow card) 71'	Report; Live TV:	(yellow card) 9' Huiqui; 15', 62', 77' Giménez; (yellow card) 80' Villa	Stadium: Estadio Victor Manuel Reyna; Referee: (Mexico City) Julio David Escobar

August 28, 2010 Round 6	Cruz Azul	3 – 2	UANL	Mexico City, Mexico
17:00pm DST	Villa 10'; Torrado (yellow card) 12'; Orozco 42'; Vela 52'	Report; Live TV:	11', 56' Itamar; (yellow card) 38' Molina; (yellow card) 28' (yellow-red card) 89' Torres Nilo; (yellow card) 90+2' Acosta	Stadium: Estadio Azul; Attendance: (Approximate unofficial) 19,000; Referee: (Michoacán) Francisco Chacon Gutierrez

September 11, 2010 Round 7	Atlas	1 – 3	Cruz Azul	Guadalajara, Jalisco, Mexico
21:00 DST	Chávez (yellow card) 44'; Alférez (yellow card) 65'; Torres 75'; Moreno (yellow card) 78'	Report; Live TV:	17' (yellow card) 59' (yellow-red card) 83' Crevantes; 33' Orozco; (yellow card) 40' (goal) 88' Giménez; (yellow card) 90' García	Stadium: Estadio Jalisco; Referee: (Mexico City) José Alfredo Peñaloza

September 18, 2010 Round 8	Cruz Azul	3 – 0	Querétaro	Mexico City, Mexico
17:00 DST	Villa 27'; Biancucchi 33'; Huiqui (yellow card) 65'; Cortés 90+1'	Report; Live TV:	(yellow card) 24' Blanco; (yellow card) 90' Beltrán	Stadium: Estadio Azul; Attendance: (Approximate unofficial) 32,000; Referee: (Mexico City) Fernando Guerrero Ramírez

September 24, 2010 Round 9	Necaxa	2 – 1	Cruz Azul	Aguascalientes, Mexico
20:00 DST	Gandín 11' (pen.); López (yellow card) 23'; Pavlovich 36'; Palacios (yellow card) 65'; Mosqueda (yellow card) 69'; Barbosa (yellow card) 72'; Ledesma (yellow card) 88'	Report; Live TV:	(yellow card) 11' (yellow-red card) 90+4' Corona; (yellow card) 31' Crevantes; (yellow card) 54' Torrado; 65' (pen.) Giménez; (yellow card) 90+1' Castro	Stadium: Estadio Victoria; Referee: (Sinaloa) Jesus Fabricio Morales

October 3, 2010 Round 10	Cruz Azul	1 – 0	America	Mexico City, Mexico
16:30 DST	Giménez 52'; Torrado (yellow card) 76'; Pineda (yellow card) 90+3'	Report; Live TV:	(yellow card) 4' Vuoso; (yellow card) 19' Martínez; (yellow card) 88' Reyna; (yellow card) 89' (red card) Rojas; (yellow card) 90+3' Mosquera	Stadium: Estadio Azul; Attendance: (Approximate unofficial) 35,161; Referee: (Mexico City) Marco Antonio Rodríguez

October 10, 2010 Round 11	Toluca	0 – 0	Cruz Azul	Toluca, State of Mexico, Mexico
12:00 DST	Novaretti (yellow card) 14' (yellow-red card) 40'; Ríos (yellow card) 31'; Méndez (yellow card) 45'; Dueñas (yellow card) 60'; Gamboa (yellow card) 66'	Report; Live TV:	(yellow card) 63' Aquino; (yellow card) 76' Torrado; (yellow card) 86' Crevantes	Stadium: Estadio Nemesio Díez; Referee: (Aguascalientes) Ricardo Arellano

October 16, 2010 Round 12	Cruz Azul	3 – 0	Santos Laguna	Mexico City, Mexico
17:00 DST	Vela 6'; Giménez (yellow card) 19' (goal) 88'; Pineda (yellow card) 20'; Cervantes 46'; Villa (yellow card) 90+1'	Report; Live TV:	(yellow card) 11' Olvera; (yellow card) 20' Quintero	Stadium: Estadio Azul; Attendance: (Approximate unofficial) 28,000; Referee: (Mexico City) Mauricio Morales

October 24, 2010 Round 13	Morelia	1 – 1	Cruz Azul	Morelia, Michoacán, Mexico
12:00 DST	Gastelum (yellow card) 14'; Noriega (yellow card) 44'; Aldrete (yellow card) 65'; Sabah 89'; Droguett (yellow card) 90+3'	Report; Live TV:	(yellow card) 60' Vela; 72' Aquino; (yellow card) 81' Torrado	Stadium: Estadio Morelos; Referee: (Mexico City) Jaime Herrera Garduño

October 27, 2010 Round 14	Monterrey	2 – 4	Cruz Azul	Monterrey, Nuevo León, Mexico
17:00 DST	S. Pérez (yellow card) 37'; De Nigris 40'; Pineda 53' (o.g.); Cardozo (yellow card) 76'; L. E. Pérez (yellow card) 90+1'	Report; Live TV:	31' (yellow card) 62' Castro; 33', 56' (yellow card) 52' Villaluz; (yellow card) 35' (goal) 44' Villa; (yellow card) 63' Pinto; (yellow card) 90' Giménez	Stadium: Estadio Tecnológico; Referee: (Mexico City) Miguel Angel Ayala

October 30, 2010 Round 15	Cruz Azul	1 – 0	Puebla	Mexico City, Mexico
17:00 DST	Giménez 80'; Cervantes (yellow card) 85'	Report; Live TV:	(yellow card) 25' Rincón; (yellow card) 40' Brown	Stadium: Estadio Azul; Attendance: (Approximate unofficial) 28,500; Referee: (Mexico City) Marco Antonio Rodríguez

November 6, 2010 Round 16	Guadalajara	0 – 0	Cruz Azul	Zapopan, Jalisco, Mexico
19:00 CST	Fabián (yellow card) 21'; Araujo (yellow card) 36'; Ponce (yellow card) 39' de Luna (yellow card) 79'; Sánchez (yellow card) 81'; Esparza (yellow card) 82'	Report; Live TV:	(yellow card) 16' Gutiérrez; (yellow card) 42' Castro; (yellow card) 82' Pinto	Stadium: Estadio Omnilife; Attendance: (Approximate unofficial) 30,801; Referee: (Jalisco) Román Rafael Medina

November 13, 2010 Round 17	Cruz Azul	1 – 0	San Luis	Mexico City, Mexico
17:00 CST	Cervantes (yellow card) 54' (goal) 88'	Report; Live TV:	(yellow card) 33' Matellán; (yellow card) 37' Torres	Stadium: Estadio Azul; Attendance: (Approximate unofficial) 28,800; Referee: (Mexico City) Jorge Eduardo Gasso

==== General table ====
Pos	Team	Pld	W	D	L	GF	GA	GD	Pts	Qualification
1	Cruz Azul	17	12	3	2	33	13	+20	39	2010-11 CONCACAF Champions League
2	Monterrey	17	9	5	3	29	20	+9	32	2010-11 CONCACAF Champions League
3	Santos Laguna	17	9	3	5	28	19	+9	30	2010-11 CONCACAF Champions League
4	América	17	7	6	4	22	16	+6	27	2011 Copa Libertadores Second Stage
5	San Luis	17	8	2	7	21	19	+2	26	2011 Copa Libertadores Second Stage

==== Group table ====
Group 3
Pos	Team	Pld	W	D	L	GF	GA	GD	Pts	Qualification
1	Cruz Azul	17	12	3	2	33	13	+20	39	Advanced to the Final Phase
2	Chiapas	17	6	7	4	21	14	+7	25	Advanced to the Final Phase
3	UNAM	17	7	4	6	23	24	−1	25	Advanced to the Final Phase
4	Morelia	17	5	6	6	17	16	+1	21	
5	Puebla	17	5	4	8	21	26	−5	19	
6	Querétaro	17	5	4	8	18	28	−10	19	

==== Final phase ====
Quarter-finals

November 17, 2010 First Leg	UNAM	1 – 2	Cruz Azul	Mexico City, Mexico
21:00 CST	López 19'; Chiapas (yellow card) 47'; Verón (yellow card) 66'; Bravo (yellow card) 90+1'	Report; Live TV:	(yellow card) 33' Cervantes; (yellow card) 43' (goal) 73' Giménez	Stadium: Estadio Olímpico Universitario; Referee: (Mexico City) Mauricio Morales

November 20, 2010 Second Leg	Cruz Azul	0 – 2 (2 – 3 agg.)	UNAM	Mexico City, Mexico
17:00 CST	Cervantes (yellow card) 22' (yellow-red card) 43'; Giménez (yellow card) 43'	Report; Live TV:	2' (yellow card) 43' Bravo; (yellow card) 43' Castro; 84' Cacho; (yellow card) 90+2' Palacios	Attendance: (Approximate unofficial) 35,161; Referee: (Mexico City) Marco Antonio Rodríguez

UNAM won 2–3 in aggregate.

=== CONCACAF Champions League ===
Win Draw Loss

Kickoff times are in CTZ or CST=UTC−06:00 and DST=UTC−05:00.

==== Preliminary round ====
July 27, 2010 First Leg	San Francisco (Panama)	2 – 3	(Mexico) Cruz Azul	La Chorrera, Panama City, Panama
21:00 DST	Jiménez 20' (yellow card) 72'; Phillips (yellow card) 30'; Algandona (yellow card) 33'; Torres 44'; Gonzalez (yellow card) 45'; White (yellow card) 56'	Report; Live TV: &	3', 54', 71' Villa; (yellow card) 42' Gutiérrez; (yellow card) 50' Pineda; (yellow card) 90' García	Stadium: Estadio Agustín Sánchez; Attendance: 725; Referee: Neal Brizan (Trinidad and Tobago)

August 3, 2010 Second Leg	Cruz Azul (Mexico)	6 – 0 (9 – 2 agg.)	(Panama) San Francisco	Mexico City, Mexico
19:00 DST	Orozco 11', 45', 84'; Biancucchi 18', 90+2'; Castro (yellow card) 33'; García 71'	Report; Live TV: &	(yellow card) 16' Phillips; (yellow card) 36' Torres	Stadium: Estadio Azul; Attendance: 5,000; Referee: Wálter Quesada (Costa Rica)

Cruz Azul won 9–2 in aggregate.

==== Group stage ====
August 17, 2010 Match Day 1	Toronto FC (Canada)	2 – 1	(Mexico) Cruz Azul	Toronto, Canada
19:00 DST	Šarić 3'; Mista 44'; Peterson (yellow card) 73'; De Rosario (yellow card) 90'	Report; Live TV: &	(yellow card) 21' Gutiérrez; (yellow card) 76' Pinto; (yellow card) 89' (goal) 90' Giménez; (yellow card) 90' Torrado	Stadium: BMO Field; Attendance: 16,862; Referee: Courtney Campbell (Jamaica)

August 25, 2010 Match Day 2	Cruz Azul (Mexico)	5 – 4	(United States) Real Salt Lake	Mexico City, Mexico
19:00 DST	Orozco 5', 76', 87', 89'; Biancucchi (yellow card) 18'; Cervantes (yellow card) 22'; Villa (yellow card) 90+1'; Giménez 90+3'	Report; Live TV: &	23' (pen.), 43' Saborío; (yellow card) 27' González; 64'Espíndola; (yellow card) 87' Findley; 90+2' Johnson	Stadium: Estadio Azul; Attendance: 6,156; Referee: Óscar Moncada (Honduras)

September 15, 2010 Match Day 3	Árabe Unido (Panama)	0 – 6	(Mexico) Cruz Azul	Panama City, Panama
19:00 DST	Cooper (yellow card) 60'; Mosquera (yellow card) 86'	Report; Live TV: &	10', 22', 27' Orozco; (yellow card) 58' (goal) 69', 81' Villa; 87' Biancucchi	Stadium: Estadio Rommel Fernández; Attendance: 2,975; Referee: Terry Vaughn (United States)

September 21, 2010 Match Day 4	Cruz Azul (Mexico)	0 – 0	(Canada) Toronto FC	Mexico City, Mexico
21:00 DST	Pinto (yellow card) 50' (yellow-red card) 80'; Torrado (yellow card) 88'	Report; Live TV: &	(yellow card) 20' de Guzman; (yellow card) 50' Ibrahim; (yellow card) 52' Garcia; (yellow card) 57' Lindsay; (yellow card) 78' Conway; (yellow card) 89' Gargan	Stadium: Estadio Azul; Attendance: 5,280; Referee: Juan Guerra (Guatemala)

September 28, 2010 Match Day 5	Cruz Azul (Mexico)	2 – 0	(Panama) Árabe Unido	Mexico City, Mexico
19:00 DST	Villa 1'; Pineda (yellow card) 40'; Cortés 47' (pen.); Gutiérrez (yellow card) 79'	Report; Live TV: &	(yellow card) 30' Anderson; (yellow card) 49' Cummings; (yellow card) 64' Mosquera; (yellow card) 70' Gondola	Stadium: Estadio Azul; Attendance: 5,015; Referee: Wálter Quesada (Costa Rica)

October 19, 2010 Match Day 6	Real Salt Lake (United States)	3 – 1	(Mexico) Cruz Azul	Sandy, Utah, USA
21:00 DST	Warner (yellow card) 22' (goal) 69'; Alexandre (yellow card) 35'; Araujo 43', 67'	Report; Live TV: &	(yellow card) 64' Huiqui; 71' Villaluz; (yellow card) 90' Giménez	Stadium: Rio Tinto Stadium; Attendance: 20,468; Referee: Joel Aguilar (El Salvador)

==== Group table ====
Group A
Team	Pld	W	D	L	GF	GA	GD	Pts	RSL	CRU	TOR	ÁRA
(United States) Real Salt Lake	6	4	1	1	17	11	+6	13		3–1	4–1	2–1
(Mexico) Cruz Azul	6	3	1	2	15	9	+6	10	5–4		0–0	2–0
(Canada) Toronto FC	6	2	2	2	5	7	−2	8	1–1	2–1		1–0
(Panama) Árabe Unido	6	1	0	5	4	14	−10	3	2–3	0–6	1–0	

Legend: Blue = home team win; Yellow = draw; Red = away team win.

==== Quarterfinals ====
February 22, 2011 First Leg	Cruz Azul (Mexico)	2 – 0	(Mexico) Santos Laguna	Mexico City, Mexico
21:00 CST	Torrado (yellow card) 17'; Orozco 58'; Villa (yellow card) 67'; Giménez 68'; Bello (yellow card) 77'	Report; Live TV:	(yellow card) 15' Baloy; (yellow card) 71' Arce	Stadium: Estadio Azul; Attendance: 14,062; Referee: Paul Delgadillo (Mexico)

March 1, 2011 Second Leg	Santos Laguna (Mexico)	1 - 3 (1 – 5 agg.)	(Mexico) Cruz Azul	Torreón, Coahuila, Mexico
19:00 CST	Peralta (yellow card) 29'; Benítez 71' (yellow card) 73'	Report; Live TV:	37', 53' Villa; 50' (yellow card) 57' (yellow-red card) 64' Giménez; (yellow card) 70' Ponce; (yellow card) 71' Palau	Stadium: Estadio Corona; Attendance: 25,000; Referee: Roberto Garcia O. (Mexico)

Cruz Azul won 5–1 in aggregate.

==== Semi-finals ====
March 16, 2011 First Leg	Monterrey (Mexico)	2 - 1	(Mexico) Cruz Azul	Monterrey, Nuevo León, Mexico
21:00 CST	Cardozo 9'; Santana (yellow card) 29' (goal) 55'; Basanta (yellow card) 47'; L. E. Pérez (yellow card) 51' de Nigris (yellow card) 79'	Report; Live TV:	(yellow card) 32' Villaluz; 48' Cortés; (yellow card) 69' Palau; (yellow card) 79' Droguett; (yellow card) 83' Cervantes	Stadium: Estadio Tecnológico; Attendance: 22,469; Referee: Paul Delgadillo (Mexico)

April 6, 2011 Second Leg	Cruz Azul (Mexico)	1 - 1 (2 - 3 agg.)	(Mexico) Monterrey	Mexico City, Mexico
19:00 DST	Villaluz 23'; Ponce (yellow card) 39' (yellow-red card) 78'; Orozco (yellow card) 63'	Report; Live TV:	(yellow card) 11' Zavala; (yellow card) 74' S. Pérez; 81' (pen.) Suazo	Stadium: Estadio Azul; Attendance: 24,574; Referee: Francisco Chacon (Mexico)

Monterrey won 3–2 in aggregate.

=== 2011 Torneo Clausura ===
Kickoff times are in CTZ or CST=UTC−06:00 and DST=UTC−05:00.

==== 2010 Winter pre-season ====
Before the season Win Draw Loss

December 21, 2010 Friendly	Cruz Azul	3 – 5	Estudiantes de Altamira	Mexico City, Mexico
11:00 CST				Stadium: La Noria, D.F.

December 23, 2010 Friendly	Cruz Azul	3 – 0	Pumas Morelos	Mexico City, Mexico
11:00 CST				Stadium: La Noria, D.F.

December 27, 2010 Friendly	Cruz Azul	3 – 0	Orizaba	Mexico City, Mexico
12:30 CST				Stadium: La Noria, D.F.

December 30, 2010 Friendly	Cruz Azul	3 – 1	Puebla	Mexico City, Mexico
12:00 CST				Stadium: Estadio Azul

January 5, 2011 Friendly	Cruz Azul	3 – 1	Cruz Azul Hidalgo	Mexico City, Mexico
11:30 CST				Stadium: La Noria, D.F.

Friendly during the season

January 18, 2011 Friendly	Universidad de Chile	0 – 2	(Mexico) Cruz Azul	Santiago, Chile
22:30 UTC−04:00	Vargas (yellow card) 69'; Díaz (yellow card) 83'	Report	78' (yellow card) 78' Orozco; 85' Ponce	Stadium: Nacional de Chile; Attendance: (Approximate unofficial) 28,000; Referee: (Chile) Enrique Osses

Win Draw Loss

==== Regular phase ====
January 8, 2011 Round 1	Cruz Azul	4 – 1	Estudiantes Tecos	Mexico City, Mexico
17:00 CST	Villa 6'; Giménez 15'; Domínguez (yellow card) 28'; Palau 37'; Pineda 86'; Torrado (yellow card) 87'	Report; Live TV:	(yellow card) 10' Jiménez; (yellow card) 14' López; 18' Cejas; (yellow card) 29' Antunez; (yellow card) 43' Zamogilny; (yellow card) 49' Cabral; (yellow card) 53' Partida; (yellow card) 85' Martínez	Stadium: Estadio Azul; Attendance: (Approximate unofficial) 15,000; Referee: (Aguascalientes) Jorge Macias

January 15, 2011 Round 2	Atlante	3 – 0	Cruz Azul	Cancún, Quintana Roo, Mexico
21:00 CST	Navarro (yellow card) 22'; Alfaro (yellow card) 40'; Bermúdez 71'; Maldonado 75'	Report; Live TV:	(yellow card) 52' Cervantes; 54' (o.g.) Ponce; (yellow card) 69' Aquino	Stadium: Estadio Andres Quintana Roo; Referee: (Sinaloa) Jesus Fabricio Morales

January 22, 2011 Round 3	Cruz Azul	3 – 3	UNAM	Mexico City, Mexico
17:00 CST	Villa 25'; Ponce (yellow card) 35'; Cervantes 36' (yellow card) 63'; Pineda (yellow card) 39'; Droguett 82'	Report; Live TV:	(yellow card) 36' Chiapas; (yellow card) 45' Velarde; (yellow card) 59' Augusto; (yellow card) 59' Bravo; (yellow card) 59' (goal) 60', 80' Cacho; 72' Verón	Stadium: Estadio Azul; Attendance: (Approximate unofficial) 35,161; Referee: (Jalisco) Román Rafael Medina

January 29, 2011 Round 4	Pachuca	0 – 4	Cruz Azul	Pachuca, Hidalgo, Mexico
19:00 CST	Anchico (yellow card) 21'; Arizala (yellow card) 42'; Rodríguez (yellow card) 44'; Aguilar (yellow card) 60'	Report; Live TV:	(yellow card) 30' Cervantes; 39' Droguett; (yellow card) 41' Pinto; 61' Domínguez; 74' Castro; 87' Villaluz	Stadium: Estadio Hidalgo; Referee: (Aguascalientes) Ricardo Arellano

February 5, 2011 Round 5	Cruz Azul	2 – 0	Chiapas	Mexico City, Mexico
19:00 CST	Giménez 37'; Araújo (yellow card) 40'; Villa 57'; Cervantes (yellow card) 67'; Castro (yellow card) 74'	Report; Live TV:	(yellow card) 15' Flores; (yellow card) 28' Martínez; (yellow card) 29' Esqueda; (yellow card) 53' Razo	Stadium: Estadio Azul; Attendance: (Approximate unofficial) 17,000; Referee: (Mexico City) Jaime Herrera Garduño

February 12, 2011 Round 6	UANL	2 – 0	Cruz Azul	Monterrey, Nuevo León, Mexico
19:00 CST	Mancilla 68' (yellow card) 70'; Danilinho (yellow card) 90+1'	report Live TV:	(yellow card) 37' Villaluz; (yellow card) 88' Castro	Stadium: Estadio Universitario; Referee: (Chihuahua (state)) Genaro Medrano

February 19, 2011 Round 7	Cruz Azul	2 – 1	Atlas	Mexico City, Mexico
17:00 CST	Villa 1'; Torrado (yellow card) 35'; Cervantes (yellow card) 36'; Villaluz (yellow card) 67'; Romo 90+3'	Report; Live TV:	(yellow card) 16' (yellow-red card) 90+1' Arreola; (yellow card) 16' Espinoza; (yellow card) 68' Conde; 73' (yellow card) 90+5' Santos; (yellow card) 90' Pinto; (yellow card) 90' Pacheco	Stadium: Estadio Azul; Attendance: (Approximate unofficial) 26,400; Referee: (Mexico City) Miguel Angel Flores

February 26, 2011 Round 8	Querétaro	1 – 1	Cruz Azul	Querétaro, Mexico
17:00 CST	Bueno (yellow card) 2'; Altamirano (yellow card) 4'; Acuña 6'; Ferro (red card) 13'; Velasco (red card) 50'; Cortés (yellow card) 51'; Díaz de León (yellow card) 89'	Report; Live TV:	(yellow card) 4' Pineda; (yellow card) 5' Araújo; 32' Romo; (yellow card) 66' Villa	Stadium: Estadio Corregidora; Referee: (Mexico City) Jorge Isaac Rojas

March 5, 2011 Round 9	Cruz Azul	0 – 0	Necaxa	Mexico City, Mexico
17:00 CST	Torrado (yellow card) 31'	Report; Live TV:	(yellow card) 27' Barbosa; (yellow card) 30' Chávez; (red card) 71' Silva; (yellow card) 78' Castro; (yellow card) 82' Gandín; (yellow card) 89' García	Stadium: Estadio Azul; Attendance: (Approximate unofficial) 28,500; Referee: (Jalisco) Paul Delgadillo

March 13, 2011 Round 10	America	0 – 2	Cruz Azul	Mexico City, Mexico
18:00 CST	Layún (yellow card) 15'; Reyna (yellow card) 30'; Sánchez (yellow card) 35'	Report; Live TV:	16', 19' Villa; (yellow card) 28' Giménez; (yellow card) 76' Cervantes; (yellow card) 85' Palau; (yellow card) 86' Castro	Stadium: Estadio Azteca; Referee: (Mexico City) Miguel Angel Ayala

March 19, 2011 Round 11	Cruz Azul	1 – 0	Toluca	Mexico City, Mexico
17:00 CST	Giménez (yellow card) 44'; Cervantes (yellow card) 45+1'; Ponce (yellow card) 64'; Villa 67'	Report; Live TV:	(yellow card) 32' (yellow-red card) 44' González; (red card) 45+1' Talavera	Stadium: Estadio Azul; Attendance: (Approximate unofficial) 28,900; Referee: (Mexico City) Marco Antonio Rodríguez

April 2, 2011 Round 12	Santos Laguna	3 – 0	Cruz Azul	Torreón, Coahuila, Mexico
19:00 CST	Quintero 1' (red card) 71'; Baloy (yellow card) 11'; Estrada 30'; Morales (yellow card) 64'; Rodríguez 73'	Report; Live TV:	(yellow card) 5' Aquino; (yellow card) 20' Pineda; (yellow card) 70' Cervantes; (yellow card) 71' Villa; (yellow card) 75' Giménez	Stadium: Estadio Corona; Referee: (Chihuahua (state)) Genaro Medrano

April 9, 2011 Round 13	Cruz Azul	2 – 3	Morelia	Mexico City, Mexico
17:00 DST	Giménez 10'; Ponce 62'; Torrado (yellow card) 71'	Report; Live TV:	(yellow card) 6' Noriega; 16' Márquez Lugo; (yellow card) 20' García Arias; (yellow card) 42' Pérez; 55', 90+2' (yellow card) 90+2' Hernández	Stadium: Estadio Azul; Attendance: (Approximate unofficial) 22,830; Referee: (Michoacán) Francisco Chacon Gutierrez

April 13, 2011 Round 14	Cruz Azul	3 – 0	Monterrey	Mexico City, Mexico
20:30 DST	Giménez 27', 68'; Ponce (yellow card) 34'; Palau (yellow card) 47'; Romo (yellow card) 63'; Villa 71'	Report; Live TV:	(yellow card) 63' L. E. Pérez	Stadium: Estadio Azul; Attendance: (Approximate unofficial) 18,975; Referee: (Mexico City) Jorge Eduardo Gasso

April 16, 2011 Round 15	Puebla	2 – 0	Cruz Azul	Puebla, Puebla, Mexico
19:00 DST	Borja 27' (yellow card) 27'; Jiménez 44'; Ortiz (yellow card) 60'; Rincón (yellow card) 80'; Acosta (yellow card) 82'; Salinas (yellow card) 90+2'	Report; Live TV:	(yellow card) 85' Cervantes	Stadium: Estadio Cuauhtémoc; Referee: (Mexico City) Mauricio Morales

April 23, 2011 Round 16	Cruz Azul	1 – 1	Guadalajara	Mexico City, Mexico
17:00 DST	E. Gutiérrez (yellow card) 25'; Cervantes (red card) 40'; Ponce (yellow card) 44'; Villa 81'	Report; Live TV:	(yellow card) 6' Araujo; (yellow card) 8' Medina; (yellow card) 19' Esparza; 45' Fabián; (yellow card) 77' Torres; (yellow card) 87' Álvarez	Stadium: Estadio Azul; Attendance: (Approximate unofficial) 35,161; Referee: (Mexico City) Marco Antonio Rodríguez

April 30, 2011 Round 17	San Luis	0 – 0	Cruz Azul	San Luis, San Luis Potosí, Mexico
20:45 DST	Alcántar (yellow card) 17'; Mares (yellow card) 26'; Ponce (yellow card) 52'; Arroyo (yellow card) 88'	Report; Live TV:	(yellow card) 30' Araújo; (yellow card) 52' Ponce; (yellow card) 90+2' Palau	Stadium: Estadio Alfonso Lastras; Referee: (Mexico City) Roberto García Orozco

==== General table ====
Pos	Team	Pld	W	D	L	GF	GA	GD	Pts
3	Morelia	17	9	4	4	31	24	+7	31
4	Atlante	17	8	3	6	28	17	+11	27
5	Cruz Azul	17	7	5	5	25	20	+5	26
6	América	17	8	2	7	31	28	+3	26
7	Monterrey	17	7	5	5	23	20	+3	26

Source: FeMexFut
Rules for classification: 1) points; 2) goal difference; 3) number of goals scored.

==== Group table ====
Group 3
Pos	Team	Pld	W	D	L	GF	GA	GD	Pts	Qualification
1	UNAM	17	10	5	2	27	13	+14	35	Advanced to the Final Phase
2	Morelia	17	9	4	4	31	24	+7	31	Advanced to the Final Phase
3	Cruz Azul	17	7	5	5	25	20	+5	26	Advanced to the Final Phase
4	Puebla	17	5	3	9	16	26	−10	18	
5	Querétaro	17	4	4	9	16	35	−19	16	
6	Chiapas	17	4	2	11	15	30	−15	14	

==== Final phase ====
Quarter-finals

May 4, 2011 First Leg	Cruz Azul	2 - 1	Atlante	Mexico City, Mexico
21:00 DST	Giménez 18', 46'; Ponce (yellow card) 33'; Palau (yellow card) 79'	Report; Live TV:	7' Maldonado; (yellow card) 57' (yellow-red card) 66' Muñoz	Stadium: Estadio Azul; Attendance: (Approximate unofficial) 30,213; Referee: (San Luis Potosí) Miguel Ángel Ortega

May 7, 2011 Second Leg	Atlante	0 - 0 (1 - 2 agg.)	Cruz Azul	Cancún, Quintana Roo, Mexico
21:00 DST	Maldonado (yellow card) 16'; Diego (yellow card) 35'; Venegas (yellow card) 84'; Nápoles (yellow card) 90+1'	Report; Live TV:	(yellow card) 7' Villaluz; (yellow card) 38' Palau; (yellow card) 65' Villa; (yellow card) 77' Corona	Stadium: Estadio Andrés Quintana Roo; Referee: (Mexico City) Roberto García Orozco

Cruz Azul won 1–2 in aggregate.

Semi-finals

May 12, 2011 First Leg	Cruz Azul	2 - 0	Morelia	Mexico City, Mexico
21:00 DST	Giménez 27'; Ponce (yellow card) 30'; Torrado (yellow card) 40'; Villa 45+1' (yellow card) 66'	Report; Live TV:	(yellow card) 6' Leão; (yellow card) 53' Noriega; (yellow card) 59' Huiqui; (yellow card) 70' García A.	Stadium: Estadio Azul; Attendance: (Approximate unofficial) 34,295; Referee: (Mexico City) Mauricio Morales

May 15, 2011 Second Leg	Morelia	3 - 0 (3 - 2 agg.)	Cruz Azul	Morelia, Michoacán, Mexico
20:00 DST	Márquez L. 8', 11' (yellow card) 45'; Pérez (yellow card) 41'; Aldrete (yellow card) 83'; Lozano 87'; Sabah (red card) 90+1'; Boy (coach) (red card) 90+1'; Martín (Fitness coach) (red card) 90+1'	Report; Live TV:	(red card) 4' Jiménez (team doctor); (yellow card) 27' Torrado; (yellow card) 41' Pinto; (yellow card) 46' Ponce; (red card) 90+1' Giménez; (red card) 90+1' Romo; (red card) 90+1' Meza (coach); (red card) 90+1' Ipata (Fitness coach)	Stadium: Estadio Morelos; Referee: (Michoacán) Francisco Chacon Gutierrez

== Squad statistics ==
=== Start formations ===
Qnt	Formation	Match(es)
41	4-4-2	A (16), CCL (7), C (18)
5	4-3-3	CCL (3), C (2)
4	5-3-2	A (2), C (1), CCL (1)
2	5-4-1	A (1), CCL (1)

Last updated: 16 May
Only competitive matches.

=== Starting 11 ===
No.	Pos.	Nat.	Name	MS	Notes
11 starters
1	GK	(Mexico)	Jesús Corona	45	
16	RB	(Mexico)	Rogelio Chávez	21	
4	CB	(Mexico)	Julio César Domínguez	32	
15	CB	(Mexico)	Horacio Cervantes	41	
2	LB	(Mexico)	Fausto Pinto	43	
6	CM	(Mexico)	Gerardo Torrado	37	
8	CM	(Mexico)	Gonzalo Pineda	40	
10	RM	(Argentina)	Christian Giménez	44	
18	RM	(Mexico)	César Villaluz	22	
27	FW	(Mexico)	Javier Orozco	29	
30	FW	(Argentina)	Emanuel Villa	48	
Other starters
25	GK	(Mexico)	Yosgart Gutiérrez	7	
5	RB	(Mexico)	Alejandro Castro	16	
19	CB	(Chile)	Waldo Ponce	19	
out	CB	(Mexico)	Joel Huiqui	16	out to Morelia
14	CB	(Mexico)	Nestor Araújo	18	
28	LB	(Mexico)	Gienir García	2	
21	DM	(Mexico)	Héctor Gutiérrez	9	
3	DM	(Uruguay)	Marcelo Palau	16	
22	CM	(Mexico)	Adrián Cortés	12	
19	LM	(Chile)	Hugo Droguett	9	
13	LM	(Mexico)	Allam Bello	4	
7	LM	(Mexico)	Javier Aquino	12	
11	LM	(Mexico)	Alejandro Vela	22	
9	FW	(Mexico)	Isaac Romo	2	
out	FW	(Argentina)	Maximiliano Biancucchi	9	out to Olimpia

Last updated: 16 May 2011
Source: Squad stats and Start formations.
Only competitive matches.
Using the most used start formation.
Ordered by position on pitch (from back right to front left).

- Cruz Azul Starting 11 in their 4-4–2 formation

=== Apps and Goals ===
xxxxXXXXXXXXXXXXXXXXXXXXXXXXXXXXxxxx	Apertura 2010	Champions League	Clausura 2011	Total

No.	Pos.	Player	Apps	Goals	Apps	Goals	Apps	Goals	GS	Apps	Goals	Notes
1	GK	(Mexico) Jesús Corona	18	(-16)	6	(-4)	21	(-24)	45	45	(-44)	(−) means goals conceded
12	GK	(Mexico) Guillermo Allison	0	0	0	0	0	0	0	0	0	(−) means goals conceded
25	GK	(Mexico) Yosgart Gutiérrez	1	0	6	(-11)	0	0	7	7	(-11)	(−) means goals conceded
2	DF	(Mexico) Fausto Pinto	18	0	5(1)	0	20	0	43	43	0	
4	DF	(Mexico) Julio César Domínguez	6(2)	0	9	0	16	1	31	33	1	
5	DF	(Mexico) Alejandro Castro	4(7)	1	10(1)	0	2(10)	1	16	34	2	
14	DF	(Mexico) Nestor Araújo	5	0	2	0	10(1)	0	18	19	0	
15	DF	(Mexico) Horacio Cervantes	17	4	10	0	14	1	41	41	5	
16	DF	(Mexico) Rogelio Chávez	14(2)	0	1(4)	0	6(2)	0	21	29	0	
22	DF	(Mexico) Adrián Cortés	2(5)	1	5(1)	2	5(2)	0	12	20	3	
23	DF	(Mexico) Hiram Mondragón	0	0	0(1)	0	0	0	0	1	0	
26	DF	(Chile) Waldo Ponce	_	_	3	0	16(1)	1	19	20	1	
28	DF	(Mexico) Gienir García	0(1)	0	2	1	0	0	2	3	1	
3	MF	(Uruguay) Marcelo Palau	_	_	2(1)	0	14(1)	1	16	18	1	
6	MF	(Mexico) Gerardo Torrado	17(1)	0	7(2)	0	13(2)	0	37	42	0	
7	MF	(Mexico) Javier Aquino	1(10)	1	4(4)	0	7(11)	0	12	37	1	
8	MF	(Mexico) Gonzalo Pineda	18(2)	0	6(1)	0	16(1)	1	40	44	1	
10	MF	(Argentina) Christian Giménez	18(1)	9	5(4)	4	21	8	44	49	21	
13	MF	(Mexico) Allam Bello	0(1)	0	0(2)	0	4(2)	0	4	8	0	
17	MF	(Mexico) Diego De la Cruz	0	0	0	0	0	0	0	0	0	
18	MF	(Mexico) César Villaluz	3(5)	2	9(3)	2	10(11)	1	23	41	5	
19	MF	(Chile) Hugo Droguett	_	_	1(1)	0	8(2)	2	9	12	2	Injured.
20	MF	(Mexico) Germán Rodríguez	0	0	0	0	0	0	0	0	0	
21	MF	(Mexico) Héctor Gutiérrez	2(7)	0	5	0	2(1)	0	9	17	0	
24	MF	(Mexico) Luis Alanis	0	0	0(1)	0	0	0	0	1	0	
9	FW	(Mexico) Isaac Romo	_	_	0(3)	0	2(7)	2	2	12	2	
11	FW	(Mexico) Alejandro Vela	17(2)	3	5(3)	0	_	_	22	27	3	Injured.
27	FW	(Mexico) Javier Orozco	15(3)	6	10(1)	11	3(8)	0	29	40	17	
29	FW	(Mexico) Martín Galván	_	_	0	0	0	0	0	0	0	
30	FW	(Argentina) Emanuel Villa	19	5	9	8	20(1)	10	48	49	23	
59	GK	(Mexico) Christian Barrientos	0	0	0	0	0	0	0	0	0	(−) means goals conceded
OUT	DF	(Mexico) Joel Huiqui	13	0	3	0	_	_	16	16	0	out to Morelia
OUT	FW	(Argentina) Maximiliano Biancucchi	3(8)	1	6(1)	2	_	_	9	18	4	out to Olimpia
-	-	-	_	-	-	-	-	-	-	-	-	(parenthesis indicates entry by substitution)

=== Discipline ===
xxxxXXXXXXXXXXXXXXXXXXXXXXXXXXXXxxxx	Apertura 2010	Champions League	Clausura 2011	Total Discipline

No.	Pos.	Player	Yellow card	Yellow card Red card	Red card	Yellow card	Yellow card Red card	Red card	Yellow card	Yellow card Red card	Red card	Yellow card	Yellow card Red card	Red card
1	GK	(Mexico) Jesús Corona	0	1	0	0	0	0	1	0	0	1	1	0
12	GK	(Mexico) Guillermo Allison	0	0	0	0	0	0	0	0	0	0	0	0
25	GK	(Mexico) Yosgart Gutiérrez	0	0	0	0	0	0	0	0	0	0	0	0
2	DF	(Mexico) Fausto Pinto	3	0	0	1	1	0	2	0	0	6	1	0
4	DF	(Mexico) Julio César Domínguez	0	0	0	0	0	0	1	0	0	1	0	0
5	DF	(Mexico) Alejandro Castro	3	0	0	1	0	0	3	0	0	7	0	0
14	DF	(Mexico) Nestor Araújo	0	0	0	0	0	0	3	0	0	3	0	0
15	DF	(Mexico) Horacio Cervantes	5	2	0	2	0	0	8	0	1	15	2	1
16	DF	(Mexico) Rogelio Chávez	0	0	0	0	0	0	0	0	0	0	0	0
22	DF	(Mexico) Adrián Cortés	0	0	0	1	0	0	0	0	0	1	0	0
23	DF	(Mexico) Hiram Mondragón	0	0	0	0	0	0	0	0	0	0	0	0
26	DF	(Chile) Waldo Ponce	_	_	_	0	1	0	8	0	0	8	1	0
28	DF	(Mexico) Gienir García	1	0	0	1	0	0	0	0	0	2	0	0
3	MF	(Uruguay) Marcelo Palau	_	_	_	2	0	0	5	0	0	7	0	0
6	MF	(Mexico) Gerardo Torrado	7	0	0	3	0	0	6	0	0	16	0	0
7	MF	(Mexico) Javier Aquino	1	0	0	0	0	0	2	0	0	3	0	0
8	MF	(Mexico) Gonzalo Pineda	3	0	0	2	0	0	3	0	0	8	0	0
10	MF	(Argentina) Christian Giménez	6	0	0	3	1	0	3	0	1	12	1	1
13	MF	(Mexico) Allam Bello	0	0	0	1	0	0	0	0	0	1	0	0
17	MF	(Mexico) Diego De la Cruz	0	0	0	0	0	0	0	0	0	0	0	0
18	MF	(Mexico) César Villaluz	1	0	0	2	0	0	3	0	0	6	0	0
19	MF	(Chile) Hugo Droguett	_	_	_	1	0	0	0	0	0	1	0	0
20	MF	(Mexico) Germán Rodríguez	0	0	0	0	0	0	0	0	0	0	0	0
21	MF	(Mexico) Héctor Gutiérrez	2	0	0	1	0	0	1	0	0	4	0	0
24	MF	(Mexico) Luis Alanis	0	0	0	0	0	0	0	0	0	0	0	0
9	FW	(Mexico) Isaac Romo	_	_	_	0	0	0	1	0	1	1	0	1
11	FW	(Mexico) Alejandro Vela	2	0	0	0	0	0	_	_	_	2	0	0
27	FW	(Mexico) Javier Orozco	0	0	0	1	0	0	0	0	0	1	0	0
29	FW	(Mexico) Martín Galván	0	0	0	0	0	0	0	0	0	0	0	0
30	FW	(Argentina) Emanuel Villa	3	0	0	3	0	0	4	0	0	10	0	0
59	GK	(Mexico) Christian Barrientos	0	0	0	0	0	0	0	0	0	0	0	0
OUT	DF	(Mexico) Joel Huiqui	2	0	0	1	0	0	_	_	_	3	0	0
OUT	FW	(Argentina) Maximiliano Biancucchi	0	0	0	1	0	0	_	_	_	1	0	0

Last updated: 16 May 2011
Source: Competitive matches
Only competitive matches
(yellow card) = Number of bookings; (second yellow card) = Number of sending offs after a second yellow card; (red card) = Number of sending offs by a direct red card..

=== Overall ===
	Total	Home	Away
Games played	52	26	26
Games won	29	19	10
Games drawn	11	5	6
Games lost	12	2	10
Biggest win (Apertura)	0–3 vs Estudiantes, 4–1 vs Pachuca, 3-0 vs Querétaro, 3-0 vs Santos	4–1 vs Pachuca, 3-0 vs Querétaro, 3-0 vs Santos	0–3 vs Estudiantes
Biggest win (CONCACAF)	6–0 vs San Francisco, 0–6 vs Árabe Unido	6–0 vs San Francisco	0–6 vs Árabe Unido
Biggest win (Clausura)	0-4 vs Pachuca	4-1 vs Estudiantes, 3-0 vs Monterrey	0-4 vs Pachuca
Biggest lose (Apertura)	2–0 & 0-2 vs UNAM	0–2 vs UNAM	2–0 vs UNAM
Biggest lose (CONCACAF)	1-3 vs Real Salt Lake	- - - -	1-3 vs Real Salt Lake
Biggest lose (Clausura)	3-0 vs Atlante, 3-0 vs Santos, 3-0 vs Morelia	2-3 vs Morelia	3-0 vs Atlante, 3-0 vs Santos, 3-0 vs Morelia
Goals scored	95	56	39
Goals conceded	55	20	34
Goal difference	+40	+36	+4
Average GF per game	1.83	2.15	1.5
Average GA per game	1.06	0.77	1.31
Most Game Started	48	(Argentina) Emanuel Villa	
Most appearances	49	(Argentina) Christian Giménez & Emanuel Villa	
Top scorer	23	(Argentina) Emanuel Villa	
Points	98/156 (62.82%)	62/78 (79.49%)	36/78 (46.15%)
Winning rate	29/52 (55.77%)	19/26 (73.08%)	10/26 (38.46%)

Last updated: 16 May 2011
Source: Competitive matches

== Goalscorers ==
Position	Nation	Name	Apertura 2010	Champions League	Clausura 2011	Total
1	(Argentina)	Emmanuel Villa	5	8	10	23
2	(Argentina)	Christian Giménez	9	4	8	21
3	(Mexico)	Javier Orozco	6	11		17
4	(Mexico)	Horacio Cervantes	4		1	5
4	(Mexico)	César Villaluz	2	2	1	5
6	(Argentina)	Maximiliano Biancucchi	1	3	"N/C"	4
7	(Mexico)	Alejandro Vela	3			3
7	(Mexico)	Adrián Cortés	1	2		3
9	(Mexico)	Alejandro Castro	1		1	2
9	(Mexico)	Isaac Romo	"N/C"		2	2
9	(Chile)	Hugo Droguett	"N/C"		2	2
9		Own goal	2			2
13	(Mexico)	Gienir García		1		1
13	(Mexico)	Javier Aquino	1			1
13	(Mexico)	Gonzalo Pineda			1	1
13	(Mexico)	Julio César Domínguez			1	1
13	(Uruguay)	Marcelo Palau	"N/C"		1	1
13	(Chile)	Waldo Ponce	"N/C"		1	1
TOTAL			35	31	29	95

=== Goal minutes ===
Updated to games played on 13 May 2011.

1'–15'	16'–30'	31'–HT	46'–60'	61'–75'	76'–FT	Extra time	"Total"
14	13	19	13	16	15	5	95

== Results ==
=== Apertura 2010 ===
==== Results summary ====
Overall								Home						Away					
Pld	W	D	L	GF	GA	GD	Pts	W	D	L	GF	GA	GD	W	D	L	GF	GA	GD
19	13	3	3	35	16	+19	42	8	0	1	18	5	+13	5	3	2	17	11	+6

Last updated: 20 November.
Source: Competitive Matches

==== Results by round ====
Round	1	2	3	4	5	6	7	8	9	10	11	12	13	14	15	16	17	18	19
Ground	A	H	A	H	A	H	A	H	A	H	A	H	A	A	H	A	H	A	H
Result	W	W	L	W	W	W	W	W	L	W	D	W	D	W	W	D	W	W	L
Position	2	2	5	3	2	2	1	1	1	1	1	1	1	1	1	1	1		

Updated to match(es) played on 20 November. Source: Competitive Matches
A = Away; H = Home; W = Win; D = Draw; L = Loss

=== CONCACAF Champions League ===
==== Results summary ====
Overall								Home						Away					
Pld	W	D	L	GF	GA	GD	Pts	W	D	L	GF	GA	GD	W	D	L	GF	GA	GD
12	7	2	3	31	15	+16	23	4	2	0	16	5	+11	3	0	3	15	10	+5

Last updated: 12 April.
Source: Competitive Matches

==== Results by round ====
Round	1	2	3	4	5	6	7	8	9	10	11	12
Ground	A	H	A	H	A	H	H	A	H	A	A	H
Result	W	W	L	W	W	D	W	L	W	W	L	D
Position			4	1	1	2	1	2				

Updated to match(es) played on 12 April. Source: CONCACAF Champions League
A = Away; H = Home; W = Win; D = Draw; L = Loss

=== Clausura 2011 ===
==== Results summary ====
Overall								Home						Away					
Pld	W	D	L	GF	GA	GD	Pts	W	D	L	GF	GA	GD	W	D	L	GF	GA	GD
21	9	6	6	29	24	+5	33	7	3	1	22	10	+12	2	3	5	7	14	−7

Last updated: 16 May.
Source: Competitive Matches

==== Results by round ====
Round	1	2	3	4	5	6	7	8	9	10	11	12	13	14	15	16	17	18	19	20	21
Ground	H	A	H	A	H	A	H	A	H	A	H	A	H	H	A	H	A	H	A	H	A
Result	W	L	D	W	W	L	W	D	D	W	W	L	L	W	L	D	D	W	D	W	L
Position	2	8	7	5	3	5	3	4	5	4	3	4	6	5	5	5	5				

Updated to match(es) played on 16 May. Source: Competitive Matches
A = Away; H = Home; W = Win; D = Draw; L = Loss

== IFFHS Ranking ==
Cruz Azul position on the Club World Ranking during the 2010–11 season, according to IFFHS.

Month	Position	Points
July	52	141.5
August	36	171.5
September	46	166.5
October	43	169.5
November	49	160.5
December	55	156
January	53	159
February	45	168
March	53	157.5
April	67	144
May	64	151.5
June	66	151.5

Last updated: 20 July 2011.
Source: IFFHS
