= 2001 South American U-20 Championship squads =

The team rosters for the 2001 South American U-20 Championship football tournament held in Ecuador. The ten national teams involved in the tournament were required to register a squad of 20 players; only players in these squads were eligible to take part in the tournament.

Players name marked in bold have been capped at full international level.

== Argentina ==
Coach: José Néstor Pekerman (Argentina)

No.	Pos.	Player	Date of birth (age)	Caps	Club
1	GK	**Wilfredo Daniel Caballero**	28 September 1981 (aged 19)		(Argentina) Boca Juniors
2	DF	**Nicolás Burdisso**	4 December 1981 (aged 19)		(Argentina) Boca Juniors
3	MF	Julio Arca	31 January 1981 (aged 19)		(England) Sunderland
4	DF	Pablo de Muner	14 January 1981 (aged 19)		(Argentina) Argentinos Juniors
5	MF	Luis Zubeldía	13 January 1981 (aged 19)		(Argentina) Lanús
6	DF	**Fabricio Coloccini**	22 January 1982 (aged 18)		(Italy) A.C. Milan
7	FW	Christian Giménez	1 February 1981 (aged 19)		(Argentina) Boca Juniors
8	MF	**Mariano González**	5 May 1981 (aged 19)		(Argentina) Racing Club
9	FW	Alejandro Domínguez	6 October 1981 (aged 19)		(Argentina) Quilmes
10	FW	**Mario Santana**	23 December 1981 (aged 19)		(Argentina) San Lorenzo
11	MF	Leonardo Di Lorenzo	20 May 1981 (aged 19)		(Argentina) San Lorenzo
12	GK	**Germán Lux**	6 July 1982 (aged 18)		(Argentina) River Plate
13	DF	Emiliano Giannunzio	25 January 1982 (aged 18)		(Argentina) Lanús
14	DF	José María Calvo	15 July 1981 (aged 19)		(Argentina) Boca Juniors
15	MF	Diego Rivero	8 November 1981 (aged 19)		(Argentina) Chacarita Juniors
16	MF	Matías Lequi	13 May 1981 (aged 19)		(Argentina) Rosario Central
17	MF	**Mauro Rosales**	24 February 1982 (aged 18)		(Argentina) Newell's Old Boys
18	FW	Facundo Pérez Castro	8 July 1981 (aged 19)		(Argentina) Argentinos Juniors
19	MF	Mauro Obolo	28 September 1981 (aged 19)		(Argentina) Vélez Sársfield
20	DF	Mauro Cetto	14 April 1982 (aged 18)		(Argentina) Rosario Central

(Source for player names:)

== Bolivia ==
Coach: Adolfo Flores (Bolivia)

No.	Pos.	Player	Date of birth (age)	Caps	Club
1	GK	**Hugo Suárez**	2 July 1982 (aged 18)		(Bolivia) Real Santa Cruz
2	DF	**Limbert Méndez**	18 August 1982 (aged 18)		(Bolivia) Jorge Wilstermann
3	MF	José Luis Algarañaz	3 November 1982 (aged 18)		(Bolivia) Bolivar
4	DF	Jorge Flavio Zapata	1 June 1981 (aged 19)		(Bolivia) Real Santa Cruz
5	DF	**Roland Raldes**	20 April 1981 (aged 19)		(Bolivia) Oriente Petrolero
6	MF	Rubén Melgar	4 August 1981 (aged 19)		(Bolivia) Guabirá
7	FW	**Joselito Vaca**	2 September 1981 (aged 19)		(Bolivia) Oriente Petrolero
8	MF	Rolando Torres	22 March 1981 (aged 19)		(Bolivia) Independiente Petrolero
9	FW	**José Alfredo Castillo**	2 September 1983 (aged 17)		(Bolivia) Oriente Petrolero
10	MF	Hélder Chávez	23 August 1983 (aged 17)		(Bolivia) The Strongest
11	MF	**Sacha Lima**	23 August 1981 (aged 19)		(Bolivia) Jorge Wilstermann
12	GK	Ditter Alquiza	26 October 1982 (aged 18)		(Bolivia) Guabirá
13	MF	Armando Aguilar	1 July 1981 (aged 19)		(Bolivia) Sport Boys
14	FW	Julio César Cortez	2 October 1981 (aged 19)		(Bolivia) Blooming
15	DF	**Herman Soliz**	14 July 1982 (aged 18)		(Bolivia) Mariscal Braun
16	DF	Roberto Menacho	2 April 1982 (aged 18)		(Bolivia) Blooming
17	MF	**Diego Cabrera**	13 August 1981 (aged 19)		(Bolivia) Blooming
18	MF	Víctor Hugo Díaz	10 January 1981 (aged 19)		(Bolivia) Independiente Petrolero
19	MF	Tony Rodríguez	4 November 1981 (aged 19)		(Bolivia) Blooming
20	MF	Francisco Divico	9 August 1982 (aged 18)		(Bolivia) Atlético González

(Source for player names:)

== Brazil ==
Coach: Carlos César (Brazil)

No.	Pos.	Player	Date of birth (age)	Caps	Club
1	GK	Rubinho	8 April 1982 (aged 18)		(Brazil) Corinthians
2	DF	**Maicon**	25 July 1981 (aged 19)		(Brazil) Cruzeiro
3	DF	Edu Dracena	18 May 1981 (aged 19)		(Brazil) Guarani
4	DF	Marquinhos	21 October 1982 (aged 18)		(Brazil) Corinthians
5	MF	**Eduardo Costa**	23 September 1982 (aged 18)		(Brazil) Grêmio
6	DF	Leilton	7 March 1982 (aged 18)		(Brazil) Vitória
7	FW	**Ewerthon**	10 June 1981 (aged 19)		(Brazil) Corinthians
8	MF	**Fabio Rochemback**	10 December 1981 (aged 19)		(Brazil) Internacional
9	FW	**Adriano**	17 February 1982 (aged 18)		(Brazil) Flamengo
10	MF	**Júlio Baptista**	1 October 1981 (aged 19)		(Brazil) São Paulo
11	MF	Marcinho	20 March 1981 (aged 19)		(Brazil) Etti Jundiaí
12	GK	Márcio	20 December 1981 (aged 19)		(Brazil) São Paulo
13	DF	Valnei	1 September 1981 (aged 19)		(Brazil) Santa Cruz
14	MF	**Fernando**	3 May 1981 (aged 19)		(Brazil) Juventude
15	DF	Anderson	10 January 1983 (aged 17)		(Brazil) Flamengo
16	MF	Andrezinho	30 July 1983 (aged 17)		(Brazil) Flamengo
17	DF	Gláuber	9 February 1981 (aged 19)		(Brazil) Guarani
18	MF	**Léo Lima**	14 January 1982 (aged 18)		(Brazil) Vasco
19	FW	Jackson	9 January 1981 (aged 19)		(Brazil) Flamengo
20	FW	André Dias	11 March 1981 (aged 19)		(Brazil) Santos

== Chile ==
Coach: Héctor Pinto (Chile)

No.	Pos.	Player	Date of birth (age)	Caps	Goals	Club
1	GK	**Johnny Herrera**	May 9, 1981 (aged 19)			(Football Federation of Chile) Universidad de Chile
2	DF	Gino Reyes	February 23, 1981 (aged 19)			(Football Federation of Chile) Colo-Colo
3	DF	Mario Berríos	August 20, 1981 (aged 19)			(Football Federation of Chile) Palestino
4	MF	**Hugo Droguett**	September 2, 1982 (aged 18)			(Football Federation of Chile) Universidad Catolica
5	MF	Adán Vergara	May 9, 1981 (aged 19)			(Football Federation of Chile) Cobreloa
6	MF	César Henríquez	November 1, 1981 (aged 19)			(Football Federation of Chile) Universidad de Chile
7	MF	Gonzalo Villagra	September 17, 1981 (aged 19)			(Football Federation of Chile) Universidad Catolica
8	DF	Nelson Pinto	February 1, 1981 (aged 19)			(Football Federation of Chile) Universidad de Chile
9	FW	Luis Flores Abarca	May 3, 1982 (aged 18)			(Football Federation of Chile) Palestino
10	MF	Sebastián Pardo	January 2, 1981 (aged 20)			(Football Federation of Chile) Universidad de Chile
11	FW	José Luis Villanueva	November 5, 1981 (aged 19)			(Football Federation of Chile) Palestino
12	GK	Eduardo Lobos	July 30, 1981 (aged 19)			(Football Federation of Chile) Colo-Colo
13	DF	Joel Soto	April 9, 1982 (aged 18)			(Football Federation of Chile) Santiago Wanderers
14	MF	Jaime Jorquera	March 13, 1981 (aged 19)			(Football Federation of Chile) Cobreloa
15	MF	Rubén Bascuñán	February 23, 1982 (aged 18)			(Football Federation of Chile) Colo-Colo
16	MF	Juan José Albornoz	February 12, 1981 (aged 19)			(Football Federation of Chile) Rangers de Talca
17	DF	Daniel Campos	July 17, 1981 (aged 19)			(Football Federation of Chile) Deportes Concepción
18	MF	**Rodrigo Millar**	November 3, 1981 (aged 19)			(Football Federation of Chile) C.D. Huachipato
19	MF	**Jaime Valdés**	January 11, 1981 (aged 19)			(Italian Football Federation) A.S. Bari
20	FW	Mario Salgado	June 3, 1981 (aged 19)			(Football Federation of Chile) C.D. Huachipato

(Source for player names:)

== Colombia ==
Coach: Alfredo Araujo (Colombia)

No.	Pos.	Player	Date of birth (age)	Caps	Club
1	GK	Edgar Uribe	17 December 1981 (aged 19)		(Colombia) Atlético Nacional
2	DF	Wilman Conde	29 August 1982 (aged 18)		(Colombia) Deportivo Quindío
3	MF	Jorge Amará	7 July 1982 (aged 18)		(Colombia) Atlético Junior
4	DF	Diego Valdez	13 August 1981 (aged 19)		(Colombia) Deportivo Cali
5	MF	Diego Toro	29 January 1982 (aged 18)		(Colombia) Atlético Nacional
6	MF	Jhon Culma	17 March 1981 (aged 19)		(Argentina) Independiente
7	FW	Oscar Villarreal	27 March 1981 (aged 19)		(Colombia) Real Cartagena
8	MF	**Aldo Ramírez**	14 August 1981 (aged 19)		(Colombia) Independiente Santa Fe
9	FW	John Elder Castillo	21 September 1983 (aged 17)		(Colombia) Atletico Huila
10	MF	**Jhonnier Montaño**	14 January 1983 (aged 17)		(Italy) AC Parma
11	MF	Carlos Álvarez	2 December 1981 (aged 19)		(Colombia) Independiente Medellín
12	GK	Álvaro Solís	26 August 1981 (aged 19)		(Colombia) Deportivo Cali
13	FW	Leonardo Rojano	1 February 1981 (aged 19)		(Colombia) Atlético Junior
14	FW	Jimmy Castillo	25 September 1981 (aged 19)		(Argentina) Independiente
15	DF	Juan David Bautista	8 November 1983 (aged 17)		(Colombia) Independiente Medellín
16	DF	**Rubén Darío Bustos**	28 August 1981 (aged 19)		(Colombia) América de Cali
17	MF	Javier Florez	18 May 1982 (aged 18)		(Colombia) Atlético Junior
18	MF	**Álvaro Domínguez**	6 October 1981 (aged 19)		(Colombia) Deportivo Cali
19	DF	Jamell Ramos	10 December 1981 (aged 19)		(Colombia) Envigado
20	MF	Luis Chara	1 June 1981 (aged 19)		(Colombia) Atlético Nacional

(Source for player names:)

== Ecuador ==
Coaches: Jose Maria Andrade (Ecuador) and Fabian Burbano (Ecuador)

No.	Pos.	Player	Date of birth (age)	Caps	Goals	Club

- (N°1)Omar Estrada Soto GK 29/03/1982 Liga Deportiva Universitaria Quito (Ecuador)
- (N°2)Jose Luis Perlaza Napa DF 09/06/1981 Centro Deportivo Olmedo (Ecuador)
- (N°3)Jorge Daniel Guagua DF 28/09/1981 El Nacional (Ecuador)
- (N°4)Pool Geovanny Gavilanez Solis DF 08/03/1981 Club Sport Emelec (Ecuador)
- (N°5)Camilo David Hurtado Hurtado MF 14/03/1981 Liga Deportiva Universitaria Quito (Ecuador)
- (N°6)Jorge Alberto Vargas Oyola DF 30/01/1981 Liga Deportiva Universitaria Quito (Ecuador)
- (N°7)Abdala Jaime Bucaram Pulley MF 25/03/1982 Club Sport Emelec (Ecuador)
- (N°8)Lider Leonardo Mejia MF 26/01/1981 Liga Deportiva Universitaria Quito (Ecuador)
- (N°9)Estuardo Cristian Quiñonez Montaño FW 14/04/1981 Universidad Catolica (Ecuador)
- (N°10)Gerardo Javier Sacon Intriago MF 01/09/1981 Club Sport Emelec (Ecuador)
- (N°11)Franklin Agustin Salas Narvaez FW 30/08/1981 Liga Deportiva Universitaria Quito (Ecuador)
- (N°12)Rorys Andres Aragon Espinoza GK 28/06/1982 Club Sport Emelec (Ecuador)
- (N°13)Javier Fabricio Delgado DF 01/10/1982 Tecnico Universitario (Ecuador)
- (N°14)Carlos Alberto Sotomayor MF 12/01/1981 Deportivo Quito (Ecuador)
- (N°15)Pablo Roberto Jarrin FW 05/09/1981 El Nacional (Ecuador)
- (N°16)Jorge Zambrano FW 02/07/1983 Audax Octubrino (Ecuador)
- (N°17)William Angelis Cuero Quiñonez DF 01/06/1981 Barcelona SC (Ecuador)
- (N°18)Juan Carlos Godoy Cuero MF 28/12/1981 Universidad Catolica (Ecuador)
- (N°19)Roberto Javier Mina Delgado FW 07/11/1984 Club Deportivo Star Club (Ecuador)
- (N°20)Walter Ramiro Iza Garcia FW 08/02/1981 Sociedad Deportiva Aucas (Ecuador)

== Paraguay ==
Coach: Cristobal Maldonado (Paraguay)

No.	Pos.	Player	Date of birth (age)	Caps	Club

- (N°1)Diego Daniel Barreto GK 16/07/1981 Club Cerro Porteño (Paraguay)
- (N°2)David Raul Villalba DF 13/04/1982 Club Olimpia (Paraguay)
- (N°3)Emilio Damian Martinez DF 10/04/1981 Club Cerro Porteño (Paraguay)
- (N°4)Felipe Ariel Gimenez Miranda DF 26/05/1981 Club Olimpia (Paraguay)
- (N°5)Pedro Juan Benitez Dominguez DF 23/03/1981 Sportivo Luqueño (Paraguay)
- (N°6)Santiago Gabriel Saucedo Gonzalez FW 06/09/1981 Club Cerro Porteño (Paraguay)
- (N°7)Alejandro Damian Da Silva Mercado FW 18/05/1983 Udinese Calcio S.p.A. (Italy)
- (N°8)Jorge Orlando Britez Larramendi MF 08/02/1981 Sporting Clube de Braga (Portugal)
- (N°9)Julio Valentin Gonzalez FW 26/08/1981 Club Guarani (Paraguay)
- (N°10)Tomás Andrés Guzmán Gaetan FW 07/03/1982 Juventus Turin (Italy)
- (N°11)Diego Antonio Figueredo Matiauda MF 28/04/1982 Club Olimpia (Paraguay)
- (N°12)Eduardo Caceres GK 12/08/1981 Sportivo Luqueño (Paraguay)
- (N°13)Victor Cabrera MF 28/06/1982 Club Guarani (Paraguay)
- (N°14)Gabriel Benigno Estigarribia DF 20/12/1981 Atletico Colegiales (Paraguay)
- (N°15)Pedro Anibal Sosa Talavera MF 06/04/1981 Sol de America (Paraguay)
- (N°16)Walter Ariel Fretes Bogarin MF 18/05/1982 Club Cerro Porteño (Paraguay)
- (N°17)Victor Salinas MF 15/02/1982 Club 12 de Octubre de Itagua (Paraguay)
- (N°18)Daniel Ferreira Caballero FW 25/09/1982 Club Olimpia (Paraguay)
- (N°19)Cristian Fatecha FW 15/03/1982 Sportivo Luqueño (Paraguay)
- (N°20)Diego Anibal Santa Cruz Cantero MF 29/10/1982 Cerro Cora (Paraguay)

== Peru ==
Coach: Julio César Uribe (Peru)

No.	Pos.	Player	Date of birth (age)	Caps	Club
1	GK	George Forsyth	20 June 1982 (aged 18)		(Peru) Alianza Lima
2	DF	Raúl Vera	25 January 1981 (aged 19)		(Peru) Cochahuayco
3	DF	Pedro Plaza	21 March 1981 (aged 19)		(Peru) Cochahuayco
4	FW	Pedro Aparicio	6 November 1982 (aged 18)		(Peru) Alianza Lima
5	DF	**Luis Hernández**	15 February 1982 (aged 18)		(Peru) Alianza Lima
6	MF	Diego Martínez	24 April 1981 (aged 19)		(Peru) Sporting Cristal
7	FW	César Balbín	18 May 1983 (aged 17)		(Peru) Sporting Cristal
8	MF	Ryan Salazar	25 February 1981 (aged 19)		(Peru) Alianza Lima
9	MF	Jorge Leyva	25 January 1981 (aged 19)		(Peru) Cochahuayco
10	MF	**Édson Uribe**	25 September 1982 (aged 18)		(Mexico) Jaguares
11	MF	**Miguel Torres**	17 January 1982 (aged 18)		(Peru) Universitario
12	GK	**Erick Delgado**	30 June 1982 (aged 18)		(Peru) Sporting Cristal
13	DF	**Walter Vílchez**	20 February 1982 (aged 18)		(Peru) Alianza Lima
14	MF	Jorge Chávez	10 May 1982 (aged 18)		(Peru) Sporting Cristal
15	DF	Alan Rodríguez	30 March 1981 (aged 19)		(Peru) Cochahuayco
16	DF	Cristián García	2 March 1981 (aged 19)		(Peru) Cienciano
17	FW	Manuel Barreto	18 September 1982 (aged 18)		(Peru) Cochahuayco
18	FW	Renzo Benavides	7 December 1981 (aged 19)		(Peru) Alianza Lima
19	FW	Jesús Reyes	21 March 1982 (aged 18)		(Peru) Juan Aurich
20	DF	Johan Sotil	29 August 1982 (aged 18)		(Peru) Universitario

(Source for player names:)

== Uruguay ==
Coach: Víctor Púa (Uruguay)

No.	Pos.	Player	Date of birth (age)	Caps	Goals	Club
1	GK	Jimmy Schmidt	December 15, 1981 (aged 19)			(Uruguayan Football Association) Nacional
2	DF	Pablo Melo	April 7, 1981 (aged 19)			(Uruguayan Football Association) Cerro
3	DF	Álvaro Meneses	May 26, 1982 (aged 18)			(Uruguayan Football Association) Nacional
4	DF	Washington Alonso	September 24, 1982 (aged 18)			(Uruguayan Football Association) Cerro
5	MF	**Sebastián Eguren**	January 8, 1981 (aged 19)			(Uruguayan Football Association) Wanderers
6	DF	Pablo Lima	March 26, 1981 (aged 19)			(Uruguayan Football Association) Danubio F.C.
7	MF	**Edgardo Sebastián Álvarez**	January 29, 1982 (aged 18)			(Uruguayan Football Association) Peñarol
8	MF	Mario Leguizamón	July 7, 1982 (aged 18)			(Uruguayan Football Association) Peñarol
9	FW	Nathaniel Revetria	June 29, 1981 (aged 19)			(Uruguayan Football Association) Defensor
10	MF	Rubén Olivera	May 4, 1983 (aged 17)			(Uruguayan Football Association) Danubio F.C.
11	FW	Darwin Barreto	May 9, 1981 (aged 19)			(Uruguayan Football Association) Juventud
12	GK	**Martín Silva**	March 25, 1983 (aged 17)			(Uruguayan Football Association) Defensor
13	DF	Williams Martínez	December 18, 1982 (aged 18)			(Uruguayan Football Association) Defensor
14	FW	Gonzalo Gutiérrez	February 20, 1981 (aged 19)			(Uruguayan Football Association) Danubio F.C.
15	DF	Carlos Diogo	July 18, 1983 (aged 17)			(Uruguayan Football Association) River Plate
16	DF	Raúl Denis	July 12, 1982 (aged 18)			(Uruguayan Football Association) Huracán Buceo
17	MF	Carlos Jacques	February 11, 1982 (aged 18)			(Uruguayan Football Association) Peñarol
18	DF	German Dominguez	January 4, 1981 (aged 20)			(Uruguayan Football Association) Nacional
19	FW	Horacio Peralta	June 3, 1982 (aged 18)			(Uruguayan Football Association) Cerro
20	DF	**Rodrigo Gómez**	March 24, 1981 (aged 19)			(Uruguayan Football Association) Defensor

(Source for player names:)

== Venezuela ==
Coach: Richard Páez (Venezuela)

No.	Pos.	Player	Date of birth (age)	Caps	Goals	Club
1	GK	Luigi Alfredo Palomino	April 6, 1981 (aged 19)			(Venezuelan Football Federation) UCV Aragua
2	DF	Johan Yacua	June 22, 1982 (aged 18)			(Venezuelan Football Federation) Deportivo Táchira
3	MF	**Giácomo Di Giorgi**	February 24, 1981 (aged 19)			(Venezuelan Football Federation) Lara FC
4	DF	Arnaldo Croquer	February 25, 1982 (aged 18)			(Venezuelan Football Federation) Zulianos
5	MF	**Miguel Mea Vitali**	February 19, 1981 (aged 19)			(Royal Spanish Football Federation) Lleida
6	DF	Enrique Andrés Rouga	February 3, 1982 (aged 18)			(Venezuelan Football Federation) Caracas FC
7	MF	**Giancarlo Maldonado**	June 29, 1982 (aged 18)			(Uruguayan Football Association) River Plate
8	MF	Anyelo Rodríguez	January 22, 1982 (aged 18)			(Venezuelan Football Federation) El Vigía
9	FW	José Morr	December 11, 1981 (aged 19)			(Venezuelan Football Federation) Portuguesa
10	MF	Wiswell Isea	September 13, 1982 (aged 18)			(Venezuelan Football Federation) Caracas FC
11	MF	Leonel Martínez	May 29, 1982 (aged 18)			(Venezuelan Football Federation) Mineros
12	GK	Gustavo Cortina	July 22, 1983 (aged 17)			(Venezuelan Football Federation) Trujillanos F.C.
13	MF	Arnaldo Aranda	February 27, 1982 (aged 18)			(Venezuelan Football Federation) Mineros
14	DF	Frank Presilla	July 28, 1982 (aged 18)			(Venezuelan Football Federation) Táchira
15	DF	Yerci Murillo	July 4, 1982 (aged 18)			(Venezuelan Football Federation) Zulianos
16	FW	Wladimir Romero	December 2, 1981 (aged 19)			(Venezuelan Football Federation) UCV Aragua
17	MF	**César González**	October 1, 1982 (aged 18)			(Venezuelan Football Federation) Monagas
18	FW	Edwin Quintero	July 27, 1982 (aged 18)			(Venezuelan Football Federation) Italchacao
19	FW	Edward Leonet	February 1, 1983 (aged 17)			(Venezuelan Football Federation) Monagas
20	MF	**Daniel Arismendi**	July 4, 1982 (aged 18)			(Venezuelan Football Federation) Mineros

(Source for player names:)
