= Raúl Vera =

Raúl Vera may refer to:

- José Raúl Vera López (born 1945), Mexican bishop of the Diocese of Saltillo
- Raúl Vera Bogado, governor of the Central Bank of Paraguay (2001–2002)
- Raúl Vera Ocampo (born 1935), Argentine poet and art critic, contributor to La Opinión (Argentina)
- Raúl Vera (footballer), Peruvian footballer, member of 2001 South American U-20 Championship squads
- Raul Vera (actor), Australian actor, participated in Fire (TV series)
