= Pedro Aparicio =

Pedro Aparicio may refer to:

- Pedro Aparicio (politician) (1942–2014), Spanish politician and doctor
- Pedro Aparicio (footballer) (born 1982), Peruvian football centre-back
- Pedro Aparício (born 2000), Portuguese football midfielder
