= Jesús Corona =

Jesús Corona may refer to:

- José de Jesús Corona (born 1981), Mexican goalkeeper
- Jesús Manuel Corona (born 1993), Mexican winger
