= Christian Giménez (footballer, born 1981) =

Mexican footballer and manager (born 1981)

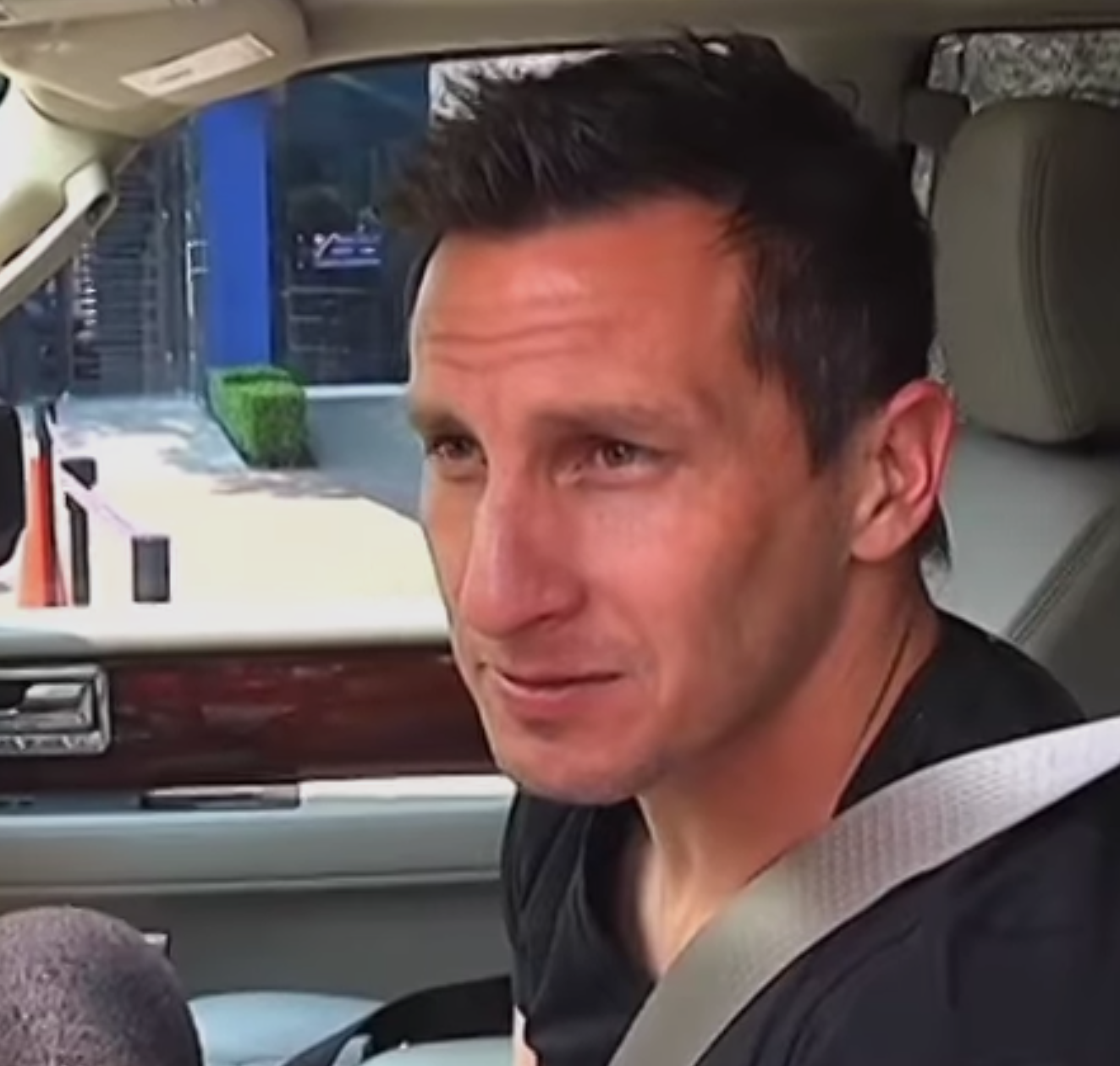
- Giménez in 2012

Personal information
- Full name: Christian Eduardo Giménez Zolotarchuk
- Date of birth: 1 February 1981 (age 45)
- Place of birth: Resistencia, Chaco, Argentina
- Height: 1.72 m (5 ft 8 in)
- Position: Attacking midfielder

Youth career
- 1989–1998: Boca Juniors

Senior career*
| Years | Team | Apps | (Gls) |
| 1998–2002 | Boca Juniors | 47 | (7) |
| 2003 | Unión | 16 | (3) |
| 2003–2004 | Independiente | 33 | (7) |
| 2004–2005 | Veracruz | 34 | (4) |
| 2005–2006 | América | 34 | (5) |
| 2006–2009 | Pachuca | 120 | (44) |
| 2010–2018 | Cruz Azul | 257 | (63) |
| 2018 | → Pachuca (loan) | 10 | (0) |
| Total | | 551 | (133) |

International career
| 2001 | Argentina U20 | 6 | (2) |
| 2013 | Mexico | 5 | (0) |

Managerial career
- 2020–2021: Cancún
- 2021: Atenas
- 2022–2023: Mazatlán (Assistant)
Medal record
Men's football
Representing Argentina
South American U-20 Championship
| Runner-up | 2001 Ecuador | Team |
- * Club domestic league appearances and goals

Christian Eduardo Giménez Zolotarchuk (born 1 February 1981), also known by his nickname Chaco, is a former professional footballer, commentator, and manager. Born in Argentina, he represented the Mexico national team.

== Club career ==
=== Argentina ===
From a very early age, Giménez was playing football in a competitive environment. In 1989, he was signed by scouts working for Boca Juniors and was immediately enrolled in the team's youth squad. Almost a decade later, Giménez debuted in the professional Argentine league with Boca Juniors and quickly enjoyed success, being part of the teams that won the Apertura '98, Clausura '99 and Apertura 2002 championships for the Xeneizes, as well as two international titles, the Copa Libertadores of 2000 and 2001.

In 2003, Giménez split time at Independiente and Unión and later returned to Independiente for the first half of the 2004 season. Then Giménez migrated to Mexico, as he was transferred to Veracruz.

=== Mexico ===
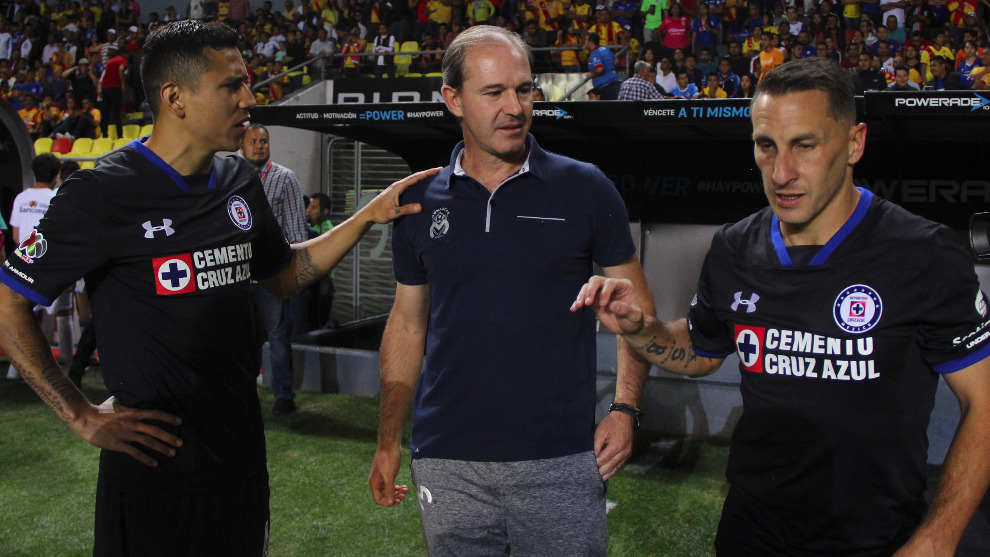
Giménez (right) with Cruz Azul

At Veracruz, Giménez was joined by a talented squad that included Walter Jiménez, Cuauhtémoc Blanco, Kléber Boas, Braulio Luna and Gustavo Biscayzacú. In Giménez's first season at Veracruz, the team led the entire league in points, with Giménez scoring four goals throughout the regular season. Despite being the top-seeded team, Veracruz exited the playoffs in the first round. The following season, Veracruz lost Blanco and Boas in the transfer window, and new signing Leandro Romagnoli was not performing at top level despite his seven figure salary. As a result, the team's performance dropped and Veracruz missed the playoffs. Giménez also saw a drop in production at a personal level, failing to score a goal despite increased play.

Before the Apertura 2005 season, it was reported that Giménez's old teammate, Cuauhtémoc Blanco, was trying to convince América to sign Giménez for the following season. The executives took Blanco's advice and Giménez was signed to a contract shortly after. In his first season at América, Giménez scored three goals despite limited play (coming off the bench in eight of his nine appearances) and América led the league in points at the end of the regular season. Strangely enough, the set of events that occurred during Blanco and Giménez's (and Kléber Boas, who also migrated to América with Blanco in 2004) partnership in Veracruz repeated themselves at América. Like at Veracruz, their team was the top-seeded club going into the playoffs, and like at Veracruz, América failed to get past the first round of the playoffs, being defeated by Tigres UANL.

Prior to the start of the Apertura 2006 season, Giménez was transferred to Pachuca, who days before had won the Clausura 2006 tournament, defeating Club San Luis – a sister club of Christian's last employer, Club América. 2007 started promisingly to Giménez, scoring eight goals in three matches.

Giménez is a member of the "Blanco Four", a group of players who once played at Veracruz with Blanco and were signed by América after being recommended by the striker. The other members are Kléber Boas, Carlos Infante and Armando Navarrete.

He left Pachuca on 17 December 2009, and signed for Cruz Azul. In the tournament Bicentario 2010 Gimenez was a quick starter for the team Cruz Azul, because of the coach Enrique Meza already knowing the great skills that Gimenez had from the years that Meza coached with Pachuca. Although Gimenez was one of the most important transfers of the season, he was not able to lead Cruz Azul to qualify for the quarter finals, and was only able to score two goals in 16 appearances. In the Apertura 2010 season, Giménez was criticized by the media because of his bad performance in the first season, and was wanted to be kicked out of Cruz Azul. But on the fifth matchday of the season Giménez scored his first hat-trick with Cruz Azul in a 3–2 win over Chiapas. On May 15, 2011, as Morelia scored the 3rd goal in the second leg of the semi-final against Cruz Azul to make it 3–2 on aggregate in Morelia's favor, a fan invades the pitch to greet Gerardo Torrado, but immediately, a frustrated Gimenez kicks the fan to the ground, the fan responds from the aggression of Gimenez before being held by Jesus Corona. Gimenez goes over the held fan to try to hit him again before being held back by both of the teams' players. Gimenez tries to get involved again when the Morelia physio slaps his teammate, Waldo Ponce which caused the brawl to escalate even further but is held back. Gimenez was sent off few minutes later alongside Isaac Romo, Miguel Sabah and both of the managers, Tomas Boy & Enrique Meza. Couple days later after the match, Gimenez would later be punished with a suspension of 6 games by the FMF and he would return next season against Pumas on August 28, 2011.

In 2018, Giménez returned to Pachuca on loan from Cruz Azul.

== International career ==
=== Argentina ===
Giménez represented Argentina at the 2001 South American Youth Championship. Argentina finished the competition in second place but he was able to score two goals.

In 2009, Diego Maradona called up Giménez for Argentina's World Cup qualifiers in June against Colombia and Ecuador, but he did not play in any of the two matches.

=== Mexico ===
In July 2013, Giménez became a naturalized Mexican citizen. On 14 August 2013, coach Jose Manuel de la Torre called up Giménez for the Mexico national team for a friendly against Ivory Coast, which Mexico won 4–1. Giménez played in four games for Mexico as part of the 2014 FIFA World Cup qualifying campaign, three games, those against Costa Rica, Honduras and the United States resulted in losses. The other was a 2–1 victory over Panama on 11 October 2013.

On 30 October, the national football association of Panama requested that FIFA re-evaluate whether Giménez was eligible for Mexico.

Giménez maintained that he was eligible for Mexico and that his appearances were non-binding for Argentina as they had already qualified for the 2001 FIFA World Youth Championship as the host nation when he was playing for Argentina in CONMEBOL's 2001 South American Youth Championship. Giménez said that Argentina were considered to be a guest in the 2001 South American Youth Championship.

== Managerial career ==
On 30 June 2020, Giménez was named as the first manager of Liga de Expansión MX club Cancún FC.

In September 2021, he joined Uruguayan club Atenas de San Carlos.

In March 2022, Giménez joined former Pachuca teammate, now manager Gabriel Caballero, as an assistant manager for Mazatlán. Caballero's coaching team was let go in January 2023.

== Style of play ==
Labeled an attacking midfielder, Giménez is one of many talented players to be exported from Boca Juniors. He was known for his strong shot and "vision to exploit the whole pitch with his range of passing."

== Personal life ==
Christian is the father of AC Milan player Santiago Giménez. His father and paternal grandparents are from Paraguay.

He is known by his nickname Chaco because he hails from the province of the same name.

In October 2017, Giménez helped found Asociación Mexicana de Futbolistas (Mexican Footballers Association).

== Honours ==
Boca Juniors

- Argentine Primera División: Apertura 1998, Clausura 1999, Apertura 2000
- Copa Libertadores: 2000, 2001
- Intercontinental Cup: 2000

América

- Campeón de Campeones: 2005
- CONCACAF Champions' Cup: 2006

Pachuca

- Mexican Primera División: Clausura 2007
- CONCACAF Champions' Cup: 2007, 2008
- SuperLiga: 2007
- Copa Sudamericana: 2006

Cruz Azul

- Copa MX: Clausura 2013
- CONCACAF Champions League: 2013–14

Individual

- Mexican Primera División Golden Ball: Clausura 2009
- Mexican Primera División Clausura Best Attacking Midfielder: Clausura 2009, Apertura 2010
