= Yosgart Gutiérrez =

Mexican footballer (born 1981)

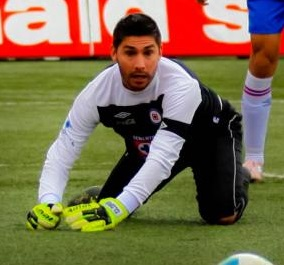
- Gutiérrez playing for Cruz Azul in 2014

Personal information
- Full name: Yosgart Ernesto Gutiérrez Serna
- Date of birth: 15 March 1981 (age 45)
- Place of birth: Guasave, Sinaloa, Mexico
- Height: 1.87 m (6 ft 2 in)
- Position: Goalkeeper

Youth career
- 1997–2003: Cruz Azul

Senior career*
Years	Team	Apps	(Gls)
2003–2016	Cruz Azul	67	(0)
2013–2014	→ Atlante (loan)	19	(0)
2015	→ UNAM (loan)	0	(0)
2016–2020	Necaxa	24	(0)
2023	Industriales Naucalpan		
Total		110	(0)

Managerial career
- 2020–2022: Necaxa Reserves and Academy
- * Club domestic league appearances and goals

Yosgart Ernesto Gutiérrez Serna (born 15 March 1981) is a Mexican former professional footballer and podcast host. He played as a goalkeeper for most of his career at Liga MX club Cruz Azul.

== Career ==
=== Cruz Azul ===
In the Clausura 2008 tournament, Cruz Azul goalkeeper Óscar Pérez had fallen out of favor with the team, which costed him the starting position. Gutiérrez began to assume the role of the first choice goalkeeper for Cruz Azul from then on.

In Gutiérrez's first season as first-choice, Cruz Azul made it to the finals, losing to Santos Laguna. Although Gutiérrez debuted for the first team in 2008, he was almost 30 years old at that time. He had signed with the club in 2003 but was subbing Pérez for five years. Once Perez formally left the team, Gutiérrez was the alternative for starting goalkeeper José de Jesús Corona.

During the Clausura 2011 tournament, Corona was involved engaged in a fight when he headbutted Monarcas Morelia phsyio as a result of retaliation due to the physio slapping his teammate, Waldo Ponce, during the second leg of the tournament's semifinal. Gutiérrez was one of the two who kicked the Morelia physio alongside his teammate, Fausto Pinto, but he was not suspended. As a result, Corona did not play the first six games in the 2011 Apertura season and Gutiérrez took over the starting spot.

=== Atlante ===
In June 2013, Gutiérrez joined Atlante on a one-year loan deal from Cruz Azul ahead of the Apertura 2013 tournament. He made his competitive debut for the club on 20 July 2013, starting in a 1–0 away defeat against León. On 7 September 2013, he earned widespread media praise after saving two penalties during a 2–2 home draw against Monarcas Morelia. Gutiérrez served as the primary starting goalkeeper throughout his tenure, making 29 league appearances across both the Apertura and Clausura campaigns. Despite his individual efforts, Atlante finished at the bottom of the percentage table and suffered relegation to the second division at the end of the 2013–14 season, marking the end of his loan spell before his return to Cruz Azul.

=== Pumas UNAM ===
In December 2014, Gutiérrez joined Pumas UNAM on a year-long loan from Cruz Azul to provide veteran coverage following a severe shoulder injury to starting goalkeeper Alejandro Palacios. Signed by manager Guillermo Vázquez—who had previously coached him at Cruz Azul—Gutiérrez served primarily as the second-choice goalkeeper behind Alfredo Saldívar. He made his official debut for the club on 4 February 2015, keeping a clean sheet in a 1–0 Copa MX group stage victory over Chiapas. He featured in five Copa MX matches during the Clausura 2015 tournament but did not make any appearances in Liga MX play during his twelve months with the university side.

=== Necaxa ===
On 16 December 2015, Gutiérrez signed with Necaxa on a season-long loan deal ahead of the Clausura 2016 tournament in the Ascenso MX. He established himself as the team's starting goalkeeper, helping the club secure the Ascenso MX title and subsequent promotion back to the top-flight Liga MX. Following the promotion, his transfer was made permanent, and he transitioned primarily into a backup goalkeeper role and the preferred choice for domestic cup tournaments. He started both legs of the Copa MX Clausura 2018 final, keeping a clean sheet in a 1–0 victory over Toluca to secure the trophy on 11 April 2018. Gutiérrez remained with the Aguascalientes-based club until announcing his retirement from professional football in June 2020. Following his retirement, he transitioned into a coaching role within Necaxa's youth academy.

Gutiérrez announced his retirement in May 2020.

== Podcast ==
Gutiérrez hosts the podcast El RePortero, in which he interviews prominent figures in Mexican football. His conversational interview style has drawn attention for surfacing previously undocumented stories and anecdotes from players, coaches, and other figures within the sport. As of 2026, the podcast ranks among the most widely followed in Mexican sports media.

== Honours ==
Necaxa

- Copa MX: Clausura 2018
- Supercopa MX: 2018

== Personal life ==
Gutiérrez is a native of Adolfo Ruiz Cortines, Guasave, Sinaloa. He was given his name by his mother, who read it in a magazine story.
