= Javier Flórez =

Colombian footballer (born 1982)

Personal information
- Full name: Javier Antonio Flórez Valoyes
- Date of birth: 18 May 1982 (age 44)
- Place of birth: Barranquilla, Colombia
- Position: Midfielder

Senior career*
Years	Team	Apps	(Gls)
2002–2009	Junior		
2010–2011	Atlético Bucaramanga		
2012	Uniautónoma	20	(0)
2012–2013	Cúcuta Deportivo	39	(0)
2014	Chorrillo FC	6	(0)
2015	Boyacá Chicó	15	(0)
- * Club domestic league appearances and goals

Javier Antonio Flórez Valoyes (born 18 May 1982) is a Colombian retired professional footballer.

== Criminal case ==
Flórez was jailed in 2009 for shooting dead a fan after a game. Flórez, a midfielder was playing for Junior Barranquilla against Once Caldas in a two-leg match. The victim, 33-year-old Israel Cantillo, was shot twice, and Flórez fled the scene.

Cantillo was a fan of Flórez's team Junior.

Flórez's lawyers agreed to pay $150 million compensation to the victim's family, and as a consequence Flórez was released from jail in September 2009.

Flórez has cited both self-defence, and being drunk, as the reasons for his crime.
