= José de Jesús Corona =

Mexican footballer (born 1981)

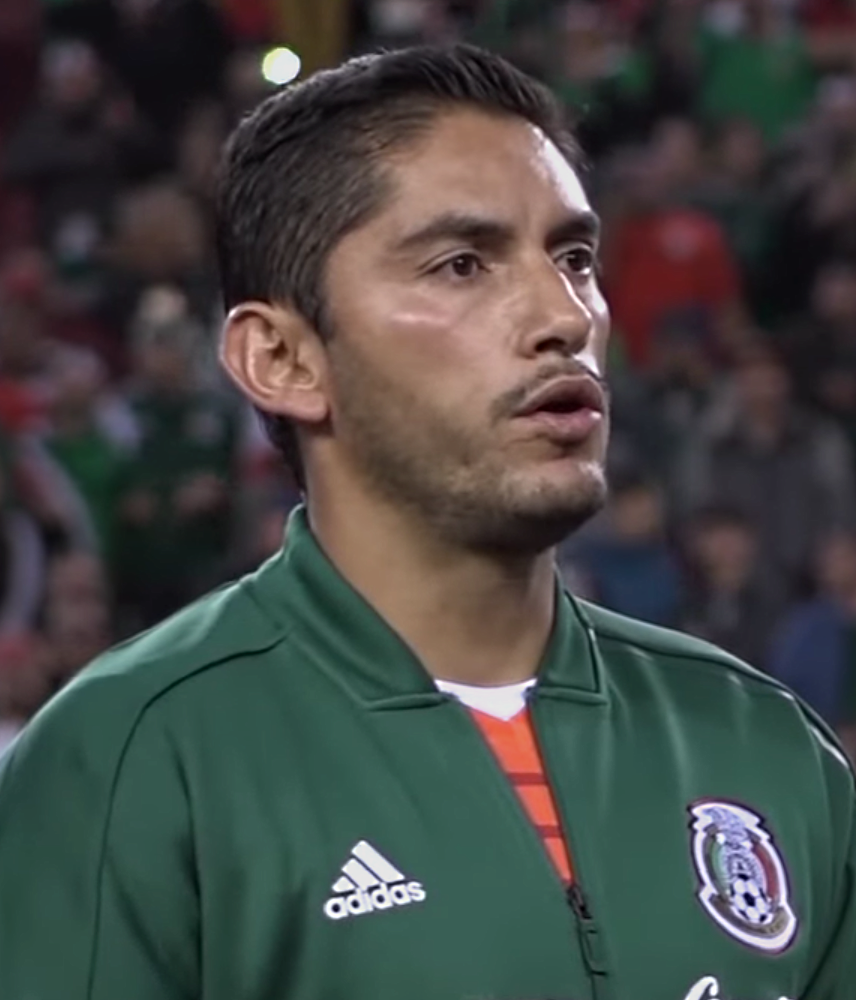
- Corona with Mexico in 2018

Personal information
- Full name: José de Jesús Corona Rodríguez
- Date of birth: 26 January 1981 (age 45)
- Place of birth: Guadalajara, Jalisco, Mexico
- Height: 1.84 m (6 ft 0 in)
- Position: Goalkeeper

Senior career*
Years	Team	Apps	(Gls)
2002–2004	Atlas	47	(0)
2004–2009	Tecos	168	(0)
2005	→ Guadalajara (loan)	0	(0)
2009–2023	Cruz Azul	452	(0)
2023–2025	Tijuana	19	(0)

International career^{‡}
1997	Mexico U17	3	(0)
2004	Mexico U23	6	(0)
2012	Mexico Olympic (O.P.)	6	(0)
2003–2018	Mexico	54	(0)
Medal record
Men's football
Representing Mexico
Olympic Games
Gold medal – first place	2012 London	Team
Pan American Games
Gold medal – first place	2011 Guadalajara	Team
Bronze medal – third place	2003 Santo Domingo	Team
Central American and Caribbean Games
Silver medal – second place	2002 San Salvador	Team
CONCACAF Gold Cup
Gold medal – first place	2009	Team
- * Club domestic league appearances and goals as of 9 February 2025 ‡ National team caps and goals as of 15 October 2022

José de Jesús Corona Rodríguez (born 26 January 1981) is a Mexican former professional footballer who played as a goalkeeper. Widely regarded as one of the greatest Mexican goalkeepers of all time, he made 753 appearances during a 23-year professional career, and won 54 caps for Mexico.

Corona is an Olympic gold medalist, captaining Mexico at the 2012 Summer Olympics.

== Club career ==
=== Atlas ===
Corona started his career in Atlas in 2002. On 26 February 2003, in week five of the season, Corona made his official league debut against UNAM in a 2–1 win. Corona played 47 games with Atlas from 2002 to 2004.

=== Tecos ===
Corona was later transferred to Tecos in the 2004 summer transfer window. He made his league debut playing a full 90 minutes against América. Corona was then loaned to Guadalajara for the 2005 edition of the Copa Libertadores as they reached the semifinals. He is well remembered for his stunning performance against Boca Juniors. Corona had an impressive final season with Tecos before leaving.

=== Cruz Azul ===
On 16 June 2009, Corona was transferred to Cruz Azul for €2.8 million, with whom he signed a three-year contract. Corona made his league debut with Cruz Azul on 2 August 2009 against Pumas in a 3–0 win, earning his first clean sheet with the club. That same year, he helped Cruz Azul reach the league final against Monterrey, where they finished as runners-up after losing both matches of the finals.

On 15 May 2011, during the semi-final second leg of Morelia vs Cruz Azul, Corona was one of the protagonists in the violent brawl that happened when initially a fan invaded the pitch, right after Morelia scored in the 87th minute to make it 3-0(3-2agg) in Morelia's favor, Christian Gimenez responded with a kick behind, then Corona held the fan before he was taken away by security. As things were starting to de-escalate it seems like, the Morelia physio, Sergio Martin who was surrounded by Cruz Azul players, slapped Waldo Ponce which cause a wave of furious reactions from Cruz Azul players, Corona was seeing understandably angry and screamed at him. Not seen by lots of players as the brawl was spread out, Corona came over to the Morelia physio and gave him a violent headbutt which caused the physio to tumble. While he was not sent off in the game, as none of the match officials had a view of the headbutt during the game due to it being out of control, the FMF gave him a 6-match suspension and as a result, would be kicked out in the Concacaf Gold Cup in 2011, as he would be replaced by Jonathan Orozco and would not come back until 28 August 2011 in a game against Pumas UNAM in Apertura 2011.

Corona played the last two games of the Clausura 2013 Copa MX, including the final against Atlante in a match which was scoreless at the end of regulation. Cruz Azul went on to win the game in penalties, giving them their first title in sixteen years. On 9 April 2014, in the second leg of the semi-final between Cruz Azul and Tijuana in the Concacaf Champions League, Corona was given a red card at the end of the game as things were heated between the two sides, not long after he was spatted at by Xolos player, Hernan Pellerano to which Corona did not respond to the act. Corona was initially going to be given a 3-match suspension by CONCACAF which would have cause him to miss the final against Toluca in both of the legs but Cruz Azul appealed by showing them a video that was sent by the club. The appeal was successful as Corona would only miss the first leg of the tie but was able to come back in the second leg in which his team won the final via away goals. Corona was a key figure during the 2013–14 CONCACAF Champions League as Cruz Azul was crowned champions of the tournament for the sixth time in its team history, qualifying them for the 2014 FIFA Club World Cup. Corona played all three matches of that competition, and Cruz Azul finished in fourth place after suffering a 4–0 defeat against Real Madrid and losing to Auckland City in penalties. On 9 May 2015, Corona made his 200th league appearance with Cruz Azul in the last match of the 2014–15 Liga MX season against Leones Negros in a 2–0 loss. Although Cruz Azul had a poor season, Corona was named one of the best goalkeepers in the league with 60 saves and 4 clean sheets at the end of the Clausura 2016.

On 30 July 2016, Corona stopped a penalty kick against Monterrey before they scored two minutes later, ending the match in a 1–1 draw. This ended his two-game streak of clean sheets on the third week of the season. On 30 May 2021, Corona finally won his first Liga MX title with Cruz Azul vs Santos Laguna winning 2–1 on aggregate. This also ended Cruz Azul's 23-year championship drought when at the time, they won it in 1997.

On 23 June 2023, it was announced that Corona would leave Cruz Azul.

=== Tijuana ===
On 24 June 2023, Corona joined Tijuana. Corona retired from professional football on 28 September 2025, in a match against his former club Cruz Azul.

== International career ==
Corona was part of the Mexico U23 at the 2004 Summer Olympics.

Corona was called up to represent Mexico at the 2006 FIFA World Cup as the second-choice goalkeeper. He did not play in any of Mexico's four games.

In 2007, former coach Hugo Sánchez included him in the 23-man squad for the CONCACAF Gold Cup as the third-choice goalkeeper.

Corona looked to be one of the three goalkeepers for Mexico at the 2010 FIFA World Cup, however, after an alleged violent incident where he severely assaulted another man in Guadalajara, Javier Aguirre decided to omit him from the World Cup roster.

Corona was originally chosen to represent Mexico in the 2011 Gold Cup as one of the goalkeepers, but after he participated in a fight in the second leg of the semi-finals of the Clausura 2011 between his team, Cruz Azul, and Monarcas Morelia, José Manuel de la Torre, coach of the national team, decided to cut him from the squads participating in the Gold Cup and the 2011 Copa América due to violent conduct. He was replaced in the squads by Jonathan Orozco. Corona also was suspended for the first six games in the 2011 Apertura season. Yosgart Gutiérrez replaced the suspended Corona during that period.

Corona was named as one of the three overag players for Mexico at the 2012 Summer Olympics. He was also named as the captain of the squad throughout the tournament. He helped the team reach the final, where they defeated Brazil 2–1 to win their first ever medal, the gold medal, at Wembley Stadium.

On 2 June 2014, Corona was named in Mexico's squad for the 2014 World Cup in Brazil as second-choice goalkeeper; he did not feature in any of Mexico's matches.

On 28 March 2015, Corona was first-choice goalkeeper for a friendly match against Ecuador. Corona made incredible saves in a game where Ecuador put over six shots on target, his most impressive save arguably the save of a penalty. Mexico won the match in a narrow 1–0 victory at a sold-out Los Angeles Coliseum.

On 17 May 2015, Corona became the first-choice goalkeeper over Alfredo Talavera and Melitón Hernández to represent Mexico at the 2015 Copa America. On 12 June 2015, he played all 90 minutes against Bolivia in a 0–0 draw. He was later named captain of the squad for the remainder of the tournament after Rafael Márquez suffered an injury.

In May 2018, Corona was named in Mexico's preliminary 28-man squad for the World Cup, and was ultimately included in the final 23-man roster. He did not play in any of the matches.

== Career statistics ==
As of 21 November 2018

Appearances and goals by national team and year
National team	Year	Apps	Goals
Mexico	2005	5	0
Mexico	2006	1	0
Mexico	2007	1	0
Mexico	2009	2	0
Mexico	2010	2	0
Mexico	2011	1	0
Mexico	2012	7	0
Mexico	2013	12	0
Mexico	2014	2	0
Mexico	2015	6	0
Mexico	2016	4	0
Mexico	2017	8	0
Mexico	2018	3	0
Total		54	0

== Honours ==
Cruz Azul

- Liga MX: Guardianes 2021
- Copa MX: Clausura 2013, Apertura 2018
- Campeón de Campeones: 2021
- Supercopa de la Liga MX: 2022
- Supercopa MX: 2019
- CONCACAF Champions League: 2013–14
- Leagues Cup: 2019

Mexico Youth

- Olympic Gold Medal: 2012
- Pan American Games Gold Medal: 2011
- Pan American Games Bronze Medal: 2003
- CONCACAF Olympic Qualifying Championship: 2004
- Central American and Caribbean Games Silver Medal: 2002

Mexico

- CONCACAF Gold Cup: 2009

Individual

- Mexican Primera División Best Rookie: Clausura 2003
- Mexican Primera División Golden Glove: Clausura 2009, Apertura 2010, Clausura 2012, 2020–21
- Liga MX All-Star: 2021
- Liga MX Best XI: Guardianes 2021
- Liga MX Save of the Month: November 2024
