= Rodrigo Gómez (footballer, born 1981) =

Uruguayan footballer

Personal information
- Full name: Rodrigo Ivan Gómez Gómez
- Date of birth: 24 March 1981 (age 45)
- Place of birth: Montevideo, Uruguay
- Height: 1.79 m (5 ft 10 in)
- Position: Defender

Senior career*
Years	Team	Apps	(Gls)
2000–2004	Defensor Sporting	?	(?)
2004–2005	Rampla Juniors	?	(?)
2005–2006	Progreso	?	(?)
2006–2010	Zamora	?	(?)
2010–2011	Mineros	21	(1)
2011	Ermis	2	(0)
2012–2013	San José		
2014–2015	Montevideo City Torque		
- * Club domestic league appearances and goals

Rodrigo Ivan Gómez Gómez (born March 24, 1981, in Montevideo) is a Uruguayan former professional footballer who played as a defender.
