= Rolando Algandona =

Panamanian football defender (born 1989)

Personal information
- Full name: Rolando Antonio Algandona Tejada
- Date of birth: 12 April 1989 (age 37)
- Place of birth: Panama City, Panama
- Height: 1.82 m (6 ft 0 in)
- Position: Defender

Team information
- Current team: Árabe Unido
- Number: 6

Youth career
- 2005–2006: Dacia Chişinău

Senior career*
Years	Team	Apps	(Gls)
2007–2012	San Francisco	98	(4)
2012–2013	Sporting San Miguelito	49	(3)
2014–2017	San Francisco	63	(3)
2017–	Árabe Unido	45	(0)

International career^{‡}
2007–2008	Panama U-20	9	(0)
2010	Panama U-21	2	(0)
2009–	Panama	11	(0)
- * Club domestic league appearances and goals as of 4 October 2018 ‡ National team caps and goals as of 00:44, 15 November 2012 (UTC)

Rolando Antonio Algandona Tejada (born 12 April 1989 in Panama City) is a Panamanian football defender who currently plays for Árabe Unido.

== Club career ==
Algandona started his career at San Francisco and in summer 2012 he joined Sporting San Miguelito only to return to San Francisco in January 2014.

== International career ==
He made his senior debut for Panama on March 13, 2009, against Trinidad & Tobago and has, as of 1 May 2015, earned a total of 10 caps, scoring no goals. He represented his country in 1 FIFA World Cup qualification match.

== Honors ==
=== Club ===
- Liga Panameña de Fútbol (2):
  - 2007 (A), 2008 (A)
