= Allam Bello =

Mexican footballer (born 1988)

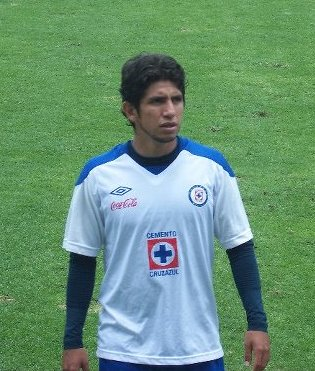

Personal information
- Full name: Allam Bello Huerta
- Date of birth: June 8, 1988 (age 38)
- Place of birth: Ciudad Sahagún, Hidalgo, Mexico
- Height: 1.65 m (5 ft 5 in)
- Position: Left midfielder

Team information
- Current team: Chapulineros de Oaxaca

Senior career*
Years	Team	Apps	(Gls)
2010–2014	Cruz Azul	15	(0)
2012	→ Toros Neza (loan)	7	(0)
2012	→ Lobos BUAP (loan)	9	(0)
2014–2015	→ Irapuato (loan)	26	(3)
2015–2016	Atlante	23	(1)
2016–2017	Alebrijes de Oaxaca	15	(0)
2017–2019	Potros UAEM	42	(1)
2020	Toros Neza	0	(0)
2023–	Chapulineros de Oaxaca	0	(0)
- * Club domestic league appearances and goals as of 14:44, 5 August 2019 (UTC)

Allam Bello Huerta (born June 8, 1988) is a former Mexican footballer who last played as a left midfielder.

== Club career ==
=== Cruz Azul ===
Allam Bello came to Cruz Azul in 2005 eventually making his way into the first team in 2010. He made his first division debut with Cruz Azul under coach Enrique Meza during the Apertura 2010 season against Pachuca August 14, 2010. He came in as a substitute for Alejandro Vela in the 66' minute of the match. Bello played only 8 first divisions with Cruz Azul before being loaned to Toros Neza and Lobos BUAP in 2012, for a year.

After loans with Toros Neza and Lobos BUAP Allam came back to Cruz Azul Hoping to play with the first team. He only played seven league matches and did not see action for one season in Cruz Azul, He was eventually loaned to Irapuato FC in June 2014.

=== Toros Neza ===
Allam Bello arrived on loan to Toros Neza for the Clausura 2012 season. He managed seven appearances with the team.

=== Lobos BUAP ===
Allam Bello arrived from Toros Neza to Lobos BUAP for the Apertura 2012 season, on loan from Cruz Azul. He managed nine appearances for the team. Aside from playing league games with Lobos, Allam Bello played in the Apertura 2012 Copa MX with Lobos and made four appearances, reaching the semifinals and losing on penalties against Correcaminos.

=== Irapuato ===
Allam Bello was once again loaned to a second division team, Irapuato FC and received their iconic #11 jersey previously worn by Ariel González a club legend. He made his debut with Irapuato in the first match day of the Apertura 2014 season against Alebrijes de Oaxaca on July 19, 2014, and scored his first goal against Mérida on August 2, 2014.
