= Álvaro Solís =

Colombian footballer (born 1981)

Personal information
- Full name: Álvaro José Solís Lozano
- Date of birth: August 26, 1981 (age 45)
- Place of birth: Cali, Colombia
- Height: 1.83 m (6 ft 0 in)
- Position: Goalkeeper

Team information
- Current team: Patriotas
- Number: 1

Senior career*
| Years | Team | Apps | (Gls) |
| 2006 | Patriotas | | |
| 2006–2007 | Independiente Santa Fe | 5 | (0) |
| 2008–2011 | La Equidad | 76 | (0) |
| 2010 | → Real Cartagena (loan) | 4 | (0) |
| 2012–2014 | Patriotas | 16 | (0) |
- * Club domestic league appearances and goals as of 16:15, 23 April 2013 (UTC)

Álvaro José Solís Lonazo (born 26 August 1981) is a retired Colombian football (soccer) player. He last played as a goalkeeper for Patriotas in the Copa Mustang.

He was once the No.1 choice keeper for the La Equidad, having signed from Independiente Santa Fe after they acquired Colombian national football team goalkeeper Agustín Julio.
