= Jimmy Schmidt =

Uruguayan footballer (born 1981)

Personal information
- Full name: Jimmy Nicolás Schmidt Vallejo
- Date of birth: 15 December 1981 (age 44)
- Place of birth: Montevideo, Uruguay
- Height: 1.92 m (6 ft 4 in)
- Position: Goalkeeper

Senior career*
Years	Team	Apps	(Gls)
1999–2002	Nacional	5	(0)
2003	Villa Española	6	(0)
2003–2005	Plaza Colonia	20	(0)
2004	→ Mons (loan)	3	(0)
2005	→ Rampla Juniors (loan)	16	(0)
2006	Hércules	4	(0)
2007–2009	Central Español	19	(0)
2009–2010	Sport Ancash	36	(0)
2011	Cobresol	13	(0)
2012–2013	Envigado	17	(0)

International career
2001	Uruguay U20	3	(0)
- * Club domestic league appearances and goals

Jimmy Nicolás Schmidt Vallejo (born 15 December 1981) is a Uruguayan former footballer who played as a goalkeeper. He is the youngest debutant goalkeeper in the history of Club Nacional de Football with 17 years.

== Career ==
Schmidt, nicknamed "Bebote", emerged from Nacional youth system programme, made his unexpected debut aged 17 in 1999 in the First Division. Later in Nacional he had no chance in the first team, so in 2003 he went to Villa Española.

In mid-2003, he signed a new deal with Plaza Colonia where he was used as a first choice goalkeeper. In August 2004, he went on loan to Belgian side R.A.E.C. Mons. But in 2005, he returned to Plaza Colonia and later he was taken to Rampla Juniors by Gustavo Matosas.

In January 2006, he emigrated again to Europe, but now to play for Hércules CF. He signed a five-year contract, but soon after in mid-2006 he was condemned to rescind his contract.

In early 2007, he returned to his homeland to play for Central Español playing again in the Uruguayan Top Division.

During 2009, he played for Peruvian side Sport Ancash, where his team finished 15th in the aggregate table and was though, relegated to the Peruvian Segunda División.

On 23 January 2011, Schmidt signed a two-year contract with the Peruvian team Cobresol FBC.

In January 2012, he signed a new deal with Colombian side Envigado.

== Honours ==
Nacional

- Uruguayan Primera División (3): 2000, 2001, 2002
