= César Villaluz =

Mexican footballer (born 1988)

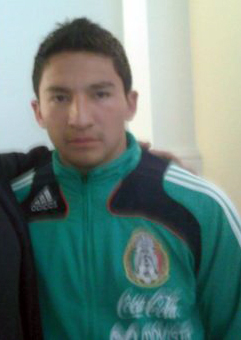

Personal information
- Full name: César Osvaldo Villaluz Martínez
- Date of birth: 18 July 1988 (age 38)
- Place of birth: Mexico City, Mexico
- Height: 1.67 m (5 ft 6 in)
- Position: Midfielder

Youth career
- 2000–2006: Cruz Azul

Senior career*
| Years | Team | Apps | (Gls) |
| 2006–2011 | Cruz Azul | 156 | (16) |
| 2012 | San Luis | 23 | (1) |
| 2013 | Tigres UANL | 0 | (0) |
| 2013–2017 | Chiapas | 4 | (0) |
| 2015 | → Atlético San Luis (loan) | 30 | (4) |
| 2016–2017 | → Celaya (loan) | 34 | (1) |
| 2017–2018 | Cacereño | | |
| 2018–2019 | San Pedro | | |
| 2020 | Oaxaca | 0 | (0) |
| 2021 | Cancún | 3 | (0) |
| 2022 | Halcones de Querétaro | 0 | (0) |
| 2023 | Industriales Naucalpan F.C. | 0 | (0) |

International career
| 2005 | Mexico U17 | 9 | (4) |
| 2007 | Mexico U20 | 8 | (2) |
| 2006 | Mexico U23 | 11 | (1) |
| 2007–2009 | Mexico | 12 | (2) |
Medal record
Representing Mexico
Men's football
FIFA U-17 World Cup
| Winner | 2005 Peru |
- * Club domestic league appearances and goals as of 29 March 2021

César Osvaldo Villaluz Martínez (Note: In this Spanish name, the first or paternal surname is Villaluz and the second or maternal family name is Martínez.) (born 18 July 1988) is a former Mexican professional footballer who last played as a midfielder.

At age seventeen, he participated in the U-17 World Cup with the Mexico national team. His efforts as midfielder assisted the team to victory against Brazil, as well as throughout the entire tournament. Fellow team players Carlos Vela and Giovani dos Santos, both of whom are younger than he, played with him in the 2007 FIFA U-20 World Cup that took place in Canada in 2007. The Mexico national team faced off against the national football teams of Portugal, Gambia, New Zealand, in that order in the group round; Mexico was eliminated by Argentina.

== Skills ==
Villaluz is known for his quick rapid speed and great control while dribbling the ball. What he lacks in height is compensated for by his agility and ability to take on multiple players at once.

== International ==
Villaluz was one of the young Mexicans that won the 2005 FIFA U-17 world cup in Peru. In 2007 most of the U-17 players gathered to try to win the 2007 Canada U-20 World Cup. César's first goal with the senior national team was in a friendly against Guatemala which resulted in a 3–2 loss for Mexico. His second goal for Mexico came in a friendly against China.

== Career stats ==
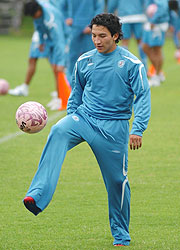
Villaluz with Cruz Azul

| Season | Club | Competition | Matches | Goals |
|---|---|---|---|---|
| 2005–2009 | Mexico | Concacaf | 12 | 2 |
| | | Total | 12 | 2 |

=== International goals ===
| No. | Date | Venue | Opponent | Score | Result | Competition | Ref. |
|---|---|---|---|---|---|---|---|
| 1. | 17 October 2007 | Los Angeles Memorial Coliseum, Los Angeles, United States | Guatemala | 2–3 | Loss | Friendly | |
| 2. | 16 April 2008 | Qwest Field, Seattle, United States | China | 1–0 | Win | Friendly | |

=== International appearances ===
As of 11 March 2009

International appearances
| # | Date | Venue | Opponent | Result | Competition |
|---|---|---|---|---|---|
| 1. | 22 August 2007 | Dick's Sporting Goods Park, Commerce City, United States | Colombia | 0–1 | Friendly |
| 2. | 14 October 2007 | Estadio Benito Juárez, Ciudad Juárez, Mexico | Nigeria | 2–2 | Friendly |
| 3. | 17 October 2007 | Los Angeles, United States | Guatemala | 2–3 | Friendly |
| 4. | 6 February 2008 | Reliant Stadium, Houston, United States | United States | 2–2 | Friendly |
| 5. | 16 April 2008 | Qwest Field, Seattle, United States | China | 1–0 | Friendly |
| 6. | 4 June 2008 | Qualcomm Stadium, San Diego, United States | Argentina | 1–4 | Friendly |
| 7. | 8 June 2008 | Soldier Field, Chicago, United States | Peru | 4–0 | Friendly |
| 8. | 15 June 2008 | Reliant Stadium, Houston, United States | Belize | 2–0 | 2010 FIFA World Cup qualification |
| 9. | 21 June 2008 | Estadio Universitario, San Nicolás, Mexico | Belize | 7–0 | 2010 FIFA World Cup qualification |
| 10. | 12 November 2008 | Chase Field, Phoenix, United States | Ecuador | 2–1 | Friendly |
| 11. | 28 January 2009 | Oakland–Alameda County Coliseum, Oakland, United States | Sweden | 0–1 | Friendly |
| 12. | 11 March 2009 | Dick's Sporting Goods Park, Commerce City, Colorado, United States | Bolivia | 5–1 | Friendly |

== Honours ==
Mexico U17

- FIFA U-17 World Championship: 2005
