= Jamell Ramos =

Colombian footballer (born 1981)

Personal information
- Full name: Jamell Orlando Ramos Hernández
- Date of birth: October 12, 1981 (age 45)
- Place of birth: Barranquilla, Atlántico, Colombia
- Height: 1.79 m (5 ft 10 in)
- Position: Defender

Youth career
- Envigado
- Santa Fe C.D.
- Deportivo Pasto

Senior career*
Years	Team	Apps	(Gls)
2004–2006	Independiente Medellín		
2006	Independiente Santa Fe		
2007	Deportivo Pasto		
2007	Atlético Junior		
2008	Independiente Medellín		
2009	Deportivo Cali		
2010	Cúcuta Deportivo		
2011–	Olimpia		
2012–2013	Once Caldas		
2013–	Atlético Junior		
- * Club domestic league appearances and goals as of 21:56, 21 March 2010 (UTC)

Jamell Orlando Ramos Hernández (born 12 October 1981) is a Colombian footballer, normally playing as a right back. He currently plays for Junior in Colombia.
