= Horacio Cervantes =

Mexican footballer (born 1981)

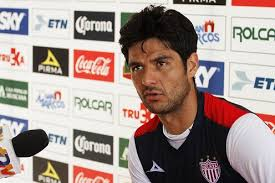

Personal information
- Full name: Horacio Javier Cervantes Chávez
- Date of birth: October 17, 1981 (age 45)
- Place of birth: Mexico City, Mexico
- Height: 1.91 m (6 ft 3 in)
- Position: Defender

Team information
- Current team: UNAM U-19 (Manager)

Senior career*
Years	Team	Apps	(Gls)
2001–2003	Pumas UNAM	15	(0)
2002	→ Morelia (loan)	4	(0)
2004–2006	Atlante	95	(8)
2007	Necaxa	27	(2)
2007–2009	Morelia	59	(4)
2009–2014	Cruz Azul	74	(6)
2011–2012	→ Pachuca (loan)	6	(0)
2012–2013	→ Necaxa (loan)	47	(2)
2014–2015	→ Chiapas (loan)	30	(2)
2015–2017	Veracruz	32	(2)

Managerial career
- 2018–2020: Querétaro Reserves and Academy
- 2020–2021: Mazatlán Reserves and Academy
- 2024–: UNAM Reserves and Academy
- * Club domestic league appearances and goals as of 30 July 2015

Horacio Javier Cervantes Chávez (born 17 October 1981) is a former Mexican footballer, who last played as defender for Veracruz, on loan for Cruz Azul. His brother Diego Alberto Cervantes is also a footballer.
