= Marcelo Palau =

Uruguayan footballer (born 1985)

Personal information
- Full name: Marcelo José Palau Balzaretti
- Date of birth: 1 August 1985 (age 41)
- Place of birth: Montevideo, Uruguay
- Height: 1.77 m (5 ft 10 in)
- Position: Midfielder

Senior career*
Years	Team	Apps	(Gls)
2007	Atenas	?	(1)
2007–2008	Rampla Juniors	25	(2)
2008	→ Deportivo Quito (loan)	26	(0)
2008–2009	Montevideo Wanderers	23	(2)
2010	Puebla	12	(3)
2010	Nacional Montevideo	7	(0)
2011	Cruz Azul	15	(1)
2011	Linense	0	(0)
2012–2017	Guaraní	72	(12)
2013	→ Atlético Paranaense (loan)	2	(0)
2018–2020	Cerro Porteño	70	(6)
2021	Sportivo Luqueño	23	(0)
2022	Nacional Asunción	25	(0)
2023	Guaraní	8	(0)

Managerial career
- 2024: Tacuary
- 2025: 2 de Mayo
- * Club domestic league appearances and goals

Marcelo José Palau Balzaretti (born 1 August 1985) is a Uruguayan football manager and former player who played as a midfielder.
