= Manuel Mosquera (footballer, born 1984) =

Panamanian footballer

Personal information
- Full name: Manuel Esteban Mosquera García
- Date of birth: 14 October 1984 (age 42)
- Place of birth: Yaviza, Panama
- Height: 1.93 m (6 ft 4 in)
- Position: Striker

Team information
- Current team: Río Abajo

Senior career*
Years	Team	Apps	(Gls)
2005	Atlético Veragüense	39	(19)
2006–2007	Árabe Unido	45	(23)
2007	Academia	22	(11)
2008	Árabe Unido	40	(24)
2009	Itagüí Ditaires	22	(9)
2009–2010	Árabe Unido	18	(6)
2011–2012	Atlético Veragüense	16	(2)
2012	Plaza Amador	14	(1)
2013	Victoria	13	(2)
2014–	Río Abajo		

International career^{‡}
2009–2012	Panama	2	(0)
- * Club domestic league appearances and goals as of 31 July 2006 ‡ National team caps and goals as of 31 July 2006

Manuel Esteban Mosquera García (Note: In this Spanish name, the first or paternal surname is Mosquera and the second or maternal family name is García.) (born 14 October 1984) is a football striker who currently plays in Panama for Río Abajo.

== Club career ==
Mosquera played for Atlético Veragüense and Árabe Unido and had spells in Colombia with second division teams Academia and Itagüí Ditaires. He joined Plaza Amador for the 2012 Apertura season and moved abroad again in January 2013 to play for Honduran side Victoria. In April 2013 he got severely injured after a charge of Atlético Choloma defender Johnny Barrios, fracturing his tibia and fibula. He was sidelined for months and Barrios received a 5-match penalty.

In December 2013, Mosquera joined Río Abajo.

== International career ==
Mosquera made his debut for Panama in a January 2009 UNCAF Nations Cup match against Costa Rica and has earned a total of 2 caps, scoring no goals. He represented his country at the 2009 UNCAF Nations Cup in Honduras where Panama were champions.

His final international was a January 2012 friendly match against the United States.

== Honors ==
=== Club ===
- Liga Panameña de Fútbol (1): 2008 (C)
- Liga Panameña de Fútbol: Apertura 2009 II

== National Teams ==
- UNCAF Nations Cup Champions (1): 2009
