= Hiram Mondragón =

Mexican footballer (born 1989)

Hiram Mondragon
Personal information
- Full name: Hiram Mondragón Molina
- Date of birth: 20 January 1989 (age 37)
- Place of birth: Mexico City, Mexico
- Height: 1.84 m (6 ft 1/2 in)
- Position: Defender

Team information
- Current team: FC Laufen

Youth career
- Cruz Azul

Senior career*
Years	Team	Apps	(Gls)
2007–2008	Cruz Azul Jasso		
2008–2009	Cruz Azul Xochimilco		
2010–2011	Cruz Azul Hidalgo		
2011–2013	Cruz Azul Jasso		
2013–2015	FC Aesch		
2016–	FC Laufen		
- * Club domestic league appearances and goals

Hiram Mondragon Molina; (born January 20, 1989) in Mexico City, is a Mexican footballer, currently as defender for FC Laufen.
