= Pedro Aparicio (footballer) =

Peruvian footballer (born 1982)

Personal information
- Full name: Pedro Antonio Kohji Aparicio Mori
- Date of birth: June 11, 1982 (age 44)
- Place of birth: Lima, Peru
- Height: 1.89 m (6 ft 2 1/2 in)
- Position: Centre back

Team information
- Current team: Deportivo UPAO

Youth career
- Alianza Lima

Senior career*
Years	Team	Apps	(Gls)
2001–2002	Alianza Lima		
2003	Atlético Universidad		
2003	Estudiantes de Medicina		
2004	Univ. César Vallejo		
2005	Alianza Lima		
2005	Univ. César Vallejo		
2006	FBC Melgar	21	(0)
2007	Sport Boys	33	(4)
2008–2010	Alianza Lima	70	(11)
2012	Deportivo UPAO		
- * Club domestic league appearances and goals as of 25 November 2011

Pedro Antonio Kohji Aparicio Mori (born 11 June 1982 in Lima) is a Peruvian footballer who plays as a center back. He has played for several Peruvian clubs, and currently plays for Deportivo UPAO in the Peruvian Second Division.

== Honours ==
=== Club ===
Alianza Lima

- Peruvian First Division (1): 2001
