= Waldo Ponce =

Chilean football defender (born 1982)

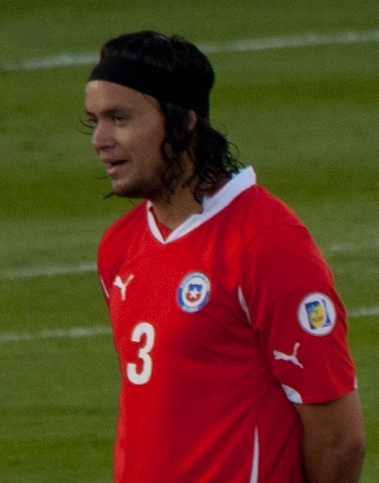
- Ponce in 2011

Personal information
- Full name: Waldo Alonso Ponce Carrizo
- Date of birth: 4 December 1982 (age 43)
- Place of birth: Los Andes, Chile
- Height: 1.83 m (6 ft 0 in)
- Position: Centre-back

Youth career
- Universidad de Chile

Senior career*
Years	Team	Apps	(Gls)
2001–2007	Universidad de Chile	145	(10)
2003–2004	→ VfL Wolfsburg (loan)	5	(0)
2008–2009	Vélez Sársfield	21	(3)
2010–2011	O'Higgins	0	(0)
2010	→ Universidad Católica (loan)	7	(0)
2010	→ Racing de Santander (loan)	2	(0)
2011–2012	Cruz Azul	31	(1)
2012	→ Universidad de Chile (loan)	0	(0)
2013–2015	Universidad de Chile	2	(0)
2015–2017	Universidad de Concepción	9	(2)
Total		222	(16)

International career
2005–2011	Chile	42	(4)
- * Club domestic league appearances and goals

Waldo Alonso Ponce Carrizo (born 4 December 1982) is a Chilean former professional footballer who played as a defender.

== Club career ==
=== Universidad de Chile ===
A product of the Universidad de Chile youth system, Ponce had a trial with Dutch side Ajax at the age of seventeen. He made his professional debut with Universidad de Chile in 2001. In his three years with Universidad de Chile, Ponce displayed good aerial ability both in defence and attack. This, combined with his strong and accurate free kicks, led Ponce to be loaned to German team VfL Wolfsburg, being this his first international club. In this club, Ponce only played two league matches.

Ponce returned to Universidad de Chile at the end of 2004. He was immediately inserted into the starting lineup and was an integral part of Universidad de Chile's making an appearance in the 2005 Copa Libertadores. Ponce reached the final of the tournament Clausura 2005 but his team lost when he missed the final penalty which was saved by José María Buljubasich. In 2007, Ponce lived one of his best moments on Universidad de Chile, but on 11 April 2007, he was injured during a training of the club. The player was nearly three months injured, however he fully recovered in September 2007.

=== Vélez Sársfield ===
In February 2008, Ponce joined Vélez Sársfield of Argentine Primera División for a three-year contract with a transfer fee of $800,000. He was frequently injured and missed many matches, but on 13 April 2008, he made his Vélez debut against San Martín de San Juan, in a 2–0 Vélez's victory. Ponce scored his first team goal against Gimnasia La Plata, in a 2–1 loss. Due to the departure of Hernán Pellerano to UD Almería, Ponce became a more consistent player in Vélez' lineup. But he got injured once again, and missed the Torneo Clausura tournament for one month. The injury allowed Nicolás Otamendi to take his place in the starting line-up.

In the Torneo Clausura 2009, Ponce played very few matches, but Vélez were crowned champions. During the Torneo Clausura, he scored two goals in the same match against Tigre, for 3–0 Vélez victory, being the man of the match. During the summer of 2010, he was released from the club.

After nearly signing with Premier League Wigan Athletic, he signed with O'Higgins on a one-year deal.

=== Universidad Católica and Spain ===
On 4 February 2010, Ponce joined Universidad Católica on a six-month loan for O'Higgins. On 5 February 2010, Ponce was officially presented as player of Católica. Shortly after the player's presentation, the coach of the club, Marco Antonio Figueroa, expressed that he had not asked the player to join the team.

On 17 February 2010, he made his Católica debut against his former club O'Higgins, in a 1–0 Catolica away loss. Seven days later on 24 February 2010, Ponce made his 2010 Copa Libertadores debut against the Brazilian club Flamengo, in a 2–0 loss. After the Chilean earthquake on 27 February of the same year, he played against his former club Universidad de Chile for the Libertadores, in a 2–2 draw. However the club failed to advance to the second stage, and he ended with zero goals in six appearances in the Copa Libertadores.

Because of his good performance at the 2010 FIFA World Cup, Ponce returned to O'Higgins, but was loaned to Liga BBVA club Racing de Santander on 31 August 2010 for a fee of $400.000 on a six-month deal. He made his Racing debut against Real Sociedad in a friendly match with three times, in a 4–3 Racing's victory. On 3 October 2010, Ponce made his official Racing debut against Villarreal CF, in a 2–0 defeat. He was on the bench on many occasions, and he played his second league match against Real Madrid.

=== Cruz Azul ===
In January 2011, Ponce was supposed to play for O'Higgins, but was then transferred to Cruz Azul of Mexican Primera División for a one-year deal.

On 8 January 2011, Ponce made his Cruz Azul debut against Estudiantes Tecos on a 4–1 victory for the Cementeros.

== International career ==
Ponce made his debut for the Chile national team at the 2006 Pacific Cup against Peru. On 24 March 2006, Ponce scored in a friendly match against Paraguay with a free kick for a 3–2 Chile victory. He would have been a member of Chile's 2007 Copa América squad, but because of an injury during a training session with Universidad de Chile he missed the tournament.

During the 2010 FIFA World Cup qualification, Ponce was a consistent player in Chile's lineup. He scored his first official goal during a qualification match in a 4–2 win against Colombia. In June 2010, he was selected for Chile's FIFA World Cup 2010 squad.

Ponce played in the opening match for Chile at the World Cup against Honduras, a 1–0 Chile victory. In the third group match against Spain, he received his second yellow card and received a one-match ban, missing the Round of 16 match against Brazil, which Chile lost 3–0, eliminating them from the tournament. Shortly after Chile's World Cup participation, the Chilean team were presented at the Moneda Palace by Chilean president Sebastian Piñera, and Ponce along with his team, were presented with the Bicentenario medal.

== Other works ==
Ponce performs as a football commentator for Radio Agricultura and Radio Futuro.

== Career statistics ==
#	Date	Venue	Opponent	Score	Result	Competition
1.	24 March 2006	Estadio Sausalito, Viña del Mar, Chile	Paraguay	2–1	3–2	Friendly Match
2.	10 October 2009	Estadio Atanasio Girardot, Medellín, Colombia	Colombia	1–1	4–2	2010 FIFA World Cup qualification
3.	19 June 2011	Estadio Monumental, Santiago, Chile	Estonia	2–0	4–0	Friendly Match
4.	11 October 2011	Estadio Monumental, Santiago, Chile	Peru	1–0	4–2	2014 FIFA World Cup qualification

== Honours ==
Universidad de Chile

- Chilean Primera División: 2000, 2014 Apertura
- Copa Chile: 2000, 2012–13

Vélez Sársfield

- Argentine Primera División: 2009 Torneo Clausura

Universidad Católica

- Chilean Primera División: 2010

Individual

- Bicentenario Medal: 2010
