= 2012–13 Liga MX season =

66th professional season of the top-flight football league in Mexico

Liga MX
- Season: 2012–13
- Champions: Apertura: Tijuana (1st title); Clausura: América (11th title)
- Relegated: Querétaro
- Champions League: Tijuana; Toluca; Cruz Azul; América
- Copa Libertadores: Toluca; Tijuana; León
- Matches: 326
- Goals: 804 (2.47 per match)
- Top goalscorer: Apertura: Christian Benítez; Esteban Paredes (11 goals); Clausura: Christian Benítez (12 goals)
- Biggest home win: Apertura: UANL 5–0 UNAM (October 20, 2012); Clausura: Cruz Azul 5–0 Tijuana (April 13, 2013)
- Biggest away win: Apertura: Chiapas 0–4 UANL (July 20, 2012); Querétaro 0–4 América (August 18, 2012); Clausura: Monterrey 1–5 Cruz Azul (May 4, 2013)
- Highest scoring: Apertura: América 4–2 Chiapas (July 28, 2012); Morelia 3–3 San Luis (August 3, 2012); Clausura: Atlante 4–3 Chiapas (January 27, 2013)

The 2012–13 Liga MX season was the 66th professional top-flight football league season in Mexico, and the first under the league's current identity as "Liga MX". The season was split into two competitions: the Torneo Apertura and the Torneo Clausura—each of identical format and contested by the same eighteen teams.

== Clubs ==
Eighteen teams participated in the season. Estudiantes Tecos was relegated to the Liga de Ascenso after accumulating the lowest coefficient over the past three consecutive seasons, ending its 36-year stay in the league. León was promoted, and as the winner of the 2011–12 Liga de Ascenso season, León returned to the top flight after being relegated 10 years earlier.

Location of teams in the 2012–13 Liga MX

=== Stadiums and locations ===
Club	Home City	Stadium	Capacity
América	Mexico City	Azteca	105,000
Atlante	Cancún	Andrés Quintana Roo	20,000
Atlas	Guadalajara	Jalisco	63,200
Chiapas	Tuxtla Gutiérrez	Víctor Manuel Reyna	31,500
Cruz Azul	Mexico City	Estadio Azul	35,000
Guadalajara	Guadalajara	Omnilife	49,850
León	León, Guanajuato	León	33,943
Monterrey	Monterrey	Tecnológico	38,000
Morelia	Morelia	Morelos	35,000
Pachuca	Pachuca, Hidalgo	Hidalgo	30,000
Puebla	Puebla	Cuauhtémoc	48,650
Querétaro	Querétaro	La Corregidora	36,500
San Luis	San Luis Potosí	Alfonso Lastras Ramírez	24,000
Santos Laguna	Torreón	Corona	30,000
Tijuana	Tijuana	Caliente	21,000
Toluca	Toluca	Nemesio Díez	27,000
UANL	San Nicolás	Universitario	42,000
UNAM	Mexico City	Olímpico Universitario	63,000

=== Personnel and kits ===
Team	Manager	Kit manufacturer	Shirt sponsor
América	(Mexico) Miguel Herrera	Nike	Bimbo, Coca-Cola
Atlante	(Mexico) Daniel Guzmán	Garcis	Riviera Maya, Cancún, ADO, Grupo Pegaso
Atlas	(Mexico) Tomás Boy	Atletica	Lubricantes Akron, Coca-Cola
Chiapas	(Mexico) José Guadalupe Cruz	Joma	Boing!, Seguro Popular, XL-3, Banco Azteca
Cruz Azul	(Mexico) Guillermo Vázquez	Umbro	Cemento Cruz Azul, Coca-Cola
Guadalajara	(Mexico) Benjamín Galindo	adidas	Bimbo
León	(Uruguay) Gustavo Matosas	Pirma	Caja Popular Mexicana, Coca-Cola
Monterrey	(Mexico) Víctor Manuel Vucetich	Nike	Bimbo, BBVA Bancomer
Morelia	(Argentina) Carlos Bustos	Nike	Roshfrans, Cinépolis
Pachuca	(Mexico) Gabriel Caballero	Nike	Gamesa, Mobil Super, ADO, Nextel
Puebla	(Mexico) Manuel Lapuente	Franja Sport	Volkswagen, Coca-Cola
Querétaro	(Mexico) Ignacio Ambríz	Pirma/Atletica	Libertad Servicios Financieros, Boing!
San Luis	(Mexico) Gerardo Silva	Pirma	Caja Popular Mexicana, Coca-Cola
Santos Laguna	(Portugal) Pedro Caixinha	Puma	Soriana, Peñoles, Pepsi, Lala
Tijuana	(Argentina) Antonio Mohamed	Nike	Caliente
Toluca	(Mexico) Enrique Meza	Under Armour	Banamex
UANL	(Brazil) Ricardo Ferretti	adidas	Cemex, Cemento Monterrey
UNAM	(Mexico) Juan Antonio Torres	Puma	Banamex

=== Managerial changes ===
Team	Outgoing manager	Manner of departure	Date of vacancy	Replaced by	Date of appointment	Position in table
Pre-Apertura changes
Guadalajara	(Mexico) Alberto Coyote	End of tenure as caretaker	April 23, 2012	(Netherlands) John Van't Schip	April 23, 2012	15th
San Luis	(Mexico) Sergio Bueno	Resigned	April 29, 2012	(Mexico) José Luis Trejo	May 23, 2012	16th
UNAM	(Mexico) Guillermo Vázquez	Mutual consent	May 9, 2012	(Mexico) Joaquín del Olmo	May 25, 2012	13th
Pachuca	(Mexico) Efraín Flores	Mutual consent	May 9, 2012	(Mexico) Hugo Sánchez	May 15, 2012	6th
Morelia	(Mexico) Tomás Boy	Mutual consent	May 15, 2012	(Argentina) Rubén Omar Romano	May 21, 2012	4th
Cruz Azul	(Mexico) Enrique Meza	Mutual consent	May 15, 2012	(Mexico) Guillermo Vázquez	May 24, 2012	9th
Atlante	(Mexico) José Luis González China	End of tenure as caretaker	May 16, 2012	(Argentina) Ricardo La Volpe	May 16, 2012	14th
Toluca	(Uruguay) Wilson Graniolatti	Sacked	May 17, 2012	(Mexico) Enrique Meza	May 18, 2012	10th
Querétaro	(Argentina) Ángel Comizzo	Sacked	May 21, 2012	(Mexico) Carlos de los Cobos	May 21, 2012	17th
Apertura changes
Puebla	(Uruguay) Daniel Bartolotta	Sacked	August 17, 2012	(Spain) Carlos Muñoz Cobo	August 17, 2012	17th
Puebla	(Spain) Carlos Muñoz Cobo	End of tenure as caretaker	August 21, 2012	(Mexico) Daniel Guzmán	August 22, 2012	17th
Atlas	(Mexico) Juan Carlos Chávez	Mutual consent	August 27, 2012	(Mexico) Rubén Duarte	August 27, 2012	11th
San Luis	(Mexico) José Luis Trejo	Sacked	August 27, 2012	(Ecuador) Alex Aguinaga	August 27, 2012	17th
UNAM	(Mexico) Joaquín del Olmo	Sacked	August 28, 2012	(Mexico) Juan Antonio Torres	August 28, 2012	12th
Atlas	(Mexico) Rubén Duarte	End of tenure as caretaker	August 30, 2012	(Mexico) Tomás Boy	August 30, 2012	11th
UNAM	(Mexico) Juan Antonio Torres	End of tenure as caretaker	August 31, 2012	(Mexico) Mario Carrillo	September 1, 2012	9th
Querétaro	(Mexico) Carlos de los Cobos	Sacked	September 4, 2012	(Mexico) Sergio Bueno	September 4, 2012	18th
UNAM	(Mexico) Mario Carrillo	Sacked	October 28, 2012	(Mexico) Juan Antonio Torres	October 30, 2012	11th
Puebla	(Mexico) Daniel Guzmán	Resigned	October 30, 2012	(Chile) Carlos Poblete	October 30, 2012	16th
Pre-Clausura changes
Pachuca	(Mexico) Hugo Sánchez	Sacked	November 15, 2012	(Mexico) Gabriel Caballero	November 15, 2012	13th
Santos Laguna	(Mexico) Benjamín Galindo	Sacked	November 15, 2012	(Portugal) Pedro Caixinha	November 20, 2012	9th
San Luis	(Ecuador) Alex Aguinaga	Sacked	November 15, 2012	(Mexico) Eduardo Fentanes	November 20, 2012	15th
Puebla	(Chile) Carlos Poblete	End of tenure as caretaker	December 7, 2012	(Mexico) Manuel Lapuente	December 7, 2012	16th
Guadalajara	(Netherlands) John Van't Schip	Sacked	January 2, 2013	(Mexico) Benjamín Galindo	January 2, 2013	9th
Clausura changes
Atlante	(Argentina) Ricardo La Volpe	Left due to health issues	January 28, 2013	(Mexico) Daniel Guzmán	January 29, 2013	15th
Querétaro	(Mexico) Sergio Bueno	Sacked	February 4, 2013	(Mexico) Ignacio Ambriz	February 4, 2013	14th
Morelia	(Argentina) Rubén Omar Romano	Sacked	February 18, 2013	(Argentina) Carlos Bustos	February 18, 2013	11th
San Luis	(Mexico) Eduardo Fentanes	Sacked	February 18, 2013	(Uruguay) Carlos María Morales	February 18, 2013	18th
San Luis	(Uruguay) Carlos María Morales	Resigned	March 12, 2013	(Mexico) Gerardo Silva	March 12, 2013	18th

== Torneo Apertura ==
The 2012 Apertura was the opening competition of the season. The regular season began on July 20, 2012, and ended on November 11, 2012. The Liguilla tournament began on November 14, 2012, and ended on December 2, 2012. Santos Laguna had been successful in defending their title since 2009.

=== Regular phase ===
==== League table ====
Pos	Team	Pld	W	D	L	GF	GA	GD	Pts	Qualification
1	Toluca	17	10	4	3	28	17	+11	34	2013 Copa Libertadores Second Stage (Note: All 3 teams who qualified for Copa Libertadores would qualify for the Playoffs of this competition.) (Note: The first 8 places in the table qualify for the Playoffs.)
2	Tijuana	17	9	7	1	23	15	+8	34	2013 Copa Libertadores Second Stage
3	León	17	10	3	4	34	17	+17	33	2013 Copa Libertadores First Stage
4	América	17	8	7	2	28	15	+13	31	Advance to the Liguilla
5	Morelia	17	6	9	2	25	16	+9	27	Advance to the Liguilla
6	Cruz Azul	17	6	8	3	22	15	+7	26	Advance to the Liguilla
7	Monterrey	17	5	8	4	23	23	0	23	Advance to the Liguilla and cannot qualify for South American competitions (Note: Guadalajara, Monterrey, Santos Laguna and UANL cannot qualify for the 2013 Copa Libertadores because they are participating in the 2012–13 CONCACAF Champions League competition.)
8	Guadalajara	17	6	5	6	17	17	0	23	Advance to the Liguilla and cannot qualify for South American competitions
9	Santos Laguna	17	6	5	6	22	26	−4	23	Cannot qualify for South American competitions
10	UNAM	17	7	2	8	18	23	−5	23	
11	Chiapas	17	6	4	7	23	24	−1	22	
12	UANL	17	5	6	6	23	18	+5	21	Cannot qualify for South American competitions
13	Pachuca	17	5	6	6	13	20	−7	21	
14	Atlante	17	5	5	7	23	28	−5	20	
15	San Luis	17	3	6	8	14	24	−10	15	
16	Puebla	17	3	4	10	16	26	−10	13	
17	Atlas	17	1	9	7	16	27	−11	12	
18	Querétaro	17	1	4	12	11	30	−19	7	

Updated to match(es) played on 7 November 2012. Source: MedioTiempo
Rules for classification: 1) points; 2) goal difference; 3) number of goals scored.

=== Results ===
Home \ Away	AMÉ	ATE	ATL	CHI	CAZ	GUA	LEÓ	MON	MOR	PAC	PUE	QUE	SLU	SLA	TIJ	TOL	UNL	UNM
América			1–1	4–2		1–3	2–1		1–1	4–0				2–0	0–1			
Atlante	2–2		1–0			3–1	2–3		2–2	0–0				1–3	1–2			
Atlas				1–1	1–1						2–2	0–0	2–3			1–3	0–0	1–1
Chiapas		1–2			1–0						2–0	2–1	4–0			2–0	0–4	3–0
Cruz Azul	1–1	4–0				0–0	1–1	1–1	0–0	1–1		3–2				3–0		
Guadalajara			2–0	1–1				1–2	1–1		1–1			0–1	0–2		2–1	0–0
León			3–1	4–1		1–2		2–0	1–3					3–0	4–0		2–0	2–1
Monterrey	0–0	1–1	1–1	2–1								3–2		3–2	1–1	2–2	0–1	
Morelia			2–0	1–1				1–0			3–0		3–3	2–0	1–1		1–1	0–1
Pachuca			0–3	2–1		1–0	1–1	1–1	3–2					0–0	2–2		1–0	
Puebla	0–1	1–2			0–1		1–1	2–3		2–0		0–1	1–0			1–3		
Querétaro	0–4	0–1				0–1	0–2		1–2	0–1				1–1	0–1			
San Luis	1–2	2–2			1–2	0–1	0–2	1–1		1–0		0–0				0–2		
Santos Laguna			2–1	0–0	2–1						2–2		2–1		2–2		3–1	1–2
Tijuana			1–1	2–0	2–2						2–0		0–0			1–0	2–1	1–0
Toluca	1–1	1–0				2–1	2–1		0–0	1–0		4–1		4–1				
UANL	1–1	2–1			2–0						1–2	2–2	0–0			1–1		5–0
UNAM	0–1	3–2			0–1			3–2		1–0	2–1	3–0	0–1			1–2		

Updated to match(es) played on 11 November 2012. Source: FeMexFut (in Spanish)
Legend: Blue = home team win; Yellow = draw; Red = away team win.

=== Top goalscorers ===
Players ranked by goals scored, then alphabetically by last name.

Rank	Player	Club	Goals
1	(Ecuador) Christian Benítez	América	11
1	(Chile) Esteban Paredes	Atlante	11
3	(Uruguay) Nelson Sebastián Maz	León	8
3	(Colombia) Luis Gabriel Rey	Chiapas	8
3	(Colombia) Duvier Riascos	Tijuana	8
3	(Mexico) Miguel Sabah	Morelia	8
7	(Argentina) Mariano Pavone	Cruz Azul	7
7	(Colombia) Carlos Quintero	Santos Laguna	7
9	(Uruguay) Matías Britos	León	6
9	(Argentina) Alfredo Moreno	Tijuana	6
9	(Chile) Héctor Mancilla	Atlas	6
9	(Mexico) Rafael Marquez Lugo	Guadalajara	6
9	(Mexico) Carlos Peña	León	6
9	(Chile) Humberto Suazo	Monterrey	6
9	(Panama) Luis Tejada	Toluca	6

=== Hat-tricks ===
Player	For	Against	Result	Date
(Mexico) Alberto Acosta	UANL	UNAM	5–0	October 20, 2012
(Ecuador) Christian Benítez	América	Pachuca	4–0	November 3, 2012

=== Final phase ===
==== Bracket ====
Quarter-finals
1	Toluca	2	3	5
8	Guadalajara	1	1	2
4	América	2	1	3
5	Morelia	0	2	2
2	Tijuana	1	1	2
7	Monterrey	0	1	1
3	León	1	3	4
6	Cruz Azul	2	0	3

Semi-finals
1	Toluca	2	1	3
4	América	0	2	2
2	Tijuana	0	3	3
3	León	2	0	2

Finals
1	Toluca	1	0	1
2	Tijuana	2	2	4

==== Quarter-finals ====
Team 1	Agg.	Team 2	1st leg	2nd leg
Guadalajara	2–5	Toluca	1–2	1–3
Monterrey	1–2	Tijuana	0–1	1–1
Cruz Azul	2–4	León	2–1	0–3
Morelia	2–3	América	0–2	2–1

==== Semi-finals ====
Team 1	Agg.	Team 2	1st leg	2nd leg
América	2–3	Toluca	0–2	2–1
León	2–3	Tijuana	2–0	0–3

==== Finals ====
Team 1	Agg.	Team 2	1st leg	2nd leg
Tijuana	4–1	Toluca	2–1	2–0

Notes

- If the two teams are tied after both legs, the higher seeded team advances.
- Both finalists qualify to the 2013–14 CONCACAF Champions League (champion in Pot A, runner-up in Pot B).

== Torneo Clausura ==
The 2013 Clausura is the second and final competition of the season. The regular season began on January 4, 2013. Tijuana were defending their inaugural champion title.

=== Regular phase ===
==== League table ====
Pos	Team	Pld	W	D	L	GF	GA	GD	Pts	Qualification
1	UANL	17	10	5	2	30	14	+16	35	Advance to the Final phase
2	América	17	9	5	3	30	15	+15	32	Advance to the Final phase
3	Atlas	17	9	5	3	20	13	+7	32	Advance to the Final phase
4	Morelia	17	8	6	3	25	18	+7	30	Advance to the Final phase
5	Cruz Azul	17	8	5	4	35	19	+16	29	Advance to the Final phase
6	Santos Laguna	17	8	5	4	20	13	+7	29	Advance to the Final phase
7	UNAM	17	8	5	4	19	14	+5	29	Advance to the Final phase
8	Querétaro^{1}	17	6	6	5	18	20	−2	24	Disqualified from postseason competition (Note: Querétaro relegated to Ascenso MX for the 2013–14 season. Monterrey, at 9th place, promoted to the liguilla.)
9	Monterrey	17	7	2	8	22	22	0	23	Advance to the Final phase
10	Tijuana	17	6	3	8	19	21	−2	21	
11	Pachuca	17	6	2	9	18	25	−7	20	
12	Puebla	17	5	4	8	20	27	−7	19	
13	Toluca	17	5	3	9	14	21	−7	18	
14	Chiapas	17	4	5	8	21	32	−11	17	
15	León	17	3	7	7	14	18	−4	16	
16	San Luis	17	4	4	9	19	25	−6	16	
17	Guadalajara	17	3	7	7	15	24	−9	16	
18	Atlante	17	4	1	12	16	33	−17	13	

Updated to match(es) played on May 4, 2013. Source: www.ligamx.net
Rules for classification: 1) points; 2) goal difference; 3) number of goals scored.

=== Results ===
Home \ Away	AMÉ	ATE	ATL	CAZ	GUA	CHI	LEÓ	MON	MOR	PAC	PUE	QUE	SLU	SLA	TIJ	TOL	UNL	UNM
América		4–0		3–0				2–1			1–1	3–0	1–1			2–2	0–2	1–0
Atlante				0–3		4–3		3–1			2–0	1–1	0–1			0–1	1–3	1–2
Atlas	2–1	2–1			1–0		0–1	2–1	0–0	2–0				1–2	1–0			
Cruz Azul			1–2			1–1					4–0		2–1	1–0	5–0		1–2	1–1
Guadalajara	0–2	1–2		1–1			2–1			1–0		1–2	1–1			1–1		
Chiapas	0–2		1–2		3–2		2–2	1–1	1–1	1–2				1–3	2–0			
León	1–1	1–0		2–2						0–0	0–1	2–2	2–0			1–2		
Monterrey				1–5	0–1		2–1		1–0	2–0	3–0		3–2					3–0
Morelia	1–1	4–0		3–3	1–1		1–0			3–2		1–0				2–1		
Pachuca	2–4	2–0		2–1							2–1	1–1	2–1			1–0		1–2
Puebla			1–1		1–1	1–2			3–1					2–1	1–2		1–2	0–1
Querétaro			0–0	1–2		1–1		1–0			2–3		2–1			1–0	0–2	2–1
San Luis			2–2			3–0			1–2		1–3			1–1	1–0		1–2	0–2
Santos Laguna	1–0	2–1			2–0		2–0	1–0	1–2	0–1		1–1				2–1		
Tijuana	1–2	2–0			4–0		1–0	2–2	1–2	2–0		0–1		0–0				
Toluca			0–1	0–2		2–1		1–0			1–1		0–1		1–0		1–4	0–1
UANL			1–0		1–1	3–0	0–0	0–1	1–1	3–1				1–1	2–2			
UNAM			1–1		1–1	3–0	0–0		1–0					0–0	1–2		2–1	

Updated to match(es) played on 27 April 2013. Source: FeMexFut (in Spanish)
Legend: Blue = home team win; Yellow = draw; Red = away team win.

=== Top goalscorers ===
As of May 5, 2013. Source LigaMX.net – Estadística – Tabla de Goleo Individual
Players ranked by goals scored, then alphabetically by last name.

Pos	Player	Club	Goals
1	(Ecuador) Christian Benítez	América	17
2	(Chile) Héctor Mancilla	Morelia	12
3	(Argentina) Mariano Pavone	Cruz Azul	12
4	(Mexico) Raúl Jiménez	América	10
5	(Argentina) Emmanuel Villa	UANL	9
7	(Argentina) Lucas Lobos	UANL	8
7	(Mexico) Oribe Peralta	Santos Laguna	8
9	(Ecuador) Félix Borja	Puebla	7
9	(Mexico) Javier Cortés	UNAM	7
9	(Mexico) Rafael Márquez Lugo	Guadalajara	7

=== Hat-tricks ===
Player	For	Against	Result	Date
(Argentina) Emanuel Villa	UANL	Chiapas	3–0	January 5, 2013
(Ecuador) Christian Benítez	América	Cruz Azul	3–0	March 2, 2013
(Ecuador) Christian Benítez	América	Pachuca	4–2	April 27, 2013
(Argentina) Mariano Pavone	Cruz Azul	Monterrey	5–1	May 4, 2013

=== Final phase ===
==== Bracket ====
Quarterfinals
1	UANL	0	1	1
9	Monterrey	1	1	2
2	América	1	2	3
7	UNAM	0	1	1
3	Atlas	0	1	1
6	Santos Laguna	0	3	3
4	Morelia	2	1	3
5	Cruz Azul	4	0	4

Semifinals
2	América	2	2	4
9	Monterrey	2	1	3
5	Cruz Azul	3	2	5
6	Santos Laguna	0	1	1

Finals
2	América	0	2	2 (4)
5	Cruz Azul	1	1	2 (2)

- Away goals rule is applied in the play-off round.
- If the two teams are tied after both legs and away goal rule applied, the higher seeded team advances.
- Both finalist qualify to the 2013–14 CONCACAF Champions League Group Stage.

==== Quarter-finals ====
Team 1	Agg.	Team 2	1st leg	2nd leg
Monterrey	2–1	UANL	1–0	1–1
UNAM	1–3	América	0–1	1–2
Santos Laguna	3–1	Atlas	0–0	3–1
Cruz Azul	4–3	Morelia	4–2	0–1

==== Semi-finals ====
Team 1	Agg.	Team 2	1st leg	2nd leg
Monterrey	3–4	América	2–2	1–2
Santos Laguna	1–5	Cruz Azul	0–3	1–2

==== Finals ====
Team 1	Agg.	Team 2	1st leg	2nd leg
Cruz Azul	2–2 (2–4 p)	América	1–0	1–2 (a.e.t.)

23 May 2013
21:00

Cruz Azul	1–0	América
Giménez 19'	Report

Estadio Azul, Mexico City
Attendance: 30,203
Referee: Jorge Antonio Pérez (Veracruz)
26 May 2013
20:00

América	2–1 (a.e.t.)	Cruz Azul
Mosquera 89'; Muñoz 90+3'	Report	T. Gutiérrez 20'
Penalties
Jiménez (penalty scored); Benítez (penalty scored); Martínez (penalty scored); Layún (penalty scored)	4–2	(penalty missed) Orozco; (penalty missed) Castro; (penalty scored) Chávez; (penalty scored) Flores

Estadio Azteca, Mexico City
Attendance: 85,170
Referee: Paul Delgadillo (Jalisco)

2–2 on aggregate. América won 4–2 on penalty kicks.

== Relegation ==
Pos	Team	'10 A Pts	'11 C Pts	'11 A Pts	'12 C Pts	'12 A Pts	'13 C Pts	Total Pts	Total Pld	Avg	Relegation
1	Cruz Azul	39	26	29	25	26	29	174	102	1.7059	
2	UANL	24	35	28	31	21	35	174	102	1.7059	
3	Santos Laguna	30	23	27	36	23	29	168	102	1.6471	
4	Morelia	21	31	26	31	27	30	166	102	1.6275	
5	América	27	26	15	32	31	32	163	102	1.598	
6	Monterrey	32	26	24	32	23	23	160	102	1.5686	
7	UNAM	25	35	25	16	23	29	153	102	1.5	
8	Tijuana	0	0	18	28	34	21	101	68	1.4853	
9	León	0	0	0	0	33	16	49	34	1.4412	
10	Pachuca	25	18	26	28	21	20	138	102	1.3529	
11	Toluca	22	21	20	22	34	18	137	102	1.3431	
12	Guadalajara	22	25	30	15	23	16	131	102	1.2843	
13	Chiapas	25	14	26	27	22	17	131	102	1.2843	
14	San Luis	26	21	24	12	15	16	114	102	1.1176	
15	Atlas	13	23	12	20	12	32	112	102	1.098	
16	Atlante	16	27	19	16	20	13	111	102	1.0882	
17	Puebla	19	18	22	19	13	19	110	102	1.0784	
18	Querétaro	19	16	26	12	7	24	104	102	1.0196	Relegation

Updated to games played on May 5, 2013
Source: LigaMX.net – Estadística – Tabla General de Cociente
