= Clausura 2013 Liga MX final phase =

Clausura 2013 final phase Liga MX
Tournament details
- Country: Mexico
- Teams: 8

Tournament statistics
- Matches played: 14
- Goals scored: 35 (2.5 per match)
- Attendance: 564,909 (40,351 per match)

The Clausura 2013 Liga MX final phase commonly known as Liguilla (mini league) was played from 8 May 2013 and 26 May 2013. The winners and runners-up of the competition qualified for the 2013–14 CONCACAF Champions League.

== Bracket ==
Quarterfinals
1	UANL	0	1	1
9	Monterrey	1	1	2
2	América	1	2	3
7	UNAM	0	1	1
3	Atlas	0	1	1
6	Santos Laguna	0	3	3
4	Morelia	2	1	3
5	Cruz Azul	4	0	4

Semifinals
2	América	2	2	4
9	Monterrey	2	1	3
5	Cruz Azul	3	2	5
6	Santos Laguna	0	1	1

Finals
2	América	0	2	2 (4)
5	Cruz Azul	1	1	2 (2)

- Away goals rule is applied in the play-off round.
- If the two teams are tied after both legs and away goal rule applied, the higher seeded team advances.
- Both finalist qualify to the 2013–14 CONCACAF Champions League Group Stage.

== Quarter-finals ==
The first legs of the quarterfinals were played on May 8 and 9. The second legs were played on May 11 and 12.

Team 1	Agg.	Team 2	1st leg	2nd leg
Monterrey	2–1	UANL	1–0	1–1
UNAM	1–3	América	0–1	1–2
Santos Laguna	3–1	Atlas	0–0	3–1
Cruz Azul	4–3	Morelia	4–2	0–1

8 May 2013
19:00 CDT (UTC−6)

Monterrey	1–0	UANL
Suazo 19'	Report

Estadio Tecnológico, Monterrey
Attendance: 33,026
Referee: José Alfredo Peñaloza (Mexico City)
11 May 2013
19:00

UANL	1–1	Monterrey
Danilinho 13'	Report	Jiménez 34' (o.g.)

Estadio Universitario, Monterrey
Attendance: 40,435
Referee: Roberto García Orozco (Mexico City)

Monterrey won 2–1 on aggregate.

8 May 2013
21:00 CDT (UTC−6)

UNAM	0–1	América
	Report	Jiménez 29'

Estadio Olímpico Universitario, Mexico City
Attendance: 44,927
Referee: Fernando Guerrero (Mexico City)
11 May 2013
17:00

América	2–1	UNAM
Benítez 57', 90+4'	Report	Ramírez 22'

Estadio Azteca, Mexico City
Attendance: 49,132
Referee: Marco Antonio Rodríguez (Mexico City)

América won 3–1 on aggregate.

9 May 2013
19:00 CDT (UTC−6)

Santos Laguna	0–0	Atlas
	Report

Estadio Corona, Torreón
Attendance: 19,856
Referee: César Arturo Ramos (Sinaloa)
12 May 2013
20:00

Atlas	1–3	Santos Laguna
Bravo 5'	Report	Rentería 16'; Quintero 63', 90'

Estadio Jalisco, Guadalajara
Attendance: 43,250
Referee: Jorge Antonio Pérez (Veracruz)

Santos Laguna won 3–1 on aggregate.

9 May 2013
21:00 CDT (UTC−6)

Cruz Azul	4–2	Morelia
Pavone 24', 90+8'; T. Gutiérrez 53'; Giménez 59'	Report	Mancilla 2'; Ochoa 90+18'

Estadio Azul, Mexico City
Attendance: 25,550
Referee: Jorge Isaac Rojas (Mexico City)
12 May 2013
18:00

Morelia	1–0	Cruz Azul
Salinas 45'	Report

Estadio Morelos, Morelia
Attendance: 28,048
Referee: Paul Delgadillo (Jalisco)

Cruz Azul won 4–3 on aggregate.

== Semi-finals ==
The first legs of the semifinals were played on May 15 and May 16. The second legs were played on May 18 and 19.

Team 1	Agg.	Team 2	1st leg	2nd leg
Monterrey	3–4	América	2–2	1–2
Santos Laguna	1–5	Cruz Azul	0–3	1–2

15 May 2013
21:00

Monterrey	2–2	América
Suazo 29'; de Nigris 73'	Report	Benítez 51', 70'

Estadio Tecnológico, Monterrey
Attendance: 33,240
Referee: Jorge Pérez Durán (Veracruz)
18 May 2013
17:00

América	2–1	Monterrey
Jiménez 64' (pen.); Benítez 82'	Report	de Nigris 90+2'

Estadio Azteca, Mexico City
Attendance: 71,236
Referee: Paul Delgadillo (Jalisco)

América won 4–3 on aggregate.

16 May 2013
21:00

Santos Laguna	0–3	Cruz Azul
	Report	Flores 3'; Barrera 25'; Figueroa 88' (o.g.)

Estadio Corona, Torreón
Attendance: 28,957
Referee: César Arturo Ramos (Sinaloa)
19 May 2013
20:00

Cruz Azul	2–1	Santos Laguna
Orozco 8', 25'	Report	Rentería 37'

Estadio Azul, Mexico City
Attendance: 31,879
Referee: Marco Antonio Rodríguez (Mexico City)

Cruz Azul won 5–1 on aggregate.

== Final ==
Team 1	Agg.	Team 2	1st leg	2nd leg
Cruz Azul	2–2 (2–4 p)	América	1–0	1–2 (a.e.t.)

=== First leg ===
23 May 2013
21:00

Cruz Azul	1–0	América
Giménez 19'	Report

Estadio Azul, Mexico City
Attendance: 30,203
Referee: Jorge Antonio Pérez (Veracruz)

==== Details ====
Cruz Azul	América

GK	1	(Mexico) José de Jesús Corona
DF	15	(Mexico) Gerardo Flores
DF	14	(Colombia) Luis Amaranto Perea
DF	4	(Mexico) Julio César Domínguez
DF	16	(Mexico) Jair Pereira
MF	5	(Mexico) Alejandro Castro	(yellow card) 49'
MF	6	(Mexico) Gerardo Torrado (c)
MF	17	(Mexico) Pablo Barrera		(substituted off) 83'
MF	10	(Argentina) Christian Giménez	(yellow card) 43'
FW	27	(Mexico) Javier Orozco
FW	29	(Colombia) Teófilo Gutiérrez		(substituted off) 88'
Substitutions:
GK	25	(Mexico) Yosgart Gutiérrez
DF	3	(Mexico) Néstor Araujo
DF	28	(Mexico) Rogelio Chávez
MF	8	(Mexico) Israel Castro		(substituted on) 88'
MF	13	(Mexico) Allam Bello
FW	20	(Argentina) Mariano Pavone		(substituted on) 83'
FW	23	(Argentina) Nicolás Bertolo
Manager:
(Mexico) Guillermo Vázquez

GK	23	(Mexico) Moisés Muñoz
DF	16	(Mexico) Adrián Aldrete	(yellow card) 15'	(substituted off) 90+2'
DF	3	(Colombia) Aquivaldo Mosquera (c)	(yellow card) 61'
DF	2	(Mexico) Francisco Javier Rodríguez
DF	13	(Mexico) Diego Reyes
DF	19	(Mexico) Miguel Layún
MF	5	(Mexico) Jesús Molina
MF	26	(Mexico) Juan Carlos Medina		(substituted off) 88'
MF	14	(Argentina) Rubens Sambueza
FW	9	(Mexico) Raúl Jiménez
FW	11	(Ecuador) Christian Benitez
Substitutions:
GK	1	(Mexico) Hugo González
DF	4	(Mexico) Efraín Juárez
DF	6	(Mexico) Juan Carlos Valenzuela
MF	10	(Paraguay) Osvaldo Martínez
MF	18	(Mexico) Christian Bermúdez		(substituted on) 88'
FW	7	(Ecuador) Narciso Mina		(substituted on) 90+2'
FW	17	(Mexico) Antonio López
Manager:
(Mexico) Miguel Herrera

Assistant referees:
Héctor Manuel Delgadillo (Coahuila)
José Santana Martínez (Estado de México)
Fourth official:
José Alfredo Peñaloza (Mexico City)

=== Second leg ===
26 May 2013
20:00

América	2–1 (a.e.t.)	Cruz Azul
Mosquera 89'; Muñoz 90+3'	Report	T. Gutiérrez 20'
Penalties
Jiménez (penalty scored); Benítez (penalty scored); Martínez (penalty scored); Layún (penalty scored)	4–2	(penalty missed) Orozco; (penalty missed) Castro; (penalty scored) Chávez; (penalty scored) Flores

Estadio Azteca, Mexico City
Attendance: 85,170
Referee: Paul Delgadillo (Jalisco)

2–2 on aggregate. América won 4–2 on penalty kicks.

==== Details ====
América	Cruz Azul

GK	23	(Mexico) Moisés Muñoz
DF	16	(Mexico) Adrián Aldrete		(substituted off) 65'
DF	2	(Mexico) Francisco Javier Rodríguez
DF	13	(Mexico) Diego Reyes		(substituted off) 26'
DF	3	(Colombia) Aquivaldo Mosquera (c)
DF	22	(Mexico) Paul Aguilar	(yellow card) 63'
MF	5	(Mexico) Jesús Molina	(red card) 14'
MF	26	(Mexico) Juan Carlos Medina
MF	14	(Argentina) Rubens Sambueza	(yellow card) 53'	(substituted off) 76'
FW	9	(Mexico) Raúl Jiménez
FW	11	(Ecuador) Christian Benitez
Substitutions:
GK	1	(Mexico) Hugo González
DF	6	(Mexico) Juan Carlos Valenzuela
DF	19	(Mexico) Miguel Layún		(substituted on) 26'
MF	10	(Paraguay) Osvaldo Martínez		(substituted on) 76'
MF	18	(Mexico) Christian Bermúdez		(substituted on) 65'
FW	7	(Ecuador) Narciso Mina
FW	17	(Mexico) Antonio López
Manager:
(Mexico) Miguel Herrera

GK	1	(Mexico) José de Jesús Corona	(yellow card) 90'
DF	16	(Mexico) Jair Pereira	(yellow card) 119'
DF	14	(Colombia) Luis Amaranto Perea	(yellow card) 58'
DF	4	(Mexico) Julio César Domínguez
DF	15	(Mexico) Gerardo Flores
DF	5	(Mexico) Alejandro Castro	(yellow card) 4'
MF	6	(Mexico) Gerardo Torrado (c)
MF	8	(Mexico) Israel Castro	(yellow card) 18'	(substituted off) 25'
MF	10	(Argentina) Christian Giménez	(yellow card) 43'
MF	17	(Mexico) Pablo Barrera	(yellow card) 52'	(substituted off) 85'
FW	29	(Colombia) Teófilo Gutiérrez	(yellow card) 75'	(substituted off) 78'
Substitutions:
GK	25	(Mexico) Yosgart Gutiérrez
DF	3	(Mexico) Néstor Araujo
DF	28	(Mexico) Rogelio Chávez		(substituted on) 85'
MF	11	(Mexico) Alejandro Vela
FW	20	(Argentina) Mariano Pavone		(substituted on) 78'
FW	23	(Argentina) Nicolás Bertolo
FW	27	(Mexico) Javier Orozco		(substituted on) 25'
Manager:
(Mexico) Guillermo Vázquez

Assistant referees:
José Luis Camargo (Estado de México)
Alberto Morin Méndez (Chihuahua)
Fourth official:
César Arturo Ramos (Sinaloa)

== Statistics ==
=== Goalscorers ===
There were 35 goals scored in 14 matches, for an average of 2.5 goals per match.

5 goals

- (Ecuador) Christian Benítez (América)

2 goals

- (Mexico) Aldo de Nigris (Monterrey)
- (Argentina) Christian Giménez (Cruz Azul)
- (Colombia) Teófilo Gutiérrez (Cruz Azul)
- (Mexico) Raúl Jiménez (América)
- (Mexico) Javier Orozco (Cruz Azul)
- (Argentina) Mariano Pavone (Cruz Azul)
- (Colombia) Darwin Quintero (Santos Laguna)
- (Colombia) Andrés Rentería (Santos Laguna)
- (Chile) Humberto Suazo (Monterrey)

1 goal

- (Mexico) Pablo Barrera (Cruz Azul)
- (Mexico) Omar Bravo (Atlas)
- (Mexico) Gerardo Flores (Cruz Azul)
- (Chile) Héctor Mancilla (Morelia)
- (Colombia) Aquivaldo Mosquera (América)
- (Mexico) Moisés Muñoz (América)
- (Mexico) Carlos Ochoa (Morelia)
- (Paraguay) Robin Ramírez (UNAM)
- (Mexico) Rodrigo Salinas (Morelia)
- (Brazil) Danilinho (UANL)

1 own goal

- (Mexico) Rafael Figueroa (for Cruz Azul)
- (Mexico) Israel Jiménez (for Monterrey)

=== Assists ===
3 assists

- (Mexico) Pablo Barrera (Cruz Azul)

2 assists

- (Mexico) Javier Orozco (Cruz Azul)

1 assist

- (Mexico) Adrián Aldrete (América)
- (Panama) Felipe Baloy (Santos Laguna)
- (Ecuador) Christian Benítez (América)
- (Mexico) Christian Bermúdez (América)
- (Mexico) Alejandro Castro (Cruz Azul)
- (Mexico) Jehu Chiapas (UNAM)
- (Argentina) César Delgado (Monterrey)
- (Mexico) Julio César Domínguez (Cruz Azul)
- (Mexico) Gerardo Flores (Cruz Azul)
- (Argentina) Christian Giménez (Cruz Azul)
- (Mexico) Raúl Jiménez (América)
- (Mexico) Gerardo Flores (Cruz Azul)
- (Paraguay) Osvaldo Martínez (América)
- (Colombia) Aldo Ramírez (Morelia)
- (Colombia) Andrés Rentería (Santos Laguna)
- (Ecuador) Joao Rojas (Morelia)
- (Mexico) Carlos Salcido (UANL)
- (Mexico) Rodrigo Salinas (Morelia)
- (Argentina) Rubens Sambueza (América)
- (Chile) Humberto Suazo (Monterrey)
- (Mexico) Jesús Zavala (Monterrey)
