= 2018–19 Liga MX season =

72nd professional season of the top-flight football league in Mexico

Liga MX
- Season: 2018–19
- Champions: Apertura: América (13th title); Clausura: UANL (7th title)
- Relegated: Veracruz
- Champions League: América; Cruz Azul; UANL; León
- Matches: 306
- Goals: 834 (2.73 per match); Apertura: 408 (2.67 per match); Clausura: 426 (2.78 per match)
- Top goalscorer: Apertura: André-Pierre Gignac (14 goals); Clausura: Ángel Mena (14 goals)
- Biggest home win: Apertura: UANL 6–1 Puebla (10 November 2018); Clausura: Pachuca 9–2 Veracruz (13 April 2019)
- Biggest away win: Apertura: Veracruz 0–4 León (28 September 2018); León 0–4 Puebla (28 October 2018); Clausura: Querétaro 0–4 León (27 January 2019); BUAP 0–4 Puebla (31 March 2019)
- Highest scoring: Apertura: UNAM 5–3 Necaxa (29 July 2018); Pachuca 6–2 Necaxa (3 November 2018) Clausura: Pachuca 9–2 Veracruz (13 April 2019)
- Longest winning run: Apertura: 3 matches List: América (twice) Cruz Azul (twice) Guadalajara Monterrey Morelia Querétaro Santos Laguna Tijuana Toluca UANL UNAM; Clausura: 12 matches León
- Longest unbeaten run: Apertura: 11 matches América; Clausura: 12 matches León
- Longest winless run: Apertura: 10 matches Atlas; Necaxa; Clausura: 17 matches Veracruz
- Longest losing run: Apertura: 6 matches Atlas; Clausura: 7 matches Querétaro; Veracruz
- Highest attendance: Apertura: 69,486; América vs Guadalajara (30 September 2018); Clausura: 51,027; Monterrey vs UANL (9 March 2019)
- Lowest attendance: Apertura: 5,845; BUAP vs Veracruz (29 July 2018); Clausura: 6,350; BUAP vs Santos Laguna (6 January 2019)
- Total attendance: Apertura: 3,503,135; Clausura: 3,470,006
- Average attendance: Apertura: 22,896; Clausura: 22,680
- Stats are from the regular season only Source: Liga MX (Apertura); Liga MX (Clausura)

The 2018–19 Liga MX season (known as the Liga BBVA Bancomer MX for sponsorship reasons) was the 72nd professional season of the top-flight football league in Mexico. The season was split into two championships—the Torneo Apertura and the Torneo Clausura—each in an identical format and each contested by the same eighteen teams.

== Clubs ==
The following eighteen teams competed this season. Lobos BUAP was initially relegated to the Ascenso MX after accumulating the lowest point coefficient last season, but instead they will continue to compete in the Liga MX after the 2017–18 Ascenso MX champion, Cafetaleros de Tapachula, who won promotion after defeating Alebrijes de Oaxaca, was not certified to be promoted. Lobos BUAP paid MXN$120 million to be disbursed to Cafetaleros de Tapachula and remain in Liga MX.

=== Stadiums and locations ===
América & Cruz Azul	Atlas	BUAP	Guadalajara	León	Monterrey
Estadio Azteca	Estadio Jalisco	Estadio Universitario BUAP	Estadio Akron	Estadio León	Estadio BBVA Bancomer
Capacity: 87,000	Capacity: 55,110	Capacity: 19,283	Capacity: 45,364	Capacity: 31,297	Capacity: 53,500
	Barra 51				
Morelia	Necaxa	Pachuca	Puebla	Querétaro	Santos Laguna
Estadio Morelos	Estadio Victoria	Estadio Hidalgo	Estadio Cuauhtémoc	Estadio Corregidora	Estadio Corona
Capacity: 34,795	Capacity: 23,851	Capacity: 27,512	Capacity: 51,726	Capacity: 33,162	Capacity: 29,237
Tijuana	Toluca	UANL	UNAM	Veracruz	
Estadio Caliente	Estadio Nemesio Díez	Estadio Universitario	Estadio Olímpico Universitario	Estadio Luis "Pirata" Fuente	
Capacity: 27,333	Capacity: 31,000	Capacity: 41,886	Capacity: 48,297	Capacity: 28,703	

Location of the 2018–19 Liga MX teams

=== Personnel and kits ===
Team	Chairman	Head coach	Captain	Kit manufacturer	Shirt sponsor(s)
América	Santiago Baños	(Mexico) Miguel Herrera	(Mexico) Oribe Peralta	Nike	AT&T
Atlas	Gustavo Guzmán	(Argentina) Leandro Cufré	(Mexico) Juan Pablo Vigón	Adidas	Linio
BUAP	Juan Carlos Bozikián	(Mexico) Francisco Palencia	(Mexico) Francisco Javier Rodríguez	Pirma	Vía San Ángel
Cruz Azul	Guillermo Álvarez Cuevas	(Portugal) Pedro Caixinha	(Mexico) José de Jesús Corona	Under Armour (Note: Apertura 2018) / Joma (Note: Clausura 2019)	Cemento Cruz Azul
Guadalajara	Jorge Vergara	(Mexico) Tomás Boy	(Mexico) Jair Pereira	Puma	None
León	Jesús Martínez Murguia	(Mexico) Ignacio Ambriz	(Argentina) Mauro Boselli	Pirma	Cementos Fortaleza
Monterrey	Duilio Davino	(Uruguay) Diego Alonso	(Argentina) José María Basanta	Puma	AT&T
Morelia	Álvaro Dávila	(Argentina) Javier Torrente	(Ecuador) Gabriel Achilier	Pirma	Caliente
Necaxa	Ernesto Tinajero Flores	(Mexico) Guillermo Vázquez	(United States) Ventura Alvarado	Charly	Rolcar
Pachuca	Jesús Martínez Patiño	(Argentina) Martín Palermo	(Mexico) Jorge Hernández	Charly	Cementos Fortaleza
Puebla	Manuel Jiménez García	(Mexico) José Luis Sánchez Solá	(Mexico) José Daniel Guerrero	Li-Ning	AT&T
Querétaro	Jaime Ordiales	(Mexico) Víctor Manuel Vucetich	(Argentina) Miguel Martínez	Puma	Banco Multiva
Santos Laguna	Alejandro Irarragorri	(Uruguay) Guillermo Almada	(Mexico) José Abella	Charly	Soriana
Tijuana	Jorge Hank Inzunsa	(Colombia) Óscar Pareja	(Mexico) Juan Carlos Valenzuela	Charly	Caliente
Toluca	Francisco Suinaga	(Argentina) Ricardo La Volpe	(Mexico) Antonio Ríos	Under Armour	Citibanamex
Tigres	Miguel Ángel Garza	(Brazil) Ricardo Ferretti	(Brazil) Juninho	Adidas	Cemex
UNAM	Rodrigo Ares de Parga	(Argentina) Bruno Marioni	(Mexico) Pablo Barrera	Nike	DHL
Veracruz	Fidel Kuri Mustieles	(Uruguay) Robert Siboldi	(Peru) Pedro Gallese	Charly	Winpot Casino

=== Managerial changes ===
Team	Outgoing manager	Manner of departure	Date of vacancy	Replaced by	Date of appointment	Position in table	Ref.
Pre-Apertura changes
Pachuca	(Uruguay) Diego Alonso	End of contract	May 4, 2018	(Spain) Pako Ayestarán	June 11, 2018	Preseason	
Querétaro	(Mexico) Luis Fernando Tena	Mutual agreement	May 6, 2018	(Mexico) Rafael Puente Jr.	May 7, 2018	Preseason	
Monterrey	(Argentina) Antonio Mohamed	Mutual agreement	May 7, 2018	(Uruguay) Diego Alonso	May 18, 2018	Preseason	
Necaxa	(Mexico) Ignacio Ambríz	Mutual agreement	May 8, 2018	(Mexico) Marcelo Michel Leaño	May 11, 2018	Preseason	
Lobos BUAP	(Mexico) Daniel Alcántar (interim)	End of tenure as caretaker	May 31, 2018	(Mexico) Francisco Palencia	June 1, 2018	Preseason	
Guadalajara	(Argentina) Matías Almeyda	Resigned	June 11, 2018	(Paraguay) José Cardozo	June 12, 2018	Preseason	
Apertura changes
Santos Laguna	(Uruguay) Robert Siboldi	Resigned	August 8, 2018	(Mexico) Salvador Reyes	August 8, 2018	6th	
Veracruz	(Mexico) Guillermo Vázquez	Resigned	August 14, 2018	(Mexico) Hugo Chávez (interim)	August 14, 2018	13th	
Veracruz	(Mexico) Hugo Chávez (interim)	End of tenure as caretaker	(Note: Although appointed on 15 August 2018, Olmos would not immediately take charge. Due to paperwork, his first match was delayed to 25 August 2018 vs Tijuana.)	(Chile) Juvenal Olmos	August 15, 2018	13th	
Atlas	(Mexico) Gerardo Espinoza	Sacked	September 3, 2018	(Argentina) Ángel Guillermo Hoyos	September 11, 2018	18th	
León	(Uruguay) Gustavo Díaz	Sacked	September 17, 2018	(Mexico) Ignacio Ambriz	September 18, 2018	15th	
Necaxa	(Mexico) Marcelo Michel Leaño	Sacked	October 21, 2018	(Mexico) Jorge Martínez Merino (interim)	October 23, 2018	15th	
Veracruz	(Chile) Juvenal Olmos	Sacked	October 27, 2018	(Mexico) Hugo Chávez (interim)	October 27, 2018	18th	
Tijuana	(Argentina) Diego Cocca	Mutual agreement	October 30, 2018	(Colombia) Frankie Oviedo (interim)	October 31, 2018	14th	
Pre-Clausura changes
Tijuana	(Colombia) Frankie Oviedo (interim)	End of tenure as caretaker	November 27, 2018	(Colombia) Óscar Pareja	November 27, 2018	Preseason	
Necaxa	(Mexico) Jorge Martínez Merino (interim)	End of tenure as caretaker	November 29, 2018	(Mexico) Guillermo Vázquez	November 29, 2018	Preseason	
Veracruz	(Mexico) Hugo Chávez (interim)	End of tenure as caretaker	December 5, 2018	(Uruguay) Robert Siboldi	December 5, 2018	Preseason	
Clausura changes
Pachuca	(Spain) Pako Ayestarán	Sacked	January 19, 2019	(Argentina) Martín Palermo	January 21, 2019	12th	
UNAM	(Mexico) David Patiño	Sacked	January 27, 2019	(Argentina) Bruno Marioni	January 27, 2019	16th	
Puebla	(Mexico) Enrique Meza	Sacked	February 3, 2019	(Mexico) José Luis Sánchez Solá	February 6, 2019	14th	
Querétaro	(Mexico) Rafael Puente Jr.	Sacked	February 17, 2019	(Mexico) Víctor Manuel Vucetich	February 18, 2019	18th	
Morelia	(Mexico) Roberto Hernández	Sacked	February 24, 2019	(Mexico) Gastón Obledo (interim)	February 24, 2019	16th	
Toluca	(Argentina) Hernán Cristante	Sacked	February 25, 2019	(Mexico) José Luis Real (interim)	February 25, 2019	15th	
Morelia	(Mexico) Gastón Obledo (interim)	End of tenure as caretaker	(Note: Although appointed on 28 February 2019, Torrente would not immediately take charge. Due to the match calendar, his first match was delayed to 10 March 2019 vs UNAM.)	(Argentina) Javier Torrente	February 28, 2019	16th	
Toluca	(Mexico) José Luis Real (interim)	End of tenure as caretaker	March 4, 2019	(Argentina) Ricardo La Volpe	March 4, 2019	14th	
Atlas	(Argentina) Guillermo Hoyos	Sacked	March 9, 2019	(Argentina) Leandro Cufré	March 11, 2019	15th	
Guadalajara	(Paraguay) José Cardozo	Sacked	March 31, 2019	(Mexico) Alberto Coyote (interim)	April 1, 2019	11th	
Santos Laguna	(Mexico) Salvador Reyes	Sacked	April 4, 2019	(Mexico) Rubén Duarte (interim)	April 4, 2019	12th	
Guadalajara	(Mexico) Alberto Coyote (interim)	End of tenure as caretaker	April 9, 2019	(Mexico) Tomás Boy	April 9, 2019	14th	
Santos Laguna	(Mexico) Rubén Duarte (interim)	End of tenure as caretaker	April 11, 2019	(Uruguay) Guillermo Almada	April 11, 2019	12th	
Veracruz	(Uruguay) Robert Siboldi	Resigned	April 15, 2019	(Mexico) José Luis González China	April 15, 2019	18th	

== Torneo Apertura ==
The Apertura 2018 was the first championship of the season. The regular season began on 20 July 2018 and ended on 25 November 2018. The defending champions were Santos Laguna, having won their sixth title.

=== Regular phase ===
==== League table ====
Pos	Team	Pld	W	D	L	GF	GA	GD	Pts	Qualification or relegation
1	Cruz Azul	17	11	3	3	26	13	+13	36	Advance to Liguilla (Note: The first 8 places in the table qualified for the Liguilla. The last ranked team in the relegation table could qualify for the Liguilla in the Apertura tournament.)
2	América (C)	17	9	6	2	33	17	+16	33	Advance to Liguilla
3	Pumas	17	8	6	3	29	19	+10	30	Advance to Liguilla
4	Santos Laguna	17	8	6	3	27	18	+9	30	Advance to Liguilla
5	Monterrey	17	9	3	5	25	19	+6	30	Advance to Liguilla
6	Tigres	17	8	5	4	32	18	+14	29	Advance to Liguilla
7	Toluca	17	8	2	7	27	22	+5	26	Advance to Liguilla
8	Querétaro	17	7	5	5	19	20	−1	26	Advance to Liguilla
9	Morelia	17	7	4	6	23	26	−3	25	
10	Pachuca	17	6	6	5	26	18	+8	24	
11	Guadalajara	17	5	5	7	21	22	−1	20	
12	Puebla	17	5	5	7	23	30	−7	20	
13	BUAP	17	5	4	8	21	25	−4	19	
14	León	17	5	3	9	18	23	−5	18	
15	Tijuana	17	4	5	8	13	24	−11	17	
16	Necaxa	17	3	5	9	19	29	−10	14	
17	Atlas	17	2	5	10	11	27	−16	11	
18	Veracruz	17	2	4	11	17	40	−23	10	Team is last in Relegation table

Source: Liga MX
Rules for classification: 1) Points; 2) Goal difference; 3) Number of goals scored; 4) Head-to-head results between tied teams; 5) Number of goals scored away; 6) Highest relegation coefficient; 7) Fair Play points
(C) Champions

==== Positions by round ====
The table lists the positions of teams after each week of matches. In order to preserve chronological evolvements, any postponed matches were not included in the round at which they were originally scheduled, but added to the full round they were played immediately afterwards. For example, if a match was scheduled for matchday 13, but then postponed and played between days 16 and 17, it was added to the standings for day 16.

Team ╲ Round	1	2	3	4	5	6	7	8	9	10	11	12	13	14	15	16	17
Cruz Azul	1	2	2	2	1	1	1	1	1	1	1	1	2	3	1	1	1
América	11	6	4	3	4	5	5	3	3	2	2	2	1	1	2	2	2
UNAM	2	1	1	1	5	6	6	4	2	4	5	4	4	4	4	3	3
Santos Laguna	7	12	6	4	2	3	3	5	4	5	3	3	3	2	3	4	4
Monterrey	8	3	3	5	3	2	2	2	6	6	4	6	5	6	6	5	5
UANL	4	4	5	8	9	8	9	7	7	7	7	7	7	8	7	6	6
Toluca	3	7	8	6	6	7	8	8	5	3	6	5	6	5	5	7	7
Querétaro	9	5	11	14	11	9	7	6	8	8	10	8	8	10	10	10	8
Morelia	15	9	9	7	7	4	4	9	12	11	14	9	9	7	9	8	9
Pachuca	14	16	18	18	13	15	12	10	11	13	8	11	10	9	8	9	10
Guadalajara	12	15	14	17	12	10	10	12	9	10	9	12	11	12	12	11	11
Puebla	18	13	13	15	16	13	14	13	10	12	12	13	14	11	11	12	12
BUAP	13	8	12	12	15	16	17	17	17	17	16	16	16	16	14	14	13
León	16	17	16	11	14	11	11	11	14	15	13	14	12	13	13	13	14
Tijuana	5	10	10	10	10	14	16	14	13	9	11	10	13	14	15	15	15
Necaxa	6	11	7	9	8	12	13	15	14	14	15	15	15	15	16	16	16
Atlas	10	14	17	16	18	18	18	18	18	18	18	18	18	17	17	17	17
Veracruz	17	18	15	13	17	17	15	16	16	16	17	17	17	18	18	18	18

Leader and qualification to playoffs
Qualification to playoffs
Last place in table

Source: Liga MX

=== Results ===
Home \ Away	AMÉ	ATL	BUP	CAZ	GUA	LEÓ	MON	MOR	NEC	PAC	PUE	QUE	SLA	TIJ	TOL	UNL	UNM	VER
América		3–0			1–1		3–0	2–1						3–0	1–1		2–2	4–1
Atlas					0–1	0–0		0–1		0–0		0–0		0–1	2–0		0–3	4–3
BUAP	0–2	0–0			1–1		1–2	3–1						3–1	2–0			2–0
Cruz Azul	0–0	2–0	2–1			3–0	2–1				3–0				1–0	1–0		4–1
Guadalajara				0–1				1–2	1–0	1–3		1–1	1–2			0–1	1–2	
León	2–0		0–1		0–1		0–2	1–2			0–4	4–0					1–2	
Monterrey		3–1			2–4			2–2				2–1		3–0	2–1		1–0	2–0
Morelia				0–2					2–1	1–1	2–0	1–4	3–1			0–2	0–0	
Necaxa	2–1	2–2	1–0	2–0		0–2	1–1				2–2		0–1			1–1		
Pachuca	1–3		3–0	3–1		1–1	0–1		6–2		2–0		1–1			1–1		
Puebla	2–3	2–0	2–2		2–2		2–1							0–0	2–1			1–2
Querétaro	1–1		2–0	2–0					1–0	1–0	0–1		2–1			0–2		
Santos Laguna	1–1	3–1	2–1	1–1		3–0	1–0				2–0					3–1		1–1
Tijuana				1–1	2–1	1–1		2–3	1–0	1–0		1–1	2–2				0–1	
Toluca					2–2	1–2		2–0	3–2	2–1			2–1	3–0			0–1	
UANL	2–3	3–1	2–2			2–0	0–0				6–1			1–0	2–1			4–0
UNAM			4–2	1–2					5–3	0–0	2–2	0–1	1–1			3–3		
Veracruz					0–2	0–4		2–2	0–0	2–3		2–2		1–0	2–3		0–2	

Source: Liga MX
Legend: Blue = home team win; Yellow = draw; Red = away team win.

=== Top goalscorers ===
Players sorted first by goals scored, then by last name.

Rank	Player	Club	Goals
1	(France) André-Pierre Gignac	UANL	14
2	(Argentina) Julio Furch	Santos Laguna	12
3	(Mexico) Víctor Guzmán	Pachuca	9
3	(Argentina) Franco Jara	Pachuca	9
3	(Uruguay) Jonathan Rodríguez	Santos Laguna	9
6	(Argentina) Leonardo Ramos	BUAP	8
6	(Brazil) Camilo Sanvezzo	Querétaro	8
8	(Paraguay) Carlos González	UNAM	7
8	(Chile) Felipe Mora	UNAM	7
10	(Argentina) Mauro Boselli	León	6
10	(Canada) Lucas Cavallini	Puebla	6
10	(Chile) Víctor Dávila	Necaxa	6
10	(Argentina) Cristian Menéndez	Veracruz	6
10	(Argentina) Nicolás Sánchez	Monterrey	6
10	(Chile) Eduardo Vargas	UANL	6
10	(Mexico) Ángel Zaldívar	Guadalajara	6

Source: Liga MX

==== Hat-tricks ====
Player	For	Against	Result	Date
(Paraguay) Carlos González	UNAM	UANL	3–3	21 October 2018
(Mexico) Víctor Guzmán^{4}	Pachuca	Necaxa	6–2	3 November 2018
(France) André-Pierre Gignac^{4}	UANL	Puebla	6–1	10 November 2018

^{4} Player scored four goals

=== Attendance ===
Pos	Team	Total	High	Low	Average	Change
1	UANL	368,957	41,615	38,141	40,995	−0.9%
2	Cruz Azul	323,992	62,003	18,541	35,999	+96.8%^{1}
3	Monterrey	282,778	42,288	28,482	35,347	−17.5%
4	América	245,208	69,486	13,005	30,651	+11.8%^{2}
5	Tijuana	238,197	27,333	25,333	26,466	−0.6%
6	Guadalajara	202,924	37,412	18,210	25,366	−20.9%
7	UNAM	196,272	42,717	10,420	24,534	−19.3%
8	Atlas	214,171	40,207	14,216	23,797	−22.5%
9	Santos Laguna	214,094	28,479	20,854	23,788	+1.5%
10	Pachuca	195,177	27,512	15,976	21,686	−9.9%
11	Morelia	159,801	28,076	14,584	19,975	−7.0%
12	Querétaro	155,753	29,348	12,594	19,469	−14.0%
13	Toluca	164,063	30,000	15,308	18,229	−22.9%
14	León	139,131	25,175	12,356	17,391	+2.5%
15	Puebla	111,701	23,234	6,628	13,963	−29.1%
16	Necaxa	122,188	22,578	8,389	13,576	−31.1%
17	Veracruz	93,113	16,981	7,523	10,346	−51.2%
18	BUAP	75,615	18,619	5,845	9,452	−28.8%
	League total	3,503,135	69,486	5,845	22,896	−9.7%

Source: Liga MX
Notes:
Only regular season listed
1: Played in Estadio Azul last season.
2: Played one match at Estadio Nemesio Díez .

==== Highest and lowest ====
Highest attendance					Lowest attendance			
Week	Home	Score	Away	Attendance	Home	Score	Away	Attendance
1	Cruz Azul	3–0	Puebla	45,385	Necaxa	2–1	América	16,450
2	UANL	1–0	Tijuana	41,052	BUAP	2–0	Veracruz	5,845
3	Cruz Azul	1–0	UANL	55,571	Veracruz	2–2	Morelia	7,523
4	UANL	1–2	Toluca	41,379	BUAP	0–0	Atlas	7,346
5	Monterrey	1–0	UNAM	40,268	Necaxa	2–2	Puebla	8,389
6 (Note: Round scheduled for midweek.)	UANL	4–0	Veracruz	40,874	BUAP	1–2	Monterrey	7,836
7	Monterrey	2–2	Morelia	40,129	Veracruz	1–0	Tijuana	7,693
8	UANL	3–1	Atlas	41,363	Puebla	2–1	Monterrey	9,550
9	Monterrey	2–4	Guadalajara	37,812	Veracruz	2–3	Toluca	8,897
10	UANL	0–0	Monterrey	41,615	Toluca	3–2	Necaxa	15,705
11	América	1–1	Guadalajara	69,486	Veracruz	0–4	León	7,711
12	UANL	2–3	América	41,596	Veracruz	0–0	Necaxa	7,589
13	Monterrey	2–1	Toluca	29,444	Necaxa	0–2	León	10,049
14	Cruz Azul	0–0	América	62,003	Veracruz	2–3	Pachuca	8,684
15	UNAM	1–2	Cruz Azul	42,717	BUAP	3–1	Tijuana	6,223
16	UANL	6–1	Puebla	38,141	Necaxa	1–1	Monterrey	11,534
17	Monterrey	3–1	Atlas	31,758	Puebla	0–0	Tijuana	6,628

Source: Liga MX

=== Final phase ===
==== Bracket ====
Quarter-finals
1	Cruz Azul	2	1	3
8	Querétaro	0	1	1
4	Santos Laguna	0	0	0
5	Monterrey	1	2	3
2	América	2	3	5
7	Toluca	2	2	4
3	UNAM	1	3	4
6	UANL	2	1	3

Semi-finals
1	Cruz Azul (s)	0	1	1
5	Monterrey	1	0	1
2	América	1	6	7
3	Pumas	1	1	2

Finals
1	Cruz Azul	0	0	0
2	América	0	2	2

- Teams were re-seeded each round.
- Team with more goals on aggregate after two matches advanced.
- Away goals rule was applied in the quarter-finals and semi-finals, but not the final.
- In the quarter-finals and semi-finals, if the two teams were tied on aggregate and away goals, the higher seeded team advanced.
- In the final, if the two teams were tied after both legs, the match went to extra time and, if necessary, a shoot-out.
- Both finalists qualified to the 2020 CONCACAF Champions League (champions as MEX1, runners-up as MEX3).

==== Quarter-finals ====
Team 1	Agg.	Team 2	1st leg	2nd leg
Querétaro	1–3	Cruz Azul	0–2	1–1
Toluca	4–5	América	2–2	2–3
UANL	3–4	Pumas	2–1	1–3
Monterrey	3–0	Santos Laguna	1–0	2–0

==== Semi-finals ====
Team 1	Agg.	Team 2	1st leg	2nd leg
Monterrey	1–1 (s)	Cruz Azul	1–0	0–1
Pumas	2–7	América	1–1	1–6

==== Finals ====
Team 1	Agg.	Team 2	1st leg	2nd leg
América	2–0	Cruz Azul	0–0	2–0

== Torneo Clausura ==
The Clausura 2019 was the second championship of the season. The tournament began on 4 January 2019 ended on 26 May 2019. América were the defending champions, having won their record-breaking 13th league title the previous tournament.

=== Regular phase ===
==== League table ====
Pos	Team	Pld	W	D	L	GF	GA	GD	Pts	Qualification or relegation
1	León	17	13	2	2	41	14	+27	41	Advance to Liguilla (Note: The first 8 places in the table qualified for the Liguilla.)
2	Tigres UANL (C)	17	11	4	2	33	16	+17	37	Advance to Liguilla
3	Monterrey	17	8	6	3	33	21	+12	30	Advance to Liguilla
4	Cruz Azul	17	8	6	3	26	15	+11	30	Advance to Liguilla
5	América	17	9	2	6	28	19	+9	29	Advance to Liguilla
6	Necaxa	17	8	5	4	32	24	+8	29	Advance to Liguilla
7	Pachuca	17	8	4	5	32	26	+6	28	Advance to Liguilla
8	Tijuana	17	9	1	7	25	20	+5	28	Advance to Liguilla
9	Toluca	17	7	4	6	28	23	+5	25	
10	Puebla	17	6	6	5	18	21	−3	24	
11	Santos Laguna	17	6	4	7	21	23	−2	22	
12	BUAP	17	6	2	9	17	34	−17	20	
13	Atlas	17	6	1	10	19	28	−9	19	
14	Guadalajara	17	5	3	9	16	21	−5	18	
15	Pumas UNAM	17	4	5	8	19	26	−7	17	
16	Morelia	17	2	7	8	20	31	−11	13	
17	Querétaro	17	3	2	12	11	30	−19	11	
18	Veracruz (Note: Veracruz were docked 6 points, at the request of FIFA, over a failure to pay training compensation fees to Uruguayan club Montevideo Wanderers for Matías Santos.) (R)	17	0	4	13	7	34	−27	−2	Relegated to Ascenso MX (Note: Relegated teams were ineligible for the Liguilla, regardless of their place in the table.)

Source: Liga MX
Rules for classification: 1) Points; 2) Goal difference; 3) Number of goals scored; 4) Head-to-head results between tied teams; 5) Number of goals scored away; 6) Highest relegation coefficient; 7) Fair Play points
(C) Champions; (R) Relegated

==== Positions by round ====
The table lists the positions of teams after each week of matches. In order to preserve chronological evolvements, any postponed matches were not included in the round at which they were originally scheduled, but added to the full round they were played immediately afterwards. For example, if a match was scheduled for matchday 13, but then postponed and played between days 16 and 17, it was added to the standings for day 16.

Team ╲ Round	1	2	3	4	5	6	7	8	9	10	11	12	13	14	15	16	17
León	7	11	14	12	7	3	3	3	3	1	1	1	1	1	1	1	1
UANL	6	5	7	3	3	2	2	1	1	2	2	2	2	2	2	2	2
Monterrey	1	4	2	1	1	1	1	2	2	3	3	3	3	3	3	3	3
Cruz Azul	8	12	9	6	10	10	14	14	12	10	7	7	5	7	4	4	4
América	12	6	3	8	6	8	11	8	9	5	4	4	4	6	7	7	5
Necaxa	13	7	5	5	2	4	5	9	5	7	6	5	7	4	5	6	6
Pachuca	18	10	13	11	11	7	7	6	8	4	8	6	8	5	6	5	7
Tijuana	16	18	12	15	13	13	8	7	4	6	5	9	6	8	9	8	8
Toluca	2	1	4	9	12	12	15	15	14	13	12	12	10	10	10	10	9
Puebla	9	14	16	13	14	9	13	11	10	11	9	8	9	9	8	9	10
Santos Laguna	17	9	10	7	9	9	6	5	7	9	10	10	12	13	12	12	11
BUAP	4	3	6	10	8	14	10	12	11	12	13	13	11	11	11	11	12
Atlas	5	8	8	4	4	6	9	10	13	15	15	15	13	14	14	15	13
Guadalajara	3	2	1	2	5	5	4	4	6	8	11	11	14	15	15	13	14
UNAM	11	13	15	16	16	15	12	13	15	14	14	14	15	12	13	14	15
Morelia	15	16	11	14	15	16	16	16	16	16	16	16	16	16	16	16	16
Querétaro	14	17	18	18	18	18	18	18	18	18	18	17	17	17	17	17	17
Veracruz	10	14	17	17	17	17	17	17	17	17	17	18	18	18	18	18	18

Leader and qualification to playoffs
Qualification to playoffs
Last place in table

Source: Liga MX

=== Results ===
Home \ Away	AMÉ	ATL	BUP	CAZ	GUA	LEÓ	MON	MOR	NEC	PAC	PUE	QUE	SLA	TIJ	TOL	UNL	UNM	VER
América			3–0	0–0		0–3			1–3	3–0	1–0	2–0	1–0			3–0		
Atlas	1–2		3–1	0–2			2–0		1–2		1–2		1–0			0–1		
BUAP				1–4		0–1			2–3	1–1	0–4	3–1	2–0			0–3	2–1	
Cruz Azul					0–1			1–1	2–1	4–1		3–0	1–2	1–0				
Guadalajara	0–2	3–0	0–1			2–1	0–2							2–0	1–0			0–0
León				2–0					2–1	2–1			3–0	0–1	3–0	2–2		2–0
Monterrey	3–2		4–0	2–2		2–2			2–2	5–0	0–0		4–0			1–1		
Morelia	2–2	1–2	1–1		1–0	2–3	2–3							1–4	1–3			2–0
Necaxa					3–3			0–0				1–0		1–2	1–1		2–1	2–0
Pachuca	1–0				3–1			2–0				3–0		4–0	3–2		1–0	9–2
Puebla				1–1		0–3		1–1	1–4	1–1		1–0	1–1			1–1	1–0	
Querétaro		1–2			0–0	0–4	1–2	3–0						1–0	0–0		0–2	2–1
Santos Laguna					1–0			1–0	1–2	0–0		2–1		1–1	4–0			
Tijuana	3–2	3–1	1–2				1–0				4–0				2–0	0–3		3–0
Toluca	3–2	2–0	4–0	1–1			5–1				2–0					0–1		3–1
UANL				0–1	2–1				3–2	3–0		4–1	2–1				2–0	
UNAM	1–0	2–2			2–1	1–3	1–1	2–2					5–2	1–0	2–2			0–0
Veracruz	0–2	0–1	0–1	1–1			0–1				0–1		2–2			0–2		

Source: Liga MX
Legend: Blue = home team win; Yellow = draw; Red = away team win.

==== Top goalscorers ====
Players sorted first by goals scored, then by last name.

Rank	Player	Club	Goals
1	(Ecuador) Ángel Mena	León	14
2	(Argentina) Brian Fernández	Necaxa	12
3	(Argentina) Milton Caraglio	Cruz Azul	11
3	(Argentina) Rogelio Funes Mori	Monterrey	11
5	(Argentina) Gustavo Bou	Tijuana	8
5	(Mexico) José Juan Macías	León	8
5	(Argentina) Leonardo Ramos	BUAP	8
8	(Ecuador) Miller Bolaños	Tijuana	7
8	(France) André-Pierre Gignac	UANL	7
8	(Argentina) Franco Jara	Pachuca	7

Source: Liga MX

==== Hat-tricks ====
Player	For	Against	Result	Date
(Argentina) Enrique Triverio	Toluca	Morelia	3–1	4 January 2019
(Mexico) Alexis Vega	Guadalajara	Atlas	3–0	16 February 2019
(Argentina) Leonardo Ulloa	Pachuca	Veracruz	9–2	13 April 2019
(Argentina) Rogelio Funes Mori	Monterrey	Santos Laguna	4–0	14 April 2019

=== Attendance ===
==== Per team ====
Pos	Team	Total	High	Low	Average	Change
1	Monterrey	382,543	51,027	38,371	42,505	+20.3%
2	UANL	330,287	41,615	40,136	41,286	+0.7%
3	Guadalajara	272,650	41,075	23,557	30,294	+19.4%
4	Atlas	219,243	46,056	19,901	27,405	+15.2%
5	América	229,694	47,407	14,241	25,522	−16.7%
6	Tijuana	189,460	27,333	10,329	23,683	−10.5%
7	Santos Laguna	180,901	27,919	18,778	22,613	−4.9%
8	León	197,490	25,731	17,653	21,943	+26.2%
9	UNAM	194,769	42,600	12,763	21,641	−11.8%
10	Pachuca	165,445	27,293	17,303	20,681	−4.6%
11	Morelia	185,459	30,125	15,021	20,607	+3.2%
12	Puebla	174,065	25,127	12,129	19,341	+38.5%
13	Cruz Azul	143,105	32,881	10,311	17,888	−50.3%
14	Toluca	142,643	25,744	12,242	17,830	−2.2%
15	Necaxa	131,263	24,296	13,923	16,408	+20.9%
16	Querétaro	138,371	26,562	9,655	15,375	−21.0%
17	Veracruz	111,829	26,550	7,744	13,979	+35.1%
18	BUAP	80,789	14,275	6,350	8,977	−5.0%
	League total	3,470,006	51,027	6,350	22,680	−0.9%

Source: Liga MX
Notes:
Only regular season listed

==== Highest and lowest ====
Highest attendance					Lowest attendance			
Week	Home	Score	Away	Attendance	Home	Score	Away	Attendance
1	Monterrey	5–0	Pachuca	39,853	BUAP	2–0	Santos Laguna	6,350
2	Atlas	1–2	América	46,056	Veracruz	0–1	BUAP	10,712
3	UANL	0–1	Cruz Azul	41,615	BUAP	2–3	Necaxa	8,316
4	Monterrey	3–2	América	46,292	Cruz Azul	1–0	Tijuana	10,311
5	UANL	2–1	Santos Laguna	41,431	BUAP	1–1	Pachuca	6,850
6	Monterrey	4–0	BUAP	39,364	Veracruz	0–2	UANL	13,128
7	UNAM	1–0	América	42,600	BUAP	3–1	Querétaro	6,410
8	Monterrey	0–0	Puebla	43,219	Querétaro	3–0	Morelia	12,709
9	UANL	3–0	Pachuca	41,605	BUAP	2–1	UNAM	9,753
10	Monterrey	1–1	UANL	51,027	BUAP	0–1	León	7,148
11	UANL	4–1	Querétaro	41,137	Morelia	1–1	BUAP	15,021
12	Monterrey	2–2	Cruz Azul	41,771	Querétaro	1–0	Tijuana	9,655
13	UANL	2–0	UNAM	41,527	Veracruz	0–1	Atlas	7,744
14	América	0–0	Cruz Azul	47,407	BUAP	0–3	UANL	11,943
15	UANL	3–3	Morelia	40,136	Veracruz	0–1	Monterrey	15,400
16	Monterrey	2–2	Necaxa	38,371	BUAP	1–4	Cruz Azul	14,275
17	UANL	2–1	Guadalajara	41,221	Necaxa	1–0	Querétaro	15,866

Source: Liga MX

=== Final phase ===
==== Bracket ====
Quarter-finals
1	León	3	2	5
8	Tijuana	1	1	2
4	Cruz Azul	1	1	2
5	América	3	0	3
2	UANL (s)	1	1	2
7	Pachuca	1	1	2
3	Monterrey (s)	0	1	1
6	Necaxa	1	0	1

Semi-finals
1	León (s)	1	0	1
5	América	0	1	1
2	UANL (s)	0	1	1
3	Monterrey	1	0	1

Finals
1	León	0	0	0
2	UANL	1	0	1

- Teams were re-seeded each round.
- Team with more goals on aggregate after two matches advanced.
- Away goals rule was applied in the quarter-finals and semi-finals, but not the final.
- In the quarter-finals and semi-finals, if the two teams were tied on aggregate and away goals, the higher seeded team advanced.
- In the final, if the two teams were tied after both legs, the match went to extra time and, if necessary, a shoot-out.
- Both finalists qualified to the 2020 CONCACAF Champions League (champions as MEX2, runners-up as MEX4).

==== Quarterfinals ====
Team 1	Agg.	Team 2	1st leg	2nd leg
Tijuana	2–5	León	1–3	1–2
Pachuca	2–2 (s)	UANL	1–1	1–1
Necaxa	1–1 (s)	Monterrey	1–0	0–1
América	3–2	Cruz Azul	3–1	0–1

==== Semifinals ====
Team 1	Agg.	Team 2	1st leg	2nd leg
América	1–1 (s)	León	0–1	1–0
Monterrey	1–1 (s)	UANL	1–0	0–1

==== Finals ====
Team 1	Agg.	Team 2	1st leg	2nd leg
UANL	1–0	León	1–0	0–0

== Relegation table ==
The points doesn't count negative points.

Pos	Team	'16 A Pts	'17 C Pts	'17 A Pts	'18 C Pts	'18 A Pts	'19 C Pts	Total Pts	Total Pld	Avg	GD	Relegation
1	UANL	30	25	32	28	29	37	181	102	1.7745	+73	Safe for 2019–20 Season
2	Monterrey	25	27	37	29	30	30	178	102	1.7451	+61	Safe for 2019–20 Season
3	América	28	24	30	29	33	29	173	102	1.6961	+43	Safe for 2019–20 Season
4	Toluca	24	27	29	36	26	25	167	102	1.6373	+26	Safe for 2019–20 Season
5	Cruz Azul	19	21	27	22	36	30	155	102	1.5196	+29	Safe for 2019–20 Season
6	Tijuana	33	31	21	25	17	28	155	102	1.5196	+14	Safe for 2019–20 Season
7	León	26	20	26	22	18	41	153	102	1.5000	+15	Safe for 2019–20 Season
8	Pachuca	31	24	19	23	24	28	149	102	1.4608	+29	Safe for 2019–20 Season
9	Santos Laguna	16	26	18	29	30	22	141	102	1.3824	+7	Safe for 2019–20 Season
10	Necaxa	26	21	24	22	14	29	136	102	1.3333	+9	Safe for 2019–20 Season
11	Morelia	20	24	29	24	25	13	135	102	1.3235	–11	Safe for 2019–20 Season
12	UNAM	27	18	13	24	30	17	129	102	1.2647	–11	Safe for 2019–20 Season
13	Guadalajara	28	27	18	15	20	18	126	102	1.2353	–11	Safe for 2019–20 Season
14	Puebla	20	16	16	23	19	24	119	102	1.1667	–29	Safe for 2019–20 Season
15	Atlas	19	26	25	18	11	19	118	102	1.1569	–30	Safe for 2019–20 Season
16	BUAP	Ascenso MX		0	0	19	20	39	34	1.1471	–21	Safe for 2019–20 Season
17	Querétaro	20	19	16	18	26	11	110	102	1.0784	–43	Safe for 2019–20 Season
18	Veracruz (R)	12	21	14	18	10	0	73	102	0.7157	–99	Relegated to Ascenso MX

Last update: 5 May 2019
Rules for relegation: 1) Relegation coefficient; 2) Goal difference; 3) Number of goals scored; 4) Head-to-head results between tied teams; 5) Number of goals scored away; 6) Fair Play points
R = Relegated.
Source: LigaMX

1. 2017–18 accumulated points were not counted towards their relegation coefficient.

== Aggregate table ==
The aggregate table (the sum of points of both the Apertura and Clausura tournaments) was used to determine the participants of the 2019–20 Copa MX. This table also displays teams that qualified for the 2020 CONCACAF Champions League.

Pos	Team	Pld	W	D	L	GF	GA	GD	Pts	Qualification or relegation
1	Tigres (Note: Clausura champion) (C)	34	19	9	6	65	34	+31	66	2020 CONCACAF Champions League (Note: As Clausura champions (MEX2))
2	Cruz Azul	34	19	9	6	52	28	+24	66	2020 CONCACAF Champions League (Note: As Apertura runners-up (MEX3))
3	América (Note: Apertura champion) (C)	34	18	8	8	61	36	+25	62	2020 CONCACAF Champions League (Note: As Apertura champions (MEX1))
4	Monterrey	34	17	9	8	58	40	+18	60	2019–20 Copa MX Pot 1
5	León	34	18	5	11	59	37	+22	59	2020 CONCACAF Champions League (Note: As Clausura runners-up (MEX4))
6	Pachuca	34	14	10	10	58	44	+14	52	2019–20 Copa MX Pot 1
7	Santos Laguna	34	14	10	10	48	41	+7	52	2019–20 Copa MX Pot 1
8	Toluca	34	15	6	13	55	45	+10	51	2019–20 Copa MX Pot 1
9	Pumas	34	12	11	11	48	45	+3	47	2019–20 Copa MX Pot 1
10	Tijuana	34	13	6	15	38	44	−6	45	2019–20 Copa MX Pot 2
11	Puebla	34	11	11	12	41	51	−10	44	2019–20 Copa MX Pot 2
12	Necaxa	34	11	10	13	51	53	−2	43	2019–20 Copa MX Pot 2
13	BUAP (Note: BUAP relocated to Ciudad Juárez and became FC Juárez, thus Juárez replaced them in the tournament)	34	11	6	17	38	59	−21	39	2019–20 Copa MX Pot 2
14	Guadalajara	34	10	8	16	37	43	−6	38	2019–20 Copa MX Pot 3
15	Morelia	34	9	11	14	43	57	−14	38	2019–20 Copa MX Pot 3
16	Querétaro	34	10	7	17	30	50	−20	37	2019–20 Copa MX Pot 3
17	Atlas	34	8	6	20	30	55	−25	30	2019–20 Copa MX Pot 3
18	Veracruz (Note: Veracruz were docked 6 points, at the request of FIFA, over a failure to pay training compensation fees to Uruguayan club Montevideo Wanderers for Matías Santos.) (R)	34	2	8	24	24	74	−50	8	Relegated to Ascenso MX; 2019–20 Copa MX Pot 3

Source: Liga MX
Rules for classification: 1) Points; 2) Goal difference; 3) Number of goals scored; 4) Head-to-head results between tied teams; 5) Number of goals scored away; 6) Highest relegation coefficient; 7) Fair Play points
(C) Champions; (R) Relegated

== See also ==
- 2018–19 Ascenso MX season
- 2018–19 Liga MX Femenil season
