= Alejandro Castro (footballer) =

Mexican footballer (born 1987)

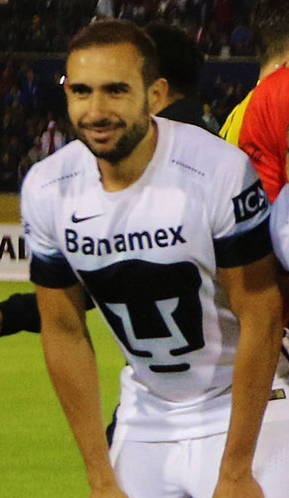
- Castro playing for UNAM in 2016

Personal information
- Full name: Alejandro Castro Flores
- Date of birth: 27 March 1987 (age 39)
- Place of birth: Mexico City, Mexico
- Height: 1.77 m (5 ft 10 in)
- Positions: Centre-back; defensive midfielder

Team information
- Current team: Olimpo United (AKL) (Manager)

Senior career*
Years	Team	Apps	(Gls)
2005–2016	Cruz Azul	134	(5)
2012	→ Tecos (loan)	17	(0)
2015–2016	→ UNAM (loan)	34	(1)
2016–2018	UNAM	16	(0)
2017–2018	→ Atlético San Luis (loan)	28	(0)
2018	→ Santos Laguna (loan)	0	(0)
Total		229	(6)

International career
2007	Mexico U20	2	(0)
2013	Mexico	5	(0)

Managerial career
- 2020: Atlético San Luis (Assistant)
- 2024–: Olimpo United (AKL)
- * Club domestic league appearances and goals

Alejandro Castro Flores (born 27 March 1987) is a Mexican former professional footballer who played as a centre-back or defensive midfielder.

== Career ==
He played for Atletico San Luis. His contract was not renewed for next season. He has previously played for Cruz Azul, most famous for missing his penalty and causing a deflection off Moises Munoz's header goal that saved Club America and took them into extra time eventually sending them into penalties. He has played for other Mexican teams such as Estudiantes Tecos, Pumas UNAM, and Santos Laguna scoring a total of 6 goals in his entire career.

== Cruz Azul ==
He arrived at the basic forces of Cruz Azul in 2001, where his first team was Cruz Azul Hidalgo from the promotion division. From the hand of Rubén Omar Romano he made his debut at Cruz Azul during the Apertura 2005, on Saturday, November 26, 2005, in a match where the sky blue team visited Pachuca, a match in which the teams divided points by drawing 0 to 0. Substituting for Joel Huiqui at 83 '. Then he had irregular periods and disappeared for a good time from the first team until the Clausura 2008 where he only played 1 game with Sergio Markarián in command of the machine. For the Apertura 2009, with the arrival of Enrique Meza on the bench, his performances gradually became more regular playing as a winger, even scoring a goal in the final against Monterrey.

== Estudiantes Tecos ==
After being 6 years in Cruz Azul the team did not require any more of his services and was loaned for the Clausura 2012 tournament, with Estudiantes Tecos, he played all the games as a starter under the technical direction of Héctor Hugo Eugui performing as central or lateral defender along with veteran Duilio Davino and Juan Carlos Leaño. Although it had a good performance, the team finally descended, and Estudiantes Tecos did not have the amount that Cruz Azul was asking for.

== Return to Cruz Azul ==
After the relegation of Estudiantes Tecos, and by not paying the amount requested by Cruz Azul, the player rejoined the cement team for the Apertura 2012 already with the new DT Guillermo Vázquez who used him as a central defender, being the architect of the debacle Cruz Azul in the final of the Clausura 2013, against América, since in that game he scored an own goal in the 93rd minute that sent the game to overtime and subsequent penalties, already in the penalty shootout he slipped and ordered his execution above the crossbar, after that encounter, his chemistry with the cement fans fell, to the extent that he was no longer used by coach Luís Fernando Tena.

== Pumas UNAM ==
After finalizing the Clausura 2015, Cruz Azul no longer required his services and is going on loan with the Pumas de la UNAM for the Apertura 2015, for 1 year with an option to purchase. His first tournament with the university students was good as he was part of the super-leader and runner-up team of the Apertura tournament. But the following competitions no longer received opportunities and at the end of the Clausura 2017 tournament he left the team.

== Ascenso MX & Santos Laguna ==
After leaving Pumas, he reached the Liga de Ascenso for the military with Atlético San Luis in the opening 2017 and closing 2018. He recovered his level and played a tournament with Celaya and returned to the First Division to play on loan with the Club Santos Laguna. Again he did not receive opportunities and at the beginning of 2019 he was left without a club.

== International ==
He was summoned for the first time by the then D.T. Interim of the senior team Jesús Ramírez, in 2008, the inclusion of Alejandro Castro Flores to the senior team generated much controversy, since he had not played a minute in the Mexican national first division.

After more than 5 years without having a call to the Senior National Team, the coach José Manuel de la Torre, called him in the final list of 23 players, for the 2013 Gold Cup, he debuted on July 7, 2013, against the Panama National Team in defeat 1-2 playing the 90 minutes.

After 2 years without having another call, coach Juan Carlos Osorio, calls him for the CONCACAF Eliminatoria matches heading to Russia 2018, for the matches against El Salvador and Honduras.

== Career statistics ==
=== International ===
As of match played 25 July 2013

National team	Year	Apps	Goals
Mexico	2013	5	0
Total		5	0

== Honours ==
Cruz Azul

- CONCACAF Champions League: 2013–14
