= Linio =

- Industry: eCommerce
- Founded: 1 January 2012
- Headquarters: Mexico City
- Parent: Chilean retail store Falabella

Linio is one of the leading marketplaces in Latin America, with presence in five countries and offering more than four million products.

== History ==
Linio began operations in 2012 in Mexico.

The company has been through various rounds of funding, including one that concluded in September 2016.

On August 1, 2018, the company was acquired by the Chilean retail store Falabella for USD$138 million.

It was announced that Linio would be ceasing operations in Mexico starting on April 8, 2024 to focus more on their collaboration with Soriana on their expansion of Sodimac and his target Falabella Soriana.
