= Christian Benítez =

Ecuadorian footballer (1986–2013)

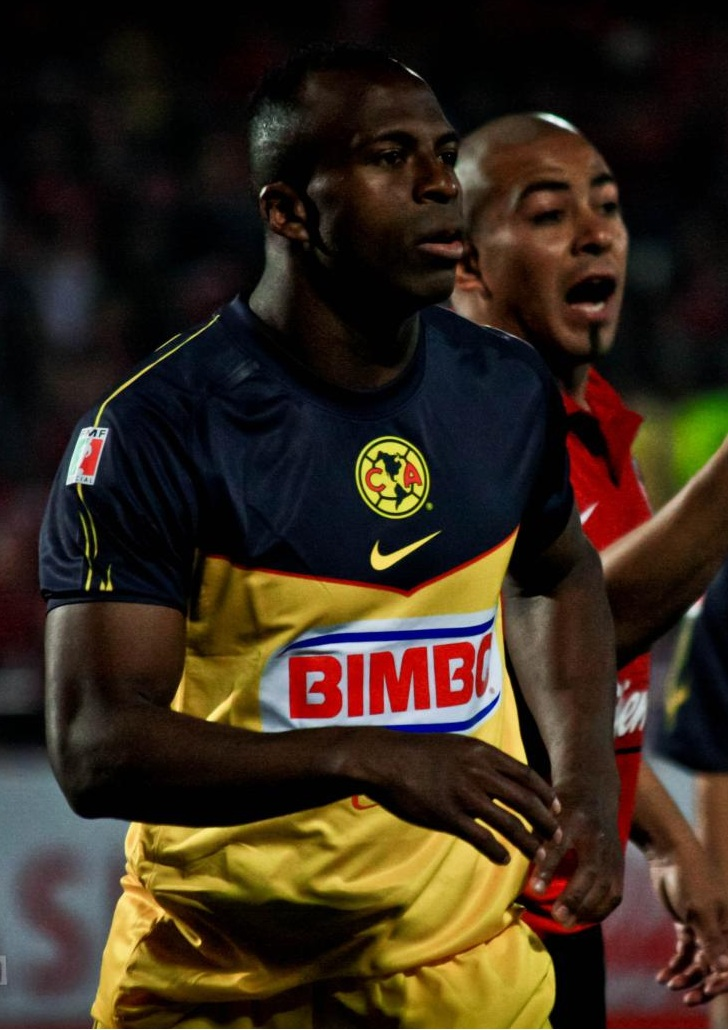
- Benítez with América in 2012

Personal information
- Full name: Christian Rogelio Benítez Betancourt
- Date of birth: 1 May 1986
- Place of birth: Quito, Ecuador
- Date of death: 29 July 2013 (aged 27)
- Place of death: Doha, Qatar
- Height: 1.68 m (5 ft 6 in)
- Position: Striker

Youth career
- 1997–2005: El Nacional

Senior career*
Years	Team	Apps	(Gls)
2004–2007	El Nacional	84	(29)
2007–2011	Santos Laguna	95	(51)
2009–2010	→ Birmingham City (loan)	30	(3)
2011–2013	América	79	(52)
2013	El Jaish	0	(0)
Total		288	(135)

International career
2005–2013	Ecuador	58	(24)
- * Club domestic league appearances and goals

Christian Rogelio Benítez Betancourt (1 May 1986 – 29 July 2013) was an Ecuadorian professional footballer who played as a striker.

He began his career with El Nacional in Ecuador and then joined Santos Laguna, with whom he won the award for Best Player of the Clausura 2008. He spent the 2009–10 season on loan to Premier League club Birmingham City, and then moved to Club América for a Mexican record US$10 million, where he was a regular scorer. He played for El Jaish of the Qatar Stars League at the time of his death. Benitez played 58 times for the Ecuador national football team from his debut in 2005, scoring 24 goals. He played for them at the 2006 FIFA World Cup and two Copa America tournaments.

Following his death, the Ecuadorian Football Federation retired Benítez's number 11 jersey from the national team. However, due to FIFA regulations, they had to reinstate it for the 2014 World Cup squad.

== Personal life ==
Benitez was born in Quito, the son of former Ecuador international footballer Ermen Benítez, and Rita Betancourt. In 2007, he married Liseth, daughter of Cléber Chalá, also an Ecuador international; she gave birth to twins in August 2009.

He played under the nickname Chucho, a name "used in the Spanish-speaking Americas when referring affectionately to a small, pesky dog".

== Club career ==
=== El Nacional ===
Due to a series of strong performances for El Nacional, Benítez was scouted by clubs such as Villarreal of Spain, though El Nacional denied any knowledge of the rumoured interest.

Benítez contributed 29 goals in 83 league matches as El Nacional won both the 2005 Clausura and 2006 League Championships.

=== Santos Laguna ===
In July 2007, he moved to Santos Laguna of the Mexican Primera División. With his arrival and that of Vicente Matías Vuoso, Santos had an impressive season with wins over several top Mexican clubs. In 2007, Benítez received an award as the best Ecuadorian footballer playing outside Ecuador, succeeding PSV Eindhoven's Édison Méndez.

Despite interest from Portuguese club Benfica, Benítez decided to remain in Mexico. His 10 goals made a major contribution to Santos winning the Clausura 2008 title, and his personal reward was selection as best player of the season.

=== Loan to Birmingham City ===
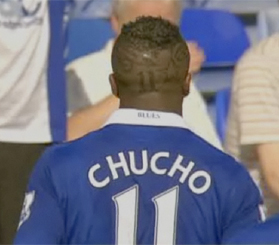
Benítez playing against Stoke City

On 3 June 2009, Birmingham City announced the signing of Benítez on a three-year contract for an undisclosed club record transfer fee, which press reports speculated to be in the region of £6 million rising to £9m. The move was subject to the striker receiving a work permit and passing a medical. The medical revealed unforeseen knee problems, which prompted the deal to be renegotiated on a "protected purchase" basis. The club would pay an initial $2m (£1.2m) with an option to abort the deal on medical grounds after the first year; thereafter the fee could potentially rise, depending on appearances and success, to a club record $12.5m (£7.7m). The player eventually signed on 7 July. The club later clarified that the initial £1.2m was in fact a loan fee. While recovering from shoulder surgery and awaiting his visa, Benítez played in an all-star match in Ecuador without asking the club's permission.

He made his debut as a second-half substitute in Birmingham's opening match of the season, a 1–0 defeat at Manchester United, and came close to equalising, drawing a "wonderful one-handed diving save" from Ben Foster. His first Premier League start came against Hull City on 19 September; he played a key role in a 1–0 win and "could have had a hat-trick but for the supreme goalkeeping of Boaz Myhill". Benítez scored his first goal for the Blues on 9 November away to Liverpool, with a close-range header after Scott Dann had nodded the ball on, in a game which finished 2–2. He scored the first of what manager Alex McLeish described as "two classy goals" as Birmingham knocked Everton out of the FA Cup at Goodison Park. However, after his season produced only four goals and Birmingham's attempt to renegotiate the agreed transfer fee was unsuccessful, the club chose not to take up their option to purchase, and the player returned to Santos Laguna.

=== Return to Santos Laguna 2010 ===
On 21 July 2010, Benítez signed a new three-year deal with Santos Laguna, in the first tournament after his return he was the top goalscorer with 16 goals. Leading the scoring table, Chucho led Santos to the 2010 Apertura Finals, losing to Monterrey.

=== Club América ===
==== 2011–12 season ====
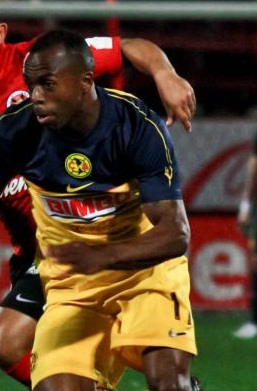
Benítez playing against Tijuana

Benitez signed to play for América on 22 May 2011. The transfer fee was reported to be of $10 million, which established a record for a club in Mexico. He scored a goal in his debut on 24 July in the 2–1 win against Querétaro. On 21 August, Benítez made his first hat trick with América against Atlas in a 5–2 win. In his first Súper Clásico, Benítez scored a header in a 3–1 loss to Chivas.

Benítez scored the opening goal for Club América's Clausura 2012 season in a 2–0 win against Querétaro. He ended the season with 14 goals and ended up being the league's top scorer along with Iván Alonso.

==== 2012–13 season ====
Benítez played his first game of the 2012–13 season on 21 July against Monterrey, in a 0–0 away draw. On 28 July, he scored his first goals of the season in a 4–2 victory over Chiapas. On 11 November, Benitez became joint top goal-scorer of the 2012 Apertura alongside Atlante's Esteban Paredes. Three days later, he scored both goals in a 2–0 play-off quarter-final win away to Morelia.

Benítez scored his first goals of the 2013 Clausura season in a 2–0 away win against Jaguares de Chiapas. On 2 March, he scored a hat trick, 2 headers and a left-footed strike against Cruz Azul in a 3–0 win. On 27 April, after losing 2–0 in an away match against Pachuca, Benitez scored a hat-trick to lead América to a 4–2 win. Benitez ended up as the Clausura 2013 Liga MX top scorer for the third consecutive season. On 26 May Benitez became Liga MX 2013 Clausura champions after defeating Cruz Azul 4–2 in a penalty shoot-out, where he converted the second penalty.

=== El Jaish ===
Benítez left the club on 6 July 2013, and signed a contract with Qatari club El Jaish. He made his debut in a match against Qatar SC in the Sheikh Jassim Cup on 28 July "without complaining of any health problems", according to El Jaish officials. This was the only match he played for the club. A day later, he died from cardiac arrest at age 27.

== International career ==
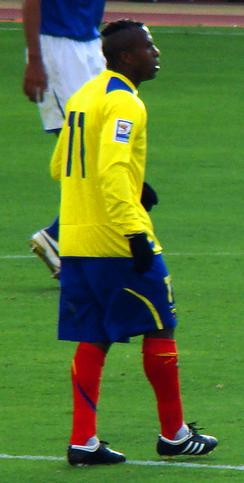
Benítez playing for Ecuador in 2009

Benítez was a member of the Ecuador national team at the 2006 FIFA World Cup in Germany. Although considered by many as a surprise selection by coach Luis Fernando Suárez, he had impressed with his speed, elusiveness and skill in pre-World Cup showings against the Netherlands and Japan, in addition to his 2006 Copa Libertadores experience. He was a candidate for the Gillette Best Young Player Award, a new award made at the end of the FIFA World Cup to the best young player born on or after 1 January 1985. His only appearance was in the 3–0 loss to Germany, replacing Felix Borja midway through the match.

His first international goal came in September 2006 against Peru. Then, in April 2007, he scored another goal against Peru in Ecuador's 2–0 win in a friendly match held in the Mini Estadi in Barcelona, Spain. He also scored in a 1–1 draw with the Republic of Ireland, also in a friendly, played in New Jersey on 23 May 2007. This added to the belief that he could excel in Europe.

Benítez started all three games during the 2007 Copa América, scoring against Chile as Ecuador were eliminated in the first stage, losing all three matches. In an international friendly against El Salvador on 8 September 2007, Benítez scored twice in an emphatic 5–1 home win in Quito.

In a 2010 FIFA World Cup qualifier against Bolivia, he scored his country's third goal in a 3–1 win. A month later, he scored the only goal against Chile.

== Death and legacy ==
On 29 July 2013, Benítez entered a hospital in Doha, Qatar, because of a severe pain in his abdomen. According to Miguel Herrera and other teammates in an interview with Mexican morning show Matutino Express, he did not receive immediate medical attention and a few hours later, Benítez went into respiratory failure. He died from complications leading to cardiac arrest at the age of 27.

Tens of thousands of people filed past the body, which lay in a glass-topped casket in the Coliseo General Rumiñahui in Quito, before the public funeral ceremony, which was attended by sporting and political figures including the president of Ecuador, Rafael Correa. The cortege received a police motorcycle escort through crowded streets to a private interment.

Following his death, the Ecuadorian Football Federation announced that it would retire his number 11 jersey from the national team. FIFA regulations required Ecuador to reinstate number 11 to their squad for the 2014 World Cup in Brazil; it was allocated to Felipe Caicedo. His international teammate Antonio Valencia had Benítez's number tattooed onto his upper arm in tribute after his death.

A multipurpose stadium was constructed and named in his honour in Guayaquil; opened in February 2014, it is used as the home stadium of Guayaquil City F.C. Later that year, a statue of Benítez in typical goal celebration pose was unveiled at Santos Laguna's stadium. He was the third Santos player to be so honoured, after Jared Borgetti and Rodrigo Ruiz.

== Career statistics ==
=== Club ===
Appearances and goals by club, season and competition
Club	Season	League			National cup		League cup		Continental		Total	
Club	Season	Division	Apps	Goals	Apps	Goals	Apps	Goals	Apps	Goals	Apps	Goals
El Nacional	2004	Serie A	1	0					–		1	0
El Nacional	2005	Serie A	30	6					1	0	31	6
El Nacional	2006	Serie A	38	16					12	0	50	16
El Nacional	2007	Serie A	15	7					4	1	19	8
El Nacional	Total		84	29					17	1	101	30
Santos Laguna	2007–08	Primera División	40	17					–		40	17
Santos Laguna	2008–09	Primera División	20	14					8	5	28	19
Santos Laguna	2010–11	Primera División	35	20					4	1	39	21
Santos Laguna	Total		95	51					12	6	107	57
Birmingham City (loan)	2009–10	Premier League	30	3	5	1	1	0	–		36	4
América	2011–12	Primera División	36	22					–		36	22
América	2012–13	Primera División	43	30			–		–		43	30
América	Total		79	52					0	0	79	52
Career total			288	135	5	1	1	0	29	7	323	143

=== International goals ===
Scores and results list Ecuador's goal tally first, score column indicates score after each Benítez goal.

List of international goals scored by Christian Benítez
#	Date	Venue	Opponent	Score	Final	Competition
1	6 September 2006	East Rutherford, New Jersey, United States	Peru	1–0	1–1	International friendly
2	23 May 2007	East Rutherford, New Jersey, United States	Republic of Ireland	1–0	1–1	International friendly
3	6 June 2007	Barcelona, Spain	Peru	1–0	2–0	International friendly
4	26 June 2007	Puerto Ordaz, Venezuela	Chile	1–2	2–3	2007 Copa América
5	8 September 2007	Quito, Ecuador	El Salvador	2–0	5–1	International friendly
6	8 September 2007	Quito, Ecuador	El Salvador	4–1	5–1	International friendly
7	20 August 2008	East Rutherford, New Jersey, United States	Colombia	1–0	1–0	International friendly
8	6 September 2008	Quito, Ecuador	Bolivia	3–1	3–1	2010 FIFA World Cup qualification
9	12 October 2008	Quito, Ecuador	Chile	1–0	1–0	2010 FIFA World Cup qualification
10	9 September 2009	La Paz, Bolivia	Bolivia	3–1	3–1	2010 FIFA World Cup qualification
11	4 September 2010	Zapopan, Mexico	Mexico	1–0	2–1	International friendly
12	12 October 2010	Montreal, Canada	Poland	1–0	2–2	International friendly
13	12 October 2010	Montreal, Canada	Poland	2–2	2–2	International friendly
14	17 November 2010	Quito, Ecuador	Venezuela	1–0	4–1	International friendly
15	17 November 2010	Quito, Ecuador	Venezuela	2–0	4–1	International friendly
16	1 June 2011	Toronto, Canada	Canada	1–1	2–2	International friendly
17	2 September 2011	Quito, Ecuador	Jamaica	3–0	5–2	International friendly
18	2 September 2011	Quito, Ecuador	Jamaica	4–0	5–2	International friendly
19	6 September 2011	Quito, Ecuador	Costa Rica	4–0	4–0	International friendly
20	7 October 2011	Quito, Ecuador	Venezuela	2–0	2–0	2014 FIFA World Cup qualification
21	15 November 2011	Quito, Ecuador	Peru	2–0	2–0	2014 FIFA World Cup qualification
22	10 June 2012	Quito, Ecuador	Colombia	1–0	1–0	2014 FIFA World Cup qualification
23	21 March 2013	Quito, Ecuador	El Salvador	2–0	5–0	International friendly
24	26 March 2013	Quito, Ecuador	Paraguay	3–1	4–1	2014 FIFA World Cup qualification

== Honors ==
=== Club ===
El Nacional

- Serie A: 2005 Clausura, 2006

Santos Laguna

- Mexican Primera División: Clausura 2008

Club América

- Liga MX: Clausura 2013

=== Individual ===
- Serie A Best Player: 2006 Serie A
- Liga MX Golden Ball: Clausura 2008, Apertura 2012
- Liga MX Golden Boot: Apertura 2010, Clausura 2012, Apertura 2012, Clausura 2013
