= Clásico Tapatío =

Rivalry in Mexican football

- Sport: association football
- First meeting: 15 September 1916; Atlas 0, Guadalajara 0
- Latest meeting: 10 October 2026; Atlas 1, Guadalajara 1
- Next meeting: TBD

Statistics
- Total meetings: 286
- All-time series: Guadalajara leads 106-94-87

Guadalajara	Atlas

El Clásico Tapatío is a Guadalajara, Jalisco-based sporting rivalry between C.D. Guadalajara and Atlas. It is considered the oldest clásico of Mexican football since it dates back to the year 1916.

== History ==
The rivalry was born shortly after the founding of Atlas in August 1916 (Club Deportivo Guadalajara was founded in May 1906, along with the two clubs being from the same city, there was also a difference of social class between the two teams. While Guadalajara were followed by the middle class of the city. Atlas represented and was the favorite of the upper class, due to the fact that the founders of the club came from wealthy families and learned the sport of football in their travel as students to the United Kingdom.

The first encounter between the two clubs came in a friendly shortly after Atlas was founded, the result was a 0–0 draw. The first tournament match came in the "Torneo de Primavera"(Tournament of Spring) of 1917, where Atlas was victorious over Chivas by a score of 2–1 despite complaints of bad referee performance by Chivas. Chivas were so angered by the result, that they refused to play in the next Liga Amateur de Jalisco tournament of 1917–18, unless the president of refereeing, Justo García Godoy, resigned from his position; when Godoy failed to do so Chivas refused to join the tournament. After the tournament was over, Atlas had won their first amateur league and the leader of the collegiate had resigned, Chivas challenged Atlas to a series of 3 matches. Each of the teams won one of the first two matches, both only by a single goal, and the third was won by Atlas; this time there were more complaints because Atlas had used 7 substitutions from the no longer existent Club Colón.

There is a legend that ensures that the first match was favorable to the Atlas by a score of 18–0, although the first reference is a note for a newspaper in Guadalajara published about 50 years after the alleged occurrence of the match. Currently there is no data to confirm the confrontation. Some believe that this match never took place and others that it was only a match without official status between followers of the club.

In 1955 the most curious of the Classical Tapatio happened. The goalkeeper of the Guadalajara, Jaime "Tubo" Gómez, was insulted during a large part of the meeting by the fans. After seeing that the match would be won by Chivas easily after leading 5–0, "Tubo" requested a magazine from someone outside the field, then he sat next to one of the goalposts and began to read it in clear mockery of Atlas faithful.

Atlas and Guadalajara have faced two times in playoffs, both in the quarter-finals. On the first occasion, in the summer tournament 2000, Chivas moved on to the semi-finals to tie both encounters 1–1, since the Guadalajara had better position in the general table. Three and a half years later, in the Opening Tournament 2004, Atlas collected revenge and eliminated their hated rivals by global marker of 4–3. In both games the Guadalajara failed a winning penalty kick. Neither of the teams would move past the semi-finals on either occasion, Chivas were defeated by Toluca and Atlas were defeated by Pumas.

== Official matches ==
=== Liga Amateur de Jalisco ===
Season	Winner	Result	Season	Winner	Result
1918–19	Tie	0–0	1919–20	Atlas	4–0
1919–20	Atlas	2–1	1920–21	Atlas	1–0
1920–21	Guadalajara	1–0	1921–22	Guadalajara	2–1
1921–22	Tie	0–0	1922–23	Guadalajara	2–1
1922–23	Tie	2–2	1923–24	Atlas	3–0
1923–24	1	–	1924–25	Atlas	3–2
1924–25	Guadalajara	2–1	1925–26	Tie	1–1
1925–26	Atlas	3–0	1926–27	Atlas	2–0
1926–27	Guadalajara	3–2	1927–28	Guadalajara	3–0
1928–29	Guadalajara	5–1	1929–30	Tie	1–1
1929–30	Guadalajara	2–1	1930–31	Guadalajara	1–0
1931–32	Atlas	1–0	1932–33	Guadalajara	3–2
1932–33	Guadalajara	10–1	1933–34	Atlas	3–2
1933–34	Tie	4–4	1934–35	Guadalajara	1–0
1934–35	Guadalajara	2–1	1935–36	Atlas	3–2
1935–36	Guadalajara	3–2	1936–37	Tie	3–3
1937–38	Guadalajara	4–3	1938–39	Atlas	4–3
1938–39	Guadalajara	2–1	1939–40	Guadalajara	4–1
1939–40	Atlas	3–1	1940–41	Guadalajara	3–0
1940–41	Guadalajara	6–3	1941–42	Guadalajara	3–1
1941–42	Atlas	3–1	1941–42	Guadalajara	4–3
1942–43^{2}	Guadalajara	4–3

1. No Data.
2. Copa Jalisco.

=== Copa México ===
Season	Home	Res.	Away
1942–43	Guadalajara	2–9	Atlas
1943–44	Guadalajara	1–1	Atlas
1943–44	Atlas	2–1	Guadalajara
1944–45	Guadalajara	1–2	Atlas
1947–48	Guadalajara	1–0	Atlas
1948–49	Atlas	3–0	Guadalajara
1950–51	Guadalajara	3–0	Atlas
1959–60	Guadalajara	2–2	Atlas
1959–60	Atlas	4–1	Guadalajara
1963–64	Atlas	0–2	Guadalajara
1963–64	Guadalajara	2–2	Atlas
1964–65	Atlas	5–1	Guadalajara
1973–74	Guadalajara	3–0	Atlas
1995–96	Atlas	4–2	Guadalajara
1995–96	Guadalajara	1–0	Atlas

=== Campeon de Campeones ===
Season	Home	Res.	Away
1962	Guadalajara	0–2	Atlas

=== Primera División ===
1. No game; Due to Atlas being in Second Division.
2. No game.

Season	Home	Res.	Away
1943–44	Guadalajara	7–3	Atlas
1943–44	Atlas	3–1	Guadalajara
1944–45	Atlas	4–3	Guadalajara
1944–45	Guadalajara	3–1	Atlas
1945–46	Guadalajara	1–1	Atlas
1945–46	Atlas	2–0	Guadalajara
1946–47	Guadalajara	1–1	Atlas
1946–47	Atlas	2–1	Guadalajara
1947–48	Atlas	2–1	Guadalajara
1947–48	Guadalajara	2–2	Atlas
1948–49	Atlas	3–0	Guadalajara
1948–49	Guadalajara	3–1	Atlas
1949–50	Atlas	2–1	Guadalajara
1949–50	Guadalajara	2–1	Atlas
1950–51	Atlas	4–0	Guadalajara
1950–51	Guadalajara	0–1	Atlas
1951–52	Atlas	1–2	Guadalajara
1951–52	Guadalajara	1–1	Atlas
1952–53	Atlas	2–2	Guadalajara
1952–53	Guadalajara	0–1	Atlas
1953–54	Atlas	1–1	Guadalajara
1953–54	Guadalajara	5–1	Atlas
1954–55	-	1	–
1954–55	-	1	–
1955–56	Atlas	2–1	Guadalajara
1955–56	Guadalajara	3–0	Atlas
1956–57	Atlas	0–2	Guadalajara
1956–57	Guadalajara	0–2	Atlas
1957–58	Guadalajara	3–0	Atlas
1957–58	Atlas	2–0	Guadalajara
1958–59	Atlas	2–2	Guadalajara
1958–59	Guadalajara	3–2	Atlas
1959–60	Atlas	1–1	Guadalajara
1959–60	Guadalajara	0–0	Atlas
1960–61	Atlas	2–0	Guadalajara
1960–61	Guadalajara	3–1	Atlas
1961–62	Guadalajara	1–0	Atlas
1961–62	Atlas	2–3	Guadalajara
1962–63	Atlas	4–2	Guadalajara
1962–63	Guadalajara	0–0	Atlas
1963–64	Guadalajara	1–2	Atlas
1963–64	Atlas	0–3	Guadalajara
1964–65	Atlas	1–3	Guadalajara
1964–65	Guadalajara	2–1	Atlas
1965–66	Guadalajara	0–2	Atlas
1965–66	Atlas	2–0	Guadalajara
1966–67	Atlas	1–1	Guadalajara
1966–67	Guadalajara	2–2	Atlas
1967–68	Atlas	0–1	Guadalajara
1967–68	Guadalajara	2–0	Atlas
1968–69	Guadalajara	2–2	Atlas
1968–69	Atlas	0–0	Guadalajara
1969–70	Atlas	1–3	Guadalajara
1969–70	Guadalajara	5–1	Atlas
México '70	Atlas	1–1	Guadalajara
México '70	Guadalajara	1–1	Atlas
1970–71	Guadalajara	2–1	Atlas
1970–71	Atlas	1–2	Guadalajara
1971–72	-	1	–
1971–72	-	1	–
1972–73	Guadalajara	1–0	Atlas
1972–73	Atlas	2–1	Guadalajara
1973–74	Atlas	1–3	Guadalajara
1973–74	Guadalajara	1–2	Atlas
1974–75	Atlas	5–1	Guadalajara
1974–75	Guadalajara	2–2	Atlas
1975–76	Atlas	1–2	Guadalajara
1975–76	Guadalajara	1–2	Atlas
1976–77	Atlas	1–0	Guadalajara
1976–77	Guadalajara	1–1	Atlas
1977–78	Guadalajara	3–2	Atlas
1977–78	Atlas	1–1	Guadalajara
1978–79	-	1	–
1978–79	-	1	–
1979–80	Guadalajara	0–0	Atlas
1979–80	Atlas	0–4	Guadalajara
1980–81	Atlas	0–0	Guadalajara
1980–81	Guadalajara	1–2	Atlas
1981–82	Guadalajara	3–0	Atlas
1981–82	Atlas	1–0	Guadalajara
1982–83	Atlas	2–2	Guadalajara
1982–83	Guadalajara	1–1	Atlas
1983–84	Guadalajara	1–1	Atlas
1983–84	Atlas	3–5	Guadalajara
1984–85	Guadalajara	0–0	Atlas
1984–85	Atlas	0–0	Guadalajara
Prode '85	-	2	–
México '86	Guadalajara	2–2	Atlas
México '86	Atlas	2–1	Guadalajara
1986–87	Guadalajara	3–0	Atlas
1986–87	Atlas	1–2	Guadalajara
1987–88	Guadalajara	3–1	Atlas
1987–88	Atlas	1–1	Guadalajara
1988–89	Atlas	2–2	Guadalajara
1988–89	Guadalajara	3–0	Atlas
1989–90	Guadalajara	1–2	Atlas
1989–90	Atlas	1–1	Guadalajara
1990–91	Guadalajara	0–0	Atlas
1990–91	Atlas	1–0	Guadalajara
1991–92	Guadalajara	1–0	Atlas
1991–92	Atlas	2–2	Guadalajara
1992–93	Atlas	2–1	Guadalajara
1992–93	Guadalajara	1–1	Atlas
1993–94	Atlas	1–1	Guadalajara
1993–94	Guadalajara	0–0	Atlas
1994–95	Atlas	0–1	Guadalajara
1994–95	Guadalajara	2–1	Atlas
1995–96	Guadalajara	5–2	Atlas
1995–96	Atlas	2–0	Guadalajara
Invierno '96	Atlas	2–2	Guadalajara
Verano '97	Guadalajara	2–2	Atlas
Invierno '97	Guadalajara	2–1	Atlas
Verano '98	Atlas	3–2	Guadalajara
Invierno '98	Atlas	0–0	Guadalajara
Verano '99	Guadalajara	1–1	Atlas
Invierno '99	Atlas	0–0	Guadalajara
Verano '00	Guadalajara	1–3	Atlas
Invierno '00	Atlas	2–0	Guadalajara
Verano '01	Atlas	3–2	Guadalajara
Invierno '01	Guadalajara	0–3	Atlas
Verano '02	Guadalajara	1–1	Atlas
Apertura '02	Atlas	1–2	Guadalajara
Clausura '03	Guadalajara	1–3	Atlas
Apertura '03	Guadalajara	1–0	Atlas
Clausura '04	Atlas	1–1	Guadalajara
Apertura '04	Guadalajara	1–3	Atlas
Clausura '05	Atlas	2–3	Guadalajara
Apertura '05	Atlas	2–2	Guadalajara
Clausura '06	Guadalajara	0–3	Atlas
Apertura '06	Guadalajara	3–1	Atlas
Clausura '07	Atlas	0–2	Guadalajara
Apertura '07	Guadalajara	3–1	Atlas
Clausura '08	Atlas	0–2	Guadalajara
Apertura '08	Atlas	0–1	Guadalajara
Clausura '09	Guadalajara	0–1	Atlas
Apertura '09	Atlas	1–4	Guadalajara
Bicentenario '10	Guadalajara	0–2	Atlas
Apertura '10	Guadalajara	2–2	Atlas
Clausura '11	Atlas	1–1	Guadalajara
Apertura '11	Atlas	1–1	Guadalajara
Clausura '12	Guadalajara	0–1	Atlas
Apertura '12	Guadalajara	2–0	Atlas
Clausura '13	Atlas	1–0	Guadalajara
Apertura '13	Guadalajara	1–1	Atlas
Clausura '14	Atlas	1–1	Guadalajara
Apertura '14	Guadalajara	0–1	Atlas
Clausura '15	Atlas	1–1	Guadalajara
Apertura '15	Atlas	0–1	Guadalajara
Clausura '16	Guadalajara	1–0	Atlas
Apertura '16	Guadalajara	2–2	Atlas
Clausura '17	Atlas	1–2	Guadalajara
Apertura '17	Guadalajara	1–2	Atlas
Clausura '18	Atlas	1–0	Guadalajara
Apertura '18	Atlas	0–1	Guadalajara
Clausura '19	Guadalajara	3–0	Atlas
Apertura '19	Guadalajara	1–0	Atlas
Clausura '20	Atlas	1–2	Guadalajara
Apertura '20	Guadalajara	3–2	Atlas
Clausura '21	Atlas	0–1	Guadalajara
Apertura '21	Guadalajrara	0–1	Atlas
Clausura '22	Atlas	1–1	Guadalajara
Apertura '22	Guadalajara	1–1	Atlas
Clausura '23	Atlas	3–3	Guadalajara
Apertura '23	Guadalajara	4–1	Atlas
Clausura '24	Atlas	0–1	Guadalajara
Apertura '24	Guadalajara	2–3	Atlas
Clausura '25	Guadalajara	1–1	Atlas
Apertura '25	Guadalajara	4–1	Atlas
Clausura '26	Atlas	1–2	Guadalajara

=== Play-In ===
Season	Home	Res.	Away
Play-In Apertura '24	Guadalajara	1–2	Atlas

=== Playoffs ===
Season	First Leg	Second Leg	Aggregate
Verano 2000	Atlas 1-1 Guadalajara	Guadalajara 1-1 Atlas	2-2^{1}
Apertura 2004	Guadalajara 0-1 Atlas	Atlas 3-3 Guadalajara	4-3
Clausura 2015	Guadalajara 0-0 Atlas	Atlas 1-4 Guadalajara	1-4
Clausura 2017	Atlas 1-0 Guadalajara	Guadalajara 1-0 Atlas	1-1^{2}
Clausura 2022	Guadalajara 1–2 Atlas	Atlas 1–1 Guadalajara	3–2
Clausura 2023	Atlas 1-0 Guadalajara	Guadalajara 1-0 Atlas	1-1^{3}

1. Guadalajara advanced due to better overall position in the league table.

== Statistics ==
Updated 13 August 2022

Tournament	P	WA	D	WG	GoalA	GoalG
Liga	155	46	51	58	200	230
Liguilla	10	3	5	2	11	12
Liga Amateur de Jalisco	43^{1}	14	7	22	76	92
Copa México	22	7	6	9	34	34
Campeón de Campeones	1	1	0	0	2	0
Pre Libertadores	1	0	1	0	2	2
Interliga	1	0	0	1	1	3
TOTAL OFICIAL	233	71	70	92	328	376
Friendlies	53	21	17	15	73	68
TOTAL	286	92	87	107	401	444

P. Number of matches played .
WA. Wins for Atlas.
WG. Wins for Guadalajara.
D. Draws.
GoalA. Goals for Atlas.
GoalG. Goals for Guadalajara.
1. In total there were 44 games where the result is unknown.
