= Juan Antonio Torres =

Mexican footballer and manager (born 1968)

Personal information
- Full name: Juan Antonio Torres Servín
- Date of birth: 15 July 1968 (age 58)
- Place of birth: Mexico City, Mexico
- Height: 1.72 m (5 ft 7 1/2 in)
- Position: Midfielder

Team information
- Current team: Puebla (Assistant)

Senior career*
Years	Team	Apps	(Gls)
1988–1996	UNAM		
1996–1997	Pachuca	22	(2)
1999	Santos Laguna	25	(1)
1998	Nacional Tijuana		
1999–2002	C.D. Guadalajara	5	(0)
2002	Tigrillos de la UANL		

Managerial career
- 2007–2009: Pachuca (assistant)
- 2012–2013: UNAM
- 2019–2020: Antigua
- 2021–2022: Tlaxcala
- 2022: Municipal
- 2023–2024: Juárez Reserves and Academy
- 2024: Juárez (Interim)
- 2024: Juárez (assistant)
- 2025–2026: Jaiba Brava (Assistant)
- 2026–: Puebla (Assistant)
- * Club domestic league appearances and goals

Juan Antonio Torres Servín (born 15 July 1968) is a Mexican football manager and former player.
