= Moisés Muñoz =

Mexican footballer (born 1980)

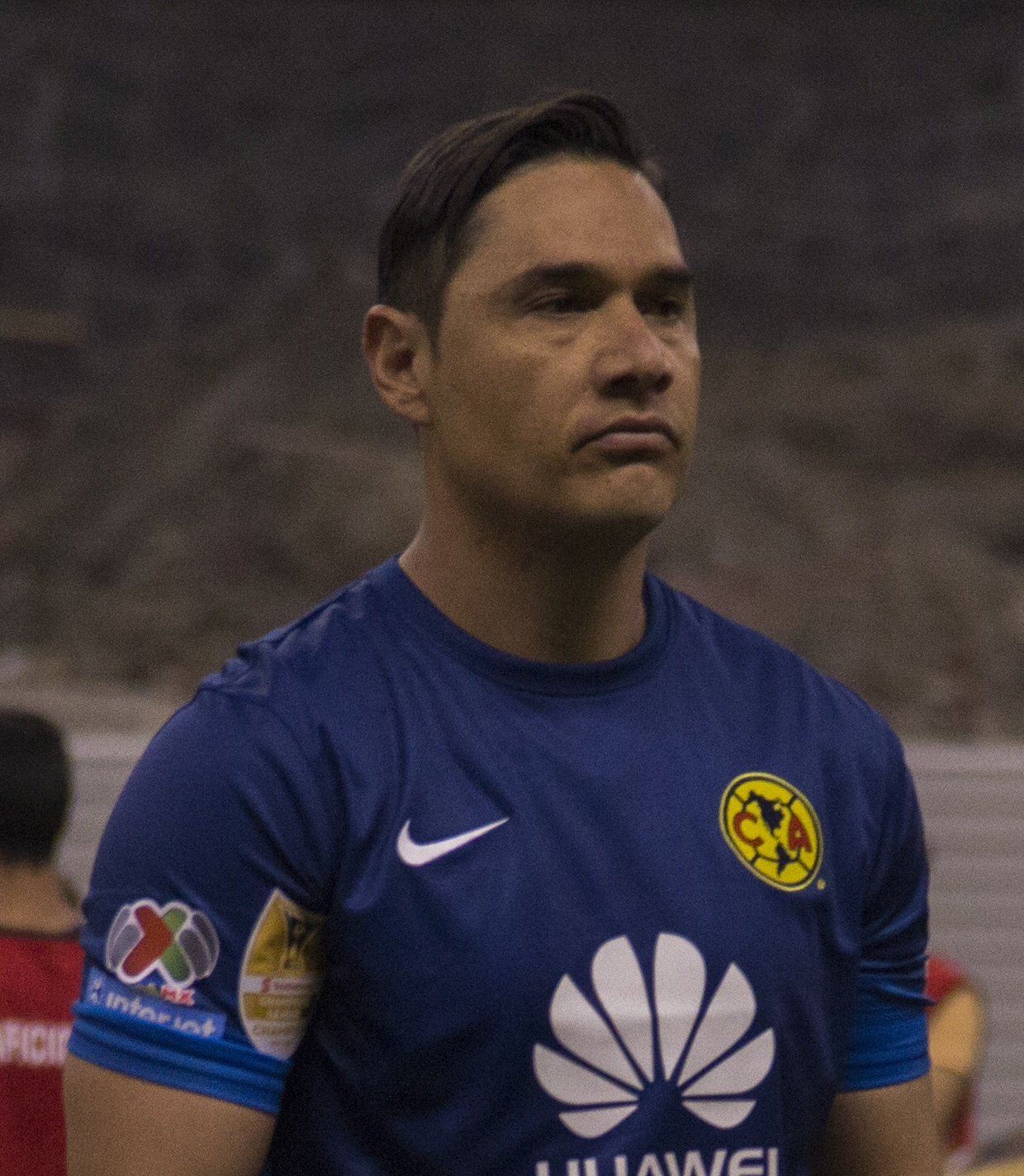
- Muñoz with América in 2016

Personal information
- Full name: Moisés Alberto Muñoz Rodríguez
- Date of birth: 1 February 1980 (age 46)
- Place of birth: Aguililla, Michoacán, Mexico
- Height: 1.85 m (6 ft 1 in)
- Position: Goalkeeper

Senior career*
Years	Team	Apps	(Gls)
1999–2010	Morelia	282	(0)
2006	Morelia Primera A	1	(0)
2010–2011	Atlante	53	(0)
2012–2016	América	175	(1)
2017	→ Chiapas (loan)	17	(0)
2017–2018	→ Puebla (loan)	28	(0)
Total		556	(1)

International career
2004–2017	Mexico	18	(0)
Medal record
Men's football
Representing Mexico
CONCACAF Gold Cup
Winner	2015 United States–Canada	Team
- * Club domestic league appearances and goals

Moisés Alberto Muñoz Rodríguez (born 1 February 1980) is a Mexican former professional footballer who played as a goalkeeper.

Muñoz began his career in 1999 with Monarcas Morelia, playing in over 200 matches for the club, before eventually moving to Atlante in 2010. In 2011, he was sold to Club América, with whom he won two league titles and two CONCACAF Champions League titles. He also had loan stints with Chiapas and Puebla before retiring in 2018.

He has also been called up to the Mexico national team, making his debut in 2004 and was a part of the national team which finished in fourth place at the 2005 FIFA Confederations Cup. In June 2012, Muñoz was involved in a car accident while driving from Morelia.

== Early life ==
Muñoz was born in Aguililla, Michoacán, on 1 February 1980. Muñoz speaks English fluently, having been educated in Northern California during his formative years, attending elementary school and junior high school in Redwood City as an undocumented child of migrant workers. He never legalized his status in the United States, but his parents have U.S. resident status and live in San Jose. He returned to Mexico before high school and by age 19 was playing for his hometown club in Morelia.

== Club career ==
=== Morelia ===
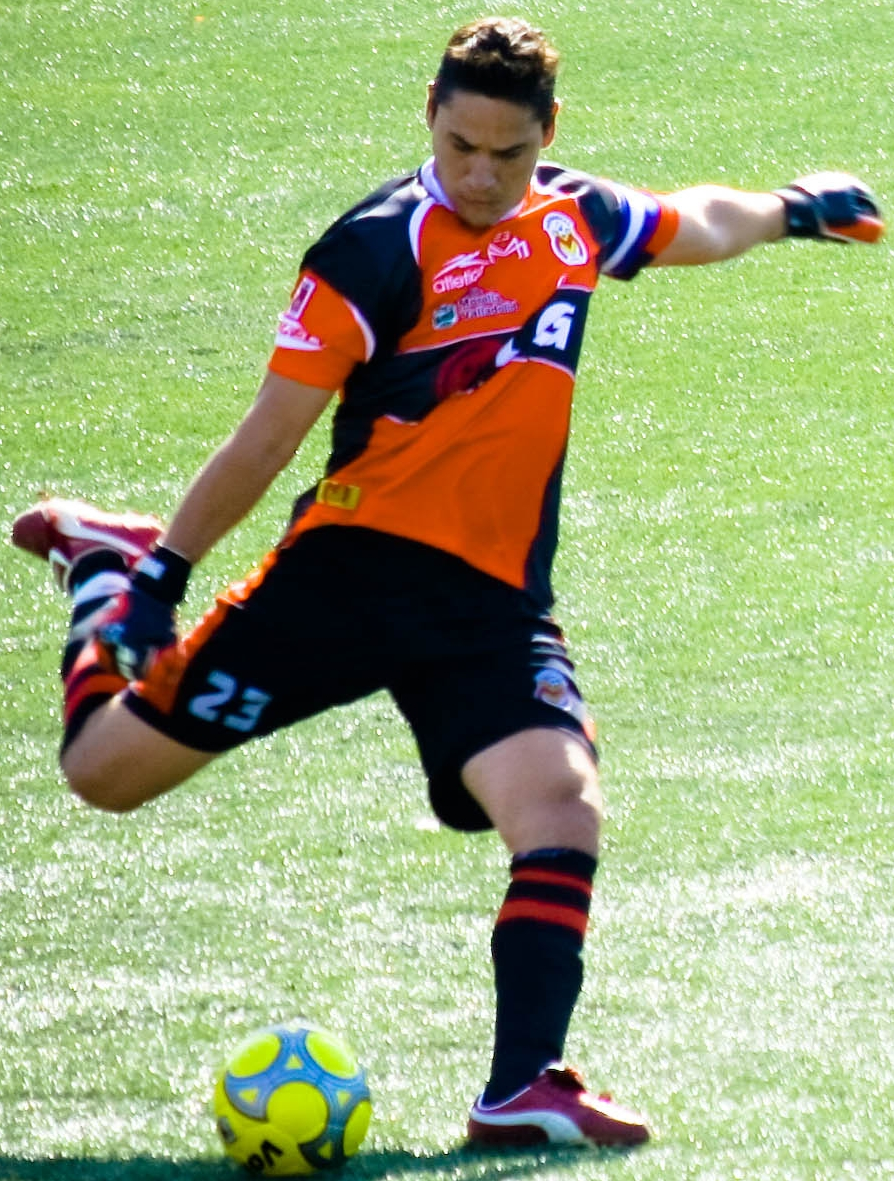
Muñoz with Monarcas Morelia.

Moisés Muñoz made his league debut with Monarcas Morelia on 19 September 1999 against Pachuca. Muñoz initially was used as back-up for Ángel Comizzo. Morelia won the Invierno 2000 league tournament, achieving their first league title against Toluca, with Muñoz failing to appear in a match. Muñoz did not become a regular starter until the Apertura 2002 season, the same season Morelia advanced to the league final against Toluca, which they lost 4–2 on aggregate.

The following season he helped Morelia advance to its second straight league final but lost to Monterrey. A native of the city of Morelia, he became a mainstay in the team, with his eleven years at the club one of the longest for a goalkeeper in the league. He played in 282 matches before being transferred to Atlante in the 2010 Draft.

=== Atlante ===
For the Apertura 2010 tournament, Muñoz joined Atlante in a trade for Argentine goalkeeper Federico Vilar. He would go on to be a permanent fixture for the club until his departure in 2011, making 53 league appearances.

=== América ===
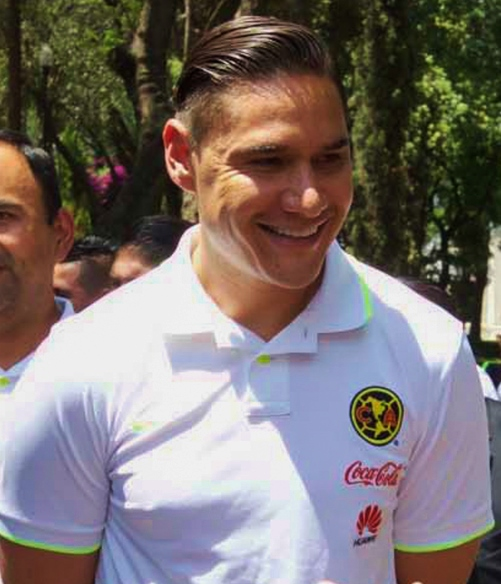
Muñoz in 2016

On 25 November 2011, Muñoz joined Club América. In his debut tournament with the club – the Clausura 2012 – he started in 21 games and played in 90 minutes in 20 of them; he was subbed off in the second half of the league match against Atlas.

In May 2013, Muñoz played his first league final with América, conceding the only goal in the 0–1 first-leg loss to Cruz Azul. His performance in the second-leg at the Estadio Azteca on 26 May helped América achieve a dramatic comeback after losing 0–1, 0–2 on aggregate, to tie the match 1–1 in the 88th minute with a goal from captain Aquivaldo Mosquera. In the 92nd minute, with seconds left of injury time, Muñoz scored a diving header off an Osvaldo Martínez corner, which deflected off Cruz Azul defender Alejandro Castro, to send the game into extra-time, and subsequently to a penalty shoot-out. He saved Javier Orozco's penalty kick, and América would go on to win the shoot-out 4–2 and win their eleventh league title. Muñoz's performance was praised by various media outlets.

On 1 October 2016, Muñoz played his 500th league game in a 1–1 draw against Monterrey.

== International career ==
Muñoz's first international cap for Mexico was in a friendly match against Ecuador on 27 October 2004. Muñoz was the second-choice goalkeeper at both the 2004 Copa América and the 2005 Confederations Cup. Muñoz was the starting goalkeeper during the 2005 CONCACAF Gold Cup. Coach Ricardo La Volpe included him in the preliminary squad for the 2006 World Cup, but he did not make the final 23-man list. Muñoz had also been called up as a backup goalkeeper by Hugo Sánchez and Sven-Göran Eriksson.

Five years after his last call up and eight years after his last cap, Muñoz was selected by coach José Manuel de la Torre to Mexico's 2013 Gold Cup squad. On 14 July 2013, he was the starting goalkeeper for Mexico's final group stage match against Martinique, which Mexico won 3–1. During the match, Muñoz failed to save a penalty-kick from Kévin Parsemain. Later that year, after Miguel Herrera took over as national team coach, Muñoz was named the starting goalkeeper for the 2014 World Cup qualification playoff matches against New Zealand. He played in both matches as Mexico won the playoff 9–3 on aggregate. He did not make the final 23-man squad for the 2014 World Cup.

In June 2015 Muñoz was named in Mexico's squad participating in the CONCACAF Gold Cup, being handed the number 1 jersey, instead of the number 23 he traditionally wears (which was instead given to José Juan Vázquez). In October 2015, Muñoz was named in Mexico's squad for the 2015 CONCACAF Cup.

== Outside football ==
=== Personal life ===
Muñoz is the cousin of fellow goalkeeper Carlos Felipe Rodríguez. And also is the brother of the professional football player, José Roberto Muñoz. Muñoz has stated that had he not decided on playing professional football he would have played basketball or American football.

On 3 June 2012, while driving his Honda Odyssey through the highway that connects Mexico City with Guadalajara, Muñoz lost control of his vehicle and flipped it on to its roof. He was heading to Morelia, Michoacán at around 7:00 p.m. with his wife Verónica (née Castro Alfaro) and two kids, Héctor and Zafiro.

All of them were taken to Ángeles del Pedregal hospital by helicopter – the same hospital where Salvador Cabañas, a former Club América player, was treated after being shot in the head. Apparently, the harsh rainfall in the area caused Muñoz to lose control of his vehicle. Moreover, according to reports by the Mexican Red Cross, Muñoz suffered from traumatic brain injury but was "stable and conscious."

Originally, it was reported that Muñoz's health condition was serious, but had improved as he received medical attention. It was later stated that his head wound was not life-threatening, nor would it affect his playing career. Muñoz only suffered a head wound and never lost consciousness of what had happened. He later revealed that he had suffered a broken finger. In an interview Moi said, "If God kept me alive, it's because I will do something big." Then in Clausura 2013 Final against La Maquina he scored the tying goal.

Miguel Herrera, manager of Club América, stated in a press conference what Muñoz had personally told him:

I am very well. Fortunately, the doctors discarded any head fractures, and I am now boarding the helicopter and heading to Ángeles del Pedregal (the hospital). I will recover. Wait on me, Miguel.

— Moisés Muñoz

=== Media ===
In 2015, Muñoz made an appearance on the Mexican telenovela La vecina. Muñoz was an analyst for Fox Sports during the 2018 FIFA World Cup.

== Career statistics ==
=== International ===
As of match played 14 July 2017

National team	Year	Apps	Goals
Mexico	2004	4	0
Mexico	2005	4	0
Mexico	2013	2 (Note: Moisés Muñoz played a match against Martinique in 2013, however, this team is not recognized by FIFA, so their matches are not statistically valid.)	0
Mexico	2014	2	0
Mexico	2015	3	0
Mexico	2016	1	0
Mexico	2017	2	0
Total		18	0

== Honours ==
Morelia

- Mexican Primera División: Invierno 2000

América

- Liga MX: Clausura 2013, Apertura 2014
- CONCACAF Champions League: 2014–15, 2015–16

Mexico

- CONCACAF Gold Cup: 2015
- CONCACAF Cup: 2015
