= Rubén Duarte (Mexican footballer) =

Mexican footballer and manager (born 1967)

Personal information
- Full name: Rubén Duarte Casillas
- Date of birth: 1 April 1967 (age 59)
- Place of birth: Guanajuato, Guanajuato
- Height: 1.74 m (5 ft 8 1/2 in)
- Position: Defender

Senior career*
Years	Team	Apps	(Gls)
1990–1991	Atlas		

Managerial career
- 2007–2008: Atlas (Assistant)
- 2008–2009: Académicos
- 2010–2014: Atlas Reserves and Academy
- 2015: Académicos
- 2016: Inter Playa (Assistant)
- 2017–2018: Santos Laguna Reserves and Academy
- 2018–2019: Santos Laguna (Assistant)
- 2019: Santos Laguna (Interim)
- 2019-2020: Atlas (Assistant)
- 2020: Atlas (Interim)
- 2021–2024: Sinaloa (Assistant)
- 2024: Aucas (Assistant)
- * Club domestic league appearances and goals

Rubén Duarte Casillas (born 1 April 1967) is a Mexican football manager and former player.
