= Guillermo Vázquez (footballer) =

Mexican footballer and manager (born 1967)

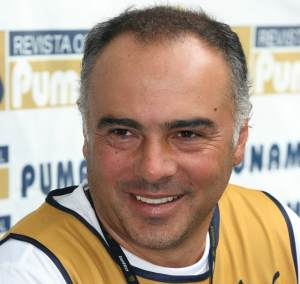
- Vázquez in a press conference

Personal information
- Full name: Guillermo Alejandro Vázquez Herrera
- Date of birth: May 25, 1967 (age 59)
- Place of birth: Mexico City, Mexico
- Position: Midfielder

Senior career*
Years	Team	Apps	(Gls)
1984–1990	UNAM	153	(22)
1990–1991	Tecos	35	(6)
1991–1992	Monterrey	23	(1)
1992–1994	Tecos	41	(2)
1994–1996	Toros Neza	47	(5)
1997	Atlas	1	(0)
1997–1998	Toros Neza	47	(8)
1998–1999	Pachuca	23	(2)

International career
1988–1991	Mexico	4	(0)

Managerial career
- 2006–2010: UNAM (assistant)
- 2006: UNAM (caretaker)
- 2010–2012: UNAM
- 2012–2013: Cruz Azul
- 2014–2016: UNAM
- 2017–2018: Veracruz
- 2018–2019: Necaxa
- 2020: Atlético San Luis
- 2021: Necaxa
- 2023: Cruz Azul (assistant)
- * Club domestic league appearances and goals

Guillermo Alejandro Vázquez Herrera (born May 25, 1967) is a Mexican former professional footballer and manager.

Vázquez debuted for Pumas UNAM during the 1984–85 season. He has also played for Tecos, Monterrey, Toros Neza and Pachuca. He was an experienced midfielder who ensured a calm and controlled midfield.

== Management career ==
Vázquez began as an interim coach for Pumas UNAM after Miguel España was sacked. Vázquez coached the last five matches of the Clausura 2006 with two victories, two draws, and one loss. For the Apertura 2006 Pumas UNAM hired Ricardo Ferretti and Vázquez became his assistant coach.

In July 2010, when Ricardo Ferretti left Pumas for Tigres de la UANL, Vázquez was given the head coach position.

== Managerial statistics ==
=== Managerial statistics ===
As of June 17, 2026

Team	Nat	From	To	Record							
Team	Nat	From	To	G	W	D	L	GF	GA	GD	Win %
Pumas UNAM	(Mexico)	July 1, 2010	June 30, 2012	78	31	23	24	94	91	+3	39.74
Cruz Azul	(Mexico)	July 1, 2012	December 31, 2013	68	32	21	15	101	67	+34	47.06
Pumas UNAM	(Mexico)	August 18, 2014	May 26, 2016	86	39	19	28	138	112	+26	45.35
Veracruz	(Mexico)	December 1, 2017	August 14, 2018	26	7	5	14	24	42	−18	26.92
Necaxa	(Mexico)	December 3, 2018	December 9, 2019	42	18	10	14	67	55	+12	42.86
Atlético San Luis	(Mexico)	January 1, 2020	October 30, 2020	27	6	5	16	28	49	−21	22.22
Necaxa	(Mexico)	March 19, 2021	September 25, 2021	16	6	1	9	17	22	−5	37.50
Total				343	139	84	120	469	438	+31	40.52

== Honours ==
=== Player ===
UNAM

- CONCACAF Champions' Cup: 1989

Monterrey

- Copa México: 1991–92

UAG

- Mexican Primera División: 1993–94

=== Manager ===
UNAM

- Mexican Primera División: Clausura 2011

Cruz Azul

- Copa MX: Clausura 2013

Individual

- Best Coach of the tournament: Clausura 2011
