= 2012–13 Club León season =

León
2012–13 season
- Chairman: Jesús Martínez Patiño
- Manager: Gustavo Matosas
- Stadium: Estadio León
- Apertura 2012: 3rd Final Phase semi-finals
- Clausura 2013: 15th
- Copa MX (Apertura): Group stage
- Copa Libertadores: First stage
- Top goalscorer: League: Apertura: Nelson Sebastián Maz (9); Clausura: Matías Britos (6); All: Matías Britos (16)
- Highest home attendance: Apertura: 25,595 vs América (September 14, 2012); Clausura: 26,495 vs Cruz Azul (February 2, 2013)
- Lowest home attendance: Apertura: 20,710 vs Chiapas (October 26, 2012); Clausura: 21,288 vs Atlante (April 27, 2013)
Home colours	Away colours

The 2012–13 León season was the 66th professional season of Mexico's top-flight football league. The season is split into two tournaments—the Torneo Apertura and the Torneo Clausura—each with identical formats and each contested by the same eighteen teams. Tijuana began their season on July 21, 2012 against Querétaro, León played their most home games on Saturday at 8:06pm local time. This was León first season in Mexican top-flight league since the Verano 2002 after defeating Correcaminos UAT in the promotion final. León qualified third to the final phase and was eliminated by Tijuana in the semi-finals, León did not qualify to the final phase in the Clausura tournament.

== Torneo Apertura ==
=== Squad ===
Note: Flags indicate national team as defined under FIFA eligibility rules; some limited exceptions apply. Players may hold more than one non-FIFA nationality.

No.	Pos.	Nation	Player
1	MF	COL	Hernán Burbano
3	DF	ARG	Javier Muñoz Mustafá
4	DF	MEX	Óscar Mascorro
5	DF	MEX	Juan Carlos Pineda
7	DF	MEX	Edwin Hernández
8	MF	MEX	Édgar Mejía
9	FW	URU	Matías Britos
10	MF	MEX	Luis Montes
11	FW	MEX	Luis Nieves
12	MF	MEX	Juan Carlos Rojas
15	MF	MEX	Edwin Santibáñez
16	GK	MEX	Christian Martínez
17	DF	MEX	Saúl Villalobos
18	FW	MEX	José Fernando Torres
19	DF	MEX	Jonny Magallón
20	MF	COL	Eisner Loboa

No.	Pos.	Nation	Player
21	DF	MEX	Luis Antonio Delgado
22	FW	URU	Nelson Sebastián Maz
23	MF	MEX	Juan Vázquez
24	MF	MEX	José de Jesús Pozos
25	GK	MEX	William Yarbrough
26	MF	MEX	Julio Ceja
27	MF	MEX	Carlos Peña
28	MF	MEX	Juan José Calderón
29	MF	MEX	Aldo Rocha
30	MF	MEX	Édgar Pacheco
31	GK	MEX	Édgar Hernández
32	MF	MEX	Raúl Maldonado
33	FW	MEX	Othoniel Arce
34	DF	MEX	Arturo Ortiz
35	DF	MEX	Ignacio González

=== Regular season ===
Win Draw Loss

==== Apertura 2012 results ====
July 21, 2012 Round 1	Querétaro	0 – 2	León	Querétaro, Querétaro
17:00	Cortés (yellow card) 45+'; Vera (yellow card) 56'; Gustavino (yellow card) 63'; Jiménez (red card) 89'	Report	Burbano 3' (pen.), (yellow card) 30'; González (red card) 42'; Maz (yellow card) 57'; Mascorro (yellow card) 82'; Edwin Hernández 90+1'	Stadium: Estadio Corregidora; Referee: José Alfredo Peñaloza

July 27, 2012 Round 2	León	4 – 0	Tijuana	León, Guanajuato
21:30	Maz (yellow card) 27'; Peña 31', 64'; Montes 60'; Burbano 64' (pen.); Lobos (yellow card) 72'	Report	Saucedo (yellow card) 29'; Gandolfi (yellow card) 49'; Aguilar (yellow card) 51'; Arce (yellow card) 59' (red card) 73'; Leandro (yellow card) 59'	Stadium: Estadio León; Referee: Fernando Guerrero

August 5, 2012 Round 3	Toluca	2 – 1	León	Toluca, Estado de Mexico
12:00	Lucas Silva 15'; Rodríguez (yellow card) 24'; Cabrera (yellow card) 28'; Sinha 38'; Novaretti (yellow card) 88'	Report	Loboa 45+'	Stadium: Estadio Nemesio Díez; Attendance: 18,021; Referee: Jorge Antonio Pérez

August 10, 2012 Round 4	León	3 – 0	Santos Laguna	León, Guanajuato
20:30	González 35'; Burbano (yellow card) 67'; Maz 75'; Peña 85'	Report	Gómez (yellow card) 13'; Sánchez (yellow card) 51'; Crosas (yellow card) 79'; Baloy (yellow card) 84'	Stadium: Estadio León; Attendance: 23,777; Referee: Óscar Macias

August 17, 2012 Round 5	Cruz Azul	1 – 1	León	Mexico City
21:30	Perea (yellow card) 4'; Vela (yellow card) 47'; Barrera 73', (yellow card) 74'; A. Castro (yellow card) 75'	Report	Vázauez (yellow card) 3'; Hernández (yellow card) 31'; Montes (yellow card) 45+', (goal) 70'; Matosas (red card) 90+1' (manager)	Stadium: Estadio Azul; Attendance: 22,877; Referee: Erim Ramírez

August 24, 2012 Round 6	León	1 – 3	Morelia	León, Guanajuato
20:30	Loboa (yellow card) 46'; Britos 48'; Magallón (yellow card) 86'	Report	Rojas 17', 78', (yellow card) 79'; Huiqui 26'; Pérez (yellow card) 39'; Ramírez (yellow card) 39'; Álvarez (yellow card) 50' (yellow-red card) 60'	Stadium: Estadio León; Attendance: 23,402; Referee: Jorge Isaac Rojas

September 1, 2012 Round 7	San Luis	0 – 2	León	San Luis Potosí, San Luis Potosí
21:00	Paredes (yellow card) 85'	Report	Loboa 6'; Britos 76'	Stadium: Estadio Alfonso Lastras; Attendance: 11,554; Referee: Francisco Chacón

September 14, 2012 Round 8	León	1 – 2	Guadalajara	León, Guanajuato
21:30	Montes (yellow card) 10'; Vázquez 75' (pen.), (yellow card) 90+1'; Magallón (red card) 79'; Peña (yellow card) 85'	Report	Sánchez (yellow card) 8'; Báez (red card) 32'; Araujo (yellow card) 52'; Enriquez 82'; Esparza (yellow card) 65'; Álvarez (yellow card) 73'; Márquez 90+2'	Stadium: Estadio León; Attendance: 25,595; Referee: Roberto García Orozco

September 21, 2012 Round 9	Puebla	1 – 1	León	Puebla, Puebla
19:30	Dimayuga (yellow card) 1'; Abelairas (yellow card) 44', (goal) 66'; Chávez (yellow card) 77'	Report	Maz 27'; González (yellow card) 36'; Montes (yellow card) 68'	Stadium: Estadio Cuauhtémoc; Attendance: 10,128; Referee: José Alfredo Peñaloza

September 28, 2012 Round 10	León	2 – 0	Monterrey	León, Guanajuato
21:30	Montes (yellow card) 43', (goal) 57'; Peña (yellow card) 44'; Burbano 61'	Report	Pérez (yellow card) 4'; Cardozo (yellow card) 42'; Basanta (yellow card) 54'; Reyna (yellow card) 58'; Meza (yellow card) 69'	Stadium: Estadio León; Attendance: 23,042; Referee: Miguel Ángel Flores

October 3, 2012 Round 11	León	2 – 1	UNAM	León, Guanajuato
20:30	Peña 45+2'; Hernández (yellow card) 50'; Delgado (yellow card) 50'; Maz 65'	Report	Chiapas (yellow card) 7'; Velarde (yellow card) 11'; Herrera 44'; Verón (yellow card) 48'; A. Palacios (yellow card) 76'; Bravo (yellow card) 90'	Stadium: Estadio León; Attendance: 25,096; Referee: Fernando Guerrero

October 6, 2012 Round 12	Pachuca	1 – 1	León	Pachuca, Hidalgo
19:00	Meráz 60'; Hernández (yellow card) 80' (yellow-red card) 90+2'	Report	Britos 38'; Peña (yellow card) 57'; Delgado (yellow card) 74'	Stadium: Estadio Hidalgo; Attendance: 14,969; Referee: César Arturo Ramos

October 13, 2012 Round 13	León	2 – 0	UANL	León, Guanajuato
19:00	Britos 1', (yellow card) 31'; Maz 35' (pen.); Burbano (yellow card) 44'	Report	Salcido (yellow card) 31'; Viniegra (yellow card) 33'; Álvarez (yellow card) 66'	Stadium: Estadio León; Attendance: 22,983; Referee: Erim Ramírez

October 20, 2012 Round 14	América	2 – 1	León	Mexico City
17:00	Molina (yellow card) 39'; Aldrete (yellow card) 52'; Montenegro (yellow card) 75'; Bermúdez 77'; Medina (yellow card) 84'; Benítez 86'	Report	Maz 47'; Peña (yellow card) 84'	Stadium: Estadio Azteca; Attendance: 41,346; Referee: Marco Antonio Rodríguez

October 26, 2012 Round 15	León	4 – 1	Chiapas	León, Guanajuato
21:15	Britos 5'; Vázquez (red card) 13'; Montes 28'; Burbano 51'; Pineda (yellow card) 52'; Peña 79'; González (yellow card) 82'	Report	Corral (yellow card) 17'; Martínez (red card) 20'; Rey 26' (pen.); Arizala (yellow card) 33' (yellow-red card) 84'; Andrade (yellow card) 78'	Stadium: Estadio León; Attendance: 20,710; Referee: Jorge Antonio Pérez

November 4, 2012 Round 16	Atlante	2 – 3	León	Cancún, Quintana Roo
18:00	O. Martínez (yellow card) 23' (yellow-red card) 90+3'; Maidana 53', (yellow card) 57'; Amione (yellow card) 75' (yellow-red card) 90+4'; Calvo (yellow card) 75'; Paredes 90'	Report	Maz 1', 30', (yellow card) 72'; González (yellow card) 45+1'; Peña 55'; Martínez (yellow card) 81'	Stadium: Estadio Andrés Quintana Roo; Attendance: 6,850; Referee: Miguel Ángel Flores

November 9, 2012 Round 17	León	3 – 1	Atlas	León, Guanajuato
21:30	Loboa 15'; Delgado (yellow card) 22'; Britos (yellow card) 31', (goal) 33'; Maz 59' (pen.); Nieves (yellow card) 87'	Report	Erpen (yellow card) 19'; Robles (yellow card) 52'; Santos (yellow card) 54'; Cufré (yellow card) 60'; Mancilla 76'	Stadium: Estadio León; Attendance: 35,000+ Referee: Roberto García Orozco

==== Final phase ====
November 14, 2012 Quarter-finals	Cruz Azul	2 – 1	León	Benito Juárez, Mexico City
19:00	Pereira (yellow card) 15'; Flores 16'; A. Castro (yellow card) 30'; Torrado (yellow card) 41'; I. Castro (yellow card) 47'; Pavone 58'	Report	González (yellow card) 18'; Magallón (yellow card) 21'; Maz 55'	Stadium: Estadio Azul; Attendance: 19,220; Referee: Ricardo Arellano

November 17, 2012 Quarter-finals	León	3 – 0	Cruz Azul	León, Guanajuato
19:00	Britos 9', 32'; Maz (yellow card) 19'; Peña (yellow card) 21'; Montes (yellow card) 61'; González (yellow card) 68'; Martínez (yellow card) 77'; Delgado 86'	Report	Torrado (yellow card) 19'; Vela (yellow card) 41'; Aquino (yellow card) 58'; Pavone (yellow card) 68' (yellow-red card) 79'; Giménez (yellow card) 71'	Stadium: Estadio León; Attendance: 24,226; Referee: Marco Antonio Rodríguez

León advanced 4–2 on aggregate

November 22, 2012 Semi-finals	León	2 – 0	Tijuana	León, Guanajuato
21:06	Britos (yellow card) 14'; Arce 55'; Peña 57'; Burbano (yellow card) 80'; Muñoz Mustafá (yellow card) 90'	Report	Corona (yellow card) 24'; Moreno (yellow card) 28'; Riascos (yellow card) 37'; Pellerano (yellow card) 49'	Stadium: Estadio León; Attendance: 24,808; Referee: Francisco Chacón

November 25, 2012 Semi-finals	Tijuana	3 – 0	León	Tijuana, Baja California
16:30	Pellerano (yellow card) 22'; Aguilar (yellow card) 41'; Martínez 43'; Riascos 68'; Castillo (yellow card) 71'; Ruiz 90', (yellow card) 90'	Report	Rojas (yellow card) 12'; González (yellow card) 45'; Burbano (yellow card) 71'	Stadium: Estadio Caliente; Attendance: 22,333; Referee: Marco Antonio Rodríguez

Tijuana advanced 3–2 on aggregate

=== Goalscorers ===
==== Regular season ====
Position	Nation	Name	Goals scored
1.	(Uruguay)	Nelson Sebastián Maz	8
2.	(Uruguay)	Matías Britos	6
2.	(Mexico)	Carlos Alberto Peña	6
4.	(Colombia)	Hernán Burbano	4
4.	(Mexico)	Luis Montes	4
6.	(Colombia)	Eisner Iván Loboa	3
7.	(Mexico)	Juan Ignacio González	1
7.	(Mexico)	Edwin William Hernández	1
7.	(Mexico)	José Juan Vázquez	1
TOTAL			34

==== Final phase ====
Position	Nation	Name	Goals scored
1.	(Uruguay)	Matías Britos	2
2.	(Uruguay)	Nelson Sebastián Maz	1
2.	(Mexico)	Othoniel Arce	1
2.	(Mexico)	Luis Antonio Delgado	1
2.	(Mexico)	Carlos Alberto Peña	1
TOTAL			6

=== Results ===
==== Results summary ====
Overall								Home						Away					
Pld	W	D	L	GF	GA	GD	Pts	W	D	L	GF	GA	GD	W	D	L	GF	GA	GD
17	10	3	4	34	17	+17	33	7	0	2	22	8	+14	3	3	2	12	9	+3

Last updated: 10 November 2012.
Source: Apertura 2012 results

==== Results by round ====
Round	1	2	3	4	5	6	7	8	9	10	11	12	13	14	15	16	17
Ground	A	H	A	H	A	H	A	H	A	H	H	A	H	A	H	A	H
Result	W	W	L	W	D	L	W	L	D	W	W	D	W	L	W	W	W
Position	3	1	4	2	2	5	3	3	4	3	3	3	3	3	3	2	3

Updated to match(es) played on 11 November 2012. Source: Apertura 2012 results and mediotiempo.com
A = Away; H = Home; W = Win; D = Draw; L = Loss

== Copa MX ==
=== Group stage ===
Win Draw Loss

==== Apertura results ====
July 24, 2012 1	Dorados	2 – 1	León	Culiacán, Sinaloa
20:00	López (yellow card) 20'; Blanco 58'; Mena 68'; Güemez (yellow card) 90+2'	Report	Delgado (yellow card) 33'; González (yellow card) 68'; Britos 84'; Nieves (yellow card) 90+2'	Stadium: Estadio Banorte; Referee: Mauricio Martínez

July 31, 2012 2	León	4 – 0	Dorados	León, Guanajuato
19:00	Calderón 18', (yellow card) 57'; Vázquez (yellow card) 40', (goal) 70'; Pacheco (yellow card) 49'; González 80'; Nieves 88'	Report	Ramírez (yellow card) 30'; Osuna (yellow card) 36'; Frausto (yellow card) 38'; Castro (yellow card) 47'; Ruiz (red card) 54'	Stadium: Estadio León; Referee: Miguel Ángel Ortega

August 7, 2012 3	León	1 – 1	Estudiantes Tecos	León, Guanajuato
19:00	Martínez 14'; Pineda (yellow card) 41'	Report	Quintero (yellow card) 8'; Alatorre (yellow card) 16'; Martiñones (yellow card) 19', (goal) 32'; Aguayo (yellow card) 53' (yellow-red card) 54'; Morales (yellow card) 63'; Tinajero (yellow card) 90'	Stadium: Estadio León; Attendance: 17,311; Referee: Víctor Bisguerra

August 21, 2012 4	Estudiantes Tecos	0 – 3	León	Zapopan, Jalisco
19:00	Ramírez (red card) 69'	Report	Santibañez (yellow card) 43'; Arce 21', 54'; Pacheco 75' (pen.)	Stadium: Estadio Tres de Marzo; Attendance: 2,962; Referee: Roberto Ríos Jácome

August 28, 2012 5	León	2 – 2	Morelia	León, Guanajuato
17:00	Arce 29'; Britos 43'; Mascorro (yellow card) 50'; Calderón (yellow card) 63'	Report	Pedroza (yellow card) 43'; Rojas 47'; Sepúlveda 62'; Godinez (yellow card) 65'	Stadium: Estadio León; Attendance: 19,980; Referee: Miguel Ángel Chacón

September 18, 2012 6	Morelia	0 – 0	León	Morelia, Michoacán
21:00	Torres (yellow card) 54'; Silva (yellow card) 57'	Report	Calderón (red card) 20'; Ortiz (yellow card) 45'	Stadium: Estadio Morelos; Attendance: 8,109; Referee: Jorge Antonio Pérez

=== Goalscorers ===
Position	Nation	Name	Goals scored
1.	(Mexico)	Othoniel Arce	3
2.	(Uruguay)	Matías Britos	2
2.	(Mexico)	José Juan Vázquez	2
4.	(Mexico)	Juan José Calderón	1
4.	(Mexico)	Arturo Ortíz Martínez	1
4.	(Mexico)	Luis Humberto Nieves	1
4.	(Mexico)	Edgar Iván Pacheco	1
TOTAL			11

=== Results ===
==== Results by round ====
Round	1	2	3	4	5	6
Ground	A	H	H	A	H	A
Result	L	W	D	W	D	D
Position	4	2	2	2	2	3

Updated to match(es) played on 18 September 2012. Source: Apertura results and mediotiempo.com
A = Away; H = Home; W = Win; D = Draw; L = Loss

== Torneo Clausura ==
=== Squad ===
Note: Flags indicate national team as defined under FIFA eligibility rules; some limited exceptions apply. Players may hold more than one non-FIFA nationality.

No.	Pos.	Nation	Player
1	MF	COL	Hernán Burbano
3	DF	MEX	Rafael Márquez
4	DF	MEX	Óscar Mascorro
5	DF	MEX	Iván Pineda
7	DF	MEX	Edwin Hernández
8	FW	MEX	Nery Castillo
9	FW	URU	Matías Britos
10	MF	MEX	Luis Montes (vice-captain)
11	MF	MEX	Jorge Zataraín
12	DF	MEX	Juan Carlos Rojas
14	FW	COL	Yovanny Arrechea
15	MF	MEX	Edwin Santibáñez
16	GK	MEX	Christian Martínez

No.	Pos.	Nation	Player
19	DF	MEX	Jonny Magallón
20	MF	COL	Eisner Loboa
21	DF	MEX	Luis Antonio Delgado
22	FW	URU	Nelson Sebastián Maz (captain)
23	MF	MEX	José Juan Vázquez
25	GK	MEX	William Yarbrough
27	MF	MEX	Carlos Peña
28	MF	MEX	Édgar Pacheco
30	MF	MEX	Juan José Calderón
31	GK	MEX	Édgar Hernández
32	MF	MEX	Raúl Maldonado
33	FW	MEX	Othoniel Arce
35	DF	MEX	Ignacio González

=== Regular season ===
Win Draw Loss

==== Clausura 2013 results ====
January 5, 2013 Round 1	León	2 – 2	Querétaro	León, Guanajuato
20:06	Hernández 24'; Montes (yellow card) 48'; Britos 50', (yellow card) 85'; Pineda (yellow card) 81'	Report	Vázquez 36'; Pineda (yellow card) 58'; Pérez (yellow card) 83'; Escoto 89'	Stadium: Estadio León; Attendance: 25,031; Referee: Marco Antonio Rodríguez

January 12, 2013 Round 2	Tijuana	1 – 0	León	Tijuana, Baja California
17:00	Moreno 6'; Pellerano (yellow card) 22'; Castillo (yellow card) 27'; Riascos (yellow card) 38'; Arce (yellow card) 43'; Leandro (red card) 79'	Report	Santibañez (yellow card) 14'; Márquez (yellow card) 28'; Peña (red card) 67'; Zatarín (yellow card) 74'	Stadium: Estadio Caliente; Attendance: 22,233; Referee: Paul Delgadillo

January 18, 2013 Round 3	León	1 – 2	Toluca	León, Guanajuato
20:36	Maz (yellow card) 6'; Rojas (yellow card) 26'; Britos 36', (yellow card) 64'; Márquez (yellow card) 64'	Report	Báez (yellow card) 11'; Benítez 16'; Gamboa (yellow card) 59'; Tejada (yellow card) 63'; Lucas Silva 76'	Stadium: Estadio León; Attendance: 24,985; Referee: Luis Enrique Santander

January 25, 2013 Round 4	Santos Laguna	2 – 0	León	Torreón, Coahuila
21:30	Mares (yellow card) 4'; Salinas 17'; Peralta (yellow card) 42', (goal) 56'; Rodríguez (yellow card) 85'	Report	Mascorro (yellow card) 12'; Zataraín (yellow card) 26'; González (yellow card) 75'	Stadium: Estadio Corona; Attendance: 23,141; Referee: Miguel Ángel Flores

February 2, 2013 Round 5	León	2 – 2	Cruz Azul	León, Guanajuato
20:06	Montes 39', (yellow card) 41'; Britos (yellow card) 46'; Loboa (yellow card) 69'; González 75'; Vázquez (yellow card) 78'; Burbano (yellow card) 83'	Report	Pavone 7', 72'; Gutiérrez (yellow card) 69'	Stadium: Estadio León; Attendance: 26,495; Referee: Óscar Macias

February 8, 2013 Round 6	Morelia	1 – 0	León	Morelia, Michoacán
19:30	Santana 54' (pen.), (yellow card) 88'; Huiqui (yellow card) 72'; Álvarez (red card) 90+2'	Report	González (red card) 58'; Márquez (yellow card) 58'	Stadium: Estadio Morelos; Attendance: 16,530; Referee: Roberto García Orozco

February 16, 2013 Round 7	León	2 – 0	San Luis	León, Guanajuato
20:05	Hernández 13', (yellow card) 23'; Arrechea 62', (yellow card) 81'; Eparza (yellow card) 72'; Pineda (yellow card) 89'	Report	Arredondo (yellow card) 2'; Mendoza (yellow card) 2'; Velasco (yellow card) 38'; Zamora (yellow card) 86'	Stadium: Estadio León; Referee: Paul Delgadillo

February 24, 2013 Round 8	Guadalajara	2 – 1	León	Zapopan, Jalisco
17:00	Fabián 11', 79', (yellow card) 27'; Peráles (yellow card) 55'; Sánchez (yellow card) 87'; López (yellow card) 90'	Report	Britos (yellow card) 3', (goal) 61'; Hernández (yellow card) 62'; Vázquez (yellow card) 75'; Montes (yellow card) 80'; Burbano (yellow card) 85'; González (yellow card) 90+2'; Peña (yellow card) 90+5'	Stadium: Estadio Omnilife; Attendance: 38,706; Referee: Erim Ramírez

March 2, 2013 Round 9	León	0 – 1	Puebla	León, Guanajuato
20:06	Peña (yellow card) 28'; Delgado (yellow card) 73'	Report	González (yellow card) 8'; Beasley (yellow card) 25'; Hernández (yellow card) 37' de Buen 52'; Durán (yellow card) 71' (yellow-red card) 90+4'; Medina (yellow card) 90+4'	Stadium: Estadio León; Attendance: 26,123; Referee: Miguel Ángel Ayala

March 9, 2013 Round 10	Monterrey	2 – 1	León	Monterrey, Nuevo León
19:00	Zavala 21', 80', (yellow card) 76'; Suazo (yellow card) 84'; Meza (yellow card) 89'	Report	González (yellow card) 35'; Britos 35'; Márquez (yellow card) 50'; Montes (yellow card) 68'	Stadium: Estadio Tecnológico; Attendance: 33,355; Referee: Fernando Guerrero

March 17, 2013 Round 11	UNAM	0 – 0	León	Coyoacán, Mexico City
12:00	Van Rankin (yellow card) 5'; Velarde (yellow card) 41'	Report	González (yellow card) 31'; Montes (yellow card) 43'; Magallón (yellow card) 59'	Stadium: Estadio Olímpico Universitario; Attendance: 24,093; Referee: Jorge Isaac Rojas

March 30, 2013 Round 12	León	0 – 0	Pachuca	León, Guanajuato
20:05	Maz (red card) 76'; Montes (yellow card) 44' (red card) 83'; Márquez (yellow card) 82'; Castillo (yellow card) 88'	Report	H. Herrera (yellow card) 44' (red card) 50' da Silva (yellow card) 75'; Arreola (yellow card) 77'; Hurtado (yellow card) 89'	Stadium: Estadio León; Referee: Miguel Ángel Flores

April 6, 2013 Round 13	UANL	0 – 0	León	San Nicolás de los Garza, Nuevo León
19:00	Torres Nilo (yellow card) 61'; Danilinho (yellow card) 90+2'	Report	Burbano (yellow card) 82'	Stadium: Estadio Universitario; Attendance: 38,700; Referee: César Arturo Ramos

April 13, 2013 Round 14	León	1 – 1	América	León, Guanajuato
20:06	Britos 3' (pen.); Hernández (yellow card) 11'; Magallón (yellow card) 34'; Márquez (yellow card) 87'	Report	Mosquera (yellow card) 3'; Benítez 9'	Stadium: Estadio León; Attendance: 26,229; Referee: Jorge Antonio Pérez

April 10, 2013 Round 15	Chiapas	2 – 2	León	Tuxtla Gutiérrez, Chiapas
19:30	Esqueda (yellow card) 13'; Bedolla (yellow card) 37'; Jiménez 50'; Rey 58'; Andrade (yellow card) 89'	Report	Márquez (yellow card) 13'; González (yellow card) 27'; Peña 61'; Hernández 90+3'	Stadium: Estadio Victor Manuel Reyna; Attendance: 9,552; Referee: José Alfredo Peñaloza

April 27, 2013 Round 16	León	1 – 0	Atlante	León, Guanajuato
20:06	Márquez (yellow card) 41'; Pacheco 78'	Report	Venegas (yellow card) 34'; Villalpando (yellow card) 54'; Nápoles (yellow card) 57'	Stadium: Estadio León; Attendance: 21,288; Referee: Fabricio Morales

May 4, 2013 Round 17	Atlas	0 – 1	León	Guadalajara, Jalisco
21:00	Millar (yellow card) 22'; Erpen (yellow card) 38'; Razo (yellow card) 64'	Report	Britos 54'; Montes (yellow card) 80'	Stadium: Estadio Jalisco; Attendance: 33,951; Referee: Marco Antonio Rodríguez

León did not qualify to the Final Phase

=== Goalscorers ===
Position	Nation	Name	Goals scored
1.	(Argentina)	Matías Britos	6
2.	(Mexico)	Edwin William Hernández	3
3.	(Colombia)	Yovanny Arrechea	1
3.	(Mexico)	Juan Ignacio González	1
3.	(Mexico)	Luis Montes	1
3.	(Mexico)	Edgar Iván Pacheco	1
3.	(Mexico)	Carlos Peña	1
TOTAL			14

=== Results ===
==== Results summary ====
Overall								Home						Away					
Pld	W	D	L	GF	GA	GD	Pts	W	D	L	GF	GA	GD	W	D	L	GF	GA	GD
17	3	7	7	14	18	−4	16	2	4	2	9	8	+1	1	3	5	5	10	−5

Last updated: 4 May 2013.
Source: Clausura 2013 results

==== Results by round ====
Round	1	2	3	4	5	6	7	8	9	10	11	12	13	14	15	16	17
Ground	H	A	H	A	H	A	H	A	H	A	A	H	A	H	A	H	A
Result	D	L	L	L	D	L	W	L	L	L	D	D	D	D	D	W	W
Position	8	12	14	17	17	17	16	16	16	17	17	15	17	18	17	16	15

Updated to match(es) played on 5 May 2013. Source: Clausura 2013 results and mediotiempo.com
A = Away; H = Home; W = Win; D = Draw; L = Loss

== Copa Libertadores ==
Win Draw Loss

=== First stage ===
January 22, 2013 First leg	León (Mexico)	1 – 1	(Chile) Iquique	León, Mexico
19:45 UTC−6	Maz 87'	Report	Díaz 3'; Zenteno (yellow card) 20'; Brito (yellow card) 47'	Stadium: Estadio León; Referee: Héber Lopes (Brazil)

January 29, 2013 Second leg	Iquique (Chile)	1 – 1 (4 – 2 p)	(Mexico) León	Iquique, Chile
22:00 UTC−3	Monje (yellow card) 5'; Díaz 58' (pen.); Brito (yellow card) 69'	Report	Vázquez (yellow card) 13'; Peña (yellow card) 41'; Arrechea 47'; Montes (yellow card) 48'; Martínez (yellow card) 57'; Calderón (yellow card) 87' (yellow-red card) 90'; Maz (yellow card) 90+2'	Stadium: Estadio Tierra de Campeones; Referee: Antonio Arias (Paraguay)
	Penalties
	Zenteno (penalty scored); Villalobos (penalty scored); Ereros (penalty scored); Grabinski (penalty missed); Díaz (penalty scored)		(penalty missed) Burbano; (penalty missed) Montes; (penalty scored) Vázquez; (penalty scored) Arrechea

Iquique advanced on penalties.

=== Goalscorers ===
Position	Nation	Name	Goals scored
1.	(Colombia)	Yovanny Arrechea	1
1.	(Uruguay)	Nelson Sebastián Maz	1
TOTAL			2

== Competitions ==
=== Copa León ===
Semi-finals
28 June 2012
Pumas UNAM	0 (3)
Pachuca	0 (2)
28 June 2012
León	2
Cruz Azul	0

Final
30 June 2012
León	4
Pumas UNAM	3
Third place
30 June 2012
Pachuca	1 (3)
Cruz Azul	1 (2)

=== Copa Campeón de Campeones ===
8 July 2012
17:00

León	2–0	Santos Laguna
Maz 59', 69'	Report

The Home Depot Center, Carson, California

=== Copa Pachuca ===
Semi-finals
12 July 2012
Jaguares	0
León	2
12 July 2012
Pachuca	1
Puebla	0

Final
14 July 2012
Pachuca	1
León	3
Third place
14 July 2012
Jaguares	1
Puebla	2

=== Copa Frisco ===
9 September 2012
18:30

FC Dallas	3–3	León
John 25'; Jackson 48'; Warshaw 83'	Report	Pineda 11'; Maz 53'; Peña 64'
Penalties
Benítez (penalty scored); Guarda (penalty scored); Warshaw (penalty scored)	3–4	Luis Montes (penalty scored); Vázquez (penalty scored); González (penalty scored); Maz (penalty scored)

FC Dallas Stadium, Frisco, Texas

=== Copa Telcel ===
Semi-finals
26 June 2013
Pachuca	2
Puebla	0
26 June 2013
León	3
O'Higgins	2

Final
29 June 2013
León	1 (4)
Pachuca	1 (3)
Third place
29 June 2013
Puebla	0
O'Higgins	2
