= Free Kick Masters =

International football competition

The Free Kick Masters is a skills-based international football competition featuring some of the world's top rated free kick takers competing against some of the world's top rated goalkeepers in a direct free kick shootout to declare the world's "Free Kick Master" and "Golden Goalkeeper". The competition has no affiliation with or ties to FIFA but is unique in the world of football as it is one of the only events that features star players involved in a direct competition against one and another.

== History of the event ==
The first Free Kick Master was first held in Marbella, Spain over a two-day period in December 2004. Developed by a team of individuals involved in international football, the event challenged the skills of participants by testing their accuracy and ability to make successful free kicks from distances of 18 meters, 21 meters, and 25 meters. Participants were allowed to choose their approach: from the left, right, or center, and were awarded points based on the number of attempts required to score a goal. Points were awarded for successful goals with a maximum of three attempts from each distance. The current champion is Rafael Márquez of FC Barcelona. t:

From 18 meters, 5 points were awarded for a score on the first attempt, 3 for a score on the second, and 2 on the third try.

From 21 meters, 7 points were awarded for a score on the first attempt, 4 for a score on the second, and 3 on the third try.

From 25 meters, 10 points were awarded for a score on the first attempt, 7 for a score on the second, and 5 if a player managed to score by the third try.

Goalpost hits were also awarded one point each.

At the end of the competition, SC Heerenveen player Ugur Yıldırım emerged as a surprise standout with near perfection, having amassed 25 points en route to claiming the title. Shanghai specialist Shen Si was near perfection himself, amassing an impressive 20 points. Benjamín rounded out the top three competitors with 12 points.

== 2004 Event Results ==
1st: Ugur Yıldırım (Heerenveen) – 25 points
2nd: Shen Si (Shanghai Zhongyuan) – 20 points
3rd: Benjamín (Real Betis) – 12 points
4th: Nastja Čeh (Club Brugge) – 10 points
5th: Zinedine Zidane (Real Madrid) – 8 points
6th: Hamilton Ricard (APOEL) – 8 points
7th: Orlando Engelaar (Racing Genk) – 6 points
8th: Constantin Gâlcă (Almería) – 1 point

A list of participants from the 2004 Event can be found at https://web.archive.org/web/20070928091642/http://www.freekickmasters.com/players.php

After the success of the event in 2004, the organizers did not conduct an event in either 2005 or 2006. According to the organizers, a 2006 event had been scheduled to take place in Los Angeles, but scheduling and entertainer conflicts led to its postponement.

== Free Kick Master 2007 ==
On 26 April 2007, at a joint news conference in Barcelona, Spain, the organizers of the Free Kick Masters announced that the competition would once again take place, and that Brazilian superstar Ronaldinho would be one of the primary participants.

In an interview at the conference, Ronaldinho downplayed his highly touted status as a player and free kick specialist stating: "There are some very good free kick takers, all those taking part will be good at it. I like David Beckham, Thierry Henry, Roberto Carlos, Rafael Márquez, Bernd Schneider, Deco... All of those players can shoot really well."

Free Kick Master 2007 was scheduled to take place on 22 December 2007 at Reliant Stadium in Houston, Texas, United States. The full list of competitors in the Event has yet to be announced, but there is speculation that Rafael Márquez and Roberto Carlos, among others, will challenge Ronaldinho for the title.

== Free Kick Masters 2008 ==
As a result of an unforeseen scheduling anomaly involving both the Liga de Fútbol Profesional (LFP) of Spain and the Lega Nazionale Professionisti of Italy, the producers of the Free Kick Masters event originally scheduled for 22 December 2007 at Houston's Reliant Stadium was moved to Saturday 5 July 2008 at the same stadium.

The LFP scheduled the last matches of 2007 on 22 and 23 December, later in the month than has been their custom. A similar move by the Lega Nazionale Professionisti provided conflicts for many of the world's top footballers who had previously agreed to participate in the Free Kick Masters 2007 event. As a result, 5 July 2008 was selected as the new date. The move was supposed to allow the players involved to fulfill their professional duties with their respective clubs in order to participate.

With a format similar to the National Basketball Association's Slam Dunk Contest and Major League Baseball's Home Run Derby, the Free Kick Masters is a skills-based international football competition. This free kick shootout is designed to declare the world's "Free Kick Master" and "Golden Goalkeeper". The last Free Kick Masters was a sold-out event held in Marbella, Spain broadcast to over 30 countries with an estimated 110 million viewers.

The player crowned "Free Kick Master" will receive $1 million in prize money, and the "Golden Goalkeeper" title winner will receive $500,000.

The free kickers who appeared in 2008 included Ronaldinho (Milan), Rafael Márquez, Lionel Messi (both of Barcelona), and Martín Palermo (Boca Juniors). Last minute withdrawals by headliners such as Alessandro Del Piero, Juninho, Fernando Torres, Deco, and Lukas Podolski significantly reduced the celebrity of the lineup. The list of goalkeepers included Francesco Toldo (Internazionale), Kasey Keller (Fulham), David James (Portsmouth), Vojislav Dragović (free agent), and Jorge Campos (retired from professional football at the time).

Other kickers included:

- Jared Borgetti
- Robert Pires (Villarreal)
- Dwayne de Rosario (Houston Dynamo)
- Subait Khater
- Javier Portillo
- Eddie Lewis (Derby County)
- Brad Davis (Houston Dynamo)
- Segundo Castillo (Red Star Belgrade/Everton)
- Jozy Altidore (Villarreal)
- Shen Si
- Sulley Muntari (Internazionale)
- Júlio Baptista (Roma)
- Romário

In the end, Rafael Márquez and David James were named the winners.

== Free Kick Master 2010 ==
Free Kick Master was to be held in Las Vegas in 2010 at the MGM Grand Garden Arena but was cancelled when MGM began facing Bankruptcy issues.

== See also ==
- Soccer Meets Darts
