= Vojislav Dragović =

Serbian footballer and sports agent

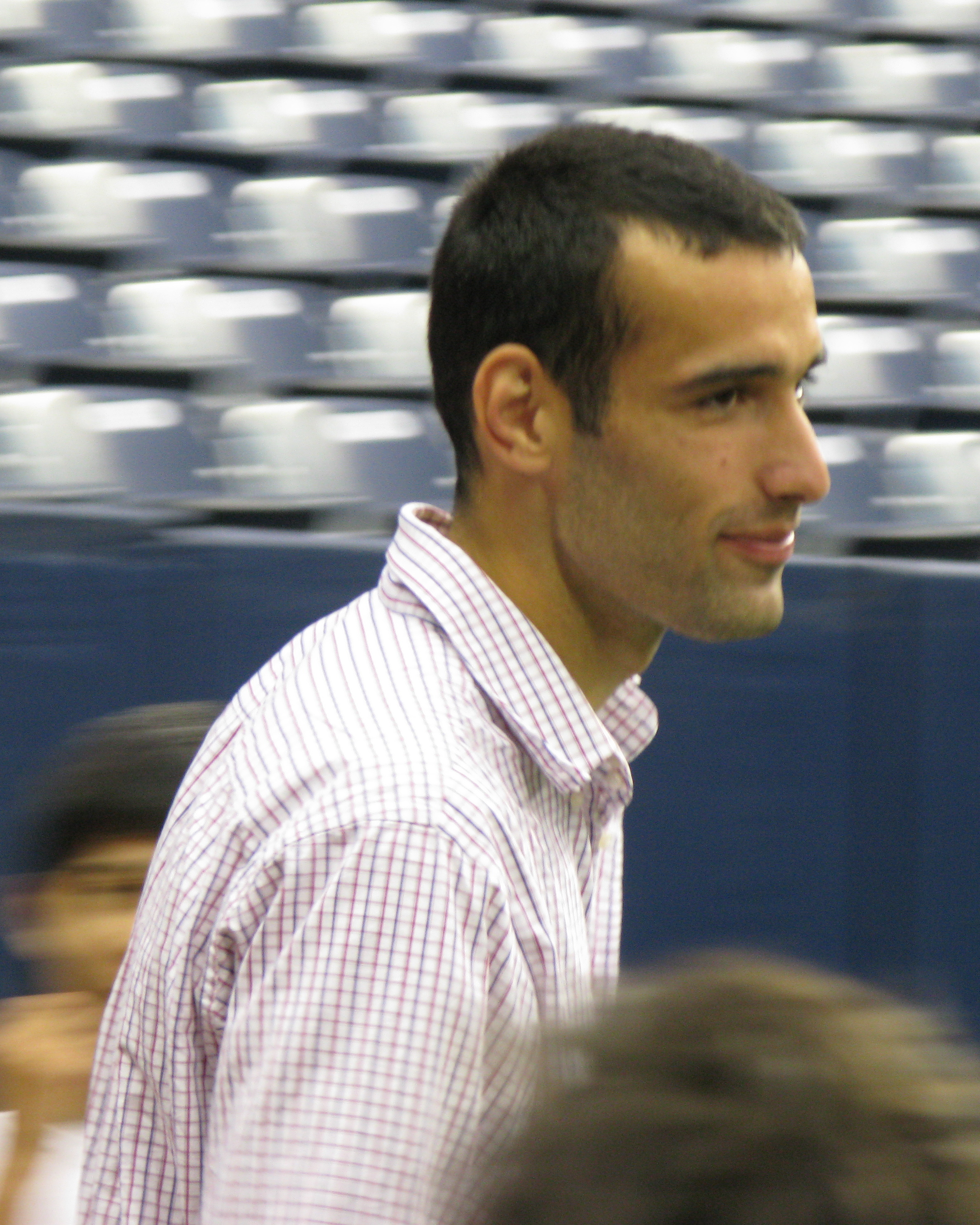
- Dragović before the Free Kick Masters in 2008

Personal information
- Full name: Vojislav Dragović
- Date of birth: 15 October 1982 (age 44)
- Place of birth: Belgrade, SR Serbia, SFR Yugoslavia
- Height: 1.98 m (6 ft 6 in)
- Position: Goalkeeper

Youth career
- Sinđelić Beograd
- Zemun

Senior career*
Years	Team	Apps	(Gls)
2001–2002	Zemun	0	(0)
2002	Chievo	0	(0)
2003–2004	Obilić	0	(0)
2005	Sarajevo	11	(0)
Total		11	(0)
- * Club domestic league appearances and goals

Vojislav Dragović (Serbian Cyrillic: Војислав Драговић; born 15 October 1982) is a Serbian sports agent and former professional footballer who played as a goalkeeper.

== Playing career ==
In February 2002, Dragović was transferred to Serie A club Chievo on a two-year contract. He later returned to his homeland and signed with Obilić in the summer of 2003. In January 2005, Dragović moved abroad for the second time and signed with Bosnian club Sarajevo, making 11 league appearances in the remainder of the season.

In August 2007, Dragović spent some time on trial at Portuguese club Belenenses, but failed to earn a contract. He subsequently took part during the Free Kick Masters in 2008.

== Post-playing career ==
In 2005, Dragović started working as a football agent and assisted in bringing Walter Zenga and Zdeněk Zeman to Red Star Belgrade. He was also involved in the transfers of Stephen Appiah to Vojvodina and Eric Djemba-Djemba to Partizan.

Outside football, Dragović composed songs for Tony Cetinski.

== Honours ==
Sarajevo

- Bosnia and Herzegovina Cup: 2004–05
