= Uğur Yıldırım =

Dutch footballer and coach

Personal information
- Date of birth: 8 May 1982 (age 44)
- Place of birth: Apeldoorn, Netherlands
- Height: 1.75 m (5 ft 9 in)
- Position: Winger

Youth career
- 1990–1998: Brink en Orden
- 1998–1999: Go Ahead Eagles

Senior career*
Years	Team	Apps	(Gls)
1999–2004	Go Ahead Eagles	119	(44)
2004–2007	Heerenveen	83	(12)
2007–2008	Gaziantepspor	18	(5)
2008	Sivasspor	12	(2)
2009–2010	Kasımpaşa	4	(0)
2010–2011	AGOVV	16	(1)
2012–2015	CSV Apeldoorn		
Total		252	(64)

International career
2005	Netherlands	1	(0)
- * Club domestic league appearances and goals

Uğur Yıldırım (Turkish pronunciation: [uːɾ jɯldɯˈɾɯm]; born 8 May 1982) is a Dutch football coach and former professional player. He especially impressed during his time with SC Heerenveen and became free kick world champion. After retiring, he began working as a coach at the Go Ahead Eagles youth academy.

He made one appearance for the Netherlands national team.

== Club career ==
A freekick specialist, Yıldırım progressed through the Go Ahead Eagles youth academy. In the 2003–04 season he scored six goals in an Eerste Divisie match against Cambuur. This unique feat drew attention of bigger clubs and Yıldırım signed a contract at Heerenveen, with whom he had an outstanding debut season. In 2004, Yıldırım won a free kick tournament held in Marbella, beating out players such as Zinedine Zidane.

In July 2007, he signed a three-year contract with Turkish Süper Lig club Gaziantepspor. During his time at the club, he scored three goals for his team. He subsequently moved to title challengers Sivasspor after claiming that Gaziantepspor had not paid his wages for several months. His time in Sivasspor was disappointing and he left after only six months on a free transfer. After his unsuccessful stay in Turkey, Yıldırım had several trials in 2008, but failed to impress with English clubs Blackburn Rovers, Plymouth Argyle and Watford. He then trialled with Azerbaijani club Neftçi Baku and Dutch side FC Zwolle. The result of this unsuccessful period of trials was eventually a contract with Kasımpaşa in January 2009 until the end of the season, where he was released in June 2009.

In August 2010 Yıldırım agreed to join Dutch Eerste Divisie side AGOVV, signing a one-year contract for the club from his native town. Afterwards, he began playing on amateur level with CSV Apeldoorn.

== International career ==
After Yıldırım took the decision on 22 January 2005 to represent the Netherlands internationally – after having to choose between the Netherlands and Turkey. He gained his only international cap on 9 February 2005 against England. In the 64th minute he came on as a substitute for Feyenoord-player Romeo Castelen, as the game ended in 0–0 draw. As the match against England was a friendly, Yıldırım could still opt to play for Turkey.

== Coaching career ==
After his playing career, Yıldırım began coaching teams in the Go Ahead Eagles youth academy while taking his coaching diploma. He also coached Vierde Klasse team TKA between 2017 and 2019. On 1 July 2020, he began coaching the Go Ahead Eagles U16 team.
