= Matías Britos =

Uruguayan footballer (born 1988)

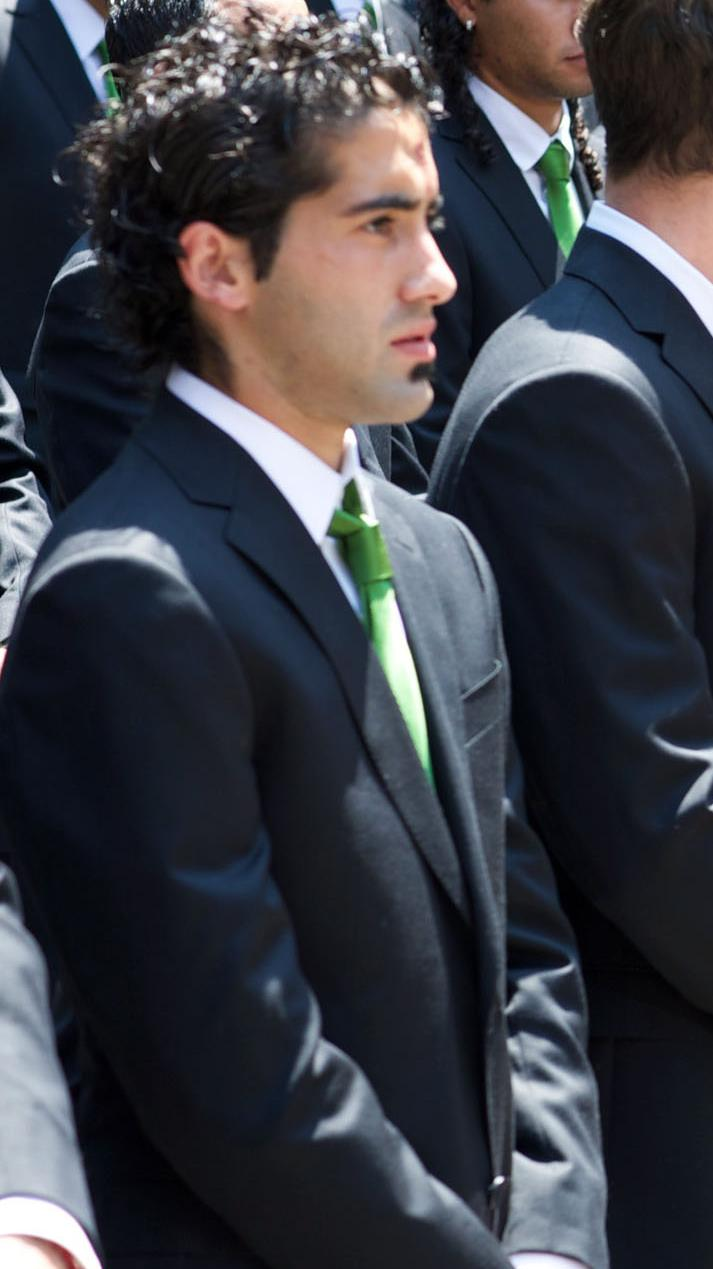

Personal information
- Full name: Matías Britos Cardoso
- Date of birth: 26 November 1988 (age 37)
- Place of birth: San Carlos, Uruguay
- Height: 1.71 m (5 ft 7 in)
- Position: Striker

Senior career*
Years	Team	Apps	(Gls)
2007–2008	Atenas	?	(69)
2009–2011	Juventud	?	(10)
2010	Atenas (loan)	14	(4)
2010–2011	Rampla Juniors (loan)	30	(7)
2011–2012	Defensor Sporting	25	(6)
2012–2014	León	69	(18)
2014–2017	UNAM	91	(26)
2017–2018	Al-Hilal	6	(1)
2018–2019	Querétaro	25	(0)
2019	Correcaminos UAT	10	(0)
2020–2021	Peñarol	25	(7)
2021–	Atenas		

International career
2011	Uruguay U-22	5	
- * Club domestic league appearances and goals as of 4 April 2021

Matías Britos Cardoso (born November 26, 1988), commonly known as Matías Britos, is a Uruguayan footballer who plays as a striker, most recently for Peñarol. He also holds Mexican citizenship.

== Club career ==
=== Al-Hilal ===
On 12 July 2017, Al-Hilal signed Matías Britos on a two-year contract. He made his debut for as a substitute for Abdullah Otayf in the 67th minute against Al-Fayha. On 21 October 2017, he scored his first goal against Al-Batin in the 62nde minute which gave his side a 2–1 win. He left for Querétaro F.C. in 2018.

== Career statistics ==
As of match played 9 November 2024

Appearances and goals by club, season and competition
Club	Season	League			Cup		Continental		Total	
Club	Season	Division	Apps	Goals	Apps	Goals	Apps	Goals	Apps	Goals
Juventud	2008–09	Uruguayan Primera División	?	6	0	0	—		?	6
Atenas (loan)	2009–10	Uruguayan Primera División	14	4	0	0	—		14	4
Rampla Juniors (loan)	2010–11	Uruguayan Primera División	30	7	0	0	—		30	7
Defensor Sporting	2011–12	Uruguayan Primera División	25	6	0	0	4	1	29	7
León	2012–13	Liga MX	35	14	5	2	1	0	41	16
León	2013–14	Liga MX	34	4	2	0	7	1	43	5
León	Total		69	18	7	2	8	1	84	21
UNAM	2014–15	Liga MX	22	5	6	1	—		28	6
UNAM	2015–16	Liga MX	37	11	2	0	8	1	47	12
UNAM	2016–17	Liga MX	32	10	0	0	2	1	34	11
UNAM	Total		91	26	8	1	10	2	109	29
Al-Hilal	2017–18	Saudi Professional League	6	1	0	0	2	0	8	1
Querétaro	2017–18	Liga MX	10	0	6	1	—		16	1
Querétaro	2018–19	Liga MX	15	0	3	0	—		18	0
Querétaro	Total		25	0	9	1	—		34	1
Correcaminos UAT	2019–20	Ascenso MX	10	6	2	0	—		12	6
Peñarol	2020	Uruguayan Primera División	25	7	0	0	5	1	30	8
Atenas	2021	Uruguayan Segunda División	21	8	—		—		21	8
Atenas	2022	Uruguayan Segunda División	25	7	—		—		25	7
Atenas	2023	Uruguayan Segunda División	31	5	—		—		31	5
Atenas	2024	Uruguayan Segunda División	27	2	—		—		27	2
Atenas	Total		104	22	—		—		104	22
Career totals			399	103	26	4	29	5	450	112

== International career ==
=== Under-22 ===
In 2011, he was named to participate in the Uruguay national football team under-22 squad for the 2011 Pan American Games.

== Honours ==
León

- Liga MX: Apertura 2013, Clausura 2014

Al-Hilal

- AFC Champions League Runners-up : 2017
