= Rafael Márquez =

Mexican footballer and manager (born 1979)

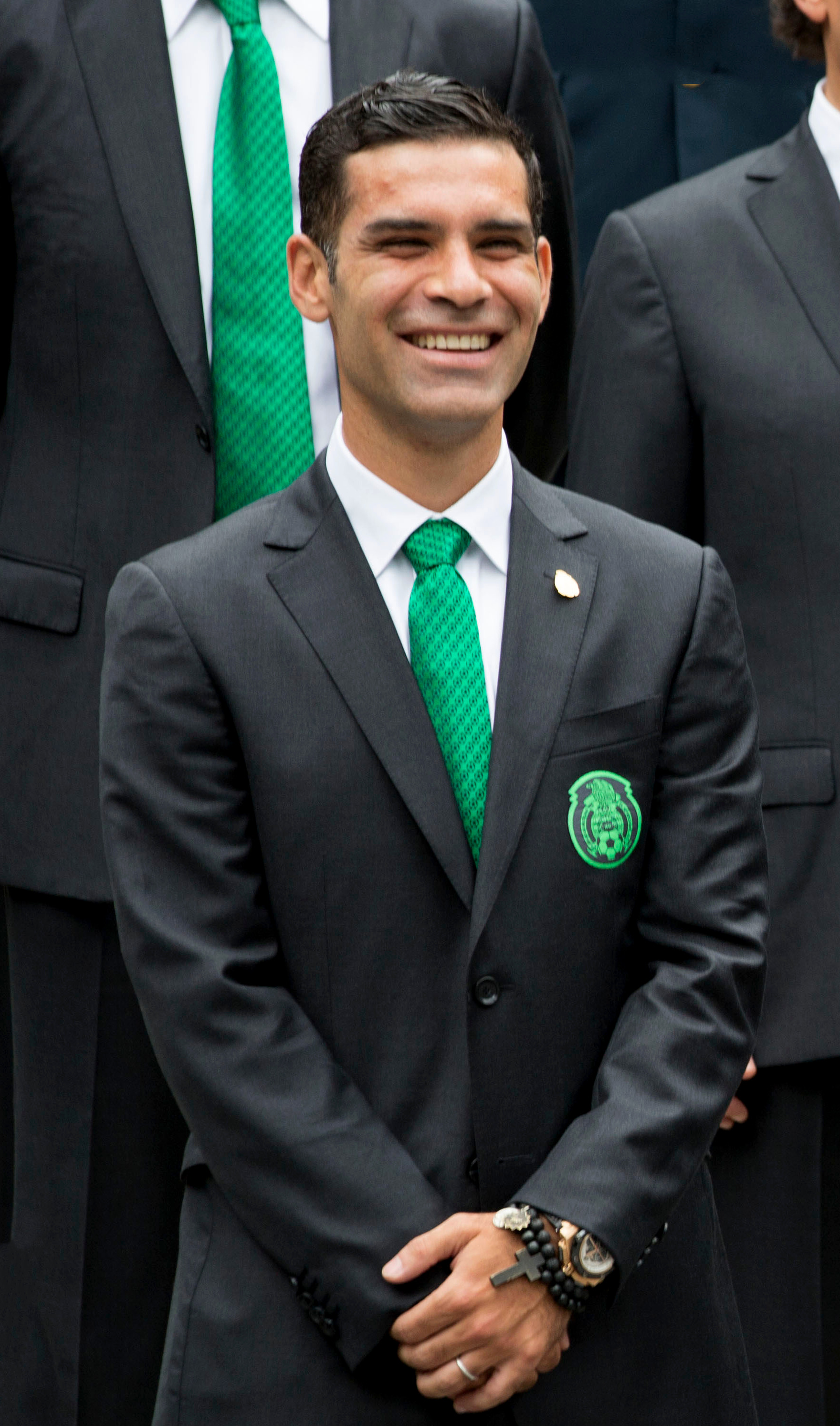
- Márquez in 2014

Personal information
- Full name: Rafael Márquez Álvarez
- Date of birth: 13 February 1979 (age 47)
- Place of birth: Zamora, Michoacán, Mexico
- Height: 1.84 m (6 ft 0 in)
- Positions: Centre-back; defensive midfielder

Team information
- Current team: Mexico (head coach)

Youth career
- 1992–1996: Atlas

Senior career*
| Years | Team | Apps | (Gls) |
| 1996–1999 | Atlas | 77 | (6) |
| 1999–2003 | Monaco | 89 | (5) |
| 2003–2010 | Barcelona | 163 | (9) |
| 2010–2012 | New York Red Bulls | 44 | (1) |
| 2012–2014 | León | 50 | (1) |
| 2014–2015 | Hellas Verona | 35 | (1) |
| 2016–2018 | Atlas | 58 | (1) |
| Total | | 516 | (23) |

International career
| 1997–1999 | Mexico U20 | 4 | (2) |
| 1997–2018 | Mexico | 147 | (17) |

Managerial career
- 2020–2021: Alcalá (U15)
- 2022–2024: Barcelona Atlètic
- 2024–2026: Mexico (assistant)
- 2026–: Mexico
Medal record
Men's football
Representing Mexico (as player)
FIFA Confederations Cup
| Winner | 1999 Mexico |
Copa América
| Runner-up | 2001 Colombia |
| Third place | 1999 Paraguay |
| Third place | 2007 Venezuela |
CONCACAF Gold Cup
| Winner | 2003 United States–Mexico |
| Winner | 2011 United States |
| Runner-up | 2007 United States |
CONCACAF Cup
| Winner | 2015 United States |
CONCACAF Pre-Olympic Tournament
| Third place | 2000 United States |
Lunar New Year Cup
| Winner | 1999 Hong Kong |
| Runner-up | 2000 Hong Kong |
U.S. Cup
| Winner | 1997 United States |
| Winner | 1999 United States |
Representing Mexico (as manager)
CONCACAF Gold Cup
| Winner | 2025 United States–Canada |
CONCACAF Nations League
| Winner | 2025 United States |
- * Club domestic league appearances and goals

Rafael Márquez Álvarez (Spanish: [rafaˈel ˈmaɾkes]; born 13 February 1979) is a Mexican football manager and former footballer who played as a defender. He is the head coach of the Mexico national team. Nicknamed El Káiser, he is regarded as the greatest defender in Mexico's history and one of the best Mexican players of all time.

Márquez began his career with Atlas in 1996, playing in over 70 games with the club before moving to France in 1999 with Monaco, where he won a Ligue 1 title. In 2003, Márquez joined Barcelona, becoming the first ever Mexican to represent the club. He would go on to play in over 240 games during seven seasons with the Blaugrana and win numerous honors, including four La Liga titles and two UEFA Champions League titles. In 2006, he became the first Mexican player to win the Champions League when Barcelona defeated Arsenal in the final. In 2010, Márquez joined Major League Soccer club New York Red Bulls. After being released from the club in 2012, he returned to his native Mexico, this time to play for León, captaining the team to back-to-back Liga MX titles in 2013 and 2014. Márquez then transferred to Hellas Verona of the Italian Serie A. He returned to his boyhood club Atlas in 2015, and announced his retirement from football in April 2018.

Márquez is the fourth most-capped player in the history of the Mexico national football team, earning 147 caps throughout his career. In 2018, he became only the fourth player to play for his national team in five consecutive editions of the FIFA World Cup, alongside compatriot Antonio Carbajal, Lothar Matthäus, and Gianluigi Buffon, appearing in the 2002, 2006, 2010, 2014, and 2018 tournaments. He is also the Mexican player with the most World Cup matches played with 19. With the national team, Márquez won the 1999 FIFA Confederations Cup, and the 2003 and 2011 editions of the CONCACAF Gold Cup.

== Club career ==
=== Atlas ===
Márquez began his career with Atlas, making his debut in October 1996 at only 17 years of age. Márquez rose to prominence while with Atlas, making 77 appearances for the team and being runner-up in the league, losing the final against Toluca on penalties during the Verano 1999 tournament.

=== Monaco ===
After playing the 1999 Copa América with Mexico, Márquez joined French club Monaco for a reported US$6 million. He made his debut on 14 August against Bastia. In his first season, Monaco won the Ligue 1 (then known as the French Division 1) title, with Márquez being named in the league's Team of the Season. He went on to play in 109 matches with Monaco over four seasons, winning the Coupe de la Ligue as well.

=== Barcelona ===
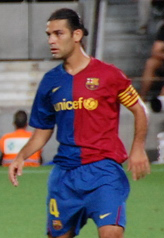
Márquez in 2009

In the summer of 2003, Márquez signed for Spanish club Barcelona. He made his debut in La Liga on 3 September 2003 against Sevilla, the match ending in a 1–1 draw. On 9 November, he scored his first goal for Barcelona in their 2–1 victory over Real Betis. In his first season with Barcelona, Márquez made 22 league appearances (31 across all competitions) as the team finished second in the league, five points behind Valencia.

During his second season, he was moved from his natural position as a centre-back to a defensive midfield role, due to injuries to players Thiago Motta, Edmílson and Gerard. That year, Barcelona won its 17th league title on 14 May 2005 after a 1–1 tie with Levante. A month after an injury to his left knee, Márquez returned to play against A.C. Milan in the first leg of the 2006 UEFA Champions League semi-final. Barcelona, playing away at the San Siro, won 1–0. On 17 May, Barcelona won the UEFA Champions League after defeating Arsenal 2–1 in the final, with Márquez playing the entire match. He became the first Mexican to play in a Champions League final and the first to win it. Following his participation with Mexico at the 2006 World Cup, Márquez signed a four-year contract extension with Barcelona, with the buy-out clause set at €100 million.

During the 2007–08 season, Márquez formed a partnership with new signing Gabriel Milito while captain Carles Puyol was out injured. Constant injuries, however, threw off his form. Márquez's success declined with the rest of the season, leading Barcelona to end up in third place in La Liga after a miserable second half where injuries lead to his contribution being negligible. Even so, new coach Pep Guardiola continued to rely on his contributions; with the departure of Ronaldinho, Márquez had become the last original signing of the Frank Rijkaard era to remain on the team. In October 2007, Márquez was included in the list of players nominated for the FIFA World Player of the Year award, the only player from the CONCACAF to be nominated.

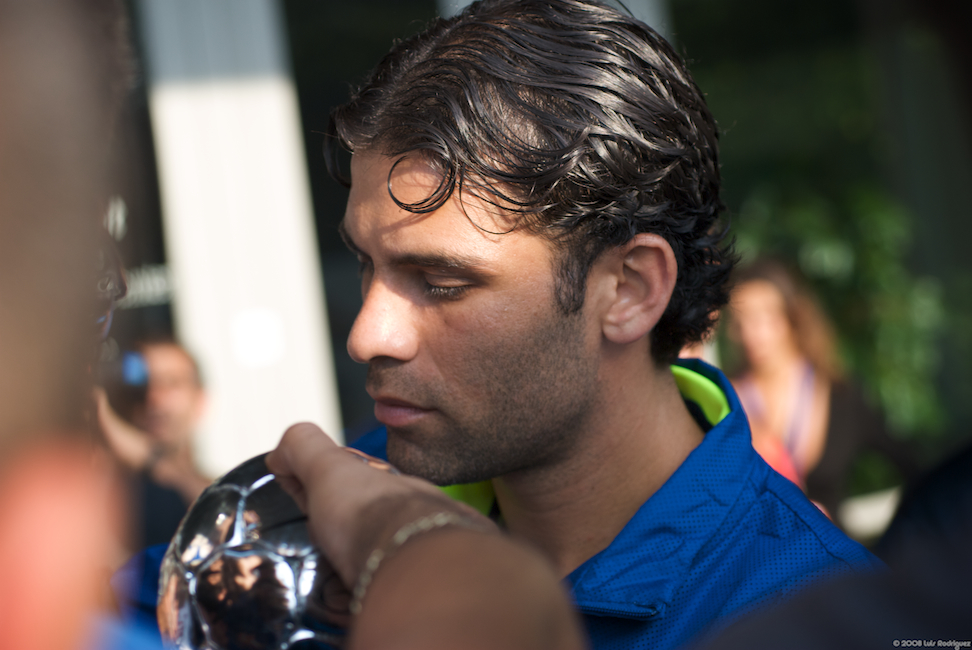
Márquez with Barcelona in August 2009

Márquez was Guardiola's first-choice at centre-back along with captain Puyol for the 2008–09 season. On 13 December 2008, Márquez played his 200th match for Barcelona in their 2–0 win against Real Madrid. On 28 April 2009, during Barcelona's 2008–09 Champions League semi-final match against Chelsea, Márquez sustained a knee injury which required surgery, meaning he would miss the remainder of the season. Barcelona would go on to complete a historic treble after winning the Champions League final 2–0 against Manchester United.

Prior to the 2009–10 season, Márquez received an offer from Italian Serie A club Fiorentina. Márquez, however, said he wanted to end his career at Barcelona. Márquez eventually signed a new contract with Barça in November 2009 that would keep him at the club until 2012. On 20 February 2010, he scored his first goal since his return against Racing Santander.

On 31 July 2010, Márquez was released from his contract by Barcelona. During his time with the club, he played in 242 matches and scored 13 goals, making him the most-capped non-European player in the club's history and the eighth-most capped foreigner. In his 12-year European career, Márquez appeared in 46 UEFA Champions League matches, which was the most by a Mexican or CONCACAF player, until compatriot Javier Hernández surpassed that record in 2017. At the time, Márquez was also one of two players from CONCACAF to play in a Champions League final, the other being Trinidad and Tobago's Dwight Yorke for Manchester United in 1999.

=== New York Red Bulls ===
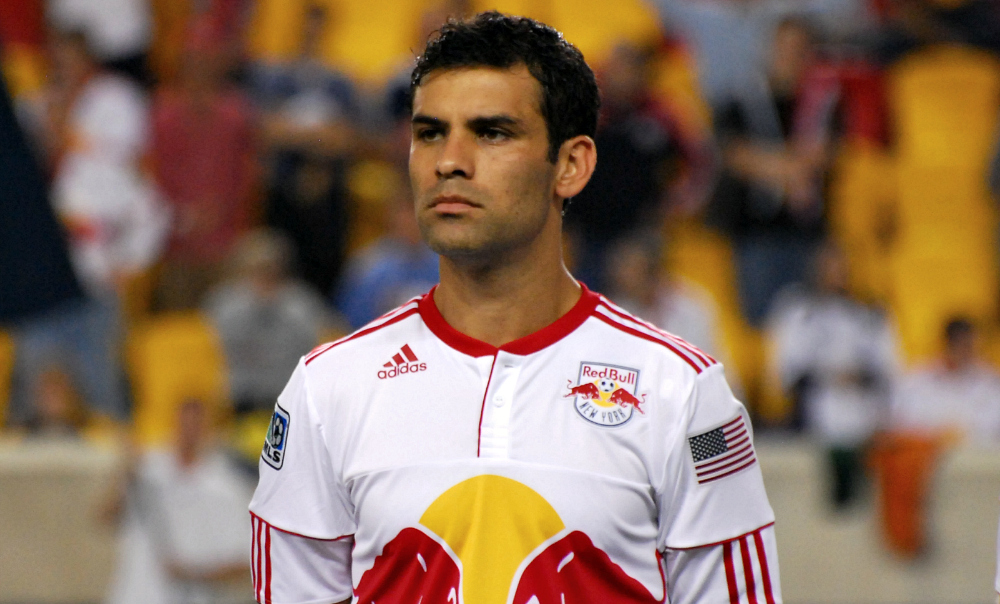
Márquez during his time with the New York Red Bulls

After seven years with and being released by Barcelona and participating at the 2010 FIFA World Cup, it was reported that Italian club Juventus were interested in signing Márquez as a back-up for defender Leonardo Bonucci.

On 1 August 2010, it was announced that Márquez had signed with the New York Red Bulls of Major League Soccer on a three-and-a-half-year contract. He was the club's third Designated Player and was unveiled to the media at Red Bull Arena on 3 August wearing the number 4 jersey and reuniting with former Barcelona teammate Thierry Henry. On 8 August, Márquez made his MLS debut against the Chicago Fire in a scoreless draw. On 21 August, Márquez scored his first goal, an astonishing shot with his right foot, for the Red Bulls in a 4–1 win at Toronto FC. On 21 October, Márquez started for the Red Bulls in a 2–0 victory over New England Revolution which clinched the regular season Eastern Conference title.

New York released Márquez on 13 December 2012. His stint in New York was heavily criticized by many fans and journalists for his constant injuries, suspensions and perceived lack of commitment to the fans and club. Márquez later revealed in an interview with ESPN Deportes that going to play in the United States was "a bad decision" and called it the worst decision he ever made in his career. He said that he had misjudged the arc of his career, believing it was declining faster than it was, and that he regretted declining offers from various European clubs, including one from Italian side Juventus.

=== León ===
Hours after being released by the New York Red Bulls, it was announced that Márquez signed with Liga MX side León, returning to his home country after 13 years abroad. It would not be until 5 October 2013 that Márquez scored his first goal for León in the Liga MX against Puebla, scoring a penalty kick in the 17th minute.

On 15 December, León captured the Apertura 2013 title after defeating América 5–1 on aggregate. Márquez, the club captain, played in both legs as he lifted his first league title in Mexico, more than 14 years after losing the final against Toluca when he played in Atlas. The following tournament, Márquez helped León capture their second straight league title, becoming only the second team in history to win consecutive league titles in the short tournament era, the first being UNAM, who won the Clausura 2004 and Apertura 2004. He also became the first Mexican footballer to win league titles in three countries.

=== Hellas Verona ===
On 7 August 2014, Hellas Verona of Serie A signed Márquez on undisclosed terms. He stated that he had taken a pay cut to join the club as he was desperate to return to Europe. Márquez made his league debut on 31 August, starting as Verona played out a goalless draw at home against Atalanta.

=== Return to Atlas ===
On 21 December 2015, it was announced that Márquez had officially transferred to Atlas, returning to the club he debuted with. He was handed the number 4 shirt.

On 19 April 2018, Márquez announced that he would retire at the end of the season. He did, however, state his intention of representing Mexico at the World Cup. Márquez played his final match at the Estadio Jalisco on 20 April, a 1–0 victory in the Clásico Tapatío against Guadalajara. The following week, Márquez played his final club match against Pachuca at the Estadio Hidalgo, which ended in a 0–0 draw.

== International career ==
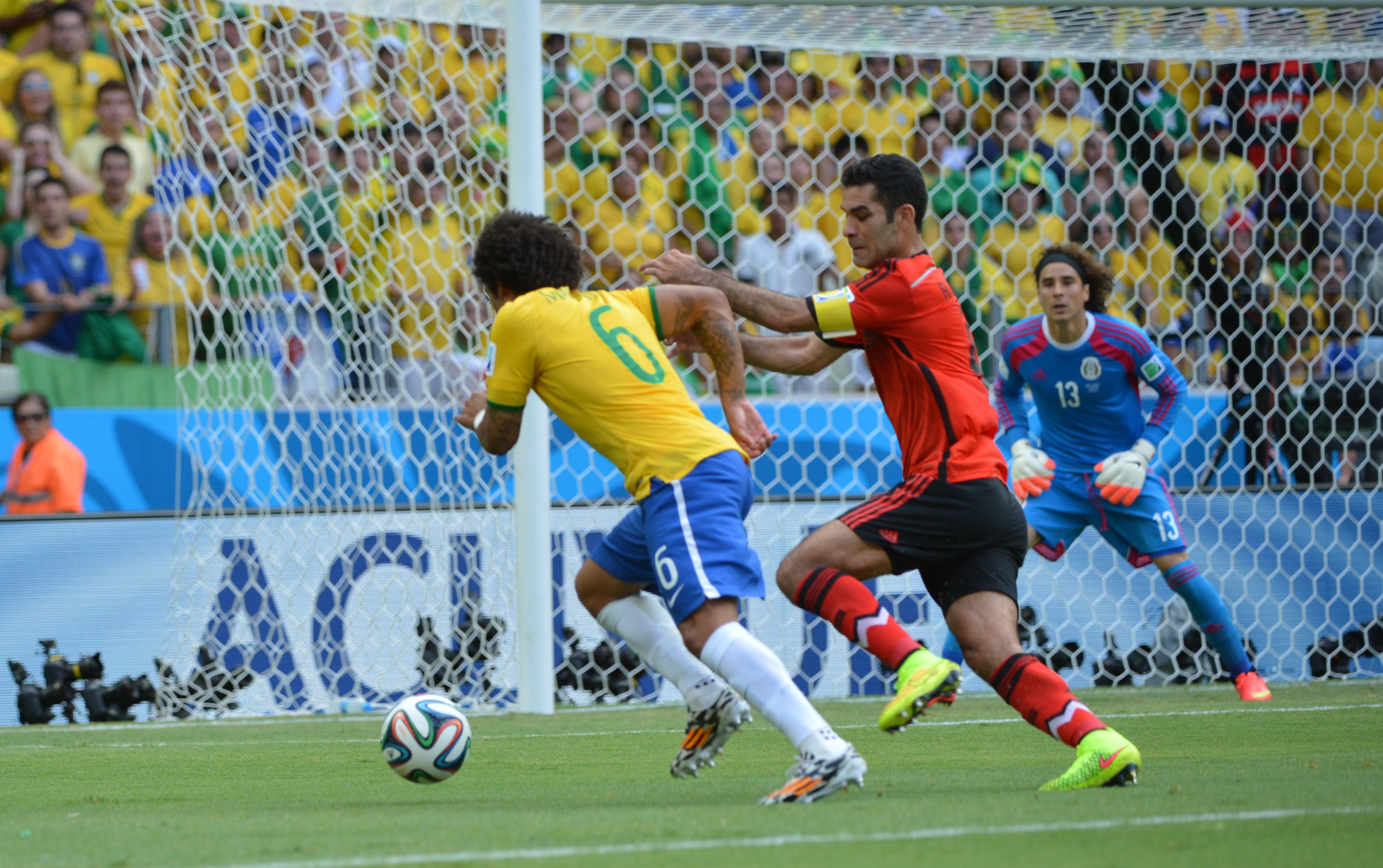
Márquez defending Marcelo at the 2014 FIFA World Cup

Márquez made his debut with Mexico on 5 February 1997 in a friendly match against Ecuador. It was reported that his call-up was due to an error made by national team coach Bora Milutinović, who wanted to call up fellow Atlas player César Márquez. Márquez became a regular call-up for Mexico, although he was not chosen for the 1998 FIFA World Cup squad. Márquez played various tournaments with the national team, winning the 1999 FIFA Confederations Cup and losing to Canada at the 2000 CONCACAF Gold Cup. Márquez started all four of Mexico's games during the 2002 World Cup in South Korea and Japan, where he was given the captain's armband by then coach Javier Aguirre despite his young age of 23. He received a red card during Mexico's second round 2–0 loss to the United States for a deliberate mid-air head butt on Cobi Jones in the final minutes of the match.

Márquez was selected by Ricardo La Volpe for the 2006 World Cup in Germany. Márquez played in all of three of Mexico's opening round matches, and scored the lone Mexican goal in a 2–1 loss to Argentina in the second round off a Pável Pardo free kick which was headed to the far post by Mario Méndez, allowing an unmarked Márquez to strike the ball into the back of the net. The winner was scored by Maxi Rodríguez in extra time after Hernán Crespo had equalised for Argentina.

New Mexico coach Hugo Sánchez called-up Márquez to participate in the 2007 CONCACAF Gold Cup and the 2007 Copa América. Márquez joined up with the team Mexico for the Gold Cup's championship game against the United States after the conclusion of 2006–07 La Liga; he started the match, which Mexico lost 2–1.

Márquez captained Mexico at the 2010 World Cup, scoring Mexico's goal in the tournament's opening match against South Africa which ended in a 1–1 draw. In Mexico's 2–0 win against France, Márquez assisted Javier Hernández in Mexico's first goal.

On 29 March 2011, Márquez became the eighth player in history to reach 100 caps for Mexico in a friendly match against Venezuela, where Mexico drew 1–1.

During Mexico's opening match at the 2014 World Cup – a 1–0 win over Cameroon – Márquez became the first player to captain a team in four World Cups. On 23 June, he scored the opening goal in the 3–1 win against Croatia, thus advancing to the knockout stage. This goal made Márquez the first Mexican player to score in three consecutive World Cups, and the second Mexican player ever to score in three World Cups after Cuauhtémoc Blanco.

In May 2015, it was announced Márquez was included in the 23-man squad that would participate in the Copa América tournament in Chile. He was selected to start as captain in Mexico's opening fixture of the tournament, a 0–0 draw with Bolivia in Viña del Mar. The following year, Márquez captained Mexico at the Copa América Centenario, scoring in their opening game a 3–1 victory over Uruguay.

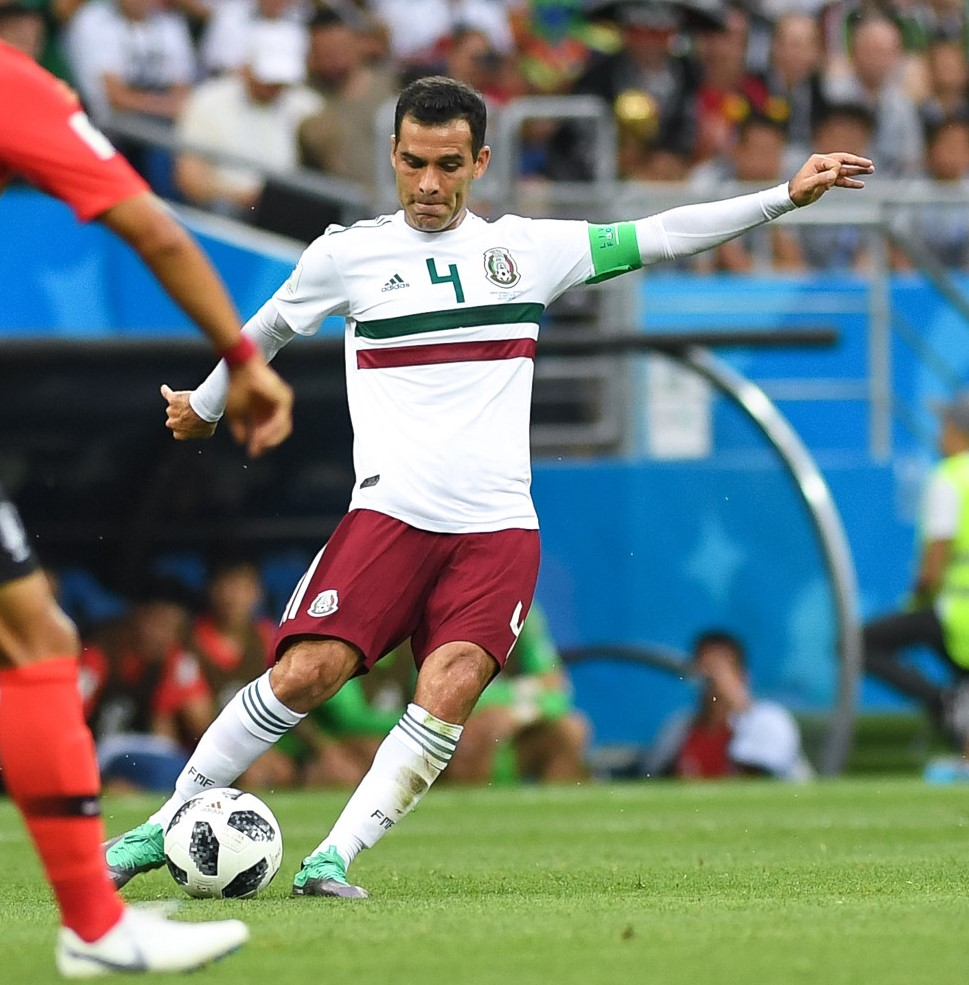
Márquez captaining Mexico against South Korea at the 2018 FIFA World Cup

On 11 November 2016, in a 2018 FIFA World Cup qualification in Columbus, Ohio, Márquez scored the winning goal for Mexico in the 89th minute to seal a 2–1 victory over the United States.

Appearing in Mexico's second group-stage match against New Zealand at the 2017 FIFA Confederations Cup, Márquez – at 38 years and four months – became the second-oldest player to appear in a match in Confederations Cup history. He was also making his first appearance at the tournament since 2005, setting new record for most years between consecutive matches with twelve.

On 4 June 2018, Marquez was named in Mexico's final 23-man squad for the World Cup. This meant he would travel to his fifth World Cup finals, becoming only the fourth player in history to do so, alongside German Lothar Matthäus, Italian Gianluigi Buffon and fellow Mexican Antonio Carbajal. He was substituted in for Andrés Guardado at the 74th minute in Mexico's 1–0 win over defending-champions Germany, and became the third man in history to play at a fifth World Cup. On 2 July, in Mexico's round of 16 match against Brazil, Márquez became the first player ever to play as a captain in five World Cups and was substituted off at half-time, marking his last appearance as a professional.

== Coaching career ==
Following his retirement, he was introduced as Atlas' new sporting president, succeeding Fabricio Bassa. He held the position until May 2019. In October 2021, Márquez joined the TUDN network as an analyst and commentator for national team games.

=== Alcalá ===
On 8 April 2020, Márquez was appointed as a youth coach at Alcalá, taking care of the Cadete A (under 15) squad for the 2020–21 season.

=== Barcelona Atlètic ===
On 14 July 2022, Márquez was appointed head coach of Barcelona Atlètic, signing a two-year contract. In his first season in charge, he led Barça Atlètic to a fourth place finish, qualifying for the promotional playoffs before being eliminated by Real Madrid Castilla 5–4 on aggregate. On 14 June 2023, it was announced that Márquez would continue with the team, signing an extension. On 21 July 2024, Barcelona Atlètic announced Márquez's departure from the club.

=== Mexico ===
In July 2024, Javier Aguirre was appointed manager of the Mexico national team, with Márquez joining his technical staff. In July 2026, Márquez succeeded Aguirre as manager following Mexico's elimination from the 2026 FIFA World Cup. He made his managerial debut on September 27 in a friendly against Colombia, which ended in a 1–1 draw.

== Style of play and reception ==
Márquez is widely considered to be one of Mexico's greatest players and it's greatest defender. Throughout his career he was capable of playing as a centre-back, sweeper, or defensive midfielder. He was described as elegant on the ball and in his tackling abilities, also possessing excellent technical ability and vision, tactical awareness, was dependable in the air for both defending and attacking, and was skillful coming out of defense. Affectionately nicknamed the "Kaiser of Michoacan", he also stood out for his leadership. In 2024, La Liga included Márquez in its Barcelona best eleven of the 21st century.

== Outside football ==
=== Personal life ===
Márquez's father, Rafael Márquez Esqueda, was also a professional footballer. Rafael married Mexican actress Adriana Lavat in December 2001 and had two children, Santiago Rafael and Rafaela, before separating in 2007 and divorcing. He is now married to Jaydy Michel, ex-wife of singer Alejandro Sanz. His younger cousin, Luis Alberto Márquez, is also a professional footballer. Luis developed in Atlas' rival club, Guadalajara and also played for Zacatepec.

He appeared on the North American cover of FIFA 12 alongside Wayne Rooney and Landon Donovan.

In October 2017, Márquez helped found Asociación Mexicana de Futbolistas (Mexican Footballers Association).

=== Kingpin Act designation ===
On 9 August 2017, it was reported that Márquez was among 22 people sanctioned under the Foreign Narcotics Kingpin Designation Act (also known as the "Kingpin Act") by the United States Treasury Department for alleged ties to a drug trafficking organization allegedly headed by Raúl Flores Hernández, a suspected drug trafficker with links to the Sinaloa Cartel and the Jalisco New Generation Cartel. He was placed on a Specially Designated Nationals List by the Treasury Department's Office of Foreign Assets Control (OFAC). Nine businesses, including a soccer school and charitable foundation, were linked to Márquez by the OFAC. All 22 people were accused of providing support to, or being under the control of Flores Hernández.

According to the OFAC, Márquez conducted money laundering by acting as a strawperson for Flores Hernández and his criminal organization. They alleged that Márquez used businessmen Mauricio Heredia Horner and Marco Antonio Fregoso González to act for or on his behalf. Márquez's assets "that are under U.S. jurisdiction or are in the control of U.S. persons" would be frozen. The Mexican Attorney General's Office said in a statement that Márquez came voluntarily to their offices to provide a statement that same day. Since 22 September 2021 he has been removed from the list and is now clear of his name from the U.S. Treasury Department.

== Career statistics ==
=== Club ===
Appearances and goals by club, season and competition
| Club | Season | League | | | National cup (Note: Includes Coupe de France. Copa del Rey, U.S. Open Cup, Coppa Italia) | | League cup (Note: Includes Coupe de la Ligue) | | Continental | | Other | | Total | |
| Club | Season | Division | Apps | Goals | Apps | Goals | Apps | Goals | Apps | Goals | Apps | Goals | Apps | Goals |
|---|---|---|---|---|---|---|---|---|---|---|---|---|---|---|
| Atlas | 1996–97 | Mexican Primera División | 24 | 2 | — | | — | | — | | — | | 24 | 2 |
| Atlas | 1997–98 | Mexican Primera División | 20 | 1 | — | | — | | — | | — | | 20 | 1 |
| Atlas | 1998 –99 | Mexican Primera División | 33 | 3 | — | | — | | — | | — | | 33 | 3 |
| Atlas | Total | | 77 | 6 | — | | — | | — | | — | | 77 | 6 |
| Monaco | 1999–2000 | Ligue 1 | 23 | 3 | 2 | 0 | 2 | 0 | 6 (Note: Appearances in UEFA Cup) | 0 | — | | 33 | 3 |
| Monaco | 2000–01 | Ligue 1 | 15 | 1 | 0 | 0 | 3 | 0 | 4 (Note: Appearances in UEFA Champions League) | 0 | 0 | 0 | 22 | 1 |
| Monaco | 2001–02 | Ligue 1 | 21 | 0 | 3 | 0 | 2 | 0 | — | | — | | 26 | 0 |
| Monaco | 2002–03 | Ligue 1 | 30 | 1 | 0 | 0 | 3 | 0 | — | | — | | 33 | 1 |
| Monaco | Total | | 89 | 5 | 5 | 0 | 10 | 0 | 10 | 0 | 0 | 0 | 114 | 5 |
| Barcelona | 2003–04 | La Liga | 22 | 1 | 6 | 0 | — | | 3 | 0 | — | | 31 | 1 |
| Barcelona | 2004–05 | La Liga | 34 | 3 | 1 | 0 | — | | 6 | 0 | — | | 41 | 3 |
| Barcelona | 2005–06 | La Liga | 25 | 0 | 3 | 1 | — | | 8 | 0 | 1 (Note: Appearance in Supercopa de España) | 0 | 37 | 1 |
| Barcelona | 2006–07 | La Liga | 21 | 1 | 5 | 0 | — | | 6 | 0 | 5 (Note: Two appearances in Supercopa de España, one appearance in UEFA Super Cup, two appearances and one goal in FIFA Club World Cup) | 1 | 37 | 2 |
| Barcelona | 2007–08 | La Liga | 23 | 2 | 5 | 0 | — | | 8 | 0 | — | | 36 | 2 |
| Barcelona | 2008–09 | La Liga | 23 | 1 | 4 | 1 | — | | 10 | 1 | — | | 37 | 3 |
| Barcelona | 2009–10 | La Liga | 15 | 1 | 3 | 0 | — | | 4 | 0 | 1 (Note: Appearance in FIFA Club World Cup) | 0 | 23 | 1 |
| Barcelona | 2010– 11 | La Liga | 0 | 0 | — | | — | | — | | — | | 0 | 0 |
| Barcelona | Total | | 163 | 9 | 27 | 2 | — | | 45 | 1 | 7 | 1 | 242 | 13 |
| New York Red Bulls | 2010 | Major League Soccer | 10 | 1 | 2 | 0 | — | | — | | 0 | 0 | 12 | 1 |
| New York Red Bulls | 2011 | Major League Soccer | 19 | 0 | 2 | 0 | — | | — | | 0 | 0 | 21 | 0 |
| New York Red Bulls | 2012 | Major League Soccer | 15 | 0 | 2 | 0 | — | | — | | 0 | 0 | 17 | 0 |
| New York Red Bulls | Total | | 44 | 1 | 6 | 0 | — | | — | | 0 | 0 | 50 | 1 |
| León | 2012–13 | Liga MX | 13 | 0 | — | | — | | 1 | 0 | — | | 14 | 1 |
| León | 2013–14 | Liga MX | 35 | 1 | — | | — | | 7 | 0 | — | | 42 | 1 |
| León | 2014–15 | Liga MX | 2 | 0 | — | | — | | — | | — | | 2 | 0 |
| León | Total | | 50 | 1 | — | | — | | 8 | 0 | — | | 58 | 1 |
| Hellas Verona | 2014–15 | Serie A | 26 | 0 | 3 | 0 | — | | — | | — | | 29 | 0 |
| Hellas Verona | 2015–16 | Serie A | 9 | 0 | 1 | 0 | — | | — | | — | | 10 | 0 |
| Hellas Verona | Total | | 35 | 0 | 4 | 0 | — | | — | | — | | 39 | 0 |
| Atlas | 2015–16 | Liga MX | 14 | 1 | — | | — | | — | | — | | 14 | 1 |
| Atlas | 2016–17 | Liga MX | 23 | 0 | — | | — | | — | | — | | 23 | 0 |
| Atlas | 2017–18 | Liga MX | 21 | 0 | — | | — | | — | | — | | 21 | 0 |
| Atlas | Total | | 58 | 1 | — | | — | | — | | — | | 58 | 1 |
| Career total | | | 516 | 23 | 42 | 2 | 10 | 0 | 63 | 1 | 7 | 1 | 638 | 27 |

=== International ===
Appearances and goals by national team and year
| National team | Year | Apps | Goals |
|---|---|---|---|
| Mexico | 1997 | 1 | 0 |
| Mexico | 1998 | 0 | 0 |
| Mexico | 1999 | 12 | 1 |
| Mexico | 2000 | 10 | 2 |
| Mexico | 2001 | 12 | 0 |
| Mexico | 2002 | 7 | 1 |
| Mexico | 2003 | 4 | 1 |
| Mexico | 2004 | 8 | 1 |
| Mexico | 2005 | 9 | 1 |
| Mexico | 2006 | 6 | 1 |
| Mexico | 2007 | 9 | 1 |
| Mexico | 2008 | 6 | 1 |
| Mexico | 2009 | 2 | 0 |
| Mexico | 2010 | 11 | 1 |
| Mexico | 2011 | 12 | 1 |
| Mexico | 2012 | 2 | 0 |
| Mexico | 2013 | 4 | 1 |
| Mexico | 2014 | 9 | 2 |
| Mexico | 2015 | 5 | 0 |
| Mexico | 2016 | 7 | 2 |
| Mexico | 2017 | 6 | 0 |
| Mexico | 2018 | 5 | 0 |
| Total | | 147 | 17 |

Scores and results list Mexico's goal tally first.

List of international goals scored by Rafael Márquez
| No. | Date | Venue | Opponent | Score | Result | Competition |
|---|---|---|---|---|---|---|
| 1. | 5 February 1999 | Hong Kong Stadium, Wan Chai, Hong Kong | Egypt | 1–0 | 3–0 | 1999 Carlsberg Cup |
| 2. | 13 February 2000 | Qualcomm Stadium, San Diego, United States | Trinidad and Tobago | 1–0 | 4–0 | 2000 CONCACAF Gold Cup |
| 3. | 3 September 2000 | Estadio Azteca, Mexico City, Mexico | Panama | 5–1 | 7–1 | 2002 FIFA World Cup qualification |
| 4. | 12 May 2002 | Estadio Azteca, Mexico City, Mexico | Colombia | 2–1 | 2–1 | Friendly |
| 5. | 24 July 2003 | Estadio Azteca, Mexico City, Mexico | Costa Rica | 1–0 | 2–0 | 2003 CONCACAF Gold Cup |
| 6. | 19 June 2004 | Alamodome, San Antonio, United States | Dominica | 3–0 | 10–0 | 2006 FIFA World Cup qualification |
| 7. | 7 September 2005 | Estadio Azteca, Mexico City, Mexico | Panama | 2–0 | 5–0 | 2006 FIFA World Cup qualification |
| 8. | 24 June 2006 | Zentralstadion, Leipzig, Germany | Argentina | 1–0 | 1–2 (a.e.t.) | 2006 FIFA World Cup |
| 9. | 28 March 2007 | McAfee Coliseum, Oakland, United States | Ecuador | 2–2 | 4–2 | Friendly |
| 10. | 10 September 2008 | Estadio Víctor Manuel Reyna, Tuxtla Gutiérrez, Mexico | Canada | 2–0 | 2–1 | 2010 FIFA World Cup qualification |
| 11. | 11 June 2010 | Soccer City, Johannesburg, South Africa | South Africa | 1–1 | 1–1 | 2010 FIFA World Cup |
| 12. | 12 June 2011 | Soldier Field, Chicago, United States | Costa Rica | 1–0 | 4–1 | 2011 CONCACAF Gold Cup |
| 13. | 13 November 2013 | Estadio Azteca, Mexico City, Mexico | New Zealand | 5–0 | 5–1 | 2014 FIFA World Cup qualification |
| 14. | 2 April 2014 | University of Phoenix Stadium, Glendale, United States | United States | 1–2 | 2–2 | Friendly |
| 15. | 23 June 2014 | Arena Pernambuco, São Lourenço da Mata, Brazil | Croatia | 1–0 | 3–1 | 2014 FIFA World Cup |
| 16. | 5 June 2016 | University of Phoenix Stadium, Glendale, United States | Uruguay | 2–1 | 3–1 | Copa América Centenario |
| 17. | 11 November 2016 | Mapfre Stadium, Columbus, United States | United States | 2–1 | 2–1 | 2018 FIFA World Cup qualification |

=== Managerial ===
As of match played 17 November 2026

Managerial record by team and tenure
| Team | Nat. | From | To | Record | | | | | | | | Ref |
| Team | Nat. | From | To | G | W | D | L | GF | GA | GD | Win % | Ref |
|---|---|---|---|---|---|---|---|---|---|---|---|---|
| Barcelona Atlètic | (Spain) | 14 July 2022 | 21 July 2024 | 82 | 40 | 21 | 21 | 118 | 91 | +27 | 48.78 | |
| Mexico | (Mexico) | 8 July 2026 | Present | 6 | 1 | 2 | 3 | 5 | 10 | −5 | 16.67 | |
| Total | | | | 88 | 41 | 23 | 24 | 123 | 101 | +22 | 46.59 | — |

== Honours ==
Atlas

- Primera División de México runner-up: Verano 1999

Monaco

- French Division 1: 1999–2000
- Coupe de la Ligue: 2002–03
- Trophée des Champions: 2000

Barcelona

- La Liga: 2004–05, 2005–06, 2008–09, 2009–10
- Copa del Rey: 2008–09
- Supercopa de España: 2005, 2006, 2009
- UEFA Champions League: 2005–06, 2008–09
- UEFA Super Cup: 2009
- FIFA Club World Cup: 2009

León

- Liga MX: Apertura 2013, Clausura 2014

Mexico

- FIFA Confederations Cup: 1999; fourth place: 2005, 2017
- Copa América runner-up: 2001; third Place: 1999, 2007
- CONCACAF Gold Cup: 2003, 2011
- CONCACAF Cup: 2015

Individual

- Primera División de México Best Defender: Verano 1999
- French Division 1 Team of the Season: 1999–2000
- French Division 1 Best Defender: 1999–2000,
- CONCACAF Gold Cup Best XI: 2000
- CONCACAF Best Player: 2005
- Free Kick Masters: 2008
- Tecate Premios Deportes Best Center-back: 2009
- Tecate Premios Deportes Best XI: 2009
- MLS All-Star: 2011
- CONCACAF Best XI: 2016
- Liga MX Balón de Oro Responsabilidad Social: 2017
- IFFHS CONCACAF Men's All Time Dream Team
- FIFA International Football Hall of Fame: 2023
- IFFHS Men's All Time Mexico Dream Team

== See also ==
- List of men's footballers with 100 or more international caps
