= Óscar Mascorro =

Mexican footballer (born 1980)

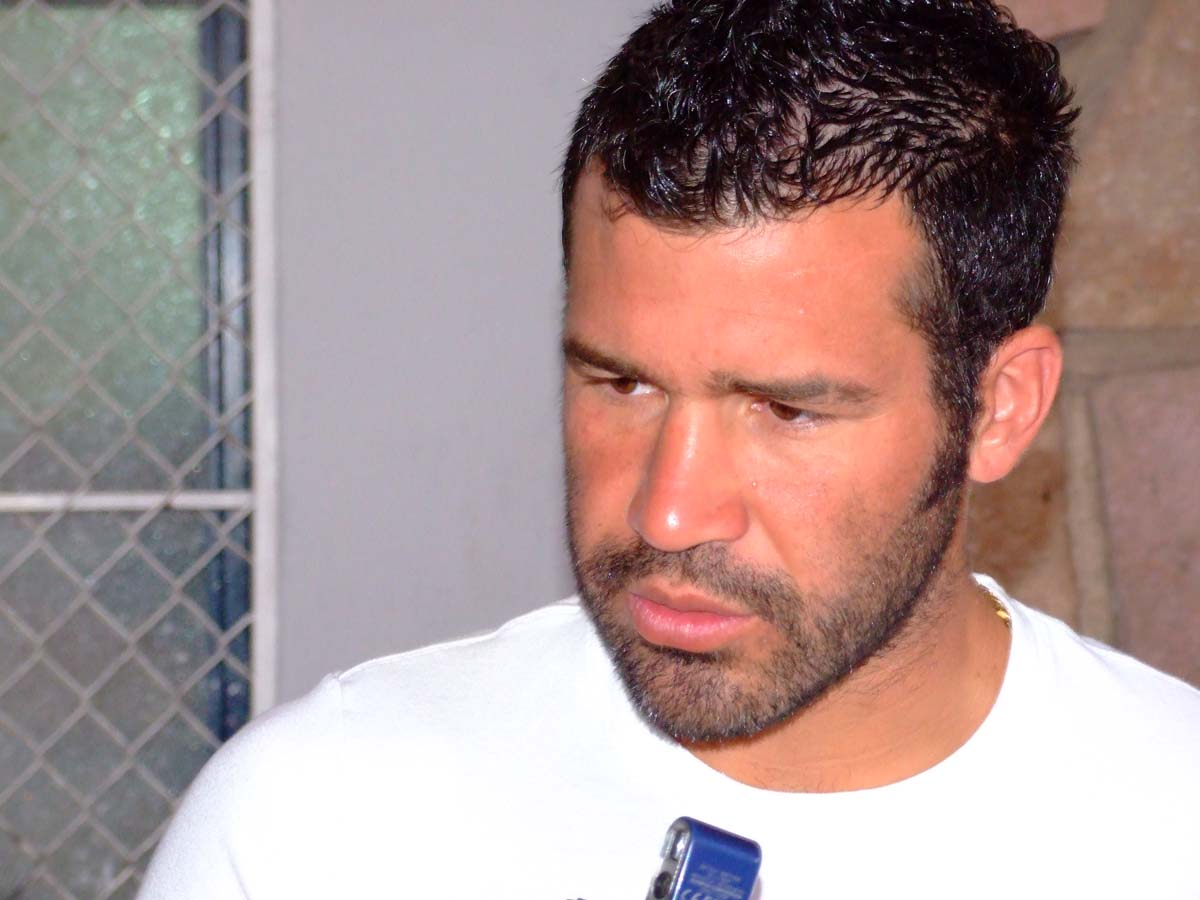

Personal information
- Full name: Óscar Yaroslav Mascorro Ábrego
- Date of birth: 11 February 1980 (age 46)
- Place of birth: Ciudad Victoria, Tamaulipas, Mexico
- Height: 1.80 m (5 ft 11 in)
- Position: Defender

Youth career
- 1994–1996: Monterrey

Senior career*
Years	Team	Apps	(Gls)
1998	Monterrey	1	(0)
1999–2000	Toros Neza	27	(0)
2000	UNAM	9	(0)
2000–2005	Puebla	161	(6)
2006–2013	San Luis	108	(3)
2010–2011	→ Veracruz (loan)	23	(4)
2011–2013	→ León (loan)	9	(0)
2013–2015	Veracruz	48	(2)
- * Club domestic league appearances and goals as of 15 December 2014

Óscar Yaroslav Mascorro Ábrego (Note: In this Spanish name, the first or paternal surname is Mascorro and the second or maternal family name is Ábrego.) (born 11 February 1980) is a Mexican former professional footballer who played as a defender.

== Honours ==
León

- Apertura 2011-2012
