= Luis Delgado (Mexican footballer) =

Mexican footballer (born 1990)

Personal information
- Full name: Luis Antonio Delgado Tapia
- Date of birth: 19 August 1990 (age 36)
- Place of birth: León, Mexico
- Height: 1.73 m (5 ft 8 in)
- Position: Defender

Senior career*
Years	Team	Apps	(Gls)
2010–2015	León	67	(3)
2015–2017	Mineros de Zacatecas	34	(0)
2017–2018	Correcaminos UAT	15	(0)
Total		116	(3)
- * Club domestic league appearances and goals

Luis Antonio Delgado Tapia (born August 19, 1990) is a professional Mexican footballer who most recently played for Correcaminos UAT on loan from León.
