= Yovanny Arrechea =

American Colombian football striker (born 1983)

Personal information
- Full name: Yovanny Arrechea Amú
- Date of birth: 23 January 1983 (age 43)
- Place of birth: Santander de Quilichao, Cauca, Colombia
- Height: 1.83 m (6 ft 0 in)
- Position: Striker

Youth career
- 2002–2003: América de Cali

Senior career*
Years	Team	Apps	(Gls)
2004	Real Cartagena	30	(25)
2005–2006	América de Cali	55	(9)
2007	Rosario Central	7	(0)
2007–2008	América de Cali	0	(0)
2008	Deportivo Pasto	17	(2)
2009	Santa Fe	30	(8)
2010	Millonarios	33	(18)
2011	Atlético Nacional	16	(3)
2011–2012	Changchun Yatai	13	(6)
2012	→ Hohhot Dongjin (loan)	25	(7)
2013	León	13	(1)
2013	Santa Fe	?	(?)
2014	Once Caldas	?	(?)
- * Club domestic league appearances and goals as of 29 April 2013

Yovanny Arrechea (Spanish pronunciation: [ɟʝoˈβanjareˈtʃea]; born 23 January 1983) is an American Colombian football striker. He currently is under contract with Club León, but he was not registered to play for the new season since the club had already hit the league limit of five foreign players.

== Career ==
Born in the city of Santander de Quilichao, Cauca in Colombia, Arrechea was a graduate of América de Cali's youth system. He went on loan to second division side Real Cartagena in 2004. After scoring 20 goals in 30 matches, Arrechea returned to América. Spells with Deportivo Pasto, Club Santa Fe, Millonarios and Atlético Nacional followed, and then he moved to China to join Changchun Yatai in 2011. Arrechea also had a spell with Liga MX side Club León before returning to Colombia to play for Santa Fe in the Liga Postobón. Since 2014 he was transferred to Once Caldas club.

== Statistics (Official games/Colombian Ligue and Colombian Cup) ==
(As of November 14, 2010)

Year	Team	Colombian Ligue Matches	Goals	Colombian Cup Matches	Goals	Total Matches	Total Goals
2010	Millonarios	33	18	10	11	43	29
Total	Millonarios	33	18	10	11	43	29
