= 1996–97 Toros Neza season =

Toros Neza
1996–97 season
- Manager: Enrique Meza
- Stadium: Estadio Neza 86
- Invierno: 8th Playoffs: Semifinals
- Verano: 3rd Playoffs: Runners-up
- Copa México: Runners-up
- Top goalscorer: League: Nildeson (20 goals); All: Nildeson (20 goals)
- Biggest win: Toros Neza 6–2 Atlas (13 October 1996)
- Biggest defeat: Guadalajara 6–1 Toros Neza (1 June 1997)
Home colours	Away colours
- All statistics correct as of 30 January 2019.

The 1996–97 Toros Neza season was Toros Neza's campaign in the Mexican Primera División and the Copa México. Managed by Enrique Meza, the club finished eighth in the Torneo Invierno and reached the playoff semifinals. In the Torneo Verano, Toros Neza finished third before reaching the final and ending as runners-up. The club was also runners-up in the Copa México.

Nildeson was Toros Neza's leading scorer during the season with 20 goals in all competitions.

== Coaching staff ==
Position	Name
Head coach	(Mexico) Enrique Meza
Assistant coaches	(Mexico) Miguel Esquivel
Assistant coaches	(Mexico) Rafael Chávez
Fitness coach	(Mexico) Jaime Espejel
Doctor	(Mexico) Gregorio Domínguez

== Players ==
=== Squad information ===
No.	Pos.	Nat.	Name	Date of birth (age)	Signed in	Previous club
Goalkeepers
1	GK	(Mexico)	Pablo Larios	31 July 1960 (aged 36)	1994	(Mexico) Puebla
22	GK	(Mexico)	Juan Gutiérrez	7 September 1967 (aged 28)	1995	(Mexico) Toluca
Defenders
2	DF	(Mexico)	Humberto González	1 August 1970 (aged 26)	1996	
3	DF	(Mexico)	Pedro Osorio	29 December 1965 (aged 30)	1996	(Mexico) Morelia
4	DF	(Mexico)	Miguel Herrera	18 March 1968 (aged 28)	1995	(Mexico) Atlante
8	DF	(Mexico)	Humberto Romero	11 October 1964 (aged 31)	1994	(Mexico) UdeG
13	DF	(Mexico)	Jesús López	24 May 1971 (aged 25)	1994	
16	DF	(Mexico)	Ernesto Pérez	15 August 1972 (aged 23)	1996	
20	DF	(Mexico)	Carlos Briseño	12 May 1965 (aged 31)	1996	(Mexico) Atlético Yucatán
21	DF	(Mexico)	Genaro Torres	23 March 1965 (aged 31)		
25	DF	(Argentina)	Federico Lussenhoff	14 January 1974 (aged 22)	1996	(Argentina) Rosario Central
Midfielders
5	MF	(Mexico)	Miguel Murillo	28 June 1966 (aged 30)		
6	MF	(Mexico)	Guillermo Vázquez (Captain)	25 May 1967 (aged 29)		
10	MF	(Chile)	Rodrigo Ruiz	10 May 1972 (aged 24)	1996	(Mexico) Puebla
14	MF	(Mexico)	Manuel Virchis	13 March 1969 (aged 27)	1995	
18	MF	(Mexico)	Carlos Reinoso Jr.	8 July 1970 (aged 26)	1993	(Mexico) UANL
23	MF	(Mexico)	Javier Saavedra	13 March 1973 (aged 23)	1996	
24	MF	(Mexico)	Juan Manuel Rivera	5 July 1968 (aged 28)	1996	
Forwards
11	FW	(Argentina)	Antonio Mohamed (VC)	2 April 1970 (aged 26)	1993	(Argentina) Independiente
15	FW	(Mexico)	Ramiro Romero	26 January 1970 (aged 26)	1995	(Mexico) UAT
17	FW	(Brazil)	Nildeson	29 October 1968 (aged 27)	1996	(Mexico) UAT
26	FW	(Argentina)	Germán Arangio	23 May 1976 (aged 20)	1996	(Argentina) Racing
26	FW	(Mexico)	Óscar Vega	4 May 1975 (aged 21)	1997 (Winter)	
30	FW	(Mexico)	Carlos García	8 January 1972 (aged 24)		

Players and squad numbers last updated on 30 January 2019.
Note: Flags indicate national team as has been defined under FIFA eligibility rules. Players may hold more than one non-FIFA nationality.

== Competitions ==
=== Overview ===
Competition	First match	Last match	Starting round	Final position	Record							
Competition	First match	Last match	Starting round	Final position	Pld	W	D	L	GF	GA	GD	Win %
Torneo Invierno	10 August 1996	15 December 1996	Matchday 1	8th	23	12	0	11	45	45	+0	52.17
Torneo Verano	18 January 1997	1 June 1997	Matchday 1	Runners-up	23	11	4	8	50	45	+5	47.83
Copa México	30 June 1996	3 August 1996	Group stage	Runners-up	10	7	0	3	19	10	+9	70.00
Total					56	30	4	22	114	100	+14	53.57

Source: RSSSF.com

=== Torneo Invierno ===
==== League table ====
Pos	Team	Pld	W	D	L	GF	GA	GD	Pts	Qualification or relegation
6	Necaxa	17	8	5	4	24	19	+5	29	Advance to Liguilla (Playoffs)
7	Atlas	17	6	8	3	28	26	+2	26	Advance to Repechage
8	Toros Neza	17	8	0	9	30	36	−6	24	Advance to Repechage
9	León	17	5	8	4	24	19	+5	23	Advance to Repechage
10	Cruz Azul	17	5	5	7	26	26	0	20	

Source: Liga MX
Rules for classification: 1) Points; 2) Goal difference; 3) Number of goals scored; 4) Head-to-head results between tied teams; 5) Number of goals scored away; 6) Highest relegation coefficient; 7) Fair Play points

==== Results summary ====
Overall								Home						Away					
Pld	W	D	L	GF	GA	GD	Pts	W	D	L	GF	GA	GD	W	D	L	GF	GA	GD
17	8	0	9	30	36	−6	24	5	0	4	22	20	+2	3	0	5	8	16	−8

Source: Liga MX

==== Matches ====
10 August 1996 1	Cruz Azul	3–0	Toros Neza	Mexico City
17:00		Report	Pintado 10'; Verdirame 31'; Hermosillo 67'	Stadium: Estadio Azul

18 August 1996 2	Toros Neza	0–3	Puebla	Ciudad Nezahualcóyotl
15:00		Report	Wolf 50'; Guzmán 65'; Muñoz 88'	Stadium: Estadio Neza 86

24 August 1996 3	UAG	1–2	Toros Neza	Zapopan
17:00	Arias 74'	Report	Nildeson 28', 40'	Stadium: Estadio Tres de Marzo

1 September 1996 4	Toros Neza	5–2	Pachuca	Ciudad Nezahualcóyotl
15:00	Mohamed 16'; López 36'; Nildeson 46', 56', 85'	Report	Medford 9'; Sáez 43'	Stadium: Estadio Neza 86

8 September 1996 5	Atlante	0–1	Toros Neza	Mexico City
12:00		Report	Mohamed 53'	Stadium: Estadio Azteca

16 September 1996 6	Toros Neza	1–2	Celaya	Ciudad Nezahualcóyotl
16:00	Mohamed 31'	Report	Míchel 11', 18'	Stadium: Estadio Neza 86

25 September 1996 7	Monterrey	5–1	Toros Neza	Monterrey
21:00	Patiño 15', 65', 71'; Salvador 26'; Morales 89'	Report	Nildeson 68'	Stadium: Estadio Tecnológico

29 September 1996 8	Toros Neza	2–0	Veracruz	Ciudad Nezahualcóyotl
15:00	Saavedra 22'; Arangio 62'	Report		Stadium: Estadio Neza 86

5 October 1996 9	Necaxa	2–0	Toros Neza	Mexico City
15:00	Peláez 32'; Zárate 49'	Report		Stadium: Estadio Azteca

13 October 1996 10	Toros Neza	6–2	Atlas	Ciudad Nezahualcóyotl
15:00	Arangio 38'; Mohamed 57', 68'; Vázquez 61'; Ruiz 74'; Figueroa 89'	Report	Padilla 49'; Mascareño 76'	Stadium: Estadio Neza 86

19 October 1996 11	Toluca	1–0	Toros Neza	Toluca
15:00	Cardozo 82'	Report		Stadium: Estadio Toluca 70-86; Referee: Eduardo Brizio

27 October 1996 12	Toros Neza	2–3	Santos Laguna	Ciudad Nezahualcóyotl
15:00	Osorio 67'; Mohamed 72'	Report	Borgetti 30'; Ramírez 70'; Galindo 77'	Stadium: Estadio Neza 86

3 November 1996 13	Toros Neza	2–6	UNAM	Ciudad Nezahualcóyotl
12:00	Mohamed 43'; Ruiz 44'	Report	Olalde 32', 58'; de Almeida 35', 52', 62'; Domizzi 75'	Stadium: Estadio Neza 86

9 November 1996 14	León	2–3	Toros Neza	León
15:00	Prátola 9'; García 82'	Report	Nildeson 56'; Lussenhoff 84'; Briseño 89'	Stadium: Estadio León

14 November 1996 15	Toros Neza	2–1	América	Ciudad Nezahualcóyotl
15:00	Arangio 50'; Nildeson 79'	Report	García Postigo 33'	Stadium: Estadio Neza 86

17 November 1996 16	Morelia	2–1	Toros Neza	Morelia
12:00	Figueroa 44'; Mora 70'	Report	Nildeson 2'	Stadium: Estadio Morelos

24 November 1996 17	Toros Neza	2–1	Guadalajara	Ciudad Nezahualcóyotl
12:00	Ruiz 59'; Nildeson 61'	Report	Vázquez 27'	Stadium: Estadio Neza 86

===== Repechaje =====
27 November 1996 First leg	León	1–2	Toros Neza	León
20:15	Tita 65'	Report	Arangio 62'; López 83'	Stadium: Estadio León

1 December 1996 Second leg	Toros Neza	2–1 (4–2 agg.)	León	Ciudad Nezahualcóyotl
12:00	Mohamed 1'; Vázquez 58'	Report	Torres 58'	Stadium: Estadio Neza 86

===== Liguilla =====
====== Quarter-finals ======
4 December 1996 First leg	Toros Neza	4–0	Atlante	Ciudad Nezahualcóyotl
15:30	Ruiz 10'; Nildeson 22', 31'; Herrera 72'	Report		Stadium: Estadio Neza 86

7 December 1996 Second leg	Atlante	2–5 (9–2 agg.)	Toros Neza	Mexico City
17:00	Malibrán 53'; Carbajal 83'	Report	Nildeson 28', 48'; Ruiz 41'; Arangio 44'; Herrera 75'	Stadium: Estadio Azteca

====== Semi-finals ======
11 December 1996 First leg	Toros Neza	0–2	Santos Laguna	Ciudad Nezahualcóyotl
15:30		Report	Adomaitis 57'; Caballero 58'	Stadium: Estadio Neza 86

15 December 1996 Second leg	Santos Laguna	3–2 (5–2 agg.)	Toros Neza	Torreón
16:00	Borgetti 31', 58', 69'	Report	Virchis 14'; Nildeson 89'	Stadium: Estadio Corona

=== Torneo Verano ===
==== League table ====
Pos	Team	Pld	W	D	L	GF	GA	GD	Pts	Qualification or relegation
1	América	17	11	4	2	27	12	+15	37	Advance to Liguilla (Playoffs)
2	Guadalajara (C)	17	9	7	1	27	16	+11	34	Advance to Liguilla (Playoffs)
3	Toros Neza	17	9	3	5	40	32	+8	30	Advance to Liguilla (Playoffs)
4	Necaxa	17	8	4	5	33	20	+13	28	Advance to Liguilla (Playoffs)
5	Atlante	17	8	4	5	23	19	+4	28	Advance to Liguilla (Playoffs)

Source: Liga MX
Rules for classification: 1) Points; 2) Goal difference; 3) Number of goals scored; 4) Head-to-head results between tied teams; 5) Number of goals scored away; 6) Highest relegation coefficient; 7) Fair Play points
(C) Champions

==== Results summary ====
Overall								Home						Away					
Pld	W	D	L	GF	GA	GD	Pts	W	D	L	GF	GA	GD	W	D	L	GF	GA	GD
17	9	3	5	40	32	+8	30	6	0	2	23	14	+9	3	3	3	17	18	−1

Source: Liga MX

== Statistics ==
=== Goals ===
Rank	Player	Position	Invierno	Verano	Copa México	Total
1	(Brazil) Nildeson	FW	15	5	0	20
2	(Chile) Rodrigo Ruiz	MF	5	9	4	18
3	(Argentina) Germán Arangio	FW	5	8	0	13
4	(Argentina) Antonio Mohamed	FW	8	3	1	12
5	(Mexico) Guillermo Vázquez	MF	2	5	3	10
6	(Mexico) Carlos Briseño	DF	1	5	0	6
6	(Argentina) Federico Lussenhoff	DF	1	4	1	6
6	(Argentina) Martín Vilallonga	FW	0	0	6	6
9	(Mexico) Javier Saavedra	MF	1	4	0	5
10	(Mexico) Jesús López	DF	2	2	0	4
11	(Mexico) Miguel Herrera	DF	2	1	0	3
11	(Mexico) Pedro Osorio	DF	1	2	0	3
11	(Mexico) Ramiro Romero	FW	0	1	2	3
14	(Mexico) Enrique Figueroa	MF	1	0	1	2
15	(Mexico) Humberto González	DF	0	1	0	1
15	(Mexico) Juan Manuel Rivera	MF	0	0	1	1
15	(Mexico) Manuel Virchis	MF	1	0	0	1
Total			45	50	19	114

=== Hat-tricks ===
Player	Against	Result	Date	Competition
(Brazil) Nildeson	Pachuca	5–2 (H)	1 September 1996	Primera División

=== Clean sheets ===
Rank	Name	Invierno	Verano	Copa México	Total
1	(Mexico) Pablo Larios	2	0	3	5
2	(Mexico) Juan Gutiérrez	1	0	0	1
Total		3	0	3	6
