= 1996–97 Mexican Primera División season =

55th professional season of the top-flight football league in Mexico

Primera División de México
- Season: 1996–97
- Champions: Inverno 1996: Santos Laguna (1st title); Verano 1997: Guadalajara (10th title)
- Relegated: Pachuca
- 1997 CONCACAF Champions' Cup: Santos Laguna; Guadalajara; Cruz Azul
- 1997 CONCACAF Cup Winners Cup: Necaxa; Cruz Azul
- Matches: 306
- Goals: 993 (3.25 per match)
- Top goalscorer: Invierno: Carlos Muñoz (15 goals); Verano: Gabriel Caballero; Lorenzo Sáez (13 goals)

The 1996–97 season included the 56th and 57th editions of the top professional division of Mexican football, known as Primera División de México. The season was divided into two short tournaments (Invierno 1996 and Verano 1997).

== Clubs ==
Location of the 1996-97 Primera División teams

Team	City	Stadium
América	Mexico City	Azteca
Atlante	Mexico City	Azteca
Atlas	Guadalajara, Jalisco	Jalisco
Celaya	Celaya, Guanajuato	Miguel Alemán Valdés
Cruz Azul	Mexico City	Azul
Guadalajara	Guadalajara, Jalisco	Jalisco
León	León, Guanajuato	León
Monterrey	Monterrey, Nuevo León	Tecnológico
Morelia	Morelia, Michoacán	Morelos
Necaxa	Mexico City	Azteca
Pachuca	Pachuca, Hidalgo	Hidalgo
Puebla	Puebla, Puebla	Cuauhtémoc
Santos Laguna	Torreón, Coahuila	Corona
Toluca	Toluca, State of Mexico	Nemesio Díez
Toros Neza	Nezahualcóyotl, State of Mexico	Neza 86
UAG	Zapopan, Jalisco	Tres de Marzo
UNAM	Mexico City	Olímpico Universitario
Veracruz	Veracruz, Veracruz	Luis "Pirata" Fuente

== Torneo Invierno ==
Invierno 1996 was the 56th edition of the Primera División de México and the first short tournament of the season. It started on August 9 and ended on November 24, 1996.

=== Regular phase ===
Group 1
Pos	Team	Pld	W	D	L	GF	GA	GD	Pts	Qualification
1	Atlante	17	12	2	3	30	11	+19	38	Directly qualified to the Liguilla (Playoffs)
2	Puebla	17	9	4	4	32	22	+10	31	Directly qualified to the Liguilla (Playoffs)
3	Toros Neza	17	8	0	9	30	36	−6	24	Qualified for the Repechage
4	Cruz Azul	17	5	5	7	26	26	0	20	
5	Veracruz	17	4	6	7	14	21	−7	18	

Source: MedioTiempo

Group 2
Pos	Team	Pld	W	D	L	GF	GA	GD	Pts	Qualification
1	Necaxa	17	8	5	4	24	19	+5	29	Directly qualified to the Liguilla (Playoffs)
2	León	17	5	8	4	24	19	+5	23	Qualified for the Repechage
3	América	17	4	5	8	24	27	−3	17	
4	Pachuca	17	3	6	8	25	36	−11	15	
5	Atlético Morelia	17	3	3	11	20	31	−11	12	

Source: MedioTiempo

Group 3
Pos	Team	Pld	W	D	L	GF	GA	GD	Pts	Qualification
1	Guadalajara	17	9	4	4	33	19	+14	31	Directly qualified to the Liguilla (Playoffs)
2	Toluca	17	9	3	5	26	15	+11	30	Directly qualified to the Liguilla (Playoffs)
3	Atlas	17	6	8	3	28	26	+2	26	Qualified for the Repechage
4	UNAM	17	4	6	7	23	27	−4	18	

Source: MedioTiempo

Group 4
Pos	Team	Pld	W	D	L	GF	GA	GD	Pts	Qualification
1	Santos Laguna	17	10	4	3	21	15	+6	34	Directly qualified to the Liguilla (Playoffs)
2	Monterrey	17	5	4	8	15	21	−6	19	Qualified for the Repechage
3	UAG	17	5	3	9	20	30	−10	18	
4	Celaya	17	5	2	10	19	33	−14	17	

Source: MedioTiempo

=== League table ===
Pos	Team	Pld	W	D	L	GF	GA	GD	Pts	Qualification or relegation
1	Atlante	17	12	2	3	30	11	+19	38	Advance to Liguilla (Playoffs)
2	Santos Laguna (C)	17	10	4	3	21	15	+6	34	Advance to Liguilla (Playoffs)
3	Guadalajara	17	9	4	4	33	19	+14	31	Advance to Liguilla (Playoffs)
4	Puebla	17	9	4	4	32	22	+10	31	Advance to Liguilla (Playoffs)
5	Toluca	17	9	3	5	26	15	+11	30	Advance to Liguilla (Playoffs)
6	Necaxa	17	8	5	4	24	19	+5	29	Advance to Liguilla (Playoffs)
7	Atlas	17	6	8	3	28	26	+2	26	Advance to Repechage
8	Toros Neza	17	8	0	9	30	36	−6	24	Advance to Repechage
9	León	17	5	8	4	24	19	+5	23	Advance to Repechage
10	Cruz Azul	17	5	5	7	26	26	0	20	
11	Monterrey	17	5	4	8	15	21	−6	19	Advance to Repechage
12	UNAM	17	4	6	7	23	27	−4	18	
13	Veracruz	17	4	6	7	14	21	−7	18	
14	UAG	17	5	3	9	20	30	−10	18	
15	América	17	4	5	8	24	27	−3	17	
16	Celaya	17	5	2	10	19	33	−14	17	
17	Pachuca	17	3	6	8	25	36	−11	15	Team is last in Relegation table
18	Atlético Morelia	17	3	3	11	20	31	−11	12	

Source: Liga MX
Rules for classification: 1) Points; 2) Goal difference; 3) Number of goals scored; 4) Head-to-head results between tied teams; 5) Number of goals scored away; 6) Highest relegation coefficient; 7) Fair Play points
(C) Champions

=== Results ===
Home \ Away	AME	ATE	ATS	ATM	CEL	CAZ	GDL	LEO	MTY	NEC	PAC	PUE	SAN	TOL	TRN	UAG	UNM	VER
América	—	1–2	–	5–1	–	2–1	–	–	2–0	1–1	–	–	–	1–2	–	2–2	2–2	–
Atlante	–	—	1–1	2–0	6–0	3–1	–	1–0	–	–	–	–	–	–	0–1	1–0	–	3–0
Atlas	2–1	–	—	–	2–1	–	2–2	–	–	–	5–1	2–2	1–1	1–1	–	–	2–2	1–2
Atlético Morelia	–	–	1–2	—	1–2	–	1–4	1–1	–	–	3–0	2–2	–	–	2–1	–	–	0–2
Celaya	0–2	–	–	–	—	–	3–0	–	0–0	1–2	3–2	0–1	0–2	0–1	–	–	0–1	–
Cruz Azul	–	–	4–1	1–1	2–3	—	–	2–2	–	–	1–2	3–1	–	–	3–0	–	–	0–0
Guadalajara	5–0	1–0	–	–	–	1–0	—	–	3–1	2–3	–	–	–	2–1	–	4–1	2–0	–
León	2–2	–	1–1	–	4–1	–	0–0	—	–	–	2–2	1–1	3–0	–	2–3	–	–	2–1
Monterrey	–	0–1	0–0	0–3	–	1–0	–	1–0	—	–	–	–	0–1	–	5–1	2–1	–	2–1
Necaxa	–	1–2	0–2	2–1	–	3–3	–	0–0	3–0	—	–	–	0–1	–	2–0	1–0	–	–
Pachuca	2–2	1–2	–	–	–	–	0–2	–	2–2	2–2	—	3–4	–	3–0	–	–	0–0	–
Puebla	1–0	2–3	–	–	–	–	1–1	–	1–0	1–2	–	—	–	2–1	–	5–2	2–1	–
Santos Laguna	1–0	1–0	–	2–1	–	0–2	1–1	–	–	–	2–1	1–0	—	–	–	1–2	–	–
Toluca	–	0–0	–	1–0	–	4–0	–	2–3	1–0	2–0	–	–	0–2	—	1–0	5–0	–	–
Toros Neza	2–1	–	6–2	–	1–2	–	2–1	–	–	–	5–2	0–3	2–3	–	—	–	2–6	2–0
UAG	–	–	0–1	1–0	5–2	1–1	–	0–1	–	–	1–1	–	–	–	1–2	—	–	1–0
UNAM	–	1–3	–	3–2	–	1–2	–	1–0	1–1	0–1	–	–	2–2	0–3	–	1–2	—	–
Veracruz	1–0	–	–	–	1–1	–	3–2	–	–	1–1	0–1	0–3	0–0	1–1	–	–	1–1	—

Updated to match(es) played on 24 November 1996. Source: RSSSF
Legend: Blue = home team win; Yellow = draw; Red = away team win.

=== Top goalscorers ===
Players sorted first by goals scored, then by last name. Only regular season goals listed.

Rank	Player	Club	Goals
1	(Spain) Carlos Muñoz	Puebla	15
2	(Mexico) Gabriel García	Guadalajara	13
2	(Mexico) Carlos Hermosillo	Cruz Azul	13
2	(Argentina) Lorenzo Sáez	Pachuca	13
5	(Mexico) Zague	Atlante	10
5	(Brazil) Nildeson	Toros Neza	10
7	(Mexico) Jared Borgetti	Santos Laguna	9
8	(Argentina) Cristian Domizzi	UNAM	8
8	(Mexico) Luis García	América	8
8	(Chile) Marco Antonio Figueroa	Morelia	8
8	(Brazil) Tita	León	8

Source: MedioTiempo

=== Final phase (Liguilla) ===
==== Repechage ====
November 27, 1996
20:00

León	1–2	Toros Neza
Tita 64'	Report	Arangio 61'; López 84'

Estadio León, León
Referee: Pascual Rebolledo (Veracruz)
December 1, 1996
15:00

Toros Neza	2–1	León
Mohamed 1'; Vázquez 59' (pen.)	Report	Torres 20'

Estadio Neza 86, Ciudad Nezahualcóyotl
Referee: Armando Archundia (Estado de México)

Toros Neza won 4–2 on aggregate.

November 27, 1996
20:00

Monterrey	1–5	Atlas
Castillo 88'	Report	Márquez 21', 90'; Lavallén 28'; Padilla 44'; Mascareño 61'

Estadio Tecnológico, Monterrey
Referee: Eduardo Brizio Carter (Mexico City)
November 30, 1996
20:45

Atlas	1–2	Monterrey
Duana 57' (pen.)	Report	Morales 47'; Salvador 58'

Estadio Jalisco, Guadalajara
Referee: León Padró Borja (Guanajuato)

Atlas won 6–3 on aggregate.

==== Bracket ====
Quarterfinals
2	Santos Laguna	1	3	4
7	Atlas	1	1	2
1	Atlante	0	2	2
8	Toros Neza	4	5	9
4	Puebla	0	2	2
5	Toluca	1	0	1
3	Guadalajara	0	2	2
6	Necaxa	2	1	3

Semifinals
2	Santos Laguna	2	3	5
8	Toros Neza	0	2	2
4	Puebla	1	3	4
6	Necaxa	3	4	7

Finals
2	Santos Laguna	0	4	4
6	Necaxa	1	2	3

==== Quarterfinals ====
December 4, 1996
16:00

Toros Neza	4–0	Atlante
Nildeson 22', 31'; Vázquez 77' (pen.); Ruiz 80'	Report

Estadio Neza 86, Ciudad Nezahualcóyotl
Referee: Felipe Ramos Rizo (Mexico City)
December 7, 1996
17:00

Atlante	2–5	Toros Neza
Malibrán 55'; Carbajal 83' (pen.)	Report	Nildeson 29', 47'; Ruiz 42'; Arangio 45'; Herrera 76'

Estadio Azteca, Mexico City
Referee: Eduardo Brizio Carter (Mexico City)

Toros Neza won 9–2 on aggregate.

December 4, 1996
20:45

Atlas	1–1	Santos Laguna
Larrosa 88'	Report	Borgetti 26'

Estadio Jalisco, Guadalajara
Referee: Gilberto Alcalá Pineda (Mexico City)
December 8, 1996
16:00

Santos Laguna	3–1	Atlas
Galindo 36' (pen.); Borgetti 59', 75'	Report	Duana 39'

Estadio Corona, Torreón
Referee: Armando Archundia (Estado de México)

Santos Laguna won 4–2 on aggregate.

December 4, 1996
20:45

Necaxa	2–0	Guadalajara
García Aspe 17'; Hernández 26'	Report

Estadio Azteca, Mexico City
Referee: Pascual Rebolledo (Veracruz)
December 8, 1996
16:00

Guadalajara	2–1	Necaxa
Sánchez 21'; Suárez 56' (pen.)	Report	Aguinaga 76' (pen.)

Estadio Jalisco, Guadalajara
Referee: Arturo Brizio Carter (Mexico City)

Necaxa won 3–2 on aggregate.

December 4, 1996
15:00

Toluca	1–2	Puebla
Rangel 43'	Report	Blanco 46' (o.g.); Marquinho 66'

Estadio Nemesio Díez, Toluca
Referee: Antonio Marrufo (Chihuahua)
December 7, 1996
19:00

Puebla	0–0	Toluca
	Report

Estadio Cuauhtémoc, Puebla
Referee: León Padró Borja (Guanajuato)

Puebla won 2–1 on aggregate.

==== Semifinals ====
December 11, 1996
16:00

Toros Neza	0–2	Santos Laguna
	Report	Adomaitis 56'; Caballero 58'

Estadio Neza 86, Ciudad Nezahualcóyotl
Referee: Pascual Rebolledo (Veracruz)
December 15, 1996
16:00

Santos Laguna	3–2	Toros Neza
Borgetti 30', 61', 79'	Report	Virchis 55'; Nidelson 90'

Estadio Corona, Torreón
Referee: Arturo Brizio Carter (Mexico City)

Santos Laguna won 5–2 on aggregate.

December 11, 1996
20:45

Necaxa	3–2	Puebla
Hernández 21'; Zárate 28'; García Aspe 71'	Report	Marquinho 37'; Muñoz 51'

Estadio Azteca, Mexico City
Referee: Arturo Brizio Carter (Mexico City)
December 15, 1996
12:00

Puebla	1–4	Necaxa
Guzmán 13'	Report	Aguinaga 35'; García Aspe 40' (pen.); Peláez 68'; Alvarado 84'

Estadio Cuauhtémoc, Puebla
Referee: Armando Archundia (Estado de México)

Necaxa won 7–3 on aggregate.

==== Finals ====
First leg

December 19, 1996
20:30

Necaxa	1–0	Santos Laguna
Galindo 77' (o.g.)	Report

Estadio Azteca, Mexico City
Referee: Gilberto Alcalá Pineda (Mexico City)

Necaxa:
GK	1	(Mexico) Nicolás Navarro
DF	20	(Mexico) José María Higareda
DF	15	(Mexico) Octavio Becerril
DF	3	(Chile) Eduardo Vilches
DF	2	(Paraguay) Juan Ramón Jara
MF	7	(Ecuador) Álex Aguinaga
MF	8	(Mexico) Alberto García Aspe (c)	(yellow card) 78'
MF	11	(Mexico) Felipe del Ángel Malibrán		(substituted off) 60'
MF	10	(Argentina) Sergio Zárate
FW	9	(Mexico) Ricardo Peláez	(yellow card) 84'
FW	11	(Mexico) Luis Hernández
Substitutions:
GK	19	(Mexico) Raúl Orvañanos Jr.
DF	4	(Mexico) Roberto Ruiz Esparza
DF	24	(Mexico) Jaime Hernández
MF	14	(Mexico) Gerardo Esquivel
MF	18	(Mexico) Jesús Eduardo Córdova
MF	21	(Uruguay) José Enrique García
FW	13	(Mexico) Edson Alvarado		(substituted on) 60'
Manager:
(Mexico) Manuel Lapuente

Santos Laguna:
GK	1	(Argentina) José Miguel
DF	13	(Mexico) Francisco Gabriel de Anda (c)	(yellow card) 66'
DF	4	(Mexico) Pedro Muñoz de la Torre
DF	5	(Mexico) José Guadalupe Rubio
DF	23	(Brazil) Ricardo Wagner De Souza
MF	16	(Mexico) Nicolás Ramírez
MF	6	(Mexico) Miguel España
MF	7	(Mexico) Benjamín Galindo
MF	10	(Argentina) Héctor Adomaitis
FW	58	(Mexico) Jared Borgetti
FW	8	(Argentina) Gabriel Caballero
Substitutions:
GK	20	(Mexico) Olaf Heredia
DF	2	(Mexico) Julio Cesar Algarin
DF	3	(Mexico) Salvador Mariscal
DF	17	(Mexico) Antonio González
MF	19	(Mexico) Saúl Quiñones
MF	24	(Mexico) Enrique Vizcarra
FW	21	(Chile) Cristián Montecinos
Manager:
(Mexico) Alfredo Tena

Second leg

December 22, 1996
16:00

Santos Laguna	4–2	Necaxa
Gabriel 35'; Caballero 37', 62'; Borgetti 82'	Report	Peláez 43'; Hernández 54'

Estadio Corona, Torreón
Referee: Arturo Brizio Carter (Mexico City)

Santos Laguna won 4–3 on aggregate.

Santos Laguna:
GK	1	(Argentina) José Miguel	(yellow card) 77'
DF	13	(Mexico) Francisco Gabriel de Anda (c)
DF	4	(Mexico) Pedro Muñoz de la Torre	(yellow card) 29'
DF	5	(Mexico) José Guadalupe Rubio		(substituted off) 61'
DF	23	(Brazil) Ricardo Wagner De Souza
MF	16	(Mexico) Nicolás Ramírez
MF	6	(Mexico) Miguel España	(yellow card) 31'
MF	7	(Mexico) Benjamín Galindo		(substituted off) 88'
MF	10	(Argentina) Héctor Adomaitis		(substituted off) 85'
FW	58	(Mexico) Jared Borgetti
FW	8	(Argentina) Gabriel Caballero
Substitutions:
GK	20	(Mexico) Olaf Heredia
DF	2	(Mexico) Julio Cesar Algarin
DF	3	(Mexico) Salvador Mariscal		(substituted on) 85'
DF	17	(Mexico) Antonio González
MF	15	(Mexico) Alberto García	(yellow card) 88'	(substituted on) 88'
MF	19	(Mexico) Saúl Quiñones
FW	21	(Chile) Cristián Montecinos		(substituted on) 61'
Manager:
(Mexico) Alfredo Tena

Necaxa:
GK	1	(Mexico) Nicolás Navarro
DF	20	(Mexico) José María Higareda	(yellow card) 49'	(substituted off) 85'
DF	15	(Mexico) Octavio Becerril
DF	3	(Chile) Eduardo Vilches
DF	2	(Paraguay) Juan Ramón Jara
MF	7	(Ecuador) Álex Aguinaga
MF	8	(Mexico) Alberto García Aspe (c)	(yellow card) 72'
MF	14	(Mexico) Gerardo Esquivel		(substituted off) 46'
MF	10	(Argentina) Sergio Zárate	(yellow card) 77' (red card) 82'
FW	9	(Mexico) Ricardo Peláez
FW	11	(Mexico) Luis Hernández
Substitutions:
GK	19	(Mexico) Raúl Orvañanos Jr.
DF	4	(Mexico) Roberto Ruiz Esparza
DF	24	(Mexico) Jaime Hernández
MF	11	(Mexico) Felipe del Ángel Malibrán		(substituted on) 85'
MF	18	(Mexico) Jesús Eduardo Córdova
MF	21	(Uruguay) José Enrique García
FW	13	(Mexico) Edson Alvarado		(substituted on) 46'
Manager:
(Mexico) Manuel Lapuente

Champions

1st title

== Torneo Verano ==
Verano 1997 was the 57th edition of the Primera División de México, and the second short tournament of the season. It started on January 11 and ended on May 4, 1997.

=== Regular phase ===
Group 1
Pos	Team	Pld	W	D	L	GF	GA	GD	Pts	Qualification
1	Toros Neza	17	9	3	5	40	32	+8	30	Directly qualified to the Liguilla (Playoffs)
2	Atlante	17	8	4	5	23	19	+4	28	Directly qualified to the Liguilla (Playoffs)
3	Cruz Azul	17	7	4	6	21	24	−3	25	
4	Puebla	17	4	8	5	15	18	−3	20	
5	Veracruz	17	2	4	11	17	31	−14	10	

Source: MedioTiempo

Group 2
Pos	Team	Pld	W	D	L	GF	GA	GD	Pts	Qualification
1	América	17	11	4	2	27	12	+15	37	Directly qualified to the Liguilla (Playoffs)
2	Necaxa	17	8	4	5	33	20	+13	28	Directly qualified to the Liguilla (Playoffs)
3	Atlético Morelia	17	6	7	4	26	23	+3	25	Qualified for the Repechage
4	León	17	5	8	4	21	18	+3	23	
5	Pachuca	17	5	2	10	24	32	−8	17	

Source: MedioTiempo

Group 3
Pos	Team	Pld	W	D	L	GF	GA	GD	Pts	Qualification
1	Guadalajara	17	9	7	1	27	16	+11	34	Directly qualified to the Liguilla (Playoffs)
2	UNAM	17	8	3	6	25	26	−1	27	Directly qualified to the Liguilla (Playoffs)
3	Toluca	17	5	6	6	26	21	+5	21	
4	Atlas	17	4	4	9	23	36	−13	16	

Source: MedioTiempo

Group 4
Pos	Team	Pld	W	D	L	GF	GA	GD	Pts	Qualification
1	Santos Laguna	17	8	2	7	27	28	−1	26	Directly qualified to the Liguilla (Playoffs)
2	UAG	17	5	5	7	26	24	+2	20	Qualified for the Repechage
3	Monterrey	17	5	3	9	25	38	−13	18	
4	Celaya	17	2	6	9	20	28	−8	12	

Source: MedioTiempo

=== League table ===
Pos	Team	Pld	W	D	L	GF	GA	GD	Pts	Qualification or relegation
1	América	17	11	4	2	27	12	+15	37	Advance to Liguilla (Playoffs)
2	Guadalajara (C)	17	9	7	1	27	16	+11	34	Advance to Liguilla (Playoffs)
3	Toros Neza	17	9	3	5	40	32	+8	30	Advance to Liguilla (Playoffs)
4	Necaxa	17	8	4	5	33	20	+13	28	Advance to Liguilla (Playoffs)
5	Atlante	17	8	4	5	23	19	+4	28	Advance to Liguilla (Playoffs)
6	UNAM	17	8	3	6	25	26	−1	27	Advance to Liguilla (Playoffs)
7	Santos Laguna	17	8	2	7	27	28	−1	26	Advance to Liguilla (Playoffs)
8	Atlético Morelia	17	6	7	4	26	23	+3	25	Advance to Repechage
9	Cruz Azul	17	7	4	6	21	24	−3	25	
10	León	17	5	8	4	21	18	+3	23	
11	Toluca	17	5	6	6	26	21	+5	21	
12	UAG	17	5	5	7	26	24	+2	20	Advance to Repechage
13	Puebla	17	4	8	5	15	18	−3	20	
14	Monterrey	17	5	3	9	25	38	−13	18	
15	Pachuca	17	5	2	10	24	32	−8	17	Team is last in Relegation table
16	Atlas	17	4	4	9	23	36	−13	16	
17	Celaya	17	2	6	9	20	28	−8	12	
18	Veracruz	17	2	4	11	17	31	−14	10	

Source: Liga MX
Rules for classification: 1) Points; 2) Goal difference; 3) Number of goals scored; 4) Head-to-head results between tied teams; 5) Number of goals scored away; 6) Highest relegation coefficient; 7) Fair Play points
(C) Champions

=== Results ===
Home \ Away	AME	ATE	ATS	ATM	CEL	CAZ	GDL	LEO	MTY	NEC	PAC	PUE	SAN	TOL	TRN	UAG	UNM	VER
América	—	–	3–0	–	4–0	–	0–0	3–2	–	–	1–0	2–0	2–1	–	1–1	–	–	2–1
Atlante	0–1	—	–	–	–	–	1–3	–	2–0	1–1	3–0	1–0	3–2	3–2	–	–	0–1	–
Atlas	–	2–0	—	1–2	–	2–2	–	1–1	3–3	0–2	–	–	–	–	1–4	6–4	–	–
Atlético Morelia	1–1	1–1	–	—	–	1–0	–	–	4–1	2–1	–	–	2–2	1–1	–	1–2	2–1	–
Celaya	–	0–0	3–0	0–1	—	1–1	–	0–0	–	–	–	–	–	–	2–2	1–1	–	1–1
Cruz Azul	2–1	1–1	–	–	–	—	1–1	–	2–1	1–4	–	–	2–0	3–2	–	0–3	0–1	–
Guadalajara	–	–	2–2	2–1	3–2	–	—	1–1	–	–	2–0	1–1	1–1	–	2–0	–	–	1–0
León	–	1–2	–	0–0	–	3–0	–	—	0–0	2–1	–	–	–	1–1	–	1–0	2–1	–
Monterrey	0–1	–	–	–	1–0	–	1–2	–	—	3–2	5–4	4–2	–	1–4	–	–	2–2	–
Necaxa	1–2	–	–	–	2–1	–	1–1	–	–	—	2–1	1–1	–	1–1	–	–	3–0	4–0
Pachuca	–	–	1–0	2–2	1–3	1–3	–	0–2	–	–	—	–	3–1	–	4–1	2–1	–	3–2
Puebla	–	–	1–2	2–1	2–1	1–0	–	1–1	–	–	1–0	—	1–2	–	1–1	–	–	0–0
Santos Laguna	–	–	2–1	–	3–2	–	–	3–2	1–2	1–3	–	–	—	2–1	2–0	–	2–0	2–0
Toluca	1–2	–	4–0	–	2–0	–	1–2	–	–	–	1–1	0–0	–	—	–	–	1–0	2–1
Toros Neza	–	1–2	–	4–2	–	1–2	–	4–2	5–1	3–2	–	–	–	2–1	—	3–2	–	–
UAG	0–0	1–2	–	–	–	–	1–2	–	3–0	0–2	–	0–0	3–0	1–1	–	—	2–2	–
UNAM	2–1	–	1–0	–	4–3	–	2–1	–	–	–	2–1	1–1	–	–	2–3	–	—	3–2
Veracruz	–	2–1	1–2	2–2	–	0–1	–	0–0	1–0	–	–	–	–	–	3–5	1–2	–	—

Updated to match(es) played on 4 May 1997. Source: RSSSF
Legend: Blue = home team win; Yellow = draw; Red = away team win.

=== Top goalscorers ===
Players sorted first by goals scored, then by last name. Only regular season goals listed.

Rank	Player	Club	Goals
1	(Argentina) Gabriel Caballero	Santos Laguna	12
1	(Argentina) Lorenzo Sáez	Pachuca	12
3	(Argentina) Cristian Domizzi	UNAM	11
4	(Brazil) Claudinho	Atlético Morelia	10
5	(Chile) Marco Antonio Figueroa	Atlético Morelia	9
5	(Mexico) Gustavo Nápoles	Guadalajara	9
7	(Cameroon) David Embe	UAG	8
7	(Mexico) Carlos Hermosillo	Cruz Azul	8
7	(Chile) Rodrigo Ruiz	Toros Neza	8
10	(Mexico) Luis García	América	7
10	(Mexico) Francisco Palencia	Cruz Azul	7
10	(Chile) Christian Torres	León	7
10	(Argentina) Sergio Zárate	Necaxa	7

Source: MedioTiempo

=== Final phase (Liguilla) ===
==== Repechage ====
May 7, 1997
20:30

UAG	2–0	Atlético Morelia
Yegros 66'; Embé 76'	Report

Estadio Tres de Marzo, Zapopan
Referee: Felipe Ramos Rizo (Mexico City)
May 11, 1997
12:00

Atlético Morelia	4–0	UAG
Figueroa 50', 83'; Juárez 60'; Claudinho 70'	Report

Estadio Morelos, Morelia
Referee: Arturo Brizio Carter (Mexico City)

Morelia won 4–2 on aggregate.

==== Bracket ====
Quarterfinals
2	Guadalajara	1	5	6
7	Santos Laguna	1	0	1
1	América	0	1	1
8	Atlético Morelia	1	3	4
3	Toros Neza	3	1	4
5	UNAM	1	2	3
4	Necaxa (s)	0	3	3
5	Atlante	2	1	3

Semifinals
2	Guadalajara (s)	0	1	1
8	Atlético Morelia	1	0	1
3	Toros Neza	1	3	4
4	Necaxa	2	1	3

Finals
1	Guadalajara	1	6	7
3	Toros Neza	1	1	2

==== Quarterfinals ====
May 14, 1997
16:00

Santos Laguna	1–1	Guadalajara
Caballero 18'	Report	Ramírez 50'

Estadio Corona, Torreón
Referee: León Padró Borja (Guanajuato)
May 18, 1997
12:00

Guadalajara	5–0	Santos Laguna
Vázquez 19', 57'; Zárate 29'; Arreola 80', 89'	Report

Estadio Jalisco, Guadalajara
Referee: Arturo Brizio Carter (Mexico City)

Guadalajara won 6–1 on aggregate.

May 14, 1997
16:00

Atlético Morelia	1–0	América
Juárez 88'	Report

Estadio Morelos, Morelia
Referee: Gilberto Alcalá Pineda (Mexico City)
May 17, 1997
20:45

América	1–3	Atlético Morelia
García 18' (pen.)	Report	Claudinho 40'; Soto 68'; Juárez 75'

Estadio Azteca, Mexico City
Referee: Armando Archundia (Estado de México)

Morelia won 4–1 on aggregate.

May 15, 1997
19:00

UNAM	1–3	Toros Neza
Sancho 89'	Report	Arangio 16', 37'; Ruiz 60'

Estadio Olímpico Universitario, Mexico City
Referee: Antonio Marrufo (Chihuahua)
May 18, 1997
15:00

Toros Neza	1–2	UNAM
Mohamed 68'	Report	Sancho 80', 87'

Estadio Neza 86, Ciudad Nezahualcóyotl
Referee: Gilberto Alcalá Pineda (Mexico City)

Toros Neza won 4–3 on aggregate.

May 14, 1997
20:45

Atlante	2–0	Necaxa
Zague 36', 56'	Report

Estadio Azteca, Mexico City
Referee: Pascual Rebolledo (Veracruz)
May 18, 1997
17:00

Necaxa	3–1	Atlante
Aguinaga 7'; García Aspe 55' (pen.); Peláez 65'	Report	Ubaldi 52'

Estadio Azteca, Mexico City
Referee: Felipe Ramos Rizo (Mexico City)

3–3 on aggregate. Necaxa advanced for being the higher seeded team.

==== Semifinals ====
May 22, 1997
17:00

Atlético Morelia	1–0	Guadalajara
Morales 54'	Report

Estadio Morelos, Morelia
Referee: Felipe Ramos Rizo (Mexico City)
May 25, 1997
12:00

Guadalajara	1–0	Atlético Morelia
Chávez 80'	Report

Estadio Jalisco, Guadalajara
Referee: Armando Archundia (Estado de México)

1–1 on aggregate. Guadalajara advanced for being the higher seeded team.

May 22, 1997
17:00

Necaxa	2–1	Toros Neza
Vázquez 11'; Zárate 84'	Report	Lussenhoff 54'

Estadio Azteca, Mexico City
Referee: León Padró Borja (Guanajuato)
May 25, 1997
16:00

Toros Neza	3–1	Necaxa
Vázquez 27' (pen.), 68'; Osorio 53'	Report	García Aspe 34' (pen.)

Estadio Neza 86, Ciudad Nezahualcóyotl
Referee: Arturo Brizio Carter (Mexico City)

Toros Neza won 4–3 on aggregate.

==== Finals ====
First leg

May 29, 1997
16:00

Toros Neza	1–1	Guadalajara
Briseño 79'	Report	Martínez 26'

Estadio Neza 86, Ciudad Nezahualcóyotl
Referee: Armando Archundia (Estado de México)

Toros Neza:
GK	1	(Mexico) Pablo Larios
DF	23	(Mexico) Javier Saavedra
DF	2	(Mexico) Humberto González
DF	3	(Mexico) Pedro Pablo Osorio		(substituted off) 60'
DF	4	(Mexico) Miguel Herrera	(yellow card) 39'
MF	25	(Argentina) Federico Lussenhoff
MF	13	(Mexico) Jesús López Meneses		(substituted off) 60'
MF	6	(Mexico) Guillermo Vázquez (c)
MF	10	(Chile) Rodrigo Ruiz
FW	11	(Argentina) Antonio Mohamed
FW	7	(Argentina) Germán Arangio		(substituted off) 74'
Substitutions:
GK	22	(Mexico) Juan Gutiérrez Gutiérrez
DF	8	(Mexico) Humberto Romero
MF	14	(Mexico) Manuel Virchis		(substituted on) 60'
MF	24	(Mexico) José Juan Rivera
MF	28	(Mexico) Miguel Ángel Murillo
FW	15	(Mexico) Ramiro Romero		(substituted on) 74'
FW	20	(Mexico) Carlos Briseño		(substituted on) 60'
Manager:
(Mexico) Enrique Meza

Guadalajara:
GK	23	(Mexico) Martín Zúñiga
DF	2	(Mexico) Noe Zárate	(yellow card) 86'
DF	4	(Mexico) Claudio Suárez
DF	8	(Mexico) Joel Sánchez
DF	5	(Mexico) Camilo Romero
MF	14	(Mexico) Felipe de Jesús Robles	(yellow card) 34'	(substituted off) 71'
MF	7	(Mexico) Ramón Ramírez		(substituted off) 80'
MF	6	(Mexico) Alberto Coyote (c)
MF	15	(Mexico) Paulo Chávez
MF	11	(Mexico) Manuel Martínez		(substituted off) 80'
FW	10	(Mexico) Gustavo Nápoles
Substitutions:
GK	1	(Mexico) Eduardo Fernández
DF	21	(Mexico) Héctor Castro
DF	58	(Mexico) Guillermo Hernández		(substituted on) 80'
MF	18	(Mexico) Jorge Arreola		(substituted on) 71'
MF	30	(Mexico) Missael Espinoza
FW	9	(Mexico) Ignacio Vázquez
FW	16	(Mexico) Gabriel García Hernández	(yellow card) 81'	(substituted on) 80'
Manager:
(Brazil) Ricardo Ferretti

Second leg

June 1, 1997
12:00

Guadalajara	6–1	Toros Neza
Nápoles 50', 55', 74', 83'; Chávez 51'; Martínez 62'	Report	Arangio 79'

Estadio Jalisco, Guadalajara
Referee: Arturo Brizio Carter (Mexico City)

Guadalajara won 7–2 on aggregate.

Guadalajara:
GK	23	(Mexico) Martín Zúñiga
DF	2	(Mexico) Noe Zárate
DF	4	(Mexico) Claudio Suárez	(red card) 70'
DF	8	(Mexico) Joel Sánchez
DF	5	(Mexico) Camilo Romero
MF	7	(Mexico) Ramón Ramírez		(substituted off) 85'
MF	6	(Mexico) Alberto Coyote (c)
MF	15	(Mexico) Paulo Chávez
MF	11	(Mexico) Manuel Martínez		(substituted off) 70'
FW	9	(Mexico) Ignacio Vázquez		(substituted off) 66'
FW	10	(Mexico) Gustavo Nápoles	(yellow card) 48'
Substitutions:
GK	1	(Mexico) Eduardo Fernández
DF	58	(Mexico) Guillermo Hernández		(substituted on) 70'
MF	14	(Mexico) Felipe de Jesús Robles		(substituted on) 66'
MF	18	(Mexico) Jorge Arreola
MF	30	(Mexico) Missael Espinoza		(substituted on) 85'
FW	16	(Mexico) Gabriel García Hernández
FW	27	(Mexico) Sergio Pacheco
Manager:
(Brazil) Ricardo Ferretti

Toros Neza:
GK	1	(Mexico) Pablo Larios
DF	23	(Mexico) Javier Saavedra
DF	2	(Mexico) Humberto González
DF	25	(Argentina) Federico Lussenhoff
DF	4	(Mexico) Miguel Herrera
MF	6	(Mexico) Guillermo Vázquez (c)
MF	13	(Mexico) Jesús López Meneses		(substituted off) 37'
MF	14	(Mexico) Manuel Virchis		(substituted off) 76'
MF	10	(Chile) Rodrigo Ruiz
FW	20	(Mexico) Carlos Briseño	(yellow card) 29'	(substituted off) 46'
FW	11	(Argentina) Antonio Mohamed
Substitutions:
GK	22	(Mexico) Juan Gutiérrez Gutiérrez
DF	3	(Mexico) Pedro Pablo Osorio
DF	8	(Mexico) Humberto Romero
MF	28	(Mexico) Miguel Ángel Murillo		(substituted on) 46'
MF	30	(Mexico) Carlos García
FW	7	(Argentina) Germán Arangio		(substituted on) 37'
FW	15	(Mexico) Ramiro Romero		(substituted on) 76'
Manager:
(Mexico) Enrique Meza

Champions

10th title

== Relegation ==
Pos.	Team	Pts.	Pld.	Ave.
14	Puebla	119	104	1.1442
15	Toluca	116	104	1.1153
16	Veracruz	113	104	1.0865
17	Atlético Morelia	103	104	0.9903
18	Pachuca	32	34	0.9411
