= 2019–20 Liga MX season =

73rd professional season of the top-flight football league in Mexico

Liga MX
- Season: 2019–20
- Champions: Apertura: Monterrey (5th title); Clausura: Tournament cancelled
- Relegated: Veracruz (disaffiliated)
- Champions League: Monterrey; Cruz Azul; América; León
- Matches: 261
- Goals: 755 (2.89 per match); Apertura: 495 (2.89 per match); Clausura: 260 (2.89 per match)
- Top goalscorer: Apertura: Alan Pulido; Mauro Quiroga (12 goals); Clausura: Jonathan Rodríguez (9 goals)
- Biggest home win: Apertura: Necaxa 7–0 Veracruz (3 August 2019); Clausura: UNAM 4–0 Atlético San Luis (9 February 2020); Morelia 4–0 Querétaro (13 March 2020)
- Biggest away win: Apertura: Veracruz 0–5 Querétaro (27 August 2019); Veracruz 0–5 América (8 November 2019); Clausura: Atlético San Luis 0–3 Juárez (28 February 2020); América 0–3 Necaxa (29 February 2020); Juárez 1–4 León (8 March 2020)
- Highest scoring: Apertura: Necaxa 7–0 Veracruz (3 August 2019); León 4–3 Guadalajara (17 August 2019); Cruz Azul 5–2 América (5 October 2019); Morelia 6–1 Juárez (31 October 2019); Clausura: Juárez 4–4 UNAM (16 January 2020)
- Longest winning run: Apertura: 4 matches Santos Laguna; Clausura: 6 matches Cruz Azul
- Longest unbeaten run: Apertura: 8 matches UANL; Clausura: 8 matches Cruz Azul
- Longest winless run: Apertura: 14 matches Veracruz; Clausura: 10 matches Monterrey
- Longest losing run: Apertura: 6 matches Veracruz; Clausura: 5 matches Atlas
- Highest attendance: Apertura: 63,908; América vs Guadalajara (28 September 2019); Clausura: 45,516; Atlas vs Guadalaajara (7 March 2020)
- Lowest attendance: Apertura: 0 (Note: Estadio Alfonso Lastras was banned two matches after fans invaded the pitch due to violent clashes in the stands in Atlético San Luis' match against Querétaro. As a result, the fixtures at the stadium had to be played behind closed doors.); Atlético San Luis vs América (29 October 2019); Atlético San Luis vs Necaxa (9 November 2019); Clausura: 0 Atlas vs Tijuana (31 January 2020)
- Total attendance: Apertura: 3,894,127; Clausura: 1,974,057
- Average attendance: Apertura: 22,773; Clausura: 23,784
- Stats are from the regular season only Source: Liga MX (Apertura); Liga MX (Clausura)

The 2019–20 Liga MX season (known as the Liga BBVA MX for sponsorship reasons) was the 73rd professional season of the top-flight football league in Mexico. The season was divided into two championships—the Torneo Apertura and the Torneo Clausura—each in an identical format and each contested by the same nineteen teams. The Apertura tournament began on 19 July 2019.

On 15 March 2020, the Mexican Football Federation suspended the Clausura seasons of Liga MX, Ascenso MX and Liga MX Femenil indefinitely due to the coronavirus pandemic.

On 22 May 2020, the season was cancelled due to the COVID-19 pandemic affecting the country. While no official champion was crowned for that season officially, Cruz Azul and León were awarded the Clausura champions and runners-up positions ("MEX2" and "MEX4") respectively for purposes of filling the 2021 CONCACAF Champions League, as the first and second-placed teams of the regular season at the time of suspension.

== Clubs ==
The following nineteen teams competed this season. Atlético San Luis was promoted from the Ascenso MX. Veracruz was to be relegated to the Ascenso MX initially after accumulating the lowest point coefficient last season, but instead they offered to pay MXN$120 million to remain in Liga MX. The team, however, was eventually disaffiliated by the FMF at the end of the Apertura 2019 tournament. Lobos BUAP's franchise in the first division was purchased by FC Juárez. Lobos BUAP will be able to participate in the Ascenso MX but will remain frozen for one year.

=== Stadiums and locations ===
América & Cruz Azul	Atlas	Atlético San Luis	Guadalajara	Juárez	León
Estadio Azteca	Estadio Jalisco	Estadio Alfonso Lastras	Estadio Akron	Olímpico Benito Juárez	Estadio León
Capacity: 87,000	Capacity: 55,110	Capacity: 25,709	Capacity: 45,364	Capacity: 19,703	Capacity: 31,297
Monterrey	Morelia	Necaxa	Pachuca	Puebla	Querétaro
Estadio BBVA	Estadio Morelos	Estadio Victoria	Estadio Hidalgo	Estadio Cuauhtémoc	Estadio Corregidora
Capacity: 53,500	Capacity: 34,795	Capacity: 23,851	Capacity: 27,512	Capacity: 51,726	Capacity: 33,162
Santos Laguna	Tijuana	Toluca	UANL	UNAM	
Estadio Corona	Estadio Caliente	Estadio Nemesio Díez	Estadio Universitario	Estadio Olímpico Universitario	
Capacity: 29,237	Capacity: 27,333	Capacity: 31,000	Capacity: 41,886	Capacity: 48,297	

Locations of the 2019–20 Liga MX teams
Greater Mexico City Liga MX football clubs

=== Personnel and kits ===
Team	Chairman	Head coach	Captain	Kit manufacturer	Shirt sponsor(s)
América	Santiago Baños	(Mexico) Miguel Herrera	(Mexico) Paul Aguilar	Nike	AT&T
Atlas	Pedro Portilla	(Mexico) Rafael Puente Jr.	(Paraguay) Osvaldo Martínez	Adidas	MoPlay
Atlético San Luis	Alberto Marrero	(Mexico) Guillermo Vázquez	(Spain) Mario Abrante	Pirma	Canel's
Cruz Azul	Guillermo Álvarez Cuevas	(Uruguay) Robert Siboldi	(Mexico) José de Jesús Corona	Joma	Cemento Cruz Azul
Guadalajara	Amaury Vergara	(Mexico) Luis Fernando Tena	(Mexico) Jesús Molina	Puma	Caliente
Juárez	Guillermo Cantú	(Mexico) Gabriel Caballero	(Uruguay) Jonathan Lacerda	Carrara	S-Mart
León	Jesús Martínez Murguia	(Mexico) Ignacio Ambriz	(Mexico) Luis Montes	Pirma	Cementos Fortaleza
Monterrey	Duilio Davino	(Argentina) Antonio Mohamed	(Argentina) José María Basanta	Puma	AT&T
Morelia	Mauricio Lanz González	(Argentina) Pablo Guede	(Chile) Rodrigo Millar	Pirma	Caliente
Necaxa	Ernesto Tinajero Flores	(Mexico) Alfonso Sosa	(United States) Ventura Alvarado	Charly	Rolcar
Pachuca	Jesús Martínez Patiño	(Uruguay) Paulo Pezzolano	(Mexico) Jorge Hernández	Charly	Cementos Fortaleza
Puebla	Manuel Jiménez García	(Peru) Juan Reynoso	(Mexico) Daniel Arreola	Umbro	AT&T
Querétaro	Rodrigo Ares de Parga	(Mexico) Víctor Manuel Vucetich	(Mexico) Luis Romo	Puma	Banco Multiva
Santos Laguna	Dante Elizalde	(Uruguay) Guillermo Almada	(Mexico) Jonathan Orozco	Charly	Soriana
Tijuana	Jorge Hank Inzunsa	(Bolivia) Gustavo Quinteros	(Uruguay) Diego Rodríguez	Charly	Caliente
Toluca	Francisco Suinaga	(Mexico) José Manuel de la Torre	(Mexico) Alfredo Talavera	Under Armour	Citibanamex
UANL	Miguel Ángel Garza	(Brazil) Ricardo Ferretti	(Argentina) Guido Pizarro	Adidas	Cemex
UNAM	Leopoldo Silva Gutiérrez	(Spain) Míchel González	(Mexico) David Cabrera	Nike	DHL
Veracruz	Fidel Kuri Grajales	(Mexico) Enrique López Zarza	(Mexico) Carlos Salcido	Charly	Winpot Casino

=== Managerial changes ===
Team	Outgoing manager	Manner of departure	Date of vacancy	Replaced by	Date of appointment	Position in table	Ref.
Pre-Apertura changes
Veracruz	(Mexico) José Luis González China (Interim)	End of tenure as caretaker	3 June 2019	(Mexico) Enrique Meza	4 June 2019	Preseason	
UNAM	(Argentina) Bruno Marioni	Sacked	16 May 2019	(Spain) Míchel González	16 May 2019	Preseason	
Apertura
Puebla	(Mexico) José Luis Sánchez Solá	Sacked	17 August 2019	(Mexico) Octavio Becerril (Interim)	17 August 2019	19th	
Morelia	(Argentina) Javier Torrente	Sacked	18 August 2019	(Mexico) Esteve Padilla (Interim)	18 August 2019	15th	
Morelia	(Mexico) Esteve Padilla (Interim)	End of tenure as caretaker	23 August 2019	(Argentina) Pablo Guede	21 August 2019 (Note: Although appointed on 21 August 2019, Guede would not immediately take charge. Due to paperwork, his first match was delayed to 27 August 2019 vs Atlético San Luis.)	15th	
Puebla	(Mexico) Octavio Becerril (Interim)	End of tenure as caretaker	24 August 2019	(Peru) Juan Reynoso	23 August 2019	18th	
Veracruz	(Mexico) Enrique Meza	Resigned	28 August 2019	(Mexico) José González (Interim)	29 August 2019	19th	
Cruz Azul	(Portugal) Pedro Caixinha	Mutual agreement	2 September 2019	(Mexico) Joaquín Moreno (Interim)	2 September 2019	11th	
Atlético San Luis	(Mexico) Alfonso Sosa	Sacked	4 September 2019	(Uruguay) Gustavo Matosas	9 September 2019	10th	
Veracruz	(Mexico) José González (Interim)	End of tenure as caretaker	4 September 2019	(Mexico) Enrique López Zarza	4 September 2019	19th	
Cruz Azul	(Mexico) Joaquín Moreno (Interim)	End of tenure as caretaker	6 September 2019	(Uruguay) Robert Siboldi	6 September 2019	11th	
Guadalajara	(Mexico) Tomás Boy	Sacked	26 September 2019	(Mexico) Luis Fernando Tena	26 September 2019	15th	
Monterrey	(Uruguay) Diego Alonso	Sacked	30 September 2019	(Mexico) José Treviño (Interim)	1 October 2019	12th	
Monterrey	(Mexico) José Treviño (Interim)	End of tenure as caretaker	9 October 2019	(Argentina) Antonio Mohamed	9 October 2019	14th	
Atlético San Luis	(Uruguay) Gustavo Matosas	Mutual agreement	27 October 2019	(Mexico) Luis García (Interim)	27 October 2019	14th	
Toluca	(Argentina) Ricardo Lavolpe	Sacked	11 November 2019	(Mexico) José Rodríguez Valenzuela (Mexico) José Manuel Cruzalta (Interim)	11 November 2019	17th	
Pre-Clausura changes
Toluca	(Mexico) José Rodríguez Valenzuela (Mexico) José Manuel Cruzalta (Interim)	End of tenure as caretaker	1 December 2019	(Mexico) José Manuel de la Torre	18 November 2019 (Note: Although appointed on 18 November 2019, the period as coach began on 1 December 2019, after the end of Apertura 2019 regular season.)	Preseason	
Pachuca	(Argentina) Martín Palermo	Mutual agreement	24 November 2019	(Uruguay) Paulo Pezzolano	25 November 2019	Preseason	
Tijuana	(Colombia) Oscar Pareja	Mutual agreement	25 November 2019	(Bolivia) Gustavo Quinteros	6 December 2019	Preseason	
Necaxa	(Mexico) Guillermo Vázquez	End of contract	8 December 2019	(Mexico) Alfonso Sosa	13 December 2019	Preseason	
Atlético San Luis	(Mexico) Luis García (Interim)	End of tenure as caretaker	15 December 2019	(Mexico) Guillermo Vázquez	15 December 2019	Preseason	
Clausura changes
Atlas	(Argentina) Leandro Cufré	Sacked	29 January 2020	(Mexico) Omar Flores (Interim)	29 January 2020	14th	
Atlas	(Mexico) Omar Flores (Interim)	End of tenure as caretaker	1 February 2020	(Mexico) Rafael Puente Jr.	30 January 2020 (Note: Although appointed on 30 January 2020, Puente would not immediately take charge. Due to fixture schedule, his first match was delayed to 6 February 2020 vs Monarcas Morelia.)	14th	

== Torneo Apertura ==
The Apertura 2019 season began on 19 July 2019 and ended on 15 December 2019. The defending champions were Tigres UANL, having won their seventh title.

=== Regular phase ===
==== League table ====
Pos	Team	Pld	W	D	L	GF	GA	GD	Pts	Qualification or relegation
1	Santos Laguna	18	11	4	3	40	25	+15	37	Advance to Liguilla (Note: The first 8 places in the table qualified for the Liguilla. The last ranked team in the relegation table could qualify for the Liguilla in the Apertura tournament.)
2	León	18	9	6	3	38	23	+15	33	Advance to Liguilla
3	UANL	18	8	8	2	26	14	+12	32	Advance to Liguilla
4	Querétaro	18	9	4	5	31	19	+12	31	Advance to Liguilla
5	Necaxa	18	9	4	5	33	23	+10	31	Advance to Liguilla
6	América	18	8	7	3	32	22	+10	31	Advance to Liguilla
7	Morelia	18	8	3	7	31	26	+5	27	Advance to Liguilla
8	Monterrey (C)	18	8	3	7	27	23	+4	27	Advance to Liguilla
9	Pachuca	18	7	4	7	32	26	+6	25	
10	Guadalajara	18	7	4	7	28	28	0	25	
11	Tijuana	18	7	3	8	26	36	−10	24	
12	Cruz Azul	18	5	8	5	25	24	+1	23	
13	UNAM	18	6	5	7	21	20	+1	23	
14	Atlas	18	6	3	9	19	26	−7	21	
15	Atlético San Luis	18	6	2	10	22	31	−9	20	
16	Juárez	18	5	3	10	17	27	−10	18	
17	Toluca	18	4	5	9	16	26	−10	17	
18	Puebla	18	4	5	9	20	31	−11	17	
19	Veracruz (Note: Veracuz were disaffiliated by the Mexican Football Federation following various financial problems and incidents off the field. As a result, no club was relegated after the Clausura 2020. Relegation was originally intended to resume at the end of the 2020–21 season, however it was suspended for at least five years after the Ascenso MX was folded.) (D)	18	1	5	12	11	45	−34	8	Team disaffiliated by the FMF

Source: Liga MX
Rules for classification: 1) Points; 2) Goal difference; 3) Number of goals scored; 4) Head-to-head results between tied teams; 5) Number of goals scored away; 6) Highest relegation coefficient; 7) Fair Play points
(C) Champions; (D) Disaffiliated

==== Positions by round ====
Leader and qualification to Liguilla
Qualification to Liguilla
Last place in table

Team ╲ Round	1	2	3	4	5	6	7	8	9	10	11	12	13	14	15	16	17	18	19
Santos Laguna	1	1	1	1	3	1	2	2†	3	1	1	1	2	1	3	1	1	1	1
León	4	6	8	12†	10	6	7	7	5	2	3	4	5	4	4	6	6	4	2
UANL	2	8	5	4	4	4	4	5	6	8†	9	7	6	5	6	5	4	5	3
Querétaro	7	7	2	2	1	3	1	1	2†	3	4	6	3	3	2	4	3	6	4
Necaxa	10	15	7	11	9	5	6	4	1	4	2	2	1	2	1	2†	2	2	5
América	3	5	3	3	2	2	3	3	4	5	5	3	4	6	5	3	5	3	6†
Morelia	14	18	13	13	15	15	15	13	8	6	6	11†	13	8	9	8	7	7	7
Monterrey	13	17	12	9	6	9	5	8	11	7	7	12	14	12	13†	12	11	8	8
Pachuca	15	13	17	16	13	11	12	14	15	12	8	5	7†	9	10	13	10	11	9
Guadalajara	19	9	10	6	11	12	14†	15	12	14	15	17	17	16	16	16	15	12	10
Tijuana	5	4	9	7	12†	13	8	12	14	15	13	10	10	11	8	7	8	9	11
Cruz Azul	9	11	15	10	8	8	10	11	13	13	14	14	12	14	12	11	13†	14	12
UNAM	6	2	4	8	5	7	11	9	9	9	10†	8	8	10	11	9	9	10	13
Atlas	8	3	6	5	7	10	9	6	10	11	11	9	9	7	7	10	12	13†	14
Atlético San Luis	18	10	11†	15	14	14	13	10	7	10	12	13	11	13	14	14	14	15	15
Juárez	12	19	14	14	16	17†	18	16	16	16	17	18	18	15	17	17	16	16	16
Toluca	17	14	18	18	17	16	16	18	18	17	16	15	15	17†	15	15	17	17	17
Puebla	16	16†	16	17	18	18	17	17	17	18	18	16	16	18	18	18	18	18	18
Veracruz	11†	12	19	19	19	19	19	19	19	19	19	19	19	19	19	19	19	19	19

Source: Liga MX
Notes: † indicates team rested that round

=== Results ===
Teams played every other team once (either at home or away), with one team resting each round, completing a total of 19 rounds.

Home \ Away	AMÉ	ATL	ASL	CAZ	GUA	JUÁ	LEÓ	MON	MOR	NEC	PAC	PUE	QUE	SAN	TIJ	TOL	UNL	UNM	VER
América	—	—	—	—	4–1	—	—	4–2	1–0	—	1–1	2–0	2–2	1–2	3–1	—	—	1–1	—
Atlas	3–0	—	1–2	1–3	—		—	—	—	0–2	—	—	2–0	1–2	—	0–1	1–1	—	—
Atlético San Luis	0–1	—	—	—	—	—	—	1–0	1–1	0–2	—	—	0–2 (Note: Match was suspended after fans invaded the pitch due to violent clashes in the stands.)	2–3	2–3	—	1–1	0–2	—
Cruz Azul	5–2	—	3–1	—	1–1	2–0	1–0	1–1	2–3	—	—	1–1	—	—	—	1–1	—	—	—
Guadalajara	—	1–0	3–0	—	—	—	—	—	—	1–2	2–4	—	3–2	—	0–1	—	2–0	1–1	3–1
Juárez	1–1	—	1–2	—	1–2	—	—	1–0	—	—	—	—	0–2	—	3–0	2–0	1–2	—	2–0
León	0–0	1–1	3–2	—	4–3	3–1	—	—	1–1	—	—	—	—	2–2	—	4–0	—	—	1–1
Monterrey	—	2–0	—	—	1–1	—	3–2	—	—	0–2	—	3–2	—	—	—	2–0	0–2	2–0	1–1
Morelia	—	0–1	—	—	1–0	6–1	—	0–1	—	2–3	—	3–2	—	2–2	—	—	—	2–0	1–0
Necaxa	2–2	—	—	0–0	—	0–0	2–4	—	—	—	1–2	—	—	3–0	3–2	1–1	—	—	7–0
Pachuca	—	3–1	0–2	2–0	—	0–1	1–3	2–3	1–2	—	—	—	—	—	4–1	—	—	2–0	—
Puebla	—	0–1	1–3	—	1–1	2–1	2–1	—	—	3–0	0–4	—	—	—	1–3	—	—	1–1	—
Querétaro	—	—	—	3–0	—	—	0–4	2–1	3–1	1–2	2–1	1–1	—	—	—	—	0–0	3–0	—
Santos Laguna	—	—	—	3–1	3–0	3–0	—	2–1	—	—	2–2	4–1	1–0	—	4–1	—	—	—	5–0
Tijuana	—	2–2	—	3–2	—	—	1–2	0–4	3–2	—	—	—	1–1	—	—	—	1–1	1–0	2–0
Toluca	0–1	—	3–1	—	1–3	—	—	—	0–2	—	2–0	1–1	0–2	2–2	2–0	—	—	—	—
UANL	1–1	—	—	1–1	—	—	1–1	—	4–2	3–1	0–0	0–1	—	4–0	—	1–0	—	—	—
UNAM	—	5–1	—	1–1	—	1–1	1–2	—	—	2–0	—	—	—	2–1	—	2–1	0–1	—	2–0
Veracruz	0–5	1–2	1–2	0–0	—	—	—	—	—	—	3–3	1–0	0–5	—	—	1–1	1–3	—	—

Source: Liga MX
Legend: Blue = home team win; Yellow = draw; Red = away team win.

=== Individual statistics ===
==== Top goalscorers ====
Players sorted first by goals scored, then by last name.

Rank	Player	Club	Goals
1	(Mexico) Alan Pulido	Guadalajara	12
1	(Argentina) Mauro Quiroga	Necaxa	12
3	(Argentina) Rogelio Funes Mori	Monterrey	10
3	(France) André-Pierre Gignac	UANL	10
5	(Argentina) Julio Furch	Santos Laguna	9
5	(Argentina) Nicolas Ibañez	Atlético San Luis	9
5	(Uruguay) Brian Lozano	Santos Laguna	9
8	(Argentina) Franco Jara	Pachuca	8
8	(Mexico) José Juan Macías	León	8
8	(Mexico) Henry Martín	América	8

Source: Liga MX

==== Top assists ====
Players sorted first by assists, then by last name.

Rank	Player	Club	Assists
1	(Ecuador) Miller Bolaños	Tijuana	9
2	(Uruguay) Brian Lozano	Santos Laguna	6
2	(Argentina) Víctor Malcorra	UNAM	6
2	(Colombia) Roger Martínez	América	6
5	(Mexico) Luis Ángel Mendoza	Morelia	5
5	(Ecuador) Kevin Mercado	Necaxa	5
5	(Mexico) Luis Montes	León	5
5	(Mexico) Fernando Navarro	León	5
5	(Argentina) Mauro Quiroga	Necaxa	5
5	(Mexico) Luis Reyes	Atlético San Luis	5
5	(Argentina) Rubens Sambueza	Pachuca	5
5	(Peru) Yoshimar Yotún	Cruz Azul	5

Source: Soccerway

==== Hat-tricks ====
Player	For	Against	Result	Date
(France) André-Pierre Gignac	UANL	Necaxa	3–1	10 August 2019
(Argentina) Ismael Sosa	León	Necaxa	4–2	21 September 2019
(Paraguay) Sebastián Ferreira	Morelia	Cruz Azul	3–2	19 October 2019
(Mexico) Henry Martín	América	Veracruz	5–0	8 November 2019

=== Attendance ===
Pos	Team	Total	High	Low	Average	Change
1	UANL	366,808	41,602	37,653	40,756	−1.3%
2	Monterrey	335,315	44,972	30,635	37,257	−12.3%
3	América	277,534	63,908	19,771	30,837	+20.8%
4	Guadalajara	274,468	39,313	22,781	30,496	+0.7%
5	Atlas	238,896	40,700	16,915	26,544	−3.1%
6	Tijuana	233,397	26,933	21,333	25,933	+9.5%
7	León	211,060	26,632	18,782	23,451	+6.9%
8	Santos Laguna	206,737	28,016	18,622	22,971	+1.6%
9	Querétaro	203,168	29,329	16,975	22,574	+46.8%
10	UNAM	184,583	30,458	10,423	20,509	−5.2%
11	Pachuca	179,894	26,003	15,462	19,988	−3.4%
12	Puebla	151,454	27,611	12,544	18,932	−2.1%
13	Morelia	169,837	26,019	13,674	18,871	−8.4%
14	Juárez	166,037	19,710	14,655	18,449	+237.1%^{1}
15	Cruz Azul	159,876	30,568	7,176	17,764	−0.7%
16	Atlético San Luis	148,646	25,187	0	16,516	+17.8%^{1}
17	Toluca	146,179	25,744	12,533	16,242	−8.9%
18	Necaxa	135,115	23,851	10,688	15,013	−8.5%
19	Veracruz	105,143	18,940	4,725	11,683	−16.4%
	League total	3,894,127	63,908	0	22,773	+0.4%

Source: Liga MX
Notes:
Only regular season listed
1: Team played in Ascenso MX last season.

==== Highest and lowest ====
Highest attendance					Lowest attendance			
Week	Home	Score	Away	Attendance	Home	Score	Away	Attendance
1	UANL	4–2	Morelia	41,580	Toluca	0–2	Querétaro	13,015
2	Guadalajara	2–0	UANL	39,313	Veracruz	3–3	Pachuca	14,620
3	Monterrey	3–2	León	37,058	Necaxa	7–0	Veracruz	12,846
4	UANL	3–1	Necaxa	41,553	Cruz Azul	2–0	Juárez	12,469
5	Monterrey	2–0	Toluca	39,783	Puebla	0–4	Pachuca	14,524
6	UANL	1–1	América	41,589	Veracruz	1–2	Atlético San Luis	9,670
7 (Note: Round scheduled for midweek.)	Monterrey	2–0	UNAM	35,662	Veracruz	0–5	Querétaro	7,322
8	UANL	1–1	León	41,498	Necaxa	3–2	Tijuana	11,861
9	América	1–1	UNAM	38,317	Puebla	1–3	Atlético San Luis	14,735
10	Monterrey	3–2	Puebla	33,060	Necaxa	2–4	León	17,757
11	UANL	0–1	Puebla	38,638	Cruz Azul	1–1	Monterrey	12,412
12	América	4–1	Guadalajara	63,908	Veracruz	1–1	Toluca	8,698
13	UANL	4–0	Santos Laguna	41,426	Toluca	1–1	Puebla	12,533
14	Monterrey	1–1	Guadalajara	38,217	Veracruz	1–3	UANL	7,838
15	UANL	0–2	Cruz Azul	41,886	Morelia	2–2	Santos Laguna	13,674
16	UANL	1–0	Toluca	37,653	Atlético San Luis	0–1	América	0 (Note: Estadio Alfonso Lastras was banned two matches after fans invaded the pitch due to violent clashes in the stands in Atlético San Luis' match against Querétaro. As a result, the fixtures at the stadium had to be played behind closed doors.)
17	Monterrey	1–1	Veracruz	30,635	Necaxa	1–2	Pachuca	11,868
18	UANL	0–0	Pachuca	41,269	Atlético San Luis	0–2	Necaxa	0
19	Monterrey	2–0	Atlas	40,242	Cruz Azul	3–1	Atlético San Luis	7,176

Source: Liga MX

=== Final phase ===
==== Bracket ====
Quarter-finals
3	UANL	2	2	4
6	América	1	4	5
2	León	3	1	4
7	Morelia	3	2	5
4	Querétaro	0	2	2
5	Necaxa	3	3	6
1	Santos Laguna	2	1	3
8	Monterrey	5	1	6

Semi-finals
6	América (s)	0	2	2
7	Morelia	2	0	2
5	Necaxa	1	0	1
8	Monterrey	2	1	3

Finals
6	América	1	2	3 (2)
8	Monterrey (p)	2	1	3 (4)

- Teams were re-seeded each round.
- Team with more goals on aggregate after two matches advanced.
- Away goals rule was applied in the quarter-finals and semi-finals, but not the final.
- In the quarter-finals and semi-finals, if the two teams were tied on aggregate and away goals, the higher seeded team advanced.
- In the final, if the two teams were tied after both legs, the match went to extra time and, if necessary, a shoot-out.
- Both finalists qualified to the 2021 CONCACAF Champions League (champions as MEX1, runners-up as MEX3).

==== Quarterfinals ====
Team 1	Agg.	Team 2	1st leg	2nd leg
Monterrey	6–3	Santos Laguna	5–2	1–1
Morelia	5–4	León	3–3	2–1
América	5–4	UANL	1–2	4–2
Necaxa	6–2	Querétaro	3–0	3–2

==== Semifinals ====
Team 1	Agg.	Team 2	1st leg	2nd leg
Monterrey	3–1	Necaxa	2–1	1–0
Morelia	2–2 (s)	América	2–0	0–2

==== Finals ====
Team 1	Agg.	Team 2	1st leg	2nd leg
Monterrey	3–3 (4–2 p)	América	2–1	1–2 (a.e.t.)

== Torneo Clausura ==
The Clausura 2020 season began on 10 January 2020.

On 15 March 2020, the Mexican Football Federation suspended the Liga MX, Ascenso MX and Liga MX Femenil indefinitely due to the coronavirus pandemic. On 22 May 2020, the Clausura 2020 was officially cancelled due to the COVID-19 pandemic affecting the country and no champion was crowned. The two 2021 CONCACAF Champions League berths were given to the top two teams in the regular season at the time of suspension (1st place as MEX2, 2nd place as MEX4).

=== Regular phase ===
==== League table ====
Pos	Team	Pld	W	D	L	GF	GA	GD	Pts	Qualification
1	Cruz Azul	10	7	1	2	24	14	+10	22	Qualification to 2021 CONCACAF Champions League
2	León	10	7	0	3	23	14	+9	21	Qualification to 2021 CONCACAF Champions League
3	Santos Laguna	10	5	2	3	14	14	0	17	
4	América	10	5	2	3	11	11	0	17	
5	Guadalajara	10	4	4	2	13	11	+2	16	
6	UNAM	10	4	3	3	20	19	+1	15	
7	UANL	10	4	2	4	13	10	+3	14	
8	Juárez	10	4	2	4	20	18	+2	14	
9	Morelia	10	4	2	4	17	16	+1	14	
10	Puebla	10	4	2	4	7	7	0	14	
11	Pachuca	10	4	2	4	11	12	−1	14	
12	Querétaro	10	4	2	4	13	15	−2	14	
13	Atlético San Luis	10	3	4	3	11	15	−4	13	
14	Necaxa	10	3	2	5	17	16	+1	11	
15	Toluca	10	2	4	4	16	18	−2	10	
16	Tijuana	10	2	3	5	10	16	−6	9	
17	Atlas	10	3	0	7	10	17	−7	9	
18	Monterrey	10	0	5	5	10	17	−7	5	

Source: Liga MX
Rules for classification: 1) Points; 2) Goal difference; 3) Number of goals scored; 4) Head-to-head results between tied teams; 5) Number of goals scored away; 6) Highest relegation coefficient; 7) Fair Play points

==== Positions by round ====
Qualification to Champions League
Last place in table

Team ╲ Round	1	2	3	4	5	6	7	8	9	10
Cruz Azul	15	18	12	11	7	6	4	1	1	1
León	1	6	2	1	1	3	2	3	2	2
Santos Laguna	13	9	15	14	13	9	8	6	9	3
América	7	1	8	6	4	2	1	2	3	4
Guadalajara	2	2	4	7	10	13	10	8	5	5
UNAM	5	3	1	4	2	1	3	5	4	6
UANL	9	16	10	13	8	10	13	12	12	7
Juárez	18	17	6	5	3	5	7	4	6	8
Morelia	16	14	17	18	15	16	12	15	14	9
Puebla	12	8	13	16	16	17	14	13	13	10
Pachuca	14	15	18	12	17	11	9	11	8	11
Querétaro	17	7	3	2	5	4	5	7	7	12
Atlético San Luis	8	4	5	8	12	7	6	9	10	13
Necaxa	11	5	7	3	6	8	11	10	11	14
Toluca	6	10	9	10	9	12	15	14	15	15
Tijuana	4	12	11	15	14	14	16	16	16	16
Atlas	3	11	14	9	11	15	17	17	17	17
Monterrey	10	13	16	17	18	18	18	18	18	18

Source: Liga MX

=== Results ===
Teams were originally planned to play every other team once (either at home or away), completing a total of 17 rounds. Only 10 rounds were able to be completed before the league was suspended.

Home \ Away	AMÉ	ATL	ASL	CAZ	GUA	JUÁ	LEÓ	MON	MOR	NEC	PAC	PUE	QUE	SAN	TIJ	TOL	UNL	UNM
América	—	2–0	—	0–1	—	1–3	—	—	—	0–3	—	—	—	—	—	—	1–0	—
Atlas	—	—	—	—	1–2	—	—	—	1–3	—	0–2	0–1	—	—	2–1	—	—	—
Atlético San Luis	—	—	—	2–1	2–2		3–1	—	—	—	—	0–1	—	—	—	—	—	—
Cruz Azul	—	1–2	—	—	—	—	—	—	—	—	3–1	—	—	3–0	4–2	—	2–1	—
Guadalajara	—	—	—	1–2	—	2–0	2–0	1–1	—	—	—	—	—	—	—	2–2	—	—
Juárez	—	—	—	—	—	—	1–4	—	3–0	2–1	—	—	—	1–2	—	—	—	4–4
León	—	—	—	—	—	—	—	3–1	—	2–1	3–0	—	3–1	—	—	—	—	3–1
Monterrey	0–1	—	2–2	—	—	1–1	—	—	2–2	—	—	—	1–2	—	—	—	—	—
Morelia	—	—	—	2–4	—	—	1–2	—	—	—	—	—	4–0	—	1–1	0–1	—	—
Necaxa	—	—	1–1	—	—	—	—	2–2	1–2	—	—	2–0	2–3	—	—	—	—	—
Pachuca	—	—	—	—	0–0	—	—	—	—	—	—	1–0	1–1	1–0	—	—	2–0	—
Puebla	0–1	—	—	—	—	—	—	—	—	—	—	—	0–1	2–2	—	2–0	0–0	—
Querétaro	1–2	—	0–1	—	—	—	—	—	—	—	—	—	—	—	3–0	1–1	—	—
Santos Laguna	—	1–0	—	—	—	—	3–2	—	—	2–1	—	—	—	—	—	—	2–1	1–1
Tijuana	0–0	—	—	—	1–0	—	—	—	—	—	3–2	0–1	—	2–1	—	1–1	—	—
Toluca	—	2–3	—	3–3	—	—	—	2–0	—	2–3	—	—	—	—	—	—	—	2–3
UANL	—	2–1	0–0	—	3–0	3–2	—	—	—	—	—	—	—	—	—	—	—	3–0
UNAM	3–3	—	4–0	—	—	—	—	1–0	1–2	—	2–1	—	—	—	—	—	—	—

Source: Liga MX
Legend: Blue = home team win; Yellow = draw; Red = away team win.

=== Individual statistics ===
==== Top goalscorers ====
Players sorted first by goals scored, then by last name.

Rank	Player	Club	Goals
1	(Uruguay) Jonathan Rodríguez	Cruz Azul	9
2	(Uruguay) Leonardo Fernández	Toluca	8
2	(France) André-Pierre Gignac	UANL	8
2	(Ecuador) Ángel Mena	León	8
5	(Argentina) Franco Jara	Pachuca	7
6	(Paraguay) Darío Lezcano	Juárez	6
7	(Argentina) Nicolás Ibáñez	Atlético San Luis	5
7	(Argentina) Ariel Nahuelpán	Querétaro	5
7	(Argentina) Mauro Quiroga	Necaxa	5
7	(Mexico) Aldo Rocha	Morelia	5

Source: Liga MX

==== Top assists ====
Players sorted first by assists, then by last name.

Rank	Player	Club	Assists
1	(Mexico) Roberto Alvarado	Cruz Azul	5
1	(Mexico) Pablo Barrera	UNAM	5
3	(Ecuador) Jefferson Intriago	Juárez	4
4	(Colombia) Fabián Castillo	Querétaro	3
4	(Mexico) Elías Hernández	Cruz Azul	3
4	(Mexico) Luis Montes	León	3
4	(Paraguay) Richard Sánchez	América	3
8	21 players		2

Source: Soccerway

==== Hat tricks ====
Player	For	Against	Result	Date
(France) André-Pierre Gignac	UANL	UNAM	3–0	29 February 2020

=== Attendance ===
Pos	Team	Total	High	Low	Average	Change
1	UANL	166,165	41,615	41,328	41,541	+1.9%
2	Monterrey	192,238	44,312	31,716	38,448	+3.2%
3	Guadalajara	149,200	40,106	35,677	37,300	+22.3%
4	UNAM	132,440	43,560	18,030	26,488	+29.2%
5	América	102,820	29,477	20,816	25,705	−16.6%
6	Tijuana	153,098	30,233	16,333	25,516	−1.6%
7	Puebla	112,786	31,203	17,580	22,557	+19.1%
8	Atlas	111,317	45,516	0	22,263	−16.1%
9	Santos Laguna	85,237	23,474	20,169	21,309	−7.2%
10	Querétaro	82,759	34,050	10,732	20,690	−8.3%
11	Pachuca	100,790	23,978	15,928	20,158	+0.9%
12	Morelia	100,463	25,276	15,136	20,093	+6.5%
13	Toluca	79,327	21,802	16,795	19,832	+22.1%
14	Cruz Azul	94,506	27,220	13,586	18,901	+6.4%
15	Juárez	93,761	19,703	17,773	18,752	+1.6%
16	Atlético San Luis	74,751	24,186	13,424	18,688	+13.2%
17	León	73,705	19,444	17,764	18,426	−21.4%
18	Necaxa	68,694	16,120	11,881	13,739	−8.5%
	League total	1,974,057	45,516	0	23,784	+4.4%

Source: Liga MX
Notes:
Only regular season listed

==== Highest and lowest ====
Highest attendance					Lowest attendance			
Week	Home	Score	Away	Attendance	Home	Score	Away	Attendance
1	UANL	0–0	Atlético San Luis	41,609	Necaxa	2–2	Monterrey	12,106
2	Monterrey	2–2	Morelia	44,312	Querétaro	3–0	Tijuana	10,737
3	UANL	2–1	Atlas	41,328	Cruz Azul	3–0	Santos Laguna	13,586
4	Monterrey	1–2	Querétaro	37,668	Atlas	2–1	Tijuana	0
5	UANL	3–0	Guadalajara	41,613	Puebla	2–2	Santos Laguna	17,580
6	Guadalajara	1–2	Cruz Azul	40,106	Necaxa	2–3	Querétaro	12,778
7	Monterrey	0–1	América	43,636	León	2–1	Necaxa	17,764
8	UANL	3–0	UNAM	41,615	Atlético San Luis	0–3	Juárez	13,424
9	Atlas	1–2	Guadalajara	45,516	Cruz Azul	4–2	Tijuana	14,434
10 (Note: Only the first two matches of Week 10 were played with fans in the stands. The league later decided to play the rest of the week's matches behind close doors due to the coronavirus pandemic.)	Morelia	4–0	Querétaro	17,432	Tijuana	3–2	Pachuca	16,333

Source: Liga MX

== Relegation ==
Pos	Team	'17 A Pts	'18 C Pts	'18 A Pts	'19 C Pts	'19 A Pts	'20 C Pts	Total Pts	Total Pld	Avg	GD	Relegation
1	UANL	32	28	29	37	29	14	169	95	1.7789	+65	
2	América	30	29	33	29	28	17	166	95	1.7474	+50	
3	León	26	22	18	41	32	21	160	95	1.6842	+41	
4	Cruz Azul	27	22	36	30	22	22	159	95	1.6737	+39	
5	Monterrey	37	29	30	30	26	5	157	95	1.6526	+41	
6	Santos Laguna	18	29	30	22	34	17	150	95	1.5789	+28	
7	Toluca	29	36	26	25	16	10	142	95	1.4947	+12	
8	Pachuca	19	23	24	28	24	14	132	95	1.3895	+19	
9	Morelia	29	24	25	13	24	14	129	95	1.3579	–2	
10	Necaxa	24	22	14	29	28	11	128	95	1.3474	+19	
11	Tijuana	21	25	17	28	21	9	121	95	1.2737	–22	
12	UNAM	13	24	30	17	20	15	119	95	1.2526	–2	
13	Puebla	16	23	19	24	17	14	114	95	1.2000	–28	
14	Querétaro	16	18	26	11	28	14	113	95	1.1895	–23	
15	Guadalajara	18	15	20	18	22	16	109	95	1.1474	–16	
16	Juárez	0	0	19	20	15	14	68	61	1.1148	–29	
17	Atlético San Luis	Ascenso MX				17	13	30	27	1.1111	–13	
18	Atlas	25	18	11	19	18	9	100	95	1.0526	–44	
~~19~~	Veracruz (D)	0	0	0	0	~~8~~	~~0~~	~~8~~	~~18~~	~~0.4444~~	~~–34~~	Team disaffiliated by the FMF

Last update: 15 March 2020
Rules for relegation: 1) Relegation coefficient; 2) Goal difference; 3) Number of goals scored; 4) Head-to-head results between tied teams; 5) Number of goals scored away; 6) Fair Play points
D = Disaffiliated .
Source: Liga MX

1. 2017–18 accumulated points are not counted towards their relegation coefficient.
2. 2017–18 and 2018–19 points were accumulated as Lobos BUAP.
3. 2017–18 and 2018–19 points are not counted towards their relegation coefficient.
4. Veracuz were disaffiliated by the Mexican Football Federation following various financial problems and incidents off the field. As a result, no club will be relegated after the Clausura 2020. Relegation will resume at the end of the 2020–21 season.
5. Due to the club's disaffiliation, points and goals obtained in the matches played against Veracruz in the Apertura 2019 have been docked.

== Aggregate table ==
The aggregate table (the sum of points of both the Apertura and Clausura tournaments) would have been used to determine the participants of the 2020 Leagues Cup had that tournament not been cancelled due to the COVID-19 pandemic.

Pos	Team	Pld	W	D	L	GF	GA	GD	Pts	Qualification or relegation
1	León	28	16	6	6	61	37	+24	54	2021 CONCACAF Champions League (Note: As Clausura 2nd place (MEX4))
2	Santos Laguna	28	16	6	6	54	39	+15	54	
3	América	28	13	9	6	43	33	+10	48	2021 CONCACAF Champions League (Note: As Apertura runners-up (MEX3))
4	UANL	28	12	10	6	39	24	+15	46	
5	Cruz Azul	28	12	9	7	49	38	+11	45	2021 CONCACAF Champions League (Note: As Clausura 1st place (MEX2))
6	Querétaro	28	13	6	9	44	34	+10	45	
7	Necaxa	28	12	6	10	50	39	+11	42	
8	Morelia	28	12	5	11	48	42	+6	41	
9	Guadalajara	28	11	8	9	41	39	+2	41	
10	Pachuca	28	11	6	11	43	38	+5	39	
11	UNAM	28	10	8	10	41	39	+2	38	
12	Atlético San Luis	28	9	6	13	33	46	−13	33	
13	Tijuana	28	9	6	13	36	52	−16	33	
14	Monterrey (C)	28	8	8	12	37	40	−3	32	2021 CONCACAF Champions League (Note: As Apertura champions (MEX1))
15	Juárez	28	9	5	14	37	45	−8	32	
16	Puebla	28	8	7	13	27	38	−11	31	
17	Atlas	28	9	3	16	29	43	−14	30	
18	Toluca	28	6	9	13	32	44	−12	27	
19	Veracruz (Note: Veracuz were disaffiliated by the Mexican Football Federation following various financial problems and incidents off the field. As a result, no club was relegated after the Clausura 2020. Relegation will resume at the end of the 2020–21 season.) (D)	18	1	5	12	11	45	−34	8	Team disaffiliated by the FMF

Source: Liga MX
Rules for classification: 1) Points; 2) Goal difference; 3) Number of goals scored; 4) Head-to-head results between tied teams; 5) Number of goals scored away; 6) Highest relegation coefficient; 7) Fair Play points
(C) Champions; (D) Disaffiliated

== See also ==
- 2019–20 Ascenso MX season
- 2019–20 Liga MX Femenil season
