= Parmalat Cup =

- Founded: 1993
- Abolished: 1998
- Last champions: (Uruguay) Peñarol (4th title)
- Most championships: (Uruguay) Peñarol (4 titles)

The Parmalat Cup was a football tournament for clubs that was played five times in the 1990s.

It was first held in 1993, and ran for four consecutive years, before a final edition took place in 1998. The vast majority of the participants were sponsored by Parmalat, an Italian dairy company.

The first event was hosted in Parma and won by Peñarol, who were to win two more editions, including the 1998 tournament held in Uruguay. The following events, were hosted in a variety of countries including United States, Brazil and Mexico.

== Winners ==
=== Summaries ===
Year	Host	Winner	Score	Runner-up	Third place	Score	Fourth place
1993	(Italy) Parma	(Uruguay) Peñarol	0–0; 3–2 (p)	(Brazil) Palmeiras	(Italy) Parma	3–2	(Argentina) Boca Juniors
1994	(Brazil) São Paulo	(Uruguay) Peñarol	1–1; 4–3 (p)	(Brazil) Palmeiras	(Brazil) Juventude	4–0	(Portugal) Benfica
1995	(United States) New Jersey	(Italy) Parma	3–1	(Argentina) Boca Juniors	United States	2–1	(Portugal) Benfica
1996	(Brazil) Caxias do Sul	(Uruguay) Peñarol	1–0	(Brazil) Juventude	Only two teams participated		
1997	(Mexico) Ciudad Nezahualcóyotl	(Mexico) Toros Neza	3–2	(Chile) Universidad Católica	(Italy) Parma lost the semifinal vs. Toros Neza.		
1998	(Uruguay) Rivera	(Uruguay) Peñarol	1–0	(Brazil) Juventude	Only two teams participated		

=== Titles by club ===
Team	Titles
(Uruguay) Peñarol	4
(Italy) Parma	1
(Mexico) Toros Neza	1

=== Participation by club ===
Participation(s)	Team(s)
4	(Uruguay) Peñarol
3	(Brazil) Juventude (Italy) Parma
2	(Portugal) Benfica (Argentina) Boca Juniors (Brazil) Palmeiras
1	(Chile) Audax Italiano (Hungary) Parmalat FC (Mexico) Toros Neza; United States (Chile) Universidad Católica
