= Antonio Mohamed =

Argentine footballer and manager

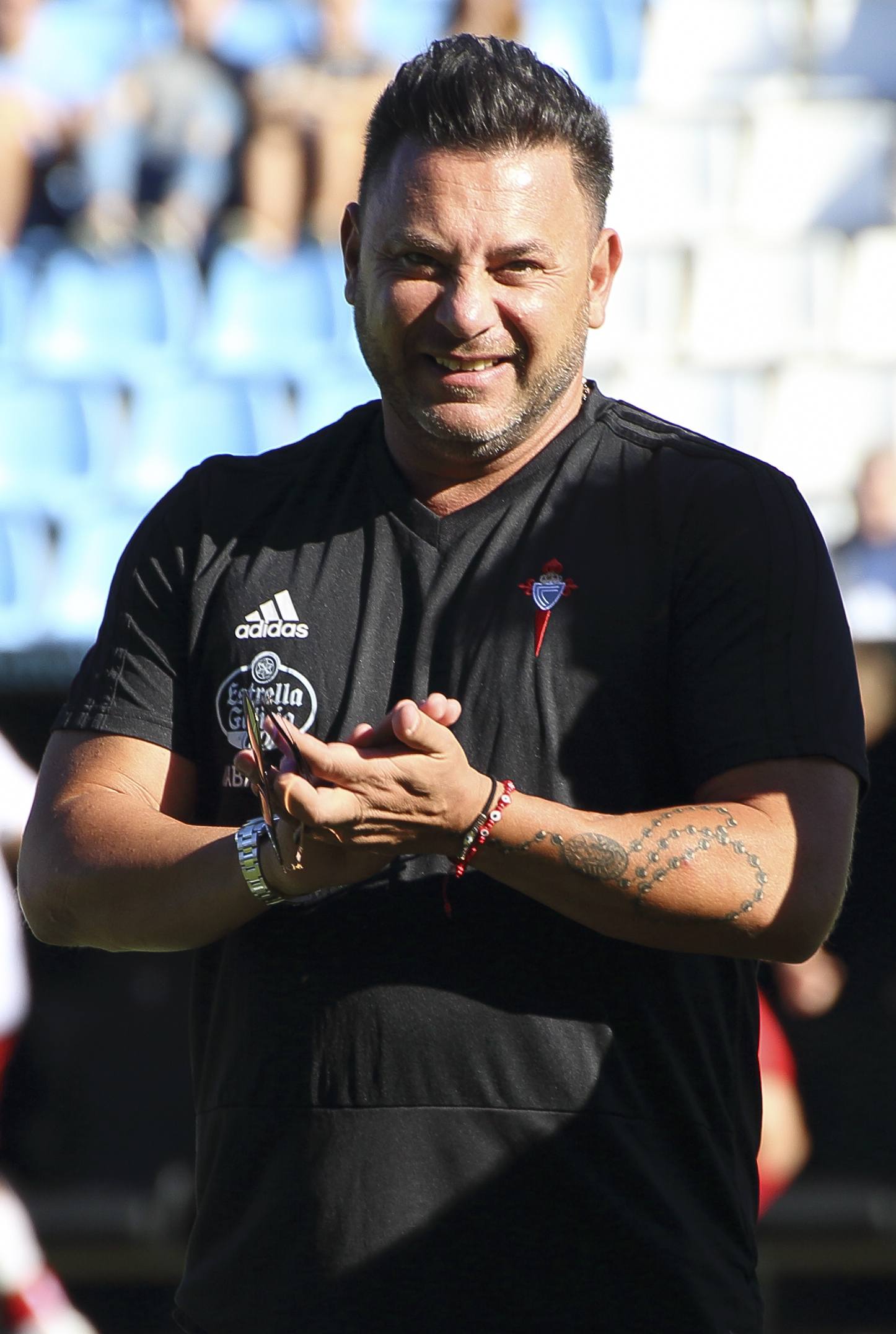
- Mohamed managing Celta in 2018

Personal information
- Full name: Ricardo Antonio Mohamed Matijević
- Date of birth: 2 April 1970 (age 56)
- Place of birth: Buenos Aires, Argentina
- Height: 1.75 m (5 ft 9 in)
- Position: Striker

Team information
- Current team: Toluca (Head Coach)

Youth career
- Vélez Sársfield

Senior career*
Years	Team	Apps	(Gls)
1988–1991	Huracán	109	(41)
1991–1993	Fiorentina	0	(0)
1991–1992	→ Boca Juniors (loan)	16	(4)
1992–1993	→ Independiente (loan)	26	(2)
1993–1998	Toros Neza	180	(50)
1998	América	2	(0)
1998–2000	Monterrey	58	(12)
2000	Marte	20	(12)
2001	Irapuato	16	(2)
2001–2002	Atlante	24	(1)
2002	Celaya	14	(1)
2003	Zacatepec	16	(1)
Total		481	(126)

International career
1989	Argentina U20	2	(0)
1991	Argentina	4	(1)

Managerial career
- 2003–2004: Zacatepec
- 2004: Morelia
- 2004–2005: Querétaro
- 2005: Chiapas
- 2005–2006: Huracán
- 2006–2007: Huracán
- 2007–2008: Veracruz
- 2008–2010: Colón
- 2010–2011: Independiente
- 2011–2013: Tijuana
- 2013: Huracán
- 2014: América
- 2015–2018: Monterrey
- 2018: Celta Vigo
- 2019: Huracán
- 2019–2020: Monterrey
- 2022: Atlético Mineiro
- 2023: Pumas UNAM
- 2025–: Toluca
- * Club domestic league appearances and goals

Ricardo Antonio Mohamed Matijević (born 2 April 1970), nicknamed El Turco (The Turk), is an Argentine football manager and former player. He is the current head coach of Liga MX club Toluca.

As a player, Mohamed is best known for his time with Huracán in Argentina and Toros Neza in Mexico. As a manager, he has overseen fifteen clubs across four countries. His career achievements include winning the Copa Sudamericana with Independiente and securing five league championships in Mexico with four different clubs: Tijuana, América, Monterrey, and Toluca.

== Club career ==
Born in Buenos Aires, Argentina, Mohamed made his first team debut with Huracán in 1988 in the Primera B Nacional. After establishing himself as a regular starter, he played a pivotal role in the club's promotion during the 1989–90 season, scoring the decisive goal against Los Andes in the championship-clinching match.

Mohamed made his Primera División debut on 19 August 1990 in a 2–2 draw against Deportivo Mandiyú. He enjoyed a prolific debut season, netting ten goals as Huracán narrowly missed out on Copa Libertadores qualification, finishing just one point short of the play-off positions in the Clausura tournament. In 1991, Mohamed earned a high-profile move to Serie A side Fiorentina for US$1.2 million, though he never appeared for the Italian club. Instead, he was loaned to Boca Juniors and Independiente in his native Argentina before departing permanently in 1993 to join Toros Neza in Mexico.

Mohamed reached the peak of his career with Toros Neza, helping the club reach the final of the Verano '97 season against Guadalajara. He featured alongside notable players including Nildeson, Rodrigo Ruiz, and Germán Arangio during this successful campaign. In 1998, following a brief stint with Club América that yielded two Copa Libertadores appearances, Mohamed transferred to Monterrey. He spent his final years moving between several Mexican clubs — Marte, Irapuato, Atlante, Celaya and Zacatepec — before retiring in 2003 at the age of 33.

== International career ==
An Argentine international, Mohamed made his debut with the national team in a friendly match against Hungary on 19 February 1991, with Argentina winning the match 2–0. He made four appearances in total, scoring one goal. He was a part of the Argentina squad that won the Copa América tournament in 1991.

== Managerial career ==
=== Early career ===
Shortly after retiring, Mohamed took up coaching at his last club Zacatepec in the Ascenso MX, reaching the semifinals of the Liguilla and leaving the club after they changed name to Leones de Morelos. He took over Liga MX side Monarcas Morelia on 23 February 2004, replacing Rubén Omar Romano.

Mohamed was sacked by Morelia in June 2004, after only 13 matches. He subsequently took over Querétaro in the second division before replacing José Luis Trejo at the helm of Chiapas in February 2005.

Mohamed was relieved of his duties in April 2005, and was subsequently replaced by Fernando Quirarte. He subsequently returned to his first club Huracán, achieving a top tier promotion in 2007.

Mohamed resigned in September 2007, and returned to Mexico in the following month after being named Veracruz manager. He resigned the following 27 January, after only eight matches.

On 19 March 2008, Mohamed was appointed in charge of Colón de Santa Fe back in his home country. In September 2010, after attracting the interest of major clubs in the country, he resigned.

=== Independiente ===
On 4 October 2010, Mohamed was confirmed as new manager of Independiente. In December, he led side that won the Copa Sudamericana tournament, defeating Brazilian side Goiás 5–3 on penalties in the finals.

Mohamed announced his resignation from the club on 4 September 2011, after a poor start of the season.

=== Tijuana ===
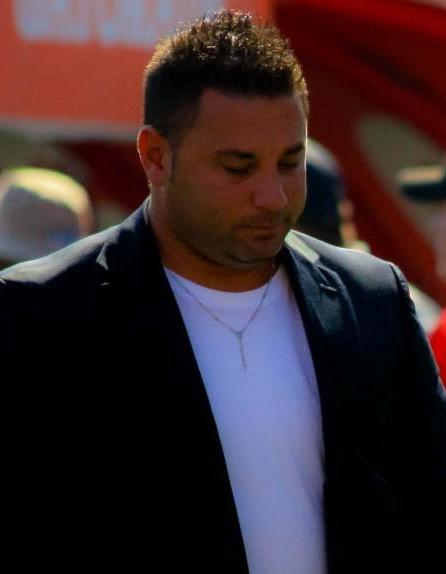
Mohamed as Tijuana manager in 2011

Mohamed would return to Mexico in 2011, and on 19 September of that year, he was announced as the new manager of recently promoted Club Tijuana, replacing Joaquín Del Olmo. He led Tijuana to the Apertura 2012 championship, the first in the club's history, after defeating Toluca 4–1 on aggregate in the finals.

Mohamed stepped down as Tijuana manager in 2013, so he could move back to Argentina to be closer to his family.

=== Return to Huracán ===
Shortly after leaving Tijuana, Mohamed became the manager of Huracán for a second time on 2 July 2013. He resigned from the club in October, after three wins and seven losses in ten matches.

=== Club América ===
On 10 December 2013, Mohamed was named the new manager of Club América for the Clausura 2014 tournament after club president Ricardo Peláez confirmed it during an interview with Univisión. He was officially presented to the press on 17 December. At the press conference it was revealed that he had signed a one-year contract with the club, with the potential for an extension pending a review of his performance. Mohamed also spoke of the pressure that came with managing América and comparing it to his time with Club Tijuana, saying, "Here I have everything [sic] to lose." His first two signings where Paraguayan center-back Pablo Aguilar, whom he coached while at Tijuana, and Argentine striker Andrés Ríos.

Mohamed's first league match with América came on 4 January 2014 in a 3–0 victory over UANL at the Estadio Azteca. Mohamed suffered his first defeat as América manager on 10 January in a 0–1 loss to Tijuana. Following three consecutive victories against León, Atlas, and Atlante, América suffered defeats to Pachuca and Morelia, both 0–1, the first time they had lost back-to-back games since the Clausura 2012 tournament. The team was criticized for its defensive style of play, with many drawing comparisons to predecessor Miguel Herrera's more offensive-minded tactics and his successful reign at the club, though some believed that a lack of a proper pre-season and the club being in a period of transition were the reasons for the team's poor performances. On 23 February, América were defeated 1–3 by Pumas UNAM in the Mexico City derby, ending the club's two-year hegemony over their intracity rival.

On 27 April, following a 1–1 draw at Toluca, América secured their qualification for the playoffs. They would ultimately be eliminated in the quarterfinals by Santos Laguna with a 6–6 aggregate score (América won the first leg 5–3, but lost the second 1–3), with the away goals rule deciding the series. At the post-match press conference, Mohamed stated his hope for continuing on with the club, saying: "I am very content at the club, the board has given me their full support… if nothing strange happens then we [the coaching staff] will surely have a pre-season… I have a contract until December, they have always given me their full support, and it is up to them to decide."

The regular season Apertura 2014 was much more successful from the start, with Club America holding first place lead throughout the season. Turco continued to struggle winning any of the big three derbies during the regular season. Mohamed's laid-back style of managing caused friction with the administrative staff. These instances usually involved long weekend getaways to support Argentina at the 2014 FIFA World Cup Final and going to Europe for an all-star "peace match" for the Pope, among other circumstances.

Going into the liguilla, America's form had dropped significantly and many analyst did not see America making it past the first round. Tensions rose dramatically once America advanced to the semifinal after a nail-biter quarterfinal against Pumas. A few days before the first leg of America's semi-final match against Monterrey, Mohamed dismissed club co-captain Paul Aguilar after an undisclosed locker room incident. During that week, multiple sources said Mohamed would no longer continue at the club regardless of the playoff result. The club morale was further affected once players Luis Angel Mendoza and Jesus Molina were confirmed to be transferring teams before playoffs had ended.

On 6 December 2014, Mohamed announced his departure from the club after the end of the Apertura tournament. He still led the club to the Finals, and lifted the Apertura title after defeating UANL 3–1 on aggregate.

=== Monterrey ===
On 16 February 2015, after the release of Carlos Barra as coach, Monterrey appointed Mohamed as their new manager. He made his debut at the helm of the club five days later, in a 2–1 a victory against Querétaro.

Mohamed remained in charge of the Rayados in the following seasons, taking the club to the CONCACAF Champions League twice (2016 and 2018), but still being knocked out by Panamanian side Árabe Unido in the 2016–17 group stage. On 7 May 2018, he resigned.

=== Celta ===
On 22 May 2018, La Liga club Celta de Vigo appointed Mohamed as manager on a two-year contract. He was sacked on 12 November, with the team in 14th after 12 matches.

=== Fourth spell at Huracán ===
On 28 December 2018, Mohamed returned to Huracán, starting his fourth spell as manager of the club. He resigned the following 23 April, after the club was knocked out of the 2019 Copa Libertadores.

=== Return to Monterrey ===
On 9 October 2019, Mohamed returned to Mexico and Monterrey, after being named in charge until the end of the season. On 25 November of the following year, he left on a mutual agreement.

=== Atlético Mineiro ===
On 13 January 2022, Mohamed was appointed as manager of Atlético Mineiro of Brazil. On 20 February 2022, Mohamed won his first title with the club, by beating Flamengo in the penalty shootouts of the Supercopa do Brasil match. On 2 April 2022, Mohamed won his second trophy with Atlético, beating arch rivals Cruzeiro in the Campeonato Mineiro final with a 3–1 score. He left the club on 22 July 2022, following a string of poor results in the Campeonato Brasileiro and an exit in the round of 16 of the Copa do Brasil.

=== Pumas UNAM ===
In March 2023, Mohamed returned to Mexico, this time as manager of Pumas UNAM. He transformed the team into a consistent side in the Apertura 2023 tournament, but they were eliminated in the semifinals at the hands of Tigres UNAL due to them being the higher seeded team in the regular season after the tie ended 1-1 on aggregate with neither team scoring any away goals. On 12 December 2023, Mohamed stepped down from his position citing personal reasons.

=== Toluca ===
In December 2024, Mohamed was named head coach of Toluca ahead of the Clausura 2025. In May 2025, the team secured its eleventh league title, ending a 15-year gap without a championship. Later that year in December, Toluca won its twelfth league title, matching Guadalajara as the club with the second-most titles. In May 2026, Toluca defeated Tigres UANL to claim the CONCACAF Champions Cup. That September, the team added another trophy by overcoming Monterrey in the Leagues Cup final.

== Personal life ==
Mohamed's paternal grandfather was Lebanese-Syrian and his paternal grandmother was Argentine, and his maternal grandfather was Croatian and his maternal grandmother was Chilean. His nickname is El Turco ("The Turk"), following the custom in many Latin American countries of using that nickname for people of Arab descent.

In June 2006, his nine-year-old son Faryd was killed in a car accident during the World Cup in Germany. Mohamed suffered severe injuries in the accident and was in danger of losing his leg. On 29 December 2019, he fulfilled the promise he made to his son by making Monterrey champions of the Liga MX.

His other son Shayr is also a footballer and a forward. Both worked together at Monterrey in 2020.

== Managerial statistics ==
As of 21 November 2026

Managerial record by team and tenure
Team	From	To	Record								Ref
Team	From	To	G	W	D	L	GF	GA	GD	Win %	Ref
Zacatepec	July 2003	January 2004	30	14	8	8	56	38	+18	46.67	
Morelia	24 February 2004	30 June 2004	13	6	2	5	20	25	−5	46.15	
Querétaro	July 2004	February 2005	29	12	9	8	55	49	+6	41.38	
Chiapas	February 2005	April 2005	6	1	2	3	4	7	−3	16.67	
Huracán	April 2005	July 2006	46	18	10	18	65	56	+9	39.13	
Huracán	October 2006	September 2007	38	22	11	5	64	37	+27	57.89	
Veracruz	9 October 2007	27 January 2008	8	2	2	4	7	18	−11	25.00	
Colón	19 March 2008	21 September 2010	97	36	32	29	137	125	+12	37.11	
Independiente	4 October 2010	4 September 2011	47	14	18	15	60	56	+4	29.79	
Tijuana	19 September 2011	24 May 2013	84	36	32	16	109	82	+27	42.86	
Huracán	2 July 2013	1 October 2013	10	3	0	7	6	11	−5	30.00	
América	17 December 2013	14 December 2014	46	23	10	13	81	46	+35	50.00	
Monterrey	16 February 2015	7 May 2018	172	83	43	46	305	217	+88	48.26	
Celta	22 May 2018	12 November 2018	13	3	6	4	23	21	+2	23.08	
Huracán	28 December 2018	23 April 2019	18	2	6	10	11	25	−14	11.11	
Monterrey	9 October 2019	25 November 2020	53	23	18	12	88	65	+23	43.40	
Atlético Mineiro	13 January 2022	22 July 2022	45	27	13	5	77	36	+41	60.00	
Pumas UNAM	27 March 2023	12 December 2023	27	12	7	8	44	30	+14	44.44	
Toluca	12 December 2024	present	101	55	26	20	205	111	+94	54.46	
Career total			882	391	255	236	1,417	1,055	+362	44.33	—

== Honours ==
=== Player ===
Huracán

- Primera B Nacional: 1989–90

Boca Juniors

- Copa Master de Supercopa: 1992

Argentina

- Copa América: 1991

=== Manager ===
Independiente

- Copa Sudamericana: 2010

Tijuana

- Liga MX: Apertura 2012

América

- Liga MX: Apertura 2014

Monterrey

- Liga MX: Apertura 2019
- Copa MX: Apertura 2017, 2019–20

Atlético Mineiro

- Supercopa do Brasil: 2022
- Campeonato Mineiro: 2022

Toluca

- Liga MX: Clausura 2025, Apertura 2025
- Campeón de Campeones: 2025
- Campeones Cup: 2025
- CONCACAF Champions Cup: 2026
- Leagues Cup: 2026

=== Individual ===
- Premios Univision Deportes Best Liga MX Manager: 2014
- Liga MX Best Manager: 2015–16, 2025–26
- Liga MX Best XI Manager: Clausura 2025, Apertura 2025
- Liga MX Manager of the Month: April 2025, May 2025, September 2025, December 2025
- The Best of America Best Liga MX Manager: 2025
- Liga MX All-Star: 2026
- Number 11 retired by Toros Neza as a tribute to his run with the club (1993–98).
