= José Miguel =

Argentine footballer

Personal information
- Date of birth: June 23, 1969 (age 57)
- Place of birth: Temperley, Argentina
- Position: Goalkeeper

Senior career*
Years	Team	Apps	(Gls)
1986–1993	River Plate	39	(0)
1993–1994	Platense	31	(0)
1995–1999	Santos Laguna	117	(0)
2000–2002	Atlético Chipas		
2003–2004	Temperley		
- * Club domestic league appearances and goals

José Miguel (born June 23, 1969, in Temperley) is a retired Argentine football goalkeeper. He played professional football in Argentina and Mexico.

== Career ==
Miguel began his playing career in 1986 with River Plate where he made a total of 39 league appearances and won two league titles with the club. In 1993, he joined Club Atlético Platense where he served as the first team goalkeeper.

In 1995, he joined Mexican side Santos Laguna where he played until 1999. During his time with the club he won one league title in Inviero 1996 and made

In 2000, he joined Atlético Chipas where he played until 2002. Miguel returned to Argentina in 2003 to play for his home town club Temperley. He retired from football in 2004.

== Titles ==
- Primera División Argentina(2): 1989-90, Apertura 1991
- Primera División de Mexico (1): Inviero 1996
