= Humberto Romero (footballer) =

Mexican footballer and manager (born 1964)

Personal information
- Full name: Humberto Romero Martínez
- Date of birth: 11 October 1964 (age 62)
- Place of birth: Guadalajara, Mexico
- Height: 1.64 m (5 ft 5 in)
- Position: Defender

Senior career*
Years	Team	Apps	(Gls)
1982–1994	UdeG		
1994–1997	Toros Neza		

International career
1987	Mexico	1	(0)
- * Club domestic league appearances and goals

Humberto Romero Martínez (born 11 October 1964) is a Mexican football manager and former player who is the head coach of the Liga TDP club Camaroneros de Escuinapa.

== Playing career ==
Romero started his professional career with Leones Negros UdeG from his hometown Guadalajara in 1982. He would spend a total of 12 seasons playing for UdeG as a defender.

For the 1994–95 season, Romero was transferred to Toros Neza. He was part of the team that were runners-up to Guadalajara in the Verano 1997 tournament.

During his career, he was called once to the Mexico national team for a friendly match against El Salvador on 13 January 1987.

== Managerial career ==
Currently, Romero is the head coach of Camaroneros de Escuinapa, a club from the Liga TDP, from Escuinapa, Sinaloa.
