= José Luis González China =

Mexican footballer and manager (born 1966)

Personal information
- Full name: José Luis González China
- Date of birth: June 3, 1966 (age 60)
- Place of birth: Mexico City, Mexico
- Height: 5 ft 8 in (1.73 m)
- Position: Defender

Team information
- Current team: FC Sozca (manager)

Senior career*
Years	Team	Apps	(Gls)
1986–1988	Deportivo Neza	16	(2)
1988–1990	Atlante F.C.	73	(3)
1990–1991	Club León	32	(5)
1991–1997	Veracruz	176	(14)
1997–1998	Club León	30	(1)
1999	F.C. Atlas	15	(1)
1999–2000	Club León	30	(1)
2000–2005	Atlante F.C.	90	(0)
Total		462	(27)

International career
1980–1991	Mexico	14	(4)

Managerial career
- 2007: León (assistant)
- 2008–2009: Atlante (assistant)
- 2009: Mexico U-20
- 2009: Mexico U-17
- 2010: Chiapas Reserves and Academy
- 2011: Chiapas (assistant)
- 2012: Atlante (assistant)
- 2013–2014: Querétaro Reserves and Academy
- 2015–2016: Coras de Tepic
- 2017: Chiapas Reserves and Academy
- 2018: Atlante (assistant)
- 2018–2019: Tiburones Rojos de Veracruz Reserves and Academy
- 2019: Tiburones Rojos de Veracruz (interim)
- 2019: Tiburones Rojos de Veracruz (assistant)
- 2020–: FC Sozca
- * Club domestic league appearances and goals

José Luis González China (born 3 June 1966) is a Mexican football manager and former defender. He is currently the manager of Coras Tepic in the Ascenso MX. Previously he was the assistant of José Guadalupe Cruz, for Atlante F.C.

== Early career ==
González China made his Primera División debut on 8 February 1986 for Deportivo Neza with a 5–1 victory over Club León.

During his career he had many position changes. He started as a winger or attacking midfielder under managers Ricardo La Volpe and Rafael Puente, but finished his career as a sweeper.

=== International goals ===
Goal	Date	Venue	Opponent	Score	Result	Competition
1.	April 8, 1980	Toluca, Mexico	Honduras	5–0	Win	Friendly
2.	August 24, 1980	Sydney, Australia	Australia	2–2	Draw	Friendly
3.	August 30, 1980	Suva, Fiji	Fiji	0–2	Win	Friendly
4.	November 9, 1980	Mexico City, Mexico	United States	5–1	Win	1982 FIFA World Cup qualification

== U-17 Mexico National Team ==
In a press conference on 15 February 2009 the Mexican Football Federation presented Juan Carlos Chávez and José Luis Gonzalez China as the new managers for the Mexico national team youth squads, after the departure of Jesús Ramírez to Club América. They were given the task to qualify for the 2009 FIFA U-20 World Cup in Egypt. After the qualification rounds Chávez would manage the U-20 team, González China the U-17 and Raúl Gutiérrez the U-15 team.
