= Manuel Martínez (footballer, born 1972) =

Mexican footballer (born 1972)

Personal information
- Full name: Manuel Martínez Iñiguez
- Date of birth: 3 January 1972 (age 54)
- Place of birth: Guadalajara, Jalisco, Mexico
- Height: 1.68 m (5 ft 6 in)
- Position: Midfielder

Senior career*
Years	Team	Apps	(Gls)
1991–1999	C.D. Guadalajara	147	(6)
1999–2000	Club León	15	(5)
1999–2001	CD Toluca	32	(7)
2000–2001	Club Atlas	14	(0)
2001–2002	CF La Piedad	29	(1)
2002–2003	Querétaro FC	6	(0)

International career^{‡}
1995–2000	Mexico	4	(0)

Managerial career
- 2007–2017: Guadalajara Reserves and Academy
- 2018: Deportivo CAFESSA
- 2018–2019: Pioneros de Cancún
- * Club domestic league appearances and goals as of 8 June 2009 ‡ National team caps and goals as of 9 July 2007

Manuel Martínez Iñiguez (born 3 January 1972) is a Mexican former professional footballer who played as a midfielder. He obtained a total number of four caps for the Mexico national team between 1995 and 2000, and was a squad member at 1995 Copa América. He made his debut on 21 June 1995 during the US Cup against Colombia.

A left-sided midfielder, Martinez played eight years for Chivas, and was a starter on the team that won the Verano 1997 championship.
