= Martín Vilallonga =

Argentine footballer

Martin Vilallonga
Personal information
- Full name: Martin Raul Vilallonga
- Date of birth: 8 October 1970 (age 56)
- Place of birth: San Rafael, Argentina
- Height: 1.78 m (5 ft 10 in)
- Position: Striker

Senior career*
Years	Team	Apps	(Gls)
1990	Independiente	6	(0)
1991–1992	Estudiantes de La Plata	18	(0)
1993–1994	Independiente	36	(4)
1994	Lanús	32	(11)
1995–1996	Toros Neza	48	(13)
1996–1998	Racing Club	68	(12)
1998–2001	Lanús	74	(24)
2001	Avispa Fukuoka	7	(0)
2001–2002	Universitario de Deportes	36	(22)
2002–2003	Club León		
2003–2004	Arsenal de Sarandí	32	(4)
2004	Instituto	14	(4)
2006	Argentino de Mendoza		
- * Club domestic league appearances and goals as of 17 March 2008

Martin Raul Vilallonga (born 8 October 1970) is a former Argentine footballer.

He played the majority of his career in Argentina, where he played for the two Avellaneda rivals Independiente and Racing Club. He also played in Mexico for Toros Neza and Club León and in Peru for Universitario de Deportes.

Vilallonga also had a brief spell in Japan with Avispa Fukuoka.

== Club statistics ==
Club performance			League		Cup		League Cup		Total	
Season	Club	League	Apps	Goals	Apps	Goals	Apps	Goals	Apps	Goals
Japan			League		Emperor's Cup		J.League Cup		Total	
2001	Avispa Fukuoka	J1 League	7	0	0	0	2	2	9	2
Total			7	0	0	0	2	2	9	2

== Honours ==
- Argentine Clausura 1994
- Peruvian Apertura 2002
