= Pedro Pablo Osorio =

Mexican footballer and manager (born 1965)

Pedro Pablo Osorio Nicolás (born 29 December 1965 in Orizaba, Veracruz) is a Mexican football manager and former player who played as a defender. Osorio played eight matches for Mexico between 1988 and 1991.
