= Juan Ramón Jara =

Paraguayan footballer (born 1970)

Personal information
- Full name: Juan Ramón Jara Martínez
- Date of birth: 6 August 1970 (age 56)
- Place of birth: Asunción, Paraguay
- Height: 1.75 m (5 ft 9 in)
- Position: Left-back

Senior career*
Years	Team	Apps	(Gls)
1992–1993	Olimpia Asunción	?	(?)
1993–1995	Rosario Central	61	(2)
1995	Independiente	9	(0)
1996	Colón de Santa Fe	9	(0)
1996–1999	Rosario Central	41	(1)
2001–2002	Olimpia Asunción	?	(?)
2003	Emelec	12	(0)
2003–2004	Nueva Chicago	25	(0)
2004	Nacional Asunción	?	(?)
2005	3 de Febrero	?	(?)
2007	Portuguesa	?	(?)

International career
1992	Paraguay U23		
1993–1997	Paraguay	17	(0)
- * Club domestic league appearances and goals as of September 2008

Juan Ramón Jara Martínez (born 6 August 1970) is a retired football defender from Paraguay.

== Club career ==
Jara started his career with Olimpia in Paraguay before moving to Argentina to play for clubs such as Rosario Central, Independiente and Colón de Santa Fe. He spent his best years playing for Rosario Central, where he earned than 100 caps, and was part of the team that finished as runners-up in the 1998 Copa CONMEBOL. Jara then returned to Paraguay to play again for Olimpia and then had brief stints at Nueva Chicago (Argentina), Emelec (Ecuador), Nacional and 3 de Febrero (Paraguay) before finally playing for Portuguesa Fútbol Club of Venezuela in 2007.

== International career ==
Jara made his international debut in the Paraguay national football team on 10 June 1993 in a friendly match against Mexico (3-1 loss), substituting Carlos Gamarra in the 75th minute. He obtained a total number of 17 international caps, scoring no goals for the national side.

Jara was in the Paraguay national football team that competed at the 1992 Olympic games. Be also participated in a few matches for the 1998 FIFA World Cup qualifiers.

== Career statistics ==
=== International ===
Appearances and goals by national team and year
National team	Year	Apps	Goals
Paraguay	1993	2	0
Paraguay	1994	–	
Paraguay	1995	8	0
Paraguay	1996	2	0
Paraguay	1997	5	0
Total		17	0

== Honours ==
=== Club ===
- Olimpia
  - Torneo República: 1992
