= Federico Lussenhoff =

Argentine former professional footballer (born 1974)

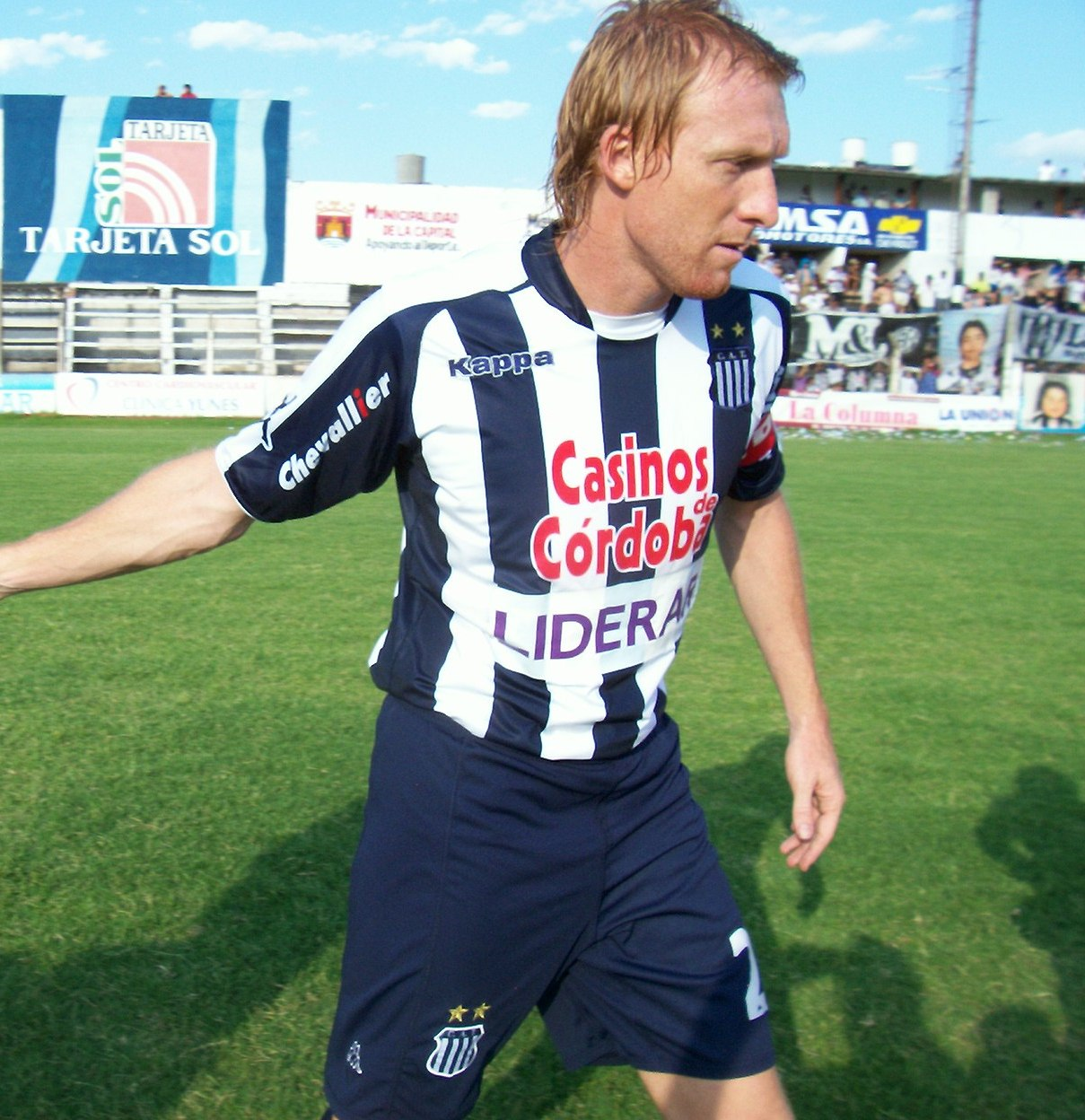
- Lussenhoff as a Talleres player (2009)

Personal information
- Full name: Federico Guillermo Lussenhoff
- Date of birth: 14 January 1974 (age 52)
- Place of birth: Venado Tuerto, Argentina
- Height: 1.85 m (6 ft 1 in)
- Position: Centre back

Senior career*
Years	Team	Apps	(Gls)
1992–1995	Rosario Central	97	(4)
1996–1997	Toros Neza	54	(5)
1997–1998	San Lorenzo	59	(2)
1999–2002	Tenerife	126	(6)
2002–2004	Mallorca	48	(0)
2004–2005	Cruz Azul	31	(3)
2005–2006	Colón	35	(3)
2006–2007	River Plate	29	(1)
2008–2009	Talleres	15	(0)
2010–2013	Sportivo Rivadavia		
Total		494	(24)
- * Club domestic league appearances and goals

Federico Guillermo Lussenhoff (born 14 January 1974) is an Argentine former professional footballer who played as a central defender.

In a career which lasted almost 20 years, he represented clubs in Mexico and Spain other than in his own country.

== Club career ==
Born in Venado Tuerto, Santa Fe Province, Lussenhoff began his career at Rosario Central, and also had spells at San Lorenzo de Almagro, Mexican clubs Toros Neza and Cruz Azul and CD Tenerife and RCD Mallorca in Spain.

In the latter nation, to where he arrived in January 1999, he was relegated from La Liga in his first season, then became an undisputed starter as the Canary Islands side returned to the top flight in 2001, under Rafael Benítez. With its Balearic Islands neighbours he managed to be relatively used during two years, helping them win the 2003 edition of the Copa del Rey.

In 2005, after 192 competitive matches in five and a half seasons in Spanish football, Lussenhoff returned to his country and signed with Club Atlético River Plate. He dropped down to the second division three years later, moving to Talleres de Córdoba.

Lussenhoff returned to Spain on 20 January 2010, as he joined his compatriot Nestor Gorosito – coach – at Xerez CD as director of football.

== Honours ==
Rosario Central

- Copa CONMEBOL: 1995

Mallorca

- Copa del Rey: 2002–03
