= Esteve Padilla =

Mexican footballer and manager (born 1975)

Personal information
- Full name: Esteve Gerardo Padilla Velasco
- Date of birth: 16 September 1975 (age 51)
- Place of birth: Guadalajara, Jalisco, Mexico
- Height: 1.81 m (5 ft 11 in)
- Position: Defender

Team information
- Current team: Comunicaciones (assistant)

Senior career*
Years	Team	Apps	(Gls)
1993–1997	Atlas		
1997–1990	Toros Neza		
1999	Club Zacatepec		
2000–2001	Toros Neza		
2001	Irapuato		
2002	Veracruz		
2002–2003	Club Zacatepec		
2003–2004	Jaguares de Tapachula		
2004–2006	Delfines de Coatzacoalcos		
2006–2008	Irapuato		

International career^{‡}
1995–1996	Mexico	4	(0)

Managerial career
- 2008: Libertadores de Pénjamo (assistant)
- 2010–2011: Cazcanes de Ameca
- 2012: Alianza de Sayula
- 2013: Tequila Pueblo Mágico
- 2016: Morelia Reserves and Academy
- 2017–2019: Morelia (assistant)
- 2019: Morelia Reserves and Academy
- 2019: Morelia (interim)
- 2020–2021: UAT (assistant)
- 2021–2022: Malacateco (assistant)
- 2022–2024: Sonora (assistant)
- 2024-2025: Malacateco (assistant)
- 2025–: Comunicaciones (assistant)
- * Club domestic league appearances and goals as of August 1, 2023 ‡ National team caps and goals as of August 1, 2023

Esteve Gerardo Padilla Velasco (born 16 September 1975) is a former Mexican professional footballer who played as a defender for Liga MX and he is currently the assistant manager of the Sonora.

== Club career ==
He started in the minor categories of Atlas F.C., making his debut in Liga MX in the 93–94 season with the rojinegros. In Winter '97 he moved to Toros Neza, where his participation has not enjoyed the continuity that he had in Atlas. He had a brief stint with the Ascenso MX Club Zacatepec where he remained for six months on loan, where he contributed with a goal in the 1999 Winter final although it was not enough to achieve promotion. After his acceptable time with the Cañeros he returned to Mexico's highest category with the Toros where he is regular in some matches to suffer relegation with the club and he spent some seasons with them in the promotion division and then signed with the Club Irapuato for winter 2001. However, due to the change of headquarters of the strawberry team, he continued his career in the franchise that moved to Veracruz with the nickname of Tiburones Rojos de Veracruz, being his last club in the first division to culminate his career in the second highest category, including his returns in the clubs of Zacatepec and Irapuato also played for Jaguares de Tapachula and Delfines de Coatzacoalcos of the same division.

== International career ==
He has been international with the Mexico national football team between 1995 and 1996 and played 4 international matches.

== Managerial career ==
In 2017 he started as an assistant for Morelia. In 2020, Padilla was named assistant coach of UAT. In 2021, Padilla was part of the coaching staff that won the championship with Malacateco. In 2022, he was appointed as assistant of Sonora.
