= Rodrigo Ruiz =

Chilean-Mexican footballer (born 1972)

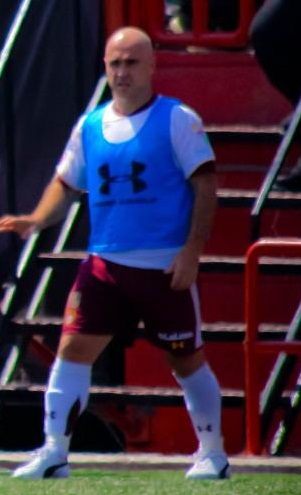

Personal information
- Full name: Rodrigo Patricio Ruiz de Barbieri
- Date of birth: May 10, 1972 (age 54)
- Height: 1.63 m (5 ft 4 in)
- Position: Midfielder

Senior career*
Years	Team	Apps	(Gls)
1992–1994	Unión Española		
1993	→ Regional Atacama (loan)		
1994–1996	Puebla	65	(10)
1996–1999	Toros Neza	132	(32)
1999–2006	Santos Laguna	269	(59)
2005	→ Pachuca (loan)	0	(0)
2007–2010	Tecos	100	(14)
2008	→ Veracruz (loan)	17	(2)
2010–2011	Santos Laguna	25	(0)
2011–2013	Tecos	59	(2)
Total		667	(119)

International career
1993–2001	Chile	7	(1)

Managerial career
- 2015–2019: Tecos
- 2020: Lobos Zacatepec
- 2020–2022: Irritilas
- 2022–2024: Los Cabos United
- * Club domestic league appearances and goals

Rodrigo Patricio Ruiz de Barbieri (born 10 May 1972) is a former Chilean professional footballer.

== Club career ==
He played for Unión Española, Regional Atacama, Toros Neza, Santos Laguna, Pachuca, Veracruz, and last played for Estudiantes Tecos of the Ascenso MX.

== International career ==
During the qualifiers to the 1998 FIFA World Cup, Ruiz played a match with the Chile national team against Uruguay at Centenario Stadium, that Chile lost 1–0. In total, he made 7 appearances for Chile and scored one goal.

== Coaching career ==
He began his career with Tecos in 2015. After working in Lobos Zacatepec and Irritilas FC, he joined Los Cabos United in 2022.

== Personal life ==
He was nicknamed Pony by his former fellow footballer in Unión Española, Mario Lucca, due to his strength and height.

He naturalized Mexican by residence.

One of the 33 miners rescued from the 2010 mining accident in Copiapó, Chile, Mario Gómez, is related to him since Gómez is the cousin of his mother-in-law.

== Honours ==
Santos Laguna

- Mexican Primera División: Verano 2001
- InterLiga: 2004
