= Germán Arangio =

Argentine footballer

Personal information
- Full name: Carlos Germán Arangio
- Date of birth: 23 May 1976 (age 50)
- Place of birth: Buenos Aires, Argentina
- Height: 1.77 m (5 ft 10 in)
- Position: Striker

Senior career*
| Years | Team | Apps | (Gls) |
| 1995–1996 | Racing Club | 20 | (5) |
| 1996–2000 | Toros Neza | 159 | (63) |
| 2000–2001 | Atlante | 30 | (11) |
| 2002–2003 | Zacatepec | 39 | (13) |
| 2003–2005 | Emirates Club | 39 | (21) |
| 2005 | Huracán | 3 | (0) |
| 2005 | Grêmio | 1 | (0) |
| 2006 | Audax Italiano | 14 | (2) |
| 2006 | Palestino | 8 | (1) |
| 2007 | América de Cali | 2 | (0) |
| 2007 | Alumni | 6 | (0) |
| 2008 | Resende | 1 | (0) |
| 2009 | Albinegros de Orizaba | 4 | (1) |
| Total | | 326 | (117) |

International career
| 1995 | Argentina U20 | 8 | (3) |

Managerial career
- 2012: Tijuana (Liga TDP)
- 2013: Club Tijuana Reserves
- 2013–2014: Dorados de Sinaloa (assistant)
- 2015: Coras Premier
- 2015: Chiapas Reserves
- 2016: Caimanes Cancún
- 2020: Toros Neza
- * Club domestic league appearances and goals

Carlos Germán Arangio (born 23 May 1976) is a retired professional football player from Argentina who played as a striker.

== Professional career ==
Playing for Racing Club de Avellaneda, Arangio made his First Division debut in 1994. He represented Argentina as part of the U-20 team that won the 1995 FIFA World Youth Championship. He then transferred to Mexico where he played for Toros Neza in the Primera División from 1996 to 2000.

On 1 April 1997, Arangio was involved in an infamous incident during an international friendly between Toros Neza and the Jamaica national team. After he responded to a bad tackle by punching his opponent, a five-minute brawl ensued and the match was called off.

For the 2000–2001 season he was transferred to Atlante, before returning to Toros Neza for 2001–2002, and then Club Zacatepec in 2002–2003. Arangio then relocated to the United Arab Emirates where he played for the Emirates Club from 2003 to 2005, before returning to Argentina to play 12 matches for Club Atlético Huracán in 2005 and 2006. He then transferred to Chile to play for Audax Italiano and then Club Deportivo Palestino.

On 15 February 2007, it was confirmed that he was signed to América de Cali in Colombia. He then returned to Argentina to play for Alumni de Villa María of the 3rd division interior.

In 2009, he returned to Mexico to play with Albinegros de Orizaba.
