= Toros Neza =

Neza FC
- Full name: Neza Fútbol Club
- Nicknames: Los Toros (The Bulls); Los Astados (The Horned)
- Founded: 20 May 1991; 35 years ago (as Toros UTN)
- Ground: Estadio Municipal Claudio Suárez; Texcoco, State of Mexico
- Capacity: 4,000
- Owner: Hugo Vázquez
- Chairman: José Antonio Ruíz
- Manager: Ignacio Negrete
- League: Liga Premier (Serie A)
- 2025–26: Regular phase: 12th (Group III); Final phase: Did not qualify
- Website: http://www.torosneza.mx/
Home colours	Away colours

Neza Fútbol Club, simplified as Neza FC, is a Mexican football club based in Nezahualcóyotl, State of Mexico. It competes in Liga Premier, the third level division of Mexican football, and plays its home matches at the Estadio Municipal Claudio Suárez. Founded in 1991 as Toros UTN, then the club was moved to Pachuca, Hidalgo and played the 1993–94 season as Toros Hidalgo, the following year the club returned to its original hometown, and changed its name to Toros Neza. After the club's dissolution in 2002, the club returned under its current name in 2011.

The club returned for the Clausura 2011 tournament in the Liga de Ascenso de México, taking the place of Atlante UTN who had been purchased by Grupo Salinas. An earlier Toros Neza side played in the Primera División de México in the 1990s.

== History ==
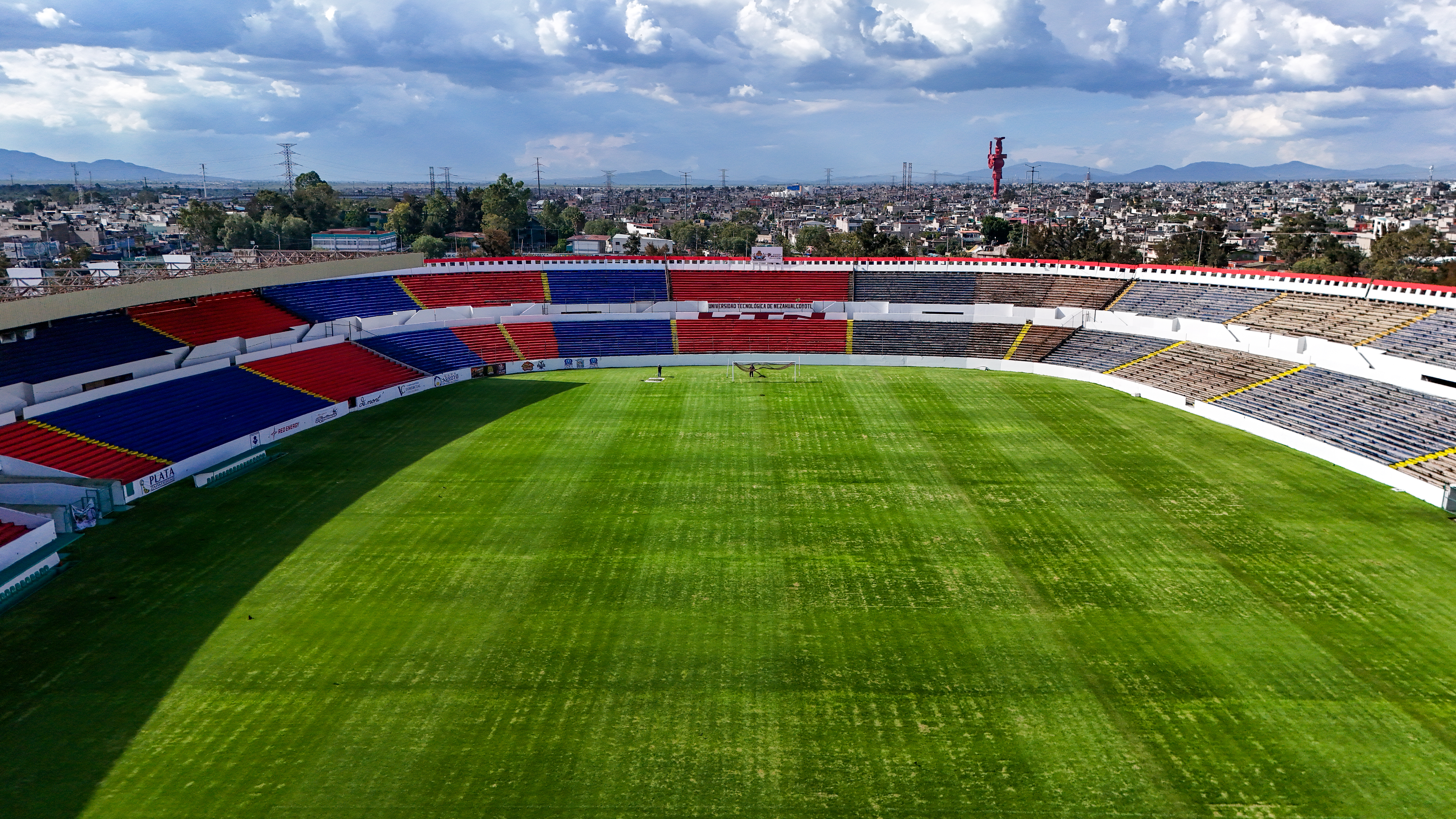
Estadio Neza 86, home of Toros Neza.

Toros Neza was promoted after winning the championship of the Segunda División de México in the 1992–93 season (under the name "Toros de la Universidad Tecnológica de Neza") to the Primera División de México in the 1993–94 season as Toros Neza, taking the place of Pachuca who had been relegated from the Primera División to the Primera División 'A' de México. There have been several clubs that played in the city of Neza, such as Deportivo Neza, which only had a short stay in the Primera División in the 1970s when after 4 years the club was sold.

After the 1993–94 season, they finished bottom of their group, and played their last 14 home games in Pachuca, Hidalgo, changing their name to Toros Hidalgo. However, the following season they returned to Ciudad Nezahualcóyotl and they were known again as Toros Neza.

In the 1996–97 tournament, they reached the semi-finals in the Apertura 1997. They bettered this in the Clausura, reaching the final where they lost to C.D. Guadalajara. However, they were relegated at the end of the 1999–2000 season.

=== Return of Neza ===
In December 2010, it was announced that Neza would be returning to the professional ranks for the Clausura stage of the 2010–11 Liga de Ascenso season. They later became the filial team of Monarcas Morelia, and were ultimately owned by TV Azteca and Grupo Salinas.

They effectively took the place of the Atlante UTN team who competed in the Apertura 2010 tournament. The Monarcas Morelia and Atlante clubs swapped their filial teams, and the changed team were known as Neza FC starting with the Clausura 2011 tournament.

When the new calendar for the 2015-16 Segunda División season came out, once again the team had dissolved.

=== 2nd Return of Neza ===
A team called Neza FC has come to compete in the Liga de Balompié Méxicano for the league's first season, 2020–21, as a continuation of Toros Neza. The team competed in that league until 2024, achieving three league runner-up finishes during that period. However, in 2025 this league was suspended due to financial problems, leaving Neza without a professional competition in which to play.

In June 2025, Neza's board of directors reached a merger agreement with Atlético Aragón, a team previously playing in the Liga Premier – Serie A, the third tier of the league system recognized by the Mexican Football Federation. With the agreement, Neza took Aragón's place in that league, continuing its professional participation as a new affiliate team of the Femexfut.

The team competed only during the 2025–26 season; in the summer of 2026, its owners took over the operations of Tepatitlán F.C. (of the Liga de Expansión MX), resulting in the transfer of part of Neza's squad and coaching staff to Tepatitlán and causing the Neza team to go on hiatus for the 2026–27 season, since the team did not achieve the expected success in the State of Mexico.

== Players ==
=== First-team squad ===
As of 25 August 2025

Note: Flags indicate national team as defined under FIFA eligibility rules; some limited exceptions apply. Players may hold more than one non-FIFA nationality.

No.	Pos.	Nation	Player
1	GK	MEX	Arturo Gatica
2	DF	MEX	Neri Martínez
3	DF	MEX	Iván Ríos
4	DF	MEX	Pablo Guzmán
5	MF	MEX	Pablo Ramírez
6	MF	MEX	Duilio Pacheco
7	MF	MEX	Morrison Palma
9	MF	MEX	Alan Flores
9	FW	COL	Diego Mosquera
10	MF	MEX	Hugo Vázquez
11	FW	MEX	Diego Uriarte
12	MF	MEX	Alan Viurquez
13	GK	MEX	Diego Rodríguez
14	MF	MEX	Alejandro Martínez
15	DF	MEX	Kevin Terrones
16	DF	MEX	Rodrigo Balderas

No.	Pos.	Nation	Player
18	MF	MEX	David Bautista
19	MF	MEX	Darién Velázquez
20	DF	MEX	Alan Santos
21	FW	MEX	Sergio García
22	MF	MEX	Raúl Sampayo
23	MF	MEX	Esteban Alcántar
24	DF	MEX	Hassan Aguilar
25	GK	MEX	Enrique Castro
26	MF	MEX	Mario Nájera
27	MF	MEX	Ernesto López
28	MF	MEX	José Carlos García
29	MF	MEX	Alex Martínez
30	FW	MEX	Bryan Rodríguez
31	FW	COL	Carlos Moreno
44	DF	COL	Andrés Pérez

=== Notable former players ===
- (Argentina) German Arangio
- (Argentina) Daniel Garnero
- (Argentina) Federico Lussenhoff
- (Argentina) Antonio Mohamed
- (Argentina) Martín Vilallonga
- (Brazil) Bebeto
- (Brazil) Nildeson
- (Chile) Rodrigo Ruiz
- (Colombia) Luis Carlos Perea
- (Mexico) Efraín Munguia
- (Mexico) Pedro Pineda
- (Mexico) Jesús López Meneses
- (Mexico) Félix Cruz
- (Mexico) Miguel Herrera
- (Mexico) Pablo Larios
- (Mexico) Oscar Mascorro
- (Mexico) Manuel Negrete
- (Mexico) Juan de Dios Ramírez
- (Mexico) Camilo Romero
- (Mexico) Humberto Romero
- (Mexico) Javier Saavedra
- (Mexico) Guillermo Vázquez
- (Mexico) Óscar Dautt
- (Switzerland) Jörg Stiel

== Player Records ==
=== Top scorers ===
Number	Player	Seasons	Total	League	Cup
1	(Argentina) Germán Arangio	1996-2000	53	53	-
2	(Argentina) Antonio Mohamed	1993-1998	52	51	1
3	(Chile) Rodrigo Ruiz	1996-1999	36	32	4
4	(Mexico) Guillermo Vázquez	1994-1998	27	23	4
5	(Brazil) Nidelson	1995-1997	20	20	-
6	(Argentina) Martín Vilallonga	1995-1996	20	13	7
7	(Mexico) Pedro Pineda	1995-1996	14	14	-
8	(Mexico) Jesús López Meneses	1994-2000	12	12	-
9	(Mexico) Carlos Briseño	1993-95/1996-97	11	11	-

== Competition record ==
=== Ascenso MX record ===
Ascenso MX
Season	Tournament	Place
Clausura 2011	Liga de Ascenso	Semifinals
Apertura 2011	Liga de Ascenso	Semifinals
Clausura 2012	Liga de Ascenso	Quarterfinals
Apertura 2012	Ascenso MX	Champions

=== Copa MX record ===
Copa MX
Season	Tournament	Place
Copa MX Apertura 2012	Copa MX	Semifinals

== Honours ==
Type	Competition	Titles	Winning years	Runners-up
Top division	Primera División	0	–	Verano 1997
Top division	Copa México	0	–	1996–97
Promotion divisions	Primera División A/Ascenso MX	1	Clausura 2013	Verano 2001
Promotion divisions	Campeón de Ascenso	0	–	2013
Promotion divisions	Segunda División	1	1992–93	–

=== Friendly ===
- Torneo Cuadrangular Toluca: 1980
- Parmalat Cup: 1997

== Kit evolution and rare kits ==
1994 Local

1994

1997 Local

1997

1997-98 Local

1997-98

1998 Local

1998

1999 Local

1999

2011 Local

2011
