= 1997–98 Mexican Primera División season =

56th professional season of the top-flight football league in Mexico

Primera División de México
- Season: 1997–98
- Champions: Invierno 1997: Cruz Azul (8th title); Verano 1998: Toluca (4th title)
- Relegated: Veracruz
- Champions' Cup: Cruz Azul; Toluca; León
- Copa Libertadores: Guadalajara; América
- Matches: 338
- Goals: 958 (2.83 per match)
- Top goalscorer: Invierno 1997: Luis García (12 goals); Verano 1998: José Cardozo (13 goals)

The 1997–98 Primera División de México (Mexican First Division) was the 56th professional season of Mexico's top-flight football league. The season began on Friday, July 25, 1997, and ended on April 6, 1998. The tournament was broken down into two seasons: Invierno 1997, which Cruz Azul won, and Verano 1998, which Deportivo Toluca won. UANL was promoted to the Mexico Primera División as Pachuca was relegated to the Primera División A.

== Overview ==
=== Teams ===
Location of the 1997-98 Primera División teams

Team	City	Stadium
América	Mexico City	Azteca
Atlante	Mexico City	Azteca
Atlas	Guadalajara, Jalisco	Jalisco
Atlético Morelia	Morelia, Michoacán	Morelos
Celaya	Celaya, Guanajuato	Miguel Alemán Valdés
Cruz Azul	Mexico City	Azul
Guadalajara	Guadalajara, Jalisco	Jalisco
León	León, Guanajuato	León
Monterrey	Monterrey, Nuevo León	Tecnológico
Necaxa	Mexico City	Azteca
Puebla	Puebla, Puebla	Cuauhtémoc
Santos Laguna	Torreón, Coahuila	Corona
Toluca	Toluca, State of Mexico	Nemesio Díez
Toros Neza	Nezahualcóyotl, State of Mexico	Neza 86
UAG	Zapopan, Jalisco	Tres de Marzo
UANL	San Nicolás de los Garza, Nuevo León	Universitario
UNAM	Mexico City	Olímpico Universitario
Veracruz	Veracruz, Veracruz	Luis "Pirata" Fuente

== Torneo Invierno ==
"Invierno 1997" began on Friday, July 25, 1997, and ran until October 26 not including the playoffs. In the final Cruz Azul defeated León and became champions for the 8th time.

=== Final standings (groups) ===
==== Group 1 ====
Pos	Team	Pld	W	D	L	GF	GA	GD	Pts	Qualification
1	León	17	9	5	3	30	22	+8	32	Qualified directly to the Liguilla (Playoffs)
2	Atlante	17	8	6	3	26	17	+9	30	Qualified directly to the Liguilla (Playoffs)
3	Veracruz	17	5	6	6	19	25	−6	21	
4	Celaya	17	5	5	7	21	26	−5	20	
5	Puebla	17	5	4	8	20	27	−7	19	

Source: MedioTiempo

==== Group 2 ====
Pos	Team	Pld	W	D	L	GF	GA	GD	Pts	Qualification
1	Cruz Azul	17	8	7	2	29	16	+13	31	Qualified directly to the Liguilla (Playoffs)
2	Guadalajara	17	8	5	4	28	24	+4	29	Qualified directly to the Liguilla (Playoffs)
3	Monterrey	17	6	4	7	22	22	0	22	
4	Toluca	17	5	4	8	21	21	0	19	
5	UANL	17	5	3	9	20	26	−6	18	

Source: MedioTiempo

==== Group 3 ====
Pos	Team	Pld	W	D	L	GF	GA	GD	Pts	Qualification
1	Atlético Morelia	17	7	7	3	25	19	+6	28	Qualified directly to the Liguilla (Playoffs)
2	Toros Neza	17	6	5	6	29	29	0	23	Qualified directly to the Liguilla (Playoffs)
3	UNAM	17	3	7	7	26	30	−4	16	
4	Santos Laguna	17	3	7	7	22	31	−9	16	

Source: MedioTiempo

==== Group 4 ====
Pos	Team	Pld	W	D	L	GF	GA	GD	Pts	Qualification
1	América	17	8	5	4	27	19	+8	29	Qualified directly to the Liguilla (Playoffs)
2	Atlas	17	6	5	6	28	26	+2	23	Qualified directly to the Liguilla (Playoffs)
3	Necaxa	17	4	6	7	26	31	−5	18	
4	UAG	17	3	7	7	19	27	−8	16	

Source: MedioTiempo

=== League table ===
Pos	Team	Pld	W	D	L	GF	GA	GD	Pts	Qualification or relegation
1	León	17	9	5	3	30	22	+8	32	Advance to Liguilla (Playoffs)
2	Cruz Azul (C)	17	8	7	2	29	16	+13	31	Advance to Liguilla (Playoffs)
3	Atlante	17	8	6	3	26	17	+9	30	Advance to Liguilla (Playoffs)
4	América	17	8	5	4	27	19	+8	29	Advance to Liguilla (Playoffs)
5	Guadalajara	17	8	5	4	28	24	+4	29	Advance to Liguilla (Playoffs)
6	Atlético Morelia	17	7	7	3	25	19	+6	28	Advance to Liguilla (Playoffs)
7	Atlas	17	6	5	6	28	26	+2	23	Advance to Liguilla (Playoffs)
8	Toros Neza	17	6	5	6	29	29	0	23	Advance to Liguilla (Playoffs)
9	Monterrey	17	6	4	7	22	22	0	22	
10	Veracruz	17	5	6	6	19	25	−6	21	
11	Celaya	17	5	5	7	21	26	−5	20	
12	Toluca	17	5	4	8	21	21	0	19	
13	Puebla	17	5	4	8	20	27	−7	19	
14	Necaxa	17	4	6	7	26	31	−5	18	
15	UANL	17	5	3	9	20	26	−6	18	
16	UNAM	17	3	7	7	26	30	−4	16	
17	UAG	17	3	7	7	19	27	−8	16	
18	Santos Laguna	17	3	7	7	22	31	−9	16	

Source: MedioTiempo
Rules for classification: 1) Points; 2) Goal difference; 3) Number of goals scored; 4) Head-to-head results between tied teams; 5) Number of goals scored away; 6) Highest relegation coefficient; 7) Fair Play points
(C) Champions

=== Results ===
Home \ Away	AME	ATE	ATS	ATM	CEL	CAZ	GDL	LEO	MTY	NEC	PUE	SAN	TOL	TRN	UAG	UNL	UNM	VER
América	—	–	0–2	1–1	–	–	–	2–3	1–0	–	4–0	2–1	4–2	1–1	–	3–1	–	–
Atlante	2–1	—	2–0	1–1	–	–	–	3–1	1–0	–	2–2	–	–	2–1	–	2–0	–	–
Atlas	–	–	—	4–2	–	–	–	2–3	2–1	–	2–1	1–1	1–1	3–1	1–1	2–0	–	–
Atlético Morelia	–	–	–	—	3–2	–	–	1–1	2–1	–	1–0	6–3	1–0	3–0	0–0	0–0	–	–
Celaya	1–1	0–1	2–1	–	—	0–3	1–2	–	–	1–3	–	–	1–0	–	–	–	2–2	1–0
Cruz Azul	0–1	1–1	3–1	0–1	–	—	–	2–2	3–1	–	0–0	–	–	2–2	–	–	–	–
Guadalajara	1–2	3–2	2–1	1–1	–	1–1	—	–	2–2	–	–	–	–	3–1	–	–	–	1–1
León	–	–	–	–	1–2	–	3–2	—	–	3–2	–	2–2	–	–	2–0	1–0	2–0	3–1
Monterrey	–	–	–	–	1–1	–	–	0–0	—	3–1	2–1	2–1	1–0	1–1	0–1	2–3	–	–
Necaxa	2–2	2–2	3–3	2–0	–	1–3	0–1	–	–	—	–	–	1–1	–	–	–	2–2	1–1
Puebla	–	–	–	–	2–1	–	3–2	1–0	–	0–1	—	1–1	–	–	1–1	2–1	3–2	–
Santos Laguna	–	0–2	–	–	0–0	1–1	3–1	–	–	1–0	–	—	–	–	1–2	–	4–3	1–1
Toluca	–	1–1	–	–	–	2–3	0–0	1–2	–	–	1–0	4–0	—	–	–	1–3	–	4–0
Toros Neza	–	–	–	–	2–1	–	–	1–1	–	4–2	3–1	2–2	2–0	—	4–1	3–2	1–3	–
UAG	0–0	1–0	–	–	3–4	0–2	2–3	–	–	2–3	–	–	1–2	–	—	–	2–2	1–1
UANL	–	–	–	–	1–1	0–1	1–2	–	–	2–0	–	1–0	–	–	1–1	—	2–4	2–1
UNAM	1–2	1–0	1–1	1–1	–	2–2	0–1	–	1–3	–	–	–	0–1	–	–	–	—	1–1
Veracruz	1–0	2–2	2–1	2–1	–	0–2	–	–	1–2	–	3–2	–	–	1–0	–	–	–	—

Updated to match(es) played on 26 October 1997. Source: RSSSF
Legend: Blue = home team win; Yellow = draw; Red = away team win.

=== Top goalscorers ===
Players sorted first by goals scored, then by last name. Only regular season goals listed.

Rank	Player	Club	Goals
1	(Mexico) Luis García	Atlante	12
2	(Mexico) Carlos Hermosillo	Cruz Azul	10
2	(Mexico) Jesús Olalde	UNAM	10
4	(Argentina) Germán Arangio	Toros Neza	9
4	(Mexico) Daniel Guzmán	Atlas	9
6	(Mexico) Gustavo Nápoles	Guadalajara	8
7	(Mexico) Jared Borgetti	Santos Laguna	7
7	(Paraguay) José Cardozo	Toluca	7
7	(Brazil) Claudinho	Atlético Morelia	7
7	(Argentina) Juan Ramón Fleita	Toros Neza	7
7	(Argentina) Antonio Mohamed	Toros Neza	7
7	(Mexico) Sigifredo Mercado	León	7
7	(Chile) Claudio Núñez	UANL	7
7	(Honduras) Carlos Pavón	Necaxa	7
7	(Mexico) Ricardo Peláez	América	7

Source: Liga MX

=== Playoffs ===
==== Bracket ====
Quarterfinals
1	Léon	0	6	6
8	Toros Neza	1	3	4
4	América	3	1	4
5	Guadalajara	1	0	1
2	Cruz Azul	1	4	5
7	Atlas	0	1	1
3	Atlante	1	0	1
6	Atlético Morelia	0	0	0

Semifinals
1	Léon	0	3	3
4	América	1	1	2
2	Cruz Azul	1	1	2
3	Atlante	1	0	1

Finals
1	Léon	0	1	1
2	Cruz Azul (asdet)	1	1	2

==== Quarterfinals ====
November 20, 1997
15:00

Toros Neza	1–0	León
Ruiz 24'	Report

Estadio Neza 86, Ciudad Nezahualcóyotl
Referee: Eduardo Brizio Carter (Mexico City)
November 23, 1997
12:00

León	6–3	Toros Neza
Espinoza 3', 76'; Prátola 40'; Turrubiates 47'; Peña 55'; Davino 84'	Report	Vázquez 26' (pen.); Ruiz 43'; Mohamed 90'

Estadio León, León
Referee: Armando Archundia (Estado de México)

León won 6–4 on aggregate.

November 18, 1997
20:45

Guadalajara	1–3	América
Suárez 15'	Report	Peláez 40', 57'; García Aspe 82' (pen.)

Estadio Jalisco, Guadalajara
Referee: León Padró Borja (Guanajuato)
November 21, 1997
17:00

América	1–0	Guadalajara
Terrazas 74'	Report

Estadio Azteca, Mexico City
Referee: Arturo Brizio Carter (Mexico City)

América won 4–1 on aggregate.

November 19, 1997
20:45

Atlas	0–1	Cruz Azul
	Report	Hermosillo 62'

Estadio Jalisco, Guadalajara
Referee: Antonio Marrufo (Chihuahua)
November 22, 1997
17:00

Cruz Azul	4–1	Atlas
Yegros 17'; Hermosillo 21', 80'; López 75' (o.g.)	Report	Pardo 22'

Estadio Azul, Mexico City
Referee: Gilberto Alcalá Pineda (Mexico City)

Cruz Azul won 5–1 on aggregate.

November 19, 1997
15:00

Atlético Morelia	0–0	Atlante
	Report

Estadio Morelos, Morelia
Referee: Pascual Rebolledo (Veracruz)
November 22, 1997
12:00

Atlante	1–0	Atlético Morelia
García 49'	Report

Estadio Azteca, Mexico City
Referee: Felipe Ramos Rizo (Mexico City)

Atlante won 1–0 on aggregate.

==== Semifinals ====
November 26, 1997
12:00

Atlante	1–1	Cruz Azul
Ubaldi 53'	Report	Galindo 59' (pen.)

Estadio Azteca, Mexico City
Referee: León Padró Borja (Guanajuato)
November 29, 1997
17:00

Cruz Azul	1–0	Atlante
Yegros 63'	Report

Estadio Azul, Mexico City
Referee: Armando Archundia (Estado de México)

Cruz Azul won 2–1 on aggregate.

November 27, 1997
17:00

América	1–0	León
Peláez 53'	Report

Estadio Azteca, Mexico City
Referee: Gilberto Alcalá Pineda (Mexico City)
November 30, 1997
12:00

León	3–1	América
Espinoza 13'; Begines 19', 22'	Report	Zárate 3'

Estadio León, León
Referee: Arturo Brizio Carter (Mexico City)

León won 3–2 on aggregate.

==== Finals ====
First leg

December 4, 1997
17:00

Cruz Azul	1–0	León
Galindo 53' (pen.)	Report

Estadio Azul, Mexico City
Referee: Armando Archundia (Estado de México)

Cruz Azul:
GK	1	(Mexico) Óscar Pérez
DF	2	(Mexico) Guadalupe Castañeda		(substituted off) 78'
DF	3	(Mexico) José Luis Sixtos
DF	4	(Peru) Juan Reynoso (c)
DF	19	(Mexico) Omar Rodríguez
MF	13	(Mexico) Carlos Barra
MF	16	(Mexico) Joaquín Moreno	(yellow card) 31'	(substituted off) 55'
MF	7	(Mexico) Benjamín Galindo
MF	10	(Argentina) Héctor Adomaitis
FW	11	(Paraguay) Julio César Yegros	(yellow card) 84'
FW	15	(Mexico) Francisco Palencia
Substitutions:
FW	27	(Mexico) Carlos Hermosillo		(substituted on) 55'
FW	9	(Mexico) Jorge Campos		(substituted on) 78'
Manager:
(Mexico) Luis Fernando Tena

León:
GK	1	(Argentina) Ángel Comizzo
DF	19	(Mexico) Sigifredo Mercado	(yellow card) 66'
DF	3	(Argentina) Edgardo Prátola	(yellow card) 43' (yellow-red card) 45'
DF	58	(Mexico) Carlos Turrubiates (c)	(yellow card) 74'
DF	2	(Mexico) Ricardo Cadena
MF	5	(Mexico) Flavio Davino
MF	6	(Mexico) Roberto Medina
MF	11	(Mexico) Alberto García	(red card) 42'
MF	14	(Mexico) José Antonio Reinoso	(yellow card) 47'	(substituted off) 55'
MF	15	(Mexico) Missael Espinoza		(substituted off) 46'
FW	17	(Costa Rica) Hernán Medford		(substituted off) 66'
Substitutions:
FW	27	(Mexico) Carlos López		(substituted on) 46'
MF	8	(Mexico) Martín Peña		(substituted on) 55'
DF	31	(Mexico) David Alba	(yellow card) 47'	(substituted on) 66'
Manager:
(Chile) Carlos Reinoso

Second leg

December 7, 1997
12:00

León	1–1 (a.e.t.)	Cruz Azul
Espinoza 53'	Report	Hermosillo 101' (pen.)

Estadio León, León
Referee: Arturo Brizio Carter (Mexico City)

Cruz Azul won 2–1 on aggregate.

León:
GK	1	(Argentina) Ángel Comizzo
DF	19	(Mexico) Sigifredo Mercado
DF	58	(Mexico) Carlos Turrubiates (c)
DF	2	(Mexico) Ricardo Cadena	(yellow card) 35'
MF	5	(Mexico) Flavio Davino	(yellow card) 15' (yellow-red card) 72'
MF	6	(Mexico) Roberto Medina	(yellow card) 33'
MF	8	(Mexico) Martín Peña		(substituted off) 29'
MF	14	(Mexico) José Antonio Reinoso	(yellow card) 30'	(substituted off) 46'
MF	15	(Mexico) Missael Espinoza
FW	18	(Mexico) Everaldo Begines
FW	17	(Costa Rica) Hernán Medford	(yellow card) 32'
Substitutions:
MF	13	(Mexico) Omar Santacruz		(substituted on) 29' (substituted off) 59'
FW	7	(Federal Republic of Yugoslavia) Dejan Batrović		(substituted on) 46'
DF	27	(Mexico) Carlos López		(substituted on) 59'
Manager:
(Chile) Carlos Reinoso

Cruz Azul:
GK	1	(Mexico) Óscar Pérez
DF	2	(Mexico) Guadalupe Castañeda	(yellow card) 44' (yellow-red card) 71'
DF	3	(Mexico) José Luis Sixtos
DF	4	(Peru) Juan Reynoso (c)
DF	19	(Mexico) Omar Rodríguez	(yellow card) 20'	(substituted off) 90'
MF	13	(Mexico) Carlos Barra
MF	16	(Mexico) Joaquín Moreno
MF	7	(Mexico) Benjamín Galindo		(substituted off) 52'
MF	10	(Argentina) Héctor Adomaitis
FW	11	(Paraguay) Julio César Yegros		(substituted off) 76'
FW	15	(Mexico) Francisco Palencia
Substitutions:
MF	22	(Mexico) José Agustín Morales		(substituted on) 52'
MF	17	(Mexico) Eduardo Fuentes		(substituted on) 76'
FW	27	(Mexico) Carlos Hermosillo		(substituted on) 90'
Manager:
(Mexico) Luis Fernando Tena

Invierno 1997 winners

8th title

== Torneo Verano ==
"Verano 1998" began on Saturday, January 3, 1998, and ran until April 6. In the final Toluca defeated Necaxa and became champions for the fourth time on May 10.

=== Final standings (groups) ===
==== Group 1 ====
Pos	Team	Pld	W	D	L	GF	GA	GD	Pts	Qualification
1	Atlante	17	5	8	4	19	18	+1	23	Qualified directly to the Liguilla (Playoffs)
2	Puebla	17	4	6	7	23	30	−7	18	Qualified for the Repechage
3	León	17	4	5	8	20	32	−12	17	
4	Celaya	17	3	6	8	13	23	−10	15	
5	Veracruz	17	3	5	9	20	29	−9	14	

Source: MedioTiempo

==== Group 2 ====
Pos	Team	Pld	W	D	L	GF	GA	GD	Pts	Qualification
1	Toluca	17	10	3	4	39	25	+14	33	Qualified directly to the Liguilla (Playoffs)
2	Cruz Azul	17	8	6	3	32	18	+14	30	Qualified directly to the Liguilla (Playoffs)
3	UANL	17	7	2	8	15	22	−7	23	
4	Guadalajara	17	5	4	8	19	17	+2	19	
5	Monterrey	17	4	6	7	20	25	−5	18	

Source: MedioTiempo

==== Group 3 ====
Pos	Team	Pld	W	D	L	GF	GA	GD	Pts	Qualification
1	Santos Laguna	17	8	2	7	24	22	+2	26	Qualified directly to the Liguilla (Playoffs)
2	Toros Neza	17	7	3	7	21	24	−3	24	Qualified for the Repechage
3	Atlético Morelia	17	5	6	6	26	30	−4	21	
4	UNAM	17	6	3	8	23	28	−5	21	

Source: MedioTiempo

==== Group 4 ====
Pos	Team	Pld	W	D	L	GF	GA	GD	Pts	Qualification
1	Necaxa	17	10	2	5	34	18	+16	32	Qualified directly to the Liguilla (Playoffs)
2	Atlas	17	9	3	5	29	23	+6	30	Qualified directly to the Liguilla (Playoffs)
3	UAG	17	9	3	5	23	21	+2	30	Qualified for the Repechage
4	América	17	7	5	5	27	22	+5	26	Qualified for the Repechage

Source: MedioTiempo

=== League table ===
Pos	Team	Pld	W	D	L	GF	GA	GD	Pts	Qualification or relegation
1	Toluca (C)	17	10	3	4	39	25	+14	33	Advance to Liguilla (Playoffs)
2	Necaxa	17	10	2	5	34	18	+16	32	Advance to Liguilla (Playoffs)
3	Cruz Azul	17	8	6	3	32	18	+14	30	Advance to Liguilla (Playoffs)
4	Atlas	17	9	3	5	29	23	+6	30	Advance to Liguilla (Playoffs)
5	UAG	17	9	3	5	23	21	+2	30	Advance to Repechage
6	América	17	7	5	5	27	22	+5	26	Advance to Repechage
7	Santos Laguna	17	8	2	7	24	22	+2	26	Advance to Liguilla (Playoffs)
8	Toros Neza	17	7	3	7	21	24	−3	24	Advance to Repechage
9	Atlante	17	5	8	4	19	18	+1	23	Advance to Liguilla (Playoffs)
10	UANL	17	7	2	8	15	22	−7	23	
11	Atlético Morelia	17	5	6	6	26	30	−4	21	
12	UNAM	17	6	3	8	23	28	−5	21	
13	Guadalajara	17	5	4	8	19	17	+2	19	
14	Monterrey	17	4	6	7	20	25	−5	18	
15	Puebla	17	4	6	7	23	30	−7	18	Advance to Repechage
16	León	17	4	5	8	20	32	−12	17	
17	Celaya	17	3	6	8	13	23	−10	15	
18	Veracruz	17	3	5	9	20	29	−9	14	Team is last in Relegation table

Source: MedioTiempo
Rules for classification: 1) Points; 2) Goal difference; 3) Number of goals scored; 4) Head-to-head results between tied teams; 5) Number of goals scored away; 6) Highest relegation coefficient; 7) Fair Play points
(C) Champions

=== Results ===
Home \ Away	AME	ATE	ATS	ATM	CEL	CAZ	GDL	LEO	MTY	NEC	PUE	SAN	TOL	TRN	UAG	UNL	UNM	VER
América	—	1–1	–	–	1–0	1–1	0–0	–	–	2–0	–	–	–	–	0–1	–	1–3	5–2
Atlante	–	—	–	–	0–0	0–2	1–0	–	–	0–3	–	1–0	2–2	–	2–0	–	2–3	1–0
Atlas	1–1	1–0	—	–	2–0	1–2	3–2	–	–	1–2	–	–	–	–	–	–	4–1	2–0
Atlético Morelia	1–2	2–2	4–3	—	–	2–1	1–0	–	–	2–1	–	–	–	–	–	–	0–0	1–1
Celaya	–	–	–	0–2	—	–	–	4–1	0–0	–	0–0	1–0	–	1–1	1–2	1–0	–	–
Cruz Azul	–	–	–	–	5–0	—	2–2	–	–	1–1	–	1–0	3–1	–	5–2	2–0	2–2	1–2
Guadalajara	–	–	–	–	0–0	–	—	1–1	–	1–2	2–0	0–2	2–0	–	1–2	0–1	4–0	–
León	2–1	2–2	2–0	3–3	–	1–1	–	—	2–1	–	0–0	–	1–5	1–2	–	–	–	–
Monterrey	3–2	1–1	0–0	1–1	–	1–2	2–1	–	—	–	–	–	–	–	–	–	3–1	2–2
Necaxa	–	–	–	–	2–1	–	–	2–0	4–0	—	5–2	3–0	–	1–2	1–2	4–0	–	–
Puebla	1–3	1–1	1–2	5–3	–	1–1	–	–	1–1	–	—	–	3–1	2–4	–	–	–	1–0
Santos	1–1	–	2–3	2–2	–	–	–	3–0	2–1	–	3–0	—	1–3	2–0	–	2–0	–	–
Toluca	1–3	–	4–1	2–0	3–3	–	–	–	2–1	2–0	–	–	—	4–1	2–1	–	2–1	–
Toros Neza	1–2	0–0	1–1	2–1	–	1–0	0–1	–	2–3	–	–	–	–	—	–	–	–	2–0
UAG	–	–	1–2	3–1	–	–	–	1–0	1–0	–	3–2	1–2	–	1–0	—	0–0	–	–
UANL	3–1	0–3	0–2	2–0	–	–	–	2–1	1–0	–	1–1	–	0–3	3–0	–	—	–	–
UNAM	–	–	–	–	3–1	–	–	3–1	–	0–1	0–2	0–1	–	1–2	1–1	2–0	—	–
Veracruz	–	–	–	–	1–0	–	0–2	1–2	–	2–2	–	5–1	2–2	–	1–1	0–2	1–2	—

Updated to match(es) played on 6 April 1998. Source: RSSSF
Legend: Blue = home team win; Yellow = draw; Red = away team win.

=== Top goalscorers ===
Players sorted first by goals scored, then by last name. Only regular season goals listed.

Rank	Player	Club	Goals
1	(Paraguay) José Cardozo	Toluca	13
2	(Brazil) Claudinho	Atlético Morelia	11
2	(Mexico) Carlos Hermosillo	Cruz Azul	11
4	(Mexico) Luis Hernández	Necaxa	9
5	(Argentina) Hugo Norberto Castillo	Atlas	8
5	(Mexico) Jesús Olalde	UNAM	8
7	(Argentina) Germán Arangio	Toros Neza	7
7	(Mexico) Cuauhtémoc Blanco	Necaxa	7
7	(Mexico) Ricardo Peláez	América	7
7	(Argentina) Martín Félix Ubaldi	Atlante	7

Source: MedioTiempo

=== Playoffs ===
==== Repechage ====
April 8, 1998
12:00

Puebla	2–1	UAG
Muñoz 50'; Sol 66'	Report	da Silva 29' (pen.)

Estadio Cuauhtémoc, Puebla
Referee: León Padró Borja (Guanajuato)
April 11, 1998
20:30

UAG	4–1	Puebla
Rizo 4'; Rosales 27'; da Silva 56'; Muf 70'	Report	Rivera 87'

Estadio Tres de Marzo, Zapopan
Referee: Gilberto Alcalá Pineda (Mexico City)

UAG won 5–3 on aggregate.

April 10, 1998
16:00

Toros Neza	1–2	América
Ruiz 1'	Report	Torres 10'; Cedrés 28'

Estadio Neza 86, Ciudad Nezahualcóyotl
Referee: Felipe Ramos Rizo (Mexico City)
April 13, 1997
20:45

América	4–2	Toros Neza
Torres 27'; Zague 47'; Cedrés 77'; Pantoja 87'	Report	Fleita 17', 65'

Estadio Azteca, Mexico City
Referee: Armando Archundia (Estado de México)

América won 6–3 on aggregate.

==== Bracket ====
Quarterfinals
1	Toluca	1	5	6
9	Atlante	0	1	1
3	Cruz Azul	1	1	2
6	América	2	1	3
2	Necaxa	0	2	2
7	Santos Laguna	0	1	1
4	Atlas	1	4	5
5	UAG	2	2	4

Semifinals
1	Toluca	1	2	3
6	América	0	1	1
2	Necaxa (s)	2	1	2
4	Atlas	1	1	2

Finals
1	Toluca	1	5	6
2	Necaxa	2	2	4

==== Quarterfinals ====
April 15, 1998
20:45

Atlante	0–1	Toluca
	Report	Cardozo 28'

Estadio Azteca, Mexico City
Referee: Edgar Ulises Rangel (Estado de México)
April 18, 1998
15:00

Toluca	5–1	Atlante
Vukić 35'; Abundis 40'; Cardozo 81', 85'; Ruiz 90+1'	Report	Moreno 77' (pen.)

Estadio Nemesio Díez, Toluca
Referee: Felipe Ramos Rizo (Mexico City)

Toluca won 6–1 on aggregate.

April 16, 1998
20:45

América	2–1	Cruz Azul
Lara 17'; Zárate 62'	Report	Galindo 89'

Estadio Azteca, Mexico City
Referee: Gilberto Alcalá Pineda (Mexico City)
April 19, 1998
18:00

Cruz Azul	1–1	América
Yegros 48'	Report	Zague 52'

Estadio Azul, Mexico City
Referee: Armando Archundia (Estado de México)

América won 3–2 on aggregate.

April 15, 1998
17:00

Santos Laguna	0–0	Necaxa
	Report

Estadio Corona, Torreón
Referee: Eduardo Brizio Carter (Mexico City)
April 18, 1998
18:00

Necaxa	2–1	Santos Laguna
Pineda 73'; Aguinaga 89'	Report	Borgetti 82'

Estadio Azteca, Mexico City
Referee: León Padró Borja (Guanajuato)

Necaxa won 2–1 on aggregate.

April 15, 1998
20:30

UAG	2–1	Atlas
da Silva 65', 90'	Report	Obledo 17'

Estadio Tres de Marzo, Zapopan
Referee: Pascual Rebolledo (Veracruz)
April 18, 1998
20:45

Atlas	4–2	UAG
Zepeda 24', 66'; Guzmán 42'; Obledo 54'	Report	Parks 63'; Garcés 68'

Estadio Jalisco, Guadalajara
Referee: Arturo Brizio Carter (Mexico City)

Atlas won 5–4 on aggregate.

==== Semifinals ====
April 26, 1998
18:00

América	0–1	Toluca
	Report	Alfaro 52'

Estadio Azteca, Mexico City
Referee: Arturo Brizio Carter (Mexico City)
May 3, 1998
12:00

Toluca	2–1	América
Abundis 14'; Estay 65'	Report	Cedrés 83'

Estadio Nemesio Díez, Toluca
Referee: Gilberto Alcalá Pineda (Mexico City)

Toluca won 3–1 on aggregate.

April 25, 1998
20:45

Atlas	1–2	Necaxa
Castillo 46'	Report	Pineda 24'; Aguinaga 43'

Estadio Jalisco, Guadalajara
Referee: Armando Archundia (Estado de México)
May 2, 1998
18:00

Necaxa	1–1	Atlas
Pineda 48'	Report	Castillo 57'

Estadio Azteca, Mexico City
Referee: Felipe Ramos Rizo (Mexico City)

Necaxa won 3–2 on aggregate.

==== Finals ====
First leg

May 7, 1998
18:00

Necaxa	2–1	Toluca
Pineda 56', 87'	Report	Ruiz 76'

Estadio Azteca, Mexico City
Referee: Gilberto Alcalá Pineda (Mexico City)

Necaxa:
GK	25	(Mexico) Adolfo Ríos
DF	2	(Mexico) Salvador Cabrera
DF	3	(Mexico) Sergio Almaguer
DF	4	(Brazil) Ricardo Wagner De Souza		(substituted off) 75'
DF	5	(Mexico) José Luis Montes de Oca	(yellow card) 25'
DF	15	(Mexico) Octavio Becerril
DF	19	(Chile) Eduardo Vilches
MF	6	(Mexico) Joaquín del Olmo	(yellow card) 69'
MF	7	(Ecuador) Álex Aguinaga (c)	(yellow card) 48'
MF	21	(Uruguay) Sergio Vázquez		(substituted off) 86'
FW	31	(Mexico) Pedro Pineda
Substitutions:
GK	1	(Mexico) Raúl Orvañanos Jr.
DF	18	(Mexico) José Milián
DF	20	(Mexico) José Higareda
MF	6	(Mexico) José Manuel de la Torre
FW	9	(Honduras) Carlos Pavón		(substituted on) 75'
FW	11	(Mexico) José Luis Mendoza
FW	13	(Mexico) Edson Alvarado		(substituted on) 86'
Manager:
(Mexico) Raúl Arias

Toluca:
GK	30	(Mexico) Mario Alberto Albarrán
DF	13	(Mexico) Alberto Macías	(yellow card) 12'
DF	58	(Mexico) Adán Nuñez
DF	18	(Mexico) David Rangel (c)
DF	5	(Mexico) Omar Blanco
MF	6	(Mexico) Antonio Taboada
MF	7	(Mexico) Víctor Ruiz
MF	10	(Chile) Fabián Estay
MF	27	(Mexico) Enrique Alfaro		(substituted off) 86'
FW	9	(Paraguay) José Cardozo	(yellow card) 54'
FW	23	(Mexico) José Manuel Abundis
Substitutions:
GK	1	(Argentina) Martín Herrera
DF	2	(Mexico) Eugenio Villazón
DF	3	(Chile) Manuel López
DF	21	(Mexico) Robert Forbes		(substituted on) 86'
MF	14	(Croatia) Darko Vukić
FW	11	(Mexico) Édgar García de Dios
FW	15	(Mexico) Eduardo Lillingston
Manager:
(Mexico) Enrique Meza

Second leg

May 10, 1998
12:00

Toluca	5–2	Necaxa
Taboada 3'; Abundis 35', 52'; Cardozo 58', 89'	Report	Montes de Oca 1'; Aguinaga 2'

Estadio Toluca 70-86, Toluca
Referee: Arturo Brizio Carter (Mexico City)

Toluca won 6–4 on aggregate.

Toluca:
GK	30	(Mexico) Mario Alberto Albarrán
DF	13	(Mexico) Alberto Macías
DF	58	(Mexico) Adán Nuñez		(substituted off) 33'
DF	18	(Mexico) David Rangel (c)
DF	5	(Mexico) Omar Blanco
MF	6	(Mexico) Antonio Taboada
MF	7	(Mexico) Víctor Ruiz	(yellow card) 6'
MF	10	(Chile) Fabián Estay
MF	27	(Mexico) Enrique Alfaro		(substituted off) 68'
FW	9	(Paraguay) José Cardozo	(yellow card) 32'
FW	23	(Mexico) José Manuel Abundis		(substituted off) 78'
Substitutions:
GK	1	(Argentina) Martín Herrera
DF	2	(Mexico) Eugenio Villazón		(substituted on) 78'
DF	3	(Chile) Manuel López		(substituted on) 68'
DF	21	(Mexico) Robert Forbes
MF	14	(Croatia) Darko Vukić		(substituted on) 33'
FW	11	(Mexico) Édgar García de Dios
FW	15	(Mexico) Eduardo Lillingston
Manager:
(Mexico) Enrique Meza

Necaxa:
GK	25	(Mexico) Adolfo Ríos
DF	2	(Mexico) Salvador Cabrera
DF	3	(Mexico) Sergio Almaguer	(yellow card) 60'
DF	4	(Brazil) Ricardo Wagner De Souza		(substituted off) 60'
DF	5	(Mexico) José Luis Montes de Oca	(red card) 20'
DF	15	(Mexico) Octavio Becerril
DF	19	(Chile) Eduardo Vilches	(yellow card) 44'	(substituted off) 78'
MF	6	(Mexico) Joaquín del Olmo
MF	7	(Ecuador) Álex Aguinaga (c)	(yellow card) 65'
MF	21	(Uruguay) Sergio Vázquez		(substituted off) 82'
FW	31	(Mexico) Pedro Pineda
Substitutions:
GK	16	(Mexico) José Guadarrama
DF	18	(Mexico) José Milián
DF	20	(Mexico) José Higareda
MF	6	(Mexico) José Manuel de la Torre		(substituted on) 78'
FW	9	(Honduras) Carlos Pavón		(substituted on) 60'
FW	11	(Mexico) José Luis Mendoza
FW	13	(Mexico) Edson Alvarado		(substituted on) 82'
Manager:
(Mexico) Raúl Arias

Verano 1998 winners

4th title

== Relegation table ==
Pos.	Team	Pts.	Pld.	Ave.
14	UANL	41	34	1.2058
15	Atlético Morelia	122	102	1.1961
16	Celaya	116	102	1.1372
17	Puebla	116	102	1.1372
18	Veracruz	113	102	1.1078
