= Primera División de México Verano 1999 =

Primera División
- Season: 1998–99
- Champions: Toluca (5th title)
- Relegated: Puebla
- Champions' Cup: Toluca
- Top goalscorer: José Cardozo (15 goals)

Primera División de México (Mexican First Division) Verano 1999 is a Mexican football tournament - one of two short tournaments that take up the entire year to determine the champion(s) of Mexican football. It began on Friday, January 15, 1999, and ran until May 9, when the regular season ended. In the final Toluca defeated Atlas and became champions for the fifth time.

== Clubs ==
Location of the Primera División Verano 1999 teams

Team	City	Stadium
América	Mexico City	Azteca
Atlante	Mexico City	Azteca
Atlas	Guadalajara, Jalisco	Jalisco
Atlético Morelia	Morelia, Michoacán	Morelos
Celaya	Celaya, Guanajuato	Miguel Alemán Valdés
Cruz Azul	Mexico City	Azul
Guadalajara	Guadalajara, Jalisco	Jalisco
León	León, Guanajuato	León
Monterrey	Monterrey, Nuevo León	Tecnológico
Necaxa	Mexico City	Azteca
Pachuca	Pachuca, Hidalgo	Hidalgo
Puebla	Puebla, Puebla	Cuauhtémoc
Santos Laguna	Torreón, Coahuila	Corona
Toluca	Toluca, State of Mexico	Nemesio Díez
Toros Neza	Nezahualcóyotl, State of Mexico	Neza 86
UAG	Zapopan, Jalisco	Tres de Marzo
UANL	San Nicolás de los Garza, Nuevo León	Universitario
UNAM	Mexico City	Olímpico Universitario

== Regular phase ==
Group 1
Pos	Team	Pld	W	D	L	GF	GA	GD	Pts	Qualification
1	Cruz Azul	17	9	4	4	30	24	+6	31	Directly qualified to the Liguilla (Playoffs)
2	Guadalajara	17	7	5	5	24	21	+3	26	Directly qualified to the Liguilla (Playoffs)
3	Celaya	17	6	6	5	29	26	+3	24	
4	León	17	5	1	11	19	33	−14	16	
5	Puebla	17	3	4	10	15	30	−15	13	

Source: MedioTiempo

Group 2
Pos	Team	Pld	W	D	L	GF	GA	GD	Pts	Qualification
1	América	17	9	4	4	30	25	+5	31	Directly qualified to the Liguilla (Playoffs)
2	Atlético Morelia	17	8	1	8	23	23	0	25	Directly qualified to the Liguilla (Playoffs)
3	Pachuca	17	6	6	5	23	22	+1	24	
4	UNAM	17	6	3	8	19	27	−8	21	
5	Toros Neza	17	4	5	8	21	29	−8	17	

Source: MedioTiempo

Group 3
Pos	Team	Pld	W	D	L	GF	GA	GD	Pts	Qualification
1	Necaxa	17	5	7	5	30	25	+5	22	Directly qualified to the Liguilla (Playoffs)
2	UAG	17	6	1	10	21	28	−7	19	Qualified for the Repechage
3	Atlante	17	4	6	7	31	34	−3	18	
4	Monterrey	17	4	2	11	25	38	−13	14	

Source: MedioTiempo

Group 4
Pos	Team	Pld	W	D	L	GF	GA	GD	Pts	Qualification
1	Toluca	17	12	3	2	50	23	+27	39	Directly qualified to the Liguilla (Playoffs)
2	Atlas	17	10	4	3	34	22	+12	34	Directly qualified to the Liguilla (Playoffs)
3	Santos Laguna	17	9	2	6	33	29	+4	29	Qualified for the Repechage
4	UANL	17	7	2	8	34	32	+2	23	

Source: MedioTiempo

== League table ==
Pos	Team	Pld	W	D	L	GF	GA	GD	Pts	Qualification
1	Toluca	17	12	3	2	50	23	+27	39	Directly qualified to the Liguilla (Playoffs)
2	Atlas	17	10	4	3	34	22	+12	34	Directly qualified to the Liguilla (Playoffs)
3	Cruz Azul	17	9	4	4	30	24	+6	31	Directly qualified to the Liguilla (Playoffs)
4	América	17	9	4	4	30	25	+5	31	Directly qualified to the Liguilla (Playoffs)
5	Santos Laguna	17	9	2	6	33	29	+4	29	Qualified for the Repechage
6	Guadalajara	17	7	5	5	24	21	+3	26	Directly qualified to the Liguilla (Playoffs)
7	Atlético Morelia	17	8	1	8	23	23	0	25	Directly qualified to the Liguilla (Playoffs)
8	Celaya	17	6	6	5	29	26	+3	24	
9	Pachuca	17	6	6	5	23	22	+1	24	
10	UANL	17	7	2	8	34	32	+2	23	
11	Necaxa	17	5	7	5	30	25	+5	22	Directly qualified to the Liguilla (Playoffs)
12	UNAM	17	6	3	8	19	27	−8	21	
13	UAG	17	6	1	10	21	28	−7	19	Qualified for the Repechage
14	Atlante	17	4	6	7	31	34	−3	18	
15	Toros Neza	17	4	5	8	21	29	−8	17	
16	León	17	5	1	11	19	33	−14	16	
17	Monterrey	17	4	2	11	25	38	−13	14	
18	Puebla	17	3	4	10	15	30	−15	13	

Source: MedioTiempo

== Top goalscorers ==
Players sorted first by goals scored, then by last name. Only regular season goals listed.

Rank	Player	Club	Goals
1	(Paraguay) José Cardozo	Toluca	15
2	(Mexico) Cuauhtémoc Blanco	América	14
2	(Mexico) José Manuel Abundis	Toluca	14
4	(Honduras) Carlos Pavón	Necaxa	13
4	(Mexico) Pedro Pineda	Necaxa	13
6	(Mexico) Luis Hernández	UANL	12
7	(Mexico) Francisco Palencia	Cruz Azul	11
8	(Mexico) Everaldo Begines	León	9
8	(Mexico) Jared Borgetti	Santos Laguna	9
8	(Mexico) Carlos Hermosillo	Necaxa	9

Source: MedioTiempo

== Results ==
Home \ Away	AME	ATE	ATS	ATM	CEL	CAZ	GDL	LEO	MTY	NEC	PAC	PUE	SAN	TOL	TRN	UAG	UNL	UNM
América	—	–	–	2–1	2–2	–	0–1	–	4–1	1–1	–	1–1	3–1	–	–	1–0	–	3–1
Atlante	1–1	—	–	–	1–4	–	–	–	3–1	–	0–0	1–1	–	2–3	–	1–2	2–1	–
Atlas	3–2	0–0	—	–	–	–	–	4–0	3–2	–	3–0	3–0	–	3–3	–	–	1–0	–
Atlético Morelia	–	3–2	1–2	—	–	0–2	–	1–0	–	–	0–2	–	–	0–0	3–0	–	2–3	1–2
Celaya	–	–	1–2	3–1	—	0–0	0–0	–	–	1–1	–	–	3–0	–	1–2	2–1	–	–
Cruz Azul	4–0	3–2	2–1	–	–	—	–	3–2	3–2	–	2–1	–	–	3–2	–	–	3–2	–
Guadalajara	–	2–5	1–1	1–2	–	2–0	—	3–0	–	–	0–0	–	–	–	1–1	–	3–1	2–1
León	0–2	3–2	–	–	2–3	–	–	—	0–1	–	0–1	3–1	–	3–2	–	–	2–1	–
Monterrey	–	–	–	1–2	1–2	–	2–4	–	—	4–1	–	1–1	2–5	–	1–0	3–0	–	–
Necaxa	–	2–2	2–3	0–1	–	1–1	3–0	4–0	–	—	–	–	–	–	1–1	–	1–1	5–1
Pachuca	1–2	–	–	–	2–2	–	–	–	2–2	1–1	—	2–0	1–0	0–3	–	3–0	–	1–1
Puebla	–	–	–	0–1	3–1	2–2	1–2	–	–	0–2	–	—	1–2	–	1–0	1–0	–	–
Santos Laguna	–	4–2	2–1	1–0	–	3–1	2–2	3–2	–	3–1	–	–	—	–	1–0	–	–	1–2
Toluca	3–0	–	–	–	5–2	–	1–0	–	4–0	3–1	–	3–0	3–2	—	–	3–2	–	2–0
Toros Neza	1–2	3–3	5–2	–	–	1–1	–	0–0	–	–	2–3	–	–	1–6	—	–	2–1	–
UAG	–	–	1–2	2–4	–	2–0	1–0	2–1	–	2–3	–	–	1–1	–	2–1	—	–	–
UANL	3–4	–	–	–	1–0	–	–	–	2–0	–	4–3	3–0	4–2	4–4	–	2–1	—	1–2
UNAM	–	1–2	0–0	–	2–2	1–0	–	0–1	2–1	–	–	3–2	–	–	0–1	0–2	–	—

Updated to match(es) played on 9 May 1999. Source: RSSSF
Legend: Blue = home team win; Yellow = draw; Red = away team win.

== Final phase (Liguilla) ==
=== Repechage ===
May 13, 1999
20:30

UAG	1–4	Santos Laguna
Palacios 90'	Report	Boasso 28'; Ovelar 33', 42'; Borgetti 77'

Estadio Tres de Marzo, Zapopan
Referee: Armando Archundia (Estado de México)
May 16, 1999
16:00

Santos Laguna	3–4	UAG
Borgetti 28'; Rodríguez 58'; Noriega 66'	Report	Palacios 10'; Rizo 18'; Hernández 25' da Silva 89'

Estadio Corona, Torreón
Referee: Gilberto Alcalá Pineda (Mexico City)

Santos won 7–5 on aggregate.

=== Bracket ===
Quarterfinals
1	Toluca	3	1	4
11	Necaxa	1	2	3
4	América	0	2	2
5	Santos Laguna	3	0	3
2	Atlas (s)	1	2	3
7	Atlético Morelia	1	2	3
3	Cruz Azul	2	2	4
6	Guadalajara	1	2	3

Semifinals
1	Toluca	1	3	4
5	Santos Laguna	1	2	3
2	Atlas	4	2	6
3	Cruz Azul	0	0	0

Finals
1	Toluca (p)	3	2	5 (5)
2	Atlas	3	2	5 (4)

=== Quarterfinals ===
May 19, 1999
18:30

Necaxa	1–3	Toluca
Vázquez 25'	Report	García 43'; Macías 56'; Cardozo 63'

Estadio Azteca, Mexico City
Referee: Edgar Ulises Rangel (Estado de México)
May 22, 1999
15:00

Toluca	1–2	Necaxa
Cardozo 68'	Report	Delgado 22'; Aguinaga 61'

Estadio Nemesio Díez, Toluca
Referee: Felipe Ramos Rizo (Mexico City)

Toluca won 4–3 on aggregate.

May 20, 1999
16:00

Santos Laguna	3–0	América
Machón 10'; Borgetti 28'; Lillingston 78'	Report

Estadio Corona, Torreón
Referee: León Padró Borja (Guanajuato)
May 23, 1999
17:00

América	2–0	Santos Laguna
Espínola 22'; Blanco 60'	Report

Estadio Azteca, Mexico City
Referee: Gilberto Alcalá Pineda (Mexico City)

Santos won 3–2 on aggregate.

May 19, 1999
17:00

Atlético Morelia	1–1	Atlas
Franco 32'	Report	Osorno 21'

Estadio Morelos, Morelia
Referee: Antonio Marrufo (Chihuahua)
May 22, 1999
20:45

Atlas	2–2	Atlético Morelia
Bustos 57'; Castillo 88'	Report	Mora 36'; Osorno 64' (o.g.)

Estadio Jalisco, Guadalajara
Referee: Edgar Ulises Rangel (Estado de México)

3–3 on aggregate. Atlas advanced for being the higher seeded team.

May 19, 1999
20:45

Guadalajara	1–2	Cruz Azul
Arellano 84'	Report	Reynoso 3'; Palencia 86'

Estadio Jalisco, Guadalajara
Referee: Eduardo Brizio Carter (Mexico City)
May 22, 1999
17:00

Cruz Azul	2–2	Guadalajara
Adomaitis 10'; Reynoso 64'	Report	García 12', 23'

Estadio Azul, Mexico City
Referee: Armando Archundia (Estado de México)

Cruz Azul won 4–3 on aggregate.

=== Semifinals ===
May 26, 1999
16:00

Santos Laguna	1–1	Toluca
Noriega 42'	Report	Cardozo 28'

Estadio Corona, Torreón
Referee: Eduardo Brizio Carter (Mexico City)
May 29, 1999
15:00

Toluca	3–2	Santos Laguna
Macías 7'; Abundis 25'; Alfaro 74'	Report	Ovelar 2'; Borgetti 15' (pen.)

Estadio Nemesio Díez, Toluca
Referee: Armando Archundia (Estado de México)

Toluca won 4–3 on aggregate.

May 26, 1999
18:00

Cruz Azul	0–4	Atlas
	Report	Andrade 29'; Zepeda 39'; Rodríguez 48' (pen.); Castillo 50'

Estadio Azul, Mexico City
Referee: Felipe Ramos Rizo (Mexico City)
May 29, 1999
20:45

Atlas	2–0	Cruz Azul
Rodríguez 25'; Castillo 60'	Report

Estadio Jalisco, Guadalajara
Referee: Gilberto Alcalá Pineda (Mexico City)

Atlas won 6–0 on aggregate.

=== Finals ===
June 3, 1999
20:45

Atlas	3–3	Toluca
Andrade 21'; Castillo 53'; Márquez 69'	Report	Morales 3', 27'; Cardozo 8'

Estadio Jalisco, Guadalajara
Referee: Eduardo Brizio Carter (Mexico City)

First leg

Atlas:
GK	99	(Mexico) Erubey Cabuto
DF	22	(Mexico) Julio Estrada
DF	3	(Mexico) Héctor López (c)
DF	27	(Mexico) Rafael Márquez	(yellow card) 66'
DF	5	(Argentina) Pablo Lavallén	(yellow card) 7'	(substituted off) 20'
MF	18	(Mexico) Miguel Zepeda
MF	8	(Argentina) Jorge Almirón		(substituted off) 66'
MF	17	(Mexico) César Andrade	(yellow card) 45'
MF	10	(Mexico) Juan Pablo Rodríguez
FW	11	(Mexico) Daniel Osorno
FW	58	(Argentina) Hugo Norberto Castillo
Substitutions:
GK	25	(Mexico) Isaac Mizrahi
DF	19	(Mexico) Gerardo Torres		(substituted on) 20' (substituted off) 66'
DF	20	(Mexico) José Luis González China
DF	29	(Mexico) Mario Méndez
MF	43	(Mexico) Juan Urteaga		(substituted on) 66'
FW	7	(Argentina) Eduardo Bustos	(yellow card) 80'	(substituted on) 66'
FW	9	(Argentina) Carlos Lagorio
Manager:
(Argentina) Ricardo La Volpe

Toluca:
GK	1	(Argentina) Hernán Cristante
DF	4	(Mexico) Salvador Carmona	(yellow card) 4'
DF	5	(Mexico) Omar Blanco
DF	13	(Mexico) Alberto Macías
MF	8	(Mexico) Rafael García
MF	27	(Mexico) Enrique Alfaro		(substituted off) 57'
MF	18	(Mexico) David Rangel (c)
MF	7	(Mexico) Víctor Ruiz	(yellow card) 48'
MF	10	(Chile) Fabián Estay
FW	15	(Uruguay) Carlos María Morales		(substituted off) 69'
FW	9	(Paraguay) José Cardozo
Substitutions:
GK	30	(Mexico) Mario Albarrán
DF	2	(Mexico) Eugenio Villazón
DF	19	(Mexico) Adrian García Arias	(yellow card) 67'	(substituted on) 57'
DF	21	(Mexico) Robert Charles Forbes
MF	6	(Mexico) Antonio Taboada
MF	14	(Croatia) Darko Vukić		(substituted on) 78'
MF	20	(Mexico) Hugo Santana		(substituted on) 69' (substituted off) 78'
Manager:
(Mexico) Enrique Meza

Second leg

June 6, 1999
13:00

Toluca	2–2 (a.e.t.)	Atlas
Vázquez 3'; Macías 26'	Report	Castillo 1'; Zepeda 50'
Penalties
Taboada (penalty scored); Ruiz (penalty scored); Estay (penalty missed); Vukić (penalty scored); Cardozo (penalty scored); Carmona (penalty scored)	5−4	(penalty scored) Rodríguez; (penalty scored) Zepeda; (penalty missed) Osorno; (penalty scored) Márquez; (penalty scored) Bustos; (penalty missed) Estrada

Estadio Toluca 70-86, Toluca
Referee: Gilberto Alcalá Pineda (Mexico City)

5–5 on aggregate. Toluca won 5–4 on penalty kicks.

Toluca:
GK	1	(Argentina) Hernán Cristante
DF	4	(Mexico) Salvador Carmona
DF	5	(Mexico) Omar Blanco
DF	13	(Mexico) Alberto Macías
MF	8	(Mexico) Rafael García		(substituted off) 90'
MF	27	(Mexico) Enrique Alfaro		(substituted off) 74'
MF	18	(Mexico) David Rangel (c)
MF	7	(Mexico) Víctor Ruiz	(yellow card) 80'
MF	10	(Chile) Fabián Estay
FW	9	(Paraguay) José Cardozo
FW	23	(Mexico) José Manuel Abundis		(substituted off) 65'
Substitutions:
GK	30	(Mexico) Mario Albarrán
DF	2	(Mexico) Eugenio Villazón
DF	19	(Mexico) Adrian García Arias
DF	21	(Mexico) Robert Charles Forbes
MF	6	(Mexico) Antonio Taboada		(substituted on) 90'
MF	14	(Croatia) Darko Vukić		(substituted on) 74'
FW	15	(Uruguay) Carlos María Morales		(substituted on) 65'
Manager:
(Mexico) Enrique Meza

Atlas:
GK	99	(Mexico) Erubey Cabuto
DF	22	(Mexico) Julio Estrada	(yellow card) 80'
DF	3	(Mexico) Héctor López (c)	(yellow card) 38'
DF	27	(Mexico) Rafael Márquez	(yellow card) 88'
DF	5	(Argentina) Pablo Lavallén
MF	18	(Mexico) Miguel Zepeda
MF	8	(Argentina) Jorge Almirón		(substituted off) 76'
MF	17	(Mexico) César Andrade		(substituted off) 67'
MF	10	(Mexico) Juan Pablo Rodríguez
FW	11	(Mexico) Daniel Osorno
FW	58	(Argentina) Hugo Norberto Castillo		(substituted off) 84'
Substitutions:
GK	25	(Mexico) Isaac Mizrahi
DF	19	(Mexico) Gerardo Torres
DF	20	(Mexico) José Luis González China
DF	29	(Mexico) Mario Méndez		(substituted on) 67'
MF	43	(Mexico) Juan Urteaga		(substituted on) 76'
FW	7	(Argentina) Eduardo Bustos		(substituted on) 84'
FW	9	(Argentina) Carlos Lagorio
Manager:
(Argentina) Ricardo La Volpe

Champions

5th title

== Relegation ==
Pos.	Team	Pts.	Pld.	Ave.
14.	Toros Neza	127	102	1.2450
15.	Pachuca	40	34	1.1765
16.	Monterrey	110	102	1.0784 (GD: -34)
17.	Celaya	110	102	1.0784 (GD: -35)
18.	Puebla	110	102	1.0784 (GD: -50)

Puebla was relegated to Primera División 'A', however, the team remained in the First Division because its owners bought the Unión de Curtidores, a club that had won promotion to the First Division.
