= 1998 CONCACAF Champions' Cup =

34th edition of premier club football tournament organized by CONCACAF

Tournament details
- Host country: United States
- City: Washington, D.C.
- Dates: August 11 – 16
- Teams: 8 (from 5 associations)

Final positions
- Champions: (United States) D.C. United (1st title)
- Runners-up: (Mexico) Toluca
- Third place: (Costa Rica) Saprissa
- Fourth place: (Mexico) León

Tournament statistics
- Matches played: 8
- Goals scored: 19 (2.38 per match)

The 1998 CONCACAF Champions' Cup was the 34th edition of the annual international club football competition held in the CONCACAF region (North America, Central America and the Caribbean), the CONCACAF Champions' Cup. It determined that year's club champion of football in the CONCACAF region.

The final tournament, held in Washington, D.C., was won by D.C. United, who defeated Deportivo Toluca 1–0 in the final, becoming the first team from the United States to win the tournament.

== Qualified teams ==
- (Mexico) Cruz Azul (holders) bye to final round.
- (Mexico) Toluca (Mexican summer champions 1997/98) bye to final round.
- (United States) DC United (USA champions 1997) bye to final round.

== Qualifying ==
=== Qualifying Playoff ===
June 28, 1998
18:00 MST

Colorado Rapids (United States)	1–0	(Mexico) León
Balboa 83'	Report

Mile High Stadium, Denver, United States
Attendance: 7,442
Referee: Kevin Skinner (CAN)
July 15, 1998

León (Mexico)	4–2	(United States) Colorado Rapids
Bejines 30'; Romero 38'; Trittschuh 42' (o.g.); Cadena 53'		45' Trittschuh; 69' Bravo

Estadio León, León, Mexico
- León advances to the quarterfinals.

=== Qualifying Central American zone ===
Organized by the Central American Football Union.

==== Group South A ====
Pos	Team	Pld	W	D	L	GF	GA	GD	Pts	Qualification or relegation
1	(Costa Rica) Saprissa	3	3	0	0	9	2	+7	9	Advance to Second Stage
2	(Panama) Árabe Unido	3	1	1	1	3	3	0	4	
3	(Nicaragua) Diriangén	4	0	1	3	2	9	−7	1	

Updated to match(es) played on March 11, 1998. Source: RSSSF
Rules for classification: 1) points; 2) goal difference; 3) number of goals scored.

February 8, 1998	Diriangén (Nicaragua)	0–3	(Costa Rica) Saprissa	Cacique Diriangen Stadium.
	None		Steven Bryce; Gerard Drummond; Alejandro Sequeira

February 15, 1998	Árabe Unido (Panama)	1–0	(Nicaragua) Diriangén	Panama
	Carlos Brown		None	Stadium: Colón’s Roberto Mariano Bula Stadium

February 17, 1998	Diriangén (Nicaragua)	1–1	(Panama) Árabe Unido	Colón, Panama
				Stadium: Estadio Armando Dely Valdés

February 25, 1998	Saprissa (Costa Rica)	4–1	(Nicaragua) Diriangén
	Adrian Mahia; Kervin Lacey; Vinicio Montero		Goal

March 8, 1998	Árabe Unido (Panama)	1–2	(Costa Rica) Saprissa

March 11, 1998	Saprissa (Costa Rica)	v	(Panama) Árabe Unido
Note: Cancelled due to irrelevance.

==== Group South B ====
Pos	Team	Pld	W	D	L	GF	GA	GD	Pts	Qualification or relegation
1	(Costa Rica) Alajuelense	4	4	0	0	17	2	+15	12	Advance to Second Stage
2	(Panama) Tauro	2	0	0	2	1	6	−5	0	
3	(Nicaragua) Real Estelí	2	0	0	2	1	11	−10	0	

Updated to match(es) played on March 8, 1998. Source: RSSSF
Rules for classification: 1) points; 2) goal difference; 3) number of goals scored.

February 8, 1998	Tauro (Panama)	1–2	(Costa Rica) Alajuelense	Panama City, Panama
	Luis Agrazal		David Diach; Richard Smith	Stadium: Estadio Javier Cruz de Colegio de Artes y Oficios

February 11, 1998	Alajuelense (Costa Rica)	4–0	(Panama) Tauro

February 14, 1998	Alajuelense (Costa Rica)	8–0	(Nicaragua) Real Estelí

February 17, 1998	Real Estelí (Nicaragua)	1–3	(Costa Rica) Alajuelense	Palmares de Alajuela, Costa Rica

March 8, 1998	Real Estelí (Nicaragua)	v	(Panama) Tauro
Note: Cancelled due to irrelevance.

March 1998	Tauro (Panama)	v	(Nicaragua) Real Estelí
Note: Cancelled due to irrelevance.

==== Group North A ====
Pos	Team	Pld	W	D	L	GF	GA	GD	Pts	Qualification or relegation
1	(Guatemala) Comunicaciones	3	2	1	0	13	6	+7	7	Advance to Second Stage
2	(Honduras) Olimpia	3	2	0	1	8	4	+4	6	Advance to Second Stage
3	(El Salvador) Alianza	3	0	2	1	6	9	−3	2	
4	(Belize) Juventus	3	0	1	2	5	13	−8	1	

Updated to match(es) played on March 22, 1998. Source: RSSSF
Rules for classification: 1) points; 2) goal difference; 3) number of goals scored.

March 18, 1998	Olimpia (Honduras)	2–0	(Belize) Juventus	Guatemala City, Guatemala
	Quiroga 59' 79'		Nil

March 18, 1998	Comunicaciones (Guatemala)	2–2	(El Salvador) Alianza	Guatemala City, Guatemala
	Nicolas Suazo 19'		Horacio Lugo 29'; Erick Dowson Prado

March 20, 1998	Alianza (El Salvador)	3–3	(Belize) Juventus	Guatemala City, Guatemala
	Marcelo Bauza		Fredy Tun; Steve Hall; Allan Flowers

March 20, 1998	Comunicaciones (Guatemala)	3–2	(Honduras) Olimpia	Guatemala City, Guatemala
	Fonseca 40' 67'; Rodas 76'		50' Velásquez; 85' Costa

March 22, 1998	Alianza (El Salvador)	1–4	(Honduras) Olimpia	Guatemala City, Guatemala
	Adrian de La Cruz 68' (pen.)		Costa 6' 34' 58'; Velásquez 90'

March 22, 1998	Comunicaciones (Guatemala)	8–2	(Belize) Juventus	Guatemala City, Guatemala
	Jewison Bennet 22' 53' 79'; Edgar Valencia 13' 75'; Julio Rodas 15' 69'; Edwin Westphal 82'		Doni Tun 28'; Dave McCuley 90'	Referee: Oscar Bardales

==== Group North B ====
Pos	Team	Pld	W	D	L	GF	GA	GD	Pts	Qualification or relegation
1	(Honduras) Platense	5	3	1	1	10	3	+7	10	Advance to Second Stage
2	(El Salvador) Luis Ángel Firpo	4	3	1	0	9	3	+6	10	Advance to Second Stage
3	(Guatemala) Aurora	6	1	1	4	8	12	−4	4	
4	(Belize) Real Verdes	5	1	1	3	5	14	−9	4	

Updated to match(es) played on March 25, 1998. Source: RSSSF
Rules for classification: 1) points; 2) goal difference; 3) number of goals scored.

February 1, 1998	Aurora (Guatemala)	1–2	(Honduras) Platense
	Castagnaro 60'		49' Cárcamo; 85' Da Silva

February 8, 1998	Platense (Honduras)	2–1	(Guatemala) Aurora
	Da Silva 84'; Cárcamo 85'		67' (pen.) Castagnaro

February 22, 1998	Real Verdes (Belize)	0–0	(Honduras) Platense
	Nil		Nil

February 25, 1998	Aurora (Guatemala)	2–2	(El Salvador) Luis Ángel Firpo	Guatemala City, Guatemala
	Luis Perez; Selvin Ponciano		Jose Monterrosa; Celio Rodríguez	Stadium: Estadio del Ejéricto

March 1, 1998	Platense (Honduras)	6–0	(Belize) Real Verdes
	Mejía 3' 65'; Da Silva 10'; Fuentes 44'; Morales 76' de León 84' (pen.)		Nil

March 4, 1998	Luis Ángel Firpo (El Salvador)	2–0	(Guatemala) Aurora
	Alfredo Perez; Raul Toro		Nil

March 15, 1998	Real Verdes (Belize)	1–2	(Guatemala) Aurora	San Ignacio, Belize
	TBD		TBD; Selvin Ponciano	Stadium: Norman Broaster Stadium

March 22, 1998	Luis Ángel Firpo (El Salvador)	4–1	(Belize) Real Verdes	San Ignacio, Belize
	Israel Castro; Luis Oseguera; Raul Toro; Pedro Vasquez		Crusel Treik	Stadium: Norman Broaster Stadium

March 25, 1998	Luis Ángel Firpo (El Salvador)	1–0	(Honduras) Platense
	Toro 20'		Nil

March 25, 1998	Aurora (Guatemala)	2–3	(Belize) Real Verdes

April 1, 1998	Real Verdes (Belize)	v	(El Salvador) Luis Ángel Firpo
Note: Cancelled due to irrelevance.

April 12, 1998	Platense (Honduras)	v	(El Salvador) Luis Ángel Firpo
Note: Cancelled due to irrelevance.

==== Group I ====
Pos	Team	Pld	W	D	L	GF	GA	GD	Pts	Qualification or relegation
1	(Costa Rica) Saprissa	4	2	1	1	5	3	+2	7	Advance to Final Tournament
2	(Guatemala) Comunicaciones	4	2	0	2	5	6	−1	6	Advance to Playoff
3	(Honduras) Platense	4	1	1	2	5	6	−1	4	

Updated to match(es) played on May 27, 1998. Source: RSSSF
Rules for classification: 1) points; 2) goal difference; 3) number of goals scored.

April 19, 1998	Platense (Honduras)	1–3	(Costa Rica) Saprissa
	Cárcamo 6'		16' Ramírez; 76' Myers; 90' Ilama

April 22, 1998	Comunicaciones (Guatemala)	1–0	(Costa Rica) Saprissa

April 29, 1998	Platense (Honduras)	3–1	(Guatemala) Comunicaciones	San Pedro Sula, Honduras
	Bernárdez 10' de León 46'; Cárcamo 88'		4' Valencia

May 6, 1998	Saprissa (Costa Rica)	2–1	(Guatemala) Comunicaciones

May 20, 1998	Saprissa (Costa Rica)	0–0	(Honduras) Platense

May 27, 1998	Comunicaciones (Guatemala)	2–1	(Honduras) Platense	Guatemala City, Guatemala
20:00	Westphal 55' (pen.); Fonseca 90'		85' (pen.) Fuentes	Stadium: Estadio Cementos Progreso

==== Group II ====
Pos	Team	Pld	W	D	L	GF	GA	GD	Pts	Qualification or relegation
1	(El Salvador) Luis Ángel Firpo	4	2	2	0	7	4	+3	8	Advance to Final Tournament
2	(Costa Rica) Alajuelense	4	2	1	1	9	5	+4	7	Advance to Playoff
3	(Honduras) Olimpia	4	0	1	3	2	9	−7	1	

Updated to match(es) played on May 20, 1998. Source: RSSSF
Rules for classification: 1) points; 2) goal difference; 3) number of goals scored.

April 15, 1998	Alajuelense (Costa Rica)	1–1	(El Salvador) Luis Ángel Firpo

April 22, 1998	Olimpia (Honduras)	0–1	(Costa Rica) Alajuelense
			6' Miso

April 30, 1998	Luis Ángel Firpo (El Salvador)	2–0	(Honduras) Olimpia
	Toro 48'; Monterrosa 55'

May 7, 1998	Alajuelense (Costa Rica)	5–1	(Honduras) Olimpia
	Badilla 11'; Madrigal 20'; Martins 41'; Cubero 50'; Miso 73'		75' Velásquez

May 14, 1998	Luis Ángel Firpo (El Salvador)	3–2	(Costa Rica) Alajuelense

May 20, 1998	Olimpia (Honduras)	1–1	(El Salvador) Luis Ángel Firpo
	Fernández 27'		72' Rodríguez

==== Playoff ====
July 26, 1998	Alajuelense (Costa Rica)	4–2	(Guatemala) Comunicaciones	Alajuela, Costa Rica
				Stadium: Estadio Alejandro Morera Soto

July 29, 1998	Comunicaciones (Guatemala)	1–1 (3–5 agg.)	(Costa Rica) Alajuelense	Guatemala City, Guatemala
				Stadium: Estadio Mateo Flores

- Alajuelense advanced to the Final Tournament.

=== Caribbean zone ===
- Caribbean Zone:
  (Trinidad and Tobago) Joe Public F.C. (invitee)
- The Caribbean club championships during that time were only played in November,
  CONCACAF invited Joe Public of Trinidad and Tobago as Caribbean representative.

== Bracket ==
Quarterfinals
August 11 – Washington, D.C
(United States) D.C. United	8
(Trinidad and Tobago) Joe Public	0
August 11 – Washington, D.C
(Mexico) León (p)	1 (3)
(El Salvador) Luis Ángel Firpo	1 (2)
August 12 – Washington, D.C
(Mexico) Cruz Azul	0 (3)
(Costa Rica) Deportivo Saprissa (p)	0 (5)
August 12 – Washington, D.C
(Mexico) Toluca	2
(Costa Rica) Alajuelense	0

Semifinals
August 14 – Washington, D.C
(United States) D.C. United	2
(Mexico) León	0
August 14 – Washington, D.C
(Costa Rica) Deportivo Saprissa	1 (2)
(Mexico) Toluca (p)	1 (3)

Final
August 16 – Washington, D.C
(United States) D.C. United	1
(Mexico) Toluca	0
Third place
August 16 – Washington, D.C
(Mexico) León	0
(Costa Rica) Deportivo Saprissa	2

== Quarterfinals ==
August 11, 1998

D.C. United (United States)	8–0	(Trinidad and Tobago) Joe Public
Olsen 13' 44'; Lassiter 22' 29' 67' 72'; Wood 75' 90+2'

RFK Stadium, Washington, D.C., United States
Attendance: 7,117

August 11, 1998

Cruz Azul (Mexico)	0–0 (a.e.t.)	(Costa Rica) Saprissa
Penalties
	3–5

RFK Stadium, Washington, D.C., United States
Attendance: 7,117

August 12, 1998

León (Mexico)	1–1 (a.e.t.)	(El Salvador) Luis Ángel Firpo
Mercado 27' (pen.)		79' Nildeson
Penalties
	3–2

RFK Stadium, Washington, D.C., United States

August 12, 1998

Toluca (Mexico)	2–0	(Costa Rica) Alajuelense
Estay 72'; Abundis 90'

RFK Stadium, Washington, D.C., United States

== Semifinals ==
August 14, 1998

D.C. United (United States)	2–0	(Mexico) Club León
Lassiter 12', 61'

Robert F. Kennedy Memorial Stadium
Washington, D.C., United States

August 14, 1998

Deportivo Toluca (Mexico)	1–1 (a.e.t.)	(Costa Rica) Deportivo Saprissa
Cordero 31' (o.g.)		Sequeira 58'
Penalties
	3–2

Robert F. Kennedy Memorial Stadium
Washington, D.C., United States

== Third place match ==
August 16, 1998

Club León (Mexico)	0–2	(Costa Rica) C.D. Saprissa
		Mahia 45'; Centeno 85'

Robert F. Kennedy Memorial Stadium
Washington, D.C., United States

== Final ==
August 16, 1998

D.C. United (United States)	1–0	(Mexico) Deportivo Toluca
Pope 41'

Robert F. Kennedy Memorial Stadium
Washington, D.C., United States
Attendance: 12,607
Referee: Carlos Batres – Guatemala

Team details

D.C. United	Toluca

GK		(United States) Scott Garlick
DF		(United States) Carey Talley	Booked
DF	23	(United States) Eddie Pope
DF		(United States) Jeff Agoos
DF		(United States) Brian Kamler
MF		(United States) Ben Olsen
MF	6	(United States) John Harkes
MF		(United States) Richie Williams
MF	10	(Bolivia) Marco Etcheverry
FW	99	(Bolivia) Jaime Moreno	(substituted off) 75'
FW	15	(United States) Roy Lassiter	Booked
Substitutes:
FW		(United States) Carlos Llamosa	(substituted on) 75'
Manager:
(United States) Bruce Arena

GK	(Mexico) Mario Albarrán
DF	(Mexico) Salvador Carmona
DF	(Mexico) Héctor O. Blanco
DF	(Mexico) Alberto Macías	Booked
DF	(Mexico) Antonio Taboada	(yellow card) (substituted off) 59'
MF	(Mexico) Víctor Ruiz
MF	(Chile) Fabián Estay	Booked
MF	(Mexico) David Rangel
MF	(Mexico) Enrique Alfaro	(substituted on) 70'
FW	(Paraguay) José S. Cardozo	Booked
FW	(Mexico) Juan Manuel Abundis	(substituted off) 75'
Substitutes:
MF	(Croatia) Darko Vukić	(substituted on) 59'
DF	(Mexico) Adrian García Arias	(substituted on) 70'
MF	(Mexico) José J. Ordiales	(substituted on) 75'
Manager:
(Mexico) Enrique Meza

== Champion ==
CONCACAF Champions' Cup
1998 Winners

D.C. United
First Title

== Player awards ==
=== Top goalscorer ===
- Roy Lassiter (D.C. United) – 6 goals

=== Most Valuable Player ===
- Roy Lassiter (D.C. United)

=== Team of the tournament ===
Goalkeeper

- Scott Garlick, D.C. United

Defenders

- Jeff Agoos, D.C. United
- Eddie Pope, D.C. United
- Salvador Carmona, Toluca
- Roberto Medina, Leon

Midfielders

- Fabian Estay, Toluca
- Marco Etcheverry, D.C. United
- Roy Myers, Saprissa

Forwards

- Roy Lassiter, D.C. United
- Jose Manuel Abundis, Toluca
- Nidelson De Mello, Firpo
