= List of Toluca FC players =

Toluca FC is a Mexican football club based in Toluca. The team play in the Liga MX – the highest tier in the Mexican football league system. The club was founded in 1917.

== Most capped players ==
Statistics correct as of start of 2018–19 season

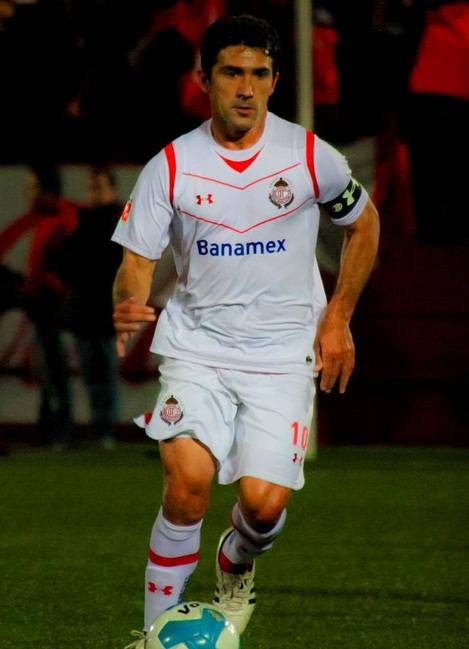
Sinha is Toluca's most capped player with 543 appearances for the club.

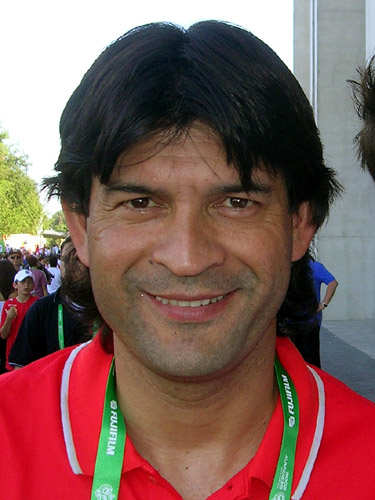
José Cardozo is Toluca's historic top scorer with 248 goals. He also holds the Liga MX record of more goals scored during a season with 58.

The following is a list of players who have made 100 or more first team appearances for the club. This consists of appearances in Liga MX, Ascenso MX, Copa MX, CONCACAF Champions League, Copa Libertadores, Copa Sudamericana, and their predecessors. Players with fewer appearances are also included if they are a club record holder, or have won a notable individual award with the club.

Name	Nat	Position	Toluca career	Apps	Goals	Notes
Walter Gassire	(Uruguay)	Goalkeeper	1974–1980	150	0	
Wilson Graniolatti	(Uruguay)	Defender	1986–1988, 1989–1990	103	6	
Marcelino Bernal	(Mexico)	Midfielder	1991–1997	130	30	
José Manuel Abundis	(Mexico)	Forward	1992–2000, 2004–2006	260	80	
Hernan Cristante	(Argentina)	Goalkeeper	1993–1994, 1995–1996, 1998–2010	419	0	
Enrique Alfaro	(Mexico)	Midfielder	1994–2002	226	31	
José Cardozo	(Paraguay)	Forward	1995–2005	329	248	
Rafael García Torres	(Mexico)	Midfielder	1998–2004	214	27	
Sinha	(Mexico)	Midfielder	1999–2014, 2016–2017	543	61	
Vicente Sánchez	(Uruguay)	Forward	2001–2007	242	85	
Sergio Amaury Ponce	(Mexico)	Midfielder	2001–2008	184	18	
Miguel Almazán	(Mexico)	Defender	2002–2010, 2013–2016	112	2	
Paulo da Silva	(Paraguay)	Defender	2003–2009, 2013–2017	379	30	
Édgar Dueñas	(Mexico)	Defender	2004–2015	305	15	
Carlos Esquivel	(Mexico)	Midfielder	2005–2017, 2019–	432	45	
Néstor Calderón	(Mexico)	Midfielder	2008–2012	137	22	
Antonio Ríos	(Mexico)	Midfielder	2008–	314	13	
Alfredo Talavera	(Mexico)	Goalkeeper	2009–	321	1	
Isaác Brizuela	(Mexico)	Forward	2009–2012, 2013–2014	149	13	
Osvaldo González	(Chile)	Defender	2010–2011, 2016–	132	8	
Pablo Velázquez	(Paraguay)	Forward	2013–2017	109	17	
Édgar Benítez	(Paraguay)	Forward	2012–2015	109	17	
Fernando Uribe	(Colombia)	Forward	2015–2018	100	46	

== Most decorated players ==
Player	Achievements	Titles	Source
(Mexico) Antonio Naelson	Won five league championships with Toluca: Verano 2000, Apertura 2002, Apertura 2005, Apertura 2008, and Bicentenario 2010, as well as the 2003 CONCACAF Champions' Cup.	6
(Paraguay) José Saturnino Cardozo	Won five league championships with Toluca: Verano 1998, Verano 1999, Verano 2000, Apertura 2002, and Apertura 2005, as well as the 2003 CONCACAF Champions' Cup.	6
(Argentina) Hernán Cristante	Won five league championships with Toluca: Verano 1999, Verano 2000, Apertura 2002, Apertura 2005, and Apertura 2008, as well as the 2003 CONCACAF Champions' Cup.	6
(Mexico) José Manuel Abundis	Won four league championships with Toluca: Verano 1998, Verano 1999, Verano 2000, and Apertura 2005, as well as the 2003 CONCACAF Champions' Cup.	5
(Mexico) David Rangel	Won four league championships with Toluca: Verano 1998, Verano 1999, Verano 2000, and Apertura 2005.	4
(Mexico) Alberto Macías	Won three league championships with Toluca: Verano 1998, Verano 1999, and Verano 2000.	3
(Paraguay) Paulo da Silva	Won two league championships with Toluca: Apertura 2005 and Apertura 2008, as well as the 2003 CONCACAF Champions' Cup.	3

== FIFA World Cup players ==
The following players from Toluca were called up to represent the Mexico national football team in the FIFA World Cup.

- (Mexico) Carlos Carús (1954)
- (Mexico) Manuel Camacho (1958)
- (Mexico) Jorge Romo (1958)
- (Mexico) Carlos Blanco (1954, 1958) (Note: Carlos Blanco was born in Madrid, Spain, and became a naturalized Mexican citizen in 1950. He was selected for Mexico's squads at the 1954 and 1958 FIFA World Cups.)
- (Mexico) Enrique Sesma (1958)
- (Mexico) Pedro Romero (1962)
- (Mexico) Alfredo del Águila (1962)
- (Mexico) José Vantolrá (1970)
- (Mexico) Rigoberto Cisneros (1978)
- (Mexico) Javier Cárdenas (1978)
- (Mexico) Mario Medina (1978)
- (Mexico) Jorge Rodríguez (1994)
- (Mexico) Marcelino Bernal (1994)
- (Mexico) Jaime Ordiales (1998)
- (Mexico) Salvador Carmona (1998, 2002)
- (Mexico) Rafael García (2002, 2006)
- (Mexico) Antonio Naelson (2006) (Note: Antonio Naelson "Sinha" was born in Brazil and acquired Mexican citizenship in 2004. He was selected for Mexico's squad at the 2006 FIFA World Cup.)
- (Mexico) Alfredo Talavera (2014, 2018))
- (Mexico) Miguel Ponce (2014
- (Mexico) Isaac Brizuela (2014)
- (Mexico) Jesús Gallardo (2026)
- (Mexico) Alexis Vega (2026)
