= Enrique Alfaro =

Enrique Alfaro may refer to:

- Enrique Alfaro Ramírez (born 1973), Mexican politician.
- Enrique Alfaro (footballer) (born 1974), Mexican professional football player.
