= Julio Estrada =

Julio Estrada may refer to:

- Julio Estrada (composer) (born 1943), Mexican composer, musicologist and theoretician
- Julio Estrada (wrestler) (born 1970), known as Rico Suave, Puerto Rican professional wrestler and manager
- Julio Héctor Estrada (born 1974), Guatemalan politician
- Julio Estrada (footballer) (born 1977), Mexican football manager and former footballer
