= Batrović =

Batrović (Serbian Cyrillic: Батровић) is a Serbo-Croatian surname, traditionally found in Brčeli in Crmnica, Montenegro. It is also found in Balabani in Podgorica (1926 source), Beli Manastir and Osijek in Croatia, and in Serbia. Bearers are Orthodox Christian, declaring as Serbs and Montenegrins.

- Veljko Batrović (born 1994)
- Zoran Batrović (born 1958) Montenegrin former footballer
- Dejan Batrović (born 1971) Montenegrin former footballer

== See also ==
- Batrić, given name
