= Adolfo Ríos =

Mexican footballer (born 1966)

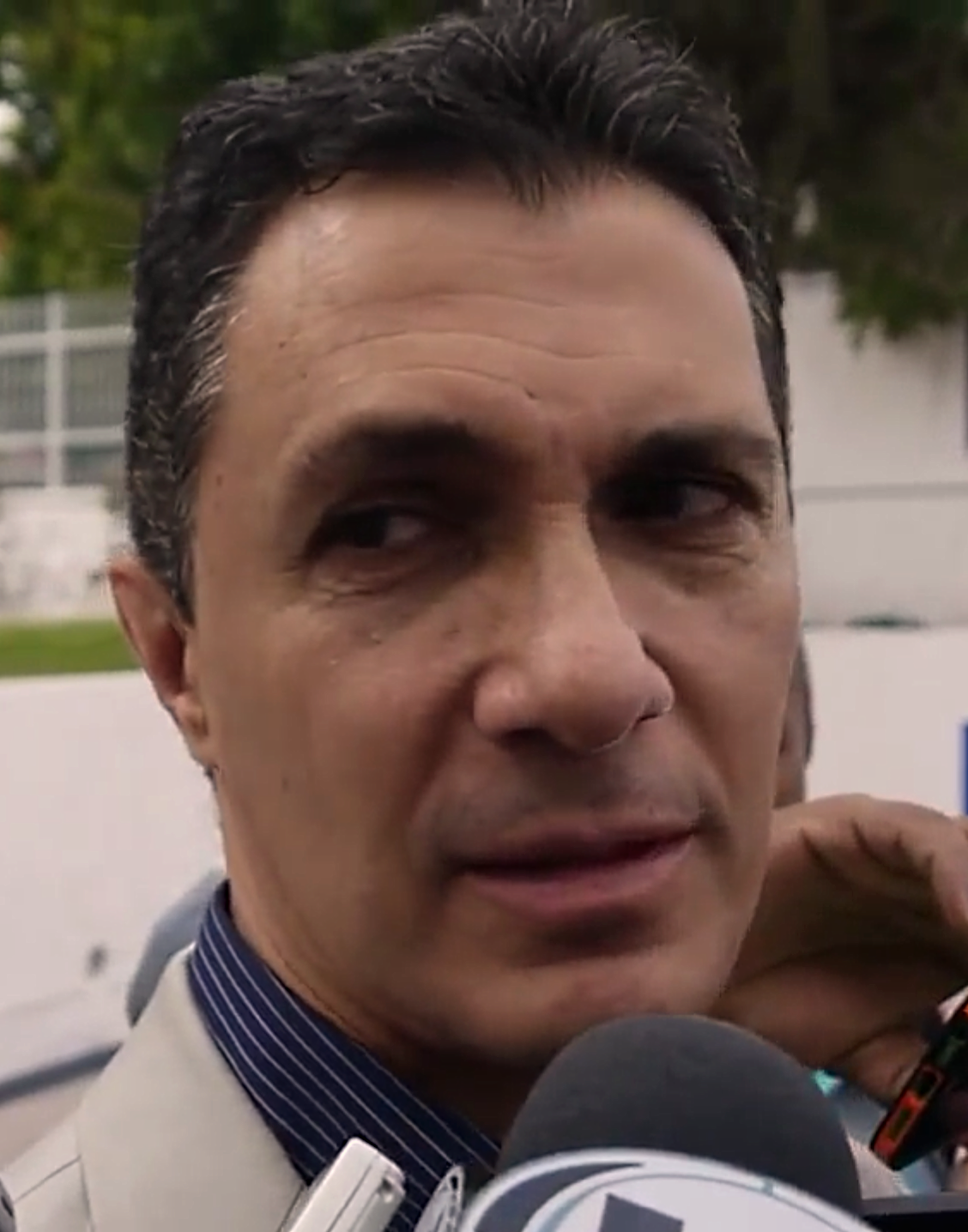
- Ríos in 2014

Personal information
- Full name: José Adolfo Ríos García
- Date of birth: 11 December 1966 (age 59)
- Place of birth: Uruapan, Michoacán, Mexico
- Height: 1.75 m (5 ft 9 in)
- Position: Goalkeeper

Senior career*
Years	Team	Apps	(Gls)
1985–1990	UNAM	116	(0)
1990–1997	Veracruz	237	(0)
1997–1999	Necaxa	72	(0)
1999–2004	América	153	(0)
Total		578	(0)

International career
1988–2003	Mexico	36	(0)
Medal record
Representing Mexico
Third place	Copa America	1997
Third place	Copa America	1999
- * Club domestic league appearances and goals

José Adolfo Ríos García (born 11 December 1966) is a Mexican former professional footballer who played as a goalkeeper. He won the 1999 U.S. Cup with Mexico. Ríos is regarded as one of the best Mexican goalkeepers of his generation, though he never represented the national team at a FIFA World Cup.

== Club career ==
Ríos García made his debut for UNAM in 1985 and remained there until 1990, when he went to play for Veracruz. He was a starter for Veracruz, playing 7 years, making over 230 appearances for the team. In 1997, he went on to play for Necaxa. In the winter of 1998, he won the Mexican Primera División for the first time, defeating Chivas de Guadalajara on an aggregate score of 0–2. He continued to play with the club for one more season, making 72 appearances with the club in total. In the summer of 1999, he transferred to Club America, and became an instant starter. In the summer of 2002, he was the starting goalkeeper for America in their victory against Necaxa in the Championship Final, which allowed him to win the second Mexican Primera División title of his career, and Club America's ninth overall. In the Clausura 2004, Ríos suffered an injury, which ruled him out for several weeks. He was replaced in goal by Guillermo Ochoa. Later, both Ríos and Ochoa shared the starting spot, and after the quarter-final, in which America was eliminated, Ríos announces his retirement from professional football at 37 years of age, following a career spanning about two decades.

== International career ==
At international level, Ríos played for Mexico as starter at two Copa América tournaments, in 1997 and 1999. At both editions of the competition, he helped Mexico reach the semi-finals and obtain third place medals. He was starter at the 1999 Nike US Cup, which Mexico won.

== Personal life ==
In 2012, Ríos was presented as the new president of Club Querétaro. He resigned at the end of 2014, after 2 years in service. Rios was known as "El Arquero De Cristo".

== Honours ==
Necaxa

- Mexican Primera División: Invierno 1998

América

- Mexican Primera División: Verano 2002
- InterLiga: 2004

Individual

- Mexican Primera División Golden Glove: 1996–97, 1997 Invierno, 1998 Verano, Invierno 1998, Verano 1999, Invierno 1999
