= Edgardo Prátola =

Argentine footballer

Personal information
- Full name: Edgardo Fabián Prátola
- Date of birth: May 20, 1969
- Place of birth: La Plata, Argentina
- Date of death: April 28, 2002 (Aged 32)
- Place of death: La Plata, Argentina
- Height: 1.89 m (6 ft 2 in)
- Position: Centre back

Senior career*
Years	Team	Apps	(Gls)
1988–1996	Estudiantes	197	(7)
1996–1999	León	82	(6)
1999–2000	Unión de Santa Fe	28	(2)
2000–2002	Estudiantes	20	(0)
- * Club domestic league appearances and goals as of 22 October 2007

Edgardo Fabián Prátola (20 May 1969 in La Plata – 28 April 2002 in La Plata) was an Argentine football player.

His career started as a defender with Estudiantes de La Plata, where his devotion was noted as one of the reasons the club returned from relegation in 1995. Prátola wore the No. 6 jersey and was the captain of the team.

Prátola played for Mexican side León between 1996 and 1999, after which he returned to Argentina to play for Unión de Santa Fe, and then returned to Estudiantes in 2000. Diagnosed with colon cancer in 2000, he broke the news himself in an unassuming way, quit the team after unsuccessful surgery, and fought his illness to the end. The day before his death he asked that Estudiantes play their next match (against Independiente) and not ask for a postponement. A touching ceremony was held before the game.

He is fondly remembered by Estudiantes fans by his nickname El Ruso (the Russian).

After winning the Apertura 2006 championship in a play-off against Boca Juniors, many Estudiantes players displayed T-shirts in honour of Prátola. Then-captain Juan Sebastian Verón mentioned him in an emotional victory speech broadcast around the stadium, leading to chanting of "Ruso" by Estudiantes fans.

Prátola was again remembered by Estudiantes following the club's triumph in the 2009 Copa Libertadores finals against Cruzeiro. In the post-match celebrations, Estudiantes players wore shirts that said, "Ruso, estás con nosotros" ("Ruso, you are with us").
