= Dejan Batrović =

Montenegrin footballer

Personal information
- Full name: Dejan Batrović
- Date of birth: 25 October 1971 (age 55)
- Place of birth: Titograd, SFR Yugoslavia
- Height: 1.85 m (6 ft 1 in)
- Position: Striker

Senior career*
Years	Team	Apps	(Gls)
1990–1991	Budućnost Titograd	7	(0)
1993–1995	Radnički Beograd	79	(22)
1996	Getafe	18	(4)
1996–1997	Ourense	33	(8)
1997	León	6	(1)
1998	Xerez	13	(2)
1998	Rad	8	(0)
1999	Shandong Luneng	4	(0)
2000–2004	Zeta	74	(21)
2004–2006	Rad	24	(0)
Total		258	(58)
- * Club domestic league appearances and goals

Dejan Batrović (Cyrillic: Дејан Батровић; born 25 October 1971) is a Montenegrin former professional footballer who played as a striker.

== Club career ==
Batrović played for Budućnost Titograd in the 1990–91 Yugoslav First League. He later spent two and a half seasons at Radnički Beograd in the First League of FR Yugoslavia (1993–1995), before transferring abroad to Spanish club Getafe in early 1996. After spending one full season with fellow Segunda División side Ourense, Batrović briefly played for Mexican club León (1997). He subsequently returned to the Iberian Peninsula and joined Xerez in early 1998. During the early 2000s, Batrović played for Zeta in the First League of Serbia and Montenegro (2000–2004).
