= Édgar García de Dios =

Mexican footballer (1977–2010)

Personal information
- Full name: Édgar Arturo García de Dios
- Date of birth: 1 September 1977
- Place of birth: Mexico City, Mexico
- Date of death: 27 June 2010 (aged 32)
- Place of death: Naucalpan, Mexico
- Height: 1.75 m (5 ft 9 in)

Senior career*
Years	Team	Apps	(Gls)
1995–1996	Atlante		
1996–1997	LASK	12	(0)
1997–1999	Toluca	5	(0)
1999–2000	Tecos UAG	4	(0)
- * Club domestic league appearances and goals

Édgar Arturo García de Dios (1 September 1977 – 27 June 2010) was a Mexican professional footballer who played as a forward.

== Club career ==
Born in Mexico City, García made his debut with Atlante F.C. in the Mexico First Division in the 1995–96 season. He then moved to play in Toluca, and Verano. After a brief season in LASK in Second Division in Austria, he returned for season 1999–2000 to play with Tecos UAG.

== Personal life ==
He was a son of Arturo and Margarita García. As of 2002, García did not play professional football anymore after he had become an alcoholic, effectively ending his football career prematurely.

=== Death ===
García was shot with seven bullets at close range while in a taxi cab in Naucalpan. The motives of the killing are not clear.
