= Erubey Cabuto =

Mexican footballer (born 1975)

Personal information
- Full name: Erubey Cabuto García
- Date of birth: 6 September 1975 (age 51)
- Place of birth: Tepic, Nayarit, Mexico
- Height: 1.80 m (5 ft 11 in)
- Position: Goalkeeper

Senior career*
Years	Team	Apps	(Gls)
1995–2002	Atlas	221	(0)
2002–2004	Querétaro	48	(0)
2004–2006	Chiapas	6	(0)
2006–2007	Querétaro	4	(0)
Total		279	(0)

International career
2001	Mexico	2	(0)
- * Club domestic league appearances and goals

Erubey Cabuto García (born 6 September 1975) is a Mexican former professional football goalkeeper. He won one cap for the Mexico national team and was a member of the Mexican squad at the 2001 FIFA Confederations Cup.

== Career ==
Born in Tepic, Cabuto began playing professional football with F.C. Atlas. He made his Primera debut against Santos Laguna on 23 December 1995.

Cabuto joined Querétaro F.C. in 2002. He also had a stint with Chiapas before finishing his playing career with Querétaro in 2007.
