= Juan Ramón Fleita =

Argentine footballer (born 1972)

Juan Ramón Fleita (born 23 May 1972) is an Argentine football manager and former who played as a forward for clubs in Argentina, Chile, Mexico, Bolivia, Paraguay, Uruguay, Venezuela and Guatemala.

== Teams ==
- Racing Club 1990–1996
- San Lorenzo 1996–1997
- Toros Neza 1997–1999
- Bella Vista 2000
- Coquimbo Unido 2000
- Toros Neza 2001
- Huracán 2002–2004
- Guaraní 2005
- Monagas 2005
- The Strongest 2005
- Comunicaciones 2006
- Unión de Sunchales 2006–2007
- Gimnasia y Esgrima de Concepción del Uruguay 2007–2008
