= Eugenio Villazón =

Mexican football player and coach (born 1972)

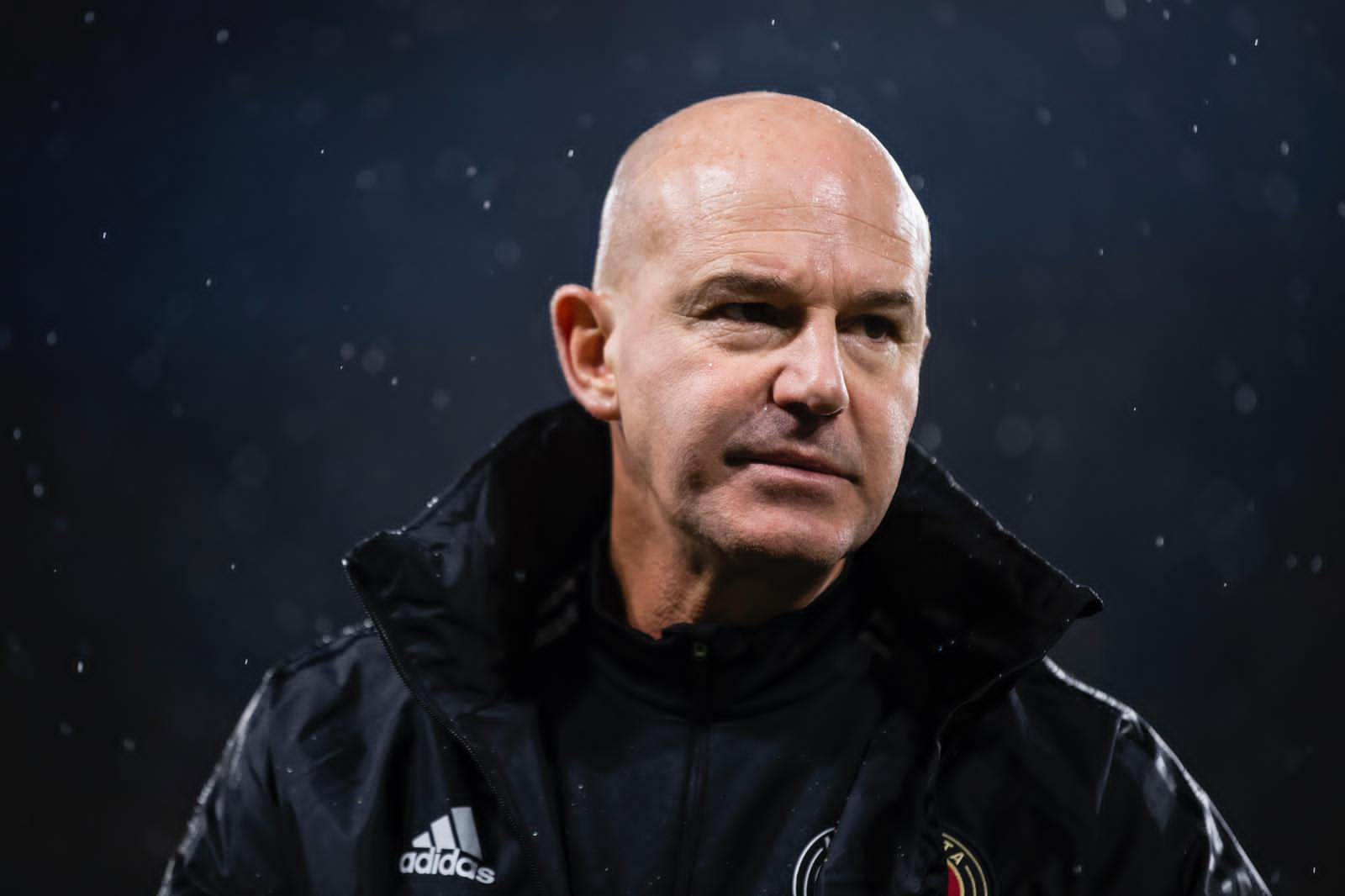

Personal information
- Full name: Eugenio Manuel Villazón Laso
- Date of birth: September 19, 1972 (age 54)
- Place of birth: Mexico City, Mexico
- Height: 1.82 m (5 ft 11 1/2 in)
- Position: Defender

Senior career*
Years	Team	Apps	(Gls)
1994–2002	Toluca	103	(8)
2002	León	15	(1)

Managerial career
- 2003–2004: Cruz Azul (assistant)
- 2004–2005: Toluca (assistant)
- 2006–2009: Pachuca (assistant)
- 2009–2012: Cruz Azul (assistant)
- 2012–2013: Toluca (assistant)
- 2013–2014: Pachuca (assistant)
- 2015–2016: Morelia (assistant)
- 2017–2019: Morelia (assistant)
- 2021: Toluca (assistant)
- 2022–2024: Atlanta United (assistant)
- * Club domestic league appearances and goals

Eugenio Manuel Villazón Laso (born September 19, 1972) is a Mexican professional football coach and former player, currently leading the C.F. Pachuca Academy, with more than 20 years of experience in professional soccer, totaling more than 750 official games in his coaching career. As an assistant coach, he has won championships such as the CONMEBOL South American Cup in 2006 with C.F. Pachuca, as well as a Mexican League championship, and two CONCACAF championships in 2007 and 2008. As a soccer player he was champion three times with Toluca. He has been in charge of developing youth teams at the club level in Morelia and at the national level in Guatemala. He also has experience as an assistant coach in MLS with Atlanta United.

== Club career ==
As a player, Villazón debuted in the 1994–1995 season for Toluca, where he played for almost his entire career. During his time at Deportivo Toluca, he won three Primera División championships: Verano 1998, Verano 1999 and Verano 2000. He scored a total of 8 goals throughout his career. Villazón retired in 2002, after playing one season in León F.C. in promotion division.

== Assistant Coach career ==
Villazón began his coaching career in March 2003, working under Enrique Meza at Cruz Azul. Meza had previously managed Villazón when Villazón was playing for Deportivo Toluca. The next season, both coaches moved to Toluca. In June 2006, Meza was named head coach of Pachuca and brought along Villazón as an assistant coach. During their time at Pachuca, Villazón won the Copa Sudamericana, two CONCACAF Champions League Cups, one league championship, and participated twice in the FIFA Club World Cup. For the 2009–10 season, Meza and Villazón returned to Cruz Azul, where they were runners-up in the Apertura 2009 tournament and the 2009–10 CONCACAF Champions League. After that, Meza and Villazón managed Toluca for the 2012–13 season and Pachuca for the 2013–14 season.

Villazón worked as an assistant coach for Morelia for the 2015–2016 season.

While serving as the Academy Director for Monarcas Morelia, he simultaneously began working with the first-division team. In February 2017, he joined forces with Roberto Hernández to co-manage the first team, facing the challenge of preventing relegation. They successfully kept the club in the First Division and held their positions for two years, until February 2019. During this time, they reached the runner-up spot in the 2017 Clausura MX Cup and qualified for the league playoffs three consecutive times.

He served as an assistant coach with Toluca in 2021.

Eugenio Villazón was considered as one of the five finalist candidates to coach Guatemala's senior national team, a position finally assigned to Luis Fernando Tena in December 2021.

Between January 2022 and June 2024, Eugenio Villazón joined Gonzalo Pineda's coaching staff as an assistant coach of the Major League Soccer club Atlanta United.

== Games statistics as Assistant Coach ==
As of match played June 2, 2024

Team	Nat	From	To	Record				
Team	Nat	From	To	G	W	D	L	Won points %
Cruz Azul	Mexico	March 1, 2003	April 31, 2004	45	16	11	18	43.70%
Toluca	Mexico	December 8, 2004	April 31, 2005	12	4	3	5	41.67%
Pachuca	Mexico	May 25, 2006	May 31, 2009	151	72	34	45	55.19%
Cruz Azul	Mexico	June 1, 2009	May 15, 2012	126	61	29	36	56.08%
Toluca	Mexico	May 21, 2012	May 5, 2013	53	23	10	20	49.69%
Pachuca	Mexico	September 4, 2013	November 30, 2014	61	23	17	21	46.99%
Monarcas Morelia	Mexico	May 22, 2015	October 23, 2016	67	25	16	26	45.27%
Monarcas Morelia	Mexico	January 16, 2017	February 24, 2019	105	44	26	35	50.16%
Toluca	Mexico	January 6, 2021	November 30, 2021	38	13	11	14	43.86%
Atlanta United	United States	January 20, 2022	June 3, 2024	94	31	27	36	42.55%
Total				752	312	184	256	49.65%

https://ligamx.net/cancha/cuerpotecnico/4776/eugenio-manuel-villazon-laso

https://www.mlssoccer.com/standings/2023/conference

GAMES SUMMARY SINCE MARCH 2003 TO PRESENT	GP	W	T	L	RC
Mexican Stats with Mexican Teams	607	254	149	204	0
International Stats with Mexican Teams	51	27	8	16	0
American Stats with American Teams	91	31	26	35	0
International Stats with American Teams	2	0	1	1	0
TOTAL	752	312	184	256	0

== Executive ==
Since January 2017, Villazón has been instrumental in developing youth talent, first as Director of Monarcas Morelia Reserves and Academy, and later as the leader of Guatemala's National Youth Soccer Teams. His commitment to youth development continues as he serves as the Academy Director at C.F. Pachuca, a position he assumed in September 2024.

== Honours ==
=== Player ===
Toluca

- Mexican Primera División: Verano 1998, Verano 1999, Verano 2000

=== Assistant manager ===
Pachuca

- Copa Sudamericana: 2006
- CONCACAF Champions' Cup: 2007, 2008
- Mexican Primera División: Clausura 2007
