= Víctor Ruiz (Mexican footballer) =

Mexican footballer (born 1969)

Víctor Ruiz del Valle (born 7 June 1969) is a Mexican former football midfielder with Cruz Azul.

== Life ==
Born in Santiago Tepeyahualco, Hidalgo, Mexico.

== Career ==
He made his professional debut with Cruz Azul in the 1992–93 Mexican Primera División season. He was sold to Toluca FC in 1996, where he would win three Primera titles (Verano 1998, Verano 1999 and Verano 2000). He finished his career with Club Necaxa, retiring in 2006.

Ruiz made 17 appearances and scored six goals for the Mexico national team, participating in the 2001 FIFA Confederations Cup and the qualifiers for the 2002 FIFA World Cup.

=== International goals ===
Scores and results list Mexico's goal tally first.

| Goal | Date | Venue | Opponent | Score | Result | Competition |
|---|---|---|---|---|---|---|
| 1. | 29 November 1995 | Rose Bowl, Pasadena, United States | Colombia | 1–0 | 2–2 | Friendly |
| 2. | 3 September 2000 | Estadio Azteca, Mexico City, Mexico | Panama | 1–0 | 7–1 | 2002 FIFA World Cup qualification |
| 3. | 27 September 2000 | Buck Shaw Stadium, Santa Clara, United States | Bolivia | 1–0 | 1–0 | Friendly |
| 4. | 8 October 2000 | Estadio Azteca, Mexico City, Mexico | Trinidad and Tobago | 7–0 | 7–0 | 2002 FIFA World Cup qualification |
| 5. | 1 June 2001 | Ulsan Munsu Football Stadium, Ulsan, South Korea | South Korea | 1–1 | 1–2 | 2001 FIFA Confederations Cup |
| 6. | 20 June 2001 | Estadio Olímpico Metropolitano, San Pedro Sula, Honduras | Honduras | 1–3 | 1–3 | 2002 FIFA World Cup qualification |

== Honours ==
Toluca

- Mexican Primera División: Verano 1998, Verano 1999, Verano 2000
