= David Rangel (footballer, born 1969) =

Mexican footballer

Personal information
- Full name: José David Rangel Torres
- Date of birth: November 12, 1969 (age 56)
- Place of birth: San Luis Potosí, Mexico
- Height: 1.72 m (5 ft 8 in)
- Position: Midfielder

Senior career*
Years	Team	Apps	(Gls)
1988–1989	Atlético Potosino	13	(0)
1989–1990	Tampico Madero	19	(2)
1990–1996	Cruz Azul	98	(5)
1996–2002	Toluca	215	(1)
2001–2003	Atlante	27	(0)
2002–2004	Chiapas	17	(0)
2004–2005	Toluca	11	(0)

International career
1992	Mexico U23	2	(0)
2001	Mexico	5	(0)

Managerial career
- 2006: Atlético Mexiquense
- 2007: Tigres UANL (Assistant)
- 2009: Chiapas Reserves and Academy
- 2010–2011: San Luis Reserves and Academy
- 2013–2014: Atlético San Luis Premier
- 2014: Santos de Soledad
- 2015–2016: Potros UAEM (Assistant)
- 2016–2017: Toluca (Assistant)
- 2018–2019: Potros UAEM
Medal record
Men's football
Representing Mexico
Pan American Games
Silver medal – second place	1991 Havana	Team
- * Club domestic league appearances and goals

José David Rangel Torres (born November 12, 1969) is a Mexican former professional footballer who played as a midfielder.

== Career ==
A defensive midfielder, Rangel began his career with Atletico Potosino and Tampico Madero, joining Cruz Azul in 1990. With his playing time diminishing, he moved to Toluca in 1996 and began a long run of success with the club. The team won the Verano tournaments of 1998, 1999, and 2000, with Rangel starting most matches and providing defensive support for teammates such as José Saturnino Cardozo. He moved to Atlante for the Verano 2002 season, then joined Chiapas before returning to Toluca for his final top-division season in 2005.

Rangel was a member of the Mexican Olympic team that competed at the 1992 Summer Olympics in Barcelona, Spain, playing against Denmark and Australia. He also earned five caps for the full Mexico national team, all of them in 2001 after the appointment of former Toluca coach Enrique Meza. Rangel made his debut on January 24, 2001, in a friendly match against Bulgaria in Morelos, a 0–2 loss. His final call-up came at the 2001 FIFA Confederations Cup, which ended with Mexico suffering first-round elimination after three defeats. The last cap for Rangel came in a 4–0 loss against France on June 3, 2001, at Ulsan Munsu Football Stadium in South Korea.
