= Sergio Vázquez (Uruguayan footballer) =

Uruguayan footballer (born 1972)

Personal information
- Full name: Sergio Marcelo Vázquez Robledo
- Date of birth: 14 October 1972 (age 54)
- Place of birth: Trinidad, Uruguay
- Height: 1.73 m (5 ft 8 in)
- Position: Forward

Youth career
- 1986: Nacional de Flores
- 1987–1988: Montevideo Wanderers

Senior career*
Years	Team	Apps	(Gls)
1989–1994	Montevideo Wanderers		
1994	Deportes Temuco	26	(6)
1995	Rangers	25	(12)
1996	Deportes Antofagasta	29	(16)
1997–2000	Necaxa	115	(37)
2000–2001	Tigres UANL	28	(7)
2001–2003	Puebla	60	(13)
2003	Nacional	12	(1)
2004–2005	Rangers	32	(7)
- * Club domestic league appearances and goals

Sergio Marcelo Vázquez Robledo (born 14 October 1972) is a Uruguayan former football player. He played for clubs in Uruguay, Chile and México.

== Career ==
In Chile, Vázquez played for Deportes Temuco, Deportes Antofagasta, and Rangers.

He was part of Necaxa's squad that finished third in the 2000 FIFA Club World Championship.

In 2003, he had a stint with Nacional in his homeland.
