= Julio Estrada (footballer) =

Mexican footballer and manager (born 1977)

Personal information
- Full name: Julio Vladimir Estrada León
- Date of birth: 6 May 1977 (age 49)
- Place of birth: Atotonilco de Tula, Hidalgo, Mexico
- Height: 1.86 m (6 ft 1 in)
- Position: Defender

Senior career*
Years	Team	Apps	(Gls)
1996–1999	Atlas	53	(1)
2000–2001	Monterrey	10	(1)
2002	Reboceros de La Piedad	19	(0)
2002	Querétaro	18	(0)
2003	Atlas	8	(0)
2006	Guadalajara	1	(0)

Managerial career
- 2010: Zapotlanejo (Assistant)
- 2010: Delfines (Assistant)
- 2011–2012: Zapotlanejo
- 2013: Atlético Tecomán
- 2014–2015: Atlas Reserves and Academy
- 2015: Académicos de Atlas
- 2015–2016: Atlas (Assistant)
- 2016: Atlas Reserves and Academy
- 2017: Atlas Premier
- 2017: Mineros de Zacatecas Premier
- 2018: Alacranes de Durango
- * Club domestic league appearances and goals

Julio Vladimir Estrada León (born May 6, 1977) is a Mexican football manager and former player.
