= Hugo Castillo (Argentine footballer) =

Argentine footballer and manager

Hugo Norberto Castillo
Personal information
- Full name: Hugo Norberto Castillo Franco
- Date of birth: 7 March 1971 (age 55)
- Place of birth: Capioví, Misiones, Argentina
- Height: 1.73 m (5 ft 8 in)
- Position: Forward

Team information
- Current team: Atlético La Paz (manager)

Senior career*
Years	Team	Apps	(Gls)
1990–1993	Guaraní Antonio Franco		
1993–1996	Deportivo Español	81	(25)
1996–1997	Monterrey	26	(6)
1998–2001	Atlas	97	(48)
2002–2004	América	92	(25)
2004–2006	Santos Laguna	30	(6)
2006–2007	Guaraní Antonio Franco		

Managerial career
- 2009: Sinaloa (Assistant)
- 2009–2010: Guaraní Antonio Franco
- 2014–2015: Atlas U–20
- 2015: Atlas (Interim)
- 2016: Atlas Premier
- 2018: Monterrey Premier
- 2018: Monterrey (women) (Assistant)
- 2018–2021: Monterrey U–20
- 2021–2022: Monterrey (Assistant)
- 2022: Monterrey (Interim)
- 2022–2023: Tritones Vallarta
- 2024–2025: Monterrey U–23
- 2025–: Atlético La Paz
- * Club domestic league appearances and goals

Hugo Norberto Castillo Franco (born March 17, 1971) is an Argentine football manager and former player. He is currently the manager of Liga de Expansión MX club Atlético La Paz.

== Honours ==
América

- Mexican Primera División: Verano 2002

== Managerial statistics ==
As of 31 May 2016

Team	Nat	From	To	Record							
Team	Nat	From	To	G	W	D	L	GF	GA	GD	Win %
Atlas (Interim)	(Mexico)	2015	2015	3	0	0	3	2	6	−4	0.00
Total				3	0	0	3	2	6	−4	0.00
