= Omar Blanco =

American politician

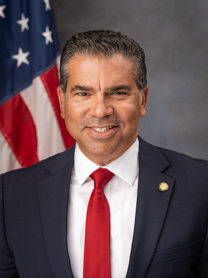

Member of the Florida House of Representatives from the 115th district
- Incumbent
- Assumed office November 5, 2024
- Preceded by: Alina Garcia

Personal details
- Born: March 16 Miami, Florida, U.S.
- Party: Republican
- Spouse: Carolina Blanco
- Children: 2

Omar Blanco (born March 16) is an American politician serving as a Republican member of the Florida House of Representatives for the 115th district. He works as a fire rescue/firefighter captain. He is a Catholic.
