= Alberto Macías =

Mexican footballer (born 1969)

Personal information
- Full name: Alberto Macías Hernández
- Date of birth: 28 December 1969 (age 56)
- Place of birth: Guadalajara, Mexico
- Height: 1.89 m (6 ft 2 in)
- Position: Defender

Senior career*
Years	Team	Apps	(Gls)
1990–2000	Toluca	239	(22)
2000–2001	Cruz Azul	25	(0)
2001	Club América	11	(0)
2002	Club Atlas	26	(1)
2003	Atlante F.C.	16	(1)
2003	Club América	0	(0)
2004	San Luis F.C.	12	(0)

International career
1991–1992	Mexico U23	??	(??)
2000–2001	Mexico	5	(0)
- * Club domestic league appearances and goals as of 19-07-10

Alberto Macías Hernández (born 28 December 1969) is a Mexican former professional footballer who played as a defender.

A tall center back nicknamed "El Flaco," Macías spent most of his career at Toluca after breaking into the team in 1991. He became a starter in 1992 and, after playing infrequently the next three years, returned to the starting lineup in 1996. Playing alongside teammates such as Salvador Carmona under the guidance of coach Enrique Meza, Macías formed a key part of the defensive line that helped Toluca to league titles in the Verano 1998, Verano 1999, and Verano 2000 seasons. He also provided a strong threat in the air, scoring 11 total goals in the three championship campaigns. In 2000, he moved to Cruz Azul, later playing for Club América, Atlas, Atlante, and San Luis. The Clausura 2004 campaign, with San Luis, was the last for Macías in the Mexican top flight.

Macías was a member of the Mexico national football team competing at the 1992 Summer Olympics in Barcelona, Spain, appearing in all three matches. He also earned four caps for the national A-side, making his debut on November 15, 2000, in a World Cup qualifying match against Canada, substituting Ramón Ramírez in the 76th minute. With former Toluca coach Meza at the helm, Macías got an opportunity with the full national team, but the rise of young Rafael Márquez to join veteran Claudio Suárez in central defense made his task difficult. Macías earned his final cap on February 28, 2001, in a 2–0 loss to the United States to begin the final round of qualifiers for the 2002 FIFA World Cup.
