= Darko Vukić =

Croatian footballer

Personal information
- Date of birth: 2 December 1968 (age 57)
- Place of birth: Zagreb, SR Croatia, SFR Yugoslavia
- Height: 1.76 m (5 ft 9 in)
- Position: Midfielder

Senior career*
Years	Team	Apps	(Gls)
1990–1994	NK Zagreb	93	(14)
1994	Nîmes	33	(4)
1995–1997	NK Zagreb	36	(2)
1997	Hapoel Haifa	6	(0)
1997–1999	Deportivo Toluca	48	(7)
1999–2000	Atlético Celaya	15	(1)
2000	Atlético Mexiquense	14	(3)
2000–2001	Real San Luis	15	(2)
2002–2003	NK Zagreb	2	(0)
Total		256	(33)

International career
1994	Croatia	1	(0)
- * Club domestic league appearances and goals

Darko Vukić (born 2 December 1968 in Yugoslavia) is a Croatian former footballer played as a midfielder.

== International career ==
He played once for Croatia, in an April 1994 friendly match away against Slovakia.

== Honours ==
- Mexico Primera Division: Invierno 1998, Verano 1999
