= Antonio Taboada =

Mexican-born Argentine footballer and manager

Personal information
- Full name: Antonio de Jesús Taboada Herrera
- Date of birth: 11 September 1967 (age 59)
- Place of birth: Mexico City, Mexico
- Height: 1.71 m (5 ft 7 in)
- Position: Midfielder

Senior career*
Years	Team	Apps	(Gls)
1990–1996	Cruz Azul	128	(1)
1996–2000	Toluca	131	(4)
2001	Irapuato	26	(0)
2002	Querétaro	17	(1)
Total		302	(6)

International career
1995	Mexico	4	(0)

Managerial career
- 2009: Libertadores de Pénjamo (assistant)
- 2010: Petroleros de Salamanca (assistant)
- 2012: Irapuato (assistant)
- 2015: Atlético San Francisco
- 2015: Irapuato (assistant)
- 2015: Ocelotes UNACH (assistant)
- 2016: Pioneros de Cancún (assistant)
- 2018: Cocodrilos F.C. Lázaro Cárdenas (assistant)
- 2023–2025: Cruz Azul U17
- * Club domestic league appearances and goals

Antonio de Jesús Taboada Herrera (born 11 September 1967), known as Antonio Taboada, is a Mexican football manager and former player. Taboada also earned five caps for the Mexico national team.
