= Enrique Alfaro (footballer) =

Mexican footballer (born 1974)

Personal information
- Full name: Enrique Alfaro Rojas
- Date of birth: 11 December 1974 (age 51)
- Place of birth: Mexico City, Mexico
- Height: 1.74 m (5 ft 8 1/2 in)
- Position: Midfielder

Senior career*
Years	Team	Apps	(Gls)
1994–2002	Toluca	226	(31)

International career
1996–1998	Mexico	20	(2)

Managerial career
- 2007–2010: Toluca Reserves and Academy
- 2016: Tepic (Assistant)
- 2016–2017: Toluca (Assistant)
- 2023: Juárez (Assistant)
Medal record
Representing Mexico
Winner	CONCACAF Gold Cup	1998
- * Club domestic league appearances and goals

Enrique Alfaro (born 11 December 1974) is a Mexican former football midfielder. He spent most of his career with Toluca, playing from 1994 to 2002.

An attacking midfielder who normally lined up on the right side of the midfield line or in a three-forward attack, Alfaro played a key part in Toluca's championship runs during the Verano tournaments of 1998, 1999, and 2000.

Alfaro also had a successful international career. As part of the Under-23 selection, he represented Mexico at the 1996 Summer Olympics in Atlanta, appearing in all four matches. He also collected 20 full caps for Mexico, including five qualifiers for the 1998 FIFA World Cup, and played on Mexico's title-winning squad at the 1998 CONCACAF Gold Cup. A favorite selection at the beginning of the regime of Bora Milutinovic, Alfaro gradually slipped down the pecking order with the emergence of Luis Hernandez and Cuauhtémoc Blanco as the preferred strikers under Milutinovic's successor, Manuel Lapuente. He collected his first cap against Bolivia in a 1–0 win at the Cotton Bowl in Dallas on 8 June 1996, and made his last international appearance on 18 March 1998, in a 1–1 draw with Paraguay.

== Honours ==
Toluca

- Mexican Primera División: Verano 1998, Verano 1999, Verano 2000

Mexico

- CONCACAF Gold Cup: 1998
- CONCACAF Pre-Olympic Tournament: 1996
