= Enrique Meza =

Mexican football manager (born 1948)

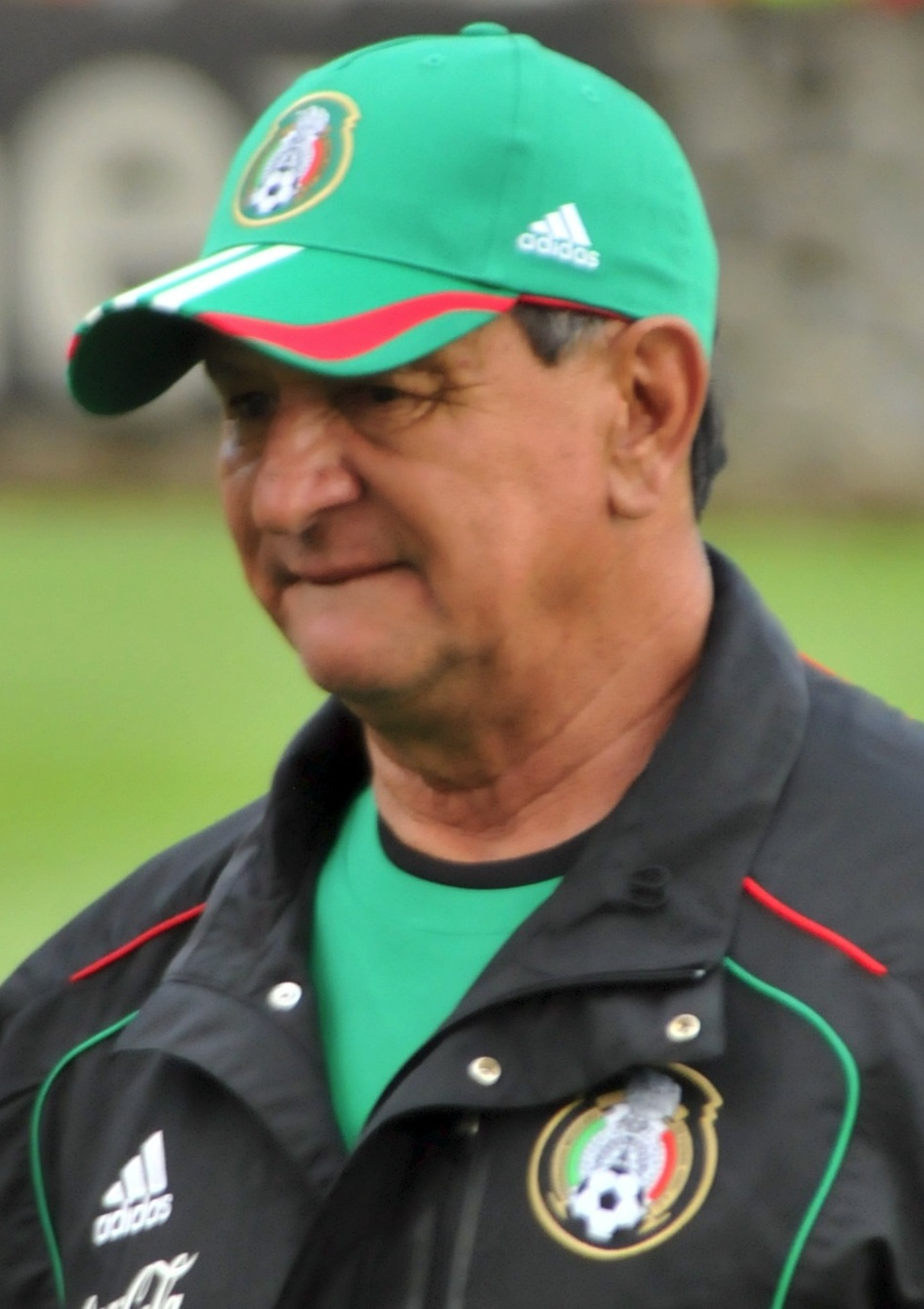
- Meza as Mexico manager in 2010

Personal information
- Full name: Enrique Meza Enríquez
- Date of birth: 3 March 1948 (age 78)
- Place of birth: Mexico City, Mexico
- Height: 1.78 m (5 ft 10 in)
- Position: Goalkeeper

Senior career*
Years	Team	Apps	(Gls)
1967–1975	Cruz Azul		
1975–1977	Tigres UANL		
1980–1981	Cruz Azul		

Managerial career
- 1982–1983: Cruz Azul
- 1992–1995: Cruz Azul
- 1995–1996: Morelia
- 1996–1997: Toros Neza
- 1997–2000: Toluca
- 2000–2001: Mexico
- 2002: Atlas
- 2003: Cruz Azul
- 2005: Toluca
- 2006–2009: Pachuca
- 2009–2012: Cruz Azul
- 2010: Mexico
- 2012–2013: Toluca
- 2013–2014: Pachuca
- 2015–2016: Morelia
- 2017–2019: Puebla
- 2019: Veracruz
- * Club domestic league appearances and goals

Enrique Meza Enríquez (born 3 March 1948) is a Mexican former professional football manager.

Across a career that spanned nearly four decades, Meza led eight different clubs in the country's top division. His most enduring achievements came with Deportivo Toluca, where he secured three Primera División championships and cemented his reputation as one of the league's elite tacticians. At Pachuca, Meza won his fourth league championship, two CONCACAF Champions' Cup titles, and the Copa Sudamericana, becoming the first, and so far only, Mexican coach to win a CONMEBOL competition. His distinguished club career was complemented by two separate appointments as manager of the Mexico national team, where he oversaw 20 international matches.

== Coaching career ==
=== Beginnings ===
Notably, Meza has been coach of several professional soccer teams in Mexico Premier League and Mexico National Team. His career has been filled with impressive successes and disappointments. Meza started his coaching career in the first division Mexico league by coaching Cruz Azul from 1982 to 1983 and from 1992 to 1995. He led Cruz Azul to the Mexico league final in 1994, but lost. The next year he switched to coach Monarcas Morelia.

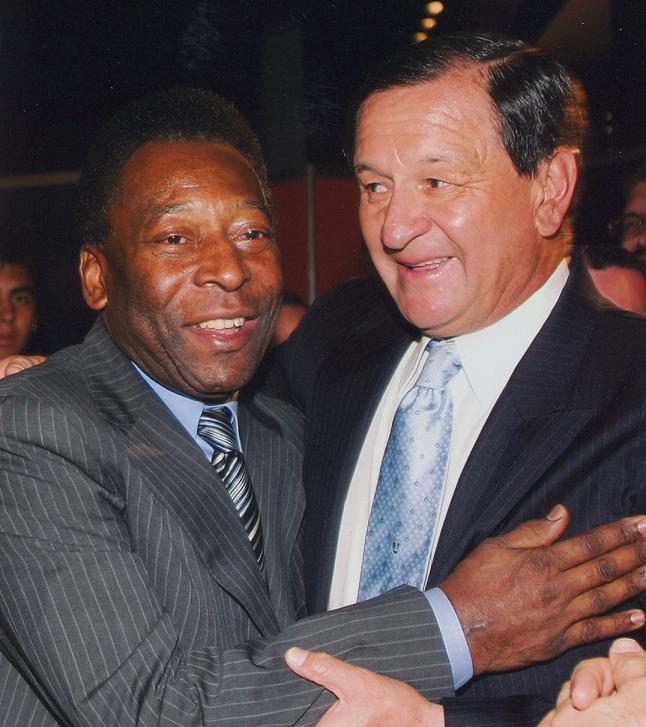
Enrique Meza with Pelé

Crucially, it was not until 1996 that his coaching truly started showing its capturing potential. His new team, Toros Neza, had a distinct style of football offensive play, resulting in their scoring numerous goals. During 1996, his Toros Neza team made it to the final, but lost to Chivas de Guadalajara by a high score.

=== Three times league Champion ===
Soon after losing the final, he announced that he was leaving to coach Club Toluca. His coaching proved to be very successful and spectacular. Meza was what Toluca needed, and the club became champion on three occasions: Verano 1998, Verano 1999 and Verano 2000, in just two years. In 2000 Meza left Club Toluca to coach the Mexico national team. The performance of the team was below expectations, and he resigned after only few months of accepting the appointment. In 2006 Meza took the coaching position at Pachuca Football Club.

=== South American and CONCACAF Titles ===
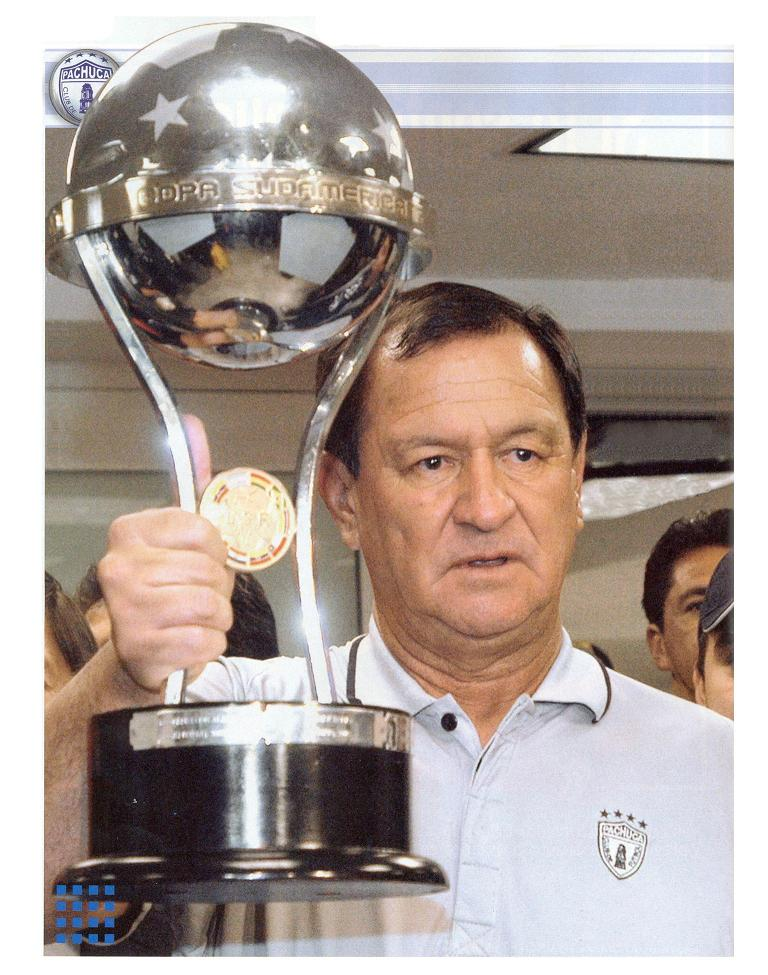
Meza holding the 2006 Copa Sudamericana trophy

After a very bad start, Meza slowly transformed the team, leading Pachuca Football Club to its first Copa Sudamericana championship. This made C.F. Pachuca the first time Mexico won a CONMEBOL title. In 2007 Meza took C.F. Pachuca to their second CONCACAF: Confederation of North, Central American and Caribbean Association Football title, which entitled the team to participate in the 2007 FIFA Club World Cup, and lead C.F. Pachuca to its fifth league title. On 29 August 2007, his team won its first Superliga title, after defeating the Los Angeles Galaxy at the Home Depot Center.

=== FIFA Club World Cup ===
In April, 2008, Pachuca reclaimed the CONCACAF Champions Cup and secured a berth for the Japanese hosted 2008 FIFA Club World Cup held in December 2008. Pachuca finished fourth after winning 1 match with 2 losses. Meza managed Pachuca to a second final in Clausura 2009, but he lost his second final against Ricardo Ferretti of Pumas UNAM (first loss against Guadalajara while coaching Toros Neza) by aggregate score 2–3.

On June 1, 2009, Meza finished his contract with Pachuca; and some members of the media linked Meza to Cruz Azul. Meza's results have made him one of the greatest coaches in the Mexico League, making him the fourth most successful coach in the league's history. Cruz Azul's president, Guillermo Alvarez, Confirmed that Enrique Meza and Cruz Azul had reached an agreement - for what would be his fourth time as coach of Cruz Azul five years later. Enrique Meza returned to Cruz Azul with a new challenge and determination of giving Cruz Azul a title. Since the 1997 Mexico League Winter Tournament Cruz Azul have not won a title.

=== Mexico coach vs World Champions: Spain ===
On July 28, 2010, he was selected as interim coach of the Mexico national team, after Javier Aguirre left the position. He gained new, endearing wide appeal for his only game as interim coach on 11 August 2010 at Mexico's hallowed home of football - Azteca Stadium - because he tactically got a 1–1 draw against the 2008 UEFA European Football Championship and 2010 FIFA World Cup winners Spain.

=== 2012 Mexico Apertura league ===
With the Mexico Clausura - closing - first half of the year football league ending in May 2012, Meza finished his term as head coach and technical director of Cruz Azul on Tuesday 15 May 2012. And on Friday 18 May 2012, Toluca Football Club hired Enrique Meza as their new coach and technical director for the 2012 Apertura - opening - second half of the year Mexico League.

Subsequently, Meza led Toluca to come first in the 2012 Liga MX by points, but lost out to Tijuana in the final championship match of the playoffs involving the premier 8 ranked teams of the League.

=== Return to Pachuca ===
On Tuesday 3 September 2013, in a strategic move, the management of Pachuca Football Club held a press conference and announced that Meza was coming in as new technical director, coach and manager of the distinguished Hidalgo club. Meza took over from Gabriel Caballero who served as coach of Pachuca Football Club from November 2012 to 2 September 2013.

=== Puebla FC ===
Meza was brought in during October 2017 to try to turn around a Puebla FC team that had hit rock bottom of the relegation table. By March 2018, Meza had received praise by the media in regards to his ability to turn around a modest roster into a playoff team.

== Personal life ==
Meza is popularly called "Ojitos" because of his sharp eyes. His son Enrique Maximiliano Meza is also a football manager.

== Managerial statistics ==
=== Managerial statistics ===
As of 4 June 2019 (Note: Includes matches from Liga MX, Copa MX)

Team	Nat	From	To	Record							
Team	Nat	From	To	G	W	D	L	GF	GA	GD	Win %
Morelia	(Mexico)	July 2015	October 2016	64	24	15	25	105	109	−4	37.50
Puebla	(Mexico)	October 2017	February 2019	56	18	14	24	66	82	−16	32.14
Total				120	42	29	49	171	191	−20	35.00

== Titles and honours ==
- League Championships:
  - Verano 1998 Toluca Football Club
  - Verano 1999 Toluca Football Club
  - Verano 2000 Toluca Football Club
  - Clausura 2007 Pachuca Football Club
- CONCACAF Team of the Year:
  - 2007: Pachuca Football Club
- CONCACAF Champions' Cup:
  - 2007 Pachuca Football Club
  - 2008 Pachuca Football Club
- FIFA Club World Cup:
  - Fourth Place: 2008 Pachuca Football Club
- Copa Sudamericana:
  - 2006 Pachuca Football Club

== Picture gallery ==
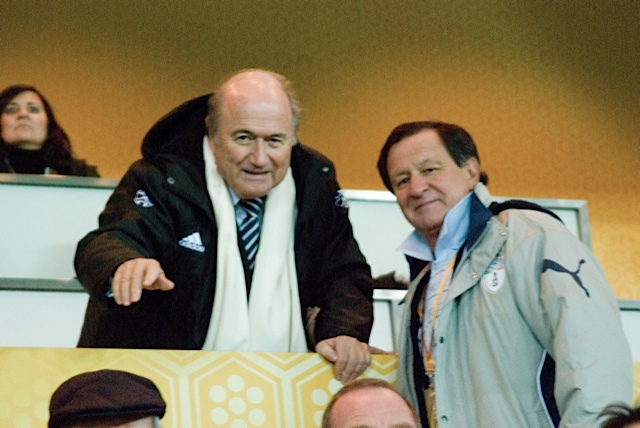
Enrique Meza with FIFA President Sepp Blatter in Japan during the 2008 FIFA Club World Cup

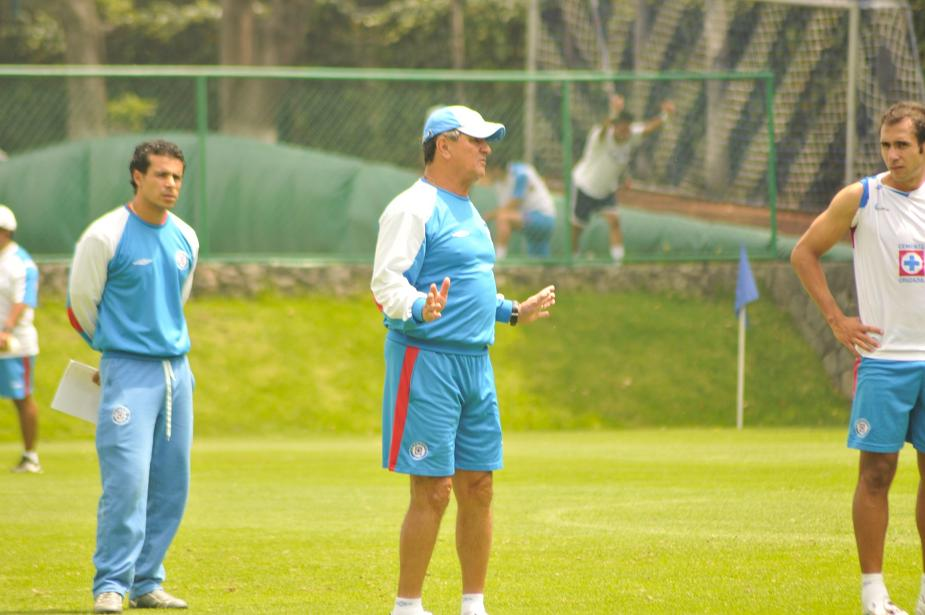
Seen here, in the middle, Meza trains his Cruz Azul team in Mexico City: Mexico

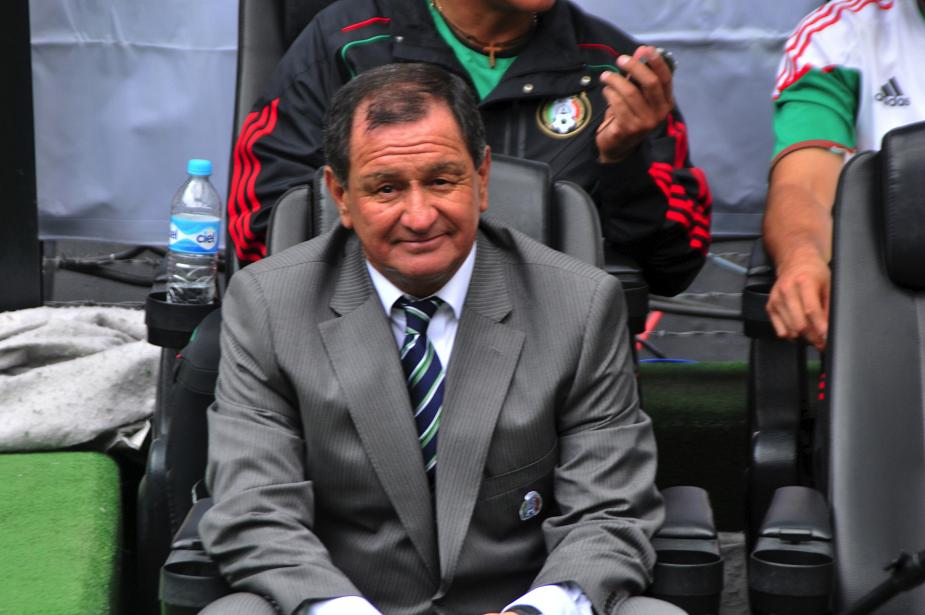
As coach and technical manager of Mexico's national football team during their 11 August 2010 friendly with world champions: Spain

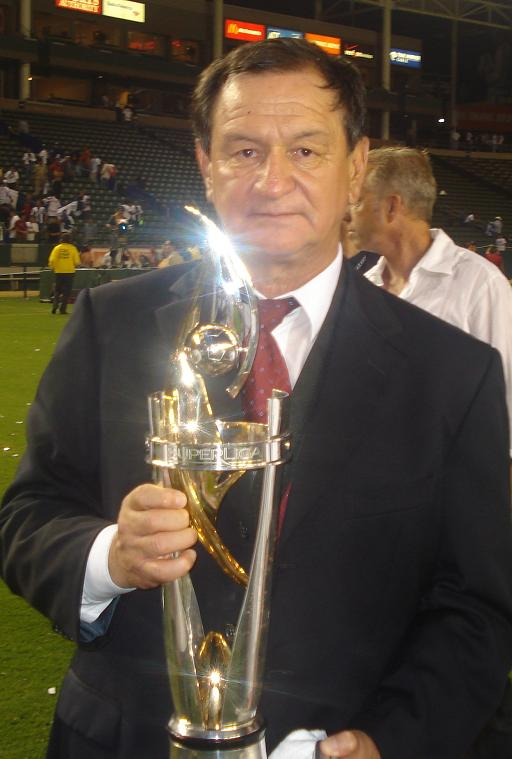
With the 2007 North American SuperLiga Cup his Pachuca team won after defeating Los Angeles Galaxy in the Home Depot Center on 29 August

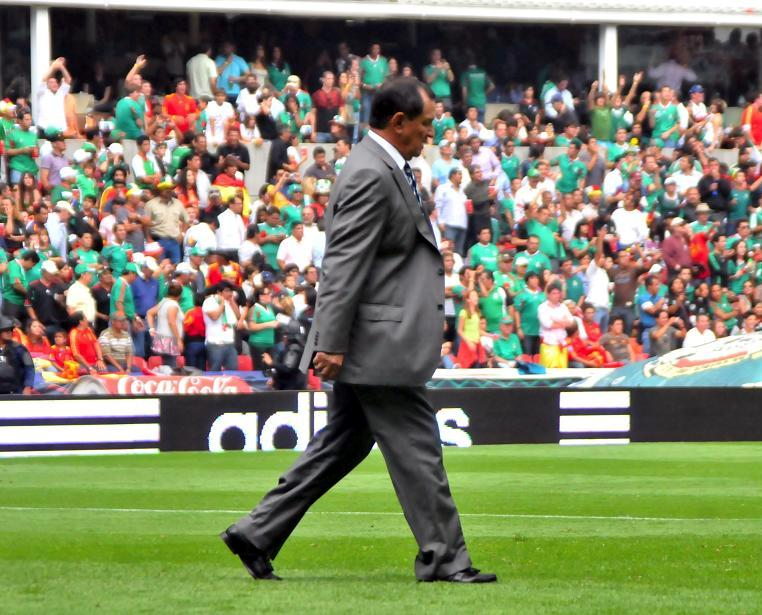
Meza walks off the pitch after he led the Mexico national team to a 1–1 draw with world champions Spain on 11 August 2010 at Azteca Stadium: Mexico City

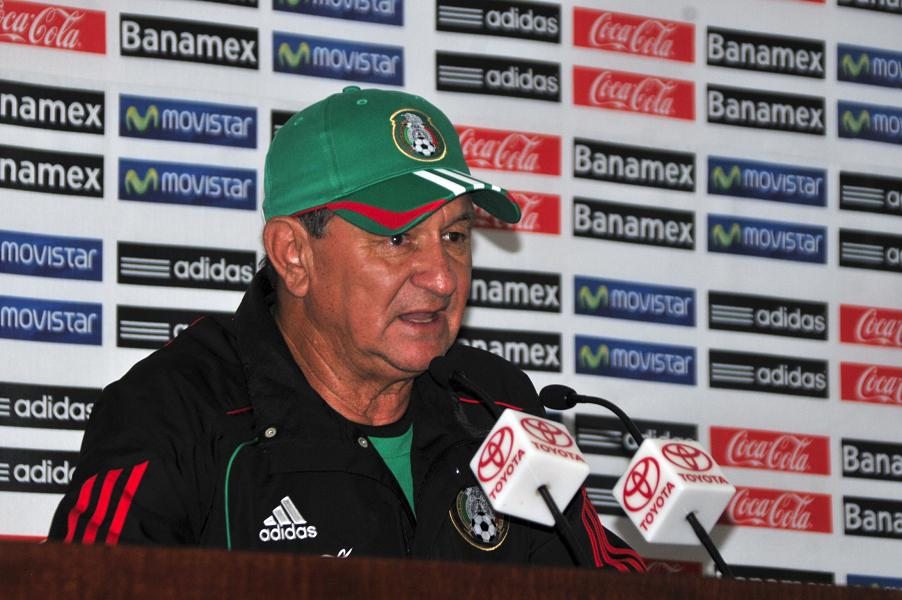
Addressing a global press conference concerning Mexico's friendly game with Spain

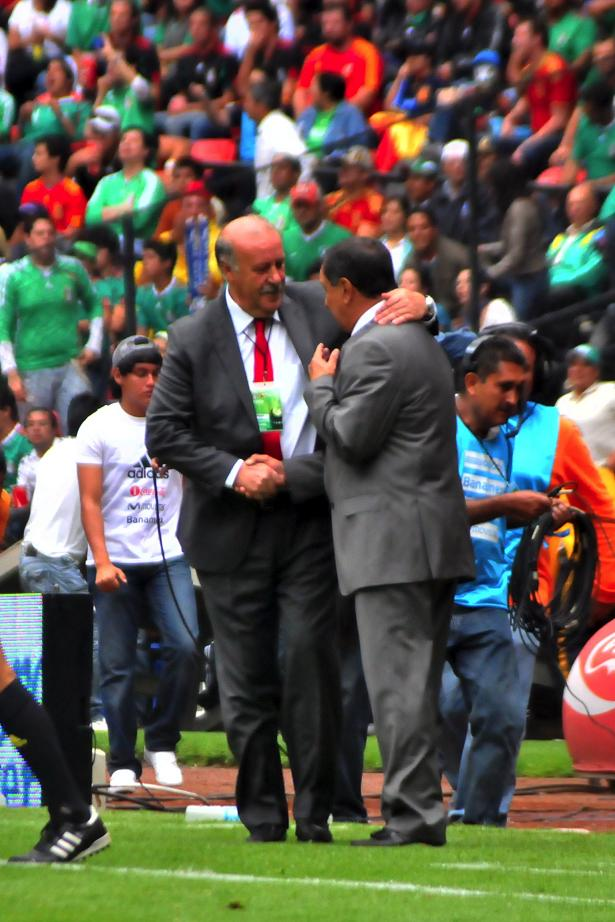
Enrique Meza and Spanish Coach: Vicente del Bosque greeting each other - at Azteca Stadium, Mexico City Mexico during the 11 August 2010 friendly game between Mexico and world champions Spain

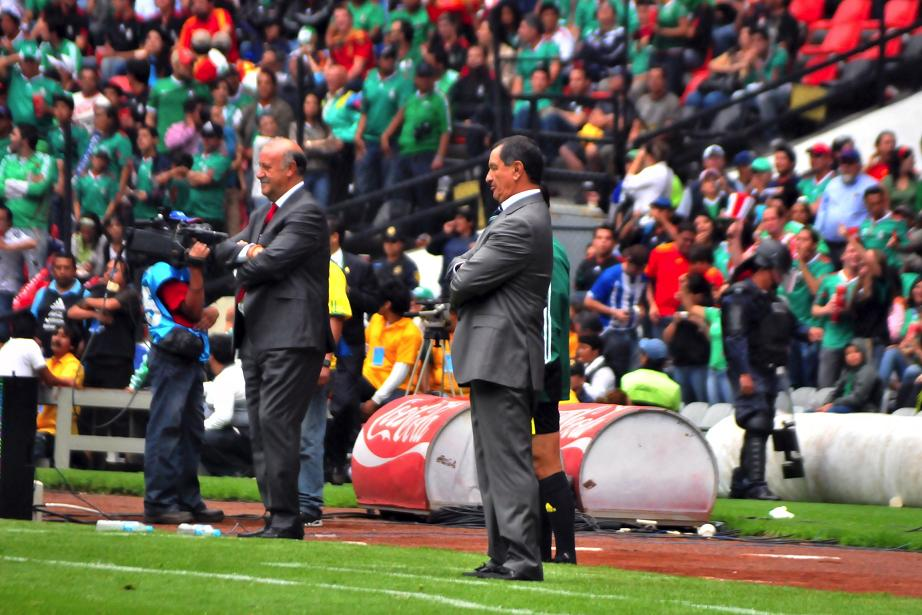
Meza and Vicente

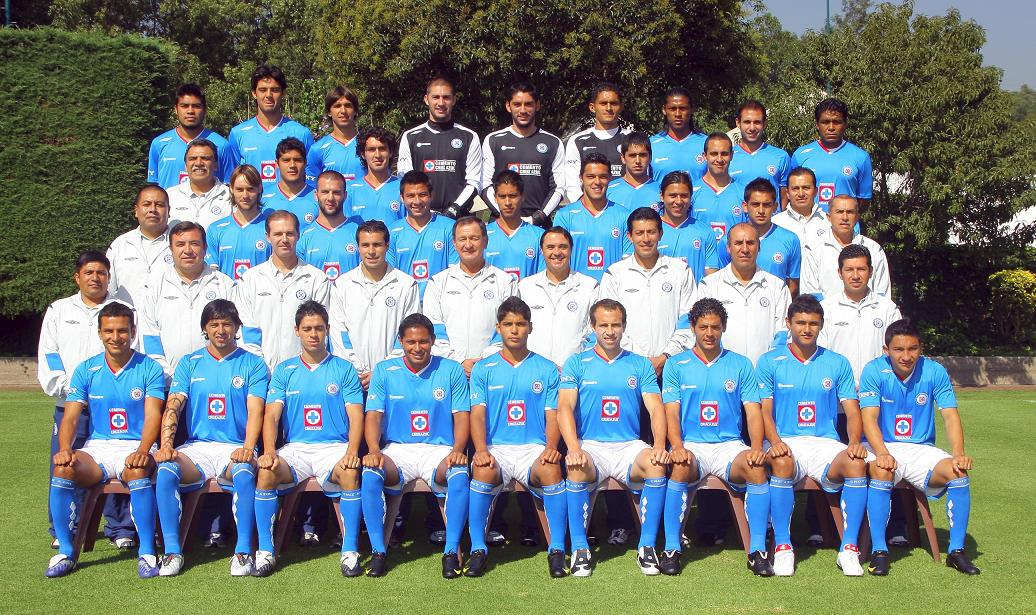
With his complete Cruz Azul team; including medical personnel and assistants

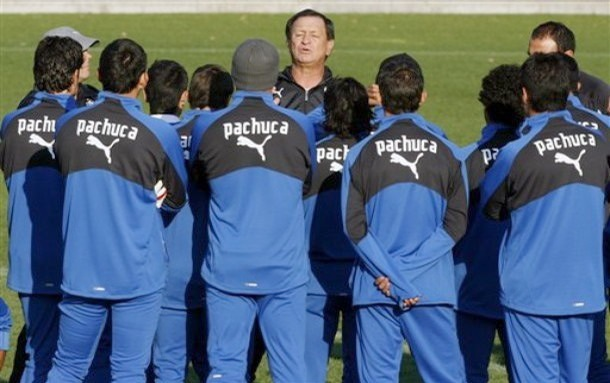
Speaking to his Pachuca football club team

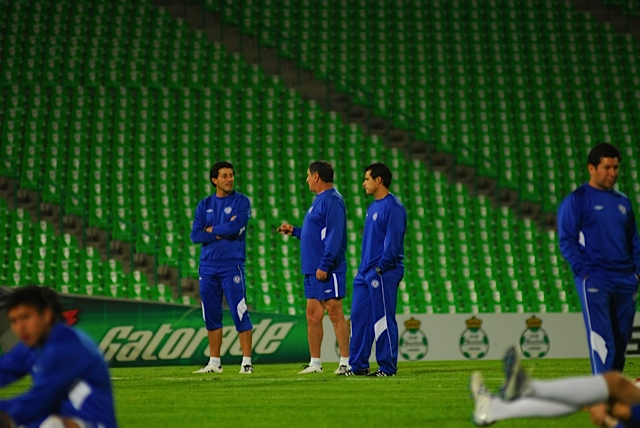
Training session with his Cruz Azul team on an away match at the football Club Santos Laguna Corona Stadium in Torreón, Coahuila, México
