= Primera División de México Verano 2001 =

Primera División de México
- Season: 2000−01
- Champions: Santos Laguna (2nd title)
- Relegated: Atlante
- Champions' Cup: Santos Laguna
- Top goalscorer: Jared Borgetti (18 goals)

Primera División de México (Mexican First Division) Verano 2001 is a Mexican football tournament - one of two short tournaments that take up the entire year to determine the champion(s) of Mexican football. It began on Saturday, January 6, 2001, and ran until April 19, when the regular season ended. In the final Santos Laguna defeated Pachuca and became champions for the second time.

== Clubs ==
Location of the Primera División Invierno 2000 teams

Team	City	Stadium
América	Mexico City	Azteca
Atlante	Mexico City	Azul
Atlas	Guadalajara, Jalisco	Jalisco
Celaya	Celaya, Guanajuato	Miguel Alemán Valdés
Cruz Azul	Mexico City	Azul
Guadalajara	Guadalajara, Jalisco	Jalisco
Irapuato	Irapuato, Guanajuato	Sergio León Chávez
León	León, Guanajuato	Nou Camp
Morelia	Morelia, Michoacán	Morelos
Monterrey	Monterrey, Nuevo León	Tecnológico
Necaxa	Mexico City	Azteca
Pachuca	Pachuca, Hidalgo	Hidalgo
Puebla	Puebla, Puebla	Cuauhtémoc
Santos Laguna	Torreón, Coahuila	Corona
Toluca	Toluca, State of Mexico	Nemesio Díez
UAG	Zapopan, Jalisco	Tres de Marzo
UANL	San Nicolás de los Garza, Nuevo León	Universitario
UNAM	Mexico City	Olímpico Universitario

== Regular phase ==
Group 1
Pos	Team	Pld	W	D	L	GF	GA	GD	Pts	Qualification or relegation
1	Atlante	17	6	5	6	16	16	0	23	Relegated
2	León	17	6	5	6	17	22	−5	23	Directly qualified to the Liguilla (Playoffs)
3	Morelia	17	6	5	6	21	27	−6	23	Qualified for the Repechage
4	Cruz Azul	17	6	4	7	25	27	−2	22	
5	Toluca	17	3	8	6	28	33	−5	17	

Source: MedioTiempo

Group 2
Pos	Team	Pld	W	D	L	GF	GA	GD	Pts	Qualification
1	UANL	17	7	6	4	23	13	+10	27	Directly qualified to the Liguilla (Playoffs)
2	Atlas	17	6	4	7	32	33	−1	22	Qualified for the Repechage
3	UNAM	17	5	7	5	21	24	−3	22	
4	Celaya	17	5	3	9	25	27	−2	18	
5	Irapuato	17	3	4	10	27	38	−11	13	

Source: MedioTiempo

Group 3
Pos	Team	Pld	W	D	L	GF	GA	GD	Pts	Qualification
1	Santos Laguna	17	8	4	5	35	27	+8	28	Directly qualified to the Liguilla (Playoffs)
2	Monterrey	17	7	7	3	25	18	+7	28	Directly qualified to the Liguilla (Playoffs)
3	Puebla	17	7	6	4	21	17	+4	27	Qualified for the Repechage
4	Necaxa	17	5	4	8	20	25	−5	19	

Source: MedioTiempo

Group 4
Pos	Team	Pld	W	D	L	GF	GA	GD	Pts	Qualification
1	América	17	7	7	3	25	15	+10	28	Directly qualified to the Liguilla (Playoffs)
2	Pachuca	17	7	4	6	22	22	0	25	Directly qualified to the Liguilla (Playoffs)
3	UAG	17	7	4	6	24	27	−3	25	Qualified for the Repechage
4	Guadalajara	17	5	7	5	21	17	+4	22	

Source: MedioTiempo

== League table ==
Pos	Team	Pld	W	D	L	GF	GA	GD	Pts	Qualification or relegation
1	América	17	7	7	3	25	15	+10	28	Directly qualified to the Liguilla (Playoffs)
2	Santos Laguna	17	8	4	5	35	27	+8	28	Directly qualified to the Liguilla (Playoffs)
3	Monterrey	17	7	7	3	25	18	+7	28	Directly qualified to the Liguilla (Playoffs)
4	UANL	17	7	6	4	23	13	+10	27	Directly qualified to the Liguilla (Playoffs)
5	Puebla	17	7	6	4	21	17	+4	27	Qualified for the Repechage
6	Pachuca	17	7	4	6	22	22	0	25	Directly qualified to the Liguilla (Playoffs)
7	U.A.G.	17	7	4	6	24	27	−3	25	Qualified for the Repechage
8	Atlante	17	6	5	6	16	16	0	23	Relegated
9	León	17	6	5	6	17	22	−5	23	Directly qualified to the Liguilla (Playoffs)
10	Morelia	17	6	5	6	21	27	−6	23	Qualified for the Repechage
11	Guadalajara	17	5	7	5	21	17	+4	22	
12	Atlas	17	6	4	7	32	33	−1	22	Qualified for the Repechage
13	Cruz Azul	17	6	4	7	25	27	−2	22	
14	UNAM	17	5	7	5	21	24	−3	22	
15	Necaxa	17	5	4	8	20	25	−5	19	
16	Celaya	17	5	3	9	25	27	−2	18	
17	Toluca	17	3	8	6	28	33	−5	17	
18	Irapuato	17	3	4	10	27	38	−11	13	

Source: MedioTiempo

== Results ==
Home \ Away	AME	ATE	ATS	CEL	CAZ	GDL	IRA	LEO	MTY	MOR	NEC	PAC	PUE	SAN	TOL	UAG	UNL	UNM
América	—	3–0	3–0	1–0	0–0	–	2–2	–	–	–	2–1	0–1	–	5–1	–	–	0–0	–
Atlante	–	—	–	2–1	–	0–1	–	1–0	1–1	0–1	–	–	2–0	–	0–1	–	1–1	–
Atlas	–	1–1	—	2–2	–	–	1–0	–	3–3	3–0	2–3	–	–	2–4	4–4	4–1	–	–
Celaya	–	–	–	—	–	3–2	–	4–1	1–3	5–0	–	–	1–0	–	2–1	0–0	1–2	–
Cruz Azul	–	1–1	2–1	2–0	—	–	4–2	1–3	–	–	1–3	–	2–3	4–0	–	–	2–1	–
Guadalajara	1–2	–	2–3	–	2–1	—	–	–	2–0	1–1	–	0–2	–	–	4–0	1–1	–	0–0
Irapuato	–	1–2	–	2–1	–	0–0	—	2–2	–	–	1–0	–	2–2	1–4	–	–	4–1	–
León	1–1	–	1–0	–	–	1–1	–	—	1–1	1–0	–	0–0	–	–	2–0	2–1	–	1–2
Monterrey	3–1	–	–	–	1–1	–	3–2	–	—	2–2	–	2–0	–	–	1–1	1–0	–	3–0
Morelia	2–0	–	–	–	1–0	–	3–2	–	–	—	1–1	1–0	–	3–3	–	2–3	–	2–1
Necaxa	–	1–2	–	1–1	–	1–2	–	0–1	1–0	–	—	–	1–2	1–4	–	–	1–0	–
Pachuca	–	1–0	1–3	1–0	2–3	–	2–0	–	–	–	1–1	—	1–4	2–1	–	–	1–1	–
Puebla	0–0	–	2–0	–	–	0–0	–	1–0	0–0	1–0	–	–	—	–	0–0	2–2	–	1–2
Santos Laguna	–	1–0	–	–	5–2	1–0	–	5–0	0–1	–	–	–	3–1	—	2–2	–	0–0	–
Toluca	1–1	–	–	–	5–1	–	4–2	–	–	2–2	1–2	3–5	–	–	—	1–3	–	2–2
UAG	1–3	0–2	–	–	2–0	–	4–3	–	–	–	0–0	1–0	–	2–0	–	—	–	2–1
UANL	–	–	3–0	–	–	0–0	–	2–0	2–0	2–0	–	–	1–2	–	0–0	5–1	—	2–0
UNAM	1–1	1–1	1–3	2–1	0–0	–	3–1	–	–	–	2–1	2–2	–	1–1	–	–	–	—

Updated to match(es) played on 19 April 2001. Source: RSSSF
Legend: Blue = home team win; Yellow = draw; Red = away team win.

== Top goalscorers ==
Players sorted first by goals scored, then by last name. Only regular season goals listed.

Rank	Player	Club	Goals
1	(Mexico) Jared Borgetti	Santos Laguna	13
2	(Paraguay) José Cardozo	Toluca	11
3	(Mexico) Antonio de Nigris	Monterrey	9
3	(Colombia) Leonardo Fabio Moreno	Celaya	9
3	(Mexico) Daniel Osorno	Atlas	9
3	(Uruguay) Martín Rodríguez	Irapuato	9
3	(Chile) Iván Zamorano	América	9
8	(Argentina) Alejandro Glaría	UNAM	8
8	(Argentina) Diego Latorre	Celaya	8
8	(Uruguay) Carlos María Morales	Toluca	8
8	(Mexico) Juan Pablo Rodríguez	Atlas	8

Source: MedioTiempo

== Final phase (Liguilla) ==
=== Repechage ===
April 25, 2001
20:45

Atlas	1–2	Puebla
Rodríguez 40' (pen.)	Report	Caballero 13'; García Aspe 34'

Estadio Jalisco, Guadalajara
Referee: Antonio Marrufo (Chihuahua)
April 28, 2001
19:00

Puebla	3–3	Atlas
García Aspe 32'; Jiménez 72' (pen.); Capetillo 77'	Report	Caballero 15' (o.g.); Coyette 63'; Zepeda 87'

Estadio Cuauhtémoc, Puebla
Referee: Felipe Ramos Rizo (Mexico City)

Puebla won 5–4 on aggregate.

April 26, 2001
15:00

Morelia	3–3	UAG
Davino 13', 47'; Noriega 55'	Report	Davino 5' (o.g.); Navia 41'; Bautista 67' (pen.)

Estadio Morelos, Morelia
Referee: José Abramo Lira (Nuevo León)
April 29, 2001
17:00

UAG	1–1	Morelia
Bautista 79'	Report	Alex 73'

Estadio Tres de Marzo, Zapopan
Referee: Gilberto Alcalá Pineda (Mexico City)

4–4 on aggregate. UAG advanced for being the higher seeded team.

=== Bracket ===
Quarterfinals
2	Santos Laguna	3	4	7
7	UAG	2	0	2
4	UANL	1	2	3
5	Puebla	3	2	5
1	América	1	4	5
9	León	1	1	2
3	Monterrey	0	2	2
6	Pachuca	4	2	6

Semifinals
2	Santos Laguna (s)	4	2	6
5	Puebla	5	1	6
1	América	0	1	1
6	Pachuca	2	1	3

Finals
2	Santos Laguna	1	3	4
6	Pachuca	2	1	3

=== Quarterfinals ===
May 3, 2001
20:00

UAG	2–3	Santos Laguna
Navia 9'; Palacios 86'	Report	Borgetti 36', 65'; Trujillo 61'

Estadio Tres de Marzo, Zapopan
Referee: Jorge Eduardo Gasso (Mexico City)
May 6, 2001
16:00

Santos Laguna	4–0	UAG
Borgetti 38', 76'; Altamirano 59'; Rodríguez 83'	Report

Estadio Corona, Torreón
Referee: Gilberto Alcalá Pineda (Mexico City)

Santos Laguna won 7–2 on aggregate.

May 2, 2001
20:00

Puebla	3–1	UANL
Zárate 67'; García Aspe 72'; Caballero 82'	Report	Vázquez 32'

Estadio Cuauhtémoc, Puebla
Referee: Antonio Marrufo (Chihuahua)
May 5, 2001
21:00

UANL	2–2	Puebla
Olalde 57'; Mascorro 86' (o.g.)	Report	Ruiz Esparza 48'; Capetillo 54'

Estadio Universitario, San Nicolás de los Garza
Referee: Felipe Ramos Rizo (Mexico City)

Puebla won 5–3 on aggregate.

May 2, 2001
19:00

León	1–1	América
Uribe 8'	Report	Murguía 88' (o.g.)

Estadio León, León
Referee: Marco Antonio Rodríguez (Mexico City)
May 5, 2001
19:15

América	4–1	León
Zamorano 31', 61' (pen.); Oviedo 51', 69'	Report	Mercado 77' (pen.)

Estadio Azteca, Mexico City
Referee: Armando Archundia (Estado de México)

América won 5–2 on aggregate.

May 2, 2001
21:00

Pachuca	4–0	Monterrey
Victorino 34'; Vidrio 66', 70'; Morales 90'	Report

Estadio Hidalgo, Pachuca
Referee: Germán Arredondo Ramírez (Guanajuato)
May 5, 2001
17:00

Monterrey	2–2	Pachuca
de Nigris 32'; Avilán 61'	Report	Victorino 52', 61'

Estadio Tecnológico, Monterrey
Referee: Eduardo Brizio Carter (Mexico City)

Pachuca won 6–2 on aggregate.

=== Semifinals ===
May 10, 2001
20:00

Puebla	5–4	Santos Laguna
Caballero 2'; Claudinho 4', 51'; García Aspe 57' (pen.), 87'	Report	Borgetti 21', 24', 59'; Altamirano 37'

Estadio Cuauhtémoc, Puebla
Referee: Eduardo Brizio Carter (Mexico City)
May 13, 2001
16:00

Santos Laguna	2–1	Puebla
Ruiz 13'; Rodríguez 45'	Report	Claudinho 42'

Estadio Corona, Torreón
Referee: Felipe Ramos Rizo (Mexico City)

6–6 on aggregate. Santos Laguna advanced for being the higher seeded team.

May 9, 2001
20:00

Pachuca	2–0	América
Chitiva 33'; Santana 79'	Report

Estadio Hidalgo, Pachuca
Referee: Armando Archundia (Estado de México)
May 12, 2001
19:15

América	1–1	Pachuca
Luna 5'	Report	Victorino 90'

Estadio Azteca, Mexico City
Referee: Gilberto Alcalá Pineda (Mexico City)

Pachuca won 3–1 on aggregate.

=== Finals ===
May 17, 2001
20:00

Pachuca	2–1	Santos Laguna
Santana 4'; Pineda 85' (pen.)	Report	Borgetti 5'

Estadio Hidalgo, Pachuca
Referee: Felipe Ramos Rizo (Mexico City)

First leg

Pachuca:
GK	1	(Colombia) Miguel Calero	(yellow card) 67'
DF	2	(Mexico) Alberto Rodríguez
DF	5	(Mexico) Francisco Gabriel de Anda
DF	99	(Mexico) Manuel Vidrio
MF	7	(Mexico) Octavio Valdez
MF	6	(Mexico) Alfonso Sosa	(yellow card) 61'
MF	8	(Argentina) Gabriel Caballero
MF	10	(Mexico) Marco Garcés		(substituted off) 59'
MF	21	(Mexico) Cesáreo Victorino
MF	15	(Colombia) Andrés Chitiva	(yellow card) 73'
FW	18	(Mexico) Sergio Santana		(substituted off) 88'
Substitutions:
FW	11	(Mexico) Pedro Pineda		(substituted on) 58'
MF	27	(Mexico) Omar Arellano		(substituted on) 88'
Manager:
(Mexico) Javier Aguirre

Santos Laguna:
GK	1	(Mexico) Adrián Martínez	(yellow card) 72'
DF	21	(Mexico) Héctor Altamirano	(yellow card) 42'
DF	2	(Mexico) Héctor López
DF	3	(Mexico) Jorge Campos
DF	99	(Mexico) Miguel Carreón
MF	22	(Mexico) Carlos Cariño
MF	18	(Mexico) Johan Rodríguez
MF	19	(Mexico) Mariano Trujillo		(substituted off) 81'
MF	11	(Chile) Rodrigo Ruiz
MF	17	(Mexico) Joaquín Reyes		(substituted off) 88'
FW	58	(Mexico) Jared Borgetti
Substitutions:
MF	8	(Brazil) Carlos Augusto Gomes		(substituted on) 81'
MF	7	(Brazil) Róbson Luís		(substituted on) 88'
Manager:
(Mexico) Fernando Quirarte

Second leg

May 20, 2001
16:00

Santos Laguna	3–1	Pachuca
Borgetti 25'; Trujillo 64'; Róbson 79'	Report	Chitiva 38'

Estadio Corona, Torreón
Referee: Gilberto Alcalá Pineda (Mexico City)

Santos Laguna won 4–3 on aggregate.

Santos Laguna:
GK	1	(Mexico) Adrián Martínez
DF	21	(Mexico) Héctor Altamirano		(substituted off) 50'
DF	2	(Mexico) Héctor López		(substituted off) 76'
DF	5	(Paraguay) Luis Romero
DF	99	(Mexico) Miguel Carreón
MF	22	(Mexico) Carlos Cariño
MF	18	(Mexico) Johan Rodríguez	(yellow card) 37'
MF	19	(Mexico) Mariano Trujillo
MF	11	(Chile) Rodrigo Ruiz	(yellow card) 33'
MF	17	(Mexico) Joaquín Reyes		(substituted off) 58'
FW	58	(Mexico) Jared Borgetti
Substitutions:
MF	7	(Brazil) Róbson Luís		(substituted on) 50'
MF	8	(Brazil) Carlos Augusto Gomes		(substituted on) 58'
MF	3	(Mexico) Jorge Campos		(substituted on) 76'
Manager:
(Mexico) Fernando Quirarte

Pachuca:
GK	1	(Colombia) Miguel Calero
DF	2	(Mexico) Alberto Rodríguez
DF	5	(Mexico) Francisco Gabriel de Anda	(yellow card) 37'
DF	99	(Mexico) Manuel Vidrio	(yellow card) 45'
MF	7	(Mexico) Octavio Valdez
MF	6	(Mexico) Alfonso Sosa
MF	8	(Argentina) Gabriel Caballero
MF	10	(Mexico) Marco Garcés		(substituted off) 67'
MF	21	(Mexico) Cesáreo Victorino	(yellow card) 41'
MF	15	(Colombia) Andrés Chitiva		(substituted off) 78'
FW	18	(Mexico) Sergio Santana
Substitutions:
FW	11	(Mexico) Pedro Pineda		(substituted on) 67'
MF	27	(Mexico) Omar Arellano		(substituted on) 78' (substituted off) 83'
FW	9	(Paraguay) Francisco Ferreira		(substituted on) 83'
Manager:
(Mexico) Javier Aguirre

Champions

2nd title

== Relegation ==
Pos.	Team	Pts.	Pld.	Ave.
14.	Celaya	115	102	1.1274
15.	Irapuato	38	34	1.1176
16.	Puebla	109	102	1.0686
17.	León	106	102	1.0392
18.	Atlante	104	102	1.0196

=== Relegation playoff ===
Because the Mexican soccer federation determined the expansion of the league from 18 to 20 teams in two seasons, Atlante, the relegated team, was offered the possibility of playing a promotion of relegation against Veracruz, best team in the Primera División 'A' season table, Atlante was required to pay a bail of 5 million dollars for the celebration of the games, however, this was never paid. Atlante won the playoff.

June 6, 2001
20:30

Veracruz	0–0	Atlante
	Report

Estadio Luis "Pirata" Fuente, Veracruz
June 9, 2001
13:00

Atlante	4–1	Veracruz
Serafín 16'; Sol 29'; Abundis 57', 61'	Report	Hernández 50'

Estadio Azul, Mexico City

Atlante won 4-1 on aggregate.
