= Primera División de México Verano 2000 =

Primera División
- Season: 1999–2000
- Champions: Toluca (6th title)
- Relegated: Neza
- Champions' Cup: Toluca
- Top goalscorer: Sebastián Abreu; Everaldo Begines; Agustín Delgado (14 goals)

Primera División de México (Mexican First Division) Verano 2000 is a Mexican football tournament - one of two short tournaments that take up the entire year to determine the champion(s) of Mexican football. It began on Saturday, January 15, 2000, and ran until May 8, when the regular season ended. In the final Toluca defeated Santos Laguna and became champions for the sixth time.

== Clubs ==
Location of the Primera División Verano 2000 teams

Team	City	Stadium
América	Mexico City	Azteca
Atlante	Mexico City	Azteca
Atlas	Guadalajara, Jalisco	Jalisco
Celaya	Celaya, Guanajuato	Miguel Alemán Valdés
Cruz Azul	Mexico City	Azul
Guadalajara	Guadalajara, Jalisco	Jalisco
León	León, Guanajuato	León
Morelia	Morelia, Michoacán	Morelos
Monterrey	Monterrey, Nuevo León	Tecnológico
Necaxa	Mexico City	Azteca
Pachuca	Pachuca, Hidalgo	Hidalgo
Puebla	Puebla, Puebla	Cuauhtémoc
Santos Laguna	Torreón, Coahuila	Corona
Toluca	Toluca, State of Mexico	Nemesio Díez
Toros Neza	Nezahualcóyotl, State of Mexico	Neza 86
UAG	Zapopan, Jalisco	Tres de Marzo
UANL	San Nicolás de los Garza, Nuevo León	Universitario
UNAM	Mexico City	Olímpico Universitario

== Regular phase ==
Group 1
Pos	Team	Pld	W	D	L	GF	GA	GD	Pts	Qualification
1	Toluca	17	13	1	3	44	28	+16	40	Directly qualified to the Liguilla (Playoffs)
2	UNAM	17	8	4	5	29	22	+7	28	Directly qualified to the Liguilla (Playoffs)
3	Toros Neza	17	6	2	9	25	37	−12	20	
4	UAG	17	6	1	10	22	33	−11	19	
5	León	17	3	6	8	23	30	−7	15	

Source: MedioTiempo

Group 2
Pos	Team	Pld	W	D	L	GF	GA	GD	Pts	Qualification
1	Morelia	17	5	9	3	28	21	+7	24	Directly qualified to the Liguilla (Playoffs)
2	Puebla	17	6	6	5	30	28	+2	24	Directly qualified to the Liguilla (Playoffs)
3	Cruz Azul	17	6	3	8	38	33	+5	21	
4	Monterrey	17	5	6	6	20	31	−11	21	
5	Celaya	17	4	7	6	23	28	−5	19	

Source: MedioTiempo

Group 3
Pos	Team	Pld	W	D	L	GF	GA	GD	Pts	Qualification
1	Santos Laguna	17	8	7	2	31	22	+9	31	Directly qualified to the Liguilla (Playoffs)
2	Atlas	17	7	5	5	32	29	+3	26	Directly qualified to the Liguilla (Playoffs)
3	América	17	6	5	6	36	31	+5	23	
4	Atlante	17	2	5	10	16	34	−18	11	

Source: MedioTiempo

Group 4
Pos	Team	Pld	W	D	L	GF	GA	GD	Pts	Qualification
1	Guadalajara	17	7	6	4	25	17	+8	27	Directly qualified to the Liguilla (Playoffs)
2	Necaxa	17	6	7	4	27	21	+6	25	Directly qualified to the Liguilla (Playoffs)
3	UANL	17	5	7	5	25	22	+3	22	
4	Pachuca	17	4	5	8	18	25	−7	17	

Source: MedioTiempo

== League table ==
Pos	Team	Pld	W	D	L	GF	GA	GD	Pts	Qualification
1	Toluca	17	13	1	3	44	28	+16	40	Directly qualified to the Liguilla (Playoffs)
2	Santos Laguna	17	8	7	2	31	22	+9	31	Directly qualified to the Liguilla (Playoffs)
3	UNAM	17	8	4	5	29	22	+7	28	Directly qualified to the Liguilla (Playoffs)
4	Guadalajara	17	7	6	4	25	17	+8	27	Directly qualified to the Liguilla (Playoffs)
5	Atlas	17	7	5	5	32	29	+3	26	Directly qualified to the Liguilla (Playoffs)
6	Necaxa	17	6	7	4	27	21	+6	25	Directly qualified to the Liguilla (Playoffs)
7	Morelia	17	5	9	3	28	21	+7	24	Directly qualified to the Liguilla (Playoffs)
8	Puebla	17	6	6	5	30	28	+2	24	Directly qualified to the Liguilla (Playoffs)
9	América	17	6	5	6	36	31	+5	23	
10	UANL	17	5	7	5	25	22	+3	22	
11	Cruz Azul	17	6	3	8	38	33	+5	21	
12	Monterrey	17	5	6	6	20	31	−11	21	
13	Toros Neza	17	6	2	9	25	37	−12	20	
14	Celaya	17	4	7	6	23	28	−5	19	
15	UAG	17	6	1	10	22	33	−11	19	
16	Pachuca	17	4	5	8	18	25	−7	17	
17	León	17	3	6	8	23	30	−7	15	
18	Atlante	17	2	5	10	16	34	−18	11	

Source: MedioTiempo

== Results ==
Home \ Away	AME	ATE	ATS	CEL	CAZ	GDL	LEO	MTY	MOR	NEC	PAC	PUE	SAN	TOL	TRN	UAG	UNL	UNM
América	—	1–1	4–1	–	–	–	4–2	1–1	–	–	0–0	–	6–1	–	–	–	2–2	–
Atlante	–	—	–	1–1	–	0–1	–	1–1	–	–	2–1	–	1–2	–	3–2	–	0–1	0–1
Atlas	–	3–1	—	–	–	–	2–0	1–0	–	–	3–1	–	2–2	–	6–1	–	0–4	0–0
Celaya	3–1	–	2–2	—	1–0	1–1	–	–	1–1	–	–	2–1	–	2–3	–	3–2	–	–
Cruz Azul	2–3	2–2	1–1	–	—	–	6–3	4–0	1–1	0–3	–	3–1	–	–	–	5–1	–	–
Guadalajara	3–0	–	1–3	–	3–4	—	1–0	–	4–1	–	–	1–1	–	1–1	–	4–0	–	–
León	–	2–2	–	4–1	–	–	—	4–0	–	–	2–1	–	2–2	–	1–2	–	0–0	1–1
Monterrey	–	–	–	2–2	–	1–1	–	—	–	1–0	2–1	–	0–0	6–2	0–3	–	0–0	3–2
Morelia	2–0	3–1	0–0	–	–	–	0–0	5–0	—	0–0	1–1	0–0	0–0	–	–	–	–	–
Necaxa	2–0	4–0	3–2	1–1	–	0–0	1–1	–	–	—	–	2–2	–	–	2–1	–	1–1	–
Pachuca	–	–	–	2–0	3–2	2–0	–	–	–	0–4	—	–	1–1	2–4	0–1	–	1–0	2–2
Puebla	2–2	4–0	5–2	–	–	–	2–1	4–2	–	–	0–0	—	3–1	–	–	–	–	1–3
Santos Laguna	–	–	–	1–0	3–1	2–0	–	–	–	2–2	–	–	—	4–2	2–2	2–0	5–0	1–0
Toluca	2–4	2–0	2–1	–	3–2	–	3–0	–	2–1	3–1	–	5–0	–	—	–	1–0	–	–
Toros Neza	0–5	–	–	4–3	1–0	1–3	–	–	1–3	–	–	1–0	–	0–1	—	1–2	–	–
UAG	3–2	3–1	0–1	–	–	–	2–0	0–1	1–3	4–1	1–0	1–1	–	–	–	—	–	–
UANL	–	–	–	0–0	3–2	0–1	–	–	3–3	–	–	0–1	–	1–2	3–3	5–1	—	–
UNAM	4–1	–	–	2–0	1–3	0–0	–	–	2–0	3–0	–	–	–	3–6	3–1	2–1	0–2	—

Updated to match(es) played on 8 May 2000. Source: RSSSF
Legend: Blue = home team win; Yellow = draw; Red = away team win.

== Top goalscorers ==
Players sorted first by goals scored, then by last name. Only regular season goals listed.

Rank	Player	Club	Goals
1	(Uruguay) Sebastián Abreu	UAG	14
1	(Mexico) Everaldo Begines	León	14
1	(Ecuador) Agustín Delgado	Necaxa	14
4	(Mexico) Luis Hernández	UANL	13
5	(Paraguay) José Cardozo	Toluca	12
5	(Mexico) Francisco Palencia	Cruz Azul	12
7	(Mexico) Jared Borgetti	Santos Laguna	10
7	(Uruguay) Carlos María Morales	Toluca	10
9	(Mexico) Cuauhtémoc Blanco	América	9
9	(Mexico) Jesús Olalde	UNAM	9

Source: MedioTiempo

== Final phase (Liguilla) ==
=== Bracket ===
Quarterfinals
1	Toluca	2	7	9
8	Puebla	0	0	0
4	Guadalajara (s)	1	1	2
5	Atlas	1	1	2
2	Santos Laguna (s)	3	0	3
7	Morelia	2	1	3
3	UNAM	4	2	6
6	Necaxa	3	1	4

Semifinals
1	Toluca	4	2	6
4	Guadalajara	1	2	3
2	Santos Laguna	1	1	2
3	UNAM	1	0	1

Finals
1	Toluca	2	5	7
2	Santos Laguna	0	1	1

=== Quarterfinals ===
May 17, 2000
19:00

Puebla	0–2	Toluca
	Report	Morales 48', 72'

Estadio Cuauhtémoc, Puebla
Referee: Germán Arredondo Ramírez (Guanajuato)
May 20, 2000
15:00

Toluca	7–0	Puebla
Morales 36', 63', 84'; Cardozo 48', 50', 74'; Ruíz 90'	Report

Estadio Nemesio Díez, Toluca
Referee: Eduardo Brizio Carter (Mexico City)

Toluca won 9–0 on aggregate.

May 14, 2000
18:00

Atlas	1–1	Guadalajara
Rodríguez 44' (pen.)	Report	Ruiz 89'

Estadio Jalisco, Guadalajara
Referee: Gilberto Alcalá Pineda (Mexico City)
May 21, 2000
19:00

Guadalajara	1–1	Atlas
Ruiz 77'	Report	Castillo 60'

Estadio Jalisco, Guadalajara
Referee: Felipe Ramos Rizo (Mexico City)

2–2 on aggregate. Guadalajara advanced for being the higher seeded team.

May 18, 2000
15:00

Morelia	2–3	Santos Laguna
García 9'; Alex 67'	Report	Borgetti 65', 90'; Romero 75'

Estadio Morelos, Morelia
Referee: Marco Antonio Rodríguez (Mexico City)
May 21, 2000
16:00

Santos Laguna	0–1	Morelia
	Report	H. Morales 31'

Estadio Corona, Torreón
Referee: Edgar Ulises Rangel (Estado de México)

3–3 on aggregate. Santos Laguna advanced for being the higher seeded team.

May 18, 2000
21:00

Necaxa	3–4	UNAM
Cabrera 3'; Almaguer 8'; Pérez 57'	Report	González 7', 39'; Ramírez 23'; Olalde 30'

Estadio Azteca, Mexico City
Referee: Armando Archundia (Estado de México)
May 21, 2000
12:00

UNAM	2–1	Necaxa
Olalde 65', 85'	Report	Aguinaga 9'

Estadio Olímpico Universitario, Mexico City
Referee: Antonio Marrufo (Chihuahua)

UNAM won 6–4 on aggregate.

=== Semifinals ===
May 24, 2000
20:00

Guadalajara	1–4	Toluca
Mendoza 38'	Report	Cardozo 10', 54'; Morales 26'; Ruíz 47'

Estadio Jalisco, Guadalajara
Referee: Armando Archundia (Estado de México)
May 27, 2000
15:00

Toluca	2–2	Guadalajara
Cardozo 12'; Ruíz 32'	Report	Morales 42'; Galindo 83'

Estadio Nemesio Díez, Toluca
Referee: Edgar Ulises Rangel (Estado de México)

Toluca won 6–3 on aggregate.

May 25, 2000
20:00

UNAM	1–1	Santos Laguna
Olalde 8'	Report	López 48'

Estadio Olímpico Universitario, Mexico City
Referee: Germán Arredondo Ramírez (Guanajuato)
May 28, 2000
16:00

Santos Laguna	1–0	UNAM
Borgetti 83'	Report

Estadio Corona, Torreón
Referee: Felipe Ramos Rizo (Mexico City)

Santos won 2–1 on aggregate.

=== Finals ===
May 31, 2000
16:00

Santos Laguna	0–2	Toluca
	Report	Ruiz 23'; Morales 53'

Estadio Corona, Torreón
Referee: Germán Arredondo Ramírez (Guanajuato)

First leg

Santos Laguna:
GK	1	(Mexico) Adrián Martínez
DF	21	(Mexico) Héctor Altamirano
DF	2	(Mexico) Héctor López
DF	5	(Paraguay) Luis Romero	(yellow card) 55'
DF	3	(Mexico) Jorge Alberto Campos		(substituted off) 44'
MF	99	(Mexico) Miguel Carreón		(substituted off) 46'
MF	6	(Mexico) Miguel España (c)	(yellow card) 78'
MF	18	(Mexico) Johan Rodríguez	(yellow card) 45'
MF	8	(Brazil) Carlos Augusto Gomes		(substituted off) 69'
FW	58	(Mexico) Jared Borgetti
FW	20	(Mexico) Héctor Hernández		(substituted off) 57'
Substitutions:
FW	13	(Mexico) Edson Alvarado		(substituted on) 46'
MF	10	(Paraguay) Hugo Ovelar		(substituted on) 57'
FW	7	(Argentina) Martín Boasso		(substituted on) 69'
Manager:
(Mexico) Fernando Quirarte

Toluca:
GK	1	(Argentina) Hernán Cristante
DF	4	(Mexico) Salvador Carmona	(yellow card) 87'
DF	5	(Mexico) Omar Blanco
DF	13	(Mexico) Alberto Macías
DF	19	(Mexico) Adrian García Arias
MF	27	(Mexico) Enrique Alfaro	(yellow card) 45'	(substituted off) 55'
MF	7	(Mexico) Víctor Ruiz
MF	18	(Mexico) David Rangel (c)	(yellow card) 65'
MF	11	(Brazil) Manoel Ferreira		(substituted off) 73'
FW	9	(Paraguay) José Cardozo
FW	15	(Uruguay) Carlos María Morales		(substituted off) 62'
Substitutions:
MF	14	(Mexico) Manuel Martínez		(substituted on) 55'
FW	23	(Mexico) José Manuel Abundis		(substituted on) 62'
DF	6	(Mexico) Antonio Taboada		(substituted on) 73'
Manager:
(Mexico) Enrique Meza

June 3, 2000
15:00

Toluca	5–1	Santos Laguna
Morales 16'; Cardozo 61', 77'; García 85'; Martínez 89'	Report	Romero 32'

Estadio Toluca 70-86, Toluca
Referee: Felipe Ramos Rizo (Mexico City)

Toluca won 7–1 on aggregate.

Second leg

Toluca:
GK	1	(Argentina) Hernán Cristante
DF	4	(Mexico) Salvador Carmona
DF	5	(Mexico) Omar Blanco
DF	13	(Mexico) Alberto Macías
DF	19	(Mexico) Adrian García Arias
MF	27	(Mexico) Enrique Alfaro	(substituted off) 71'
MF	18	(Mexico) David Rangel (c)
MF	7	(Mexico) Víctor Ruiz
MF	11	(Brazil) Manoel Ferreira	(substituted off) 74'
FW	9	(Paraguay) José Cardozo
FW	15	(Uruguay) Carlos María Morales	(substituted off) 82'
Substitutions:
MF	14	(Mexico) Manuel Martínez	(substituted on) 71'
FW	23	(Mexico) José Manuel Abundis	(substituted on) 74'
MF	8	(Mexico) Rafael García	(substituted on) 82'
Manager:
(Mexico) Enrique Meza

Santos Laguna:
GK	1	(Mexico) Adrián Martínez
DF	21	(Mexico) Héctor Altamirano	(yellow card) 35' (yellow-red card) 35'
DF	2	(Mexico) Héctor López	(yellow card) 34'
DF	5	(Paraguay) Luis Romero
DF	3	(Mexico) Jorge Alberto Campos
MF	99	(Mexico) Miguel Carreón
MF	6	(Mexico) Miguel España (c)		(substituted off) 58'
MF	18	(Mexico) Johan Rodríguez	(yellow card) 30'
MF	8	(Brazil) Carlos Augusto Gomes		(substituted off) 46'
MF	10	(Paraguay) Hugo Ovelar		(substituted off) 69'
FW	58	(Mexico) Jared Borgetti
Substitutions:
FW	13	(Mexico) Edson Alvarado	(substituted on) 46'
FW	20	(Mexico) Héctor Hernández	(substituted on) 58'
FW	7	(Argentina) Martín Boasso	(substituted on) 69'
Manager:
(Mexico) Fernando Quirarte

Champions

6th title

== Relegation ==
Pos.	Team	Pts.	Pld.	Ave.
14.	Celaya	119	102	1.1666
15.	Atlante	117	102	1.1470
16.	León	114	102	1.1176
17.	Monterrey	114	102	1.1176
18.	Toros Neza	105	102	1.0294
