= 1994–95 Atlas F.C. season =

Atlas
1994-95 season
- President: Fernando Acosta
- Manager: Marcelo Bielsa
- Stadium: Estadio Jalisco
- Primera Division: 13th
- Copa Mexico: Group stage
- Top goalscorer: Borgetti (13 goals)
Home colours	Away colours
- All statistics correct as of 27 January 2019.

The 1994–95 Atlas F.C. season is the 65th season in the football club's history and the 25th consecutive season in the top flight of Mexican football.

== Squad ==
Note: Flags indicate national team as defined under FIFA eligibility rules; some limited exceptions apply. Players may hold more than one non-FIFA nationality.

No.	Pos.	Nation	Player
—	GK	MEX	Oswaldo Sanchez
—	GK	MEX	Miguel de Jesus Fuentes
—	DF	MEX	Héctor López
—	DF	ARG	Eduardo Berizzo
—	DF	MEX	Humberto González
—	DF	MEX	Rodolfo Navarro
—	MF	MEX	Pavel Pardo
—	MF	MEX	Jorge Castañeda
—	MF	MEX	Juan Carlos Chavez
—	MF	MEX	Esteve Padilla
—	MF	USA	Martin Vasquez

No.	Pos.	Nation	Player
—	MF	MEX	Miguel Salcedo
—	MF	ARG	Alfredo Berti
—	MF	MEX	Omar Avilán
—	FW	MEX	Jared Borgetti
—	FW	MEX	Damián Alvarez
—	FW	MEX	Sergio Pacheco
—	FW	ARG	Martín Félix Ubaldi
—	FW	ARG	Ricardo Lunari
—	FW	ARG	Cristian Domizzi

=== Transfers ===
In
Pos.	Name	from	Type
FW	Ricardo Lunari	U Catolica	loan

Out
Pos.	Name	To	Type

==== Winter ====
In
Pos.	Name	from	Type
MF	Alfredo Berti	Newell's Old Boys	

Out
Pos.	Name	To	Type
FW	Ricardo Lunari	Puebla FC	loan ended

== Competitions ==
=== La Liga ===
==== League table ====
===== Group 1 =====
Pos	Team	Pld	W	D	L	GF	GA	GD	Pts	Qualification
1	Santos Laguna	36	13	9	14	61	62	−1	35	Playoff
2	Monterrey	36	9	15	12	37	52	−15	33	Playoff
3	Atlas	36	12	8	16	43	52	−9	32	
4	León	36	11	9	16	39	55	−16	31	

===== General table =====
Pos	Team	Pld	W	D	L	GF	GA	GD	Pts	Qualification
11	Monterrey	36	9	15	12	37	52	−15	33	Qualification for the Repechaje (Note: Teams ranked 5th, 7th, 9th and 11th in the table qualified for Repechaje)
12	Toros Neza	36	12	8	16	55	62	−7	32	
13	Atlas	36	12	8	16	43	52	−9	32	
14	Leon	36	11	9	16	39	55	−16	31	
15	Morelia	36	9	12	15	54	75	−21	30	

Source: Liga MX
Rules for classification: 1) Points; 2) Goal difference; 3) Number of goals scored; 4) Head-to-head results between tied teams; 5) Number of goals scored away; 6) Highest relegation coefficient; 7) Fair Play points

===== Results by round =====
Round	1	2	3	4	5	6	7	8	9	10	11	12	13	14	15	16	17	18	19	20	21	22	23	24	25	26	27	28	29	30	31	32	33	34	35	36	37	38
Ground	H	A	H	A	H	A	H	A	A	H	A	H	A	H	A	H	A	H	A	A	H	A	H	A	H	A	H	H	A	H	A	H	A	H	A	H	A	H
Result	L	W	W	W	L	W	D	L	D	D	L	W	L	L	L	L	W	L	-	D	L	L	W	D	L	W	W	D	L	L	L	D	D	W	W	W	L	-
Position	14	12	5	3	3	3	3	7	7	7	8	6	8	10	10	13	11	13	13	13	14	16	13	14	15	12	12	11	11	15	16	16	15	12	11	10	11	12

Source: Competitive matches
A = Away; H = Home; W = Win; D = Draw; L = Loss; P = Postponed; = Leader, Qualification for the quarter-finals; C = Qualification for the quarter-finals as group leader.; E = Qualification for the quarter-finals as group runner-up.; R = Qualification for the Repechaje.

==== Matches ====
3 September 1994 1	Atlas FC	1-2	Veracruz	Guadalajara
	Cristian Domizzi 17'		41' Mario Ramírez; 71' Poblete	Stadium: Jalisco

11 September 1994 2	America	0-1	Atlas	Coyoacan
			61' Cristian Domizzi	Stadium: Azteca

17 September 1994 3	Atlas	1-0	UNAM	Guadalajara
	Berizzo 18' (pen.)			Stadium: Jalisco

24 September 1994 4	Tampico Madero	1-3	Atlas	Tampico
	Héctor del Ángel 72'		32' Sergio Pacheco; 80' Pardo; 89' Ubaldi	Stadium: Tamaulipas

1 October 1994 5	Atlas	0-3	Necaxa	Guadalajara
			Aspe 47'; José María Higareda 56'; Basay 89'	Stadium: Jalisco

9 October 1994 6	Toluca	1-2	Atlas	Toluca
	Pavon 87'		49' Cristian Domizzi; 56' Borgetti	Stadium: La Bombonera

15 October 1994 7	Atlas	2-2	Monterrey	Guadalajara
	Eduardo Berizzo 29' (pen.); Ricardo Lunari 51'		25', 70' Carlos Alberto Bianchezi	Stadium: Jalisco

23 October 1994 8	Leon	2-0	Atlas	Leon de los Aldama
	Gustavo Dezotti 65'; Ricardo Enríquez 80'			Stadium: Nou Camp

30 October 1994 9	Puebla	1-1	Atlas	Puebla de los Angeles
	Francisco Rotllán 73'		50' (pen.) Eduardo Berizzo	Stadium: Cuauhtemoc

5 November 1994 10	Atlas	1-1	UAG	Guadalajara
	Sergio Pacheco 49'		52' Jaime Ordiales	Stadium: Jalisco

13 November 1994 11	Santos Laguna	2-1	Atlas	Torreon
	Ricardo Wagner de Souza 67'; Héctor Adomaitis 89'		61' Martín Félix Ubaldi	Stadium: Corona

19 November 1994 12	Atlas	2-1	Cruz Azul	Guadalajara
	Eduardo Berizzo 39', Jared Borguetti 44'		48' Luis Carlos de Oliveira	Stadium: Jalisco

27 November 1994 13	Morelia	4-1	Atlas	Morelia
	Mario Juárez 12'; Marco Antonio Figueroa 71' (pen.), 88'; Luis Hernán Pérez 77'		7' Cristian Domizzi	Stadium: Morelos

30 November 1994 14	Atlas	0-1	Atlante	Guadalajara
			8' Romano	Stadium: Jalisco

6 December 1994 15	UAT	3-1	Atlas	Ciudad Victoria
	Carlos Orozco 37'; Daniel Corral 60'; Alex Pineda 79'		74' Sergio Pacheco	Stadium: Marte R.Gomez

10 December 1994 16	Atlas	1-2	UANL	Guadalajara
	Cristian Domizzi 63'		46', 81' Javier Lozano	Stadium: Jalisco

18 December 1994 17	Toros Neza	1-2	Atlas	Ciudad Nezahualcoyotl
	Guillermo Vázquez 70' (pen.)		14' Jared Borguetti; 23' Sergio Pacheco	Stadium: Neza 86

23 December 1994 18	Atlas	0-1	Guadalajara	Guadalajara
			27'Carlos Turrubiates	Stadium: Jalisco

29 December 1994 19	UdeG	bye	Atlas	Guadalajara
				Stadium: Jalisco

7 January 1995 20	Veracruz	0-0	Atlas	Veracruz
				Stadium: Pirata Fuente

18 January 1995 21	Atlas	1-2	America	Guadalajara
	Sergio Pacheco 5'		53' Kalusha Bwalya; 70' Luis Roberto Alves "Zague"	Stadium: Jalisco

21 January 1995 22	UNAM	1-0	Atlas	Tlalpan
	Claudio Suárez 75'			Stadium: Olimpico Universitario

28 January 1995 23	Atlas	1-0	TM Gallos Blancos	Guadalajara
	Borgetti 89'			Stadium: Jalisco

4 February 1995 24	Necaxa	2-2	Atlas	Tlalpan
	Aspe 68', 71' (pen.)		33' Héctor López; 44' Borgetti	Stadium: Azteca

11 February 1995 25	Atlas	2-3	Toluca	Guadalajara
	Berizzo 10'; Borgetti 30'		2', 77' Abundis; 88' Alfaro	Stadium: Jalisco

18 February 1995 26	Monterrey	0-1	Atlas	Monterrey
			22' Pavel Pardo	Stadium: Tecnológico

25 February 1995 27	Atlas	2-0	Leon	Guadalajara
	Arturo Beltrán 51'; Borgetti 84'			Stadium: Jalisco

4 March 1995 28	Atlas	1-1	Puebla	Guadalajara
	Jared Borguetti 20'		72' Antonio Teodoro Dos Santos "Toninho"	Stadium: Jalisco

10 March 1995 29	UAG	2-0	Atlas	Zapopan
	Hugo Aparecido 72' (pen.); Donizete 78'			Stadium: 3 de Marzo

18 March 1995 30	Atlas	1-3	Santos Laguna	Guadalajara
	Esteve Padilla 58'		Galindo 18'; Miguel Asprilla 81'; Antonio Apud 83'	Stadium: Jalisco

25 March 1995 31	Cruz Azul	4-0	Atlas	Tlalpan
	Zamora 27'; Agustín Morales 37'; Hermosillo 71', 89' (pen.)			Stadium: Azteca

1 April 1995 32	Atlas	1-1	Morelia	Guadalajara
	Eduardo Berizzo 43' (pen.)		56' Marco Antonio Figueroa	Stadium: Jalisco

1 April 1995 33	Atlante	2-2	Atlas	Benito Juarez
	Salvador 45'; Romano 80'		12' Borgetti; 86' Borgetti	Stadium: Azulgrana

8 April 1995 34	Atlas	4-0	UAT	Guadalajara
	Cristian Domizzi 5', 89'; Borgetti 66', 70'			Stadium: Jalisco

15 April 1995 35	UANL	0-1	Atlas	San Nicolas de los Garza
			12' Arturo Beltrán	Stadium: Universitario

22 April 1995 36	Atlas	3-1	Toros Neza	Guadalajara
	Sergio Pacheco 54', 72'; Borgetti 64'		79' Carlos Alfredo Reinoso	Stadium: Jalisco

30 April 1995 37	Guadalajara	2-1	Atlas	Guadalajara
	Camilo Romero 18'; Ignacio Vázquez 25' (pen.)		89' Héctor López	Stadium: Jalisco

5 May 1995 38	Atlas	bye	UdeG	Guadalajara
				Stadium: Jalisco
