= 1995–96 Tigres UANL season =

Club Deportivo Tigres UANL
1995–96 season
- Owner: State Government of Nuevo Leon
- President: Guillermo Lara (until 1 February 1996); Reyes Tamez (caretaker for the rest of season)
- Manager: Victor Manuel Vucetich
- Stadium: Universitario
- Primera Division: 10th (Relegated to 1996–97 Primera Division A)
- Copa Mexico: Winners
- Top goalscorer: Sergio Almaguer (7 goals)
- Biggest win: 3–0 vs Club Leon (16 March 1996)
- Biggest defeat: 0–5 vs Cruz Azul (21 December 1995)
- All statistics correct as of 27 June 1996.

The 1995–96 Tigres UANL season is the 36th season in the football club's history and the 29th consecutive season in the top flight of Mexican football.

== Summary ==
In summertime, Manuel Silos in his 4th year as Dean of the University of Nuevo Leon appointed sports agent Guillermo Lara as new club president in a desperate effort to rescue the team from its first relegation ever. Thanks to Lara, two times (1991–92 and 1993–94) league Champion manager Victor Manuel Vucetich was appointed as new head coach after being discarded by Silos in 1993. Also, Lara reinforced the squad with several transfers in: Goalkeepers Robert Dante Siboldi (Puebla) and Miguel de Jesús Fuentes (Atlas), Defenders Alfredo Murguía (León), Marcos Ayala (Toluca), Arnulfo Tinoco (Toluca) and Francisco Gómez (Morelia), Midfielders Omar Arellano (Chivas) and José Manuel “Chepo” De la Torre (Chivas) and Argentine Forward Martin Felix Ubaldi (Atlas). However, the club had four failed bids: Juan Carlos Chávez (Atlas), Osmar Donizete (Tecos), Eric Wynalda and Ivo Basay all of them explicit petitions by manager Vucetich. On 1 February 1996 Manuel Silos resigned his post as University Dean following allegations of massive corruption during his tenure, also being the last day of Guillermo Lara as chairman, then, Reyes Tamez was appointed as interim president until June 1996.

In spite of the squad clinches 1995-96 Copa Mexico Final against heavily favourites Atlas FC -its first cup trophy since 1976– on 24 March 1996 the club was relegated to 1996-97 Primera División A season for the first since 1974 after lost the match against its archrival CF Monterrey on round 32 with 5 points below Atlético Morelia over the relegation table.

== Squad ==
Note: Flags indicate national team as defined under FIFA eligibility rules; some limited exceptions apply. Players may hold more than one non-FIFA nationality.

No.	Pos.	Nation	Player
1	GK	URU	Robert Dante Siboldi
—	GK	MEX	Miguel de Jesus Fuentes
—	DF	MEX	Alfredo Murguia
—	DF	MEX	Marcos Ayala
—	DF	MEX	Arnulfo Tinoco
—	DF	MEX	Guillermo Muñoz
—	DF	MEX	Roberto Ruiz Esparza
—	DF	MEX	Francisco Gómez
—	DF	MEX	Raúl Llanes
—	MF	MEX	Martín Castañeda
8	MF	MEX	José Manuel de la Torre
27	MF	MEX	Omar Arellano
—	MF	MEX	Felipe Ayala
—	MF	MEX	Humberto Gonzalez

No.	Pos.	Nation	Player
—	MF	ITA	Pietro Maiellaro
—	MF	MEX	Daniel Deeke
—	MF	USA	Tab Ramos
—	MF	CHI	Jaime Pizarro
—	MF	MEX	Fabián Peña
—	MF	MEX	Javier Lozano
—	MF	MEX	Marco Antonio Ruiz
—	FW	BIH	Sead Seferovic
—	FW	MEX	David Oliva
—	FW	MEX	Sergio Almaguer
—	FW	ARG	Martin Felix Ubaldi
—	FW	MEX	Juan Antonio Flores Barrera
—	FW	BIH	Almir Turkovic

=== Transfers ===
In
Pos.	Name	from	Type
GK	Robert Dante Siboldi	Puebla FC	
GK	Miguel de Jesus Fuentes	Atlas FC	
DF	Alfredo Murguia	Club Leon	
DF	Guillermo Muñoz	Club Leon	
DF	Arnulfo Tinoco	CD Toluca	
DF	Marcos Ayala	CD Toluca	
DF	Francisco Javier Gomez	Atlético Morelia	
MF	Pietro Maiellaro	Palermo FC	
MF	José Manuel de la Torre	CD Guadalajara	
MF	Omar Arellano	CD Guadalajara	
FW	Martin Felix Ubaldi	Atlas FC	
FW	Sergio Almaguer	Correcaminos UAT	loan ended
FW	Sead Seferovic	Hadjuk Split	

Out
Pos.	Name	To	Type
FW	Mariano Varela	CD Guadalajara	
FW	Gustavo Napoles	CD Guadalajara	
GK	Martin Zuñiga	CD Guadalajara	
MF	Antonio Carlos Santos	CD Veracruz	
FW	Andre da Costa Maciel Gilson		
GK	Alberto Aguilar		
DF	Cesilio de los Santos	Puebla FC	
DF	Carlos Muñoz		retired
DF	Miguel España	Santos Laguna	
MF	Marco Antonio Ruiz	CF Pachuca	loan
MF	Dante Juarez	CF Pachuca	
FW	Francisco Javier Cruz	Atlante FC	
DF	Carlos Diaz	CD Veracruz	

==== Winter ====
In
Pos.	Name	from	Type
MF	Marco Antonio Ruiz	CF Pachuca	loan ended
FW	Juan Antonio Flores Barrera	Atlético Morelia	
FW	Almir Turkovic	SK Vorwärts Steyr	

Out
Pos.	Name	To	Type
DF	Roberto Ruiz Esparza	Necaxa	
DF	Juan Carlos Ortega	Leon	
MF	Jaime Pizarro	CD Palestino	

== Competitions ==
=== La Liga ===
==== League table ====
===== Group 1 =====
Pos	Team	Pld	W	D	L	GF	GA	GD	Pts	Qualification
1	Veracruz	34	15	5	14	44	45	−1	50	Playoff
2	UANL	34	12	13	9	38	38	0	49	Playoff
3	Guadalajara	34	11	10	13	37	42	−5	43	
4	Santos	34	9	10	15	41	43	−2	37	
5	Toluca	34	10	7	17	33	45	−12	37	

===== Results by round =====
Round	1	2	3	4	5	6	7	8	9	10	11	12	13	14	15	16	17	18	19	20	21	22	23	24	25	26	27	28	29	30	31	32	33	34
Ground	H	A	H	A	H	A	A	H	A	H	A	H	A	H	A	H	A	A	H	A	H	A	H	H	A	H	A	H	A	H	A	H	A	H
Result	D	D	W	D	W	D	D	D	D	L	W	L	W	W	L	W	L	L	D	W	D	D	W	W	D	L	L	W	D	W	L	L	D	W
Position	12	11	4	6	5	5	4	6	7	9	6	11	7	4	6	4	7	11	8	8	8	10	8	5	7	9	10	8	7	5	8	9	10	10
Relegation	18	18	18	18	18	18	18	18	18	18	18	18	18	18	18	18	18	18	18	18	18	18	18	18	18	18	18	18	18	18	18	18	18	18

Source: Competitive matches
A = Away; H = Home; W = Win; D = Draw; L = Loss; P = Postponed; = Leader, Advance to the quarter-finals; = Relegated to 1996–97 Primera Division A; C = Advance to the quarter-finals as group leader.; E = Qualification for the quarter-finals as group runner-up.; R = Qualification for the Repechaje.

==== Relegation table ====
Pos.	Team	Pts.	Pld.	Ave.
14.	Atlante	101	108	0.9352
15.	Toros Neza	100	108	0.9259
16.	Puebla	96	108	0.8889
17.	Morelia	96	108	0.8889
18.	UANL	91	108	0.8426

==== Matches ====
26 August 1995 1	UANL	1–1	Cruz Azul	San Nicolas de los Garza
	Ramos 63' (pen.)		88' Octavio Mora	Stadium: Universitario

3 September 1995 2	Santos Laguna	1–1	UANL	Torreon
	Carlos Alberto Juárez 17'		79' Almaguer	Stadium: Corona

9 September 1995 3	UANL	2–0	Atlante FC	San Nicolas de los Garza
	Almaguer 85'; Javier Lozano 90'			Stadium: Universitario

18 September 1995 4	América	1–1	Tigres UANL	Tlalpan
	Biyik 83'		31' Ubaldi	Stadium: Azteca

23 September 1995 5	UANL	1–0	Morelia	San Nicolas de los Garza
12:00 CT	Marcos Ayala 90'			Stadium: Universitario

30 September 1995 6	Atlas	2–2	UANL	Guadalajara
	Pedro Duana 5'; Berizzo 49' (pen.)		10' Omar Arellano; 60' Almaguer	Stadium: Jalisco

6 October 1995 7	UNAM	1–1	UANL	Tlalpan
	Luna 71'		29' Almaguer	Stadium: Olimpico Universitario

14 October 1995 8	UANL	2–2	Toluca	San Nicolas de los Garza
	Javier Lozano 19'; Arnulfo Tinoco 43'		26' José Manuel Abundis; 39' Enrique Alfaro	Stadium: Universitario

22 October 1995 9	Toros Neza	1–1	UANL	Ciudad Nezahualcoyotl
	Pineda 1'		61' Ayala	Stadium: Estadio Neza 86

28 October 1995 10	UANL	0–2	Necaxa	San Nicolas de los Garza
			8' Zarate; 90' Luis Hernandez	Stadium: Universitario

4 November 1994 11	Atletico Celaya	0–1	UANL	Celaya
			35' Seferovic	Stadium: Miguel Aleman Valdes

11 November 1995 12	UANL	0–1	Guadalajara	San Nicolas de los Garza
			22' Espinosa	Stadium: Universitario

18 November 1995 13	Leon	0–1	UANL	Leon de los Aldama
			20' Arellano	Stadium: Nou Camp

25 November 1995 14	UANL	3–2	Tecos UAG	San Nicolas de los Garza
	Almaguer 48', 86'; Lozano 59'		5' Rizo; 80' Gallaga	Stadium: Universitario

30 November 1994 15	Monterrey	2–1	UANL	Monterrey
	Aredes 58'; Noriega 82'	;	85' Seferovic	Stadium: Tecnológico

9 December 1995 16	UANL	3–2	Puebla FC	San Nicolas de los Garza
	Peña 1'; Lozano 55'; Ramos 89'		66' Luis Salazar; 75'Richard Tavares	Stadium: Universitario

16 December 1995 17	Veracruz	4–0	UANL	Veracruz
	Santos 45', 79'; Gustavo Gaytán 86'; Arboleda 89' (pen.)			Stadium: Pirata Fuente

21 December 1995 18	Cruz Azul	5–0	UANL	Tlalpan
	Hermosillo 44', 55', 69'; Palencia 73'; Rangel 87'			Stadium: Azteca

30 December 1995 19	UANL	0–0	Santos Laguna	San Nicolas de los Garza
				Stadium: Universitario

7 January 1995 20	Atlante	1–2	UANL	Benito Juarez
12:00 CT	Mario Jáuregui 25'		40' Seferovic; 89' Ayala	Stadium: Azulgrana

13 January 1996 21	UANL	1–1	America	San Nicolas de los Garza
	Lozano 90'		77' Lozano	Stadium: Universitario

21 January 1996 22	Morelia	1–1	UANL	Morelia
	Alberto Durán 40'		77' Ubaldi	Stadium: Morelos

28 January 1996 23	UANL	1–0	Atlas	Tampico
	Ayala 46'			Stadium: Tamaulipas
Note: Match not played at Universitario Stadium due to a ban.

3 February 1996 24	UANL	2–1	Pumas UNAM	San Nicolas de los Garza
	Murguia 9'; Lozano 71'		69' Olalde	Stadium: Universitario

11 February 1996 25	CD Toluca	0–0	UANL	Toluca
				Stadium: La Bombonera

17 February 1996 26	UANL	0–1	Toros Neza	San Nicolas de los Garza
			40' Pineda	Stadium: Universitario

24 February 1996 27	Necaxa	2–1	UANL	Tlalpan
	Aspe 2', 24'		79' Flores Barrera	Stadium: Azteca

2 March 1996 28	UANL	2–0	Atletico Celaya	San Nicolas de los Garza
	Armando Cabrera 57' (own goal)} Hurtado 63' (own goal)			Stadium: Universitario

10 March 1996 29	Guadalajara	1–1	UANL	Guadalajara
	Napoles 90'	;	46' Almaguer	Stadium: Jalisco

16 March 1996 30	UANL	3–0	Leon	San Nicolas de los Garza
	de la Torre 52' (pen.), 79' (pen.); Flores Barrera 86'			Stadium: Universitario

20 March 1996 31	UAG	1–0	UANL	Guadalajara
	Parra 88'			Stadium: Jalisco

24 March 1996 32	UANL	1–2	CF Monterrey	San Nicolas de los Garza
	Omar Arellano 18'		22' Verdirame; 25' Salvador	Stadium: Universitario

30 March 1996 33	Puebla	0–0	UANL	Puebla de los Angeles
				Stadium: Cuauhtemoc

7 April 1996 34	UANL	2–0	Veracruz	San Nicolas de los Garza
	de la Torre 72'; Turkovic 89'			Stadium: Universitario

==== Repechaje ====
10 April 1996	UANL	4–1	León	San Nicolás de los Garza
20:45	Lozano 26', 50', 60'; Almaguer 84'		Álvarez 49'	Stadium: Universitario

13 April 1996	León	3–1 (4–5 agg.)	UANL	León
20:45	Ordiales 23'; Peña 47'; Álvarez 88' (pen.)		Lozano 56'	Stadium: Nou Camp

==== Quarterfinals ====
17 April 1996	UANL	0–1	Necaxa	San Nicolás de los Garza
20:45			Aguinaga 59'	Stadium: Universitario

20 April 1996	Necaxa	1–1	UANL	Tlalpan
17:00	Aguinaga 87' (pen.)		16'Seferović	Stadium: Estadio Azteca

=== Copa Mexico ===
==== Semifinals ====
14 February 1996	Cruz Azul	1–0	Tigres UANL	Cd. Cooperativa Cruz Azul
	Julio César Yegros			Stadium: Estadio 10 de Diciembre

21 February 1996	Tigres UANL	4–2	Cruz Azul	San Nicolás de los Garza
	Francisco Javier Gómez; Francisco Javier Gómez, Martín Castañeda		Carlos Hermosillo,	Stadium: Universitario

==== Final ====
27 February 1996	Tigres UANL	1–1	Atlas	San Nicolás de los Garza
	Sergio Almaguer 30'		64' Eduardo Berizzo	Stadium: Estadio Universitario

6 March 1996	Atlas	0–1	Tigres UANL	Guadalajara
			79' Arnulfo Tinoco	Stadium: Estadio Jalisco

== Statistics ==
=== Players statistics ===
No.	Pos	Nat	Player	Total		Liga		Copa	
No.	Pos	Nat	Player	Apps	Goals	Apps	Goals	Apps	Goals
1	GK	(Uruguay) URU	Siboldi	34	-38	34	-38		
3	DF	(Mexico) MEX	Ayala	31	4	31	4		
4	DF	(Mexico) MEX	Murguia	33	1	33	1		
20	DF	(Mexico) MEX	Tinoco	28	1	28	1		
17	DF	(Mexico) MEX	Gomez	30	0	29 +1	0		
6	MF	(Mexico) MEX	Arellano	28	3	26 +2	3		
21	MF	(Mexico) MEX	Ruiz	33	0	26 +7	0		
15	MF	(Mexico) MEX	Castañeda	23	0	20 +3	0		
22	MF	(Mexico) MEX	Lozano	31	6	28 +3	6		
9	FW	(Mexico) MEX	Almaguer	27	7	25 +2	7		
11	FW	(Argentina) ARG	Ubaldi	26	2	19 +7	2		
12	GK	(Mexico) MEX	Fuentes	0	0	0	0		
10	MF	(United States) USA	Ramos	23	2	18 +5	2		
8	MF	(Mexico) MEX	de la Torre	22	3	15 +7	3		
18	FW	(Bosnia and Herzegovina) BIH	Seferovic	16	3	9 +7	3		
16	DF	(Mexico) MEX	Muñoz	5	0	5	0		
27	FW	(Mexico) MEX	Flores Barrera	15	2	4 +11	2		
38	MF	(Mexico) MEX	Peña	6	1	4 +2	1		
2	DF	(Mexico) MEX	Esparza	9	0	3 +6	0		
25	MF	(Italy) ITA	Maiellaro	8	0	3 +5	0		
14	MF	(Mexico) MEX	Deeke	11	0	2 +9	0		
28	FW	(Bosnia and Herzegovina) BIH	Turkovic	7	1	2 +5	1		
19	MF	(Mexico) MEX	Bueno	6	0	1 +5	0		
26	MF	(Mexico) MEX	Gonzalez	1	0	0 +1	0		
60	FW	(Mexico) MEX	Oliva	1	0	0 +1	0		
70	MF	(Mexico) MEX	Ayala	1	0	0 +1	0		

- Source: http://yalma.fime.uanl.mx/~futmx/MFL/Mex96/News/norte29jn95.html
