= 1995–96 Mexican Primera División season =

54th professional season of the top-flight football league in Mexico

Primera División de México
- Season: 1995–96
- Champions: Necaxa (2nd title)
- Relegated: UANL
- Champions' Cup: Necaxa; Cruz Azul
- Top goalscorer: Carlos Hermosillo (26 goals)

The following are statistics about Primera División de México, the top professional soccer league in Mexico, for the 1995–96 season.

== Overview ==
It was contested by 18 teams, and Necaxa won the championship.

Celaya was promoted from Primera División 'A'.

UANL was relegated to Primera División 'A'.

=== Teams ===
Location of the 1995-96 Primera División teams

Team	City	Stadium
América	Mexico City	Azteca
Atlante	Mexico City	Azulgrana
Atlas	Guadalajara, Jalisco	Jalisco
Celaya	Celaya, Guanajuato	Miguel Alemán Valdés
Cruz Azul	Mexico City	Azteca
Guadalajara	Guadalajara, Jalisco	Jalisco
León	León, Guanajuato	Nou Camp
Morelia	Morelia, Michoacán	Morelos
Monterrey	Monterrey, Nuevo León	Tecnológico
Necaxa	Mexico City	Azteca
Toros Neza	Nezahualcóyotl, State of Mexico	Neza 86
Puebla	Puebla, Puebla	Cuauhtémoc
Santos Laguna	Torreón, Coahuila	Corona
Tecos	Zapopan, Jalisco	Tres de Marzo
Toluca	Toluca, State of Mexico	La Bombonera
UANL	Monterrey, Nuevo León	Universitario
UNAM	Mexico City	Olímpico Universitario
Veracruz	Veracruz, Veracruz	Luis "Pirata" Fuente

== Pre-season ==
=== Copa Pachuca ===
Source: RSSSF

Semi-finals
17 August – Estadio Hidalgo
Cruz Azul	2
Saprissa	3
17 August – Estadio Hidalgo
Pachuca	1 (3)
América	1 (5)

Final
19 August – Estadio Hidalgo
América	4
Saprissa	1
Third place
19 August – Estadio Hidalgo
Pachuca	1
Cruz Azul	2

== Regular season ==
=== Group 1 ===
Pos	Team	Pld	W	D	L	GF	GA	GD	Pts	Qualification
1	Veracruz	34	15	5	14	44	45	−1	50	Playoff
2	UANL	34	12	13	9	38	38	0	49	Playoff
3	Guadalajara	34	11	10	13	37	42	−5	43	
4	Santos	34	9	10	15	41	43	−2	37	
5	Toluca	34	10	7	17	33	45	−12	37	

=== Group 2 ===
Pos	Team	Pld	W	D	L	GF	GA	GD	Pts	Qualification
1	Celaya	34	14	10	10	49	46	+3	52	Playoff
2	América	34	10	16	8	57	45	+12	46	Playoff
3	Morelia	34	9	9	16	36	52	−16	36	
4	Atlante	34	7	12	15	39	56	−17	33	
5	Puebla	34	6	10	18	29	54	−25	28	

=== Group 3 ===
Pos	Team	Pld	W	D	L	GF	GA	GD	Pts	Qualification
1	Cruz Azul	34	14	14	6	61	38	+23	56	Playoff
2	Monterrey	34	13	12	9	52	47	+5	51	Playoff
3	UNAM	34	13	11	10	50	41	+9	50	Playoff
4	León	34	13	11	10	55	49	+6	50	Playoff

=== Group 4 ===
Pos	Team	Pld	W	D	L	GF	GA	GD	Pts	Qualification
1	Necaxa	34	15	10	9	58	41	+17	55	Playoff
2	Atlas	34	14	11	9	51	45	+6	53	Playoff
3	Toros Neza	34	13	11	10	53	50	+3	50	
4	Tecos	34	8	18	8	41	47	−6	42	

=== Results ===
Home \ Away	AME	ATE	ATS	CEL	CAZ	GDL	LEO	MTY	MOR	NEC	PUE	SAN	TEC	TOL	TRN	UNL	UNM	VER
América	—	3–3	2–0	4–1	1–2	2–3	3–1	4–1	3–1	4–4	1–3	1–0	3–1	1–1	1–1	1–1	2–2	3–0
Atlante	3–2	—	0–1	1–2	1–1	0–0	2–1	0–1	1–4	2–4	1–0	2–1	2–2	2–0	1–1	1–2	0–3	0–1
Atlas	1–1	0–2	—	0–1	3–1	2–0	3–2	1–3	1–0	2–2	1–1	2–0	3–0	1–0	4–3	2–2	1–1	2–1
Celaya	2–2	0–0	0–2	—	0–0	1–1	0–2	1–1	1–1	2–1	2–2	2–1	1–1	0–1	1–1	0–1	4–2	1–0
Cruz Azul	1–1	1–1	1–2	2–3	—	0–0	1–1	2–2	1–1	0–2	5–1	0–0	2–2	3–0	1–1	5–0	1–2	3–2
Guadalajara	0–2	1–0	5–2	3–4	2–3	—	0–4	4–2	0–1	1–0	0–1	1–0	1–1	1–0	0–0	1–1	3–0	1–2
León	2–2	3–0	2–1	2–2	1–1	1–1	—	1–1	2–1	3–1	2–0	4–3	3–3	2–0	1–1	0–1	3–2	0–1
Monterrey	0–0	3–1	2–2	1–2	0–2	0–0	2–2	—	2–2	1–0	4–1	2–1	6–1	1–0	2–1	2–1	2–1	1–4
Morelia	1–1	2–2	1–4	1–3	1–3	2–1	2–2	2–0	—	3–2	2–1	0–1	0–0	0–1	0–1	1–1	0–1	1–0
Necaxa	1–0	2–1	3–3	3–1	0–2	4–0	3–0	2–2	2–1	—	0–0	1–1	1–2	2–3	2–0	2–1	2–1	1–0
Puebla	2–2	1–1	1–1	0–1	1–3	0–0	1–1	1–0	0–1	1–1	—	2–3	0–2	1–0	0–1	0–0	1–3	2–0
Santos	1–1	0–0	0–1	2–1	2–4	0–2	0–1	0–0	3–0	2–1	1–0	—	0–0	0–1	2–1	1–1	1–3	5–0
Tecos	2–1	2–2	0–0	2–1	0–1	2–2	0–1	0–0	1–1	0–0	0–2	1–1	—	2–1	1–0	1–0	1–1	1–1
Toluca	0–2	2–2	3–1	1–3	0–2	1–0	0–1	3–2	0–1	1–4	5–0	2–2	0–2	—	1–1	0–0	2–1	1–0
Toros Neza	2–0	3–0	0–0	1–4	2–5	1–0	4–3	2–3	3–2	1–3	2–1	3–2	3–2	2–1	—	1–1	1–1	6–1
UANL	1–1	2–0	1–0	2–0	1–1	0–1	3–0	1–2	1–0	0–2	3–2	0–0	3–2	2–2	0–1	—	2–1	2–0
UNAM	0–0	3–4	2–2	1–0	2–1	1–2	1–0	1–1	3–0	0–0	4–0	1–0	2–2	1–0	0–0	1–1	—	2–1
Veracruz	1–0	2–1	2–0	1–2	0–0	2–0	3–1	1–0	4–0	0–0	1–0	2–5	2–2	0–0	4–2	4–0	1–0	—

Updated to match(es) played on 7 April 1996. Source: RSSSF
Legend: Blue = home team win; Yellow = draw; Red = away team win.

=== Relegation table ===
Pos.	Team	Pts.	Pld.	Ave.
14.	Atlante	101	108	0.9352
15.	Toros Neza	100	108	0.9259
16.	Puebla	96	108	0.8889
17.	Morelia	96	108	0.8889
18.	UANL	91	108	0.8426

== Playoffs ==
=== Repechaje ===
Repechaje					Qualifiers
10	UANL	4	1	5
7	León	1	3	4	10	UANL
11	América	2	0	2	11	América
6	UNAM	0	0	0

April 10, 1996
20:45

UANL	4-1	León
Lozano 26', 50', 60'; Almaguer 84'		Álvarez 49'

Estadio Universitario, San Nicolás de los Garza
April 13, 1996
20:45

León	3-1	UANL
Ordiales 23'; Peña 47'; Álvarez 88' (pen.)		Lozano 56'

Nou Camp, León

UANL won 4-5 on aggregate.

April 11, 1996
20:45

América	2-0	UNAM
Omam-Biyik 31'; Luis García 87'

Estadio Azteca, Mexico City
April 14, 1996
12:00

UNAM	0-0	América

Estadio Olímpico Universitario, Mexico City

América won 0-2 on aggregate.

=== Playoffs ===
Quarterfinals
4	Celaya (a)	2	0	2
5	Monterrey	2	0	2
3	Atlas	1	2	3
8	Veracruz (a)	1	2	3
2	Necaxa	1	1	2
10	UANL	0	1	1
1	Cruz Azul	0	2	2
11	América	3	0	3

Semifinals
2	Necaxa	2	1	3
11	América	0	1	1
4	Celaya	1	5	6
8	Veracruz	0	1	1

Finals
2	Necaxa (a)	1	0	1
4	Celaya	1	0	1

==== Quarter-finals ====
April 17, 1996
16:00

Veracruz	1-1	Atlas
Arboleda 81'		García 40'

Estadio Luis "Pirata" Fuente, Veracruz
April 20, 1996
20:45

Atlas	2-2	Veracruz
Salcedo 17'; García 33'		Gaytán 37'; Malibrán 76'

Estadio Jalisco, Guadalajara

Series tied 3-3 on aggregate. Veracruz advanced to semi-finals by away goals rule.

April 17, 1996
20:45

Monterrey	2-2	Celaya
Morales 64'; Verdirame 68' (pen.)		Butragueño 34', 51'

Estadio Tecnológico, Monterrey
April 20, 1996
20:15

Celaya	0-0	Monterrey

Estadio Miguel Alemán Valdés, Celaya

Series tied 2-2 on aggregate. Celaya advanced to semi-finals by away goals rule.

April 17, 1996
20:45

UANL	0-1	Necaxa
		Aguinaga 59'

Estadio Universitario, San Nicolás de los Garza
April 20, 1996
17:00

Necaxa	1-1	UANL
Aguinaga 87' (pen.)		Seferović 16'

Estadio Azteca, Mexico City

Necaxa won 2-1 on aggregate.

April 17, 1996
20:45

Cruz Azul	0-3	América
		Omam-Biyik 19'; Luis García 53', 60'

Estadio Azteca, Mexico City
April 21, 1996
20:00

América	0-2	Cruz Azul
		Palencia 5'; Villa 68' (own)

Estadio Azteca, Mexico City

América won 3-2 on aggregate.

==== Semi-finals ====
April 24, 1996
17:00

Veracruz	0-1	Celaya
		Mercado 50'

Estadio Luis "Pirata" Fuente, Veracruz
April 27, 1996
20:15

Celaya	5-1	Veracruz
Zambrano 16', 25', 35', 51'; Butragueño 87'		Santos 34'

Estadio Miguel Alemán Valdés, Celaya

Celaya won 6-1 on aggregate.

April 24, 1996
20:45

América	0-2	Necaxa
		Hernández 44'; Peláez 47'

Estadio Azteca, Mexico City
April 27, 1996
17:00

Necaxa	1-1	América
Peláez 41'		Omam-Biyik 17'

Estadio Azteca, Mexico City

Necaxa won 3-1 on aggregate.

==== Final ====
May 1, 1996
20:15

Celaya	1-1	Necaxa
Hernández 57'		Peláez 25'

Estadio Miguel Alemán Valdés, Celaya
May 4, 1996
17:00

Necaxa	0-0	Celaya

Estadio Azteca, Mexico City

1-1 on aggregate. Necaxa won on away goals.

1995-96 winners

2nd title
