= Martín Zúñiga (footballer, born 1970) =

Mexican footballer (born 1970)

Martin Zuniga
Personal information
- Full name: Martín Roberto Zúñiga Hernández
- Date of birth: 6 August 1970 (age 56)
- Place of birth: Tampico, Mexico
- Height: 1.77 m (5 ft 10 in)
- Position: Goalkeeper

Senior career*
Years	Team	Apps	(Gls)
1992–1995	Tigres UANL	47	(0)
1995–1999	Guadalajara	112	(0)
1999–2000	Atletico	5	(0)
2000–2001	Tecos	23	(0)
2001–2002	Guadalajara	2	(0)
2002–2003	Puebla	19	(0)
2003–2004	Veracruz	2	(0)
2005	Chivas USA	4	(0)
Total		214	(0)

International career
1997	Mexico	1	(0)
- * Club domestic league appearances and goals as of 25 August 2019

Martin Roberto Zúñiga Hernandez (Note: In this Spanish name, the first or paternal surname is Zúñiga and the second or maternal family name is Hernandez.) (born 6 August 1970), better known as "El Pulpo" Zúñiga (The Octopus), is a Mexican professional football analyst, sports anchor and former Major League Soccer goalkeeper. He is most recognized for his involvement in 1st division Mexican football or Liga MX and MLS. He was capped with the Mexico national football team. Martin retired from the league in 2005 after consecutive knee injuries. He is sought after for his expert MLS analytics, currently serving as an analyst and host for Fox Deportes.

== Early life ==
Born to Cruz Roberto Zúñiga Castañeda, a petroleum plant operator, and Maria Reina Hernandez de Zúñiga, Martin and his family moved to Nuevo Leon when he was 5 years old after his father was transferred to the petroleum plant located in Monterrey. Although Monterrey offered an assortment of youth baseball leagues, soccer became Martins main focus as he became submerged in local football youth leagues.

=== Youth leagues ===
His skills and his determination, even as a child, allowed him to participate in more advanced age leagues. At the age of 7 Martin began playing for Los Toros GURN alongside children 2 years his senior. Due to the scarcity of youth football leagues in Monterrey, Martin would travel great distances to participate in local leagues in neighboring Cadereyta, Nuevo Leon. While playing for the local leagues Martin was scouted by the president of the GPA, Gerencia De Proyectos y Almacenmiento, football team Guillermo Caceres who became a great influence on Martin's career and life. Guillermo helped promote Martin and became a mentor for him. The GPA football team provided the foundation and training Zúñiga needed to excel as an effective goalkeeper. Juan Gonzalez, football pro, was impressed by 18 year old Martin and invited him to the basic tryouts for the prestigious Club de Fútbol Tigres de la Universidad Autónoma de Nuevo León, Tigres UANL. 500 teenagers tried out, among them famous players Javier Lozano Chavira(El Pastor), es:David Oliva and Fabián Peña. Martin was one of three goalkeepers accepted into Las Reservas Profesional Tigrillos club, a third division sub team used to develop members into Club Tigres.

== First Division Mexico ==
Martin made his debut in the 1992–93 season, on March 13, 1993, for Club Tigres UANL in a match against Deportivo Toluca, in which Toluca scored no points, leading Tigres to win 2–0. In the 1995 season he was moved to the Chivas de Guadalajara where he would win the summer of '97 championship and obtain a sub-championship in the winter of '98. Being part of the national elections, Martin helped Mexico obtain 3rd place in the 1997 Copa América. After his 7th season with the Chivas de Guadalajara, Martin was sold to Celaya F.C. where he would play a brief season before returning to Guadalajara to deliver a solid season with Tecos UAG from 2000 to 2001. By the summer of 2002, Martin was back with Las Chivas de Guadalajara. He would be released to Puebla and finally requested by es:Daniel Guzmán Castañeda to play for Veracruz where he would suffer his first torn ligament across his left knee.

== Chivas USA & retirement from football ==
The Chivas USA team served as the American extension of the popular Mexican franchise Chivas de Guadalajara club. Martin was part of the first members who kicked off their inauguration season with a 2–0 loss against D.C. United on April 2, 2005. After playing 4 games with Chivas USA Martin suffered the final injury of his goalkeeping career, officially announcing his retirement on August 29, 2005. Martin was appointed Soccer Ambassador for the Chivas USA immediately after his retirement from the team. He oversaw the club's academy, scouted for youth talent and served as a spokesperson for community and sponsorship events until 2006.

== Sports analyst & anchor ==
Martin began his sports analyst career as a commentator for the Azteca America coverage on the 2006 FIFA World Cup Final. Propelled by the knowledge he acquired on the field in Mexico and the United States, Martin quickly became a trusted and well-respected voice in the Sports telecast realm. In September 2010 he was asked to join Mundo Deportivo as a pre and post show analyst. He conducted player interviews and recapped performances live on-air. Time Warner Cable developed the first regional Spanish-language sports cable network, based out of Los Angeles, and recruited Martin as an anchor for Tu Show Deportivo and Vamos Galaxy. He was also utilized by TWC as a voice over for the twice Emmy nominated show Galaxy Confidencial. Fox Deportes brought Martin onto its roster in 2009 as an analyst and anchor for projects such as Copa Libertadores, UEFA Champions League, Serie A, Mexican football and Exhibition game rounds. He continues to work with Fox as a co-host and MLS analyst.

== Developing The Youth ==
Martin participated as a judge and goalkeeping coach in the nationally televised Sueno MLS football talent show presented by Allstate. The winning child of the title El Portero Allstate became a mentee of Martin and gained admission to the football talent development program. Martin participated in the program from 2012 to 2015. Martin has partnered with Verizon Wireless to offer youth clinics throughout the country for children ages 10–17 Throughout the program Martin hosted a series of 3 hour long youth football clinics and provided football related supplies for aspiring players.

Martin, along with football superstars Claudio Suarez, Jorge Campos and Mariano Trujillo, founded the non-profit PRO ALLIANCE FC youth football organization that operates both recreational and competitive football leagues in Southern California. Pro Alliance FC was created to help community youth players develop physically, mentally and emotionally through professional guidance. Their program operates out of Montebello, California and Bell Gardens, California with plans on future expansion.
