= 1995–96 Copa México =

Tournament details
- Country: Mexico
- Teams: 32

Final positions
- Champions: Tigres UANL (2nd Title)
- Runners-up: Atlas

Tournament statistics
- Matches played: 31
- Goals scored: 99 (3.19 per match)

The 1995–96 Copa México is the 66th staging of the Copa México, the 39th staging in the professional era.

The competition started on January 23, 1996, and concluded on March 6, 1996, with the Final, in which Tigres UANL lifted the trophy for second time ever with a 2–1 victory over Atlas.

For this edition was played by 32 teams, between Primera División and Primera División A.

== Knock-out rounds ==
First Round; From January 23 to January 25
Pachuca	1
América	0
San Francisco	1
Toluca	0
Cruz Azul Hidalgo	1
Cruz Azul	2
Acapulco F.C.	1
Tecos	2
Hermosillo (p)	2(4)
Veracruz	2(3)
San Luis	0
Celaya	1
La Piedad	3
UNAM	2
Zacatepec	2
Tigres UANL	4
Tampico Madero	3
Neza	0
Correcaminos	0
Monterrey	2
Saltillo	1
Atlas	2
Tepic	1
León	3
Irapuato	3
Atlante F.C.	0
Marte	0
Necaxa	2
Yucatán	0
Guadalajara	2
Tijuana	0
Santos Laguna	2

Second Round; January 30 and January 31
Pachuca	2
San Francisco	1
Cruz Azul	1
Tecos	0
Hermosillo	2
Celaya	0
La Piedad	0
Tigres UANL	2
Tampico Madero	3
Monterrey	2
Atlas	4
León	1
Irapuato (p)	2(4)
Necaxa	2(1)
Guadalajara	2
Santos Laguna	1

Quarterfinals; February 6 and February 7
Pachuca	0
Cruz Azul	3
Hermosillo	1(2)
Tigres UANL (p)	1(4)
Tampico Madero	1(2)
Atlas (p)	1(3)
Irapuato	1
Guadalajara	4

Semifinals; From February 13 to February 21
Cruz Azul	3
Tigres UANL	4
Atlas	4
Guadalajara	3

Final; February 27 and March 6
Tigres UANL	2
Atlas	1

== Semifinals ==
=== First legs ===
13 February 1996

Atlas	4 – 2	Guadalajara
Omar Avilán; Gerardo Mascareño; Esteve Padilla; Pedro Duana		Guillermo Hernández; Daniel Guzmán

Estadio Jalisco, Guadalajara

14 February 1996

Cruz Azul	1 – 0	Tigres UANL
Julio César Yegros

Estadio 10 de Diciembre, Cd. Cooperativa Cruz Azul

=== Second legs ===
21 February 1996

Guadalajara	1 – 0	Atlas
Alberto Coyote

Estadio Azteca, Mexico DF

Atlas won 4–3 on aggregate. This game was played at Azteca stadium

21 February 1996

Tigres UANL	4 – 2	Cruz Azul
Francisco Javier Gómez; Francisco Javier Gómez, Martín Castañeda		Carlos Hermosillo,

Estadio Universitario, San Nicolás de los Garza

Tigres UANL won 4-3 on aggregate.

== Final ==
=== First legs ===
27 February 1996

Tigres UANL	1 – 1	Atlas
Sergio Almaguer		Eduardo Berizzo

Estadio Universitario, San Nicolás de los Garza

=== Second legs ===
6 March 1996

Atlas	0 – 1	Tigres UANL
		Arnulfo Tinoco

Estadio Jalisco, Guadalajara

Tigres UANL won 2-1 on aggregate.

Copa México 1995–96 Winners

2nd title

== Note ==
At the end of the regular season Tigres UANL was relegated to Primera División A
