= Martín Zúñiga =

Martín Zúñiga may refer to:

- Martín Zúñiga (footballer, born 1970), Mexican football analyst and anchor and former goalkeeper
- Martín Zúñiga (footballer, born 1993), Mexican football forward for Tepatitlán
