= Maiellaro (surname) =

Maiellaro is an Italian surname. Notable people with the surname include:

- Matt Maiellaro (born 1966), American voice actor, filmmaker and musician
- Pietro Maiellaro (born 1963), Italian footballer and manager
