= List of Tigres UANL seasons =

The following is a list of seasons played by Tigres UANL in Liga MX and other association football competitions from the 1967–68 season to the present. Friendlies are excluded.

On March 7, 1960, the Jabatos de Nuevo León ceased to exist after multiple financial problems led to the club being transferred to the Board of Trustees of the Autonomous University of Nuevo León, where it was initially managed by Ernesto Romero and Luis Lauro. The team was renamed Club Deportivo Universitario de Nuevo León, adopted the nickname Tigres and played in blue and yellow uniforms.

The club's first match in history took place on July 13, 1967, in the Second Division, where they secured a 2-2 draw against Orizaba at the Estadio Universitario; José de Jesús "Triquis" Morales became the club's first major scorer with a brace.

Tigres UANL has won the Liga MX eight times, the Copa México three times, the Campeón de Campeones four times, and the CONCACAF Champions League once. Their best result was a runner-up finish at the FIFA Club World Cup, becoming the first and only club from both Mexico and CONCACAF to achieve this.

== Key ==
Key to colors and symbols:

1st or W	Winners
2nd or RU	Runners-up
3rd	Third place
Last	Last place
Qual. Elimination round	From 4th place (Note: Generally, the teams that finish in the top eight of the standings table advance to the Liguilla; however, there have been occasions when a team has qualified from below eighth place.)
♦	League top scorer

To league record:

- Pld = Played
- W = Games won
- D = Games drawn
- L = Games lost
- GF = Goals for
- GA = Goals against
- Pts = Points
- Pos = Final position

Key to rounds:

- GS = Group stage
- R16 = Round of 16
- QF = Quarter-finals
- SF = Semi-finals
- RU = Runners-up
- W = Winners

== Seasons ==
Season	League (Note: Since the Torneo Apertura 2012, the tournament has been known under its current name, "Liga MX.")								Position		National Cups		Continental / Other		Tournament Top goalscorer(s)	
Season	Competition	Pld	W	D	L	GF	GA	Pts	Pos	Play-offs (Note: Known in Mexico as Liguilla.)	National Cups		Continental / Other		Name(s)	Goals
1967–68	Segunda División	34	5	11	18	30	73	21	17th	—	—	—	—	—		
1968–69	Segunda División	34	9	9	16	46	57	27	14th	—	—	—	—	—		
1969–70	Segunda División	34	14	12	8	54	43	40	4th	—	—	—	—	—		
Mexico 70	Segunda División	24	11	0	13	45	49	22	4th	—	—	—	—	—		
1970–71	Segunda División	32	14	10	8	37	28	38	6th	—	—	—	—	—		
1971–72	Segunda División	37	20	5	12	56	41	45	2nd	RU	—	—	—	—		
1972–73	Segunda División	36	17	8	11	57	34	42	5th	SF	—	—	—	—		
1973–74	Segunda División	42	24	8	10	79	49	56	2nd	W	—	—	—	—		
1974–75	Primera División	38	8	18	12	47	61	34	6th	—	—	—	—	—		
1975–76	Primera División	38	12	13	13	50	54	37	12th	—	COPAMX	W	—	—		
1976–77	Primera División	38	9	12	17	39	55	30	19th	—	—	—	—	—		
1977–78	Primera División	44	22	9	13	60	44	53	5th	W	—	—	—	—		
1978–79	Primera División	44	20	16	8	66	53	56	2nd	—	—	—	—	—		
1979–80	Primera División	46	16	16	14	74	74	48	8th	RU	—	—	CCL	SF		
1980–81	Primera División	38	14	9	15	52	52	37	11th	—	—	—	CCL	2R		
1981–82	Primera División	44	19	13	12	65	48	51	4th	W	—	—	—	—		
1982–83	Primera División	38	12	13	13	47	53	37	9th	—	—	—	—	—		
1983–84	Primera División	40	15	12	13	56	61	42	9th	QF	—	—	CCL	2R		
1984–85	Primera División	38	13	9	16	41	45	35	12th	—	—	—	—	—		
PRODE 85	Primera División	8	1	2	5	8	13	4	5th	—	—	—	—	—		
Mexico 86	Primera División	18	3	8	7	19	25	14	9th	—	—	—	—	—		
1986–87	Primera División	42	15	16	11	61	57	61	5th	QF	—	—	—	—		
1987–88	Primera División	38	12	8	18	51	67	44	15th	—	—	—	—	—		
1988–89	Primera División	38	10	12	16	30	61	42	13th	—	COPAMX	GS	—	—		
1989–90	Primera División	40	15	12	13	66	69	57	6th	QF	COPAMX	RU	—	—		
1990–91	Primera División	38	12	14	12	46	48	50	12th	—	—	—	—	—		
1991–92	Primera División	38	14	11	13	53	51	53	11th	—	COPAMX	GS	—	—		
1992–93	Primera División	42	14	16	12	61	62	58	8th	QF	—	—	—	—		
1993–94	Primera División	38	8	16	14	36	56	40	17th	—	—	—	—	—		
1994–95	Primera División	36	7	10	19	34	50	31	18th	—	COPAMX	R16	—	—		
1995–96	Primera División	36	12	14	10	39	40	50	10th	QF	COPAMX	W	—	—		
Invierno 1996	Liga de Ascenso	22	14	4	4	44	16	46	1st	W	COPAMX	SF	—	—		
Verano 1997	Liga de Ascenso	22	13	6	3	54	23	45	2nd	W	COPAMX	SF	—	—		
Invierno 1997	Primera División	17	5	3	9	20	26	18	15th	—	—	—	—	—		
Verano 1998	Primera División	17	7	2	8	15	22	23	10th	—	—	—	—	—		
Invierno 1998	Primera División	17	5	7	5	30	28	22	9th	—	—	—	—	—		
Verano 1999	Primera División	17	7	2	8	34	32	23	10th	—	—	—	—	—		
Invierno 1999	Primera División	17	5	7	5	27	23	22	9th	—	—	—	—	—		
Verano 2000	Primera División	17	5	7	5	25	22	22	10th	—	—	—	—	—		
Invierno 2000	Primera División	17	6	6	5	23	23	24	11th	—	—	—	—	—		
Verano 2001	Primera División	19	7	7	5	26	18	28	4th	QF	—	—	—	—		
Invierno 2001	Primera División	24	13	5	6	32	17	44	1st	RU	—	—	—	—		
Verano 2002	Primera División	18	7	6	5	25	23	27	10th	—	—	—	—	—		
Apertura 2002	Primera División	19	6	5	8	32	33	23	12th	—	—	—	—	—		
Clausura 2003	Primera División	23	12	5	6	32	30	41	4th	SF	—	—	—	—		
Apertura 2003	Primera División	25	14	5	6	44	34	47	1st	RU	—	—	—	—		
Clausura 2004	Primera División	19	6	5	8	37	39	23	12th	—	—	—	—	—		
Apertura 2004	Primera División	17	6	5	6	37	27	23	8th	—	—	—	—	—		
Clausura 2005	Primera División	19	7	6	6	29	23	27	9th	QF	—	—	CL			
Apertura 2005	Primera División	21	8	4	9	37	31	28	9th	SF	—	—	—	—		
Clausura 2006	Primera División	17	4	9	4	15	15	21	12th	—	—	—	CL			
Apertura 2006	Primera División	17	3	5	9	14	37	14	16th	—	—	—	—	—		
Clausura 2007	Primera División	17	6	5	6	17	20	23	16th	—	—	—	—	—		
Apertura 2007	Primera División	17	4	4	9	16	22	16	16th	—	—	—	—	—		
Clausura 2008	Primera División	17	5	4	8	19	28	19	13th	—	—	—	—	—		
Apertura 2008	Primera División	19	7	7	5	24	18	28	6th	QF	—	—	—	—		
Clausura 2009	Primera División	17	2	8	7	15	26	14	16th	—	—	—	—	—		
Apertura 2009	Primera División	17	5	7	5	23	18	22	10th	—	—	—	—	—		
Bicentenario 2010	Primera División	17	5	4	8	19	26	19	15th	—	—	—	—	—		
Apertura 2010	Primera División	17	6	6	5	24	16	24	9th	—	—	—	—	—		
Clausura 2011	Primera División	19	10	6	3	28	13	36	1st	QF	—	—	—	—		
Apertura 2011	Primera División	23	12	8	3	31	14	44	3rd	W	—	—	—	—		
Clausura 2012	Primera División	21	11	6	4	30	20	39	5th	SF	—	—	CL			
Apertura 2012	Primera División	17	5	6	6	23	18	21	12th	—	—	—	CCL			
Clausura 2013	Primera División	19	10	6	3	31	16	36	1st	QF	—	—	CCL			
Apertura 2013	Primera División	19	6	9	4	26	23	27	8th	QF	COPAMX	QF	—	—		
Clausura 2014	Primera División	17	5	6	6	13	17	21	14th	—	COPAMX	W	—	—		
Apertura 2014	Primera División	23	9	11	3	28	22	38	2nd	RU	COPAMX	SF	—	—		
Clausura 2015	Primera División	19	9	3	7	24	17	30	1st	QF	—	—	CL			
Apertura 2015	Primera División	23	12	5	6	35	21	41	5th	W	—	—	CCL			
Clausura 2016	Primera División	19	7	6	6	32	23	27	8th	QF	—	—	CCL			
Apertura 2016	Primera División	23	11	9	3	34	18	42	3rd	W	—	—	CCL			
Clausura 2017	Primera División	23	11	5	7	39	17	38	7th	RU	—	—	CCL			
Apertura 2017	Primera División	23	12	8	3	37	20	44	2nd	W	COPAMX	GS	—	—		
Clausura 2018	Primera División	19	8	7	4	25	18	31	5th	QF	—	—	CCL			
Apertura 2018	Primera División	19	9	5	5	35	22	32	6th	QF	COPAMX	QF	—	—		
Clausura 2019	Primera División	23	13	7	3	37	19	46	2nd	W	—	—	CCL			
Apertura 2019	Primera División	20	8	8	4	30	19	32	6th	QF	—	—	—	—		
Clausura 2020 (Note: The tournament was left unfinished due to the COVID-19 pandemic.)	Primera División	10	4	2	4	13	10	14	6th	—	—	—	CCL			
Apertura 2020	Primera División	20	8	7	5	31	20	31	6th	QF	—	—	CCL			
Clausura 2021	Primera División	18	7	5	6	19	21	26	10th	R16	—	—	CWC			
Apertura 2021	Primera División	21	9	7	5	31	19	34	4th	SF	—	—	—	—		
Clausura 2022	Primera División	21	11	3	7	31	26	36	2nd	SF	—	—	—	—		
Apertura 2022	Primera División	20	11	3	6	28	16	36	5th	QF	—	—	—	—		
Clausura 2023	Primera División	24	11	6	7	31	24	39	7th	W	—	—	CCL			
Apertura 2023	Primera División	23	10	9	4	40	25	39	3rd	RU	—	—	LCup			
Clausura 2024	Primera División	19	9	5	5	36	26	32	5th	QF	—	—	CCL			
Apertura 2024	Primera División	19	10	5	4	25	18	34	3rd	QF	—	—	LCup			
Clausura 2025	Primera División	21	10	6	5	27	20	36	4th	SF	—	—	CCL			
Apertura 2025	Primera División	23	12	8	3	45	23	44	2nd	RU	—	—	CCL			
Clausura 2026	Primera División															
