= Roberto Ruiz Esparza =

Mexican footballer (born 1965)

Personal information
- Full name: José Roberto Ruiz Esparza Oruña
- Date of birth: 16 January 1965 (age 61)
- Place of birth: Puebla, Mexico
- Height: 1.79 m (5 ft 10 in)
- Position: Defender

Senior career*
Years	Team	Apps	(Gls)
1983–1993	Puebla	262	(12)
1992–1993	→ Veracruz (loan)	19	(0)
1994–1995	Tigres UANL	33	(2)
1996–1997	Necaxa	24	(0)
1998	Celaya	43	(4)
1999–2001	Puebla	108	(5)

International career
1987–1993	Mexico	22	(0)
- * Club domestic league appearances and goals

José Roberto Ruiz Esparza Oruña (born 16 January 1965) is a Mexican former professional footballer who played as a defender.

== Career ==
He was born in the city of Puebla in the state of Puebla. His debut was on 8 May 1984 in a match against Monterrey (Puebla 5 Monterrey 3 ) he played for his home team Puebla FC for more than 15 years. He also played with clubs as Tigres U.A.N.L. from 1994 to 1995, Necaxa, Atlético Celaya. He is remembered with Puebla FC as the captain that was defending the club's colors for many years.

He is now an active member of the political party National Action Party (PAN). In the 2003 mid-terms he was elected to the Chamber of Deputies to represent Puebla's 6th district.
