= Rodolfo Navarro =

Mexican footballer and manager (born 1974)

Personal information
- Date of birth: 10 September 1974 (age 52)
- Place of birth: Guadalajara, Mexico
- Height: 1.69 m (5 ft 7 in)
- Position: Defender

Senior career*
Years	Team	Apps	(Gls)
1991–1992	Tecos		
1993–1995	Atlas		
1995–1997	León		
1997–1998	UANL Tigres		
1998–1999	Celaya		
1999–2000	UANL Tigres		
2000–2004	Tecos	64	(2)

Managerial career
- Celaya (assistant)
- * Club domestic league appearances and goals

Rodolfo "Fati" Navarro Rodríguez (born 10 September 1974) is a Mexican football manager and former player.
