= Luis Fernando Soto =

Mexican footballer and manager (born 1971)

Personal information
- Full name: Luis Fernando Soto Garduño
- Date of birth: 10 March 1971 (age 55)
- Place of birth: Minatitlán, Veracruz, Mexico
- Height: 1.68 m (5 ft 6 in)
- Position: Midfielder

Team information
- Current team: Atlético Celaya (manager)

Senior career*
Years	Team	Apps	(Gls)
1991–1996	Cruz Azul	13	(3)
1996–2000	Atlético Celaya	104	(25)
2000–2001	Santos Laguna	33	(3)
2001–2002	Atlético Celaya	17	(7)
2002	Santos Laguna	3	(0)
2003	Celaya	5	(4)
2003	San Luis	12	(1)
2005	BUAP	13	(1)

International career^{‡}
1999	Mexico	3	(0)

Managerial career
- 2010–2012: Celaya (assistant)
- 2013: Veracruz (assistant)
- 2013–2014: Atlético San Luis (assistant)
- 2014–2015: Necaxa (assistant)
- 2018: Tapachula (assistant)
- 2019: Tapachula
- 2023: Querétaro Reserves and Academy
- 2023–2024: Irapuato
- 2025–2026: Celaya
- 2026–: Atlético Celaya
- * Club domestic league appearances and goals as of August 1, 2023 ‡ National team caps and goals as of August 1, 2023

Luis Fernando Soto Garduño (born 10 March 1971) is a former Mexican professional footballer who played as a midfielder.

== Club career ==
He debuted with Cruz Azul on 2 February 1992. Due to a large number of injuries he had very few appearances and was ultimately transferred to Atlético Celaya in 1996; With the "cajeteros" he played 8 tournaments, achieving ownership during this time. He moved to Santos Laguna in 2000 and won the Summer 2001 championship, played one year with Santos, returned to Celaya during the 2001–02 season and returned to Santos again. In 2003 he moved to the Cajeteros de Celaya of the First Division A, after a tournament he went to the San Luis F.C. He lasted a year without a team and returned in 2005 to finish his career with the Lobos BUAP.

== International career ==
In October 1999 he participated in three friendly matches for the Mexican national soccer team against the teams of Paraguay (1:0 loss), Colombia (0:0) and Ecuador (0:0).

== Managerial career ==
In 2010 he started as a prop for Celaya, starting with Apertura 2011 he became the team's technical assistant. In 2013 he was an assistant in the Tiburones Rojos de Veracruz and the second semester he was in Atlético San Luis. In 2018, Soto was named the head coach of Tapachula. In 2023, Soto was appointed as manager of Irapuato.
