= Omar Arellano (footballer, born 1967) =

Mexican footballer

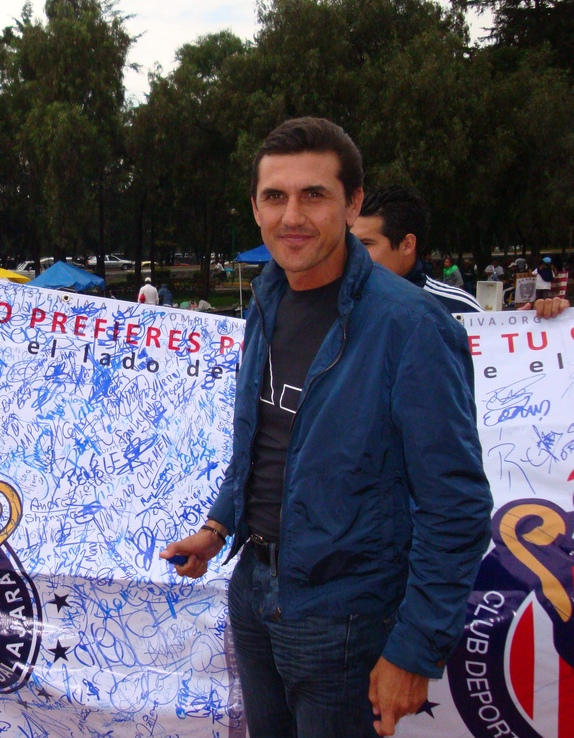

Personal information
- Full name: Omar Arellano Nuño
- Date of birth: 29 May 1967 (age 59)
- Place of birth: Tampico, Tamaulipas, Mexico
- Height: 1.79 m (5 ft 10 in)
- Position: Midfielder

Team information
- Current team: C.D. Marquense (Manager)

Senior career*
Years	Team	Apps	(Gls)
1985–1996	Guadalajara	196	(19)
1995–1998	Tigres UANL	64	(3)
1999–2001	León	7	(1)
2001–2002	Pachuca	22	(0)

International career
1989	Mexico	1	(0)

Managerial career
- 2003: Pachuca Reserves (Assistant)
- 2005–2006: Santos Laguna (Assistant)
- 2006: Chivas San Rafael
- 2007: Tapatío
- 2007–2008: Atletico de Madrid (Assistant)
- 2009: Guadalajara (Assistant)
- 2009: Guadalajara
- 2009–2010: Necaxa
- 2011–2012: Veracruz
- 2013: UAT
- 2016–2018: Guadalajara Premier
- 2019–2020: Irapuato
- 2020–2022: Chapulineros de Oaxaca
- 2023: Saltillo
- 2024–2025: Dragones de Oaxaca
- 2026–: C.D. Marquense
- * Club domestic league appearances and goals

Omar Arellano Nuño (born 29 May 1967) is a Mexican former professional footballer who played as a midfielder and current manager. He played for Tigres UANL during the 1995-96 season.

As of April 2009 he was the manager at Chivas Guadalajara, and he managed Necaxa in 2010.
