= Fabián Peña =

Mexican footballer (born 1973)

Personal information
- Full name: Fabián Peña González
- Date of birth: 19 June 1973 (age 53)
- Place of birth: Nuevo Laredo, Mexico
- Height: 1.74 m (5 ft 9 in)
- Position: Midfielder

Senior career*
Years	Team	Apps	(Gls)
1993–2000	UANL Tigres	143	(14)
2000–2006	Necaxa	188	(18)
2002	→ CF Monterrey (loan)	8	(0)
2006–2007	Club América	14	(0)
2007–2009	Puebla F.C.	11	(0)
- * Club domestic league appearances and goals

Fabián Peña González (born 19 June 1973) is a Mexican former footballer who played as a midfielder.

A product of the Tigres UANL youth system, playing his debut during the 1995-96 season, Peña spent a total of six years at the club before a move to Mexico City-based Necaxa at the turn of the 21st century. After a brief return to Monterrey (this time with UANL Tigres' chief rivals - CF Monterrey) in 2002, Peña returned to Necaxa, which had since found a new home in Aguascalientes. In 2006, the 33-year-old made a high-profile move to Necaxa's sister club, Club América. Peña was able to join the ten-time league champion side prior to the Apertura 2006 season due to the departures of midfielders Pável Pardo and Francisco Torres to Germany's VfB Stuttgart and Santos Laguna, respectively.
