= Martín Boasso =

Argentine footballer

Personal information
- Full name: Martín Mariano Boasso Danielle
- Date of birth: April 11, 1975 (age 51)
- Place of birth: El Trebol, Argentina
- Height: 1.71 m (5 ft 7 in)
- Position: Striker

Senior career*
Years	Team	Apps	(Gls)
1995–1998	Rosario Central	33	(2)
1998	Gimnasia de Jujuy	16	(2)
1999–2000	Santos	29	(8)
2001	Unión de Santa Fe	2	(0)
2001	Irapuato	9	(0)
2001–2002	Pachuca	7	(0)
2003	Tecos	5	(0)
2004–2006	FAS	?	(?)
- * Club domestic league appearances and goals

Martín Mariano Boasso Danielle (born 11 April 1975 in El Trebol, Santa Fe) is an Argentine naturalized Mexican footballer.
