= Javier Lozano (footballer) =

Mexican footballer (born 1971)

Personal information
- Full name: Javier Lozano Chavira
- Date of birth: 9 February 1971 (age 55)
- Place of birth: Monterrey, Mexico
- Height: 1.71 m (5 ft 7 1/2 in)
- Position: Midfielder

Senior career*
Years	Team	Apps	(Gls)
1992–1998	Tigres UANL	111	(28)
1999–2002	Morelia	113	(13)
2003	CD Vista Hermosa	16	(1)

International career
1995–2001	Mexico	10	(2)
- * Club domestic league appearances and goals

Javier Lozano Chavira (born 9 February 1971) is a Mexican former professional footballer. He played for Tigres UANL and Monarcas Morelia as a midfielder. He is nicknamed "El Pastor", which means "The Shepherd". He wore the number 22 shirt for both teams.

He debuted with Tigres in 1992. His most notable season was 1995–96, when he scored 12 goals. That year, Tigres fought to avoid relegation to the Primera División A. Though Tigres qualified to the playoffs at the end of the regular season, the Primera Division's use of a percentage system for relegation, in which the team with the worst percentage in three years (instead of the worst team of a season) is relegated, meant Tigres would still be dropping to the Primera División A. The crisis led to the privatization of the team.

After privatization, Tigres reinforced the team to fight for promotion, which was achieved within the year. "El Pastor" Lozano participated fully with the team. He played in First Division with Tigres the following season as well.

However, overweight issues led to his separation of the team. He trained with Necaxa for a short period, but was never able to regain his condition.

In 1999, he returned to play with Morelia for 6 seasons, in which he scored a total of 13 goals. He was champion with Morelia in 2000 and runner-up in 2002.

== Honours ==
UANL

- Primera División A: Invierno 1996, Verano 1997
- Copa México: 1995–96

Morelia

- Mexican Primera División: Invierno 2000

Mexico

- CONCACAF Gold Cup: 1998

== Career statistics ==
=== International goals ===
Scores and results list Mexico's goal tally first.

Goal	Date	Venue	Opponent	Score	Result	Competition
1.	11 October 1995	Rose Bowl, Pasadena, United States	Saudi Arabia	2–1	2–1	Friendly
2.	1 July 2000	3Com Park at Candlestick, San Francisco, United States	El Salvador	1–0	3–0	Friendly
