= Martín Ubaldi =

Argentine footballer

Personal information
- Full name: Martín Felix Ubaldi
- Date of birth: 11 November 1969 (age 56)
- Place of birth: Buenos Aires, Argentina
- Height: 1.71 m (5 ft 7 in)
- Position: Forward

Senior career*
Years	Team	Apps	(Gls)
1987–1992	Club Atlético Independiente		
1992–1995	Atlas		
1995–1996	UANL		
1996–1998	Atlante		
1999–2000	Puebla		
2000	UNAM		
2001	Toros Neza		
- * Club domestic league appearances and goals as of 22 January 2009

Martín Félix Ubaldi (11 November 1969) is an Argentine former football striker.

He played with Club Atlético Independiente, Atlas, Tigres UANL during the 1995-96 season, Atlante, Puebla, UNAM and Toros Neza. His nickname was El Motorcito (The Little Engine).
