= Alfredo Murguía =

Mexican footballer and manager (born 1969)

Personal information
- Full name: José Alfredo Murguía Sosa
- Date of birth: 29 May 1969 (age 57)
- Place of birth: León, Guanajuato, Mexico
- Height: 1.77 m (5 ft 9 1/2 in)
- Position: Defender

Team information
- Current team: León U-21 (Manager)

Senior career*
Years	Team	Apps	(Gls)
1990–1995	León	171	(2)
1995–1998	UANL	73	(1)
2000–2001	León	5	(0)

Managerial career
- 2008–2011: Atlético Bajío
- 2011–2012: Cachorros León
- 2012–2015: León (academy)
- 2015–2018: León Premier
- 2018–: León (academy)
- * Club domestic league appearances and goals

José Alfredo Murguía Sosa (born May 29, 1969) is a Mexican football manager and former player. He played for Tigres UANL during the 1995-96 season.
