= Pietro Maiellaro =

Italian footballer and manager

Personal information
- Date of birth: 29 September 1963 (age 63)
- Place of birth: Candela, Italy
- Height: 1.82 m (6 ft 0 in)
- Position: Midfielder

Youth career
- Lucera

Senior career*
Years	Team	Apps	(Gls)
1980–1981	Lucera	24	(4)
1981–1982	Avellino	0	(0)
1982–1983	→Varese	17	(1)
1983–1984	Avellino	6	(0)
1984–1985	Palermo	29	(2)
1985–1987	Taranto	57	(10)
1987–1991	Bari	119	(26)
1991–1992	Fiorentina	25	(4)
1992–1993	Venezia	19	(1)
1993–1994	Cosenza	31	(7)
1994–1995	Palermo	30	(9)
1995–1996	UANL Tigres	8	(0)
1996–1997	Benevento	24	(1)
1997-1999	Campobasso	48	(12)

Managerial career
- 2004–2005: Lucera
- 2005–2006: Noicattaro
- 2006–2007: Barletta
- * Club domestic league appearances and goals as of 2007-10-02

Pietro Maiellaro (born 29 September 1963) is an Italian former football player and current manager. Gifted with good technique, throughout his footballing career he played as a midfielder, as either a central or attacking midfielder, for several Italian clubs, and is best known for his four-year spell with Bari.

== Playing career ==
After spending his youth career with Lucera, Maiellaro was promoted to the first team during the 1980–81 season when Avellino bought him and later sent him on loan to Varese. He later played for various teams, such as well as Palermo and Taranto, before moving to Bari in 1987.

He is best known for his four-year stay at Bari, scoring 26 goals (13 in Serie B and 13 in Serie A) with the biancorossi. One of his most memorable strikes was a 50-yard looping shot from inside the centre circle which sneaked in just under the bar, much to the horror of Bologna goalkeeper Gianluigi Valleriani, on 24 March 1991. Maiellaro earned a reputation as an enormously talented playmaker, displaying exceptional ball skills and scoring outstanding goals. He later moved to A.C. Fiorentina, where he was given the number 10 shirt, although he was not able to repeat his early successes, and faced competition from several other players in his role.

Afterwards, he played for Palermo and Cosenza. He played for Tigres UANL during the 1995–96 season, before returning in Italy in played for Benevento and Campobasso; with this team begam to coac.

== Coaching career ==
Maiellaro began his coaching career as head coach of his hometown club Lucera, and then for Noicattaro. He trained Barletta, a leading Serie D team with the goal of earning promotion to the professional Serie C2 league, until 9 January 2007, when he was fired. He currently coaches the youth team of A.S. Bari.
