= Marco Antonio Ruiz =

Mexican footballer (born 1969)

Personal information
- Full name: Marco Antonio Ruiz García
- Date of birth: 12 July 1969 (age 57)
- Place of birth: Tampico, Tamaulipas, Mexico
- Height: 1.70 m (5 ft 7 in)
- Position: Midfielder

Senior career*
Years	Team	Apps	(Gls)
1986–1990	Tampico Madero	71	(9)
1991–1998	UANL	157	(15)
1992–1993	→ Querétaro (loan)	26	(1)
1995	→ Pachuca (loan)	14	(2)
1998–2001	Guadalajara	106	(10)
2002–2004	UANL	73	(4)
2005	San Luis	13	(1)

International career
2000–2001	Mexico	16	(1)

Managerial career
- 2009: Chiapas (assistant)
- 2013–2014: Guadalajara (assistant)
- 2015–2016: Mexico U15
- 2016–2018: Mexico U20
- 2018: Mexico U21
- 2018–2020: Mexico U17
- 2020–2023: UANL (assistant)
- 2023: UANL
- 2025–2026: Jaiba Brava
Medal record
Men's football
Representing Mexico (as manager)
FIFA U-17 World Cup
Runner-up	2019
- * Club domestic league appearances and goals

Marco Antonio Ruíz García (born 12 July 1969) is a Mexican football head coach and former player.

A midfielder, he appeared in 16 matches for the Mexico national team and was a member of the Mexico squad at the 2001 FIFA Confederations Cup, where he played in all three matches.

== Career ==
Nicknamed "Chima," Ruiz made his debut in 1986, with Tampico Madero "Jaiba Brava", where he received a fractured tibia and fibula from Fernando Quirarte in a match between Tampico Madero Vs U.de.G. . He played for several years during the 1990s with Tigres (a relegation included during the 1995-96 season), but his career did not really shine until he joined Guadalajara in 1998. He became a frequent starter with Chivas as a left-sided attacking midfielder, small in stature but an eager dribbler. He helped Guadalajara reach the final of the Apertura championship in 1998, which ended in a loss to Necaxa. Although the club's fortunes soon entered a period of decline, Ruiz remained with Chivas for three more years until he rejoined Tigres in 2002. His final top-flight season came in the Apertura 2004 campaign.

Ruiz also represented the Mexico national team in international play. A late bloomer on the world stage, Ruiz made his international debut at the age of 31 against Ecuador on 20 September 2000, in which he scored a goal. His international career coincided entirely with the coaching tenure of Enrique Meza, who preferred him at the position of left wingback. Mexico's results dipped during the qualifying campaign for the 2002 FIFA World Cup, culminating in elimination from the 2001 FIFA Confederations Cup and a home defeat against Costa Rica. Meza came under intense pressure and was eventually dismissed in June 2001, and Ruiz was never capped again by any subsequent Mexico coaches. Ruiz's last international appearance came in a 3-1 defeat against Honduras in a World Cup qualifying match on 20 June 2001.

== Career statistics ==
Scores and results list Mexico's goal tally first.

Goal	Date	Venue	Opponent	Score	Result	Competition
1.	20 September 2000	Qualcomm Stadium, San Diego, United States	Ecuador	2–0	2–0	Friendly

== Honours ==
=== Manager ===
Mexico U17

- FIFA U-17 World Cup runner-up: 2019
