= Sead Seferović =

Bosnian footballer (born 1970)

Personal information
- Date of birth: 28 April 1970 (age 56)
- Place of birth: Bugojno, SFR Yugoslavia
- Position: Midfielder

Youth career
- Iskra Bugojno

Senior career*
Years	Team	Apps	(Gls)
1990-1991	Iskra Bugojno	19	(2)
1991–1992	Mogren	16	(3)
1993	Pazinka	11	(3)
1993–1994	Neuchâtel Xamax	18	(4)
1995	Hajduk Split	5	(0)
1995–1996	Tigres UANL	16	(3)
1996–1998	Rijeka	42	(3)
1998–2001	Iskra Bugojno		
2001–2003	Željezničar	26	(8)

International career
2001	Bosnia and Herzegovina	5	(1)
2001	Bosnia and Herzegovina XI	3	(0)

Managerial career
- 2013-2014: Iskra Bugojno
- 2014-2016: Iskra Bugojno
- * Club domestic league appearances and goals

Sead Seferović (born 28 April 1970) is a Bosnian former professional footballer who played as a midfielder.

== Club career ==
During his professional career he spent four seasons in Croatia's Prva HNL and also played in Switzerland and Mexico with Tigres UANL during the 1995-96 season. He retired from professional football in 2003, after receiving a one-year suspension for doping in 2002. Following his retirement from professional football, he took on various managerial roles with his hometown club Iskra Bugojno.

He played with FK Mogren in the 1991–92 Yugoslav Second League, and first half of the 1992–93 First League of FR Yugoslavia.

== International career ==
Seferović made his debut for Bosnia and Herzegovina in a January 2001 Sahara Millennium Cup match against Bangladesh and has earned a total of 8 caps (3 unofficial), scoring 1 goal. His final international was an August 2001 LG Cup match against Iran.

== Career statistics ==
Scores and results list Bosnia and Herzegovina's goal tally first.
As of match played 18 November 2020.

Goal	Date	Venue	Opponent	Score	Result	Competition
1.	22 July 2001	Stadion pod Borićima, Bihać, Bosnia and Herzegovina	Iran	2–0	2–2	Friendly
