= Miguel Fuentes (Mexican footballer) =

Mexican footballer (born 1971)

Personal information
- Full name: Miguel de Jesús Fuentes Razo
- Date of birth: 29 September 1971 (age 55)
- Place of birth: Guadalajara, Jalisco, Mexico
- Position: Goalkeeper

Youth career
- Atlas

Senior career*
Years	Team	Apps	(Gls)
1996	Pachuca	1	(0)
1997–2001	Celaya	53	(0)
1999	→ Leon (Loan)	6	(0)
2002–2005	Morelia	19	(0)
Total		79	(0)

International career
1991	Mexico U20	3	(0)

Managerial career
- 2006–2007: Atlas (assistant)
- 2008: Celaya (assistant)
- 2009–2012: Celaya
- 2012–2013: Veracruz
- 2013–2014: Atlético San Luis
- 2014–2015: Necaxa
- 2016: Lobos BUAP
- 2016–2018: FC Juárez
- 2018–2019: Tampico Madero
- 2019–2021: Mexico U23 (assistant)
- 2022: Necaxa (assistant)
- 2023–2024: UANL (assistant)
- 2025: Atlante
- * Club domestic league appearances and goals

Miguel de Jesús Fuentes Razo (born 29 September 1971) is a Mexican professional football coach and a former goalkeeper.

== Club career ==
He played for Tigres UANL during the 1995-96 season.

== International career ==
He was a member of the Mexico national football team competing at the 1992 Summer Olympics in Barcelona, Spain. Miguel Fuentes was a squad member at the 1991 FIFA World Youth Championship held in Portugal, where he played three games.
