= Sergio Almaguer =

Mexican footballer (born 1969)

Personal information
- Full name: Sergio Almaguer Treviño
- Date of birth: 16 May 1969 (age 57)
- Place of birth: Monterrey, Nuevo León, Mexico
- Height: 1.83 m (6 ft 0 in)
- Position: Centre-back

Team information
- Current team: Tijuana (assistant)

Senior career*
Years	Team	Apps	(Gls)
1987–1988	Ángeles	27	(3)
1988–1990	Puebla	15	(1)
1990–1991	Querétaro	35	(11)
1991–1994	Tigres UANL	93	(22)
1994–1995	UAT	29	(8)
1995–1996	Tigres UANL	31	(8)
1996–1997	Puebla	35	(2)
1997–2001	Necaxa	136	(13)
2001–2003	Cruz Azul	37	(1)
2002–2003	→ Galatasaray (loan)	7	(0)
2003–2005	Chiapas	55	(4)
Total		497	(73)

International career
1991–2000	Mexico	17	(0)

Managerial career
- 2006: América (assistant)
- 2008: Jaguares
- 2013–2015: Mexico U20
- 2016–2017: Querétaro (assistant)
- 2019–2020: Querétaro (assistant)
- 2020–2021: Guadalajara (assistant)
- 2022–2023: Monterrey (assistant)
- 2024–2025: Mazatlán (Assistant)
- 2025: Pachuca (assistant)}
- 2026–: Tijuana (assistant)
Medal record
Representing Mexico
Third place	Copa America	1999 Paraguay
Representing Mexico (as manager)
First place	CONCACAF U-20 Championship	2013 Mexico
- * Club domestic league appearances and goals

Sergio Almaguer Treviño (born 16 May 1969) is a Mexican former professional footballer who played as a centre-back, who is the current assistant manager of Liga MX club Monterrey. Almaguer made his professional debut with the former Mexico club Ángeles de Puebla on May 16, 1987. Almaguer played with nine different clubs in Mexico and Turkey and also capped for the Mexico national team.

== Career ==
Almaguer started his career with former club Ángeles de Puebla, where he played 27 games and scored three goals. After one season with Angeles he transferred to Puebla, spending three seasons with the team. After the 1989–90 season Almaguer transferred to Querétaro, he appeared in 35 games and scored 11 goals. Between 1991 and 1996 Almaguer played for Tigres UANL (included the relegation during the 1995-96 season), he also played on loan for Correcaminos UAT for the 1994–95 season. For the Invierno 1996 season turned to a defender after playing as a striker for the first nine years of his career. In his first season playing at defense, Almaguer played with Puebla, he played in 35 games and scored just two goals.

After playing with Puebla, Almaguer was transferred to Necaxa for the Invierno 1997 season. His tenure with Necaxa was successful, he was champion in the Invierno 1998 season and won the 1999 CONCACAF Champions' Cup. After four years playing with Necaxa he signed with Cruz Azul where he spent two years appearing in 37 games. He was loaned to Galatasaray of the Turkey Süper Lig for one year, he only appeared in seven league matches, three UEFA Champions League matches and scored no goals. After half a season in Turkey he returned to Mexico, he signed with Chiapas. On June 28, 2005, Almaguer announced his retirement ending his 18-year career.

== Coaching career ==
On February 20, 2008, Almaguer was named coach of his former team, Jaguares de Chiapas. Almaguer made his debut three days later against Tecos UAG, Jaguares won 2–0. He led the team to six victories, two draws and three losses to end the season. In the first round of the postseason, Jaguares defeated Cruz Azul 1–0 in the first leg. In the second leg Cruz Azul won 2–1 and won on aggregate 2–2 because Cruz Azul was a higher seed. After losing five of the first 10 games of the Apertura season Jaguares fired Almaguer.

=== Mexico U-17 ===
On July 26, 2010, Almaguer coached his first Mexico's U-17 game against Ireland's U-17, resulting in a 1–1 draw.

=== Mexico U-20 ===
In January 2015, Almaguer won the 2015 CONCACAF U-20 Championship in Jamaica with the Mexico U-20 team also qualifying them for the 2015 FIFA U-20 World Cup in New Zealand. In December 2015, Almaguer was released from his duties with the Mexico U-20 national team.

== Managerial statistics ==
=== Managerial statistics ===
As of 26 November 2020

Team	Nat	From	To	Record							
Team	Nat	From	To	G	W	D	L	GF	GA	GD	Win %
Mexico U-20	(Mexico)	2013	2015	24	15	2	7	58	27	+31	62.50

== Honours ==
=== Player ===
Puebla

- Mexican Primera División: 1989–90
- Copa México: 1989–90
- Campeón de Campeones: 1990

Tigres UANL

- Copa México: 1995–96

Necaxa

- Mexican Primera División: Invierno 1998
- CONCACAF Champions' Cup: 1999

Mexico

- Copa América third place: 1999

=== Manager ===
Mexico U20

- CONCACAF U-20 Championship: 2013, 2015
