= Jorge Campos (footballer, born 1979) =

Mexican footballer and manager

Personal information
- Full name: Jorge Alberto Campos Valadéz
- Date of birth: 24 April 1979 (age 47)
- Place of birth: Torreón, Coahuila, Mexico
- Height: 1.76 m (5 ft 9 in)
- Position: Midfielder

Team information
- Current team: Santos Laguna U-19 (Manager)

Senior career*
Years	Team	Apps	(Gls)
1997–2007	Santos Laguna	204	(5)
2008	Tiburones Rojos de Coatzacoalcos	13	(0)
2009	Tijuana	11	(0)
2009–2010	Veracruz	19	(1)
2010–2011	Orizaba	20	(0)
2011–2012	La Piedad	26	(1)
2012–2013	Mérida	24	(1)

Managerial career
- 2014–2015: San Isidro Laguna (Assistant)
- 2018–2019: Santos Laguna Reserves and Academy
- 2020–2021: Santos Laguna (women) (Assistant)
- 2021–2023: Santos Laguna (women)
- 2023–: Santos Laguna Reserves and Academy
- * Club domestic league appearances and goals

Jorge Alberto Campos Valadéz (Note: In this Spanish name, the first or paternal surname is Campos and the second or maternal family name is Valadéz.) (born 24 April 1979) is a Mexican football manager and former player.
