= Guillermo Hernández (footballer, born 1971) =

Mexican footballer and manager (born 1971)

Personal information
- Full name: Guillermo Ricardo Hernández Medina
- Date of birth: 18 February 1971 (age 55)
- Place of birth: Guadalajara, Jalisco, Mexico
- Position: Defender

Senior career*
Years	Team	Apps	(Gls)
1990–1997	Guadalajara	94	(7)
1997–1998	Veracruz	24	(2)
1998–2000	UAG	39	(0)
2000–2001	UAT	12	(0)
2001–2002	UAG		
2002–2003	Querétaro		

International career
1995–1996	Mexico	2	(0)

Managerial career
- 2003: Querétaro (Assistant)
- 2004: Trotamundos Tijuana (Assistant)
- 2005: Sinaloa (Assistant)
- 2006: Tijuana
- 2008: Sinaloa
- 2010: Necaxa (Assistant)
- 2011: Veracruz (Assistant)
- 2011: Irapuato (Assistant)
- 2013: Atlante (Assistant)
- 2014: Nayarit (Assistant)
- 2015: Zacatepec (Assistant)
- 2015–2016: Zacatecas (Assistant)
- 2016–2017: UdeG (Assistant)
- 2017: CAFESSA
- 2021–2022: Tapatío (Assistant)
- 2022: Guadalajara (Assistant)
- * Club domestic league appearances and goals

Guillermo Ricardo Hernández Medina (Note: In this Spanish name, the first or paternal surname is Hernández and the second or maternal family name is Medina.) (born 18 February 1971) is a Mexican football manager and former player.
