= Omar Avilán =

Mexican footballer (born 1977)

Personal information
- Full name: Omar Alejandro Avilán Mendoza
- Date of birth: 29 April 1977 (age 49)
- Place of birth: Guadalajara, Mexico
- Height: 1.78 m (5 ft 10 in)
- Position: Midfielder

Team information
- Current team: Gallos Viejos (Manager)

Senior career*
Years	Team	Apps	(Gls)
1995–1997	Atlas	57	(5)
1998–1999	Toros Neza	19	(2)
1999–2004	Monterrey	123	(15)
2004–2005	Puebla	27	(2)
2006	Coyotes de Sonora	18	(5)
2006–2007	Gallos Blancos	2	(0)

International career
1997	Mexico	1	(0)

Managerial career
- 2015–2016: Gallos Viejos
- 2020 –: Gallos Viejos
- * Club domestic league appearances and goals

Omar Alejandro Avilán Mendoza (Note: In this Spanish name, the first or paternal surname is Avilán and the second or maternal family name is Mendoza.) (born 29 April 1977) is a Mexican former footballer who played as a midfielder.

== Club career ==
Born in Guadalajara, Jalisco, Avilán made his professional debut with Club Atlas in February 1995. He joined Toros Neza for one year in 1998, and then moved to C.F. Monterrey. He would finish his career with stints at Puebla F.C. and Querétaro F.C.

== International career ==
Avilán made one appearance for the Mexico national football team, entering as a second-half substitute in a friendly against Ecuador on 5 February 1997.
