= Estadio Miguel Alemán Valdés =

Multi-use stadium in Celaya. Mexico

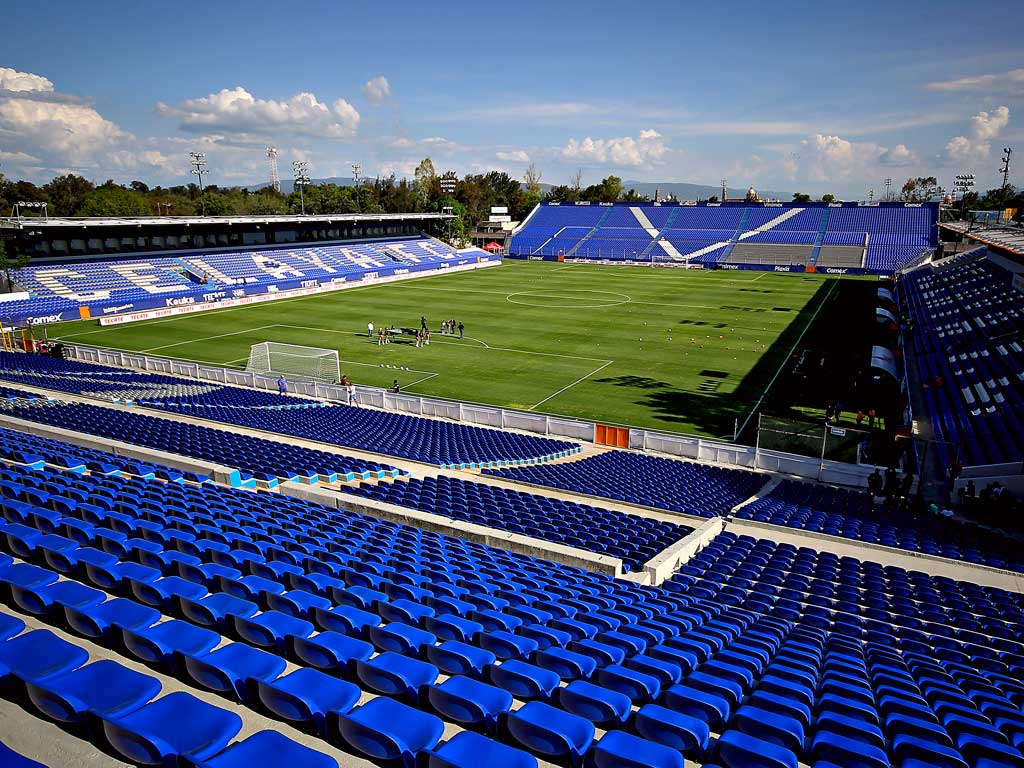
- Interactive map of Estadio Miguel Alemán Valdés
- Full name: Estadio Miguel Alemán Valdés
- Location: Celaya, Guanajuato, Mexico
- Coordinates: 20°32′6″N 100°49′6″W
- Owner: City of Celaya
- Operator: Club Celaya
- Capacity: 23,182
- Surface: Grass

Construction
- Opened: 1954
- Renovated: 2016

Tenants
- Club Celaya; Lobos ULMX

The Estadio Miguel Alemán Valdés is a multi-use stadium in Celaya, Guanajuato. Mexico. It is currently used mostly for football matches and is the home stadium of Club Celaya. The stadium holds 23,369 people and opened in 1954.

It is named for Miguel Alemán Valdés, President of the Republic from 1946 to 1952.

On 2 June 2016, it was announced that the stadium was renamed in honour of former Real Madrid player Emilio Butragueño, who played the last three years of his career for Atlético Celaya, it was later denied by Ramón Lemus Muñoz, the Municipal president of Celaya.
