= Atlético Celaya =

Mexican football club

- Full name: Club Atlético Celaya
- Nickname: Toros (Bulls)
- Founded: 1994; 32 years ago 23 July 2026; 3 months ago (refounded)
- Ground: Estadio Miguel Alemán Valdés
- Capacity: 23,182
- Owner: ICEM Sports
- Chairman: Cristian Ríos
- Manager: Luis Fernando Soto
- League: Liga Premier (Primera Premier)
- 2026–27: TBD
Home colours	Away colours

Club Atlético Celaya is a professional football club based in Celaya, Guanajuato. The club competes in Liga Premier (Primera Premier), the third level of Mexican football, and plays its home matches at Estadio Miguel Alemán Valdés. Founded in 1994, after the merger of Atlético Cuernavaca, Escuadra Celeste de Celaya and Atlético Español (not the defunct Atlético Español F.C.). The franchise was moved to Xochitepec and dissolved in 2003, and later the club was refounded in 2026.

== History ==
All merging clubs have brought a piece of their old identity into the new formed club: from Atlético Cuernavaca were taken the name to the new club (although its name is also identical with former Atlético Español), from Celeste de Celaya were taken their light blue colors and from Atlético Español the mascot, the bull, which has also given the new team their nickname toros (bulls).

Atlético Celaya has taken the second-division position of their predecessors and has immediately reached the top-level. The first year in Primera División was also their most successful season ever. First, they could win their group and in the play-offs they could make their way up to the finals in which they lost only due to the away-goal-rule after playing 1–1 and 0–0 with Necaxa.

But from now on the club finds itself in lower positions in the league. They had also financial problems which led to the sale of their Primera División-license to an industrialist from Morelos in 2003. The franchise was moved to Xochitepec and becoming Colibríes de Morelos. At the same time when Atlético Celaya was dissolved, their older city neighbour Celaya F.C. was revived as Club Celaya by acquiring the franchise of C.F. La Piedad.

On 23 July 2026, the club was refounded to participate in the Liga Premier, after the franchise of Celaya F.C. was moved to Veracruz to ensure the continuity of professional football in Celaya, recovering the name of the city's historic club.

== Crest and colours ==
The club's original colors

in the 1950s were red and white. In the late 1980s and early 1990s, the club started using black and white with a topical v shape across the chest for home games and a black stripe shirt for away games, which they still use to this date.

=== Colours ===
First kit evolution

1997 Home	1997 Away	2002 – home

== Personnel ==
=== Management ===
Position	Staff
Chairman	(Mexico) Cristian Ríos
Director of football	TBA

Source: Artículo 7

=== Coaching staff ===
Position	Staff
Manager	(Mexico) Luis Fernando Soto
Assistant managers	(Mexico) Rafael Bautista
Fitness coach	(Mexico) Bernardino Navarrete
Physiotherapist	Vacant
Team doctor	(Mexico) Arturo Cendejas

== Players ==
=== First-team squad ===
As of 4 September 2026

Note: Flags indicate national team as defined under FIFA eligibility rules; some limited exceptions apply. Players may hold more than one non-FIFA nationality.

No.	Pos.	Nation	Player
1	GK	MEX	Gerardo Magaña
2	DF	MEX	Emilio Santillán
3	DF	MEX	Pedro Hernández
4	DF	MEX	Arath Zavala
5	DF	MEX	Javier Ortega
6	MF	MEX	Eduardo del Ángel
7	MF	MEX	Diego Dueñas
8	MF	MEX	Sebastián Medellín
9	MF	MEX	Emiliano Trejo
10	FW	PAR	Bruno Recalde
11	DF	MEX	Aarón Salazar
13	MF	MEX	Fabián Flores
14	FW	MEX	Jorge Macías
15	MF	MEX	Diego Ortega
16	DF	MEX	Rafael Cortés
17	MF	MEX	Humberto Varela
18	MF	MEX	Diego Ayala
19	FW	PAR	Milciades Adorno (on loan from (Paraguay) Guaraní)

No.	Pos.	Nation	Player
20	DF	MEX	Gerardo Gil
21	DF	MEX	Alan Vélez
22	MF	MEX	Guillermo Muñoz
23	MF	MEX	Jesús Jiménez
24	MF	MEX	Gael Sánchez
25	MF	MEX	Enrique Martínez
26	DF	MEX	Paulo Morales
27	MF	MEX	Gael Ambriz
28	MF	MEX	Alberto Cañamar
29	DF	MEX	Axel Morán
30	GK	MEX	Antonio Jiménez
31	FW	MEX	Francisco Vivas
32	MF	MEX	Jorge Nakamura
33	GK	MEX	Santiago Suárez
36	MF	MEX	Elías Luna
—	MF	MEX	Jorge Rodríguez
—	FW	MEX	Jorge Gil
—	FW	MEX	Máximo Girón

=== Famous players ===
- (Argentina) Diego Cagna
- (Argentina) Diego Latorre
- (Argentina) Antonio Mohamed
- (Chile) Richard Zambrano
- (Ecuador) Ivan Hurtado
- (Honduras) Julio César de León
- (Honduras) Carlos Pavón
- (Mexico) Ignacio Ambríz
- (Brazil) José Damasceno
- (Mexico) Félix Fernández
- (Mexico) Jaime Lozano
- (Mexico) Hugo Sánchez
- (Peru) Pepe Soto
- (Spain) Emilio Butragueño
- (Spain) Rafael Martín Vázquez
- (Spain) Míchel
- (Spain) Rafael Paz

== Reserves ==
=== Atlético Celaya B ===
Reserve team that competes in the Liga Premier (Premier B), the fourth level of Mexican football.

== Honours ==
Domestic
Type	Competition	Titles	Seasons	Runners-up
Top level FMF	Primera División	0	—	1995–96
Lower levels FMF	Primera División 'A'	1	1994–95	—
