= Celaya F.C. =

Football club in Mexico

Celaya
- Full name: Celaya Fútbol Club
- Nicknames: Toros (Bulls); Cajeteros
- Short name: CEL
- Founded: 7 February 1954; 72 years ago
- Dissolved: 23 July 2026; 2 months ago
- Ground: Estadio Miguel Alemán Valdés
- Capacity: 23,182
- Owner: Desarrolladora de Fútbol México ALC S.A. de C.V.
- Chairman: Cristian Ríos
- League: Liga Premier (Serie A)
- 2025–26: Regular phase: 4th (Group III); Final phase: Champions (Reserves tournament)
- Website: www.torosclubcelaya.com
Home colours	Away colours

Celaya Fútbol Club, was a professional football club based in Celaya, Guanajuato. The club competed in Liga Premier, the third level of Mexican football, and played its home matches at Estadio Miguel Alemán Valdés. Founded in 1954, the club was renamed as Real Celaya in 1991, Cajeteros de Celaya (2003–2007), and Club Celaya in 2007. The franchise of Celaya FC was dissolved in 2026.

== History ==
=== Early years (1954–1970) ===
Celaya was established as a football club on February 7, 1954 as Celaya Fútbol Club, A.C. by Miguel Iriarte Montes, the first club president. Celaya was registered in the Segunda División Profesional, which at that time it was the second most important league in Mexico. In its second year of existence the club finished runner-up to Monterrey, who achieved to promotion to the Primera División.

In the 1957–58 tournament, the club achieved promotion after winning the season. The club did not lose in their first 18 games. The club's promotion became official on December 15, 1957 when the club defeated Nacional de Guadalajara 2–1 under the management of the Argentine Florencio Caffaratti. Celaya replaced the relegated club Tampico Madero. Celaya played in the Primera División from 1958 to 1961 and disappeared in the 1970s. After reactivation, they played in the Primera División 'A' de México (second level) and became a farm team of Querétaro. When this club was relegated after 2006–07 season, Celaya was absorbed with the Querétaro franchise and disappeared.

The club made its first appearance in the Primera División on July 13, 1958 against América, losing 4–1. The first goal scored in the top division was by Felipe Negrete in a confusing play, although Mateo De la Tijera possibly should have been credited. The club struggled in its first games and did not win until round 8 when they defeated Zamora 3–2. The club managed to stay in its league by just one point over last-place Cuautla. That year the club finished 13 in the league with 19 points, winning 4 games. Ranulfo "Chapulin" Rosas was the club's top scorer with 8 followed by Jones and Appicciafoco with 5.

For the 1959–60 tournament, the club only showed little improvement, finishing 12th play in the league with 12 points, leaving the relegation fight to Atlético Morelia and Zamora. Ferreyra was that year's top scorer with 9 goals, followed by Ortiz with 8 and Cabañas with 4.

The club's mediocre play caught up with it in the 1960–61 tournament. After finishing in last place with a record of 6 wins, 7 draws and 13 losses totaling 19 points, it was relegated. The club had started the tournament red hot, but cooled down when trainer Florencio Caffaratti left, elevating Gabriel Uñate who failed to win a single game. In that relegated squad Quaglia, J. Mercado and Ismael Ferreyra were the few players who had a good year scoring 7, 5, and 4 goals in order.

=== 1970–1993 ===
The club spent the 1960s in the Segunda División where after 10 mediocre years, the club finally folded in the 1970s. A few years later the club along with club Tecnológico de Celaya was brought back to give Celaya a professional football team. Club Celaya enrolled in the Tercera División and in the 1973–74 tournament, the club won the league. Club Celaya lost the 1975–76 Segunda Divisón final to San Luis and Tecnológico de Celaya would later be relegated to the Tercera División.

The club spent the 1980s playing on and off in the Segunda División before taking some time off and reappearing in the Primera División A in 2007.

=== 2003–2026 ===
The club was refounded in 2003 as Cajeteros de Celaya, and later renamed as Club Celaya in 2007, when the city of Celaya and Querétaro F.C. came to an agreement where Celaya would be its affiliate team in the Primera División A. The club's first year back qualified for the play-offs, but in a controversial decision the club was eliminated by the federation for an ineligible player. The club was later sold due to the fact that Querétaro had been relegated from the Primera División which allowed two clubs to be operated by the same owner. The club has been playing in the Segunda División since 2008. In the Apertura 2010, the club defeated Tampico Madero in the final and was crowned champions.

In 2011, the club was promoted to the Liga de Ascenso de México, reaching the semifinals in the Apertura 2016 and Apertura 2017 tournaments. In 2020, the Liga de Expansión MX was created and replaced the Ascenso MX as the new second level of Mexican football, however, the promotion to the Liga MX was suspended for six years. Celaya finished as runners-up twice (Apertura 2022 and Apertura 2024).

In 2023, Celaya began to enter an institutional crisis due to the Achar family, owners of the club, selling the team to an alliance formed by businessman José Hanan and sports representative Carlos Benavides. However, this operation was never officially recognized by the league and the FMF, which complicated the team's management.

In June 2025, an attempt was made to sell the team to businessman Bernardo Pasquel, owner of the baseball team El Águila de Veracruz. However, the sale was blocked by the owners of other Liga de Expansión MX clubs, leaving Celaya's future in limbo. After the sale of the franchise was blocked, a group of local businessmen attempted to initiate a project to rescue the team and ensure its continuity in the Liga de Expansión. However, the interested parties were unsuccessful in obtaining the franchise, and the Celaya main team went into hiatus for the 2025–26 season.

Due to the team's uncertainty, a group of local sponsors of Celaya founded a new squad to compete in the Liga Premier. The club was known as Club Celaya, ensuring the historical continuity of the franchise. During the 2025–26 season, this squad served as the club's de facto first team; however, it was legally registered as a reserves team, therefore, in principle, it did not have the right to promote to the Liga de Expansión and was subject to what would happen with the main franchise in the next window of name and venue changes, which would have occurred in the summer of 2026.

On 22 July 2025, the company that owned the Celaya franchise agreed to transfer the identity and sporting participation rights of the club's reserve team to businessman Cristian Ríos, thus formalizing Celaya's continued presence in the third level of Mexican football.

On 22 April 2026, the Liga de Expansión MX owners' assembly approved the sale of the franchise of Celaya FC and its relocation to Veracruz. Since the 2026–27 season, the new club Piratas F.C. replaced Celaya in the Liga de Expansión MX. Therefore, Celaya's sports project was once again left in an uncertain situation, because the sale to Veracruz included the right to use the club's affiliated teams.

On 23 July 2026, Celaya FC was dissolved to grant its franchise in the Liga Premier to the refounding of Atlético Celaya, the historic club that represented the city between 1994 and 2003.

== Stadium ==
Estadio Miguel Alemán was built and opened in 1954 in Celaya, Guanajuato. It was rebuilt 40 years later to the guidelines of the Mexican Football Federation and host to the first league meet. It was renamed in honor of President Miguel Alemán Valdés. Local teams including FC Celaya (1958–61) and Atletico Celaya Bulls (1995–02) played there.

Capacity stands at 23,182 spectators. Its design is similar to a traditional English stadium grandstand.

== Crest and colours ==
The club's original colors in the 1950s were red and white. In the late 1980s and early 1990s, the club started using black and white with a topical v shape across the chest for home games and a black stripe shirt for away games, which they still use to this date.

=== Colours ===
First kit evolution

Away 2007	Home 2009	Home 2010	Away 2011	Home 2021-22	Away 2021-22	Third 2021-22

== Names of the club ==
- Celaya Fútbol Club: (1954–1991, 2008–2026) Original name of the club.
- Real Celaya: (1991–1994) After its promotion to the Segunda División in the early 1990s, to distinguish itself from Técnologico de Celaya.
- Cajeteros de Celaya: (2003–2007) After the bankruptcy and acquisition of the sporting rights of the franchise of La Piedad.
- Club Celaya: (2007–2008) After becoming in the affiliate team of Querétaro FC.

== Honours ==
=== Domestic ===
Type	Competition	Titles	Winning years	Runners-up
Promotion divisions	Liga de Expansión MX	0	—	Cla–2022, Ape–2024
Promotion divisions	Segunda División	2	1957–58, Ind–2010	—
Promotion divisions	Copa México de la Segunda División	0	—	1967–68
Promotion divisions	Campeón de Campeones de la Segunda División	1	2011	1958
Promotion divisions	Torneo de Filiales de la Liga Premier	1	2025–26	—
Promotion divisions	Tercera División	2^{s}	1973–74, 1990–91	1980–81, 1981–82

Notes

- record
- ^{s} shared record

== Club records ==
- Tournaments in Primera División: 14
- Season in Primera División "A": 1
- Best year Primera División: 4° (1995–96)
- Worst finish in Primera División: 18° (Invierno 2000)
- Largest win margin: 5–0 against Guadalajara (Invierno 1999)
- Largest loss margin: 6–0 Against Atlante (Invierno 1996) and América (Invierno 1999)
- Most points in a tournament

Long tournaments: 52 in 1995–96
Short tournament: 24 in Verano 1999

- Most goals in a tournament

Long tournaments: 49 in 1995–96
Short tournament: 29 in Verano 1999

- Most wins in a tournament

Long tournaments: 14 in 1995–96
Short tournament: 6 in Invierno 98 and Verano 99

- Most consecutive wins: 5, 1995–96
- Most losses in a tournament: 10, Invierno 96 y 2000
- Most consecutive games without winning: 14, 1958–59
- Least number of wins in a tournament: 2, Verano 1997
- Least number of losses in a tournament: 5, Verano 1999
- Player with most goal scored: Emilio Butragueño with 14 in 1995–96
- Player with most goals scored in a game: Richard Zambrano with 4, in the victory against Veracruz in the 1994 Semi-finals.

== Managers ==
- (Mexico) Sergio Rubio (2007)
- (Mexico) Miguel de Jesús Fuentes (2009–12)
- (Uruguay) Gustavo Díaz (2015–2017)
- (Argentina) Ricardo Valiño (2017–2018)
- (Mexico) Enrique Maximiliano Meza (2018)
- (Mexico) José Islas (2018–2019)
- (Mexico) Héctor Altamirano (2019–2020)
- (Mexico) Israel Hernández Pat (2020–2022)
- (Mexico) Paco Ramírez (2022–2023)
- (Argentina) Cristian Paulucci (2023–2024)
- (Uruguay) Sergio Blanco (2024–2025)
- (Mexico) Luis Fernando Soto (2025–2026)

== See also ==
- Mexican Primera División
- Liga de Ascenso
- Segunda División Profesional
