= 1994–95 Santos Laguna season =

Santos Laguna
1994-95 season
- Owner: Grupo Modelo
- President: Martín Ibarreche
- Manager: Miguel Ángel López
- Stadium: Estadio Corona
- Primera Division: 8th Quarterfinals
- Copa Mexico: Quarterfinals
- Top goalscorer: Miguel Asprilla (16 goals)
Home colours	Away colours
- All statistics correct as of 27 January 2019.

The 1994–95 Santos Laguna season is the club's 5th consecutive season in the top flight division of Mexican football.

== Summary ==
During the summer the club's owner Grupo Modelo, appointed a new club president Martín Ibarreche replacing Francisco Dávila Rodriguez. The new president sold two fan-favourite players; left-winger Ramón Ramírez and forward Daniel Guzmán, who were both transferred to CD Guadalajara in exchange for midfielder Benjamín Galindo, forward Everaldo Begines and Juan Jose Balcazar. The club added two additional players, Mario Ordiales and Rogelio Romero from CD Toluca, Santos's sister club that is also owned by Grupo Modelo. Argentine midfielder Marcelo Carracedo, after several seasons playing in Germany and Austria, joined the club becoming its fourth foreign player. He arrived just before Santos went on its inaugural pre-season tournament in Colombia.

After a poor first half of the season, Ibarreche appointed a new manager. Miguel Ángel López would replace Pedro García who had led Santos to the 1993–94 Mexican Primera División season final. Zurdo López, who previously managed Club América, arrived with optimism as Santos was second place in Group 4 despite the club's slow start.

Santos was in Group 4 along C.F. Monterrey, Club León and Atlas FC. Each club was experiencing a transitional stage with three new managers (López, León's Roberto Saporiti and Atlas' Marcelo Bielsa), new transfers and the exodus of their best players. Despite the club's strong performances in the previous season, Santos Laguna had an indifferent first half of the season with a defensive record among the worst in the entire league. The squad also struggled offensively with only Colombian striker Miguel Asprilla regularly performing at a high level. It was the midfield and in particular Benjamín Galindo that helped the unbalanced squad finish top of Group 4 and classify directly to the play-off quarterfinals.

Finally, the team was eliminated in the play-offs by CD Guadalajara. After winning the first leg, Santos conceded a late goal (scored by former Santos' player Daniel Guzmán) in the second leg, and lost the tie on away goals.

== Squad ==
Note: Flags indicate national team as defined under FIFA eligibility rules; some limited exceptions apply. Players may hold more than one non-FIFA nationality.

No.	Pos.	Nation	Player
—	GK	MEX	Olaf Heredia
—	MF	MEX	Felipe de Jesus Amezcua
—	MF	MEX	Jesus Gomez
—	DF	MEX	Pedro Muñoz
—	DF	MEX	Salvador Mariscal
—	MF	MEX	Diego Silva
—	MF	ARG	Antonio Apud
—	MF	MEX	Benjamin Galindo
—	MF	ARG	Héctor Adomaitis
—	FW	ARG	Marcelo Carracedo
—	FW	COL	Miguel Asprilla

No.	Pos.	Nation	Player
—	GK	MEX	Adrian Marmolejo
—	DF	MEX	Juan Jose Balcazar
—	FW	MEX	Everaldo Begines
—	MF	MEX	Rogelio Romero
—	MF	MEX	Mario Ordiales
—	MF	MEX	Antonio Gonzalez
—	DF	MEX	Antonio Alcantara
—	MF	CHI	Richard Zambrano
—	MF	BRA	Wagner de Souza

=== Transfers ===
In
Pos.	Name	from	Type
MF	Benjamín Galindo	CD Guadalajara	
FW	Juan Jose Balcazar	CD Guadalajara	
FW	Everaldo Begines	CD Guadalajara	
DF	Salvador Mariscal	Atlas FC	
MF	Mario Ordiales	CD Toluca	
MF	Rogelio Romero	CD Toluca	
MF	Marcelo Carracedo	FC Tirol Innsbruck	

Out
Pos.	Name	To	Type
MF	Ramón Ramírez	CD Guadalajara	
FW	Daniel Guzmán	CD Guadalajara	
FW	Juan Antonio Flores Barrera	Atlético Morelia	
DF	Guillermo Gomez	Correcaminos UAT	
FW	Alvaro Torres	Tampico Madero	
DF	Rubén Martínez	Tampico Madero	

== Competitions ==
=== La Liga ===
==== League table ====
===== Group 1 =====
Pos	Team	Pld	W	D	L	GF	GA	GD	Pts	Qualification
1	Santos Laguna	36	13	9	14	61	62	−1	35	Playoff
2	Monterrey	36	9	15	12	37	52	−15	33	Playoff
3	Atlas	36	12	8	16	43	52	−9	32	
4	León	36	11	9	16	39	55	−16	31	

===== General table =====
Pos	Team	Pld	W	D	L	GF	GA	GD	Pts	Qualification
6	UNAM	36	15	11	10	49	36	+13	41	Qualification for the quarter-finals (Note: The first four places in the table and teams ranked 6th and 8th qualified for the Liguilla quarter-finals.)
7	Puebla	36	12	16	8	45	41	+4	40	Qualification for the Repechaje (Note: Teams ranked 5th, 7th, 9th and 11th in the table qualified for Repechaje)
8	Santos Laguna	36	13	9	14	61	62	−1	35	Qualification for the quarter-finals
9	Veracruz	36	12	11	13	43	51	−8	35	Qualification for the Repechaje
10	Atlante	36	11	11	14	57	69	−12	33	

Source: Liga MX
Rules for classification: 1) Points; 2) Goal difference; 3) Number of goals scored; 4) Head-to-head results between tied teams; 5) Number of goals scored away; 6) Highest relegation coefficient; 7) Fair Play points

===== Results by round =====
Round	1	2	3	4	5	6	7	8	9	10	11	12	13	14	15	16	17	18	19	20	21	22	23	24	25	26	27	28	29	30	31	32	33	34	35	36	37	38
Ground	A	H	A	H	A	H	A	H	A	H	A	H	H	A	H	A	H	A	H	H	A	H	A	H	A	H	A	H	A	H	A	A	H	A	H	A	H	A
Result	W	W	L	L	D	W	L	W	W	L	-	D	D	W	D	L	W	D	W	D	L	D	L	D	W	L	W	L	L	-	L	D	D	D	W	W	L	L
Position	8	9	4	8	14	15	17	19	17	17	15	17	18	19	19	18	18	14	15	16	17	18	16	15	16	15	14	14	13	9	8	9	10	10	10	9	9	8

Source: Competitive matches
A = Away; H = Home; W = Win; D = Draw; L = Loss; P = Postponed; = Leader, Qualification for the quarter-finals; C = Qualification for the quarter-finals as group leader.; E = Qualification for the quarter-finals as group runner-up.; R = Qualification for the Repechaje.

==== Matches ====
4 September 1994 1	Santos	3-2	CD Guadalajara	Torreon
	Galindo 31', 82'; Bejines 56'		52' (pen.), 69' (pen.) de la Torre	Stadium: Corona

10 September 1994 2	Leones Negros UdeG	bye	Santos	Guadalajara
				Stadium: Jalisco

18 September 1994 3	Santos	3-2	Veracruz	Torreon
	Miguel Asprilla 18'; Everaldo Bejines 49'; Adomaitis 85' (pen.)		69', 83' (pen.) José Luis González China	Stadium: Corona

23 September 1994 4	América	2-1	Santos Laguna	Coyoacan
	Luis F. Peña 11' del Olmo 78'		86' Adomaitis	Stadium: Azteca

2 October 1994 5	Santos	1-3	Pumas UNAM	Torreon
	Galindo 45' (pen.)		20', 38' (pen.) Campos; 80' Jorge Santillana	Stadium: Corona

8 October 1994 6	Tampico Madero	4-2	Santos	Tampico
	Héctor del Ángel 8', 45'; Carlos Contreras 53'; Guillermo Galindo 72'		10' Adomaitis; 38' Ernesto Pérez	Stadium: Tamaulipas

16 October 1994 7	Santos	0-2	Necaxa	Torreon
			55' Aspe; 81' Luis Hernández	Stadium: Corona

23 October 1994 8	CD Toluca	4-2	Santos	Toluca
	Arnulfo Tinoco 39'; Pavon 50', 65', 85'		69' Galindo; 73' Miguel Asprilla	Stadium: La Bombonera

30 October 1994 9	Santos	1-0	CF Monterrey	Torreon
	Fernando Gil 25'			Stadium: Corona

6 November 1994 10	Leon	1-0	Santos	Leon de los Aldama
	Dezotti 75'			Stadium: Nou Camp

13 November 1994 11	Santos	2-1	Atlas FC	Torreon
	Ricardo Wagner de Souza 67'; Adomaitis 89'		61' Ubaldi	Stadium: Corona

18 November 1994 12	Tecos UAG	2-1	Santos	Zapopan
	Javier Hernández 62'; Gallaga 78'		29' Fernando Gil	Stadium: 3 de Marzo

26 November 1994 13	Puebla FC	2-0	Santos	Puebla de los Angeles
	Milton Queiroz "Tita" 16'; Rodrigo Ruiz 68'			Stadium: Cuauhtemoc

30 November 1994 14	Santos	2-5	Cruz Azul	Torreon
	Begines 43'; Adomaitis 78' (pen.)		34', 51' Julio Zamora; 62', 89' Hermosillo; 75' Pedro Duana	Stadium: Corona

4 December 1994 15	Atlético Morelia	2-2	Santos	Morelia
	Jaime Vera 19'; Hugo Santana 80'		40' Adomaitis; 51' Galindo	Stadium: Morelos

11 December 1994 16	Santos	2-2	Atlante FC	Torreon
	Benjamín Galindo 44, Jesús Gómez 80		Guillermo Cantú 27, Gastón Obledo 57	Stadium: Corona

18 December 1994 17	Correcaminos UAT	1-2	Santos	Ciudad Victoria
	Alex Pineda 78' (pen.)		13', 19' Begines	Stadium: Marte R.Gomez

23 December 1994 18	Santos	2-1	Tigres UANL	Torreon
	Miguel Asprilla 20'; Marcelo Carracedo 70'		53' José Luis González	Stadium: Corona

30 December 1994 19	Toros Neza	1-0	Santos	Ciudad Nezahualcoyotl
	Gonzalo Farfán 21'			Stadium: Neza 86

8 January 1995 20	CD Guadalajara	3-1	Santos	Guadalajara
	Missael Espinosa 12', 29'; José Manuel de la Torre 85'		59' (pen.) Héctor Adomaitis	Stadium: Jalisco

15 January 1995 21	Santos	bye	Leones Negros UdeG	Torreon
				Stadium: Corona

21 January 1995	Veracruz	3-3	Santos Laguna	Veracruz
	Víctor Medina 38'; Leonel Bolsonello 57' (pen.); José Luis Malibrán 71'		39' Antonio Apud , 52' Miguel Asprilla , 76' Everaldo Bejines	Stadium: Pirata Fuente

29 January 1995 23	Santos Laguna	2-0	América	Torreon
	Asprilla 76', 82'			Stadium: Corona

3 February 1995 24	U.N.A.M.	1-1	Santos Laguna	Tlalpan
	Antonio Sancho 35'		50' (o.g.) Antonio Sancho	Stadium: Olimpico Universitario

12 February 1995 25	Santos Laguna	1-1	TM Gallos Blancos	Torreon
	Claudio Úbeda 13' (o.g.)		31' (o.g.) Jesús Gómez	Stadium: Corona

18 February 1995 26	Club Necaxa	1-1	Santos Laguna	Tlalpan
	Gerardo Esquivel 40'		27' Héctor Adomaitis	Stadium: Azteca

26 February 1995 27	Santos Laguna	2-2	Toluca
	Pedro Muñoz 54, Miguel Asprilla 82		José Manuel Abundis 29, Marcelino Bernal 78

4 March 1995 28	CF Monterrey	1-1	Santos Laguna	Monterrey
	Carlos Alberto Bianchezi 58'		68' Miguel Asprilla	Stadium: Tecnológico

12 March 1995 29	Santos Laguna	2-1	Leon	Torreon
	Miguel Asprilla 4'; Héctor Adomaitis 68' (pen.)		22' Gustavo Dezotti	Stadium: Corona

18 March 1995 30	Atlas FC	1-3	Santos Laguna	Guadalajara
	Esteve Padilla 58'		Benjamín Galindo 18'; Miguel Asprilla 81'; Antonio Apud 83'	Stadium: Jalisco

26 March 1995 31	Santos Laguna	3-0	Tecos UAG	Torreon
	Benjamín Galindo 49' (pen.); Héctor Adomaitis 66', 89'			Stadium: Corona

2 April 1995 32	Santos Laguna	1-1	Puebla FC	Torreon
	Salvador Mariscal 22'		58' Alfonso Sosa	Stadium: Corona

6 April 1995 33	Cruz Azul	5-2	Santos Laguna	Tlalpan
	Julio Zamora 8' (pen.), 55'; Marcelo Delgado 9'; Pintado 76'; Octavio Mora 88' (pen.)		37', 79' Miguel Asprilla	Stadium: Azteca

9 April 1995 34	Santos Laguna	2-0	Atlético Morelia	Torreon
	Miguel Asprilla 10', 70'			Stadium: Corona

14 April 1995 35	Atlante FC	3-2	Santos Laguna	Benito Juarez
	Wilson Graniolatti 34'; Luis Miguel Salvador 55'; Roberto Andrade 58'		54', 64' Carracedo	Stadium: Azulgrana

23 April 1995 36	Santos Laguna	4-0	Correcaminos UAT	Torreon
	Carracedo 7'; Miguel Asprilla 40'; Galindo 53', 58'			Stadium: Corona

29 April 1995 37	Tigres UANL	1-0	Santos Laguna	San Nicolas de los Garza
	Javier Lozano 44' (pen.)			Stadium: Universitario

7 May 1995 38	Santos Laguna	4-1	Toros Neza	Torreon
	Adomaitis 44', 76'; Miguel Asprilla 85'; Carracedo 89'		58' Apolinar Cortés	Stadium: Corona

==== Quarter-finals ====
17 May 1995	Santos	3-1	Guadalajara	Torreón
16:00	Asprilla 8', 65'; Adomaitis 79'		Guzmán 15'	Stadium: Corona

20 May 1995	Guadalajara	2-0	Santos	Guadalajara
20:45	Espinoza 50'; Guzmán 85'			Stadium: Jalisco
