= 1996–97 Santos Laguna season =

Santos Laguna
1996–97 season
- Manager: Alfredo Tena
- Stadium: Estadio Corona
- Invierno: 2nd Playoffs: Winners
- Verano: 7th Playoffs: Quarterfinals
- Copa México: Group stage
- Top goalscorer: League: Jared Borgetti (21 goals); All: Jared Borgetti (23 goals)
- Biggest win: Santos Laguna 4–2 Atlas (22 December 1996)
- Biggest defeat: Guadalajara 5–0 Santos Laguna (18 May 1997)
Home colours
- All statistics correct as of 31 January 2019.

The 1996–97 Santos Laguna season was the 9th season in the football club's history. Santos competed in Primera División and Copa México, winning the Verano 1996 tournament, their first league title ever.

== Coaching staff ==
| Position | Name |
|---|---|
| Head coach | (Mexico) Alfredo Tena |
| Assistant coaches | (Mexico) Pablo Luna |
| Assistant coaches | (Mexico) José Vantolrá |
| Fitness coach | (Mexico) Luiz Duarte |
| Doctor | (Mexico) Jorge Galván |

== Players ==
=== Squad information ===
| No. | Pos. | Nat. | Name | Date of birth (age) | Signed in | Previous club |
Goalkeepers
| 1 | GK | (Argentina) | José Miguel | 23 June 1969 (aged 27) | 1995 | (Argentina) Platense |
| 20 | GK | (Mexico) | Olaf Heredia | 19 October 1957 (aged 38) | 1993 | (Mexico) Cruz Azul |
Defenders
| 2 | DF | (Mexico) | Julio César Algarín | 29 April 1969 (aged 27) | | |
| 3 | DF | (Mexico) | Salvador Mariscal | 13 February 1970 (aged 26) | | |
| 4 | DF | (Mexico) | Pedro Muñoz (VC) | 19 October 1966 (aged 29) | 1987 | |
| 5 | DF | (Mexico) | José Guadalupe Rubio | 14 March 1966 (aged 30) | 1987 | (Mexico) Panteras Torreón |
| 13 | DF | (Mexico) | Francisco Gabriel de Anda (Captain) | 5 June 1971 (aged 25) | 1995 | (Mexico) UAT |
| 17 | DF | (Mexico) | Antonio González | 17 January 1966 (aged 30) | | |
| 23 | DF | (Brazil) | Ricardo Wagner de Souza | 23 April 1972 (aged 24) | 1993 | |
Midfielders
| 6 | MF | (Mexico) | Miguel España | 31 January 1964 (aged 32) | 1995 | (Mexico) UANL |
| 7 | MF | (Mexico) | Benjamín Galindo | 11 December 1960 (aged 35) | 1994 | (Mexico) Guadalajara |
| 10 | MF | (Argentina) | Héctor Adomaitis | 12 June 1970 (aged 26) | 1993 | (Chile) Colo-Colo |
| 14 | MF | (Mexico) | Daniel Deeke | 6 January 1974 (aged 22) | 1996 | (Mexico) UANL |
| 15 | MF | (Mexico) | Alberto García | 7 January 1965 (aged 31) | 1996 | (Mexico) Guadalajara |
| 16 | MF | (Mexico) | Nicolás Ramírez | 16 February 1974 (aged 22) | 1994 | |
| 19 | MF | (Mexico) | Saúl Quiñones | 31 October 1972 (aged 23) | 1996 | |
| 22 | MF | (Mexico) | José Alberto Mariscal | 17 March 1964 (aged 32) | 1997 (Winter) | (Mexico) Toluca |
Forwards
| 9 | FW | (Argentina) | Gabriel Caballero | 5 February 1971 (aged 25) | 1995 | (Chile) Antofagasta |
| 18 | FW | (Mexico) | Jared Borgetti | 14 August 1973 (aged 22) | 1996 | (Mexico) Atlas |
| 21 | FW | (Chile) | Cristián Montecinos | 29 December 1970 (aged 25) | 1996 | (Colombia) Deportes Tolima |

Players and squad numbers last updated on 31 January 2019.
Note: Flags indicate national team as has been defined under FIFA eligibility rules. Players may hold more than one non-FIFA nationality.

== Competitions ==
=== Overview ===
| Competition | First match | Last match | Starting round | Final position | Record | | | | | | | |
| Competition | First match | Last match | Starting round | Final position | Pld | W | D | L | GF | GA | GD | Win % |
|---|---|---|---|---|---|---|---|---|---|---|---|---|
| Torneo Invierno | 11 August 1996 | 22 December 1996 | Matchday 1 | Winners | 23 | 14 | 5 | 4 | 34 | 22 | +12 | 60.87 |
| Torneo Verano | 13 January 1997 | 18 May 1997 | Matchday 1 | 7th | 19 | 8 | 3 | 8 | 28 | 34 | −6 | 42.11 |
| Copa México | 6 July 1996 | 28 July 1996 | Group stage | Group stage | 7 | 1 | 4 | 2 | 9 | 9 | +0 | 14.29 |
| Total | | | | | 49 | 23 | 12 | 14 | 71 | 65 | +6 | 46.94 |

Source: RSSSF.com

=== Torneo Invierno ===
==== League table ====
| Pos | Team | Pld | W | D | L | GF | GA | GD | Pts | Qualification or relegation |
|---|---|---|---|---|---|---|---|---|---|---|
| 1 | Atlante | 17 | 12 | 2 | 3 | 30 | 11 | +19 | 38 | Advance to Liguilla (Playoffs) |
| 2 | Santos Laguna (C) | 17 | 10 | 4 | 3 | 21 | 15 | +6 | 34 | Advance to Liguilla (Playoffs) |
| 3 | Guadalajara | 17 | 9 | 4 | 4 | 33 | 19 | +14 | 31 | Advance to Liguilla (Playoffs) |
| 4 | Puebla | 17 | 9 | 4 | 4 | 32 | 22 | +10 | 31 | Advance to Liguilla (Playoffs) |
| 5 | Toluca | 17 | 9 | 3 | 5 | 26 | 15 | +11 | 30 | Advance to Liguilla (Playoffs) |

Source: Liga MX
Rules for classification: 1) Points; 2) Goal difference; 3) Number of goals scored; 4) Head-to-head results between tied teams; 5) Number of goals scored away; 6) Highest relegation coefficient; 7) Fair Play points
(C) Champions

==== Results summary ====
| Overall | | | | | | | | Home | | | | | | Away | | | | | |
| Pld | W | D | L | GF | GA | GD | Pts | W | D | L | GF | GA | GD | W | D | L | GF | GA | GD |
|---|---|---|---|---|---|---|---|---|---|---|---|---|---|---|---|---|---|---|---|
| 17 | 10 | 4 | 3 | 21 | 15 | +6 | 34 | 5 | 1 | 2 | 9 | 7 | +2 | 5 | 3 | 1 | 12 | 8 | +4 |

Source: Liga MX

=== Torneo Verano ===
==== League table ====
| Pos | Team | Pld | W | D | L | GF | GA | GD | Pts | Qualification or relegation |
|---|---|---|---|---|---|---|---|---|---|---|
| 5 | Atlante | 17 | 8 | 4 | 5 | 23 | 19 | +4 | 28 | Advance to Liguilla (Playoffs) |
| 6 | UNAM | 17 | 8 | 3 | 6 | 25 | 26 | −1 | 27 | Advance to Liguilla (Playoffs) |
| 7 | Santos Laguna | 17 | 8 | 2 | 7 | 27 | 28 | −1 | 26 | Advance to Liguilla (Playoffs) |
| 8 | Morelia | 17 | 6 | 7 | 4 | 26 | 23 | +3 | 25 | Advance to Repechage |
| 9 | Cruz Azul | 17 | 7 | 4 | 6 | 21 | 24 | −3 | 25 | |

Source: Liga MX
Rules for classification: 1) Points; 2) Goal difference; 3) Number of goals scored; 4) Head-to-head results between tied teams; 5) Number of goals scored away; 6) Highest relegation coefficient; 7) Fair Play points

==== Results summary ====
| Overall | | | | | | | | Home | | | | | | Away | | | | | |
| Pld | W | D | L | GF | GA | GD | Pts | W | D | L | GF | GA | GD | W | D | L | GF | GA | GD |
|---|---|---|---|---|---|---|---|---|---|---|---|---|---|---|---|---|---|---|---|
| 17 | 8 | 2 | 7 | 27 | 28 | −1 | 26 | 7 | 0 | 2 | 18 | 11 | +7 | 1 | 2 | 5 | 9 | 17 | −8 |

Source: Liga MX

== Statistics ==
=== Goals ===
| Rank | Player | Position | Invierno | Verano | Copa México | Total |
|---|---|---|---|---|---|---|
| 1 | (Mexico) Jared Borgetti | FW | 16 | 5 | 2 | 23 |
| 2 | (Argentina) Gabriel Caballero | FW | 3 | 13 | 0 | 16 |
| 3 | (Mexico) Benjamín Galindo | MF | 5 | 1 | 3 | 9 |
| 4 | (Chile) Cristián Montecinos | FW | 2 | 2 | 1 | 5 |
| 4 | (Mexico) Nicolás Ramírez | MF | 2 | 1 | 2 | 5 |
| 6 | (Mexico) Alberto García | MF | 1 | 2 | 0 | 3 |
| 6 | (Mexico) Pedro Muñoz | DF | 2 | 0 | 1 | 3 |
| 8 | (Argentina) Héctor Adomaitis | MF | 1 | 1 | 0 | 2 |
| 8 | (Mexico) Francisco Gabriel de Anda | DF | 1 | 1 | 0 | 2 |
| 10 | (Mexico) Daniel Deeke | MF | 0 | 1 | 0 | 1 |
| 10 | (Mexico) José Guadalupe Rubio | DF | 1 | 0 | 0 | 1 |
| Total | | | 34 | 27 | 9 | 70 |

=== Hat-tricks ===
| Player | Against | Result | Date | Competition |
|---|---|---|---|---|
| (Mexico) Jared Borgetti | Toros Neza | 3–2 (A) | 15 December 1996 | Primera División |

=== Own goals ===
| Player | Against | Result | Date | Competition |
|---|---|---|---|---|
| (Mexico) José Guadalupe Rubio | Morelia | 2–1 (H) | 25 August 1996 | Primera División |
| (Mexico) Benjamín Galindo | Necaxa | 0–1 (A) | 19 December 1996 | Primera División |

=== Clean sheets ===
| Rank | Name | Invierno | Verano | Total |
|---|---|---|---|---|
| 1 | (Argentina) José Miguel | 8 | 3 | 11 |
| 2 | (Mexico) Olaf Heredia | 1 | 0 | 1 |
| Total | | 9 | 3 | 12 |
