= List of Club Santos Laguna managers =

Club Santos Laguna has had a total of twenty coaches throughout their history in the Primera División, the coach varies in its functions implemented in the football section, responsible for study, plan, assess and evaluate the players. The club has had multiple service coaches, most of them Mexican nationals have been sixteen, counting ten times the services of foreign coaches five Argentines, two Uruguayans, Chilean, a Honduran and a Portuguese.

== List of managers ==
Name	Período	G	W	D	L	GF	GA	DIF	%
(Mexico) Carlos Ortiz	1988-89 – 1989-90	50	8	26	16	46	71	-25	42%
(Mexico) Diego Malta	1988–89	7	0	3	4	4	11	-7	21.43%
(Mexico) Rubén Maturano	1989–90; 1991–92	73	22	22	29	80	99	-19	45.21%
(Honduras) José de la Paz Herrera	1990–91	2	0	0	2	1	4	-3	0%
(Mexico) José Luis Estrada	1990–91	20	3	3	14	15	30	-15	22.5%
(Uruguay) Roberto Matosas	1990–91; 1992–93	34	8	14	12	34	53	-19	44.12%
(Mexico) Ignacio Jáuregui	1991–92	7	2	1	4	6	11	-5	35.71%
(Argentina) Pedro Dellacha	1992–93	7	1	2	4	7	10	-3	28.57%
(Chile) Pedro García	1992-93 – 1994-95	69	24	20	25	88	101	-13	49.28%
(Mexico) Martín Ibacherre	1994–95	7	1	2	4	13	17	-4	28.57%
(Argentina) Miguel Ángel López	1994–95; Invierno 1998	37	14	11	12	63	55	8	56.92%
(Argentina) Patricio Hernández	1995–96	30	8	10	12	36	35	1	37.78%
(Mexico) José Vantolrá	1995–96	3	0	1	2	4	6	-2	11.11%
(Mexico) Alfredo Tena	1995-96 – Verano 1998	93	37	23	33	130	134	-4	48.03%
(Mexico) Juan de Dios Castillo	Invierno 1998 – Invierno 1999	40	17	6	17	74	79	-5	47.5%
(Mexico) Fernando Quirarte	Invierno 1999 – Verano 2002	131	58	33	40	249	210	39	52.67%
(Mexico) Sergio Bueno	Apertura 2002; Clausura 2009 – Apertura 2009	36	13	10	13	50	50	0	45.37%
(Mexico) Luis Fernando Tena	Apertura 2002 – Apertura 2003	56	24	16	16	106	85	21	52.38%
(Mexico) Eduardo de la Torre	Clausura 2004 – Apertura 2005	84	30	20	34	138	131	7	43.65%
(Mexico) Jorge Vantolrá	Apertura 2005	3	1	0	2	7	9	-2	33.33%
(Mexico) Benjamín Galindo	Clausura 2006; Apertura 2011 – Apertura 2012	77	38	19	20	144	101	43	57.58%
(Uruguay) Wilson Graniolatti	Clausura 2006 – Apertura 2006	17	3	8	6	21	29	-8	33.33%
(Mexico) Daniel Guzmán	Apertura 2006 – Clausura 2009	120	46	42	32	191	151	40	50%
(Argentina) Rubén Omar Romano	Bicentenario 2010 – Clausura 2011	64	32	14	18	115	83	32	57.29%
(Argentina) Diego Cocca	Clausura 2011 – Apertura 2011	22	8	2	12	36	36	0	39.39%
(Mexico) Eduardo Rergis	Apertura 2011	1	0	1	0	1	1	0	33.33%
(Portugal) Pedro Caixinha	Clausura 2013 – Act.	83	36	26	21	136	109	27	53.82%
