= 1993–94 Mexican Primera División season =

52nd professional season of the top-flight football league in Mexico

Primera División de México
- Season: 1993–94
- Champions: Tecos (1st title)
- Relegated: Querétaro
- Champions' Cup: Tecos; Santos
- CONCACAF Cup Winners Cup: Necaxa
- Matches: 398
- Goals: 1,081 (2.72 per match)
- Top goalscorer: Carlos Hermosillo (27 goals)

Statistics of Primera División de México for the 1993–94 season.

== Overview ==
It was contested by 20 teams, and Tecos won the championship.

Toros Neza was promoted from Segunda División. The team started the season in Ciudad Nezahualcóyotl, however, the use of the Neza 86 Stadium was denied by the Mexican Football Federation, for this reason, the team was moved to Pachuca and changed its name to Toros Hidalgo.

Querétaro was relegated to Segunda División.

=== Teams ===
Location of the 1993-94 Primera División teams

Team	City	Stadium
América	Mexico City	Azteca
Atlante	Mexico City	Azulgrana
Atlas	Guadalajara, Jalisco	Jalisco
Cruz Azul	Mexico City	Azteca
Guadalajara	Guadalajara, Jalisco	Jalisco
León	León, Guanajuato	Nou Camp
Morelia	Morelia, Michoacán	Morelos
Monterrey	Monterrey, Nuevo León	Tecnológico
Necaxa	Mexico City	Azteca
Toros Neza-Hidalgo	Nezahualcóyotl, State of Mexico; Pachuca, Hidalgo	Neza 86; Hidalgo
Puebla	Puebla, Puebla	Cuauhtémoc
Querétaro	Querétaro, Querétaro	Corregidora
Santos Laguna	Torreón, Coahuila	Corona
Tecos	Zapopan, Jalisco	Tres de Marzo
Toluca	Toluca, State of Mexico	La Bombonera
UANL	Monterrey, Nuevo León	Universitario
UAT	Ciudad Victoria, Tamaulipas	Marte R. Gómez
UdeG	Guadalajara, Jalisco	Jalisco
UNAM	Mexico City	Olímpico Universitario
Veracruz	Veracruz, Veracruz	Luis "Pirata" Fuente

== Moves ==
After this season U. de G. franchise was sold to a group of 15 Segunda Division clubs to form an intermediate division called Primera Division "A", between Primera Division and Segunda Division. The new owners disappeared the team.

== Group stage ==
=== Group 1 ===
Pos	Team	Pld	W	D	L	GF	GA	GD	Pts	Qualification
1	Santos	38	16	13	9	58	56	+2	45	Playoff
2	Necaxa	38	12	15	11	54	52	+2	39	Playoff
3	Puebla	38	9	16	13	41	49	−8	34	
4	UANL	38	7	16	15	34	58	−24	30	
5	U. de G.	38	8	13	17	39	60	−21	29	

=== Group 2 ===
Pos	Team	Pld	W	D	L	GF	GA	GD	Pts	Qualification or relegation
1	Atlante	38	19	4	15	78	59	+19	42	Playoff
2	Morelia	38	14	11	13	64	65	−1	39	Playoff
3	UNAM	38	15	8	15	57	46	+11	38	
4	León	38	14	10	14	47	50	−3	38	
5	Querétaro	38	6	15	17	38	60	−22	27	Relegated

=== Group 3 ===
Pos	Team	Pld	W	D	L	GF	GA	GD	Pts	Qualification
1	Cruz Azul	38	18	12	8	62	33	+29	48	Playoff
2	Toluca	38	18	10	10	54	32	+22	46	Playoff
3	América	38	17	6	15	67	51	+16	40	Playoff
4	Veracruz	38	12	10	16	50	65	−15	34	
5	Correcaminos	38	6	15	17	36	53	−17	27	

=== Group 4 ===
Pos	Team	Pld	W	D	L	GF	GA	GD	Pts	Qualification
1	Tecos	38	17	17	4	49	26	+23	51	Playoff
2	Atlas	38	16	11	11	55	40	+15	43	Playoff
3	Guadalajara	38	15	13	10	44	34	+10	43	Playoff
4	Monterrey	38	12	12	14	56	71	−15	36	
5	Toros Neza-Hidalgo	38	10	11	17	46	69	−23	31	

== Results ==
Home \ Away	AME	ATE	ATS	CAZ	GDL	LEO	MTY	MOR	NEC	PUE	QRO	SAN	TEC	TOL	TNH	UNL	UAT	UDG	UNM	VER
América	—	2–3	3–1	0–3	1–0	2–0	6–0	2–0	0–1	2–0	3–0	1–1	3–1	2–1	2–3	4–1	1–0	4–1	1–2	5–1
Atlante	0–3	—	4–2	1–2	3–0	5–0	4–1	2–2	4–1	2–0	2–0	1–1	0–1	0–1	5–1	4–1	1–1	4–1	0–1	1–2
Atlas	1–2	2–0	—	1–2	1–1	2–1	1–2	4–0	2–1	0–0	2–1	1–2	1–1	2–1	3–0	2–0	3–0	2–1	3–1	1–2
Cruz Azul	1–0	2–1	0–0	—	1–1	0–1	0–0	1–1	1–1	1–0	1–0	0–0	3–0	0–0	0–1	4–0	2–1	1–1	4–0	4–1
Guadalajara	0–0	1–2	0–0	1–4	—	4–1	1–0	1–1	1–0	2–0	1–0	1–1	0–0	1–2	0–0	3–0	4–0	1–1	0–0	1–2
León	1–0	1–0	2–1	1–1	0–0	—	2–2	2–1	1–0	1–1	2–1	6–2	1–1	0–1	2–0	4–1	2–1	1–2	2–1	3–0
Monterrey	1–2	3–1	2–2	1–3	0–1	1–1	—	4–4	1–1	1–1	3–2	3–0	2–3	1–1	2–1	1–0	1–1	3–0	3–2	3–2
Morelia	4–3	3–2	0–2	2–2	1–2	0–0	5–2	—	2–0	2–2	4–1	1–1	3–1	0–2	2–0	2–0	2–1	1–0	1–4	1–1
Necaxa	1–0	3–0	1–1	2–1	1–0	1–1	7–0	3–1	—	2–2	2–0	1–2	0–0	4–1	1–1	2–1	2–2	3–2	1–1	3–2
Puebla	1–0	2–2	2–0	1–1	3–5	1–0	1–0	2–3	0–0	—	1–1	3–0	0–1	0–4	3–2	1–1	1–1	2–0	2–1	0–1
Querétaro	1–1	2–4	1–1	2–1	0–1	2–1	1–3	2–0	1–1	1–1	—	1–1	1–2	0–0	1–1	3–1	3–0	0–0	1–0	2–2
Santos	4–2	3–2	1–0	2–0	1–2	1–0	3–0	3–3	3–3	2–1	2–2	—	0–3	0–0	1–0	0–0	1–1	3–2	3–1	4–0
Tecos	4–0	1–2	0–0	1–0	2–1	2–0	1–1	2–1	4–0	2–2	2–0	4–1	—	0–0	3–0	0–0	1–0	1–1	0–0	0–0
Toluca	2–1	3–1	2–0	2–3	1–2	1–1	1–1	0–1	1–1	3–1	4–0	3–0	0–1	—	1–2	3–0	1–0	3–1	0–1	2–0
Toros Neza-Hidalgo	1–1	1–0	0–3	2–8	1–0	3–2	1–2	3–1	3–1	1–2	1–1	0–2	1–1	2–3	—	0–0	3–1	3–3	1–1	3–1
UANL	4–2	0–1	1–1	1–0	0–0	0–0	2–4	2–1	0–0	1–0	2–2	1–3	1–1	1–2	1–1	—	2–2	0–0	1–0	2–1
UAT	1–1	2–3	1–2	0–2	2–0	2–0	1–0	1–1	2–2	0–0	4–0	0–0	1–1	1–1	2–1	2–2	—	1–0	0–1	1–1
U. de G.	0–0	1–2	0–2	1–1	1–1	0–3	1–0	3–2	3–1	1–0	1–1	1–2	0–0	0–0	5–2	0–2	2–1	—	0–2	1–0
UNAM	2–3	3–4	1–2	1–2	0–1	5–1	1–1	1–3	2–0	1–1	2–1	3–1	0–0	0–1	2–0	1–1	2–0	2–0	—	4–0
Veracruz	3–2	2–4	1–1	2–0	1–3	3–0	4–1	1–2	3–0	1–1	0–0	3–1	0–1	1–0	0–0	1–1	2–1	2–2	1–4	—

Updated to match(es) played on 2 April 1994. Source: RSSSF
Legend: Blue = home team win; Yellow = draw; Red = away team win.

== Playoff ==
- If the two teams are tied after two legs, the higher-seeded team advances.

Repechaje					Qualifiers
6	Guadalajara	2	2	4
10	Morelia	2	3	5	10	Morelia
8	América	2	2	4	8	América
9	Necaxa	0	2	2

Quarterfinals
1	Tecos	3	3	6
10	Morelia	0	0	0
2	Cruz Azul	1	1	2
8	América	1	2	3
3	Toluca	1	3	4
7	Atlante	1	2	3
4	Santos	0	3	3
5	Atlas	1	1	2

Semifinals
1	Tecos	3	1	4
8	América	2	2	4
3	Toluca	0	1	1
4	Santos	2	0	2

Finals
1	Tecos	0	2	2
4	Santos	1	0	1

=== Repechaje round ===
April 7, 1994
16:00

Morelia	2-2	Guadalajara
Vera 8'; Pérez 16'		Vázquez 44'; García 73'

Estadio Morelos, Morelia
April 10, 1994
12:00

Guadalajara	2-3	Morelia
Arellano 64'; Galindo 85'		Vera 38', 59'; Figueroa 81'

Estadio Jalisco, Guadalajara

Morelia won 5-4 on aggregate.

April 6, 1994
20:45

Necaxa	0-2	América
		Martellotto 55' de los Santos 68'

Estadio Azteca, Mexico City
April 10, 1994
12:00

América	2-2	Necaxa
Zague 32', 41'		García Aspe 70'; Ivo Basay 79'

Estadio Azteca, Mexico City

America won 4-2 on aggregate.

=== Quarterfinal ===
April 13, 1994
16:00

Morelia	0–3	Tecos
		Rizo 53', 54'; Ordiales 63'

Estadio Morelos, Morelia
April 16, 1994
20:30

Tecos	3–0	Morelia
Donizete 46', 56'; Gallaga 58'

Estadio Tres de Marzo, Zapopan

Tecos won 6-0 on aggregate.

April 13, 1994
20:45

América	1–1	Cruz Azul
Taboada 65' (own)		Mora 63'

Estadio Azteca, Mexico City
April 17, 1994
12:00

Cruz Azul	1–2	América
Hermosillo 49'		Santos 44'; Uribe 87'

Estadio Azteca, Mexico City

América won 2-3 on aggregate.

April 13, 1994
20:45

Atlas	1–0	Santos Laguna
Chávez 12'

Estadio Jalisco, Guadalajara
April 17, 1994
16:00

Santos Laguna	3–1	Atlas
Adomaitis 49', 52'; Guzmán 73'		Pacheco 63'

Estadio Corona, Torreón

Santos Laguna won 3-2 on aggregate.

April 14, 1994
20:45

Atlante	1–1	Toluca
Trapasso 83'		Tinoco 42'

Estadio Azulgrana, Mexico City
April 17, 1994
11:00

Toluca	3–2	Atlante
Bernal 43'; Rodríguez 61'; Abundis 73'		Graniolatti 21'; Salvador 79'

Estadio La Bombonera, Toluca

Toluca won 4-3 on aggregate.

=== Semifinal ===
April 20, 1994
20:45

América	2–3	Tecos
Zague 56'; Farfán 67'		Donizete 24'; Gonçalves 76'; Jiménez 80'

Estadio Azteca, Mexico City
April 23, 1994
20:30

Tecos	1–2	América
Zwaricz 72'		Hernández 20'; Uribe 61'

Estadio Tres de Marzo, Zapopan

Aggregate tied 4-4. Tecos won the series because the team had a better position in general table

April 21, 1994
16:00

Santos Laguna	2–0	Toluca
Adomaitis 22'; Guzmán 76'

Estadio Corona, Torreón
April 24, 1994
11:00

Toluca	1–0	Santos Laguna
Mercado 29'

Estadio La Bombonera, Toluca

Santos Laguna won 1-2 on aggregate.

=== Final ===
April 27, 1994
16:00

Santos Laguna	1-0	Tecos
Adomaitis 81' (pen.)	Report

Estadio Corona, Torreón
April 30, 1994
20:30

Tecos	2-0 (a.e.t.)	Santos Laguna
Jesús Gómez 22' (own); Donizette 97'	Report

Estadio Tres de Marzo, Zapopan

Tecos won 2-1 on aggregate

1993-94 winners

1st title

== Relegation table ==
Pos.	Team	Pts.	Pld.	Ave.	GD.
16.	Morelia	104	114	0.9123	-25
17.	Toros Neza-Hidalgo	31	38	0.8158	-23
18.	UAT	91	114	0.7982	-37
19.	U. de G.	86	114	0.7544	-58
20.	Querétaro	85	114	0.7456	-59
