= 1992–93 Mexican Primera División season =

51st professional season of the top-flight football league in Mexico

Primera División de México
- Season: 1992–93
- Champions: Atlante (2nd title)
- Relegated: Pachuca
- Champions' Cup: Atlante; Monterrey
- CONCACAF Cup Winners Cup: Monterrey
- Matches: 398
- Goals: 1,063 (2.67 per match)

The following are statistics about Primera División de México for the 1992–93 season.

== Overview ==
It was contested by 20 teams, and Atlante won the championship.

Pachuca, who was promoted from Segunda División the previous season, was relegated.

=== Teams ===
Location of the 1992-93 Primera División teams

Team	City	Stadium
América	Mexico City	Azteca
Atlante	Mexico City	Azulgrana
Atlas	Guadalajara, Jalisco	Jalisco
Cruz Azul	Mexico City	Azteca
Guadalajara	Guadalajara, Jalisco	Jalisco
León	León, Guanajuato	Nou Camp
Morelia	Morelia, Michoacán	Morelos
Monterrey	Monterrey, Nuevo León	Tecnológico
Necaxa	Mexico City	Azteca
Pachuca	Pachuca, Hidalgo	Revolución Mexicana / Hidalgo
Puebla	Puebla, Puebla	Cuauhtémoc
Querétaro	Querétaro, Querétaro	Corregidora
Santos Laguna	Torreón, Coahuila	Corona
Tecos	Zapopan, Jalisco	Tres de Marzo
Toluca	Toluca, State of Mexico	La Bombonera
UANL	Monterrey, Nuevo León	Universitario
UAT	Ciudad Victoria, Tamaulipas	Marte R. Gómez
UdeG	Guadalajara, Jalisco	Jalisco
UNAM	Mexico City	Olímpico Universitario
Veracruz	Veracruz, Veracruz	Luis "Pirata" Fuente

== Group stage ==
=== Group 1 ===
Pos	Team	Pld	W	D	L	GF	GA	GD	Pts	Qualification
1	Atlante	38	14	13	11	66	55	+11	41	Playoff
2	Veracruz	38	14	9	15	56	56	0	37	Playoff
3	Santos	38	7	14	17	34	61	−27	28	
4	Querétaro	38	10	7	21	30	54	−24	27	
5	Correcaminos	38	6	12	20	27	55	−28	24	

=== Group 2 ===
Pos	Team	Pld	W	D	L	GF	GA	GD	Pts	Qualification
1	Necaxa	38	23	8	7	76	43	+33	54	Playoff
2	América	38	18	11	9	51	46	+5	47	Playoff
3	Tecos	38	15	16	7	43	32	+11	46	Playoff
4	Puebla	38	16	11	11	58	56	+2	43	
5	Morelia	38	8	14	16	43	61	−18	30	

=== Group 3 ===
Pos	Team	Pld	W	D	L	GF	GA	GD	Pts	Qualification
1	Cruz Azul	38	17	10	11	70	45	+25	44	Playoff
2	UANL	38	14	16	8	57	52	+5	44	Playoff
3	Atlas	38	12	13	13	48	50	−2	37	
4	Guadalajara	38	11	11	16	43	54	−11	33	
5	U. de G.	38	8	14	16	35	54	−19	30	

=== Group 4 ===
Pos	Team	Pld	W	D	L	GF	GA	GD	Pts	Qualification or relegation
1	León	38	17	13	8	64	38	+26	47	Playoff
2	Monterrey	38	15	15	8	51	39	+12	45	Playoff
3	UNAM	38	17	10	11	70	53	+17	44	Playoff
4	Toluca	38	9	14	15	49	50	−1	32	
5	Pachuca	38	10	7	21	39	56	−17	27	Relegated

== Results ==
Home \ Away	AME	ATE	ATS	CAZ	GDL	LEO	MTY	MOR	NEC	PAC	PUE	QRO	SAN	TEC	TOL	UNL	UAT	UDG	UNM	VER
América	—	0–2	2–0	3–1	2–1	2–1	0–0	2–1	1–0	2–0	3–4	1–0	2–2	2–1	3–3	0–1	1–0	1–0	2–2	1–0
Atlante	1–1	—	1–2	2–4	5–1	0–1	1–1	2–0	1–2	5–2	2–1	0–0	3–1	2–0	3–2	1–1	3–0	1–0	3–3	1–3
Atlas	1–1	2–2	—	0–3	2–1	1–3	0–0	1–1	2–1	1–1	2–1	0–1	1–0	2–3	1–0	1–1	2–0	0–0	1–0	1–1
Cruz Azul	1–1	1–2	2–0	—	4–2	2–1	1–2	2–2	3–4	4–2	0–1	6–0	3–1	5–1	0–0	4–2	1–1	1–2	2–0	3–1
Guadalajara	1–0	3–3	1–1	2–2	—	0–0	0–0	1–1	0–2	2–0	0–1	0–2	0–0	0–1	0–0	1–2	1–0	1–1	3–2	3–0
León	1–1	3–1	0–1	3–1	0–2	—	3–2	2–2	1–0	0–1	2–1	5–0	7–1	1–1	3–2	0–0	4–0	1–0	3–2	4–0
Monterrey	3–1	1–2	1–1	0–2	2–2	1–1	—	2–1	1–0	2–1	0–1	2–0	3–2	0–0	2–2	1–0	1–0	5–1	3–1	1–1
Morelia	1–2	1–1	2–1	0–0	0–2	1–1	1–1	—	2–2	1–0	2–0	0–0	3–0	1–1	2–2	1–2	4–1	2–1	2–5	2–1
Necaxa	1–0	3–2	4–3	0–0	3–1	3–0	2–1	5–1	—	2–0	4–1	2–1	2–1	4–0	2–1	2–2	3–1	2–1	0–0	1–1
Pachuca	5–0	0–2	2–1	0–1	0–1	1–1	1–1	3–1	3–4	—	0–1	1–0	2–0	0–0	3–2	1–0	1–0	0–0	0–2	0–0
Puebla	0–0	0–0	1–4	0–0	4–1	1–1	1–0	3–1	2–3	3–1	—	2–1	3–1	2–1	3–3	1–3	1–1	2–0	3–0	2–0
Querétaro	1–2	1–1	2–1	2–1	1–2	1–4	0–1	4–0	1–0	1–0	2–2	—	0–0	0–0	3–1	0–2	3–0	1–1	1–3	0–3
Santos	1–3	2–1	0–0	1–0	2–0	0–0	0–3	1–1	0–3	2–1	2–2	0–1	—	1–1	1–1	2–1	0–0	1–1	1–1	2–1
Tecos	1–0	2–0	0–2	1–1	1–0	1–1	1–1	2–0	0–0	1–0	1–1	3–0	3–0	—	0–0	2–1	1–0	3–0	0–1	1–0
Toluca	1–2	3–1	5–0	0–1	2–0	0–0	1–1	0–0	1–0	2–3	4–0	2–0	0–1	1–2	—	2–1	2–0	0–0	1–3	1–1
UANL	2–2	3–3	1–0	2–2	3–1	1–1	1–2	2–0	2–2	3–2	1–1	1–0	0–0	1–1	2–0	—	0–0	4–3	2–2	2–1
UAT	0–1	0–2	1–1	0–2	1–1	1–2	2–2	2–1	2–0	0–0	2–4	2–0	2–1	0–0	0–0	0–0	—	3–1	2–0	1–3
U. de G.	1–1	1–0	0–7	3–1	2–1	1–0	0–1	1–2	0–3	2–0	1–1	1–0	1–1	1–1	0–1	1–1	0–0	—	1–1	1–1
UNAM	2–3	3–3	2–2	1–0	1–2	3–2	3–0	1–0	2–3	2–1	3–1	1–0	2–1	1–1	4–0	6–0	3–0	1–0	—	1–1
Veracruz	3–0	1–1	3–0	0–3	1–3	0–1	2–1	2–0	2–2	2–1	4–0	1–0	3–2	0–1	2–1	3–4	3–2	2–5	3–0	—

Updated to match(es) played on 2 May 1993. Source: RSSSF
Legend: Blue = home team win; Yellow = draw; Red = away team win.

== Playoff ==
=== Repechaje round ===
- Veracruz 1-1; 0-1 Tecos
- UANL 3-0; 1-4 UNAM

Quarter-finals
3	América	3	3	6
6	Cruz Azul	0	4	4
4	Tecos	1	1	2
5	Monterrey	4	1	5
2	León	2	4	6
8	UANL	0	2	2
1	Necaxa	2	0	2
10	Atlante	4	1	5

Semi-finals
3	América	0	0	0
5	Monterrey	1	0	1
2	León	1	1	2
10	Atlante	1	3	4

Final
5	Monterrey	0	0	0
10	Atlante	1	3	4

=== Final ===
May 26, 1993
20:45

Atlante	1–0	Monterrey
Daniel Guzmán 54'	Report

Estadio Azteca, Mexico City
Attendance: 70,000
Referee: Bonifacio Núñez Vega

May 29, 1993
17:00

Monterrey	0–3	Atlante
	Report	Wilson Graniolatti 40'; Daniel Guzmán 76', 86'

Estadio Tecnológico, Monterrey
Attendance: 35,000
Referee: Arturo Brizio

Atlante won 4–0 on aggregate.

1992–93 winners

2nd title

== Relegation table ==
Pos.	Team	Pts.	Pld.	Ave.	GD.
16.	U. de G.	100	114	0.8772	-30
17.	UAT	99	114	0.8684	-31
18.	Querétaro	88	114	0.7895	-45
19.	Santos Laguna	88	114	0.7895	-54
20.	Pachuca	27	38	0.7105	-27
