= Apud =

Apud may refer to:

== People ==
- Alejandro Apud, Uruguayan football manager
- Antonio Apud, Argentine footballer

== Other ==
- APUD cells, a group of endocrine cells
