= Nicolás Ramírez (Mexican footballer) =

Mexican footballer (born 1974)

Personal information
- Full name: Edgar Nicolás Ramírez Ceceña
- Date of birth: February 16, 1974 (age 52)
- Place of birth: Tepic, Mexico
- Height: 1.74 m (5 ft 8 1/2 in)
- Position: Defensive midfielder

Senior career*
Years	Team	Apps	(Gls)
1993–1999	Santos Laguna	120	(9)
1999	Cruz Azul	9	(0)
1999–2000	Toros Neza	10	(1)
2000	Pachuca	8	(0)
2000	Club América	6	(0)
2000–2001	Club León	16	(1)
2001–2002	Club Celaya	35	(2)
2002–2003	Club Puebla	35	(2)
2003–2004	Atlético Morelia	21	(0)
2004–2005	Atlas	21	(0)

International career^{‡}
1997–1998	Mexico	19	(0)
- * Club domestic league appearances and goals as of 16:22, 26 September 2022 (UTC) ‡ National team caps and goals as of 16:22, 26 September 2022 (UTC)

Edgar Nicolás Ramírez Ceceña (born February 16, 1974) is a Mexican former footballer who played as a defensive midfielder.

He started his career playing for Santos Laguna in 1993–94. By the Invierno 1996 season, Ramírez had become a starter in a championship-winning squad that also included Benjamín Galindo, Jared Borgetti, and Gabriel Caballero. Though Ramírez retained his place in defensive midfield in the following seasons, Santos experienced declining results and he transferred to Cruz Azul in 1999. He eventually represented ten different clubs, playing his final match in the top division with Atlas in 2005.

Ramírez also represented Mexico, making 19 international appearances. His first match came at the 1997 U.S. Cup against Denmark on January 17, 1997, a 3–1 victory in San Diego. Although he appeared in several qualifying matches and played all six games at the 1997 Copa America, he was not called up for the 1998 FIFA World Cup. He will also be remembered for his own goal in a World Cup qualifier against the United States on April 20, 1997, in Foxboro, Massachusetts, a match that ended in a 2–2 draw. His last international match occurred in Los Angeles on November 18, 1998, against Guatemala.

He is the brother of the famous international player Ramón Ramírez.
