= Tierra Blanca, Zacatecas =

Coordinates: 22.349°N 102.065°W

The town of Tierra Blanca is located in the municipality of Loreto in the Mexican state of Zacatecas. It has 2137 inhabitants. Tierra Blanca is 2077 meters above sea level. It is also the birthplace of Benjamín "El Maestro" Galindo. Tierra Blanca is also the birthplace of Omar Ortiz, lead singer of Pequeños Musical. Tierra Blanca is a very quiet and rural town. People often emigrate to the United States, to cities such as Los Angeles, Chicago, and Denver. There is also a "Garden", which is also referred to as "El Jardin." This is the setting where concerts, firework shows, etc., take place.
