= Lupe Rubio =

Mexican footballer and manager (born 1966)

Personal information
- Full name: José Guadalupe Rubio Talamantes
- Date of birth: 14 March 1966 (age 60)
- Place of birth: Gómez Palacio, Durango, Mexico
- Position: Defender

Senior career*
Years	Team	Apps	(Gls)
1985–1987	Panteras Torreón		
1987–1997	Santos Laguna		
1997–1998	Toros Neza		
- * Club domestic league appearances and goals

José Guadalupe Rubio Talamantes (born 14 March 1966), known as Lupe Rubio, is a Mexican football manager and former player.

Playing for Santos Laguna, Rubio partnered Pedro Muñoz de la Torre in the center of the club's defense for several seasons during the 1990s. Rubio was a key figure in defense as Santos reached the 1993–94 final and won the 1996 Invierno championship (the club's first title). In total, he scored eleven goals in 181 Primera División appearances for Santos.

After he retired from playing, Rubio was just the seventh Santos player voted as Guerrero de Honor by the readers of El Siglo de Torreón.
