= Marcelo Carracedo =

Argentine footballer

Personal information
- Full name: Marcelo Carracedo
- Date of birth: April 16, 1970 (age 56)
- Place of birth: Buenos Aires, Argentina
- Height: 1.70 m (5 ft 7 in)
- Position: Midfielder

Senior career*
Years	Team	Apps	(Gls)
1989–1990	Estudiantes de La Plata		
1990	Real Murcia		
1990–1992	Fortuna Düsseldorf	46	(2)
1993–1994	FC Tirol		
1994–1995	Santos Laguna		
1996	Atlético Morelia		
1996–1997	Platense		
1997	Avispa Fukuoka		
1998–1999	Rosario Central		
1999–2000	Universidad Católica		

International career
1989	Argentina U20	4	(0)
- * Club domestic league appearances and goals

Marcelo Carracedo (born April 16, 1970, in Buenos Aires, Argentina) is a former Argentine footballer, or soccer player, who played during his career in Argentina, Japan, Chile, Mexico, Spain, Germany and Austria.

== Club statistics ==
Club performance			League		Cup		League Cup		Total	
Season	Club	League	Apps	Goals	Apps	Goals	Apps	Goals	Apps	Goals
Germany			League		DFB-Pokal		DFL-Ligapokal		Total	
1989–90	Fortuna Düsseldorf	Bundesliga	6	0			0	0	6	0
1990–91	Fortuna Düsseldorf	Bundesliga	14	1			0	0	14	1
1991–92	Fortuna Düsseldorf	Bundesliga	26	1			0	0	26	1
Total			46	2			0	0	46	2
Japan			League		Emperor's Cup		J.League Cup		Total	
1997	Avispa Fukuoka	J1 League	5	0	0	0	5	0	10	0
Country	Japan		5	0	0	0	5	0	10	0
Total			51	2	0	0	5	0	56	2
