= Olaf Heredia =

Mexican footballer (born 1957)

Personal information
- Full name: Carlos Olaf Heredia Orozco
- Date of birth: 19 October 1957 (age 69)
- Place of birth: Apatzingán, Mexico
- Height: 1.74 m (5 ft 8 1/2 in)
- Position: Goalkeeper

Senior career*
| Years | Team | Apps | (Gls) |
| 1978–1984 | UNAM | 201 | (0) |
| 1984–1987 | Tigres UANL | 60 | (0) |
| 1987–1990 | Morelia | 114 | (0) |
| 1990–1993 | Cruz Azul | 59 | (0) |
| 1993–1997 | Santos Laguna | 60 | (0) |
| Total | | 494 | (0) |

International career
| 1983–1986 | Mexico | 18 | (0) |

Managerial career
- 2003–2006: UNAM (Assistant)
- 2008–2009: Veracruz (Goalkeeping coach)
- 2014: Sinaloa (Goalkeeping coach)
- 2015–2017: Atlante (Goalkeeping coach)
- 2017–2018: Tampico Madero (Goalkeeping coach)
- 2020–2023: Querétaro (Goalkeeping coach)
- * Club domestic league appearances and goals

Carlos Olaf Heredia Orozco (born 19 October 1957) is a Mexican former professional football goalkeeper who played for Mexico in the 1986 FIFA World Cup. He also played for Tigres UANL and Santos Laguna.

== Career ==
Born in Apatzingán, Heredia was the fifth of seven children and devoted himself to football. He began playing football with UNAM Pumas and made his Mexican Primera División debut against Atlético Potosino in 1978. Heredia would play six seasons with Pumas, and won the 1980–81 Primera title with the club.

After leaving Pumas, Heredia had spells with Tigres UANL, Monarcas Morelia, Cruz Azul and Santos Laguna. Before he retired, he won a second Primera title with Santos in 1996.

After he finished playing football, Heredia became a goalkeeping coach for Pumas. On 2012 he was appointed new Chivas GK coach.
