= Antonio Apud =

Argentine association footballer

Personal information
- Full name: Antonio Apud Nieves
- Date of birth: 17 September 1967 (age 59)
- Place of birth: Argentina
- Position: Midfielder

Senior career*
Years	Team	Apps	(Gls)
1984–1987	Atlético Tucumán	36+	(4+)
1987–1990	Talleres	67	(3)
1990–1992	Boca	41	(1)
1992	Mandiyú	8	(1)
1993–1995	Santos Laguna		
1995–1996	Veracruz		
1996	León		
- * Club domestic league appearances and goals

Antonio Apud Nieves (born 17 September 1967) is an Argentine former footballer who last played as a midfielder for León.

== Early life ==
Apud was born in 1967 in the El Bosque neighborhood.

== Playing career ==
Apud was nicknamed "El Turco". He started his career with Argentine third-tier side Atlético Tucumán. He was regarded as an important player in the club's promotion to the Argentine second tier. In 1987, he signed for Argentine side Talleres, where he was regarded as an important player for the club. In 1990, he signed for Argentina top flight side Boca, where he played in the Copa Libertadores. In 1996, he signed for Mexican side León, where he was regarded as a "luxury" signing. He retired from professional football after suffering injuries.

== Post-playing career ==
After retiring from professional football, Apud worked as a youth manager.
