= Salvador Mariscal =

Mexican footballer (born 2003)

Personal information
- Full name: Salvador Mariscal Murra
- Date of birth: 22 April 2003 (age 23)
- Place of birth: Torreón, Coahuila, Mexico
- Height: 1.87 m (6 ft 2 in)
- Position: Defensive midfielder

Team information
- Current team: Santos Laguna
- Number: 8

Youth career
- Santos Laguna

Senior career*
| Years | Team | Apps | (Gls) |
| 2023– | Santos Laguna | 72 | (0) |

International career
| 2021–2022 | Mexico U20 | 14 | (4) |
- * Club domestic league appearances and goals as of 21 November 2026

Salvador Mariscal Murra (born 22 April 2003) is a Mexican footballer who plays as a defensive midfielder for Liga MX club Santos Laguna.

== Club career ==
Mariscal started his career with Liga MX club Santos Laguna.

== International career ==
Mariscal was called up to the under-20 team by Luis Ernesto Pérez to participate at the 2021 Revelations Cup, where Mexico won the competition. In June 2022, he was named into the final 20-man roster for the CONCACAF Under-20 Championship, in which Mexico failed to qualify for the FIFA U-20 World Cup and Olympics.

== Personal life ==
He is the son of former football player Salvador Mariscal.

== Career statistics ==
=== Club ===
As of match played on 21 November 2026

| Club | Season | League | | | Cup | | Continental | | Other | | Total | |
| Club | Season | Division | Apps | Goals | Apps | Goals | Apps | Goals | Apps | Goals | Apps | Goals |
|---|---|---|---|---|---|---|---|---|---|---|---|---|
| Santos Laguna | 2022–23 | Liga MX | 11 | 0 | 4 (Note: Appearances in Copa Sky por México) | 0 | — | | — | | 15 | 0 |
| Santos Laguna | 2023–24 | Liga MX | 10 | 0 | — | | — | | — | | 10 | 0 |
| Santos Laguna | 2024–25 | Liga MX | 25 | 0 | — | | — | | 3 (Note: Appearances in Leagues Cup) | 0 | 28 | 0 |
| Santos Laguna | 2025–26 | Liga MX | 18 | 0 | — | | — | | 2 | 0 | 20 | 0 |
| Santos Laguna | 2026–27 | Liga MX | 8 | 0 | — | | — | | 3 | 0 | 11 | 0 |
| Career total | | | 72 | 0 | 4 | 0 | 0 | 0 | 8 | 0 | 84 | 0 |

== Honours ==
Mexico U20

- Revelations Cup: 2021, 2022
