= Daniel Guzmán (footballer) =

Mexican footballer and manager (born 1965)

Personal information
- Full name: Daniel Guzmán Castañeda
- Date of birth: 31 December 1965 (age 60)
- Place of birth: Guadalajara, Jalisco, Mexico
- Position: Striker

Senior career*
| Years | Team | Apps | (Gls) |
| 1984–1991 | UdeG | 153 | (48) |
| 1991–1993 | Atlante | 69 | (41) |
| 1993–1994 | Santos Laguna | 40 | (18) |
| 1994–1996 | Guadalajara | 63 | (19) |
| 1996–1997 | Puebla | 33 | (12) |
| 1997 | San Jose Clash | 3 | (0) |
| 1997–1998 | Atlas | 36 | (16) |
| 1998–1999 | Pachuca | 9 | (0) |

International career
| 1988–1996 | Mexico | 20 | (6) |

Managerial career
- 2002: Guadalajara
- 2003–2004: Veracruz
- 2004: Irapuato
- 2004–2005: UAG
- 2005–2006: Atlas
- 2006: Querétaro
- 2006–2009: Santos Laguna
- 2009–2010: Tigres UANL
- 2012: Puebla
- 2013: Atlante
- 2014–2015: Tijuana
- 2015–2016: UdeG
- 2016–2017: Tampico Madero
- 2021: Guastatoya
- 2023: Tepatitlán
Medal record
Representing Mexico
| Runner-up | Copa América | 1993 |
- * Club domestic league appearances and goals

Daniel Guzmán Castañeda (born 31 December 1965) is a Mexican former professional footballer and manager. Nicknamed "El Travieso," he played for 15 years for various clubs in Mexico. His son Daniel Guzmán Jr. is also a football player.

== Honours ==
=== Player ===
UdeG

- Copa México: 1990–91

Atlante

- Mexican Primera División: 1992–93

=== Manager ===
Santos Laguna

- Mexican Primera División: Clausura 2008

Tigres UANL

- North American SuperLiga: 2009
