= Héctor Adomaitis =

Argentine footballer

Personal information
- Full name: Héctor Raimundo Adomaitis Larrabure
- Date of birth: 12 June 1970 (age 56)
- Place of birth: Temperley, Argentina
- Height: 1.76 m (5 ft 9 in)
- Position: Attacking midfielder

Senior career*
Years	Team	Apps	(Gls)
1987	Temperley		
1988–1990	Montevideo Wanderers		
1991	Deportes Concepción	6	(2)
1991–1993	Colo-Colo	25	(5)
1993–1997	Santos Laguna	139	(30)
1997–2001	Cruz Azul	108	(10)
2000	→ Colo-Colo (loan)	6	(1)
2001–2002	Puebla	36	(3)
2002–2003	Santiago Morning	10	(0)

Managerial career
- 2008–2009: Colo-Colo (assistant)
- 2011– 2013: Santos Laguna (assistant)
- 2015–2016: Tepic (assistant)
- 2018: Deportes Melipilla
- 2019−2021: Deportes Melipilla
- 2021: Barnechea
- 2022: Deportes Santa Cruz
- * Club domestic league appearances and goals

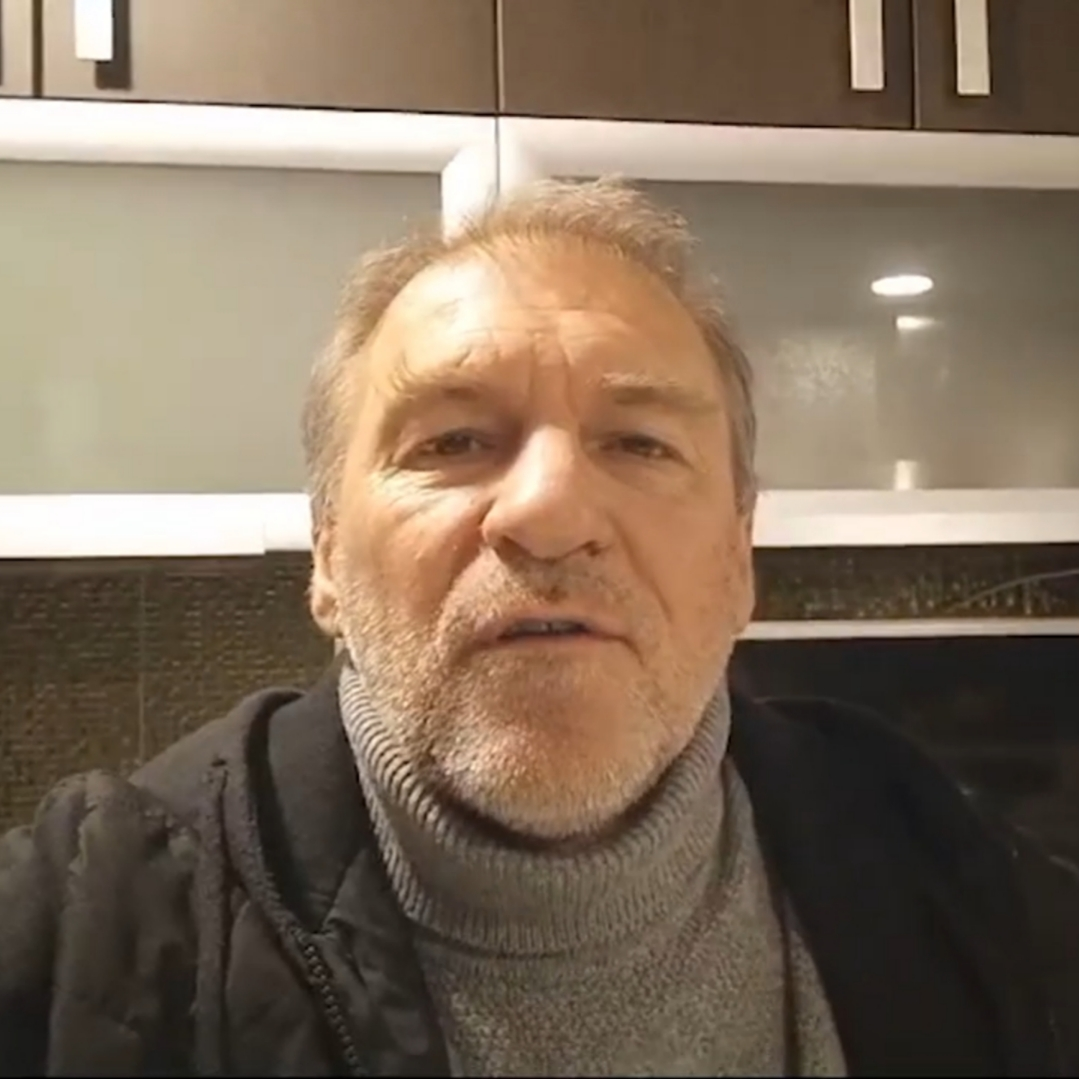

Héctor Raimundo Adomaitis Larrabure (born June 12, 1970) is a former Argentine footballer who played for clubs in Argentina, Uruguay, Mexico and Chile.

== Career ==
Adomaitis began playing football with local side Club Atlético Temperley. In 1991, he moved to Chile and played for Deportes Concepción and Colo-Colo, before moving to Mexico where he would score 55 goals in 291 league matches.

Adomiaitis returned to play for Colo-Colo in 2000.

== Honors ==
=== Player ===
Montevideo Wanderers

- Torneo Competencia: 1990

Colo-Colo

- Primera División de Chile: 1991
- Recopa Sudamericana: 1992
- Copa Interamericana: 1992

Santos Laguna

- Primera División de México: Invierno 1996

Cruz Azul

- Primera División de México: 1997
- CONCACAF Champions Cup: 1996, 1997
- Copa Libertadores runner-up: 2001

=== Manager ===
Colo-Colo

- Primera División de Chile: Clausura 2008

Santos Laguna

- Primera División de México: Clausura 2012
