= Pedro Muñoz (Mexican footballer) =

Mexican footballer and manager (born 1966)

Personal information
- Full name: Pedro Muñoz de la Torre
- Date of birth: 19 October 1966 (age 60)
- Place of birth: Torreón, Coahuila, Mexico
- Height: 1.84 m (6 ft 1/2 in)
- Position: Defender

Senior career*
Years	Team	Apps	(Gls)
1987–2000	Santos Laguna	241	(16)
2001	Querétaro	0	(0)
2002	Tampico Madero	9	(0)
2003–2004	Irapuato	25	(2)

Managerial career
- 2007–2009: Santos Laguna Reserves and Academy
- 2010–2011: Cachorros León
- 2011: León
- 2012: Cachorros León
- 2012–2014: León Reserves and Academy
- 2015: Coras (Assistant)
- 2016: Coras Premier
- 2016: La Piedad
- 2017–2018: Constructores de Gómez Palacio
- 2019–2022: Calor
- * Club domestic league appearances and goals

Pedro Muñoz de la Torre (born October 19, 1966) is a Mexican football manager and former player.
