= Estadio Corona (1970) =

Football stadium in Torreón, Mexico

Corona
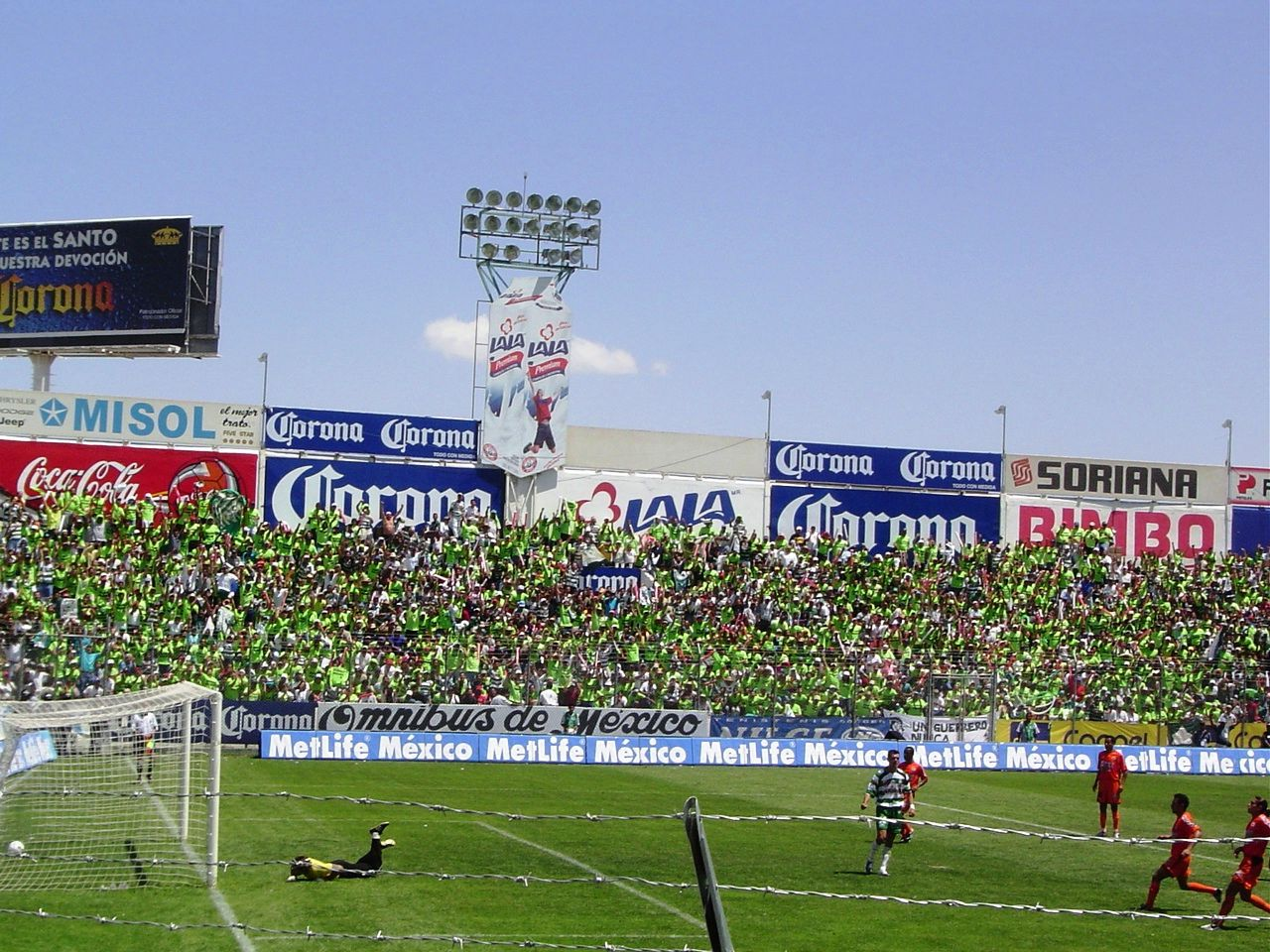
- Interactive map of Corona
- Former names: Moctezuma Stadium
- Location: Torreón, Coahuila
- Coordinates: 25.5550°N 103.4031°W
- Operator: Santos Laguna
- Capacity: 20,100
- Surface: Grass

Construction
- Opened: 2 July 1970
- Closed: 2 November 2009
- Demolished: 2 November 2009

Tenant
- Santos Laguna

The Corona Stadium (the name comes from the beer brand) was one of the smallest football stadiums in Mexico having only capacity for 20,100 seats. It was located in the city of Torreón, Coahuila. This sport facility was used mostly for football games and was the home of the club Santos Laguna. This stadium did not host any FIFA World Cup games because of its limited size and facilities. In 2004, this stadium hosted several games of the Copa Libertadores. The stadium was demolished on 2 November 2009.

== See also ==
- List of football stadiums in Mexico

== Notes ==
- The stadium was nicknamed "La Casa del dolor ajeno" or "The home of strangers pain".
- The stadium was previously the home stadium to the now-defunct Mexican clubs Club de Fútbol Laguna and Club de Fútbol Torreón.
- From its opening in 1970 to 1986, the stadium was known as Estadio Moctezuma.
- The stadium was inaugurated on 2 July 1970 in a friendly match between the now-defunct club Torreon F.C. and Chivas de Guadalajara, the score was three goals to one in favor of the visitors. Francisco Jara was the first goal scorer in this stadium.
- The last official goal recorded at this stadium was scored by Vicente Matías Vuoso at the 66th minute on 1 November 2009.
- The stadium was demolished on 2 November 2009.
- Mexican football legend Hugo Sánchez played his last professional game on 4 May 1997 in this stadium.
