= Santos Laguna =

Association football club in Mexico

- Full name: Club Santos Laguna, S.A. de C.V.
- Nicknames: Guerreros (Warriors); Laguneros (Lakers); Verdiblancos (Green-and-Whites)
- Short name: SAN, CSL
- Founded: 4 September 1983; 43 years ago (as Club Santos IMSS Laguna)
- Stadium: Estadio Corona
- Capacity: 30,000
- Owner: Orlegi Sports
- President: Alejandro Irarragorri Kalb
- Manager: Renato Paiva
- League: Liga MX
- Apertura 2026: Regular phase: 10th of 18; Final phase: Not qualified
- Website: clubsantos.mx
Home colours	Away colours	Third colours

Club Santos Laguna S.A. de C.V., simply known as Santos Laguna or Santos, is a professional football club based in Torreón, Coahuila. The club competes in Liga MX, the highest level of Mexican football, and plays its home matches at Estadio Corona. Founded in 1983 as Club Santos IMSS Laguna by the Mexican Social Security Institute of Durango. The club reached the Primera División in 1988 by acquiring the Ángeles de Puebla franchise. Santos Laguna is one of seven Mexican clubs that have never been relegated.

In domestic competitions, Santos Laguna has won six Liga MX titles, one Copa MX and one Campeón de Campeones. In international competitions, the club finished as runners-up twice in the CONCACAF Champions League.

The club debuted in Primera División in the 1988–89 season, it is the third football club formed in the Comarca Lagunera region, after Laguna (which was moved to Ciudad Nezahualcóyotl, State of Mexico) and CF Torreón (which was moved to Guadalajara, Jalisco). In 2013, it was the fifth most popular club in Mexico.

== History ==
=== Formation and early years ===
Santos Laguna was founded in 1983 by the IMSS of the state of Durango. Since the late 1970s, the IMSS had sponsored a national football tournament with teams from across the country. José Díaz Couder, IMSS head of social services in Gómez Palacio, was invited to participate in the tournaments despite the fact that he did not have a team. He appealed to the players he knew to form a team, based on Asturias F.C.

In 1987, Tuberos de Veracruz, part of the Segunda División de México, was purchased by IMSS and moved to Santa Cruz, Tlaxcala. The first Santos Laguna team spent less than a year in Tlaxcala before moving to Gómez Palacio. A lack of facilities spurred efforts to obtain Moctezuma Stadium (Estadio Corona) in Torreón, owned by John Abusaid, and the Saints made their first home in the former Estadio Corona. On September 4, 1988, the Warriors played their first game as Santos Laguna, winning 2–0.

==== Segunda Division A ====
When the IMSS sold its professional sports clubs, Salvador Necochea Sagi bought Santos Laguna. In their first year in the Segunda División 'A' de México, the Warriors avoided relegation with three wins, two draws and one loss. William (the Clash) Galindo, Carlos González, Julio César Armendáriz, Tomás Moreno and Fernando de la Rosa were notable players.

In 1989, the Warriors earned their nickname when, after a poor start, they finished 10th. Their fan base grew, and the club's owners bought the first Estadio Corona. The club underwent changes the following year, replacing its logo with the current one and playing in green and white stripes. Of the 18 founding members of the Segunda División 'B' de México, two won promotion to the Primera División de México: the Autonomous University of Tamaulipas and Santos Laguna.

=== Promotion to Primera Division ===
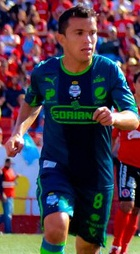
Juan Pablo Rodríguez, footballer with more presences in the history of the club.

In 1988, Santos Laguna purchased the Ángeles de Puebla franchise and relocated it to Torreón, Coahuila, giving them Christian Saavedra, Wilson Graniolatti, Martín Zúñiga and Miguel Herrera and a record of three wins, four draws and one loss. Lucas Ochoa scored the club's first Primera División goal and the Warriors, led by Carlos Ortiz, avoided relegation with Herrera's two goals paving the way for a 3–1 defeat of Atlético Potosino.

In 1991, Grupo Modelo became majority owner of the club and Ramon Ramirez made his Primera División debut with a goal against Club Deportivo Guadalajara. Later, the following year, club president Armando Navarro Gascón and his wife died in a car accident.

President Alberto Cañedo and Chilean coach Pedro García arrived in 1993. Grupo Modelo made a strong investment in reinforcements, Antonio "El Turco" Apud, Daniel Guzmán, Olaf Heredia, Diego Silva, Héctor Adomaitis and Richard Zambrano who joined players coming from the Segunda División such as José Guadalupe Rubio and Pedro Muñoz. The 1993–94 season saw the team for the first time qualify for the playoffs in the Primera División and managed to reach the final coinciding with their tenth anniversary of founding, though lost in overtime in the second leg of the final against Club Deportivo Estudiantes Tecos who were coached by Victor Manuel Vucetich.

In 1994, key player Ramón Ramírez left for Guadalajara, but Santos qualified for the playoffs a second time. The Warriors participated in the 1995 CONCACAF Champions Cup, and were eliminated in the first round by Deportivo FAS of El Salvador. Argentine Mauro Camoranesi played 13 games with Santos, scoring one goal before returning to Uruguay. Other notable players that season and the following one were Gabriel Caballero, Francisco Gabriel de Anda and Miguel España.

Chilean Cristian Montecinos reached the third league during the 1996 regular season, and Santos Laguna won their first Primera División title with new player Jared Borghetti. In the Verano 1997 tournament, Santos Laguna was eliminated by Guadalajara 5–0 in the Estadio Jalisco. Santos Laguna played poorly in the Invierno 1997 tournament, winning three games out of 17 and tied for last in the standings with Pumas UNAM and Tecos de la U.A.G. In 1998 the club reached one of the two qualifying finals for the Copa Libertadores, which was played on September 9 in Los Angeles.

=== 2000s ===
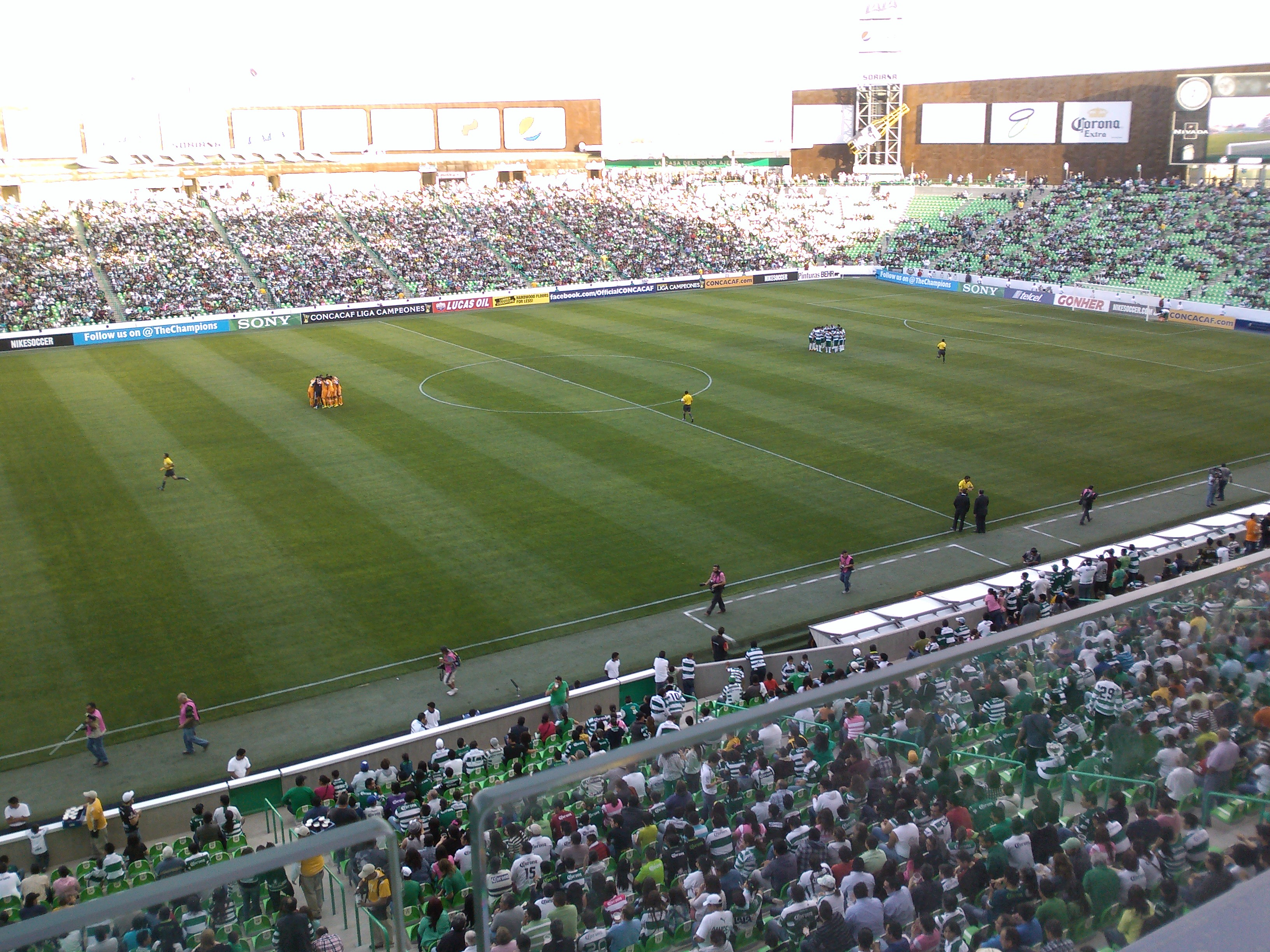
A match between Santos Laguna and Houston Dynamo corresponding to the quarterfinals of the Concacaf Champions League 2012-2013.

In the summer 2000 season, Santos Laguna was strengthened by the arrivals of Rodrigo Ruiz and Luis Romero. During the regular season, the Warriors lost only two games and finished second in the overall standings behind Toluca.

In the 2001 summer season, the club won their second league championship. During the winter 2001 season Santos Laguna, with eight losses, failed to qualify for the playoffs and finished eighth overall. In summer 2002, the Warriors were fourth in the overall standings but were eliminated 1–0 in the semi-finals by Necaxa at the Estadio Corona. Santos Laguna qualified for the CONCACAF Champions Cup that year for the second time. The Warriors defeated Tauro FC of Panama by aggregate score of 5–3; in the next round, at home, Santos Laguna lost 3–2 overall to the U.S. champion Kansas City Wizards. At the end of the summer tournament, Fernando Quirarte and his coaching staff stepped down; Quirarte was replaced by Sergio Bueno, who was soon sacked in favor of Luis Fernando Tena. Finishing eighth overall, Santos Laguna defeated defending champion and leader América 5–4 at the Estadio Azteca. The Warriors qualified for the group stage of the Merconorte Cup, defeating the Kansas City Wizards and Barcelona of Guayaquil twice each and Sporting Cristal once; their only loss was to Sporting Cristal, 2–1.

For the 2003 Apertura tournament (the club's 20th anniversary) reinforcements arrived in the form of Vicente Matías Vuoso and Sixto Peralta, Argentines who had played for Manchester City and Inter Milan. In the match at Estadio Corona against Monterrey, 10 goals were scored. The Warriors qualified for the playoffs, but were eliminated in the quarter-finals, Luis Fernando Tena's contract was not renewed, and he was replaced by Eduardo De la Torre.

The Warriors began 2004 well, qualifying for the Copa Libertadores by defeating Atlas 4–3, but were injured, inconsistent and tired in the Clausura 2004. The club, put up for sale, was in a precarious financial position but played two tournaments and finished 14th overall. In the Copa Libertadores, despite unpaid wages, Santos Laguna ended the group stage undefeated. In the second round, the Warriors were eliminated by River Plate after a struggle.

During the Apertura 2004, the club was abandoned by the Ministry of Finance, who withdrew financial support and returned it to former owner Grupo Modelo with instructions not to invest more money in the franchise until current owner Carlos Ahumada Kurtz solved his legal problems. The club payroll was restructured, players were cut and Santos Laguna did not qualify for the playoffs.

In the Clausura 2005, the Warriors' Vicente Matias Vuoso won the scoring championship with 15 points and Rodrigo Ruiz set a Mexican record for scoring passes with 12 assists. Santos Laguna was plagued by injuries during the Apertura tournament. The Clausura 2006 tournament was disastrous for the club.

Clausura 2008 champions

The Apertura 2007 was one of the team's best seasons. With the arrival of the Ecuadorian Christian Benítez, Santos Laguna lost only one match and was visited by Pelé. For the Clausura 2008, the club scored 36 goals in the regular season. On June 1, 2008 Santos Laguna won their third Clausura championship, defeating Cruz Azul. The club began Apertura 2008 at Estadio Azteca against América.

Clausura 2009 was disastrous for the Warriors; coach Daniel Guzmán was dismissed and replaced by Sergio Bueno, and the club's fortunes improved somewhat. In the CONCACAF Champions League quarter-finals against the Montreal Impact in Montreal's Olympic Stadium before a crowd of 55,571, the Impact surprised and won 2–0. Apertura 2009 opened the Nuevo Estadio Corona; Bueno was dismissed and replaced by Rubén Omar Romano.

=== 2010s ===

Clausura 2012 champions

In 2010, Santos fell just short of the title, losing 4–3 to Toluca. For the Apertura Christian Benítez returned to the club, contributing to their rise to the top of the table and scoring 14 goals. The Warriors lost 3–0 to Monterrey, their second consecutive final loss. In the Clausura Rubén Omar Romano, unpopular with fans, was dismissed on February 20, 2011. Two days later, Diego Cocca debuted as coach in a 2–0 loss to Cruz Azul. Cocca lost his first six games before a 3–0 Week 12 victory over Cruz Azul, and the team did not qualify for the playoffs.

Cocca began Apertura 2011 with the support of the board and players, but was dismissed on September 3 and Eduardo Rergis became the interim coach. On September 12, Benjamín Galindo was appointed as new coach, with Héctor López his assistant. Under Galindo, Santos won five consecutive games and reached fourth place.

In the 2011–12 CONCACAF Champions League, Santos defeated the Seattle Sounders FC in the quarter-finals and Toronto FC in the semi-finals. In the final, the club lost to Rayados de Monterrey. In the Clausura 2012, Santos Laguna finished in first place for the second time in its history. In the quarter-finals, the club won 6–4 on aggregate. The first game of the semi-finals, against the Tigres UANL at the Estadio Universitario, ended in a 1–1 draw and Santos won the second game to advance to the final. After playing Monterrey to a 1–1 draw at Estadio Tecnológico, Santos Laguna won the second game 2–1 with goals by Daniel Ludueña and Oribe Peralta for the club's fourth title.

The Apertura 2012 featured Edgar Gerardo Lugo and rising defensive stars Monarcas Morelia and Oswaldo Alanis. However, Santos did not qualify for the playoffs and was unable to repeat its championship. At the end of the season, Benjamín Galindo sacked his two assistants before he himself was dismissed.

In the Clausura 2013, Portuguese manager Pedro Caixinha was hired based on a recommendation by former Real Madrid coach José Mourinho. Daniel Ludueña and Christian Suárez were transferred to Pachuca in exchange for Mauro Cejas, Néstor Calderón and promising Colombian Andrés Rentería. Santos Laguna finished sixth during the regular season. They defeated Atlas 3–1 on aggregate in the quarter-finals and lost to Cruz Azul 0–3 and 2–1 in the semi-finals. In the 2012–13 CONCACAF Champions League, Santos again reached the final against Club de Fútbol Monterrey. The first game was a scoreless tie, and Monterrey won the second game 4–2.

For the Apertura 2013, Santos sold Iván Estrada to Pachuca and transferred Herculez Gomez, Gerardo Lugo and Aaron Galindo. After the June purchase of Grupo Modelo by Belgian-Brazilian company AB InBev, on August 8 Grupo Modelo announced the sale of Santos Laguna to new company Orlegi Sports (led by Alejandro Irarragorri and other Mexican businessmen). The new owners said that they would continue their sponsorship.

After defeating Atlante 3–1 in the latter half of the Apertura 2013, Santos Laguna secured a berth in the Copa Libertadores for the second time in their history. Los Guerreros finished undefeated at the top of Group 8, which included Copa Argentina winners Arsenal de Sarandí, Uruguayan league champions Peñarol and Venezuelan league runners-up Deportivo Anzoátegui. In the away leg of the Round of 16, Santos Laguna faced Argentinian side Lanús, which they lost 2-1. Darwin Quintero scored the only goal for Los Laguneros. The Warriors sealed their elimination by losing 2-0 in the home leg after Ismael Blanco and Paolo Goltz scored for the Argentinian side. Following the two clashes in the tournament, several Lanús players were transferred to Santos Laguna in the latter months of the year, namely defender Carlos Izquierdoz, midfielder Diego "Pulpo" González and goalkeeper Agustín Marchesín.

In the Clausura 2015, Santos rebounded from a six-match losing streak to qualify for the playoffs. The club defeated top-ranked Tigres UANL 2–1 on aggregate to reach the semi-finals. They faced another favorite, Chivas del Guadalajara, whom they defeated 3–0 on aggregate. In the finals they faced Gallos Blancos del Querétaro in their first Liga MX final. Santos defeated Querétaro in the first leg of the finals at Territorio Santos Modelo with a record-breaking score of 5–0; Javier "Chuletita" Orozco scored four of the goals. In the second leg, at Estadio Corregidora, Gallos won 3–0 but Santos won their fifth championship 5–3 on aggregate.

In the Clausura 2018 tournament, under the management of former goalkeeper Robert Dante Siboldi, Santos Laguna earned twenty-nine points, tied with América and Monterrey, but placed fourth due to goal difference. In the playoffs, the team faced defending champions Tigres UANL and lost 2-0 in the first leg of the quarterfinals. In the second leg, Santos Laguna played with ten players for most of the match as Jonathan Rodriguez was sent off in the 28th minute but managed to win 2-0 and advance to the semi-finals. At this stage, the Warriors defeated América 6-3 on aggregate and qualified for the finals against league leader Toluca. In the final first leg, played in Estadio Corona, both Djaniny Tavares and Julio Furch netted for Santos Laguna, helping the team defeat Toluca 2-1. In the second leg, Furch scored in the 10th minute but Toluca's Gabriel Hauche levelled in the final minutes of the match, which finished 1-1. Santos Laguna earned its sixth league title, whilst Djaniny Tavares finished the tournament as the top goal scorer, netting fourteen times, the eighth time a Santos Laguna player has achieved this feat.

The team qualified for the sixth time for the CONCACAF Champions League, in the 2019 edition. In the Round of 16, Los Guerreros achieved an 11-2 win on aggregate against Honduran side Marathón. In the following stage, Santos Laguna defeated the New York Red Bulls in both legs, by 2-0 and 4-2 respectively. In the semi-finals, however, the team lost 5-3 on aggregate against Tigres UANL and failed to advance to the finals.

== Notable players ==
=== 1993–94 Runners-up ===
In the first leg, the team defeated Tecos de la U.A.G. 1–0 at Corona Stadium; in the second leg, they lost 2–0 at 3 de Marzo Stadium.

==== Squad ====
- (Mexico) Adrián Marmolejo
- (Mexico) Ramón Ramírez
- (Argentina) Hector Adomaitis
- (Mexico) Diego Silva
- (Argentina) Antonio Apud
- (Mexico) Daniel Guzmán
- (Chile) Richard Zambrano
- (Mexico) Felipe de Jesús Amezcua
- (Mexico) José Antonio Alcántara
- (Mexico) Jesús Gómez
- (Brazil) Ricardo Wagner de Souza
- (Mexico) Pedro Muñoz

=== Invierno 1996 champions ===
In Invierno 1996 Santos Laguna won its first title, defeating Necaxa 4–3 on aggregate (first leg 0–1 and second leg 4–2). The winning goal was controversial, with Jared Borgetti allegedly offside.

==== Squad ====
- (Mexico) José Miguel
- (Mexico) Francisco Gabriel de Anda
- (Mexico) Pedro Muñoz
- (Mexico) José Guadalupe Rubio
- (Brazil) Ricardo Wagner de Souza
- (Mexico) Nicolás Ramírez
- (Mexico) Miguel España
- (Mexico) Benjamín Galindo
- (Argentina) Héctor Adomaitis
- (Mexico) Jared Borgetti
- (Argentina) Gabriel Caballero
- (Mexico) Francisco Del Río

=== Verano 2001 champions ===
In Verano 2001, Santos Laguna won its second title 4–3 on aggregate (first leg 1–2, second leg 3–1) against Pachuca.

==== Squad ====
- (Mexico) Adrián Martínez
- (Mexico) Héctor Altamirano
- (Mexico) Héctor López
- (Mexico) Miguel Ángel Carreón
- (Mexico) Mariano Trujillo
- (Mexico) Carlos Cariño
- (Mexico) Luis Romero
- (Mexico) Johan Rodríguez
- (Chile) Rodrigo Ruiz
- (Mexico) Joaquín Reyes Chávez
- (Mexico) Jared Borgetti
- (Brazil) Guto
- (Brazil) Róbson Luíz
- (Uruguay) Luis Fernando Soto
- (Mexico) Ignacio Vázquez
- (Mexico) Enrique Vizcarra

=== Clausura 2008 champions ===
In Clausura 2008 Santos became champions by defeating Monterrey in Monterrey, Nuevo León with a last-minute goal in the semi-finals and Cruz Azul by an aggregate score of 3–2.

==== Squad ====
- (Mexico) Oswaldo Sánchez
- (Mexico) Iván Estrada
- (Mexico) Rafael Figueroa
- (Argentina) Fernando Ortiz
- (United States) Edgar Castillo
- (Mexico) Osmar Mares
- (Mexico) Juan Pablo Santiago
- (Mexico) Johnny García
- (Mexico) Jorge Barrera
- (Mexico) Juan Pablo Rodríguez
- (Mexico) Fernando Arce
- (Mexico) Francisco Torres
- (Argentina) Walter Jiménez
- (Argentina) Daniel Ludueña
- (Ecuador) Christian Benítez
- (Argentina) Vicente Matías Vuoso
- (Mexico) Oribe Peralta
- (Mexico) Agustín Herrera

=== Clausura 2012 champions ===
In Clausura 2012 Santos won their fourth championship, defeating Tigres UANL in the semi-finals with two last-minute goals, and defeating Monterrey in the finals with an aggregate score of 3–2.

==== Squad ====
- (Mexico) Oswaldo Sánchez
- (Mexico) Iván Estrada
- (Panama) Felipe Baloy
- (Mexico) Aarón Galindo
- (Mexico) Osmar Mares
- (Spain) Marc Crosas
- (Mexico) Rodolfo Salinas
- (Colombia) Carlos Darwin Quintero
- (Mexico) Juan Pablo Rodríguez
- (Argentina) Daniel Ludueña
- (Mexico) Oribe Peralta
- (Mexico) César Ibáñez
- (Mexico) Rafael Figueroa
- (Mexico) Cándido Ramírez
- (United States) Herculez Gomez

== Sponsors ==
Year	Manufacturer	Sponsor
1988–89	Adidas	Coca-Cola
1989–90	Pepín	Martí
1990–91	Pepín	
1991–92	Topper	Quesos La Risueña
1992–1994	Pony	Coca-Cola
1994–1996	Aba Sport	Corona Extra
1996–2000	Corona Sport	Corona Extra
2000–2002	Corona Sport	Soriana
2002–2010	Atletica	Soriana
2011–2018	Puma	Soriana
2018–2026	Charly	Soriana
2026	Kelme	Soriana

Other sponsors: Corona Extra, Grupo Lala, Industrias Peñoles, Caliente.mx, Omnibus de México, SIMSA, Sanatorio Español, Totalplay, Grupo Peñafiel, Pinturas Berel, Burger King, AeroMéxico, Nivada Swiss, United Way, Greening Group, D'Alis Pastelería, Grupo Alameda, Inteligis Sports Lighting Group and Stori Card.

Santos Laguna has always worn green, with white or black accessories. Their uniform originated after the acquisition of Ángeles de Puebla from the city of Puebla, Puebla and the relocation of that team to Torreón, Coahuila, and their sponsorship by the Mexican Social Security Institute during the 1983–84 season.

The first home uniform was white with green sleeves and a green vertical stripe, green shorts and socks; the away uniform was white, in tribute to Club Torreón. In 1986, they adopted a home uniform of green-and-white horizontal stripes, green shorts and white socks and a white-and-green away uniform. In 2000, Santos Laguna signed a sponsorship agreement with Soriana.

=== Kit ===
1983–84	1988–89	1996–97	2000–01	2007–08	2008–09	2009–10

2010	2011	2012	2013	30th-anniversary edition	2014

== Grounds ==
=== Corona Stadium ===
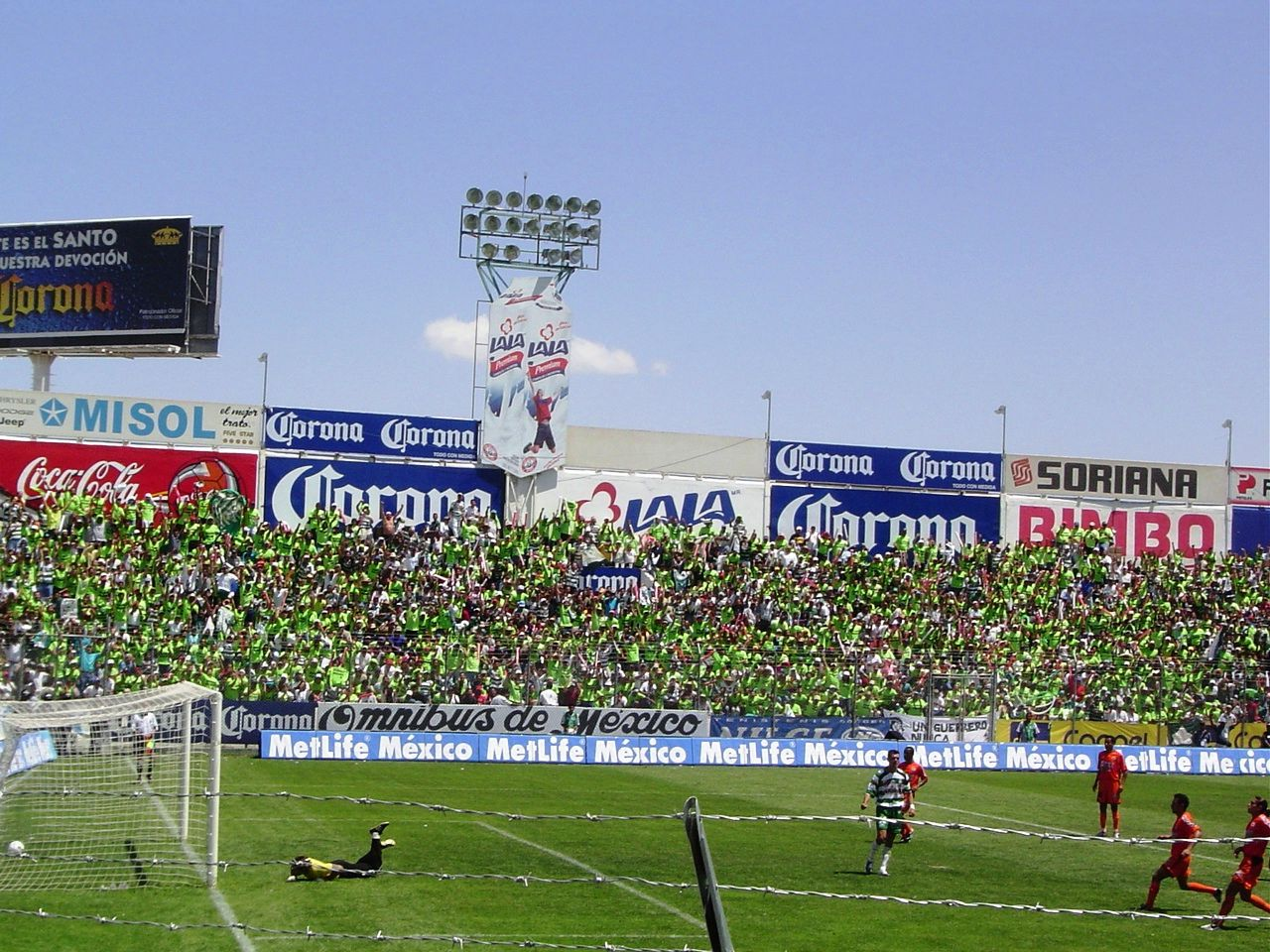
Old Corona Stadium (1970-2009)

Corona Stadium, in Torreón, Coahuila, was one of the smallest football stadiums in Mexico with a capacity of 20,100. Known as Montezuma Stadium, it opened on July 2, 1970, for a friendly match between the now-defunct CF Torreón and Guadalajara. The stadium was demolished on November 2, 2009.

=== New Corona Stadium ===
Santos Laguna plays at the $100 million Estadio Corona, with a capacity of 30,050. Construction began on February 22, 2008, and on November 11, 2009, the stadium opened for a friendly match between Santos Laguna and Santos FC from the Brazilian Série A. The sellout crowd included Mexican president Felipe Calderón and Brazilian legend Pelé. Santos Laguna won, 2–1.

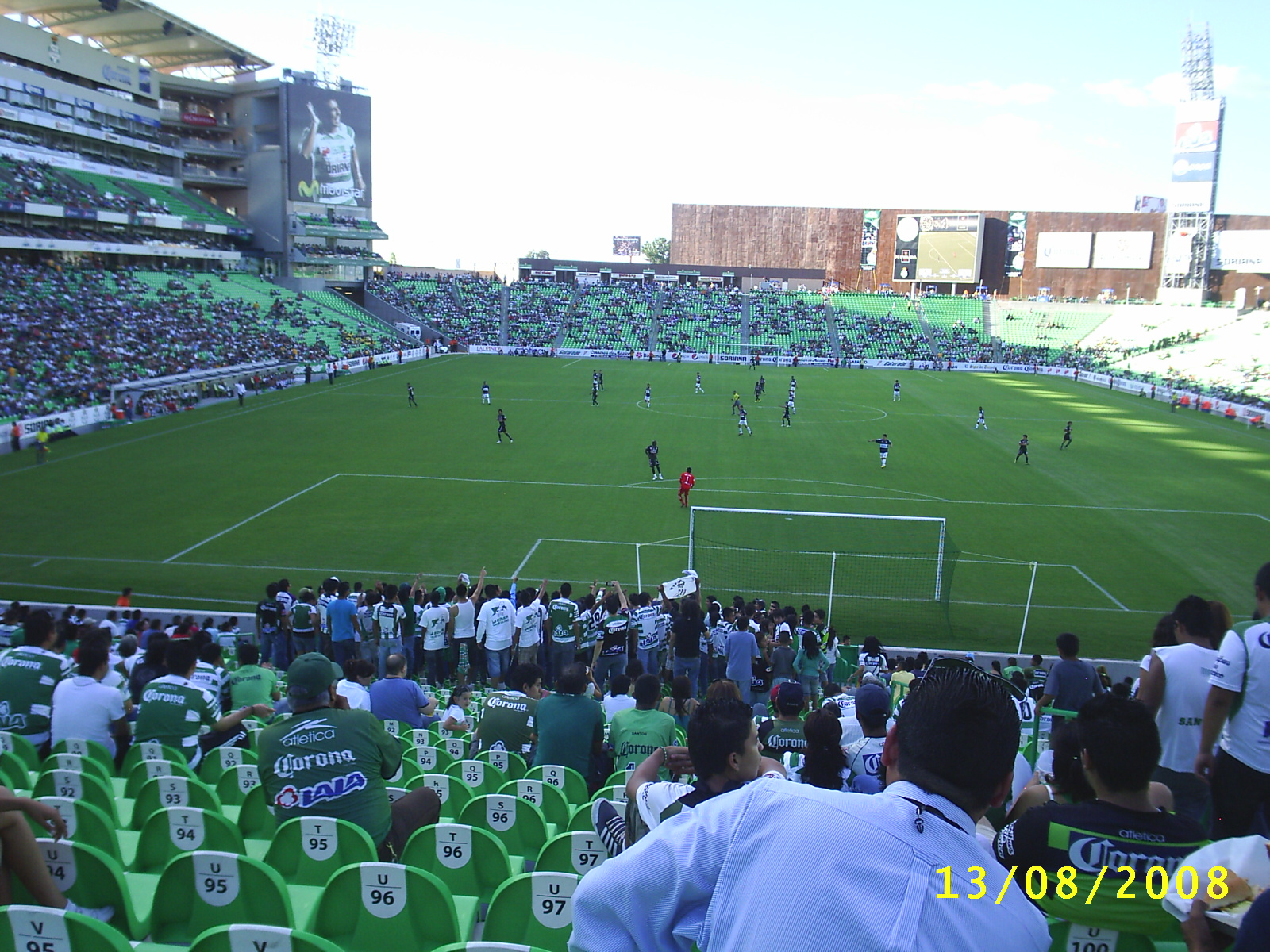
New Corona Stadium (2009-present)

== Symbols ==
=== Insignia ===
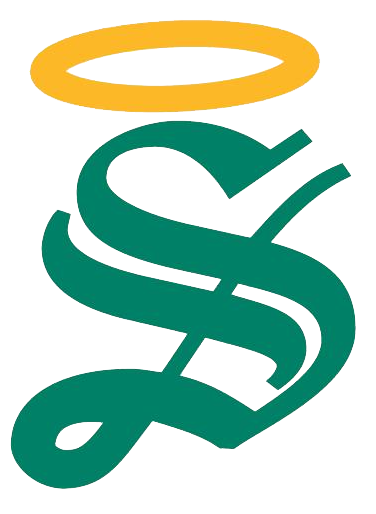
Club logo

Santos Laguna's home colors are green and white. When Santos Laguna was founded in 1983, its crest was white with green stripes and letters (similar to that of Santos FC). In 1991, when Grupo Modelo bought the club, the crest became similar to the current one. In 1996, a star was added to the badge after winning their first title in the Invierno 1996 tournament. After winning their second title in 2001, another star was added and switched to a darker shade of green with a black outline. As of 2012, the stars have been placed outside of the badge. In 2018, the club used a special badge, incorporating the number '35' for the club's 35th anniversary. A sixth star was added after winning the Clausura 2018 tournament.

=== Songs ===
In 1991, when the club was in danger of relegation to the second division, Santos adopted their first team song: "Es hora de ganar", by Ricardo Serna. In April 1994, Serna wrote "Santos Campeon". Two years later, Chilean composer Martin Ibarreche Wilt Labarca was commissioned to write "Verdiblanco el corazon". In 1997 Serna wrote "Hymn to the Fans", and in May 2001 the club introduced "Venceremos". Yahir of La Academia sang a song celebrating the club's 25th anniversary.

== Partnerships ==
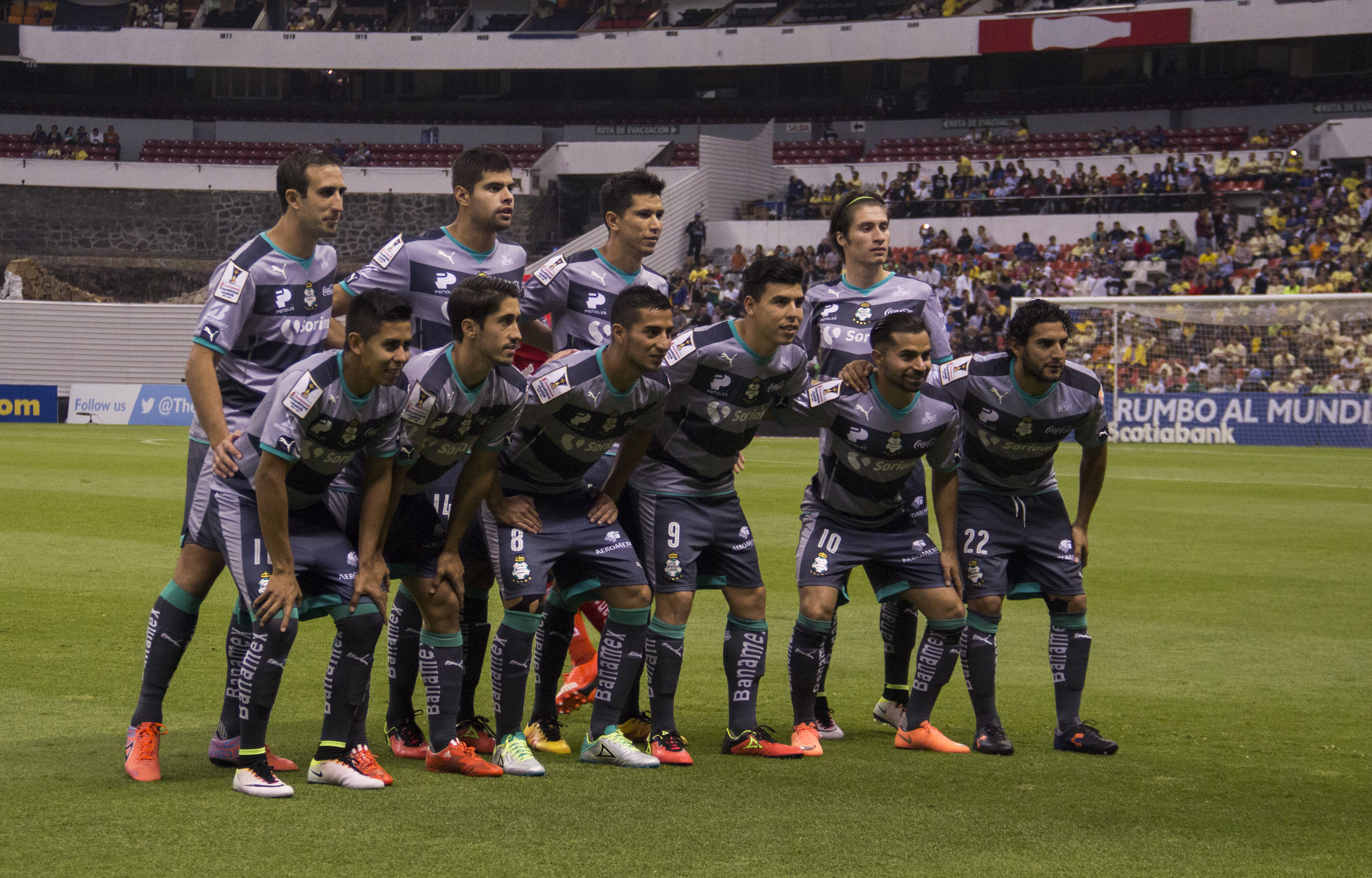
Santos playing the second leg of the semifinal of the Concacaf Champions League against America in 2016.

On December 9, 2010, Santos formed a partnership with Scottish champions Celtic. Like Celtic, Santos wear a green-and-white hooped kit and the clubs regularly mention each other on Twitter and Facebook. On January 10, 2013, Santos formed a partnership with Atlético Nacional.

== Rivalries ==
Santos has a regional rivalry with state neighbors Monterrey, with whom they played finals in the Primera División de México and two finals in the CONCACAF Champions League. To a lesser extent Santos also has a rivalry with Tigres UANL.

== Honours ==
Domestic
Type	Competition	Titles	Seasons	Runners-up
Top level FMF	Liga MX	6	Inv–1996, Ver–2001, Cla–2008, Cla–2012, Cla–2015, Cla–2018	1993–94, Ver–2000, Bic–2010, Ape–2010, Ape–2011, Guard–2021
Top level FMF	Copa MX	1	Ape–2014	—
Top level FMF	Campeón de Campeones	1	2015	2018
International
Type	Competition	Titles	Seasons	Runners-up
Continental CONCACAF	CONCACAF Champions Cup	0	—	2011–12, 2012–13

== Seasons ==
#	Season	P	W	D	L	GF	GA	DIF	Points	Position	Phase
1	1988–89	38	6	15	17	25	56	−31	33	19	DNQ
2	1989–90	38	11	12	15	38	49	−11	45	15	DNQ
3	1990–91	38	6	14	18	35	53	−18	32	19	DNQ
4	1991–92	38	12	10	16	42	51	−9	46	16	DNQ
5	1992–93	38	7	15	16	35	61	−26	36	17	DNQ
6	1993–94	38	16	13	9	58	56	2	61	4	Runner-up
7	1994–95	36	13	9	14	62	62	0	48	8	Quarter-final
8	1995–96	34	8	11	15	39	43	−4	35	15	DNQ
9	Invierno 1996	17	10	4	3	21	15	6	34	2	Champion
10	Verano 1997	17	8	2	7	27	28	−1	26	7	Quarter-final
11	Invierno 1997	17	3	7	7	22	31	−9	16	18	DNQ
12	Verano 1998	17	8	2	7	24	22	2	26	7	Quarter-final
13	Invierno 1998	17	4	5	8	22	33	−11	17	14	DNQ
14	Verano 1999	17	9	2	6	33	29	4	29	5	Semi-final
15	Invierno 1999	17	5	5	7	27	35	−8	20	14	DNQ
16	Verano 2000	17	8	7	2	31	22	9	31	2	Runner-up
17	Invierno 2000	17	7	5	5	32	29	3	26	6	Semi-final
18	Verano 2001	17	8	4	5	35	27	8	28	2	Champion
19	Invierno 2001	18	7	3	8	36	34	2	24	8	Quarter-final
20	Verano 2002	18	9	4	5	42	31	11	31	4	Semi-final
21	Apertura 2002	19	7	5	7	30	28	2	26	8	Semi-final
22	Clausura 2003	19	9	3	7	30	24	6	30	9	DNQ
23	Apertura 2003	19	8	7	4	41	29	12	31	4	Quarter-final
24	Clausura 2004	19	6	3	10	31	30	1	21	14	DNQ
25	Apertura 2004	17	5	3	9	22	22	0	18	14	DNQ
26	Clausura 2005	17	9	1	7	31	31	0	28	6	Quarter-final
27	Apertura 2005	17	5	5	7	31	31	0	20	11	DNQ
28	Clausura 2006	17	3	9	5	20	25	−5	18	17	DNQ
29	Apertura 2006	17	1	8	8	19	31	−12	11	18	DNQ
30	Clausura 2007	17	6	4	7	21	20	1	22	9	Quarter-final
31	Apertura 2007	17	11	5	1	40	22	18	38	1	Semi-final
32	Clausura 2008	17	8	7	2	36	19	17	31	2	Champion
33	Apertura 2008	17	5	7	5	22	20	2	22	10	Semi-final
34	Clausura 2009	17	5	7	5	25	20	5	22	9	DNQ
35	Apertura 2009	17	7	6	4	29	24	5	27	6	Quarter-final
36	Bicentenario 2010	17	8	4	5	27	25	2	28	5	Runner-up
37	Apertura 2010	17	9	3	5	28	19	9	30	3	Runner-up
38	Clausura 2011	17	7	2	8	23	23	0	23	9	DNQ
39	Apertura 2011	17	8	3	6	29	25	4	27	4	Runner-up
40	Clausura 2012	17	11	3	3	33	18	15	36	1	Champion
41	Apertura 2012	17	6	5	6	22	26	−4	23	9	DNQ
42	Clausura 2013	17	8	5	4	20	13	7	29	6	Semi-final
43	Apertura 2013	17	9	6	2	32	20	12	33	2	Semi-final
44	Clausura 2014	17	6	7	4	33	29	4	25	4	Semi-final
45	Apertura 2014	17	5	8	4	23	24	−1	23	9	DNQ
46	Clausura 2015	17	7	4	6	24	21	3	25	8	Champion
47	Apertura 2015	17	4	5	8	21	24	−3	17	15	DNQ
48	Clausura 2016	17	8	3	6	22	20	2	27	7	Quarter-final
49	Apertura 2016	17	4	4	9	19	30	−11	16	16	DNQ
50	Clausura 2017	17	5	11	1	25	20	5	26	5	Quarter-final
51	Apertura 2017	17	3	9	5	20	23	−3	18	14	DNQ
52	Clausura 2018	17	9	2	6	29	20	9	29	4	Champion
53	Apertura 2018	17	8	6	3	27	18	9	30	4	Quarter-final
54	Clausura 2019	17	6	4	7	21	23	-2	22	11	DNQ
55	Apertura 2019	18	11	4	3	40	25	15	37	1	Quarter-final
56	Clausura 2020	10	5	2	3	14	14	0	17	3	Cancelled
57	GUARD1ANES 2020	17	7	4	6	24	20	4	25	8	DNQ
58	GUARD1ANES 2021	17	7	5	5	18	13	5	26	5	Runner-up
59	Apertura 2021	17	5	9	3	23	16	7	24	5	Quarter-final
60	Clausura 2022	17	5	5	7	25	25	0	20	14	DNQ
61	Apertura 2022	17	10	3	4	38	21	17	33	3	Quarter-final
62	Clausura 2023	17	5	4	8	23	37	-14	19	13	Quarter-final
63	Apertura 2023	17	7	2	8	31	34	-3	23	9	Play-in
64	Clausura 2024	17	4	3	10	15	28	-13	15	15	DNQ
65	Apertura 2024	17	2	4	11	12	30	-18	10	18	DNQ
66	Clausura 2025	17	2	1	14	15	36	-21	7	18	DNQ
67	Apertura 2025	17	6	2	9	22	28	-6	20	11	DNQ

Last updated: 22 April 2025.
Source: Liga MX

== Personnel ==
=== Management ===
Position	Staff
Sporting Chairman	(Mexico) Alejandro Irarragorri Kalb
Director of football	(Mexico) Gonzalo Pineda
Director of sports intelligence	(Mexico) Ricardo Martínez
Director of academy	(Mexico) Omar Tapia

Source: Liga MX

=== Coaching staff ===
Position	Staff
Manager	(Portugal) Renato Paiva
Assistant managers	(Portugal) Miguel dos Santos
Assistant managers	(Brazil) Ygor Vianna
Goalkeeper coach	(Mexico) Mario Rodríguez
Fitness coach	(Mexico) Pedro Anaya
Physiotherapist	(Mexico) Jorge Monárrez
Team doctor	(Mexico) Luis Serratos

=== Managers ===
Date	Name	Date	Name
1988–89	(Mexico) Carlos Ortiz	1989–90	(Mexico) Rubén Maturano
July 1, 1990 – June 30, 1991	(Honduras) Chelato Uclés	1991	(Mexico) José Luis Estrada
1991–92	(Mexico) Rubén Maturano	1992	(Mexico) Ignacio Jáuregui
1992	(Argentina) Pedro Dellacha	1992–93	(Uruguay) Roberto Matosas
1993–94	(Chile) Pedro García	1994–95	(Argentina) Miguel Ángel López
1995–96	(Argentina) Patricio Hernández	1996	(Mexico) José Vantolrá
1996–98	(Mexico) Alfredo Tena	1998	(Argentina) Miguel Ángel López
Jan 1, 1999 – Oct 4, 1999	(Mexico) Juan de Dios Castillo	Oct 8, 1999 – Dec 31, 2001	(Mexico) Fernando Quirarte
July 1, 2002 – Sept 13, 2002	(Mexico) Sergio Bueno	Sept 14, 2002 – Dec 31, 2003	(Mexico) Luis Fernando Tena
Jan 1, 2004 – Oct 31, 2005	(Mexico) Eduardo de la Torre	Nov 3, 2005 – Dec 31, 2005	(Mexico) Jorge Vantolrá
Jan 1, 2006 – Feb 28, 2006	(Mexico) Benjamín Galindo	March 5, 2006 – Sept 1, 2006	(Uruguay) Wilson Graniolatti
Sept 12, 2006 – March 24, 2009	(Mexico) Daniel Guzmán	March 26, 2009 – Dec 31, 2009	(Mexico) Sergio Bueno
Jan 1, 2010 – Feb 20, 2011	(Argentina) Rubén Omar Romano	Feb 21, 2011 – Sept 3, 2011	(Argentina) Diego Cocca
Sept 3, 2011 – Sept 18, 2011	(Mexico) Eduardo Rergis (int.)	Sept 19, 2011 – Nov 17, 2012	(Mexico) Benjamín Galindo
Jan 1, 2013 – Aug 15, 2015	(Portugal) Pedro Caixinha	Aug 19, 2015– Nov 22, 2015	(Spain) Pako Ayestarán
Jan 1, 2016 – Aug 15, 2016	(Argentina) Luis Zubeldía	Aug 16, 2016 – Sep 18, 2017	(Mexico) José Manuel de la Torre
Sep 18, 2017 – Aug 8, 2018	(Uruguay) Robert Siboldi	Aug 8, 2018 – Apr 04, 2019	(Mexico) Salvador Reyes
Apr 16, 2019 – Nov 29, 2021	(Uruguay) Guillermo Almada	Dec 1, 2021 – Feb 24, 2022	(Portugal) Pedro Caixinha
Feb 24, 2022 – Apr 24, 2023	(Mexico) Eduardo Fentanes	Apr 27, 2023 – Feb 11, 2024	(Uruguay) Pablo Repetto
Feb 12, 2024 — Nov 12, 2024	(Mexico) Ignacio "Nacho" Ambríz	Nov 23, 2024 — May 5, 2025.	(Argentina) Fernando Ortiz
May 10, 2025 — Feb 17, 2026	(Spain) Francisco	Feb 17, 2026 — Present	(Mexico) Omar Tapia

== Players ==
=== First team ===
As of 13 November 2026

Note: Flags indicate national team as defined under FIFA eligibility rules; some limited exceptions apply. Players may hold more than one non-FIFA nationality.

No.	Pos.	Nation	Player
1	GK	MEX	Carlos Acevedo (captain)
3	DF	USA	Mauricio Cuevas
4	DF	MEX	José Abella
5	MF	MEX	Aldo López
6	MF	MEX	Javier Güémez
7	MF	PAR	Diego González
8	MF	MEX	Salvador Mariscal
9	FW	ARG	Lucas Di Yorio
10	MF	ARG	Ezequiel Bullaude
14	DF	MEX	Efraín Orona
15	MF	MEX	Joshua Mancha
17	DF	MEX	Emmanuel Echeverría
18	DF	ARG	Franco Pardo

No.	Pos.	Nation	Player
19	FW	MEX	Eduardo Aguirre
20	FW	MEX	Esteban Lozano (on loan from América)
21	MF	ESP	Fran Villalba
22	DF	MEX	Kevin Picón
23	MF	ARG	Facundo Cáseres
24	MF	MEX	Diego Medina
25	DF	ARG	Felipe Sánchez (on loan from Schalke 04)
26	MF	ARG	Ramiro Sordo
28	DF	MEX	Geovanni Pérez
29	FW	MEX	Tahiel Jiménez
33	GK	MEX	Héctor Holguín
77	MF	COL	Kevin Palacios

=== Youth squad ===
Note: Flags indicate national team as defined under FIFA eligibility rules; some limited exceptions apply. Players may hold more than one non-FIFA nationality.

No. / Pos. / Nation / Player; 188 / FW / NOR / Magnus Francisco López	No. / Pos. / Nation / Player; 193 / MF / MEX / Luis Gómez

=== Other players under contract ===
Note: Flags indicate national team as defined under FIFA eligibility rules; some limited exceptions apply. Players may hold more than one non-FIFA nationality.

No.	Pos.	Nation	Player
2	DF	ARG	Bruno Amione (injured)

=== Out on loan ===
Note: Flags indicate national team as defined under FIFA eligibility rules; some limited exceptions apply. Players may hold more than one non-FIFA nationality.

No.	Pos.	Nation	Player
—	GK	MEX	David Sánchez (at Piratas)
—	MF	COL	Kevin Balanta (at Independiente Santa Fe)
—	MF	URU	Franco Fagúndez (at Independiente Santa Fe)

No.	Pos.	Nation	Player
—	FW	MEX	Santiago Muñoz (at Atlético San Luis)
—	FW	MEX	Jesús Ocejo (at Jaiba Brava)
—	FW	MEX	Ronaldo Rubio (at Irapuato)

=== Retired numbers ===
- 58 – (Mexico) Jared Borgetti, Forward (1996 - 2006)

=== Player records ===
==== Top scorers ====
Primera División

- (Mexico) Gabriel Caballero (Verano 1997; 13)
- (Mexico) Jared Borgetti (Invierno 2000; 19)
- (Mexico) Jared Borgetti (Verano 2001; 22)
- (Mexico) Vicente Matías Vuoso (Clausura 2005; 16)
- (Mexico) Vicente Matías Vuoso (Apertura 2005; 11)
- (Ecuador) Christian Benítez (Apertura 2010; 14)
- (Cape Verde) Djaniny (Clausura 2018; 14)
- (Colombia) Harold Preciado (Apertura 2023; 16)

Copa Mexico

- (Chile) Richard Zambrano (1994–95 Copa Mexico; 3)
- (Colombia) Andrés Rentería (Apertura 2014 Copa MX; 6)

International

- (Mexico) Oribe Peralta (2011–12 CONCACAF Champions League; 7)
- (Colombia) Darwin Quintero (2012–13 CONCACAF Champions League; 6)

==== All-time records ====
- Updated March 6, 2019.

Most appearances
Rank	Player	Apps
1	(Mexico) Juan Pablo Rodríguez	343
2	(Mexico) Oswaldo Sánchez	340
3	(Chile) Rodrigo Ruiz	328
4	(Mexico) Jared Borgetti	319
5	(Mexico) Rafael Figueroa	288
6	(Mexico) Iván Estrada	284
7	(Colombia) Darwin Quintero	277
8	(Mexico) Carlos Cariño	273
9	(Mexico) Oribe Peralta	266
10	(Mexico) Héctor Altamirano	258

Top Scorers
Rank	Player	Goals
1	(Mexico) Jared Borgetti	205
2	(Mexico) Matías Vuoso	107
3	(Mexico) Oribe Peralta	97
4	(Colombia) Darwin Quintero	84
5	(Argentina) Daniel Ludueña	72
6	(Chile) Rodrigo Ruiz	65
7	(Ecuador) Christian Benítez	58
8	(Argentina) Julio Furch	54
9	(Cape Verde) Djaniny	53
10	(Honduras) Juan Flores	46

== Management ==
Name	From	To
(Mexico) Salvador Necochea Sagui	1984	1988
(Mexico) Francisco Dávila Rodríguez	1989	1990
(Mexico) Salvador Necochea Sagui	1991	1991
(Mexico) Francisco Dávila Rodríguez	1991	1992
(Mexico) Armando Navarro Gascón	1992	1992
(Mexico) Alberto Canedo Macouzet	1993	1994
(Mexico) Francisco Dávila Rodríguez	1994	1995
(Mexico) Martín Ibarreche	1995	1996
(Mexico) Francisco Dávila Rodríguez	1996	2000
(Mexico) Guillermo Cantú	2000	2003
(Mexico) Alberto Canedo Macouzet	2004	2006
(Mexico) Alejandro Irarragorri	2007	2019
(Mexico) Dante Elizalde	2019	2024
(Mexico) Aleco Irarragorri	2024	

== Reserves ==
=== Club Santos Laguna "A" ===
Founded in 2006, the team participated in the Primera División "A". It was dissolved in 2009, after the creation of the under-20 and under-17 tournaments.

=== Club Santos Casino/Club Santos Córdoba ===
Founded in 2008 as Club Santos Casino, after the Casino Español de Córdoba established an agreement with Grupo Modelo. The team was based in Córdoba, Veracruz, and participated in the Tercera División. The team changed its name to Club Santos Córdoba in 2013, after the collaboration agreement between Santos Laguna and the Casino Español was not renewed.

=== Club Santos Los Mochis ===
Founded in 2012, the team was based in Los Mochis, Sinaloa, and participated in the Segunda División. It was dissolved in 2014, due to legal issues.

=== Club Santos Laguna Premier ===
Founded in 2015, the team participated in the Liga Premier, after the creation of the Torneo de Filiales for the affiliate teams of Liga MX clubs.

== See also ==
- Santos Laguna (women)
- Santos Laguna Premier
