= Wilson Graniolatti =

Uruguayan footballer (born 1962)

Personal information
- Full name: Wilson Edelber Graniolatti Cha
- Date of birth: 13 July 1962 (age 64)
- Place of birth: Nueva Palmira, Uruguay
- Position: Defender

Senior career*
Years	Team	Apps	(Gls)
1984–1986	Nacional		
1986–1988	Toluca		
1988–1989	Santos Laguna		
1989–1990	Toluca		
1990–1991	Querétaro		
1991–1996	Atlante		
1997	Deportes Concepción	11	(0)

Managerial career
- 1997–2001: Atlas (assistant)
- 2001–2002: Toluca (assistant)
- 2002: Toluca
- 2003–2004: San Luis Potosí
- 2004–2005: Veracruz
- 2006: Santos Laguna
- 2008–2009: Tijuana
- 2011: Chiapas (assistant)
- 2012: Toluca
- 2013: Atlante
- * Club domestic league appearances and goals

Wilson Edelber Graniolatti Cha (born 13 July 1962), known as Wilson Graniolatti, is a Uruguayan football manager and former player A defender, he played for clubs of Uruguay, Chile and Mexico.

== Playing career ==
- Nacional 1985–1986
- Toluca 1986–1988
- Santos Laguna 1988–1989
- Toluca 1989–1990
- Queretaro 1990–1991
- Atlante 1991–1996
- Deportes Concepción 1997

== Managerial career ==
- Atlas (Assistant) 1997–2001
- Toluca (assistant) 2001–2002
- Toluca 2002
- Club San Luis 2003–2004
- Veracruz 2004–2005
- Santos Laguna 2006
- Tijuana 2008–2009
- Chiapas (assistant) 2011
- Toluca 2012
- Atlante 2013
