= Benjamín Galindo =

Mexican footballer (born 1960)

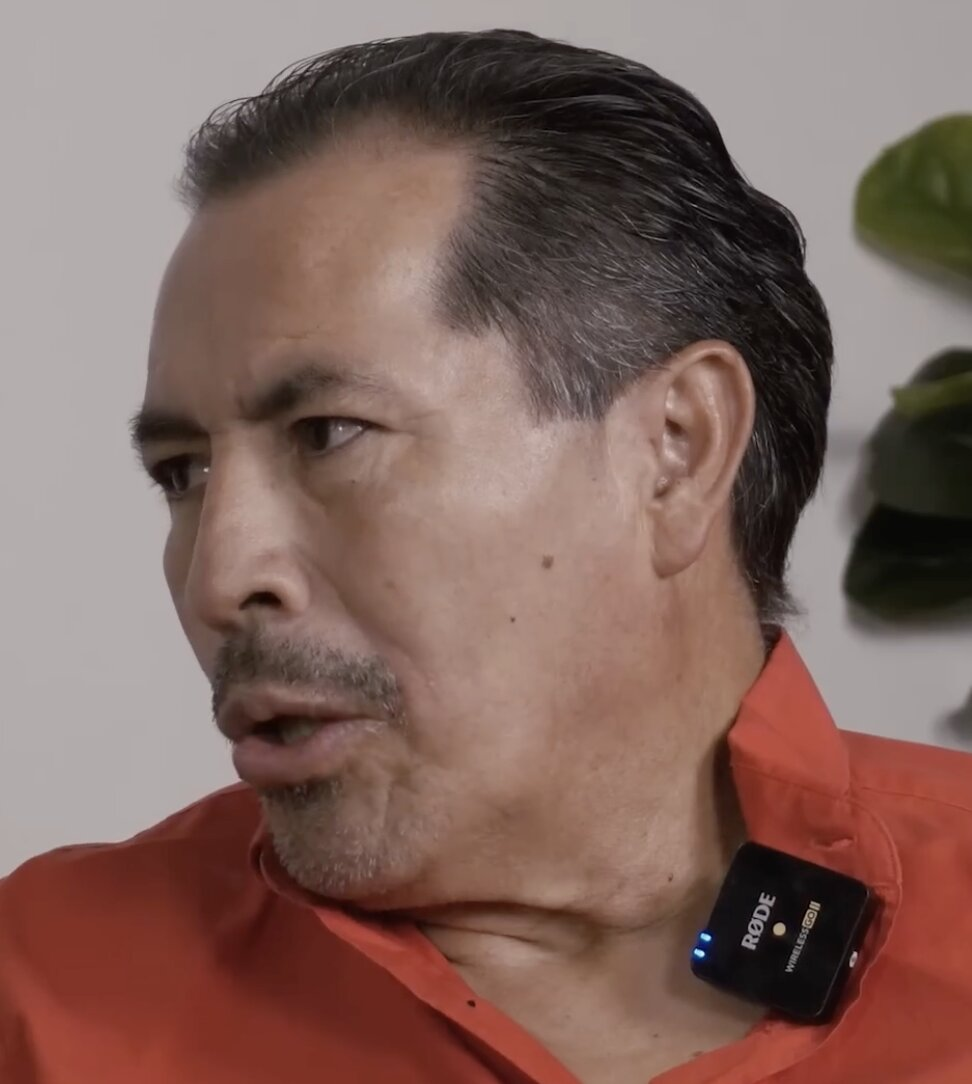
- Galindo in 2025

Personal information
- Full name: Benjamín Galindo Marentes
- Date of birth: 11 December 1960 (age 65)
- Place of birth: Tierra Blanca, Zacatecas, Mexico
- Height: 1.70 m (5 ft 7 in)
- Position: Midfielder

Senior career*
Years	Team	Apps	(Gls)
1979–1986	Tampico Madero	205	(26)
1986–1994	Guadalajara	271	(84)
1994–1997	Santos Laguna	101	(24)
1997–1999	Cruz Azul	72	(19)
1999	Pachuca	20	(3)
2000–2001	Guadalajara	34	(7)
Total		703	(163)

International career
1983–1997	Mexico	65	(28)

Managerial career
- 2004–2005: Guadalajara
- 2006: Santos Laguna
- 2007–2008: Cruz Azul (assistant)
- 2008–2009: Cruz Azul
- 2010–2011: Atlas
- 2011–2012: Santos Laguna
- 2013: Guadalajara
- 2016: Corinthians FC of San Antonio
- 2016–2017: Santos Laguna (assistant)
- 2018–2022: San Jose Earthquakes (assistant)
Medal record
Representing Mexico
Runner-up	Copa America	1993
Third place	CONCACAF Gold Cup	1991
- * Club domestic league appearances and goals

Benjamín Galindo Marentes (born 11 December 1960), nicknamed El Maestro (The Master), is a Mexican former professional footballer who played as a midfielder. He participated with the national team in the 1994 FIFA World Cup.

== Playing career ==
=== International ===
Galindo made 65 appearances and scored 28 goals for the Mexico national football team from 1983 to 1997.

== Coaching career ==
Galindo was the former coach (director tecnico) of the powerhouse Mexican association football club, CD Guadalajara, until he was replaced in the 2005 season. He was also the coach of Santos Laguna but was once again replaced due to poor results.

Galindo was the coach of Cruz Azul until he was replaced with Enrique Meza. He then moved to Club Atlas. Benjamin Galindo for the first time was champion as coach with Club Santos Laguna in the Clausura 2012.

On 18 August 2013, Galindo was sacked by CD Guadalajara.

In January 2016, Galindo was hired as the head coach for Corinthians FC of San Antonio

On November 13, 2018, Galindo was announced as the assistant manager under Matias Almeyda's staff at San Jose Earthquakes.

== Personal life ==
Galindo is the father of the Mexican defender the same name, Benjamín Galindo Jr.

== Career statistics ==
=== International goals ===
No.	Date	Venue	Opponent	Score	Result	Competition
1.	January 13, 1987	Los Angeles Memorial Coliseum, Los Angeles, United States	El Salvador	3–1	3–1	Friendly
2.	April 28, 1987	Estadio Nemesio Díez, Toluca, Mexico	Bahamas	2–0	13–0	Friendly
3.	April 28, 1987	Estadio Nemesio Díez, Toluca, Mexico	Bahamas	6–0	13–0	Friendly
4.	April 28, 1987	Estadio Nemesio Díez, Toluca, Mexico	Bahamas	13–0	13–0	Friendly
5.	March 17, 1987	Estadio León, Leon, Mexico	China	3–2	3–2	Friendly
6.	May 17, 1987	Estadio Nemesio Díez, Toluca, Mexico	Bermuda	3–0	6–0	Friendly
7.	May 17, 1987	Estadio Nemesio Díez, Toluca, Mexico	Bermuda	6–0	6–0	Friendly
8.	July 31, 1987	Los Angeles Memorial Coliseum, Los Angeles, United States	Argentina	1–0	1–1	Friendly
9.	December 2, 1987	Santa Ana Stadium, Santa Ana, United States	Guyana	4–0	9–0	Friendly
10.	December 2, 1987	Santa Ana Stadium, Santa Ana, United States	Guyana	6–0	9–0	Friendly
11.	June 28, 1991	Los Angeles Memorial Coliseum, Los Angeles, United States	Jamaica	1–0	4–1	1991 CONCACAF Gold Cup
12.	June 28, 1991	Los Angeles Memorial Coliseum, Los Angeles, United States	Jamaica	3–1	4–1	1991 CONCACAF Gold Cup
13.	June 30, 1991	Los Angeles Memorial Coliseum, Los Angeles, United States	Canada	3–1	3–1	1991 CONCACAF Gold Cup
14.	July 7, 1991	Los Angeles Memorial Coliseum, Los Angeles, United States	Costa Rica	2–0	2–0	1991 CONCACAF Gold Cup
15.	February 10, 1993	Estadio Universitario, San Nicolás de los Garza, Mexico	Romania	1–0	2–0	Friendly
16.	July 4, 1993	Estadio Monumental Isidro Romero Carbo, Guayaquil, Ecuador	Argentina	1–1	1–2	1993 Copa America Final
17.	October 6, 1993	Los Angeles Memorial Coliseum, Los Angeles, United States	South Africa	3–0	4–0	Friendly
18.	October 6, 1993	Los Angeles Memorial Coliseum, Los Angeles, United States	South Africa	4–0	4–0	Friendly
19.	October 20, 1993	Jack Murphy Stadium, San Diego, United States	Ukraine	2–1	2–1	Friendly
20.	December 14, 1994	Estadio Azteca, Mexico City, Mexico	Hungary	5–1	5–1	Friendly
21.	October 30, 1996	Estadio Azteca, Mexico City, Mexico	Saint Vincent and the Grenadines	1–0	5–1	1998 FIFA World Cup qualification
22.	October 30, 1996	Estadio Azteca, Mexico City, Mexico	Saint Vincent and the Grenadines	2–0	5–1	1998 FIFA World Cup qualification
23.	November 6, 1996	Estadio Azteca, Mexico City, Mexico	Honduras	1–0	3–1	1998 FIFA World Cup qualification
24.	March 2, 1997	Estadio Azteca, Mexico City, Mexico	Canada	2–0	4–0	1998 FIFA World Cup qualification
25.	April 13, 1997	Estadio Azteca, Mexico City, Mexico	Jamaica	1–0	6–0	1998 FIFA World Cup qualification
26.	October 5, 1997	Estadio Azteca, Mexico City, Mexico	El Salvador	1–0	5–0	1998 FIFA World Cup qualification
27.	October 5, 1997	Estadio Azteca, Mexico City, Mexico	El Salvador	3–0	5–0	1998 FIFA World Cup qualification
28.	November 9, 1997	Estadio Azteca, Mexico City, Mexico	Costa Rica	2–0	3–3	1998 FIFA World Cup qualification

== Honours ==
=== Player ===
Guadalajara

- Mexican Primera División: 1986–87

Santos Laguna

- Mexican Primera División: Invierno 1996

Cruz Azul

- Mexican Primera División: Invierno 1997
- CONCACAF Champions' Cup: 1997

Pachuca

- Mexican Primera División: Invierno 1999

Individual

- Mexican Primera División Golden Ball: 1986–87
- CONCACAF Gold Cup Golden Boot: 1991
- IFFHS Men's All Time Mexico Dream Team

=== Manager ===
Santos Laguna

- Mexican Primera División: Clausura 2012

Individual

- Mexican Primera División Best Manager: Clausura 2012
