= 1994–95 Club América season =

Club América
1994–95 season
- Owner: Televisa
- Chairman: Emilio Diez-Barroso
- Manager: Leo Beenhakker (until 7 April 1995); Mirko Jozic
- Stadium: Azteca
- Primera Division: 2nd Semifinals
- Copa México: Semifinals
- Top goalscorer: League: Biyik (33 goals); All: Biyik (36 goals)
Home colours	Away colours
- All statistics correct as of 2 August 2022.

The 1994–95 Club América season was the 53rd season competing in Primera Division.

== Summary ==
During the summer, Emilio Diez-Barroso, in his 15th season as club president and in his 5th year without a league title, reinforced the squad with several players such as: Forward Francois Omam Biyik, Right-back Defender Raul Gutierrez, midfielders Joaquin del Olmo and Kalusha Bwalya. Additionally, Dutch manager Leo Beenhakker arrived after coaching the squad of Saudi Arabia. The transfer, led by Forward Cuauhtemoc Blanco, improved the performance and helped them reach first position on table resulting in the highest number in attendances to Azteca stadium in years.

Meanwhile, the squad could maintain the good streak during the first month of the year, in spite of four club players: Zague, Luis Garcia, Raul Gutierrez and Joaquin del Olmo were playing the 1995 King Fahd Cup from 1 January to 6 January.

Owing to their participation in 1995 Pan American Games by young players Raul Lara, German Villa and Cuauhtemoc Blanco representing the national U-23 team, the offensive line was sinking from 10 March to 24 March, hence, the squad only clinched two draws against Toros Neza and archrivals CD Guadalajara despite being heavily favourites.

In spite of having the best season performance and attendances since the 80s manager Leo Beenhakker was under pressure since January by both club vice president Rubolotta and President Diez Barrosso to line up Forward Luis Garcia recently transferred in from Real Sociedad with an infamous 1 year tenure without scoring a single league goal (since 1 May 1994 with Atletico Madrid). Meanwhile, the club and talented midfielder Joaquin del Olmo had contract issues due to a renewal for the next seasons the conflict escalated upon reached manager Beenhakker asked by the president Barroso to not line up Del Olmo against Puebla FC on April 5. However, the Dutch coach lined-up Del Olmo and was sacked by vice president Rubolotta the next day by 0730 hs at his home in Cuernavaca according to Beenhakker. Finally, with Mirko Jozic as new manager the squad was eliminated in semifinals for the third consecutive year losing the series against Cruz Azul.

== Squad ==
Note: Flags indicate national team as defined under FIFA eligibility rules; some limited exceptions apply. Players may hold more than one non-FIFA nationality.

No.	Pos.	Nation	Player
1	GK	MEX	Adrian Chavez
2	DF	MEX	Juan Hernandez
3	DF	MEX	Jose Enrique Rodon
4	DF	MEX	Luis Felipe Peña
5	DF	MEX	Guillermo Naranjo
6	MF	MEX	Raul Rodrigo Lara
7	MF	ARG	Marcelo Barticciotto
8	MF	MEX	Joaquin del Olmo
9	FW	CMR	François Omam-Biyik
10	MF	ARG	German Martellotto
11	FW	MEX	Pedro Pineda
12	GK	MEX	Alejandro García
13	DF	BRA	Edu Manga
14	FW	MEX	Francisco Uribe
15	DF	MEX	Rafael Bautista

No.	Pos.	Nation	Player
16	MF	ZAM	Kalusha Bwalya
17	FW	MEX	Luís Roberto Alves
18	DF	CMR	Jean-Claude Pagal
19	FW	MEX	Ari Jair Fenoy
20	MF	MEX	Joaquín Hernández
21	DF	MEX	Raul Gutierrez
22	MF	MEX	German Villa
23	FW	MEX	Cuauhtemoc Blanco
24	GK	MEX	Ángel Maldonado
25	FW	MEX	Luis Garcia
26	MF	CHI	Oscar Eduardo Soto
27	DF	BRA	Branco
45	DF	MEX	Marco Capetillo
42	DF	MEX	Jorge Antonio Toledano
46	DF	MEX	Carlos Serafín Inda

=== Transfers ===
In
Pos.	Name	from	Type
FW	François Omam-Biyik	RC Lens	
MF	Kalusha Bwalya	PSV Eindhoven	
DF	Raul Gutierrez	Atlante F.C.	
MF	Joaquin del Olmo	Tiburones Rojos de Veracruz	
DF	Luis Felipe Peña	Leones Negros UdeG	

Out
Pos.	Name	To	Type
MF	Antonio Carlos Santos	Tigres UANL	-
MF	Cesilio de los Santos	Tigres UANL	-
FW	Gonzalo Farfan	Toros Neza	
DF	Guillermo Huerta	Atlético Morelia	
DF	Alejandro Dominguez	Tampico Madero	
MF	Gerardo Silva	Tampico Madero	
DF	Marco Sanchez Yacuta	Puebla FC	
DF	Jesus Eduardo Cordova	Puebla FC	

==== Winter ====
In
Pos.	Name	from	Type
FW	Luis Garcia	Real Sociedad	
DF	Branco	Manaus	
DF	Eduardo Soto		
DF	Jean-Claude Pagal	FC Martigues	

Out
Pos.	Name	To	Type
MF	German Martellotto	CF Pachuca	
MF	Marcelo Barticciotto	Universidad Católica	
GK	Alejandro García	CD Irapuato	

== Competitions ==
=== La Liga ===
==== League table ====
===== Group 1 =====
Pos	Team	Pld	W	D	L	GF	GA	GD	Pts	Qualification
1	América	36	19	13	4	88	46	+42	51	Playoff
2	Necaxa	36	16	14	6	69	38	+31	46	Playoff
3	Tecos	36	14	14	8	50	47	+3	42	Playoff
4	Toros Neza	36	12	8	16	55	62	−7	32	
5	UANL	36	7	10	19	34	50	−16	24	

===== General table =====
Pos	Team	Pld	W	D	L	GF	GA	GD	Pts	Qualification
1	Guadalajara	36	22	8	6	70	35	+35	52	Qualification for the quarter-finals (Note: The first four places in the table and teams ranked 6th and 8th qualified for the Liguilla quarter-finals.)
2	America	36	19	13	4	88	46	+42	51	Qualification for the quarter-finals
3	Cruz Azul	36	20	8	8	91	45	+46	48	Qualification for the quarter-finals
4	Necaxa	36	16	14	6	69	38	+31	46	Qualification for the quarter-finals
5	UAG (C)	36	14	14	8	50	47	+3	42	Qualification for the Repechaje (Note: Teams ranked 5th, 7th, 9th and 11th in the table qualified for Repechaje)

Source: Liga MX
Rules for classification: 1) Points; 2) Goal difference; 3) Number of goals scored; 4) Head-to-head results between tied teams; 5) Number of goals scored away; 6) Highest relegation coefficient; 7) Fair Play points
(C) Champions

===== Results by round =====
Round	1	2	3	4	5	6	7	8	9	10	11	12	13	14	15	16	17	18	19	20	21	22	23	24	25	26	27	28	29	30	31	32	33	34	35	36	37	38
Ground	A	H	A	H	A	H	A	H	A	H	A	H	A	H	H	A	H	A	H	H	A	H	A	H	A	H	A	H	A	H	A	H	A	A	H	A	H	A
Result	W	L	W	W	D	W	D	W	D	W	W	-	D	D	W	W	L	W	W	W	W	W	L	W	W	L	W	W	D	D	-	D	D	D	W	D	D	D
Position	4	5	2	2	2	2	2	2	2	2	1	2	2	2	1	1	1	2	2	1	1	1	2	1	1	1	1	1	1	2	2	1	1	1	1	2	2	2

Source: https://www.rsssf.org/tablesm/mex95.html
A = Away; H = Home; W = Win; D = Draw; L = Loss; P = Postponed; = Leader, Qualification for the quarter-finals; C = Qualification for the quarter-finals as group leader.; E = Qualification for the quarter-finals as group runner-up.; R = Qualification for the Repechaje.

==== Matches ====
4 September 1994 1	Club Leon	0-2	América	Irapuato
12:00 CT			26' Zague; 73'Zague	Stadium: Estadio Sergio León Chávez
Note: Match not played in Leon de los Aldama due to a ban on Nou Camp

11 September 1994 2	América	0-1	Atlas FC	Tlalpan
12:00 CT			61' Cristian Domizzi	Stadium: Azteca

16 September 1994 3	Tecos UAG	1-3	América	Zapopan
20:45 CT	Eustacio Rizo 67'		11' Kalusha; 59' Biyik; 83' Blanco	Stadium: 3 de Marzo

23 September 1994 4	América	2-1	Santos Laguna	Tlalpan
20:45 CT	Luis Felipe Peña 11' del Olmo 78'		86' Adomaitis	Stadium: Azteca

1 October 1994 5	Cruz Azul	1-1	América	Tlalpan
17:00 CT	Pedro Duana 57'		61' Biyik	Stadium: Azteca

7 October 1994 6	América	7-3	Atlético Morelia	Tlalpan
20:45 CT	Kalusha 10'; Biyik 21', 24'; Zague 42'; Biyik 58' del Olmo 70'; Biyik 75'		1' (pen.) Marco Antonio Figueroa; 3' Juan Morales; 63' Roberto Hernández	Stadium: Azteca

16 October 1994 7	Atlante F.C.	2-2	América	Benito Juarez
12:00 CT	Romano 35'; García 42'		52' Zague; 77' Biyik	Stadium: Azulgrana

21 October 1994 8	América	8-1	Correcaminos UAT	Tlalpan
20:45 CT	Kalusha 17'; Biyik 25', 47'; Zague 65', 79'; Blanco 71', 85'; Uribe 89'		49' Nildeson Silva	Stadium: Azteca

29 October 1994 9	Tigres UANL	1-1	América	San Nicolas de los Garza
17:00 CT	Ruiz Esparza 60'		57' Biyik	Stadium: Universitario

4 November 1994 10	América	4-1	Toros Neza	Tlalpan
20:45 CT	Biyik 24'; Kalusha 42'; Zague 63'; Blanco 72'		88' Luis Carlos Perea	Stadium: Azteca

13 November 1994 11	CD Guadalajara	3-4	América	Guadalajara
12:00 CT	Ramón Ramírez 36', 41'; Daniel Guzmán 46' (pen.)		16' Kalusha; 42' Biyik; 55' Zague; 66' Blanco	Stadium: Jalisco

19 November 1994 12	America	bye	Leones Negros UdeG	Tlalpan
12:00 CT				Stadium: Azteca

26 November 1994 13	Tiburones Rojos de Veracruz	3-3	América	Veracruz
16:00 CT	José Luis González China 35' (pen.); Pedro Pablo Osorio 72'; Elías Ledesma 78'		41' Bwalya; 59' Biyik; 66' Zague	Stadium: Pirata Fuente

30 November 1994 14	América	2-2	Puebla FC	Tlalpan
20:45 CT	Biyik 43', 54'		40' Alexandre Pimentel; 47' Sergio Lira	Stadium: Azteca

4 December 1994 15	América	3-1	Pumas UNAM	Tlalpan
12:00 CT	Zague 30'; Biyik 62'; Kalusha 70'		11' Massacessi	Stadium: Azteca

11 December 1994 16	TM Gallos Blancos	2-8	América	Queretaro
12:00 CT	Héctor del Ángel 4'; Carlos Hernández 16'		27', 36', 59', 87' Zague; 40' (o.g.)Héctor Quintero; 67', 69' Biyik; 85' Kalusha	Stadium: Corregidora
Note: On December 7, due to problems between the club and Municipal government regards the leasing of Estadio Tamaulipas, Tampico Madero was relocated in Querétaro and renamed as TM Gallos Blancos.

18 December 1994 17	América	1-2	Necaxa	Tlalpan
12:00 CT	Zague 30'		8', 19' Basay	Stadium: Azteca

23 December 1994 18	CD Toluca	0-3	América	Toluca
15:00 CT			29', 83' Biyik; 63' Zague	Stadium: La Bombonera

30 December 1994 19	América	2-1	CF Monterrey	Tlalpan
20:45 CT	Biyik 72'; Zague 77'		10' Careca	Stadium: Azteca

8 January 1995 20	América	1-0	Club León	Tlalpan
17:00 CT	Pedro Pineda 15'			Stadium: Azteca

18 January 1995 21	Atlas FC	1-2	América	Guadalajara
20:45 CT	Sergio Pacheco 5'		53' Kalusha Bwalya; 70' Zague	Stadium: Jalisco

22 January 1995 22	América	2-1	Tecos UAG	Tlalpan
12:00 CT	Kalusha Bwalya 3'; Biyik 61'		45' Eustacio Rizo	Stadium: Azteca

29 January 1995 23	Santos Laguna	2-0	América	Torreon
16:00 CT	Miguel Asprilla 76', 82'			Stadium: Corona

5 February 1995 24	América	3-1	Cruz Azul	Tlalpan
12:00 CT	Biyik 30', 34', 60'		64' Hermosillo	Stadium: Azteca

12 February 1995 25	Atlético Morelia	1-6	América	Morelia
12:00 CT	Hugo Santana 59'		26', 27' Kalusha Bwalya; 72' Juan Hernández; 85' Biyik; 87', 89' Zague	Stadium: Morelos

19 February 1995 26	América	1-4	Atlante F.C.	Tlalpan
12:00 CT	Zague 69'		1', 32' Hugo Sánchez; 20' José Enrique García; 85' Salvador	Stadium: Azteca

26 February 1995 27	Correcaminos UAT	0-2	América	Ciudad Victoria
12:00 CT			39' Zague; 76' Biyik	Stadium: Marte R. Gomez

5 March 1995 28	América	2-1	Tigres UANL	Tlalpan
12:00 CT	Zague 40'; Francisco Uribe 76'		70' Francisco Javier Cruz	Stadium: Azteca

12 March 1995 29	Toros Neza	1-1	América	Ciudad Nezahualcoyotl
15:00 CT	Martín Vilallonga 16'		73' Biyik	Stadium: Neza 86

19 March 1995 30	América	0-0	CD Guadalajara	Tlalpan
12:00 CT				Stadium: Azteca

26 March 1995 31	Leones Negros UdeG	bye	America	Guadalajara
12:00 CT				Stadium: Jalisco

2 April 1995 32	América	1-1	Tiburones Rojos de Veracruz	Tlalpan
12:00 CT	Biyik 16'		18' Leonel Bolsonello	Stadium: Azteca

5 April 1995 33	Puebla FC	1-1	América	Puebla
20:30 CT	Salvador Reyes 39'		89' Biyik	Stadium: Cuauhtemoc

9 April 1995 34	Pumas UNAM	0-0	América	Coyoacan
12:00 CT				Stadium: Olimpico Universitario

16 April 1995 35	América	4-0	TM Gallos Blancos	Tlalpan
12:00 CT	Kalusha Bwalya 16'; Luis García 37' del Olmo 39'; Biyik 66'			Stadium: Azteca

23 April 1995 36	Necaxa	4-4	América	Tlalpan
12:00 CT	Ivo Basay 11'; Ricardo Peláez 50', 56'; Aspe 78' (pen.)		27' (pen.), 68' Biyik; 44', 72' Luis García	Stadium: Azteca

29 April 1995 37	América	1-1	CD Toluca	Tlalpan
20:45 CT	Cuauhtémoc Blanco 19'		59' José Manuel Abundis	Stadium: Azteca

6 May 1995 38	CF Monterrey	1-1	América	Monterrey
20:45 CT	Mario Jáuregui 30'		57' Luis García	Stadium: Tecnologico

==== Quarterfinals ====
16 May 1995	Puebla FC	0-0	America	Puebla de los Angeles
20:30 CT				Stadium: Cuauhtemoc

19 May 1995	America	4-2	Puebla FC	Tlalpan
12:00 CT	Luis García 35', 70'; Francois-Omam Biyik 76' (pen.); Luis Roberto Alves "Zague" 88'		14' Alí Fernández; 58' Narciso Cuevas	Stadium: Azteca

==== Semifinals ====
24 May 1995	Cruz Azul	1-1	America	Tlalpan
17:00 CT	Pintado 9'	Report	1' del Olmo; (yellow card) 76' (yellow-red card) Raul Gutierrez	Stadium: Azteca; Attendance: 115,000; Referee: Antonio Marrufo Mendoza

27 May 1995	America	1-2	Cruz Azul	Tlalpan
12:00 CT	Zague 76'		25' Hermosillo; 30' Mora	Stadium: Azteca

=== Copa Mexico ===
==== First round ====
25 January 1995	San Luis FC	2-3	America	San Luis Potosí
14:45 CEST	Martín Rodiney 29'; Pavon 63'	Report	23' Biyik; 40', 51' Zague	Stadium: Olimpico

==== Second round ====
8 February 1995	Atletico San Francisco	0-1	America	San Francisco del Rincón
14:45 CEST			67' Francois-Omam Biyik	Stadium: Olimpico

==== Semifinals ====
15 February 1995	Necaxa	2-2 (4-3 p)	America	Tlalpan
20:45 CEST	Ambriz 5'; Basay 46'		2' Francois-Omam Biyik; 89' Kalusha	Stadium: Azteca

== Statistics ==
=== Players statistics ===
No.	Pos	Nat	Player	Total		Primera Division		1994-95 Copa Mexico	
No.	Pos	Nat	Player	Apps	Goals	Apps	Goals	Apps	Goals
1	GK	(Mexico) MEX	Adrian Chavez	35	-46	35	-46		
2	DF	(Mexico) MEX	Juan Hernandez	36	1	35+1	1		
5	DF	(Mexico) MEX	Guillermo Naranjo	22	0	17+5	0		
3	DF	(Mexico) MEX	Jose Enrique Rodon	24	1	17+7	1		
21	DF	(Mexico) MEX	Raul Gutierrez	30	0	29+1	0		
6	MF	(Mexico) MEX	Raul Rodrigo Lara	32	0	32	0		
16	MF	(Zambia) ZAM	Kalusha Bwalya	33	13	33	13		
8	MF	(Mexico) MEX	Joaquin del Olmo	31	3	31	3		
23	FW	(Mexico) MEX	Cuauhtemoc Blanco	28	6	26+2	6		
9	FW	(Cameroon) CMR	François Omam-Biyik	35	33	35	33		
17	FW	(Mexico) MEX	Luís Roberto Alves	30	23	30	23		
24	GK	(Mexico) MEX	Ángel Maldonado	1	0	1	0		
4	DF	(Mexico) MEX	Luis Felipe Peña	19	1	16+3	1		
15	DF	(Mexico) MEX	Rafael Bautista	14	0	12+2	0		
25	FW	(Mexico) MEX	Luis Garcia	12	4	10+2	4		
26	MF	(Chile) CHI	Oscar Eduardo Soto	11	0	9+2	0		
18	DF	(Cameroon) CMR	Jean-Claude Pagal	11	0	5+6	0		
14	FW	(Mexico) MEX	Francisco Uribe	15	2	4+11	2		
22	MF	(Mexico) MEX	German Villa	8	0	3+5	0		
20	MF	(Mexico) MEX	Joaquín Hernández	4	0	3+1	0		
27	DF	(Brazil) BRA	Branco	4	0	3+1	0		
7	MF	(Argentina) ARG	Marcelo Barticciotto	5	0	3+2	0		
13	DF	(Brazil) BRA	Edu Manga	6	0	2+4	0		
11	FW	(Mexico) MEX	Pedro Pineda	5	1	1+4	1		
45	DF	(Mexico) MEX	Marco Capetillo	2	0	1+1	0		
19	FW	(Mexico) MEX	Ari Jair Fenoy	1	0	1	0		
10	MF	(Argentina) ARG	German Martellotto	2	0	0+2	0		
42	DF	(Mexico) MEX	Jorge Antonio Toledano	1	0	0+1	0		
46	DF	(Mexico) MEX	Carlos Serafín Inda	1	0	0+1	0		
12	GK	(Mexico) MEX	Alejandro Garcia						

- Source: http://yalma.fime.uanl.mx/~futmx/MFL/Mex95/News/norte29my95b.html
