= 1994–95 Cruz Azul season =

Cruz Azul
1994–95 season
- Owner: Cooperativa La Cruz Azul, S.C.L.
- Chairman: Guillermo Alvarez Cuevas
- Manager: Enrique Meza (until 31 January 1995); Luis Fernando Tena
- Stadium: Estadio Azteca
- Primera Division: 3rd (Runners-up)
- Copa México: First round
- Top goalscorer: Carlos Hermosillo (35 goals)
Home colours	Away colours

The 1994–95 Deportivo Cruz Azul season was the club's 68th season in existence and the 30th consecutive season in the top flight of Mexican football. The club also competed in Copa México.

== Summary ==
In summertime, President Billy Alvarez reinforced the squad with Peruvian Defender Juan Reynoso, Forward Marcelo Delgado and midfielder Marco Garces. The squad performance during the first half of the season was irregular due to an unbalanced performance: a superb offensive line but a weak defensive guard. During the mid season the club replaced young Goalkeeper Oscar Perez with Argentine Norberto Scoponi also manager Enrique Meza was sacked and Luis Fernando Tena was appointed for the second half of the season. The season is best remembered by the 91 goals registered by a powerful offensive line aimed by Julio Zamora assists and Hermosillo clinching another league topscorer title. In league the team finished 3rd in the league's overall table, defeating Pumas UNAM in quarterfinals with a late goal scored by Right back Defender Guadalupe Castañeda.

Cruz Azul appeared in the playoffs. In the semi-finals they beat Club América (with whom they share Estadio Azteca) in the semi-finals. Reaching the final for the first time since 1989 they drew Necaxa 1–1 in the first leg, but lost the second leg 0–2 for a 3–1 aggregate.

In the 1994–95 Copa México they were eliminated in the first round by second tier side Irapuato.

== Squad ==
Note: Flags indicate national team as defined under FIFA eligibility rules; some limited exceptions apply. Players may hold more than one non-FIFA nationality.

No.	Pos.	Nation	Player
2	DF	MEX	Guadalupe Castañeda
3	DF	MEX	José Luis Sixtos
4	DF	PER	Juan Reynoso
5	DF	MEX	Héctor Esparza
6	MF	MEX	Héctor Islas
7	MF	BRA	Pintado
8	MF	MEX	Victor Ruiz
9	FW	ARG	Julio Zamora
10	MF	MEX	Pedro Duana
11	MF	MEX	Octavio Mora
12	GK	MEX	Oscar Pérez

No.	Pos.	Nation	Player
13	DF	MEX	Ricardo Carbajal
14	FW	ARG	Marcelo Delgado
15	FW	MEX	Francisco Palencia
16	DF	MEX	Marco Garcés
17	DF	MEX	Humberto Valdez
18	MF	MEX	David Rangel
20	GK	MEX	José Alberto Guadarrama
21	GK	ARG	Norberto Scoponi
22	MF	MEX	José Agustín Morales
26	DF	MEX	Antonio Taboada
27	FW	MEX	Carlos Hermosillo

=== Transfers ===
In
Pos.	Name	from	Type
DF	Juan Reynoso	Universitario de Deportes	
FW	Marcelo Delgado	Rosario Central	

Out
Pos.	Name	To	Type
GK	Robert Siboldi	Puebla FC	-
DF	Cle Kooiman	Atlético Morelia	-
MF	Luis Monzón	Olimpia Asunción	

==== Winter ====
In
Pos.	Name	from	Type
GK	Norberto Scoponi	Newell's Old Boys	

Out
Pos.	Name	To	Type

== Competitions ==
=== La Liga ===
==== League table ====
===== Group 1 =====
Pos	Team	Pld	W	D	L	GF	GA	GD	Pts	Qualification or relegation
1	Cruz Azul	36	20	8	8	91	45	+46	48	Playoff
2	Veracruz	36	12	11	13	43	51	−8	35	Playoff
3	Atlante	36	11	11	14	57	69	−12	33	
4	Morelia	36	9	12	15	54	75	−21	30	
5	Correcaminos	36	9	10	17	42	65	−23	28	Relegated

===== Overall Table =====
Pos	Team	Pld	W	D	L	GF	GA	GD	Pts	Qualification
1	Guadalajara	36	22	8	6	70	35	+35	52	Qualification for the quarter-finals (Note: The first four places in the table and teams ranked 6th and 8th qualified for the Liguilla quarter-finals.)
2	America	36	19	13	4	88	46	+42	51	Qualification for the quarter-finals
3	Cruz Azul	36	20	8	8	91	45	+46	48	Qualification for the quarter-finals
4	Necaxa	36	16	14	6	69	38	+31	46	Qualification for the quarter-finals
5	UAG (C)	36	14	14	8	50	47	+3	42	Qualification for the Repechaje (Note: Teams ranked 5th, 7th, 9th and 11th in the table qualified for Repechaje)

Source: Liga MX
Rules for classification: 1) Points; 2) Goal difference; 3) Number of goals scored; 4) Head-to-head results between tied teams; 5) Number of goals scored away; 6) Highest relegation coefficient; 7) Fair Play points
(C) Champions

===== Results by round =====
Round	1	2	3	4	5	6	7	8	9	10	11	12	13	14	15	16	17	18	19	20	21	22	23	24	25	26	27	28	29	30	31	32	33	34	35	36	37	38
Ground	H	A	H	A	H	A	H	A	H	A	H	A	H	A	A	H	A	H	A	A	H	A	H	A	H	A	H	A	H	A	H	A	H	H	A	H	A	H
Result	W	L	-	W	D	L	W	D	W	D	W	L	D	W	D	L	L	W	W	D	L	-	W	L	L	W	D	W	W	D	W	W	W	W	W	W	W	W
Position	2	7	14	6	4	9	6	8	5	4	3	4	5	4	5	5	7	6	4	5	5	6	5	5	8	7	8	7	7	6	5	4	4	4	4	4	3	3

A = Away; H = Home; W = Win; D = Draw; L = Loss; P = Postponed; = Leader, Qualification for the quarter-finals; C = Qualification for the quarter-finals as group leader.; E = Qualification for the quarter-finals as group runner-up.; R = Qualification for the Repechaje.

==== Matches ====
4 September 1994 1	Cruz Azul	5-2	Toros Neza	Ciudad Cooperativa
	Hermosillo 9', 21', 65'; Zamora 45', 52'		41' (pen.) Vazquez; 71' Mohamed	Stadium: 10 de Diciembre

11 September 1994 2	CD Guadalajara	3-1	Cruz Azul	Guadalajara
	Espinosa 40' de la Torre 59'; Zarate 89'		27' Islas	Stadium: Jalisco

17 September 1994 3	Cruz Azul	bye	Leones Negros UdeG	Tlalpan
				Stadium: Azteca

24 September 1994 4	Tiburones Rojos de Veracruz	0-4	Cruz Azul	Veracruz
			47', 65', 66', 68'Hermosillo	Stadium: Pirata Fuente

1 October 1994 5	Cruz Azul	1-1	América	Tlalpan
	Pedro Duana 57'		61' Biyik	Stadium: Azteca

9 October 1994 6	Pumas UNAM	2-1	Cruz Azul	Tlalpan
	Rafael García 10'; Jorge Campos 79' (pen.)		45' Octavio Mora	Stadium: Olimpico Universitario

15 October 1994 7	Cruz Azul	4-1	Tampico Madero	Tlalpan
	Hermosillo 9', 42'; Mora 50'; Pedro Duana 60'		65' René Mendieta	Stadium: Azteca

23 October 1994 8	Necaxa	0-0	Cruz Azul	Tlalpan
				Stadium: Azteca

29 October 1994 9	Cruz Azul	2-0	CD Toluca	Tlalpan
	Marcelo Delgado 13'; Juan Reynoso 60'			Stadium: Azteca

5 November 1994 10	CF Monterrey	2-2	Cruz Azul	Monterrey
	Héctor Nicanor 14', Rafael Gutiérrez Aldaco 60'		5' Octavio Mora; 33' Carlos Hermosillo	Stadium: Tecnológico

12 November 1994 11	Cruz Azul	6-0	Leon	Tlalpan
	Octavio Mora 29'; Carlos Hermosillo 32', 64', 69'; Pedro Duana 46', Víctor Ruiz 75'			Stadium: Azteca

19 November 1994 12	Atlas FC	2-1	Cruz Azul	Guadalajara
	Eduardo Berizzo 39', Jared Borguetti 44'		48' Luis Carlos de Oliveira	Stadium: Jalisco

26 November 1994 13	Cruz Azul	3-3	Tecos UAG	Tlalpan
	Carlos Hermosillo 30'; Pedro Duana 46', 51'		18', 39', Eustacio Rizo; 35' Porfirio Jiménez	Stadium: Azteca

30 November 1994 14	Santos Laguna	2-5	Cruz Azul	Torreon
	Everaldo Bejines 43'; Héctor Adomaitis 78' (pen.)		34', 51', Julio Zamora; 62', 89', Carlos Hermosillo; 75' Pedro Duana	Stadium: Corona

4 December 1994 15	Puebla FC	1-1	Cruz Azul	Puebla de los Angeles
	Narciso Cuevas 25'		80' Octavio Mora	Stadium: Cuauhtemoc
Note: On Dec. 7, due to problems with the leasing of Tamaulipas stadium, Tampico Madero was relocated in Querétaro and renamed as TM Gallos Blancos.

10 December 1994 16	Cruz Azul	1-3	Atlético Morelia	Tlalpan
	Carlos Hermosillo 19'		25' Marco Antonio Figueroa; 33' Guillermo Huerta; 60' Juan Antonio Flores Barrera	Stadium: Azteca

17 December 1994 17	Atlante FC	3-1	Cruz Azul	Benito Juarez
	Sanchez 31', 87'; Salvador 61'		41' Hermosillo	Stadium: Azulgrana

23 December 1994 18	Cruz Azul	3-2	Correcaminos UAT	Tlalpan
	Octavio Mora 39'; Julio Zamora 59', 77'		29' Carlos Orozco; 62' Ramiro Romero	Stadium: Azteca

29 December 1994 19	Tigres UANL	0-1	Cruz Azul	San Nicolas de los Garza
			28' Hermosillo	Stadium: Universitario

20	Toros Neza	3-3	Cruz Azul	Ciudad Nezahualcoyotl
	Jaime Ramírez 18'; Gonzalo Farfán 31'; Antonio Mohamed 36'		14' Octavio Mora; 60' (pen.) Julio Zamora; 74' Héctor Islas	Stadium: Estadio Neza 86

21	Cruz Azul	0-1	CD Guadalajara	Tlalpan
			28'José Manuel de la Torre	Stadium: Azteca

22	Leones Negros UdeG	bye	Cruz Azul	Guadalajara
				Stadium: Jalisco

23	Cruz Azul	3-1	Veracruz	Tlalpan
	Luis Carlos de Oliveira "Pintado" 5'; Carlos Hermosillo 77'; Octavio Mora 81'		21' José Luis Malibrán	Stadium: Azteca

5 February 1995 24	America	3-1	Cruz Azul	Coyoacan
	Biyik 30', 34', 60'		64' Hermosillo	Stadium: Azteca

25	Cruz Azul	0-1	U.N.A.M.	Tlalpan
			49'Rafael García	Stadium: Azteca

26	TM Gallos Blancos	0-2	Cruz Azul	Queretaro
			Luis Carlos de Oliveira "Pintado" 11'; Carlos Hermosillo 42'	Stadium: Corregidora

25 February 1995 27	Cruz Azul	1-1	Necaxa	Tlalpan
	Octavio Mora 89'		65' Alberto García Aspe	Stadium: Azteca

5 March 1995 28	CD Toluca	0-4	Cruz Azul	Toluca
			32' Carlos Hermosillo; 41' Julio Zamora; 57' José Luis Sixtos; 77' Pedro Duana	Stadium: La Bombonera

11 March 1995 29	Cruz Azul	6-0	CF Monterrey	Tlalpan
	Carlos Hermosillo 20', 64' (pen.), 75', 87'; Julio Zamora 27' (pen.), 62'			Stadium: Azteca

17 March 1995 30	Leon	1-1	Cruz Azul	Leon de los Aldama
	Gerardo Reynoso 41'		50' Víctor Ruiz	Stadium: Camp Nou

25 March 1995 31	Cruz Azul	4-0	Atlas FC	Tlalpan
	Julio Zamora 27'; Agustín Morales 37'; Carlos Hermosillo 71', 89' (pen.)			Stadium: Azteca

31 March 1995 32	Tecos UAG	0-2	Cruz Azul	Zapopan
			85' Marcelo Delgado; 88' Julio Zamora	Stadium: 3 de Marzo

6 April 1995 33	Cruz Azul	5-2	Santos Laguna	Tlalpan
	Julio Zamora 8' (pen.), 55'; Marcelo Delgado 9'; Pintado 76'; Octavio Mora 88' (pen.)		37', 79' Miguel Asprilla	Stadium: Azteca

11 April 1995 34	Cruz Azul	2-1	Puebla FC	Tlalpan
	Octavio Mora 77'; Carlos Hermosillo 89' (pen.)		87' (pen.) Antonio Teodoro Dos Santos "Toninho"	Stadium: Azteca

15 April 1995 35	Atlético Morelia	2-3	Cruz Azul	Morelia
	Marco Antonio Figueroa 83' (pen.); Pedro Jaque 88'		3' Julio Zamora; 54', 56' Hermosillo	Stadium: Morelos

22 April 1995 36	Cruz Azul	4-1	Atlante FC
	Carlos Hermosillo 15, Marcelo Delgado 55, Julio Zamora 57, Octavio Mora 89		Carlos Alberto Elizalde 79

30 April 1995 37	Correcaminos UAT	0-3	Cruz Azul	Ciudad Victoria
			65' Pintado; 84' Octavio Mora; 89' Marcelo Delgado	Stadium: Marte R. Gomez

6 May 1995 38	Cruz Azul	5-1	Tigres UANL	Tlalpan
	Carlos Hermosillo 19', 85'; Julio Zamora 25'; Marcelo Delgado 29'; Octavio Mora 63'		3' David Oliva	Stadium: Azteca

==== Quarter-finals ====
17 May 1995	UNAM	1-0	Cruz Azul	Mexico City
20:30	García 53'			Stadium: Estadio Olímpico Universitario

20 May 1995	Cruz Azul	1-0	UNAM	Mexico City
17:00	Castañeda 90+2'			Stadium: Estadio Azteca

Aggregate tied 1-1. Cruz Azul advanced to semi-finals as best seeded team.

==== Semi-finals ====
May 25, 1995	Cruz Azul	1-1	América	Mexico City
17:00	Oliveira 9'		del Olmo 1'	Stadium: Estadio Azteca

May 29, 1995	América	1-2	Cruz Azul	Mexico City
12:00	Zague 76'		Hermosillo 25'; Mora 30'	Stadium: Estadio Azteca

Cruz Azul won 2–3 on aggregate.

==== Finals ====
June 1, 1995	Necaxa	1-1	Cruz Azul	Mexico City
20:45	Basay 21'		Hermosillo 44'	Stadium: Estadio Azteca; Referee: Armando Archundia

June 4, 1995	Cruz Azul	0-2	Necaxa	Mexico City
17:00			Aguinaga 29'; Basay 83'	Stadium: Estadio Azteca; Referee: Arturo Brizio

Necaxa won 3–1 on aggregate.

=== Copa Mexico ===
==== First round ====
24 January 1995	Irapuato	3-3 (5-3 p)	Cruz Azul	Irapuato
	José Juan Rivera 19'; José Luis Castro 55'; Richard Tavares 83'		Juan Manuel Rivera 59' (o.g.); Marcelo Delgado 73'	Stadium: Estadio Sergio León Chávez

Irapuato won 5–3 on penalties.

== Statistics ==
=== Players statistics ===
No.	Pos	Nat	Player	Total		Primera Division		1994-95 Copa Mexico	
No.	Pos	Nat	Player	Apps	Goals	Apps	Goals	Apps	Goals
21	GK	(Argentina) ARG	Norberto Scoponi	17	-12	17	-12		
2	DF	(Mexico) MEX	Guadalupe Castañeda	32	0	32	0		
3	DF	(Mexico) MEX	José Luis Sixtos	32	1	32	1		
4	DF	(Peru) PER	Juan Reynoso	29	1	29	1		
26	DF	(Mexico) MEX	Antonio Taboada	24	0	22+2	0		
6	MF	(Mexico) MEX	Héctor Islas	34	2	29+5	2		
7	MF	(Brazil) BRA	Pintado	29	6	24+5	6		
8	MF	(Mexico) MEX	Victor Ruiz	32	2	31+1	2		
10	MF	(Mexico) MEX	Pedro Duana	31	7	26+5	7		
9	FW	(Argentina) ARG	Julio Zamora	32	17	30+2	17		
27	FW	(Mexico) MEX	Carlos Hermosillo	33	35	33	35		
12	GK	(Mexico) MEX	Oscar Pérez	22	-28	17+5	-28		
22	MF	(Mexico) MEX	José Agustín Morales	19	1	19	1		
11	MF	(Mexico) MEX	Octavio Mora	33	14	17+16	14		
14	FW	(Argentina) ARG	Marcelo Delgado	31	5	17+14	5		
5	DF	(Mexico) MEX	Héctor Esparza	17	0	16+1	0		
18	MF	(Mexico) MEX	David Rangel	6	0	3+3	0		
20	GK	(Mexico) MEX	José Alberto Guadarrama	4	-5	2+2	-5		
13	DF	(Mexico) MEX	Ricardo Carbajal	6	0	1+5	0		
16	DF	(Mexico) MEX	Marco Garcés	5	0	0+5	0		
17	DF	(Mexico) MEX	Humberto Valdez	2	0	0+2	0		
15	FW	(Mexico) MEX	Francisco Palencia	1	0	0+1	0		

- Source: http://yalma.fime.uanl.mx/~futmx/MFL/Mex95/News/norte05jn95b.html
