= 1994–95 Atlante F.C. season =

Atlante
1994–95 season
- Chairman: José A. García
- Manager: Ricardo Lavolpe
- Stadium: Azulgrana
- Primera Division: 10th Group stage
- Copa México: First round
- Top goalscorer: League: Salvador (15 goals); All: Salvador (16 goals)
- Biggest win: Atlante 4–1 America (19 February 1995)
- Biggest defeat: Necaxa 7–0 Atlante (6 November 1994)
Home colours
- All statistics correct as of 2 August 2022.

The 1994–95 Atlante F.C. season was the 4th season since the team's last promotion to Primera División. Atlante competed in Primera División and Copa México

== Summary ==
In summertime, club president Jose A. Garcia reinforced the squad with several players, including the arrival of Forward Hugo Sanchez from Rayo Vallecano with a bigger salary than Real Madrid offered to him at his last contract (1991–92). In Copa Mexico the team was early eliminated on first round by Acapulco after a penalty series. In spite of a decent offensive line with Hugo Sanchez, Luis Miguel Salvador and playmaker Ruben Omar Romano (returned back to the club after playing in Veracruz one season), the defensive line was weak, shattering its options for a classification to the Playoffs finishing the campaign 2 points below Tiburones Rojos de Veracruz, which took the last available spot for the post-season.

According to Ricardo Lavolpe, during the season, forward Hugo Sanchez compared the club to Rayo Vallecano in front of several team mates, and the manager replied to him: "You were relegated to Segunda Division in 1994, We won the League"

== Squad ==
Note: Flags indicate national team as defined under FIFA eligibility rules; some limited exceptions apply. Players may hold more than one non-FIFA nationality.

No.	Pos.	Nation	Player
-	GK	MEX	Felix Fernandez
-	GK	MEX	Isaac Mizrahi
1	GK	MEX	Hugo Pineda
-	DF	MEX	Jorge Salas
-	DF	MEX	Miguel Herrera
-	DF	MEX	José Guadalupe Cruz
-	DF	MEX	José Navarrete
-	DF	MEX	Roberto Andrade
-	DF	MEX	Gastón Obledo
-	MF	URU	José Enrique García
-	MF	MEX	Mario García

No.	Pos.	Nation	Player
-	MF	ARG	Ruben Omar Romano
-	MF	MEX	Guillermo Cantú
-	MF	URU	Wilson Graniolatti
-	MF	MEX	Edgar García de Dios
68	FW	MEX	Luis Miguel Salvador
9	FW	MEX	Hugo Sanchez
-	FW	USA	Gerardo Mascareño
-	MF	ARG	Jose A. Forte
-	FW	ARG	Maxi Roditis

=== Transfers ===
In
Pos.	Name	from	Type
FW	Hugo Sanchez	Rayo Vallecano	
FW	Gerardo Mascareño	Puebla FC	
GK	Hugo Pineda	Leones Negros UdeG	
MF	Ruben Omar Romano	Veracruz	
MF	José Enrique García	Deportivo Mandiyú	
MF	Maxi Roditis		
DF	Marco Diaz Avalos	Veracruz	

Out
Pos.	Name	To	Type
DF	Raul Gutierrez	Club America	-
FW	Pedro Massacessi	Pumas UNAM	-
MF	Christian Trapasso	CF Pachuca	-
MF	Rene Isidoro Garcia	Tampico Madero	-
MF	Victor Medina	Veracruz	
DF	Cesar Suarez	CD Toluca	-
FW	Alejandro Herrera	Correcaminos UAT	-

==== Winter ====
In
Pos.	Name	from	Type
MF	Jose Alfredo Forte	Ferrocarril Oeste	

Out
Pos.	Name	To	Type
MF	Maxi Roditis		

== Competitions ==
=== La Liga ===
==== League table ====
Pos	Team	Pld	W	D	L	GF	GA	GD	Pts	Qualification or relegation
1	Cruz Azul	36	20	8	8	91	45	+46	48	Playoff
2	Veracruz	36	12	11	13	43	51	−8	35	Playoff
3	Atlante	36	11	11	14	57	69	−12	33	
4	Morelia	36	9	12	15	54	75	−21	30	
5	Correcaminos	36	9	10	17	42	65	−23	28	Relegated

==== General table ====
Pos	Team	Pld	W	D	L	GF	GA	GD	Pts	Qualification
8	Santos Laguna	36	13	9	14	61	62	−1	35	Qualification for the quarter-finals (Note: The first four places in the table and teams ranked 6th and 8th qualified for the Liguilla quarter-finals.)
9	Veracruz	36	12	11	13	43	51	−8	35	Qualification for the Repechaje (Note: Teams ranked 5th, 7th, 9th and 11th in the table qualified for Repechaje)
10	Atlante	36	11	11	14	57	69	−12	33	
11	Monterrey	36	9	15	12	37	52	−15	33	Qualification for the Repechaje
12	Toros Neza	36	12	8	16	55	62	−7	32	

Source: Liga MX
Rules for classification: 1) Points; 2) Goal difference; 3) Number of goals scored; 4) Head-to-head results between tied teams; 5) Number of goals scored away; 6) Highest relegation coefficient; 7) Fair Play points

===== Results by round =====
Round	1	2	3	4	5	6	7	8	9	10	11	12	13	14	15	16	17	18	19	20	21	22	23	24	25	26	27	28	29	30	31	32	33	34	35	36	37	38
Ground	H	A	H	A	H	A	H	A	H	A	H	A	H	A	H	A	H	A	H	A	H	A	H	A	H	A	H	A	H	A	H	A	H	A	H	A	H	A
Result	W	L	D	L	-	L	D	L	W	L	D	D	W	W	D	D	W	L	W	L	W	W	D	-	L	W	L	D	L	L	L	D	D	L	W	L	W	D
Position	5	10	9	16	17	18	16	18	15	18	18	18	15	13	11	11	8	12	9	11	9	8	7	10	9	9	9	9	9	10	11	12	13	13	12	13	13	10

Source: Competitive matches
A = Away; H = Home; W = Win; D = Draw; L = Loss; P = Postponed; = Leader, Qualification for the quarter-finals; C = Qualification for the quarter-finals as group leader.; E = Qualification for the quarter-finals as group runner-up.; R = Qualification for the Repechaje.

==== Matches ====
4 September 1994 1	Atlante	3-1	Correcaminos UAT	Benito Juarez
	Sanchez 23'; Salvador 48'; Romano 52'; (yellow card) 87' (yellow-red card) Andrade; Herrera (yellow card); Graniolatti (yellow card); Jose E. Garcia (yellow card)	Report	(red card) 43' Murillo; 82' (yellow card) Nildeson; (yellow card) Castillo	Stadium: Azulgrana; Attendance: 12,000; Referee: Antonio Marrufo

10 September 1994 2	Tigres UANL	2-0	Atlante	San Nicolas de los Garza
	Gilson da Costa 8'; Javier Lozano 15'			Stadium: Universitario

18 September 1994 3	Atlante	1-1	Toros Neza	Benito Juarez
	Sanchez 45'		75' Víctor Ríos	Stadium: Azulgrana

25 September 1994 4	CD Guadalajara	4-1	Atlante	Guadalajara
	de la Torre 29' (pen.), 50' (pen.); Felipe de Jesús Robles 64'; Guzman 68'		31' (pen.) Salvador	Stadium: Jalisco

30 September 1994 5	Atlante	bye	Leones Negros UdeG	Benito Juarez
				Stadium: Azulgrana

8 October 1994 6	Tiburones Rojos Veracruz	1-0	Atlante	Veracruz
	Carlos Poblete 73'			Stadium: Luis Pirata Fuente

16 October 1994 7	Atlante	2-2	Club América	Benito Juarez
	Rubén Omar Romano 35'; José Enrique García 42'		52' Luis Roberto Alves "Zague"; 77' Francois-Omam Biyik	Stadium: Azulgrana

22 October 1994 8	Pumas UNAM	2-1	Atlante	Coyoacan
	Rafael García 15'; Jorge Santillana 29'		34' Sanchez	Stadium: Olimpico

30 October 1994 9	Atlante	2-1	Tampico Madero	Benito Juarez
	Rubén Omar Romano 8', 48'		30' Tomás Cruz	Stadium: Azulgrana

6 November 1994 10	Necaxa	7-0	Atlante	Coyoacan
	Luis Hernández 9'; Luis Hernandez 66'; Luis Hernandez 89'; Ivo Basay 50'; Ivo Basay 53'; José María Higareda 59'; Alberto García Aspe 70' (pen.)			Stadium: Azteca

13 November 1994 11	Atlante	0-0	CD Toluca	Benito Juarez
				Stadium: Azulgrana

19 November 1994 12	CF Monterrey	1-1	Atlante	Monterrey
	Jesús Arellano 38'		65' Rubén Omar Romano	Stadium: Tecnológico

27 November 1994 13	Atlante	3-2	Club León	Benito Juarez
	Salvador 25' (pen.) 35' (pen.); Sanchez 46'		8' Isaac Ayipei; 50' (pen.) Gustavo Dezotti	Stadium: Azulgrana

30 November 1994 14	Atlas FC	0-1	Atlante	Guadalajara
			8' Rubén Omar Romano	Stadium: Jalisco

6 December 1994 15	Atlante	2-2	Tecos UAG	Benito Juarez
	Sanchez 58'; Salvador 67'		Eustacio Rizo 56'; Porfirio Jiménez 60' (pen.)	Stadium: Azulgrana

11 December 1994 16	Santos Laguna	2-2	Atlante	Torreon
	Benjamín Galindo 44'; Jesús Gómez 80'		27' Guillermo Cantú; 57' Gastón Obledo	Stadium: Revolución

17 December 1994 17	Atlante	3-1	Cruz Azul	Benito Juarez
	Sanchez 31', 87'; Salvador 61'		41' Hermosillo	Stadium: Azulgrana

23 December 1994 18	Atlético Morelia	2-1	Atlante	Morelia
	Arturo Reyna 12'; Luis Hernán Pérez 32'		50' Graniolatti	Stadium: Morelos

28 December 1994 19	Atlante	3-1	Puebla FC	Benito Juarez
	García 23' 56'; Sanchez 38'		Milton Queiroz "Tita" 2'	Stadium: Azulgrana

8 January 1995 20	Correcaminos UAT	1-0	Atlante	Ciudad Victoria
	Leopoldo Castañeda 65'			Stadium: Marte R. Gomez

14 January 1995 21	Atlante	2-1	Tigres UANL	Benito Juarez
	Salvador 30'; Sanchez 67'		32' Gustavo Nápoles	Stadium: Azulgrana

22 January 1995 22	Toros Neza	2-3	Atlante	Ciudad Nezahualcoyotl
	Juan Carlos Elizalde 84'; Martín Vilallonga 89'		25' Gastón Obledo; 62', 86'Salvador	Stadium: Neza 86

29 January 1995 23	Atlante	1-1	CD Guadalajara	Benito Juarez
	Romano 20'		89' Guzman	Stadium: Azulgrana

3 February 1995 24	Leones Negros UdeG	bye	Atlante	Guadalajara
				Stadium: Jalisco

12 February 1995 25	Atlante	0-2	Tiburones Rojos Veracruz	Benito Juarez
			38', 45' José Luis Malibrán	Stadium: Azulgrana

19 February 1995 26	Club América	1-4	Atlante	Coyoacan
	Luis Roberto Alves "Zague" 69'		1', 32'Sanchez; 20' Garcia; 85' Salvador	Stadium: Azteca

26 February 1995 27	Atlante	0-2	Pumas UNAM	Benito Juarez
			58' Pedro Massacessi; 64' Rafael García	Stadium: Azulgrana

5 March 1995 28	TM Gallos Blancos	1-1	Atlante	Queretaro
	Gerardo Silva 81'		57' Garcia	Stadium: Corregidora

12 March 1995 29	Atlante	0-3	Necaxa	Benito Juarez
			Alex Aguinaga 24', 67'; Alberto García Aspe 54'	Stadium: Azulgrana

19 March 1995 30	CD Toluca	4-2	Atlante	Toluca
	José Cardozo 31'; Jaime Jaramillo 61'; Eugenio Villazón 67'; Jorge Rodríguez 69'		45' 77' (pen.) Romano	Stadium: La Bombonera

26 March 1995 31	Atlante	1-2	CF Monterrey	Benito Juarez
	Sanchez 59'		38' Mario Jáuregui; 82' Fabián Guevara	Stadium: Azulgrana

2 April 1995 32	Club León	0-0	Atlante	Leon de los Aldama
				Stadium: Nou Camp

5 April 1995 33	Atlante	2-2	Atlas FC	Benito Juarez
	Salvador 45'; Romano 80'		12', 86' Jared Borguetti	Stadium: Azulgrana

9 April 1995 34	Tecos UAG	2-1	Atlante	Zapopan
	Osmar Donizette 7'; Claudio Morena 64'		Sanchez 55'	Stadium: 3 de Marzo

14 April 1995 35	Atlante	3-2	Santos Laguna	Benito Juarez
	Wilson Graneolatti 34'; Salvador 55'; Roberto Andrade 58'		Marcelo Carracedo 54', 64'	Stadium: Azulgrana

22 April 1995 36	Cruz Azul	4-1	Atlante	Coyoacan
	Hermosillo 15'; Delgado 55'; Zamora 57'; Mora 89'		79' Elizalde	Stadium: Azteca

28 April 1995 37	Atlante	4-1	Atlético Morelia	Coyoacan
	Salvador 49' (pen.), 64' (pen.); Guillermo Cantú 56'; Romano 61'		Jaime Vera 47'	Stadium: Azteca

5 May 1995 38	Puebla FC	6-6	Atlante	Puebla de los Angeles
	Tita 19', 80'; José Guadalupe Cruz 30' (o.g.), Narciso Cuevas 83'; Ali Fernández 88'; Marco Sánchez Yacuta 89' (pen.)		24'} Romano; 43' Jorge Salas; 56'Wilson Graneolatti; 60' (o.g.) Alexandre Pimentel; 75', 82' Salvador	Stadium: Cuauhtemoc

=== Copa Mexico ===
==== First round ====
25 January 1995	Guerreros Acapulco	1-1 (a.e.t.) (2-1 p)	Atlante	Acapulco
14:45 CT	Adrián Rodríguez 35'	Report	15' Luis Miguel Salvador	Stadium: Olimpico

=== CONCACAF Champions' Cup ===
==== Semifinals ====
3 February 1995	Atlante F.C. (Mexico)	2–1	(El Salvador) Alianza F.C.	San Jose, California
	Salvador 15'; Romano 43'		Durán 47'	Stadium: Spartan Stadium

==== Final ====
5 February 1995	Cartaginés (Costa Rica)	3–2	(Mexico) Atlante F.C.	San Jose, California
	Quiros 20', 32'; Hidalgo 69' (pen.)	Report	García 51'; Obledo 56'	Stadium: Spartan Stadium; Attendance: 6,270; Referee: (United States) Brian Hall

== Statistics ==
=== Players statistics ===
No.	Pos	Nat	Player	Total		Primera Division		1994-95 Copa Mexico	
No.	Pos	Nat	Player	Apps	Goals	Apps	Goals	Apps	Goals
1	GK	(Mexico) MEX	Hugo Pineda	35	0	35	0		
4	DF	(Mexico) MEX	Miguel Herrera	32	0	32	0		
2	DF	(Mexico) MEX	Jose Guadalupe Cruz						
5	DF	(Uruguay) URU	Wilson Graniolatti						
6	DF	(Uruguay) URU	José Enrique García	27	5	27	5		
-	MF	(Mexico) MEX	Roberto Andrade	28	1	28	1		
7	MF	(Mexico) MEX	Guillermo Cantú	29	2	29	2		
21	MF	(Mexico) MEX	Gastón Obledo	36	2	36	2		
10	MF	(Argentina) ARG	Ruben Omar Romano	30	12	30	12		
68	FW	(Mexico) MEX	Luis Miguel Salvador	30	15	30	15		
9	FW	(Mexico) MEX	Hugo Sanchez	31	13	31	13		
-	GK	(Mexico) MEX	Felix Fernandez	2	0	1+1	0		
-	DF	(Mexico) MEX	José Navarrete						
-	DF	(Mexico) MEX	Jorge Salas						
-	MF	(Mexico) MEX	Mario García						
-	FW	(United States) USA	Gerardo Mascareño	15	0	15	0		
8	MF	(Argentina) ARG	Jose A. Forte						
-	FW	(Argentina) ARG	Maxi Roditis						
	FW	(Mexico) MEX	Gaspar Cisneros						
	DF	(Mexico) MEX	Carlos A. Elizalde						

- Source: https://www.rsssf.org/tablesm/mex95.html
