= 1994–95 Tampico Madero-TM Gallos Blancos season =

Tampico Madero TM-Gallos Blancos
1994-95 season
- Owner: Antonio Pelaez Pier
- President: Antonio Pelaez
- Manager: Jose Camacho (until 1 December 1994); Juan de Dios Castillo
- Stadium: Tamaulipas (until 1 December 1994); Corregidora
- Primera Division: 19th (in 1995-96 Primera Division A)
- Copa Mexico: Quarterfinals
Home colours	Away colours
- All statistics correct as of 27 January 2019.

The 1994–95 Tampico Madero-TM Gallos Blancos season is the 4th campaign in existence and first season in the top flight division of Mexican football. The campaign is best remembered as the last season played in First Division.

== Summary ==
After the team was promoted from Second Division in summertime Owner Antonio Pelaez Pier reinforced the squad with several transfers in: Héctor Quintero (Veracruz), Ángel Torres (Puebla), Alejandro Domínguez (América), René Isidoro García (Atlante), Tomás Cruz (Atlante), Gerardo Silva (América), Álvaro Torres (Santos), Gerardo Jiménez (Monterrey), Guillermo Galindo (Querétaro) and Rubén Martínez (Santos). Club legend Forward Sergio Lira left the club transferred out to Puebla FC. Also Jose Camacho in his second season as manager renew his contract until 1995 along Panamanian Forward Victor Rene Mendieta.

The squad lost 9 matches in its first 15 games collapsing in the relegation table below Toros Neza. On 20 November 1994 the municipal government of Tampico sanctioned the club allegedly due to Pelaez did not pay the lease of Tamaulipas Stadium and banned the team to play at that field. The match on 19 November 1994 against Toros Neza was in fact the last First Division game played in the port.

After the ban, in a shockingly move, Owner Pelaez Pier transferred the franchise out from Tampico to Queretaro and leased the Corregidora Stadium until June 1995. Also, the team left its name Tampico Madero and was renamed TM-Gallos Blancos and even Pelaez sacked Jose Camacho as manager appointing Juan de Dios Castillo.

However, the squad collapsed for the second half of the season and on 2 April 1995 after a 0-1 defeat against CD Guadalajara the club was relegated to Primera Division A after just one single season.

== Squad ==
Note: Flags indicate national team as defined under FIFA eligibility rules; some limited exceptions apply. Players may hold more than one non-FIFA nationality.

No.	Pos.	Nation	Player
—	GK	MEX	Hector Quintero
—	DF	MEX	Oscar Torres
—	DF	PER	Alvaro Barco
—	DF	MEX	Guillermo Aranda
—	DF	HON	Arturo Chavez
—	MF	MEX	Salvador Vaca
—	MF	MEX	Alex Dominguez
—	MF	MEX	Gerardo Silva
—	MF	ESA	Mauricio Cienfuegos
—	FW	PAN	Rene Mendieta
—	FW	MEX	Hector del Angel

No.	Pos.	Nation	Player
—	GK	MEX	Javier Quintero
—	MF	MEX	Marcelino Perez
—	MF	MEX	Rene Isidoro Garcia
—	MF	ARG	Claudio Ubeda
—	MF	MEX	Tomas Cruz
—	DF	MEX	Guillermo Galindo
—	FW	MEX	Carlos Hernandez
—	DF	MEX	Ruben Martinez

=== Transfers ===
In
Pos.	Name	from	Type
DF	Claudio Ubeda	Rosario Central	

Out
Pos.	Name	To	Type
FW	Sergio Lira	Puebla FC	

==== Winter ====
In
Pos.	Name	from	Type
MF	Mauricio Cienfuegos	Universitario	

Out
Pos.	Name	To	Type

== Competitions ==
=== La Liga ===
==== League table ====
===== Group 1 =====
Pos	Team	Pld	W	D	L	GF	GA	GD	Pts	Qualification or relegation
1	Guadalajara	36	22	8	6	70	35	+35	52	Playoff
2	UNAM	36	15	11	10	49	36	+13	41	Playoff
3	Puebla	36	12	16	8	45	41	+4	40	Playoff
4	Toluca	36	10	8	18	44	57	−13	28	
5	Tampico Madero-TM Gallos	36	8	7	21	41	74	−33	23	Relegated

===== Overall Table =====
Pos	Team	Pld	W	D	L	GF	GA	GD	Pts
15	Morelia	36	9	12	15	54	75	−21	30
16	Toluca	36	10	8	18	44	57	−13	28
17	UAT	36	9	10	17	42	65	−23	28
18	UANL	36	7	10	19	34	50	−16	24
19	TM Gallos Blancos	36	8	7	21	41	74	−33	23

Source: Liga MX
Rules for classification: 1) Points; 2) Goal difference; 3) Number of goals scored; 4) Head-to-head results between tied teams; 5) Number of goals scored away; 6) Highest relegation coefficient; 7) Fair Play points

===== Results by round =====
Round	1	2	3	4	5	6	7	8	9	10	11	12	13	14	15	16	17	18	19	20	21	22	23	24	25	26	27	28	29	30	31	32	33	34	35	36	37	38
Ground	A	H	A	H	A	H	A	H	A	H	A	H	H	A	H	A	H	A	H	H	A	H	A	H	A	H	A	H	A	H	A	A	H	A	H	A	H	A
Result	W	W	L	L	D	W	L	W	W	L	-	D	D	W	D	L	W	D	W	D	L	D	L	D	W	L	W	L	L	-	L	D	D	D	W	W	L	L
Position	17	11	17	18	19	16	18	14	16	15	17	15	17	18	18	19	19	19	19	19	19	19	19	19	19	19	19	19	19	19	19	19	19	19	19	19	19	19

Source: Competitive matches
A = Away; H = Home; W = Win; D = Draw; L = Loss; P = Postponed; = Leader, Qualification for the quarter-finals; C = Qualification for the quarter-finals as group leader.; E = Qualification for the quarter-finals as group runner-up.; R = Qualification for the Repechaje.

==== Matches ====
4 September 1994 1	Toluca	3-0	Tampico Madero	Toluca
	Bernal 49'; Pavon 71'; Ayala 75'			Stadium: La Bombonera

10 September 1994 2	Tampico Madero	4-1	Monterrey	Tampico
	Gerardo Jiménez 12'; Rubén Martínez 23'; Héctor del Ángel 80'; René Mendieta 82'		10' Verdirame	Stadium: Tamaulipas

18 September 1994 3	León	3-0	Tampico Madero	Leon de los Aldama
	Isaac Ayipei 60'; Alfredo Murguía 67'; Luis Antonio Valdez 89'			Stadium: Nou Camp

24 September 1994 4	Tampico Madero	1-3	Atlas	Tampico
	Héctor del Ángel 72'		32' Sergio Pacheco; 80' Pardo; 89' Ubaldi	Stadium: Tamaulipas

30 September 1994 5	UAG	3-0	Tampico Madero	Zapopan
	Martín Dallorso 49'; Donizete 64'; Porfirio Jiménez 89' (pen.)			Stadium: 3 de Marzo

8 October 1994 6	Tampico Madero	4-2	Santos	Tampico
	Héctor del Ángel 8', 45'; Carlos Contreras 53'; Guillermo Galindo 72'		10' Adomaitis; 38' Ernesto Pérez	Stadium: Tamaulipas

15 October 1994 7	Cruz Azul	4-1	Tampico Madero	Tlalpan
	Hermosillo 9', 42'; Mora 50'; Pedro Duana 60'		65' René Mendieta	Stadium: Azteca

22 October 1994	Tampico Madero	4-0	Morelia	Tampico
	Carlos Hernández 43'; Héctor del Ángel 74'; 83'; René Mendieta 89'			Stadium: Tamaulipas

30 October 1994 9	Atlante FC	2-1	Tampico Madero	Benito Juarez
	Romano 8', 48'		30' Tomás Cruz	Stadium: Azulgrana

6 November 1994 10	Tampico Madero	1-1	UAT	Tampico
	Héctor del Ángel 33'		79' (pen.) Sergio Almaguer	Stadium: Tamaulipas

12 November 1994 11	UANL	4-1	Tampico Madero	San Nicolas de los Garza
	Antonio Carlos Santos 5' (pen.), 77'; Gustavo Nápoles 43'; Javier Lozano 88'		75' Héctor del Ángel	Stadium: Universitario

19 November 1994 12	Tampico Madero	3-0	Toros Neza	Tampico
	René Mendieta 10', 30' (pen.); Claudio Úbeda 20'			Stadium: Tamaulipas

27 November 1994 13	Guadalajara	1-0	Tampico Madero	Guadalajara
	Alberto Coyote 21'			Stadium: Jalisco

30 November 1994 14	Tampico Madero	bye	Leones Negros UdeG	Queretaro
				Stadium: Corregidora

3 December 1994 15	Veracruz	2-2	Tampico Madero	Veracruz
	Leonel Bolsonello 74'; Marco Antonio Benatto 89' "Marquinho"		43' Carlos Hernández; 48' Alejandro Domínguez	Stadium: Pirata Fuente
Note: On Dec. 7, due to problems with the leasing of Estadio Tamaulipas, Tampico Madero was relocated in Querétaro and renamed as TM Gallos Blancos.

11 December 1994 16	TM Gallos Blancos	2-8	América	Queretaro
12:00 CT	Héctor del Ángel 4'; Carlos Hernández 16'		27', 36', 59', 87' Zague; 40' (o.g.)Héctor Quintero; 67', 69' Biyik; 85' Kalusha	Stadium: Corregidora
Note: On December 7, due to problems between the club and Municipal government regards the leasing of Estadio Tamaulipas, Tampico Madero was relocated in Querétaro and renamed as TM Gallos Blancos.

16 December 1994 17	Pumas UNAM	3-0	TM Gallos Blancos	Tlalpan
	Olalde 41', 65'; Arturo Ortega 85'			Stadium: Olimpico Universitario

22 December 1994 18	Puebla	4-0	TM Gallos Blancos	Puebla de los Angeles
	Narciso Cuevas 49', 75', 85'; Edgar Plascencia 69'			Stadium: Cuauhtemoc

29 December 1994 19	TM Gallos Blancos	2-2	Necaxa	Queretaro
	René Mendieta 9'; Héctor del Ángel 24'		50' Alberto García Aspe; 73' Luis Hernández	Stadium: Corregidora

20	TM Gallos Blancos	2-0	CD Toluca	Queretaro
	Héctor del Ángel 27'; René Mendieta 47'			Stadium: Corregidora

14 January 1995 21	Monterrey	2-1	TM Gallos Blancos	Monterrey
	Mario Jauregui 45', 70'		42' René Mendieta	Stadium: Tecnológico

22 January 1995 22	TM Gallos Blancos	0-1	León	Queretaro
			37'Gerardo Reynoso	Stadium: Corregidora

28 January 1995 23	Atlas	1-0	TM Gallos Blancos	Guadalajara
	Borgetti 89'			Stadium: Jalisco

24	TM Gallos Blancos	0-1	Tecos UAG	Queretaro
				Stadium: Corregidora

12 February 1995 25	Santos Laguna	1-1	TM Gallos Blancos	Torreon
	Claudio Úbeda 13' (o.g.)		31' (o.g.) Jesús Gómez	Stadium: Corona

26	TM Gallos Blancos	0-2	Cruz Azul	Queretaro
			Luis Carlos de Oliveira "Pintado" 11'; Carlos Hermosillo 42'	Stadium: Corregidora

26 February 1995 27	Atlético Morelia	4-2	TM Gallos Blancos	Morelia
	Figueroa 2', 9' (pen.), 85' (pen.); Francisco Javier Gómez 83'		6' Claudio Úbeda; 71' Gerardo Jiménez	Stadium: Morelos

5 March 1995 28	TM Gallos Blancos	1-1	Atlante	Queretaro
	Gerardo Silva 81'		57' Garcia	Stadium: Corregidora

12 March 1995 29	UAT	0-0	TM Gallos Blancos	Ciudad Victoria
				Stadium: Marte R. Gomez

17 March 1995 30	TM Gallos Blancos	2-1	Tigres UANL	Queretaro
	Salvador Vaca 6'; Alejandro Domínguez 75'		78' Gilson da Costa	Stadium: Corregidora

26 March 1995 31	Toros Neza	3-1	TM Gallos Blancos	Ciudad Nezahualcoyotl
	Antonio Mohamed 1'; Guillermo Vázquez 51' (pen.); Martín Vilallonga 53'		76' Claudio Úbeda	Stadium: Neza 86

2 April 1995 32	TM Gallos Blancos	0-1	Guadalajara	Queretaro
			73' Jorge Arreola	Stadium: Corregidora

9 April 1995 33	Leones Negros UdeG	0-1	TM Gallos Blancos	Guadalajara
				Stadium: Jalisco

9 April 1995 34	TM Gallos Blancos	1-1	Veracruz	Queretaro
	Carlos Hernández 51'		4' José Luis Malibrán	Stadium: Corregidora

16 April 1995 35	América	4-0	TM Gallos Blancos	Tlalpan
12:00 CT	Kalusha Bwalya 16'; Luis García 37' del Olmo 39'; Biyik 66'			Stadium: Azteca

23 April 1995 36	TM Gallos Blancos	0-3	Pumas UNAM	Queretaro
			67', 81' Olalde; 85' (pen.) Campos	Stadium: Corregidora

30 April 1995 37	TM Gallos Blancos	1-0	Puebla FC	Queretaro
	Mauricio Cienfuegos 75'			Stadium: Corregidora

7 May 1995 38	Necaxa	2-3	TM Gallos Blancos	Tlalpan
	Sergio Zárate 53'; Efraín Herrera 84'		24' Gerardo Silva; 32', 60' Mendieta	Stadium: Azteca

== Statistics ==
=== Goalscorers ===
8. Marcelino Bernal
