= 1996–97 Atlético Morelia season =

Morelia
1996–97 season
- Manager: Jesús Bracamontes (until 1 September); Tomás Boy (from 2 September)
- Stadium: Estadio Morelos
- Invierno: 18th
- Verano: 8th Playoffs: Semifinals
- Copa México: Group stage
- Top goalscorer: League: Marco Antonio Figueroa (19 goals); All: Marco Antonio Figueroa (20 goals)
- Biggest win: Morelia 4–0 UAG (11 May 1997)
- Biggest defeat: América 5–1 Morelia (20 August 1996)
Home colours	Away colours
- All statistics correct as of 31 January 2019.

The 1997–97 Atlético Morelia season was the 82nd season in the football club's history and the 15th consecutive season in the top flight of Mexican football.

== Coaching staff ==
Position	Name
Head coach	(Mexico) Tomás Boy
Assistant coaches	(Mexico) Mauro Jácome
Assistant coaches	(Mexico) José Aceves
Fitness coach	(Argentina) Augusto Martín
Doctor	(Mexico) Rubén Trejo

== Players ==
=== Squad information ===
No.	Pos.	Nat.	Name	Date of birth (age)	Signed in	Previous club
Goalkeepers
1	GK	(Mexico)	Ricardo Martínez	7 April 1966 (aged 30)	1996	(Mexico) León
25	GK	(Mexico)	Fernando Piña	12 August 1966 (aged 29)		
Defenders
2	DF	(Argentina)	Carlos Bustos (Captain)	16 April 1966 (aged 30)	1996	(Argentina) Independiente
7	DF	(Mexico)	Silviano Delgado	4 September 1969 (aged 26)	1996	(Mexico) Toluca
11	DF	(Mexico)	Heriberto Morales	10 March 1975 (aged 21)	1995	(Mexico) Youth system
14	DF	(Mexico)	Roberto Hernández	11 July 1967 (aged 29)	1994	(Mexico) Monterrey
17	DF	(Mexico)	Rafael Bautista	7 October 1965 (aged 30)	1996	(Mexico) Monterrey
21	DF	(Mexico)	Jesús Gómez	14 May 1968 (aged 28)		
Midfielders
4	MF	(Mexico)	Javier Hernández	1 June 1961 (aged 35)	1995	(Mexico) UAG
10	MF	(Costa Rica)	Jafet Soto	1 April 1976 (aged 20)	1995	(Costa Rica) Herediano
13	MF	(Brazil)	Cleomar	11 August 1967 (aged 28)	1996 (Winter)	(Brazil) União São João
16	MF	(Mexico)	Jorge Chávez	6 February 1976 (aged 20)	1996	(Mexico) Youth system
18	MF	(Mexico)	Mario Juárez	19 January 1964 (aged 32)	1980	
20	MF	(Mexico)	Tomás López	21 December 1966 (aged 29)		
23	MF	(Mexico)	Pablo López	14 January 1974 (aged 22)		
26	MF	(Mexico)	Héctor Islas	8 September 1967 (aged 28)	1996	(Mexico) Cruz Azul
28	MF	(Mexico)	Andrés Garza	19 January 1974 (aged 22)		
58	MF	(Mexico)	Juan Carlos Chávez	18 January 1967 (aged 29)	1996	(Mexico) Atlas
Forwards
8	FW	(Chile)	Marco Antonio Figueroa (VC)	21 February 1962 (aged 34)	1986 (Winter)	(Chile) Everton
19	FW	(Mexico)	Everaldo Begines	12 July 1971 (aged 25)	1996	(Mexico) Santos Laguna
24	FW	(Mexico)	Emilio Mora	7 March 1978 (aged 18)	1996	(Mexico) Youth system
29	FW	(Brazil)	Claudinho	12 June 1968 (aged 28)	1997 (Winter)	(Brazil) Bahia

Players and squad numbers last updated on 31 January 2019.
Note: Flags indicate national team as has been defined under FIFA eligibility rules. Players may hold more than one non-FIFA nationality.

== Competitions ==
=== Overview ===
Competition	First match	Last match	Starting round	Final position	Record							
Competition	First match	Last match	Starting round	Final position	Pld	W	D	L	GF	GA	GD	Win %
Torneo Invierno	11 August 1996	24 November 1996	Matchday 1	18th	17	3	3	11	20	31	−11	17.65
Torneo Verano	11 January 1997	25 May 1997	Matchday 1	8th	23	10	7	6	35	27	+8	43.48
Copa México	30 June 1996	28 July 1996	Group stage	Group stage	8	3	1	4	10	12	−2	37.50
Total					48	16	11	21	65	70	−5	33.33

Source: RSSSF.com

=== Torneo Invierno ===
==== League table ====
Pos	Team	Pld	W	D	L	GF	GA	GD	Pts	Qualification or relegation
14	UAG	17	5	3	9	20	30	−10	18	
15	América	17	4	5	8	24	27	−3	17	
16	Celaya	17	5	2	10	19	33	−14	17	
17	Pachuca	17	3	6	8	25	36	−11	15	Team is last in Relegation table
18	Morelia	17	3	3	11	20	31	−11	12	

Source: Liga MX
Rules for classification: 1) Points; 2) Goal difference; 3) Number of goals scored; 4) Head-to-head results between tied teams; 5) Number of goals scored away; 6) Highest relegation coefficient; 7) Fair Play points

==== Results summary ====
Overall								Home						Away					
Pld	W	D	L	GF	GA	GD	Pts	W	D	L	GF	GA	GD	W	D	L	GF	GA	GD
17	3	3	11	20	31	−11	12	2	2	4	11	14	−3	1	1	7	9	17	−8

Source: Liga MX

=== Torneo Verano ===
==== League table ====
Pos	Team	Pld	W	D	L	GF	GA	GD	Pts	Qualification or relegation
6	UNAM	17	8	3	6	25	26	−1	27	Advance to Liguilla (Playoffs)
7	Santos Laguna	17	8	2	7	27	28	−1	26	Advance to Liguilla (Playoffs)
8	Morelia	17	6	7	4	26	23	+3	25	Advance to Repechage
9	Cruz Azul	17	7	4	6	21	24	−3	25	
10	León	17	5	8	4	21	18	+3	23	

Source: Liga MX
Rules for classification: 1) Points; 2) Goal difference; 3) Number of goals scored; 4) Head-to-head results between tied teams; 5) Number of goals scored away; 6) Highest relegation coefficient; 7) Fair Play points

==== Results summary ====
Overall								Home						Away					
Pld	W	D	L	GF	GA	GD	Pts	W	D	L	GF	GA	GD	W	D	L	GF	GA	GD
17	6	7	4	26	23	+3	25	4	4	1	15	10	+5	2	3	3	11	13	−2

Source: Liga MX

== Statistics ==
=== Goals ===
Rank	Player	Position	Invierno	Verano	Copa México	Total
1	(Chile) Marco Antonio Figueroa	FW	8	11	1	20
2	(Brazil) Claudinho	FW	0	11	0	11
3	(Mexico) Everaldo Begines	FW	2	1	4	7
4	(Mexico) Juan Carlos Chávez	MF	1	3	1	5
5	(Costa Rica) Jafet Soto	MF	2	2	0	4
6	(Argentina) Marcelo Carracedo	MF	2	0	1	3
6	(Mexico) Mario Juárez	MF	0	3	0	3
8	(Mexico) Andrés Garza	MF	2	0	0	2
8	(Mexico) Emilio Mora	FW	1	1	0	2
10	(Brazil) Cleomar	MF	0	1	0	1
10	(Mexico) Javier Hernández	MF	0	1	0	1
10	(Mexico) Heriberto Morales	DF	0	1	0	1
10	(Mexico) Héctor Nicanor	MF	0	0	1	1
Total			18	35	8	61

=== Hat-tricks ===
Player	Against	Result	Date	Competition
(Chile) Marco Antonio Figueroa	Pachuca	3–0 (H)	29 September 1996	Primera División

=== Own goals ===
Player	Against	Result	Date	Competition
(Mexico) Juan Carlos Chávez	Toluca	1–0 (A)	14 November 1996	Primera División

=== Clean sheets ===
Rank	Name	Invierno	Verano	Total
1	(Mexico) Ricardo Martínez	0	3	3
2	(Mexico) Miguel Ángel Murillo	2	0	2
3	(Mexico) Fernando Piña	0	2	2
Total		2	5	7
