= Johan Rodríguez =

Mexican footballer (born 1975)

Personal information
- Full name: Johan Rubén Rodríguez Álvarez
- Date of birth: 15 August 1975 (age 51)
- Place of birth: Monterrey, Nuevo León, Mexico
- Height: 1.76 m (5 ft 9 1/2 in)
- Position: Midfielder

Senior career*
Years	Team	Apps	(Gls)
1996–1998	Cruz Azul	60	(10)
1998–2004	Santos Laguna	204	(31)
2004–2005	Necaxa	39	(1)
2006	Morelia	7	(0)
2006–2007	Querétaro	17	(0)
Total		327	(42)

International career
2001–2002	Mexico	17	(2)
- * Club domestic league appearances and goals

Johan Rubén Rodríguez Álvarez (Note: In this Spanish name, the first or paternal surname is Rodríguez and the second or maternal family name is Álvarez.) (born 15 August 1975) is a Mexican former professional footballer who played as a midfielder.

== Career ==
Rodríguez made his football debut in 1996 with Cruz Azul, playing as a tough-tackling defensive midfielder behind international starters Benjamín Galindo and Carlos Hermosillo. The club won the Invierno 1997 championship and the CONCACAF Champions Cup tournaments of 1996 and 1997. However, it was not until he joined Santos in 1999 that he had major opportunities to demonstrate his skills. Rodríguez helped Santos to a runner-up finish in the Verano 2000 tournament and the league title in the Verano 2001 competition. He joined Necaxa in 2004, and later played for Morelia and Querétaro in the later stages of his career.

Rodríguez also represented the Mexico national team, earning 17 caps. Although his first appearance came under Enrique Meza in 2000, in a 2–0 loss to the United States, he is most associated with the era of Javier Aguirre. Rodríguez started in Aguirre's first match in charge of Mexico in 2001, a 1–0 victory over the United States. The result helped turn around a Mexican qualifying effort that had been disastrous up to that point. He scored goals against Liberia and El Salvador in 2001, both in friendly matches, and proceeded to solidify his place in the starting eleven through the 2001 Copa América and 2002 FIFA World Cup. Rodríguez's combative style was less valued by Aguirre's successor, Ricardo Antonio Lavolpe, who preferred Pável Pardo in central midfield, and he was not called up again after Aguirre left the coaching post. His last cap came in the World Cup second-round defeat to the United States on June 17, 2002.

After six months out injured and not having kicked a ball, he found it impossible to find a new club and decided instead to concentrate on his private businesses.

== Honours ==
Cruz Azul

- Mexican Primera División: Invierno 1997
- Copa México: 1996–97
- CONCACAF Champions' Cup: 1996; 1997

Santos Laguna

- Mexican Primera División: Verano 2001

== Career statistics ==
=== International ===
Scores and results list Mexico's goal tally first, score column indicates score after each Rodríguez goal.

List of international goals scored by Johan Rodríguez
No.	Date	Venue	Opponent	Score	Result	Competition
1	23 August 2001	Estadio Luis "Pirata" Fuente, Veracruz, Mexico	Liberia	2–0	5–4	Friendly
2	31 October 2001	Estadio Cuauhtémoc, Puebla, Mexico	El Salvador	2–0	4–1	Friendly
