= Gerardo Silva =

Gerardo Silva may refer to:

- Gerardo Silva (Mexican footballer) (born 1965), Mexican football manager and player
- Gerardo Silva (Chilean football manager) (born 1962)
- Gerardo de los Cobos Silva (born 1962), Mexican politician
