= José Guadarrama =

José Guadarrama may refer to:

- José Guadarrama Márquez (born 1948), Mexican politician
- José Alberto Guadarrama (born 1972), Mexican association football player
