= Jorge Castañeda (footballer) =

Mexican footballer (born 1970)

Tote Castañeda
Personal information
- Full name: Jorge Castañeda Reyes
- Date of birth: 12 January 1970 (age 56)
- Place of birth: Guadalajara, Mexico
- Height: 1.75 m (5 ft 9 in)
- Position: Midfielder

Senior career*
Years	Team	Apps	(Gls)
1987–1996	Club Atlas		
1997	Colorado Rapids	24	(0)
1999	Cruz Azul	4	(0)
2000	Tecos UAG	1	(0)

International career
1992	Mexico U23		

Managerial career
- 2007–2009: Club Atlas
- 2009–2010: Cruz Azul Hidalgo (assistant)
- 2012–2014: Dorados de Sinaloa(assistant)
- 2016–2017: América U-13(assistant)
- 2016: América U-13(Interim)
- 2017–2018: Club Necaxa Reserves and Academy
- 2018–2019: Necaxa (women) (Assistant)
- 2020: Tlaxcala (Assistant)
- * Club domestic league appearances and goals as of 19–07–10

Jorge "Tote" Castañeda Reyes (born 12 January 1970) is a Mexican former professional footballer who played as a midfielder during his career. He was the captain of the Mexico national football team competing at the 1992 Summer Olympics in Barcelona, Spain.

== Club career ==
In 1987, when he was eighteen, Castañeda signed with Club Atlas. He remained with Atlas until 1996. On 13 March 1997, Castañeda signed with the Colorado Rapids of Major League Soccer. He returned to Mexico and finished his career with Cruz Azul, Cruz Azul Hidalgo, Tecos de UAG, Tigrillos and Lobos de la BUAP.

Castañeda managed Atlas on an interim basis following Rubén Omar Romano's departure in September 2007.

== Personal life ==
Castañeda's brother, Guadalupe, was also a professional footballer.
