= Norberto Scoponi =

Argentine former football goalkeeper

Personal information
- Full name: Norberto Hugo Scoponi
- Date of birth: 13 January 1961 (age 65)
- Place of birth: Rosario, Santa Fe, Argentina
- Height: 1.88 m (6 ft 2 in)
- Position: Goalkeeper

Senior career*
| Years | Team | Apps | (Gls) |
| 1982–1994 | Newell's Old Boys | 380 | (0) |
| 1995–1997 | Cruz Azul | 66 | (0) |
| 1998–2000 | Independiente | 27 | (0) |
| Total | | 473 | (0) |

International career
| 1993–1994 | Argentina | 0 | (0) |

Managerial career
- 2004: Pachuca (assistant)
- 2005: Cruz Azul (assistant)
- 2006–2007: Atlas (assistant)
- 2008: América (assistant)
- 2010–2011: Santos Laguna (assistant)
- 2011: Atlas (assistant)
- 2012–2013: Morelia (assistant)
- 2013–2014: Puebla (assistant)
- 2014: Puebla (goalkeeping coach)
- 2015: Tijuana (assistant)
- 2019–2022: Mexico (assistant)
- 2023: Atlético Morelia (assistant)
- 2024: Atlético Morelia
- * Club domestic league appearances and goals

Norberto Hugo Scoponi (born 13 January 1961) is an Argentine former professional footballer who played as a goalkeeper. He was born in the city of Rosario in the Santa Fe Province of Argentina. He played the majority of his career for Newell's Old Boys of the Primera División Argentina where he won three Argentine league titles.

In 1995 Scoponi moved to Mexico to play for Cruz Azul, he returned to Argentina in 1998 to play for Club Atlético Independiente where he played until his retirement in 2000.

Scoponi was the reserve goalkeeper for Argentina during their victorious Copa América 1993 campaign and in the 1994 FIFA World Cup.

== Honours ==
Newell's Old Boys

- Primera División Argentina: 1987–88, 1990–91, Clausura 1992
- Copa Libertadores Runner-up: 1988, 1992

Cruz Azul

- Copa MX: 1996-97
- CONCACAF Champions Cup: 1996, 1997

Argentina

- Copa América: 1993
