= Juan de Dios Castillo =

Mexican footballer and manager (1951–2014)

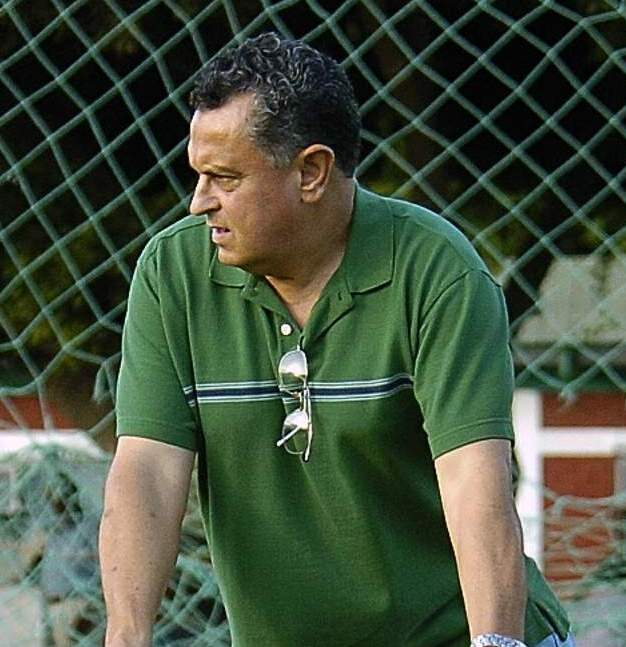

Personal information
- Full name: Juan de Dios Castillo González
- Date of birth: 31 January 1951
- Place of birth: Mexico City, Mexico
- Date of death: 1 May 2014 (aged 63)
- Place of death: Monterrey, Nuevo León, Mexico

Managerial career
- Years: Team
- 1989–1994: Mexico U-20
- 1994–1995: TM Gallos Blancos
- 1995–1996: Real Saltillo
- 1998–1999: Santos Laguna
- 2000: Durango
- 2001–2003: Cruz Azul Hidalgo
- 2003–2004: Real España
- 2005–2006: Marathón
- 2007: Atlético Mexiquense
- 2008: Olimpia
- 2009: Motagua
- 2010–2011: Honduras
- 2012: El Salvador
- 2013: Motagua

Juan de Dios Castillo González (31 January 1951 – 1 May 2014) was a Mexican footballer and coach, last with F.C. Motagua of the Liga Nacional de Fútbol de Honduras, the top tier of the Honduran football. He has coached in the Professional Mexican League, as well in the Honduras Professional League, being a 2 time Champion with Real España and Olimpia.

== Playing career ==
=== Club ===
He started playing professionally for Monterrey, in the Mexican league, he also played for Pachuca, San Luis, Toluca, Tampico Madero, Atlético Español and Unión de Curtidores, where he was called to be part of the Mexico national football team.

=== International ===
He was called up for the Mexico national football team.

== Managerial career ==
Castillo graduated from the National School of Football Coaches in 1983, starting to coach in all the possible Divisions in the Mexican league: 3rd Division, 2nd Division, 1st Division A, and First Division.

He was the 3rd best Mexican coach in the history of the Mexico national under-20 football team, with excellent numbers achieved a 5th place in the 1993 FIFA World Youth Championship.

With a percentage of victories of the 60%, and players such as Oswaldo Sánchez, Duilio Davino and Rafael García Torres, who participated in his under-20 football team, he formed, later, part of the Mexico national team that has played in the 2006 FIFA World Cup in Germany.

He also assisted Alfonso Portugal in the 1991 FIFA World Youth Championship in Portugal. After that, he managed Tampico Madero during the second half of the 1994-95 season. Castillo also coached the Santos Laguna team in Torreón, leading them to the 3rd place of the Group 4 in the 1999 tournament.

He then went on to coach in Honduras for Real España, winning the National Championship (Apertura) in 2003, runner-up (Apertura) with Marathón in 2005, and again Champion (Clausura) with Olimpia in 2008.

Then he coached the Primera División A, Atlético Mexiquense, which is the part of the Deportivo Toluca. He returned once more to Honduras in 2009, to coach his 4th team in that country, F.C. Motagua.

He is the 2nd coach in the history of the Honduran national league in coaching the 4 best teams in that country.

He became the head coach of the Honduras national football team on August 16, 2010, until January 2011.

After only 5 months in charge, he won the Copa Centroamericana in Panama against Costa Rica (2–1), after 16 years that Honduras could not win this regional cup.

His numbers in the Honduras national football team in 5 months are: 5 wins, 3 draws, and 2 losses.

He was appointed as head coach of El Salvador national football team in July 2012.

== Death ==
Castillo died on 1 May 2014, due to skin cancer.

== Honours ==
- Champion in qualification tournament to the 1991 FIFA World Youth Championship (Mexican team eliminated in Quarter-finals)
- Champion in qualification tournament to the 1993 FIFA World Youth Championship (the Mexican team reached the fifth place)
- Silver Medal in the 1993 Central American and Caribbean Games in Puerto Rico
- Champion with Real España in the 2003–04 Honduran Liga Nacional (Apertura)
- Runner-up with Marathón in the 2005–06 Honduran Liga Nacional (Apertura)
- Champion with Olimpia in the 2007–08 Honduran Liga Nacional (Clausura)
- 2011 Copa Centroamericana with the Honduras national football team
