= Guadalupe Castañeda =

Mexican footballer (born 1965)

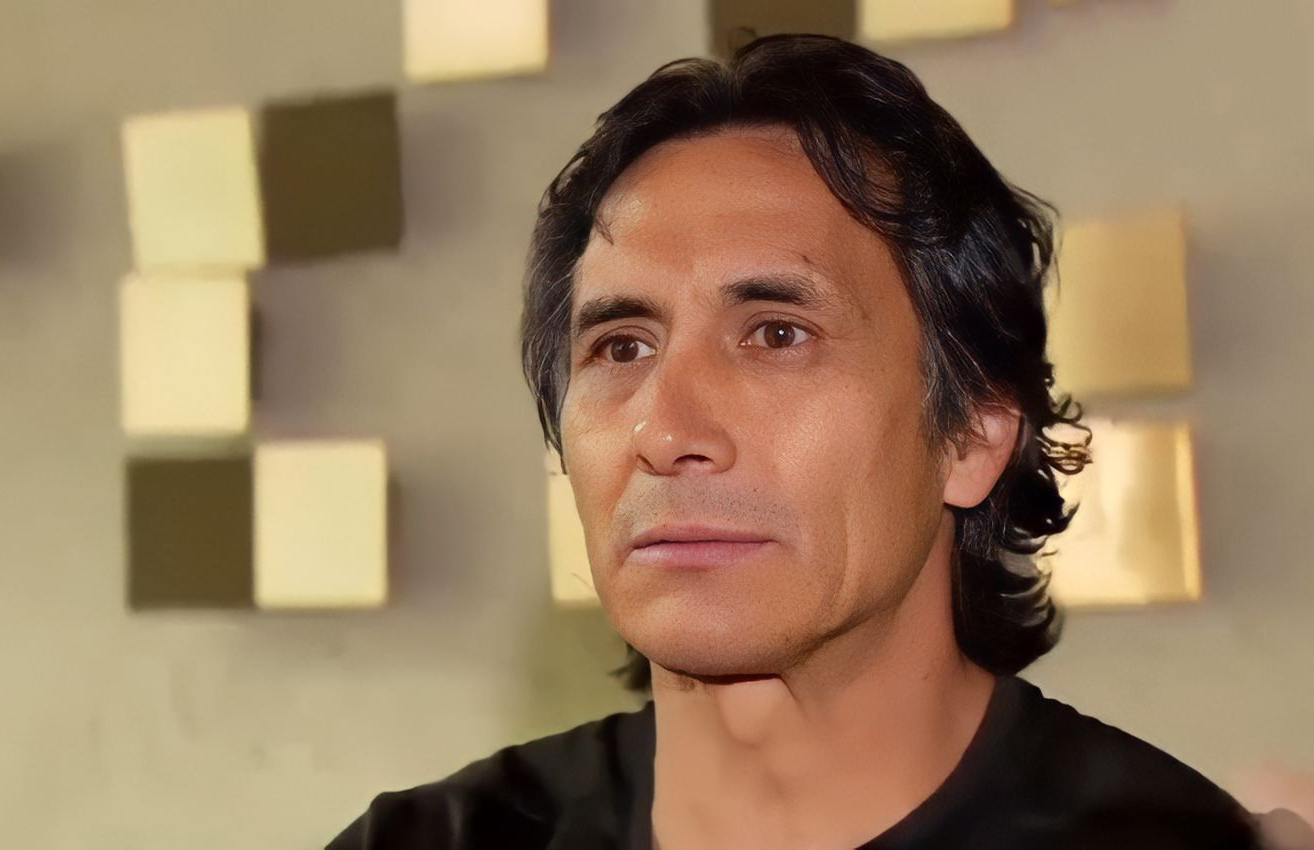
- Castañeda in 2015

Personal information
- Full name: Guadalupe Castañeda
- Date of birth: 24 February 1965 (age 61)
- Place of birth: Fresnillo, Zacatecas, Mexico
- Height: 1.72 m (5 ft 8 in)
- Position: Defender

Senior career*
Years	Team	Apps	(Gls)
1986–1987	Atlas	22	(1)
1990–1993	León	112	(2)
1993–2000	Cruz Azul	236	(1)
2000–2003	Guadalajara	68	(0)
2003–2004	Dorados	27	(2)
2004–2005	León	34	(2)
2005–2006	Dorados	13	(1)
Total		479	(5)

International career
1991–1993	Mexico	7	(0)
- * Club domestic league appearances and goals

Guadalupe Castañeda (born 24 February 1965) is a Mexican former footballer who played for various clubs in Mexico.

== Club career ==
A defender capable of lining up on either flank, Castañeda played eight years with Cruz Azul and later represented Chivas de Guadalajara. Nicknamed Lupillo, he began his career with Atlas in 1986–87 and moved to León in 1990, winning a starting fullback spot as León won the tournament championship title in the 1991–92 season. In 1993 Castañeda joined Cruz Azul, beginning a spell of club success that lasted until the end of 2000: Invierno 1997 title and CONCACAF Champions' Cup titles (1996 and 1997). He was transferred to Chivas in 2001, playing two and a half years at the Guadalajara club, then moved into the México Segunda División (Second Division) club Dorados de Sinaloa. The club was promoted and he ended his career in the Primera División (First or top League Division) at the Clausura 2006 campaign at the age of 41.

Castañeda scored only 5 goals in 479 recorded top-flight matches. The most significant of these was a last-minute goal for Cruz Azul against UNAM in the quarterfinal round of the 1994–95 playoffs, converting the rebound after Pumas goalkeeper Jorge Campos had saved a penalty. The goal secured Cruz Azul's place in the semifinals.

== International career ==
Castañeda also earned seven caps for the Selección de fútbol de México (Mexico national team). His first international match was a 3–0 victory against Canada national team on 14 March 1991. He was recalled to the squad by coach Miguel Mejía Baron in 1993 and made several additional appearances, but was unable to dislodge incumbent Ramón Ramírez from the left fullback position. Castañeda's last cap came in a 0–0 draw against defending FIFA World Cup champion Die deutsche Fußballnationalmannschaft (Germany national team) on 22 December 1993.

== Personal life ==
Castañeda's brother, Jorge, was also a professional footballer.

== Honours ==
León

- Mexican Primera División: 1991–92

Cruz Azul

- Mexican Primera División: Invierno 1997
- Copa México: 1996–97
- CONCACAF Champions' Cup: 1996, 1997

Sinaloa

- Primera División A: Apertura 2003
