= Álvaro Barco =

Peruvian footballer (born 1967)

Personal information
- Full name: José Álvaro Barco Andrade
- Date of birth: 27 June 1967 (age 59)
- Place of birth: Lima, Peru
- Height: 1.77 m (5 ft 10 in)
- Position: Defender

Youth career
- Alianza Atlético
- 1985–1987: Universitario

College career
Years	Team	Apps	(Gls)
1987–1988	LIU Brooklyn Blackbirds		

Senior career*
Years	Team	Apps	(Gls)
1984	Alianza Atlético	0	(0)
1988	Gardenias	0	(0)
1989–1992	Universitario		
1993	Cobreloa	23	(1)
1994	Palestino	30	(4)
1995	Tampico Madero	13	(0)
1996–1997	Universitario		
1997–1998	Shenzhen Pingan		
1998	Al Nassr		

International career
1986–1997	Peru	30	(0)

Managerial career
- 2001: Universitario
- 2008: Universidad San Martín
- * Club domestic league appearances and goals

José Álvaro Barco Andrade (born 27 June 1967), known as Álvaro Barco, is a Peruvian former footballer who played as a defender for clubs in Peru and Chile. He made 30 appearances for the Peru national team.

== Playing career ==
=== Club ===
Born in Lima, Peru, Barco began playing youth football with local clubs Alianza Atlético and Universitario de Deportes. He also represented Alianza Atlético and Gardenias from San Isidro in the Copa Perú in 1984 and 1988, respectively. He played collegiate soccer for LIU Brooklyn Blackbirds, the athletic team of Long Island University in the United States with his brother Fernando. He returned to Peru to play professionally with Universitario, as well as C.D. Palestino and Cobreloa in Chile. He also had brief spells with Mexican side Tampico Madero in 1994–95 season and Shenzhen Pingan in China.

=== International ===
Barco made 30 appearances for the Peru national team from 1986 to 1997. He participated in the 1991 Copa América and the 1993 Copa América in Ecuador.

== Managerial career ==
Following his playing career, he became a manager, leading Universitario de Deportes and Universidad San Martín de Porres.
