= 1997 CONCACAF Champions' Cup =

33rd edition of premier club football tournament organized by CONCACAF

Tournament details
- Host country: United States
- Cities: Washington, D.C.
- Dates: August 13–24
- Teams: 8 (from 6 associations)

Final positions
- Champions: (Mexico) Cruz Azul (5th title)
- Runners-up: (United States) Los Angeles Galaxy

Tournament statistics
- Matches played: 8
- Goals scored: 27 (3.38 per match)

The 1997 CONCACAF Champions' Cup was the 33rd edition of the annual international club football competition, the CONCACAF Champions' Cup. It determined that year's club champion of the CONCACAF region (North America, Central America and the Caribbean).

The teams were split into three zones (North, Central and Caribbean). The North American zone qualified three teams direct into the quarterfinals and two teams played a play-off for the fourth spot in the quarterfinals. The Central American zone played a regional tournament to get three spots in the quarterfinal. The winner of the Caribbean zone got a place in the quarterfinals.

1997 was the first year that teams from Major League Soccer took part in the Champions' Cup. The competitors in the MLS Cup, both winner and runner-up, were each given berths in the tournament.

All but two of the eight games played in the final tournament were played in Washington, D.C.. The final was won by Cruz Azul, who captured their fifth Champions' Cup title with a 5–3 victory over the Los Angeles Galaxy. At the time, Mexican goalkeeper Jorge Campos was signed to the Galaxy and Cruz Azul. The Galaxy were the first American club to reach the final of a Champions Cup or League.

== Preliminary Regional playoffs ==
=== North American Zone ===
Team 1	Score	Team 2
Los Angeles Galaxy (United States)	4–1	(Mexico) Santos Laguna

July 30, 1997	Los Angeles Galaxy (United States)	4–1	(Mexico) Santos Laguna	Los Angeles
	Mauricio Cienfuegos 64'; Eduardo Hurtado 65'; Martín Machón 80'; Welton Mello 84'		Nicolás Ramírez 70'	Stadium: Rose Bowl

- Los Angeles Galaxy advance to the quarterfinal.

=== Central American Zone ===
==== Preliminary round ====
Team 1	Agg.	Team 2	1st leg	2nd leg
A.F.C. Euro Kickers (Panama)	5–6	(Nicaragua) Diriangén FC	4–2	1–4

A.F.C. Euro Kickers (Panama)	4–2	(Nicaragua) Diriangén FC	Estadio Artes y Oficios
Jorge Bovell; José Ardines; Wilchard		Sergio Gago; Harry Cruz

June 9, 1997	Diriangén FC (Nicaragua)	4–1 (6–5 agg.)	(Panama) A.F.C. Euro Kickers	Cacique Diriangén Stadium
	Jose Maria Bermudez; Sergio Gago; Lester González		José Ardines

==== First round ====
Team 1	Agg.	Team 2	1st leg	2nd leg
CS Cartaginés (Costa Rica)	9–2	(Panama) Tauro	5–0	4–2
FAS (El Salvador)	2–2 (3–5 pen)	(Guatemala) CSD Comunicaciones	1–1	1–1
Xelajú MC (Guatemala)	2–0	(Belize) Real Verdes	0–0	2–0
Juventus (Belize)	4–2	(Honduras) Real CD España	0–1	4–1
Luis Ángel Firpo (El Salvador)	3–1	(Honduras) Olimpia	0–0	3–1
Diriangén FC (Nicaragua)	4–5	(Costa Rica) Alajuelense	3–2	1–3

CS Cartaginés (Costa Rica)	5–0	(Panama) Tauro	Cartago, Costa Rica
Jewisson Bennett; Heriberto Quirós; Norman Gómez		Nil	Stadium: José Rafael"Fello"Meza Ivancovich Stadium

Tauro (Panama)	2–4 (2–8 agg.)	(Costa Rica) CS Cartaginés	Panama City, Panama
Gustavo Lagarcha		Heriberto Quirós; Cristian Mena; Norman Gómez	Stadium: Rommel Fernández Stadium

FAS (El Salvador)	1–1	(Guatemala) CSD Comunicaciones
Guillermo Rivera		Milton "Tyson" Núñez

CSD Comunicaciones (Guatemala)	1–1 (2–2 (pen agg.)	(El Salvador) FAS
Everaldo Valencia		Carlos Villareal

Real Verdes (Belize)	0–0	(Guatemala) Xelajú MC
Nil		Nil

June 2, 1997	Xelajú MC (Guatemala)	2–0 (2–0 agg.)	(Belize) Real Verdes	San Ignacio’s Norman Broaster Stadium
	Gustavo Benzomo; Cesar Trujillo		Nil

Real CD España (Honduras)	1–0	(Belize) Juventus
Guillermo Gómez 62'		Nil

May 29, 1997	Juventus (Belize)	4–1 (4–2 agg.)	(Honduras) Real CD España	Francisco Morazán Stadium
	David McCaulay 2'; Norman Nuñez 29'; Norman Nuñez 45'; John McAllet 52'		Orbin Cabrera 88'

	Luis Ángel Firpo (El Salvador)	0–0	(Honduras) Olimpia	Usulután, El Salvador
May 28, 1997	Nil		Nil	Stadium: Estadio Sergio Torres, Usulután; Attendance: 6,000

June 4, 1997	Olimpia (Honduras)	1–3 (1–3 agg.)	(El Salvador) Luis Ángel Firpo
	Wilmer Velasquez 24'		Fabio de Freitas 38'; Juan Gámez 43'; Percival Piggott 60'

June 22, 1997	Diriangén FC (Nicaragua)	3–2	(Costa Rica) Alajuelense	Dirimbia, Nicaragua
	Tyrone Acevedo 22'; José María Bermúdez 27'; Léster González 68'		Josef Miso 14'; Ronald Chaves 58'	Stadium: Estadio Cacique Diriangén

Alajuelense (Costa Rica)	3–1 (5–4 agg.)	(Nicaragua) Diriangén FC	Alajuela, Costa Rica
Luis Diego Arnaez; Ronald Chavez; Harold Wallace		Goal	Stadium: Alejandro Morera Soto Stadium

==== Second round ====
Team 1	Agg.	Team 2	1st leg	2nd leg
Juventus (Belize)	2–8	(Guatemala) CSD Comunicaciones	0–3	2–5
Xelajú MC (Guatemala)	2–3	(El Salvador) C.D. Luis Ángel Firpo	2–1	0–2
CS Cartaginés (Costa Rica)	2–1	(Costa Rica) L.D. Alajuelense	2–1	–

- Comunicaciones, Luis Ángel Firpo and Cartaginés advance to the quarterfinal. Cartaginés vs Alajuelense played in one leg in San José.

June 22, 1997	Juventus (Belize)	0–3	(Guatemala) CSD Comunicaciones	Belize
	Nil		Julio Rodas; Castro (o.g.); Rigoberto Gómez	Stadium: People’s Stadium in Orange Walk

June 28, 1997	CSD Comunicaciones (Guatemala)	5–2 (8–2 agg.)	(Belize) Juventus	Guatemala City, Guatemala
	Rigoberto Gómez; Nicolas Suazo; Byron Perez; TBD		Norman Núñez	Stadium: Cementos Progreso Stadium

Xelajú MC (Guatemala)	2–1	(El Salvador) C.D. Luis Ángel Firpo
Posse; Mora		Raul Toro

C.D. Luis Ángel Firpo (El Salvador)	2–0 (3–2 agg.)	(Guatemala) Xelajú MC
Raul Toro; Israel Castro		Nil

CS Cartaginés (Costa Rica)	2–1 (2–1 agg.)	(Costa Rica) L.D. Alajuelense
Sergio Morales		Luis Diego Arnáez

=== Caribbean Zone ===
==== CFU Club Championship final ====
August 2, 1997	United Petrotrin (Trinidad and Tobago)	2–1 (g.g.)	(Jamaica) Seba United
	Prosper 44'; Jones 95'		Hill 56'

- United Petrotrin advance to the quarterfinal

== Quarterfinal Qualified teams ==
=== North American zone ===
- Major League Soccer:

(United States) D.C. United – 1996 MLS Cup winner
(United States) Los Angeles Galaxy – preliminary round winner (1996 MLS Cup runner-up)

- Primera División de México:

(Mexico) Guadalajara – 1997 Verano winner
(Mexico) Cruz Azul – 1996 CONCACAF Champions Cup title holder

=== Central American zone ===
- Central American Qualifiers:
  (Costa Rica) C.S. Cartaginés – Second Round Series winner
  (El Salvador) C.D. Luis Ángel Firpo – Second Round Series winner
  (Guatemala) CSD Comunicaciones – Second Round Series winner

=== Caribbean zone ===
- Caribbean Football Union (CFU):
  (Trinidad and Tobago) United Petrotrin – 1997 CFU Club Championship winner

== Bracket ==
Quarterfinals
(United States) D.C. United	1
(Trinidad and Tobago) United Petrotrin	0
(United States) Los Angeles Galaxy	2
(El Salvador) Luis Ángel Firpo	0
(Mexico) Guadalajara	1
(Costa Rica) Cartaginés	0
(Mexico) Cruz Azul	5
(Guatemala) Comunicaciones	0

Semifinals
(United States) D.C. United	0
(United States) Los Angeles Galaxy	1
(Mexico) Guadalajara	2
(Mexico) Cruz Azul	3

Final
(United States) Los Angeles Galaxy	3
(Mexico) Cruz Azul	5
Third place
(United States) D.C. United	2
(Mexico) Guadalajara	2

== Quarter-finals ==
August 12, 1997

Los Angeles Galaxy (United States)	2–0	(El Salvador) C.D. Luis Ángel Firpo
Welton 45'; Hurtado 78'

Robert F. Kennedy Memorial Stadium
Washington, D.C. – United States
August 12, 1997

D.C. United (United States)	1–0	(Trinidad and Tobago) United Petrotrin
Etcheverry 84'

Robert F. Kennedy Memorial Stadium
Washington, D.C. – United States

August 16, 1997

Cruz Azul (Mexico)	5–0	(Guatemala) CSD Comunicaciones
Galindo 5', 57'; Yegros 42'; Hermosillo 56'; Palencia 78'

Estadio Azul
Mexico, D.F. – Mexico
August 17, 1997

Guadalajara (Mexico)	1–0	(Costa Rica) C.S. Cartaginés
Robles 34'

Estadio Jalisco
Guadalajara, Jalisco – Mexico

== Semi-finals ==
August 22, 1997

D.C. United (United States)	0–1	(United States) Los Angeles Galaxy
		Jones 10'

Robert F. Kennedy Memorial Stadium
Washington, D.C. – United States
August 22, 1997

Guadalajara (Mexico)	2–3	(Mexico) Cruz Azul
Sánchez 86' (pen.); Martínez 90'		Sánchez 26' (o.g.); Yegros 36'; Adomaitis 77'

Robert F. Kennedy Memorial Stadium
Washington, D.C. – United States

== Third place match ==
August 24, 1997

D.C. United (United States)	2–2	(Mexico) Guadalajara
Díaz Arce 40'; Iroha 89'		Acosta 55'; Sánchez 86' (pen.)

Robert F. Kennedy Memorial Stadium
Washington, D.C. – United States
- Third place was shared.

== Final ==
August 24, 1997
18:10 UTC-4

Los Angeles Galaxy (United States)	3–5	(Mexico) Cruz Azul
Hurtado 8', 14'; Campos 78'		Galindo 30' (pen.); Rodríguez 31'; Adomaitis 36'; Hermosillo 62', 66'

Robert F. Kennedy Memorial Stadium
Washington, D.C. – United States

Team details

Los Angeles Galaxy	Cruz Azul

GK	9	(Mexico) Jorge Campos
DF	20	(United States) Paul Caligiuri
DF	2	(United States) Danny Pena
DF	4	(United States) Robin Fraser
DF	18	(United States) Greg Vanney
MF	14	(United States) Chris Armas
MF	5	(Guatemala) Martín Machón	(substituted off) 72'
MF	6	(United States) Dan Calichman	(substituted off) 46'
MF	10	(El Salvador) Mauricio Cienfuegos	(substituted off) 21'
FW	13	(United States) Cobi Jones
FW	29	(Ecuador) Eduardo Hurtado
Substitutions:
FW	8	(United States) Jose Botello	(substituted on) 21'
GK		(United States) Kevin Hartman	(substituted on) 46'
DF		(Saint Vincent and the Grenadines) Ezra Hendrickson	(substituted on) 72'
Manager:
(Ecuador) Octavio Zambrano

GK	1	(Mexico) Óscar Pérez
DF	18	(Mexico) Johan Rodríguez
DF	23	(Mexico) Moisés González
DF	4	(Peru) Juan Reynoso
DF	2	(Mexico) Guadalupe Castañeda
MF	10	(Argentina) Héctor Adomaitis
MF	13	(Mexico) Carlos Barra	(substituted off) 67'
MF	19	(Mexico) Ómar Rodríguez	(substituted off) 76'
MF	7	(Mexico) Benjamín Galindo
FW	15	(Mexico) Francisco Palencia	(substituted off) 73'
FW	27	(Mexico) Carlos Hermosillo
Substitutes:
MF		(Mexico) Agustín Morales	(substituted on) 67'
FW		(Paraguay) Julio C. Yegros	(substituted on) 76'
MF		(Mexico) Héctor Altamirano	(substituted on) 73'
Manager:
(Mexico) Luis Fernando Tena

== Champion ==
CONCACAF Champions' Cup
1997 Winners

Cruz Azul
Fifth title
