= Gerardo de los Cobos Silva =

Mexican politician

- Born: 11 April 1962 (age 64); Guanajuato, Mexico
- Occupation: Politician
- Political party: PAN

José Gerardo de los Cobos Silva (born 11 April 1962) is a Mexican politician from the National Action Party. He has served as a federal deputy of the LVI and LXI Legislatures of the Mexican Congress representing Guanajuato, as well as a local deputy in the Congress of Guanajuato.
