= Marco Capetillo =

Mexican footballer (born 1976)

Personal information
- Full name: Marco Antonio Capetillo Hernández
- Date of birth: 17 February 1976 (age 50)
- Place of birth: Mexico City, Mexico
- Height: 1.71 m (5 ft 7 in)
- Position: Forward

Senior career*
Years	Team	Apps	(Gls)
1995–1997	América	21	(1)
1998–1999	Atlante	20	(0)
1999–2003	Puebla	113	(15)
2003–2005	Necaxa	41	(2)
2005	Lagartos de Tabasco		
2006	Lobos BUAP		
2006–2007	TR de Coatzacoalcos		
2010	Puebla		

Managerial career
- 2015–2016: Puebla Reserves and Academy
- 2016–2017: Puebla (Assistant)
- 2017–2018: Celaya (Assistant)
- 2018–2020: Zacatepec (Assistant)
- 2020–2022: Atlético Morelia (Assistant)
- 2022–2023: Tijuana (Assistant)
- 2023–2025: Venezuela U-20 (Assistant)
- 2025: Puebla (Assistant)
- * Club domestic league appearances and goals

Marco Antonio Capetillo Hernández (born 17 February 1976) is a Mexican football coach and a former player who played as striker. He made his professional debut with Club América on 12 March 1995, coming on as a substitute against Toros Neza.
