= Luis Fernando Tena =

Mexican footballer and manager (born 1958)

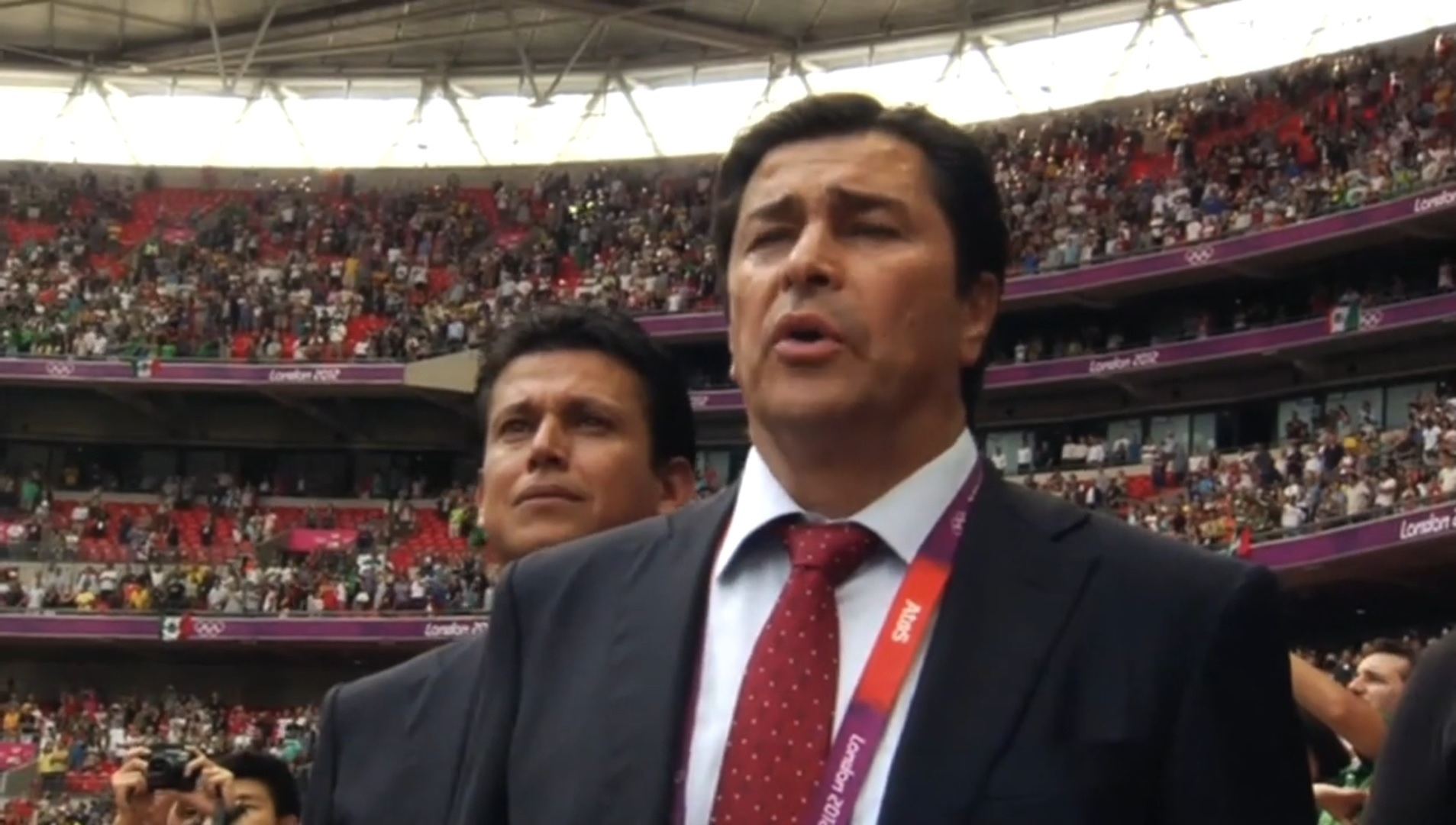
- Tena (right) at the 2012 Summer Olympics

Personal information
- Full name: Luis Fernando Tena Garduño
- Date of birth: 20 January 1958 (age 68)
- Place of birth: Mexico City, Mexico
- Height: 1.80 m (5 ft 11 in)
- Position: Midfielder

Team information
- Current team: Guatemala (manager)

Senior career*
| Years | Team | Apps | (Gls) |
| 1976–1982 | Atlético Español | 190 | (2) |
| 1982–1983 | Oaxtepec | 32 | (0) |
| 1983–1986 | Guadalajara | 46 | (0) |
| 1987–1988 | Atlante | 45 | (1) |

Managerial career
- 1994–1996: Cruz Azul
- 1996–1997: Tecos
- 1997–2000: Cruz Azul
- 2000–2001: Morelia
- 2002–2003: Santos Laguna
- 2004: Cruz Azul
- 2005–2006: Chiapas
- 2006–2007: América
- 2008–2009: Morelia
- 2009–2010: Chiapas
- 2010–2013: Mexico (assistant)
- 2011–2012: Mexico U23
- 2013: Mexico (caretaker)
- 2014–2015: Cruz Azul
- 2016: León
- 2017–2018: Querétaro
- 2019–2020: Guadalajara
- 2021: Juárez
- 2021–: Guatemala
Medal record
Men's football
Representing Mexico (as manager)
Olympic Games
| Gold medal – first place | 2012 London | Team |
Pan American Games
| Gold medal – first place | 2011 Guadalajara | Team |
- * Club domestic league appearances and goals

Luis Fernando Tena Garduño (born 20 January 1958) is a Mexican professional football manager and former player who is the head coach of the Guatemala national team.

Across a distinguished career spanning more than thirty years, Tena has managed ten Mexican clubs, capturing two Primera División titles and three CONCACAF Champions Cup trophies. His greatest achievement came at the 2012 Summer Olympics in London, when he guided Mexico to a historic gold medal.

His brother, Alfredo, is also a manager and former footballer.

== Club career ==
Born in Mexico City on January 20, 1958, Tena began his professional career with Atlético Español in 1976. He later played for Oaxtepec and Guadalajara before finishing his career with Atlante, where he retired in 1988.

== Managerial career ==
=== Cruz Azul ===
After retiring as a player, he began his coaching career in 1994 with Cruz Azul, the club where he achieved his greatest success and with which he is most closely identified, having managed the team on four occasions.

In his first spell, he turned Cruz Azul into a league contender and lifted the 1996 CONCACAF Champions' Cup, his first title as a coach. In his second spell, he reached his greatest triumph: winning the Invierno 1997 championship, which ended a nearly 17-year league title drought. Earlier that same year, he had also secured the 1997 CONCACAF Champions' Cup. He later returned for a fourth stint, delivering the club’s sixth CONCACAF Champions' Cup title.

=== Monarcas Morelia ===
After his initial tenure with Cruz Azul, Tena took charge of Monarcas Morelia, a club then seeking prominence. In his first campaign, he guided the team to their first league title, the Invierno 2000 championship.

=== América ===
In 2006, Tena faced one of the biggest challenges of his career when he managed Club América. He led the team to the final of the Clausura 2007, but ultimately lost to Pachuca.

In November 2010, he was appointed assistant coach to José Manuel de la Torre with the Mexico national team. However, starting in March 2011, he took charge of the under-23 side.

In October 2011, he guided the team to a gold medal at the Pan American Games in Guadalajara, defeating Argentina 1–0 in the final. In April 2012, Mexico qualified for the Summer Olympics in London by beating Honduras 2–1 in extra time in the pre-Olympic final.

At the Olympics, Mexico advanced from the group stage as leaders. They faced Senegal in the quarterfinals, winning 4–2 in extra time. Three days later, they defeated Japan 3–1 to reach the final. Mexico secured the Olympic gold medal in football by defeating Brazil 2–1 at Wembley Stadium. This accomplishment is widely regarded as one of the most significant milestones in the history of Mexican football and, more broadly, in the nation’s sporting achievements.

=== Guadalajara ===
In 2019, Tena was appointed head coach of Guadalajara during a complicated period for the institution. He managed to lift the squad’s spirits and qualified the team for the Guardianes 2020 playoffs. However, after an inconsistent start in the following tournament, he was dismissed.

=== Guatemala ===
On 9 December 2021, he became the manager of the Guatemala national team.

== Honours ==
=== Manager ===
Cruz Azul

- Mexican Primera División: Invierno 1997
- CONCACAF Champions League: 1996, 1997, 2013–14

Morelia

- Mexican Primera División: Invierno 2000

Mexico U23

- Olympic Gold Medal: 2012
- Pan American Games: 2011
- CONCACAF Olympic Qualifying Championship: 2012
- Toulon Tournament: 2012
