= Hugo Pineda =

Mexican footballer (born 1962)

Personal information
- Date of birth: 10 May 1962 (age 64)
- Place of birth: Tampico, Tamaulipas, Mexico
- Position: Goalkeeper

Senior career*
Years	Team	Apps	(Gls)
–1983	Atlético Morelia		
1983–1990	Tampico Madero		
1990–1992	Leones Negros UdeG		
1992–1993	Correcaminos UAT		
1993–1994	Leones Negros UdeG		
1994–1995	Atlante		
1995–1996	Atlético Celaya		
1996–1999	América		
1999–2000	Necaxa		
2000–2002	América		
2002–2003	San Luis		

International career
1987–1997	Mexico	16	(0)
- * Club domestic league appearances and goals

Hugo Pineda (born 10 May 1962) is a Mexican former footballer. He played in 16 matches for the Mexico national football team from 1987 to 1997. He was also part of Mexico's squad for the 1997 Copa América tournament.
