= Joaquín Hernández (footballer) =

Mexican footballer (born 1971)

Personal information
- Full name: Joaquín Hernández García
- Date of birth: 1 February 1971 (age 55)
- Place of birth: Xaltocan, Tlaxcala, Mexico
- Height: 1.70 m (5 ft 7 in)
- Position: Midfielder

Senior career*
Years	Team	Apps	(Gls)
1990–1996	Club América	84	(2)
1996–1999	Puebla	90	(1)
1999–2000	Tigres UANL	7	(0)
2000–2002	CF La Piedad	71	(2)
2002–2003	Chiapas	13	(0)
2002–2003	Puebla	12	(1)
2003–2004	Dorados de Sinaloa	29	(0)

International career
1991–1992	Mexico U23		
1992–1993	Mexico	2	(0)
- * Club domestic league appearances and goals as of 19-07-10

Joaquín Hernández García (born 1 February 1971) is a Mexican former footballer who played as a midfielder.

== Career ==
Hernández played as a midfielder during his career, and was a member of the Mexico national football team that competed at the 1992 Summer Olympics in Barcelona, Spain. He earned two caps for the national A-side, making his debut on October 22, 1992, in a friendly match against Croatia.

=== International appearances ===
International appearances
#	Date	Venue	Opponent	Result	Competition
1.	22 October 1992	Zagreb, Maksimir Stadion, Croatia	Croatia	0–3	Friendly
2.	22 September 1993	Memorial Coliseum, Los Angeles, United States	Cameroon	1–0	Friendly
