= Ángel Maldonado (footballer) =

Mexican footballer (born 1973)

Personal information
- Full name: Ángel Francisco Maldonado Gastélum
- Date of birth: September 8, 1973 (age 53)
- Place of birth: Los Mochis, Sinaloa, Mexico
- Height: 1.78 m (5 ft 10 in)
- Position: Goalkeeper

Team information
- Current team: Necaxa (Goalkeeping coach)

International career
Years	Team	Apps	(Gls)
1992	Mexico U23	3	(0)

Managerial career
- 2005: San Luis (Assistant)
- 2007: Monarcas Morelia (Assistant)
- 2014–2016: Tiburones Rojos de Veracruz (Goalkeeping coach)
- 2017–2018: Atlas (Assistant)
- 2019: Correcaminos UAT (Assistant)
- 2020–: Necaxa (Goalkeeping coach)

Ángel Francisco Maldonado (born September 8, 1973) is a Mexican former professional footballer. He played as a goalkeeper during his career. He was a member of the Mexico national team competing at the 1992 Summer Olympics in Barcelona, Spain.
