= Héctor Islas =

Mexican footballer and manager (born 1967)

Personal information
- Full name: Héctor Islas Mendoza
- Date of birth: 8 September 1967 (age 59)
- Place of birth: Mexico City, Mexico
- Height: 1.74 m (5 ft 9 in)
- Position: Midfielder

Senior career*
Years	Team	Apps	(Gls)
1983–1985	América	3	(0)
1986–1992	Cobras de Ciudad Juárez	22	(0)
1992–1996	Cruz Azul	112	(4)
1996–1998	Monarcas Morelia	54	(0)
Total		191	(4)

Managerial career
- 2004–2005: Puebla (assistant)
- 2005–2006: Jaguares (assistant)
- 2007: América (assistant)
- 2008–2009: Monarcas Morelia (assistant)
- 2009: Jaguares (assistant)
- 2010: Jaguares U20
- 2011: América (assistant)
- 2012–2013: Neza (assistant)
- 2013–2014: Monarcas Morelia (assistant)
- 2014: Guadalajara (assistant)
- 2015: Dorados Sinaloa (assistant)
- 2016: Atlético San Luis (assistant)
- 2016: Cafetaleros (assistant)
- 2017: América U20
- 2018: Querétaro (assistant)
- 2019–2020: Melgar (assistant)
- 2021–2022: Alianza Lima (assistant)
- 2023–2024: Blooming (assistant)
- 2025: Barcelona SC (assistant)
- * Club domestic league appearances and goals

Héctor Islas Mendoza (born 8 September 1967) is a Mexican football manager and former player who played as a midfielder. He was most recently the assistant manager of Querétaro.
