= Gerardo Silva (Mexican footballer) =

Mexican footballer and manager (born 1965)

Personal information
- Full name: Gerardo Silva Escudero
- Date of birth: 21 September 1965 (age 61)
- Place of birth: San Luis Potosí, San Luis Potosí, Mexico
- Position: Midfielder

Team information
- Current team: Atlético San Luis U-15 (Assistant)

Senior career*
Years	Team	Apps	(Gls)
1986–1989	Atlético Potosino	97	(2)
1989–1990	Santos Laguna	33	(2)
1990–1992	Guadalajara	72	(7)
1993–1994	América	7	(0)
1994–1995	Tampico Madero	32	(2)
1995–1996	Puebla	32	(2)

Managerial career
- 2006–2007: UAT (Assistant)
- 2007–2008: Jaguares de Chiapas (Assistant)
- 2008: León
- 2008: Lobos de San Luis
- 2013: San Luis
- 2013–2015: Chiapas Reserves and Academy
- 2022–2023: Atlético San Luis Reserves and Academy
- 2025–: Atlético San Luis Reserves and Academy
- * Club domestic league appearances and goals

Gerardo Silva Escudero (born September 21, 1965) is a Mexican football manager and former player. He played for Tampico Madero in the 1994-95 season.
