= Rafael Bautista =

Mexican footballer and manager (born 1965)

Personal information
- Full name: Rafael Bautista Arenas
- Date of birth: October 7, 1965 (age 61)
- Place of birth: Mexico City, Mexico

Senior career*
Years	Team	Apps	(Gls)
- Monarcas Morelia
- Atlético Celaya

Managerial career
- Municipal Pérez Zeledón
- Puntarenas F.C.
- * Club domestic league appearances and goals

Rafael Bautista Arenas (born October 7, 1965) is a Mexican football manager and former player. He played for Monarcas Morelia and Atlético Celaya.

After he retired from playing football, Bautista became a coach. He managed A.D. Municipal Pérez Zeledón and Puntarenas F.C. in Costa Rica.
