= José Alberto Guadarrama =

Mexican footballer (born 1972)

José Guadarrama
Personal information
- Full name: José Alberto Guadarrama Montecillo
- Date of birth: 8 May 1972 (age 54)
- Place of birth: Mexico City, Mexico
- Height: 1.84 m (6 ft 0 in)
- Position: Goalkeeper

Senior career*
Years	Team	Apps	(Gls)
1990–1995	Cruz Azul		
1995–1996	Necaxa		
1996–1997	Correcaminos		
1997–1998	Necaxa		
1998–1999	León		
1999–2000	Necaxa		
2002–2004	Inter Riviera Maya		
2004–2005	San Luis		

International career
1990–1992	Mexico U23	20	(0)
- * Club domestic league appearances and goals as of 19-07-10

José Alberto Guadarrama (born 8 May 1972) is a Mexican former professional footballer. He played as a goalkeeper during his career. He was a member of the Mexico national football team competing at the 1992 Summer Olympics in Barcelona, Spain. He was part of Necaxa's squad that finished third in the 2000 FIFA Club World Championship.
