= José Agustín Morales =

Mexican footballer (born 1971)

Personal information
- Full name: José Agustín Morales Mota
- Date of birth: 13 January 1971 (age 55)
- Place of birth: Querétaro City, Mexico
- Position: Midfielder

Senior career*
Years	Team	Apps	(Gls)
1991–1998	Cruz Azul		
1998–1999	Santos Laguna		
1999–2002	Atlético Celaya		
2002	Jaguares de Chiapas		

International career
- Mexico
- * Club domestic league appearances and goals

José Agustín Morales Mota (born 13 January 1971) is a Mexican former footballer who played as a midfielder. He competed in the men's tournament at the 1992 Summer Olympics.
