= José Enrique García =

Uruguayan footballer and manager (born 1967)

José Enrique García Duarte (born December 23, 1967, in Salto, Uruguay) is a Uruguayan football manager and former player. He earned three caps for the Uruguay national team.
