= Octavio Mora =

Mexican footballer (born 1965)

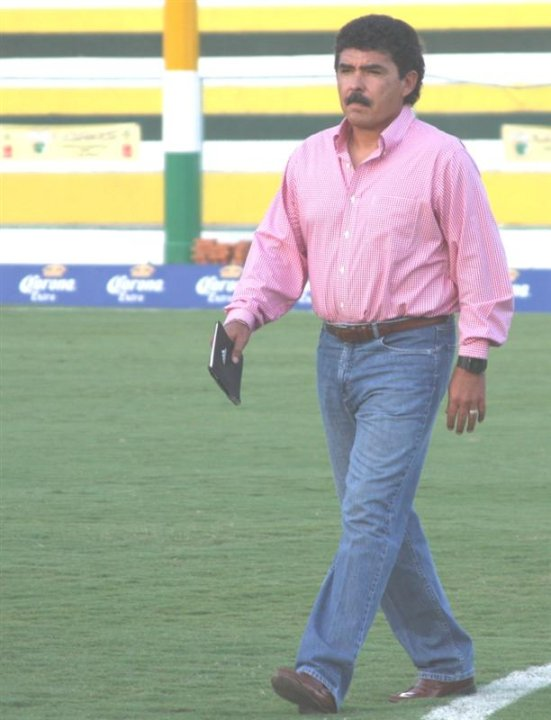

Personal information
- Full name: Jesús Octavio Mora Llamas
- Date of birth: 28 November 1965 (age 60)
- Place of birth: Guadalajara, Mexico
- Position: Striker

Senior career*
Years	Team	Apps	(Gls)
1983–1993	Universidad de Guadalajara	183	(60)
1993–1996	Cruz Azul	75	(24)
1996–1998	Monterrey	25	(1)
Total		283	(85)

International career
1988–1995	Mexico	13	(7)

Managerial career
- 2003: Querétaro
- * Club domestic league appearances and goals

Octavio Mora (born 28 November 1965) is a Mexican former footballer who played at both professional and international levels as a striker.

== Career ==
Born in Guadalajara, Mora played professionally for Universidad de Guadalajara, Cruz Azul and Monterrey.

He also represented Mexico at international level, earning a total of 13 caps.

After he retired from playing, Mora became a football coach. He managed Querétaro F.C. during 2003.

== Personal ==
Mora's son, Jorge, is also a professional footballer.
