= Rubén Omar Romano =

Argentine footballer and manager

Personal information
- Full name: Rubén Omar Romano Cachía
- Date of birth: 18 May 1958 (age 68)
- Place of birth: Buenos Aires, Argentina
- Position: Midfielder

Senior career*
Years	Team	Apps	(Gls)
1977–1978	Huracán	58	(5)
1979–1981	América	26	(3)
1981	Los Angeles Aztecs		
1981–1983	León	73	(24)
1983–1984	Necaxa	37	(11)
1984–1985	Puebla	32	(9)
1985–1986	San Lorenzo		
1986–1987	Necaxa	38	(7)
1988–1990	Atlante	39	(4)
1990–1991	Querétaro	38	(9)
1991–1992	Atlante	37	(11)
1992–1993	Cruz Azul	24	(8)
1993–1994	Veracruz	34	(4)
1994–1995	Atlante	30	(12)

Managerial career
- 1996: América (Assistant)
- 1997–1998: Atlas (Assistant)
- 1998–2000: Celaya
- 2000–2002: Tecos
- 2002–2004: Morelia
- 2004: Pachuca
- 2005: Cruz Azul
- 2006–2007: Atlas
- 2008: América
- 2010–2011: Santos Laguna
- 2011: Atlas
- 2012–2013: Morelia
- 2013–2014: Puebla
- 2015: Tijuana
- 2018: Atlas
- 2023: Mazatlán
- * Club domestic league appearances and goals

Rubén Omar Romano Cachía (born May 18, 1958, in Buenos Aires) is an Argentine former footballer and current manager.

== Footballer career ==
Romano played in Argentina for Club Atlético Huracán before leaving for Mexico in 1980 to play for Club América. He played in seven other Mexican clubs: León, Necaxa, Puebla, Querétaro, Cruz Azul, Atlante, and Veracruz. He was a left footed player with a great talent for free kicks as well as an extraordinary playmaker. His best times were in León and Atlante.

He retired as a player at Atlante after the 1994–1995 season and scored 2 goals in his last game (Atlante 6-6 Puebla). In total, Romano scored 102 goals in the Mexican Football League. He is listed among the 100 best scorers of all time in Mexico.

== Head coach ==
The same year he became the assistant coach for Ricardo La Volpe of Club Atlas.

He also worked as a coach for Celaya, Tecos, Morelia, Pachuca, and Cruz Azul. With Pachuca, he qualified for the Copa Libertadores.

Cruz Azul qualified for the Mexican playoffs in Romano's first season with the team, but lost to rivals América. Romano has qualified for the playoffs on six occasions for different teams.

Romano was kidnapped on July 19, 2005, near Xochimilco, in Mexico City by Omar Sandoval Orihuela. He was rescued on the night of September 21 of 2005, 65 days after the kidnapping, by agents of the Federal Investigation Agency. Replacing him in the interim was Isaac Mizrahi Smeke, who coached the first few weeks of Cruz Azul's season. Romano returned to work a few days after his release, while Orihuela received twenty-six years imprisonment for the kidnapping. He was relieved of his duties with the club on December 9, 2005, after coaching for eleven matches during which time Cruz Azul won two, drew three and lost five. Mizrahi was then named permanent head coach of the club.

Afterwards, Romano was hired by Atlas. He ended the regular season in last place as he didn't win the last 11 matches.

He was named head coach of Club América on February 18, 2008, due to president Guillermo Cañedo White's dismissal of Daniel Alberto Brailovsky after a run of disappointing results. On April 30, 2008, Romano finally announced his resignation from the team right after a 4–2 loss to Flamengo in the Copa Libertadores. Club América won the next three matches, including a 0–3 against Flamengo in the Maracanã Stadium. He was presented as the head coach of Santos Laguna on December 5, 2009. With the Santos Laguna, on his first tournament he got the team to the final, and on the second tournament he had the Santos on the first place on the table and of goals. He ceased to coach Santos Laguna on February 20, 2011, after losing several home games and making obscene gestures at the fans.

On August 14, 2013, Rubén Omar Romano replaced Manuel Lapuente at Puebla. He was reported on September 19, 2016, to have accepted the managerial position for a struggling CF America nearing their centenary anniversary. Club America officials later retracted the offer due to fan backlash.

== See also ==
- List of kidnappings

== Managerial statistics ==
As of 31 May 2016

Team	Nat	From	To	Record							
Team	Nat	From	To	G	W	D	L	GF	GA	GD	Win %
Tijuana	(Mexico)	2015	2015	19	8	2	9	28	33	−5	42.11
Total				19	8	2	9	28	33	−5	42.11
