= 1996–97 Copa México =

Tournament details
- Country: Mexico
- Teams: 33

Final positions
- Champions: Cruz Azul (2nd title)
- Runners-up: Toros Neza

The 1996–97 Copa México was the 67th staging of the Copa México Afootball tournament and the 40th staging in the professional era. The competition did not return until 2012.

The competition started on June 28, 1996, and concluded on August 3, 1996, with the final, in which Cruz Azul lifted the trophy for second time, with a 2-0 victory over Toros Neza.

For this edition was played by 33 teams, between Primera División and Primera División A, where the group winners advance to the semi-finals. In the qualifying round, a penalty shootout follows if the game is a tie after regulation time. the group stage was a 1-game serie.

== Group stage ==
=== Group 1 ===
Teams from Primera División: Atlante F.C., Celaya, Morelia, Toros Neza, Pachuca and Toluca
Teams from Primera División A: Cruz Azul Hidalgo, Irapuato and San Luis

Pos	Team	Pld	W	PKW	PKL	L	GF	GA	GD	Pts	Qualification
1	Toros Neza	8	6	0	0	2	17	8	+9	18	Advanced to the next phase
2	San Luis	8	5	0	0	3	14	11	+3	15	
3	Irapuato	8	4	0	2	2	11	7	+4	12	
4	Pachuca	8	4	0	1	3	13	10	+3	12	
5	Atlante F.C.	8	4	0	0	4	11	12	−1	12	
6	Morelia	8	3	1	0	4	10	12	−2	12	
7	Cruz Azul Hidalgo	8	3	1	1	3	9	13	−4	12	
8	Toluca	8	1	2	0	5	9	13	−4	9	
9	Celaya	8	1	1	1	5	7	15	−8	6	

=== Group 2 ===
Teams from Primera División: Atlas, Guadalajara, León and Tecos UAG
Teams from Primera División A: Hermosillo, La Piedad, San Francisco and Tijuana

Pos	Team	Pld	W	PKW	PKL	L	GF	GA	GD	Pts	Qualification
1	Guadalajara	7	6	0	0	1	25	6	+19	18	Advanced to the next phase
2	León	7	4	1	0	2	13	10	+3	15	
3	Atlas	7	4	0	0	3	14	12	+2	12	
4	La Piedad	7	2	2	2	1	10	11	−1	12	
5	Tecos UAG	7	3	1	0	3	13	17	−4	12	
6	Tijuana	7	3	0	0	4	7	10	−3	9	
7	San Francisco	7	2	0	1	4	8	12	−4	6	
8	Hermosillo	7	0	1	0	6	7	19	−12	3	

=== Group 3 ===
Teams from Primera División: Club América, Monterrey and Santos Laguna
Teams from Primera División A: Saltillo, Tampico Madero, Tigres UANL, Correcaminos UAT and U. de N.L.

Pos	Team	Pld	W	PKW	PKL	L	GF	GA	GD	Pts	Qualification
1	Tigres UANL	7	4	2	0	1	11	8	+3	18	Advanced to the next phase
2	Club América	7	4	1	1	1	16	12	+4	15	
3	Tampico Madero	7	3	2	0	2	16	13	+3	15	
4	Tigrillos U. de N.L.	7	2	2	0	3	7	10	−3	12	
5	Saltillo	7	3	0	0	4	7	8	−1	9	
6	Santos Laguna	7	1	1	3	2	9	9	0	6	
7	Monterrey	7	1	1	2	3	12	16	−4	6	
8	Correcaminos UAT	7	1	0	3	3	9	11	−2	3	

=== Group 4 ===
Teams from Primera División: Cruz Azul, Necaxa, Puebla, Pumas UNAM and Veracruz
Teams from Primera División A: Acapulco, Marte and Zacatepec

Pos	Team	Pld	W	PKW	PKL	L	GF	GA	GD	Pts	Qualification
1	Cruz Azul	7	5	1	0	1	20	8	+12	18	Advanced to the next phase
2	Pumas UNAM	7	3	2	1	1	12	8	+4	15	
3	Necaxa	7	4	1	0	2	13	11	+2	15	
4	Puebla	7	3	1	2	1	9	5	+4	12	
5	Zacatepec	7	2	1	0	4	14	14	0	9	
6	Veracruz	7	2	0	2	3	7	8	−1	6	
7	Marte	7	2	0	1	4	9	15	−6	6	
8	Acapulco	7	1	0	0	6	3	18	−15	3	

== Championship round ==
Semifinals; 31 July 1996
Guadalajara	0
Toros Neza	2
Tigres UANL	1(3)
Cruz Azul (p)	1(4)

Final; 3 August 1996
Toros Neza	0
Cruz Azul	2

== Final ==
3 August 1996

Toros Neza	0 – 2	Cruz Azul
		Luis Carlos de Oliveira; Carlos Hermosillo

Estadio 10 de Diciembre, Cd. Cooperativa Cruz Azul

Copa México 1996–97 Winners

2nd title
