= Carlos Hermosillo =

Mexican footballer (born 1963)

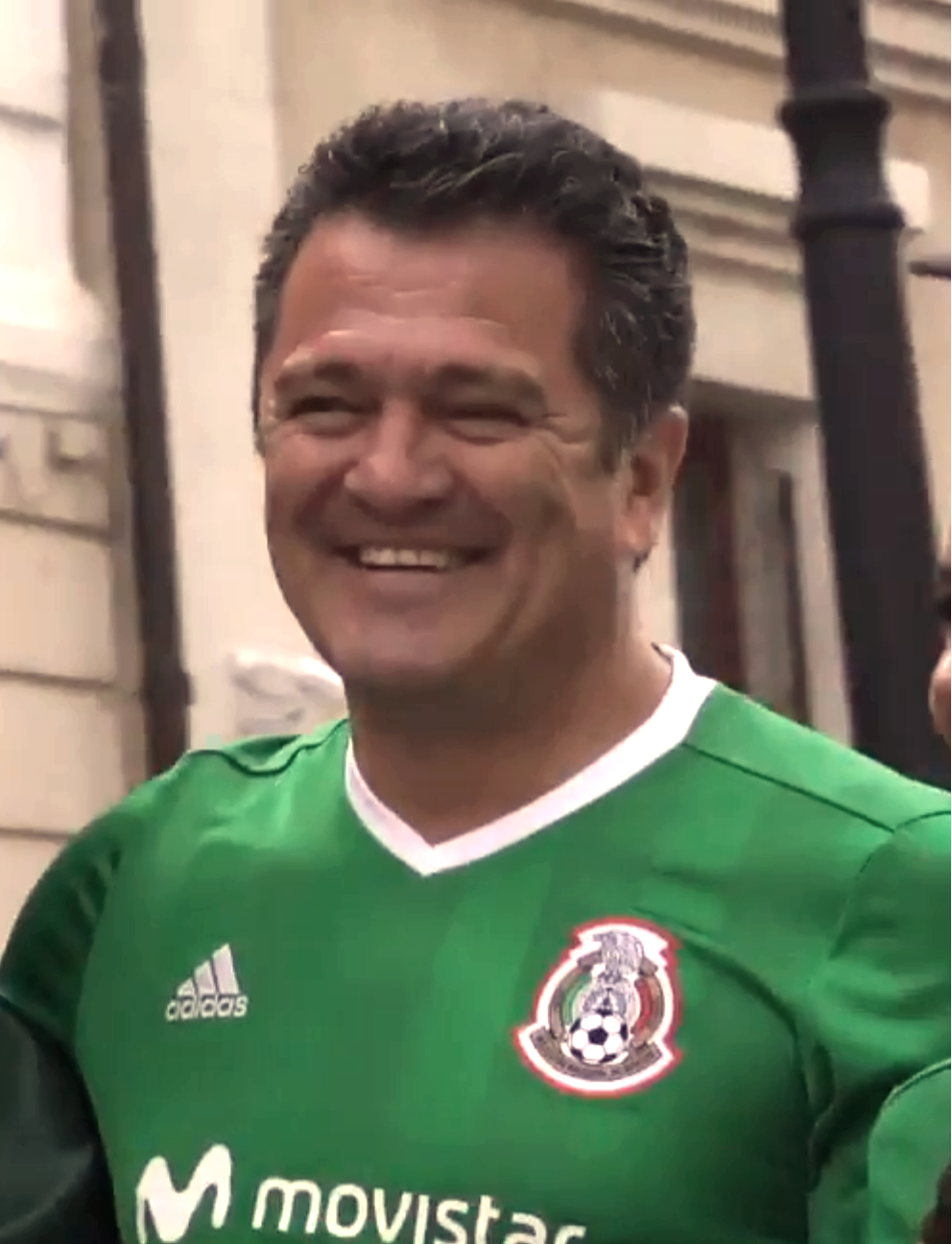
- Hermosillo in 2017

Personal information
- Full name: Carlos Manuel Hermosillo Goytortúa
- Date of birth: 11 July 1963 (age 63)
- Place of birth: Cerro Azul, Veracruz, Mexico
- Height: 6 ft 2 in (1.88 m)
- Position: Forward

Senior career*
Years	Team	Apps	(Gls)
1983–1989	América	162	(73)
1990	Standard Liège	5	(1)
1990–1991	Monterrey	35	(20)
1991–1998	Cruz Azul	215	(169)
1998–1999	Necaxa	20	(13)
1999	LA Galaxy	34	(14)
2000	América	16	(5)
2000	Atlante	16	(7)
2001	Guadalajara	34	(7)
Total		537	(309)

International career
1984–1997	Mexico	90	(35)
- * Club domestic league appearances and goals

Carlos Manuel Hermosillo Goytortúa (born 11 July 1963) is a Mexican former professional footballer who played as a forward. He is also known as El Grandote de Cerro Azul ("The big tall one from Cerro Azul").

Over an 18-year professional career, Hermosillo won seven Primera División titles, and topped the league in scoring for three consecutive seasons. His legacy is closely tied to two clubs: Club América, where he made his professional debut, and Cruz Azul, where he remains the all-time leading scorer. He stands as the second-highest goalscorer in the history of Mexico's top division, trailing only Cabinho.

On the international stage, Hermosillo retired as Mexico’s all-time leading scorer with 35 goals. He represented his country at two FIFA World Cups, in 1986 and 1994.

== Career ==
Hermosillo started his club career with América during the 1983–84 season. He spent most of his club career in his native Mexico, also playing for Monterrey, Cruz Azul, Necaxa, Atlante, and Chivas. Carlos' best two seasons as a player were in 1994–95 and 1995–96, when he scored 35 and 36 goals respectively for Cruz Azul.

Hermosillo made two stints of career football outside Mexico: Belgium's Standard Liège in 1989–90 and Major League Soccer's Los Angeles Galaxy in 1998–99. For Galaxy, he scored 14 goals and 15 assists in two regular seasons, adding five goals and an assist in the playoffs.

On 17 August 1986, he sparked an all-out war with Guadalajara's Fernando Quirarte that included others from either side; he was suspended for 12 games.

Hermosillo was once the all-time goalscoring leader for the national team with 34 goals in official matches and 35 goals in all matches (90 caps between 1984 and 1997). He played in the 1994 FIFA World Cup, in which he could not use his favoured no. 27 jersey due to FIFA's numbering rules for official competitions.

Since 1 December 2006, Carlos Hermosillo was named the minister of Mexico national sporting policy, Comisión Nacional del Deporte (National Commission for Sports). President Felipe Calderón included him in cabinet-level matters.

With an 18-year career with eight different clubs, Hermosillo retired. He last played with Guadalajara in 2001. He had a retirement game playing with Cruz Azul, his favorite team before professional play was Cruz Azul, also he won a championship with Cruz Azul in 1997.

== Career statistics ==
Scores and results list Mexico's goal tally first, score column indicates score after each Hermosillo goal.

List of international goals scored by Carlos Hermosillo
No.	Date	Venue	Opponent	Score	Result	Competition
1	26 February 1985	Unidad Deportiva Acapulco, Acapulco, Mexico	Finland	1–0	2–1	Friendly
2	22 September 1985	Spartan Stadium, San Jose, United States	Peru	1–0	1– 0	Friendly
3	10 December 1985	Estadio Jalisco, Guadalajara, Mexico	South Korea	2–1	2–1	1985 Mexico Cup
4	14 December 1985	Estadio Nemesio Díez, Toluca, Mexico	Hungary	1–0	2–0	1985 Mexico Cup
5	6 October 1987	Estadio Nemesio Díez, Toluca, Mexico	Canada	4–0	4–0	Friendly
6	2 December 1987	Santa Ana Stadium, Santa Ana, United States	Guyana	9–0	9–0	Friendly
7	21 February 1989	Los Angeles Memorial Coliseum, Los Angeles, United States	Guatemala	2–0	2–1	Friendship Cup
8	28 June 1991	Los Angeles Memorial Coliseum, Los Angeles, United States	Jamaica	4–1	4–1	1991 CONCACAF Gold Cup
9	30 June 1991	Los Angeles Memorial Coliseum, Los Angeles, United States	Canada	1–0	3–1	1991 CONCACAF Gold Cup
10	3 July 1991	Los Angeles Memorial Coliseum, Los Angeles, United States	Honduras	1–1	1–1	1991 CONCACAF Gold Cup
11	7 October 1992	Los Angeles Memorial Coliseum, Los Angeles, United States	El Salvador	2–0	2–0	Friendly
12	14 October 1992	Rudolf-Harbig-Stadion, Dresden, Germany	Germany	1–1	1–1	Friendly
13	6 December 1992	Estadio Azulgrana, Mexico City, Mexico	Saint Vincent and the Grenadines	2–0	11–0	1994 FIFA World Cup qualification
14	6 December 1992	Estadio Azulgrana, Mexico City, Mexico	Saint Vincent and the Grenadines	5–0	11–0	1994 FIFA World Cup qualification
15	6 December 1992	Estadio Azulgrana, Mexico City, Mexico	Saint Vincent and the Grenadines	8–0	11–0	1994 FIFA World Cup qualification
16	6 December 1992	Estadio Azulgrana, Mexico City, Mexico	Saint Vincent and the Grenadines	9–0	11–0	1994 FIFA World Cup qualification
17	3 November 1993	Jack Murphy Stadium, San Diego, United States	China	3–0	3–0	Friendly
18	19 January 1994	Jack Murphy Stadium, San Diego, United States	Bulgaria	1–0	1–1	Friendly
19	11 June 1994	Orange Bowl, Miami, United States	Northern Ireland	3–0	3–0	Friendly
20	14 December 1994	Estadio Azteca, Mexico City, Mexico	Hungary	1–1	5–1	Friendly
21	14 December 1994	Estadio Azteca, Mexico City, Mexico	Hungary	2–1	5–1	Friendly
22	16 October 1996	Estadio Azteca, Mexico City, Mexico	Jamaica	2–0	2–1	1998 FIFA World Cup qualification
23	30 October 1996	Estadio Azteca, Mexico City, Mexico	Saint Vincent and the Grenadines	4–0	5–1	1998 FIFA World Cup qualification
24	6 November 1996	Estadio Azteca, Mexico City, Mexico	Honduras	2–0	3–1	1998 FIFA World Cup qualification
25	20 November 1996	Los Angeles Memorial Coliseum, Los Angeles, United States	El Salvador	1–0	3–1	Friendly
26	17 January 1997	Jack Murphy Stadium, San Diego, United States	Denmark	3–1	3–1	1997 U.S. Cup
27	19 February 1997	Bulldog Stadium, Fresno, United States	Guatemala	1–0	1–1	Friendly
28	2 March 1997	Estadio Azteca, Mexico City, Mexico	Canada	1–0	4–0	1998 FIFA World Cup qualification
29	2 March 1997	Estadio Azteca, Mexico City, Mexico	Canada	3–0	4–0	1998 FIFA World Cup qualification
30	13 April 1997	Estadio Azteca, Mexico City, Mexico	Jamaica	2–0	6–0	1998 FIFA World Cup qualification
31	13 April 1997	Estadio Azteca, Mexico City, Mexico	Jamaica	3–0	6–0	1998 FIFA World Cup qualification
32	13 April 1997	Estadio Azteca, Mexico City, Mexico	Jamaica	4–0	6–0	1998 FIFA World Cup qualification
33	20 April 1997	Foxboro Stadium, Foxborough, United States	United States	1–0	2–2	1998 FIFA World Cup qualification
34	12 October 1997	Commonwealth Stadium, Edmonton, Canada	Canada	2–2	2–2	1998 FIFA World Cup qualification
35	9 November 1997	Estadio Azteca, Mexico City, Mexico	Costa Rica	3–1	3–3	1998 FIFA World Cup qualification

== Honours ==
América

- Mexican Primera División: 1983–84, 1984–85, Prode-85, 1987–88, 1988–89
- Campeón de Campeones: 1988, 1989
- CONCACAF Champions' Cup: 1987

Cruz Azul

- Mexican Primera División: Invierno 1997
- Copa México: 1996–97
- CONCACAF Champions' Cup: 1996, 1997

Los Angeles Galaxy

- Supporters' Shield: 1998
- Western Conference Regular Season: 1998

Necaxa

- Mexican Primera División: Invierno 1998

Individual

- Mexican Primera División Golden Ball: 1994–95
- Mexican Primera División Golden Boot: 1993–94, 1994–95, 1995–96
- Mexican Primera División Best Forward: 1994–95, 1995–96
- CONCACAF Champions' Cup Golden Boot: 1996, 1997
- Copa México Golden Boot: 1995–96, 1996–97
- MLS All-Star: 1999

Records

- Cruz Azul All Time Top Scorer: 198 goals
