= FC Juárez =

Association football club in Mexico

Juárez
- Full name: Fútbol Club Juárez
- Nicknames: Los Bravos (The Braves); Los Verdinegros (The Green and Blacks)
- Short name: JUA, FCJ
- Founded: 29 May 2015; 11 years ago
- Stadium: Estadio Olímpico Benito Juárez
- Capacity: 19,703
- Owner: MountainStar Sports Group
- President: Vacant
- Manager: Gustavo Lema
- League: Liga MX
- Apertura 2026: Regular phase: 18th of 18; Final phase: Not qualified
- Website: fcjuarez.com
Home colours	Away colours

Fútbol Club Juárez, also known as Bravos de Juárez, is a professional football club based in Ciudad Juárez, Chihuahua. The club competes in Liga MX, the highest level of Mexican football, and plays its home matches at Estadio Olímpico Benito Juárez. Founded in 2015, debuting in Ascenso MX, and winning the Apertura 2015 in their first season. On June 2019, the club acquired the Lobos BUAP franchise and took its place in Liga MX.

In domestic competitions, FC Juárez finished as runners-up in the Clausura 2019 Copa MX. The club's best result in Liga MX has been reaching the quarter-finals in the Apertura 2025 tournament. The club also holds the Liga MX record for the longest losing streak at the start of a season with eight losses in the Apertura 2026 tournament.

== History ==
=== Early years ===
FC Juárez is a professional football club in Ciudad Juárez, Chihuahua, Mexico. It was founded on May 2015 by a group of businesspeople, among them Alejandra de la Vega, who holds the majority ownership stake in the club. The club was established to restore professional football to Ciudad Juárez following the dissolution of the Cobras de Ciudad Juárez in 2005 and the Indios de Ciudad Juárez in 2011. The Indios had folded due to financial difficulties and the climate of insecurity that had affected the city. The club's founders identified the need for a recreational and sporting distraction for the city's residents and pursued the creation of Juárez with that purpose. Juárez's nickname, Los Bravos de Juárez, sometimes shortened to Los Bravos (loosely translated as The Braves, The Brave Ones, or The Tough Ones), derives from the Río Bravo, the international river that runs through Ciudad Juárez and forms the Mexico–United States border. The nickname was formalized in July 2015 following a public poll conducted on the club's website and at physical locations in Ciudad Juárez and El Paso, Texas, United States.

On 14 July 2015, Juárez made their debut in Ascenso MX, Mexico's second-tier professional league, defeating Lobos BUAP 1–0 at home in front of 16,000 spectators in their first match of the Apertura 2015 season. The Ascenso MX divided its calendar into two seasonal tournaments, the Apertura and Clausura. The club finished second in the regular season standings of the Apertura tournament with 29 points from eight wins, five draws, and two losses, advancing to the playoffs and reaching the final against Atlante in a two-leg match. Juárez lost the first leg 1–0 away before winning 3–0 at home to claim the title 3–1 on aggregate. Winning the Apertura 2015 granted Juárez a place in the Ascenso MX's promotion playoff final, contested against the Clausura 2016 season winners Necaxa for a place in the Primera División, Mexico's top-flight division. Juárez lost the first leg 1–0 away before losing 2–0 at home, failing to earn promotion on a 3–0 aggregate.

In the Clausura 2017 season, Juárez finished fourth in the regular season standings with 28 points from eight wins, four draws, and five losses, advancing to the playoffs and reaching the final against Lobos BUAP. Juárez lost the first leg 2–1 away before losing 2–1 at home, falling 4–2 on aggregate and failing to qualify for the promotion playoff against Dorados de Sinaloa, who had won the preceding Apertura 2016 season. In the Apertura 2017 season, Juárez finished second in the regular season standings with 26 points from seven wins, five draws, and three losses, advancing to the playoffs and reaching the final against Alebrijes de Oaxaca. Juárez lost the first leg 1–0 away before winning 2–1 at home, leveling the aggregate at 2–2 and forcing a penalty shootout, where they lost 2–4. The defeat meant Juárez failed to qualify for the promotion playoff, which was ultimately contested against Cafetaleros de Tapachula, the Clausura 2018 season winners. (Note: Both Alebrijes de Oaxaca and Cafetaleros de Tapachula were ineligible for promotion to the Primera División due to a rule requiring first-division stadiums to have a minimum capacity of 20,000. FC Juárez was among six Ascenso MX clubs that met the eligibility requirements for promotion.)

In 2019, Juárez participated in the Clausura 2019 Copa MX, a domestic cup tournament featuring clubs from the Primera División and Ascenso MX in a group stage and knockout format. The club went undefeated through the group stage, winning three and drawing one, before reaching the final against América in a single-leg match at their home stadium. Juárez lost 1–0, ending their run at winning their first major tournament.

=== Promotion to top division ===
On 11 June 2019, Juárez acquired Lobos BUAP for US$20 million, assuming their place in Liga MX and gaining promotion to the top division as a result. The club's inaugural season in the Primera División was the Apertura 2019, marking the return of top-level professional football to Ciudad Juárez since the Indios de Ciudad Juárez last competed in the top flight in 2010, before being relegated and subsequently dissolved. The Meritorious Autonomous University of Puebla (BUAP), which had been affiliated with Lobos BUAP, opposed the acquisition, claiming a share of the revenue from the transaction. Following a lawsuit, the university was awarded MXN$90 million (approximately US$2 million).

In the Apertura 2022 season, Juárez came close to reaching the liguilla (playoffs) for the first time, finishing 11th in the league standings and earning a place in the repechage play-in round. In a single-leg match against Toluca at Nemesio Diez Stadium, they lost 3–0 and were eliminated. In the Clausura 2025 season, Juárez again qualified for the repechage, finishing ninth in the standings, this time facing Pumas UNAM at home. After drawing 1–1 in regular time, the match was decided on penalties, with Juárez losing 1–2 and failing to advance.

The team recorded its best Liga MX performance in the Apertura 2025 season, finishing eighth in the league table. The result qualified the club for the repechage play-in round, where it defeated Pachuca 2–1 at home to secure its first-ever appearance in the liguilla. Juárez was eliminated in the quarter-finals by Toluca, the defending champions, losing 1–2 on aggregate. Juárez lost the first leg at home 1–2 and drew 0–0 in the away match. Toluca went on to win the tournament.

In the Apertura 2026, Juárez recorded eight consecutive losses to open the season, earning the league record for the longest losing streak at the start of a season. (Note: The record of seven consecutive losses at the start of a league season was shared with by Dorados de Sinaloa in the Clausura 2016 and Quéretaro in the Clausura 2019.) The club became the first in the Apertura 2026 to dismiss their manager, parting ways with Pedro Caixinha after three matches. Salvador Valero served as interim coach before Gustavo Lema was appointed, losing his first match in charge. In September 2026, Juárez's board dismissed chairman Andrés Fassi for the poor season results, ending a three-year tenure. (Note: Fassi had also served as chairman of Argentine club Talleres de Córdoba and spent the majority of his time in Argentina.) Juárez ended their losing streak in the following fixture, defeating Tigres UANL 2–0 at home. The poor start also prompted rumors that the club's owners intended to sell, which were later denied.

== Stadium ==
Juárez play their home matches at the Estadio Olímpico Benito Juárez in Ciudad Juárez, owned by the Universidad Autónoma de Ciudad Juárez (UACJ). The multi-purpose stadium features a football pitch and an Olympic athletics track, and is situated within the Chamizal Public Federal Park, a city park connecting Ciudad Juárez and El Paso, adjacent to the Chamizal National Memorial. The land was formerly a disputed boundary area between the United States and Mexico. Completed in October 1980, the stadium held its inaugural match the following year between the Mexico national team and Atlético Madrid. With a capacity of 19,703, it is the smallest stadium in Liga MX.

The stadium was built on a 38,000 m^{2} (410,000 sq ft) area, and its pitch is a grass surface measuring 105 m (344 ft) by 68 m (223 ft), maintained through two seasonal treatments annually to account for Ciudad Juárez's climate. The stadium buildings house two gyms equipped for weight training and gymnastics. Adjoining the stadium is the Collegiate Sports Unit, a training complex opened to the public in 2017 that accommodates football, futsal, track and field, volleyball, and tennis. The stadium's car park holds up to 1,500 vehicles.

== Support ==
Juárez has a supporter group named El Kartel, a barra brava formed in 2002. Although originally named in reference to the term cartel in its general sense of a group of entities collaborating, the group opted to retain the name as a darkly humorous reference to the drug cartel violence that affected Ciudad Juárez during Mexico's drug war from 2007 to 2013 and as a mockery of the local criminal organization, the Juárez Cartel. The group often displays the colors red, white, and black, previously associated with the Indios and the Cobras. Its origins and activities are documented in the book This Love Is Not for Cowards: Salvation and Soccer in Ciudad Juárez (2012) by American writer Robert Andrew Powell.

El Kartel is closely affiliated with and inspired by the supporter group of Atlético Nacional of Medellín, Colombia, drawing on their experience given the two groups share a similar philosophy and historical context around the drug violence that affected both Ciudad Juárez and Medellín. El Kartel have used the slogan Paz y Fútbol (English: Peace and Football) in fan banners. The group holds a designated section in the stadium, travels to away matches, and organizes events for supporters including social gatherings, celebrations, and matchday displays.

The club's mascot is Benny Bravo, a costumed black horse dressed in the team's jersey. The name combines Benny, a diminutive of Benito in reference to Benito Juárez, after whom Ciudad Juárez is named, and Bravo, a reference to the club's nickname, Bravos de Juárez. The name was chosen through a social media contest and was also selected for its ease of pronunciation in English for the club's English-speaking supporters. Benny Bravo has participated in various charitable events in Ciudad Juárez.

=== Rivalries ===
Juárez has an international friendly rivalry with El Paso Locomotive, a club based in El Paso and competing in the USL Championship, the second tier of the United States soccer league system. The fixture is known as the Derby Paso del Norte, a reference to the El Paso–Juárez border region, with the derby's logo featuring the Star on the Mountain landmark in El Paso and La X sculpture in Ciudad Juárez.

The two clubs first met in a friendly match in 2019 ahead of El Paso Locomotive's inaugural season, in which Juárez lost 1–3 while fielding mostly a reserve and under-20 squad at the Estadio Olímpico Benito Juárez. In 2024, the derby was played for the first time in the United States at the Southwest University Park in front of a crowd. Both clubs are owned by MountainStar Sports Group.

== Crest and colors ==
Juárez's crest, unchanged since 2015, features bright green, red, and black colors with a silhouette of a galloping horse over a green sun, placed over a shield. Prior to this design, the club used a short-lived crest featuring a football surrounded by diagonal red and dark purple radiating stripes within a circular frame, set against a column in the background.

Their kit is supplied by Joma, a Spanish sportswear manufacturer. The traditional home kit is lime green with black and red details, while the away kit is black and the third kit red. The green was chosen to symbolize the supporters' passion, the white to represent a blend of traditional and modern identity along with sporting peace and appreciation for Ciudad Juárez, and the black to symbolize the tenacity of establishing a sporting institution. The jerseys typically feature a shaded X motif as a background design, referencing the La X sculpture in Ciudad Juárez. Some editions of the jersey have also incorporated a shaded horse motif as an alternative background design. The club is also nicknamed Los Verdinegros (The Dark Greens), a reference to their kit colors. The club's main sponsor is Grupo Caliente, a Mexican sports betting company, a partnership that began in January 2025.

In 2022, Juárez launched a limited-edition commemorative jersey honoring Mexican singer Juan Gabriel, who built his musical career in Ciudad Juárez. The black jersey featured gold spots inspired by an outfit the singer wore at one of his major concerts, along with his likeness and signature.

== Management ==
=== Coaching staff ===
As of 3 October 2026

Position	Staff
Manager	(Argentina) Gustavo Lema
Assistant managers	(Argentina) Matías Lema
Assistant managers	(Argentina) Raúl Gordillo
Assistant managers	(Brazil) Leandro Carrijó
Goalkeeper coach	(Mexico) Edgar Salcedo
Fitness coach	(Argentina) Hernán Petti
Fitness coach	(Mexico) Néstor Ibarra
Assistant team doctor	(Mexico) Kevin Ponce
Team doctor	(Mexico) Álvaro Martínez
Sports intelligence assistant	(Mexico) Cosme Barba
Team delegate	(Argentina) Pablo Metlich
Sports intelligence assistant	(Mexico) Cosme Barba
Sports intelligence assistant	(Argentina) Pablo Metlich
Sports intelligence assistant	(Mexico) Rodrigo Cuello

Source: Liga MX

=== Managers ===
- (Mexico) Sergio Orduña (2015–2016)
- (Mexico) Miguel de Jesús Fuentes (2016–2018)
- (Mexico) Tomás Campos (Interim) (2018)
- (Mexico) Gabriel Caballero (2018–2020)
- (Mexico) Luis Fernando Tena (2020–2021)
- (Mexico) Alfonso Sosa (2021)
- (Brazil) Ricardo Ferretti (2021–2022)
- (Argentina) Hernan Cristante (2022–2023)
- (Mexico) Diego Mejía (2023–2024)
- (Brazil) Mauricio Barbieri (2024)
- (Spain) Salvador Valero (Interim) (2024)
- (Uruguay) Martín Varini (2024–2025)
- (Portugal) Pedro Caixinha (2025–2026)
- (Spain) Salvador Valero (Interim) (2026)
- (Argentina) Gustavo Lema (2026–present)

== Players ==
=== First-team squad ===
As of 3 October 2026

Note: Flags indicate national team as defined under FIFA eligibility rules; some limited exceptions apply. Players may hold more than one non-FIFA nationality.

No.	Pos.	Nation	Player
1	GK	MEX	Sebastián Jurado
2	DF	MEX	Gilberto Sepúlveda (on loan from Guadalajara)
3	DF	COL	Jesús Murillo
4	DF	MEX	Alejandro Mayorga
5	MF	MEX	Denzell García
6	MF	ESP	Monchu (on loan from Aris)
7	MF	MEX	Raymundo Fulgencio
8	MF	BRA	Guilherme Castilho
9	FW	BRA	Madson
10	MF	MEX	Jairo Torres
11	MF	PAN	José Luis Rodríguez
13	MF	BRA	Rodrigo Dourado (on loan from América)
14	DF	MEX	Éder López

No.	Pos.	Nation	Player
16	MF	MEX	Juan Sigala (on loan from Pachuca)
17	FW	MEX	Luca Martínez (on loan from Godoy Cruz)
19	FW	COL	Óscar Estupiñán
20	DF	MEX	Javier Aquino
21	MF	POR	Ricardinho
23	DF	MEX	Haret Ortega
24	GK	USA	Benny Díaz
25	MF	MEX	Said Godínez
26	DF	CHI	Daniel Piña
27	GK	ESP	Guillermo Ruiz
29	FW	MEX	Ettson Ayón (on loan from León)
33	DF	MEX	Francisco Nevárez
35	DF	MEX	Bryan Romero

=== Youth squad ===
Note: Flags indicate national team as defined under FIFA eligibility rules; some limited exceptions apply. Players may hold more than one non-FIFA nationality.

No.	Pos.	Nation	Player
183	MF	MEX	Leonardo Rodríguez
198	DF	MEX	Ricardo Juárez
201	MF	MEX	Jan Carlo Carmona

No.	Pos.	Nation	Player
203	DF	MEX	Luis Carmona
250	MF	MEX	Brayan Molina

=== Other players under contract ===
Note: Flags indicate national team as defined under FIFA eligibility rules; some limited exceptions apply. Players may hold more than one non-FIFA nationality.

No.	Pos.	Nation	Player
15	MF	PAR	Lucas Romero (injured)

=== Out on loan ===
Note: Flags indicate national team as defined under FIFA eligibility rules; some limited exceptions apply. Players may hold more than one non-FIFA nationality.

No.	Pos.	Nation	Player
—	MF	COL	Homer Martínez (at Deportes Tolima)
—	MF	MEX	Rodolfo Pizarro (at Pachuca)

No.	Pos.	Nation	Player
—	MF	COL	Diego Valoyes (at Talleres)
—	FW	MEX	César Sosa (at UAT)

== Honours ==
Domestic
Type	Competition	Titles	Seasons	Runners-up	Source
Top level FMF	Copa MX	0	—	Cla–2019	
Lower levels FMF	Ascenso MX	1	Ape–2015	Cla–2017, Ape–2017	
Lower levels FMF	Campeón de Ascenso	0	—	2015–16	

== Bibliography ==
- Martínez, Oscar J. (2018). Ciudad Juárez: Saga of a Legendary Border City. University of Arizona Press. ISBN 0816538190.
- Powell, Robert Andrew (2013). This Love Is Not For Cowards: Salvation and Soccer in Ciudad Juárez. Bloomsbury Publishing. ISBN 1608197182.
