= Richard Swanson (disambiguation) =

Richard Swanson may refer to:

- Richard Swanson (born 1945), American electrical engineer and businessman
- Richard A. Swanson (born 1942), American organizational theorist
- Death of Richard Swanson (1970–2013), American man who tried to dribble a soccer ball from Seattle to São Paulo
