= Ángel Custodio =

Sculpture in Puebla, Mexico

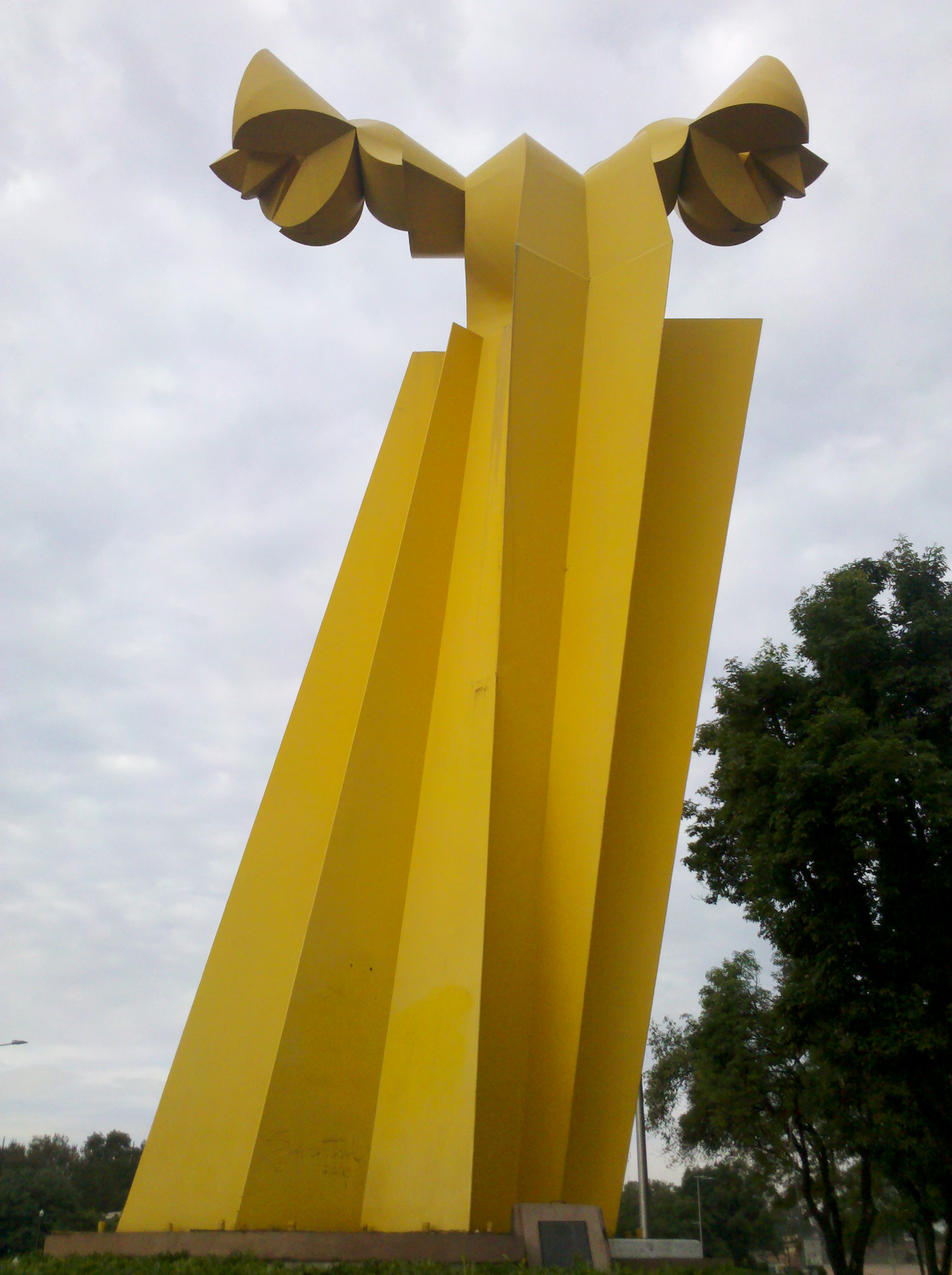
- The sculpture in 2014
- Artist: Sebastián
- Location: Puebla, Puebla, Mexico; 19°2′28″N 98°11′35.3″W

Ángel Custodio is an outdoor sculpture by Sebastián (Enrique Carbajal), installed in Puebla, in the Mexican state of Puebla. It was inaugurated on November 7, 2003, during the municipal administration of Luis Eduardo Paredes Moctezuma. The sculpture is 17 meters high and is made of iron with a yellow color that comes from acrylic enamel with bronze.

== History ==
The sculpture was made and inaugurated on November 7, 2003. The work had a cost of 3 million pesos.

In 2017, when the construction of Line 3 of the Red Urbana de Transporte Articulado was planned, it was planned to relocate the monument, along with others that were in the area, which was later discarded.

== Reviews ==
The sculptural work was widely criticized by specialists and the citizens of Puebla due to its appearance. Some people began to call it a "monument to the fallopian tubes", and others considered that it was not suitable because it did not represent the "true spirit of the city"

Artists and specialists indicated that they felt displaced for not being considered to make a sculpture of this magnitude, since there was no previous call. Others criticized the work from a religious point of view, and that the municipal government wanted to impose a religious iconography. Although the piece can be interpreted as a 'winged victory', for some it has other appearances, such as the claws of a crustacean or even a double-headed snake, as Roberto Martínez Garcilaso pointed out.

Even in a survey conducted by a website on the ugliest sculptures in Mexico, the Guardian Angel was the one with the most votes. Although on a technical or plastic level the piece has relevance, it was judged as inappropriate for the context where it was chosen, a traditional neighborhood in the city of Puebla. Until the year of inauguration of the work, Puebla did not have sculptures in public spaces of these dimensions that also used unconventional forms and materials; Although yellow is a color widely used in the area, it was part of the elements that were considered as striking or out of place.

== See also ==
- 2003 in art
