= Guerrero Chimalli =

Sculpture in the State of Mexico

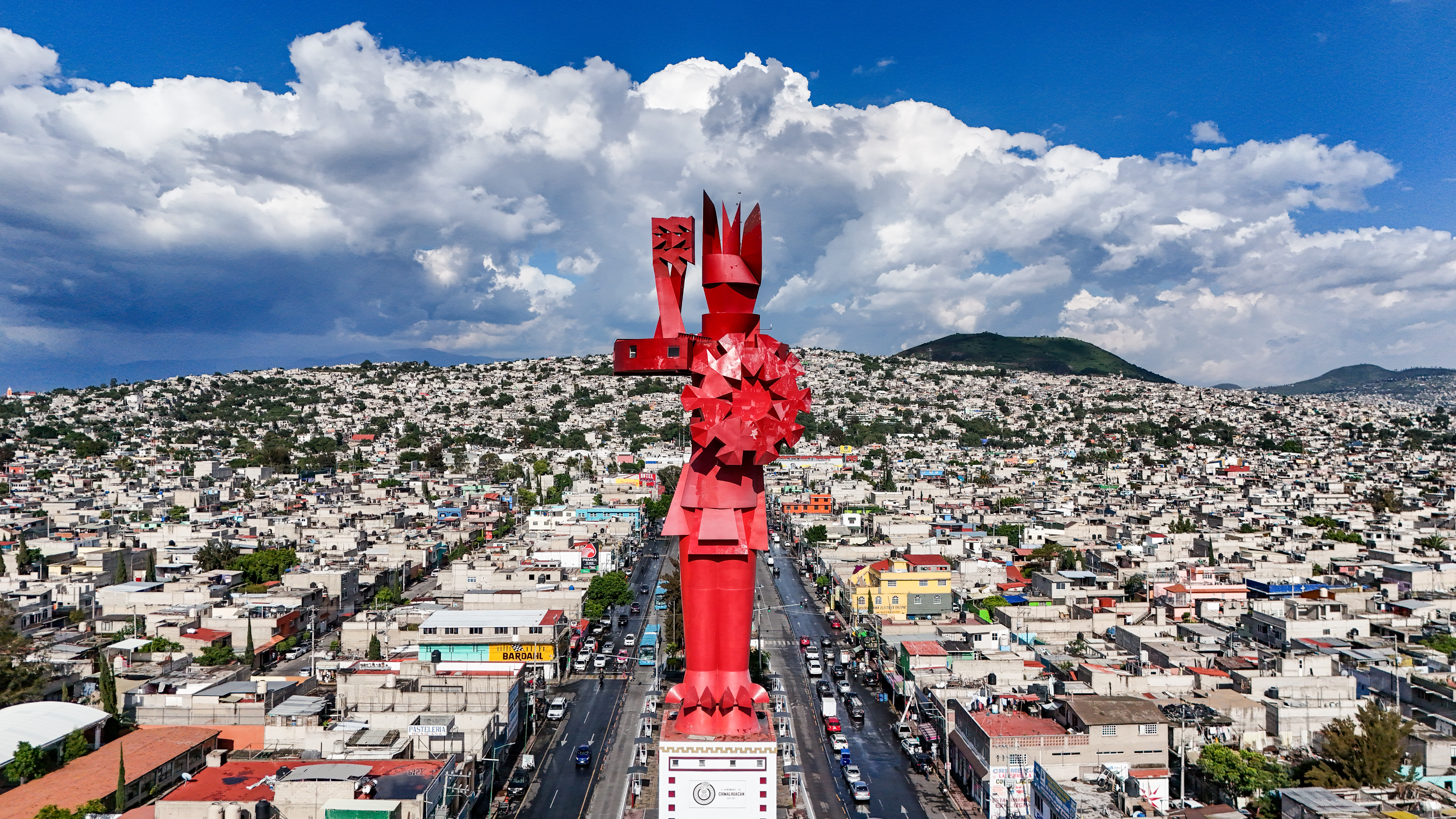
- The sculpture in 2026
- Location
- Artist: Sebastián
- Year: 2014
- Medium: Steel
- Dimensions: 60 m (200 ft)
- Weight: 870 t (860 long tons; 960 short tons)
- Location: Chimalhuacán; 19°24′47″N 98°59′02″W
- Website: experiencia.edomex.gob.mx

Guerrero Chimalli (Spanish: [ɡeˈreɾo tʃiˈmali]; "Shield Warrior") is an outdoor steel sculpture by Enrique "Sebastián" Carbajal, installed along Bordo de Xochiaca Avenue, in Chimalhuacán, State of Mexico. It is a 60-meter (197 ft) artwork that depicts an Indigenous warrior holding a Chīmalli (a type of shield) and a mace. The plinth serves as a museum and the sculpture has an observation deck. Excluding their plinths, it is slightly taller than the Statue of Liberty, in the United States.

== History and description ==
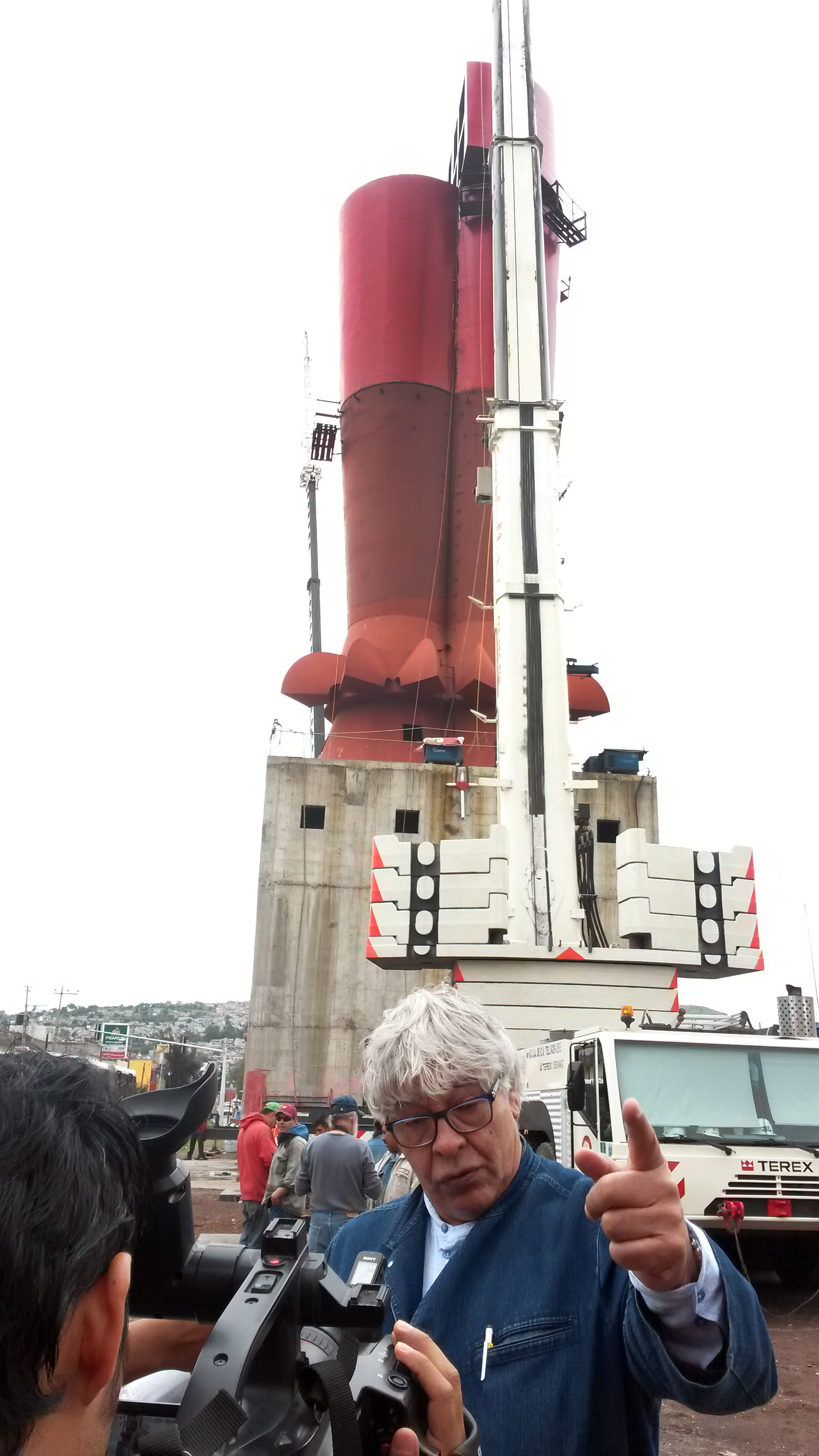
Sebastián supervising the installation in June 2014

The sculpture of Guerrero Chimalli is a 50-meter (160 ft) tall red Aztec warrior that holds a Chīmalli and a mace. It was created by Enrique "Sebastián" Carbajal. The sculpture itself weighs around 600 metric tons (590 long tons; 660 short tons), but the concrete plinth (which is 10 m [33 ft] high) and the 65 piles that support them increase the height to 60 m (200 ft) and the weight to 870 t (860 long tons; 960 short tons). Due to its height and color, the sculpture can be seen throughout Chimalhuacán and in adjacent zones.

Its construction started during the 2009–2012 municipal administration. It is composed of 33 welded steel pieces painted with red polyurethane paint. The artwork cost US$2.4 million (which would be $3 million in 2025, considering inflation). Additionally, the government remodeled the median strip where it lies; they added a fountain, bridges and trees. These additional works cost $1.4 million ($2 million in 2025).

The sculpture was inaugurated on 13 December 2014. It was dedicated to the Tenochcas that defended Tenochtitlan during the Fall of Tenochtitlan. The sculpture has an observation deck at its arm. It is 40 m (130 ft) long, 2.4 m (7 ft 10 in) high and it is connected to the base with a staircase composed of 250 steps and an elevator.

Sebastián described his work as "an exceptional, attractive and emotional colossus" whose purpose is "to promote the spirit, to understand what we are and to proceed as a society with a modern and universal mentality".

== Reception ==
Like most of Sebastián's works, Guerrero Chimalli received mixed reactions to the artist's style. It additionally received criticism due to its cost as half of the municipality's population lives in some degree of poverty. According to Sebastián, the most expensive investment were the cranes that placed each piece. It was also compared to Mazinger Z, Ultraman, Godzilla and Transformers. Gil Gamés wrote for El Financiero: "You spot it from a distance and the warrior is ugly, but if you get closer it is simply hideous". Sebastián compared the criticism the sculpture received with similar opinions the Eiffel Tower experienced when it was inaugurated.

== See also ==
- Coyote en Ayuno, another sculpture by Sebastián in the neighboring municipality of Nezahualcóyotl.
- List of tallest statues
- List of the tallest statues in Mexico
