= Ciudad Nezahualcóyotl =

City in Mexico

Nezahualcóyotl Ciudad Nezahualcóyotl
- City and municipality
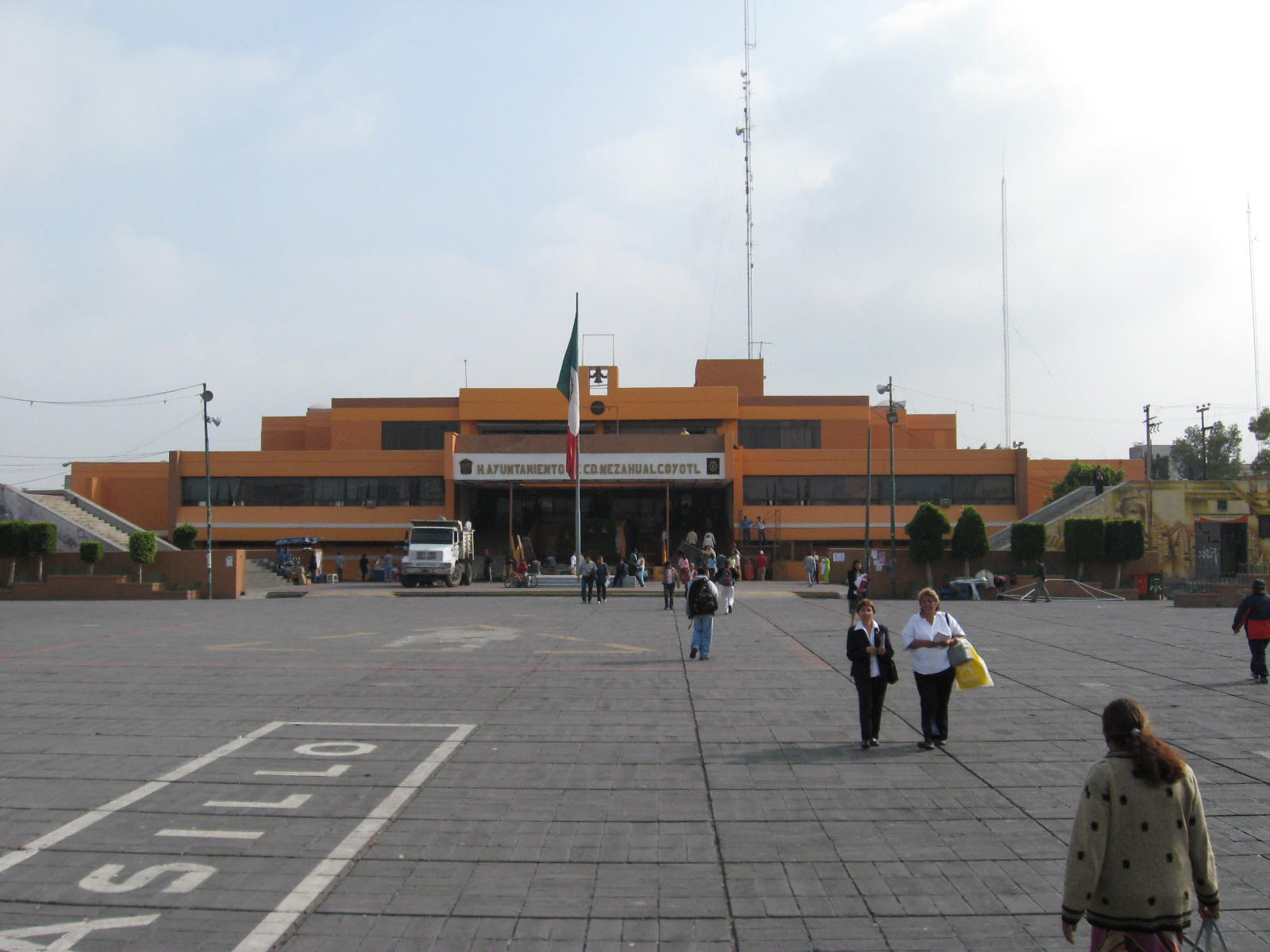
- Nezahualcóyotl city hall

- Coat of arms

- Location of the Municipality in the State of Mexico

- Location in Greater Mexico City Location in the State of Mexico Location in Mexico
- Coordinates: 19°24′29″N 99°01′07″W
- Country: Mexico
- State: State of Mexico
- Region: Nezahualcóyotl
- Municipality founded: 23 April 1963
- Named for: Nezahualcoyotl

Government
  - Type: Ayuntamiento
  - Municipal President: Adolfo Cerqueda Rebollo (2025–2027)

Area
  - Total: 63.74 km^{2} (24.61 sq mi)
  - Water: 0.62 km^{2} (0.24 sq mi)
- Elevation (of seat): 2,220 m (7,280 ft)

Population (2020 census)
  - Total: 1,077,208
  - Rank: 25th in North America; 10th in Mexico
  - Density: 17,026.4/km^{2} (44,098/sq mi)
- Time zone: UTC–06:00 (Central)
- Postal code (of seat): 57000
- Area code: 55
- Demonym: Nezahualquense
- Website: www.neza.gob.mx (in Spanish)

Ciudad Nezahualcóyotl (Spanish pronunciation: [sjuˈðað nesawalˈkoʝotl], Nahuatl for 'fasting coyote'), or more commonly Neza, is a city and municipal seat of the municipality of Nezahualcóyotl in Mexico. It is located in the state of Mexico, adjacent to the east side of Mexico City. The municipality comprises its own intrastate region, Region IX (Mexico State).

It was named after Nezahualcoyotl, the Acolhua poet and king of nearby Texcoco, which was built on the drained bed of Lake Texcoco. The name Nezahualcóyotl comes from Nahuatl, meaning "fasting coyote". Nezahualcóyotl's heraldry includes an Aztec glyph as well as a coat of arms. The glyph depicts the head of a coyote, tongue outside the mouth with a collar or necklace as a symbol of royalty (one of the ways of depicting the Aztec king). The current coat of arms, which includes the glyph, was authorized by the municipality in the 1990s.

Until the 20th century, the land on which Ciudad Neza sits was under Lake Texcoco and uninhabited. Successful draining of the lake in the early 20th century created new land, which the government eventually sold into private hands. However, public services such as adequate potable water, electricity and sewerage were lacking until after the area was made an independent municipality in 1963. Today, Ciudad Neza is a sprawling city of over one million, mostly living in slums.

As of 2006, Nezahualcóyotl includes part of the world's largest shanty town, along with Chalco and Ixtapaluca. Most of its population is poor and have migrated from other parts of Mexico. It also has a very high crime rate, in part due to cholos, gangs that formed in the 1990s based upon gangs in the United States (especially Los Angeles). Since the 2000s, a significant number of natives of this city have immigrated to the United States, mostly settling in New York. This has led to a new Mexican subculture in the area.

== History ==
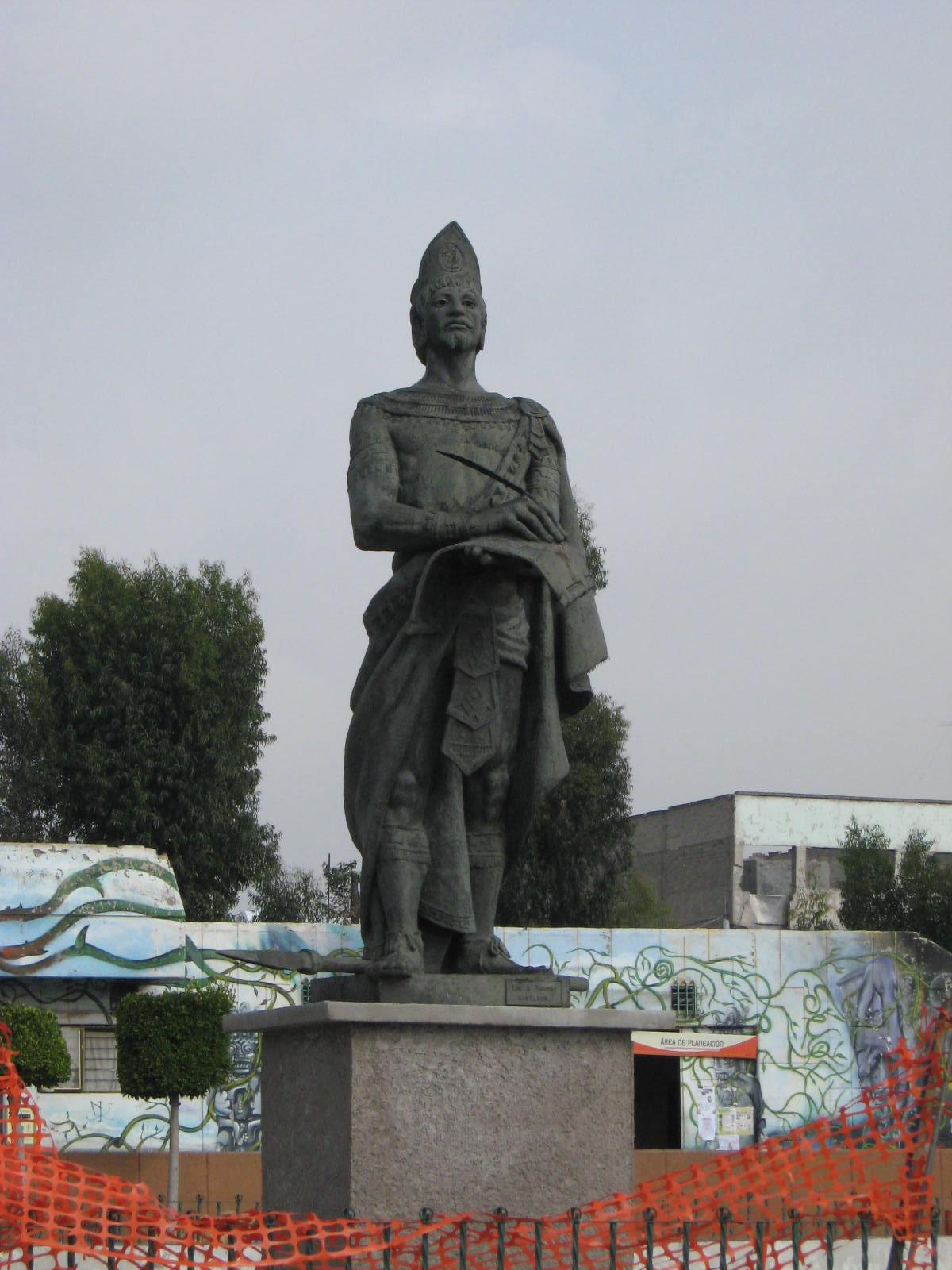
Statue of Nezahualcóyotl in the main plaza

Nezahualcoyotl, for whom the city and municipality were named, was the lord of Texcoco, one of the allies of the Aztec Triple Alliance. Texcoco dominated the area in which the modern municipality stands; however the land on which Ciudad Neza stands was under Lake Texcoco until the 20th century. Drainage of the interconnected lakes of the Valley of Mexico began in the early colonial period. The first major drainage project was begun in 1590, with the aim of eliminating the chronic flooding that plagued Mexico City. By the time of the Mexican War of Independence, flooding was still common in the Mexico City area, and at that time a project was begun to drain Lake Texcoco directly. The Lake Texcoco area was declared federal property in 1912, after which efforts to completely drain the lake commenced which continued until the 1930s. Starting in 1917 under Venustiano Carranza, efforts to determine legal ownership of lands that began to appear due to the drainage of the lake were undertaken. Most of this land was declared federal property to be sold. In 1933, the Mexico City–Puebla highway was built through this area. The first settlements in what is now the municipality were extensions of the municipalities of Chimalhuacán, La Paz and Ecatepec.

The area was known for a bird species called the chichicuilote-atziztizuilotl, which inhabited the lakes and ponds of the Valley of Mexico. Today it is nearly extinct. The center of the city had an area that specialized in the sale of the bird, both alive and cooked.

These initial settlements were without infrastructure or public services, and efforts to procure these began in the 1940s. In 1945 the Xochiaca dam and the Tequixquiac tunnel were built, the diversion of potable water allowed for the creation of the first formal neighborhoods of Juárez Pantitlán, México and El Sol. By 1949, the area had 2,000 inhabitants. In the 1950s the population of the area grew quickly as people from various parts of Mexico immigrated to the Mexico City area in search of opportunity. This grew to 40,000 by 1954, despite the lack of other services such as electricity. The area gained more formal administrative status from the state of Mexico in the 1950s as it grew, but by 1959, a group representing the now-33 neighborhoods of the area protested the lack of services, which still included sufficient potable water.

In 1960, the idea emerged to separate this area from the municipality of Chimalhuacán in order to create a new municipality. By this time, the area had a population of 80,000. This idea culminated into the creation of the municipality of Nezahualcóyotl on 3 April 1963 by the state legislature, with Jorge Sáenza Gómez Knoth as the first municipal president.

Conversion of the area into a municipality helped greatly in getting water, pavement, sewer and streetlights in the 1960s and 1970s. However, the sale of land here was legally complicated due to problems in land title. This began to be regulated in the mid-1970s and would continue through the 1980s and into part of the 1990s.

By the early 1980s, major public buildings such as hospitals, the municipal palace, schools, libraries and the Museum of Archeology had been built. The Xochiaca area had become a landfill with a sports facility built along its edge.

The city grew quickly during the 1980s with new neighborhoods, shopping centers and other urban areas built. It became necessary to have a municipal committee dedicated to the control of urban growth.

In the 1990s the Ciudad Deportiva (Sports City) and the Universidad Tecnológica de Nezahualcóyotl were established. The population surpassed one million by 1995.

The city has produced a number of athletes, such as Humberto "La Chiquita" González and Graciela Hernández, the first of many wheelchair basketball gold medalists in the Pan American Games.

== The city ==
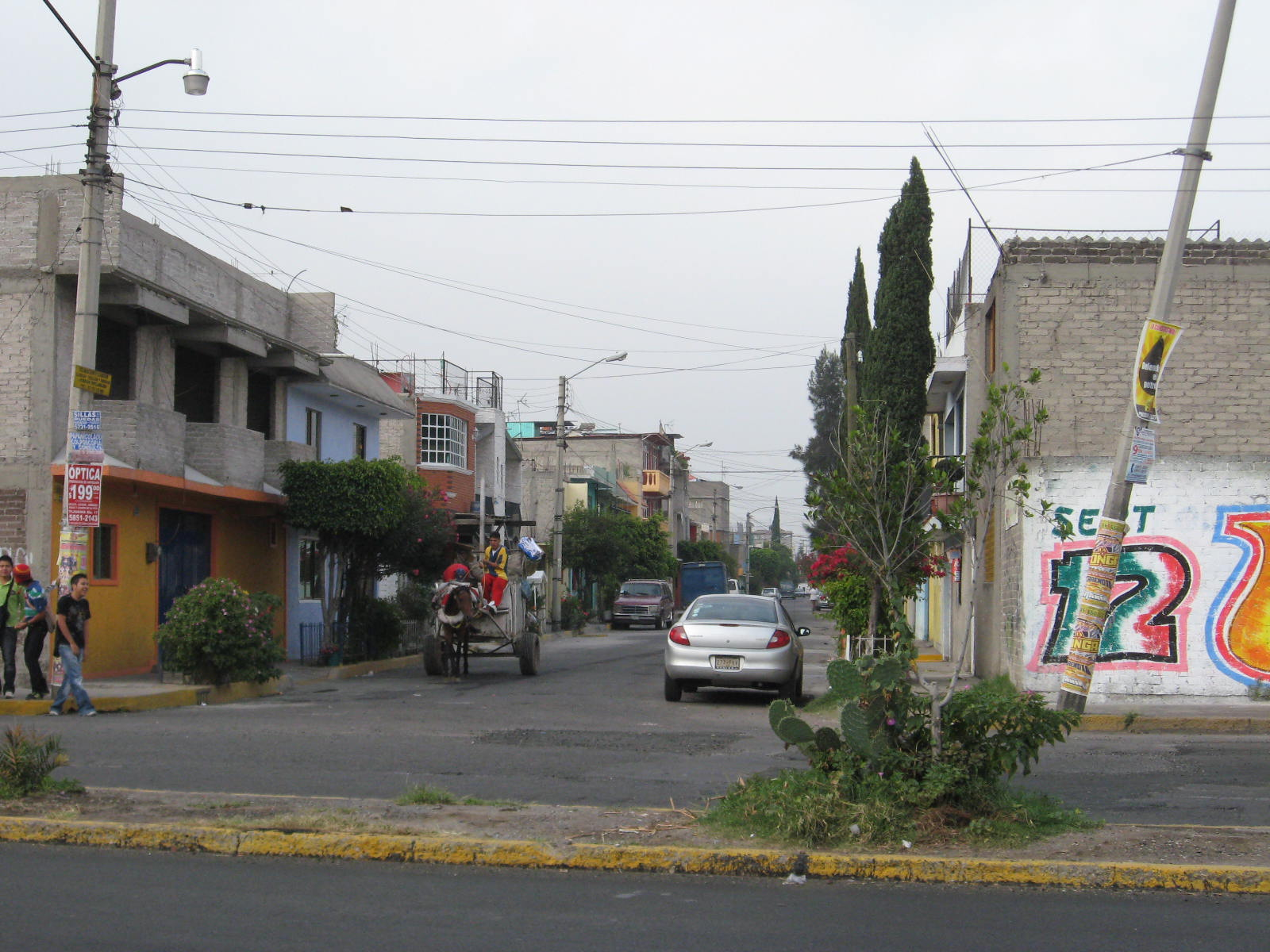
Horse drawn garbage truck in Ciudad Neza

The city is looked down upon by the residents of Mexico City proper, calling it "mi-Nezota" or "Neza York," which refers to its sprawling size, and urban atmosphere devoid of the colonial structures in the center of town. Trash collection is still done by donkey cart in a number of areas of the city. The city has one of the highest crime rates in the State of Mexico.

However, the city is also home of the Orquesta Sinfónica Infantil y Banda Sinfónica de Nezahualcóyotl ("Junior Symphony Orchestra and Symphony Band of Nezahualcóyotl"), created in 1998. It is composed of 45 members ranging in age from 6 to 17 years. It is the only organization of its type in the State of Mexico. It has won various awards, including the "Premio estatal de la juventud 2002" (State Youth Prize of 2002). The orchestra has performed over 200 times, most of these concerts outside of the city itself. It is directed by Roberto Sánchez Chavez.

=== Landmarks ===
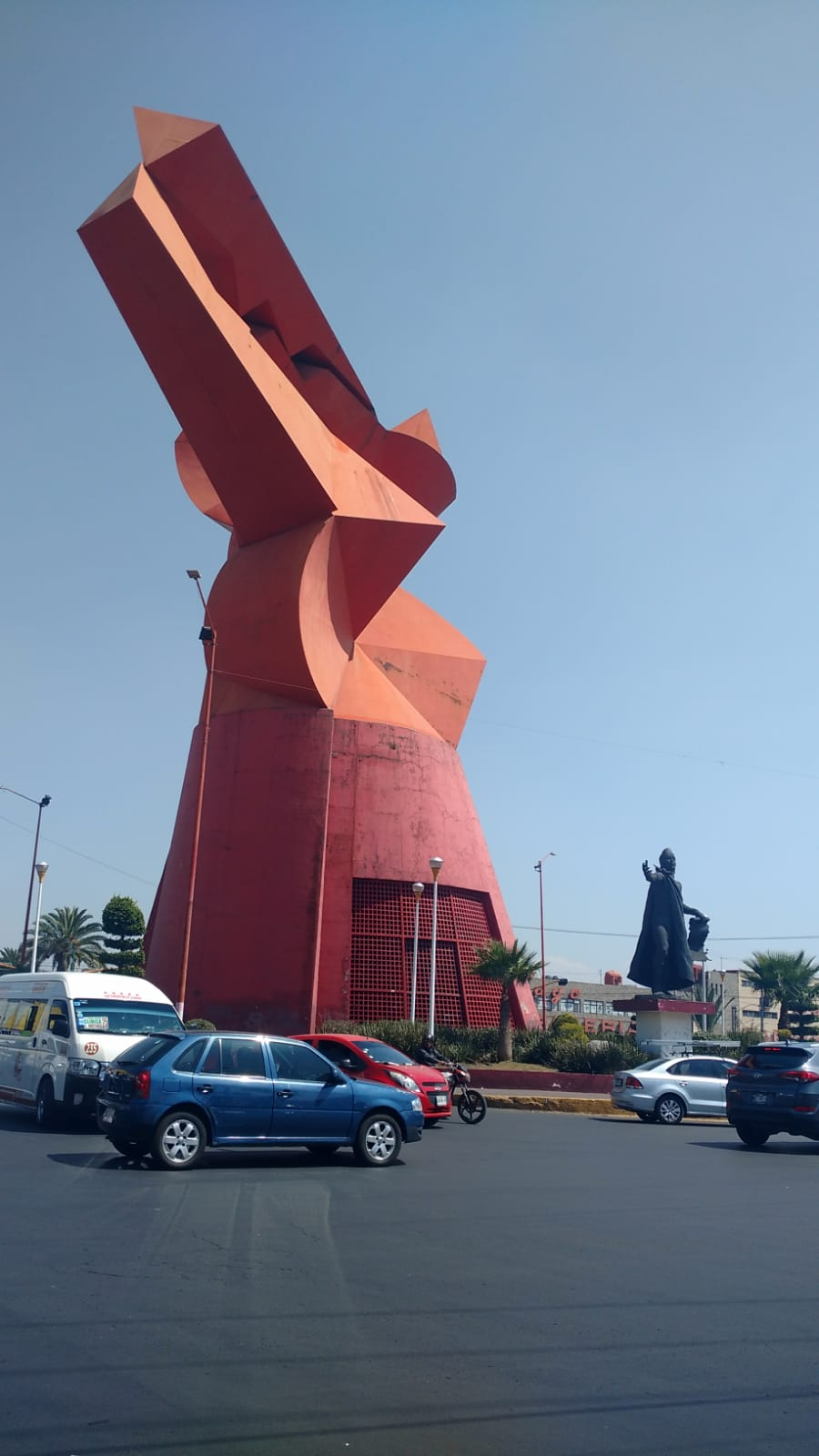
Coyote en Ayuno

All of its civil constructions such as the municipal palace, the Casa de Cultura, the Alfredo del Mazo Vélez Auditorium and others are of modern design. In front of the municipal palace there are monuments to Nezahualcóyotl, Cuauhtémoc and Miguel Hidalgo y Costilla located on the Plaza Unión de Fuerzas. Germán Aréchiga Torres is history writer specialist in this place.

Since 2013 the city has had its own cathedral, officially called the Cathedral of Jesús Señor de la Divina Misericordia (Jesus of the Divine Mercy), but is more commonly called the Cathedral of Nezahualcóyotl. The cathedral was inaugurated by ex bishop José María Hernández González and contains an adjoining chapel, atrium, bookstore and exterior altarpieces which contains the Lord's Prayer in six languages: Spanish, Latin, Nahuatl, Hebrew, Aramaic and Greek. The year after its opening, the cathedral was robbed of an urn and the sanctuary of Nuestra Señora de María Faustina de Polonia, with a value of over 300,000 pesos. The main cultural center for the city is the Centro Cultural Jaime Torres Bodet (named for Jaime Torres Bodet) inaugurated on 25 August 1987. The building has three areas. On the ground floor are workshops, exposition halls and conference rooms. On the first floor, there is the Bodet Library, and on the second floor is the Centro de Información y Documentación de Nezahualcóyotl (Center for Information and Documentation of Nezahualcóyotl. This center compiles historical, legal, cartographic, photographic and other types of information about the city and municipality. Other cultural centers include the José Martín Cultural Center, which has the José Guadalupe Posadas gallery, and the Hortus Gallery, which is the first contemporary art gallery in the city.

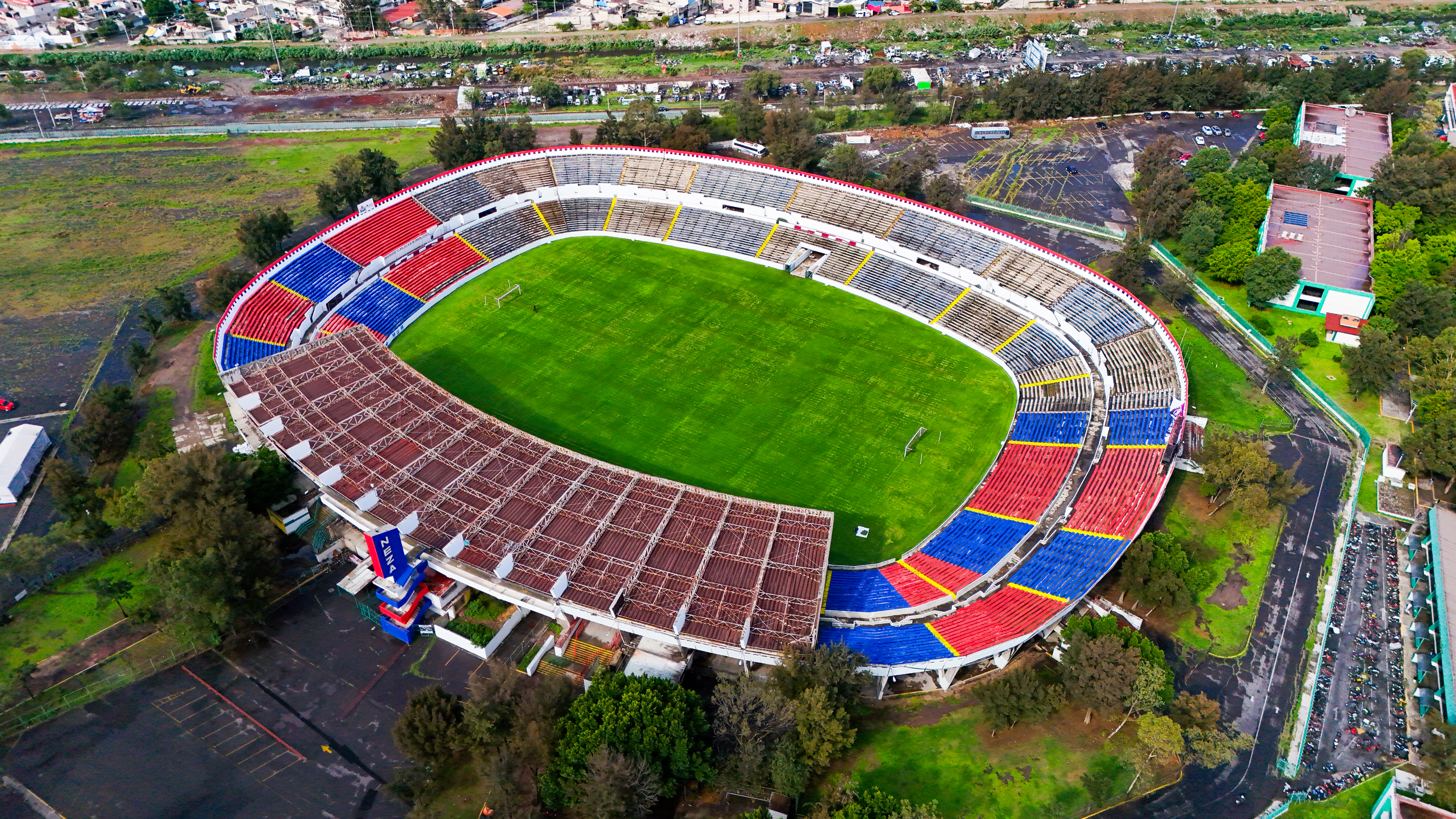
Aerial view of Neza 86

"José López Portillo" Stadium, better known as the Neza 86 Stadium, was built in 1981. It was originally inaugurated with its formal name, but was re-inaugurated for the 1986 FIFA World Cup, with the México 86 logo from the games leading to its common name. The stadium seats 28,000 people and is officially part of the campus of the Universidad Tecnológica de Nezahualcóyotl (UTN). It has been the home of a number of soccer organizations such as Neza Coyotes, the Osos Grises and the Neza Toros. Since 2002, it has also been the home stadium of Mexico City's professional soccer team, Atlante F.C.

The Parque del Pueblo (People's Park) is an 8.5-hectare park which has an artificial lake, a zoo and a train that offers tours. The park was opened in 1975 and also contains a natural history museum, spaces for educational workshops, a lake and an open-air theatre. The center of the park is its zoo. It and the rest of the park were closed in 2001 for extensive renovations and reopened in 2003. The zoo houses 260 animals of 57 different species, 31 of which are in danger of extinction. It has also successfully bred species such as white-tailed deer, Bengal tigers, llamas, bison and coyotes. The park receives about 20,000 visitors per year with the zoo charging only five pesos for admission. The admission charge finances administration costs and also goes into a fund to treat drug addiction in the city.

The Ciudad Deportiva is a sports center that was built in 1990. It is located on the edge of what was the Bordo de Xochiaca landfill. This was the first stage of the reclamation of the landfill area, and sports facilities for volleyball, tennis, soccer (for children and adults), baseball and other sports were built.

=== Cholos ===
To be a "cholo" is to be a part of a youth subculture associated with drugs and gangs which is strongly associated with Ciudad Neza. The word cholo, as used in various Latin American countries, referred to a person of mixed race (mestizo) from the lower classes. The origin of the cholo culture stems from the "pachuco" culture of the United States in the 1940s among the Hispanics there, which eventually morphed into the gangs that populate cities such as Los Angeles. The phenomenon of gangs came to Mexico from the U.S. in the 1980s. The first Mexican cholo groups came about in the 1990s, and were called by various names, such as "barrios," "clickas" and "gangas." Many of these groups were formed by youths who had spent time in the United States and returned with a different identity. Most cholos are youths between 13 and 25 years old who generally do not finish school beyond the eighth grade. These groups mimic the organization of gangs found in the United States, especially California. Cholos have their own style of dress and speech. They are known for hand signals, tattoos and graffiti. They are also involved in the use and sale of drugs, especially marijuana. Groups of cholos control various territories in the city. Most of the violence among these groups is over territory. Some of the better known cholo gangs in Neza are "41 Street," "DK13," "Cobras 13," "Los Sur 13," "Cobras 38," "Los Mexican," "Los de la 33," "Cacos 13," "La 14" and the "Sur Kings."

The former municipal president, Luis Sánchez, states that this kind of activity is waning and claims only two cholo groups are true active gangs. The rest are imitations of the lifestyle as a type of counterculture. He also states that no more than 500 youths belong to the gangs which have been identified by the authorities. Other sources state that this is not true and more than 100 groups operate in the city with many more members.

=== Cultural and tourist centers ===
Among the cultural centers that are within the municipality of Nezahualcóyotl, are:

Inaugurated on August 25, 1987, it currently has three areas. Room for workshops, exhibitions, conferences and cultural events and with a language center on the ground floor; the library "Dr. Jaime Torres Bodet", whose bibliographical collection (including the children's area) on the first floor exceeds 31,000 copies, and has four computers for the user; Finally, the Nezahualcóyotl Information and Documentation Center (CIDNE) on the second floor, inaugurated on April 23, 1991. It has a bookstore from the publishing house of the economic culture fund with the name of the writer Elena Poniatoska. Cultural activities are programmed in coordination with the municipal authorities and society in general. The CIDNE collects valuable information related to the municipality in historical-legal, bibliographic, cartographic, photographic, newspaper and video topics; materials that can be consulted and photocopied.

"El Pulpo" water park, on Monday March 23, 2015, the Nezahualcóyotl city council inaugurated the "El Pulpo" water park, which was added to one of the 70 public spaces that have been recovered in the municipality and is one of the new water parks like El Barquito and Las Fuentes, these free recreational spaces aim to provide the children of Nezahualcóyotl with new places of recreation.

The El Pulpo water park has fountains that work with recycled drinking water, the primary objective of which is to avoid waste since the park operates with 25 cubic meters of water, which is recycled and after weekly maintenance, only two square meters of water are lost.

==== Cultural Activities ====
In the parks of Nezahualcóyotl, the most popular cultural activities include:

- Cultural events and festivals: Throughout the year, various celebrations are organized that highlight the rich cultural tradition of the region, promoting community participation and the enjoyment of the arts.
- Open-air theater: In spaces such as the People's Park, theatrical performances are held, including traditional plays that attract families and visitors.
- Educational Workshops: Many parks have designated workshop areas that encourage learning in various artistic and cultural disciplines, from painting to music.
- Exhibitions and fairs: Local art exhibitions and fairs are held allowing artists to display their work and visitors to enjoy local culture.
- Recreational Activities: In addition to cultural activities, hiking and biking trails, as well as picnic areas, are offered, complementing the cultural experience with a focus on outdoor recreation.

These events not only enrich the cultural life of the municipality, but also foster a sense of community among its inhabitants.

==== Others ====
Currently, line 3 of the Mexibus System is in operation, which runs from the Pantitlán Metro station to the municipality of Chimalhuacán. This has 25 stations that cross the municipality of Nezahualcóyotl in its Chimalhuacán, Villada and Bordo de Xochiaca avenues.

== The old Bordo de Xochiaca landfill ==
The Bordo de Xochiaca landfill was one of the largest landfills in the Valley of Mexico, covering 150 ha (370 acres). It was an open-pit landfill which operated from the 1970s until it was closed in 2006. At one time it was ranked as one of the dirtiest in the world by the World Bank. At the time of closure, it was estimated to receive an average of about twelve thousand tons of trash.

In the 2000s, a project called Ciudad Jardín Bicentenario was undertaken to seal the landfill and reclaim the land for various purposes. The project first aimed to close and seal the landfill. At the start of the project, about 600 people, who lived around the fill making a living by sorting through the trash were relocated. Next steps were taken to stabilize the ground and install a system to monitor and manage methane and other gases produced by the decomposing garbage. 2,500 m (8,200 ft) of tubes were laid to collect methane gas to lead the collected material to an extraction station. The gas is extracted to keep it from going directly into the atmosphere and to use it for fuel, principally to produce electricity. Investors also predict that the recovery system will prevent 93,000 t (92,000 long tons; 103,000 short tons) of carbon dioxide from entering the atmosphere. Rainwater catchment systems were also placed in the area to capture and reuse runoff for the irrigation and cleaning of the 350,000 m^{2} (3,800,000 sq ft) of grass that has been planted on the site.

The entire project has required an investment of three billion pesos, with most of the money coming from Grupo Carso, headed by Carlos Slim Helú. The Ciudad Jardín Bicentenario contains a shopping mall, a rehabilitation center related to the Teletón, campuses of the Universidad de La Salle and the Universidad Autónoma del Estado de México, offices of the federal judiciary, an installation of the Telmex Foundation, a hospital called VIVO associated with the Star Médica association.

Lastly, the landfill area also contains the expansion and completion of the Ciudad Deportiva. The facilities were finished in 2009 and stated by investors to be the most modern sports facility in Mexico. The facility was inaugurated in March 2009 by state Governor Enrique Peña Nieto and principal investor Carlos Slim Helú. It contains a nearly Olympic-sized stadium, a cycling track, two gymnasiums, 25 soccer fields, five for indoor soccer, two American football fields, four tennis courts, four basketball courts, four volleyball courts, two jai alai courts, two baseball fields, an aerobics floor, playgrounds and recreational areas. However, as of January 2010, it is closed to the public because state and municipal authorities have not regularized the title of the land on which it sits. Entrance to the facilities will be free, due to corporate sponsorship to cover administrative costs.

The project has generated over six thousand jobs directly and indirectly and will benefit more than two million inhabitants of Nezahualcóyotl, Chimalhuacán and other areas of the eastern Valley of Mexico.

== Education ==
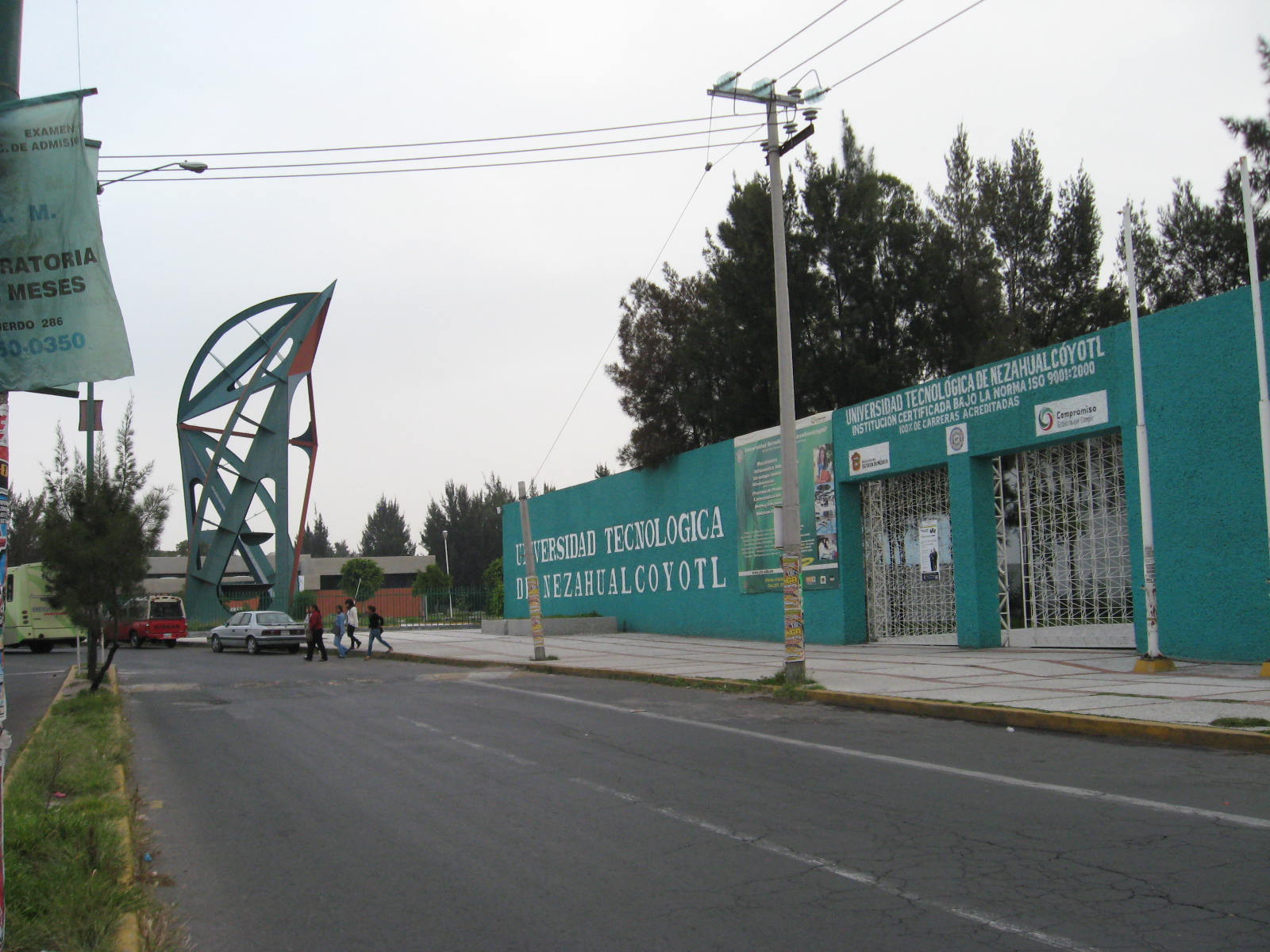
Entrance to the main campus of UTN

Universidad Tecnológica de Nezahualcóyotl (UTN) (Technological University of Nezahualcóyotl), was created by the Congress of the State of Mexico in 1991 as part of the Subsistema de Universidades Tecnológicas of Mexico. The institution offers six two-year degrees in Administration, Commerce, Computer Science, Processes of production, Environmental Technology and Telematics. The campus has extensive sports facilities including a volleyball court, an Olympic-sized pool, and a professional football stadium.

Facultad de Estudios Superiores Aragón, UNAM. FES-Aragón (Faculty of Superior Studies – Aragón UNAM, part of the decentralization program of the Universidad Nacional Autónoma de México.) This campus is designed for between fifteen and twenty thousand students. FES-Aragón offers twelve degrees in architecture, Journalism, Law, Industrial Design, Economics, Civil Engineering, Computer Engineering, Mechanical Engineering, Electrical Engineering, Pedagogy, Agricultural Development and Planning, International Relations, and Sociology. It also offers a number of graduate degrees. The campus contains a Computer Center, an Open University and a Foreign Language Center.

== Transportation ==
Mexico City Metro

- Line B Buenavista-Ciudad Azteca: Nezahualcóyotl, Impulsora, Río de los Remedios

Mexibus

- Line 3 Chimalhuacán-Pantitlán: Las Torres, Bordo de Xochiaca, Rancho Grande, Las Mañanitas, Rayito del Sol, General Vicente Villada, El Castillito, Sor Juana Ines de la Cruz, Palacio Municipal, Adolfo López Mateos, Lago de Chapala, Nezahualcóyotl, Virgencitas, Vicente Riva Palacio, Maravillas, El Barquito

== Climate ==
Nezahualcóyotl has a oceanic climate (subtropical highland variety) (Köppen: Cwb).

Climate data for Nezahualcoyotl
Month	Jan	Feb	Mar	Apr	May	Jun	Jul	Aug	Sep	Oct	Nov	Dec	Year
Mean daily maximum °C (°F)	21.4 (70.5)	23.6 (74.5)	25.4 (77.7)	26.6 (79.9)	27.0 (80.6)	25.0 (77.0)	23.7 (74.7)	23.6 (74.5)	22.9 (73.2)	22.7 (72.9)	22.4 (72.3)	21.6 (70.9)	23.8 (74.9)
Daily mean °C (°F)	13.7 (56.7)	15.6 (60.1)	17.6 (63.7)	19.3 (66.7)	19.9 (67.8)	18.9 (66.0)	17.7 (63.9)	17.6 (63.7)	17.2 (63.0)	16.3 (61.3)	14.9 (58.8)	13.9 (57.0)	16.9 (62.4)
Mean daily minimum °C (°F)	6.9 (44.4)	8.2 (46.8)	9.9 (49.8)	12.0 (53.6)	13.1 (55.6)	13.6 (56.5)	12.9 (55.2)	13.0 (55.4)	13.0 (55.4)	11.1 (52.0)	8.7 (47.7)	7.1 (44.8)	10.8 (51.4)
Average precipitation mm (inches)	10.2 (0.40)	10.0 (0.39)	11.4 (0.45)	17.9 (0.70)	30.7 (1.21)	130.3 (5.13)	161.6 (6.36)	168.2 (6.62)	164.9 (6.49)	73.0 (2.87)	20.5 (0.81)	6.8 (0.27)	805.5 (31.7)
Average relative humidity (%)	56.0	49.9	45.4	45.4	51.0	62.9	70.4	71.3	73.7	70.5	64.2	58.7	60.0
Mean monthly sunshine hours	253.4	250.5	285.2	295.2	297.7	254.4	257.2	256.9	225.8	240.0	237.7	253.6	3,107.6
Source: Weather.Directory

== Neza York/New York ==
Until the 2000s, most migrants to the United States, especially to places like New York, were from poor rural areas. However, since the turn of the century, another wave of immigrants is coming from poor urban areas such as Nezahualcóyotl. These immigrants tend to be younger and better educated than their rural counterparts, and this tends to separate the communities. This is creating a new Mexican subculture called "Neza York" distinguished by dress, speech and the likelihood of learning English. Businesses with names like Tacos Neza and Neza Grocery have appeared in New York City.

== The municipality ==
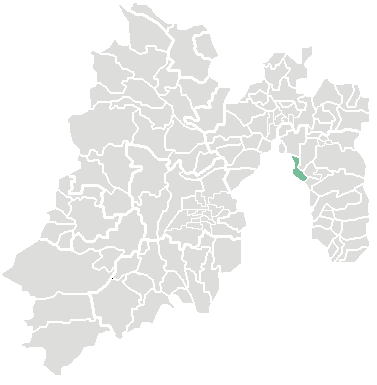
City of Netzahualcoyotl's location within the State of Mexico

The city of Nezahualcóyotl is nearly co extensive with the municipality of Nezahualcóyotl with 99.46% of the municipality's population of 1,110,565 (as of 2010) living within the city limits. Only six localities are considered to be outside the city proper: Colonia Gustavo Baz Prada, Ciudad Jardín, Relleno Sanitario Nezahualcóyotl Segundo, Polígonos, Escuela Laura Riojas de Colosio and 17 de Junio, but the city functions as the local government for these communities. It is the second most populous municipality in the State of Mexico, just below Ecatepec, and the ninth largest in the country. It lies at 2,220 meters above sea level.

The municipality is located in the east of the Valley of Mexico and is part of Greater Mexico City. The municipality borders the municipalities of Ecatepec de Morelos, La Paz, Chimalhuacán and San Salvador Atenco in the State of Mexico. To the west and south, it borders the borough of Gustavo A. Madero, Venustiano Carranza, Iztapalapa and Iztacalco of Mexico City and at the northwest it borders the remains of the Federal Zone of Lake Texcoco.

The municipality has a territory of 63.44 km^{2}, 81% of which is occupied by the city, which consists of 86 neighborhoods called colonias. The rest is part of the Federal Zone of the Ex-Basin of Texcoco. The municipality is flat with only one elevation reading 1,220 meters above sea level. The Los Remedios and a brand of the Churubusco River run through here. At the far northeast is a remnant of Lake Texcoco and an artificial lake was built here as part of the Parque del Puebla to serve as an ecological reserve. The climate is temperate with a fairly cold winter and rain mostly falling between June and October. Average temperature is about 15C with temperatures as high as 34C and as low as −5C. The area has little to no native wild flora and fauna due to the fact that it was underwater until the 20th century and the area is nearly completely urbanized. However, in winter a number of bird species such as cranes and storks pass through.

Because of it urban nature, there is no agriculture in the area and livestock production is minimal, restricted to the very northeastern edges of the municipality and only for self consumption. The economy of the municipality is mostly based on commerce, employing over 90% of the population. The second major employer is industry, mostly microindustries.

=== Neighborhoods (Colonias in spanish) ===
Localities (cities, towns, and villages) are:

Name	2010 Census population
Ciudad Nezahualcóyotl	1,104,585
Colonia Gustavo Baz Prada	3,291
Polígonos	2,482
Ciudad Jardín	91
Nezahualcóyotl Segundo [Relleno Sanitario]	64
17 de Junio	34
Laura Riojas de Colosio [school]	18
Total municipality	1,110,565

== Notable residents ==
- El Bogueto, Mexican rapper
- Marisol Domínguez, better known as AimeP3, Internet celebrity
- Grisell Pérez (1982–2021), human rights activist

== Depictions ==
- Sábado de mierda is a 1988 semi-documentary focusing on the Mierdas Punks gang of Neza
