= One World Futbol =

Soccer ball

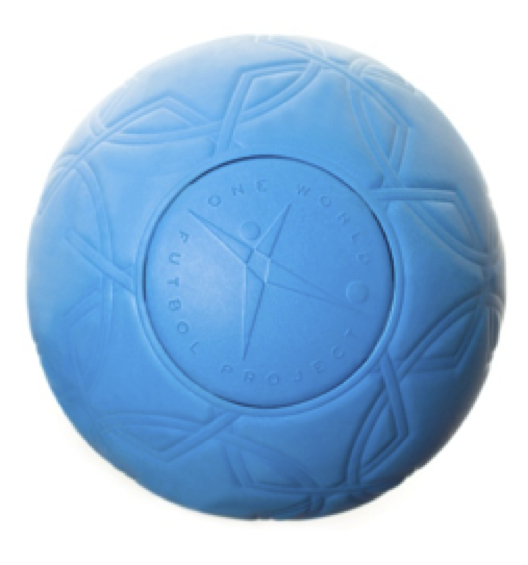
A One World Futbol

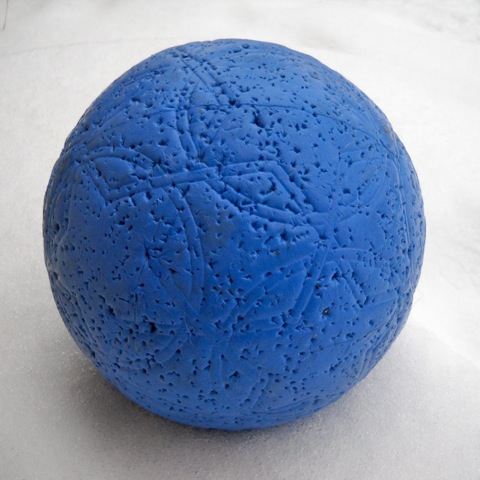
a One World Futbol that is still inflated after sustaining extensive damage from dog bites

The One World Futbol is a soccer ball designed to be difficult to destroy. It is made with a specialized foam, related to the material used to make Crocs shoes, that allows the ball to re-inflate after being punctured. The One World Play Project, which manufactures and distributes the One World Futbol, was founded in California in 2010 to manufacture, sell, and donate the balls.

According to an interview with Katie Couric, the company has produced about 850,000 balls. About half of them were bought for $40 each; for each ball purchased, another is given away. The ball has been spread by numerous organizations and made its way to over 140 countries.

== History ==
The One World Futbol was conceived by Tim Jahnigen of Berkeley, California after he watched a documentary that featured children in Darfur playing with soccer balls made of trash. These makeshift balls were used because traditional soccer balls rapidly became too damaged to be usable in the rocky ground that the children played in. Jahnigen, who had previously met the developers of Crocs shoes and had used durable early Crocs prototypes, came up with the idea of using ethylene-vinyl acetate foam, a similar material, to create the ball. The ball self re-inflates, eliminating the need for air pumps, can still be used after being punctured, and can withstand heat and cold.

Jahnigen did not immediately pursue the idea, as he did not have the funding to do so. He brought up the idea while speaking with the musician Sting, who gave Jahnigen research and development funding for the ball. As a result of the support, the ball itself was named after The Police song "One World".

The One World Play Project, responsible for manufacturing, selling, and donating the balls, was founded as a certified Benefit corporation in July 2010 before the final game of the 2010 FIFA World Cup in South Africa. The balls were initially priced at $39.50, under an arrangement in which the purchase pays for one ball for the purchaser and a second ball to be donated. In May 2012, Chevrolet announced a sponsorship agreement in which the company would purchase and donate one and a half million One World Futbols.

Tim Jahnigen stated that he intends to eventually manufacture a version of every inflated sports ball using the damage resistant foam.

In 2013, Richard Swanson used a One World Futbol in an attempt to dribble the futbol from the U.S. city of Seattle, Washington, to São Paulo, Brazil. During his attempt, he was hit by a pickup truck and died later that day in Lincoln City, Oregon.

In 2014, the One World Futbol appeared on BBC's Blue Peter, where they put the ball to the test.
