= Sebastián (sculptor) =

Mexican sculptor

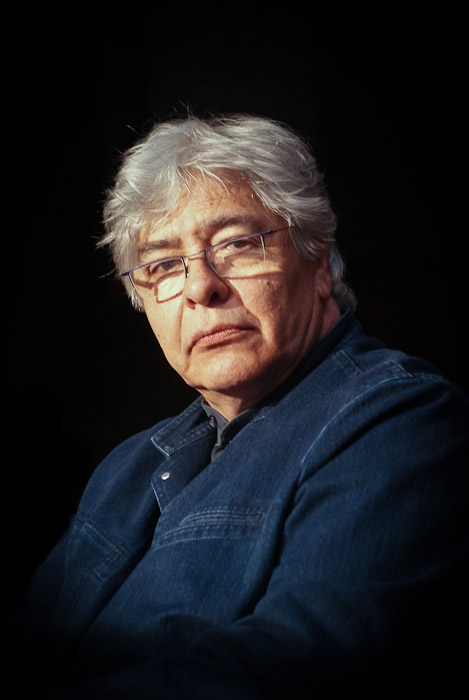
- Born: Enrique Carbajal González; November 16, 1947 (age 78); Camargo, Chihuahua, Mexico
- Known for: Sculptures

Enrique Carbajal González (born November 16, 1947), known professionally as Sebastián, is a Mexican sculptor best known for his monumental works of steel and/or concrete in both Mexico and abroad. These include a number of "gate" sculptures such as the Gran Puerta a México in Matamoros, Tamaulipas, but his most famous sculpture is El Caballito located in downtown Mexico City. His works are found in various countries outside Mexico, such as Japan where two are now used as city symbols.

== Early life and career ==
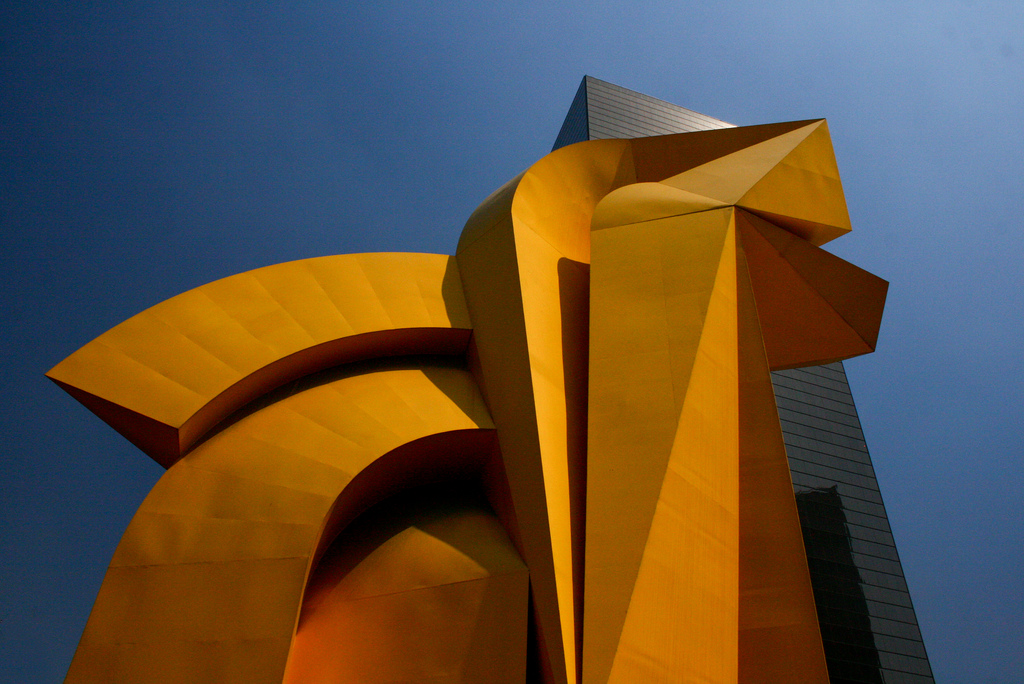
Cabeza de Caballo in México City.

Sebastián was born Enrique Carbajal González on November 16, 1947, in Santa Rosalía de Camargo, Chihuahua, in northern Mexico. He knew he wanted to be an artist since he was a small child. He lived in Chihuahua until he began studying in the Escuela Nacional de Artes Plásticas in Mexico City in 1964. When studying in Mexico City, he survived by working at restaurants and buying clothing to sell it for a profit in Chihuahua. Heavily influenced by the work of Henry Moore and Pablo Picasso, he won first place in the 1965 Annual Exposition of the National Plastic Arts School at UNAM.

He was 21 and a student at ENAP when the 1968 student strikes broke out. After the October 2 massacre, he was detained along with many other students for his participation in the movement. That same year Sebastián had his first individual show featuring his ceramic work in the Museum of Art of Ciudad Juárez.

He adopted the pseudonym Sebastián after the painting of Saint Sebastian by Botticelli.

He lives and has his workshop in Mexico City. His art career has also led him to work with various organizations such as the Worlds Arts Forum Council in Geneva, the Artists Council in Defense of the Lascaux Caves in France, Consejo Nacional para la Cultura y las Artes, the board of the State of Mexico Symphonic Orchestra, the administrative board of the Fundación Margarita Miranda de Mascareñas and the International Sculpture Council. In 1977 he was a founding member of the Sociedad Mexicana de Derechos de Author and in 1985 he was president of the Asociación Nacional de Artistas Plásticas in Mexico.

== Career ==
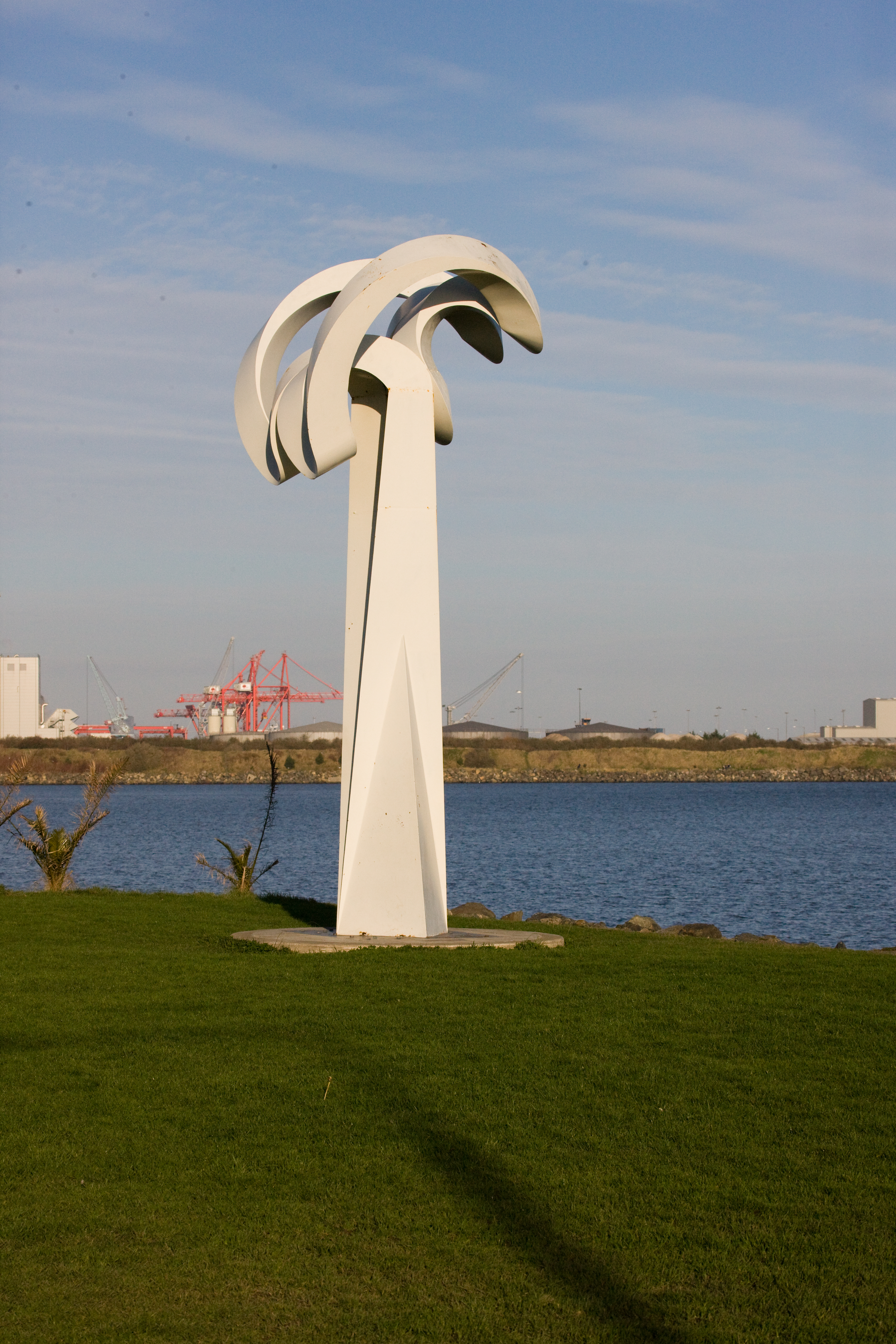
Awaiting the Mariner in Dublin

He began his career near the end of the 1960s. After completing his formal studies he continued his work with short-lived schools and movements such as the "Salon Independiente". He put on his second individual exposition, where he displayed ostensibly simple paper carton works that he called "desplegables" (folders). These smaller works became the base of ideas for his later monumental works made with tons of iron and concrete. Since 1968, he has had over 120 individual exhibitions of his work in Mexico, Germany, Belgium, Brazil, Colombia, Spain, the Netherlands, Sweden, Norway, Ireland, England, Portugal, Italy, Denmark, Canada, Finland, the US, France, Japan, Switzerland and Venezuela. His work has been shown in the main museums of Mexico including the Museo de Arte Moderno, the Palacio de Bellas Artes, the Museo Tamayo, the Museo de Ciencias y Artes of UNAM, the Palacio de Minería and the Museo de San Ildefonso in Mexico City. In 2012 he held an exhibit at the Museo de Bellas Artes of the State of Mexico in Toluca. He has served as a jury member at the North American Sculpture Exhibition in Colorado (1986, 1991), the Concurso Nacional and Triennial Americana de Escultura en Madera in Argentina (1993) and the Alexandria Biennial (2001).

He was the artist in residence for Dartmouth College (1990) and he received a fellowship from the Sistema Nacional de Creadores de Arte (1994-1996).

In addition to the creation of sculpture and other art, he has worked as an academic, giving courses, workshops and conferences at various universities and other institutions in Mexico and abroad. In 1973 he was a guest lecturer at the Bezalel Academy of Arts and Design . In 1985 he became an academic associated with the Academia de Artes in Mexico. In 1992 he presented at the Universidad Autónoma de la Laguna in Torreón. For over twenty five years he has been a professor and researcher at the Universidad Nacional Autónoma de Mexico. He also teaches sculpture, visualization and multimedia classes at the Institutio Tecnológico de Monterrey in Mexico City.

== Significant works ==
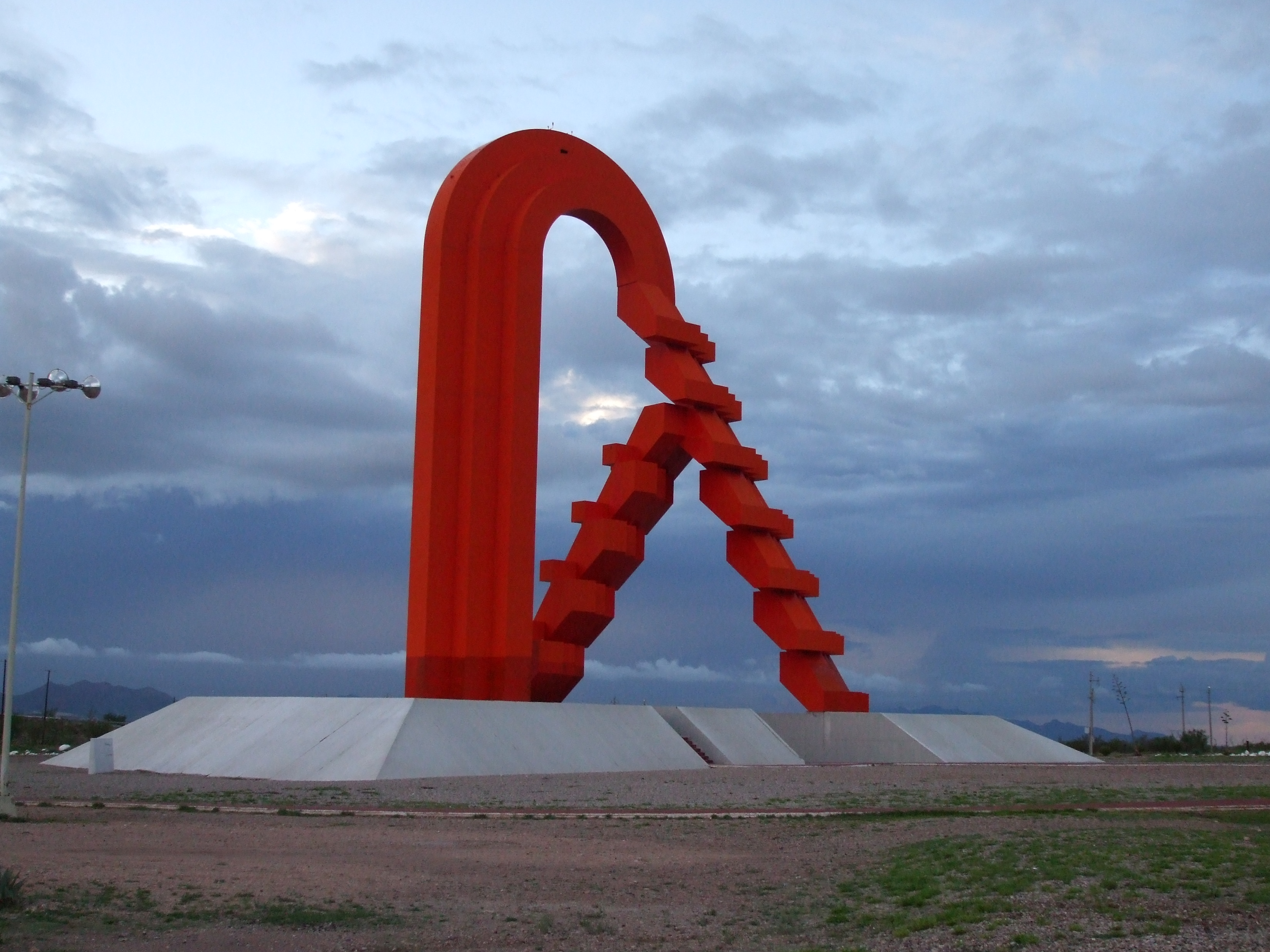
La Puerta a Chihuahua ("The Gate to Chihuahua")

Sebastián is best known for his monumental sculptures in steel and/or concrete in urban settings, of which he has done over 200 in various parts of the world. These works are mostly based on smaller earlier works such as Leonardo 4, Durero 4 and Brancusi 4. In Mexico, his best known monumental sculpture is officially called “Cabeza de caballo” (horse's head) but is generally referred to as the "Caballito" (little horse), located in downtown Mexico City. Other works by Sebastián appear in Nuevo León, Tabasco, Morelos, Guerrero, Chiapas, Michoacán, and other states. These include "gate" structures such as the Puerta de Torreón, La Puerta del Sol, La Puerta a Chihuahua, and the Gran Puerta de México in Matamoros, Tamaulipas. Other monumental sculptures by the artist include the El Torreón al Porvenir for Torreón 100th anniversary and the Arcos del Milenio in Guadalajara for the nation's 200th anniversary of its independence. His 2007 work with the Ruta Escultórica del Acero y el Cemento (Sculpture in Steel and Cement Route) in the State of Mexico was somewhat controversial in that he stated he would not receive any money for his work but charged the state over seventeen million pesos for materials and workmen's labor.

Outside Mexico, his monumental sculptures can be found in cities such as Kingston, Buenos Aires, Havana, Montevideo, Rio de Janeiro Albuquerque, Denver, San Antonio, New York, Bern, Hakone, Nagoya, Osaka, and Montreal. These include "El Quijote" in Alcalá de Henares, Spain, the Phoenix Arch for the city of Sakai, Japan, used as its symbol, a similar piece called "Tsuru" for the city of Kadoma, Japan, and a sculpture for the Kadona Sports Center, all done in the 1990s.

== Recognitions and awards ==
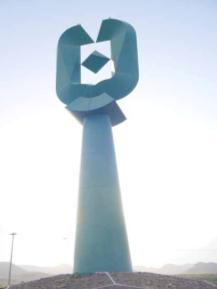
El Arbol de la Vida ('The Tree of Life')

Sebastián's first award for his work was in 1965 at the Escuela Nacional de Artes Plásticas annual exhibition while he was still a student, followed by placing first at the same school's Exposición Annual de Mobilario y Escultura in 1967. During his career, these were followed by first prize at the Primera Bienal de Arte in Morelia, Michoacán (1974), first prize at the Concurso Nacional de Escultura Monumento a las Nacionalidad Mexicana sponsored by INAH in Mexico City (1981), the UNAM Medal for his participation with the Centro de Espacio Escultórico in Mexico City (1983), the Prize of the Jury at the International Graphic Biennial in Norway (1984, 1992), the Asociación del Claustro de Sor Juana Medal (1984), the Tomás Valles Vivar Prize in Chihuahua (1985), the Superior Prize at the Competition and Homage to Henry Moore at the Hakone Open-Air Museum in Japan (1987), the Bronze Award from the ABC Ashi Broadcasting Corporation in Osaka (1990), the Bronze Prize from the International Painting Triennial in Osaka (1990), the Sol Caracol Prize from the Instituto Superior de Arquitectura y Diseño Industrial at the University of Chihuahua (1992), the Grand Prize and Gold Prize at the A-ORC 200 in Osaka (1992), the Japan Silver Prize at the Sculpture Triennial in Osaka (1992), the Mainichi Broadcasting System Prize at the International Painting Triennial in Osaka (1993), the Kinki Nippon Railway Prize at the Osaka Sculpture Triennial (1995, 1998), the Moquette Awards at the Fifth Kajima Sculpture Contest in Tokyo (1997), the Lifetime Achievement Award from RGI Global Marketing in Detroit (1998), the Medaille de la Ville de Paris in France (1999), the Torch of Friendship Appreciation Award in San Antonio (2002), the Jerusalem Prize from the Zionist Federation of Mexico and the City of Jerusalem (2005) .

He was a guest of honor at the Art Triennial in Cairo, Egypt, and the World Economic Forum in Davos, Switzerland, both in 1994, the International Sculpture Symposium in Beijing and the Art Biennial in Beijing (2003) .

He has been inducted as an honorary member of the Royal Academy of Art, The Hague (1983), a member of the Academia Nacional de las Artes, the Salón de la Plástica Mexicana and the Legión de Honor Nacional de México. (1987) . He has also received honorary doctorates from the Universidad Autónoma de La Laguna in Torreón (2003), the Universidad Autónoma de Chihuahua (2004), the City College of New York, the Universidad Autónoma de Colima and the Universidad Autónoma Metropolitana (2011) .

Other recognitions include two from his hometown of Camargo in 1985 and 1988, being named its "favorite son". In 1997 and 2012, Mexico's National Lottery issued tickets in his honor. He also received the Gral. Angel Trias Alvarez Medal from the Sociedad Chihuahuense de Estudios Históricos (1998), recognition from the Parlamente Cultural de MERCOSUR (2005) and the keys to the city of Matamoros, Tamaulipas (2005).

== Artistry ==
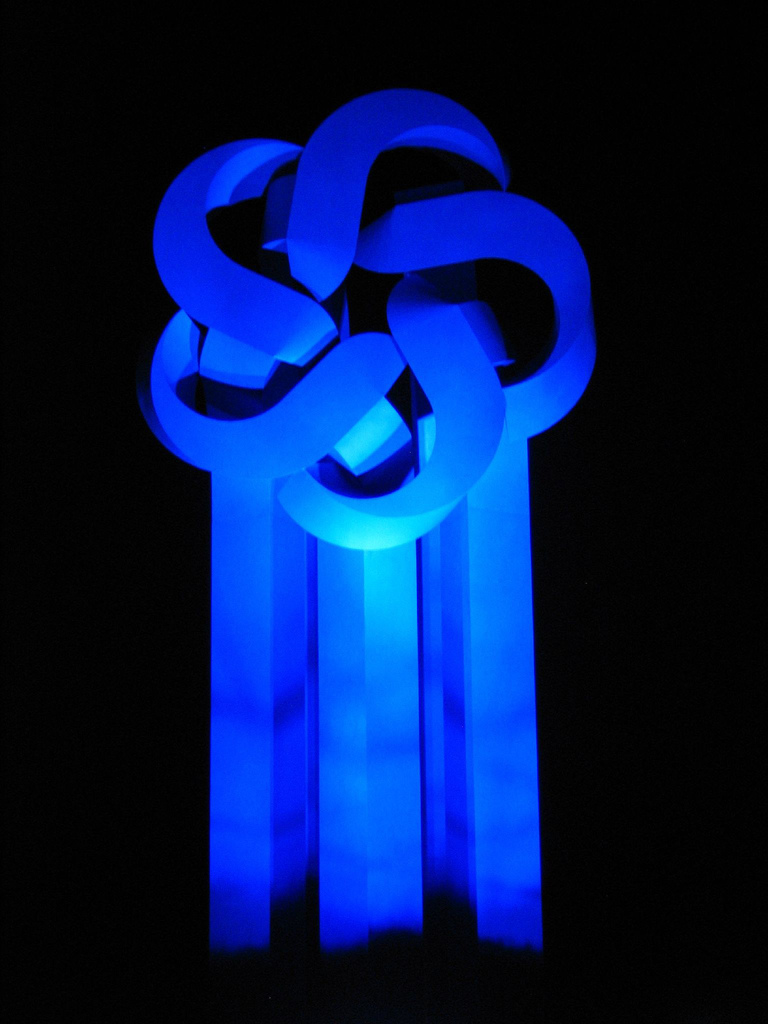
Fonatur art work

While Sebastián has done architectural design, painting, art objects, furniture design, jewelry, costume design, set design and multimedia shows, he is best known for his sculpture. His work is considered to be unique in Mexico and Latin America. Much of his style can be traced to his second individual exhibition where he displayed ostensibly simple paper carton works that he called "desplegables" (folders). These seemingly small works became the base of ideas for his later monumental works made with tons of iron and concrete. Much of his sculptural work has kinetic appeal even if the parts do not move. Geometric concepts are also very important to his work.

He believes that the future of art is in science and technology as well as art for locations beyond Earth. His work has kept up with technological advances. One exhibition used biological electroplating, mimicking processes done by some sea creatures.

== Fundación Cultural Sebastián and Museo Sebastian ==
The Fundación Cultural Sebastián was founded in 1997 with Sebastián as first president as a non-governmental cultural organization to promote Mexican cultural values, especially the arts. It has hosted exhibitions by young artists, concerts, dance recitals, visual arts and literary events and more. It also promotes techniques to preserve artworks to avoid their loss in the future because of expensive renovation work. It also sponsors a number of artistic competitions on the national level as well as in the states of Quintana Roo and Colima .

The Museo Sebastián is located on one side of the Plaza Merino in the city of Chihuahua, which used to be the site of a large market in the 18th and 19th centuries. The building was constructed in the 1880s as a mansion. After the Mexican Revolution it became a commercial building. In 1995, the city acquired it to create a cultural center as well as a museum to honor Sebastián. It contains several exhibition halls and a permanent collection of Sebastián's work on display as well as areas for cultural and other kinds of events.

== See also ==
- Ángel Custodio, Puebla
- Coyote en Ayuno, Nezahualcóyotl
- Guerrero Chimalli, Chimalhuacán
- La X, Ciudad Juárez
