= La Puerta del Sol =

1998 sculpture in Chihuahua, Mexico by Sebastián

Coordinates: 28.70233°N 106.13151°W

- Interactive map of La Puerta del Sol
- Location: Chihuahua, Mexico
- Type: Sculpture
- Material: Steel

La Puerta del Sol, translated as The Gateway of the Sun, is one of the largest sculptures in Chihuahua, Mexico. It is also known as The Gateway of the Obelisks.

La Puerta del Sol is one of the most characteristic sculptures of Chihuahua. It is located at Periferico de la Juvendtud and Circuito Universitario avenues. The sculpture was made in 1998 by Enrique Carbajal González, known by his alias Sebastián, from Camargo, Chihuahua.

In this sculpture, Sebastián represented the shape of T of the doors in Paquime, Chihuahua, the site of ancient cultural ruins.

== Shape ==
The sculpture is 35 meters tall and 16 meters wide. Its simplicity as a rectangle plays a role in the presence of the sun, which produces a shadow with different angles depending on the time of day and season. It has two viewing angles, facing front or back, from east to west or vice versa. The light of the sun is visible through the door at the moment when it is set during the afternoon.

The sculpture is often vandalized as its white paint corrodes. Graffiti sporadically appears at the base of the sculpture. The sculpture is re-painted regularly by the government to combat decay.
