= Death of Richard Swanson =

Death during a long-distance soccer dribbling attempt

Coordinates: 44.919328°N 124.010103°W

Richard Swanson
- Born: May 19, 1970; Yakima, Washington, U.S.
- Died: May 14, 2013 (aged 42); Lincoln City, Oregon, U.S.
- Cause of death: Traffic collision

Richard Swanson was a 42-year-old American man who tried to dribble a soccer ball from the U.S. city of Seattle, Washington, to São Paulo, Brazil. On May 14, 2013, he died after being hit by a pickup truck alongside U.S. Route 101 just outside Lincoln City, Oregon, 270 miles (430 km) into his planned journey of roughly 10,000 miles (16,000 km). The driver of the truck was tried twice for negligent homicide, the first trial resulting in a hung jury and the second in an acquittal.

Swanson's journey, dubbed Breakaway Brazil, was an ambitious effort that would have taken him through 11 countries over the course of 407 days, through severe conditions and high-crime areas. Robert Andrew Powell of Grantland, in a posthumous profile of Swanson, concluded it was very unlikely he would have succeeded. Swanson live-blogged the effort on social media, and received material support along his route from fans, including people who recognized him on the side of the road. Reflections upon his death focused on his advocacy for One World Futbol—the type of soccer ball he dribbled—and on his having found purpose, as a middle-aged, recently laid-off divorcé, in the fanbase he amassed.

== Background ==
Richard Swanson was born on May 19, 1970, in Yakima, Washington. He married at 19 and had two sons by the age of 24. At 30, he and his wife divorced, and he moved to Seattle, where he worked as a private investigator for eight years. He then went to school to be a graphic designer, becoming a web designer. After being laid off, he did some work in videography. Around this time, he sold his condominium unit, which represented most of his wealth, and moved in with his on-and-off girlfriend. With his younger son now an adult, he felt freed from obligations, and having always wanted to watch a FIFA World Cup, he decided to go to the 2014 Cup in São Paulo, Brazil. Swanson, a backpacker and rec league soccer player described by Sports Illustrated as a "soccer fanatic", decided to travel there by dribbling a soccer ball the roughly 10,000 miles (16,000 km) there—a project he called Breakaway Brazil.

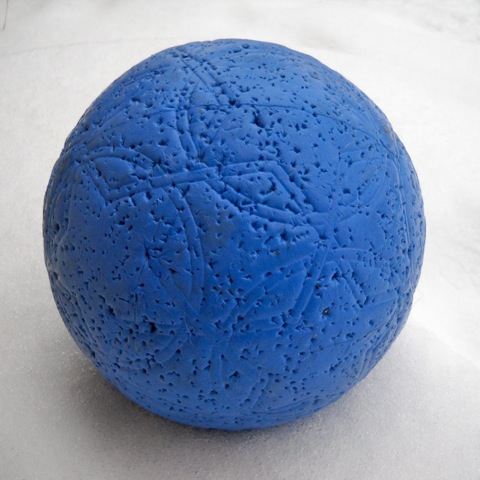
A One World Futbol like the one Swanson used

For his journey, Swanson decided to use a One World Futbol, a soccer ball which is intended to be indestructible and which is donated to people in developing countries. He told the Lincoln City News Guard that "[r]aising awareness for One World Futbol was the missing piece of the puzzle and the deciding factor for me". Using the money from selling his condo, he bought a GoPro HERO and high-end hiking gear including a backpack and tent. He took marathon-length walks, trained at carrying heavy packs, and researched the trip ahead. His plan involved going through desert, jungle, high altitude, and high-crime areas, mostly in countries where he did not speak the language.

Swanson cultivated a social media following in advance of the trip on Facebook, Flickr, and a dedicated website, BreakawayBrazil.com. The trip was to last 407 days and go through 11 countries.

== Journey ==
Swanson started his journey on May 1, 2013, at Seattle's Space Needle. On his second night, staying with someone in Steilacoom, he pared down his backpack's weight by about half, including parting with the laptop he used to update BreakawayBrazil.com. On the third day, he was stopped by a state trooper for illegally walking along Interstate 5, a six-lane highway. He spent two nights with his elder son before crossing the Washington–Oregon border on May 10. Without his laptop, Swanson updated BreakawayBrazil.com with cell phone photos; the site also featured a live GPS tracker. Fans on social media offered him both moral support and places to stay along his journey. Some drivers recognized him and cheered him on or even looped back to give him food or water.

A profile in The Daily News of Longview, Washington, on May 8 said that Swanson was "staying on side roads as much as he can and dribbling the soccer ball only when it's safe". On May 13, the eve of Swanson's death, the News Guard published a profile of him, which described him "carefully navigating his blue One World Futbol through the rain along Highway 18 and onto Highway 101" into Lincoln City, Oregon. He told the paper that "The worst part of the journey so far has been for my feet getting used to it" and that they "ache every day", which had led him to switch from his original walking shoes to sandals.

Swanson averaged 24–26 miles (39–42 km) of progress each day. Robert Andrew Powell in Grantland estimates that Swanson had very little chance of succeeding at his goal of reaching São Paulo in 407 days:

He'd trained for his trip, but he left Seattle so naive that he walked on Interstate 5, which is very much against the law. His tight schedule made reaching São Paulo in time for the World Cup extremely unlikely. Even if he avoided injury. Even if his footwear held up through the desert. Even if bandits never stole his passport and tent and the rest of his possessions. Swanson needed more luck than he could have reasonably expected.

== Death ==
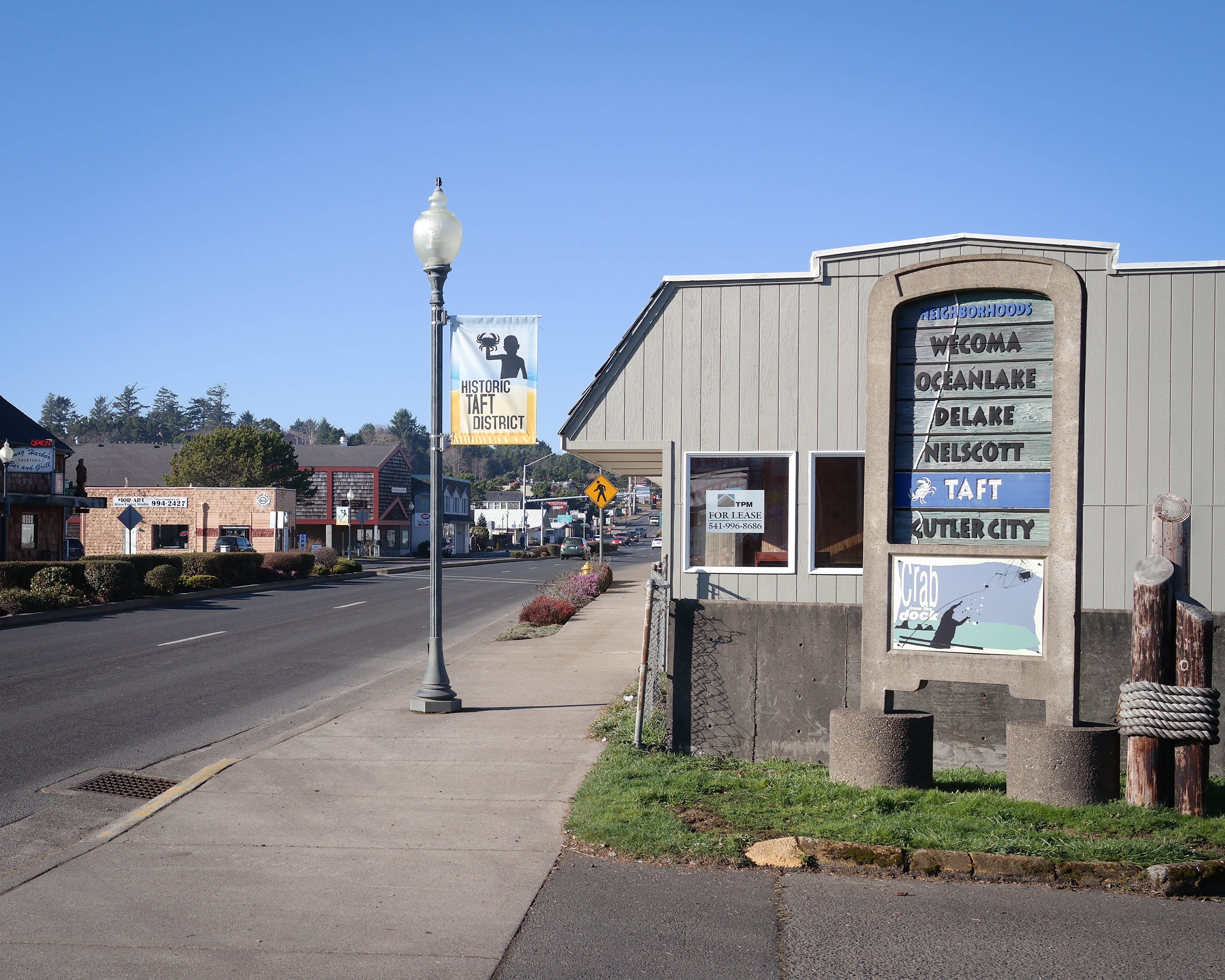
U.S. Route 101 about a mile north of where Swanson died

On May 14, 2013, Swanson uploaded a video of himself dribbling a ball along the beach in Lincoln City. His next scheduled stop was in Newport, Oregon, and he planned to celebrate his birthday with friends in Bandon, Oregon, a few days later. Before starting his trip, Swanson had told KCPQ, "I'll be on Highway 101, but I'll also try to utilize trails that run along the coast, just trying to get off the beaten path, there's a lot of cars and just [try] not [to] get run over."

At about 10 a.m., Swanson was hit from behind by a 1995 Nissan pickup truck while walking along Route 101, shortly after leaving Lincoln City limits. He was walking southbound on the southbound shoulder of the road, which according to Lincoln City Police was "technically ... the wrong side of the highway". (Note: In Oregon, pedestrians are instructed to walk on the left side of the road, against the flow of traffic. When there is no sidewalk, they are instructed to "stay as far to the left as possible".) Swanson was declared dead at Samaritan North Lincoln Hospital. His soccer ball was recovered from the scene of his death, but police do not believe he was dribbling it at the time. The driver remained on the scene and cooperated with police. He was found to have not been impaired. An eyewitness contacted the police three days later; motorists who witness crashes in Oregon are required by law to stop and call the police, but the Lincoln City Police said they would not press charges against her given her belated report.

Swanson was the first pedestrian killed by a vehicle in that section of Route 101 in at least six years. He was 270 miles (430 km) into his journey at the time of his death.

== Reactions and legacy ==
Many people responded to Swanson's death by commenting on his project's social media pages. His Facebook group went from 400 followers to 8,000 and received a large enough surge of comments that it was temporarily suspended. Some, including the musician Sting, left respectful condolences, while other online comments mocked or criticized Swanson or made light of the circumstances of his death. The columnists Arthur Black of Canada and Catón of Mexico, both of whom incorrectly described Swanson as having been dribbling at the time of his death, were moderately critical. Black included the incident in a list of cases on "the membrane between chutzpah and stupidity". Catón wrote that "It will be easier to inscribe the unfortunate death of Mr. Swanson in the book of curious facts than in that of heroic ones. Good intentions must be presided over by good sense, and prudence must always be the obligatory companion of benevolence."

Some suggested that the first play at the World Cup be played with Swanson's ball. There was some discussion of someone finishing his trip, or of sending his sons to the World Cup, but a Sports Illustrated article argued that this might not be necessary, and that Swanson would have been happy with the impact he had on his peers and those who followed his journey. Swanson's girlfriend told Powell of Grantland that he "was seeking something and he got it, and he found it for the two weeks before he died". Grantland concurred, writing, "Even after he died, perhaps especially after he died, some people—real people, normal people—felt inspired by what he had set out to do. Unmoored at midlife, Richard Swanson found his purpose on the road."

On May 19, 2013, the One World Futbol organization presented Swanson's sons a ball during halftime of a Seattle Sounders FC match. They also launched a page on their website where people could donate soccer balls to developing countries in Swanson's name. Chief operating officer Lisa Tarver said to the Associated Press, "We are deeply saddened to learn about Richard's death." Balls donated in honor of Swanson comprised some of the 5,300 given by One World Futbol and Chevrolet to communities in Brazil in advance of the World Cup.

A 2014 master's thesis on the topic of youth soccer is dedicated to "Richard Swanson, whose memory will live on with those who love the Beautiful Game and the game's power to transform lives". A journalist with The Register-Guard of Eugene, Oregon, recalled Swanson's death in 2015 while talking to a man on Route 101 who aimed to walk from Astoria, Oregon, to Mexico. The man said that he was not worried about sharing Swanson's fate and that he and his friend were walking with their backs to traffic because "we don't wanna see it comin'!"

== Investigation and trials ==
The 52-year-old man who drove the pickup truck that killed Swanson was arrested on June 17. Prior to this incident, he had numerous traffic-related violations according to Oregon court records, including giving false information to police, failing to drive on the right side of the road, speeding, and driving uninsured. His license had been suspended twice before. At arraignment, the driver appeared with a portable oxygen tank and said that he was receiving hospice care. He was released on June 18, over the objections of the district attorney, on the condition of surrendering his driver's license and not operating a motor vehicle.

The truck's driver was charged with criminally negligent homicide. His first trial in January 2014 resulted in a hung jury. Shortly before his second trial, the driver requested a postponement so that he could hire a new attorney, but the judge denied the request and the Oregon Supreme Court declined to overturn the denial, allowing the trial to begin as planned on November 18.

The driver's attorney argued that the collision was accidental, that the investigation was flawed, and that it was unclear where Swanson had been in relation to the fog line. On November 21, the jury found the driver not guilty. He attempted to apologize to Swanson's family in court, later telling The Oregonian, "I was right there with him trying to do [what] I could when this happened. Him dying was the last thing I ever wanted." Swanson's ex-wife was unmoved and called the verdict "a slap on the wrist".
