= La Antorcha de la Amistad =

Sculpture by Sebastián in San Antonio, Texas

Coordinates: 29.4234°N 98.4874°W

- Artist: Sebastián
- Location: San Antonio, Texas, U.S.

La Antorcha de la Amistad (Spanish for "The Torch of Friendship") is a monumental abstract sculpture by Mexican sculptor Sebastián, installed in Downtown San Antonio, in the U.S. state of Texas. The work was commissioned by a group of Mexican businessmen living in the United States and friends of Mexico, and presented as a gift from the Mexican government to the City of San Antonio in 2002. It was unveiled on June 27, 2002, by the artist, Mayor Edward D. Garza, and then–Secretary of Foreign Affairs for Mexico and political analyst Jorge Castañeda Gutman.

== Description ==
The sculpture stands at nearly 65 ft (20 m), and weighs more than 45 tons (40,800 kg). The medium is enameled iron. It is located in the middle of a traffic rotary (the intersection of Losoya, Commerce, Market, and Alamo Streets) in Downtown San Antonio, an area known to international tourists as the location for the San Antonio River Walk (or Paseo del Rio), and the Alamo.

== History ==
The group that commissioned it, the Asociación de Empresarios Mexicanos, a Texas non-profit composed of Mexican-American business owners and professionals, worked with the Mexican Consulate and the City of San Antonio to make the sculpture a symbol of cooperation and shared culture between the country and the city.

== Formal aspects and symbolism ==
The sculpture has two posts that rise at non-parallel angles. The posts appear to rise straightly until they individually curl and twist before meeting at the highest point of the sculpture. The sculpture is lit constantly, and with varying colors and light patterns at different periods of the year. The sculpture is geometric but does not seem to form any strictly right angles. From each angle surrounding the sculpture, the shape at the top appears to be from a different sculpture. Due to the location, the one perspective that is often inaccessible is that right under the sculpture, as it is located on a rotary island in a busy traffic intersection.

The artist himself describes the concepts of the sculpture a torch rising from the ground, and as a symbolization of two different actors—the United States of America and Mexico—running together:

He said the sculpture has many points of view from many angles, which is how he sees the two nations' relationship. "Sometimes it is complex. Sometimes it is harmonious," he said. "But the two countries are always close and always with a complex friendship. That's what I am trying to express with this combination of forms."

The comments of the artist and the chief organizer of the commissioning of this work, Alejandro Quiroz, make the meaning of the sculpture as a symbol of international bi-lateral relations complex. In an interview with Quiroz conducted by one of the authors of this article, he says that the sculpture symbolizes "... the two columns signify two countries, two languages, two cultures." that oversaw the political project to get the sculpture to its current site initially searched for a location in HemisFair Park, a public green space built during the HemisFair world fair of 1968. The park is surrounded by a large convention center, the Tower of the Americas, the Federal Building, and the Federal Courthouse.

The Asociación de Empresarios Mexicanos chose the traffic island that was previously empty at the intersection of Losoya, Alamo, and Commerce streets. Quiroz inquired about the site's history and found that according to many it was where the prisoners captured during the Battle of the Alamo were executed. The site was then chosen, but was not settled without some debate.

Though many of the large public sculptures by Sebastián provoke mixed reactions, as he claims, a particular controversy arose regarding the sculpture's location. Public art and architecture in Downtown San Antonio are strictly controlled. At the time of its erection in San Antonio, citizens made complaints to the City Council about its clash with the surrounding features. Nearby the site are the Alamo (not in view), the Henry B. Gonzalez Convention Center in modern brick, two non-uniform mall buildings, and the green tree tops that are based on the Paseo del Rio. The City Council sneaked by approval of the site within a week before the dedication. Controversy subsided as the sculpture proceeded to receive kind reviews, and it turned out that tax money for maintenance of the work would not be high (around $5,000).
