= Sábado de mierda =

- Directed by: Gregorio Rocha
- Starring: Rafa Punk
- Release date: 1988
- Running time: 25 minutes
- Country: Mexico
- Language: Spanish

Sábado de mierda ("Saturday of Shit") is a 1988 Mexican film by Gregorio Rocha and his then-partner Sarah Minter, shot between 1985 and 1987. The film is one of four independent films of the 1985–1991 period focusing on the lives of punk gangs in the Ciudad Nezahualcóyotl ("Neza York") suburb of Mexico City. The specific gang was a group known as Mierdas Punks ("Shit Punks"), who were also featured in the documentaries Nadie es inocente (also by Minter), and La neta no hay futuro by Andrea Gentile. The film is classified as a semi-documentary.
