= Arcos del Milenio =

Sculpture in Guadalajara, Jalisco, Mexico

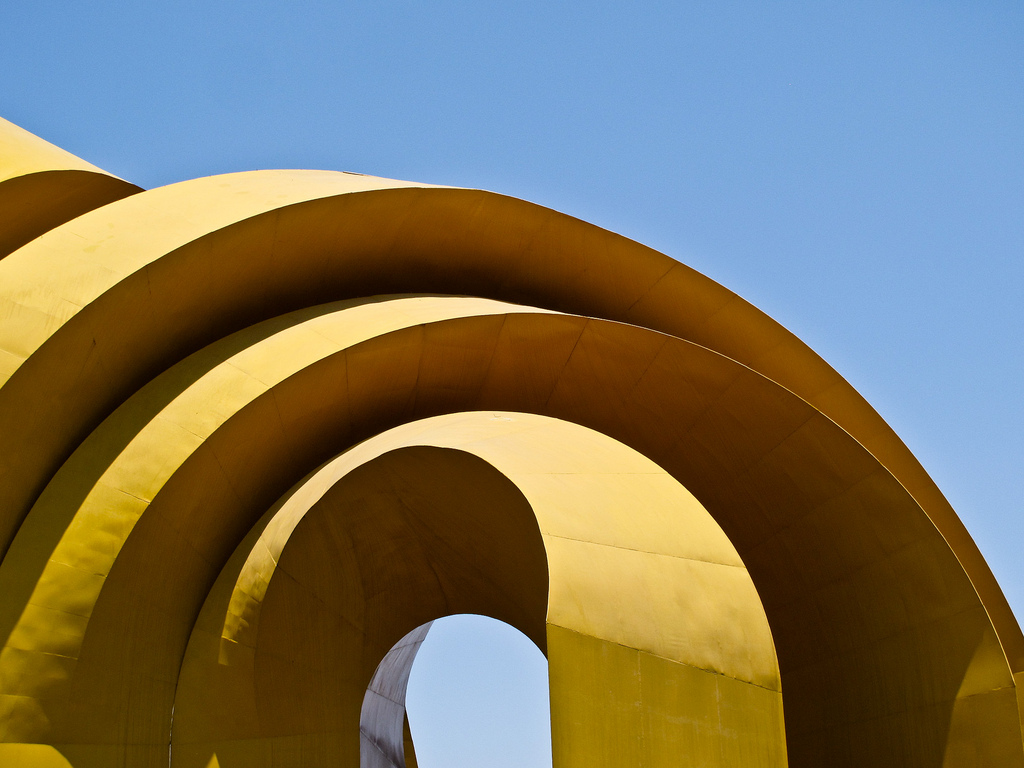
- The sculpture in 2011
- Artist: Sebastián
- Medium: Metal
- Dimensions: 52 m (171 ft)
- Weight: 1,500 t
- Location: Guadalajara, Jalisco, Mexico; 20°39′33″N 103°23′2″W

The Arcos del Milenio (transl. Millennium Arches), officially the Arcos del Tercer Milenio (transl. Third Millennium Arches), is a sculpture by Sebastián, installed in Guadalajara, Jalisco, Mexico. It is located along Avenues Mariano Otero and Lázaro Cárdenas. It is 52 meters (171 ft) high, weights around 1,500 metric tons (1,500 long tons; 1,700 short tons) and it covers 1,700 square meters (18,000 sq ft).

It was approved in 1999 by Francisco Javier Ramírez Acuña, the then-municipal president. The artwork is incomplete, as it only has placed four out of six arches. The first three arches were placed between 2000 and 2001, while the fourth one in 2005. Due to budget constraints and public opposition, the municipality will not continue paying for its conclusion. Sebastián has asked some private corporations to complete it. A miniature replica of the full planned monument was built at a park in the nearby town of Tapalpa.

The arches are commonly graffitied.

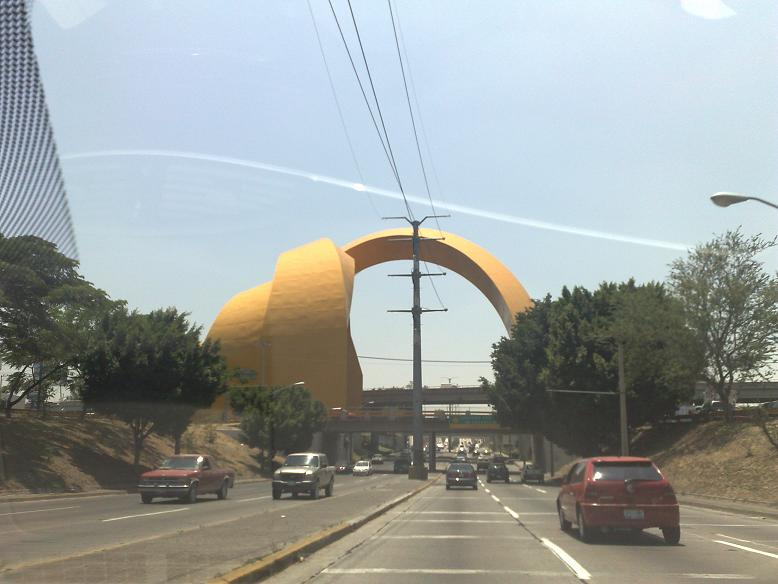

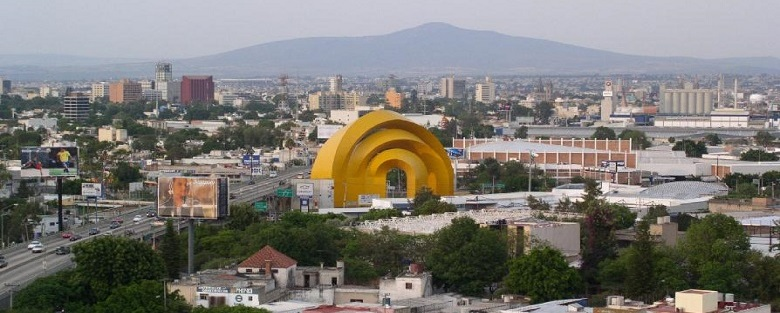
