= Coyote en Ayuno =

Sculpture in Nezahualcóyotl, Mexico

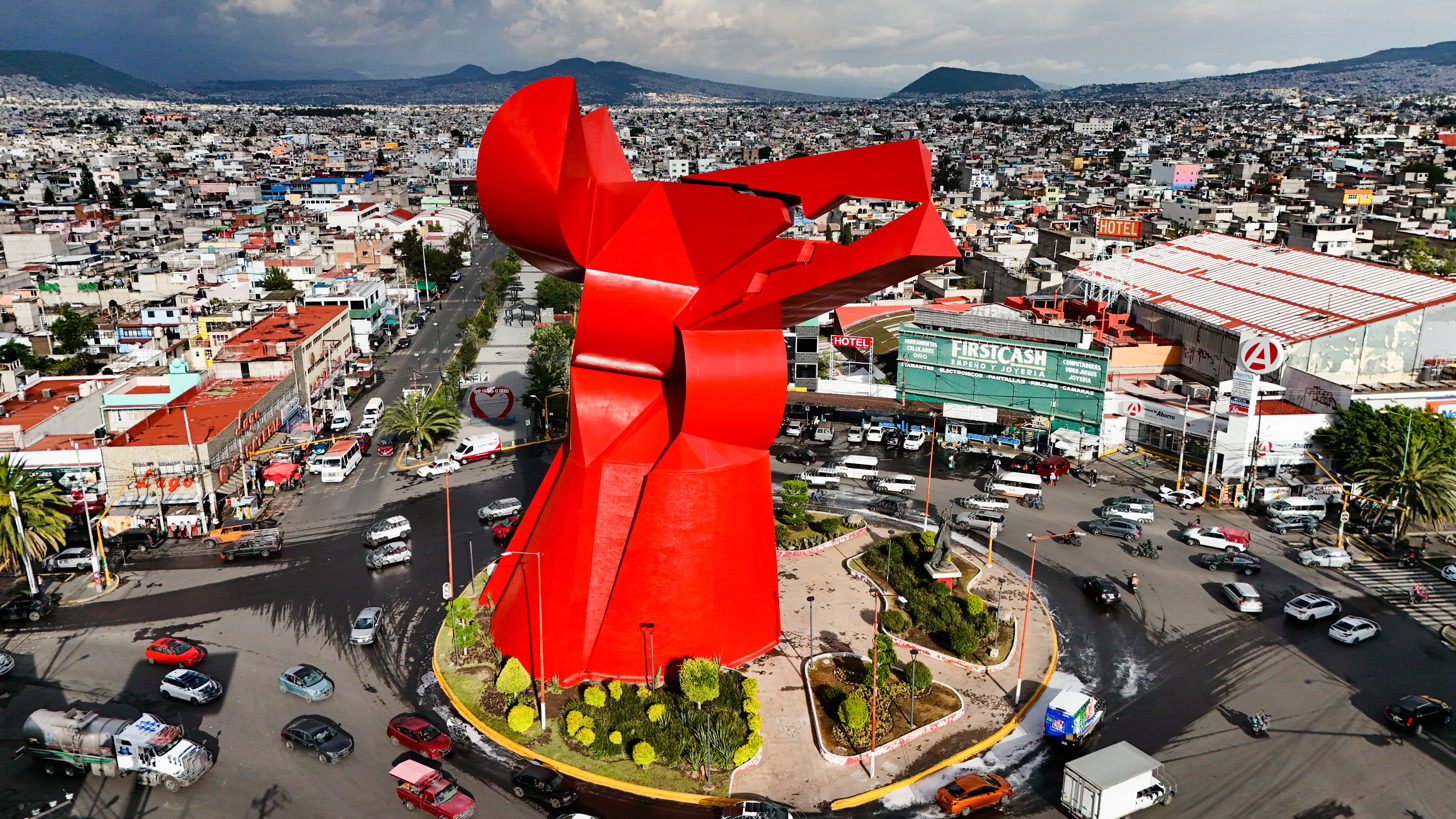
- The sculpture in 2026
- Location
- Artist: Sebastián
- Year: 2008
- Medium: Steel
- Dimensions: 40 m (130 ft)
- Weight: 300 t (300 long tons; 330 short tons)
- Location: Ciudad Nezahualcóyotl; 19°24′00″N 99°01′44″W

Coyote en Ayuno ("Fasting Coyote"), also known as Coyote Hambriento ("Hungry Coyote") and Cabeza de Coyote ("Coyote Head"), is an outdoor steel sculpture by abstract monumental artist Enrique "Sebastián" Carbajal, installed on a roundabout in the intersection of Adolfo López Mateos Avenue and Pantitlán Avenue, in the municipality of Nezahualcóyotl, State of Mexico. The sculpture, which depicts a red coyote looking skyward, was inaugurated on 23 April 2008 to celebrate the 45th anniversary of the founding of the municipality. The name of the sculpture references the etymology of Nezahualcóyotl.

== History and description ==
The complex (which includes the sculpture Coyote en Ayuno and its plinth) is 40 meters (130 ft) tall and 21 meters (69 ft) wide. It features a red-painted steel coyote looking skyward. It was created by Enrique "Sebastián" Carbajal. The sculpture weighs around 300 metric tons (300 long tons; 330 short tons) and it was placed on a 21 meters (69 ft)-tall concrete pedestal. It was installed on a roundabout between Adolfo López Mateos Avenue and Pantitlán Avenue, in Ciudad Nezahualcóyotl, State of Mexico, where previously a water tank had been. Due to its height and color, the sculpture can be seen throughout Nezahualcóyotl.

The sculpture was commissioned to Sebastián by the then-mayor of Nezahualcóyotl, Luis Sánchez Jiménez, with a budget of 2 million pesos, and it was to be completed within a year. The cost soared to 5 million pesos and was completed in three years. The Coyote en Ayuno was inaugurated on 23 April 2008 to celebrate the 45th anniversary of the founding of the municipality. According to Sebastián, the eyes face east, so that the first ray of sunlight on 23 April can cross through the eye socket and light is projected onto a commemorative plaque, like a pre-Hispanic ritual. At the time it was inaugurated, the sculpture became the tallest of the country.

In addition, the original project included a space to create a cultural center and a museum, but it did not materialize. By 2018, there were plans to rehabilitate the sculpture and place a museum, but it did not happen due to a lack of budget.

== Reception ==
Like most of Sebastián's works, Coyote en Ayuno received mixed reactions to the artist's style. Many locals at first considered it ugly and disproportionate but later it became a landmark of the municipality.

== See also ==
- Guerrero Chimalli, another sculpture by Sebastián in the neighboring municipality of Chimalhuacán.
