= La X (sculpture) =

Sculpture in Juárez, Mexico

Monumento a la Mexicanidad
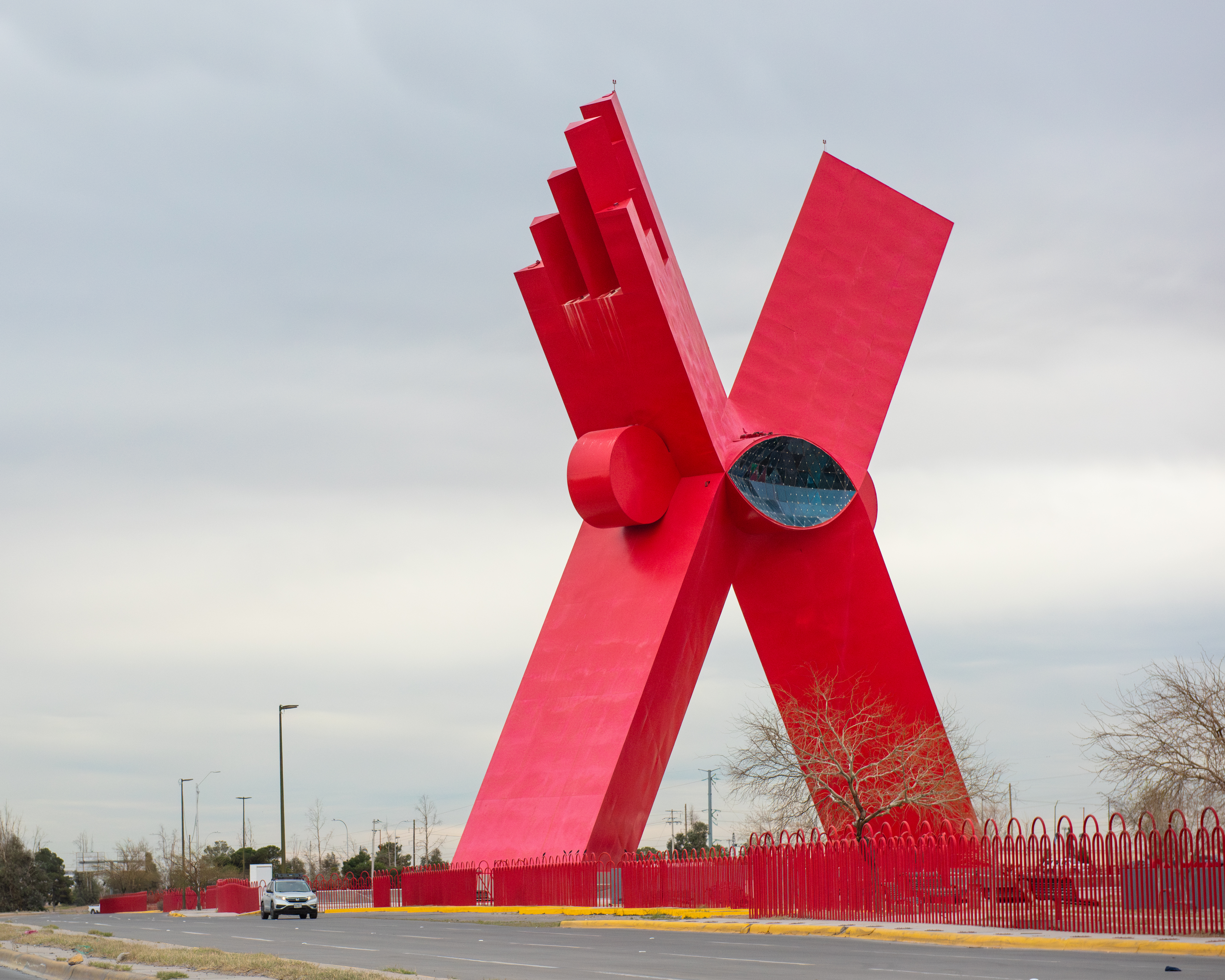
- The sculpture in 2024
- Location
- Artist: Sebastián
- Year: 24 May 2013
- Medium: Steel
- Dimensions: 64 m (210 ft)
- Weight: 800 t (790 long tons; 880 short tons)
- Location: Ciudad Juárez; 31°45′25″N 106°26′27″W

Monumento a la Mexicanidad ("Monument to Mexican Identity"), commonly referred to as La X or La Equis, is an outdoor steel monument by Enrique "Sebastián" Carbajal, installed in Ciudad Juárez, Chihuahua, near the Mexico–United States border.

It is a 64-meter (210 ft) steel artwork that depicts a letter "X". In the middle, there is an observation deck. It was inaugurated on 24 May 2013. The monument has multiple symbols associated to Mexican identity.

== History and description ==
The Monumento a la Mexicanidad, also referred to as La X or La Equis, is an artwork by the Mexican sculptor Enrique "Sebastián" Carbajal. It is a 64-meter (210 ft) tall monument, built in the shape of a red letter "X". One of its upper ends is intentionally left incomplete, which, as Sebastián explained, symbolizes the never-ending task of improving Ciudad Juárez and Mexico.

In the center of the Monumento a la Mexicanidad there is an observation deck, that, when viewed from the outside, is shaped like an eye. The monument weighs approximately 800 metric tons (790 long tons; 880 short tons). For Sebastián, the letter X in the monument represents the mestizaje process in Mexico.

The monument was opened on 24 May 2013 in Ciudad Juárez, Chihuahua, a city at the Mexico–United States border near El Paso, Texas. It received restoration works in 2020 and 2024.

== See also ==
- Mexicayotl, a movement that aims to revive the Indigenous religion, philosophy and traditions of ancient Mexico
