= Robert Andrew Powell =

American journalist and author

Robert Andrew Powell is an American journalist and author. He is best known for his writing on sports and food. His sports journalism was included in The Best American Sports Writing, in 1998. He won a James Beard Foundation Award, in 1997, in the "Newspaper Feature Writing without Recipes" category.

Powell has written for many publications, including The New York Times, Slate, and Mother Jones. He was a long-time contributor to Miami New Times.

== Books ==
He is the author of three books. His first, We Own This Game: A Season in the Adult World of Youth Football, examined the culture of Pop Warner football in Miami, Florida. It was a Sports Illustrated Best Book of the Year, in 2003. Kirkus Reviews praised its "visceral and direct style." Steve Almond, writing in Salon, called it "compulsively readable, precisely because it focuses on the very parts of Miami that tourists will never see, the vast, desperate ghettos where athletic success has become, for all intents and purposes, the only path to the American dream."

This Love Is Not For Cowards: Salvation and Soccer in Ciudad Juárez, Powell's second book, also received strong reviews. ESPN called it "brutally honest" and "a comprehensive picture of Juarez." The Boston Globe considered it a "clear-eyed and humane book [that] has succeeded in introducing [its] readers to a truth behind the grim and monotonous headlines."

== Bibliography ==
- We Own This Game: A Season in the Adult World of Youth Football (2003)
- This Love Is Not for Cowards: Salvation and Soccer in Ciudad Juárez (2012)
- Running Away (2014)
