= 1994–95 Club Necaxa season =

Club Necaxa
1994-95 season
- Owner: Televisa
- President: Enrique Borja
- Manager: Manuel Lapuente
- Stadium: Azteca
- Primera Division: 4th Winners (in 1996 CONCACAF Champions' Cup)
- Copa Mexico: Winners
- Top goalscorer: Ivo Basay (15 goals)
Home colours	Away colours
- All statistics correct as of 27 January 2019.

The 1994–95 Club Necaxa season is the 12th consecutive season in the top flight division of Mexican football.

== Summary ==
In summertime President Enrique Borja appointed Manuel Lapuente as new head coach and reinforced the squad with the transfers in of defenders Eduardo Vilches, Octavio Becerril and Jose Maria Higareda. Also, the arrival of Forward Luis Hernandez He is widely regarded as one of Mexico's most talented strikers. from CF Monterrey was crutial for the success in the upcoming season. Lapuente was known as manager thanks to clinching two league trophies with Puebla FC (1983 and 1990).

The team made a decent league tournament finished on 4th spot classifying to the post-season and defeating incumbent Champion Tecos UAG in a two leg series. Then in semifinals, the squad defeated regular season leader and heavy-favourites to the title CD Guadalajara after two matches. The club advanced to the final against Cruz Azul winning the trophy league with a global score of 3-1.

Also, in Copa Mexico the squad clinched the title after winning the final 2-0 against Veracruz reaching The Double for the first time ever.

== Squad ==
Note: Flags indicate national team as defined under FIFA eligibility rules; some limited exceptions apply. Players may hold more than one non-FIFA nationality.

No.	Pos.	Nation	Player
1	GK	MEX	Nicolás Navarro
2	DF	MEX	Carlos López
3	DF	CHI	Eduardo Vilches
4	DF	MEX	Ignacio Ambriz
5	MF	MEX	Marcial Mendoza
6	MF	MEX	Manuel Sol
7	MF	ECU	Alex Aguinaga
8	MF	MEX	Alberto García Aspe
9	FW	MEX	Ricardo Peláez
10	DF	MEX	Efraín Herrera
11	FW	CHI	Ivo Basay

No.	Pos.	Nation	Player
12	FW	MEX	Luis Hernández
13	DF	MEX	Víctor Escalera
14	DF	MEX	Gerardo Esquivel
15	DF	MEX	Octavio Becerril
16	MF	MEX	Julio C. Aldana
19	GK	MEX	Raúl Orvañanos
20	DF	MEX	José María Higareda
21	MF	MEX	René Fuentes Montoya
25	FW	ARG	Sergio Zárate
26	DF	USA	Dominic Kinnear
31	FW	MEX	Edson Alvarado
33	MF	MEX	Salvador Cabrera

=== Transfers ===
In
Pos.	Name	from	Type
FW	Luis Hernandez	CF Monterrey	
FW	Ivo Basay	Boca Juniors	loan ended
DF	Octavio Becerril	Veracruz	
DF	Eduardo Vilches	Colo-Colo	
DF	Jose Maria Higareda	Leones Negros UdeG	
MF	Manuel Sol	Pumas UNAM	
MF	Victor Escalera	Zacatepec	

Out
Pos.	Name	To	Type
DF	Abraham Nava	CF Monterrey	
DF	Paco Ramírez	Veracruz	

==== Winter ====
In
Pos.	Name	from	Type
DF	Dominic Kinnear		
FW	Sergio Zárate	Hamburger SV	

Out
Pos.	Name	To	Type

== Competitions ==
=== La Liga ===
==== League table ====
===== Group 1 =====
Pos	Team	Pld	W	D	L	GF	GA	GD	Pts	Qualification
1	América	36	19	13	4	88	46	+42	51	Playoff
2	Necaxa	36	16	14	6	69	38	+31	46	Playoff
3	Tecos	36	14	14	8	50	47	+3	42	Playoff
4	Toros Neza	36	12	8	16	55	62	−7	32	
5	UANL	36	7	10	19	34	50	−16	24	

===== General table =====
Pos	Team	Pld	W	D	L	GF	GA	GD	Pts	Qualification
2	America	36	19	13	4	88	46	+42	51	Qualification for the quarter-finals (Note: The first four places in the table and teams ranked 6th and 8th qualified for the Liguilla quarter-finals.)
3	Cruz Azul	36	20	8	8	91	45	+46	48	Qualification for the quarter-finals
4	Necaxa	36	16	14	6	69	38	+31	46	Qualification for the quarter-finals
5	UAG (C)	36	14	14	8	50	47	+3	42	Qualification for the Repechaje (Note: Teams ranked 5th, 7th, 9th and 11th in the table qualified for Repechaje)
6	UNAM	36	15	11	10	49	36	+13	41	Qualification for the quarter-finals

Source: Liga MX
Rules for classification: 1) Points; 2) Goal difference; 3) Number of goals scored; 4) Head-to-head results between tied teams; 5) Number of goals scored away; 6) Highest relegation coefficient; 7) Fair Play points
(C) Champions

===== Results by round =====
Round	1	2	3	4	5	6	7	8	9	10	11	12	13	14	15	16	17	18	19	20	21	22	23	24	25	26	27	28	29	30	31	32	33	34	35	36	37	38
Ground	A	H	A	H	A	H	A	H	A	H	A	H	H	A	H	A	H	A	H	H	A	H	A	H	A	H	A	H	A	H	A	A	H	A	H	A	H	A
Result	W	W	D	W	W	W	W	D	D	W	L	W	D	D	-	W	W	W	D	L	W	W	W	D	D	D	D	D	W	W	D	L	L	-	L	D	D	L
Position	1	1	1	1	1	1	1	1	1	1	2	1	1	1	2	2	2	1	1	2	2	2	1	2	2	2	2	2	2	1	1	2	2	3	3	3	4	4

Source: Competitive matches
A = Away; H = Home; W = Win; D = Draw; L = Loss; P = Postponed; = Leader, Qualification for the quarter-finals; C = Qualification for the quarter-finals as group leader.; E = Qualification for the quarter-finals as group runner-up.; R = Qualification for the Repechaje.

==== Matches ====
4 September 1994 1	Puebla FC	0-4	Necaxa	Puebla de los Angeles
			25' Pelaez; 53' Alex Aguinaga; 63' José María Higareda; 78' Pelaez	Stadium: Cuauhtemoc

9 September 1994 2	Necaxa	1-0	CD Toluca	Tlalpan
	José María Higareda 44'			Stadium: Azteca

17 September 1994 3	CF Monterrey	1-1	Necaxa	Monterrey
	Verdirame 45' (pen.)		9' (pen.) Aspe	Stadium: Tecnológico

24 September 1994 4	Necaxa	1-0	Leon	Tlalpan
	Víctor Escalera 39'			Stadium: Azteca

1 October 1994 5	Atlas FC	0-3	Necaxa	Guadalajara
			47'Aspe; 56' Higareda; 89' Basay	Stadium: Jalisco

8 October 1994 6	Necaxa	2-1	Tecos UAG	Tlalpan
	Sol 42'; Luis Hernández 90'		64' Hugo Aparecido	Stadium: Azteca

16 October 1994 7	Santos Laguna	0-2	Necaxa	Torreon
			55' Aspe; 81' Luis Hernández	Stadium: Corona

23 October 1994 8	Necaxa	0-0	Cruz Azul	Tlalpan
				Stadium: Azteca

30 October 1994 9	Atlético Morelia	0-0	Necaxa	Morelia
				Stadium: Morelos

6 November 1994 10	Necaxa	7-0	Atlante FC	Tlalpan
	Luis Hernández 9', 66', 89'; Basay 50', 53'; José María Higareda 59'; Aspe 70' (pen.)			Stadium: Azteca

13 November 1994 11	Correcaminos UAT	2-0	Necaxa	Ciudad Victoria
	Nildeson Silva 27', 86'			Stadium: Marte R.Gomez

19 November 1994 12	Necaxa	1-0	Tigres UANL	Tlalpan
	Cecilio de los Santos 84' (o.g.)			Stadium: Azteca

27 November 1994 13	Toros Neza	1-1	Necaxa	Ciudad Nezahualcoyotl
	Jaime Ramírez 76'		87' (pen.) Aguinaga	Stadium: Neza 86

7 December 1994 14	Necaxa	1-1	CD Guadalajara	Tlalpan
	Luis Hernández 49'		24' Alberto Guameru García	Stadium: Azteca

14 December 1994 15	Leones Negros UdeG	bye	Necaxa	Guadalajara
				Stadium: Jalisco

11 December 1994 16	Necaxa	2-0	Veracruz	Tlalpan
	Basay 55', 67'			Stadium: Azteca

18 December 1994 17	America	1-2	Necaxa	Tlalpan
	Zague 30'		8', 19' Basay	Stadium: Azteca

22 December 1994 18	Necaxa	2-1	Pumas UNAM	Tlalpan
	Luis Hernández 57'; Aspe 67' (pen.)		59' Juan Carreño	Stadium: Azteca

29 December 1994 19	TM Gallos Blancos	2-2	Necaxa	Queretaro
	René Mendieta 9'; Héctor del Ángel 24'		50' Alberto García Aspe; 73' Luis Hernández	Stadium: Corregidora

6 January 1995 20	Necaxa	1-2	Puebla FC	Tlalpan
	Ricardo Peláez 53'		13' (pen.) Milton Queiroz "Tita"; 42' Rodrigo Ruiz	Stadium: Azteca

18 January 1995 21	CD Toluca	1-2	Necaxa	Toluca
	Alberto Macías 17'		52' Ricardo Peláez; 79' Ivo Basay	Stadium: La Bombonera

23 January 1995 22	Necaxa	6-0	Monterrey	Tlalpan
	Ricardo Peláez 28', 73', 86'; Ivo Basay 67'; Sergio Zárate 80'; Alex Aguinaga 82'			Stadium: Azteca

29 January 1995 23	León	0-4	Necaxa	Leon de los Aldama
			21'Alberto García Aspe; 75'Ricardo Peláez; 82', 88' Ivo Basay	Stadium: Nou Camp

4 February 1995 24	Necaxa	2-2	Atlas FC	Tlalpan
	Alberto García Aspe 68', 71' (pen.)		33' Héctor López; 44' Jared Borguetti	Stadium: Azteca

10 February 1995 25	Tecos UAG	1-1	Necaxa	Zapopan
	Rizo 32'		71' Basay	Stadium: 3 de Marzo

18 February 1995 26	Club Necaxa	1-1	Santos Laguna	Tlalpan
	Gerardo Esquivel 40'		27' Héctor Adomaitis	Stadium: Azteca

25 February 1995 27	Cruz Azul	1-1	Necaxa	Tlalpan]
	Octavio Mora 89'		65' Alberto García Aspe	Stadium: Azteca

4 March 1995 28	Club Necaxa	2-2	Atlético Morelia	Tlalpan
	Dominic Kinnear 36'; Sergio Zárate 58'		27' Héctor González; 30' Roberto Hernández	Stadium: Azteca

12 March 1995 29	Atlante FC	0-3	Necaxa
			Alex Aguinaga 24, 67, Alberto García Aspe 54

18 March 1995 30	Necaxa	5-1	Correcaminos UAT	Tlalpan
	Ricardo Peláez 51', 60', 81'; Ivo Basay 54', 71'		38' Sergio Almaguer	Stadium: Azteca

25 March 1995 31	Tigres UANL	1-1	Necaxa	San Nicolas de los Garza
	Israel García 80'		60' Sergio Zárate	Stadium: Universitario

1 April 1995 32	Necaxa	1-3	Toros Neza	Tlalpan
	Alex Aguinaga 68'		3' Genaro Torres; 48' Juan Carlos Elizalde; 72' Martín Vilallonga	Stadium: Azteca

6 April 1995 33	CD Guadalajara	4-0	Necaxa	Guadalajara
	Omar Arellano 24'; Espinosa 35'; Ramón Ramírez 68'; Jorge Arreola 75'			Stadium: Jalisco

13 April 1995 34	Necaxa	bye	Leones Negros UdeG	Tlalpan
				Stadium: Azteca

15 April 1995 35	Tiburones Rojos de Veracruz	1-0	Necaxa	Veracruz
	Leonel Bolsonello 36'			Stadium: Pirata Fuente

23 April 1995 36	Necaxa	4-4	América	Coyoacan
	Ivo Basay 11'; Ricardo Peláez 50', 56'; Aspe 78' (pen.)		27' (pen.), 68' Francois-Omam Biyik; 44', 72' Luis García	Stadium: Azteca

30 April 1995 37	Pumas UNAM	1-1	Necaxa	Tlalpan
	Claudio Suárez 24'		53' Pelaez	Stadium: Olimpico Universitario

7 May 1995 38	Necaxa	2-3	TM Gallos Blancos	Tlalpan
	Sergio Zárate 53'; Efraín Herrera 84'		24' Gerardo Silva; 32', 60' René Mendieta	Stadium: Azteca

===== Quarterfinals =====
18 May 1995	Tecos UAG	0-2	Necaxa	Zapopan
20:30			Basay 32'; Aspe 81'	Stadium: 3 de Marzo

21 May 1995	Necaxa	2-1	Tecos UAG	Tlalpan
12:00	Ambríz 57'; Higareda 87'		Malibrán 74'	Stadium: Azteca

=== Copa Mexico ===
==== First round ====
26 January 1995	Pachuca FC	1-1 (4-5 p)	Necaxa	Pachuca
	Esquivel 73' (o.g.)		74' Hernandez	Stadium: Hidalgo

==== Semifinals ====
15 February 1995	Necaxa	2-2 (4-3 p)	America	Tlalpan
20:45 CEST	Ambriz 5'; Basay 46'		2' Francois-Omam Biyik; 89' Kalusha	Stadium: Azteca

==== Final ====
15 March 1995	Necaxa	2-0	Veracruz	Puebla de los Angeles
	Pelaez 11'; Pelaez 15'			Stadium: Cuauhtemoc

== Statistics ==
=== Players statistics ===
No.	Pos	Nat	Player	Total		Primera Division		1994-95 Copa Mexico	
No.	Pos	Nat	Player	Apps	Goals	Apps	Goals	Apps	Goals
1	GK	(Mexico) MEX	Nicolás Navarro	34	-33	34	-33		
3	DF	(Chile) CHI	Eduardo Vilches	32	0	32	0		
4	DF	(Mexico) MEX	Ignacio Ambriz	31	0	31	0		
15	DF	(Mexico) MEX	Octavio Becerril	31	0	29+2	0		
20	DF	(Mexico) MEX	José María Higareda	34	4	34	4		
8	MF	(Mexico) MEX	Alberto García Aspe	32	12	32	12		
14	MF	(Mexico) MEX	Gerardo Esquivel	33	1	31+2	1		
7	MF	(Ecuador) ECU	Alex Aguinaga	34	6	34	6		
12	FW	(Mexico) MEX	Luis Hernández	32	8	31+1	8		
9	FW	(Mexico) MEX	Ricardo Peláez	34	14	34	14		
11	FW	(Chile) CHI	Ivo Basay	32	15	31+1	15		
19	GK	(Mexico) MEX	Raúl Orvañanos	2	-5	2	-5		
6	MF	(Mexico) MEX	Manuel Sol	18	1	13+5	1		
25	FW	(Argentina) ARG	Sergio Zárate	17	4	13+4	4		
5	MF	(Mexico) MEX	Marcial Mendoza	12	0	9+3	0		
10	DF	(Mexico) MEX	Efraín Herrera	9	1	6+3	1		
33	MF	(Mexico) MEX	Salvador Cabrera	4	0	4	0		
26	MF	(United States) USA	Dominic Kinnear	5	1	3+2	1		
31	FW	(Mexico) MEX	Edson Alvarado	18	0	1+17	0		
2	DF	(Mexico) MEX	Carlos López	5	0	1+4	0		
21	MF	(Mexico) MEX	René Fuentes Montoya	3	0	1+2	0		
13	DF	(Mexico) MEX	Víctor Escalera	1	1	1	1		
16	MF	(Mexico) MEX	Julio C. Aldana	1	0	0+1	0		

- Source: http://yalma.fime.uanl.mx/~futmx/MFL/Mex95/News/norte29my95b.html
