= 1994–95 C.D. Veracruz season =

Veracruz
1994-95 season
- Owner: State of Veracruz (75%)
- Manager: Anibal Ruiz
- Stadium: Pirata Fuente
- Primera Division: 9th Repechaje
- Copa Mexico: Runner-up
| Home colours | Away colours |
- All statistics correct as of 27 January 2019.

The 1994–95 C.D. Veracruz season is the 51st campaign in existence and 6th consecutive season in the top flight division of Mexican football.

== Summary ==
In summertime the club sold several players due to the Mexican peso crisis included midfielder Joaquin del Olmo to America, Picas Becerril to Necaxa, midfielder Ruben Omar Romano returned to Atlante FC, and Argentine Forward Jorge Comas. On the contrary, the arrivals were not promising: Brazilian Forward Leonel Bolsonello, goalkeeper Bautista from Pumas UNAM, Jose Luis Malibran from Toros Neza, Brazilian Forward Marquinho and defender Paco Ramirez from Necaxa. In his second year as head coach Anibal Ruiz finished in a decent 9th spot on mid-table, thanks to a mediocre group with Atlante FC and Morelia the squad qualified to post-season repechaje round. The playing of the squad was aimed by goalkeeper Adolfo Rios and the defensive line with Paco Ramirez and Jose Luis Gonzalez China saving several points in favor, meanwhile the offensive line had a poor performance with Bolsonello being a major flop.

In repechaje, the team was defeated by regional rivals Puebla FC after a two leg series.

Finally, the squad reached the 1994-95 Copa Mexico Final losing the trophy against Necaxa with a 0–2 score.

After the new Federal government arrived in December 1994 with President Ernesto Zedillo, former Secretariat of the Interior and Veracruz native Fernando Gutierrez Barrios linked to ex-President Carlos Salinas de Gortari along the minority of shareholders of the club were attempting to sell the club during the campaign and, in June 1995, concluded the sale to TV Azteca which bought the 75% of shares from State Government. It was the end of an era in the club beginning in 1989 when State Government, Gutierrez Barrios and minority private partners acquired the franchise of Potros Neza and moved it to Veracruz.

== Squad ==
Note: Flags indicate national team as defined under FIFA eligibility rules; some limited exceptions apply. Players may hold more than one non-FIFA nationality.

| No. | Pos. | Nation | Player |
|---|---|---|---|
| — | GK | MEX | Adolfo Rios |
| — | DF | MEX | Alberto Duran |
| — | DF | MEX | Pedro Osorio |
| — | FW | CHI | Carlos Poblete |
| — | DF | MEX | Jose Marroquin |
| — | DF | MEX | Ricardo Munguia |
| — | DF | MEX | Jose Luis Gonzalez China |
| — | MF | MEX | Martin Yamasaki |
| — | MF | MEX | Paco Ramirez |
| — | MF | MEX | Sergio Bueno |
| — | MF | BRA | Marquinho |

| No. | Pos. | Nation | Player |
|---|---|---|---|
| — | MF | BRA | Leonel Bolsonello |
| — | MF | MEX | Jose Luis Malibran |
| — | GK | MEX | Rafael Calderon |
| — | DF | MEX | Pascual Ramirez |
| — | MF | MEX | Victor Medina |
| — | MF | MEX | Enrique Figueroa |
| — | FW | ARG | Diego Bustos |

=== Transfers ===
In
| Pos. | Name | from | Type |
|---|---|---|---|
| FW | Leonel Bolsonello | Pumas UNAM | loan |
| GK | Rafael Calderon | Pumas UNAM | |
| DF | Paco Ramirez | Necaxa | |
| MF | Sergio Bueno | Queretaro FC | |
| FW | Marquinho | Leon | |
| MF | Jose Luis Malibran | Toros Neza | |

Out
| Pos. | Name | To | Type |
|---|---|---|---|
| FW | Jorge Comas | Colon de Santa Fe | |
| MF | Joaquin del Olmo | America | |
| DF | Octavio Becerril | Necaxa | |
| MF | Hector Quintero | Tampico Madero | |
| MF | Marco Diaz Avalos | Atlante FC | |
| MF | Ruben Omar Romano | Atlante FC | |

==== Winter ====
In
| Pos. | Name | from | Type |

Out
| Pos. | Name | To | Type |

== Competitions ==
=== La Liga ===
==== League table ====
===== Group 1 =====
| Pos | Team | Pld | W | D | L | GF | GA | GD | Pts | Qualification or relegation |
|---|---|---|---|---|---|---|---|---|---|---|
| 1 | Cruz Azul | 36 | 20 | 8 | 8 | 91 | 45 | +46 | 48 | Playoff |
| 2 | Veracruz | 36 | 12 | 11 | 13 | 43 | 51 | −8 | 35 | Playoff |
| 3 | Atlante | 36 | 11 | 11 | 14 | 57 | 69 | −12 | 33 | |
| 4 | Morelia | 36 | 9 | 12 | 15 | 54 | 75 | −21 | 30 | |
| 5 | Correcaminos | 36 | 9 | 10 | 17 | 42 | 65 | −23 | 28 | Relegated |

===== Results by round =====
| Round | 1 | 2 | 3 | 4 | 5 | 6 | 7 | 8 | 9 | 10 | 11 | 12 | 13 | 14 | 15 | 16 | 17 | 18 | 19 | 20 | 21 | 22 | 23 | 24 | 25 | 26 | 27 | 28 | 29 | 30 | 31 | 32 | 33 | 34 | 35 | 36 | 37 | 38 |
|---|---|---|---|---|---|---|---|---|---|---|---|---|---|---|---|---|---|---|---|---|---|---|---|---|---|---|---|---|---|---|---|---|---|---|---|---|---|---|
| Ground | A | H | A | H | A | H | A | H | A | H | A | H | H | A | H | A | H | A | H | H | A | H | A | H | A | H | A | H | A | H | A | A | H | A | H | A | H | A |
| Result | W | W | L | L | D | W | L | W | W | L | - | D | D | W | D | L | W | D | W | D | L | D | L | D | W | L | W | L | L | - | L | D | D | D | W | W | L | L |
| Position | 6 | 2 | 3 | 9 | 11 | 5 | 9 | 5 | 3 | 6 | 7 | 7 | 6 | 6 | 6 | 7 | 5 | 7 | 6 | 6 | 6 | 5 | 6 | 7 | 5 | 8 | 6 | 8 | 8 | 8 | 9 | 8 | 8 | 9 | 8 | 8 | 8 | 9 |

Source: Competitive matches
A = Away; H = Home; W = Win; D = Draw; L = Loss; P = Postponed; = Leader, Qualification for the quarter-finals; C = Qualification for the quarter-finals as group leader.; E = Qualification for the quarter-finals as group runner-up.; R = Qualification for the Repechaje.

===== General table =====
| Pos | Team | Pld | W | D | L | GF | GA | GD | Pts | Qualification |
|---|---|---|---|---|---|---|---|---|---|---|
| 7 | Puebla | 36 | 12 | 16 | 8 | 45 | 41 | +4 | 40 | Qualification for the Repechaje (Note: Teams ranked 5th, 7th, 9th and 11th in the table qualified for Repechaje) |
| 8 | Santos Laguna | 36 | 13 | 9 | 14 | 61 | 62 | −1 | 35 | Qualification for the quarter-finals (Note: The first four places in the table and teams ranked 6th and 8th qualified for the Liguilla quarter-finals.) |
| 9 | Veracruz | 36 | 12 | 11 | 13 | 43 | 51 | −8 | 35 | Qualification for the Repechaje |
| 10 | Atlante | 36 | 11 | 11 | 14 | 57 | 69 | −12 | 33 | |
| 11 | Monterrey | 36 | 9 | 15 | 12 | 37 | 52 | −15 | 33 | Qualification for the Repechaje |

Source: Liga MX
Rules for classification: 1) Points; 2) Goal difference; 3) Number of goals scored; 4) Head-to-head results between tied teams; 5) Number of goals scored away; 6) Highest relegation coefficient; 7) Fair Play points

==== Matches ====
| 3 September 1994 1 | Atlas FC | 1-2 | Veracruz | Guadalajara |
| | Cristian Domizzi 17' | | 41' Mario Ramírez; 71' Poblete | Stadium: Jalisco |

| 10 September 1994 2 | Veracruz | 3-0 | Tecos UAG | Veracruz |
| | Carlos Poblete 39'; José Luis Malibrán 61'; Marco Antonio Benatto "Marquinho" 70' | | | Stadium: Pirata Fuente |

| 18 September 1994 3 | Santos Laguna | 3-2 | Veracruz | Torreon |
| | Miguel Asprilla 18'; Everaldo Bejines 49'; Adomaitis 85' (pen.) | | 69', 83' (pen.) José Luis González China | Stadium: Corona |

| 24 September 1994 4 | Veracruz | 0-4 | Cruz Azul | Veracruz |
| | | | 47', 65', 66', 68'Hermosillo | Stadium: Pirata Fuente |

| 2 October 1994 5 | Atlético Morelia | 0-0 | Veracruz | Morelia |
| | | | | Stadium: Morelos |

| 8 October 1994 6 | Veracruz | 1-0 | Atlante FC | Veracruz |
| | Poblete 73' | | | Stadium: Pirata Fuente |

| 16 October 1994 7 | Correcaminos UAT | 1-0 | Veracruz | Ciudad Victoria |
| | Carlos Orozco 72' | | | Stadium: Marte R.Gomez |

| 22 October 1994 8 | Veracruz | 3-0 | Tigres UANL | Veracruz |
| | Leonel Bolsonello 10', 77' (pen.); José Luis González China 32' | | | Stadium: Pirata Fuente |

| 30 October 1994 9 | Toros Neza | 2-3 | Veracruz | Ciudad Nezahualcoyotl |
| | Guillermo Vázquez 31' (pen.), 44' | | 82' Carlos Poblete; 85' José Luis González China; 89' Elías Ledesma | Stadium: Neza 86 |

| 5 November 1994 10 | Veracruz | 1-4 | CD Guadalajara | Veracruz |
| | José Luis González China 52' (pen.) | | 35'José Manuel de la Torre; 38' (o.g.) Pedro Pablo Osorio; 82' Ignacio Vázquez; 89' Alberto Coyote | Stadium: Pirata Fuente |

| 12 November 1994 11 | Leones Negros UdeG | bye | Veracruz | Guadalajara |
| | | | | Stadium: Jalisco |

| 19 November 1994 12 | Veracruz | 0-0 | Puebla FC | Veracruz |
| | | | | Stadium: Pirata Fuente |

| 26 November 1994 13 | Veracruz | 3-3 | America | Veracruz |
| | José Luis González China 35' (pen.); Pedro Pablo Osorio 72'; Elías Ledesma 78' | | Kalusha Bwalya 41', Francois-Omam Biyik 59', Luis Roberto Alves "Zague" 66' | Stadium: Pirata Fuente |

| 29 November 1994 14 | Pumas UNAM | 1-2 | Veracruz | Tlalpan |
| | Pedro Massacessi 17' | | 41' Enrique Figueroa; 57' , Carlos Poblete | Stadium: Olimpico Universitario |

| 3 December 1994 15 | Veracruz | 2-2 | Tampico Madero | Veracruz |
| | Leonel Bolsonello 74'; Marco Antonio Benatto 89' "Marquinho" | | 43' Carlos Hernández; 48' Alejandro Domínguez | Stadium: Pirata Fuente |
Note: On Dec. 7, due to problems with the leasing of Estadio Tamaulipas, Tampico Madero was relocated in Querétaro and renamed as TM Gallos Blancos.

| 11 December 1994 16 | Necaxa | 2-0 | Veracruz | Tlalpan |
| | Basay 55', 67' | | | Stadium: Azteca |

| 17 December 1994 17 | Veracruz | 1-0 | CD Toluca | Veracruz |
| | Leonel Bolsonello 70' | | | Stadium: Pirata Fuente |

| 22 December 1994 18 | CF Monterrey | 0-0 | Veracruz | Monterrey |
| | | | | Stadium: Tecnológico |

| 29 December 1994 19 | Veracruz | 2-0 | Leon | Veracruz |
| | Leonel Bolsonello 34', 47' (pen.) | | | Stadium: Pirata Fuente |

| 7 January 1995 20 | Veracruz | 0-0 | Atlas FC | Veracruz |
| | | | | Stadium: Pirata Fuente |

| 13 January 1995 21 | Tecos UAG | 3-2 | Veracruz | Zapopan |
| | Eustacio Rizo 31', 37'; Dioney Carlos 81' | | 60' Leonel Bolsonello; 75' José Luis Malibrán | Stadium: 3 de Marzo |

| 21 January 1995 22 | Veracruz | 3-3 | Santos Laguna | Veracruz |
| | Víctor Medina 38'; Leonel Bolsonello 57' (pen.); José Luis Malibrán 71' | | 39' Antonio Apud; 52' Miguel Asprilla; 76' Begines | Stadium: Pirata Fuente |

| 28 January 1995 23 | Cruz Azul | 3-1 | Veracruz | Tlalpan |
| | Luis Carlos de Oliveira "Pintado" 5'; Carlos Hermosillo 77'; Octavio Mora 81' | | 21' José Luis Malibrán | Stadium: Azteca |

| 3 February 1995 24 | Veracruz | 0-0 | Atlético Morelia | Veracruz |
| | | | | Stadium: Pirata Fuente |

| 12 February 1995 25 | Atlante FC | 0-2 | Veracruz | Benito Juarez |
| | | | 38', 45' José Luis Malibrán | Stadium: Azulgrana |

| 18 February 1995 26 | Veracruz | 1-2 | Correcaminos UAT | Veracruz |
| | José Luis Malibrán 13' | | 29' (pen.) Ramiro Romero; 50' Arnold Cruz | Stadium: Pirata Fuente |

| 24 February 1995 27 | Tigres UANL | 0-2 | Veracruz | San Nicolas de los Garza |
| | | | 62', 73' José Luis Malibrán | Stadium: Universitario |

| 4 March 1995 28 | Veracruz | 0-1 | Toros Neza | Veracruz |
| | | | 3' (pen.) Guillermo Vázquez | Stadium: Pirata Fuente |

| 12 March 1995 29 | CD Guadalajara | 5-0 | Veracruz | Guadalajara |
| | Ignacio Vázquez 26', 75'; Espinosa 34'; Daniel Guzmán 85'; Alberto García 87' | | | Stadium: Jalisco |

| 18 March 1995 30 | Veracruz | bye | Leones Negros UdeG | Veracruz |
| | | | | Stadium: Pirata Fuente |

| 25 March 1995 31 | Puebla FC | 1-0 | Tiburones Rojos de Veracruz | Puebla de los Angeles |
| | Antonio Teodoro Dos Santos "Toninho" 48' | | | Stadium: Cuauhtemoc |

| 2 April 1995 32 | America | 1-1 | Veracruz | Tlalpan |
| | Francois-Omam Biyik 16' | | 18' Leonel Bolsonello | Stadium: Azteca |

| 5 April 1995 33 | Veracruz | 0-0 | Pumas UNAM | Veracruz |
| | | | | Stadium: Pirata Fuente |

| 9 April 1995 34 | TM Gallos Blancos | 1-1 | Veracruz | Queretaro |
| | Carlos Hernández 51' | | 4' José Luis Malibrán | Stadium: Corregidora |

| 15 April 1995 35 | Tiburones Rojos de Veracruz | 1-0 | Necaxa | Veracruz |
| | Leonel Bolsonello 36' | | | Stadium: Pirata Fuente |

| 23 April 1995 36 | CD Toluca | 1-2 | Veracruz | Toluca |
| | Cardozo 59' | | 64' Leonel Bolsonello; 67' José Luis Malibrán | Stadium: La Bombonera |

| 29 April 1995 37 | Veracruz | 2-4 | CF Monterrey | Veracruz |
| | Leonel Bolsonello 29' (pen.); Marco Antonio Benatto "Marquinho" 51' | | 42' José Nieves Castro; 46' Roberto Medina; 75' Carlos Alberto Bianchezi; 89' José Antonio Noriega | Stadium: Pirata Fuente |

| 6 May 1995 38 | Club León | 3-0 | Tiburones Rojos de Veracruz | Leon de los Aldama |
| | Gustavo Abel Dezotti 12'; Ricardo Cadena 42'; Isaac Ayipei 84' | | | Stadium: Nou Camp |

==== Repechaje ====
| 10 May 1995 | Veracruz | 1–1 | Puebla | Veracruz |
| 16:00 CT | Durán 55' | | 24' Cuevas | Stadium: Estadio Luis "Pirata" Fuente |

| 13 May 1995 | Puebla | 0–0 | Veracruz | Puebla |
| 20:00 CT | | | | Stadium: Estadio Cuauhtémoc |

=== Copa Mexico ===
==== Eighfinals ====
| 15 February 1994 | CD Irapuato | 1-2 | Veracruz | Irapuato |
| | Alberto Morales 65' | | 83', 88' Alberto Durán | Stadium: Sergio León Chávez |

==== Quarterfinals ====
| 28 February 1994 | Veracruz | 2-2 (5-4 p) | Tecos UAG | Irapuato |
| | Marquinho 17' (pen.); Marcelo Gonçalvez 34' (o.g.) | | 49' Claudio Morena; 71' Felipe del Ángel Malibrán | Stadium: Sergio León Chávez |

==== Semifinals ====
| 8 March 1995 | Veracruz | 2-0 | Santos Laguna | Benito Juarez |
| | Marquinho 15' (pen.); Diego Bustos 60' | | | Stadium: Azulgrana |

==== Final ====
| 15 March 1995 | Necaxa | 2-0 | Veracruz | Puebla de los Angeles |
| | Pelaez 11'; Pelaez 15' | | | Stadium: Cuauhtemoc |
