= List of Club Necaxa records and statistics =

These are some of Necaxa football club records from 1923–present

== Most appearances ==
| Jersey# | Name | Career | Appearances | Goals |
|---|---|---|---|---|
| 1 | (Mexico) Nicolás Navarro | (GK) 1983–97 to 1999–03 | 489 | data |
| 7 | (Ecuador) Álex Aguinaga | (MF) 1989–03 | 473 | 84 |
| 4 | (Mexico) Ignacio Ambríz | (DF) 1983–86, 1989–96 | 283 | 17 |
| 25 | (Argentina) Sergio Zárate | (MF) 1995–97, 1998–99, 1999–01 | 190 | 39 |
| 11 | (Chile) Ivo Basay | (FW) 1990–93 | 186 | 99 |

== Necaxa's Season lead scorers in the Amateur Football League or Liga Mayor de D.F (1923–1937) ==
| Jersey # | Name | Career | Goals | Appearances | Goals/Game Ratio |
|---|---|---|---|---|---|
| 26 | (Mexico) Miguel Ruiz | 1926–27 | 13 | data | 1 |
| 10 | (Peru) Julio Lorez | 1931–32 | 20 | data | 1 |
| 10 | (Peru) Julio Lorez | 1932–33 | 8 | data | 1 |
| 15 | (Mexico) Hilario López | 1934–35 | 17 | data | 1 |
| 15 | (Mexico) Hilario López | 1935–36 | 14 | data | 1 |
| 15 | (Mexico) Hilario López | 1936–37 | 11 | data | 0.532 |

== Necaxa's Season Career Scorers in the Liga De Ascenso ==
| Jersey # | Name | Career | Goals | Appearances | Goals/Game Ratio |
|---|---|---|---|---|---|
| 56 | (Uruguay) Nelson Sabastian Maz | 2009–10 | 23 | data | 1 |
| 59 | (Mexico) Mauricio Romero | 2009–10 | 8 | data | 1 |
| 49 | (Mexico) Alejandro Castillo | 2009–10 | 7 | data | 1 |
| 49 | (Mexico) Victor Lojero | Fall 2011 | 7 | 15 | 1 |
| 30 | (Brazil) Everaldo Barbosa | 2009–10 | 6 | data | 1 |

== Necaxa's Season lead scorers in the First Division League ==
| Jersey # | Name | Career | Goals | Appearances | Goals/Game Ratio |
|---|---|---|---|---|---|
| 2 | (Mexico) Horacio Casarin | 1950–51 | 17 | data | 1 |
| 23 | (Costa Rica) Tulio Quiñones | 1952–53 | 14 | data | 1 |
| 5 | (Uruguay) Julio María Palleiro | 1953–54 | 21 | data | 1 |
| 5 | (Uruguay) Julio María Palleiro | 1954–55 | 19 | data | 1 |
| 16 | (Argentina) Norberto Outes | 1983–84 | 28 | data | 1 |
| 11 | (Chile) Ivo Basay | 1992–93 | 27 | 186 | 0.532 |
| 9 | (Ecuador) Agustín Delgado | 2000 | 14 | 1 | 14 |

== Necaxa's Top three Single Season lead scorers in the First Division League ==
Single Season play began in 1996

| Jersey # | Name | Career | Goals | Appearances | Goals/Game Ratio |
|---|---|---|---|---|---|
| 9 | (Argentina) Alfredo Moreno | | 58 | 50 | 0.34 |
| 7 | (Ecuador) Alex Aguinaga | | 40 | 35 | 0.4 |
| 9 | (Ecuador) Agustin Delgado | | 41 | 45 | 0.467 |

== Necaxa's Single Season Assist leaders in the First Division League ==
| Jersey # | Name | Career | Assists |
|---|---|---|---|
| 7 | (Ecuador) Alex Aguinaga | 1989–03 | data |
| 25 | (Argentina) Sergio Zárate | 1995–01 | data |
| 8 | (Mexico) Garcia Aspe | | data |

== Necaxa's top ten leading strikers ==
| # | Name | Career | Goals | Appearances | Goals/Game Ratio |
|---|---|---|---|---|---|
| 1 | (Mexico) Ricardo Peláez | 1987–97 | 138 | 352 | 0.392 |
| 2 | (Chile) Ivo Basay | 1991-95 | 99 | 186 | 0.532 |
| 3 | (Ecuador) Álex Aguinaga | 1989–03 | 84 | 473 | 0.178 |
| 4 | (Mexico) Alberto García Aspe | 1991–97 | 69 | 185 | 0.373 |
| 5 | (Uruguay) Julio María Palleiro | 1951–59 | 64 | Data | 1 |
| 6 | (Mexico) Guillermo Ortiz | 1960–66 | 63 | Data | 1 |
| 7 | (Argentina) Alfredo Moreno | 2000–09 | 58 | 216 | 0.338 |
| 8 | (Uruguay) Javan Marinho | 1966–70 | 55 | Data | 1 |
| 9 | (Mexico) Francisco Noriega | 1955–65 | 47 | Data | 1 |
| 10 | (Ecuador) Agustín Delgado | 1999–01 | 17 | 40 | 0.386 |

=== Club Necaxa's Goal Keeping records ===
| No. | Player | Position | Necaxa career | | Notes |
| No. | Player | Position | Official debut | Last match | Notes |
|---|---|---|---|---|---|
| — | | | — | — | |
| 00 | (Austria) Ernest Pauler | Goalkeeper | | | |
| 00 | (Mexico) Raúl Estrada | Goalkeeper | | | |
| 1 | (Mexico) Nicolas Navarro | Goalkeeper | — | — | |

== Club Necaxa Managerial statistics ==
| Trainer | Nat | From | To | Record | | | | |
| Trainer | Nat | From | To | G | W | D | L | % |
|---|---|---|---|---|---|---|---|---|
| Light & Power Co.(A) | (England) (Mexico) | 1922 | 1923 | 14 | 2 | 3 | 9 | 14.29 |
| Streetcar Operators(A) | (Mexico) | 1922 | 1923 | 14 | 4 | 1 | 9 | 28.57 |
| MLAFA Total | | | | 28 | 6 | 4 | 18 | 21.43 |
| *Necaxa (A) | (England) (Mexico) (Peru) | 1923 | 1929 | 88 | 38 | 19 | 31 | 43.18 |
| *Necaxa (A) | (England) (Mexico) (Austria) | 1930** | 1939 | 76 | 46 | 9 | 21 | 60.53 |
| *Necaxa (A) | (Mexico) | 1940** | 1943 | 42 | 19 | 10 | 13 | 45.24 |
| MLAFA Total | | | | 220 | 105 | 41 | 74 | 47.73 |
| | | 1950 | 1951 | 22 | 12 | 4 | 6 | 54.55 |
| Lopez | (Spain) | 1951 | 1952 | 22 | 8 | 6 | 8 | 36.36 |
| Marcos | (Mexico) | 1953 | 1954 | 22 | 9 | 4 | 9 | 40.91 |
| — | | 1954 | 1955 | 22 | 10 | 5 | 7 | 45.45 |
| — | | 1955 | 1956 | 26 | 12 | 7 | 7 | 46.15 |
| — | | 1956 | 1957 | 24 | 7 | 7 | 10 | 29.17 |
| — | | 1957 | 1958 | 26 | 7 | 7 | 12 | 26.92 |
| — | | 1958 | 1959 | 26 | 4 | 12 | 10 | 15.38 |
| Ross | (Uruguay) | 1959 | 1960 | 26 | 6 | 12 | 8 | 23.08 |
| — | | 1960 | 1961 | 26 | 9 | 11 | 6 | 34.62 |
| — | | 1961 | 1962 | 26 | 7 | 8 | 11 | 26.92 |
| — | | 1962 | 1963 | 26 | 9 | 7 | 10 | 34.62 |
| — | | 1963 | 1964 | 26 | 11 | 5 | 10 | 42.31 |
| — | | 1964 | 1965 | 30 | 9 | 9 | 12 | 30.00 |
| Ross | (Uruguay) | 1965 | 1966 | 30 | 10 | 9 | 11 | 33.33 |
| Marín | (Mexico) | 1966 | 1967 | 30 | 11 | 12 | 7 | 36.67 |
| — | | 1967 | 1968 | 30 | 14 | 8 | 8 | 46.67 |
| — | | 1968 | 1969 | 30 | 10 | 9 | 11 | 33.33 |
| Moncebaez Maceda | (Uruguay) | 1969 | 1969 | 30 | 11 | 11 | 8 | 36.67 |
| Marín | (Mexico) | 1970 | 1971 | 34 | 10 | 11 | 13 | 29.41 |
| Marín | (Mexico) | 1971 | 1972 | 34 | 8 | 8 | 18 | 23.53 |
| Prieto | (Mexico) | 1972 | 1973 | 34 | 12 | 12 | 10 | 35.29 |
| **Prieto | (Mexico) | 1973 | 1974 | 34 | 15 | 11 | 8 | 44.12 |
| **Prado | (Chile) | 1974 | 1975 | 38 | 20 | 7 | 11 | 52.63 |
| **Prado | (Chile) | 1975 | 1976 | 38 | 10 | 18 | 10 | 26.32 |
| **Roca | (Mexico) | 1976 | 1977 | 38 | 15 | 13 | 10 | 39.47 |
| **Roca | (Mexico) | 1977 | 1978 | 38 | 13 | 15 | 10 | 34.21 |
| **— | (Mexico) | 1978 | 1979 | 38 | 13 | 10 | 15 | 34.21 |
| **— | (Mexico) | 1979 | 1980 | 38 | 11 | 8 | 19 | 28.95 |
| **— | (Mexico) | 1980 | 1981 | 38 | 15 | 12 | 11 | 39.47 |
| **— | (Mexico) | 1981 | 1982 | 38 | 12 | 9 | 17 | 31.58 |
| Diaz | (Mexico) | 1982 | 1983 | 38 | 8 | 16 | 14 | 21.05 |
| — | (Mexico) | 1983 | 1984 | 38 | 10 | 12 | 16 | 26.32 |
| — | (Mexico) | 1984 | 1985 | 38 | 5 | 15 | 18 | 13.16 |
| — | | 1985 | 1986 | 8 | 2 | 3 | 3 | 25.00 |
| Pérez | (Mexico) | 1986 | 1987 | 18 | 5 | 4 | 9 | 27.78 |
| Ré Ramírez | (Paraguay) | 1987 | 1988 | 40 | 8 | 17 | 15 | 20.00 |
| Ré Ramírez | (Paraguay) | 1988 | 1989 | 38 | 17 | 11 | 10 | 44.74 |
| Ruiz | (Paraguay) | 1989 | 1990 | 38 | 11 | 17 | 10 | 28.95 |
| Luján Manera | (Argentina) | 1990 | 1991 | 38 | 12 | 11 | 15 | 31.58 |
| Saporiti | (Argentina) | 1991 | 1992 | 38 | 16 | 14 | 8 | 42.11 |
| M.Lapuente | (Mexico) | 1994 | 1997 | 143 | 62 | 46 | 35 | 43.36 |
| 1st Division of Mexico Total | | | | 1,362 | 486 | 400 | 476 | 35.68 |
| R. Arias | (Mexico) | 1998 | 2005 | 297 | 120 | 76 | 101 | 40.40 |
| E.Zarza | (Mexico) | 2005 | 2006 | 45 | 16 | 10 | 19 | 35.56 |
| P. Luna | (Mexico) | 2006 | 2006 | 1 | 0 | 1 | 0 | 0.00 |
| H.Sanchez | (Mexico) | 2006 | 2006 | 7 | 2 | 1 | 4 | 28.57 |
| J.Trejo | (Mexico) | 2007 | 2007 | 17 | 4 | 6 | 7 | 23.53 |
| H. Westerhoff | (Netherlands) | 2007 | 2007 | 17 | 5 | 5 | 7 | 29.41 |
| S. Reyes | (Mexico) | 2008 | 2008 | 33 | 6 | 18 | 9 | 18.18 |
| O. Becerril | (Mexico) | 2008 | 2008 | 5 | 2 | 2 | 1 | 40.00 |
| R.Arias | (Mexico) | 2009 | 2009 | 17 | 3 | 5 | 9 | 17.65 |
| (FMF 1st Division rank#12) Total | | | | 439 | 158 | 124 | 157 | 35.99 |
| O.Arellano | (Mexico) | 2009 | 2010 | 16 | 8 | 4 | 4 | 50.00 |
| O.Arellano | (Mexico) | 2010 | 2011 | 16 | 8 | 8 | 0 | 50.00 |
| (Ascension League rank#12) Total | | | | 32 | 16 | 12 | 4 | 50.00 |
| O.Arellano | (Mexico) | 2011 | 2011 | 12 | 6 | 5 | 1 | 50.00 |
| D. Brailovsky | (Argentina) | 2011 | 2011 | 15 | 3 | 1 | 11 | 20.00 |
| S.Bueno | (Mexico) | 2011 | 2011 | 13 | 3 | 6 | 4 | 23.08 |
| ( FMF 1st Division rank#13) Total | | | | 0 | 0 | 0 | 0 | — |
| F. Ramírez | (Mexico) | 2011 | 2011 | 11 | 5 | 3 | 3 | 45.45 |
| Luis Francisco Garcia LIamas | (Mexico) | 2011 | 2011 | 15 | 6 | 5 | 4 | 40.00 |
| Milton Queiroz da Paixão | (Brazil) | 2012–present | ? | 0 | 0 | 0 | 0 | — |
| (Ascension League rank#11) Total | | | | 0 | 0 | 0 | 0 | — |

- Amateur era 1920–1943
  - no football played in 1930–1931 season
  - "Professional Mexican" football begins 1943 in Mexico(Early Capitalism)
    - Athletico Espanol
      - "Professional Mexican" football begins 1997 in Mexico(Advanced Capitalism)

== Club Records ==
- Most Goals in National Championship: 9–0 vs Atlante (27-Oct-1934)
- Most Goals in a Single season : 5–0 vs Pachuca (27-Sept-2005)
- Most Goals in an International Tournament: 6–0 vs Morelia (26-Feb-2002)
- Best Position in Table: 1º (Season 1992–1993)
- Worst Position in Table: 18º (2009)
- Longest undefeated streak: 29 games (Fall 2009 + Spring 2010)

== Individual Necaxa Footballer Awards ==
=== CONCACAF Footballer of the Year ===
The following players have won the CONCACAF Footballer of the Year award while playing for Club Necaxa:

- (Mexico) Adolfo Ríos (1996–97)
- (Mexico) Adolfo Ríos (1998)

=== CONCACAF Youth Footballer of the Year ===
- (Mexico) Luis Pérez (1999)

=== Bicentennial Golden Footballer of the Year 2010 ===
- (Argentina) Pablo Quatrocchi (2010)

== Coaching History ==
| Dates | Name | Notes |
|---|---|---|
| 1922–1926 | (England) A. Crowle | Played and train the club as well as the national Team in 1935 |
| 1930–1938 | (Austria) Ernest Pauler | Manager and Team Captain and Championismo Manager |
| 1950–1951 | (Hungary) György Orth | Team Mexico Coach 1947 |
| 1951–1952 | (Spain) Antonio López Herranz | |
| 1953–1954 | (Mexico) Fernando Marcos | |
| 1959–1960 | (Uruguay) Donaldo"el Viejo" Ross | Famed C.D. Guadalajara manager |
| 1963–1964 | (Argentina) Pedro Dellacha | |
| 1965 | (Uruguay) Donaldo"el Viejo" Ross | |
| 1965–1966 | (Mexico) Miguel Marín | |
| 1969 | (Uruguay) José Moncebáez Maceda | |
| 1970–1975 | (Mexico) Miguel Marín | |
| 1971–1972 | (Mexico) J. Gutiérrez | |
| 1972–1974 | (Chile) A.Prieto | |
| 1974–1975 | (Mexico) C.Prado | |
| 1976–1978 | (Mexico) José Antonio Roca | |
| 1982–1983 | (Mexico) Enrique Diaz | |
| 1984–1985 | (Mexico) José Antonio Roca | Team Mexico Coach 1977–1978 |
| 1986 | (Mexico) Mario Pérez | |
| 1987–1988 | (Paraguay) Cayetano Ré Ramírez | |
| 1989–1990 | (Paraguay) Anibal Ruiz | Anibal was well known for his defensive and ordered style of coaching and part of the legacy of Necaxa's Championismo |
| 1990–1991 | (Argentina) Eduardo Luján Manera | the Argentine football defender, and a player manager. Instrumental part of Necaxa's Championismo titles |
| 1991–1994 | (Argentina) Roberto Marcos Saporiti | Former Argentine Footballer and Manager. Instrumental part of Necaxa's Championismo titles |
| 1994–1997 | (Mexico) Manuel LaPuente Diaz | Championismo Manager and Team Mexico Coach 1997–2000 |
| 1998–2005 | (Mexico) Raul Arias | 2000 FIFA Club World Championship Manager |
| 2004 | (Mexico) Enrique Lopez Zarza | |
| 2006 | (Mexico) Pablo Luna | |
| Fall 2007 | (Mexico) Hugo Sanchez | Team Mexico Coach 2006–2008 |
| Spring 2007 | (Mexico) Jose Luis Trejo | |
| Fall 2007 | (Netherlands) Hans Westerhoff | |
| Spring 2008 | (Mexico) Salvador Reyes | |
| Fall 2008 | (Mexico) Octavio Becerril | |
| Spring 2009 | (Mexico) Raul Arias | |
| Fall 2009 - Bicentennial 2010 | (Mexico) Omar Arellano Nuño | Liga de Ascenso Bi-championship Manager 2009–2010 |
| Fall 2010 – Spring 2011 | (Uruguay) / (Argentina) Daniel Brailovsky | |
| Spring 2011 – Spring 2011 | (Mexico) Sergio Bueno | |
| Fall 2011–Fall 2011 | (Mexico) Francisco Ramírez | |
| Fall 2011 | (Mexico) Luis Francisco Garcia | |
| Spring 2011–Present | (Brazil) Milton Queiroz da Paixão aka "Titia" | |

- Player/Coach/Captain

Necaxa footballers(free-agency economic model)
