= 1996–97 Club Necaxa season =

Necaxa
1996–97 season
- Manager: Manuel Lapuente
- Stadium: Estadio Azteca
- Invierno: 6th Playoffs: Runners-up
- Verano: 4th Playoffs: Semifinals
- Copa México: Group stage
- Top goalscorer: League: Marco Antonio Figueroa (19 goals); All: Marco Antonio Figueroa (20 goals)
- Biggest win: Necaxa 4–0 Veracruz (7 February 1997)
- Biggest defeat: Santos Laguna 4–2 Necaxa (22 December 1996)
- All statistics correct as of 1 February 2019.

The 1996–97 Club Necaxa season was the 9th season since the team's revival after being replaced by Atlético Español in 1971. Necaxa competed in Primera División and Copa México, reaching the final in the Invierno 1996 tournament.

== Coaching staff ==
Position	Name
Head coach	(Mexico) Manuel Lapuente
Assistant coaches	(Mexico) Mario Carrillo
Assistant coaches	(Mexico) Luis Esponda
Fitness coach	(Argentina) Roberto Bassagaisteguy
Doctor	(Mexico) Julio Cantú

== Players ==
=== Squad information ===
No.	Pos.	Nat.	Name	Date of birth (age)	Signed in	Previous club
Goalkeepers
1	GK	(Mexico)	Nicolás Navarro	17 September 1963 (aged 32)	1983	(Mexico) Youth system
19	GK	(Mexico)	Raúl Orvañanos Jr.	3 July 1969 (aged 27)	1992	(Mexico) Cruz Azul
Defenders
2	DF	(Brazil)	Suelio da Silva	11 December 1967 (aged 28)		
3	DF	(Chile)	Eduardo Vilches	21 April 1963 (aged 33)	1994	(Chile) Colo-Colo
4	DF	(Mexico)	Roberto Ruiz Esparza	16 January 1965 (aged 31)	1996 (Winter)	(Mexico) UANL
5	DF	(Mexico)	José Luis Montes de Oca	21 December 1967 (aged 28)	1997 (Winter)	(Mexico) Toluca
15	DF	(Mexico)	Octavio Becerril	31 March 1964 (aged 32)	1994	(Mexico) Veracruz
20	DF	(Mexico)	José María Higareda	16 June 1968 (aged 28)	1994	(Mexico) UdeG
24	DF	(Mexico)	Jaime Hernández	6 December 1972 (aged 23)	1996 (Winter)	(Mexico) Internacional de Acapulco
Midfielders
6	MF	(Mexico)	José Castro	20 April 1972 (aged 24)	1996	(Mexico) Monterrey
8	MF	(Mexico)	Alberto García Aspe	11 May 1967 (aged 29)	1991	(Mexico) UNAM
18	MF	(Mexico)	Jesús Eduardo Córdova	21 February 1968 (aged 28)	1996	(Mexico) Puebla
22	MF	(Mexico)	Mario Ordiales	23 December 1963 (aged 32)	1996	(Mexico) Santos Laguna
35	MF	(Mexico)	René Fuentes	5 June 1973 (aged 23)		
Forwards
9	FW	(Mexico)	Ricardo Peláez	14 March 1963 (aged 33)	1987	(Mexico) América
12	FW	(Mexico)	Luis Hernández	22 December 1968 (aged 27)	1994	(Mexico) Monterrey
13	FW	(Mexico)	Edson Alvarado	27 September 1975 (aged 20)	1994	(Mexico) Youth system
21	FW	(Uruguay)	Sergio Vázquez	14 October 1972 (aged 23)	1997 (Winter)	(Chile) Deportes Antofagasta

Players and squad numbers last updated on 1 February 2019.
Note: Flags indicate national team as has been defined under FIFA eligibility rules. Players may hold more than one non-FIFA nationality.

== Competitions ==
=== Overview ===
Competition	First match	Last match	Starting round	Final position	Record							
Competition	First match	Last match	Starting round	Final position	Pld	W	D	L	GF	GA	GD	Win %
Torneo Invierno	11 August 1996	22 December 1996	Matchday 1	Runners-up	23	12	5	6	37	28	+9	52.17
Torneo Verano	11 January 1997	25 May 1997	Matchday 1	4th	21	10	4	7	39	27	+12	47.62
Copa México	7 July 1996	27 July 1996	Group stage	Group stage	7	4	1	2	13	11	+2	57.14
Total					51	26	10	15	89	66	+23	50.98

Source: RSSSF.com

=== Torneo Invierno ===
==== League table ====
Pos	Team	Pld	W	D	L	GF	GA	GD	Pts	Qualification or relegation
4	Puebla	17	9	4	4	32	22	+10	31	Advance to Liguilla (Playoffs)
5	Toluca	17	9	3	5	26	15	+11	30	Advance to Liguilla (Playoffs)
6	Necaxa	17	8	5	4	24	19	+5	29	Advance to Liguilla (Playoffs)
7	Atlas	17	6	8	3	28	26	+2	26	Advance to Repechage
8	Toros Neza	17	8	0	9	30	36	−6	24	Advance to Repechage

Source: Liga MX
Rules for classification: 1) Points; 2) Goal difference; 3) Number of goals scored; 4) Head-to-head results between tied teams; 5) Number of goals scored away; 6) Highest relegation coefficient; 7) Fair Play points

==== Results summary ====
Overall								Home						Away					
Pld	W	D	L	GF	GA	GD	Pts	W	D	L	GF	GA	GD	W	D	L	GF	GA	GD
17	8	5	4	24	19	+5	29	4	2	3	12	9	+3	4	3	1	12	10	+2

Source: Liga MX

=== Torneo Verano ===
==== League table ====
Pos	Team	Pld	W	D	L	GF	GA	GD	Pts	Qualification or relegation
2	Guadalajara (C)	17	9	7	1	27	16	+11	34	Advance to Liguilla (Playoffs)
3	Toros Neza	17	9	3	5	40	32	+8	30	Advance to Liguilla (Playoffs)
4	Necaxa	17	8	4	5	33	20	+13	28	Advance to Liguilla (Playoffs)
5	Atlante	17	8	4	5	23	19	+4	28	Advance to Liguilla (Playoffs)
6	UNAM	17	8	3	6	25	26	−1	27	Advance to Liguilla (Playoffs)

Source: Liga MX
Rules for classification: 1) Points; 2) Goal difference; 3) Number of goals scored; 4) Head-to-head results between tied teams; 5) Number of goals scored away; 6) Highest relegation coefficient; 7) Fair Play points
(C) Champions

==== Results summary ====
Overall								Home						Away					
Pld	W	D	L	GF	GA	GD	Pts	W	D	L	GF	GA	GD	W	D	L	GF	GA	GD
17	8	4	5	33	20	+13	28	4	3	1	15	7	+8	4	1	4	18	13	+5

Source: Liga MX

== Statistics ==
=== Own goals ===
Player	Against	Result	Date	Competition
(Mexico) Gerardo Esquivel	Morelia	2–1 (H)	2 November 1996	Primera División
