= Manuel Sol =

Mexican footballer and analyst (born 1973)

Personal information
- Full name: Manuel Bernardo Sol Sañudo
- Date of birth: 31 August 1973 (age 53)
- Place of birth: Mexico City, Mexico
- Height: 1.72 m (5 ft 8 in)
- Position: Midfielder

Senior career*
| Years | Team | Apps | (Gls) |
| 1992–1994 | UNAM | 12 | (1) |
| 1994–1996 | Necaxa | 33 | (1) |
| 1996–1997 | Atlante | 11 | (0) |
| 1997–1998 | Puebla | 34 | (4) |
| 1998–1999 | Monterrey | 17 | (1) |
| 1999–2001 | Atlante | 75 | (3) |
| 2001–2007 | Guadalajara | 189 | (6) |

International career
| 1993 | Mexico U20 | 3 | (0) |
| 1996 | Mexico | 4 | (0) |
- * Club domestic league appearances and goals as of 7 April 2007

Bernardo Manuel Sol Sañudo (born 31 August 1973) is a Mexican former professional footballer and former analyst for Telemundo Deportes.

== Career ==
Born in Mexico City, Sol was a product of the Pumas UNAM youth system and made his club debut at age 16.

Sol is most notable for his time at Chivas. After the Clausura 2007 Manuel Sol announced his retirement.

He represented Mexico at the 1996 Summer Olympics and the 1996 Nike U.S. Cup.

Sol was a game and studio analyst for Telemundo Deportes from 2013-2025, often paired with Andrés Cantor. He was a part of the network's broadcast team for Premier League matches, FIFA World Cup qualifiers, and various events such as the 2016 Summer Olympics, and both 2018 and 2022 FIFA World Cups.

== Honours ==
Necaxa

- Mexican Primera División: 1994–95, 1995–96
- Copa México: 1994–95
- Campeón de Campeones: 1995
- CONCACAF Cup Winners Cup: 1994

Guadalajara

- Mexican Primera División: Apertura 2006

Mexico

- Pan American Games Silver Medal: 1995
