= Gerardo Esquivel =

Mexican footballer (born 1966)

Personal information
- Full name: Gerardo Esquivel Butrón
- Date of birth: January 13, 1966 (age 60)
- Place of birth: Mexico City, Mexico
- Height: 1.75 m (5 ft 9 in)
- Position: Midfielder

Senior career*
Years	Team	Apps	(Gls)
1986–1999	Necaxa	367	(9)
1999–2000	Puebla	4	(0)

International career^{‡}
1988–1995	Mexico	4	(0)

Managerial career
- 2005: Alacranes de Durango (Assistant)
- 2006–2007: Cruz Azul (Assistant)
- 2007: Monterrey (Assistant)
- 2009: San Luis (Assistant)
- 2010: Tijuana (Assistant)
- 2010: León (Assistant)
- 2013: San Luis (Assistant)
- 2013: Puebla (Assistant)
- 2014–2015: Correcaminos UAT (Assistant)
- 2015–2016: América (Assistant)
- 2017–2018: Necaxa (Assistant)
- 2018–2021: León (Assistant)
- 2023: Tijuana (Assistant)
- 2024: América Reserves and Academy
- 2025-2026: León (Assistant)
- * Club domestic league appearances and goals as of 8 June 2009 ‡ National team caps and goals as of 9 July 2007

Gerardo Esquivel Butrón (born 13 January 1966) is a Mexican former footballer who played as a midfielder.

== Club career ==
A longtime member of Necaxa, Esquivel spent twelve years with the club, including its highly successful period in the mid-1990s. Normally a holding midfielder, Esquivel also had the versatility to play in the defensive line. His work freed colleagues Alex Aguinaga and Alberto García Aspe to conduct the offensive maneuvers in midfield. Esquivel won three championships, in 1995, 1996, and the Invierno 1998 season, during his time at Necaxa. He spent his last season at the top level with Puebla.

== International career ==
Esquivel obtained a total of four caps for the Mexico national team between 1988 and 1995, and was a squad member at the 1995 Copa América. He made his debut in a friendly match against El Salvador on 29 March 1988, a heavy 8–0 victory for Mexico. Esquivel did not return to the Mexico national team for seven years, when he earned a recall based on his title-winning season at Necaxa. His final cap came in a 4–0 loss to the United States on June 18, 1995, in the U.S. Cup at RFK Stadium in Washington.
