= 1994–95 Copa México =

Tournament details
- Country: Mexico
- Teams: 38

Final positions
- Champions: Necaxa (3rd Title)
- Runners-up: Veracruz

Tournament statistics
- Matches played: 37
- Goals scored: 86 (2.32 per match)

The 1994–95 Copa México is the 65th staging of the Copa México, the 38th staging in the professional era after an absence of 2 years.

The competition started on January 24, 1995, and concluded on March 15, 1995, with the final, in which Necaxa lifted the trophy for third time ever with a 2–0 victory over Veracruz.

This edition was played by 38 teams from the Primera División and the Primera División A.

== First round ==
Team 1	Score	Team 2
Zacatepec	0–2	Tecos UAG
San Luis	2–3	Club América
Marte	2–0	Correcaminos UAT
Jalapa	2–1	Toluca
Yucatán	0–0 (4–3 pen.)	Atlas
Tabasco	0–0 (3–4 pen.)	Toros Neza
Aguascalientes	0–1	Santos Laguna
Bachilleres	3–1	Leon
Cancún	0–0 (4–2 pen.)	Tigres UANL
Acapulco	1–1 (2–1 pen.)	Atlante F.C.
La Piedad	2–0	Pumas UNAM
Irapuato	3–3 (5–3 pen.)	Cruz Azul
San Francisco	3–2	Guadalajara
UAQ	1–2	Veracruz
Atletico Celaya	2–2 (4–3 pen.)	Atletico Morelia
Tepic	0–2	Monterrey
Cruz Azul Hidalgo	2–1	Tampico Madero
Pachuca	1–1 (4–5 pen.)	Necaxa
Tijuana	0–0 (1–3 pen.)	Puebla

== Second round ==
Team 1	Score	Team 2
Jalapa	0–3	Santos Laguna
Marte	0–2	Tecos UAG
San Francisco	0–1	Club América
Yucatán	1–0	Monterrey
Bachilleres	2–0	Cruz Azul Hidalgo
Cancún	0–1	Toros Neza
Acapulco	0–1	Veracruz
Irapuato	1–0	Puebla
La Piedad	2–0	Atletico Morelia

Necaxa Bye to Semifinal

== Third round ==
Team 1	Score	Team 2
La Piedad	0–1	Tecos UAG
Yucatán	2–3	Toros Neza
Irapuato	1–2	Veracruz
Bachilleres	2–2 (3–4 pen.)	Santos Laguna

Club América Bye to Semifinal

== Quarterfinals ==
Team 1	Score	Team 2
Veracruz	2–2 (5–4 pen.)	Tecos UAG
Santos Laguna	2–1	Toros Neza

== Semifinals ==
Team 1	Score	Team 2
Necaxa	2–2 (4–3 pen.)	Club América
Veracruz	2–0	Santos Laguna

== Final ==
Team 1	Score	Team 2
Necaxa	2–0	Veracruz

=== Line ups ===
Necaxa: Nicolás Navarro; José María Higareda, Eduardo Vilches, Octavio Becerril y Gerardo Esquivel; Ignacio Ambriz, Alberto García Aspe y Álex Aguinaga; Sergio Zárate, Ricardo Peláez e Ivo Basay. Coach: Manuel Lapuente.
VERACRUZ : Rafael Calderón; Pascual Ramírez, Pedro Osorio, Martín Yamasaki y Francisco Ramírez; Víctor “Harlem” Medina, Enrique Figueroa, Marco Benatto “Marqinho” (Diego Bustos) y José Luis González China; Carlos Poblete (Leonel Bolsonello) y José Luis Malibrán. Coach: Aníbal Ruiz

Copa México 1994–95 Winners
Necaxa
3rd Title
