= Ad Stouthamer =

Dutch microbiologist (1931–2023)

Adriaan Hendrik "Ad" Stouthamer (31 October 1931 – 20 February 2023) was a Dutch microbiologist. He was a professor at the Vrije Universiteit Amsterdam from the 1960s to 1996. His research was mostly focused on the metabolism of microbiological cultures.

== Life and career ==
Stouthamer was born on 31 October 1931 in Sas van Gent. He was a keen student at school in Terneuzen. Stouthamer was nine years old when World War II broke out. During the war at one time he had to fall of a dike when a British Supermarine Spitfire flew over. The liberation of the Netherlands had a large impact on him.

In 1960 he obtained his doctorate at Utrecht University under Klaas Winkler with a thesis titled: Koolhydraatstofwisseling van de azijnzuurbacteriën. In 1963 he became lecturer at the Vrije Universiteit Amsterdam. In 1968 he was appointed as professor and gave his inaugural lecture the same year. At the university he founded a large department for microbiology and was also involved in the improvement of education. From 1992 to 1995 he had a special teaching assignment in applied microbiology. He retired in autumn 1996 and was succeeded in his chair by Hans Westerhoff. At his final lecture Stouthamer stated that 99% of all microorganisms still needed to be described, and that at the rate of that time it would take another 8,300 years.

The research of Stouthamer was mostly focused on the metabolism of microbiological cultures. In his laboratory he experimented on a large scale with self developed cultures. His successor, Westerhoff, stated that Stouthamers biggest contribution to science was the calculation of much energy it would to cost to make a living cell. This calculation came to be used in numerous biochemical processes. It also lead to an issue that as of 2023 has yet to be solved by science, namely that human cells are losing half their energy rather than using it for multiplication.

Stouthamer was elected a member of the Royal Netherlands Academy of Arts and Sciences in 1974. He was also named a knight in the Order of the Netherlands Lion. In 1991 he gave the Kluyver lecture at the Royal Netherlands Association for Microbiology. Stouthamer served as editor-in-chief of the Antonie van Leeuwenhoek journal. He also served as advisor to Gist-Brocades.

Stouthamer married in 1957 and had two daughters. His wife died in 2017. He was diagnosed with dementia in 2018. He died on 20 February 2023, at the age of 91.
