= Ignacio Ambríz =

Mexican footballer and manager (born 1965)

Ignacio Ambriz
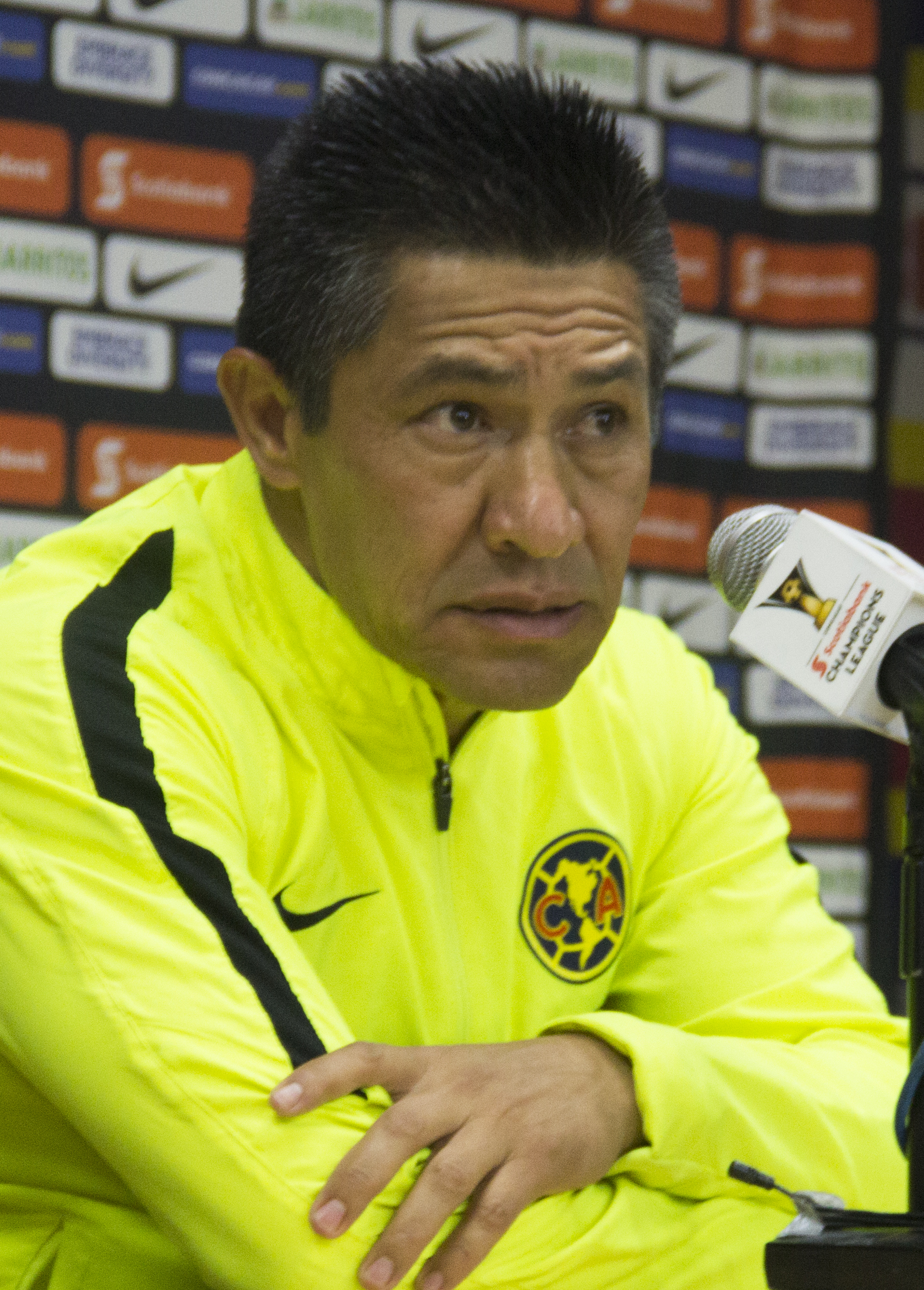
- Ambriz as América manager in 2015

Personal information
- Full name: Marcos Ignacio Ambriz Espinoza
- Date of birth: 7 February 1965 (age 61)
- Place of birth: Mexico City, Mexico
- Height: 1.75 m (5 ft 9 in)
- Position: Centre-back

Senior career*
Years	Team	Apps	(Gls)
1983–1986	Necaxa	33	(0)
1986–1987	Petroleros		
1987–1989	León		
1989–1996	Necaxa	193	(16)
1996–1997	Atlante	22	(3)
1998	Puebla	19	(0)
1998	Celaya	7	(0)
1999–2001	Necaxa	57	(1)
Total		331	(20)

International career
1992–1995	Mexico	64	(5)

Managerial career
- 2002: Mexico (assistant)
- 2003: Puebla
- 2003–2006: Osasuna (assistant)
- 2006–2009: Atlético Madrid (assistant)
- 2009–2011: San Luis
- 2012: Guadalajara
- 2013–2015: Querétaro
- 2015–2016: América
- 2017–2018: Necaxa
- 2018–2021: León
- 2021: Huesca
- 2022–2023: Toluca
- 2024: Santos Laguna
- 2025–2026: León
Medal record
Representing Mexico
Runner-up	Copa America	1993
- * Club domestic league appearances and goals

Marcos Ignacio "Nacho" Ambriz Espinoza (born 7 February 1965) is a Mexican professional manager and former footballer.

== Playing career ==
Playing for various clubs in Mexico, Ambríz is closely associated with Club Necaxa, a club he had three spells with, and was part of two championship-winning seasons in 1994–95 and 1995–96.

Ambríz earned 64 caps and scored 6 goals for the Mexico national team between 1992 and 1995, and captained the squad at the 1994 FIFA World Cup, where he played in all four games. He also formed part of the national squad that won the 1993 CONCACAF Gold Cup.

== Managerial career ==
=== Early career ===
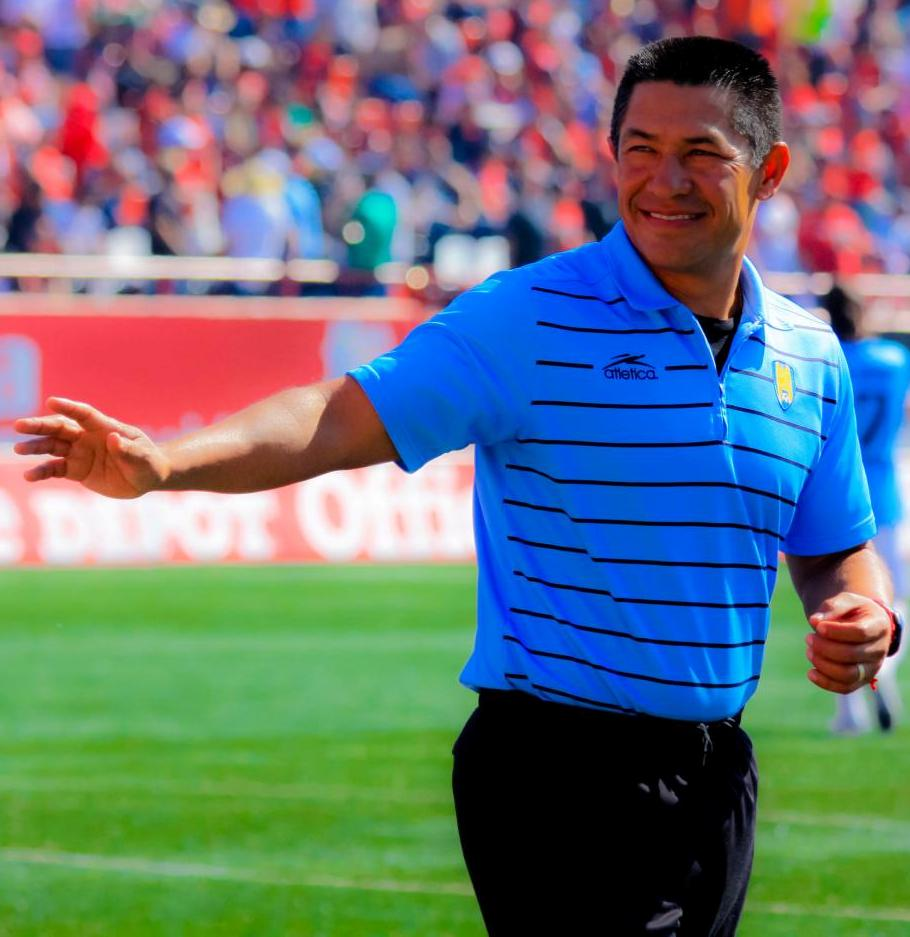
Ambríz with San Luis in 2011

Following his retirement from the playing field, Ambríz began his coaching career in 2002 with the Mexico national team, where he was the assistant to Javier Aguirre, taking part in the 2002 FIFA World Cup. Following his participation with the national team, he joined Puebla, managing only seven matches. In 2003, he was once again the assistant to Javier Aguirre at Spanish clubs Osasuna and Atlético de Madrid. They parted company when Aguirre was sacked from the Madrid position in 2009. He also had spells with San Luis – from 2009 to 2011 – and Guadalajara in 2012, only in charge for twelve matches.

=== Querétaro ===
On 4 February 2013 Adolfo Ríos, President of Querétaro, announced Ambríz as their new manager after the club sacked Sergio Bueno after a 3–0 loss to Club América at Estadio Azteca. He managed the club up until February 2015, where Ambríz was sacked after a string of bad results during the Clausura tournament.

=== Club América ===
On 26 May 2015, Ambríz was confirmed as the new manager at Club América, signing a two-year contract. He led América to a disappointing run at the FIFA Club World Cup, losing the quarter-final match to Chinese team Guangzhou Evergrande, and defeating Congolese club TP Mazembe to claim a fifth-place finish in the competition. The following year, Ambríz led América to the CONCACAF Champions League finals, defeating Tigres UANL 4–1 on aggregate, thus earning their qualification to the 2016 FIFA Club World Cup. In September, he was ranked as the 10th best coach according to Football Coach World Ranking. On 17 September, after suffering a 2–0 home defeat to León, Ambríz was sacked as manager the following day.

=== Necaxa ===
In August 2017, Ambríz was appointed manager of Necaxa, staying with the club for a year; he won the Clausura 2018 Copa MX with Necaxa, beating Toluca 1–0 in the final to end a 19-year trophy-less drought for the club.

=== Club León ===
"We are all conscious that at any moment we can be at full-back, at any moment we can be holding midfielders, forwards, and we have to take on the roles and play as the position demands, and that is something that "Nacho" likes."

— Club León footballer Fernando Navarro Morán

On 18 September 2018, Ambríz was named manager of Club León, replacing Gustavo Díaz. During the 2019 Clausura, he helped León attain the records of most consecutive wins with eleven and the most points attained during the current 17-match tournament format with 41 points and a first-place finish. They faced Tigres UANL in the Clausura championship final but lost following an aggregate score of 1–0. Despite the loss, his feats with the club contributed to him being named best manager at the conclusion of the season. After a first-place finish in the Guardianes 2020 general table, on 13 December, León won the league title defeating Club Universidad Nacional with an aggregate score of 3–1, becoming Mexico's joint fourth most successful team with eight titles in total alongside Cruz Azul.

Following León's championship win, Ambríz and Club León were unable to reach an agreement for Ambríz's contractual renewal. Ambríz opted to not renew the contract, citing his desire to manage a European club.

=== Huesca ===
On 28 June 2021, Ambríz became the manager of La Liga club Huesca. On 25 October, he was dismissed from his position following a disappointing start.

=== Toluca ===
On 1 December 2021, Toluca appointed Ambríz as their new manager. On 25 October 2023, Ambríz and Toluca parted ways by mutual agreement.

=== Santos Laguna ===
On 12 February 2024, Santos Laguna announced Ambríz as their new manager. On 11 November 2024, Ambríz resigned from his role following the club's last-place finish in the Apertura 2024 tournament.

=== Return to León ===
On 29 September 2025, Ambríz took on the position of head coach at León, starting his second spell with the club. On 14 March 2026, he stepped down from his role.

== Career statistics ==
=== International goals ===
#	Date	Venue	Opponent	Score	Result	Competition
1	April 11, 1993	Estadio Azteca, Mexico City, Mexico	Honduras	3–0	3–0	1994 FIFA World Cup qualification
2	April 18, 1993	Estadio Azteca, Mexico City, Mexico	El Salvador	1–0	3–1	1994 FIFA World Cup qualification
3	July 22, 1993	Estadio Azteca, Mexico City, Mexico	Jamaica	5–1	6–1	1993 CONCACAF Gold Cup
4	July 25, 1993	Estadio Azteca, Mexico City, Mexico	United States	1–0	4–0	1993 CONCACAF Gold Cup
5	November 3, 1993	Jack Murphy Stadium, San Diego, United States	China	1–0	3–0	Friendly

== Managerial statistics ==
As of match played 14 March 2026

Managerial record by team and tenure
Team	Nat	From	To	Record							
Team	Nat	From	To	G	W	D	L	GF	GA	GD	Win %
Puebla	(Mexico)	1 April 2003	30 June 2003	7	2	2	3	7	11	−4	28.57
San Luis	(Mexico)	10 December 2009	9 November 2011	78	22	25	31	90	103	−13	28.21
Guadalajara	(Mexico)	25 January 2012	19 April 2012	18	5	4	9	12	23	−11	27.78
Querétaro	(Mexico)	4 February 2013	23 February 2015	98	37	24	37	114	111	+3	37.76
América	(Mexico)	26 May 2015	18 September 2016	68	37	12	19	126	83	+43	54.41
Necaxa	(Mexico)	15 May 2017	9 May 2018	47	18	18	11	62	42	+20	38.30
León	(Mexico)	19 September 2018	11 May 2021	114	60	27	27	195	125	+70	52.63
Huesca	(Spain)	28 June 2021	25 October 2021	12	4	3	5	15	13	+2	33.33
Toluca	(Mexico)	1 December 2021	25 October 2023	77	33	23	21	133	117	+16	42.86
Santos Laguna	(Mexico)	12 February 2024	12 November 2024	31	5	8	18	22	50	−28	16.13
León	(Mexico)	29 September 2025	14 March 2026	16	3	2	11	15	31	−16	18.75
Total				565	226	148	191	791	704	+87	40.00

== Honours ==
=== Player ===
Necaxa

- Mexican Primera División: 1994–95, 1995–96
- Copa México: 1994–95
- Campeón de Campeones: 1995
- CONCACAF Cup Winners Cup: 1994

Mexico

- CONCACAF Gold Cup: 1993

=== Manager ===
América

- CONCACAF Champions League: 2015–16

Necaxa

- Copa MX: Clausura 2018

León

- Liga MX: Guardianes 2020

Individual

- Liga MX Best Manager: 2018–19
- Liga MX Best XI Manager: Guardianes 2020
- The Best of America Best Liga MX Manager: 2020
