= Leonel Bolsonello =

Brazilian footballer (born 1961)

Personal information
- Date of birth: August 4, 1966 (age 60)
- Place of birth: Brazil
- Position: Striker

Senior career*
Years	Team	Apps	(Gls)
–1987	Matsubara		
1988–1990	Passo Fundo		
1991–1992	Fluminense FC		
1992–1994	Pumas		
1994–1995	Veracruz		
1995–1996	FAS		
1996	Toluca		
1997	Zacatepec		
1997–1999	Venados		
1999	Toronto Lynx		
- * Club domestic league appearances and goals

Leonel Bolsonello (born 2 August 1966) is a Brazilian former footballer.

== Career ==
Bolsonello started his career with Brazilian side Matsubara. In 1988, he signed for Brazilian side Passo Fundo. In 1991, he signed for Brazilian side Fluminense FC. In 1992, he signed for Mexican side Pumas. He was initially regarded as a fan favorite. He scored eighteen goals in his first season while playing for the club. In 1994, he signed for Mexican side Veracruz. In 1995, he signed for Salvadoran side FAS. In 1996, he signed for Mexican side Toluca. In 1997, he signed for Mexican side Zacatepec. In 1999, he signed for Canadian side Toronto Lynx.

== Style of play ==
Bolsonello mainly operated as a striker. He was known for his shooting power.

== Personal life ==
After retiring from professional football, Bolsonello lived in Mexico City, Mexico and Passo Fundo, Brazil. He worked as a player agent.
