= Hans Westerhoff =

Dutch biologist and biochemist (born 1953)

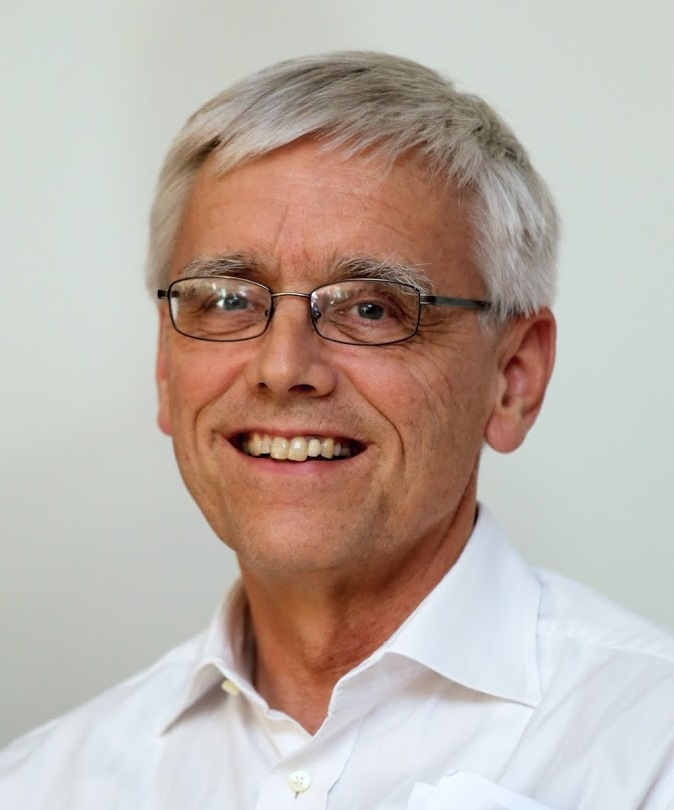
- Westerhoff in 2014
- Born: Hans Victor Westerhoff; 14 January 1953 (age 73); Amsterdam, The Netherlands
- Education: University of Amsterdam (PhD)
- Scientific career
- Fields: Biological thermodynamics, Systems biology
- Institutions: Vrije Universiteit Amsterdam; University of Manchester; University of Amsterdam
- Thesis: Mosaic non-equilibrium thermodynamics and (the control of) biological free-energy transduction (1983)
- Doctoral advisor: Karel van Dam
- Website: www.manchester.ac.uk/research/hans.westerhoff

Hans Victor Westerhoff (born 14 January 1953) is a Dutch biologist and biochemist who is professor of synthetic systems biology at the University of Amsterdam and AstraZeneca professor of systems biology at the University of Manchester. Currently he is a Chair of AstraZeneca and a director of the Manchester Centre for Integrative Systems Biology.

== Career ==
Westerhoff was born in Amsterdam, Netherlands. He was educated at the University of Amsterdam where he was awarded a PhD in 1983 for investigations of non-equilibrium thermodynamics and the control of biological thermodynamics supervised by Karel van Dam. In 1996 he succeeded Ad Stouthamer as professor of microbiology at the Vrije Universiteit Amsterdam.

== Research ==
At the beginning of his career Westerhoff worked in the area of non-equilibrium thermodynamics in relation to biological energy transduction. His work on this topic led to a book written with Karel Van Dam.

After being a coauthor of one of the first experimental papers to stimulate interest in metabolic control analysis and participating in the group that proposed a harmonized terminology, Westerhoff moved progressively towards working on multi-enzyme systems as his major activity, starting with an analysis of the effect of enzyme activity on metabolite concentrations. He published many papers in this area, of which one may note an analysis of the control of regulatory cascades, analysqis of glycolytic oscilations in yeast, and showing that the in vivo behaviour of Trypanosoma brucei agreed with the kinetic properties of the glycolytic enzymes.

Westerhoff and colleagues discovered magainin in the African clawed frog which helps it fight against bacteria. In December 1996 he and his group discovered a nitric-oxide reductase of Paracoccus denitrificans.

In conjunction with many other workers Westerhoff used a community approach to construct a consensus yeast metabolic network and subsequently applied the same approach to human metabolism.
