= Diego Bustos (footballer) =

Argentine footballer

Personal information
- Full name: Diego Daniel Bustos
- Date of birth: April 28, 1974 (age 52)
- Place of birth: Casilda, Argentina
- Position: Centre forward

Senior career*
Years	Team	Apps	(Gls)
1993–1995	Platense	37	(7)
1995	Veracruz	8	(0)
1995–1998	Ferro	88	(23)
1998–2000	Nantes	19	(0)
2000–2001	Argentinos Juniors	33	(8)
2001–2002	Lanús	35	(5)
2002–2003	Talleres	37	(6)
2003	Quilmes	7	(0)
2004	Emelec	?	(?)
- * Club domestic league appearances and goals

Diego Daniel Bustos (born April 28, 1974, in Casilda) is a former Argentine football forward who spent most of his career in Argentina.

In 1995, Bustos had a brief spell with Mexican Primera División side Veracruz.
