= Ivo Basay =

Chilean footballer (born 1966)

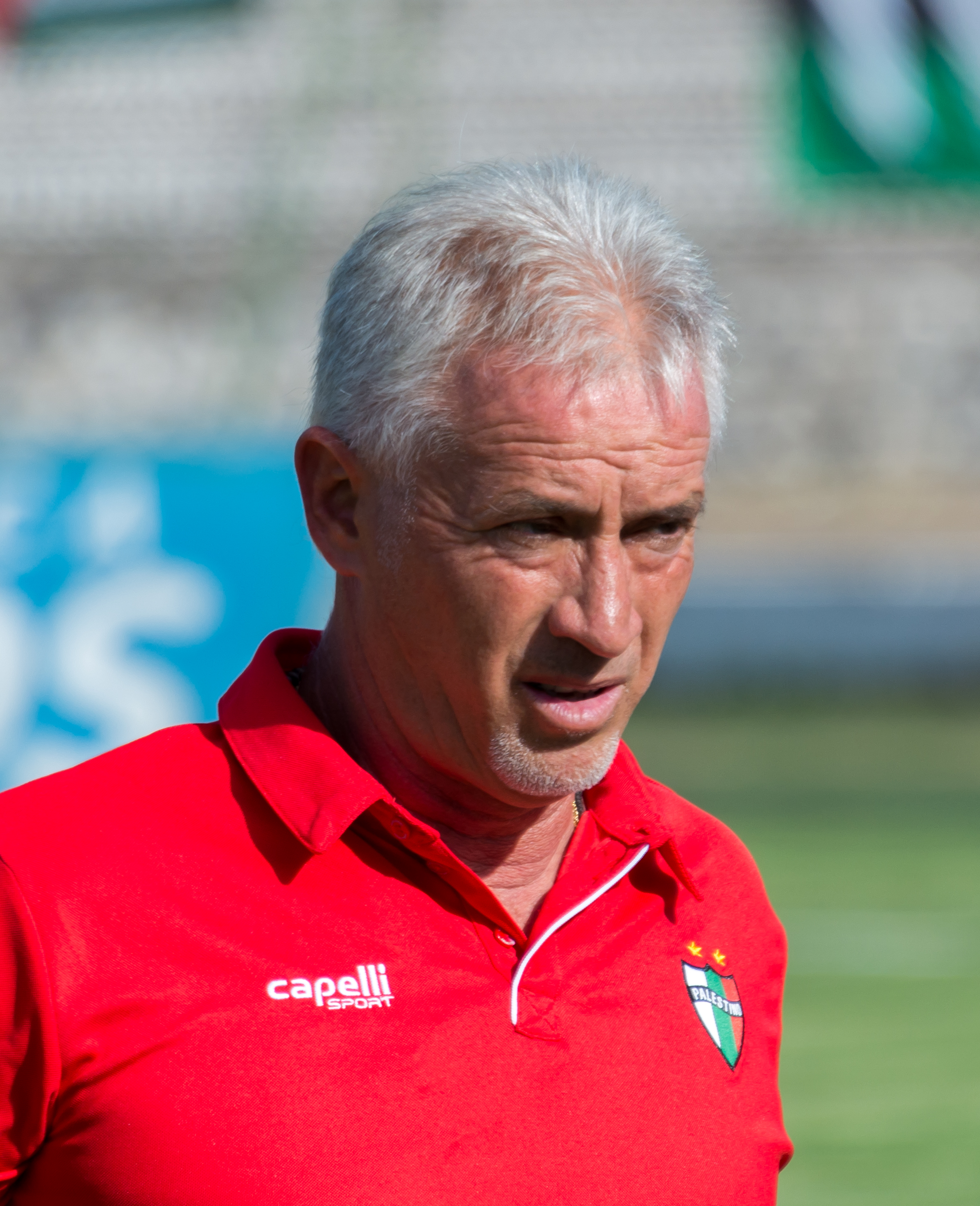
- Basay in 2019.

Personal information
- Full name: Ivo Alexie Basay Hatibović
- Date of birth: 13 April 1966 (age 60)
- Place of birth: Santiago, Chile
- Height: 1.75 m (5 ft 9 in)
- Position: Striker

Team information
- Current team: Rangers de Talca (manager)

Youth career
- Magallanes

Senior career*
Years	Team	Apps	(Gls)
1983–1986	Magallanes	32	(19)
1984	→ Curicó Unido (loan)	14	(5)
1986–1987	Everton	31	(12)
1987–1990	Stade Reims	68	(29)
1990–1995	Necaxa	172	(92)
1995	Boca Juniors	8	(4)
1996–1999	Colo-Colo	75	(38)
Total		400	(199)

International career
1986–1997	Chile	24	(6)

Managerial career
- 2005–2006: Santiago Morning
- 2007–2009: Chile U20
- 2010: Unión San Felipe
- 2011: O'Higgins
- 2011–2012: Colo-Colo
- 2012–2014: Santiago Wanderers
- 2014–2015: Ñublense
- 2018–2020: Palestino
- 2021–2022: Deportes La Serena
- 2023–2024: Deportes Copiapó
- 2025: Magallanes
- 2026–: Rangers de Talca
- * Club domestic league appearances and goals

Ivo Alexie Basay Hatibović (born 13 April 1966) is a Chilean football manager and former player who played as a striker. He is the current manager of Rangers de Talca.

Apart from being a regular choice for the Chile national football team in the late 1980s and early 1990s (24 caps, six goals), Basay played club football for Magallanes, Curicó Unido, Everton, Colo Colo, Stade Reims, Necaxa and Boca Juniors. He is of Bosniak descent.

On 12 April 2012, amid club president Hernan Levy's departure and head coach Basay's dismissal, Colo Colo looks to regain its confidence under interim head coach Luis Pérez.

== International career ==
=== International goals ===
Scores and results list Chile's goal tally first.

No	Date	Venue	Opponent	Score	Result	Competition
1.	19 June 1987	Estadio Nacional de Lima, Lima, Peru	Peru	2–1	3–1	Friendly
2.	3 July 1987	Estadio Olímpico Chateau Carreras, Córdoba, Argentina	Brazil	1–0	4–0	1987 Copa América
3.	3 July 1987	Estadio Olímpico Chateau Carreras, Córdoba, Argentina	Brazil	3–0	4–0	1987 Copa América
4.	13 August 1989	Estadio Nacional, Santiago, Chile	Brazil	1–1	1–1	1990 FIFA World Cup qualification
5.	14 July 1995	Estadio Parque Artigas, Paysandú, Uruguay	Bolivia	1–0	2–2	1995 Copa América
6.	14 July 1995	Estadio Parque Artigas, Paysandú, Uruguay	Bolivia	2–0	2–2	1995 Copa América

== Managerial career ==
In June 2025, Basay was appointed as the manager of Magallanes.

=== Managerial statistics ===
As of match played 17 August 2025

Managerial record by team and tenure
Team	Years	Record				
Team	Years	P	W	D	L	Win %
Santiago Morning	2005-2006	52	24	11	17	46.15
Chile Sub-20	2007-2009	23	11	3	9	47.83
Unión San Felipe	2010	24	8	6	10	33.33
O'Higgins	2011	33	12	9	12	36.36
Colo-Colo	2011-2012	27	13	5	9	48.15
Santiago Wanderers	2012-2014	64	23	15	26	35.94
Ñublense	2014-2015	30	11	6	13	36.67
Palestino	2018-2020	71	27	22	22	38.03
Deportes La Serena	2021-2022	22	5	8	9	22.73
Deportes Copiapó	2023–2024	38	11	9	18	28.95
Magallanes	2025	7	1	2	4	14.29
Total		391	146	96	149	37.34

== Personal life ==
During a radio interview with a Buenos Aires sports show, Basay declared his admiration of Chile's former dictator Augusto Pinochet. At the end of the interview Basay was asked rapid-fire, one-phrase questions. He was asked by the host of the Radio Sports Show "De Caño vale doble" of AM 770 Radio in Buenos Aires, what was his impression of Pinochet. Basay answered that Pinochet was necessary at a time in Chilean history.

Basay is of Croat descent.

After managing Ñublense in 2015, he decided to stop his activity in football to spend time with his grandson. In 2018, he returned to football after joining Canal del Fútbol (CDF) as a football commentator. In October of the same year, he left that work to manage Palestino.

== Honours ==
=== Club ===
==== As player ====
Necaxa

- Primera División: 1994–95
- Copa México: 1994–95
- CONCACAF Cup Winners Cup: 1994

Colo-Colo

- Primera División de Chile: 1996, 1997–C, 1998
- Copa Chile: 1996

Individual

- Mexican Primera División Golden Boot: 1992–93
- Mexican Primera División Golden Ball: 1992–93

==== As manager ====
Palestino

- Copa Chile : 2018
