= Alberto García Aspe =

Mexican footballer (born 1967)

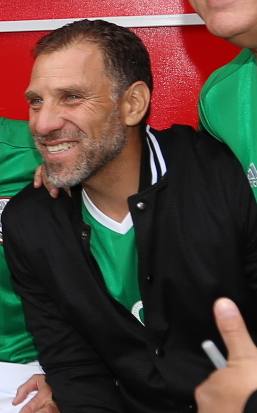

Personal information
- Full name: Alberto García Aspe Mena
- Date of birth: 11 May 1967 (age 59)
- Place of birth: Mexico City, Mexico
- Height: 1.69 m (5 ft 6 1/2 in)
- Position: Midfielder

Senior career*
Years	Team	Apps	(Gls)
1984–1991	Pumas UNAM	180	(40)
1991–1997	Necaxa	185	(69)
1995	→ River Plate (loan)	5	(0)
1997–1999	América	66	(11)
1999–2002	Puebla	97	(29)
Total		533	(149)

International career
1988–2002	Mexico	109	(21)
Medal record
Men's football
Representing Mexico
FIFA Confederations Cup
Winner	1999 Mexico
Third place	1995 Saudi Arabia
CONCACAF Gold Cup
Winner	1996 United States
Copa América
Runner-up	1993 Ecuador
Runner-up	2001 Colombia
Third place	1999 Paraguay
- * Club domestic league appearances and goals

Alberto García Aspe Mena (born 11 May 1967) is a Mexican former professional footballer who played as a midfielder.

Recognized for his character, discipline, and leadership, Aspe is regarded as one of the greatest Mexican footballers of all time. He is best remembered for his tenure with Pumas UNAM and later with Necaxa, during which the club experienced a remarkable era of success.

On the international stage, Aspe made 109 appearances for Mexico over a fourteen-year period, scoring 21 goals. He represented the national team at the FIFA World Cup in 1994, 1998 and 2002.

== Club career ==
Aspe made his professional debut in 1984 with Pumas UNAM in a match against Puebla. He won the 1990–91 league title, with Pumas defeating Club América in the final.

In 1991, Aspe was transferred to Necaxa, where he enjoyed the most successful period of his career, winning two consecutive league titles, the Copa México, the Campeón de Campeones and the CONCACAF Cup Winners Cup.

In 1995, Aspe had a short-lived loan spell with River Plate in Argentina. He left the club without making a significant impact.

Aspe joined Club América in 1997. He occasionally served as team captain, but the club experienced limited success during his tenure.

He concluded his professional career with Puebla in 2002.

== International career ==
García Aspe's international debut came on February 21, 1989, in an impressive 2–1 victory against Guatemala. He participated in 109 matches, scoring a total of 21 goals. In addition, he played in three FIFA World Cup tournaments: 1994, 1998 and 2002. He scored once in 1994 against Bulgaria and once in 1998 against Belgium, both from penalty kicks. In the 2002 FIFA World Cup, García Aspe only appeared in one game, playing twelve minutes in the Round of 16 defeat to the United States.

== After retirement ==
García Aspe was an executive of Pumas UNAM and is currently a commentator for Fox in Mexico.

== Honours ==
Pumas UNAM

- Mexican Primera División: 1990–91
- CONCACAF Champions' Cup: 1989

Necaxa

- Mexican Primera División: 1994–95, 1995–96
- Copa México: 1994–95
- Campeón de Campeones: 1995
- CONCACAF Cup Winners Cup: 1994

Mexico

- FIFA Confederations Cup: 1999
- CONCACAF Gold Cup: 1996

== Career statistics ==
=== International goals ===
Scores and results list Mexico's goal tally first.

Goal	Date	Venue	Opponent	Score	Result	Competition
1.	April 26, 1988	Estadio Marte R. Gómez, Ciudad Victoria, Mexico	Honduras	3–0	4–1	Friendly
2.	April 4, 1993	Estadio Cuscatlán, San Salvador, El Salvador	El Salvador	1–0	1–2	1994 FIFA World Cup qualification
3.	April 25, 1993	Estadio Azteca, Mexico City, Mexico	Canada	4–0	4–0	1994 FIFA World Cup qualification
4.	May 2, 1993	Estadio Tiburcio Carías Andino, Tegucigalpa, Honduras	Honduras	1–0	4–1	1994 FIFA World Cup qualification
5.	June 10, 1993	Estadio Azteca, Mexico City, Mexico	Paraguay	2–0	3–1	Friendly
6.	June 27, 1993	Estadio Olímpico Atahualpa, Quito, Ecuador	Peru	1–0	4–2	1993 Copa América
7.	June 27, 1993	Estadio Olímpico Atahualpa, Quito, Ecuador	Peru	3–0	4–2	1993 Copa América
8.	August 8, 1993	Estádio Rei Pelé, Maceió, Brazil	Brazil	1–1	1–1	Friendly
9.	February 2, 1994	Oakland–Alameda County Coliseum, Oakland, United States	Russia	1–1	1–4	Friendly
10.	July 5, 1994	Giants Stadium, East Rutherford, United States	Bulgaria	1–1	1–1 (p.s.o.)	1994 FIFA World Cup
11.	June 24, 1995	Cotton Bowl, Dallas, United States	Nigeria	1–1	2–1	1995 U.S. Cup
12.	May 18, 1996	Soldier Field, Chicago, United States	Slovakia	1–0	5–2	Friendly
13.	May 18, 1996	Soldier Field, Chicago, United States	Slovakia	3–1	5–2	Friendly
14.	January 19, 1997	Rose Bowl, Pasadena, United States	United States	2–0	2–0	1997 U.S. Cup
15.	October 15, 1997	Estadio Azteca, Mexico City, Mexico	El Salvador	2–0	5–0	1998 FIFA World Cup qualification
16.	February 24, 1998	Pro Player Stadium, Miami Gardens, United States	Netherlands	2–3	2–3	Friendly
17.	May 9, 1998	Stadio Enzo Mazotti, Montecatini Terme, Italy	Estonia	1–0	6–0	Friendly
18.	May 31, 1998	Stade olympique de la Pontaise, Lausanne, Switzerland	Japan	2–1	2–1	Friendly
19.	June 20, 1998	Stade Chaban-Delmas, Bordeaux, France	Belgium	1–2	2–2	1998 FIFA World Cup
20.	July 25, 2001	Estadio Hernán Ramírez Villegas, Pereira, Colombia	Uruguay	2–1	2–1	2001 Copa América
21.	September 5, 2001	Estadio Azteca, Mexico City, Mexico	Trinidad & Tobago	1–0	3–0	2002 FIFA World Cup qualification

== See also ==
- List of men's footballers with 100 or more international caps
