= 1994 CONCACAF Cup Winners Cup =

- Dates: 12 November 1993 – 4 December 1994

Final positions
- Champions: (Mexico) Necaxa (1st title)
- Runners-up: (Guatemala) Aurora
- Third place: (Honduras) Real Maya

The 1994 CONCACAF Cup Winners Cup was the third edition of this defunct tournament contended between 1991 and 1998.

== Preliminary round ==
=== Caribbean Zone ===
==== First round ====
12 November 1993

Lambada SC (Barbados)	1–0	(Martinique) Racing Club Saint-Joseph

Barbados National Stadium, Bridgetown
24 November 1993

Racing Club Saint-Joseph (Martinique)	1–1	(Barbados) Lambada SC

Stade Pierre-Aliker, Fort-de-France

Lambada SC qualified for Next Round

==== Second round ====
12 November 1993

SNL (Suriname)	0–0	(Guadeloupe) Olympique

24 November 1993

Olympique (Guadeloupe)	0–0 (5–4 pen.)	(Suriname) SNL

Olympique qualified for Next Round

5 December 1993

Malta Caribs (Trinidad and Tobago)	1–1	(Barbados) Lambada SC

Hasely Crawford Stadium, Port of Spain
12 December 1993

Lambada SC (Barbados)	2–1	(Trinidad and Tobago) Malta Caribs

Barbados National Stadium, Bridgetown

Lambada SC qualified for Next Round

== Bracket ==
Quarterfinals
(Guatemala)	Aurora	3
(El Salvador)	Atlético Marte	2
(Nicaragua)	Diriangén	0
(Honduras)	Real Maya	3
(Barbados)	Lambada	4
(Guadeloupe)	Olympique	0
(United States)	CD México	1
(Mexico)	Necaxa	5

Semifinals
(Guatemala)	Aurora	2
(Honduras)	Real Maya	1
(Barbados)	Lambada	1
(Mexico)	Necaxa	4

Finals
(Guatemala)	Aurora	0
(Mexico)	Necaxa	3
Third place
(Honduras)	Real Maya	1
(Barbados)	Lambada	0

== Quarterfinals ==
1993-11-21

Aurora (Guatemala)	2–0	(El Salvador) Atlético Marte

Estadio del Ejército, Guatemala City
1993-12-12

Atlético Marte (El Salvador)	2–1	(Guatemala) Aurora

Estadio Cuscatlán, San Salvador

Aurora qualified for Next Round

1993-11-28

Diriangén (Nicaragua)	0–1	(Honduras) Real Maya

Estadio Colegio La Salle, Diriamba
1993-12-04

Real Maya (Honduras)	2–0	(Nicaragua) Diriangén

Estadio Nacional Chelato Uclés, Tegucigalpa

Real Maya qualified for Next Round

1994-02-02

Lambada (Barbados)	3–0	(Guadeloupe) Olympique

Barbados National Stadium, Bridgetown
1994-02-09

Olympique (Guadeloupe)	0–1	(Barbados) Lambada

Stade René Serge Nabajoth, Les Abymes

Lambada qualified for Next Round

1994-03-01

CD México (United States)	1–5	(Mexico) Necaxa

CEFCU Stadium, San Jose

only one leg played

Necaxa qualified for Next Round

== Semifinals ==
1994-12-02

Aurora (Guatemala)	2–1	(Honduras) Real Maya

Miami Orange Bowl, Miami

1994-12-02

Lambada (Barbados)	1–4	(Mexico) Necaxa

Miami Orange Bowl, Miami

== Third place ==
1994-12-04

Lambada (Barbados)	0–1	(Honduras) Real Maya

Miami Orange Bowl, Miami

== Final ==
1994-12-04

Aurora (Guatemala)	0–3	(Mexico) Necaxa
		Aguinaga 9'; Sol 16'; Peláez 53'

Miami Orange Bowl, Miami

== Champion ==
CONCACAF Cup Winners' Cup
1994 Winners
(Mexico)
Necaxa
First title
