= 1994–95 Mexican Primera División season =

53rd professional season of the top-flight football league in Mexico

Primera División de México
- Season: 1994–95
- Champions: Necaxa (1st title)
- Relegated: Correcaminos; Tampico Madero
- CONCACAF Cup Winners Cup: Tecos
- Top goalscorer: Carlos Hermosillo (35 goals)

The following are statistics of Mexican Primera División, the premier football division in Mexico, for the 1994–95 season.

== Overview ==
It was contested by 19 teams, and Necaxa won the championship.

The U. de G. franchise briefly disappeared after being acquired by a few Primera Division A teams.

Tampico Madero was promoted from Segunda División. The team started the season playing in Tamaulipas, but on week 16, the team was moved to Querétaro and changed its name to TM Gallos Blancos, the owner cited leasing problems at his original venue.

TM Gallos Blancos and Correcaminos UAT were relegated to Primera División 'A', the new second-level league in the Mexican system. For the 1995–96 season, the number of participating teams was reduced to 18.

Toros Neza returned to Ciudad Nezahualcóyotl after one season playing in Pachuca.

=== Teams ===
Location of the 1994–95 Primera División teams

Team	City	Stadium
América	Mexico City	Azteca
Atlante	Mexico City	Azulgrana
Atlas	Guadalajara, Jalisco	Jalisco
Cruz Azul	Mexico City	Azteca
Guadalajara	Guadalajara, Jalisco	Jalisco
León	León, Guanajuato	Nou Camp
Morelia	Morelia, Michoacán	Morelos
Monterrey	Monterrey, Nuevo León	Tecnológico
Necaxa	Mexico City	Azteca
Toros Neza	Nezahualcóyotl, State of Mexico	Neza 86
Puebla	Puebla, Puebla	Cuauhtémoc
Santos Laguna	Torreón, Coahuila	Corona
Tampico Madero; TM Gallos Blancos	Tampico-Madero, Tamaulipas; Querétaro, Querétaro	Tamaulipas; Corregidora
Tecos	Zapopan, Jalisco	Tres de Marzo
Toluca	Toluca, State of Mexico	La Bombonera
UANL	Monterrey, Nuevo León	Universitario
UAT	Ciudad Victoria, Tamaulipas	Marte R. Gómez
UNAM	Mexico City	Olímpico Universitario
Veracruz	Veracruz, Veracruz	Luis "Pirata" Fuente

== Pre-season ==
=== Copa Pachuca ===
Source: RSSSF

Semi-finals
10 August – Estadio Hidalgo
Pachuca	0
América	1
11 August – Estadio Hidalgo
Cruz Azul	1
UNAM	2

Final
13 August – Estadio Hidalgo
UNAM	3
América	2
Third place
13 August – Estadio Hidalgo
Pachuca	1
Cruz Azul	2

== Regular season ==
=== Group 1 ===
Pos	Team	Pld	W	D	L	GF	GA	GD	Pts	Qualification
1	América	36	19	13	4	88	46	+42	51	Playoff
2	Necaxa	36	16	14	6	69	38	+31	46	Playoff
3	Tecos	36	14	14	8	50	47	+3	42	Playoff
4	Toros Neza	36	12	8	16	55	62	−7	32	
5	UANL	36	7	10	19	34	50	−16	24	

=== Group 2 ===
Pos	Team	Pld	W	D	L	GF	GA	GD	Pts	Qualification or relegation
1	Cruz Azul	36	20	8	8	91	45	+46	48	Playoff
2	Veracruz	36	12	11	13	43	51	−8	35	Playoff
3	Atlante	36	11	11	14	57	69	−12	33	
4	Morelia	36	9	12	15	54	75	−21	30	
5	Correcaminos	36	9	10	17	42	65	−23	28	Relegated

=== Group 3 ===
Pos	Team	Pld	W	D	L	GF	GA	GD	Pts	Qualification or relegation
1	Guadalajara	36	22	8	6	70	35	+35	52	Playoff
2	UNAM	36	15	11	10	49	36	+13	41	Playoff
3	Puebla	36	12	16	8	45	41	+4	40	Playoff
4	Toluca	36	10	8	18	44	57	−13	28	
5	Tampico Madero-TM Gallos	36	8	7	21	41	74	−33	23	Relegated

=== Group 4 ===
Pos	Team	Pld	W	D	L	GF	GA	GD	Pts	Qualification
1	Santos Laguna	36	13	9	14	61	62	−1	35	Playoff
2	Monterrey	36	9	15	12	37	52	−15	33	Playoff
3	Atlas	36	12	8	16	43	52	−9	32	
4	León	36	11	9	16	39	55	−16	31	

=== Overall Table ===
Pos	Team	Pld	W	D	L	GF	GA	GD	Pts	Qualification
1	Guadalajara	36	22	8	6	70	35	+35	52	Qualification for the quarter-finals (Note: The first four places in the table and teams ranked 6th and 8th qualified for the Liguilla quarter-finals.)
2	America	36	19	13	4	88	46	+42	51	Qualification for the quarter-finals
3	Cruz Azul	36	20	8	8	91	45	+46	48	Qualification for the quarter-finals
4	Necaxa	36	16	14	6	69	38	+31	46	Qualification for the quarter-finals
5	UAG (C)	36	14	14	8	50	47	+3	42	Qualification for the Repechaje (Note: Teams ranked 5th, 7th, 9th and 11th in the table qualified for Repechaje)
6	UNAM	36	15	11	10	49	36	+13	41	Qualification for the quarter-finals
7	Puebla	36	12	16	8	45	41	+4	40	Qualification for the Repechaje
8	Santos Laguna	36	13	9	14	61	62	−1	35	Qualification for the quarter-finals
9	Veracruz	36	12	11	13	43	51	−8	35	Qualification for the Repechaje
10	Atlante	36	11	11	14	57	69	−12	33	
11	Monterrey	36	9	15	12	37	52	−15	33	Qualification for the Repechaje
12	Toros Neza	36	12	8	16	55	62	−7	32	
13	Atlas	36	12	8	16	43	52	−9	32	
14	Leon	36	11	9	16	39	55	−16	31	
15	Morelia	36	9	12	15	54	75	−21	30	
16	Toluca	36	10	8	18	44	57	−13	28	
17	UAT	36	9	10	17	42	65	−23	28	
18	UANL	36	7	10	19	34	50	−16	24	
19	TM Gallos Blancos	36	8	7	21	41	74	−33	23	

Source: Liga MX
Rules for classification: 1) Points; 2) Goal difference; 3) Number of goals scored; 4) Head-to-head results between tied teams; 5) Number of goals scored away; 6) Highest relegation coefficient; 7) Fair Play points
(C) Champions

=== Results ===
Home \ Away	AME	ATE	ATS	CAZ	GDL	LEO	MTY	MOR	NEC	PUE	SAN	TEC	TMG	TOL	TRN	UNL	UAT	UNM	VER
América	—	1–4	0–1	3–1	0–0	1–0	2–1	7–3	1–2	2–2	2–1	2–1	4–0	1–1	4–1	2–1	8–1	3–1	1–1
Atlante	2–2	—	2–2	3–1	1–1	3–2	1–2	4–1	0–3	3–1	3–2	2–2	2–1	0–0	1–1	2–1	3–1	0–2	0–2
Atlas	1–2	0–1	—	2–1	0–1	2–0	2–2	1–1	0–3	1–1	1–3	1–1	1–0	2–3	3–1	1–2	4–0	1–0	1–2
Cruz Azul	1–1	4–1	4–0	—	0–1	6–0	6–0	1–3	1–1	2–1	5–2	3–3	4–1	2–0	5–2	5–1	3–2	0–1	3–1
Guadalajara	3–4	4–1	2–1	3–1	—	2–1	2–1	2–0	4–0	0–0	3–1	2–3	1–0	2–0	2–1	1–1	3–1	1–1	5–0
León	0–2	0–0	2–0	1–1	0–4	—	1–0	2–5	0–4	1–0	1–0	1–2	3–0	2–2	1–1	2–0	0–0	2–0	3–0
Monterrey	1–1	1–1	0–1	2–2	1–2	0–0	—	2–1	1–1	1–1	1–1	0–0	2–1	3–0	0–1	1–0	1–1	1–0	0–0
Morelia	1–6	2–1	4–1	2–3	2–2	2–3	1–2	—	0–0	0–2	2–2	1–1	4–2	1–2	1–3	2–1	3–2	6–2	0–0
Necaxa	4–4	7–0	2–2	0–0	1–1	1–0	6–0	2–2	—	1–2	1–1	2–1	2–3	1–0	1–3	1–0	5–1	2–1	2–0
Puebla	1–1	6–6	1–1	1–1	1–0	2–1	0–0	1–1	0–4	—	2–0	3–2	4–0	1–0	2–1	0–0	2–1	0–0	1–0
Santos	2–0	2–2	2–1	2–5	3–2	2–1	1–0	2–0	0–2	1–1	—	3–0	1–1	2–2	4–1	2–1	4–0	1–3	3–2
Tecos	1–3	2–1	2–0	0–2	1–0	1–1	2–2	0–0	1–1	3–1	2–1	—	3–0	1–1	2–1	0–0	1–1	1–1	3–2
Tampico Madero	2–8	1–1	1–3	0–2	0–1	0–1	4–1	4–0	2–2	1–0	4–2	0–1	—	2–0	3–0	2–1	1–1	0–3	1–1
Toluca	0–3	4–2	1–2	0–4	1–2	1–0	2–0	1–2	1–2	2–0	4–2	1–2	3–0	—	0–1	1–3	4–2	2–1	1–2
Toros Neza	1–1	2–3	1–2	3–3	1–2	1–2	1–1	5–0	1–1	1–3	1–0	1–1	3–1	3–1	—	3–0	2–1	2–1	2–3
UANL	1–1	2–0	0–1	0–1	2–2	1–1	1–2	1–1	1–1	1–1	1–0	0–2	4–1	1–1	4–0	—	1–0	0–1	0–2
UAT	0–2	1–0	3–1	0–3	3–1	4–1	1–1	0–0	2–0	1–1	1–0	1–2	0–0	2–2	2–1	2–0	—	0–0	1–0
UNAM	0–0	2–1	1–0	2–1	0–2	3–3	3–0	5–0	1–1	1–0	1–1	3–0	3–0	0–0	1–1	2–1	2–1	—	1–2
Veracruz	3–3	1–0	0–0	0–4	1–4	2–0	2–4	0–0	1–0	0–0	3–3	3–0	2–2	1–0	0–1	3–0	1–2	0–0	—

Updated to match(es) played on 7 May 1995. Source: RSSSF
Legend: Blue = home team win; Yellow = draw; Red = away team win.

=== Relegation table ===
Pos.	Team	Pts.	Pld.	Ave.	GD.
1.	UAG	141	112	1.259	-40
15.	Morelia	99	112	0.8839	-40
16.	UANL	98	112	0.8750	-35
17.	Toros Neza	63	74	0.8514	-30
18.	UAT	79	112	0.7054	-64
19.	TM Gallos Blancos	23	36	0.6389	-33

== Playoffs ==
=== Repechaje round ===
- If the two teams are tied after two legs, the higher-seeded team advances.

Repechaje					Qualifiers
5	Tecos	0	2	2
11	Monterrey	2	0	2	5	Tecos
7	Puebla	1	0	1	7	Puebla
9	Veracruz	1	0	1

May 10, 1995
16:00

Veracruz	1–1	Puebla
Durán 55'		Cuevas 24'

Estadio Luis "Pirata" Fuente, Veracruz
May 13, 1995
20:00

Puebla	0–0	Veracruz

Estadio Cuauhtémoc, Puebla

Series tied 1–1 on aggregate. Puebla advanced as higher-seeded team.

May 10, 1995
20:45

Monterrey	2–0	Tecos
Jáuregui 4'; Patiño 85'

Estadio Tecnológico, Monterrey
May 13, 1995
20:30

Tecos	2–0	Monterrey
Ordiales 33'; Malibrán 81'

Estadio Tres de Marzo, Zapopan

Series tied 2–2 on aggregate. Tecos advanced as higher-seeded team.

=== Playoff round ===
Quarter-finals
2	América	0	4	4
7	Puebla	0	2	2
3	Cruz Azul	0	1	1
6	UNAM	1	0	1
1	Guadalajara (a)	1	2	3
8	Santos Laguna	3	0	3
4	Necaxa	2	2	4
5	Tecos	0	1	1

Semi-finals
2	América	1	1	2
3	Cruz Azul	1	2	3
1	Guadalajara	0	1	1
4	Necaxa (a)	0	1	1

Final
3	Cruz Azul	1	0	1
4	Necaxa	1	2	3

==== Quarter-finals ====
May 17, 1995
16:00

Santos Laguna	3-1	Guadalajara
Asprilla 8', 65'; Adomaitis 79'		Guzmán 15'

Estadio Corona, Torreón
May 20, 1995
20:45

Guadalajara	2-0	Santos Laguna
Espinoza 50'; Guzmán 85'

Estadio Jalisco, Guadalajara

Series tied 3–3 on aggregate. Guadalajara advanced to semi-finals by away goals rule.

May 18, 1995
20:30

Tecos	0-2	Necaxa
		Ivo Basay 32'; García Aspe 81'

Estadio Tres de Marzo, Zapopan
May 21, 1995
12:00

Necaxa	2-1	Tecos
Ambríz 57'; Higareda 87'		Malibrán 74'

Estadio Azteca, Mexico City

Necaxa won 4–1 on aggregate.

May 16, 1995
20:30

Puebla	0-0	América

Estadio Cuauhtémoc, Puebla
May 19, 1995
12:00

América	4-2	Puebla
Luis García 35', 70'; Oman-Biyik 75'; Zague 88'		Fernández 14'; Cuevas 58'

Estadio Azteca, Mexico City

America won 4–2 on aggregate.

May 17, 1995
20:30

UNAM	1-0	Cruz Azul
García 53'

Estadio Olímpico Universitario, Mexico City
May 20, 1995
17:00

Cruz Azul	1-0	UNAM
Castañeda 90+2'

Estadio Azteca, Mexico City

Aggregate tied 1-1. Cruz Azul advanced to semi-finals as best seeded team.

==== Semi-finals ====
May 24, 1995
20:45

Necaxa	0-0	Guadalajara

Estadio Azteca, Mexico City
May 27, 1995
20:45

Guadalajara	1-1	Necaxa
Martínez 23'		García Aspe 7'

Estadio Jalisco, Guadalajara

Aggregate tied 1-1. Necaxa advanced to final by away goals rule.

May 25, 1995
17:00

Cruz Azul	1-1	América
Oliveira 9'		del Olmo 1'

Estadio Azteca, Mexico City
May 29, 1995
12:00

América	1-2	Cruz Azul
Zague 76'		Hermosillo 25'; Mora 30'

Estadio Azteca, Mexico City

Cruz Azul won 2–3 on aggregate.

==== Final ====
June 1, 1995
20:45

Necaxa	1-1	Cruz Azul
Basay 21'		Hermosillo 44'

Estadio Azteca, Mexico City
Referee: Armando Archundia
June 4, 1995
17:00

Cruz Azul	0-2	Necaxa
		Aguinaga 29'; Basay 83'

Estadio Azteca, Mexico City
Referee: Arturo Brizio

Necaxa won 3–1 on aggregate.

1994–95 winners

1st title
