= Álex Aguinaga =

Ecuadorian footballer (born 1969)

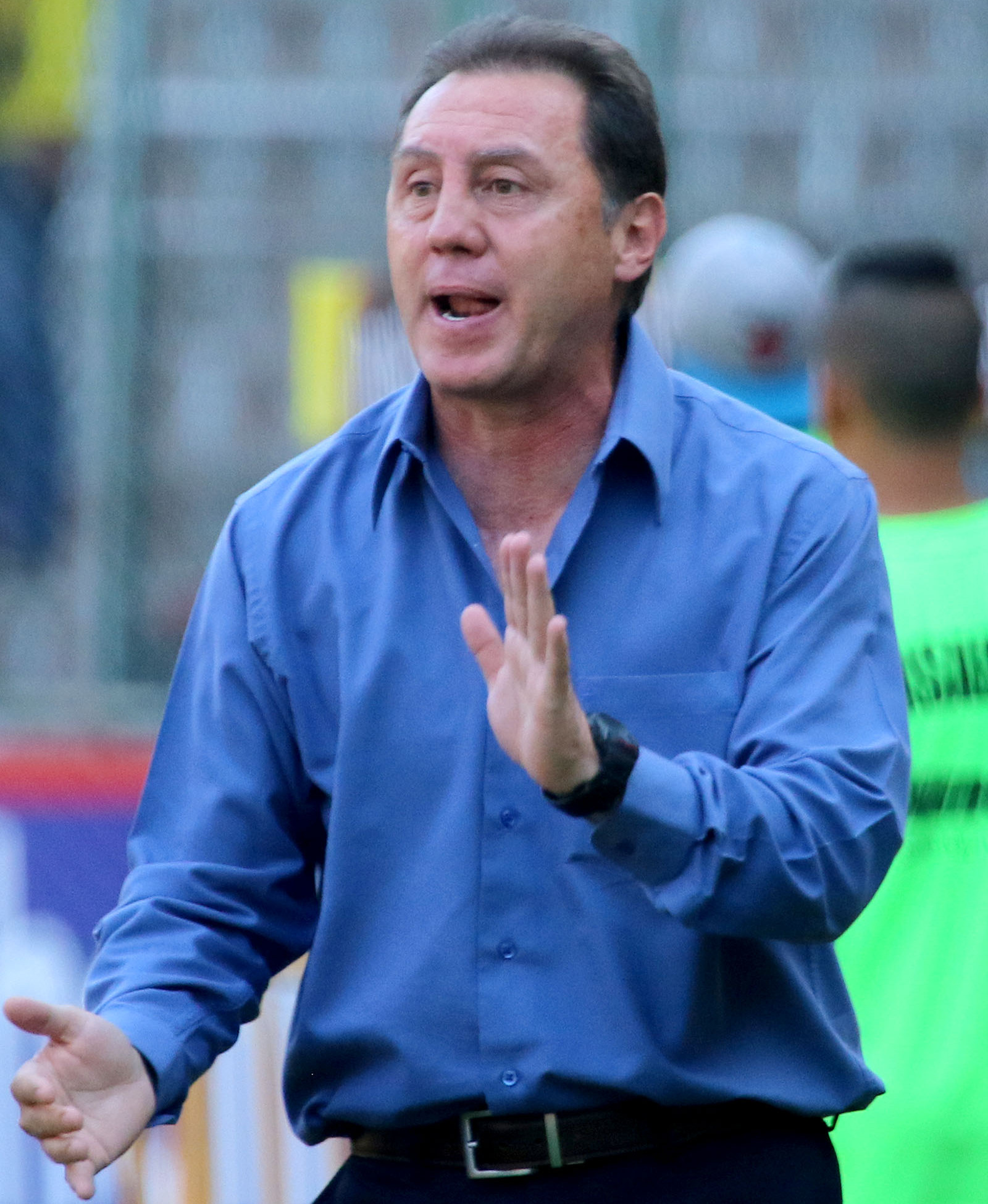
- Aguinaga coaching Deportivo Cuenca in 2015

Personal information
- Full name: Alex Darío Aguinaga Garzón
- Date of birth: 9 July 1969 (age 57)
- Place of birth: Ibarra, Ecuador
- Height: 1.72 m (5 ft 8 in)
- Position: Midfielder

Senior career*
Years	Team	Apps	(Gls)
1984–1989	Deportivo Quito	147	(38)
1989–2003	Necaxa	476	(85)
2003–2004	Cruz Azul	14	(0)
2004–2005	LDU Quito	71	(9)
Total		708	(132)

International career
1987–2004	Ecuador	109	(23)

Managerial career
- 2011: América (assistant)
- 2011: Barcelona SC
- 2012: San Luis
- 2013–2014: LDU Loja
- 2014–2015: Correcaminos UAT
- 2015–2016: Deportivo Cuenca
- 2016: LDU Quito
- * Club domestic league appearances and goals

Álex Darío Aguinaga Garzón (Spanish pronunciation: [ˈaleks aɣiˈnaɣa], born 9 July 1969) is an Ecuadorian former professional football player and manager. A midfielder during his playing career, he is one of the all-time cap leaders for Ecuador with 109 matches, scoring 23 goals. Aguinaga is known as one of the best Ecuadorian men's footballers of all time. On the club level, Aguinaga has played for Deportivo Quito, Necaxa, Cruz Azul and LDU Quito.

== Club career ==
=== Necaxa ===
Aguinaga spent the majority of his club career at Necaxa, which he joined in 1989, winning three championships with the club. In 1999 Aguinaga was crucial for Necaxa's first CONCACAF Champions Cup title. Necaxa would go on to participate in the first edition of the FIFA Club World Cup where in the group stage Aguinaga scored against Vasco da Gama, but missed a penalty against Manchester United. He scored in the penalty shootout against Real Madrid in the third place match.

He also holds a Mexican passport. His grandfather is of Spanish descent.

=== LDU Quito ===
After winning a league title in Ecuador, Aguinaga decided to retire from football.

== International career ==
Aguinaga earned his first cap for Ecuador on 5 March 1987. In the same match, he scored his first goal for the team. Over the year, he would form an integral part of the national team. He would captain the team for a number of years and assisted in the goal by Iván Kaviedes that assured Ecuador's first qualification to the FIFA World Cup in 2002, in which he played. This was the only World Cup where Aguinaga participated.

== Managerial career ==
Aguinaga's managerial career began in late 2010 as an assistant to Manuel Lapuente at Mexican club América. He left the club in early 2011 when Lapuente was sacked. In March of the same year, he was named to his first full-time managerial post as the new manager of Guayaquil-based club Barcelona following the sacking of Rubén Darío Insúa. In late May of the same year, he resigned from his position to not interfere and influence the club's presidential elections the following month. He has not ruled out a return after the election.

In September 2014, Aguinaga became the manager of Correcaminos UAT, which plays in the Ascenso MX second professional level league of the Mexican football league system.

== Personal life ==
Aguinaga's daughter Cristiane is an actress and has appeared in several Mexican series and telenovelas such as Carita de Ángel and La rosa de Guadalupe.

== Career statistics ==
Scores and results list Ecuador's goal tally first, score column indicates score after each Aguinaga goal.

List of international goals scored by Álex Aguinaga
No.	Date	Venue	Opponent	Score	Result	Competition
1	5 March 1987	Estadio Pedro Marrero, Havana, Cuba	Cuba	1–2	1–2	Friendly
2	7 June 1988	Albuquerque Sports Stadium, Albuquerque, New Mexico, United States	United States	1–0	1–0	Friendly
3	10 June 1988	Unknown, Houston, Texas, United States	United States	1–0	2–0	Friendly
4	15 June 1988	Estadio Francisco Morazán, San Pedro Sula, Honduras	Honduras	1–1	1–1	Friendly
5	24 September 1989	Estadio Monumental de Barcelona, Guayaquil, Ecuador	Paraguay	1–1	3–1	1990 FIFA World Cup qualification
6	30 June 1991	Estadio Nacional, Santiago, Chile	Chile	1–3	1–3	Friendly
7	9 July 1991	Estadio Sausalito, Viña del Mar	Uruguay	1–0	1–1	1991 Copa América
8	13 July 1991	Estadio Sausalito, Viña del Mar	Bolivia	1–0	4–0	1991 Copa América
9	15 June 1993	Estadio Olímpico Atahualpa, Quito, Ecuador	Venezuela	6–1	6–1	1993 Copa América
10	22 June 1993	Estadio Olímpico Atahualpa, Quito, Ecuador	Uruguay	2–1	2–1	1993 Copa América
11	6 July 1996	Estadio Nacional, Santiago, Chile	Chile	1–1	1–4	1998 FIFA World Cup qualification
12	1 September 1996	Estadio Olímpico Atahualpa, Quito, Ecuador	Venezuela	1–0	1–0	1998 FIFA World Cup qualification
13	12 February 1997	Estadio Olímpico Atahualpa, Quito, Ecuador	Uruguay	1–0	4–0	1998 FIFA World Cup qualification
14	2 April 1997	Estadio Nacional, Lima, Peru	Peru	1–1	1–1	1998 FIFA World Cup qualification
15	30 April 1997	Estadio Monumental Antonio Vespucio Liberti, Buenos Aires, Argentina	Argentina	1–2	1–2	1998 FIFA World Cup qualification
16	20 August 1997	Estadio Olímpico Atahualpa, Quito, Ecuador	Paraguay	1–1	2–1	1998 FIFA World Cup qualification
17	10 September 1997	Estádio Fonte Nova, Salvador, Brazil	Brazil	1–3	2–4	Friendly
18	29 March 2000	Estadio Casa Blanca, Quito, Ecuador	Venezuela	2–0	2–0	2002 FIFA World Cup qualification
19	26 April 2000	Estádio Cícero Pompeu de Toledo (Morumbi), São Paulo, Brazil	Brazil	1–0	2–3	2002 FIFA World Cup qualification
20	22 January 2002	Miami Orange Bowl, Miami, United States	Canada	1–0	2–0	2002 CONCACAF Gold Cup
21	22 January 2002	Miami Orange Bowl, Miami, United States	Canada	2–0	2–0	2002 CONCACAF Gold Cup
22	20 November 2002	Estadio Olímpico Atahualpa, Quito, Ecuador	Costa Rica	1–2	2–2	Friendly
23	2 June 2003	Estadio Bellavista, Ambato, Ecuador	Guatemala	2–0	2–0	Friendly

== Honors ==
Necaxa

- Primera División: 1994–95, 1995–96, 1998 Invierno
- CONCACAF Cup Winners Cup: 1994
- Mexican Cup: 1995
- Campeón de Campeones: 1995
- CONCACAF Champions' Cup: 1999
- FIFA Club World Cup third place: 2000

LDU Quito

- Serie A: 2005 Apertura

Ecuador

- Canada Cup: 1999

Individual

- Ideal team of South America: 1989
- Number 7 retired by Club Necaxa as a recognition to his contribution to the club.

== See also ==
- List of men's footballers with 100 or more international caps
