= Ricardo Peláez =

Mexican football player and executive (born 1963)

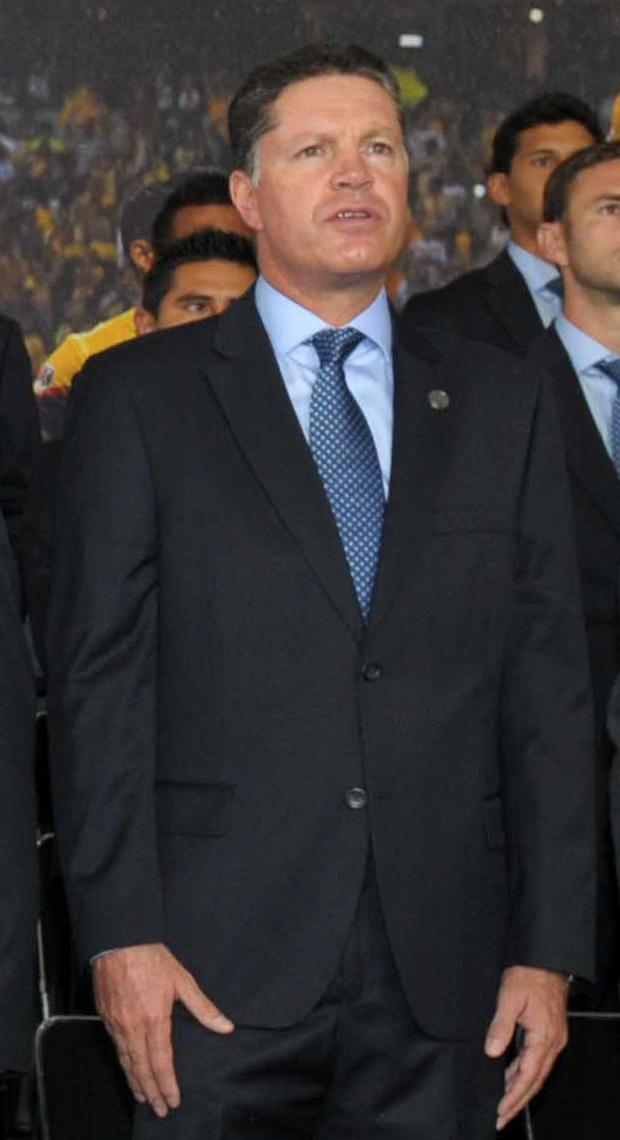
- Peláez in 2013

Personal information
- Full name: Ricardo Peláez Linares
- Date of birth: 14 March 1963 (age 63)
- Place of birth: Mexico City, Mexico
- Height: 1.87 m (6 ft 1 1/2 in)
- Position: Striker

Senior career*
Years	Team	Apps	(Gls)
1985–1987	América	17	(8)
1987–1997	Necaxa	352	(138)
1997–1998	América	33	(17)
1998–2000	Guadalajara	42	(15)
Total		444	(171)

International career
1989–1999	Mexico	43	(16)
- * Club domestic league appearances and goals

Ricardo Peláez Linares (born 14 March 1963) is a Mexican former professional footballer who currently works for ESPN Deportes and ESPN Mexico as an analyst.

Peláez began his professional career with Club América, subsequently transferring to Necaxa two years later. He emerged as a pivotal player for the team, amassing more than 300 appearances and netting 158 goals, which established him as the club's all-time top scorer. He had a short return to Club América before concluding his career at Guadalajara. Peláez represented the Mexico national team at the 1998 FIFA World Cup.

Following his retirement, Peláez has assumed the role of football executive and sports analyst.

== Club career ==
Ricardo Peláez Linares started his career as an accountant. After finishing his studies in accounting, Ricardo started to work doing public accountancy which he believed was something extremely boring and tiresome. Football being his hobby and passion, he decided to go for trials at Club América. He was 23 when the club headhunters recognized his talents and decided to place him in the first team.

He made his debut with Club America in 1985, winning the Prode 85 title.

His best years came with Necaxa, with whom he won the league twice, in 1994-95 and 1995-96. He also won the Campeón de Campeones in 1994-95 and the Campeón de Copa in 1995-96. All of this led to Necaxa being named Team of the Decade.

Pelaez scored 158 goals for Necaxa, many of them headers (his best quality), making him the club's all-time leading scorer. After a brief return to Club América between 1997 and 1998, Peláez decided to join Guadalajara, with whom he finished as runner-up to Necaxa in the Torneo Invierno 98. He retired from professional football in 2000.

== International career ==
Peláez was part of the Mexico national team at the 1998 FIFA World Cup, scoring two goals in the tournament. Peláez scored the equalizer against South Korea in a 3–1 win. Peláez scored his second goal of the tournament in a 2–2 draw against the Netherlands. Overall Peláez capped 43 times for Mexico and scored 16 goals.

=== International goals ===
#	Date	Venue	Opponent	Score	Result	Competition
1.	August 10, 1989	Los Angeles Memorial Coliseum, Los Angeles, United States	South Korea	1–0	4–2	1989 Los Angeles Cup
2.	August 10, 1989	Los Angeles Memorial Coliseum, Los Angeles, United States	South Korea	2–0	4–2	1989 Los Angeles Cup
3.	August 10, 1989	Los Angeles Memorial Coliseum, Los Angeles, United States	South Korea	3–0	4–2	1989 Los Angeles Cup
4.	August 10, 1989	Los Angeles Memorial Coliseum, Los Angeles, United States	South Korea	4–2	4–2	1989 Los Angeles Cup
5.	March 20, 1990	Los Angeles Memorial Coliseum, Los Angeles, United States	Uruguay	2–0	2–1	Friendly
6.	April 17, 1990	Los Angeles Memorial Coliseum, Los Angeles, United States	Colombia	2–0	2–0	Friendly
7.	January 11, 1996	Jack Murphy Stadium, San Diego, United States	Saint Vincent	1–0	5–0	1996 CONCACAF Gold Cup
8.	January 11, 1996	Jack Murphy Stadium, San Diego, United States	Saint Vincent	4–0	5–0	1996 CONCACAF Gold Cup
9.	May 29, 1996	Hakatanomori Football Stadium, Hakata-ku, Japan	Japan	2–0	2–3	1996 Kirin Cup
10.	September 15, 1996	Arnos Vale Stadium, Kingstown, Saint Vincent and the Grenadines	Saint Vincent	1–0	3–0	1998 FIFA World Cup qualification
11.	September 15, 1996	Arnos Vale Stadium, Kingstown, Saint Vincent and the Grenadines	Saint Vincent	2–0	3–0	1998 FIFA World Cup qualification
12.	November 20, 1996	Los Angeles Memorial Coliseum, Los Angeles, United States	El Salvador	2–0	3–1	Friendly
13.	May 20, 1998	Bislett Stadium, Oslo, Norway	Norway	1–2	2–5	Friendly
14.	May 20, 1998	Bislett Stadium, Oslo, Norway	Norway	2–4	2–5	Friendly
15.	June 13, 1998	Stade de Gerland, Lyon, France	South Korea	1–1	3–1	1998 FIFA World Cup
16.	June 25, 1998	Stade Geoffroy-Guichard, Saint-Étienne, France	Netherlands	1–2	2–2	1998 FIFA World Cup

== Executive ==
=== Club América ===
On 8 November 2011, following the departure of Michel Bauer as president, Peláez was named the new Sporting President of Club América as part of a complete organizational restructuring. His first act as president was the signing of Miguel Herrera as the club's new manager.

A year prior to the 2014 FIFA World Cup, he was appointed Sporting Director of the Mexico national team, later returning to Club América at the end of the tournament. He left his role as Sporting President in April 2017.

Under Peláez's leadership, Club América consistently achieved qualification for the playoffs, reaching the finals four times and securing two league titles, in addition to two CONCACAF Champions Cup titles.

=== Cruz Azul ===
Peláez was announced as Director of Football for Cruz Azul on 7 May 2018, replacing Eduardo de la Torre. Peláez signed a two-year contract with the club and was presented on 9 May 2018. In his first season with Cruz Azul, the team reached the Copa MX final, defeating Monterrey 2–0 to win the cup.

=== Guadalajara ===
Following much speculation, Peláez was announced as Guadalajara's new Director of Football beginning in the 2020 Clausura. On October 11, 2022 Chivas terminated the contract of sporting director Ricardo Pelaez after a 5-4 loss on penalties to Puebla in the first round of the Liga MX playoffs.

== Outside football ==
In 2004, Peláez became a commentator for football matches on Mexican television station Televisa. Peláez has also lent his voice alongside commentator Enrique Bermúdez to be the Spanish language commentators for the FIFA videogames for the editions from 2006 to 2012.

From September 2017 until May 2018, he worked as an analyst for ESPN Deportes and ESPN Mexico.

== Honours ==
América

- Mexican Primera División: Prode-85

Necaxa

- Mexican Primera División: 1994–95, 1995–96
- Copa México: 1994–95
- CONCACAF Cup Winners' Cup: 1994
- Campeón de Campeones: 1995

Mexico

- CONCACAF Gold Cup: 1996
