= Octavio Becerril =

Mexican footballer (born 1964)

Personal information
- Full name: Octavio Becerril Morales
- Date of birth: 31 March 1964 (age 62)
- Place of birth: Azcapotzalco, Mexico City, Mexico
- Height: 1.89 m (6 ft 2 in)
- Position: Defender

Youth career
- –1985: Deportivo Toluca

Senior career*
Years	Team	Apps	(Gls)
1985–1991	Deportivo Toluca	165	(5)
1991–1994	Veracruz	97	(0)
1994–2000	Club Necaxa	139	(1)
Total		401	(6)

International career
1988–1996	Mexico	12	(0)

Managerial career
- 2003: Club Necaxa (assistant)
- 2003: Correcaminos UAT
- 2004: Club Necaxa (assistant)
- 2004: Alacranes de Durango
- 2005–2006: Club Necaxa (assistant)
- 2007: Alacranes de Durango
- 2008–2009: Club Necaxa (assistant)
- 2008: Club Necaxa (interim)
- 2011: C.D. Irapuato (assistant)
- 2012–2013: Veracruz (assistant)
- 2013: Lobos BUAP (assistant)
- 2014–2015: Atlético Zacatepec (assistant)
- 2017–2020: Club Puebla (assistant)
- 2019: Club Puebla (interim)
- 2023: UAT (assistant)
- * Club domestic league appearances and goals

Octavio Becerril Morales (born 31 March 1964) is a Mexican former footballer who played as a defender.

== Career statistics ==
=== International ===
National team	Year	Apps	Goals
Mexico	1988	1	0
Mexico	1990	2	0
Mexico	1991	5	0
Mexico	1996	4	0
Total		12	0

== Managerial statistics ==
Managerial record by team and tenure
Team	From	To	Record				
Team	From	To	P	W	D	L	Win %
Correcaminos UAT	2003	2003	9	3	2	4	33.3
Club Necaxa	2008	2008	5	2	2	1	40.0
Total			14	5	4	5	35.7
