= 1970 in association football =

The following are the football (soccer) events of the year 1970 throughout the world.

== Events ==
- Copa Libertadores 1970: Won by Estudiantes de La Plata after defeating Peñarol on an aggregate score of 1–0.
- European Cup 1970: Won by Feyenoord after defeating Celtic FC by 2–1.
- In May 1970 the England captain Bobby Moore was arrested in Colombia in the Bogotá Bracelet incident shortly before the beginning of the World Cup.
- Paris Saint Germain (Paris, France) was founded.
- World Cup 1970 Brazil wins the world cup 1970

== Winners club national championship ==
=== Asia ===
- Qatar: Al-Oruba

=== Europe ===
- East Germany: FC Carl Zeiss Jena
- England: Everton
- France: AS Saint-Étienne
- Hungary: Újpest FC
- Italy: Cagliari
- Netherlands: Ajax Amsterdam
- Portugal: Sporting CP
- Scotland: Celtic
- Spain: Atlético Madrid
- Turkey: Fenerbahçe
- West Germany: Borussia Mönchengladbach

=== North America ===
- Mexico
  - Guadalajara
  - Cruz Azul (México 1970)
- United States / Canada:
  - Rochester Lancers (NASL)

=== South America ===
- Argentina
  - Boca Juniors – Metropolitano
  - Independiente – Nacional
- Brazil: Fluminense

== International tournaments ==
- African Cup of Nations in Sudan (February 6 – 16 1970)
  1. Sudan
  2. Ghana
  3. Egypt
- 1970 British Home Championship (April 18 – April 25, 1970)

Shared by England, Scotland and Wales

- FIFA World Cup in Mexico (May 31 – June 21, 1970)
  1. Brazil
  2. Italy
  3. West Germany
- 1970 Asian Games in Thailand (10–20 December 1970)
- (gold) South Korea
- (silver) Burma
- (bronze) India

== Births ==
- January 1 – Sergei Kiriakov, Russian footballer and manager
- January 6 – Francisco Rotllán, Mexican footballer
- January 10 – Geovanis Cassiani, Colombian footballer
- January 12 – Jorge Castañeda Reyes, Mexican footballer
- January 13 – Frank Kooiman, Dutch footballer
- January 21 – Alen Bokšić, Croatian footballer
- January 24 – Daniel Telser, retired Liechtenstein footballer
- February 2 – Erik ten Hag, Dutch football player and coach
- February 4 – Kevin Campbell, English footballer (died 2024)
- February 16 – Angelo Peruzzi, Italian footballer
- February 17 – José Antonio Castillo, Spanish retired footballer
- February 27 – Alexander Quirin, retired German footballer
- March 8 – Harry Decheiver, Dutch footballer
- March 12 – Clay Coleman, Caymanian footballer
- March 30
  - Rodrigo Barrera, Chilean footballer
  - Camilo Romero, Mexican footballer
- April 4 – Barry van Galen, Dutch footballer
- April 18 – Carlos López de Silanes, Mexican footballer
- April 28 – Diego Simeone, Argentinian footballer
- May 10 – David Weir, Scottish footballer
- May 13 – Fernando Vergara, Chilean footballer and manager
- June 1
  - Daniel Delfino, Argentine footballer
  - Alexi Lalas, American soccer player
- June 11 – Miguel Ramírez, Chilean footballer
- June 16 – Cobi Jones, American soccer player
- June 18 – Mark Chung, American soccer player
- June 19 – Cafú, Brazilian footballer
- July 6 – Christer Fursth, Swedish footballer
- July 11 – Iván Castillo, Bolivian footballer
- August 13 – Alan Shearer, English footballer
- August 16 – Mauricio Pozo, Chilean footballer
- August 20 – Celso Ayala, Paraguayan footballer
- August 24 – Guido Alvarenga, Paraguayan footballer
- August 27 – Walter Müller, retired Swiss footballer
- August 28 – Mike Lapper, American soccer player
- September 3 – Gareth Southgate, English footballer
- September 26 – Marco Etcheverry, Bolivian footballer
- October 1 – Gaston Taument, Dutch footballer
- October 16 – Mehmet Scholl, German footballer
- October 17 – Radoslav Samardzic, Serbian footballer
- October 22 – Winston Bogarde, Dutch footballer
- October 29 – Juan Castillo Balcázar, Chilean footballer
- October 30 – Marios Pashialis, former international Cypriot footballer
- November 1 – Igor Cvitanović, Croatian footballer
- November 17 – Max Huiberts, Dutch footballer
- November 27 – Sebastian Synoradzki, Polish footballer and coach
- November 29
  - Mario Arteaga, Mexican footballer
  - Mark Pembridge, Welsh footballer
- December 5 – Francisco Veza, Spanish footballer
- December 11 – Chris Henderson, American soccer player

== Deaths ==
=== August ===
- August 12 - Arne Nyberg Swedish international footballer (born 1913)

=== September ===
- September 18 – Pedro Cea, Uruguayan striker, winner of the 1930 FIFA World Cup. (70)
