= 1996–97 Atletico Celaya season =

Atletico Celaya
1996–97 season
- Chairman: Enrique Fernandez
- Manager: José Guadalupe Díaz until 29 September 1996; Kiril Dojcinovski until 31 December 1996; Eduardo Solari until 16 March 1997; Enrique Díaz until 24 March 1997; Jaime Cuesta
- Stadium: Miguel Aleman
- Invierno: 16th
- Verano: 17th
- Copa México: Group stage
- Copa Pachuca: Runners-up
- Top goalscorer: League: Míchel (9 goals); All: Míchel (9 goals)
- Biggest win: Celaya 3–0 CD Guadalajara (19 October 1996)
- Biggest defeat: Atlante 6–0 Celaya (19 November 1996)
Home colours	Away colours
- All statistics correct as of 30 January 2019.

The 1996–97 Atletico Celaya season was the 2nd season since the team's last promotion to Primera División. Celaya competed in Primera División and Copa México

== Summary ==
During summer the club clinched the arrival of former Spain international Midfielder Míchel from Real Madrid and Defender Ivan Hurtado from Emelec. In January former Mexico international Forward Hugo Sanchez signed in from Dallas Burn after being released. Meanwhile, club star and starter Forward Emilio Butragueno was injured several weeks.

== Squad ==
Note: Flags indicate national team as defined under FIFA eligibility rules; some limited exceptions apply. Players may hold more than one non-FIFA nationality.

No.	Pos.	Nation	Player
1	GK	MEX	Adrián Chávez
2	DF	MEX	Armando Cabrera
3	DF	MEX	Jorge Joel Cruz (Captain)
4	DF	MEX	Carlos López
5	DF	MEX	Víctor Díaz Leal
7	FW	ESP	Emilio Butragueño
8	MF	ESP	Míchel
9	FW	MEX	Hugo Sánchez
9	FW	CHI	Richard Zambrano
11	MF	USA	Salvador Reyes
12	MF	MEX	Luis Fernando Soto
13	MF	MEX	Juvenal Patiño
14	DF	MEX	Guillermo Aranda
15	DF	MEX	Apolinar González
16	FW	MEX	Carlos Hernández

No.	Pos.	Nation	Player
17	DF	MEX	Héctor Medrano
18	FW	MEX	Hugo Santana
19	MF	MEX	Javier Cruz
20	FW	BRA	Adriano Fernandes
21	MF	MEX	Felipe Aguirre
22	MF	BRA	Júlio César Pinheiro
23	DF	ECU	Iván Hurtado
24	DF	MEX	Salvador Vaca
27	GK	MEX	Homero Pasallo
29	MF	MEX	José Franco
31	GK	MEX	Emmanuel González
36	DF	MEX	Sergio Prado
38	MF	MEX	Edgar González
25	FW	MEX	Arturo Rico

=== Transfers ===
In
Pos.	Name	from	Type
MF	Míchel	Real Madrid	
GK	Adrián Chávez	América	
DF	Carlos López	Guadalajara	
DF	Salvador Reyes	Guadalajara	
MF	Héctor Medrano	Toluca	
MF	Luis Fernando Soto	Cruz Azul	
FW	Hugo Santana	Atlante	
MF	Julio Cesar Pinheiro	Guarani	
FW	Adriano Fernandes	Guarani	

Out
Pos.	Name	To	Type
MF	Tiba	Atlante	
GK	Hugo Pineda	America	
MF	Salvador Mercado	Guadalajara	
MF	Sergio Bueno	Puebla FC	
MF	Israel Castillo	Puebla FC	
FW	Amarildo Soares	UAG	
MF	Alfonso Malibran	UAG	

==== Winter ====
In
Pos.	Name	from	Type
FW	Hugo Sanchez	Dallas Burn	
MF	Salvador Vaca		

Out
Pos.	Name	To	Type
FW	Richard Zambrano	Colo-Colo	

== Competitions ==
=== Invierno 1996 ===
==== League table ====
Pos	Team	Pld	W	D	L	GF	GA	GD	Pts	Qualification or relegation
14	UAG	17	5	3	9	20	30	−10	18	
15	América	17	4	5	8	24	27	−3	17	
16	Celaya	17	5	2	10	19	33	−14	17	
17	Pachuca	17	3	6	8	25	36	−11	15	Team is last in Relegation table
18	Morelia	17	3	3	11	20	31	−11	12	

Source: Liga MX
Rules for classification: 1) Points; 2) Goal difference; 3) Number of goals scored; 4) Head-to-head results between tied teams; 5) Number of goals scored away; 6) Highest relegation coefficient; 7) Fair Play points

==== Matches ====
10 August 1996 1	Atlético Celaya	0–0	Monterrey	Celaya
20:15 DST				Stadium: Miguel Aleman

17 August 1996 2	Veracruz	1–1	Atlético Celaya	Veracruz
16:00 DST	Fascioli 29'		35' (pen.) Zambrano	Stadium: Luis Pirata Fuente

25 August 1996 3	Atlético Celaya	v	Necaxa	Celaya
20:15 DST				Stadium: Miguel Aleman
Note: postponed

31 August 1996 4	Atlas	2–1	Atlético Celaya	Guadalajara
20:45 DST	Avilán 7'; Rodolfo García 8'		63' (pen.) Zambrano	Stadium: Jalisco

8 September 1996 5	Atlético Celaya	0–1	Toluca	Celaya
20:15 DST			11' (pen.) Bernal	Stadium: Miguel Aleman

10 September 1996 3	Atlético Celaya	1–2	Necaxa	Celaya
20:15 DST	Michel 89'		6' (pen.) García Aspe; 68' José E. García	Stadium: Miguel Aleman

16 September 1996 6	Toros Neza	1–2	Atlético Celaya	Neza
16:00 DST	Mohamed 31'		11', 18' Michel	Stadium: Neza 86

21 September 1996 7	Atlético Celaya	0–1	UNAM	Celaya
18:00 DST			68' Domizzi	Stadium: Miguel Aleman

28 September 1996 8	Leon	4–1	Atlético Celaya	Leon
20:45 DST	Tita 24', 63' (pen.); Torres 73', 82'		52' (pen.) Michel	Stadium: Nou Camp

5 October 1996 9	Atlético Celaya	-	America	Celaya
20:15 DST				Stadium: Miguel Aleman
Note: postponed

13 October 1996 10	Morelia	1–2	Atlético Celaya	Morelia
12:00 DST	Andrés Garza 34'		14' Michel; 65' Zambrano	Stadium: Morelos

19 October 1996 11	Atlético Celaya	3–0	Guadalajara	Celaya
DST	Michel 17' (pen.); Carlos Hernández 59', 73'			Stadium: Miguel Aleman

23 October 1996 9	Atlético Celaya	0–2	America	Celaya
DST			Blanco 22'; Biyik 83'	Stadium: Miguel Aleman

26 October 1996 12	Cruz Azul	2–3	Atlético Celaya	Benito Juarez
CT	Palencia 30'; Zamora 57'		21' Carlos Hernández; 34', 52' Carlos López	Stadium: Azul

2 November 1996 13	Atlético Celaya	0–1	Puebla	Celaya
CT			70' Muñoz	Stadium: Miguel Aleman

8 November 1996 14	UAG	5–2	Atlético Celaya	Zapopan
CT	Embé 11', 25'; Juan Parra 25', 58'; López 71'		20' Carlos Hernández; 83' Reyes	Stadium: 3 de Marzo

14 November 1996 15	Atlético Celaya	3–2	Pachuca	Celaya
CT	Soto 49'; Juvenal Patiño 75'; Zambrano 78'		41' Medford; 43' Lorenzo Sáez	Stadium: Miguel Aleman

18 November 1996 16	Atlante	6–0	Atlético Celaya	Coyoacan
20:45 CT	Mario Jáuregui 10'; Tiba 42'; Hernández 44'; Carvajal 50'; Zague 66', 84'			Stadium: Azteca

23 November 1996 17	Atlético Celaya	0–2	Santos Laguna	Celaya
17:00 CT			64' Christian Montesinos; 74' Muñoz	Stadium: Miguel Aleman

=== Copa Pachuca ===
Source: RSSSF

Semi-finals
3 January – Estadio Hidalgo
Atlético Hidalgo	2 (4)
Atlético Celaya	2 (5)
3 January – Estadio Hidalgo
Pachuca	0
América	3

Final
5 January – Estadio Hidalgo
América	3
Atlético Celaya	1
Third place
5 January – Estadio Hidalgo
Pachuca	4
Atlético Hidalgo	0

=== Verano 1997 ===
==== League table ====
Pos	Team	Pld	W	D	L	GF	GA	GD	Pts	Qualification or relegation
14	Monterrey	17	5	3	9	25	38	−13	18	
15	Pachuca	17	5	2	10	24	32	−8	17	Team is last in Relegation table
16	Atlas	17	4	4	9	23	36	−13	16	
17	Celaya	17	2	6	9	20	28	−8	12	
18	Veracruz	17	2	4	11	17	31	−14	10	

Source: Liga MX
Rules for classification: 1) Points; 2) Goal difference; 3) Number of goals scored; 4) Head-to-head results between tied teams; 5) Number of goals scored away; 6) Highest relegation coefficient; 7) Fair Play points

==== Matches ====
11 January 1997 1	Monterrey	1–0	Atlético Celaya	Monterrey
CST	Arellano 10'			Stadium: Tecnologico

18 January 1997 2	Atlético Celaya	1–1	Veracruz	Celaya
CST	David Hernández 59' (o.g.)		24' René Iván Valenciano	Stadium: Miguel Aleman

25 January 1997 3	Necaxa	2–1	Atlético Celaya	Coyoacan
CST	Sergio Vázquez 17'; García Aspe 83'		65' (pen.) Michel	Stadium: Azteca

1 February 1997 4	Atlético Celaya	3–0	Atlas	Celaya
CST	Juvenal Patiño 31'; Pinheiro 36'; Sánchez 44'			Stadium: Miguel Aleman

8 February 1997 5	Toluca	2–0	Atlético Celaya	Toluca
CST	Alfaro 47'; Lillingston 73'			Stadium: La Bombonera

15 February 1997 6	Atlético Celaya	2–2	Toros Neza	Celaya
CST	Pinheiro 18', 49'		22' Saavedra; 71' Lussenhoff	Stadium: Miguel Aleman

23 February 1997 7	UNAM	4–3	Atlético Celaya	Coyoacan
CST	Domizzi 7', 51' (pen.), 58'; Olalde 84'		44' (pen.) Michel; 81' Santana; 89' Soto	Stadium: Olimpico

1 March 1997 8	Atlético Celaya	0–0	Leon	Celaya
CST				Stadium: Miguel Aleman

10 March 1997 9	America	4–0	Atlético Celaya	Coyoacan
CST	Terrazas 24'; Milojevic 61'; Blanco 77', 82'			Stadium: Azteca

15 March 1997 10	Atlético Celaya	0–1	Morelia	Celaya
CST			78' Claudinho	Stadium: Miguel Aleman

23 March 1997 11	Guadalajara	3–2	Atlético Celaya	Guadalajara
CST	Gabriel García 34'; Sánchez 77'; Nápoles 87'		6' Sergio Prado; 64' Adriano Fernández	Stadium: Jalisco

29 March 1997 12	Atlético Celaya	-	Cruz Azul	Celaya
CST				Stadium: Miguel Aleman
Note: postponed

5 April 1997 13	Puebla	2–1	Atlético Celaya	Puebla
CST	Muñoz 9'; Jiménez 31'		13' Michel	Stadium: Cuauhtemoc

9 April 1997 14	Atlético Celaya	1–1	UAG	Celaya
CST	Adriano Fernández 80'		1' Embé	Stadium: Miguel Aleman

12 April 1997 12	Atlético Celaya	1–1	Cruz Azul	Celaya
CST	Butragueño 12'		9' Rodríguez	Stadium: Miguel Aleman

20 April 1997 15	Pachuca	1–3	Atlético Celaya	Pachuca
CST	Myers 41'		19' Adriano Fernández; 50' Sánchez; 88' Butragueño	Stadium: Hidalgo

26 Apr 1997 16	Atlético Celaya	0–0	Atlante	Celaya
CST				Stadium: Miguel Aleman

4 May 1997 17	Santos Laguna	3–2	Atlético Celaya	Torreon
CST	Borgetti 14' 64'; Caballero 26' (pen.)		80' Santana; 88' (pen.) Reyes	Stadium: Corona

== Statistics ==
=== Goalscorers ===
9 goals

- (Spain) Michel

4 goals

- (Chile) Richard Zambrano
- (Mexico) Carlos Hernandez

3 goals

- (Brazil) Julio Cesar Pinheiro
- (Brazil) Adriano Fernandes

2 goals

- (Mexico) Hugo Sanchez
- (Spain) Emilio Butragueño
- (Mexico) Carlos Lopez
- (United States) Salvador Reyes
- (Mexico) Luis Fernando Soto
- (Mexico) Juvenal Patiño
- (Mexico) Hugo Santana

1 goal

- (Mexico) Sergio Prado
