= 1996–97 C.D. Guadalajara season =

Guadalajara
1996–97 season
- Manager: Ricardo Ferretti
- Stadium: Estadio Jalisco
- Invierno: 3rd Playoffs: Quarterfinals
- Verano: 2nd Playoffs: Winners
- Copa México: Semifinals
- Top goalscorer: League: Gustavo Nápoles (17 goals); All: Gustavo Nápoles (18 goals)
- Biggest win: Hermosillo 1–7 Guadalajara (20 July 1996)
- Biggest defeat: Celaya 3–0 Guadalajara (19 October 1996)
| Home colours | Away colours |
- All statistics correct as of 30 January 2019.

The 1996–97 C.D. Guadalajara season was the 90th season in the football club's history. Guadalajara competed in Primera División and Copa México, winning the Verano 1997 tournament.

== Coaching staff ==
| Position | Name |
|---|---|
| Head coach | (Brazil) (Mexico) Ricardo Ferretti |
| Assistant coaches | (Mexico) Hugo Hernández |
| Assistant coaches | (Mexico) Jaime Castillo |
| Fitness coach | (Mexico) Guillermo Orta |
| Doctor | (Mexico) Pablo Sandoval |

== Players ==
=== Squad information ===
| No. | Pos. | Nat. | Name | Date of birth (age) | Signed in | Previous club |
Goalkeepers
| 1 | GK | (Mexico) | Eduardo Fernández | 30 July 1962 (aged 34) | 1993 | (Mexico) Morelia |
| 23 | GK | (Mexico) | Martín Zúñiga | 6 August 1970 (aged 26) | 1995 | (Mexico) UANL |
Defenders
| 2 | DF | (Mexico) | Noé Zárate | 11 May 1973 (aged 23) | 1996 | |
| 4 | DF | (Mexico) | Claudio Suárez | 17 December 1968 (aged 27) | 1996 | (Mexico) UNAM |
| 5 | DF | (Mexico) | Camilo Romero | 30 March 1970 (aged 26) | 1994 | (Mexico) Morelia |
| 8 | DF | (Mexico) | Joel Sánchez | 17 August 1974 (aged 21) | 1991 | |
| 13 | DF | (Mexico) | Nicolás Morales | 5 May 1966 (aged 30) | 1996 | (Mexico) Necaxa |
| 21 | DF | (Mexico) | Héctor Castro | 10 February 1976 (aged 20) | 1996 | (Mexico) Youth system |
| 58 | DF | (Mexico) | Guillermo Hernández | 18 February 1971 (aged 25) | 1990 | |
Midfielders
| 6 | MF | (Mexico) | Alberto Coyote (Captain) | 26 March 1967 (aged 29) | 1993 | (Mexico) León |
| 7 | MF | (Mexico) | Ramón Ramírez | 5 December 1969 (aged 26) | 1994 | (Mexico) Santos Laguna |
| 11 | MF | (Mexico) | Manuel Martínez | 3 January 1972 (aged 24) | 1991 | |
| 14 | MF | (Mexico) | Felipe Robles | 26 March 1969 (aged 27) | 1993 | |
| 15 | MF | (Mexico) | Paulo César Chávez | 7 January 1976 (aged 20) | 1993 | |
| 17 | MF | (Mexico) | Salvador Mercado | 25 March 1969 (aged 27) | 1996 | (United States) El Paso Patriots |
| 19 | MF | (Mexico) | Mariano Varela | 14 April 1972 (aged 24) | 1995 | (Mexico) UANL |
| 25 | MF | (Mexico) | Luis Gueta | 20 July 1976 (aged 20) | 1996 | (Mexico) Youth system |
| 30 | MF | (Mexico) | Missael Espinoza | 12 April 1965 (aged 31) | 1993 | (Mexico) Monterrey |
Forwards
| 9 | FW | (Mexico) | Ignacio Vázquez | 31 July 1971 (aged 25) | 1991 | |
| 10 | FW | (Mexico) | Gustavo Nápoles | 11 May 1973 (aged 23) | 1995 | (Mexico) UANL |
| 16 | FW | (Mexico) | Gabriel García | 16 February 1974 (aged 22) | 1992 | |
| 18 | FW | (Mexico) | Jorge Arreola | 17 October 1972 (aged 23) | 1992 | |
| 27 | FW | (Mexico) | Sergio Pacheco | 25 October 1965 (aged 30) | 1996 | (Mexico) Veracruz |

Players and squad numbers last updated on 30 January 2019.
Note: Flags indicate national team as has been defined under FIFA eligibility rules. Players may hold more than one non-FIFA nationality.

== Competitions ==
=== Overview ===
| Competition | First match | Last match | Starting round | Final position | Record | | | | | | | |
| Competition | First match | Last match | Starting round | Final position | Pld | W | D | L | GF | GA | GD | Win % |
|---|---|---|---|---|---|---|---|---|---|---|---|---|
| Torneo Invierno | 11 August 1996 | 8 December 1996 | Matchday 1 | 3rd | 19 | 10 | 4 | 5 | 35 | 22 | +13 | 52.63 |
| Torneo Verano | 12 January 1997 | 1 June 1997 | Matchday 1 | Winners | 23 | 12 | 9 | 2 | 41 | 20 | +21 | 52.17 |
| Copa México | 7 July 1996 | 31 July 1996 | Group stage | Semifinals | 8 | 6 | 0 | 2 | 25 | 8 | +17 | 75.00 |
| Total | | | | | 50 | 28 | 13 | 9 | 101 | 50 | +51 | 56.00 |

Source: RSSSF.com

=== Torneo Invierno ===
==== League table ====
| Pos | Team | Pld | W | D | L | GF | GA | GD | Pts | Qualification or relegation |
|---|---|---|---|---|---|---|---|---|---|---|
| 1 | Atlante | 17 | 12 | 2 | 3 | 30 | 11 | +19 | 38 | Advance to Liguilla (Playoffs) |
| 2 | Santos Laguna (C) | 17 | 10 | 4 | 3 | 21 | 15 | +6 | 34 | Advance to Liguilla (Playoffs) |
| 3 | Guadalajara | 17 | 9 | 4 | 4 | 33 | 19 | +14 | 31 | Advance to Liguilla (Playoffs) |
| 4 | Puebla | 17 | 9 | 4 | 4 | 32 | 22 | +10 | 31 | Advance to Liguilla (Playoffs) |
| 5 | Toluca | 17 | 9 | 3 | 5 | 26 | 15 | +11 | 30 | Advance to Liguilla (Playoffs) |

Source: Liga MX
Rules for classification: 1) Points; 2) Goal difference; 3) Number of goals scored; 4) Head-to-head results between tied teams; 5) Number of goals scored away; 6) Highest relegation coefficient; 7) Fair Play points
(C) Champions

==== Results summary ====
| Overall | | | | | | | | Home | | | | | | Away | | | | | |
| Pld | W | D | L | GF | GA | GD | Pts | W | D | L | GF | GA | GD | W | D | L | GF | GA | GD |
|---|---|---|---|---|---|---|---|---|---|---|---|---|---|---|---|---|---|---|---|
| 17 | 9 | 4 | 4 | 33 | 19 | +14 | 31 | 7 | 0 | 1 | 20 | 6 | +14 | 2 | 4 | 3 | 13 | 13 | 0 |

Source: Liga MX

==== Matches ====
| 11 August 1996 1 | Guadalajara | 2–0 | UNAM | Guadalajara |
| 12:00 | Suárez 41'; García 49' | Report | | Stadium: Estadio Jalisco |

| 17 August 1996 2 | León | 0–0 | Guadalajara | León |
| 20:45 | | Report | | Stadium: Estadio León |

| 25 August 1996 3 | Guadalajara | 5–0 | América | Guadalajara |
| 12:00 | Ramírez 4'; Pacheco 23'; Chávez 65'; García 71', 74' | Report | | Stadium: Estadio Jalisco |

| 1 September 1996 4 | Morelia | 1–4 | Guadalajara | Morelia |
| 12:00 | Soto 87' | Report | García 58', 90'; Nápoles 84'; Coyote 89' | Stadium: Estadio Morelos |

| 8 September 1996 5 | Santos Laguna | 1–1 | Guadalajara | Zacatecas City |
| 15:00 | Borgetti 18' | Report | Nápoles 86' | Stadium: Estadio Francisco Villa |

| 2 October 1996 6 | Guadalajara | 1–0 | Cruz Azul | Guadalajara |
| 20:45 | García 69' | Report | | Stadium: Estadio Jalisco |

| 24 September 1996 7 | Puebla | 1–1 | Guadalajara | Puebla |
| 20:00 | Muñoz 9' | Report | García 80' | Stadium: Estadio Cuahtémoc |

| 29 September 1996 8 | Guadalajara | 4–1 | UAG | Guadalajara |
| 12:00 | Coyote 11'; Nápoles 15'; García 42'; Robles 88' | Report | Davino 17' | Stadium: Estadio Jalisco |

| 6 October 1996 9 | Pachuca | 0–2 | Guadalajara | Pachuca |
| 12:00 | | Report | Suárez 18'; García 65' | Stadium: Estadio Hidalgo |

| 13 October 1996 10 | Guadalajara | 1–0 | Atlante | Guadalajara |
| 12:00 | Martínez 46' | Report | | Stadium: Estadio Jalisco |

| 19 October 1996 11 | Celaya | 3–0 | Guadalajara | Celaya |
| 20:15 | Míchel 16'; Hernández 60', 74' | Report | | Stadium: Estadio Miguel Alemán Valdés |

| 27 October 1996 12 | Guadalajara | 2–1 | Monterrey | Guadalajara |
| 12:00 | García 11', 25'; Nápoles 29' | Report | Castillo 85' | Stadium: Estadio Jalisco |

| 2 November 1996 13 | Veracruz | 3–2 | Guadalajara | Veracruz |
| 16:00 | Fascioli 15'; de Brito 66'; González China 75' | Report | Romero 25'; Vázquez 55' | Stadium: Estadio Luis "Pirata" Fuente |

| 10 November 1996 14 | Guadalajara | 2–3 | Necaxa | Guadalajara |
| 12:00 | Vázquez 34'; García 77' | Report | Zárate 16'; Córdova 26'; Peláez 84' | Stadium: Estadio Jalisco |

| 13 November 1996 15 | Atlas | 2–2 | Guadalajara | Guadalajara |
| 20:45 | Mascareño 11'; Torres 20' | Report | García 21'; Nápoles 43' | Stadium: Estadio Jalisco |

| 17 November 1996 16 | Guadalajara | 2–1 | Toluca | Guadalajara |
| 12:00 | Suárez 50', 64' (pen.) | Report | Abundis 10' | Stadium: Estadio Jalisco; Referee: Armando Archundia |

| 24 November 1996 17 | Toros Neza | 2–1 | Guadalajara | Ciudad Nezahualcóyotl |
| 12:00 | Ruiz 59'; Nildeson 61' | Report | Vázquez 27' | Stadium: Estadio Neza 86 |

===== Liguilla =====
====== Quarter-finals ======
| 4 December 1996 First leg | Necaxa | 2–0 | Guadalajara | Mexico City |
| 20:30 | García Aspe 16'; Hernández 25' | Report | | Stadium: Estadio Azteca |

| 8 December 1996 Second leg | Guadalajara | 2–1 (2–3 agg.) | Necaxa | Guadalajara |
| 12:00 | Sánchez 21'; Suárez 59' | Report | Aguinaga 7' | Stadium: Estadio Jalisco |

=== Torneo Verano ===
==== League table ====
| Pos | Team | Pld | W | D | L | GF | GA | GD | Pts | Qualification or relegation |
|---|---|---|---|---|---|---|---|---|---|---|
| 1 | América | 17 | 11 | 4 | 2 | 27 | 12 | +15 | 37 | Advance to Liguilla (Playoffs) |
| 2 | Guadalajara (C) | 17 | 9 | 7 | 1 | 27 | 16 | +11 | 34 | Advance to Liguilla (Playoffs) |
| 3 | Toros Neza | 17 | 9 | 3 | 5 | 40 | 32 | +8 | 30 | Advance to Liguilla (Playoffs) |
| 4 | Necaxa | 17 | 8 | 4 | 5 | 33 | 20 | +13 | 28 | Advance to Liguilla (Playoffs) |
| 5 | Atlante | 17 | 8 | 4 | 5 | 23 | 19 | +4 | 28 | Advance to Liguilla (Playoffs) |

Source: Liga MX
Rules for classification: 1) Points; 2) Goal difference; 3) Number of goals scored; 4) Head-to-head results between tied teams; 5) Number of goals scored away; 6) Highest relegation coefficient; 7) Fair Play points
(C) Champions

== Statistics ==
=== Goals ===
| Rank | Player | Position | Invierno | Verano | Copa México | Total |
|---|---|---|---|---|---|---|
| 1 | (Mexico) Gustavo Nápoles | FW | 5 | 12 | 1 | 18 |
| 2 | (Mexico) Gabriel García | FW | 13 | 3 | 1 | 17 |
| 3 | (Mexico) Ignacio Vázquez | FW | 3 | 3 | 5 | 11 |
| 4 | (Mexico) Sergio Pacheco | FW | 1 | 1 | 8 | 10 |
| 5 | (Mexico) Joel Sánchez | DF | 1 | 3 | 3 | 7 |
| 5 | (Mexico) Claudio Suárez | DF | 5 | 2 | 0 | 7 |
| 7 | (Mexico) Paulo César Chávez | MF | 1 | 5 | 0 | 6 |
| 7 | (Mexico) Manuel Martínez | MF | 1 | 4 | 1 | 6 |
| 9 | (Mexico) Jorge Arreola | FW | 0 | 2 | 1 | 3 |
| 9 | (Mexico) Alberto Coyote | MF | 2 | 0 | 1 | 3 |
| 9 | (Mexico) Ramón Ramírez | MF | 1 | 1 | 1 | 3 |
| 9 | (Mexico) Noé Zárate | DF | 0 | 2 | 1 | 3 |
| 13 | (Mexico) Missael Espinoza | MF | 0 | 2 | 0 | 2 |
| 13 | (Mexico) Salvador Mercado | MF | 0 | 0 | 2 | 2 |
| 15 | (Mexico) Juan Colorado | MF | 0 | 0 | 1 | 1 |
| 15 | (Mexico) Guillermo Hernández | DF | 0 | 1 | 0 | 1 |
| 15 | (Mexico) Felipe Robles | MF | 1 | 0 | 0 | 1 |
| 15 | (Mexico) Camilo Romero | DF | 1 | 0 | 0 | 11 |
| Total | | | 35 | 41 | 26 | 102 |

=== Hat-tricks ===
| Player | Against | Result | Date | Competition |
|---|---|---|---|---|
| (Mexico) Ignacio Vázquez | UAG | 5–1 (H) | 11 July 1996 | Copa México |
| (Mexico) Sergio Pacheco | La Piedad | 4–0 (A) | 17 July 1996 | Copa México |
| (Mexico) Gustavo Nápoles | Toros Neza | 6–1 (H) | 1 June 1997 | Primera División |

=== Clean sheets ===
| Rank | Name | Invierno | Verano | Total |
|---|---|---|---|---|
| 1 | (Mexico) Martín Zúñiga | 6 | 6 | 12 |
| Total | | 6 | 6 | 12 |
