= 1994–95 Club Universidad Nacional season =

Club Universidad Nacional
1994-95 season
- Owner: Federal Government of Mexico
- President: Guillermo Aguilar Alvarez
- Manager: Ricardo Ferretti
- Stadium: Olimpico Universitario
- Primera Division: 6th Quarterfinals
- Copa Mexico: Group stage
- Top goalscorer: Rafael Garcia (8 goals)
Home colours	Away colours
- All statistics correct as of 27 January 2019.

The 1994–95 Club Universidad Nacional season is the 40th season in the football club's history and the 32nd consecutive season in the top flight division of Mexican football.

== Summary ==
In summertime President Guillermo Aguilar Alvarez sold midfielder Miguel España to Tigres UANL and centre back defender Juan de Dios Ramirez Perales to CF Monterrey reinforcing the squad with the transfers in of Mike Sorber loaned from Major League Soccer which inaugural season was delayed until 1996, midfielder Pedro Massacessi another loan from Atlante FC and Chilean Forward Juan Carreño. The average age of the players was the lowest of the entire league Division in a sign of austerity for upcoming years due to the Mexican peso crisis which hit the Federal Government Budget included state universities around the country such as: Tigres UANL, Correcaminos UAT, Leones Negros UdeG and, of course, even Pumas UNAM.

However, the young Pumas delivered a decent season despite the low level of its offensive line but a talented midfield with good performances by Braulio Luna, Antonio Sancho, Rafael "Chiquis" Garcia (club topscorer) and playmaker Tiba getting a good streak without a lost match during almost the whole second half of the season. Although, the defensive line had a poor start after a massive 2-6 defeat at Estadio Morelos then goalkeeper Jorge Campos, Oteo, Suarez and newly arrived left back Miguel A. Carreon improved their campaign helping to finish in a 6th spot in league and reached the quarterfinals against Cruz Azul being eliminated after two exciting matches with a last minute goal scored by right back defender Guadalupe Castañeda.

== Squad ==
Note: Flags indicate national team as defined under FIFA eligibility rules; some limited exceptions apply. Players may hold more than one non-FIFA nationality.

No.	Pos.	Nation	Player
1	GK	MEX	Sergio Bernal
2	DF	MEX	Claudio Suarez
3	DF	MEX	David Oteo
4	MF	USA	Mike Sorber
5	DF	MEX	Miguel Angel Carreon
6	MF	MEX	Rafael Garcia
7	DF	MEX	Braulio Luna
8	MF	MEX	Antonio Sancho
9	GK	MEX	Jorge Campos
10	FW	BRA	Tiba

No.	Pos.	Nation	Player
11	FW	MEX	Jorge Santillana
12	MF	ARG	Pedro Massacessi
13	FW	MEX	Eduardo Medina
14	DF	MEX	Israel López
15	MF	USA	Felipe Rodriguez
16	DF	MEX	Arturo Ortega
17	FW	MEX	Jesús Olalde
18	FW	CHI	Juan Carreño
19	MF	MEX	Vicente Nieto
23	MF	MEX	Jorge Collazo

=== Transfers ===
In
Pos.	Name	from	Type
DF	Mike Sorber		loan
MF	Pedro Massacessi	Atlante FC	loan
FW	Juan Carreño	Unión Española	

Out
Pos.	Name	To	Type
MF	Miguel España	Tigres UANL	
DF	Juan de Dios Ramirez Perales	CF Monterrey	
MF	Manuel Sol	Necaxa	

==== Winter ====
In
Pos.	Name	from	Type
MF	Felipe Rodriguez	Queretaro FC	

Out
Pos.	Name	To	Type
FW	Juan Carreño	Cobreloa	

== Competitions ==
=== La Liga ===
==== League table ====
===== Group 1 =====
Pos	Team	Pld	W	D	L	GF	GA	GD	Pts	Qualification or relegation
1	Guadalajara	36	22	8	6	70	35	+35	52	Playoff
2	UNAM	36	15	11	10	49	36	+13	41	Playoff
3	Puebla	36	12	16	8	45	41	+4	40	Playoff
4	Toluca	36	10	8	18	44	57	−13	28	
5	Tampico Madero-TM Gallos	36	8	7	21	41	74	−33	23	Relegated

===== General table =====
Pos	Team	Pld	W	D	L	GF	GA	GD	Pts	Qualification
4	Necaxa	36	16	14	6	69	38	+31	46	Qualification for the quarter-finals (Note: The first four places in the table and teams ranked 6th and 8th qualified for the Liguilla quarter-finals.)
5	UAG (C)	36	14	14	8	50	47	+3	42	Qualification for the Repechaje (Note: Teams ranked 5th, 7th, 9th and 11th in the table qualified for Repechaje)
6	UNAM	36	15	11	10	49	36	+13	41	Qualification for the quarter-finals
7	Puebla	36	12	16	8	45	41	+4	40	Qualification for the Repechaje
8	Santos Laguna	36	13	9	14	61	62	−1	35	Qualification for the quarter-finals

Source: Liga MX
Rules for classification: 1) Points; 2) Goal difference; 3) Number of goals scored; 4) Head-to-head results between tied teams; 5) Number of goals scored away; 6) Highest relegation coefficient; 7) Fair Play points
(C) Champions

===== Results by round =====
Round	1	2	3	4	5	6	7	8	9	10	11	12	13	14	15	16	17	18	19	20	21	22	23	24	25	26	27	28	29	30	31	32	33	34	35	36	37	38
Ground	A	H	A	H	A	H	A	H	A	H	A	H	H	A	H	A	H	A	H	H	A	H	A	H	A	H	A	H	A	H	A	A	H	A	H	A	H	A
Result	W	W	L	L	D	W	L	W	W	L	-	D	D	W	D	L	W	D	W	D	L	D	L	D	W	L	W	L	L	-	L	D	D	D	W	W	L	L
Position	13	15	18	11	7	4	8	6	6	3	5	8	10	12	12	10	10	8	10	8	10	9	8	8	6	5	5	5	4	4	4	5	5	5	6	5	5	6

Source: Competitive matches
A = Away; H = Home; W = Win; D = Draw; L = Loss; P = Postponed; = Leader, Qualification for the quarter-finals; C = Qualification for the quarter-finals as group leader.; E = Qualification for the quarter-finals as group runner-up.; R = Qualification for the Repechaje.

==== Matches ====
3 September 1994 1	CF Monterrey	1-0	UNAM	Monterrey
	Verdirame 6'			Stadium: Tecnológico

10 September 1994 2	UNAM	3-3	León	Tlalpan
	Sancho 4'; Medina 55'; García 75'		31' Reinoso; 47' Gustavo Dezotti; 81' Luis Salazar	Stadium: Olimpico Universitario

17 September 1994 3	Atlas FC	1-0	UNAM	Guadalajara
	Berizzo 18' (pen.)			Stadium: Jalisco

25 September 1994 4	UNAM	3-0	Tecos UAG	Tlalpan
	Campos 8'; Rafael García 76'; Israel Lopez 78'			Stadium: Olimpico Universitario

2 October 1994 5	Santos Laguna	1-3	UNAM	Torreon
	Benjamín Galindo 45' (pen.)		20', 38' (pen.) Campos; 80' Santillana	Stadium: Corona

9 October 1994 6	UNAM	2-1	Cruz Azul	Tlalpan
	García 10'; Campos 79' (pen.)		45' Mora	Stadium: Olimpico Universitario

16 October 1994 7	Atlético Morelia	6-2	UNAM	Morelia
	Juan Morales 3'; Marco Antonio Figueroa 18', 39', 77'; Hugo Santana 67'; Luis Hernán Pérez 73'		31' Lopez; 54' (pen.) Campos	Stadium: Morelos

22 October 1994 8	UNAM	2-1	Atlante FC	Tlalpan
	Rafael García 15'; Santillana 29'		34' Sanchez	Stadium: Olimpico Universitario

30 October 1994 9	Correcaminos UAT	0-0	UNAM	Ciudad Victoria
				Stadium: Marte R.Gomez

7 November 1994 10	UNAM	2-1	Tigres UANL	Tlalpan
	Santillana 25', 27'		66' Napoles	Stadium: Olimpico Universitario

13 November 1994 11	Toros Neza	2-1	UNAM	Ciudad Nezahualcoyotl
	Farfan 2'; Vazquez 12'		73' Massacessi	Stadium: Neza 86

19 November 1994 12	UNAM	0-2	CD Guadalajara	Tlalpan
			13'Turrubiates; 43' Espinoza	Stadium: Olimpico Universitario

29 November 1994 13	UNAM	1-2	Veracruz	Tlalpan
	Massacessi 17'		41' Enrique Figueroa; 57' Poblete	Stadium: Olimpico Universitario

4 December 1994 15	América	3-1	UNAM	Tlalpan
	Zague 30'; Francois-Omam Biyik 62'; Kalusha 70'		11' Massacessi	Stadium: Azteca

9 December 1994 16	UNAM	1-0	Puebla FC	Tlalpan
	Suarez 16'			Stadium: Olimpico Universitario

16 December 1994 17	UNAM	3-0	TM Gallos Blancos	Tlalpan
	Olalde 41', 65'; Arturo Ortega 85'			Stadium: Olimpico Universitario

22 December 1994 18	Necaxa	2-1	UNAM	Tlalpan
	Luis Hernández 57'; Aspe 67' (pen.)		59' Carreño	Stadium: Azteca

29 December 1994 19	UNAM	0-0	CD Toluca	Tlalpan
				Stadium: Olimpico Universitario

7 January 1995 20	UNAM	3-0	CF Monterrey	Tlalpan
	Oteo 35'; Lopez 77'; García 89'			Stadium: Olimpico Universitario

18 January 1995 21	Leon	2-0	UNAM	Leon de los Aldama
	Ayipei 25', 84'			Stadium: Nou Camp

21 January 1995 22	U.N.A.M.	1-0	Atlas FC	Tlalpan
	Suarez 75'			Stadium: Olimpico Universitario

27 January 1995 23	Tecos UAG	1-1	UNAM	Zapopan
	Donizete 43'		17' Tiba	Stadium: 3 de Marzo

3 February 1995 24	UNAM	1-1	Santos Laguna	Tlalpan
	Sancho 35'		50' (o.g.) Sancho	Stadium: Olimpico Universitario

11 February 1995 25	Cruz Azul	0-1	UNAM	Tlalpan
			49'García	Stadium: Azteca

17 February 1995 26	Pumas UNAM	5-0	Atlético Morelia	Tlalpan
	Santillana 30', 65'; Luna 36'; García 46'; Carreon 71'			Stadium: Olimpico Universitario

24 February 1995 27	Atlante FC	0-2	UNAM	Benito Juarez
			58' Massacessi; 64' García	Stadium: Azulgrana

3 March 1995 28	UNAM	2-1	Correcaminos UAT	Tlalpan
	Santillana 7'; Sancho 48'		53' Almaguer	Stadium: Olimpico Universitario

11 March 1995 29	Tigres UANL	0-1	UNAM	San Nicolas de los Garza
			23' Sancho	Stadium: Universitario

17 March 1995 30	UNAM	1-1	Toros Neza	Tlalpan
	Suarez 70'		34' Perea	Stadium: Olimpico Universitario

26 March 1995 31	CD Guadalajara	1-1	UNAM	Guadalajara
	Ignacio Vázquez 1'		67' Carreño	Stadium: Jalisco

5 April 1995 33	Veracruz	0-0	UNAM	Veracruz
				Stadium: Pirata Fuente

9 April 1995 34	Pumas UNAM	0-0	América	Coyoacan
				Stadium: Olimpico Universitario

15 April 1995 35	Puebla FC	0-0	Pumas UNAM	Puebla de los Angeles
				Stadium: Cuauhtemoc

23 April 1995 36	TM Gallos Blancos	0-3	Pumas UNAM	Queretaro
			67', 81' Olalde; 85' (pen.) Campos	Stadium: Corregidora

30 April 1995 37	Pumas UNAM	1-1	Necaxa	Tlalpan
	Suarez 24'		53' Pelaez	Stadium: Olimpico Universitario

7 May 1995 38	CD Toluca	2-1	Pumas UNAM	Toluca
	Abundis 2'; Mora 29'		89' Luna	Stadium: La Bombonera

==== Quarter-finals ====
17 May 1995	UNAM	1-0	Cruz Azul	Mexico City
20:30	García 53'			Stadium: Estadio Olímpico Universitario

20 May 1995	Cruz Azul	1-0	UNAM	Mexico City
17:00	Castañeda 90+2'			Stadium: Estadio Azteca

Aggregate tied 1-1. Cruz Azul advanced to semi-finals as best seeded team.
