= 1994–95 C.D. Guadalajara season =

CD Guadalajara
1994–95 season
- President: Salvador Martinez Garza
- Manager: Alberto Guerra
- Stadium: Jalisco
- Primera Division: 1st Semifinals
- Copa Mexico: Group stage
- Top goalscorer: Missael Espinosa (13 goals)
Home colours	Away colours
- All statistics correct as of 27 January 2019.

The 1994–95 CD Guadalajara season is the 88th season in the football club's history and the 51st consecutive season in the top flight division of Mexican football.

== Summary ==
In summertime Salvador Martinez Garza (a known oligarch of then-President Carlos Salinas de Gortari and Texaco distributor) in his 2nd campaign as Chairman reinforced the squad with left winger Ramon Ramirez, Forward Daniel Guzman and left-back defender Camilo Romero. In his second campaign as head coach Alberto Guerra after the collapse of "Super Chivas" the last season, improved the defensive line and aimed by superb features in midfield by Ramon Ramirez and Coyote plus the goals scored by Missael Espinosa and Guzman allowed the club to reach the 1st place in regular season the best campaign since the championship won in 1987. In league post-season, the team defeated Santos Laguna in quarterfinals reaching in fact the next phase for the first time since de 1990–91 Playoff.

However, the squad was eliminated in the semifinals by Necaxa despite being heavy-favourites to reach the final, prompting the end of Alberto Guerra's tenure as manager for the next season.

== Squad ==
Note: Flags indicate national team as defined under FIFA eligibility rules; some limited exceptions apply. Players may hold more than one non-FIFA nationality.

No.	Pos.	Nation	Player
1	GK	MEX	Eduardo Fernández
2	DF	MEX	Noé Zárate
3	DF	MEX	Manuel Vidrio
4	DF	MEX	Carlos Turrubiates
5	MF	MEX	Camilo Romero
6	MF	MEX	Alberto Coyote
7	MF	MEX	Ramón Ramírez
8	MF	MEX	José Manuel de la Torre
9	FW	MEX	Ignacio Vázquez
10	FW	MEX	Luis Flores
11	FW	MEX	Manuel Martínez

No.	Pos.	Nation	Player
13	DF	MEX	Guillermo Hernández
15	FW	MEX	Missael Espinoza
16	FW	MEX	Gabriel García
17	GK	MEX	Celestino Morales
18	DF	MEX	Jorge Arreola
23	MF	MEX	Alberto "Guamerú" García
25	DF	MEX	Felipe de J. Robles
27	MF	MEX	Omar Arellano
29	MF	MEX	Paulo César Chávez
58	FW	MEX	Daniel Guzman

=== Transfers ===
In
Pos.	Name	from	Type
MF	Ramón Ramírez	Santos Laguna	
FW	Daniel Guzman	Santos Laguna	
DF	Camilo Romero	Atlético Morelia	

Out
Pos.	Name	To	Type
MF	Benjamin Galindo	Santos Laguna	
FW	Juan Jose Balcazar	Santos Laguna	
FW	Everaldo Begines	Santos Laguna	
DF	José Luis Montes de Oca	Toros Neza	
MF	Paul Moreno	Puebla FC	
FW	Raul Paredes	La Piedad	
DF	Daniel Corral	Correcaminos UAT	
MF	Victor Santos	Leon	

==== Winter ====
In
Pos.	Name	from	Type

Out
Pos.	Name	To	Type

== Competitions ==
=== La Liga ===
==== League table ====
===== Group 1 =====
Pos	Team	Pld	W	D	L	GF	GA	GD	Pts	Qualification or relegation
1	Guadalajara	36	22	8	6	70	35	+35	52	Playoff
2	UNAM	36	15	11	10	49	36	+13	41	Playoff
3	Puebla	36	12	16	8	45	41	+4	40	Playoff
4	Toluca	36	10	8	18	44	57	−13	28	
5	Tampico Madero-TM Gallos	36	8	7	21	41	74	−33	23	Relegated

===== General table =====
Pos	Team	Pld	W	D	L	GF	GA	GD	Pts	Qualification
1	Guadalajara	36	22	8	6	70	35	+35	52	Qualification for the quarter-finals (Note: The first four places in the table and teams ranked 6th and 8th qualified for the Liguilla quarter-finals.)
2	America	36	19	13	4	88	46	+42	51	Qualification for the quarter-finals
3	Cruz Azul	36	20	8	8	91	45	+46	48	Qualification for the quarter-finals
4	Necaxa	36	16	14	6	69	38	+31	46	Qualification for the quarter-finals
5	UAG (C)	36	14	14	8	50	47	+3	42	Qualification for the Repechaje (Note: Teams ranked 5th, 7th, 9th and 11th in the table qualified for Repechaje)

Source: Liga MX
Rules for classification: 1) Points; 2) Goal difference; 3) Number of goals scored; 4) Head-to-head results between tied teams; 5) Number of goals scored away; 6) Highest relegation coefficient; 7) Fair Play points
(C) Champions

===== Results by round =====
Round	1	2	3	4	5	6	7	8	9	10	11	12	13	14	15	16	17	18	19	20	21	22	23	24	25	26	27	28	29	30	31	32	33	34	35	36	37	38
Ground	A	H	A	H	A	H	A	H	A	A	H	A	H	A	H	A	H	A	H	H	A	H	A	H	A	H	A	H	H	A	H	A	H	A	H	A	H	A
Result	L	W	D	W	L	D	W	D	-	W	L	W	W	D	W	W	W	W	L	W	W	W	D	W	D	W	L	-	W	D	D	W	W	W	W	W	W	L
Position	12	8	7	4	8	8	5	4	8	5	6	5	4	5	3	3	3	3	3	3	3	3	3	3	3	3	3	3	3	3	3	3	3	2	2	1	1	1

Source: Competitive matches
A = Away; H = Home; W = Win; D = Draw; L = Loss; P = Postponed; = Leader, Qualification for the quarter-finals; C = Qualification for the quarter-finals as group leader.; E = Qualification for the quarter-finals as group runner-up.; R = Qualification for the Repechaje.

==== Matches ====
4 September 1994 1	Santos Laguna	3–2	Guadalajara	Torreon
	Galindo 31', 82'; Bejines 56'		52' (pen.), 69' (pen.) de la Torre	Stadium: Corona

11 September 1994 2	Guadalajara	3–1	Cruz Azul	Guadalajara
	Espinosa 40' de la Torre 59'; Zarate 89'		27' Islas	Stadium: Jalisco

18 September 1994 3	Atlético Morelia	2–2	Guadalajara	Morelia
	Juan Antonio Flores Barrera 15'; Arturo Reyna 84'		14' Alberto García; 77' Manuel Vidrio	Stadium: Morelos

25 September 1994 4	Guadalajara	4–1	Atlante FC	Guadalajara
	de la Torre 29' (pen.), 50' (pen.); Felipe de Jesús Robles 64'; Guzman 68'		31' (pen.) Salvador	Stadium: Jalisco

2 October 1994 5	Correcaminos UAT	3–1	Guadalajara	Ciudad Victoria
	Arnold Cruz 23'; Carlos Orozco 36'; Sergio Almaguer 65'		59' Guzman	Stadium: Marte R.Gomez

9 October 1994 6	Guadalajara	1–1	Tigres UANL	Guadalajara
	Guzman 72'		54' Gilson da Costa	Stadium: Jalisco

16 October 1994 7	Toros Neza	1–2	Guadalajara	Ciudad Nezahualcoyotl
	Gonzalo Farfán 43'		61' Daniel Guzmán; 71'Gabriel García	Stadium: Neza 86

23 October 1994 8	Guadalajara	0–0	Puebla FC	Guadalajara
				Stadium: Jalisco

30 October 1994 9	Leones Negros UdeG	bye	Guadalajara	Guadalajara
				Stadium: Jalisco

5 November 1994 10	Veracruz	1–4	Guadalajara	Veracruz
	José Luis González China 52' (pen.)		35'José Manuel de la Torre; 38' (o.g.) Pedro Pablo Osorio; 82' Ignacio Vázquez; 89' Alberto Coyote	Stadium: Pirata Fuente

13 November 1994 11	Guadalajara	3–4	America	Guadalajara
	Ramón Ramírez 36', 41'; Daniel Guzmán 46' (pen.)		16' Kalusha Bwalya; 42' Francois-Omam Biyik; 55' Luis Roberto Alves; 66' Cuauhtémoc Blanco	Stadium: Jalisco

19 November 1994 12	Pumas UNAM	0–2	Guadalajara	Tlalpan
			13'Carlos Turrubiates; 43' Misael Espinosa	Stadium: Olimpico Universitario

27 November 1994 13	Guadalajara	1–0	Tampico Madero	Guadalajara
	Alberto Coyote 21'			Stadium: Jalisco

7 December 1994 14	Necaxa	1–1	Guadalajara	Tlalpan
	Luis Hernández 49'		24' Alberto García	Stadium: Azteca

4 December 1994 15	Guadalajara	2–0	CD Toluca	Guadalajara
	Daniel Guzmán 3', 31'			Stadium: Jalisco

10 December 1994 16	CF Monterrey	1–2	Guadalajara	Monterrey
	Carlos Alberto Bianchezi "Careca" 74'		63' Ramón Ramírez; 72'Daniel Guzmán	Stadium: Tecnológico

18 December 1994 17	Guadalajara	2–1	Leon	Guadalajara
	Daniel Guzmán 27' Ignacio Vázquez 76' (pen.)		70' (pen.)Luis Antonio Valdez	Stadium: Jalisco

23 December 1994 18	Atlas FC	0–1	Guadalajara	Guadalajara
			27'Carlos Turrubiates	Stadium: Jalisco

30 December 1994 19	Guadalajara	2–3	Tecos UAG	Guadalajara
	Missael Espinosa 43', 50'		22', 42' Osmar Donizette, 26' (pen.) Hugo Aparecido	Stadium: Jalisco

8 January 1995 20	Guadalajara	3–1	Santos Laguna	Guadalajara
	Missael Espinosa 12', 29'; José Manuel de la Torre 85'		59' (pen.) Héctor Adomaitis	Stadium: Jalisco

21	Cruz Azul	0–1	Guadalajara	Tlalpan
			28'José Manuel de la Torre	Stadium: Azteca

22	Guadalajara	2–0	Atlético Morelia	Guadalajara
	Daniel Guzmán 79'; Guillermo Hernández 82'			Stadium: Jalisco

23	Atlante FC	1–1	Guadalajara
	Rubén Omar Romano 20'		89' Daniel Guzmán

24	Guadalajara	3–1	Correcaminos UAT	Guadalajara
	Missael Espinosa 36', 65' (pen.); Daniel Guzmán 87'		38' Leopoldo Castañeda	Stadium: Jalisco

25	Tigres UANL	2–2	Guadalajara	San Nicolas de los Garza
	Antonio Carlos Santos 54'; Francisco Javier Cruz 86'		33' Missael Espinosa; 77' Daniel Guzmán	Stadium: Universitario

26	Guadalajara	2–1	Toros Neza	Guadalajara
	Missael Espinosa 84'; Manuel Vidrio 86'		Gonzalo Farfán 63'	Stadium: Jalisco

8 March 1995 27	Puebla FC	1–0	Guadalajara	Puebla de los Angeles
	Antonio Teodoro Dos Santos "Toninhho" 35'			Stadium: Cuauhtemoc

5 March 1995 28	Guadalajara	bye	Leones Negros UdeG	Guadalajara
				Stadium: Jalisco

12 March 1995 29	Guadalajara	5–0	Veracruz	Guadalajara
	Ignacio Vázquez 26', 75'; Espinosa 34'; Daniel Guzmán 85'; Alberto García 87'			Stadium: Jalisco

19 March 1995 30	America	0–0	Guadalajara	Tlalpan
				Stadium: Azteca

26 March 1995 31	Guadalajara	1–1	Pumas UNAM	Guadalajara
	Ignacio Vázquez 1'		67' Juan Carreño	Stadium: Jalisco

2 April 1995 32	TM Gallos Blancos	0–1	Guadalajara	Queretaro
			73' Jorge Arreola	Stadium: Corregidora

6 April 1995 33	Guadalajara	4–0	Necaxa	Guadalajara
	Omar Arellano 24'; Espinosa 35'; Ramón Ramírez 68'; Jorge Arreola 75'			Stadium: Jalisco

9 April 1995 34	CD Toluca	1–2	Guadalajara	Toluca
	Marcelino Bernal 85'		4' Daniel Guzmán; 40' Manuel Martínez	Stadium: La Bombonera

16 April 1995 35	Guadalajara	2–1	CF Monterrey	Guadalajara
	Missael Espinosa 13'; Ramón Ramírez 77'		48' Mario Jáuregui	Stadium: Jalisco

23 April 1995 36	Leon	0–4	Guadalajara	Leon de los Aldama
			49' (pen.) Ignacio Vázquez; 60' Ramón Ramírez; 65' Manuel Vidrio; 87' Camilo Romero	Stadium: Nou Camp

30 April 1995 37	Guadalajara	2–1	Atlas FC	Guadalajara
	Camilo Romero 18'; Ignacio Vázquez 25' (pen.)		89' Héctor López	Stadium: Jalisco

5 May 1995 38	Tecos UAG	1–0	Guadalajara	Zapopan
	Felipe del Ángel Malibrán 86'			Stadium: 3 de Marzo

== Statistics ==
=== Players statistics ===
No.	Pos	Nat	Player	Total		Liga		Copa	
No.	Pos	Nat	Player	Apps	Goals	Apps	Goals	Apps	Goals
1	GK	(Mexico) MEX	Eduardo Fernández	29	-24	29	-24		
2	DF	(Mexico) MEX	Noé Zárate	34	1	30+4	1		
3	DF	(Mexico) MEX	Manuel Vidrio	34	3	34	3		
13	DF	(Mexico) MEX	Guillermo Hernández	19	1	19	1		
5	DF	(Mexico) MEX	Camilo Romero	26	2	26	2		
23	MF	(Mexico) MEX	Alberto "Guamerú" García	26	3	24+2	3		
27	MF	(Mexico) MEX	Omar Arellano	28	1	19+9	1		
6	MF	(Mexico) MEX	Alberto Coyote	34	2	34	2		
7	MF	(Mexico) MEX	Ramón Ramírez	32	6	32	6		
58	FW	(Mexico) MEX	Daniel Guzman	34	15	34	15		
15	FW	(Mexico) MEX	Missael Espinoza	36	13	35+1	13		
17	GK	(Mexico) MEX	Celestino Morales	7	-11	7	-11		
4	DF	(Mexico) MEX	Carlos Turrubiates	22	2	19+3	2		
8	MF	(Mexico) MEX	José Manuel de la Torre	21	8	18+3	8		
18	DF	(Mexico) MEX	Jorge Arreola	19	2	10+9	2		
25	DF	(Mexico) MEX	Felipe de J. Robles	13	1	10+3	1		
9	FW	(Mexico) MEX	Ignacio Vázquez	22	7	8+14	7		
11	FW	(Mexico) MEX	Manuel Martínez	16	1	7+9	1		
10	FW	(Mexico) MEX	Luis Flores	3	0	1+2	0		
16	FW	(Mexico) MEX	Gabriel García	2	1	0+2	1		
29	MF	(Mexico) MEX	Paulo César Chávez	3	0	0+3	0		

- Source: http://yalma.fime.uanl.mx/~futmx/MFL/Mex95/News/norte29my95a.html
