= 1994–95 Club Atlético Morelia season =

Club Atletico Morelia
1994–95 season
- Owner: Nicandro Ortiz
- President: Nicandro Ortiz
- Manager: Antonio Carbajal
- Stadium: Morelos
- Primera Division: 15th
- Copa Mexico: Quarterfinals
- Top goalscorer: Figueroa (19 goals)
Home colours	Away colours
- All statistics correct as of 27 January 2019.

The 1994–95 Club Atlético Morelia season is the 71st campaign in existence and 13th consecutive season in the top flight division of Mexican football.

== Summary ==
In summertime chairman Nicandro Ortiz in his 12th as club president reinforced the squad with several players not a lot of transfers due to financial worries given the lack of support by State Government of Michoacan. For this season the team was gathered in Group 1 amongst America, Necaxa, Incumbent Champions Tecos UAG and Tigres UANL evidently a difficult group with low chances to clinch postseason, hence, the expectatives were centered undoubtedly in avoiding the relegation against Toros Neza, Correcaminos UAT and Tampico Madero.

The squad clinched its objective thanks to a superb performance of Chilean striker Marco Antonio Figueroa scoring 19 goals with a decent performance of the offensive line despite the poor performance delivered by the defensive line. The foreign arrivals but Figueroa had an irregular campaign Chileans Vera and Luis H. Perez played in a mediocre season added to the low-level showed by Uruguayan Goalkeeper Burguez.

However, the team managed by Antonio Carbajal in his 10th season as head coach finished in a low 15th spot overall, 4th in the group and 5 points behind CD Veracruz the last spot for Playoff with serious relegation problems for the next season.

== Squad ==
Note: Flags indicate national team as defined under FIFA eligibility rules; some limited exceptions apply. Players may hold more than one non-FIFA nationality.

No.	Pos.	Nation	Player
—	GK	URU	Hector Burguez
—	DF	MEX	Roberto Hernandez
—	DF	MEX	Arturo Reyna
—	DF	CHI	Pedro Jaque
—	DF	MEX	Francisco Javier Gomez
—	MF	CHI	Jaime Vera
—	MF	MEX	Jorge Guerrero
—	MF	MEX	Mario Juarez
—	MF	CHI	Luis Hernan Perez
—	MF	MEX	Jose Juan Morales
—	FW	CHI	Marco Antonio Figueroa

No.	Pos.	Nation	Player
—	GK	MEX	Jose Luis Rodriguez
—	DF	USA	Cle Kooiman
—	DF	USA	Jorge Salcedo
—	DF	MEX	Guillermo Huerta
—	MF	MEX	Carlos Barra
—	MF	MEX	Humberto Roon
—	MF	MEX	Rafael Jardon
—	MF	MEX	Antonio Gutierrez
—	MF	MEX	Hector Gonzalez
—	MF	MEX	Enrique Morales
—	FW	MEX	Hugo Santana
—	FW	MEX	Juan Antonio Flores Barrera

=== Transfers ===
In
Pos.	Name	from	Type
GK	Hector Burguez	Progreso	
DF	Pedro Jaque	Cobreloa	
MF	Roberto Hernandez	Monterrey	
MF	Guillermo Huerta	América	
FW	Rafael Jardón	CD Toluca	
FW	Hugo Santana	Cruz Azul	
FW	Juan Antonio Flores Barrera	Santos Laguna	

Out
Pos.	Name	To	Type
GK	Alberto Aguilar	Tigres UANL	

==== Winter ====
In
Pos.	Name	from	Type

Out
Pos.	Name	To	Type

== Competitions ==
=== La Liga ===
==== League table ====
===== Group 3 =====
Pos	Team	Pld	W	D	L	GF	GA	GD	Pts	Qualification or relegation
1	Cruz Azul	36	20	8	8	91	45	+46	48	Playoff
2	Veracruz	36	12	11	13	43	51	−8	35	Playoff
3	Atlante	36	11	11	14	57	69	−12	33	
4	Morelia	36	9	12	15	54	75	−21	30	
5	Correcaminos	36	9	10	17	42	65	−23	28	Relegated

===== General table =====
Pos	Team	Pld	W	D	L	GF	GA	GD	Pts
13	Atlas	36	12	8	16	43	52	−9	32
14	Leon	36	11	9	16	39	55	−16	31
15	Morelia	36	9	12	15	54	75	−21	30
16	Toluca	36	10	8	18	44	57	−13	28
17	UAT	36	9	10	17	42	65	−23	28

Source: Liga MX
Rules for classification: 1) Points; 2) Goal difference; 3) Number of goals scored; 4) Head-to-head results between tied teams; 5) Number of goals scored away; 6) Highest relegation coefficient; 7) Fair Play points

===== Results by round =====
Round	1	2	3	4	5	6	7	8	9	10	11	12	13	14	15	16	17	18	19	20	21	22	23	24	25	26	27	28	29	30	31	32	33	34	35	36	37	38
Ground	A	H	A	H	A	H	A	H	A	H	A	H	H	A	H	A	H	A	H	H	A	H	A	H	A	H	A	H	A	H	A	A	H	A	H	A	H	A
Result	W	W	L	L	D	W	L	W	W	L	-	D	D	W	D	L	W	D	W	D	L	D	L	D	W	L	W	L	L	-	L	D	D	D	W	W	L	L
Position	7	14	13	17	15	17	12	15	13	10	14	12	7	7	7	6	6	5	7	7	7	7	9	9	10	11	10	10	10	11	12	13	14	15	16	15	15	15

Source: Competitive matches
A = Away; H = Home; W = Win; D = Draw; L = Loss; P = Postponed; = Leader, Qualification for the quarter-finals; C = Qualification for the quarter-finals as group leader.; E = Qualification for the quarter-finals as group runner-up.; R = Qualification for the Repechaje.

==== Matches ====
4 September 1994 1	Morelia	2–1	Tigres UANL	Morelia
	Hugo Santana 33'; Roberto Hernández 59'		22' (pen.) Dante Juárez	Stadium: Morelos

11 September 1994 2	Toros Neza	5–0	Morelia	Ciudad Nezahualcoyotl
	Guillermo Vázquez 8' (pen.); Gonzalo Farfan 35'; Apolinar Cortés 65', 89'; Perea 78'			Stadium: Estadio Neza 86

18 September 1994 3	Morelia	2–2	CD Guadalajara	Morelia
	Flores Barrera 15'; Arturo Reyna 84'		14' Alberto García; 77' Vidrio	Stadium: Morelos

25 September 1994 4	Leones Negros UdeG	bye	Morelia	Guadalajara
				Stadium: Jalisco

2 October 1994 5	Morelia	0–0	C.D. Veracruz	Morelia
				Stadium: Morelos

7 October 1994 6	America	7–3	Morelia	Tlalpan
	Kalusha 10'; Biyik 21', 24'; Zague 42'; Biyik 58' del Olmo 70'; Biyik 75'		1' (pen.) Figueroa; 3' Juan Morales; 63' Roberto Hernández	Stadium: Azteca

16 October 1994	Morelia	6–2	Pumas UNAM	Morelia
	Juan Morales 3'; Figueroa 18', 39', 77'; Hugo Santana 67'; Luis Hernán Pérez 73'		31' Israel López; 54' (pen.) Jorge Campos	Stadium: Morelos

22 October 1994	Tampico Madero	4–0	Morelia	Tampico
	Carlos Hernández 43'; Héctor del Ángel 74'; 83'; René Mendieta 89'			Stadium: Tamaulipas

30 October 1994 9	Morelia	0–0	Necaxa	Morelia
				Stadium: Morelos

6 November 1994 10	CD Toluca	1–2	Morelia	Toluca
	Bernal 88'		43' Figueroa; 66' Arturo Reyna	Stadium: La Bombonera

13 November 1994 11	Morelia	1–2	CF Monterrey	Morelia
	Figueroa 3';		59' Arellano; 60' Oscar Pantoja	Stadium: Morelos

19 November 1994 12	Leon	2–5	Morelia	Leon de los Aldama
	Dezotti 17', 87' (pen.)		26'Jaime Vera; 33', 39' (pen.), 50' Figueroa; 53' Hugo Santana	Stadium: Nou Camp

27 November 1994 13	Morelia	4–1	Atlas FC	Morelia
	Mario Juárez 12'; Figueroa 71' (pen.), 88'; Luis Hernán Pérez 77'		7' Cristian Domizzi	Stadium: Morelos

1 December 1994 14	Tecos UAG	0–0	Morelia	Zapopan
				Stadium: 3 de Marzo

4 December 1994 15	Morelia	2–2	Santos Laguna	Morelia
	Vera 19'; Santana 80'		40' Adomaitis; 51' Galindo	Stadium: Morelos

10 December 1994	Cruz Azul	1–3	Morelia	Tlalpan
	Carlos Hermosillo 19'		25' Figueroa; 33' Huerta; 60' Flores Barrera	Stadium: Azteca

18 December 1994	Puebla FC	1–1	Morelia	Puebla de los Angeles
	Milton Queiroz "Tita" 47'		13' José Juan Morales	Stadium: Cuauhtemoc

23 December 1994 18	Morelia	2–1	Atlante FC	Morelia
	Arturo Reyna 12'; Luis Hernán Pérez 32'		50' Wilson Graneolatti	Stadium: Morelos

29 December 1994 19	Correcaminos UAT	0–0	Morelia	Ciudad Victoria
				Stadium: Marte R.Gomez

7 January 1995 20	Tigres UANL	1–1	Morelia	San Nicolas de los Garza
	Lozano 23';		55' José Juan Morales	Stadium: Universitario

14 January 1995	Morelia	1–3	Toros Neza	Morelia
	Flores Barrera 68'		55' Mohamed; 58' Villalonga; 62' Farfan	Stadium: Morelos

22 January 1995 22	CD Guadalajara	2–0	Morelia	Guadalajara
	Daniel Guzmán 79'; Guillermo Hernández 82'			Stadium: Jalisco

29 January 1995 23	Morelia	bye	Leones Negros UdeG	Morelia
				Stadium: Morelos

4 February 1995 24	C.D. Veracruz	0–0	Morelia	Veracruz
				Stadium: Pirata Fuente

12 February 1995 25	Morelia	1–6	America	Morelia
	Hugo Santana 59'		26', 27' Kalusha; 72' Juan Hernández; 85' Biyik; 87', 89' Zague	Stadium: Morelos

17 February 1995 26	Pumas UNAM	5–0	Atlético Morelia	Tlalpan
	Jorge Santillana 30', 65'; Braulio Luna 36'; Rafael García 46'; Miguel Ángel Carreón 71'			Stadium: Olimpico Universitario

26 February 1995 27	Atlético Morelia	4–2	TM Gallos Blancos	Morelia
	Figueroa 2', 9' (pen.), 85' (pen.); Francisco Javier Gómez 83'		6' Claudio Úbeda; 71' Gerardo Jiménez	Stadium: Morelos

4 March 1995 28	Necaxa	2–2	Morelia	Tlalpan
	Dominic Kinnear 36'; Sergio Zárate 58'		27' Héctor González; 30' Roberto Hernández	Stadium: Azteca

12 March 1995 29	Morelia	1–2	CD Toluca	Morelia
	Luis Hernán Pérez 37'		50' Abundis; 88' Cardozo	Stadium: Morelos

18 March 1995 30	CF Monterrey	2–1	Atlético Morelia	Monterrey
	Mario Jáuregui 20', 80'		12' Figueroa	Stadium: Tecnológico

26 March 1995 31	Morelia	2–3	Leon	Morelia
	Luis Hernán Pérez 54'; Pedro Jaque 89'		12', 59' Ayipei; 16' Gustavo Dezotti	Stadium: Morelos

1 April 1995 32	Atlas FC	1–1	Atlético Morelia	Guadalajara
	Eduardo Berizzo 43' (pen.)		56' Figueroa	Stadium: Jalisco

5 April 1995 33	Atlético Morelia	1–1	Tecos UAG	Morelia
	Mario Juárez 35'		65' Claudio Morena	Stadium: Morelos

9 April 1995 34	Santos Laguna	2–0	Atlético Morelia	Torreon
	Miguel Asprilla 10', 70'			Stadium: Corona

15 April 1995 35	Morelia	2–3	Cruz Azul	Morelia
	Figueroa 83' (pen.); Pedro Jaque 88'		3' Julio Zamora; 54', 56' Hermosillo	Stadium: Morelos

23 April 1995 36	Atlético Morelia	0–2	Puebla FC	Morelia
			44' Jesús Eduardo Córdova; 67' Toninho	Stadium: Morelos

28 April 1995 37	Atlante	4–1	Atlético Morelia	Coyoacan
	Salvador 49' (pen.), 64' (pen.); Guillermo Cantú 56'; Romano 61'		Jaime Vera 47'	Stadium: Azteca

6 May 1995 38	Morelia	3–2	Correcaminos UAT	Morelia
	Figueroa 3'; Jaime Vera 7'; Enrique Morales 44'		28' Sergio Almaguer; 75' James Cantero	Stadium: Morelos

== Statistics ==
=== Goalscorers ===
19. (Chile) Marco Antonio Figueroa
