= 1994–95 Club León season =

Club León
1994-95 season
- President: Roberto Zermeño
- Manager: Roberto Saporiti (until 20 November 1994); Jose Guadalupe Diaz
- Stadium: Nou Camp
- Primera Division: 14th
- Copa Mexico: Group stage
- Top goalscorer: Gustavo Dezotti (13 goals)
Home colours	Away colours
- All statistics correct as of 27 January 2019.

The 1994–95 Club León season is the 55th season in the football club's history and the 5th consecutive season in the top flight of Mexican football.

== Summary ==
In summertime President Zermeño appointed Roberto Saporiti as new manager of the club. Saporiti arrived from Necaxa (1991-94) being credited of building the core of upcoming back-to-back Champions with transfers in such as Alex Aguinaga, Alberto Garcia Aspe, Ignacio Ambriz and Ivo Basay. The squad was reinforced with several players: midfielder Marcelo Balboa on loaned from Major League Soccer which inaugural season was delayed until 1996, Forward Gerardo Reinoso from Correcaminos UAT and 30-yr-old Gustavo Dezotti arriving from US Cremonese. Club legend Milton Queiroz "Tita" left the club transferred out to Puebla FC.

However, Saporiti was sacked on round 12 after a humiliating defeat 2-5 at home against Atlético Morelia, being replaced as head coach by Jose Guadalupe Diaz for the rest of the season. The squad improved its performance delivering a decent second half of the league season aimed with goals scored by "ageing" Gustavo Dezotti who became crutial to compete for the last Playoff spot although, finally, the club was eliminated by just two points not classifying for post season for the second consecutive year.

== Squad ==
Note: Flags indicate national team as defined under FIFA eligibility rules; some limited exceptions apply. Players may hold more than one non-FIFA nationality.

No.	Pos.	Nation	Player
1	GK	MEX	Adrian Martinez
—	MF	USA	Marcelo Balboa
—	DF	BRA	Uidemar
—	DF	MEX	Alfredo Murguia
7	MF	MEX	Raul Martinez
4	DF	MEX	Jimmy Lopez
—	FW	ARG	Gustavo Dezotti
—	MF	MEX	Victor Hugo Garcia Reza
19	MF	MEX	Sergio Martinez
8	MF	MEX	Roberto Garcia Reza
6	MF	ARG	Gerardo Reinoso

No.	Pos.	Nation	Player
24	GK	MEX	Marco Ferreira
58	FW	GHA	Isaac Ayipei
20	FW	MEX	Luis Antonio Valdéz
—	DF	MEX	Guillermo Muñoz
—	DF	MEX	Ricardo Cadena
—	MF	MEX	Ricardo Rayas
—	MF	MEX	Ricardo Enriquez
—	MF	MEX	Luis Humberto Salazar
4	DF	MEX	Daniel Alcantar

=== Transfers ===
In
Pos.	Name	from	Type
FW	Gustavo Dezotti	U.S. Cremonese	
MF	Gerardo Reinoso	Correcaminos UAT	
MF	Marcelo Balboa		
MF	Victor Santos	CD Guadalajara	
DF	Luis Humberto Salazar	Atlas FC	

Out
Pos.	Name	To	Type
FW	Tita	Puebla FC	
FW	Marquinho	Veracruz	

==== Winter ====
In
Pos.	Name	from	Type

Out
Pos.	Name	To	Type

== Competitions ==
=== La Liga ===
==== League table ====
===== Group 1 =====
Pos	Team	Pld	W	D	L	GF	GA	GD	Pts	Qualification
1	Santos Laguna	36	13	9	14	61	62	−1	35	Playoff
2	Monterrey	36	9	15	12	37	52	−15	33	Playoff
3	Atlas	36	12	8	16	43	52	−9	32	
4	León	36	11	9	16	39	55	−16	31	

===== General table =====
Pos	Team	Pld	W	D	L	GF	GA	GD	Pts
12	Toros Neza	36	12	8	16	55	62	−7	32
13	Atlas	36	12	8	16	43	52	−9	32
14	Leon	36	11	9	16	39	55	−16	31
15	Morelia	36	9	12	15	54	75	−21	30
16	Toluca	36	10	8	18	44	57	−13	28

Source: Liga MX
Rules for classification: 1) Points; 2) Goal difference; 3) Number of goals scored; 4) Head-to-head results between tied teams; 5) Number of goals scored away; 6) Highest relegation coefficient; 7) Fair Play points

===== Results by round =====
Round	1	2	3	4	5	6	7	8	9	10	11	12	13	14	15	16	17	18	19	20	21	22	23	24	25	26	27	28	29	30	31	32	33	34	35	36	37	38
Ground	A	H	A	H	A	H	A	H	A	H	A	H	H	A	H	A	H	A	H	H	A	H	A	H	A	H	A	H	A	H	A	A	H	A	H	A	H	A
Result	L	D	W	L	D	D	L	W	D	W	L	L	L	D	D	D	L	-	L	L	W	W	L	L	W	W	L	L	L	D	W	D	L	W	W	L	-	W
Position	15	17	8	12	13	12	14	10	10	9	10	13	14	14	14	14	15	16	18	18	15	14	17	18	17	14	15	16	17	17	17	17	17	16	14	14	14	14

Source: Competitive matches
A = Away; H = Home; W = Win; D = Draw; L = Loss; P = Postponed; = Leader, Qualification for the quarter-finals; C = Qualification for the quarter-finals as group leader.; E = Qualification for the quarter-finals as group runner-up.; R = Qualification for the Repechaje.

==== Matches ====
4 September 1994 1	Leon	0-2	America	Irapuato
			26' Zague; 73' Zague	Stadium: Sergio Leon Chavez
Note: Match not played in Leon de los Aldama due to a ban on Nou Camp

10 September 1994 2	Pumas UNAM	3-3	León	Tlalpan
	Antonio Sancho 4'; Eduardo Medina 55'; Rafael García 75'		31' Reinoso; 47' Dezotti; 81' Luis Salazar	Stadium: Olimpico Universitario

18 September 1994 3	León	3-0	Tampico Madero	Leon de los Aldama
	Isaac Ayipei 60'; Alfredo Murguía 67'; Luis Antonio Valdez 89'			Stadium: Nou Camp

24 September 1994 4	Necaxa	1-0	Leon	Tlalpan
	Víctor Escalera 39'			Stadium: Azteca

2 October 1994 5	León	2-2	Toluca	Leon de los Aldama
	Luis Antonio Valdez 39' (pen.); Dezotti 50'		16' Marcelino Bernal , 77' Claudio Sppontón	Stadium: Nou Camp

8 October 1994 6	CF Monterrey	0-0	León	Monterrey
				Stadium: Tecnológico

16 October 1994 7	Puebla FC	2-1	León	Puebla de los Angeles
	Paúl René Moreno 23'; Milton Queiroz 88'		13' (pen.) Luis Antonio Valdez	Stadium: Cuauhtemoc

23 October 1994 8	León	2-0	Atlas FC	Leon de los Aldama
	Dezotti 65'; Ricardo Enríquez 80'			Stadium: Nou Camp

28 October 1994 9	Tecos UAG	1-1	León	Zapopan
	Fernando Guijarro 66'		81' Dezotti	Stadium: 3 de Marzo

6 November 1994 10	León	1-0	Santos Laguna	Leon de los Aldama
	Dezotti 75'			Stadium: Nou Camp

12 November 1994 11	Cruz Azul	6-0	León	Tlalpan
	Octavio Mora 29'; Carlos Hermosillo 32', 64', 69'; Pedro Duana 46', Víctor Ruiz 75'			Stadium: Azteca

19 November 1994 12	León	2-5	Atlético Morelia	Leon de los Aldama
	Dezotti 17', 87' (pen.)		26'Vera; 33', 39' (pen.), 50' Figueroa , 53' Santana	Stadium: Nou Camp

27 November 1994 13	Atlante	3-2	Club León	Benito Juarez
	Salvador 25' (pen.) 35' (pen.); Sanchez 46'		8' Isaac Ayipei; 50' (pen.) Dezotti	Stadium: Azulgrana

30 November 1994 14	León	0-0	Correcaminos UAT	Leon de los Aldama
				Stadium: Nou Camp

3 December 1994 15	Tigres UANL	1-1	León	San Nicolas de los Garza
	Mario Bueno 30'		55' (pen.) Dezotti	Stadium: Universitario

11 December 1994 16	León	1-1	Toros Neza	Leon de los Aldama
	Luis Antonio Valdez 46'		67' Oscar García	Stadium: Nou Camp

18 December 1994 17	Guadalajara	2-1	León	Guadalajara
	Daniel Guzmán 27' Ignacio Vázquez 76' (pen.)		70' (pen.)Luis Antonio Valdez	Stadium: Jalisco

22 December 1994 18	Leones Negros UdeG	bye	Leon	Guadalajara
				Stadium: Jalisco

29 December 1994 19	Veracruz	2-0	León	Veracruz
	Leonel Bolsonello 34', 47' (pen.)			Stadium: Pirata Fuente

8 January 1995 20	Club América	1-0	León	Coyoacan
	Pedro Pineda 15'			Stadium: Azteca

18 January 1995 21	León	2-0	U.N.A.M.	Leon de los Aldama
	Isaac Ayipei 25', 84'			Stadium: Nou Camp

22 January 1995 22	TM Gallos Blancos	0-1	León	Queretaro
			37'Gerardo Reynoso	Stadium: Corregidora

29 January 1995 23	León	0-4	Necaxa	Leon de los Aldama
			21'Alberto García Aspe; 75'Ricardo Peláez; 82', 88' Ivo Basay	Stadium: Nou Camp

5 February 1995 24	Toluca	1-0	León	Toluca
	Jorge Rodríguez 55'			Stadium: La Bombonera

12 February 1995 25	Leon	1-0	CF Monterrey	Leon de los Aldama
	Videmar Pessoa 69'			Stadium: Nou Camp

18 February 1995 26	Leon	1-0	Puebla FC	Leon de los Aldama
	Víctor García Reza 66'			Stadium: Nou Camp

25 February 1995 27	Atlas FC	2-0	León	Guadalajara
	Arturo Beltrán 51, Jared Borguetti 84			Stadium: Jalisco

4 March 1995 28	Leon	1-2	Tecos UAG	Leon de los Aldama
	Isaac Ayipei 63'		14', 89' Mauricio Gallaga	Stadium: Nou Camp

12 March 1995 29	Santos Laguna	2-1	Leon	Torreon
	Miguel Asprilla 4'; Héctor Adomaitis 68' (pen.)		22' Dezotti	Stadium: Corona

18 March 1995 30	Leon	1-1	Cruz Azul	Leon de los Aldama
	Gerardo Reynoso 41'		50' Víctor Ruiz	Stadium: Camp Nou

26 March 1995 31	Atlético Morelia	2-3	Leon	Morelia
	Pérez 54'; Jaque 89'		12', 59' Ayipei; 16' Dezotti	Stadium: Morelos

2 April 1995 32	Leon	0-0	Atlante FC	Leon de los Aldama
				Stadium: Nou Camp

5 April 1995 33	Correcaminos UAT	4-1	Leon	Ciudad Victoria
	de Anda 5'; James Cantero 14'; César Ovando 47' (pen.); Leopoldo Castañeda 49'		60' Jaime López	Stadium: Marte R. Gomez

9 April 1995 34	Leon	2-0	Tigres UANL	Leon de los Aldama
	Ricardo Rayas 76'; Isaac Ayipei 78' (pen.)			Stadium: Nou Camp

16 April 1995 35	Toros Neza	1-2	Leon	Ciudad Nezahualcoyotl
	Antonio Mohamed 42'		3' Raúl Martínez; 86' Dezotti	Stadium: Neza 86

23 April 1995 36	Leon	0-4	CD Guadalajara	Leon de los Aldama
			49' (pen.) Ignacio Vázquez; 60' Ramón Ramírez; 65' Manuel Vidrio; 87' Camilo Romero	Stadium: Nou Camp

30 April 1995 37	Leon	bye	Leones Negros UdeG	Leon de los Aldama
				Stadium: Nou Camp

6 May 1995 38	Club León	3-0	Veracruz	Leon de los Aldama
	Dezotti 12'; Ricardo Cadena 42'; Isaac Ayipei 84'			Stadium: Nou Camp
