= Luis Castillo =

Luis Castillo may refer to:

- Luis Castillo (American football) (born 1983), Dominican-American NFL defensive end
- Luis Castillo (basketball referee), Spanish basketball referee
- Luis Castillo (Ecuadorian boxer), boxer from Ecuador
- Luis Castillo (musician), keyboard player and backup vocalist for American rock band P.O.D.
- Luis Castillo (pitcher, born 1992) (born 1992), Dominican Major League Baseball pitcher
- Luis Castillo (pitcher, born 1995) (born 1995), Dominican Major League Baseball pitcher
- Luis Castillo (second baseman) (born 1975), Dominican Major League Baseball second baseman
- Luis Castillo Urízar (born 1869), Chilean lawyer and politician
- Luís Leandro Castillo (born 1991), Argentine footballer

== See also ==
- Luis del Castillo Estrada (1931–2026), Uruguayan cleric
- José Luis Castillo (born 1973), boxer from Mexico
- José Luis Castillo (activist) (born 1968)
