= José Castillo =

José Castillo may refer to:

== Sportspeople ==
- José Castillo (diver) (born 1911), Cuban Olympic diver
- José Castillo (runner) (born 1968), Peruvian long-distance runner
- José Antonio Castillo (born 1970), Spanish football midfielder
- José Luis Castillo (born 1973), Mexican boxer
- José Ignacio Castillo (born 1975), Argentine football player
- José Martín Castillo (boxer) (born 1977), Mexican professional boxer
- José Castillo (infielder) (1981–2018), Venezuelan baseball infielder
- José Alfredo Castillo (born 1983), Bolivian football player
- José Carlos Castillo (born 1992), Guatemalan football forward
- José Castillo (pitcher) (born 1996), Venezuelan baseball pitcher
- José Castillo (footballer) (born 2001), Mexican football right-back

== Other ==
- José Videla Castillo (1792–1832), Argentine military officer
- José Castillo (police officer) (1901–1936), murdered during the Second Spanish Republic
- José Luis Castillo (activist) (born 1968), Colombian-American activist
- José Pedro Castillo (born 1969), former president of Peru

== See also ==
- José del Castillo (1737–1793), Spanish painter
- Joey Castillo (born 1966), American musician and songwriter
