= Rubén Díaz =

Rubén Díaz may refer to:

- Rubén Díaz Sr. (born 1943), New York City Council member
- Rubén Díaz Jr. (born 1973), Borough President of the Bronx (New York City)
- Rubén Oswaldo Díaz (1946–2018), Argentine footballer
- Rubén Ruiz Díaz (born 1969), Paraguayan footballer
- Rubén Toribio Díaz (born 1952), Peruvian footballer

== See also ==
- Rubén Díez (born 1993), Spanish footballer
- Rúben Dias (born 1997), Portuguese footballer
