= Alberto Guerra =

Alberto Guerra may refer to:

- Alberto Guerra (footballer)
- Alberto Guerra (actor)
