= Gustavo Dezotti =

Argentine former football striker

Personal information
- Full name: Gustavo Abel Dezotti
- Date of birth: 14 February 1964 (age 62)
- Place of birth: Monte Buey, Argentina
- Height: 1.80 m (5 ft 11 in)
- Position: Striker

Senior career*
Years	Team	Apps	(Gls)
1982–1988	Newell's Old Boys	208	(40)
1988–1989	S.S. Lazio	29	(3)
1989–1994	U.S. Cremonese	154	(51)
1994–1996	Club León	54	(17)
1996–1997	Club Atlas	22	(1)
1998	Defensor Sporting Club	9	(1)

International career
1983	Argentina U20	3	(0)
1988–1990	Argentina	7	(1)
- * Club domestic league appearances and goals

Gustavo Abel Dezotti (born 14 February 1964) is an Argentine former footballer who played as a striker. He began his career with Newell's Old Boys in Argentina and was part of the team that won the Primera Division Argentina championship of 1987–1988.

Being part of a title winning side brought him to the attention of Major European clubs, and in 1988 he moved to Italy where he played for S.S. Lazio and then U.S. Cremonese. In 1994–95, he moved to Mexico to play for Club León and then Club Atlas. Dezotti's final club were Defensor Sporting Club of Uruguay where he retired in 1998.

The most notorious moment of his career came when he was the second player to be sent off by referee Edgardo Codesal in the 1–0 1990 FIFA World Cup final defeat against West Germany, joining teammate Pedro Monzón earlier in the same match.

== Honours ==
Newell's Old Boys

- Primera División: 1987–88

U.S. Cremonese

- Anglo-Italian Cup: 1992–93

Argentina

- FIFA World Cup runner-up: 1990
