= Jorge Arreola Barraza =

Mexican photographer, conceptual and performance artist

- Born: Jorge Arreola Barraza; 1985/12/08; Ciudad Juárez, Chihuahua
- Citizenship: Mexican
- Occupation(s): Photographer, conceptual, performance artist
- Years active: 2005– present
- Known for: documentary photographing

Jorge Arreola Barraza (born 1985) is a Mexican photographer and conceptual and performance artist. He is best known for his urban documentary photography of his hometown Ciudad Juárez, Mexico. He exhibits worldwide.
