= Alexander Quirin =

German footballer

Personal information
- Date of birth: 27 February 1970 (age 56)
- Position: Midfielder

Senior career*
Years	Team	Apps	(Gls)
–1988	ASC Dudweiler		
1988–1993	FC 08 Homburg		
1993–1998	Borussia Neunkirchen		
1998–1999	SV Mettlach		
1999–2005	SSV Überherrn		
- * Club domestic league appearances and goals

Alexander Quirin (born 27 February 1970) is a retired German football defender.
