= Luís Leandro Castillo =

Argentine footballer

Personal information
- Full name: Luís Leandro Castillo
- Date of birth: 12 February 1991 (age 35)
- Place of birth: Rosario del Tala, Argentina
- Height: 1.79 m (5 ft 10 1/2 in)
- Position: Defender

Youth career
- Colón

Senior career*
Years	Team	Apps	(Gls)
2012–2016	Colón	62	(0)
2016–2017	Instituto	15	(1)
2018	Atlético Tala		
2018–2020	Gimnasia y Esgrima	6	(0)
- * Club domestic league appearances and goals

Luís Leandro Castillo (born 12 February 1991) is an Argentine professional footballer who plays as a defender.

== Career ==
Castillo started his career with Colón. Having come through their academy, Castillo was promoted into the Primera División club's senior squad for the 2012–13 season to make his professional bow on 16 March 2013 against San Lorenzo. He made fourteen appearances in his first season, before appearing twenty-five times in 2013–14 as they were relegated to the second tier. Instant promotion back was won in his third campaign, with him participating in thirteen matches as they finished top of Zone A. In July 2016, Instituto of Primera B Nacional signed Castillo. He netted his first goal in a September draw with Douglas Haig.

Instituto released Castillo in August 2017 after sixteen games and one goal for the club. On 16 March 2018, Castillo joined regional side Atlético Tala; he had trained with the team since January. Four months later, Castillo returned to Primera B Nacional with Gimnasia y Esgrima. His first appearance came on 6 October in an away match against Quilmes. He featured in a further five fixtures in 2018–19, before not playing at all in 2019–20 prior to being released at the end of the campaign.

== Career statistics ==
As of 5 October 2020.

Club statistics
Club	Season	League			Cup		League Cup		Continental		Other		Total	
Club	Season	Division	Apps	Goals	Apps	Goals	Apps	Goals	Apps	Goals	Apps	Goals	Apps	Goals
Colón	2011–12	Primera División	0	0	0	0	—		—		0	0	0	0
Colón	2012–13	Primera División	14	0	0	0	—		0	0	0	0	14	0
Colón	2013–14	Primera División	24	0	0	0	—		—		1 (Note: Appearance(s) in the Primera División play-offs)	0	25	0
Colón	2014	Primera B Nacional	13	0	1	0	—		—		0	0	14	0
Colón	2015	Primera División	4	0	1	0	—		—		0	0	5	0
Colón	2016	Primera División	7	0	0	0	—		—		0	0	7	0
Colón	Total		62	0	2	0	—		0	0	1	0	65	0
Instituto	2016–17	Primera B Nacional	15	1	1	0	—		—		0	0	16	1
Gimnasia y Esgrima	2018–19	Primera B Nacional	6	0	0	0	—		—		0	0	6	0
Gimnasia y Esgrima	2019–20	Primera B Nacional	0	0	0	0	—		—		0	0	0	0
Gimnasia y Esgrima	Total		6	0	0	0	—		0	0	0	0	6	0
Career total			83	1	3	0	—		0	0	1	0	87	1
