= Clay Coleman =

Caymanian footballer

Personal information
- Full name: Franklin Clay Coleman
- Date of birth: 12 March 1970 (age 56)
- Place of birth: Cayman Islands
- Position: Goalkeeper

Team information
- Current team: George Town SC

Senior career*
Years	Team	Apps	(Gls)
- George Town SC

International career^{‡}
2004	Cayman Islands	2	(0)
- * Club domestic league appearances and goals ‡ National team caps and goals as of 16:47, 20 April 2012 (UTC)

Franklin Clay Coleman (born 12 March 1970) is a Caymanian footballer who plays as a goalkeeper. He has represented the Cayman Islands at full international level.
