= Marios Pashialis =

Cypriot footballer (born 1970)

Personal information
- Full name: Marios Pashialis
- Date of birth: October 30, 1970 (age 56)
- Place of birth: Famagusta, Cyprus
- Position: Defender

Senior career*
Years	Team	Apps	(Gls)
1989–2001	Ethnikos Achnas	125	(2)
2001–2002	Anorthosis Famagusta	9	(0)
2002–2003	Ethnikos Achnas	10	(0)

International career
	Cyprus U21	?	(?)
1994–1999	Cyprus	7	(0)
- * Club domestic league appearances and goals

Marios Pashialis (Greek: Μάριος Πασιαλής; born October 30, 1970) is a former international Cypriot football defender who played for Ethnikos Achnas of Cyprus. He also played for Anorthosis Famagusta.

He has 7 international caps with Cyprus national football team.
