= Salvador Reyes (footballer, born 1968) =

Mexican footballer and manager (born 1968)

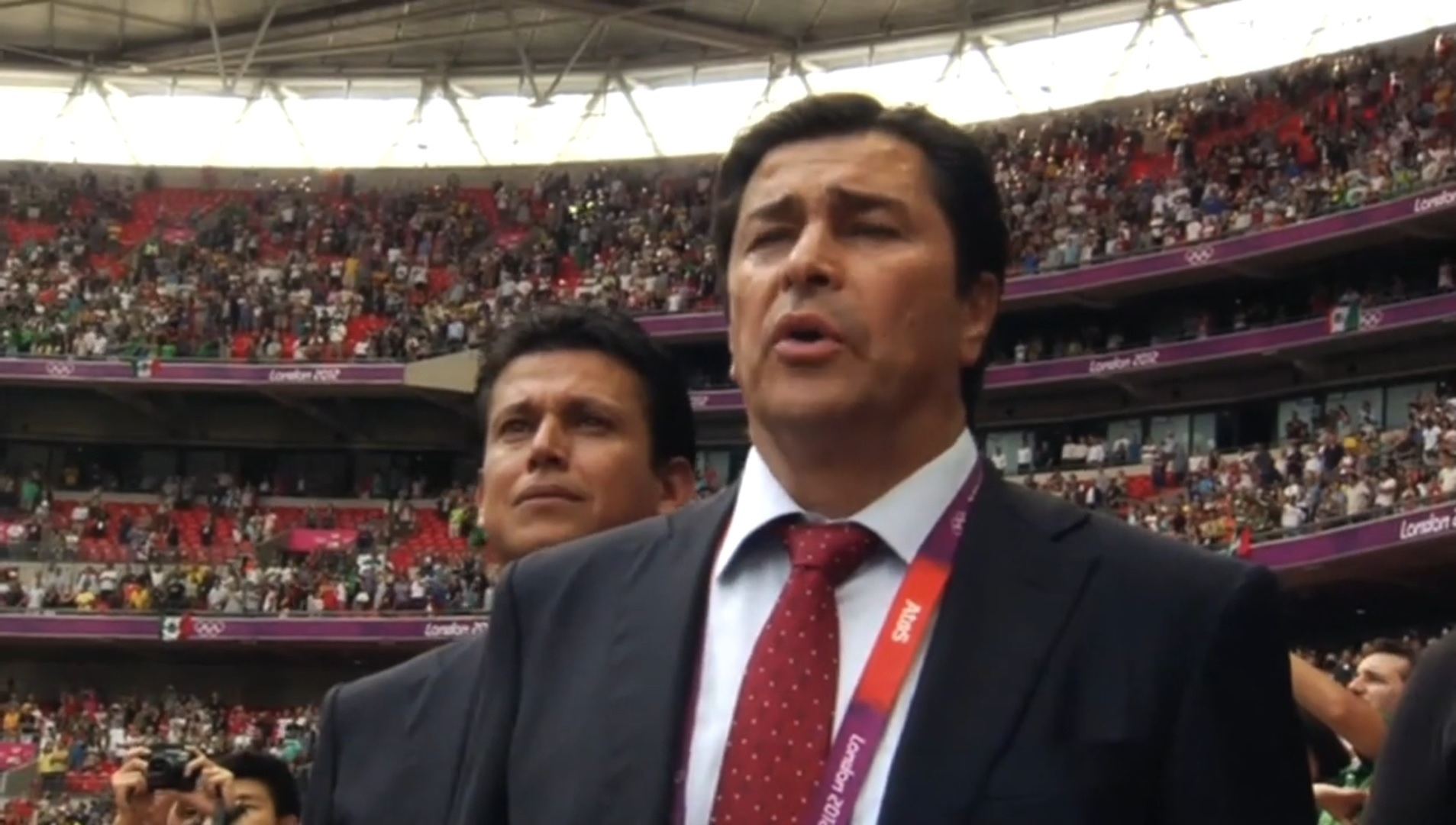
- Reyes (left) at the 2012 Summer Olympics

Personal information
- Full name: Salvador Luis Reyes de la Peña
- Date of birth: 28 September 1968 (age 58)
- Place of birth: Los Angeles, California, U.S.
- Height: 1.76 m (5 ft 9 in)

Team information
- Current team: Guatemala (assistant)

Senior career*
Years	Team	Apps	(Gls)
1988–1991	Leones Negros		
1991–1995	Puebla		
1995–1996	Guadalajara		
1996–1997	Celaya		

Managerial career
- 2004–2005: Tigres B
- 2005–2007: Querétaro
- 2007: Necaxa (assistant)
- 2008–2009: Necaxa
- 2009: León
- 2009–2010: Santos Laguna (assistant)
- 2011–2013: Mexico (assistant)
- 2014–2015: Cruz Azul (assistant)
- 2016: León (assistant)
- 2017: Atlético San Luis
- 2018–2019: Santos Laguna
- 2019–2020: Guadalajara (assistant)
- 2021: Juárez (assistant)
- 2021–: Guatemala (assistant)
- * Club domestic league appearances and goals

Salvador Luis Reyes de la Peña (born 28 September 1968) is a Mexican former footballer and current manager of Liga MX club Santos Laguna. He is the son of former footballer Salvador Reyes Monteón.

== Career ==
Reyes was appointed as director of youth football for Santos Laguna on 19 December 2017. On 8 August 2018, Santos announced Reyes would take charge of the first team after Robert Siboldi's resignation.

== Managerial statistics ==
As of 24 November 2018

Team	From	To	Record				
Team	From	To	G	W	D	L	Win %
Atlético San Luis	2017	2017	15	5	6	4	33.33
Santos Laguna	May 2018	2019	14	6	6	2	42.86
Total			29	11	12	6	37.93
