= Pedro Massacessi =

Argentine footballer

Personal information
- Full name: Pedro Fernando Massacessi
- Date of birth: 9 January 1966 (age 60)
- Place of birth: Ceres, Santa Fe, Argentina
- Height: 1.68 m (5 ft 6 in)
- Position: Midfielder

Senior career*
| Years | Team | Apps | (Gls) |
| 1987–1989 | Independiente | 45 | (4) |
| 1989–1990 | Chaco For Ever | 20 | (3) |
| 1990 | Universidad de Chile | 15 | (0) |
| 1990–1992 | Cobras de Juárez | 40 | (1) |
| 1992–1994 | Atlante | 63 | (8) |
| 1994–1995 | UNAM | 15 | (4) |
| 1995 | Yokohama Marinos | 7 | (0) |
| 1995–1996 | Atlante | 11 | (2) |
| 1997 | FC Jazz | 8 | (0) |
- * Club domestic league appearances and goals

Pedro Fernando Massacessi (born January 9, 1966) is an Argentine former footballer who played as a midfielder.

== Teams ==
- (Argentina) Independiente 1987–1989
- (Argentina) Chaco For Ever 1989–1990
- Universidad de Chile 1990
- (Mexico) Cobras de Ciudad Juárez 1990–1992
- (Mexico) Atlante 1992–1994
- (Mexico) UNAM 1994–1995
- (Japan) Yokohama Marinos 1995
- (Mexico) Atlante 1995
- (Finland) FC Jazz 1997

== Personal life ==
Massacessi made his home in Florida, United States, and became a business owner.

== Club statistics ==
| Club performance | | | League | | Cup | | Total | |
| Season | Club | League | Apps | Goals | Apps | Goals | Apps | Goals |
| Japan | | | League | | Emperor's Cup | | Total | |
|---|---|---|---|---|---|---|---|---|
| 1995 | Yokohama Marinos | J1 League | 7 | 0 | 0 | 0 | 7 | 0 |
| Japan | | | 7 | 0 | 0 | 0 | 7 | 0 |
| Total | | | 7 | 0 | 0 | 0 | 7 | 0 |
| Finland | | | League | | Finnish Cup | | Total | |
| 1997 | FC Jazz | Veikkausliiga | 8 | 0 | 1 | 0 | 9 | 0 |
| UEFA Champions League | | | League | | Cup | | Total | |
| 1997-1998 | FC Jazz | Qualifying rounds | 0 | 0 | 3 | 0 | 3 | 0 |
| UEFA Cup | | | League | | Cup | | Total | |
| 1997-1998 | FC Jazz | 1st round | 0 | 0 | 1 | 0 | 1 | 0 |
| Total | | | 8 | 0 | 5 | 0 | 13 | 0 |
