= Rubén Ruiz Díaz =

Paraguayan footballer (born 1969)

Personal information
- Full name: Rubén Martín Ruiz Díaz Romero
- Date of birth: 11 November 1969 (age 56)
- Place of birth: Asunción, Paraguay
- Height: 1.91 m (6 ft 3 in)
- Position: Goalkeeper

Senior career*
Years	Team	Apps	(Gls)
1985–1989	Rubio Ñú		
1989–1990	Talleres		
1990–1991	San Lorenzo	61	(0)
1992–1998	Monterrey	147	(0)
1999	Puebla	12	(0)
1999	Estudiantes		
2000–2002	Talleres		
2003	Zacatepec	16	(0)
2004–2005	Necaxa	12	(0)

International career
1992	Paraguay U23		
1989–1998	Paraguay	14	(0)
- * Club domestic league appearances and goals

Rubén Martín Ruiz Díaz Romero (born 11 November 1969) is a Paraguayan former professional footballer who played as a goalkeeper. He was nicknamed "Puchi" and "La Bomba" during his career. He represented Paraguay at the 1998 FIFA World Cup. In the 1990s, he became a referent of the Mexican outfit Monterrey.

== Club career ==
Born in Asunción, Ruiz Díaz began playing football in the youth side of Club Rubio Ñu, before making his senior debut for the club at age 15. He played professional football in the Primera División Argentina and Primera División de México.

On 14 March 1993, while Ruiz Díaz was playing for Monterrey in a match against Leon, a strong shot from Leon forward Isaac Ayipei knocked Ruiz Díaz unconscious. He regained consciousness after six hours in hospital. Initial reports had indicated that he had suffered a broken jaw but that was corrected.

== International career ==
Ruiz Díaz made his international debut for the Paraguay national team on 9 July 1989 in a 1989 Copa América match against Brazil (2–0 loss). He obtained a total number of 11 international caps, earning his last cap in 1998.
