= Daniel Telser =

Liechtenstein footballer (born 1970)

Personal information
- Date of birth: 24 January 1970 (age 56)
- Position: Defender

Senior career*
Years	Team	Apps	(Gls)
1993–1999	FC Balzers		

International career
1993–1999	Liechtenstein	23	(0)
- * Club domestic league appearances and goals

Daniel Telser (born 24 January 1970) is a retired Liechtenstein football defender.
