= Gabriel García Hernández =

Mexican politician (born 1977)

Member of the Chamber of Deputies
- Incumbent
- Assumed office 1 September 2024
- Preceded by: Marcelino Castañeda Navarrete
- Constituency: 18th federal electoral district of Mexico City

Personal details
- Born: 27 March 1977 (age 49)
- Party: Morena

Gabriel García Hernández (born 27 March 1977) is a Mexican politician affiliated with the National Regeneration Movement (Morena). He has been a member of the Chamber of Deputies since 2024.

== Career ==
García Hernández was born in Miguel Hidalgo, Mexico City, in 1977. He graduated from the National Autonomous University of Mexico (UNAM) with a degree in economics and holds a master's in public finance from the Instituto Nacional de Administración Pública.

In the 2018 general election he was elected to the Senate on Morena's national list. During his six-year Senate term, he took two leaves of absence: from November 2018 to July 2021, to work on development projects in the office of the president under Andrés Manuel López Obrador; and from October 2021 to June 2022, to work on a water project in the Comarca Lagunera.

In the 2024 general election he was elected to the Chamber of Deputies to represent Mexico City's 18th district (Iztapalapa) during the 66th session of Congress.
