= Jorge Guerrero (Mexican footballer) =

Mexican footballer and manager (born 1964)

Personal information
- Full name: Jorge Guerrero López
- Date of birth: 6 October 1964 (age 62)
- Place of birth: Ixtlán de los Hervores, Michoacán, Mexico
- Height: 1.74 m (5 ft 8 1/2 in)
- Position: Midfielder

Senior career*
Years	Team	Apps	(Gls)
1984–1994	Atlético Morelia	240	(8)

Managerial career
- 2007–2008: Jaguares de Zamora (Assistant)
- 2010–2014: Monarcas Morelia Reserves and Academy
- 2015–2017: Atlas Reserves and Academy
- 2018: Real Zamora (Assistant)
- 2018: Queseros San José
- 2020–2021: La Piedad
- * Club domestic league appearances and goals

Jorge Guerrero López (born October 6, 1964) is a Mexican football manager and former player.
