= Ignacio Vázquez (footballer, born 1971) =

Mexican footballer

Personal information
- Full name: Ignacio Vázquez Barba
- Date of birth: July 31, 1971 (age 55)
- Place of birth: San Ignacio Cerro Gordo, Jalisco, Mexico
- Height: 1.78 m (5 ft 10 in)
- Position: Forward

International career
Years	Team	Apps	(Gls)
- Mexico U23
1993	Mexico	2	(0)

Ignacio Vázquez Barba (born July 31, 1971) is a Mexican former professional footballer who played as a forward.

== Career ==
Vázquez made his league debut with Chivas in the 1991–92 season. He scored 10 goals in each of the next two seasons, leading the club in scoring and winning the center forward position. In subsequent years he played less frequently, with the signing of Daniel Guzmán and the later emergence of Gustavo Napoles and Gabriel Garcia; he continued to contribute to the team as Chivas won the Verano 1997 championship. Vázquez left for Tigres in 1998, played for Atlante in 1999 and 2000, and then went to Santos Laguna where he won a second championship in 2001, although he appeared in only three matches during the season. After a stop at León and a brief return to Chivas, he played his last top-level game with Veracruz in 2004.

He was a member of the Mexico Olympic team at the 1992 Summer Olympics in Barcelona, Spain, playing in Mexico's 1–1 draw against Denmark on 26 July 1992. Vázquez also earned two caps for Mexico, making his debut on 22 September 1993 against Cameroon. His last match, in the following month, came in a 1–1 draw against the United States on 13 October at RFK Stadium in Washington, D.C.
