= Antonio Sancho =

Mexican footballer (born 1976)

Personal information
- Full name: Antonio Sancho Sánchez
- Date of birth: 14 March 1976 (age 50)
- Place of birth: Mexico City, Mexico
- Height: 1.74 m (5 ft 8 1/2 in)
- Position: Midfielder

Youth career
- 1990–1993: Pumas

Senior career*
Years	Team	Apps	(Gls)
1993–2000	Pumas	177	(18)
2000–2011	Tigres	290	(6)
2006–2007	→ Pumas (loan)	29	(0)

International career^{‡}
1997–2002	Mexico	4	(0)
Medal record
Representing Mexico
Third place	Copa America	1997
- * Club domestic league appearances and goals as of 25 May 2011 ‡ National team caps and goals as of 22 August 2007

Antonio Sancho Sánchez (14 March 1976) is a Mexican former footballer. He played as a midfielder and was the captain of Tigres and Pumas.

== Career ==
Sancho played for six years with Tigres, where he became one of the most trusted players by the fans. A huge number of fans was against his separation of the team, decided by the team's upper management and not by the coach. Among other milestones, Sancho has played 17 Clásico Regiomontano derbies with Tigres.

After Tigres, he returned to Pumas. He had originally joined Pumas youth system and worked his way through the ranks to make his first division debut, becoming an idol and the team captain. Now, in his second spell with Pumas, he has once more taken captain's armband hoping to lead the club out of the relegation position.

Sancho returned to Tigres in 2007 after the loan to Pumas expired. On 2011 he announced his retirement. A hard-tackling midfielder, Sancho was sent off thirteen times in his career.

He now returned to Tigres with a new contract as a Sport Director for the club.
