= Sebastian Synoradzki =

Polish footballer and coach

Personal information
- Date of birth: 27 November 1970 (age 55)
- Place of birth: Częstochowa, Poland
- Height: 1.78 m (5 ft 10 in)
- Position: Defender

Senior career*
| Years | Team | Apps | (Gls) |
| 1985–1992 | Raków Częstochowa | | |
| 1992–1994 | Wawel Kraków | | |
| 1994–2000 | Raków Częstochowa | | |
| 2000–2001 | Świt Nowy Dwór Mazowiecki | | |
| 2001–2002 | Astra Krotoszyn | | |
| 2002–2003 | Heko Czermno | | |
| 2003–2008 | Victoria Częstochowa | | |

Managerial career
- 2009–2010: LKS Kamienica Polska
- 2010–2011: Znicz Kłobuck
- 2011–2012: Unia Rędziny
- 2013–2016: Orły Kusięta
- * Club domestic league appearances and goals

Sebastian Synoradzki (born 27 November 1970) is a Polish football manager and former professional player who played as a defender.

His father Witold was a footballer as well, he represented Raków in the Polish Cup final in 1967.

== Playing career ==
Synoradzki played mainly in Raków Częstochowa. He played there from 1985 to 1992 and from 1994 to 2000. Between 1992 and 1994, he played for Wawel Kraków. In the spring round of the 2000–01 season, Synoradzki moved to Świt Nowy Dwór Mazowiecki. He spent the following campaign at Astra Krotoszyn, before joining Heko Czermno in 2002. From 2003 to his retirement in 2008, he represented Victoria Częstochowa.

== Coaching career ==
Between 2009 and 2010, Synoradzki was the coach of LKS Kamienica Polska. He was promoted to fifth league with this club. In December 2010 he signed with Znicz Kłobuck. In October 2011, he was appointed as the coach of Unia Rędziny. In May 2013, he became a coach of Orły Kusięta. He resigned on 14 March 2016.

== Bibliography ==
- "Sebastian Synoradzki" (in Polish). 90minut.pl.
