= José Damasceno =

Mexican-Brazilian footballer

Personal information
- Full name: José Santos Damasceno Filho
- Date of birth: January 26, 1970 (age 56)
- Place of birth: Salvador, Brazil
- Height: 1.70 m (5 ft 7 in)
- Position: Midfielder

Senior career*
Years	Team	Apps	(Gls)
1992-?	Pumas	?	(?)
1995–1996	Celaya	39	(6)
1996–1999	Atlante	100	(10)
1999–2002	Celaya	93	(11)
2002	Santos Laguna	9	(0)
2002–2005	Jaguares de Chiapas	76	(5)
- * Club domestic league appearances and goals

José Santos Damasceno Filho (born July 13, 1970 in Salvador, Bahia, Brazil), also known as Tiba, is a Mexican-Brazilian footballer.

== Career ==
Born in Salvador, Bahia, Damasceno was signed by Mexican club Pumas UNAM on the recommendation of former Pumas player and native of Salvador, Evanivaldo Castro, during the 1991–92 season. Pumas loaned Damasceno to Celaya F.C. for the 1995–96 season. The following season he was sold to Atlante F.C., where he would have a strong reaction during the first round of the 1996–97 Mexican Primera División season Invierno playoffs against Toros Neza, whose players dyed their hair red and yellow.
