= Daniel Fascioli =

Uruguayan footballer (born 1967)

Daniel Pedro Fascioli Álvarez (born March 3, 1967, in Montevideo, Uruguay) is a Uruguayan former football player. He played for clubs in Uruguay, Chile, México and Ecuador.

== Teams ==
- (Uruguay) Huracán Buceo
- (Ecuador) Deportivo Quito
- (Uruguay) Danubio
- (Chile) Cobreloa
- (Chile) Deportes Antofagasta
- (Mexico) Veracruz
- (Mexico) Correcaminos UAT
- (Mexico) Veracruz
- (Mexico) Correcaminos UAT

== Honours ==
- Deportes Antofagasta 1996 (2º Top Scorer Copa Chile)
