= José Luis Castillo (activist) =

Colombian-American activist (born 1968)

José Luis Castillo (born April 19, 1968, in Den Haag, Netherlands) is a Colombian American activist, politician, and nonprofit community liaison in South Florida. He is the founder of the Colombian American Foundation in Miami and the Pan American Coalition an umbrella organization comprised of 14 groups representing an array of immigrants from Central America and the Caribbean and is active in the community fighting for the rights and liberties of his fellow Colombian Americans. He has been awarded the title of "Gran Caballero" con la Orden de la Democracia Simón Bolívar from Colombia.

== Early years ==
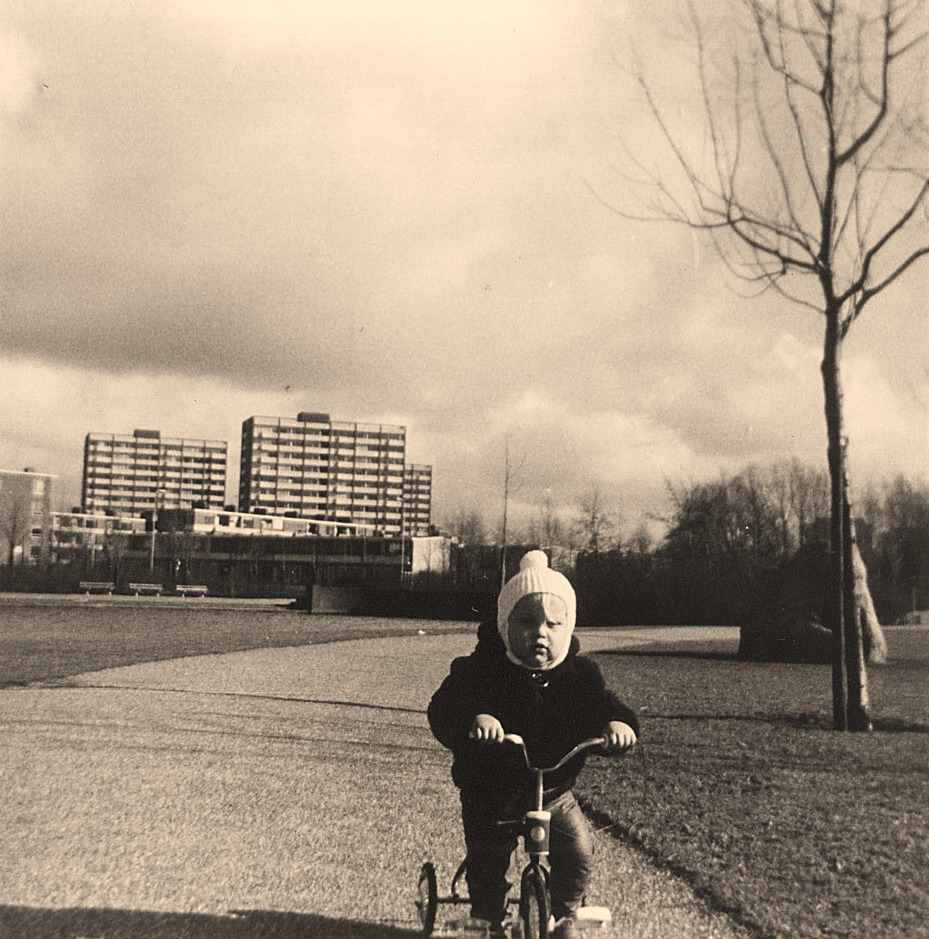
José Luis in the Netherlands in the early 1970s

Castillo was born to a Dutch mother, Yvonne Alexandra Eggermont, and a Colombian father, Luis Alfonso Castillo Castañeda, in the Netherlands, where he lived until the age of four. In 1972, his family moved to Alicante, Spain, then moved back to the Netherlands before coming to Popayán, Colombia, a beautiful colonial city listed on the national registry, especially for its religious and cultural influences. As a kid, Castillo studied at the Instituto de Melvin Jones while his father was a professor of music at Universidad de Cauca. In 1975, they moved to Cali, Colombia, in the valley beneath Popayán. There, Castillo enrolled in the prestigious Colegio Aleman at the age of six. Already fluent in Dutch and Spanish, he began studies in the German language.

In 1979, at the age of 11, Castillo moved to Miami, Florida. There, he attended Henry M. Flagler Elementary and Kinloch Park Middle School, where he learned to speak English. Later, he moved back to Cali and received his diploma from Santa Librada Bachillerato. Castillo completed his education back in the states by receiving a bachelor's degree (B.A.) in History and a master's degree (M.A.) in Public Administration from St. Thomas University.

== Professional Years ==
In 1999, Castillo began a long history of dedication to non-profit charitable organizations. While working with the Cystic Fibrosis Foundation, he helped to organize the Kayak Challenge, which raised funds to benefit the foundation. In 2002, he was the district director for the Muscular Dystrophy Association and also acted as development director and grant-writer for the American Cancer Society.

In 2000, Castillo ran for a Miami-Dade County District 11 commission seat as "the candidate with the most public officials in his corner." He ran on a platform of battling corruption in politics - "Corruption not only breaks the public's trust in government, it discourages new businesses from relocating to our area and affects tourism, which are primary sources of revenue." In 2002, he ran for the state House seat for District 116, wanting to improve the quality of life for residents of Kendall - "There needs to be a refocus on how the state is handling the allocation of funds and additional programs needed in the public school system." Castillo also ran for the Southwest Miami-Dade County District 7 School Board in 2004 and later headed the "successful campaign for Colombian-American West Kendall community councilwoman Beatriz Suarez."

Castillo has continually been active in bringing change to his community, first as a member of Concerned Citizens of West Dade, then as founder and president of Concerned Citizens of Kendall. He has been especially vocal in his support for issues relating to fellow Colombian-Americans here and Colombian citizens still in their homeland. As co-founder and president of the Pan American Coalition he helped organize the effort through Congress to petition President Clinton for "special legal protection for thousands of Colombians who have fled the troubled country in recent years. Their petition specifically asks for a classification known as temporary protective status that would allow between 60,000 and 80,000 Colombians to live and work in the country legally for up to 18 months." Through the coalition Castillo also helped organize a rally at Homestead park in Miami demanding amnesty for undocumented immigrants "seeking the right to legally live and work in the United States. He stated, "We feel the time is right for amnesty and for these immigrants who have led productive lives to become a legal part of the workforce."

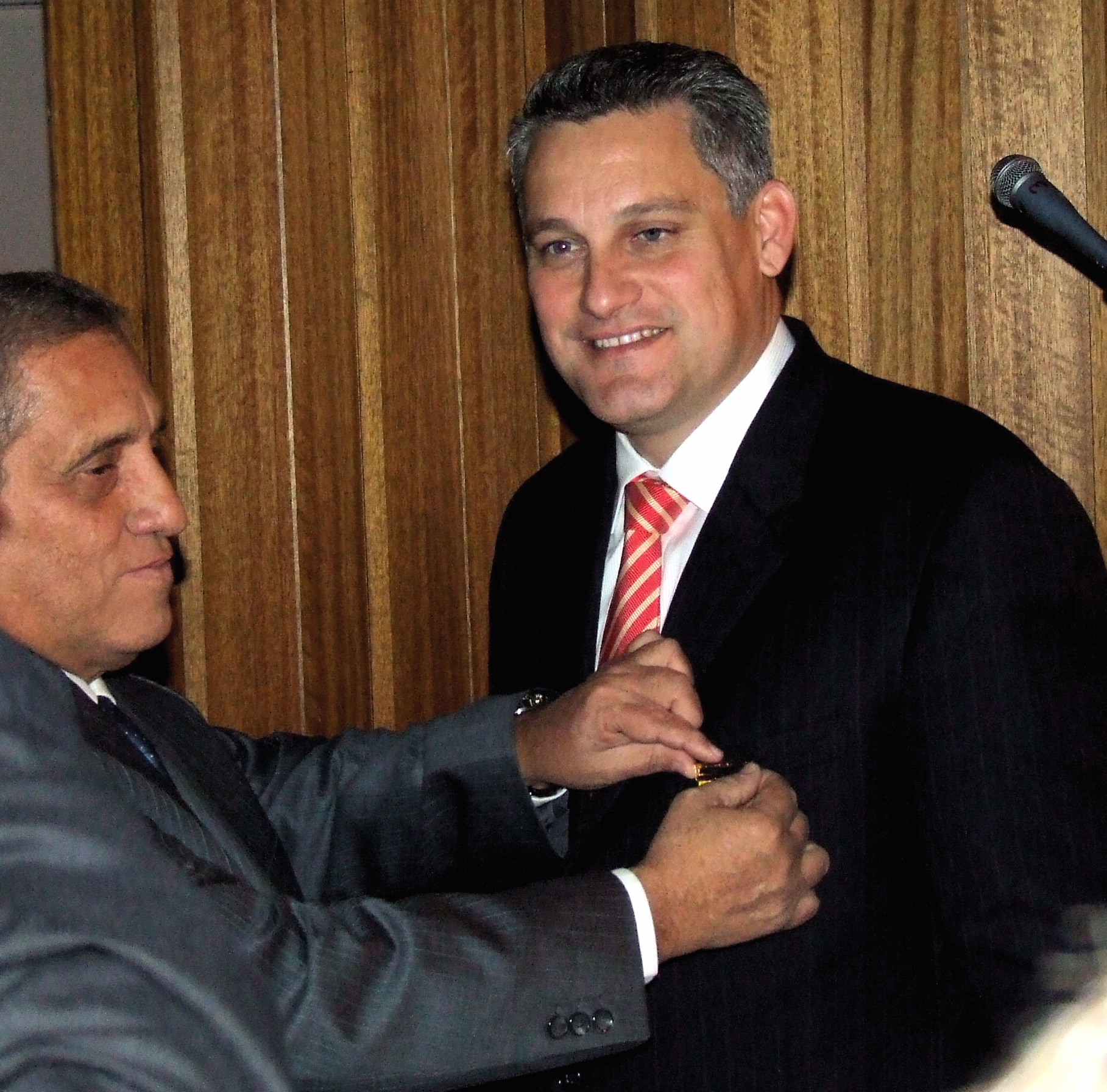
Gran Caballero

In 2001, Castillo founded the Colombian American Foundation and continued fighting for Colombian rights, specifically for females seeking political asylum who were being held at a local jail - "Prisons and jails," Castillo said, referring to the county-run building, which were created to punish or reform criminals. "But these women have not committed a crime, they escaped a terrible political war going on in Colombia," he said. In 2008 Castillo helped organize a march in South Florida protesting the Colombian guerilla army known as the FARCRevolutionary Armed Forces of Colombia - "With this march we want to bring world attention to the fact that Colombia is under a terrorist threat."

On January 15, 2008, Castillo was recognized for his work in the Colombian community by the Colombian government and awarded the title of "Gran Caballero" (grand gentlemen) by the order of the Simón Bolívar democracy at the Colombian consulate in Coral Gables, Florida.

Castillo has three siblings and is married with three daughters and one son.
