= Carlos López (footballer, born 1970) =

Mexican footballer (born 1970)

Personal information
- Full name: Carlos López de Silanes Molina
- Date of birth: 18 April 1970 (age 56)
- Place of birth: Mexico City, Mexico
- Height: 1.82 m (6 ft 0 in)
- Position: Defender

Senior career*
Years	Team	Apps	(Gls)
1990 – 1995	Necaxa	91	(2)
1995 – 1996	Guadalajara	1	(0)
1996 – 1997	Celaya	22	(2)
1997 – 1998	León	22	(1)
1998 – 1999	Irapuato	13	(1)
1999 – 2000	Lobos BUAP	26	(3)
2000 – 2001	Chester City	2	(0)
2001 – 2002	Wycombe Wanderers	1	(0)
2003	Atlético Yucatán	16	(0)

International career
1991 – 1992	Mexico U23	6	(0)

Managerial career
- 2006: Zacatepec (assistant)
- 2007: Socio Águila (assistant)
- 2008: Tecos (assistant)
- 2013: América Reserves and Academy
- 2022: Cruz Azul (assistant)
- * Club domestic league appearances and goals as of 19-07-10

Carlos López de Silanes (born April 18, 1970) is a Mexican former footballer who played as a defender. He was a member of the Mexico national football team competing at the 1992 Summer Olympics in Barcelona, Spain. He had a brief spell in English football, making 2 substitute appearances for Chester City in the Football Conference, and a single appearance for Wycombe Wanderers in The Football League.
