= José Antonio Castillo =

Spanish footballer

Personal information
- Full name: José Antonio Castillo Barragán
- Date of birth: 17 February 1970 (age 56)
- Place of birth: Granada, Spain
- Height: 1.70 m (5 ft 7 in)
- Position: Midfielder

Youth career
- Málaga

Senior career*
Years	Team	Apps	(Gls)
1988–1990	Atlético Malagueño		
1990–1992	Málaga	44	(1)
1992–1994	Valladolid	45	(2)
1994–1995	Chaves	12	(0)
1995–1996	Almería	16	(0)
1996–1997	Marbella	16	(0)
1997–1998	Motril	21	(1)
Total		154	(4)

International career
1991	Spain U23	1	(0)
- * Club domestic league appearances and goals

José Antonio Castillo Barragán (born 17 February 1970 in Granada, Andalusia) is a Spanish retired footballer who played as a midfielder.
