= Alberto Guerra (footballer) =

Mexican footballer and manager (born 1944)

Personal information
- Full name: Alberto Guerra López
- Date of birth: 8 May 1944 (age 82)
- Place of birth: Ciudad Juárez, Chihuahua, Mexico
- Position: Defensive midfielder

Senior career*
Years	Team	Apps	(Gls)
1964–1968	C.D. Guadalajara	?	(?)
1969–1973	C.F. Monterrey	?	(?)
1974–1976	Atlético Potosí	?	(?)

Managerial career
- 1979–1980: Atlético Potosí
- 1981–1987: C.D. Guadalajara
- 1988: Mexico
- 1989–1992: Leones Negros de la U. de G.
- 1992–1993: Tecos UAG
- 1993–1995: C.D. Guadalajara
- 1995–1996: Toros Neza
- 1996–1997: Tigres UANL
- 1998: Club León
- 1999: Toros Neza
- 2001: C.F. La Piedad
- 2003: Tecos UAG
- * Club domestic league appearances and goals

Alberto Guerra López (born 8 May 1944) is a Mexican former football player and manager. He played for Guadalajara throughout his career.

== Playing career ==
When Guerra was five, his parents decided to move to the city of Guadalajara, Jalisco, where he joined the youth ranks of Club Deportivo Guadalajara and also played for the Selección Jalisco youth team.

He made his debut on August 23, 1964, at the age of 20, in a match against Club Atlas in Guadalajara. Later in 1969 joined C.F. Monterrey and then in 1975 he joined Atlético Potosí, where he finished his career in 1976.

== Management career ==
Upon retiring, Guerra becomes head coach of Atlético Potosí, starting off with the youth reserves and eventually going to lead the first team in the 1979–1980 season. After San Luis, Guerra coached Club Deportivo Guadalajara twice, with whom he crowned in the 1986–1987 season and two runners-up runs in 1982-1983 and 1983–1984. In 1990, Guerra won the Copa México with Leones Negros de la U. de G. defeating Club América, in the same season he reaches the final, but loses against the Puebla F.C. of Manuel Lapuente, with an aggregate score of 6–3. After winning back to back championships in the Primera "A" with Tigres de la UANL during the Torneo Invierno 96 and Verano 97, Guerra reaches promotion to the Primera División de México for the tournament of Invierno '98.

=== Mexico ===
Alberto Guerra coached the Selección de fútbol de México (Mexico national football team) for three games in 1988, winning all three matches, but ultimately left the coaching position because he did not agree on the special interests in the Mexican Football Federation, and how economic interests always came before sport.

Event	Date	Local	Score	Visitor
Copa Amistad 1989	February 23, 1989	El Salvador	0-2	Mexico
Copa Amistad 1989	February 21, 1989	Guatemala	1-2	Mexico
Friendly Match	February 14, 1989	Mexico	3-1	Poland

== Honours ==
=== Manager ===
Guadalajara

- Mexican Primera División: 1986-1987

Leones Negros de la U. de G.

- Copa México: 1990

Tigres UANL

- Primera "A": Invierno 1996, Verano 1997

== Personal ==
He is married to former Mexican model Gloria Vázquez. He has a daughter named Ely Guerra.
