= Isaac Ayipei =

Ghanaian footballer

Personal information
- Place of birth: Ghana
- Position: Forward

Senior career*
Years	Team	Apps	(Gls)
1988–1991	Berekum Arsenal		
1991–1992	Leones Negros UdeG	15	(2)
1992–1995	León	101	(35)
1995–1996	Veracruz	17	(4)
1996–1998	Rubin Kazan		
1998–1999	La Piedad		
Total		133	(41)
- * Club domestic league appearances and goals

Isaac Ayipei is a Ghanaian former professional footballer who played as a forward. He during his career played for teams like Berekum Arsenal, Leones Negros UdeG, León, Veracruz, Rubin Kazan and La Piedad.

== Career ==
Born in Ghana, Ayipei began his career with Berekum Arsenal in 1988.

Three years later, at the age of 26, he joined Mexican club Leones Negros UdeG, He became the African footballer to play for a Mexican First Division team in almost 40 years after Moroccan Abdul Abzarrak played for Puebla in 1952. In the 1991–92 season he scored two goals while Leones Negros finished second to last.

In 1992, Ayipei signed for León.

On 14 March 1993, in a match against Monterrey, a strong shot from Ayipei knocked Monterrey goalkeeper Rubén Ruiz Díaz unconscious. Ruiz Díaz regained consciousness after six hours in hospital. Initial reports had indicated that the goalkeeper had suffered a broken jaw but that was corrected. In the 1992–93 season, Ayipei scored 17 goals helping Leon achieve second place. During his time with the club, he scored 35 goals.

Ayipei left Leon to join Veracruz in 1995. From 1996 to 1998 he played for Russian side Rubin Kazan. He returned to Mexico with La Piedad, retiring from playing after the 1998–99 season.

== Style of play ==
A forward, Ayipey was noted for his physical strength and a strong shot.
