= Hugo Santana =

Mexican footballer and manager (born 1967)

Personal information
- Full name: Hugo Santana Páez
- Date of birth: 5 September 1967 (age 59)
- Place of birth: Mexico City, Mexico
- Height: 1.81 m (5 ft 11 1/2 in)
- Position: Midfielder

Team information
- Current team: Arietes F.C. (Manager)

Senior career*
Years	Team	Apps	(Gls)
1996–1997	Atlético Celaya	11	(2)
1999	Toluca	2	(0)

Managerial career
- 2005: Atlante Neza (Assistant)
- 2007: Teca Huixquilucan
- 2013: Deportivo Star Club
- 2017: Cruz Azul Reserves and Academy
- 2017–2018: Cruz Azul (Women) (Assistant)
- 2018: Cruz Azul (Women) (Interim)
- 2018–2019: Cruz Azul (Women)
- 2019–2020: Zacatepec (Liga TDP)
- 2021: Héroes de Zaci (Assistant)
- 2022: Cordobés (Assistant)
- 2023–: Arietes
- * Club domestic league appearances and goals

Hugo Santana Páez (born September 5, 1967) is a Mexican football manager and former player.
