= Camilo Romero (footballer) =

Mexican footballer (born 1970)

Personal information
- Full name: Camilo Romero Mora
- Date of birth: 30 March 1970 (age 56)
- Place of birth: Guadalajara, Mexico
- Height: 1.75 m (5 ft 9 in)
- Position: Left-back

Senior career*
| Years | Team | Apps | (Gls) |
| 1990–1991 | Guadalajara | 2 | (0) |
| 1991–1992 | Querétaro | 4 | (0) |
| 1992–1993 | C.D. Guadalajara | 8 | (1) |
| 1993–1994 | Atlético Morelia | 36 | (2) |
| 1994–1998 | Guadalajara | 111 | (3) |
| 1998–1999 | León | 26 | (3) |
| 1999–2000 | Toros Neza | 16 | (3) |
| 1999–2000 | León | 13 | (2) |
| 2000–2001 | Pachuca | 15 | (1) |
| 2000–2002 | Guadalajara | 12 | (1) |
| 2002–2003 | Puebla | 2 | (0) |
| 2002–2003 | Tabasco | 21 | (2) |
| 2003–2004 | Coatzacoalcos | 31 | (2) |
| 2004–2005 | Tabasco | 36 | (1) |

International career
| 1992 | Mexico U-23 | 1 | (0) |
| 1995–1997 | Mexico | 14 | (0) |

Managerial career
- 2006: Coatzacoalcos (Assistant)
- 2010: Zapotlanejo F.C.
- 2010–2011: Delfines de Los Cabos F.C.
- 2015–2016: Cocula F.C. (Assistant)
- 2017: Real Zamora
- 2018: Venados F.C. (Assistant)
Medal record
Representing Mexico
| Third place | Copa America | 1997 |
- * Club domestic league appearances and goals as of 19-07-10

Camilo Romero (born 30 March 1970) is a Mexican former footballer who played as a left-back.

Romero was a member of the Mexico national football team competing at the 1992 Summer Olympics in Barcelona, Spain. He earned fourteen caps for the national A-side, making his debut on February 1, 1995, in a friendly match against Uruguay (1-0 win) in San Diego.
