= Gustavo Nápoles =

Mexican footballer and manager (born 1973)

Personal information
- Full name: Gustavo Nápoles Monteon
- Date of birth: May 11, 1973 (age 53)
- Place of birth: San Nicolás de los Garza, Nuevo León, Mexico
- Height: 1.80 m (5 ft 11 in)
- Positions: Attacking midfielder; forward

Senior career*
Years	Team	Apps	(Gls)
1991–1995	Tigres	100	(18)
1995–1998	Guadalajara	128	(43)
1998–1999	Atlante F.C.	17	(7)
1999	América	10	(0)
1999	Celaya	17	(5)
2000	Atlante F.C.	15	(5)
2000–2002	Guadalajara	65	(8)
2002–2003	Jaguares	33	(1)
2003	León	7	(0)
2004	Puebla	7	(0)
2005	Espoli	8	(2)
2007	Tigres B	15	(1)

International career^{‡}
1993	Mexico	3	(0)
- * Club domestic league appearances and goals as of 6 March 2007 ‡ National team caps and goals as of 6 March 2007

Gustavo Nápoles (born May 11, 1973), is a Mexican former football player and manager who played as an attacking midfielder and striker, and was most recently an assistant manager at Coras de Tepic.

Nicknamed "El Gusano" ("The Worm") for the way he celebrated his goals, he began his career with Tigres, debuting against Santos Laguna on November 16, 1991. He played with his hometown team until 1995 when his contract was bought by Mexico's most famous team, Guadalajara. He gained most of his popularity playing for "El Rebaño Sagrado", and was part of the Championship winning team for the Verano 1997 Tournament. "El Gusano"'s left Guadalajara after the Verano 1998 Tournament, and he was traded to Atlante F.C., where he stayed for a year before being traded to América for the Verano 1999 season. His next move was to the relegated team Celaya for the Invierno 1999 season, after which he returned to Atlante F.C. for the Verano 2000 season. The 2000–2001 season saw his return to Guadalajara two more years, before moving to Jaguares. He soon moved to the relegated team Club Puebla in the 2003–2004 season, and later Ecuadorian club Espoli in 2005, before retiring at Tigres B in 2007.

== Honours ==
Mexico

- Pan American Games Silver Medal: 1995
