= List of Mexico international footballers =

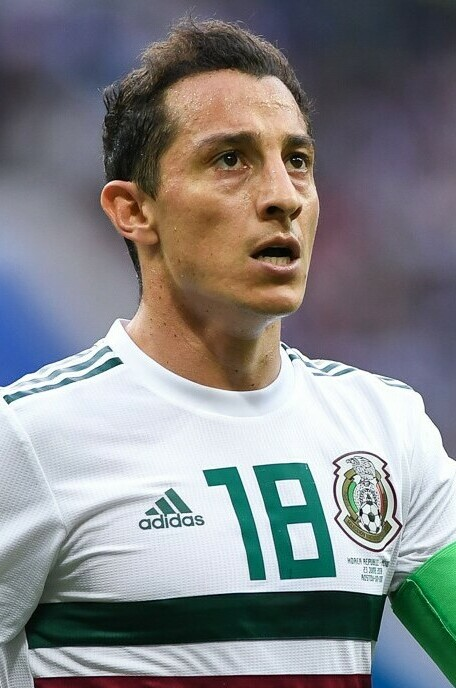
Andrés Guardado is Mexico's most capped international of all time with 181 caps.

The Mexico national football team has represented Mexico in men's international football since 1923, when they played their first international, a 3–2 win over Guatemala. The team is organized by the Mexican Football Federation, a member of FIFA and a founding member of CONCACAF. They competed in the first World Cup, and have reached the quarter-final stage of the tournament twice, in 1970 and 1986, and are 12-time champions of the CONCACAF Championship and its successor, the Gold Cup.

This list includes all players who have represented the Mexico national team in at least 30 matches.

== Players ==
As of match played 27 September 2026

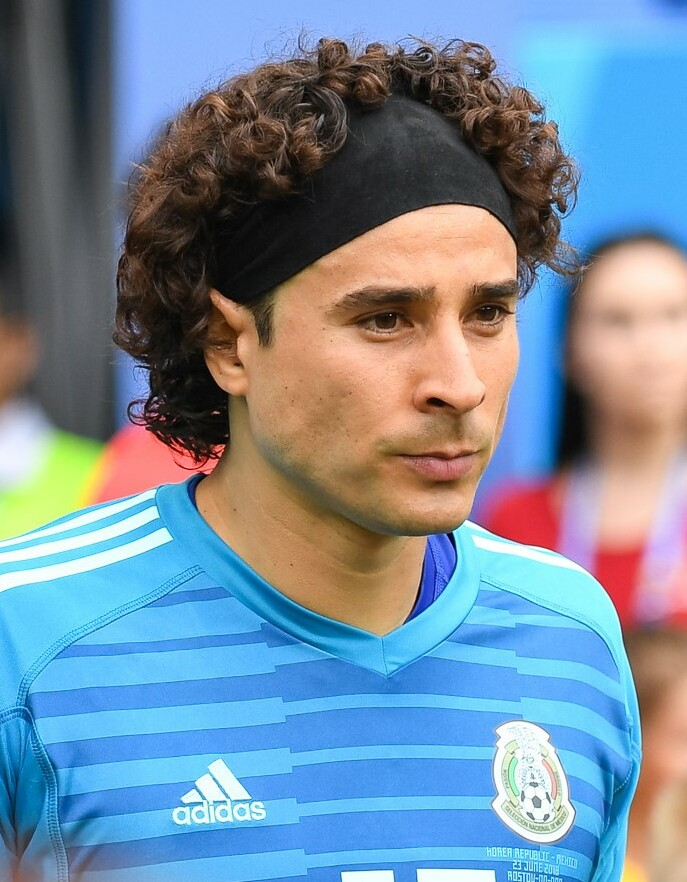
Guillermo Ochoa has made 153 appearances for the Mexico national team.

Key
**Bold**	Played for the national team in the past year

Mexico national team footballers with at least 30 appearances
No.	Name	National career	Caps	Goals
1	Andrés Guardado	2005–2022	181	28
2	Claudio Suárez	1992–2006	178	6
3	Guillermo Ochoa	2005–2026	153	0
4	Rafael Márquez	1997–2018	147	17
4	Pável Pardo	1996–2009	147	11
6	Gerardo Torrado	1999–2013	146	6
7	**Héctor Moreno**	2007–	132	5
8	Jorge Campos	1991–2003	130	0
9	**Raúl Jiménez**	2013–	128	48
10	**Jesús Gallardo**	2016–	127	3
11	Carlos Salcido	2004–2014	124	9
12	Ramón Ramírez	1991–2000	121	15
13	Cuauhtémoc Blanco	1995–2014	120	39
14	Alberto García Aspe	1988–2002	110	21
15	Javier Hernández	2009–2019	109	52
16	Maza Rodríguez	2004–2015	108	1
17	Giovani dos Santos	2007–2018	107	19
18	**Héctor Herrera**	2012–	105	10
19	**Edson Álvarez**	2017–	102	7
20	Oswaldo Sánchez	1996–2011	99	0
21	**Orbelín Pineda**	2016–	95	2
22	Carlos Hermosillo	1984–1997	90	35
23	Jared Borgetti	1997–2008	89	46
24	Luis Hernández	1995–2002	85	35
25	Luís Roberto Alves	1988–2001	84	30
25	Salvador Carmona	1996–2005	84	0
25	Duilio Davino	1996–2006	84	2
28	Gustavo Peña	1961–1974	82	3
28	Ricardo Osorio	2003–2011	82	1
30	Miguel España	1984–1994	81	2
31	Francisco Palencia	1996–2009	79	12
32	Luis García	1991–1999	77	29
33	**Hirving Lozano**	2016–	76	18
34	**Roberto Alvarado**	2018–	73	5
35	Miguel Layún	2013–2020	72	6
35	Carlos Vela	2007–2018	72	19
37	Jesús Manuel Corona	2014–2022	71	9
37	**César Montes**	2017–	71	4
39	Jesús Arellano	1996–2006	70	7
40	Luis Ernesto Pérez	1998–2012	69	8
41	Isidoro Diaz	1960–1970	68	16
42	**Néstor Araujo**	2011–	67	3
42	Omar Bravo	2003–2013	67	15
42	Oribe Peralta	2005–2018	67	25
42	**Carlos Rodríguez**	2019–2026	67	0
42	**Luis Romo**	2019–	67	5
47	Germán Villa	1996–2002	66	0
48	Marcelino Bernal	1988–1998	65	5
48	Enrique Borja	1966–1975	65	31
48	Benjamín Galindo	1983–1997	65	28
48	Diego Reyes	2011–2019	65	2
52	Ignacio Ambriz	1992–1995	64	6
52	Uriel Antuna	2019–2024	64	14
52	**Jorge Sánchez**	2019–	64	3
55	Luis Flores	1983–1993	62	29
56	Ignacio Calderón	1965–1974	60	0
57	Javier Aguirre	1983–1992	59	13
57	Daniel Osorno	1999–2006	59	13
59	Jonathan dos Santos	2009–2021	58	5
59	Sinha	2004–2012	58	7
59	Mario Pérez	1967–1972	58	1
62	Ramón Morales	2000–2007	57	5
62	Manuel Negrete	1981–1990	57	12
64	Pablo Barrera	2007–2013	56	6
64	Carlos Muñoz	1983–1991	56	2
64	Alberto Medina	2003–2010	56	5
67	Paul Nicolás Aguilar	2009–2016	55	5
67	Guillermo Hernández	1966–1973	55	2
67	Aarón Padilla	1965–1970	55	8
67	Óscar Pérez	1997–2010	55	0
67	Hugo Sánchez	1977–1998	55	27
67	Arturo Vázquez	1973–1980	55	5
73	Javier Aquino	2011–2018	54	5
73	Alberto Coyote	1992–2000	54	0
73	Jonny Magallón	2007–2010	54	3
76	José de Jesús Corona	2005–2018	53	0
76	Mario Trejo	1980–1986	53	1
76	**Alexis Vega**	2019–	53	7
79	Tomás Boy	1979–1986	52	9
79	Rafael García	1996–2006	52	3
79	Javier Sánchez	1968–1977	52	0
82	Felix Cruz	1983–1991	51	1
82	**Santiago Giménez**	2021–	51	4
82	Joaquín del Olmo	1993–2000	51	3
82	**Johan Vásquez**	2019–	51	3
86	Horacio López Salgado	1968–1980	50	13
87	Juan de Dios Ramírez	1991–1995	49	0
87	Salvador Reyes	1956–1966	49	14
87	Jorge Torres Nilo	2008–2016	49	1
87	Miguel Zepeda	1999–2005	49	8
91	Pablo Larios	1983–1991	48	0
91	Carlos Salcedo	2015–2021	48	1
93	Fernando Arce	2003–2013	47	7
93	Hugo Ayala	2009–2018	47	1
93	Antonio Carbajal	1950–1966	47	0
93	**Luis Chávez**	2023–	47	5
93	Javier Fragoso	1965–1970	47	19
98	Henry Martín	2015–2024	46	11
99	José Manuel Abundis	1996–2001	45	9
99	Israel Castro	2007–2012	45	1
99	Fernando Quirarte	1981–1988	45	5
102	Antonio de la Torre	1972–1978	44	1
102	Antonio Munguía	1967–1971	44	0
102	Gonzalo Pineda	2004–2008	44	1
105	Marco Fabián	2011–2018	43	9
105	Francisco Fonseca	2004–2008	43	21
105	Ricardo Peláez	1989–1999	43	16
105	Héctor Pulido	1967–1973	43	6
105	Juan Pablo Rodríguez	2000–2006	43	1
110	Missael Espinosa	1990–1995	41	4
110	José Luis González Dávila	1965–1970	41	4
112	Leonardo Cuéllar	1973–1981	40	3
112	Jesús del Muro	1958–1968	40	0
112	Jorge Rodríguez	1991–1996	40	3
112	Alfredo Talavera	2011–2022	40	0
116	Fernando Bustos	1967–1973	39	11
116	Raúl Lara	1996–2000	39	0
116	**Israel Reyes**	2021–	39	2
119	Adolfo Bautista	2002–2010	38	10
119	Ernesto Cisneros	1965–1970	38	13
119	Javier Guzmán	1970-1977	38	3
119	Efraín Juárez	2009–2012	38	1
119	Rodolfo Pizarro	2014–2022	38	5
119	Eduardo Ramos	1971–1978	38	0
119	Luis Rodríguez	2015–2022	38	2
119	**Érick Sánchez**	2021–	38	3
127	Raúl Cárdenas	1948–1962	37	3
127	Raúl Gutiérrez	1991–1996	37	0
127	Juan Hernández	1987–1993	37	2
130	**Érick Gutiérrez**	2016–	36	1
130	Armando Manzo	1980–1986	36	0
132	Javier Hernández	1983–1994	35	7
132	Gabriel Núñez	1965–1971	35	0
132	Raúl Servín	1985–1990	35	4
135	José Antonio Castro	2003–2010	34	1
135	Mario Méndez	2003–2008	34	0
135	Manuel Vidrio	2001–2002	34	1
138	**Diego Lainez**	2018–	33	3
139	Ignacio Jáuregui	1959–1967	32	1
139	Jaime Lozano	2003–2008	32	12
139	Braulio Luna	1997–2010	32	2
139	Jesús Molina	2010–2018	32	1
143	Alfredo del Águila	1956–1967	31	2
143	Adolfo Ríos	1988–1999	31	0
143	Joel Sánchez	1996–1999	31	3
143	José Vantolrá	1963–1970	31	0
143	Jesús Zavala	2011–2016	31	2
148	Rafael Amador	1983–1986	30	0
148	**Érik Lira**	2021–	30	0
148	Alfredo Tena	1977–1990	30	0
148	Octavio Valdez	2001–2004	30	0
