= 1985 Azteca 2000 Tournament =

Tournament details
- Host country: Mexico
- Dates: 9 – 15 June 1985
- Teams: 3 (from 2 confederations)
- Venue: 1 (in 1 host city)

Final positions
- Champions: Mexico
- Runners-up: England
- Third place: West Germany

Tournament statistics
- Matches played: 3
- Goals scored: 6 (2 per match)
- Top scorer(s): Kerry Dixon (2 goals)

The Azteca 2000 Tournament was a minor international football competition, which took place in the summer of 1985 in Mexico City.

Host nation Mexico, England and West Germany participated in the tournament, and matches took place at the Estadio Azteca. The three-nation mini-tournament was arranged as a preparatory exercise for Mexico, who would host the 1986 FIFA World Cup final tournament the following year.

The first game of this tournament (England vs Mexico) was also the final game of the Mexico City Cup Tournament.

== Background ==
The Azteca 2000 was the second on an overlapping tournament following on from Ciudad de México Cup. England having qualified for the 1986 FIFA World Cup after winning their group were invited to participate in the tournament. England manager Bobby Robson considered this a good chance to climatise his squad before the world cup. The team he brought with him included Gary Lineker, Trevor Francis, Glenn Hoddle, Bryan Robson, John Barnes and Peter Shilton.

== Results ==
=== Mexico vs England ===
Note: This match also counted as the last match of the 1985 Ciudad de México Cup Tournament.

9 June 1985
12:00 CST

Mexico	1–0	England
Flores 19'	Report

Estadio Azteca, Mexico City
Attendance: 15,000
Referee: Volker Roth (West Germany)

Mexico	England

GK	1	Pablo Larios
DF	2	Mario Trejo
DF	14	Félix Cruz
DF	3	Fernando Quirarte
DF	18	Rafael Amador
MF	16	Carlos Muñoz
MF	7	Miguel España	(substituted off) 85'
MF	22	Manuel Negrete
MF	10	Tomás Boy (c)	(substituted off) 60'
MF	13	Javier Aguirre
FW	15	Luis Flores	(substituted off) 58'
Substitutions:
MF	19	Carlos Hermosillo	(substituted on) 58'
FW	8	Alejandro Domínguez	(substituted on) 60'
FW	6	Carlos de los Cobos	(substituted on) 85'
Manager:
(Socialist Federal Republic of Yugoslavia) Bora Milutinović

GK	1	Gary Bailey
DF	2	Viv Anderson
DF	3	Kenny Sansom
DF	5	Terry Fenwick
DF	6	David Watson
MF	4	Glenn Hoddle	(substituted off) 80'
MF	7	Bryan Robson (c)
MF	8	Ray Wilkins	(substituted off) 70'
FW	15	John Barnes	(substituted off) 70'
FW	10	Trevor Francis
FW	9	Mark Hateley
Substitutions:
MF	18	Chris Waddle	(substituted on) 70'
MF	16	Peter Reid	(substituted on) 70'
FW	19	Kerry Dixon	(substituted on) 80'
Manager:
Bobby Robson

=== England vs West Germany ===
12 June 1985
14:00 CST

England	3–0	West Germany
Robson 35'; Dixon 54', 67'	Report

Estadio Azteca, Mexico City
Attendance: 10,000
Referee: Jorge Leanza Sansone (Mexico)

England	West Germany

GK	1	Peter Shilton
DF	6	Terry Butcher
DF	3	Kenny Sansom
DF	2	Gary Stevens
DF	5	Mark Wright
MF	4	Glenn Hoddle (c)
MF	8	Peter Reid
MF	7	Bryan Robson	(substituted off) 72'
MF	11	Chris Waddle
FW	9	Kerry Dixon
FW	10	Gary Lineker	(substituted off) 60'
Substitutions:
FW	15	John Barnes	(substituted on) 60'
MF	17	Paul Bracewell	(substituted on) 72'
Manager:
Bobby Robson

GK	1	Harald Schumacher (c)
DF	6	Klaus Augenthaler
DF	2	Thomas Berthold
DF	3	Andreas Brehme
DF	5	Matthias Herget
DF	4	Ditmar Jakobs
MF	7	Pierre Littbarski	(substituted off) 73'
MF	10	Felix Magath	(substituted off) 60'
MF	8	Lothar Matthäus
FW	9	Frank Mill
FW	11	Uwe Rahn
Substitutions:
MF	14	Olaf Thon	(substituted on) 60'
FW	15	Herbert Waas	(substituted on) 73'
Manager:
Franz Beckenbauer

=== Mexico vs West Germany ===
15 June 1985
12:15 CST

Mexico	2–0	West Germany
Negrete 6'; Flores 46'	Report

Estadio Azteca, Mexico City
Attendance: 25,000
Referee: Keith Hackett (England)

Mexico	West Germany

GK	20	Olaf Heredia
DF	18	Rafael Amador
DF	14	Félix Cruz
DF	3	Fernando Quirarte
DF	2	Mario Trejo
MF	13	Javier Aguirre
MF	10	Tomás Boy (c)	(substituted off) 78'
MF	6	Carlos de los Cobos
MF	7	Miguel España
MF	22	Manuel Negrete	(substituted off) 70'
FW	15	Luis Flores
Substitutions:
MF	8	Alejandro Domínguez	(substituted on) 70'
FW	19	Carlos Hermosillo	(substituted on) 78'
Manager:
(Socialist Federal Republic of Yugoslavia) Bora Milutinović

GK	1	Uli Stein
DF	6	Klaus Augenthaler	(substituted off) 65'
DF	3	Andreas Brehme
DF	5	Matthias Herget
DF	4	Ditmar Jakobs
MF	10	Felix Magath (c)
MF	2	Lothar Matthäus
MF	7	Ludwig Kögl
FW	11	Frank Mill
FW	8	Uwe Rahn
FW	9	Rudi Völler
Substitutions:
DF	14	Michael Frontzeck	(substituted on) 65'
Manager:
Franz Beckenbauer

== Table ==
	Team	Pld	W	D	L	GF	GA	GD	Pts
1	Mexico	2	2	0	0	3	0	+3	4
2	England	2	1	0	1	3	1	+2	2
3	West Germany	2	0	0	2	0	5	−5	0
