= 1985 Ciudad de México Cup Tournament =

International football competition

1985 Mexico City Cup Tournament

Tournament details
- Host country: Mexico
- Dates: 2 – 9 June 1985
- Teams: 3
- Venue: 1 (in 1 host city)

Final positions
- Champions: Italy
- Runners-up: Mexico
- Third place: England

Tournament statistics
- Matches played: 3
- Goals scored: 6 (2 per match)
- Top scorer(s): Six players (1 goal each)

The Ciudad de México Cup Tournament was a minor international football competition, which took place in the summer of 1985 in Mexico City.

Host nation Mexico, England and Italy participated in the tournament, with Italy winning. All matches took place at the Estadio Azteca, home of Mexico City-based clubs América, Cruz Azul and Necaxa. The three-nation mini-tournament was arranged as a preparatory exercise for Mexico, who would host the World Cup tournament the following year.

The final game of this tournament also served as the first game of the 1985 Azteca 2000 Tournament.

== Results ==
=== Mexico vs Italy ===
2 June 1985
12:00 CST

Mexico	1–1	Italy
Aguirre 45'	Report	di Gennaro 54'

Estadio Azteca, Mexico City
Attendance: 35,000
Referee: John B. Meachin (Canada)

Mexico	Italy

GK	1	Pablo Larios
DF	18	Rafael Amador	(substituted off) 46'
DF	5	Francisco Chávez
DF	14	Félix Cruz
DF	4	Armando Manzo
MF	13	Javier Aguirre	(substituted off) 86'
MF	10	Tomás Boy (c)	(substituted off) 75'
MF	7	Miguel España
MF	16	Carlos Muñoz
MF	22	Manuel Negrete
FW	15	Luis Flores	(substituted off) 46'
Substitutions:
MF/FW	11	Javier Hernández	(substituted on) 46'
DF	17	Raúl Servín	(substituted on) 46'
MF	8	Alejandro Domínguez	(substituted on) 75'
MF	6	Carlos de los Cobos	(substituted on) 86'
Manager:
(Socialist Federal Republic of Yugoslavia) Bora Milutinović

GK	1	Ivano Bordon	(substituted off) 46'
RB	2	Giuseppe Bergomi
CB	3	Fulvio Collovati (c)
CB	6	Roberto Tricella
LB	5	Ubaldo Righetti	(substituted off) 68'
RM	10	Antonio di Gennaro	(substituted off) 79'
CM	4	Giuseppe Baresi
CM	8	Salvatore Bagni
LM	7	Bruno Conti	(substituted off) 64'
RF	9	Bruno Giordano	(substituted off) 46'
LF	11	Alessandro Altobelli	(substituted off) 78'
Substitutions:
GK	12	Giovanni Galli	(substituted on) 46'
LM	13	Giuseppe Dossena	(substituted on) 78'
RM	14	Pietro Fanna	(substituted on) 64'
FW	16	Giuseppe Galderisi	(substituted on) 46'
LB	18	Antonio Cabrini	(substituted on) 68'
CM	19	Marco Tardelli	(substituted on) 79'
Manager:
Enzo Bearzot

=== Italy vs England ===
6 June 1985
14:00 CST

Italy	2–1	England
Bagni 73'; Altobelli 89' (pen.)	Report	Hateley 74'

Estadio Azteca, Mexico City
Attendance: 8,000
Referee: Antonio Márquez Ramírez (Mexico)

Italy	England

GK	1	Giovanni Galli	(substituted off) 46'
RB	2	Giuseppe Bergomi
CB	3	Pietro Vierchowod
CB	5	Fulvio Collovati (c)	(substituted off) 46'
LB	6	Roberto Tricella
RM	10	Antonio di Gennaro
CM	4	Giuseppe Baresi
CM	8	Salvatore Bagni
LM	7	Bruno Conti	(substituted off) 46'
RF	9	Giuseppe Galderisi	(substituted off) 84'
LF	11	Alessandro Altobelli
Substitutions:
GK	12	Franco Tancredi	(substituted on) 46'
LB	13	Antonio Cabrini	(substituted on) 46'
CM	15	Marco Tardelli	(substituted on) 84'
RM	17	Pietro Fanna	(substituted on) 46'
Manager:
Enzo Bearzot

GK	1	Peter Shilton
DF	6	Terry Butcher
DF	3	Kenny Sansom
DF	2	Gary Stevens	(substituted off) 63'
DF	5	Mark Wright
MF	7	Bryan Robson (c)
MF	4	Trevor Steven
MF	11	Chris Waddle	(substituted off) 69'
MF	8	Ray Wilkins
FW	10	Trevor Francis	(substituted off) 78'
FW	9	Mark Hateley
Substitutions:
MF	14	Glenn Hoddle	(substituted on) 63'
FW	15	John Barnes	(substituted on) 69'
FW	16	Gary Lineker	(substituted on) 78'
Manager:
Bobby Robson

=== Mexico vs England ===
Note: This match also counted as the first match of the 1985 Azteca 2000 Tournament.

9 June 1985
12:00 CST

Mexico	1–0	England
Flores 19'	Report

Estadio Azteca, Mexico City
Attendance: 15,000
Referee: Volker Roth (West Germany)

Mexico	England

GK	1	Pablo Larios
DF	2	Mario Trejo
DF	14	Félix Cruz
DF	3	Fernando Quirarte
DF	18	Rafael Amador
MF	16	Carlos Muñoz
MF	7	Miguel España	(substituted off) 85'
MF	22	Manuel Negrete
MF	10	Tomás Boy (c)	(substituted off) 60'
MF	13	Javier Aguirre
FW	15	Luis Flores	(substituted off) 58'
Substitutions:
MF	19	Carlos Hermosillo	(substituted on) 58'
FW	8	Alejandro Domínguez	(substituted on) 60'
FW	6	Carlos de los Cobos	(substituted on) 85'
Manager:
(Socialist Federal Republic of Yugoslavia) Bora Milutinović

GK	1	Gary Bailey
DF	2	Viv Anderson
DF	3	Kenny Sansom
DF	5	Terry Fenwick
DF	6	David Watson
MF	4	Glenn Hoddle	(substituted off) 80'
MF	7	Bryan Robson (c)
MF	8	Ray Wilkins	(substituted off) 70'
FW	15	John Barnes	(substituted off) 70'
FW	10	Trevor Francis
FW	9	Mark Hateley
Substitutions:
MF	18	Chris Waddle	(substituted on) 70'
MF	16	Peter Reid	(substituted on) 70'
FW	19	Kerry Dixon	(substituted on) 80'
Manager:
Bobby Robson

== Table ==
	Team	Pld	W	D	L	GF	GA	GD	Pts
1	Italy	2	1	1	0	3	2	+1	3
2	Mexico	2	1	1	0	2	1	+1	3
3	England	2	0	0	2	1	3	-2	0

Despite having the same number of points and the same goal difference as Mexico, Italy won the tournament as they had scored one more goal.

== Winners ==
1985 Ciudad de México Cup Tournament winners

Italy
First title

== Statistics ==
=== Goalscorers ===
There were 6 goals scored in 3 matches, for an average of 2 goals per match.

1 goal

- (Italy) Alessandro Altobelli
- (Italy) Antonio Di Gennaro
- (Italy) Salvatore Bagni
- (England) Mark Hateley
- (Mexico) Javier Aguirre
- (Mexico) Luis Flores
