= England national football team all-time record =

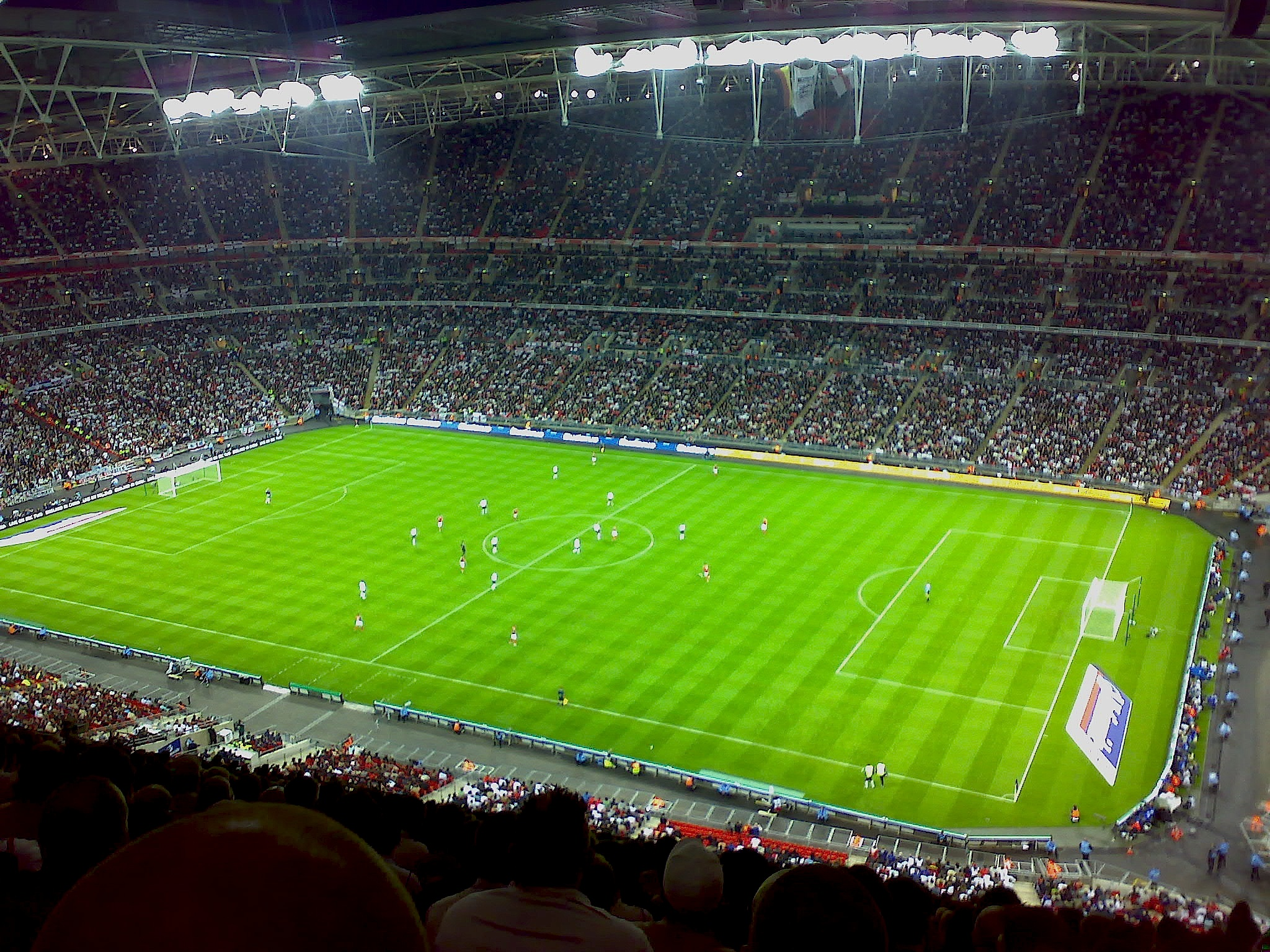
Friendly match between England and Germany at Wembley Stadium in 2007.

The following tables show the England national football team's all-time international record. The statistics are composed of FIFA World Cup, UEFA European Football Championship, UEFA Nations League and British Home Championship (1883–1984) matches, as well as numerous international friendly tournaments and matches. (Note: The list does not include matches contested at the Olympic Games. This is because England is a constituent country of the United Kingdom, and is not a member of the International Olympic Committee. Therefore, the national team does not compete in the Olympics. Instead, see the Great Britain Olympic football team.)

England played the world's first international fixture against Scotland on 30 November 1872, which ended in a 0–0 draw. England and Scotland have since contested 116 official matches: England have won 49, Scotland have won 41 and 26 have been drawn.

England have contested matches against more than 80 national teams. England are unbeaten against 54 of them, having earned a perfect winning percentage against 30 of these teams. England have never beaten five teams that they have played at least once: Algeria, Ghana, Honduras, Saudi Arabia and South Korea. England have played all of these teams only once, with the exception of Saudi Arabia and Ghana (two matches each), and all of their meetings have been draws.

England have a negative record (more losses than wins) against only three countries: Brazil, Italy and Uruguay. England has lost only once against an Asian country. (Note: Matches v Australia, (No. 543 – 31 May 1980), (Match No. 579 – 12 June 1983), (Match No. 580 – 15th June 1983), (Match No. 581 – 19 June 1983), (Match No. 673 – 1st June 1991) and (Match No. 799 – 12 February 2003) Australia was a member of the Oceania Football Confederation and joined the Asia Football Confederation in 2006 and (Match No. 954 – Friday, 27th May 2016) was the first time England played Australia as an AFC member.)

== Performances ==
Last match updated on 15 November 2026

=== Performance by competition ===
Competition	Played	Won	Drawn	Lost	For	Against	Diff	Win %	Loss %
FIFA World Cup	82	38	23	21	124	80	+44	46%	26%
FIFA World Cup qualification	130	92	27	11	336	70	+266	71%	8%
UEFA European Championship	45	18	16	11	59	43	+16	40%	24%
UEFA European Championship qualification	116	79	26	11	280	68	+212	68%	9%
UEFA Nations League	30	15	6	9	53	31	+22	50%	30%
British Home Championship	266	161	56	49	661	270	+391	61%	18%
Competitive (Note: 12 games of the British Home Championship doubled as qualification games for the World Cup and European championship: Matches 250, 251, 252 – 1950 FIFA World Cup qualification and Home Championship; Matches 281, 283, 285 – 1954 FIFA World Cup qualification and Home Championship; Matches 410, 412, 413, 416, 417, 419 – UEFA Euro 68 qualifying and Home Championship; Each game is counted in both applicable lines, but only counts once towards the subtotal.)	688	404	163	121	1513	597	+916	59%	18%
International Friendlies (Note: Matches 277 (v Argentina, 17 May 1953) and 709 (v Republic of Ireland, 15 Feb 1995) were abandoned, hence the number of matches played is greater than the total of wins/draws/losses.)	408	230	94	82	898	452	+446	56%	20%
Minor Tournaments	30	12	9	9	41	32	+9	40%	30%
Total (Note: Minor tournaments are not included in the total.)	1096	634	257	203	2411	1049	+1362	58%	19%

=== Performance by manager ===
Years	Manager	Played	Won	Drawn	Lost	For	Against	Diff	Win %	Loss %
1872–1939	FA Selection Committee	226	138	37	51	674	293	+381	61%	23%
1946–1962	Walter Winterbottom	139	78	32	28	383	196	+187	56%	20%
1963–1974	Alf Ramsey	113	69	27	17	224	98	+126	61%	15%
1974	Joe Mercer	7	3	3	1	9	7	+2	43%	14%
1974–1977	Don Revie	29	14	8	7	49	25	+24	48%	24%
1977–1982	Ron Greenwood	55	33	12	10	93	40	+53	60%	18%
1982–1990	Bobby Robson	95	47	30	18	154	60	+94	49%	19%
1990–1993	Graham Taylor	38	18	13	7	62	32	+30	47%	18%
1994–1996	Terry Venables	24	11	11	1	35	14	+21	46%	4%
1996–1998	Glenn Hoddle	28	17	6	5	42	13	+29	61%	18%
1999 and 2000	Howard Wilkinson	2	0	1	1	0	2	−2	0%	50%
1999–2000	Kevin Keegan	18	7	7	4	26	15	+11	39%	22%
2000	Peter Taylor	1	0	0	1	0	1	−1	0%	100%
2001–2006	Sven-Göran Eriksson	67	40	17	10	128	61	+67	60%	15%
2006–2007	Steve McClaren	18	9	4	5	32	12	+20	50%	28%
2008–2012	Fabio Capello	42	28	8	6	89	35	+54	67%	14%
2012	Stuart Pearce	1	0	0	1	2	3	−1	0%	100%
2012–2016	Roy Hodgson	56	33	15	8	109	44	+65	59%	14%
2016	Sam Allardyce	1	1	0	0	1	0	+1	100%	0%
2016–2024	Gareth Southgate	102	61	24	17	213	72	+141	60%	17%
2024	Lee Carsley	6	5	0	1	16	3	+13	83%	17%
2025–	Thomas Tuchel	28	22	2	4	70	23	+47	79%	14%
Total		1096	634	257	203	2411	1049	+1362	58%	19%

=== Performance by venue ===
Venue	Played	Won	Drawn	Lost	For	Against	Diff	Win %	Loss %
Home	488	315	104	69	1166	421	+745	65%	14%
Away	478	264	114	98	1055	494	+561	55%	21%
Neutral	130	55	39	36	190	134	+56	42%	28%
Total	1096	634	257	203	2411	1049	+1362	58%	19%

== Competition records ==
=== FIFA World Cup ===
FIFA World Cup record										Qualification record						Manager(s)
Year	Round	Pos	Pld	W	D*	L	GF	GA	Squad	Pld	W	D	L	GF	GA	Manager(s)
(Uruguay) 1930	Not a FIFA member									Not a FIFA member						None
(Kingdom of Italy) 1934	Not a FIFA member									Not a FIFA member						None
(French Fourth Republic) 1938	Not a FIFA member									Not a FIFA member						None
(Fourth Brazilian Republic) 1950	Group stage	8th	3	1	0	2	2	2	Squad	3	3	0	0	14	3	Winterbottom
(Switzerland) 1954	Quarter-finals	7th	3	1	1	1	8	8	Squad	3	3	0	0	11	4	Winterbottom
(Sweden) 1958	Group stage	11th	4	0	3	1	4	5	Squad	4	3	1	0	15	5	Winterbottom
(Chile) 1962	Quarter-finals	8th	4	1	1	2	5	6	Squad	4	3	1	0	16	2	Winterbottom
(England) 1966	Champions	1st	6	5	1	0	11	3	Squad	Qualified as hosts						Ramsey
(Mexico) 1970	Quarter-finals	8th	4	2	0	2	4	4	Squad	Qualified as defending champions						Ramsey
(West Germany) 1974	Did not qualify									4	1	2	1	3	4	Ramsey
(Argentina) 1978	Did not qualify									6	5	0	1	15	4	Revie
(Spain) 1982	Second group stage	6th	5	3	2	0	6	1	Squad	8	4	1	3	13	8	Greenwood
(Mexico) 1986	Quarter-finals	8th	5	2	1	2	7	3	Squad	8	4	4	0	21	2	Robson
(Italy) 1990	Fourth place	4th	7	3	3	1	8	6	Squad	6	3	3	0	10	0	Robson
(United States) 1994	Did not qualify									10	5	3	2	26	9	Taylor
(France) 1998	Round of 16	9th	4	2	1	1	7	4	Squad	8	6	1	1	15	2	Hoddle
(South Korea) (Japan) 2002	Quarter-finals	6th	5	2	2	1	6	3	Squad	8	5	2	1	16	6	Keegan, Wilkinson, Eriksson (Note: Kevin Keegan and Howard Wilkinson managed one qualifying match each: Eriksson managed the remainder of qualification and the finals campaign.)
(Germany) 2006	Quarter-finals	7th	5	3	2	0	6	2	Squad	10	8	1	1	17	5	Eriksson
(South Africa) 2010	Round of 16	13th	4	1	2	1	3	5	Squad	10	9	0	1	34	6	Capello
(Brazil) 2014	Group stage	26th	3	0	1	2	2	4	Squad	10	6	4	0	31	4	Hodgson
(Russia) 2018	Fourth place	4th	7	3	1	3	12	8	Squad	10	8	2	0	18	3	Allardyce, Southgate (Note: Sam Allardyce managed one qualifying match: Gareth Southgate managed the remainder of the qualification and the finals campaign.)
(Qatar) 2022	Quarter-finals	6th	5	3	1	1	13	4	Squad	10	8	2	0	39	3	Southgate
(Canada) (Mexico) (United States) 2026	Third place	3rd	8	6	1	1	20	12	Squad	8	8	0	0	22	0	Tuchel
(Morocco) (Portugal) (Spain) 2030	To be determined									To be determined						
(Saudi Arabia) 2034	To be determined									To be determined						
Total: 17/23	1 title	1st	82	38	23	21	124	80	—	130	92	27	11	336	70	—
Champions Runners-up Third place Fourth place *Draws include knockout matches decided on penalty kicks. **Red border colour indicates tournament was held on home soil. ***England played all of their 2002 matches in Japan. Correct as of 18 July 2026 after the match against France

=== UEFA European Championship ===
UEFA European Championship record										Qualifying record						Manager(s)
Year	Round	Pos	Pld	W	D*	L	GF	GA	Squad	Pld	W	D	L	GF	GA	Manager(s)
(France) 1960	Did not enter									Did not enter						Winterbottom
(Francoist Spain) 1964	Did not qualify									2	0	1	1	3	6	Winterbottom, Ramsey (Note: England were defeated by France in a two-legged elimination round. Ramsey took over from Winterbottom between the two legs.)
(Italy) 1968	Third place	3rd	2	1	0	1	2	1	Squad	8	6	1	1	18	6	Ramsey
(Belgium) 1972	Did not qualify (Note: Although England did not qualify for the finals, they reached the last eight of the competition. Only the last four teams progressed to the finals.)									8	5	2	1	16	6	Ramsey
(Socialist Federal Republic of Yugoslavia) 1976	Did not qualify									6	3	2	1	11	3	Revie
(Italy) 1980	Group stage	6th	3	1	1	1	3	3	Squad	8	7	1	0	22	5	Greenwood
(France) 1984	Did not qualify									8	5	2	1	23	3	Robson
(West Germany) 1988	Group stage	7th	3	0	0	3	2	7	Squad	6	5	1	0	19	1	Robson
(Sweden) 1992	Group stage	7th	3	0	2	1	1	2	Squad	6	3	3	0	7	3	Taylor
(England) 1996	Semi-finals (Note: The third-place play-off had been abolished at Euro 1984, and any team losing in the semi-finals would be placed in third place even if they did not get a bronze medal.)	3rd	5	2	3	0	8	3	Squad	Qualified as hosts						Venables
(Belgium) (Netherlands) 2000	Group stage	11th	3	1	0	2	5	6	Squad	10	4	4	2	16	5	Hoddle, Keegan (Note: Hoddle managed the first three qualifiers, while Keegan managed the remainder of qualification and the finals campaign.)
(Portugal) 2004	Quarter-finals	5th	4	2	1	1	10	6	Squad	8	6	2	0	14	5	Eriksson
(Austria) (Switzerland) 2008	Did not qualify									12	7	2	3	24	7	McClaren
(Poland) (Ukraine) 2012	Quarter-finals	5th	4	2	2	0	5	3	Squad	8	5	3	0	17	5	Capello, Hodgson (Note: Capello managed the qualification campaign. He resigned before the tournament and was replaced by Hodgson.)
(France) 2016	Round of 16	12th	4	1	2	1	4	4	Squad	10	10	0	0	31	3	Hodgson
(Europe) 2020	Runners-up	2nd	7	5	2	0	11	2	Squad	8	7	0	1	37	6	Southgate
(Germany) 2024	Runners-up	2nd	7	3	3	1	8	6	Squad	8	6	2	0	22	4	Southgate
(United Kingdom) (Republic of Ireland) 2028	To be determined									To be determined						
(Italy) (Turkey) 2032	To be determined									To be determined						
Total: 11/17	Runners-up	2nd	45	18	16	11	59	43	—	116	79	26	11	280	68	—
Champions Runners-up Third place/Semi-finalists Fourth place *Draws include knockout matches decided on penalty kicks. **Red border colour indicates tournament was held on home soil. ***Third place includes all tournaments where England reached the semi-finals following Euro 1980 as the third place play-offs were scrapped from the following editions of the tournament. Correct as of 14 July 2024 after the match against Spain

=== UEFA Nations League ===
UEFA Nations League record
League phase												Finals									Manager(s)
Season	LG	GP	Pos	Pld	W	D	L	GF	GA	P/R	RK	Year	Pos	Pld	W	D*	L	GF	GA	Squad	Manager(s)
2018–19	A	4	1st	4	2	1	1	6	5	Same position	3rd	(Portugal) 2019	3rd	2	0	1	1	1	3	Squad	Southgate
2020–21	A	2	3rd	6	3	1	2	7	4	Same position	9th	(Italy) 2021	Did not qualify								Southgate
2022–23	A	3	4th	6	0	3	3	4	10	▼	15th	(Netherlands) 2023	Did not qualify								Southgate
2024–25	B	2	1st	6	5	0	1	16	3	▲	17th	(Germany) 2025	Did not qualify								Carsley
2026–27	A	3	1st	6	5	0	1	19	6	Same position	TBD	TBD 2027	To be determined								Tuchel
Total				28	15	5	8	52	28	3rd		Total		2	0	1	1	1	3	—	—
Champions Runners-up Third place Fourth place *Draws include knockout matches decided on penalty kicks. **Group stage played home and away. Flag shown represents host nation for the finals stage. Correct as of 15 November 2026 after the match against the Spain.

=== Minor tournaments ===
Year	Round	Position	GP	W	D*	L	GS	GA	Ref.
(Brazil) 1964 Taça de Nações	Group stage	3rd	3	0	1	2	2	7	
(United States) 1976 USA Bicentennial Cup Tournament	Group stage	2nd	3	2	0	1	6	4	
(Scotland) 1985 Rous Cup	One match	2nd	1	0	0	1	0	1	
(Mexico) 1985 Ciudad de México Cup Tournament	Group stage	3rd	2	0	0	2	1	3	
(Mexico) 1985 Azteca 2000 Tournament	Group stage	2nd	2	1	0	1	3	1	
(England) 1986 Rous Cup	Winners, one match	1st	1	1	0	0	2	1	
(England) (Scotland) 1987 Rous Cup	Group stage	2nd	2	0	2	0	1	1	
(England) (Scotland) 1988 Rous Cup	Winners, group stage	1st	2	1	1	0	2	1	
(England) (Scotland) 1989 Rous Cup	Winners, group stage	1st	2	1	1	0	2	0	
1991 England Challenge Cup	Winners, group stage	1st	2	1	1	0	5	3	
(England) 1995 Umbro Cup	Group stage	2nd	3	1	1	1	6	7	
1997 Tournoi de France	Winners, group stage	1st	3	2	0	1	3	1	
(Morocco) 1998 King Hassan II International Cup Tournament	Group stage	2nd	2	1	1	0	1	0	
(England) 2004 FA Summer Tournament	Winners, group stage	1st	2	1	1	0	7	2	
Total	6 titles	1st	30	12	9	9	41	32	–
Champions Runners-up Third place *Draws include one match decided on penalty kicks. The last match was played on 5 June 2004 against Iceland.

== Head-to-head record ==
Last match updated on 15 November 2026

Key
Positive balance (more Wins)
Neutral balance (Wins = Losses)
Negative balance (more Losses)

Opponent	Played	Won	Drawn	Lost	For	Against	Win %	First match	Last match	Confederation
Albania	8	8	0	0	23	1	100.00	8 March 1989	16 November 2025	UEFA
Algeria	1	0	1	0	0	0	0.00	18 June 2010	18 June 2010	CAF
Andorra	8	8	0	0	28	0	100.00	2 September 2006	6 September 2025	UEFA
Argentina	15	6	5	3	22	17	40.00	9 May 1951	15 July 2026	CONMEBOL
Australia	8	5	2	1	9	6	62.50	31 May 1980	13 October 2023	AFC
Austria	19	11	4	4	59	27	57.89	6 June 1908	2 June 2021	UEFA
Azerbaijan	2	2	0	0	3	0	100.00	13 October 2004	30 March 2005	UEFA
Belarus	2	2	0	0	6	1	100.00	15 October 2008	14 October 2009	UEFA
Belgium	26	16	6	4	74	33	61.54	21 May 1921	26 March 2024	UEFA
Bohemia	1	1	0	0	4	0	100.00	13 June 1908	13 June 1908	Defunct
Bosnia and Herzegovina	1	1	0	0	3	0	100.00	3 June 2024	3 June 2024	UEFA
Brazil	27	4	11	12	23	35	14.81	9 May 1956	23 March 2024	CONMEBOL
Bulgaria	12	8	4	0	26	2	66.67	7 June 1962	14 October 2019	UEFA
Cameroon	4	3	1	0	9	4	75.00	1 July 1990	26 May 2002	CAF
Canada	1	1	0	0	1	0	100.00	24 May 1986	24 May 1986	CONCACAF
Chile	6	2	2	2	4	5	33.33	25 June 1950	15 November 2013	CONMEBOL
China	1	1	0	0	3	0	100.00	23 May 1996	23 May 1996	AFC
Colombia	6	3	3	0	11	4	50.00	20 May 1970	3 July 2018	CONMEBOL
Commonwealth of Independent States	1	0	1	0	2	2	0.00	29 April 1992	29 April 1992	Defunct
Costa Rica	3	2	1	0	5	0	66.67	24 June 2014	10 June 2026	CONCACAF
Croatia	14	9	2	3	35	16	64.29	24 April 1996	12 November 2026	UEFA
Cyprus	2	2	0	0	6	0	100.00	16 April 1975	11 May 1975	UEFA
Czech Republic	7	5	1	1	16	4	71.43	18 November 1998	6 October 2026	UEFA
Czechoslovakia	12	7	3	2	25	15	58.33	16 May 1934	25 March 1992	Defunct
Denmark	23	13	6	4	39	22	56.52	26 September 1948	20 June 2024	UEFA
DR Congo	1	1	0	0	2	1	100.00	1 July 2026	1 July 2026	CAF
East Germany	4	3	1	0	7	3	75.00	2 June 1963	12 September 1984	Defunct
Ecuador	3	2	1	0	5	2	66.67	24 May 1970	4 June 2014	CONMEBOL
Egypt	3	3	0	0	8	1	100.00	29 January 1986	3 March 2010	CAF
Estonia	4	4	0	0	9	0	100.00	6 June 2007	9 October 2015	UEFA
FIFA European Select	2	1	1	0	7	4	50.00	26 October 1938	21 October 1953	None
FIFA World Select	1	1	0	0	2	1	100.00	23 October 1963	23 October 1963	None
Finland	13	11	2	0	41	8	84.62	20 May 1937	13 October 2024	UEFA
France	33	18	5	10	78	45	54.55	10 May 1923	18 July 2026	UEFA
(Georgia (country)) Georgia	2	2	0	0	4	0	100.00	9 November 1996	30 April 1997	UEFA
Germany	19	7	5	7	33	27	36.84	10 May 1930	26 September 2022	UEFA
Ghana	2	0	2	0	1	1	0.00	29 March 2011	23 June 2026	CAF
Greece	11	8	2	1	27	5	72.73	21 April 1971	14 November 2024	UEFA
Honduras	1	0	1	0	0	0	0.00	7 June 2014	7 June 2014	CONCACAF
Hungary	26	16	3	7	61	36	61.54	10 June 1908	14 June 2022	UEFA
Iceland	6	3	1	2	13	5	50.00	2 June 1982	7 June 2024	UEFA
Iran	1	1	0	0	6	2	100.00	21 November 2022	21 November 2022	AFC
Ireland (IFA) (1882–1950) (Note: Ireland (IFA) results are from 1882 to 1950, the point at which the team ceased selecting players from outside of Northern Ireland. England's last match against this team was Match 251, on 14 November 1949. Results against Northern Ireland start from this point onward. However, the Northern Irish team continued to play under the Ireland name for a number of years (until 1954 in FIFA competitions and into the 1970s for Home Internationals).)	57	46	8	3	230	49	80.70	18 February 1882	16 November 1949	Defunct
Israel	4	2	2	0	5	1	50.00	26 February 1986	8 September 2007	UEFA
Italy	32	10	11	11	39	35	31.25	13 May 1933	17 October 2023	UEFA
Ivory Coast	1	1	0	0	3	0	100.00	29 March 2022	29 March 2022	CAF
Jamaica	1	1	0	0	6	0	100.00	3 June 2006	3 June 2006	CONCACAF
Japan	4	2	1	1	5	4	50.00	3 June 1995	31 March 2026	AFC
Kazakhstan	2	2	0	0	9	1	100.00	11 October 2008	6 June 2009	UEFA
Kosovo	2	2	0	0	9	3	100.00	10 September 2019	17 November 2019	UEFA
Kuwait	1	1	0	0	1	0	100.00	25 June 1982	25 June 1982	AFC
Latvia	2	2	0	0	8	0	100.00	24 March 2025	14 October 2025	UEFA
Liechtenstein	2	2	0	0	4	0	100.00	29 March 2003	10 September 2003	UEFA
Lithuania	4	4	0	0	10	0	100.00	27 March 2015	8 October 2017	UEFA
Luxembourg	9	9	0	0	47	3	100.00	21 May 1927	4 September 1999	UEFA
Malaysia	1	1	0	0	4	2	100.00	12 June 1991	12 June 1991	AFC
Malta	7	7	0	0	20	1	100.00	3 February 1971	17 November 2023	UEFA
Mexico	10	7	1	2	26	6	70.00	24 May 1959	5 July 2026	CONCACAF
Moldova	4	4	0	0	16	0	100.00	1 September 1996	6 September 2013	UEFA
Montenegro	6	3	3	0	19	5	50.00	12 October 2010	14 November 2019	UEFA
Morocco	2	1	1	0	1	0	50.00	6 June 1986	27 May 1998	CAF
Netherlands	23	7	9	7	33	30	30.43	18 May 1935	10 July 2024	UEFA
New Zealand	3	3	0	0	4	0	100.00	3 June 1991	6 June 2026	OFC
Nigeria	3	2	1	0	3	1	66.67	16 November 1994	2 June 2018	CAF
North Macedonia	6	3	3	0	13	4	50.00	16 October 2002	20 November 2023	UEFA
Northern Ireland (1950—)	41	29	8	4	93	32	70.73	7 October 1950	7 September 2005	UEFA
Norway	13	8	3	2	30	8	61.54	14 May 1937	11 July 2026	UEFA
Panama	2	2	0	0	8	1	100.00	24 June 2018	27 June 2026	CONCACAF
Paraguay	3	3	0	0	8	0	100.00	18 June 1986	10 June 2006	CONMEBOL
Peru	3	2	0	1	8	4	66.67	17 May 1959	30 May 2014	CONMEBOL
Poland	21	12	8	1	33	13	57.14	5 January 1966	8 September 2021	UEFA
Portugal	23	10	10	3	46	25	43.48	25 May 1947	2 June 2016	UEFA
Republic of Ireland	19	8	8	2	30	14	42.10	30 September 1946	17 November 2024	UEFA
Romania	12	3	6	3	11	10	25.00	24 May 1939	6 June 2021	UEFA
Russia	3	1	1	1	5	3	33.33	12 September 2007	11 June 2016	UEFA (Note: Membership currently suspended in response to the 2022 Russian invasion of Ukraine)
San Marino	8	8	0	0	52	1	100.00	17 February 1993	15 November 2021	UEFA
Saudi Arabia	2	0	2	0	1	1	0.00	16 November 1988	23 May 1998	AFC
Scotland	116	49	26	41	206	175	42.24	13 November 1872	12 September 2023	UEFA
Senegal	2	1	0	1	4	3	50.00	4 December 2022	10 June 2025	CAF
Serbia	3	3	0	0	8	0	100.00	16 June 2024	13 November 2025	UEFA
Serbia and Montenegro	1	1	0	0	2	1	100.00	3 June 2003	3 June 2003	Defunct
Slovakia	7	6	1	0	13	4	85.71	12 October 2002	30 June 2024	UEFA
Slovenia	7	5	2	0	10	4	71.43	5 September 2009	25 June 2024	UEFA
South Africa	2	2	0	0	4	2	100.00	24 May 1997	22 May 2003	CAF
South Korea	1	0	1	0	1	1	0.00	21 May 2002	21 May 2002	AFC
Soviet Union	11	5	3	3	19	13	45.45	18 May 1958	21 May 1991	Defunct
Spain	30	14	4	12	51	39	46.67	15 May 1929	15 November 2026	UEFA
Sweden	25	9	9	7	40	32	36.00	21 May 1923	7 July 2018	UEFA
Switzerland	28	18	7	3	60	21	64.29	20 May 1933	6 July 2024	UEFA
Trinidad and Tobago	2	2	0	0	5	0	100.00	15 June 2006	1 June 2008	CONCACAF
Tunisia	3	2	1	0	5	2	66.67	2 June 1990	18 June 2018	CAF
Turkey	11	9	2	0	33	1	81.82	14 November 1984	22 May 2016	UEFA
Ukraine	10	6	3	1	16	4	60.00	31 May 2000	9 September 2023	UEFA
United States	12	8	2	2	39	9	66.67	29 June 1950	25 November 2022	CONCACAF
Uruguay	12	3	4	5	12	16	25.00	31 May 1953	27 March 2026	CONMEBOL
Wales	105	70	21	14	256	91	66.67	18 January 1879	9 October 2025	UEFA
West Germany	16	7	3	6	24	19	43.75	1 December 1954	4 July 1990	Defunct
Yugoslavia	14	5	5	4	23	20	35.71	18 May 1939	13 December 1989	Defunct
Total	1096	634	257	203	2411	1049	58%	13 November 1872	15 November 2026	—

- England–Scotland football rivalry
- England–Germany football rivalry

=== Combined predecessor and successor records ===
Opponent	Preceding team(s)	Played	Won	Drawn	Lost	For	Against	Win %
Czech Republic	Bohemia; Czechoslovakia	20	13	4	3	45	19	65.00
Germany	(Germany) Weimar Republic; Nazi Germany; West Germany	35	14	8	13	57	46	40.00
Northern Ireland	Ireland (IFA)	98	75	16	7	323	81	76.53
Republic of Ireland	Irish Free State	19	8	8	2	30	14	42.10
Russia	Soviet Union; Commonwealth of Independent States	14	6	4	4	25	17	42.86
Serbia	Yugoslavia; FR Yugoslavia; Serbia and Montenegro	18	9	5	4	33	21	50.00

=== List of FIFA members who have never played against England ===
AFC

- Afghanistan
- Bahrain
- Bangladesh
- Bhutan
- Brunei
- Cambodia
- Chinese Taipei
- East Timor
- Guam
- Hong Kong
- India
- Indonesia
- Iraq
- Jordan
- Kyrgyzstan
- Laos
- Lebanon
- Macao
- Maldives
- Mongolia
- Myanmar
- Nepal
- North Korea
- Oman
- Pakistan
- Palestine
- Philippines
- Qatar
- Singapore
- Sri Lanka
- Syria
- Tajikistan
- Thailand
- Turkmenistan
- United Arab Emirates
- Uzbekistan
- Vietnam
- Yemen

CAF

- Angola
- Benin
- Botswana
- Burkina Faso
- Burundi
- Cape Verde
- Central African Republic
- Chad
- Comoros
- (Republic of the Congo) Congo
- Djibouti
- Equatorial Guinea
- Eritrea
- Eswatini
- Ethiopia
- Gabon
- Gambia
- Guinea
- Guinea-Bissau
- Kenya
- Lesotho
- Liberia
- Libya
- Madagascar
- Malawi
- Mali
- Mauritania
- Mauritius
- Mozambique
- Namibia
- Niger
- Rwanda
- São Tomé and Príncipe
- Seychelles
- Sierra Leone
- Somalia
- South Sudan
- Sudan
- Tanzania
- Togo
- Uganda
- Zambia
- Zimbabwe

CONCACAF

- Anguilla
- Antigua and Barbuda
- Aruba
- Bahamas
- Barbados
- Belize
- Bermuda
- British Virgin Islands
- Cayman Islands
- Cuba
- Curaçao
- Dominica
- Dominican Republic
- El Salvador
- Grenada
- Guatemala
- Guyana
- Haiti
- Montserrat
- Nicaragua
- Puerto Rico
- Saint Kitts and Nevis
- Saint Lucia
- Saint Vincent and the Grenadines
- Suriname
- Turks and Caicos Islands
- U.S. Virgin Islands

CONMEBOL

- Bolivia
- Venezuela

OFC

- American Samoa
- Cook Islands
- Fiji
- New Caledonia
- Papua New Guinea
- Samoa
- Solomon Islands
- Tahiti
- Tonga
- Vanuatu

UEFA

- Armenia
- Faroe Islands
- Gibraltar

== FIFA Rankings ==
Last update was on 12 February 2026. Source:

England's FIFA world rankings
Year	Games Played	Won	Drawn	Lost	Best Rank	Worst Rank
2026	0	0	0	0	TBC	TBC
2025	8	7	0	1	4	4
2024	17	9	4	4	3	5
2023	10	8	2	0	3	5
2022	13	5	4	4	5	5
2021	19	15	4	0	4	5
2020	8	5	1	2	4	4
2019	10	7	1	2	4	5
2018	17	10	3	4	5	16
2017	10	5	3	2	12	15
2016	14	8	4	2	9	13
2015	10	7	2	1	8	17
2014	13	8	3	2	10	20
2013	12	6	4	2	4	17
2012	13	7	4	2	3	7
2011	9	6	3	0	4	8
2010	12	7	3	2	6	9
2009	11	7	1	3	6	9
2008	10	8	1	1	8	15
2007	12	6	2	4	6	12
2006	14	9	4	1	4	10
2005	11	8	1	2	6	11
2004	14	7	4	3	6	13
2003	11	8	1	2	6	10
2002	13	4	7	2	6	12
2001	10	7	2	1	9	17
2000	11	3	4	4	11	17
1999	10	4	4	2	10	14
1998	14	6	5	3	5	11
1997	11	8	1	2	4	14
1996	12	8	4	0	12	27
1995	8	2	5	1	18	22
1994	6	4	2	0	12	18
1993	11	4	3	4	5	11
1992	12	4	6	2	5	5
