= Marisela (name) =

Marisela, or its alternative form Maricela, is a feminine given name.

People with the name include:

- Marisela Arizmendi, Mexican gymnast
- Marisela Cantú (born 1990), Mexican gymnast
- Maricela Chávez (born 1962), Mexican racewalker
- Maricela Contreras Julián (born 1961), Mexican politician
- Maricela Cornejo (born 1987), American boxer
- Marisela de Montecristo (born 1992), Salvadoran model
- Marisela Escobedo Ortiz (1958–2010), Mexican activist
- Marisela Esqueda (born 1966), American-Mexican singer
- Maricela González (born 1968), Colombian actress
- Maricela Montemayor (born 1991), Mexican sprint canoeist
- Marisela Morales (disambiguation), multiple people
- Marisela Moreno (born 1972), Panamanian model
- Marisela Norte, American writer
- Marisela Peralta (born 1955), Dominican Republic hurdler
- Marisela Puicón, Peruvian singer
- Maricela Serrano Hernández (born 1961), Mexican politician
- Marisela Treviño Orta, American dramatist
- Maricela Velázquez, Mexican politician
