= Cuauhtémoc Blanco =

Mexican footballer and politician (born 1973)

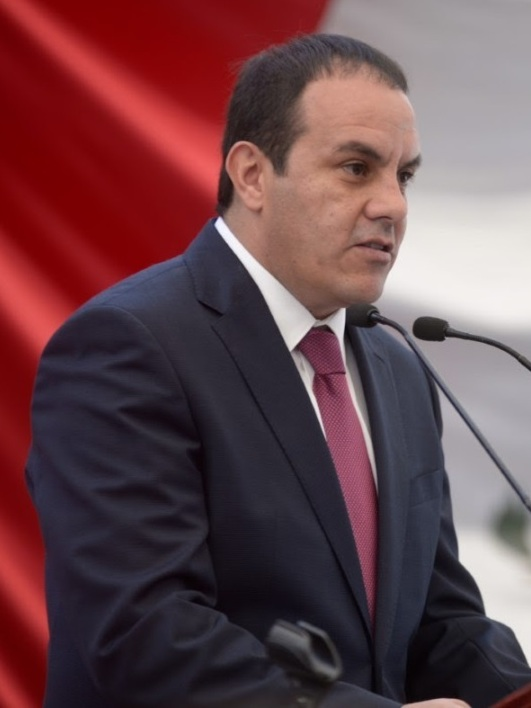
- Blanco in 2024

Member of the Chamber of Deputies
- Incumbent
- Assumed office 31 August 2024

Governor of Morelos
- In office 1 October 2018 – 31 August 2024
- Preceded by: Graco Ramírez
- Succeeded by: Margarita González Saravia

Municipal president of Cuernavaca
- In office 1 January 2016 – 2 April 2018
- Preceded by: Jorge Morales Barud
- Succeeded by: Denisse Arizmendi Villegas

Personal details
- Born: Cuauhtémoc Blanco Bravo; 17 January 1973 (age 53) Mexico City, Mexico
- Party: MORENA (since 2022)
- Other political affiliations: Social Democratic Party (2015–2016); Independent (2016–2017); Social Encounter Party (2017–2022)
- Height: 5 ft 10 in (1.78 m)
- Spouses: Marisela Santoyo (m. 1996; div. 2003) Natalia Rezende (m. 2015)
- Children: 5
- Occupation: Footballer (retired); Politician
Association football career
- Positions: Forward; attacking midfielder
Youth career
- 1988–1992: América
Senior career*
Years	Team	Apps	(Gls)
1992–2007	América	308	(108)
1997–1998	→ Necaxa (loan)	18	(11)
2000–2002	→ Real Valladolid (loan)	23	(3)
2004	→ Veracruz (loan)	15	(5)
2007–2009	Chicago Fire	62	(16)
2008	→ Santos Laguna (loan)	4	(1)
2010	Veracruz	14	(5)
2010–2011	Irapuato	47	(9)
2012–2013	Dorados	40	(14)
2013–2014	BUAP	22	(6)
2014–2015	Puebla	19	(3)
2016	América	1	(0)
Total		573	(181)
International career
1995–2014	Mexico	119	(38)
Medal record
Men's football
Representing Mexico
FIFA Confederations Cup
Winner	1999 Mexico
Third place	1995 Saudi Arabia
Copa América
Third place	1997 Bolivia
Third place	1999 Paraguay
Third place	2007 Venezuela
CONCACAF Gold Cup
Winner	1996 United States
Winner	1998 United States
Runner-up	2007 United States
Pan American Games
Silver medal – second place	1995 Mar del Plata	Team
CONCACAF Pre-Olympic Tournament
Winner	1996 Canada
- * Club domestic league appearances and goals

Cuauhtémoc Blanco Bravo (Spanish pronunciation: [kwawˈtemok ˈblaŋko]; born 17 January 1973) is a Mexican politician and former professional footballer serving as a member of the Chamber of Deputies.

He served as the Governor of Morelos from 2018 to 2024 under the coalition Juntos Haremos Historia, and as the mayor of Cuernavaca, Morelos.

As a footballer, Blanco was known for his attacking ability and played most of his career as a deep-lying forward and his last years as an attacking midfielder. Blanco is considered to be one of the greatest Mexican and North American footballers of all time.

== Early life ==
Blanco was born in Mexico City, in the district of Tlatilco, but grew up in Tepito. Born to Faustino Blanco and Hortensia Bravo, he was named after the last Aztec emperor Cuauhtémoc, in which the name means "one who has descended like an eagle".

== Football career ==
=== Beginnings ===
Blanco started his career with América in 1992, where he won various awards, both team-based and individual, and had various loan stints with Necaxa, Spanish club Real Valladolid, and Veracruz. In 2007, he joined the Chicago Fire, with a loan stint with Santos Laguna for the 2008 Apertura championship. In 2010, he returned to Mexico to trek throughout various teams, joining Veracruz again, Irapuato, Dorados, and Puebla-based teams Lobos BUAP and Puebla, where he retired with the latter in 2015. The following year, he came out of retirement to officially end his career with América.

=== Club career ===
==== Club América ====
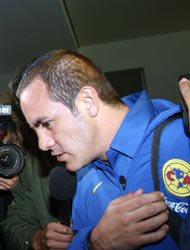
Blanco with América

Having played most of his career in América, with 333 appearances and 135 goals, Blanco has become an idol to the club's supporters and an important figure in the history of the team.

Blanco made his debut in the Mexican Primera División in 1992 at the age of 19 with América. He won his first Golden Boot with 16 goals in the Winter 1998 season for Las Águilas. He was loaned for Winter 1997 and Summer 1998 at Necaxa, in which he scored 13 goals in 28 appearances. Blanco was later loaned to Real Valladolid of La Liga for the 2000–01 season. However, he suffered a broken leg while on international duty which kept him out of the side for six months. Blanco returned to Valladolid for another loan spell the following season, but he struggled with homesickness and regaining his form. He had a knack for scoring great goals in La Liga, with most notable, a free-kick against Real Madrid at the Santiago Bernabéu Stadium.

He returned to Mexico and spent the 2004 Apertura season with Veracruz, where they ended up winning their group, but were defeated in the playoffs by UNAM. Blanco was a popular player during his time there. In May 2005, Blanco won his first club championship as a player, leading Club América to its tenth league title, when Club América defeated U.A.G. by an aggregate score of 7–4 (1–1, 6–3). In the next three consecutive years between 2005 and 2007, he was awarded the MVP.

He scored his final goal during the championship final against Pachuca in 2007.

==== Chicago Fire ====
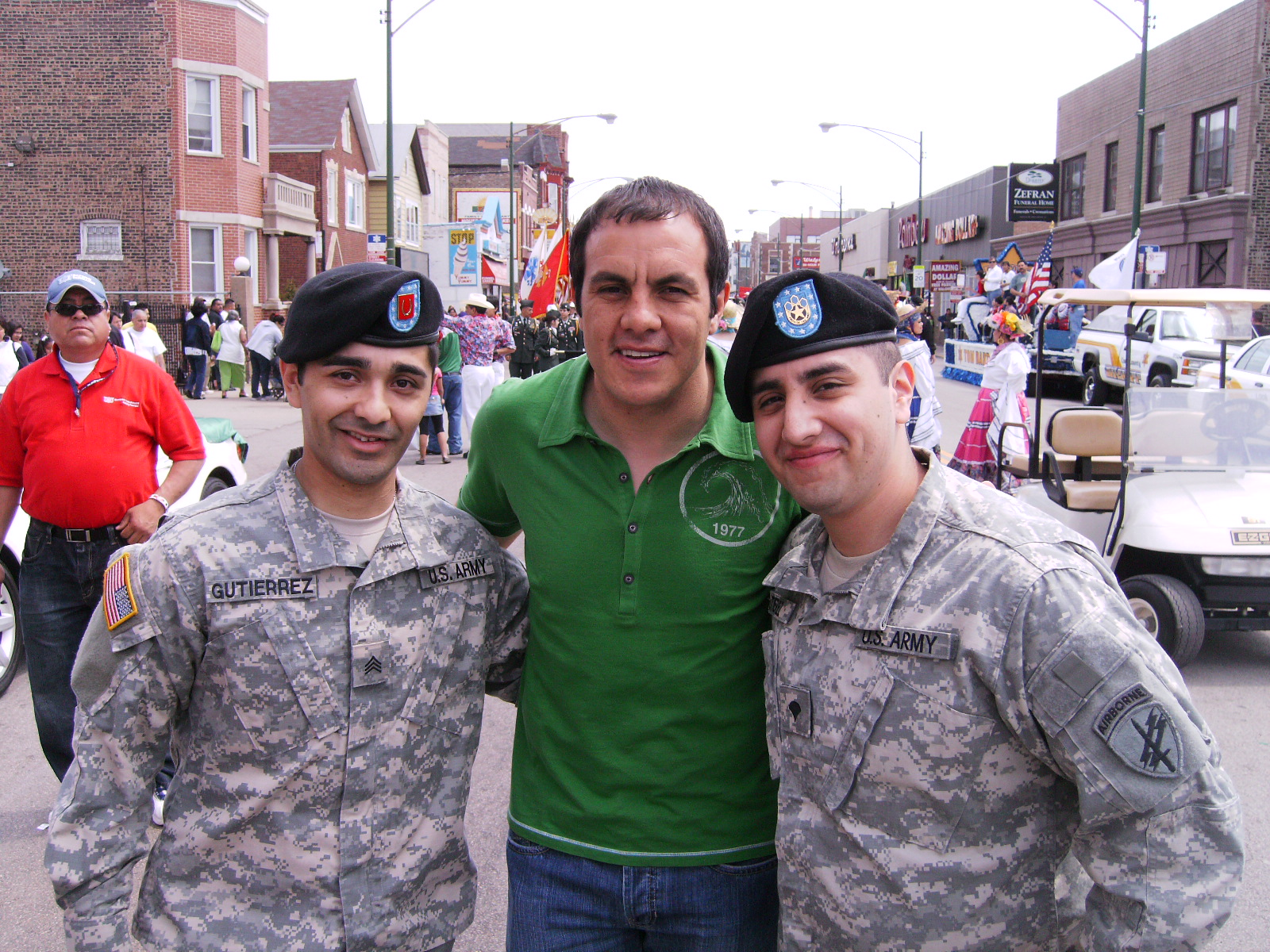
Blanco in Chicago in 2009 during his time with the Chicago Fire

On 2 April 2007, Blanco ventured on to Major League Soccer in the United States and signed with Chicago Fire. He was welcomed by 5,000 fans at Toyota Park as he conducted interviews with the media, signed autographs and greeted with fans.

He was later voted as a finalist for both the MVP and Newcomer of the Year awards in 2007. Blanco was the 2007 Goal of the Year winner, for his goal against Real Salt Lake.

Blanco was the second-highest paid player in Major League Soccer, after LA Galaxy midfielder David Beckham, earning $2.7 million a year. Once again, he was a finalist for the MVP of the year award.

On 24 July 2008, in the All-Stars Game against West Ham United, Blanco won the MVP award with one assist and one goal, a game in which he only played 46 minutes. The MLS All-stars won 3–2.

==== Santos Laguna (loan) ====
On 19 November 2008, it was announced that Santos Laguna signed Blanco on a loan to play only for the Apertura 2008 championship, after the injury of their Ecuadorian striker Christian Benítez. Blanco was formally presented to the press the next day, wearing the number 9 jersey, and stated that he looked forward to giving Santos a back-to-back championship. On 29 November 2008, Blanco scored his first goal with Santos, a penalty in the second leg of the championship quarter-finals against San Luis.

==== Later career ====
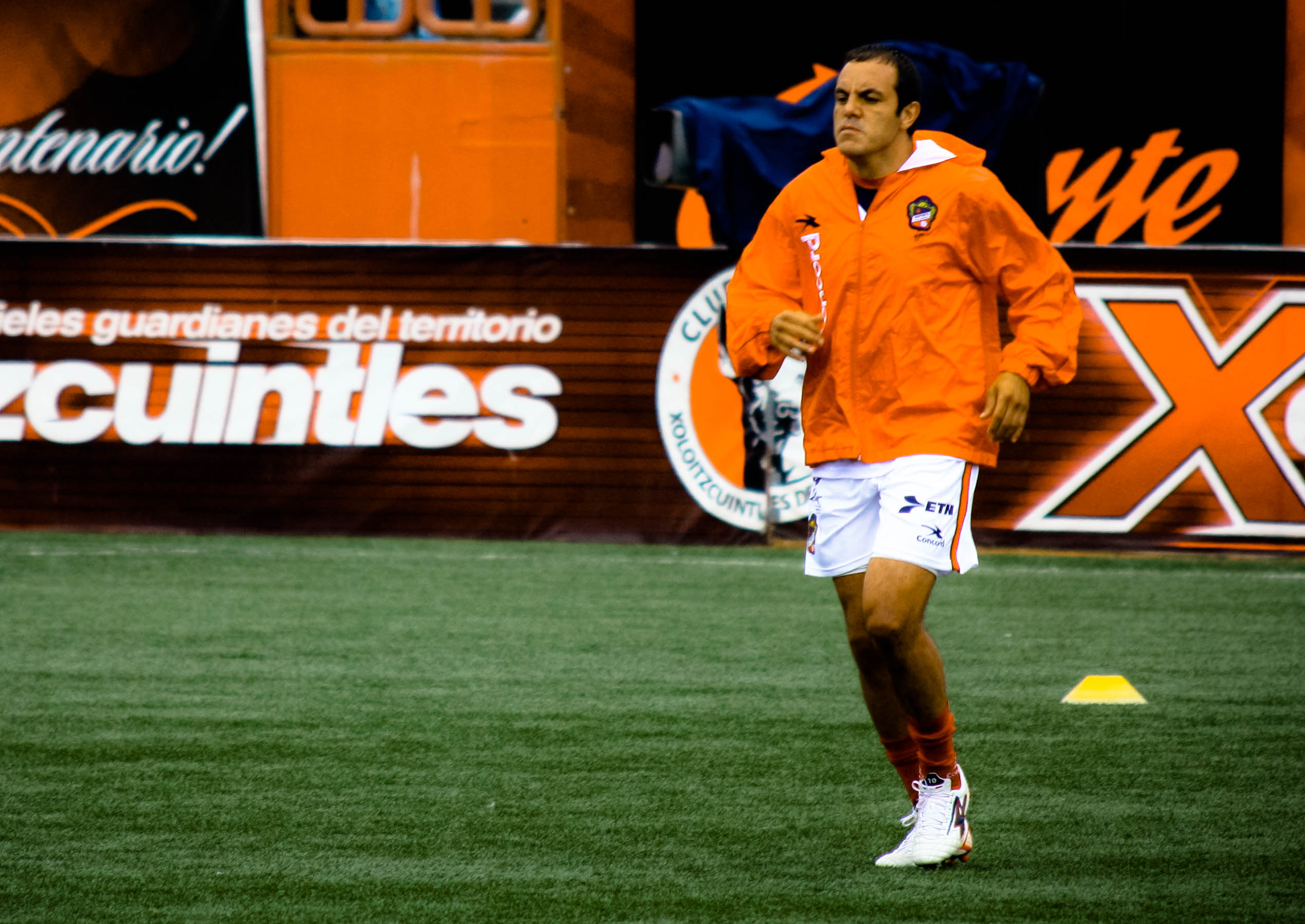
Blanco warming up with Irapuato in 2010

In October 2009, Blanco announced he would not be renewing his contract with Chicago Fire and would instead sign with Veracruz of the Ascenso MX beginning in January 2010. However, after 6 months with Veracruz he left for Irapuato. Led by Blanco, Irapuato won the 2011 Clausura, but the team failed to advance to the Primera División, losing to Tijuana in the promotional final.

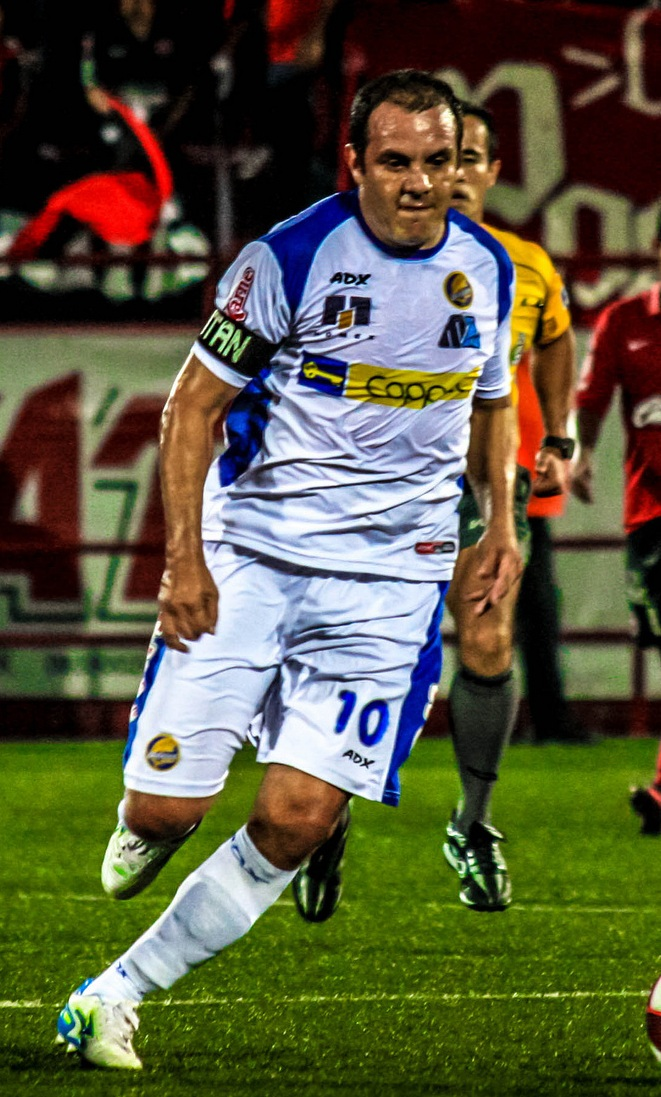
Blanco playing for Dorados in 2012

In December 2011, Blanco joined Dorados de Sinaloa of Liga de Ascenso. During Apertura 2012, Blanco won the Copa MX with Dorados. Despite Blanco announcing he would retire after the end of 2012, he changed his mind and played for another six months with Dorados. However, after the tournament ended, he did not renew his contract and was released from the team in June 2013.

Blanco signed for Lobos BUAP for the Apertura 2013 Liga de Ascenso season. After one year with the club, he did not renew his contract with BUAP and was released from the club at the end of the season, in which the club failed to qualify for the play-offs.

After considering retirement, Blanco signed with Puebla for one last season in the Liga MX. On 21 April 2015, he played in the Clausura's Copa MX final against Guadalajara, coming off the bench. Puebla went on to win the cup, and sent Blanco off as a champion in what was supposed to be the final game of his career.

On 22 February 2016, a month into his political career, it was announced that Blanco would participate in an official Liga MX match during the Week 9 of Clausura 2016 for the club that started his career, Club América. It would allow him to officially end his career, while playing for the club. On 5 March, Blanco started the match wearing a number 100 jersey, and played 36 minutes for América at the Estadio Azteca in a match against Morelia, before being replaced by Darwin Quintero. During the match, Blanco demonstrated his signature move, the Cuauhtemiña, and had two shots on goal, one of which hit the crossbar from the outside of the penalty box. The match was eventually won by América 4–1.

=== International career ===
Blanco represented Mexico from 1995 to 2010 (with a special appearance in 2014). He was capped 120 times and scored 38 goals. Blanco is the only Mexican to have won Confederations Cup awards, being awarded the Silver Ball and Silver Boot at the 1999 Confederations Cup after a first-place finish on home soil, until Oswaldo Sánchez's Golden Glove award in 2005. In 2010, he became the first Mexican to score at three World Cup tournaments, a feat later equalled by Rafael Márquez and Javier Hernández, appearing in the 1998, 2002, and 2010 editions of the tournament.

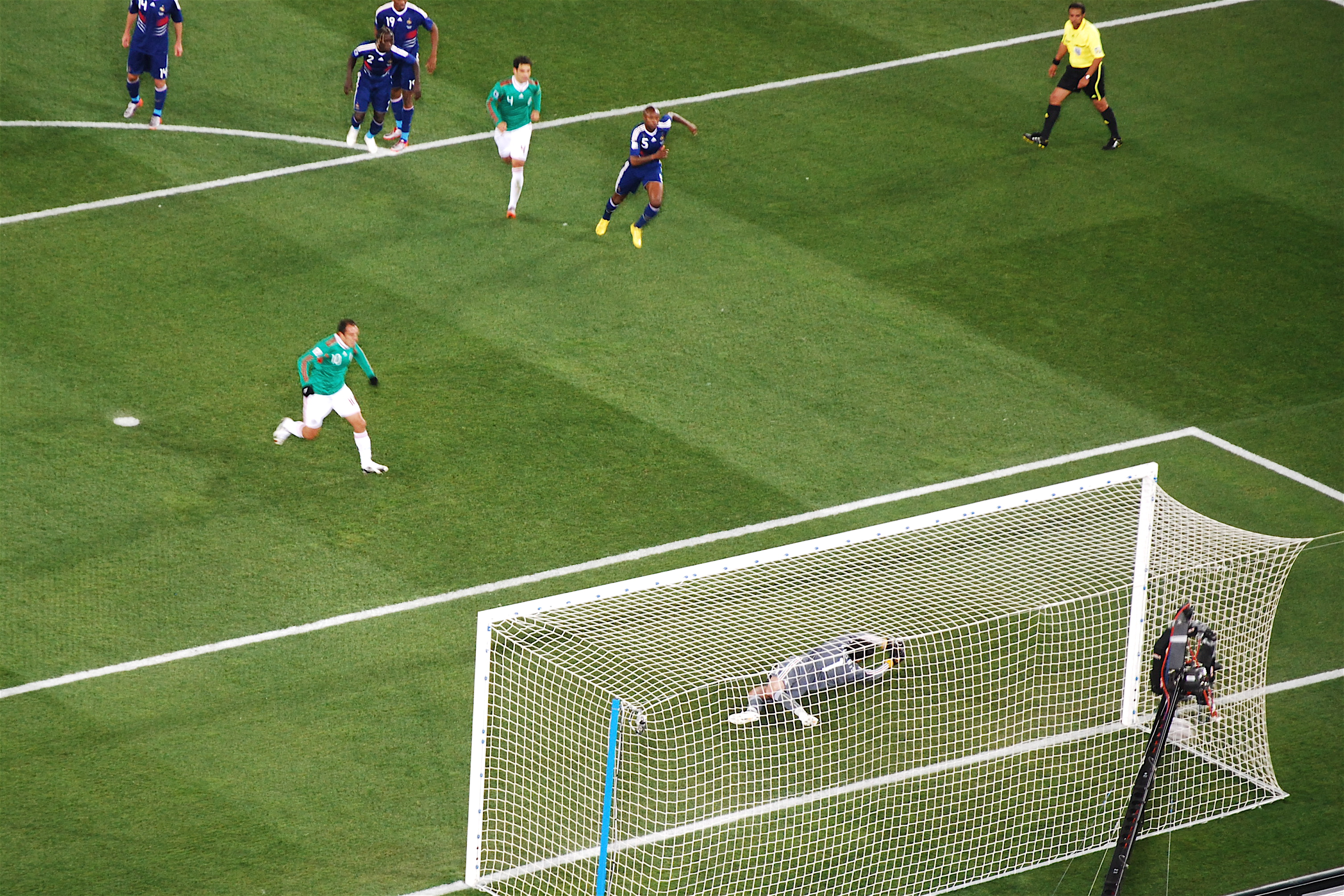
Blanco converting a penalty against France at the 2010 World Cup

Blanco made his debut with the senior national team under Bora Milutinovic in a friendly match against Uruguay on 1 February 1995. Blanco has played for Mexico at three World Cups; he was part of the squad at France 1998, Korea-Japan 2002 and South Africa 2010. He was also a member of the team that won the Confederations Cup in 1999 where he was the tournament's leading scorer with six goals, including the winning goal at the Estadio Azteca against Brazil in the final. He was awarded the "Silver Shoe" and "Silver Ball" for outstanding player of the tournament. Blanco holds the record along with Brazilian Ronaldinho as the highest scoring players in the Confederations Cup with nine goals, three in 1997 and six in 1999.

In the selection for the final 23-man squad for the 2006 FIFA World Cup in Germany, then national team coach Ricardo La Volpe left Blanco out of the team. While the ostensible reason given was that Blanco was frequently injured and not in good form, some people considered this to be a consequence of the previous year's constant bickering, due to on-going personal problems between coach and player.

Blanco became part of the squad that played the 2007 CONCACAF Gold Cup, scoring one penalty goal, and the 2007 Copa América, where he scored 2 goals also from penalty kicks. On 13 September 2008, he earned his 100th cap for his country in its 2–1 World Cup qualifier victory over Canada at Tuxtla Gutiérrez, coming on with only 15 seconds left in regulation time. After the match, he announced his retirement from international football.

With the return of Javier Aguirre as coach, Blanco returned to the national team in May 2009. He played in all the games throughout the Hexagonal of the World Cup Qualifying. Since then, Blanco has become an important factor in Mexico's team regaining form and confidence.

On 10 October 2009, Blanco provoked the first opposition own goal and scored the second goal in a 4–1 victory over El Salvador to help Mexico clinch a spot in the 2010 World Cup. On 17 June 2010, he scored a penalty in the 78th minute of the 2–0 win against France at the World Cup's second round of group stage matches in South Africa. With this goal he became the first Mexican to score a goal in three World Cup tournaments and the third-oldest goalscorer in World Cup history.

Blanco played a tribute game in 2014 against Israel at the Estadio Azteca, which symbolized his official retirement from international football. Mexico went on to win the match 3–0.

=== Player profile ===
==== Style of play ====
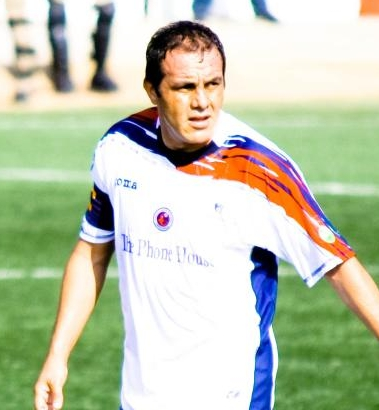
Blanco as captain with Veracruz

Blanco is considered to be one of the greatest Mexican footballers of all time, as well as one of the best penalty takers of all time, having scored 71 out of 73 penalties in his career, giving him a 97.26% success rate from the spot.

His aggressive and confrontative playing style was reflected both on and off the field, pulling ingenious plays and being combative against the press, players, and coaches alike.

==== Cuauteminha ====
Blanco is also remembered for the Cuauteminha, or Blanco Trick, which he performed notably at the 1998 World Cup. In the trick, when two or more opposition players are trying to take the ball from him, he traps the ball between his feet and jumps through the defenders – releasing the ball in the air and landing with it under control as he leaves the opposition players behind. The trick is easy to perform but is eye-catching and has been incorporated as a special skill into the FIFA series of football video games.

==== Celebration ====
Blanco himself has accepted on Mexican television and to the press that his goal celebration is an imitation of the "Archer" celebration created by former Atletico de Madrid striker Kiko Narvaez. In a 2005 interview with Mexican newspaper El Universal, Blanco explains that while watching a Spanish league game accompanied by his teammate Germán Villa, both players agreed to celebrate their next goal by imitating the "Archer" gesture. In the end, only Blanco did it, and jokingly reprimanded Villa for not keeping his word. However, the Chicago Fire official website claimed that Blanco celebrates scoring a goal by acting like the Prehispanic Tlatoani Aztec emperor Cuauhtémoc, "in order to show respect for the Mexican people, and their indigenous Amerindian heritage".

==== Reception ====
Blanco is considered one of the most influential figures in recent Mexican footballing history. Tom Marshall of ESPN states "the battles, brawls, golazos, insults, intensity and passion with which Blanco [...] lived both on and off the pitch, he left a deep imprint on the Mexican game and a colorful story painted by the kind of character arguably lacking at present."

== Career statistics ==
=== Club ===
Club performance			League		Cup		Continental		Total	
Club	Season	League	Apps	Goals	Apps	Goals	Apps	Goals	Apps	Goals
América	1992–93	Primera División	12	0	–		–		12	0
América	1993–94	Primera División	14	0	–		–		14	0
América	1994–95	Primera División	28	6	–		–		28	6
América	1995–96	Primera División	32	0	–		–		32	0
América	1996–97	Primera División	27	9	–		–		27	9
América	Total		113	15	–				113	15
Necaxa (loan)	1997–98	Primera División	15	6	–		–		15	6
Necaxa (loan)	1998–99	Primera División	3	5	–		–		3	5
Necaxa (loan)	Total		18	11	–				18	11
América	1998–99	Primera División	16	16	–		–		16	16
América	1999–2000	Primera División	29	24	–		–		29	24
América	Total		45	40	–		–		45	40
Real Valladolid (loan)	2000–01	La Liga	3	0	–		–		3	0
Real Valladolid (loan)	2001–02	La Liga	20	3	–		–		20	3
Real Valladolid (loan)	Total		23	3	–		–		23	3
América	2002–03	Primera División	36	11	–		–		36	11
América	2003–04	Primera División	38	20	–		–		38	20
América	Total		74	31	–		–		74	31
Veracruz (loan)	2004–05	Primera División	15	5	–		–		15	5
América	2004–05	Primera División	14	4	–		–		14	4
América	2005–06	Primera División	28	7	–		–		28	7
América	2006–07	Primera División	34	11	–		–		34	11
América	Total		76	22	–		–		76	22
Chicago Fire	2007	Major League Soccer	14	4	–		–		14	4
Chicago Fire	2008	Major League Soccer	27	7	–		–		27	7
Chicago Fire	2009	Major League Soccer	21	5	–		4	2	25	7
Chicago Fire	Total		62	16	–		4	2	66	18
Santos Laguna (loan)	2008–09	Primera División	4	1	–		–		4	1
Veracruz	2009–10	Liga de Ascenso	14	5	–					
Irapuato	2010–11	Liga de Ascenso	39	8	–					
Irapuato	2011–12	Liga de Ascenso	8	1	–					
Irapuato	Total		47	9	–		–			
Dorados	2011–12	Liga de Ascenso	13	5	–					
Dorados	2012–13	Ascenso MX	27	9	10	2				
Dorados	Total		40	14	10	2	–			
BUAP	2013–14	Ascenso MX	22	6	1	0	–		23	6
Puebla	2014–15	Liga MX	19	3	11	4	–		30	7
América	2015–16	Liga MX	1	0	–		–			
Career total			573	181	22	6			595	187

=== International ===
National team	Year	Apps	Goals
Mexico	1995	1	0
Mexico	1996	11	3
Mexico	1997	15	4
Mexico	1998	15	3
Mexico	1999	18	8
Mexico	2000	4	5
Mexico	2001	4	5
Mexico	2002	7	1
Mexico	2003	2	0
Mexico	2004	2	0
Mexico	2005	4	0
Mexico	2006	1	0
Mexico	2007	11	4
Mexico	2008	3	0
Mexico	2009	7	3
Mexico	2010	14	2
Mexico	2014	1	0
Total		120	38

=== International goals ===
Scores and results list Mexico's goal tally first.

Goal	Date	Venue	Opponent	Score	Result	Competition
1.	21 January 1996	L.A. Memorial Coliseum, Los Angeles, United States	Brazil	2–0	2–0	1996 CONCACAF Gold Cup
2.	7 February 1996	Estadio Sausalito, Viña del Mar, Chile	Chile	1–0	1–2	Friendly
3.	16 June 1996	Rose Bowl, Pasadena, United States	United States	2–1	2–2	1996 U.S. Cup
4.	22 June 1997	Estadio Félix Capriles, Cochabamba, Bolivia	Ecuador	1–1	1–1	1997 Copa América
5.	14 December 1997	King Fahd International Stadium, Riyadh, Saudi Arabia	Saudi Arabia	3–0	5–0	1997 FIFA Confederations Cup
6.	14 December 1997	King Fahd International Stadium, Riyadh, Saudi Arabia	Saudi Arabia	5–0	5–0	1997 FIFA Confederations Cup
7.	16 December 1997	King Fahd International Stadium, Riyadh, Saudi Arabia	Brazil	1–1	2–3	1997 FIFA Confederations Cup
8.	7 February 1998	Oakland–Alameda County Coliseum, Oakland, United States	Honduras	1–0	2–0	1998 CONCACAF Gold Cup
9.	7 February 1998	Oakland–Alameda County Coliseum, Oakland, United States	Honduras	2–0	2–0	1998 CONCACAF Gold Cup
10.	20 June 1998	Parc Lescure, Bordeaux, France	Belgium	2–2	2–2	1998 FIFA World Cup
11.	6 July 1999	Antonio Oddone Sarubbi, Ciudad del Este, Paraguay	Venezuela	1–0	3–1	1999 Copa América
12.	6 July 1999	Antonio Oddone Sarubbi, Ciudad del Este, Paraguay	Venezuela	3–0	3–1	1999 Copa América
13.	25 July 1999	Estadio Azteca, Mexico City, Mexico	Saudi Arabia	1–0	5–1	1999 FIFA Confederations Cup
14.	25 July 1999	Estadio Azteca, Mexico City, Mexico	Saudi Arabia	2–0	5–1	1999 FIFA Confederations Cup
15.	25 July 1999	Estadio Azteca, Mexico City, Mexico	Saudi Arabia	4–1	5–1	1999 FIFA Confederations Cup
16.	25 July 1999	Estadio Azteca, Mexico City, Mexico	Saudi Arabia	5–1	5–1	1999 FIFA Confederations Cup
17.	1 August 1999	Estadio Azteca, Mexico City, Mexico	United States	1–0	1–0	1999 FIFA Confederations Cup
18.	4 August 1999	Estadio Azteca, Mexico City, Mexico	Brazil	4–2	4–3	1999 FIFA Confederations Cup
19.	9 January 2000	Networks Associates Coliseum, Oakland, United States	Iran	2–0	2–1	Friendly
20.	3 September 2000	Estadio Azteca, Mexico City, Mexico	Panama	4–0	7–1	2002 FIFA World Cup qualifier
21.	3 September 2000	Estadio Azteca, Mexico City, Mexico	Panama	7–1	7–1	2002 FIFA World Cup qualifier
22.	8 October 2000	Estadio Azteca, Mexico City, Mexico	Trinidad and Tobago	1–0	7–1	2002 FIFA World Cup qualifier
23.	8 October 2000	Estadio Azteca, Mexico City, Mexico	Trinidad and Tobago	3–0	7–1	2002 FIFA World Cup qualifier
24.	2 September 2001	Independence Park, Kingston, Jamaica	Jamaica	1–1	2–1	2002 FIFA World Cup qualifier
25.	2 September 2001	Independence Park, Kingston, Jamaica	Jamaica	2–1	2–1	2002 FIFA World Cup qualifier
26.	5 September 2001	Estadio Azteca, Mexico City, Mexico	Trinidad and Tobago	3–0	3–0	2002 FIFA World Cup qualifier
27.	11 November 2001	Estadio Azteca, Mexico City, Mexico	Honduras	1–0	3–0	2002 FIFA World Cup qualifier
28.	11 November 2001	Estadio Azteca, Mexico City, Mexico	Honduras	3–0	3–0	2002 FIFA World Cup qualifier
29.	3 June 2002	Niigata Stadium, Niigata, Japan	Croatia	1–0	1–0	2002 FIFA World Cup
30.	28 February 2007	Qualcomm Stadium, San Diego, United States	Venezuela	3–0	3–0	Friendly
31.	10 June 2007	Giants Stadium, East Rutherford, United States	Honduras	1–0	1–2	2007 CONCACAF Gold Cup
32.	8 July 2007	Estadio Monumental de Maturín, Maturín, Venezuela	Paraguay	5–0	6–0	2007 Copa América
33.	14 July 2007	Estadio Olímpico, Caracas, Venezuela	Uruguay	1–1	3–1	2007 Copa América
34.	6 June 2009	Estadio Cuscatlán, San Salvador, El Salvador	El Salvador	1–1	1–2	2010 FIFA World Cup qualifier
35.	9 September 2009	Estadio Azteca, Mexico City, Mexico	Honduras	1–0	1–0	2010 FIFA World Cup qualifier
36.	10 October 2009	Estadio Azteca, Mexico City, Mexico	El Salvador	2–0	4–1	2010 FIFA World Cup qualifier
37.	17 March 2010	Estadio Corona, Torreón, Mexico	North Korea	1–0	2–1	Friendly
38.	17 June 2010	Peter Mokaba Stadium, Polokwane, South Africa	France	2–0	2–0	2010 FIFA World Cup

=== Filmography ===
Films
Year	Title	Role
1998	Gotita de amor	Himself
2007	La familia P. Luche	Himself
2010	Hasta que el dinero nos separe	Himself
2010-11	Triunfo del amor	Juan José Martínez

Commercials
Year	Title	Role	Notes
2009	Y tú qué sientes por ella?	Himself	Adidas commercial
2010	Más Color	Himself	Laundry detergent of Henkel; Commercial with Consuelo Duval
2011	Pepsi	Himself	Commercial of his Special Edition product
2014	Pepsi	Himself	Commercial with Francisco Palencia & Luis Hernández

== Political career ==
=== Municipal president of Cuernavaca (2015–2018) ===
In January 2015, Blanco registered as a Social Democratic Party (PSD) candidate for the municipal presidential elections of the city of Cuernavaca, the capital of the Mexican state of Morelos, and was formally nominated two months later. In the 2015 state election, he won in a closely contested election, narrowly defeating Maricela Velázquez of the incumbent Institutional Revolutionary Party (PRI). In a subsequent vote recount Blanco was confirmed the winner of the municipal presidential race.

As municipal president, Blanco struggled with accusations about his residency in the city, allegations that he had accepted a bribe to run for office, and even murder. None of these allegations ever went anywhere. In June 2016, he left the Social Democratic Party and dismissed the secretary of the city council, Roberto Yáñez Moreno, which marked the beginning of a dispute between Blanco and the party.

In March 2017, he joined the Social Encounter Party (PES).

=== Governor of Morelos (2018–2024) ===
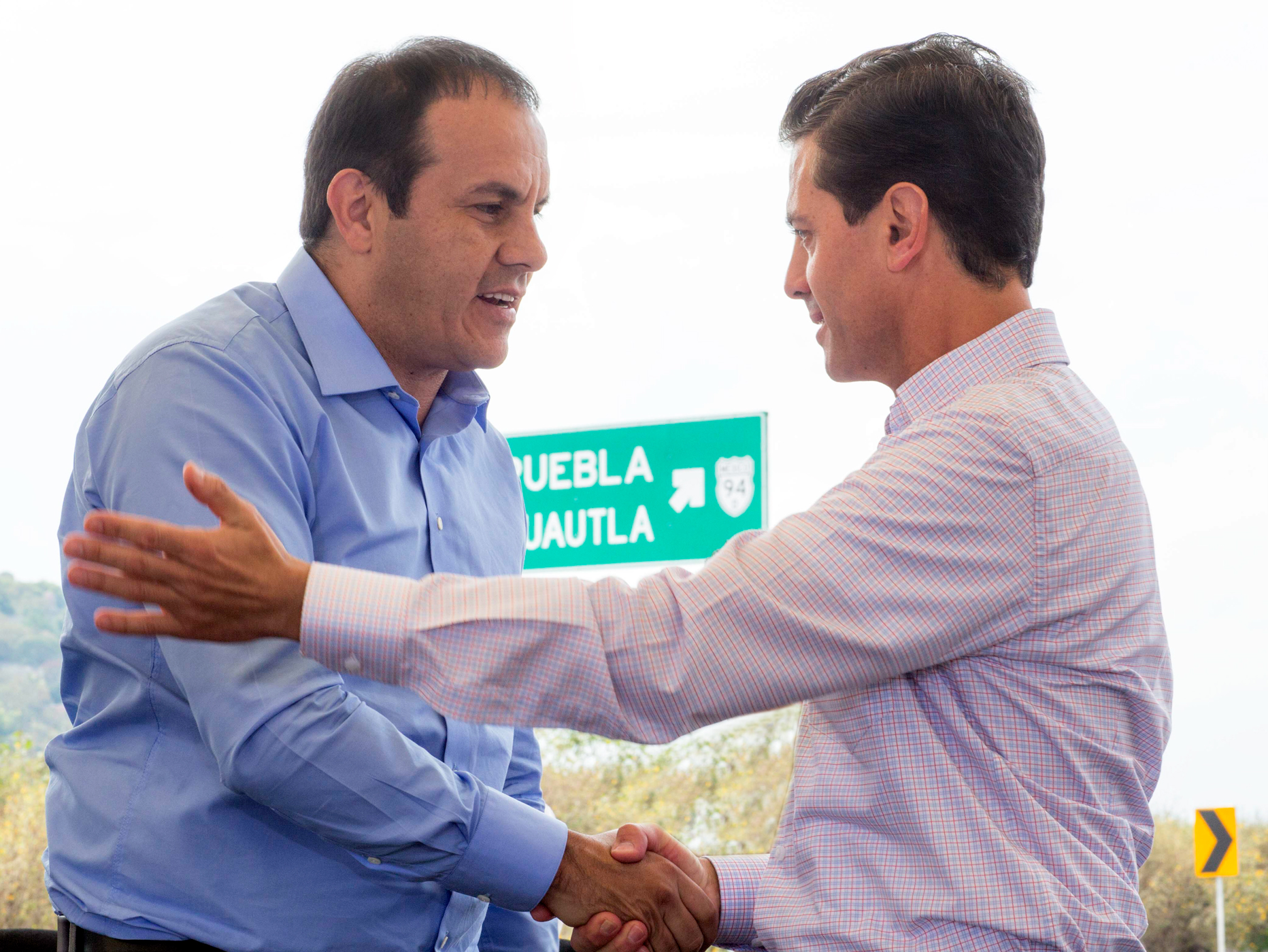
Blanco shaking hands with Enrique Peña Nieto, December 2018

For the 2018 general elections, the National Regeneration Movement proposed having Senator Rabindranath Salazar Solorio as the Juntos Haremos Historia coalition candidate for governor of Morelos but the PES, also part of the coalition, argued Blanco was the better choice. In December 2015, it was determined there would be an internal election to see who would become the candidate for the coalition.

On 28 January 2018, Juntos Haremos Historia presidential candidate Andrés Manuel López Obrador announced Blanco would be the coalition's candidate after winning the nominee process against Senator Rabindranath Salazar Solorio. On 11 March 2018 he formally registered to become the candidate for governor of Morelos and, on 2 April 2018, he resigned as municipal president of Cuernavaca in order to formally participate in the gubernatorial elections; he was succeeded as mayor by Denisse Arizmendi Villegas. Polls indicated he was in the lead.

On 1 July 2018, he won the 2018 gubernatorial elections by a landslide, becoming the first former footballer to win a gubernatorial election in Mexico. He began his term as Governor on 1 October 2018. His greatest challenges as governor were finding adequate funding for the state university (UAEM) and resolving the high incidence of crime in the state. Only three months into his term, he was already faced with marches denouncing his administration. On 13 February 2019 Blanco formally charged his predecessor, Graco Ramírez, with organized crime, operations with resources of illicit origin, and tax fraud.

One year into his governorship, people began to doubt Blanco's administration. Politically, he disputed with Morena and PT, partners in Juntos Haremos Historia that got him elected. He promoted the PES, which had been dissolved on a national level but remained strong locally. Crime rose significantly, with a 680% increase in cases of extortion, 375% increase in kidnappings, and 41% increase in murders. More than eighty women were killed in 2019, with 22 of the cases classified distinctly as femicide. Additionally, a tax debt of MXN$302,230 (US$15,800) from his time as a footballer was pardoned by the federal Tax Administration Service, raising questions of corruption. Roberto Soto Pastor, a former collaborator of Graco Ramírez, sued Blanco for hiring several members of his family and friends, including his half-brother Ulises Bravo, sister-in-law Liu León Luna, uncles Carlos Juárez López, Jaime Juárez López, and Armando Shajid Bravo López, and a close friend named Baltazar Jonathan Alegría Mejía. All received salaries ranging from MXN $45,000 to $60,000 (US$2,300 to $3,100) per month. The suit said their hiring was a violation of article 276 of the Morelos Penal Code, which prohibits nepotism. President Andrés Manuel López Obrador personally called Blanco out for nepotism in a meeting on 11 October. The governor denied allegations of nepotism.

On 8 January 2020, Arias Consultores released a poll that ranked the country's governors from best to worst. Sinaloa governor Quirino Ordaz Coppel was chosen the best, while Puebla governor Miguel Barbosa Huerta was declared the worst. Cuauhtémoc Blanco was second-to-last at No. 31.

=== Federal deputy (2024–present) ===
In the 2024 general election, Blanco was elected to the Chamber of Deputies as a plurinominal deputy for the National Regeneration Movement (Morena).

== Personal life ==
He was previously married to Marisela Santoyo from 1996 to 2003, with whom he has a son, Cuauhtémoc Jr., born the same year of their wedding. After their separation in 2000, Blanco had an affair with Liliana Lago, which produced a daughter, Bárbara, born in 2002. In 2015, Blanco married Natalia Rezende. The couple have a son named Roberto, born in 2016.

He appeared on the North American front cover of the FIFA 10 video game along with Frank Lampard and Sacha Kljestan.

In October 2024, Blanco was accused of attempting to rape his half-sister.

== Honours ==
América

- Mexican Primera División: Clausura 2005
- Campeón de Campeones: 2005
- InterLiga: 2004, 2007
- Copa Pachuca: 1995, 1997
- CONCACAF Champions' Cup: 1992, 2006, 2015–16
- Selectivo Pre Pre Libertadores: 1999
- Copa Pre Libertadores: 1998, 1999
- FIFA Club World Cup fourth place: 2006, 2016

Necaxa

- Mexican Primera División: Invierno 1998
- CONCACAF Cup Winners Cup Finalist: 1997

Irapuato

- Liga de Ascenso: Clausura 2011
- Campeón de Ascenso runner-up: 2011

Dorados

- Ascenso MX runner-up: Apertura 2012
- Copa MX: Apertura 2012

Puebla

- Copa MX: Clausura 2015
- Supercopa MX: 2015

Mexico

- FIFA Confederations Cup: 1999; third place: 1995
- Copa América runner-up: 2001; third place: 1997, 1999, 2007
- CONCACAF Gold Cup: 1996, 1998, 2003
- Pan American Games Silver Medal: 1995
- CONCACAF Pre-Olympic Tournament: 1996

Individual

- FIFA Confederations Cup Silver Boot: 1999
- FIFA Confederations Cup Silver Ball: 1999
- CONCACAF Pre-Olympic Tournament Silver Boot: 1996
- CONCACAF Gold Cup Best XI: 1998
- Mexican Primera División Golden Boot: Invierno 1998
- Mexican Primera División Best Forward: Invierno 1998, Apertura 2005
- Mexican Primera División Golden Ball: Invierno 1998, 2004–05, 2006–07
- Chicago Fire Team MVP: 2007
- MLS Goal of the Year Award: 2007
- MLS Player of the Month: May 2008
- MLS Best XI: 2008
- MLS All-Star: 2008, 2009
- MLS All-Star Game MVP: 2008
- Tecate Premios Deportes Male Athlete of the Year: 2008
- Tecate Premios Deportes North American Footballer of the Year: 2008
- Tecate Premios Deportes Best XI: 2008
- Tecate Premios Deportes Footballer of the Year: 2009
- Premio Nacional del Deporte: 2009
- Club América Historic Player: 2016
- Club América Balón de Oro: 2020
- IFFHS Men's All Time Mexico Dream Team
- FIFA International Football Hall of Fame: 2023

Records

- FIFA Confederations Cup All Time Top Scorer: 9 goals (shared with Ronaldinho)
- Most Liga MX Citalli/Golden Ball Awards: 3 (shared with Cabinho & Fabián Estay)
- Club América Second All Time Top Scorer: 153 goals

== See also ==
- List of footballers with 100 or more international caps
- Retired numbers in association football
- List of Mexico international footballers
- Mexico at the FIFA World Cup
- Mexico at the Copa América
- Mexico at the CONCACAF Gold Cup

Sporting positions
Preceded by Chris Armas	Chicago Fire; Captain; 2008	Succeeded by C. J. Brown
