= Primera División de México Apertura 2008 Liguilla =

The Primera División de México Apertura 2008 Liguilla (Spanish for "little league") will have the teams play two games against each other on a home-and-away basis. The winner of each match up will be determined by aggregate score. the higher seeded team will advance if the aggregate is a tie. The exception for tie-breaking procedure is the finals, where the higher seeded team rule will not be used. If the teams remained tied after 90 minutes of play during the 2nd leg of the finals, extra time will be used, followed by a penalty shootout if necessary. The teams will be seeded 1 to 8 (depending on their position at the end of the regular season). Higher seeded teams play on their home field during the second leg.

Kickoffs are given in local time.

== Bracket ==
Quarterfinals
1	San Luis	1	1	2
8	Santos Laguna	3	2	5
2	Toluca	0	2	2
7	U.A.G.	0	0	0
4	U.N.A.M.	0	1	1
5	Cruz Azul	0	3	3
3	Atlante F.C.	1	1	2
6	U.A.N.L.	1	1	2

Semifinals
8	Santos Laguna	0	1	1
2	Toluca	0	2	2
5	Cruz Azul	3	1	4
3	Atlante F.C.	1	1	2

Finals
2	Toluca (p)	2	0	2 (7)
5	Cruz Azul	0	2	2 (6)

== Quarter-finals ==
The quarterfinals are scheduled to be played on November 22, 23, 29, and November 30.

Team 1	Agg.	Team 2	1st leg	2nd leg
San Luis (Mexico)	2–5	(Mexico) Santos Laguna	1–2	1–3
UNAM (Mexico)	1–3	(Mexico) Cruz Azul	1–3	0–0
Atlante (Mexico)	2–2	(Mexico) UANL	1–1	1–1
Toluca (Mexico)	2–0	(Mexico) UAG	2–0	0–0

=== First leg ===
22 November 2008
17:00

Cruz Azul	0 – 0	UNAM
	(Report)

Estadio Azul, Mexico City
Referee: José Gabriel Gómez (Mexico)

22 November 2008
19:00

UANL	1 – 1	Atlante
Sánchez 7'	(Report)	Rey 73'

Estadio Universitario, San Nicolás, Nuevo León
Referee: Francisco Chacón Mexico)

23 November 2008
15:00

UAG	0 – 0	Toluca
	(Report)

Estadio Tres de Marzo, Zapopan, Jalisco
Referee: José Alfredo Peñaloza (Mexico)

23 November 2008
17:00

Santos Laguna	3 – 1	San Luis
Mascorro 16' (o.g.); Ludueña 33'; Vuoso 78'	(Report)	Piríz 44'

Estadio Corona, Torreón, Coahuila
Referee: Manuel Ernesto Glower (Mexico)

=== Second leg ===
29 November 2008
19:00

San Luis	1 – 2	Santos Laguna
Patiño 16'	(Report)	Blanco 82' (pen.); Ludueña 86'

Estadio Alfonso Lastras, San Luis Potosí, San Luis Potosí
Referee: Marco Antonio Rodríguez (Mexico)

Santos Laguna won 5–2 on aggregate.

29 November 2008
21:00

Atlante	1 – 1	UANL
Pereyra 45'	(Report)	Muñoz 73' (o.g.)

Estadio Quintana Roo, Cancún, Quintana Roo
Referee: Paúl Enrique Delgadillo (Mexico)

Atlante won 2–2 on aggregate.

30 November 2008
12:00

Toluca	2 – 0	UAG
Mancilla 59'; Nava 84'	(Report)

Estadio Nemesio Díez, Toluca, Mexico State
Referee: Roberto García (México)

Toluca won 2–0 on aggregate

30 November 2008
17:00

UNAM	1 – 3	Cruz Azul
Palencia 4'	(Report)	Torrado 6'; Sabah 58'; Villaluz 67'

Estadio Olímpico Universitario, Mexico City
Referee: Armando Benito Archundia (México)

Cruz Azul won 3-1 on aggregate.

== Semi-finals ==
The semifinals are scheduled to be played on December 3, 4, 6, and 7.

Team 1	Agg.	Team 2	1st leg	2nd leg
Toluca (Mexico)	2 – 1	(Mexico) Santos Laguna	2 – 1	0 – 0
Atlante F.C. (Mexico)	2 – 4	(Mexico) Cruz Azul	1 – 1	1 – 3

=== First leg ===
3 December 2008
21:00

Cruz Azul	3 – 1	Atlante F.C.
Sabah 9' (pen.); Lugo 22'; Lozano 80'	(Report)	Rey 31'

Estadio Azul, Mexico City
Referee: Francisco Chacón (Mexico)

4 December 2008
19:00

Santos Laguna	0 – 0	Toluca
	(Report)

Estadio Corona, Torreón, Coahuila
Referee: José Alfredo Peñaloza (Mexico)

=== Second leg ===
6 December 2008
19:00

Atlante F.C.	1 – 1	Cruz Azul
Maldonado 8'	(Report)	Villaluz 4'

Estadio Quintana Roo, Cancún, Quintana Roo
Referee: Roberto García Orozco (Mexico)

Cruz Azul won 4–2 on aggregate.

7 December 2008
12:00

Toluca	2 – 1	Santos Laguna
Dueñas 27'; Mancilla 41'	(Report)	Castillo 26'

Estadio Nemesio Díez, Toluca, Mexico State
Referee: Paúl Enrique Delgadillo (Mexico)

Toluca won 2–1 on aggregate.

== Final ==
The first and second legs of the final are scheduled to be played on December 11 and 14, respectively.

=== First leg ===
11 December 2008
20:00

Cruz Azul	0 – 2	Toluca
	(Report)	da Silva 14'; Ponce 21'

Estadio Azul, Mexico City
Referee: Paúl Enrique Delgadillo (Mexico)

=== Second leg ===
14 December 2008
12:00

Toluca	0 – 2 (a.e.t.)	Cruz Azul
	(Report)	Vela 49'; Domínguez 77'
Penalties
López (penalty scored); Zinha (penalty scored); D. De la Torre (penalty scored); Esquivel (penalty scored); Mancilla (penalty scored); Dueñas (penalty scored); Almazán (penalty scored)	7 – 6	(penalty scored) Lozano; (penalty scored) Sabah; (penalty scored) Torrado; (penalty scored) Beltrán; (penalty scored) Zeballos; (penalty scored) Lugo; (penalty missed) Vela

Estadio Nemesio Díez, Toluca, Mexico State
Attendance: 23,000
Referee: Roberto García (Mexico)
