= Marisela Morales =

Marisela Morales may refer to:

- Marisela Morales, Mexican neuroscientist
- Marisela Morales (born 1970), Mexican lawyer
