= Marisela Morales (neuroscientist) =

Mexican neuroscientist

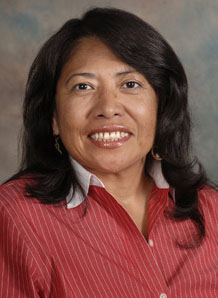
- Morales in 2017
- Education: Instituto Politécnico Nacional; Universidad de Guanajuato
- Awards: PECASE (2004)
- Scientific career
- Fields: Neuroscience
- Workplaces: National Institute on Drug Abuse

Marisela Morales is a Mexican neuroscientist specializing in the neurobiology of drug addiction. She is a senior investigator at the National Institute on Drug Abuse.

== Education ==
Morales completed a B.S. in biochemistry and microbiology at the Instituto Politécnico Nacional. She earned a M.S. and Ph.D. in biochemistry and cell biology at Universidad de Guanajuato Institute of Experimental Biology. Morales was a postdoctoral researcher at the University of Colorado Boulder under Eva Fifková and Scripps Research under Floyd E. Bloom.

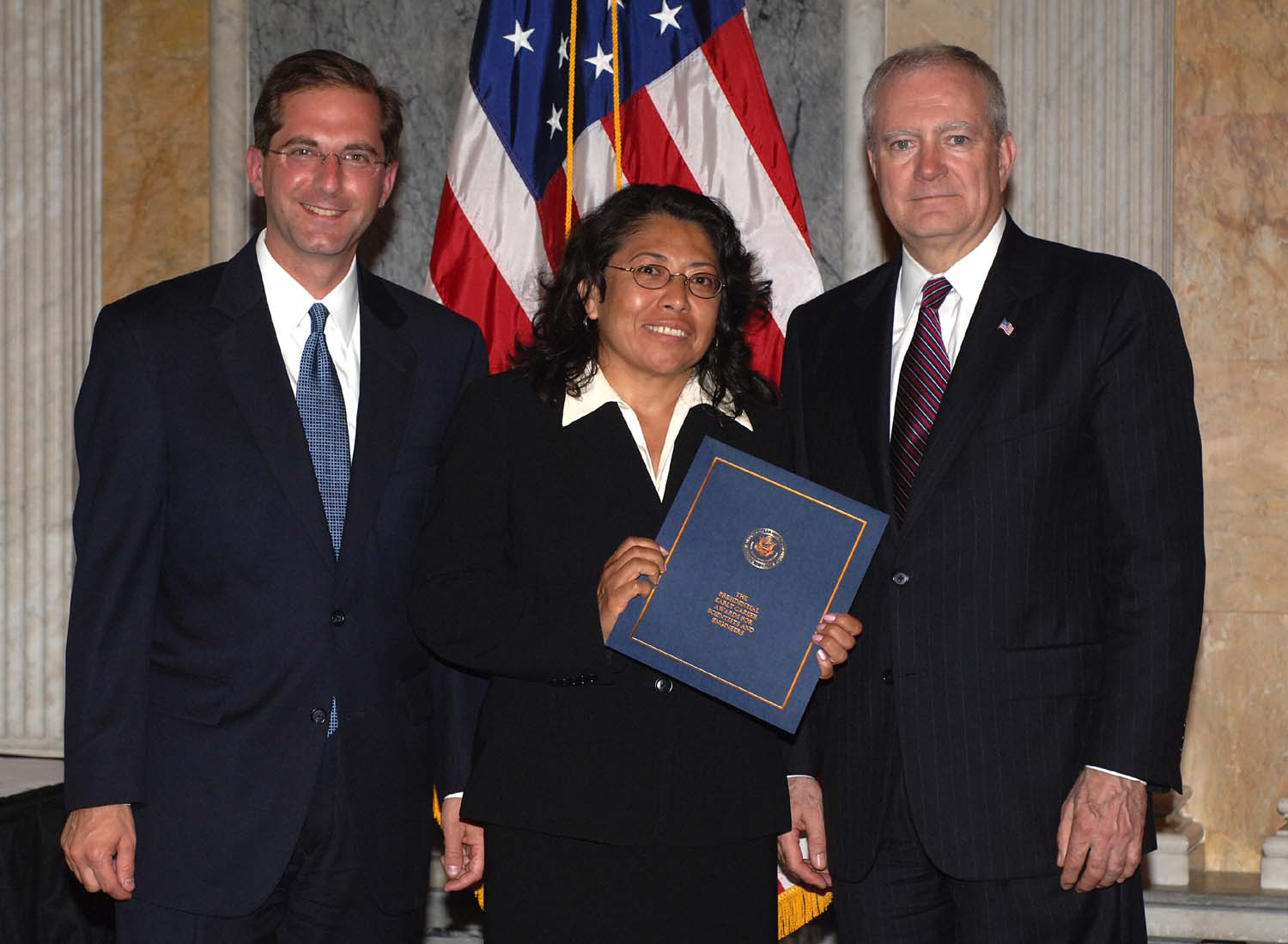
Alex Azar and Morales at the PECASE 2004 ceremony

== Career ==
In 2004, she won a Presidential Early Career Award for Scientists and Engineers for her research using a combination of molecular biology and high-resolution microscopy to identify and study brain neuronal networks that participate in the biology of various drugs of abuse.

Morales is a senior investigator at the National Institute on Drug Abuse. She works in the neuronal networks section in the integrative neuroscience research branch.

=== Research ===
Morales investigates the molecules, cells and neuronal pathways central to the neurobiology of drug addiction. She applies anatomical, cell molecular, cell biological and electrophysiological experimental approaches. Her laboratory's research focus on two issues: what is the brain circuitry through which addictive drugs have their habit-forming actions, and what are the neuroadaptations in this circuitry that accompany the transition from recreational to compulsive drug-taking?

Morales investigates the neuronal properties and synaptic connectivity of the ventral tegmental area (VTA) to gain a better understanding of the interactions of the VTA with other brain structures in the processing and integration of information underlying behaviors associated with the neurobiology of drugs of addiction. Her laboratory has shown that glutamatergic neurons are also present in the VTA. Morales explores the neuronal connectivity of VTA glutamatergic neurons and their participation in animal behavior. Her laboratory has found evidence indicating synaptic connectivity between the reward and the stress systems at the level of the VTA.
