= England–Republic of Ireland football rivalry =

International football rivalry

- Location: British Isles
- Teams: England; Republic of Ireland
- First meeting: 30 September 1946; Friendly; Republic of Ireland 0–1 England
- Latest meeting: 17 November 2024; UEFA Nations League; England 5–0 Republic of Ireland

Statistics
- Total meetings: 18
- Most wins: England (8)
- Most player appearances: (England) Bryan Robson (England) Gary Lineker (Republic of Ireland) Pat Bonner (Republic of Ireland) Paul McGrath (Republic of Ireland) David O'Leary (5 appearances each)
- Top scorer: (England) John Atyeo (England) Tommy Taylor (3 goals each)
- All-time record: England: 8 Draw: 8 Republic of Ireland: 2

The England–Republic of Ireland football rivalry is a rivalry between England and Republic of Ireland football teams. The first ever match was played on 30 September 1946 at Dalymount Park, Dublin. England won the match 1–0. On 21 September 1949, Republic of Ireland won the second match 2–0 which was played at Goodison Park, Liverpool and became the first non-British team to defeat England on their home soil.

Since then there have a been a total of 18 matches between both the teams with England winning eight, Republic of Ireland winning two, and eight games ending in a draw.

The teams were drawn together in the 2024–25 UEFA Nations League, where they faced each other home and away in their first competitive fixtures for 33 years.

== History ==
England and Ireland has a long-standing rivalry, stretching back to Anglo-Norman invasion of Ireland, when settlers started to control Irish affairs, British colonising the Irish Island and displacing the locals and with the Plantation of Ulster, the Catholic (local) majority was under the control of the Protestant minority settlers. After the Irish War of Independence, the British divided Ireland into two self-governing polities; which later became Northern Ireland and the Republic of Ireland. The split caused animosity between England and the Republic of Ireland which can be often seen when the countries meet in any sporting events.

Within football, England and Ireland began playing against one another regularly from the early 1880s, but this was the Ireland team organised by the Irish Football Association based in Belfast which favoured Ulster Protestant players; as participants in the British Home Championship, their relationship with England was fraternal. That Ireland team eventually evolved into the current Northern Ireland national football team, whereas the Republic of Ireland national football team formed in 1921 by the Football Association of Ireland in Dublin had no such sporting familiarity with England (although it was always the case that the majority of the best Irish players were based there) and clear differences in cultural and political leanings amongst their supporters.

The rivalry is further intensified when players of Irish descent switch allegiances to England, with Declan Rice and Jack Grealish being the latest examples, as both represented Republic of Ireland from U16 to U21 levels, then switched to England at senior level. Rice made three appearances for the Republic of Ireland before joining England. There have also been many more English-born players to have played for Ireland, some of whom also played for England at youth level.

Media sources describe this rivalry as being taken more seriously by Ireland than England.

== List of matches ==
Key
Republic of Ireland win
England win
Draw
Match abandoned

No.	Date	Location	Competition	Home team	Result	Away team
1.	30 September 1946	(Republic of Ireland) Dublin	Friendly	Republic of Ireland	0–1	England
2.	21 September 1949	(England) Liverpool	Friendly	England	0–2	Republic of Ireland
3.	8 May 1957	(England) London	1958 FIFA World Cup qualification	England	5–1	Republic of Ireland
4.	19 May 1957	(Republic of Ireland) Dublin	1958 FIFA World Cup qualification	Republic of Ireland	1–1	England
5.	24 May 1964	(Republic of Ireland) Dublin	Friendly	Republic of Ireland	1–3	England
6.	8 September 1976	(England) London	Friendly	England	1–1	Republic of Ireland
7.	25 October 1978	(Republic of Ireland) Dublin	UEFA Euro 1980 qualifying	Republic of Ireland	1–1	England
8.	6 February 1980	(England) London	UEFA Euro 1980 qualifying	England	2–0	Republic of Ireland
9.	26 March 1985	(England) London	Friendly	England	2–1	Republic of Ireland
10.	12 June 1988	(West Germany) Stuttgart	UEFA Euro 1988	England	0–1	Republic of Ireland
11.	11 June 1990	(Italy) Cagliari	1990 FIFA World Cup	England	1–1	Republic of Ireland
12.	14 November 1990	(Republic of Ireland) Dublin	UEFA Euro 1992 qualifying	Republic of Ireland	1–1	England
13.	27 March 1991	(England) London	UEFA Euro 1992 qualifying	England	1–1	Republic of Ireland
–	15 February 1995	(Republic of Ireland) Dublin	Friendly	Republic of Ireland	1–0 (Note: Match was abandoned after 27 minutes due to the Lansdowne Road football riot. The result was declared void but players were still credited with international caps.)	England
14.	29 May 2013	(England) London	Friendly	England	1–1	Republic of Ireland
15.	7 June 2015	(Republic of Ireland) Dublin	Friendly	Republic of Ireland	0–0	England
16.	12 November 2020	(England) London	Friendly	England	3–0	Republic of Ireland
17.	7 September 2024	(Republic of Ireland) Dublin	2024–25 UEFA Nations League	Republic of Ireland	0–2	England
18.	17 November 2024	(England) London	2024–25 UEFA Nations League	England	5–0	Republic of Ireland

== Statistics ==
=== All-time top goalscorers ===
Nation	Player	Goals	Years
(England)	John Atyeo	3	1955–57
(England)	Tommy Taylor	3	1953–57
(England)	Gary Lineker	2	1984–92
(England)	Kevin Keegan	2	1972–82

=== All-time most appearances ===
Nation	Player	Appearances	Years	Position
(England)	Bryan Robson	5	1980–1991	Midfielder
(England)	Gary Lineker	5	1984–1992	Forward
(Republic of Ireland)	Pat Bonner	5	1981–1996	Goalkeeper
(Republic of Ireland)	Paul McGrath	5	1985–1997	Defender
(Republic of Ireland)	David O'Leary	5	1976–1993	Defender

=== Overall ===
Competition	Matches	Wins		Draws	Goals	
Competition	Matches	England	Rep. of Ireland	Draws	England	Rep. of Ireland
FIFA World Cup	1	0	0	1	1	1
FIFA World Cup qualification	2	1	0	1	6	2
UEFA European Championship	1	0	1	0	0	1
UEFA Euro qualification	4	1	0	3	5	3
UEFA Nations League	2	2	0	0	7	0
All competitions	10	4	1	5	19	7
Friendlies	8	4	1	3	11	6
All matches	18	8	2	8	30	13
