= Maricela Velázquez =

Mexican politician

Maricela Velázquez Sánchez
- Born: 2 October 1982 (age 43); Cuernavaca, Morelos, Mexico
- Occupation: Deputy
- Political party: PRI

Maricela Velázquez Sánchez (born 2 October 1982) is a Mexican politician affiliated with the PRI. As of 2013 she served as Deputy of the LXII Legislature of the Mexican Congress representing Morelos.

In June 2015 Velázquez has participated as a candidate in the municipal presidential elections for the city of Cuernavaca, the capital of the Mexican state of Morelos. She was narrowly defeated in the race by the former footballer Cuauhtémoc Blanco.
