= Alejandro Domínguez (Mexican footballer) =

Mexican footballer and manager (born 1961)

Personal information
- Full name: Alejandro Domínguez Escoto
- Date of birth: 9 February 1961 (age 65)
- Place of birth: Mexico City, Mexico
- Height: 1.75 m (5 ft 9 in)
- Position: Midfielder

Team information
- Current team: Pachuca (assistant)

Senior career*
Years	Team	Apps	(Gls)
1982–1994	América	218	(11)
1994–1995	Tampico Madero	29	(2)
1995–1996	Querétaro	0	(0)
Total		247	(13)

International career
1983–1986	Mexico	19	(2)

Managerial career
- 1996–2000: América (assistant)
- 2002: Puebla (assistant)
- 2002: Puebla (interim)
- 2003: Motagua
- 2004: Olimpia
- 2005: Delfines de Coatzacoalcos
- 2006–2007: Veracruz (assistant)
- 2007–2011: América (assistant)
- 2012–2013: Pachuca (assistant)
- 2013–2014: Marina
- 2015–2016: Cafetaleros de Tapachula (assistant)
- 2016–2017: Dorados de Sinaloa (assistant)
- 2017–2018: Cafetaleros de Tapachula (assistant)
- 2018–2019: Juárez (assistant)
- 2020: Toluca (assistant)
- 2021–2022: Club Tijuana (assistant)
- 2022–2025: Querétaro (assistant)
- 2026–: Pachuca (assistant)
- * Club domestic league appearances and goals

Alejandro Domínguez Escoto (born 9 February 1961) is a Mexican former professional footballer and manager.

== Playing career ==
=== Club ===
He also played for Club América.

=== International ===
He represented Mexico at the 1986 FIFA World Cup.

== Managerial career ==
After he retired from playing, Domínguez became a coach. He made his managerial debut with Puebla in 2002 and was an interim manager with Veracruz for three matches during 2007. He was an assistant manager for his former club, América, during 2010.
