= Rafael Amador =

Mexican footballer (1959-2018)

Personal information
- Full name: Rafael Amador Flores
- Date of birth: 16 November 1959
- Place of birth: Tlaxcala, Mexico
- Date of death: 31 July 2018 (aged 58)
- Place of death: Puebla, Mexico
- Height: 1.80 m (5 ft 11 in)
- Position: Defender

Senior career*
Years	Team	Apps	(Gls)
1979–1987	UNAM	205	(1)
1987–1988	Puebla	18	(0)
Total		223	(1)

International career
1983–1986	Mexico	30	(0)

Managerial career
- 1999–2000: UNAM
- * Club domestic league appearances and goals

Rafael Amador Flores (16 November 1959 – 31 July 2018) was a Mexican professional footballer who played as a defender. He played for Mexico in the 1986 FIFA World Cup. He also played and managed Liga MX side Club Universidad Nacional.

After he retired from playing, Amador managed Pumas. He died at age 58 from cancer.
