= Mario Trejo (footballer, born 1956) =

Mexican footballer

Personal information
- Full name: Mario Alberto Trejo Guzmán
- Date of birth: 11 February 1956 (age 70)
- Place of birth: Mexico City, Mexico
- Height: 1.71 m (5 ft 7 1/2 in)
- Position: Defender

Senior career*
Years	Team	Apps	(Gls)
1975–1986	Club América	233	(21)
1986–1990	Tampico Madero	91	(11)
Total		324	(32)

International career
1980–1986	Mexico	53	(1)

Managerial career
- 2007: Delfines de Los Cabos F.C.
- 2009: Linces de Oaxaca
- 2011–2012: Unión de Curtidores
- 2012–2014: Cañoneros de Campeche
- 2014–2015: Topos de Reynosa FC
- 2017: Albinegros de Orizaba
- 2017–2018: América Academy
- 2018: América Premier
- 2019–2020: América Academy
- * Club domestic league appearances and goals

Mario Alberto Trejo Guzmán (born 11 February 1956) is a Mexican former professional footballer. He played for Mexico in the 1986 FIFA World Cup.
