= Manuel Negrete (footballer) =

Mexican footballer and manager (born 1959)

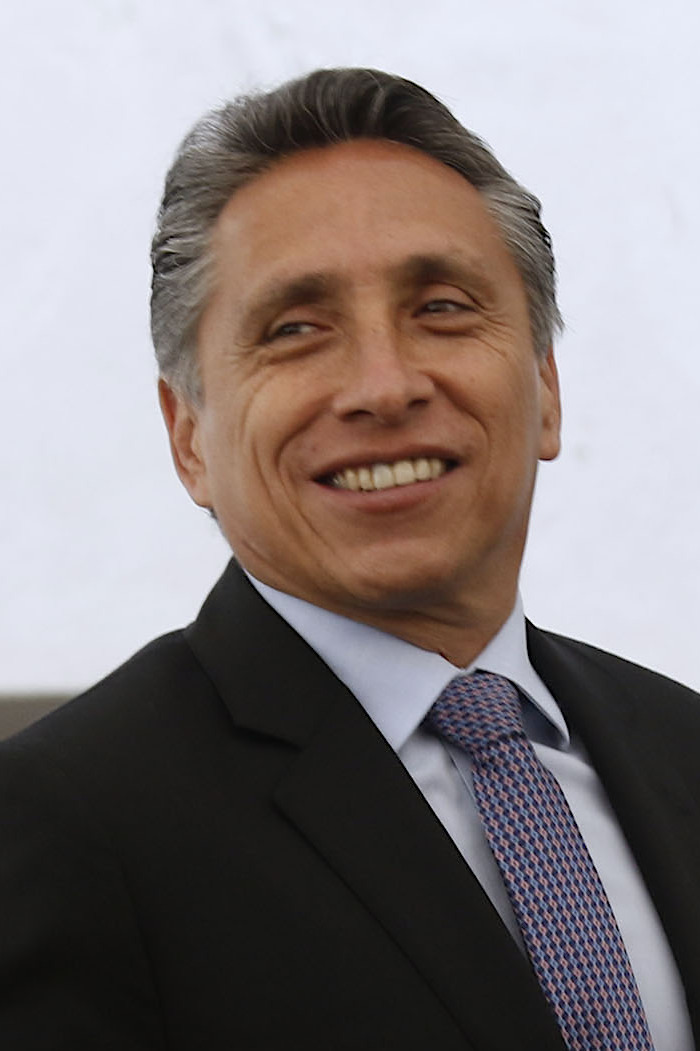
- Negrete in 2019

Personal information
- Full name: Manuel Negrete Arias
- Date of birth: 11 March 1959 (age 67)
- Place of birth: Ciudad Altamirano, Guerrero, Mexico
- Position: Midfielder

Senior career*
Years	Team	Apps	(Gls)
1979–1986	Pumas	215	(53)
1986	Sporting CP	15	(3)
1987	Sporting Gijón	4	(1)
1987–1990	Pumas	117	(39)
1990–1991	Monterrey	27	(0)
1991–1992	Pumas	38	(11)
1992–1993	Atlante	24	(3)
1993–1994	Toros Neza	19	(3)
1994–1995	Acapulco	?	(?)
1995–1996	Atlante	6	(0)

International career
1981–1990	Mexico	57	(12)

Managerial career
- 2004–2005: Atlante UTN
- Pumas (youth)
- 2008: León
- * Club domestic league appearances and goals

Manuel Negrete Arias (born 11 March 1959) is a Mexican former professional footballer and manager, who played as a midfielder.

== Club career ==
Negrete became a professional football player in 1980 with Pumas. His style of play gave him instant recognition among Mexican soccer fans, with Negrete becoming a household name quickly. After the 1986 World Cup, Negrete continued playing in the Mexican Football League, and then reached the European soccer leagues by joining Sporting CP in Portugal and then moving to Sporting Gijón in Spain.

== International career ==
At the 1986 FIFA World Cup, Negrete participated in five games and scored one goal in the round of 16 against Bulgaria in the 35th minute, the first of a 2–0 win. The goal has been described as one of the most spectacular in World Cup history by many football fans and journalists which, in April 2018, voted it in FIFA's website as the World Cup's greatest goal. Negrete received a high ball outside the penalty area, controlled it, let the ball bounce once on the ground and combined with Javier Aguirre; the latter returned the ball on the first touch, while keeping it on the air, and Negrete shot it on a scissor kick into the bottom right corner of goalkeeper Borislav Mihaylov.

== Career statistics ==
=== International goals ===
#	Date	Venue	Opponent	Score	Result	Competition
1.	August 16, 1984	Helsinki Olympic Stadium, Helsinki, Finland	Finland	3–0	3–0	Friendly
2.	March 1, 1984	Puskás Ferenc Stadion, Budapest, Hungary	Hungary	1–0	2–0	Friendly
3.	September 18, 1984	Estadio Universitario, San Nicolás, Mexico	Argentina	1–1	1–1	Friendly
4.	November 11, 1984	National Stadium, Port of Spain, Trinidad and Tobago	Trinidad and Tobago	1–0	2–0	Friendly
5.	February 5, 1985	Estadio La Corregidora, Querétaro, Mexico	Poland	2–0	5–0	Friendly
6.	February 5, 1985	Estadio La Corregidora, Querétaro, Mexico	Poland	5–0	5–0	Friendly
7.	June 15, 1985	Estadio Azteca, Mexico City, Mexico	West Germany	1–0	2–0	Azteca Cup
8.	October 11, 1985	March 28 Stadium, Benghazi, Libya	Libya	1–1	1–3	Friendly
9.	December 7, 1985	Estadio Azteca, Mexico City, Mexico	Algeria	1–0	2–0	1985 Mexico Cup
10.	March 6, 1986	Los Angeles Memorial Coliseum, Los Angeles, United States	Denmark	1–0	1–1	Friendly
11.	June 15, 1986	Estadio Azteca, Mexico City, Mexico	Bulgaria	1–0	2–0	1986 FIFA World Cup
12.	February 21, 1989	Los Angeles Memorial Coliseum, Los Angeles, United States	Guatemala	1–0	2–1	1989 Friendship Cup

== Post-playing career ==
Negrete has led a more quiet life in Mexico since he retired from playing. He worked as coach of the Pumas youth teams, and later went to Club León as an assistant coach. He became head coach after the firing/resignation of Mario Alberto Garcia.

== Honours ==
Pumas

- Mexican Primera División: 1980–81
- CONCACAF Champions' Cup: 1980, 1982, 1989
- Copa Interamericana: 1981

Atlante

- Mexican Primera División: 1992–93

Individual

- Mexican Primera División Golden Ball: 1984–85
- South American Player of the Year Nomination: 1986
