= Luis Flores (Mexican footballer) =

Mexican footballer (born 1961)

Personal information
- Full name: Luis Enrique Flores Ocaranza
- Date of birth: 18 July 1961 (age 65)
- Place of birth: Mexico City, Mexico
- Position: Striker

Senior career*
Years	Team	Apps	(Gls)
1979–1986	Pumas UNAM	161	(61)
1986–1987	Sporting Gijón	32	(10)
1987–1988	Pumas UNAM	38	(24)
1988–1989	Valencia	36	(6)
1989–1991	Cruz Azul	50	(20)
1991–1993	Atlas	47	(12)
1993–1995	Guadalajara	7	(0)
Total		371	(133)

International career
1983–1993	Mexico	61	(25)

Managerial career
- 1996–1997: Pumas UNAM
- 2009: Veracruz
Medal record
Representing Mexico
Runner-up	Copa América	1993
- * Club domestic league appearances and goals

Luis Enrique Flores Ocaranza (Spanish pronunciation: [lwis ˈfloɾes]; born 18 July 1961) is a Mexican former professional footballer who played as a striker for Mexico at the 1986 FIFA World Cup.

== Club career ==
Flores debuted with Pumas UNAM in the 1879–80 season. In 1980–81 he was part of the squad that won the league championship. In 1985, he joined Spanish team Sporting Gijón. He made a total of 32 appearances and 10 goals with the Spanish team. The following season, he came back to Mexico with Pumas UNAM, but later was signed again by a new Spanish team Valencia CF. He had a successful season with Valencia appearing 36 times and scoring six goals. He later came back to Mexico with the European experience to play with clubs such as Cruz Azul, Atlas, and Guadalajara.

He was at Sporting while Luis Enrique was in its youth categories, and his nickname Lucho was also given to the player.

== Coaching career ==
Flores has been the manager of Pumas UNAM, C.D. Veracruz, Atlético Celaya and Necaxa.

== Career statistics ==
Scores and results list Mexico's goal tally first, score column indicates score after each Flores goal.

List of international goals scored by Luis Flores
No.	Date	Venue	Opponent	Score	Result	Competition
1 (Note: Luis Flores scored four goals in a match against Martinique in 1983, however, this team is not recognized by FIFA, so their matches are not statistically valid.)	29 November 1983	Fort-de-France, Martinique	Martinique	4–4	4–4	Friendly
2	29 November 1983	Fort-de-France, Martinique	Martinique	4–4	4–4	Friendly
3	29 November 1983	Fort-de-France, Martinique	Martinique	4–4	4–4	Friendly
4	29 November 1983	Fort-de-France, Martinique	Martinique	4–4	4–4	Friendly
5	6 December 1983	Estadio Sergio León Chávez, Irapuato, Mexico	Canada	1–0	5–0	Friendly
6	6 December 1983	Estadio Sergio León Chávez, Irapuato, Mexico	Canada	2–0	5–0	Friendly
7	4 December 1984	Los Angeles Memorial Coliseum, Los Angeles, United States	Ecuador	3–2	3–2	Friendly
8	5 February 1985	Estadio Corregidora, Querétaro, Mexico	Poland	4–0	5–0	Friendly
9	9 June 1985	Estadio Azteca, Mexico City, Mexico	England	1–0	1–0	1985 Mexico City Cup
10	15 June 1985	Estadio Azteca, Mexico City, Mexico	West Germany	2–0	2–0	1985 Mexico City Cup
11	25 August 1985	Los Angeles Memorial Coliseum, Los Angeles, United States	Chile	2–1	2–1	Friendly
12	15 October 1985	Revolution 1962 Stadium, Sana'a, North Yemen	North Yemen	1–0	2–0	Friendly
13	20 October 1985	Nasser Stadium, Cairo, Egypt	Egypt	1–0	1–2	Friendly
14	2 December 1985	Los Angeles Memorial Coliseum, Los Angeles, United States	South Korea	1–1	2–1	Friendly
15	2 December 1985	Los Angeles Memorial Coliseum, Los Angeles, United States	South Korea	2–1	2–1	Friendly
16	15 February 1986	Spartan Stadium, San Jose, United States	East Germany	1–1	1–2	Friendly
17	13 April 1986	Los Angeles Memorial Coliseum, Los Angeles, United States	Uruguay	1–0	1–0	Friendly
18	27 April 1986	Estadio Azulgrana, Mexico City, Mexico	Canada	2–0	3–0	Friendly
19	7 June 1986	Estadio Azteca, Mexico City, Mexico	Paraguay	1–0	1–1	1986 FIFA World Cup
20	2 December 1987	Santa Ana Stadium, Santa Ana, United States	Guyana	1–0	9–0	Friendly
21	13 January 1988	Estadio General Francisco Morazán, San Pedro Sula, Honduras	Honduras	1–0	1–0	Friendly
22	3 February 1988	Estadio Nemesio Díez, Toluca, Mexico	Guatemala	2–0	2–1	Friendly
23	14 February 1988	Estadio Nacional Mateo Flores, Guatemala City, Guatemala	Guatemala	2–0	3–0	Friendly
24	10 May 1990	Swangard Stadium, Burnaby, Canada	United States	1–0	1–0	1990 North American Nations Cup
25	13 May 1990	Swangard Stadium, Burnaby, Canada	Canada	1–1	1–2	1990 North American Nations Cup
26	11 April 1993	Estadio Azteca, Mexico City, Mexico	Honduras	1–0	3–0	1994 FIFA World Cup qualification
27	25 April 1993	Estadio Azteca, Mexico City, Mexico	Canada	3–0	4–0	1994 FIFA World Cup qualification
28	2 May 1993	Estadio Tiburcio Carías Andino, Tegucigalpa, Honduras	Honduras	3–0	4–1	1994 FIFA World Cup qualification
29	10 June 1993	Estadio Azteca, Mexico City, Mexico	Paraguay	3–0	3–1	Friendly

== Honours ==
Pumas UNAM

- Mexican Primera División: 1980–81
- CONCACAF Champions' Cup: 1980, 1982
- Copa Interamericana: 1981

Mexico

- Copa América runner-up: 1993

Individual

- Mexican Primera División Top Scorer: 1987–88
