= Fernando Quirarte =

Mexican footballer and manager (born 1956)

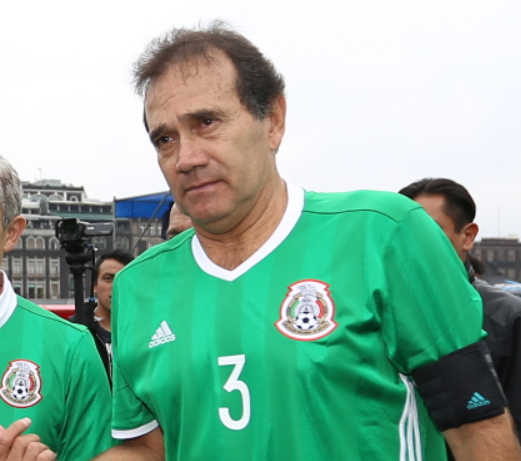
- Quirarte in 2017

Personal information
- Full name: Fernando Quirarte Gutiérrez
- Date of birth: 17 May 1956 (age 70)
- Place of birth: Guadalajara, Mexico
- Height: 1.80 m (5 ft 11 in)
- Position: Centre-back

Senior career*
Years	Team	Apps	(Gls)
1973–1987	Guadalajara	274	(20)
1987–1988	Atlas	31	(3)
1988–1990	UdeG	50	(3)
Total		355	(26)

International career
1981–1988	Mexico	45	(5)

Managerial career
- 1999–2002: Santos Laguna
- 2002–2004: Atlas
- 2004–2006: Chiapas
- 2011–2012: Guadalajara
- * Club domestic league appearances and goals

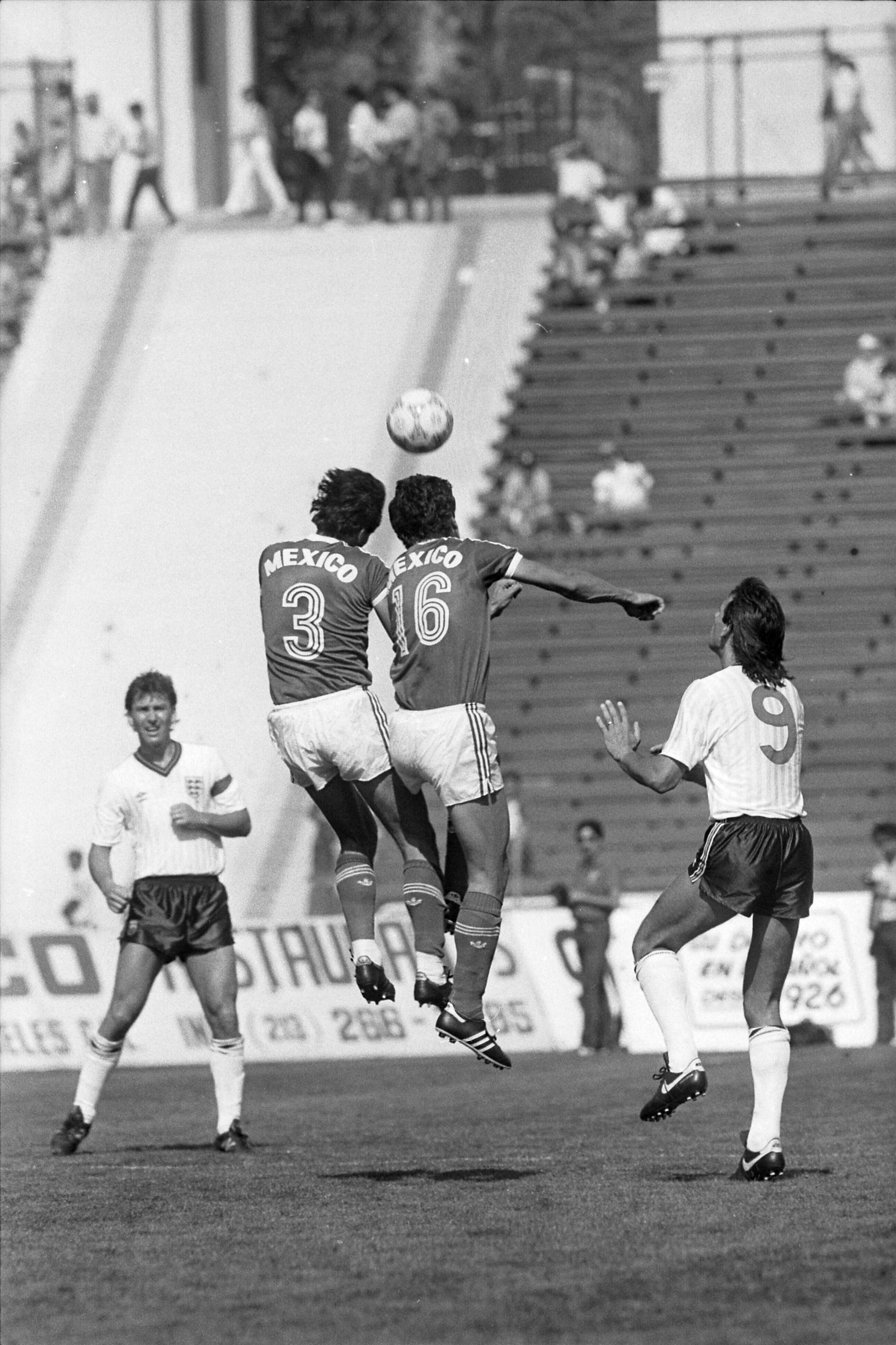
Quirarte (jumping, left) playing for Mexico in 1986

Fernando Quirarte Gutiérrez (born 17 May 1956) is a Mexican former professional footballer and manager.

He played as a centre-back for the club Guadalajara from 1973 to 1987 and the Mexico national team, earning 45 caps and scoring 5 goals, including two in the 1986 FIFA World Cup.

Later he was the coach of Santos Laguna, Atlas, and Jaguares.

On October 4, 2011, Mexican club Chivas of Guadalajara had demoted coach Jose Luis Real and replaced him with Fernando Quirarte. The change came after Chivas lost 1–0 to Querétaro over the weekend, which extended the club's winless run to four in Mexico's Apertura championship.

== Career statistics ==
=== International goals ===
Scores and results list Mexico's goal tally first.

No.	Date	Venue	Opponent	Score	Result	Competition	Ref.
1.	August 11, 1984	Friedrich-Ludwig-Jahn-Sportpark, East Berlin, East Germany	East Germany	1–1	1–1	Friendly	
2.	June 3, 1986	Estadio Azteca, Mexico City, Mexico	Belgium	1–0	2–1	1986 FIFA World Cup	
3.	June 11, 1986	Estadio Azteca, Mexico City, Mexico	Iraq	1–0	1–0	1986 FIFA World Cup	
4.	April 28, 1987	Estadio Nemesio Díez, Toluca, Mexico	Bahamas	9–0	13–0	Friendly	
5.	February 2, 1987	Santa Ana Stadium, Santa Ana, United States	Guyana	?–0	9–0	Friendly	
