= 1994–95 Tecos F.C. season =

Tecos UAG
1994-95 season
- Owner: Leaño Family
- President: Jose Antonio Leaño
- Manager: Victor Manuel Vucetich
- Stadium: 3 de Marzo
- Primera Division: 5th Quarterfinals
- Copa Mexico: Group stage
- Top goalscorer: Borgetti (13 goals)
Home colours	Away colours	Third colours
- All statistics correct as of 27 January 2019.

The 1994–95 Tecos UAG season is the 35th season in the football club's history and the 19th consecutive season in the top flight of Mexican football.

== Summary ==
In summertime, President Jose Antonio Leaño managed to keep the core of players after won its first league included head coach Victor Vucetich (rumours about a contract-to-life with UAG) despite several and lucrative offers to transfer out players. However, Leaño Family did not reinforced the squad in a sign of austerity for upcoming seasons. Incumbent Champions Tecos UAG could not repeat its feature of last campaign and finish the league season on the 5th spot classifying for Championship Playoff only to be defeated by Necaxa and eliminated in quarterfinals.

== Squad ==
Note: Flags indicate national team as defined under FIFA eligibility rules; some limited exceptions apply. Players may hold more than one non-FIFA nationality.

No.	Pos.	Nation	Player
1	GK	MEX	Carlos Briones
—	GK	MEX	Alan Cruz
—	DF	BRA	Marcelo Gonçalves
—	DF	MEX	Mauricio Gomez
7	MF	MEX	Javier Hernandez
4	DF	MEX	José Luis Salgado
—	DF	MEX	Duilio Davino
—	MF	MEX	Guillermo Vázquez
19	MF	MEX	Mauricio Gallaga
8	MF	MEX	Jaime Ordiales
6	MF	MEX	Porfirio Jimenez

No.	Pos.	Nation	Player
24	FW	MEX	Eustacio Rizo
58	FW	BRA	Osmar Donizete
20	FW	BRA	Edson Zwaricz
—	MF	MEX	Roberto Medina
—	FW	URU	Claudio Morena
20	DF	MEX	Hector Vicente Enriquez
—	FW	MEX	Juan Parra
13	MF	MEX	Fernando Guijarro
—	FW	ARG	Jorge Luis Gabrich
—	FW	MEX	Felipe Malibran
—	DF	MEX	Markus Lopez
—	FW	ARG	Samuel Dall'Orso

=== Transfers ===
In
Pos.	Name	from	Type
DF	Markus Lopez	Queretaro	
FW	Samuel Dall'Orso	Queretaro	
FW	Hugo Aparecido	Tigres UANL	

Out
Pos.	Name	To	Type
MF	Guillermo Vázquez	Toros Neza	
MF	Roberto Medina	CF Monterrey	

==== Winter ====
In
Pos.	Name	from	Type

Out
Pos.	Name	To	Type

== Competitions ==
=== La Liga ===
==== League table ====
===== Group 1 =====
Pos	Team	Pld	W	D	L	GF	GA	GD	Pts	Qualification
1	América	36	19	13	4	88	46	+42	51	Playoff
2	Necaxa	36	16	14	6	69	38	+31	46	Playoff
3	Tecos	36	14	14	8	50	47	+3	42	Playoff
4	Toros Neza	36	12	8	16	55	62	−7	32	
5	UANL	36	7	10	19	34	50	−16	24	

===== General table =====
Pos	Team	Pld	W	D	L	GF	GA	GD	Pts	Qualification
3	Cruz Azul	36	20	8	8	91	45	+46	48	Qualification for the quarter-finals (Note: The first four places in the table and teams ranked 6th and 8th qualified for the Liguilla quarter-finals.)
4	Necaxa	36	16	14	6	69	38	+31	46	Qualification for the quarter-finals
5	UAG (C)	36	14	14	8	50	47	+3	42	Qualification for the Repechaje (Note: Teams ranked 5th, 7th, 9th and 11th in the table qualified for Repechaje)
6	UNAM	36	15	11	10	49	36	+13	41	Qualification for the quarter-finals
7	Puebla	36	12	16	8	45	41	+4	40	Qualification for the Repechaje

Source: Liga MX
Rules for classification: 1) Points; 2) Goal difference; 3) Number of goals scored; 4) Head-to-head results between tied teams; 5) Number of goals scored away; 6) Highest relegation coefficient; 7) Fair Play points
(C) Champions

===== Results by round =====
Round	1	2	3	4	5	6	7	8	9	10	11	12	13	14	15	16	17	18	19	20	21	22	23	24	25	26	27	28	29	30	31	32	33	34	35	36	37	38
Ground	A	H	A	H	A	H	A	H	A	H	A	H	H	A	H	A	H	A	H	H	A	H	A	H	A	H	A	H	A	H	A	A	H	A	H	A	H	A
Result	W	W	L	L	D	W	L	W	W	L	-	D	D	W	D	L	W	D	W	D	L	D	L	D	W	L	W	L	L	-	L	D	D	D	W	W	L	L
Position	10	19	19	19	18	19	19	17	19	16	19	16	16	16	16	16	13	9	8	10	8	10	10	6	7	6	7	6	6	5	7	7	7	6	5	6	6	5

Source: Competitive matches
A = Away; H = Home; W = Win; D = Draw; L = Loss; P = Postponed; = Leader, Qualification for the quarter-finals; C = Qualification for the quarter-finals as group leader.; E = Qualification for the quarter-finals as group runner-up.; R = Qualification for the Repechaje.

==== Matches ====
2 September 1994 1	UAG	bye	Leones Negros UdeG	Zapopan
				Stadium: 3 de Marzo

10 September 1994 2	Veracruz	3-0	UAG	Veracruz
	Poblete 39'; José Luis Malibrán 61'; Marquinho 70'			Stadium: Pirata Fuente

16 September 1994 3	UAG	1-3	America	Zapopan
	Rizo 67'		11' Kalusha; 59' Biyik; 83' Blanco	Stadium: 3 de Marzo

25 September 1994 4	Pumas UNAM	3-0	UAG	Tlalpan
	Campos 8'; Rafael García 76'; Israel López 78'			Stadium: Olimpico Universitario

30 September 1994 5	UAG	3-0	Tampico Madero	Zapopan
	Martín Dallorso 49'; Donizete 64'; Porfirio Jiménez 89' (pen.)			Stadium: 3 de Marzo

8 October 1994 6	Necaxa	2-1	UAG	Tlalpan
	Sol 42'; Luis Hernández 90'		64' Hugo Aparecido	Stadium: Azteca

14 October 1994 7	UAG	1-1	CD Toluca	Zapopan
	Gallaga 71'		41' Pavon	Stadium: 3 de Marzo

22 October 1994 8	CF Monterrey	0-0	UAG	Monterrey
				Stadium: Tecnológico

28 October 1994 9	UAG	1-1	Leon	Zapopan
	Fernando Guijarro 66'		81' Dezotti	Stadium: 3 de Marzo

5 November 1994 10	Atlas FC	1-1	UAG	Guadalajara
	Sergio Pacheco 49'		52' Ordiales	Stadium: Jalisco

12 November 1994 11	Puebla FC	3-2	UAG	Puebla de los Angeles
	Sergio Lira 30'; Francisco Rotllán 43'; Marco Sánchez Yacuta 68'		12' Salgado; 58' (pen.) Hugo Aparecido	Stadium: Cuauhtemoc

18 November 1994 12	UAG	2-1	Santos Laguna	Zapopan
	Javier Hernández 62'; Gallaga 78'		29' Fernando Gil	Stadium: 3 de Marzo

26 November 1994 13	Cruz Azul	3-3	UAG	Tlalpan
	Hermosillo 30'; Pedro Duana 46', 51'		18', 39' Rizo; 35' Porfirio Jiménez	Stadium: Azteca

1 December 1994 14	UAG	0-0	Atlético Morelia	Zapopan
				Stadium: 3 de Marzo

7 December 1994 15	Atlante FC	2-2	UAG	Mexico City
	Sanchez 58'; Salvador 67'		56' Rizo; 60' (pen.) Porfirio Jiménez	Stadium: Azulgrana

9 December 1994 16	UAG	1-1	Correcaminos UAT	Zapopan
	Donizete 37'		74' Alex Pineda	Stadium: 3 de Marzo

17 December 1994 17	Tigres UANL	0-2	UAG	San Nicolas de los Garza
			46'Rizo; 79' Javier Hernández	Stadium: Universitario

22 December 1994 18	UAG	2-1	Toros Neza	Zapopan
	Donizete 48'; Rizo 51'		81' (pen.) Guillermo Vázquez	Stadium: 3 de Marzo

30 December 1994 19	Guadalajara	2-3	UAG	Guadalajara
	Espinosa 43', 50'		22', 42' Donizete, 26' (pen.) Hugo Aparecido	Stadium: Jalisco

6 January 1995 20	Leones Negros UdeG	bye	UAG	Guadalajara
				Stadium: Jalisco

13 January 1995 21	UAG	3-2	Veracruz	Zapopan
	Rizo 31', 37'; Dioney Carlos 81'		60' Leonel Bolsonello; 75' José Luis Malibrán	Stadium: 3 de Marzo

22 January 1995 22	América	2-1	Tecos UAG	Coyoacan
	Kalusha Bwalya 3'; Francois-Omam Biyik 61'		45' Eustacio Rizo	Stadium: Azteca

27 January 1995 23	UAG	1-1	Pumas UNAM	Zapopan
	Donizete 43'		17' José Damasceno	Stadium: 3 de Marzo

24	TM Gallos Blancos	0-1	UAG	Queretaro
				Stadium: Corregidora

10 February 1995 25	UAG	1-1	Necaxa	Zapopan
	Rizo 32'		71' Basay	Stadium: 3 de Marzo

19 February 1995 26	CD Toluca	1-2	UAG	Toluca
	Alfaro 78'		Hugo Aparecido 34'; Gallaga 41'	Stadium: La Bombonera

24 February 1995 27	UAG	2-2	CF Monterrey	Zapopan
	Claudio Morena 20'; Osmar Donizette 62'		2' David Patiño; 75' Sergio Verdirame	Stadium: 3 de Marzo

4 March 1995 28	Leon	1-2	UAG	Leon de los Aldama
	Ayipei 63'		14', 89' Gallaga	Stadium: Nou Camp

10 March 1995 29	UAG	2-0	Atlas FC	Zapopan
	Hugo Aparecido 72' (pen.); Osmar Donizete 78'			Stadium: 3 de Marzo

17 March 1995 30	UAG	3-1	Puebla	Zapopan
	Claudio Morena 43'; Hugo Aparecido 62' (pen.), 80' (pen.)		22' Arturo Álvarez	Stadium: 3 de Marzo

26 March 1995 31	Santos Laguna	3-0	UAG	Torreon
	Galindo 49' (pen.); Adomaitis 66', 89'			Stadium: Corona

31 March 1995 32	UAG	0-2	Cruz Azul	Zapopan
			85' Delgado; 88' Zamora	Stadium: 3 de Marzo

5 April 1995 33	Atlético Morelia	1-1	UAG	Morelia
	Mario Juárez 35'		65' Claudio Morena	Stadium: Morelos

9 April 1995 34	UAG	2-1	Atlante	Zapopan
	Osmar Donizete 7'; Claudio Morena 64'		55' Hugo Sánchez	Stadium: 3 de Marzo

16 April 1995 35	Correcaminos UAT	1-2	UAG	Ciudad Victoria
	Almaguer 20'		14' Marcelo Goncálvez; 53' Claudio Morena	Stadium: Tamaulipas

21 April 1995 36	UAG	0-0	Tigres UANL	Zapopan
				Stadium: 3 de Marzo

30 April 1995 37	Toros Neza	1-1	UAG	Ciudad Nezahualcoyotl
	Guillermo Vázquez 24'		59' Osmar Donizete	Stadium: Estadio Neza 86

5 May 1995 38	UAG	1-0	Guadalajara	Zapopan
	Felipe del Ángel Malibrán 86'			Stadium: 3 de Marzo

===== Repechaje =====
10 May 1995	Monterrey	2–0	UAG	Monterrey
20:45	Jáuregui 4'; Patiño 85'			Stadium: Tecnologico

13 May 1995	UAG	2–0	Monterrey	Zapopan
20:30	Ordiales 33'; Malibrán 81'			Stadium: 3 de Marzo

===== Quarterfinals =====
May 18, 1995	UAG	0-2	Necaxa	Zapopan
20:30			Basay 32'; Aspe 81'	Stadium: 3 de Marzo

21 May 1995	Necaxa	2-1	UAG	Tlalpan
12:00	Ambríz 57'; Higareda 87'		Malibrán 74'	Stadium: Azteca
