= Primera División de México Invierno 1999 =

Primera División de México
- Season: 1999–00
- Champions: Pachuca (1st title)
- Champions' Cup: Pachuca
- Copa Libertadores: América; Atlas
- Top goalscorer: Jesús Olalde (15 goals)

Primera División de México (Mexican First Division) Invierno 1999 is a Mexican football tournament - one of two short tournaments that take up the entire year to determine the champion(s) of Mexican football. It began on Saturday, August 14, 1999, and ran until November 21, when the regular season ended. In the final Pachuca defeated Cruz Azul and became champions for the first time.

== Clubs ==
Location of the Primera División Invierno 1999 teams

Team	City	Stadium
América	Mexico City	Azteca
Atlante	Mexico City	Azteca
Atlas	Guadalajara, Jalisco	Jalisco
Celaya	Celaya, Guanajuato	Miguel Alemán Valdés
Cruz Azul	Mexico City	Azul
Guadalajara	Guadalajara, Jalisco	Jalisco
León	León, Guanajuato	León
Morelia	Morelia, Michoacán	Morelos
Monterrey	Monterrey, Nuevo León	Tecnológico
Necaxa	Mexico City	Azteca
Pachuca	Pachuca, Hidalgo	Hidalgo
Puebla	Puebla, Puebla	Cuauhtémoc
Santos Laguna	Torreón, Coahuila	Corona
Toluca	Toluca, State of Mexico	Nemesio Díez
Toros Neza	Nezahualcóyotl, State of Mexico	Neza 86
UAG	Zapopan, Jalisco	Tres de Marzo
UANL	San Nicolás de los Garza, Nuevo León	Universitario
UNAM	Mexico City	Olímpico Universitario

== Regular phase ==
Group 1
Pos	Team	Pld	W	D	L	GF	GA	GD	Pts	Qualification
1	Toluca	17	9	5	3	40	25	+15	32	Directly qualified to the Liguilla (Playoffs)
2	UAG	17	7	2	8	26	35	−9	23	Directly qualified to the Liguilla (Playoffs)
3	UNAM	17	6	3	8	28	32	−4	21	
4	León	17	5	3	9	22	32	−10	18	
5	Toros Neza	17	3	3	11	19	41	−22	12	

Source: MedioTiempo

Group 2
Pos	Team	Pld	W	D	L	GF	GA	GD	Pts	Qualification
1	Cruz Azul	17	7	6	4	25	16	+9	27	Directly qualified to the Liguilla (Playoffs)
2	Morelia	17	6	4	7	26	26	0	22	Qualified for the Repechage
3	Puebla	17	5	5	7	19	19	0	20	
4	Monterrey	17	6	2	9	29	35	−6	20	
5	Celaya	17	5	4	8	19	27	−8	19	

Source: MedioTiempo

Group 3
Pos	Team	Pld	W	D	L	GF	GA	GD	Pts	Qualification
1	Atlas	17	11	5	1	40	16	+24	38	Directly qualified to the Liguilla (Playoffs)
2	América	17	8	4	5	31	18	+13	28	Directly qualified to the Liguilla (Playoffs)
3	Santos Laguna	17	5	5	7	27	35	−8	20	
4	Atlante	17	3	7	7	20	29	−9	16	

Source: MedioTiempo

Group 4
Pos	Team	Pld	W	D	L	GF	GA	GD	Pts	Qualification
1	Necaxa	17	9	3	5	32	22	+10	30	Directly qualified to the Liguilla (Playoffs)
2	Guadalajara	17	8	4	5	20	19	+1	28	Directly qualified to the Liguilla (Playoffs)
3	Pachuca	17	8	2	7	28	28	0	26	Qualified for the Repechage
4	UANL	17	5	7	5	27	23	+4	22	

Source: MedioTiempo

== League table ==
Pos	Team	Pld	W	D	L	GF	GA	GD	Pts	
1	Atlas	17	11	5	1	40	16	+24	38	Directly qualified to the Liguilla (Playoffs)
2	Toluca	17	9	5	3	40	25	+15	32	Directly qualified to the Liguilla (Playoffs)
3	Necaxa	17	9	3	5	32	22	+10	30	Directly qualified to the Liguilla (Playoffs)
4	América	17	8	4	5	31	18	+13	28	Directly qualified to the Liguilla (Playoffs)
5	Guadalajara	17	8	4	5	20	19	+1	28	Directly qualified to the Liguilla (Playoffs)
6	Cruz Azul	17	7	6	4	25	16	+9	27	Directly qualified to the Liguilla (Playoffs)
7	Pachuca	17	8	2	7	28	28	0	26	Qualified for the Repechage
8	UAG	17	7	2	8	26	35	−9	23	Directly qualified to the Liguilla (Playoffs)
9	UANL	17	5	7	5	27	23	+4	22	
10	Morelia	17	6	4	7	26	26	0	22	Qualified for the Repechage
11	UNAM	17	6	3	8	28	32	−4	21	
12	Puebla	17	5	5	7	19	19	0	20	
13	Monterrey	17	6	2	9	29	35	−6	20	
14	Santos Laguna	17	5	5	7	27	35	−8	20	
15	Celaya	17	5	4	8	19	27	−8	19	
16	León	17	5	3	9	22	32	−10	18	
17	Atlante	17	3	7	7	20	29	−9	16	
18	Toros Neza	17	3	3	11	19	41	−22	12	

Source: MedioTiempo

== Results ==
Home \ Away	AME	ATE	ATS	CEL	CAZ	GDL	LEO	MTY	MOR	NEC	PAC	PUE	SAN	TOL	TRN	UAG	UNL	UNM
América	—	–	–	6–0	1–3	2–0	–	–	1–1	0–1	–	1–0	–	1–2	2–0	4–0	–	1–2
Atlante	0–1	—	3–3	–	2–4	–	2–1	–	2–1	0–2	–	0–0	–	2–2	–	0–1	–	–
Atlas	1–1	–	—	3–0	2–3	0–0	–	–	2–1	1–1	–	1–0	–	3–2	–	2–0	–	–
Celaya	–	1–1	–	—	–	–	0–0	4–0	–	2–1	1–0		0–1	–	1–3	–	0–0	0–2
Cruz Azul	–	–	–	1–1	—	0–0	–	–	–	–	1–2	–	1–1	2–2	2–0	–	2–0	0–0
Guadalajara	–	0–1	–	0–5	–	—	–	2–1	–	2–1	1–0	–	2–2	–	2–1	–	4–0	0–0
León	2–2	–	0–4	–	1–0	1–2	—	–	2–1	2–0	–	2–2	–	2–5	–	6–2	–	–
Monterrey	2–4	4–2	0–4	–	1–0	–	3–0	—	1–2	–	–	4–2	–	–	–	2–0	–	–
Morelia	–	–	–	2–0	0–3	0–2	–	–	—	–	–	–	–	0–1	2–1	1–1	1–1	6–2
Necaxa	–	–	–	–	2–1	–	–	3–0	0–2	—	4–1	–	3–1	2–1	–	4–2	–	3–3
Pachuca	2–1	3–0	2–2	–	–	–	1–0	2–1	4–2	–	—	2–0	–	–	–	1–2	–	–
Puebla	–	–	–	1–0	0–1	1–2	–	–	0–0	2–1	–	—	–	0–0	3–1	0–1	1–1	–
Santos	0–1	1–1	1–3	–	–	–	3–0	3–2	3–4	–	2–3	1–4	—	–	–	–	–	–
Toluca	–	–	–	5–2	–	1–0	–	2–2	–	–	3–3	–	2–3	—	6–1	–	2–1	2–0
Toros Neza	–	1–1	0–5	–	–	–	2–1	2–2	–	1–3	1–0	–	2–2	–	—	–	0–4	1–2
UAG	–	–	–	1–2	1–1	3–1	–	–	–	–	–	–	1–3	1–2	3–2	—	2–0	5–4
UANL	2–2	1–1	2–3	–	–	–	3–1	2–0	–	1–1	6–2	–	0–0	–	–	–	—	3–1
UNAM	–	3–2	0–1	–	–	–	0–1	1–4	–	–	1–0	1–3	6–0	–	–	–	–	—

Updated to match(es) played on 21 November 1999. Source: RSSSF
Legend: Blue = home team win; Yellow = draw; Red = away team win.

== Top goalscorers ==
Players sorted first by goals scored, then by last name. Only regular season goals listed.

Rank	Player	Club	Goals
1	(Mexico) Jesús Olalde	UNAM	15
2	(Uruguay) Sebastián Abreu	UAG	13
3	(Mexico) Pedro Pineda	Monterrey	11
4	(Mexico) Cuauhtémoc Blanco	América	10
4	(Costa Rica) Jafet Soto	Puebla	10
6	(Mexico) Jared Borgetti	Santos Laguna	9
6	(Paraguay) José Cardozo	Toluca	9
6	(Uruguay) Carlos María Morales	Toluca	9
6	(Mexico) Luis Fernando Soto	Celaya	9
10	(Ecuador) Agustín Delgado	Necaxa	8
10	(Chile) Claudio Núñez	UANL	8
10	(Mexico) Daniel Osorno	Atlas	8
10	(Mexico) Francisco Palencia	Cruz Azul	8
10	(Mexico) Víctor Ruiz	Toluca	8

Source: MedioTiempo

== Final phase (Liguilla) ==
=== Repechage ===
November 25, 1999
15:00

Morelia	4–2	Pachuca
Lozano 7', 80'; Davino 11'; Osuna 81'	Report	Gómez 31', 78'

Estadio Morelos, Morelia
Referee: Gilberto Alcalá Pineda (Mexico City)
November 28, 1999
12:00

Pachuca	2–0	Morelia
Caballero 8'; Bernal 90'	Report

Estadio Hidalgo, Pachuca
Referee: Antonio Marrufo (Chihuahua)

4–4 on aggregate. Pachuca advanced for being the higher seeded team.

=== Bracket ===
Quarterfinals
4	América	0	1	1
5	Guadalajara	0	0	0
3	Necaxa	0	3	3
6	Cruz Azul	1	4	5
1	Atlas	3	2	5
8	UAG	2	2	4
2	Toluca	0	2	2
7	Pachuca	1	2	3

Semifinals
4	América	0	1	1
6	Cruz Azul	0	2	2
1	Atlas	0	1	1
7	Pachuca	2	0	2

Finals
6	Cruz Azul	2	0	2
7	Pachuca (asdet)	2	1	3

=== Quarterfinals ===
December 2, 1999
20:45

Guadalajara	0–0	América
	Report

Estadio Jalisco, Guadalajara
Referee: Edgar Ulises Rangel (Estado de México)
December 5, 1999
21:00

América	1–0	Guadalajara
Blanco 37'	Report

Estadio Azteca, Mexico City
Referee: Gilberto Alcalá Pineda (Mexico City)

América won 1–0 on aggregate.

December 1, 1999
16:00

Cruz Azul	1–0	Necaxa
Palencia 22'	Report

Estadio Azul, Mexico City
Referee: Felipe Ramos Rizo (Mexico City)
December 4, 1999
17:00

Necaxa	3–4	Cruz Azul
Delgado 8', 43', 75'	Report	Camoranesi 39'; Morales 50'; Latorre 58'; Pinheiro 86'

Estadio Azteca, Mexico City
Referee: Armando Archundia (Estado de México)

Cruz Azul won 5–3 on aggregate.

December 1, 1999
20:30

UAG	2–3	Atlas
Hernández 6'; Muf 64'	Report	Cocca 9'; Osorno 55', 60'

Estadio Tres de Marzo, Zapopan
Referee: Eduardo Brizio Carter (Mexico City)
December 4, 1999
20:45

Atlas	2–2	UAG
Osorno 29'; Rodríguez 72'	Report	Abreu 4', 85'

Estadio Jalisco, Guadalajara
Referee: Antonio Marrufo (Chihuahua)

Atlas won 5–4 on aggregate.

December 1, 1999
19:30

Pachuca	1–0	Toluca
Bernal 21'	Report

Estadio Hidalgo, Pachuca
Referee: Marco Antonio Rodríguez (Mexico City)
December 4, 1999
15:00

Toluca	2–2	Pachuca
Abundis 48'; Morales 87'	Report	Gómez 33', 56'

Estadio Nemesio Díez, Toluca
Referee: Felipe Ramos Rizo (Mexico City)

Pachuca won 3–2 on aggregate.

=== Semifinals ===
December 9, 1999
19:00

Cruz Azul	0–0	América
	Report

Estadio Azul, Mexico City
Referee: Edgar Ulises Rangel (Estado de México)
December 12, 1999
20:00

América	1–2	Cruz Azul
Luna 43'	Report	Palencia 40'; Latorre 70'

Estadio Azteca, Mexico City
Referee: Felipe Ramos Rizo (Mexico City)

Cruz Azul won 2–1 on aggregate.

December 8, 1999
19:30

Pachuca	2–0	Atlas
Gómez 12', 47'	Report

Estadio Hidalgo, Pachuca
Referee: Antonio Marrufo (Chihuahua)
December 11, 1999
20:45

Atlas	1–0	Pachuca
Castillo 24'	Report

Estadio Jalisco, Guadalajara
Referee: Gilberto Alcalá Pineda (Mexico City)

Pachuca won 2–1 on aggregate.

=== Finals ===
December 16, 1999
20:00

Pachuca	2–2	Cruz Azul
Glaría 23', 83'	Report	Pinheiro 22'; Reséndiz 90'

Estadio Hidalgo, Pachuca
Referee: Antonio Marrufo (Chihuahua)

First leg

Pachuca:
GK	30	(Argentina) Nacho González
DF	99	(Mexico) Manuel Vidrio	(yellow card) 90'
DF	5	(Uruguay) Pablo Hernández
DF	2	(Mexico) Alberto Rodríguez (c)
MF	7	(Mexico) Octavio Valdez
MF	9	(Mexico) Marcelino Bernal
MF	10	(Mexico) Alfonso Sosa		(substituted off) 62'
MF	8	(Argentina) Gabriel Caballero	(yellow card) 83'
MF	21	(Mexico) Cesáreo Victorino
FW	20	(Argentina) Pablo Hernán Gómez		(substituted off) 69'
FW	22	(Argentina) Alejandro Glaría		(substituted off) 79'
Substitutions:
GK	12	(Mexico) Jesús Alfaro
DF	26	(Mexico) José Juan Hernández
MF	3	(Mexico) Marco Garcés
MF	25	(Mexico) César Gómez		(substituted on) 62'
MF	58	(Mexico) Benjamín Galindo		(substituted on) 79'
FW	11	(Mexico) Gerardo Mascareño		(substituted on) 69'
FW	15	(Mexico) David Patiño
Manager:
(Mexico) Javier Aguirre

Cruz Azul:
GK	1	(Mexico) Óscar Pérez
DF	2	(Mexico) Guadalupe Castañeda
DF	4	(Peru) Juan Reynoso (c)	(yellow card) 8'
DF	5	(Mexico) Francisco Gabriel de Anda
DF	19	(Mexico) Omar Rodríguez	(yellow card) 41'
MF	6	(Mexico) Luis García
MF	7	(Mexico) Joaquín Moreno	(yellow card) 20'
MF	11	(Brazil) Julio César Pinheiro		(substituted off) 81'
MF	10	(Argentina) Ángel Morales
FW	15	(Mexico) Francisco Palencia
FW	9	(Argentina) Diego Latorre
Substitutions:
GK	33	(Mexico) Carlos Pérez
DF	3	(Mexico) José Sixtos
DF	23	(Mexico) Moisés González
DF	24	(Mexico) Eustacio Rizo
MF	13	(Mexico) Carlos Barra
MF	16	(Mexico) Jaime Ruiz
FW	30	(Mexico) Pedro Reséndiz		(substituted on) 81'
Manager:
(Mexico) Luis Fernando Tena

December 19, 1999
21:00

Cruz Azul	0–1 (a.e.t.)	Pachuca
	Report	Glaría 92'

Estadio Azul, Mexico City
Referee: Felipe Ramos Rizo (Mexico City)

Pachuca won 3–2 on aggregate.

Second leg

Cruz Azul:
GK	1	(Mexico) Óscar Pérez
DF	19	(Mexico) Omar Rodríguez	(yellow card) 51'
DF	4	(Peru) Juan Reynoso (c)
DF	5	(Mexico) Francisco Gabriel de Anda
DF	2	(Mexico) Guadalupe Castañeda
MF	7	(Mexico) Joaquín Moreno
MF	6	(Mexico) Luis García		(substituted off) 75'
MF	8	(Argentina) Mauro Camoranesi
MF	11	(Brazil) Julio César Pinheiro	(yellow card) 58'	(substituted off) 62'
MF	10	(Argentina) Ángel Morales
FW	15	(Mexico) Francisco Palencia
Substitutions:
GK	33	(Mexico) Carlos Pérez
DF	3	(Mexico) José Sixtos
DF	23	(Mexico) Moisés González
DF	24	(Mexico) Eustacio Rizo
MF	13	(Mexico) Carlos Barra		(substituted on) 75'
FW	9	(Argentina) Diego Latorre		(substituted on) 62'
FW	30	(Mexico) Pedro Reséndiz
Manager:
(Mexico) Luis Fernando Tena

Pachuca:
GK	30	(Argentina) Nacho González
DF	2	(Mexico) Alberto Rodríguez (c)	(yellow card) 41'
DF	99	(Mexico) Manuel Vidrio	(yellow card) 90'
DF	5	(Uruguay) Pablo Hernández
MF	7	(Mexico) Octavio Valdez
MF	9	(Mexico) Marcelino Bernal	(yellow card) 17'
MF	10	(Mexico) Alfonso Sosa		(substituted off) 46'
MF	8	(Argentina) Gabriel Caballero		(substituted off) 69'
MF	21	(Mexico) Cesáreo Victorino
FW	20	(Argentina) Pablo Hernán Gómez
FW	14	(Mexico) Gerardo Mascareño		(substituted off) 69'
Substitutions:
GK	12	(Mexico) Jesús Alfaro
DF	26	(Mexico) José Juan Hernández		(substituted on) 46'
MF	3	(Mexico) Marco Garcés	(yellow card) 80'	(substituted on) 69'
MF	25	(Mexico) César Gómez
MF	58	(Mexico) Benjamín Galindo
FW	15	(Mexico) David Patiño
FW	22	(Argentina) Alejandro Glaría		(substituted on) 69'
Manager:
(Mexico) Javier Aguirre

Champions

1st title
