= 1995 CONCACAF Champions' Cup =

31st edition of premier club football tournament organized by CONCACAF

Tournament details
- Host country: Costa Rica
- City: San José
- Dates: 13 December – 17 December
- Teams: 4 (from 3 associations)

Final positions
- Champions: (Costa Rica) Saprissa (2nd title)
- Runners-up: (Guatemala) Municipal

Tournament statistics
- Matches played: 6
- Goals scored: 35 (5.83 per match)

The 1995 CONCACAF Champions' Cup was the 31st edition of the annual international club football competition held in the CONCACAF region (North America, Central America and the Caribbean), the CONCACAF Champions' Cup. It determined that year's club champion of association football in the CONCACAF region and was played from 19 February till 17 December 1995.

The teams were split in 2 zones (North/ Central and Caribbean). The North/Central zone was split in 3 groups, qualifying each winner to the final tournament. The winner of the Caribbean zone, also got a place in that tournament. All qualifying matches in the tournament were played under the home/away match system, while the final tournament stage was played in San José, Costa Rica.

That final stage composed of four teams which played each other in a single round-robin tournament. Costa Rican team Saprissa crowned CONCACAF champion for second time, after finishing 1st in the final table with 7 points over 3 matches played.

== North and Central American Zone ==
=== Group 1 ===
First Round

19 March 1995	Acros Crystal (Belize)	2–1	(Costa Rica) Alajuelense	Belize City, Belize
	Nelson Moss 44'; Gilroy 'Coro' Usher 65'		Juan Carlos Arguedas 54'	Stadium: MCC Grounds

22 March 1995	Alajuelense (Costa Rica)	4–1 (5–3 agg.)	(Belize) Acros Crystal	Alajuela, Costa Rica
	Roy Lassiter 35'; González 45'; Juan Carlos Arguedas 70'; Luis Diego Arnáez 84'		Wellington 'Spooners' Hall 67'	Stadium: Estadio Alejandro Morera Soto

22 March 1995	Comunicaciones (Guatemala)	1–3	(Mexico) UAG	Guatemala City, Guatemala
	Julio Rodas 65'		Eustacio Rizo 54'; Osmar Donizette 59'; Javier Hernández 74'	Stadium: Estadio Mateo Flores

26 April 1995	UAG (Mexico)	4–1 (7–2 agg.)	(Guatemala) Comunicaciones	Zapopan, Mexico
	Claudio Morena 19'; Mauricio Gallaga 36'; Felipe del Ángel Malibrán 69'; Carlos Dioney 80'		Jorge Arriola 25'	Stadium: Estadio Tres de Marzo

2 April 1995	Juventus (Nicaragua)	1–1	(Panama) Projusa	Managua, Nicaragua
	Héctor Pérez Hernández 50'		Erick Ortega 37'	Stadium: Estadio Olímpico del IND Managua

9 April 1995	Projusa (Panama)	2–1 (a.e.t.) (3–2 agg.)	(Nicaragua) Juventus	Panama City, Panama
	Wilfredo Mojica 75'; Gilberto Aguilar 96'		Ivan Ramírez 25'	Stadium: Estadio Rommel Fernández

Second Round

Team 1	Agg.	Team 2	1st leg	2nd leg
UAG (Mexico)	15–0	(Panama) Projusa-Veraguas	5–0	10–0

- (Costa Rica) Alajuelense on bye, to the third round.

Projusa-Veraguas (Panama)	0–5	(Mexico) UAG	Panama City, Panama
		Agustín García 29'; Javier Hernández 42'; Osmar Donizette 57'; Mauricio Gallaga 62' 80'	Stadium: Estadio Javier Cruz; Attendance: 2,500

UAG (Mexico)	10–0 (15–0 agg.)	(Panama) Projusa-Veraguas	Zapopan, Mexico
Juan Parra 4' 25'; Javier Hernández 9'; Porfirio Jiménez 37' 62'; Fernando Guijarro 39' 70' 74'; Eustacio Rizo 52'; Agustín García 89'			Stadium: Estadio 3 de Marzo

Third Round

Team 1	Agg.	Team 2	1st leg	2nd leg
UAG (Mexico)	3–4	(Costa Rica) Alajuelense	2–1	1–3

UAG (Mexico)	2–1	(Costa Rica) LD Alajuelense	Zapopan, Mexico
Armando González 7'; Agustín García 88'		Froylan Ledesma 71'	Stadium: Estadio 3 de Marzo

LD Alajuelense (Costa Rica)	3–1 (4–3 agg.)	(Mexico) UAG	Alajuela, Costa Rica
Bernal Mullins 60'; Froylán Ledezma 70'; Wilmer López 104'		Arturo Reyna 30'	Stadium: Estadio Alejandro Morera Soto

=== Group 2 ===
First Round

Team 1	Agg.	Team 2	1st leg	2nd leg
Real Verdes (Belize)	0–6	(Guatemala) Municipal	0–3	0–3
Real España (Honduras)	3–7	(Mexico) Santos Laguna	1–1	2–6
FAS (El Salvador)	5–1	(Panama) Árabe Unido	4–0	1–1

Real Verdes (Belize)	0–3	(Guatemala) Municipal
		Juan José Oficialdegui 71'; Juan Carlos Plata 82'; Gardiner 86'

Municipal (Guatemala)	3–0 (6–0 agg.)	(Belize) Real Verdes	Guatemala City, Guatemala
Édgar Valencia 3' 23'; Juan Manuel Funes 46'			Stadium: Mateo Flores Stadium

Real España (Honduras)	1–1	(Mexico) Santos Laguna
Raúl Dolmo 5'		Antonio González 31'

Santos Laguna (Mexico)	6–2 (7–3 agg.)	(Honduras) Real España
Antonio González 31'; Juan José Balcázar 33' 35'; Richard Zambrano 51' 60'; Rogelio Romero 89'		Edward Barahona 45'; Camilo Bonilla 57'

FAS (El Salvador)	4–0	(Panama) Árabe Unido
Fulgencio Deonel Bordón 31'; Marcelo Bauzá 67' 76'; Hugo Pérez 79'

Árabe Unido (Panama)	1–1 (1–5 agg.)	(El Salvador) FAS
Rogelio Clark 77'		Fulgencio Deonel Bordón 46'

Second Round

Team 1	Agg.	Team 2	1st leg	2nd leg
FAS (El Salvador)	3–0	(Mexico) Santos Laguna	3–0	0–0

- (Guatemala) CSD Municipal on bye, to the third round.

FAS (El Salvador)	3–0	(Mexico) Santos Laguna
herbert Burgos 5'; Hugo Pérez 15'; Fulgencio Deonel Bordón 88'

Santos Laguna (Mexico)	0-0 (0–3 agg.)	(El Salvador) FAS

Third Round

Team 1	Agg.	Team 2	1st leg	2nd leg
FAS (El Salvador)	2–4	(Guatemala) Municipal	2–2	0–2

FAS (El Salvador)	2–2	(Guatemala) Municipal
Fulgencio Deonel Bordón; Hugo Pérez		Edgar Everaldo Valencia; Longi

Municipal (Guatemala)	2–0 (4–2 agg.)	(El Salvador) FAS
Juan Carlos Plata

=== Group 3 ===
First Round

Team 1	Agg.	Team 2	1st leg	2nd leg
Bautista (Nicaragua)	2–5	(El Salvador) Alianza	0–2	2–3
Motagua (Honduras)	0–4	(Costa Rica) Saprissa	0–1	0–3

Bautista (Nicaragua)	0–2	(El Salvador) Alianza
		Eradio Espinoza 20'; William Enrique Chachagua 77'

Alianza (El Salvador)	3–2 (5–2 agg.)	(Nicaragua) Bautista
René Durán; Milton Meléndez; Julio Santos Navarrete		Cruz; Zambrano

Motagua (Honduras)	0–1	(Costa Rica) Saprissa
		Rolando Fonseca 22'

Saprissa (Costa Rica)	3–0 (4–0 agg.)	(Honduras) Motagua
Javier Wanchope Watson 53'; Luis Herra 65'; Duarte 89' (o.g.)

Second Round

Team 1	Agg.	Team 2	1st leg	2nd leg
Saprissa (Costa Rica)	4–2	(El Salvador) Alianza	3–1	1–1

Saprissa (Costa Rica)	3–1	(El Salvador) Alianza
Rolando Fonseca; Juan Cayasso		René Durán

Alianza (El Salvador)	1–1 (2–4 agg.)	(Costa Rica) Saprissa
René Durán		Giancarlo Morera

== Caribbean Zone ==
First round

Matches and results are unavailable:
(Martinique) L'Aiglon
(French Guiana) US Sinnamary
(Guyana) Topp XX FC

Team 1	Agg.	Team 2	1st leg	2nd leg
RCA (Aruba)	w/o	(Guyana) Beacon FC		
AS Javouhey Mana (French Guiana)	1–3	(Suriname) Corona Boys	1–1	0–2
CS Moulien (Guadeloupe)	4–3	(Aruba) River Plate	4–1	0–2
Club Franciscain (Martinique)	0–1	(Haiti) AS Capoise	0–1	
San Cristóbal FC (Dominican Republic)	1–2	(Haiti) FICA	1–1	0–1

- Second leg apparently not played.*
- RCA withdrew, Beacon F.C. advances to the second round.
- Corona Boys, CS Moulien, AS Capoise, FICA, L'Aiglon, US Sinnamar and Topp XX FC advance to the second round.

AS Javouhey Mana (French Guiana)	1–1	(Suriname) Corona Boys

Corona Boys (Suriname)	2–0 (3–1 agg.)	(French Guiana) AS Javouhey Mana

CS Moulien (Guadeloupe)	4–1	(Aruba) River Plate

River Plate (Aruba)	2–0 (3–4 agg.)	(Guadeloupe) CS Moulien

Club Franciscain (Martinique)	1–0 (1–0 agg.)	(Haiti) AS Capoise

San Cristóbal FC (Dominican Republic)	1–1	(Haiti) FICA

FICA (Haiti)	1–0 (2–1 agg.)	San Cristóbal FC

Second round

Team 1	Agg.	Team 2	1st leg	2nd leg
Beacon FC (Guyana)	w/o	(Martinique) L'Aiglon		
FICA (Haiti)	***	(French Guiana) US Sinnamary		
Corona Boys (Suriname)	1–1; 2–4 (pen.)	(Guadeloupe) CS Moulien	1–0	0–1
Topp XX FC (Guyana)	w/o	(Haiti) AS Capoise	2–0	

- Beacon FC advanced; presumably L'Aiglon withdrew.
- AS Capoise withdrew.
- Both clubs apparently withdrew.***
- CS Moulien advance to the third round.

Corona Boys (Suriname)	1–0	(Guadeloupe) CS Moulien

CS Moulien (Guadeloupe)	1–0 (1–1 (pen. 4–2) agg.)	(Suriname) Corona Boys

Third round

Team 1	Agg.	Team 2	1st leg	2nd leg
Topp XX FC (Guyana)	4– 4; 4–5 (pen.)	(Guyana) Beacon FC	2–0	2–4

- (Guadeloupe) CS Moulien on bye, to the fourth round.
- Beacon FC advance to the fourth round.

Topp XX FC (Guyana)	2–0	(Guyana) Beacon FC

Beacon FC (Guyana)	4–2 (4–4 (pen 5–4) agg.)	(Guyana) Topp XX FC

Fourth round

Team 1	Agg.	Team 2	1st leg	2nd leg
(Guadeloupe) CS Moulien	4–0*	(Guyana) Beacon FC		

- Beacon withdrew, both legs awarded 2–0 to CS Moulien.*
- CS Moulien advance to Final Group stage.

== Final Group stage ==
All matches played in San José, Costa Rica

As of 17 December 1995

Pos	Team	Pld	W	D	L	GF	GA	GD	Pts
1	(Costa Rica) Saprissa	3	2	1	0	8	2	+6	7
2	(Guatemala) Municipal	3	2	0	1	13	3	+10	6
3	(Costa Rica) Alajuelense	3	1	1	1	13	6	+7	4
4	(Guadeloupe) Moulien	3	0	0	3	1	24	−23	0

=== Matches ===
13 December 1995 Round 1	Saprissa (Costa Rica)	5–0	(Guadeloupe) Moulien	San José, Costa Rica
(UTC−06:00)	González 26'; Myers 39'; Fonseca 69'; Drummond 78'; Morera 81'			Stadium: Estadio Ricardo Saprissa Aymá

13 December 1995 Round 1	Alajuelense (Costa Rica)	2–3	(Guatemala) Municipal	San José, Costa Rica
(UTC−06:00)	Gómez 28'; Ledezma 32'		Funes 2'; Oficialdegui 9'; Valencia 36'	Stadium: Estadio Ricardo Saprissa Aymá

15 December 1995 Round 2	Alajuelense (Costa Rica)	9–1	(Guadeloupe) Moulien	San José, Costa Rica
(UTC−06:00)	Badilla 5'; Ledezma 19' 35' 62'; Marín 20'; Montero 38' 44'; Mullins 47'; Gómez 72'		Makongo 56'	Stadium: Estadio Ricardo Saprissa Aymá

15 December 1995 Round 2	Saprissa (Costa Rica)	1–0	(Guatemala) Municipal	San José, Costa Rica
(UTC−06:00)	Wanchope 24'			Stadium: Estadio Ricardo Saprissa Aymá

17 December 1995 Round 3	Saprissa (Costa Rica)	2–2	(Costa Rica) Alajuelense	San José, Costa Rica
(UTC−06:00)	Fonseca 16' 20'		López 34'; Arnáez 53'	Stadium: Estadio Ricardo Saprissa Aymá

17 December 1995 Round 3	Moulien (Guadeloupe)	0–10	(Guatemala) Municipal	San José, Costa Rica
(UTC−06:00)			Plata 8' 37' 51' 70' 72' 80'; Ivaldi 12'; Funes 40'; Oficialdegui 55'; Méndez 65'	Stadium: Estadio Ricardo Saprissa Aymá

== Champion ==
CONCACAF Champions' Cup
1995 Winners
(Costa Rica)
Saprissa
Second title
