= Naomichi Ueda =

Japanese footballer (born 1994)

Naomichi Ueda 植田 直通
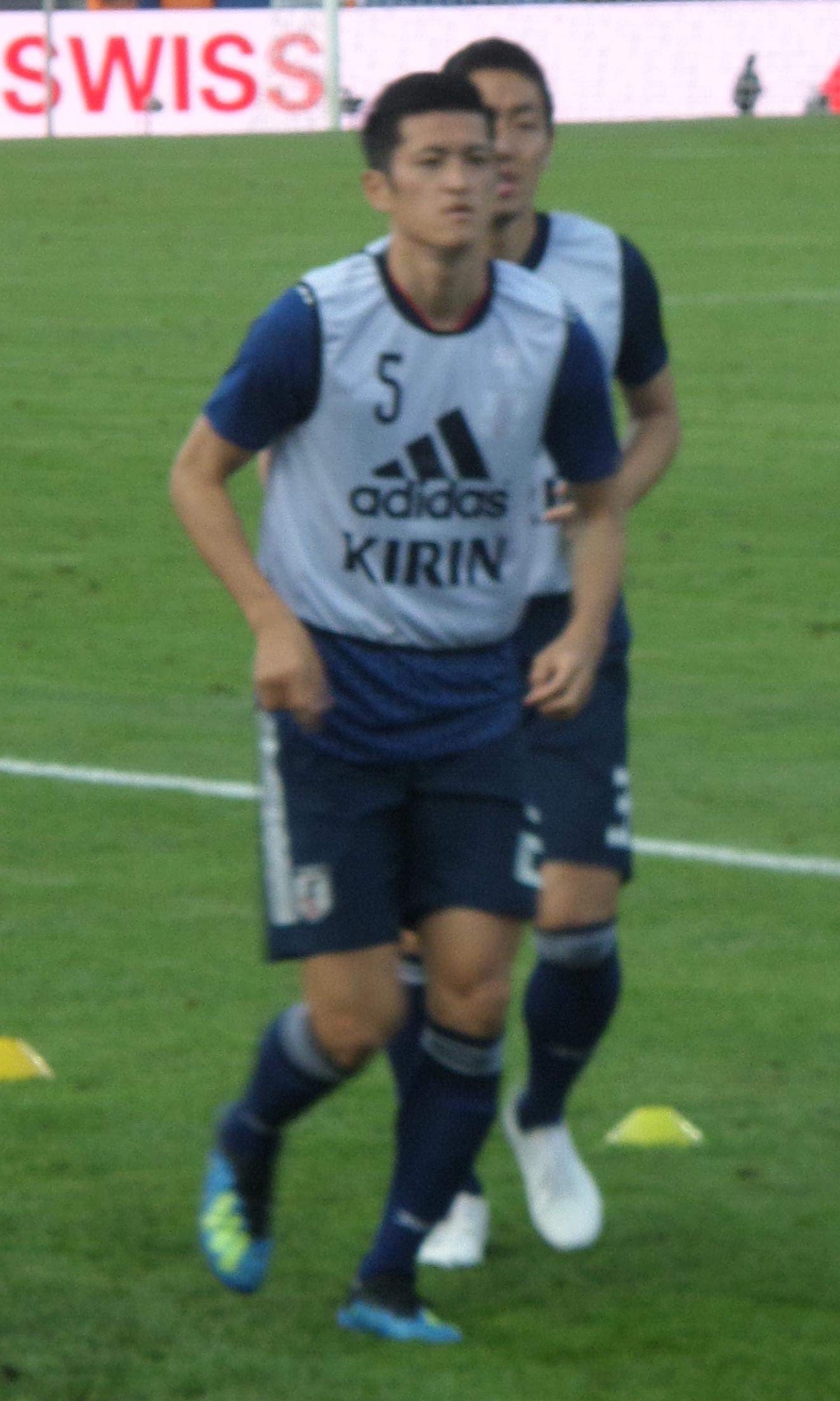
- Ueda with Japan in 2018

Personal information
- Full name: Naomichi Ueda
- Date of birth: 24 October 1994 (age 32)
- Place of birth: Uto, Kumamoto, Japan
- Height: 1.86 m (6 ft 1 in)
- Position: Centre-back

Team information
- Current team: Kashima Antlers
- Number: 55

Youth career
- –2006: Midorikawa SSS
- 2007–2009: Sumiyoshi Junior High School
- 2010–2012: Ohzu High School

Senior career*
Years	Team	Apps	(Gls)
2013–2018	Kashima Antlers	96	(4)
2014–2015	→ J. League U-22 (loan)	4	(0)
2018–2021	Cercle Brugge	48	(0)
2021	→ Nîmes (loan)	9	(0)
2021–2022	Nîmes	29	(0)
2023–	Kashima Antlers	131	(9)

International career^{‡}
2011	Japan U17	5	(1)
2016	Japan U23	9	(1)
2017–	Japan	18	(1)
Medal record
Kashima Antlers
Winner	J.League Cup	2015
Winner	J1 League	2016
Winner	Emperor's Cup	2016
Winner	Japanese Super Cup	2017
Runner-up	J1 League	2017
Winner	AFC Champions League	2018
Representing Japan
AFC U-23 Championship
Gold medal – first place	2016 Qatar
- * Club domestic league appearances and goals as of 11 August 2026 ‡ National team caps and goals as of 15 July 2025

Naomichi Ueda (植田 直通, Ueda Naomichi; born 24 October 1994) is a Japanese professional footballer who plays as a centre-back for J1 League club Kashima Antlers and the Japan national team.

== Club career ==
=== Early career ===
Born in Uto, Kumamoto, Japan, Ueda began playing football when he was at third grade elementary school. Ueda then attended Uto City Sumiyoshi Junior High School and Kumamoto Prefectural Ohzu High School. While at high school, he started in a forward but switched to a centre–back position. Ueda was impressed by Manager Kazunori Hiraoka, who described him as "a very rare material in Japan". Ueda, himself, spoke out about his development and playing in the centre–back position. He also became a captain for Kumamoto Prefectural Otsu High School.

His performance at high school attracted clubs from J. League clubs, such as, Urawa Red Diamonds, Yokohama F. Marinos, Kawasaki Frontale, FC Tokyo, Nagoya Grampus and Kashima Antlers. It was announced on 4 September 2012 that Shoji would be joining Kashima Antlers from 1 January 2013.

=== Kashima Antlers ===
Ueda made his first-team debut for Kashima Antlers in the J. League Cup on 23 March 2013 against F.C. Tokyo in which he started and played the whole 90 minutes as Kashima lost the match 4–2. Two months later on 22 May 2013, Ueda made another appearance for the side, starting the whole game, in a 2–1 loss against Cerezo Osaka. He later played a role against Sony Sendai in the second round of the Emperor's Cup on 7 September 2013, setting up the club's first goal of the game, in a 3–0 win. However, Ueda found his first team opportunities limited in his first season at Kashima Antlers and appeared as an unused substitute for most of the season. At the end of the 2013 season, he went on to make three appearances for the side in all competitions.

At the start of the 2014 season, Ueda made his league debut for the club, coming on as a 78th-minute substitute, in a 4–0 win against Ventforet Kofu in the opening game of the season. A month later on 16 April 2014, he set up the winning goal for Shuhei Akasaki, in a 2–1 win against Vegalta Sendai in the J.League Cup. Nine days later on 25 April 2014, Ueda made his first league starts for the side, keeping a clean sheet, in a 3–0 win against Sanfrecce Hiroshima. Having started the season on the substitute bench, he began to establish himself in the starting eleven, playing in the centre–back position, under the management of Toninho Cerezo. This lasted until Ueda missed one match due to fatigue on 16 August 2014. He made his return to the first team on 23 August 2014 against Shimizu S-Pulse and started the match before being sent–off in the 63rd minute for a second bookable offence, in a 3–1 win. After spending two months away from the club, due to international commitment, Ueda made his return to the starting line-up on 18 October 2014, starting the whole game, in a 3–2 loss against Kashiwa Reysol. He later regained his first team for the rest of the 2014 season and went on to make twenty–six appearances in all competitions.

At the start of the 2015 season, Ueda made his AFC Champions League debut, starting the whole game, in a 3–1 loss against Western Sydney Wanderers on 25 February 2015. It wasn't until on 16 April 2015 when he scored his first goal for the club, in a 3–1 win against Kashiwa Reysol. Ueda continued to receive a handful of first team football throughout the league's first stage. However, his first team opportunities at the club became limited, due to the arrival of new signing, Hwang Seok-ho and spent time on the substitute bench as a result. At the end of the 2015 season, he went on to make sixteen appearances and scoring once in all competitions. Following this, Ueda was linked a move away from Kashima Antlers, with Sagan Tosu and Vissel Kobe interested in signing him.

At the start of the 2016 season, Ueda started the season well when he helped Kashima Antlers keep two clean sheets in the first two league matches of the season. Ueda also managed to regain his first team place, playing in the centre–back position. After the match in a 3–0 win against Shonan Bellmare on 16 April 2016, he was in tears in a post-match interview and dedicate the win to his family and people who were in situation at Kumamoto earthquakes. Ueda later helped the side finish first place in the first stage of the league. However, he soon found himself placed on the substitute bench for the rest of the 2016 season. Despite this, Ueda continued to be involved in the Kashima Antlers’ first team and helped the side finish at the top of the table. Although he made one appearance in the Championship stage, the club win the league after playing both legs to beat Urawa Red Diamonds 2–2 on aggregate through away goal. Ueda appeared three out of the four matches in the FIFA Club World Cup, as he helped Kashima Antlers reach the final, only to lose 4–2 against Real Madrid. Despite losing in the final, both Ueda and Gen Shoji's centre-back partnership were praised by the media, both in and outside of Japan. Ueda then featured for the next two matches by beating Sanfrecce Hiroshima and Yokohama F. Marinos to reach the Emperor's Cup Final. He then started in the final, starting the whole game, in a 2–1 win against Kawasaki Frontale. At the end of the 2016 season, Ueda went on to make thirty–one appearances in all competitions.

At the start of the 2017 season, Ueda started the whole match against Urawa Red Diamonds in the Japanese Super Cup, as he helped Kashima Antlers win 3–2 to win the trophy. Ueda then helped the side keep three clean sheets in three matches between 4 March 2017 and 14 March 2017. During which, he scored two goals, scoring against Shimizu S-Pulse and Brisbane Roar on 14 March 2017 and 18 March 2017. For his performance in the AFC Champions League, Ueda was named March's Young Player of the Month. Ueda started in every match since the start of the season until he suffered a thigh injury in mid–May. It wasn't until on 4 June 2017 when Ueda returned to the starting line-up, in a 3–1 win against Sanfrecce Hiroshima. He appeared in the next two matches, keeping a clean sheet against Hokkaido Consadole Sapporo and Albirex Niigata before suffering another thigh injury. After missing two matches, Ueda returned to the starting line-up, keeping a clean sheet, in a 3–0 win against Ventforet Kofu on 29 July 2017. He helped Kashima Antlers keep three clean sheets between 19 August 2017 and 9 September 2017. Ueda then scored his third goal of the season, in a 2–1 win against Gamba Osaka on 23 September 2017. His fourth goal of the season came on 21 October 2017, in a 3–2 loss against Yokohama F. Marinos. He later helped Kashima Antlers keep three clean sheets in the last three remaining matches but the club finished second place behind Kawasaki Frontale. At the end of the 2017 season, Ueda went on to make thirty–nine appearances and scoring four times in all competitions.

Ahead of the 2018 season, 2. Bundesliga side Union Berlin was interested in signing Ueda. Although the move never took place, he continued to reaffirm his commitment at Kashima Antlers and helped the club keep two clean sheets in the first two league matches of the season. Ueda scored his first goal of the season, in a 2–0 win against Sydney in the AFC Champions League on 7 March 2018. Since the start of the 2018 season, he continued to be a first team regular for the side, playing in the centre–back position until his departure. By the time Ueda departed Kashima Antlers, he went on to make twenty appearances and scoring once in all competitions.

During his time at Kashima Antlers, Ueda was called up by J.League U-22 on two occasions between 2014 and 2015. He played four times for the U-22 side between 2014 and 2015.

=== Cercle Brugge ===
It was announced on 12 July 2018 that Ueda is moving abroad for the first time in his career by agreeing to join Belgian First Division A side Cercle Brugge. The move was confirmed, as he signed a four–year contract on an undisclosed fee. Upon joining Cercle Brugge, the club's chairman Frans Schotte said: "Ueda is a defender who has already gained a lot of experience as a basic player with the Japanese top team Kashima Antlers. With his discipline, boundless commitment and footballing potential, Ueda as a Japanese international is a real asset to Cercle Brugge!"

Ueda made his Cercle Brugge debut, starting the whole game and keeping a clean sheet, in a 0–0 draw against Standard Liège. Since making his debut for the club, Ueda found himself rotating in the starting line-up, as he began to fight for his first team place. From February to the end of the league's regular season, Ueda was dropped from the starting line-up, although he appeared twice for the side. It wasn't until on 6 April 2019 when Ueda scored his first goal for Cercle Brugge, scoring from a header, in a 3–2 win against Royal Excel Mouscron. After the match, he was named Man of the Match. At the end of the 2018–19 season, Ueda finished his first season, making twenty–seven appearances and scoring once in all competitions. Reflecting on his first season, Manager Laurent Guyot said about Ueda: "Ueda moved to Belgium just after the World Cup in Russia and this was his first time living outside Japan. It has not been easy for him because he has had to adapt to so many things such as the language, the culture, his new teammates and then there is also the competition within the team. It is not easy to communicate with him, but he is well within the group."

At the start of the 2019–20 season, Ueda continued to regain his first team place, playing in the centre–back position, as the club displayed a poor start to the season, winning once in the first six league matches. After missing three matches between 14 September 2019 and 28 September 2019, he made his return to the starting line-up on 6 October 2019, in a 6–0 loss against Zulte Waregem. Shortly after, Ueda began to regain his first team place for the next three months. However, he lost his first team place in the starting line–up and found himself placed on the substitute bench, as Cercle Brugge began battling in the relegation zone. Eventually, the club managed to secure their top-flight status after the season was cancelled because of the COVID-19 pandemic. At the end of the 2019–20 season, Ueda finished his first season, making twenty appearances in all competitions.

=== Nîmes ===
On 18 January 2021, Ueda joined Ligue 1 club Nîmes Olympique on a loan deal until the end of the season. The deal included an option to buy.

On 29 May 2021, Nîmes Olympique exercised Ueda's purchase option, securing his services until 2023.

=== Return to Kashima Antlers ===
On 30 November 2022, it was confirmed that Ueda would make a permanent return to his former club, Kashima Antlers. Throughout the season, he participated in all 34 games, contributing with 2 goals while playing a pivotal role in the team's defense.

== International career ==
=== Youth career ===
In July 2010, Ueda was called up to the Japan U16 squad for the first time during his time at Kumamoto Prefectural Otsu High School. He made his Japan U16 debut on 6 August 2010 and helped the side beat United Arab Emirates U16 1–0. Later in 2010, Ueda was called up to the national team squad for the AFC U-16 Championship in Uzbekistan. Ueda started the tournament well when he scored Japan's U16 in a 6–0 win against Vietnam U16 on 25 October 2010. Ueda helped Japan U16 progress through the tournament before being eliminated by North Korea U16 in the semi–finals.

Ueda was a part of the Japan U17 side that participated in the 2011 FIFA U-17 World Cup. He started in all of Japan's five fixtures during the tournament as the team made it all the way to the quarter-finals. During the tournament. Ueda scored one goal during the tournament against the Argentina U17s in which he found the net in the 20th minute as Japan went on to win the match 3–1.

A month after the end of the FIFA U-17 World Cup, Ueda was called up to the Japan U18 squad for the SBS Cup. He started all three matches in the tournament, Japan U18 finished as runner-up.

In March 2012, Ueda was called up to the Japan U19 squad. He made his Japan U19 debut, starting the whole game, in a 4–2 win against beat United Arab Emirates U19. Five month later in August 2012, Ueda was called up to the squad once again for the SBS Cup. He played all three matches in the tournament, Japan U19 finished as a winner. In October 2012, Ueda was called up to the Japan U19 squad for the AFC U-19 Championship. However, he appeared as an unused substitute throughout the tournament.

In January 2014, Ueda was called up to Japan U22's squad for the AFC U-22 Championship in Oman. He started every match to help Japan U22 progress to the knockout stage, where they were eliminated in the quarter–finals by Iraq U22.

In August 2014, it was announced that Ueda was called up to the Japan U21 for the Asian Games in South Korea. He started all three matches and helped the side reach the knockout stage. Ueda played two more matches in the tournament, where he helped the side beat Palestine U21 in the Round of 16 before being eliminated by South Korea in the quarter–finals.

In January 2016, Ueda was called up by the Japan U23 for the AFC U-23 Championship in Qatar. Ueda scored the opening goal of the game, in a 1–0 win against North Korea and later helped Japan reach the knockout stage after winning all three matches. Ueda later helped Japan U23 reach the final after beating Iran U23 and Iraq U23. He started in the final against South Korea U23 and later helped the side win 3–2 to win the AFC U-23 Championship.

Later in the summer of 2016. Ueda was selected for the Japan U23 for the 2016 Summer Olympics. He previously stated his determination to earn his place in the Olympics. He played all three matches, as Japan U23 were eliminated in the group stage tournament.

=== Senior career ===
Two months later, it was announced that Ueda was called up to the Japan national team by manager Javier Aguirre in place of Atsuto Uchida ahead of the AFC Asian Cup in Australia. However, he appeared as an unused substitute throughout the tournament. On 7 May 2015, Japan's coach Vahid Halilhodžić called Ueda for a two-days training camp. For the next two years, he was called up to the national squad, appearing as an unused substitute.

In December 2017, Ueda was called up to the national team squad for the EAFF E-1 Football Championship as a host. He made his Japan debut on 13 December 2017, starting the whole game, in a 2–1 win against China. After the match, Ueda spoke out on his Japan's debut, saying that he had desire to get out early. However, his second appearance for Japan saw them lose 4–1 to South Korea in a deciding match, which resulted in the opposition team becoming champions in the tournament.

In May 2018, Uena was named in Japan's preliminary squad for the 2018 FIFA World Cup in Russia. Eventually, he made it to the final cut of the 23-men squad. However, he failed to make an appearance in the World Cup and said: “My goal is to become a player who can act on a global level. My desire to develop only intensified while I watched the World Cup matches from the bench.”

Following the World Cup, Ueda did not receive another call-up until he was included for Japan's preliminary squad for the Copa América in Brazil. He started all three matches, playing in the centre–back position, as they were eliminated in the group stage. After the match, Ueda made an apology to the national team. Despite this, Ueda played four out of the six remaining matches of 2019, as he helped Japan keep three clean sheets.

== Personal life ==
Growing up, Ueda did Taekwondo when he first started in the second grade after his parents recommended him and continued to practice. However, Ueda stopped taking lessons after he entered junior high school to focus on his football career. He said he idolised Carles Puyol.

== Career statistics ==
=== Club ===
As of match played 6 December 2025

Appearances and goals by club, season and competition
Club	Season	League			National cup (Note: Includes Emperor's Cup, Belgian Cup and Coupe de France)		League cup (Note: Includes J.League Cup)		Continental		Other		Total	
Club	Season	Division	Apps	Goals	Apps	Goals	Apps	Goals	Apps	Goals	Apps	Goals	Apps	Goals
Kashima Antlers	2013	J1 League	0	0	1	0	2	0	—		—		3	0
Kashima Antlers	2014	J1 League	20	0	1	0	3	0	—		—		24	0
Kashima Antlers	2015	J1 League	12	1	2	0	0	0	2 (Note: Appearances in the AFC Champions League)	0	—		16	1
Kashima Antlers	2016	J1 League	21	0	4	0	2	0	—		4 (Note: Appearances in the J.League Championship and the FIFA Club World Cup)	0	31	0
Kashima Antlers	2017	J1 League	29	3	2	0	0	0	7	1	1 (Note: Appearance in the Japanese Super Cup)	0	39	4
Kashima Antlers	2018	J1 League	14	0	0	0	0	0	6	1	—		20	1
Kashima Antlers	Total		96	4	10	0	7	0	15	2	5	0	133	6
J.League U-22 (loan)	2014	J3 League	2	0	0	0	—		—		—		2	0
J.League U-22 (loan)	2015	J3 League	2	0	0	0	—		—		—		2	0
J.League U-22 (loan)	Total		4	0	0	0	—		—		—		4	0
Cercle Brugge	2018–19	Belgian First Division A	21	0	1	0	—		—		5 (Note: Appearances in Europa League play-offs)	1	27	1
Cercle Brugge	2019–20	Belgian First Division A	19	0	1	0	—		—		—		20	0
Cercle Brugge	2020–21	Belgian First Division A	8	0	0	0	—		—		—		8	0
Cercle Brugge	Total		48	0	2	0	—		—		5	1	55	1
Nîmes (loan)	2020–21	Ligue 1	9	0	1	0	—		—		—		10	0
Nîmes	2021–22	Ligue 2	28	0	3	0	—		—		—		31	0
Nîmes	2022–23	Ligue 2	1	0	0	0	—		—		—		1	0
Nîmes	Total		29	0	3	0	—		—		—		32	0
Kashima Antlers	2023	J1 League	34	2	1	0	6	0	—		—		41	2
Kashima Antlers	2024	J1 League	38	3	4	1	2	0	—		—		44	4
Kashima Antlers	2025	J1 League	38	2	3	0	2	0	—		—		43	2
Kashima Antlers	2026	J1 (100)	20	2	—		—		—		—		20	2
Kashima Antlers	2026–27	J1 League	0	0	0	0	0	0	0	0	—		0	0
Kashima Antlers	Total		130	9	8	1	10	0	0	0	—		148	10
Career total			316	13	26	1	17	0	15	2	10	1	382	17

=== International ===
As of 15 July 2025

Appearances and goals by national team and year
National team	Year	Apps	Goals
Japan	2017	2	0
Japan	2018	2	0
Japan	2019	7	0
Japan	2020	2	1
Japan	2021	3	0
Japan	2025	2	0
Total		18	1

Scores and results list Japan's goal tally first, score column indicates score after each Ueda goal.

List of international goals scored by Naomichi Ueda
No.	Date	Venue	Opponent	Score	Result	Competition
1	13 October 2020	Stadion Galgenwaard, Utrecht, Netherlands	Ivory Coast	1–0	1–0	Friendly

== Honours ==
=== Club ===
Kashima Antlers

- J.League Cup: 2015
- Emperor's Cup: 2016
- J1 League: 2016, 2025
- Japanese Super Cup: 2017
- AFC Champions League: 2018

=== International ===
Japan U23

- AFC U-23 Championship: 2016

Japan

- EAFF Championship: 2025

=== Individual ===
- J.League Best XI: 2025
- J1 100 Year Vision League Regional Round East Best Eleven: 2026
