= 2026–27 Kashima Antlers season =

Japanese football club season

Kashima Antlers
2026–27 season
- Chairman: Fumiaki Koizumi
- Manager: Toru Oniki
- Stadium: Kashima Soccer Stadium
Home colours	Away colours

The 2026–27 season is Kashima Antlers' 81th season in existence. They will also play in the 2026–27 AFC Champions League Elite after winning the 2025 J1 League.

== Squad ==
=== Season squad ===
Squad no.	Name	Nationality	Date of birth	Previous club
Goalkeepers
1	Tomoki Hayakawa	(Japan)	3 March 1999 (age 27)	(Japan) Meiji University
21	Taiki Yamada	(Japan)	8 January 2002 (age 24)	(Japan) Fagiano Okayama
29	Yuji Kajikawa	(Japan)	26 July 1991 (age 35)	(Japan) Júbilo Iwata
38	Haruto Fujii	(Japan)	5 June 2003 (age 23)	(Japan) Meiji University
Defenders
2	Koki Anzai	(Japan)	31 May 1995 (age 31)	(Portugal) Portimonense
3	Kim Tae-hyeon	(South Korea)	17 September 2000 (age 26)	(Japan) Sagan Tosu
4	Kaito Chida	(Japan)	17 October 1994 (age 32)	(Japan) Tokyo Verdy
5	Ikuma Sekigawa	(Japan)	13 September 2000 (age 26)	(Japan) RKU Kashiwa High School
7	Ryoya Ogawa	(Japan)	24 November 1996 (age 29)	(Belgium) Sint-Truidense
19	Sho Omori	(Japan)	19 August 1999 (age 27)	(Japan) Mito HollyHock
23	Keisuke Tsukui	(Japan)	21 May 2004 (age 22)	(Japan) Shohei High School
25	Ryuta Koike	(Japan)	29 August 1995 (age 31)	(Japan) Yokohama F. Marinos
28	Yugo Okawa	(Japan)	14 July 2007 (age 19)	Youth Team
35	Anthony Udemba Motosuna	(Japan)	10 March 2009 (age 17)	Youth Team
37	Rikuto Hirose	(Japan)	23 September 1995 (age 31)	(Japan) Vissel Kobe
45	Koki Kurahashi ^{Type 2}	(Japan)	5 July 2009 (age 17)	Youth Team
55	Naomichi Ueda	(Japan)	24 October 1994 (age 32)	(France) Nimes
Midfielders
6	Kento Misao	(Japan)	16 April 1996 (age 30)	(Belgium) OH Leuven
8	Matheus Bueno	(Brazil)	30 July 1998 (age 28)	(Japan) Shimizu S-Pulse
10	Gaku Shibasaki (c)	(Japan)	28 May 1992 (age 34)	(Spain) CD Leganés
14	Yuta Higuchi	(Japan)	30 October 1996 (age 30)	(Japan) Sagan Tosu
24	Haruki Hayashi	(Japan)	5 December 2003 (age 22)	(Japan) Meiji University
27	Yūta Matsumura	(Japan)	13 April 2001 (age 25)	(Japan) Tokyo Verdy
42	Rui Onuki ^{Type 2}	(Japan)	9 April 2008 (age 18)	Youth Team
43	Yuwa Fukuoka ^{Type 2}	(Japan)	29 October 2008 (age 18)	Youth Team
44	Daigo Hirashima ^{Type 2}	(Japan)	17 June 2008 (age 18)	Youth Team
46	Sora Iwatsuchi ^{Type 2}	(Japan)	1 May 2009 (age 17)	Youth Team
Forwards
9	Léo Ceará	(Brazil)	3 February 1995 (age 31)	(Japan) Cerezo Osaka
11	Kyosuke Tagawa	(Japan)	11 February 1999 (age 27)	(Scotland) Heart
17	Élber	(Brazil)	27 May 1992 (age 34)	(Japan) Yokohama F. Marinos
18	Yan Matheus	(Brazil)	4 September 1998 (age 28)	Qatar SC
30	Minato Yoshida ^{Type 2}	(Japan)	15 July 2008 (age 18)	Youth Team
34	Homare Tokuda	(Japan)	18 February 2007 (age 19)	Youth Team
40	Yuma Suzuki	(Japan)	28 April 1996 (age 30)	(Belgium) Sint-Truidense
47	Eito Takaki ^{Type 2}	(Japan)	8 August 2009 (age 17)	Youth Team
48	Shu Takizawa ^{Type 2}	(Japan)	10 April 2009 (age 17)	Youth Team
77	Aleksandar Čavrić	(Serbia)	18 May 1994 (age 32)	(Slovenia) Slovan Bratislava
Players who left on loan
16	Shuhei Mizoguchi (D)	(Japan)	13 February 2004 (age 22)	Youth Team
20	Yu Funabashi (M)	(Japan)	12 July 2002 (age 24)	Youth Team
32	Haruto Matsumoto (D)	(Japan)	29 September 2006 (age 20)	Youth Team
33	Yoshiro Shimoda (M)	(Japan)	5 May 2004 (age 22)	(Japan) Tochigi City
36	Mihiro Sato (D)	(Japan)	26 February 2007 (age 19)	(Japan) Albirex Niigata

Last updated: 18 August 2025.
Source: Kashima Antlers website

== Friendly ==
=== Tour of Fukushima (7-18 July) ===
12 July 1	Kashima Antlers	–	Sendai University	Fukushima
				Stadium: J-Village Camp

15 July 2	Kashima Antlers	–	Vegalta Sendai	Fukushima
				Stadium: J-Village Camp

== Transfers ==
=== In ===
Pre-season

Date	Position	Player	Transferred from	Ref
Permanent Transfer
31 May 2026	DF	(Japan) Mihiro Sato	(Japan) Albirex Niigata	End of loan
31 May 2026	MF	(Japan) Yoshihiro Shimoda	(Japan) Tochigi City	End of loan
19 June 2026	MF	(Brazil) Matheus Bueno	(Japan) Shimizu S-Pulse	Undisclosed
20 July 2026	DF	(Japan) Rikuto Hirose	(Japan) Vissel Kobe	Undisclosed
20 July 2026	FW	(Brazil) Yan Matheus	Qatar SC	Undisclosed
16 September 2026	DF	(Japan) Sho Omori	(Japan) Mito HollyHock	Undisclosed
August 2026	MF	(Japan) Atsuki Itō	(Belgium) Gent	Undisclosed
Loan Transfer

=== Out ===
Pre-season
Date	Position	Player	Transferred to	Ref
Permanent Transfer
17 June 2026	FW	(Japan) Shu Morooka	(Japan) Avispa Fukuoka	Undisclosed
17 June 2026	FW	(Japan) Kei Chinen	(Japan) Yokohama F. Marinos	Undisclosed
20 July 2026	DF	(Japan) Ryōtarō Araki	(Belgium) Sint-Truidense	Undisclosed
29 July 2026	DF	(Japan) Kimito Nono	(United States) DC United	Undisclosed
Loan Transfer
18 June 2026	DF	(Japan) Haruto Matsumoto	(Japan) Kataller Toyama	Season loan
18 June 2026	DF	(Japan) Shuhei Mizoguchi	(Japan) Tokyo Verdy	Season loan
18 June 2026	DF	(Japan) Mihiro Sato	(Japan) Albirex Niigata	Season loan
18 June 2026	MF	(Japan) Yu Funabashi	(Japan) Mito HollyHock	Season loan
23 June 2026	MF	(Japan) Yoshihiro Shimoda	(Japan) Kochi United	Season loan

=== Extension ===
Position	Player	Ref
DF	(Japan) Ryuta Koike	
FW	(Brazil) Léo Ceará	

== Competitions ==
=== J1 League ===
Pos	Team	Pld	W	D	L	GF	GA	GD	Pts	Qualification or relegation
4	Machida Zelvia	14	8	5	1	30	10	+20	29	Qualification for the AFC Champions League Elite playoff round
5	Vissel Kobe	14	8	3	3	23	14	+9	27	
6	Kashima Antlers	14	7	2	5	29	24	+5	23	
7	Yokohama F. Marinos	14	5	7	2	21	15	+6	22	
8	Kawasaki Frontale	14	6	4	4	28	24	+4	22	

Updated to match(es) played on 8 November 2026. Source: JLeague.jp,
Rules for classification: 1) Points; 2) Goal difference; 3) Goals scored; 4) Head-to-head points; 5) Head-to-head goal difference; 6) Head-to-head goals scored; 7) Fewer disciplinary points.

==== Matches ====
The matches were unveiled on 13 June.

7 August 1	Yokohama F. Marinos	3–4	Kashima Antlers	Tokyo
	Shin Miidera 7'; Kaina Tanimura 18', 58'	Report	Léo Ceará 11', 81'; Aleksandar Čavrić 90+9' (pen.), 90+13'; Yuma Suzuki (yellow card) 25'	Stadium: MUFG Stadium; Attendance: 63,960; Referee: Hiroyuki Kimura

15 August 2	Kashima Antlers	2–1	Nagoya Grampus	Kashima
	Léo Ceará 22' (yellow card) 48'; Ikuma Sekigawa 90+8'; Kento Misao (yellow card) 25'; Yuma Suzuki (yellow card) 45'	Report	Naomichi Ueda 54' (o.g.); Sho Inagaki (yellow card) 77'	Stadium: Kashima Soccer Stadium; Attendance: 33,560; Referee: Florian Exner (France)

22 August 3	Kashima Antlers	3–2	Avispa Fukuoka	Kashima
	Tatsuki Nara 31' (o.g.); Léo Ceará 60'; Aleksandar Čavrić 64'; Ikuma Sekigawa (yellow card) 67'	Report	Shu Morooka 42'; Léo Ceará 76' (o.g.); Tatsuki Nara (yellow card) 39'	Stadium: Kashima Soccer Stadium; Attendance: 24,717; Referee: Hayato Shimizu

29 August 4	Tokyo Verdy	0–2	Kashima Antlers	Chōfu
	Rei Hirakawa (yellow card) 18'	Report	Léo Ceará 42', 50'; Ryoya Ogawa (yellow card) 8'; Rikuto Hirose (yellow card) 17'; Matheus Bueno (yellow card) 37'	Stadium: Ajinomoto Stadium; Attendance: 21,966; Referee: Atsushi Kamimura

2 September 5	Mito HollyHock	4–2	Kashima Antlers	Mito
	Arata Watanabe 9' (pen.), 21', 48', 55'; Kotaro Uchino (yellow card) 70'	Report	Léo Ceará 53', 83'; Tomoki Hayakawa (yellow card) 5'	Stadium: K's denki Stadium Mito; Attendance: 14,506; Referee: Yuzo Sutani

6 September 6	Kashima Antlers	0–1	Urawa Red Diamonds	Kashima
		Report	Yuma Suzuki 20' (o.g.); Danilo Boza (yellow card) 17'; Tatsuki Seko (yellow card) 42'; Kenta Nemoto (yellow card) 70'	Stadium: Kashima Soccer Stadium; Attendance: 26,589; Referee: Koichiro Fukushima

11 September 7 (Rescheduled)	Vissel Kobe	2–1	Kashima Antlers	Kobe
	Yuya Osako 56' (pen.); Tetsushi Yamakawa 77'; Rikuto Hirose (yellow card) 25'	Report	Aleksandar Čavrić 73'; Keisuke Tsukui (yellow card) 23'; Kento Misao (yellow card) 90'	Stadium: Noevir Stadium Kobe; Attendance: 17,110; Referee: Hiroyuki Kimura

19 September 8	Kawasaki Frontale	3–3	Kashima Antlers	Kawasaki
	Marcinho 45+3'; Tatsuya Ito 54'; Pedro Romano 90+7' (yellow card) 90+7'; Yuki Yamamoto (yellow card) 37'; Derik Lacerda (yellow card) 43'	Report	Léo Ceará 44', 67'; Yuta Matsumura 84'; Toru Oniki (yellow card) 27'; Kento Misao (yellow card) 60'	Stadium: Kawasaki Todoroki Stadium; Attendance: 22,734; Referee: Futoshi Nakamura

9 October 9 (Rescheduled)	Kashima Antlers	2–0	Gamba Osaka	Kashima
	Léo Ceará 45+7'; Yuma Suzuki 60'; Kim Tae-hyeon (yellow card) 55'	Report	Welton Felipe (yellow card) 55'; Ryoya Ogawa (yellow card) 84'	Stadium: Kashima Soccer Stadium; Attendance: 16,240; Referee: Takafumi Mikuriya

17 October 10	Kashima Antlers	2–0	V-Varen Nagasaki	Kashima
	Léo Ceará 2' (pen.); Aleksandar Čavrić 5'; Hitoshi Sogahata (yellow card) 45+3'	Report	Tenmu Matsumoto (yellow card) 24'; Jonathan (yellow card) 43'; Kenshin Yasuda (yellow card) 83'	Stadium: Kashima Soccer Stadium; Attendance: 25,145; Referee: Hiroki Kasahara

21 October 11	Kyoto Sanga	2–2	Kashima Antlers	Kyoto
	Haruki Arai 15', 90+7'; Hiroto Morooka (yellow card) 22'; Takumi Kato (yellow card) 85'	Report	Elber 78'; Yūta Matsumura 90+6'	Stadium: Sanga Stadium by Kyocera; Attendance: 13,011; Referee: Fu Ming (China)

24 October 12	Kashima Antlers	2–3	Kashiwa Reysol	Tokyo
	Homare Tokuda 14'; Aleksandar Čavrić 88'	Report	Keito Endo 35'; Hinata Yamauchi 45+2', 59'; Nobuteru Nakagawa (yellow card) 39'	Stadium: Japan National Stadium; Attendance: 26,729; Referee: Atsushi Kamimura

31 October 13	Kashima Antlers	4–1	Cerezo Osaka	Kashima
	Elber 14', 22'; Matheus Bueno 35'; Aleksandar Čavrić 70'; Leo Ceara (yellow card) 57'; Yuma Suzuki (yellow card) 89'; Ikuma Sekigawa (yellow card) 90+4'	Report	Pablo Sabbag 25' (yellow card) 33'; Travis Takahashi (yellow card) 55'; Javi Hernandez (yellow card) 88'	Stadium: Kashima Soccer Stadium; Attendance: 24,251; Referee: Koki Nagamine

7 November 14	FC Tokyo	2–0	Kashima Antlers	Chōfu
	Motoki Nagakura 60'; Aleksandar Čavrić 90+5' (yellow card) 81' (yellow-red card) 90+6'; Rio Omori (yellow card) 3'; Shuto Nagano (yellow card) 28'	Report	Yuta Higuchi (yellow card) 45+3'; Yuma Suzuki (yellow card) 63'	Stadium: Ajinomoto Stadium; Attendance: 38,076; Referee: Akihiko Ikeuchi

20 November 15	Kashima Antlers	1–1	Shimizu S-Pulse	Kashima
	Léo Ceará 88'	Report	Koya Kitagawa 72'; Ryo Germain (yellow card) 86'	Stadium: Kashima Soccer Stadium; Attendance: 14,759; Referee: Koji Takasaki

16 December 16	Kashima Antlers	–	Machida Zelvia	Kashima
				Stadium: Kashima Soccer Stadium

28 November 17	Kashima Antlers	–	Fagiano Okayama	Kashima
		Report		Stadium: Kashima Soccer Stadium

5-6 December 18	JEF United Chiba	–	Kashima Antlers	Chiba
				Stadium: Fukuda Denshi Arena

12-13 December 19	Sanfrecce Hiroshima	–	Kashima Antlers	Hiroshima
				Stadium: Edion Peace Wing Hiroshima

19 December 20	Kashima Antlers	–	Tokyo Verdy	Tokyo
				Stadium: Japan National Stadium

13-14 February 21	Kashima Antlers	–	Mito HollyHock	Kashima
				Stadium: Kashima Soccer Stadium

20-21 February 22	Urawa Red Diamonds	–	Kashima Antlers	Saitama
				Stadium: Saitama Stadium 2002

27-28 February 23	Fagiano Okayama	–	Kashima Antlers	Okayama
				Stadium: City Light Stadium

6-7 March 24	Kashima Antlers	–	JEF United Chiba	Kashima
				Stadium: Kashima Soccer Stadium

10 March 25	Machida Zelvia	–	Kashima Antlers	Tokyo
				Stadium: Machida GION Stadium

13-14 March 26	Kashima Antlers	–	Sanfrecce Hiroshima	Kashima
				Stadium: Kashima Soccer Stadium

21 March 27	Shimizu S-Pulse	–	Kashima Antlers	Shizuoka
				Stadium: IAI Stadium Nihondaira

3-4 April 28	Kashima Antlers	–	Yokohama F. Marinos	Kashima
				Stadium: Kashima Soccer Stadium

10-11 April 29	Nagoya Grampus	–	Kashima Antlers	Toyota
				Stadium: Toyota Stadium

17-18 April 30	Cerezo Osaka	–	Kashima Antlers	Osaka
				Stadium: Yodoko Sakura Stadium

24-25 April 31	Kashima Antlers	–	Kyoto Sanga	Kashima
				Stadium: Kashima Soccer Stadium

29 April 32	Kashima Antlers	–	Vissel Kobe	Kashima
				Stadium: Kashima Soccer Stadium

3-4 May 33	Gamba Osaka	–	Kashima Antlers	Osaka
				Stadium: Suita City Football Stadium

9 May 34	Kashima Antlers	–	Kawasaki Frontale	Kashima
				Stadium: Kashima Soccer Stadium

15-16 May 35	V-Varen Nagasaki	–	Kashima Antlers	Nagasaki
				Stadium: Peace Stadium Connected by SoftBank

22-23 May 36	Avispa Fukuoka	–	Kashima Antlers	Fukuoka
				Stadium: Best Denki Stadium

29-30 May 37	Kashiwa Reysol	–	Kashima Antlers	Chiba
				Stadium: Sankyo Frontier Kashiwa Stadium

6 June 38	Kashima Antlers	–	FC Tokyo	Kashima
				Stadium: Kashima Soccer Stadium

=== Emperor's Cup ===
26 August Second round	Kashima Antlers	3–0	Atletico Suzuka	Kashima
	Kaito Chida 47' (yellow card) 55'; Aleksandar Čavrić 75'; Léo Ceará 90'; Yugo Okawa (yellow card) 73'	Report		Stadium: Kashima Soccer Stadium; Attendance: 7,229; Referee: Yusuke Ohashi

23 September Rd 3	Kashima Antlers	3–1	Ventforet Kofu	Kashima
	Léo Ceará 34'; Minato Yoshida 54'; Sho Omori 62'	Report	Yukito Murakami 88'; Mendes (yellow card) 58'	Stadium: Kashima Soccer Stadium; Attendance: 11,498; Referee: Koei Koya

9 December Rd of 16	Kashima Antlers	–	Cerezo Osaka	Kashima
				Stadium: Kashima Soccer Stadium

=== J.League Cup ===
11 November Prime Rd QF Leg 1	Yokohama F. Marinos	2–3	Kashima Antlers	Yokohama
	Rio Nitta 20'; Ryo Miyaichi 25' (red card) 31'; Tomoki Kondo (yellow card) 82'	Report	Yuma Suzuki 45+6', 82'; Gaku Shibasaki 65'; Léo Ceará (yellow card) 81'	Stadium: Nissan Stadium; Attendance: 11,593; Referee: Koei Koya

15 November Prime Rd QF Leg 2	Kashima Antlers	3–2	Yokohama F. Marinos	Kashima
	Yuta Matsumura 2'; Naomichi Ueda 56'; Rio Nitta 90+4'; Matheus Bueno (yellow card) 27'; Keisuke Tsukui (yellow card) 38'	Report	Jun Amano 47'; Rio Nitta 86'; Yuta Tanaka (yellow card) 28'; Kosei Suwana (yellow card) 40'	Stadium: Kashima Soccer Stadium; Attendance: 13,813; Referee: Jumpei Iida

Kashima Antlers won 6–4 on aggregate.

24 March Semi Final Leg 1	Kashiwa Reysol	–	Kashima Antlers	Chiba
				Stadium: Sankyo Frontier Kashiwa Stadium

28 March Semi Final Leg 2	Kashima Antlers	–	Kashiwa Reysol	Kashima
				Stadium: Kashima Soccer Stadium

=== AFC Champions League ===
==== League stage ====
Win Draw Loss

Pos	Team	Pld	W	D	L	GF	GA	GD	Pts	Qualification
1	(Japan) Vissel Kobe	4	4	0	0	8	3	+5	12	Advance to round of 16
2	(Japan) Kashima Antlers	4	3	1	0	11	1	+10	10	Advance to round of 16
3	(Japan) Gamba Osaka	4	2	2	0	11	6	+5	8	Advance to round of 16
4	(Japan) Kashiwa Reysol	4	2	1	1	8	3	+5	7	Advance to round of 16
5	(China) Shanghai Port	4	2	1	1	13	10	+3	7	Advance to round of 16

Updated to match(es) played on 4 November 2026. Source: AFC
Rules for classification: 1) points; 2) goal difference; 3) number of goals scored; 4) number of matches won; 5) penalty shoot-out if only two teams remain tied and played each other on the final matchday 6) fair play ranking; 7) drawing of lots

15 September 2026 1	Kashima Antlers (Japan)	7–1	(Australia) Newcastle Jets	Kashima, Japan
	Aleksandar Čavrić 11', 16', 42'; Homare Tokuda 40', 56'; James Delianov 19' (o.g.); Kyosuke Tagawa 73'; Ryoya Ogawa (yellow card) 70'; Kim Tae-hyeon (yellow card) 87'	Report	Patrick Wood 79' (yellow card) 76'	Stadium: Kashima Soccer Stadium; Attendance: 5,761; Referee: Khalid Al-Turais (Saudi Arabia)

13 October 2026 2	Cong An Hanoi (Vietnam)	0–1	(Japan) Kashima Antlers	Hanoi, Vietnam
	Stefan Mauk (yellow card) 25'; Nguyễn Quang Hải (yellow card) 55'; Đoàn Văn Hậu (yellow card) 63'	Report	Nguyễn Adou Leygley Minh 61' (o.g.); Matheus Bueno (yellow card) 25'	Stadium: Hàng Đẫy Stadium; Attendance: 5,168; Referee: Mooud Bonyadifard (Iran)

28 October 2026 3	Kashima Antlers (Japan)	3–0	(South Korea) Pohang Steelers	Kashima, Japan
	Ryuta Koike 69'; Aleksandar Čavrić 75'; Yuma Suzuki 88'	Report	Juninho Rocha (yellow card) 79'; Ji Si-woo (yellow card) 85'	Stadium: Kashima Soccer Stadium; Attendance: 5,676; Referee: Sadullo Gulmurodi (Tajikistan)

4 November 2026 4	Buriram United (Thailand)	0–0	(Japan) Kashima Antlers	Buriram, Thailand
	Kenny Dougall (yellow card) 87'	Report	Haruki Hayashi (yellow card) 63'	Stadium: Chang Arena; Attendance: 18,090; Referee: Nazmi Nasaruddin (Malaysia)

25 November 2026 5	Kashima Antlers (Japan)	–	(South Korea) Jeonbuk Hyundai Motors	Kashima, Japan
				Stadium: Kashima Soccer Stadium

2 December 2026 6	Port (Thailand)	–	(Japan) Kashima Antlers	Pathum Thani, Thailand
				Stadium: Thammasat Stadium

9 February 2027 7	Daejeon Hana Citizen (South Korea)	–	(Japan) Kashima Antlers	Daejeon, South Korea
				Stadium: Daejeon World Cup Stadium

16 February 2027 8	Kashima Antlers (Japan)	–	(Thailand) Ratchaburi	Kashima, Japan
				Stadium: Kashima Soccer Stadium

== Statistics ==
=== Appearances and goals ===
As of 20 November 2026

No.	Pos.	Player	J1 League		Emperor's Cup		J.League Cup		Super Cup		2026–27 AFC Champions League Elite		Total	
No.	Pos.	Player	Apps	Goals	Apps	Goals	Apps	Goals	Apps	Goals	Apps	Goals	Apps	Goals
1	GK	(Japan) Tomoki Hayakawa	15	0	0	0	0	0	0	0	4	0	19	0
2	DF	(Japan) Koki Anzai	0	0	0	0	0	0	0	0	0	0	0	0
3	DF	(South Korea) Kim Tae-hyeon	6+1	0	1	0	0	0	0	0	2	0	10	0
4	DF	(Japan) Kaito Chida	0	0	2	1	1+1	0	0	0	2	0	6	1
5	DF	(Japan) Ikuma Sekigawa	9	1	1	0	1	0	0	0	1	0	12	1
6	MF	(Japan) Kento Misao	8+7	0	2	0	2	0	0	0	3	0	22	0
7	DF	(Japan) Ryoya Ogawa	14+1	0	0+2	0	2	0	0	0	3+1	0	23	0
8	MF	(Brazil) Matheus Bueno	13+2	1	1+1	0	1+1	0	0	0	2+1	0	22	1
9	FW	(Brazil) Léo Ceará	13	13	1+1	2	1+1	0	0	0	1+2	0	20	15
10	MF	(Japan) Gaku Shibasaki	6+8	0	0+1	0	1+1	1	0	0	1+2	0	20	1
11	FW	(Japan) Kyosuke Tagawa	0+1	0	0	0	0	0	0	0	0+1	1	2	1
14	MF	(Japan) Yuta Higuchi	2	0	0	0	0	0	0	0	1	0	3	0
17	FW	(Brazil) Élber	6+2	3	1	0	2	0	0	0	2+1	0	14	3
18	MF	(Brazil) Yan Matheus	2+2	0	1	0	0	0	0	0	1	0	6	0
19	DF	(Japan) Sho Omori	1	0	1	1	0	0	0+1	0	0	0	3	1
21	GK	(Japan) Taiki Yamada	0	0	2	0	2	0	0	0	0	0	4	0
23	DF	(Japan) Keisuke Tsukui	8+4	0	1+1	0	1+1	0	0	0	2+1	0	19	0
24	MF	(Japan) Haruki Hayashi	4+8	0	1	0	2	0	0	0	2+1	0	18	0
25	DF	(Japan) Ryuta Koike	2+4	0	0	0	1+1	0	0	0	0+2	1	10	1
27	MF	(Japan) Yūta Matsumura	11+4	2	0+2	0	1+1	1	0	0	2+2	0	23	3
28	DF	(Japan) Yugo Okawa	0	0	1	0	0	0	0	0	1	0	2	0
29	GK	(Japan) Yuji Kajikawa	0	0	0	0	0	0	0	0	0	0	0	0
30	FW	(Japan) Minato Yoshida	5+4	0	2	1	0	0	0+1	0	1	0	13	1
32	DF	(Japan) Matsumoto Haruto	0+3	0	0	0	0+1	0	0	0	1	0	5	0
34	FW	(Japan) Homare Tokuda	3+6	1	0+1	0	0	0	0	0	3+1	2	14	3
35	DF	(Japan) Anthony Udemba Motosuna	0+1	0	1	0	1	0	0	0	2	0	5	0
37	DF	(Japan) Rikuto Hirose	7+2	0	1	0	0	0	0	0	2	0	12	0
38	GK	(Japan) Haruto Fujii	0	0	0	0	0	0	0	0	0	0	0	0
40	FW	(Japan) Yuma Suzuki	13+1	1	1+1	0	1	2	0	0	1+2	1	20	4
55	DF	(Japan) Naomichi Ueda	15	0	0	0	0+1	0	0	0	2	0	18	0
77	FW	(Serbia) Aleksandar Čavrić	2+13	7	1	1	1+1	1	0	0	2+1	4	21	13
Players featured on a match for the team, but left the club mid-season, either permanently or on loan transfer
16	DF	(Japan) Shuhei Mizoguchi	0	0	0	0	0	0	0	0	0	0	0	0
20	MF	(Japan) Yu Funabashi	0	0	0	0	0	0	0	0	0	0	0	0
32	DF	(Japan) Haruto Matsumoto	0	0	0	0	0	0	0	0	0	0	0	0
