= Diego González (footballer, born April 1998) =

Chilean footballer

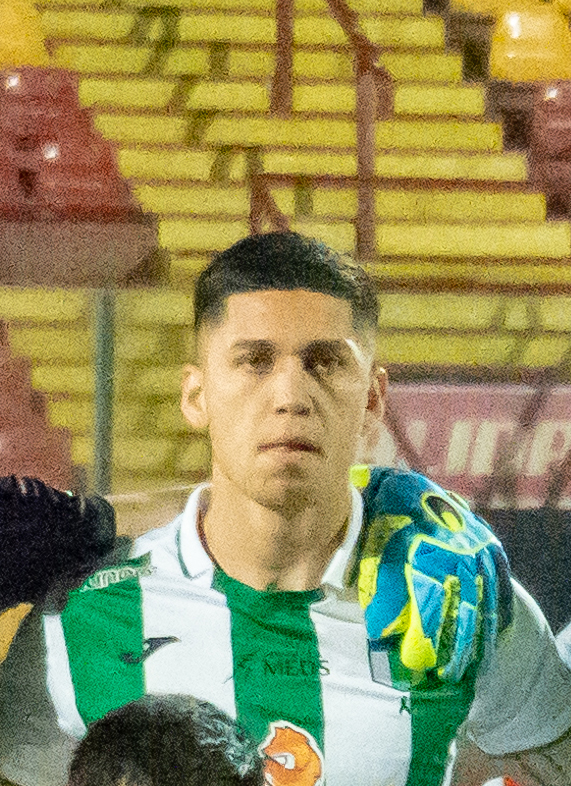
- González with O'Higgins in 2023

Personal information
- Full name: Diego Abraham González Torres
- Date of birth: 29 April 1998 (age 28)
- Place of birth: Rancagua, Chile
- Height: 1.84 m (6 ft 0 in)
- Position: Centre-back

Team information
- Current team: Santiago City

Youth career
- O'Higgins

Senior career*
Years	Team	Apps	(Gls)
2016–2025	O'Higgins	66	(2)
2017	→ Palmeiras (loan)	0	(0)
2019	→ Rangers (loan)	19	(2)
2024	→ Cobreloa (loan)	10	(0)
2024–2025	→ Deportes Santa Cruz (loan)	22	(3)
2026–	Santiago City	0	(0)

International career^{‡}
2014–2015	Chile U17	10	(0)
2017	Chile U20	0	(0)
- * Club domestic league appearances and goals as of 6 March 2026 ‡ National team caps and goals as of 26 January 2017

Diego Abraham González Torres (born 29 April 1998) is a Chilean footballer who plays as a defender for Santiago City.

== Club career ==
González made his professional debut playing for O'Higgins in a Liguilla Pre-Sudamericana match against Santiago Wanderers on May 15, 2016. On 2017 season, he was loaned to Brazilian side Palmeiras on a deal for a year with an option to buy. Later, on 2019 season he was loaned to Primera B side Rangers de Talca.

For the 2024 season, González was loaned to Cobreloa. In the second half of the same year, he switched to Deportes Santa Cruz.

On 31 January 2026, González joined Santiago City.

== International career ==
He represented Chile U17 at the 2014 South American Games, the 2015 South American U-17 Championship and the 2015 FIFA U-17 World Cup. In addition, he was part of the Chile U20 squad for the 2017 South American U-20 Championship, but he didn't make any appearance.

At senior level, on 2019 he was called up to a training microcycle of the Chile senior team.

== Personal life ==
He is the older brother of Moisés González, a professional footballer who began his career playing for O'Higgins along with him.
