= Nacho González (footballer, born 1971) =

Argentine footballer

Personal information
- Full name: Ignacio Carlos González Cavallo
- Date of birth: 17 December 1971 (age 54)
- Place of birth: Sarandí, Argentina
- Height: 1.89 m (6 ft 2 in)
- Position: Goalkeeper

Senior career*
| Years | Team | Apps | (Gls) |
| 1991–1997 | Racing Club | 133 | (8) |
| 1997–1998 | Newell's Old Boys | 16 | (0) |
| 1998–2002 | Las Palmas | 56 | (6) |
| 1999–2000 | → Pachuca (loan) | 17 | (0) |
| 2003 | Estudiantes | 14 | (0) |
| 2004 | Nueva Chicago | 12 | (0) |
| 2005 | Unión Española | 16 | (0) |
| 2006 | Arsenal Sarandí | 6 | (0) |
| 2006–2008 | Las Palmas | 38 | (0) |
| Total | | 308 | (14) |

International career
| 1997–1998 | Argentina | 4 | (0) |

Managerial career
- 2008–2009: Las Palmas (assistant)
- 2010–2011: Lanús (gk coach)
- 2012: Racing Club (gk coach)
- 2012–2014: Racing Club (youth)
- 2013: Racing Club (interim)
- 2017: Atlético Venezuela
- 2017–2018: All Boys
- * Club domestic league appearances and goals

Ignacio 'Nacho' Carlos González Cavallo (born 17 December 1971) is an Argentine retired footballer who played as a goalkeeper.

== Club career ==
Born in Sarandí, Buenos Aires, González started his professional career in 1991 with Racing Club de Avellaneda, where he spent six seasons in the Argentine Primera División. Towards the end of his time with the club, he earned a reputation as an excellent penalty taker.

In 1997, González joined Newell's Old Boys of Rosario and, the following year, moved to Spain's UD Las Palmas. After being backup in his first season, spent in Segunda División, and serving a loan in Mexico with C.F. Pachuca (being part of the squad that won the Invierno 1999 tournament), he became the starter, scoring four goals in the 2001–02 campaign but with the Canary Islands team being relegated from La Liga, with the keeper finding the net through penalties.

In 2003, González returned to Argentina where he played for Estudiantes de La Plata and Club Atlético Nueva Chicago also in the top flight. Two years later he was part of the Unión Española team that won the Chilean Apertura in 2005 and, the following season, played six matches with local side Arsenal de Sarandí.

During a 2005 match for Unión Española against Unión San Felipe, González received his second yellow card and was consequently ejected by Enrique Osses. Upset by this, he hit the referee in the face knocking him over, and afterwards was held in police custody for two hours; he faced a ban of up to 50 matches, which he did not serve because he left his team to play in Argentina.

González returned for a third spell with Las Palmas, managing to compete a further two seasons in the second level and announcing his retirement in June 2008, at the age of 36.

== International career ==
During a one-year span, González appeared four times for Argentina, being picked for the final squad at the 1997 Copa América.

== Personal life ==
He is the father of the also football goalkeeper Alan González.

== Honours ==
=== Player ===
Pachuca

- Liga MX: Invierno 1999

Unión Española

- Primera División de Chile: 2005 Apertura
