= Gerardo Mascareño =

Mexican football manager

Personal information
- Full name: Gerardo Luis Mascareño Zárate
- Date of birth: 4 July 1970 (age 56)
- Place of birth: Silver Spring, Maryland, United States
- Height: 1.73 m (5 ft 8 in)
- Position: Forward

Senior career*
Years	Team	Apps	(Gls)
1988–1989	Los Angeles Lazers		
1990–1994	Puebla	33	(4)
1994–1995	Atlante	15	(0)
1995–1997	Atlas	68	(16)
1998	Guadalajara	10	(1)
1998–2000	Pachuca	57	(11)
2000–2001	Morelia	27	(3)
2002	León	5	(0)
2002–2003	Nacional Tijuana	11	(1)

International career
1996	Mexico	1	(0)

Managerial career
- 2007–2008: Pachuca Juniors (Assistant)
- 2008: Unión de Curtidores (Assistant)
- 2016–2017: Sinaloa (assistant)
- 2018: Tapachula (assistant)
- 2018–2020: Juárez (assistant)
- 2022–2023: Mazatlán (assistant)
- * Club domestic league appearances and goals

Gerardo Luis Mascareño Zárate (born 4 July 1970) is a Mexican former professional footballer and manager who last played for Nacional Tijuana. Born in the United States, he played for the Mexico national team.

== Early life ==
Born in the U.S. state of Maryland his father was mastering in dental medicine while his mother was working at the Inter-American Development Bank in Washington, D.C. Mascareño moved to the Mexican city of León, Guanajuato in less than a year after his birth, residing there until age 16.

== Club career ==
Mascareño began his career as a professional football player with Los Angeles Lazers and was discovered early on by Mexican talent scouts. As early as 1990 he played in the top Mexican league. He spent his first four years at Club Puebla, who had won the double shortly before he arrived. Through Atlante F.C. and the two city rivals Atlas and Chivas based in Guadalajara, he joined C.F. Pachuca in 1998, with whom he won the Mexican football championship in the 1999 winter season. He then played for Monarcas Morelia and Club León, with whom he was relegated to the second division in 2002. He then ended his active career in the 2002/03 season with the second division team Nacional Tijuana.

== Mexican national team ==
In 1996, then national team manager Bora Milutinović called-up Mascareño and made one appearance for the Mexico national football team on October 23, 1996, coming on for Zague in a 0–1 loss against Ecuador. This match would be his sole appearance with Mexico.

== Coaching career ==
Mascareño started his coaching career in 2007 with Pachuca Juniors. Since then he has been part of the technical staffs of Sinaloa, Tapachula, Juárez and Mazatlán, being a frequent collaborator of Gabriel Caballero.

== Honours ==
Pachuca

- Mexican Primera División: Invierno 1999
