= Moisés González =

Chilean footballer (born 2000)

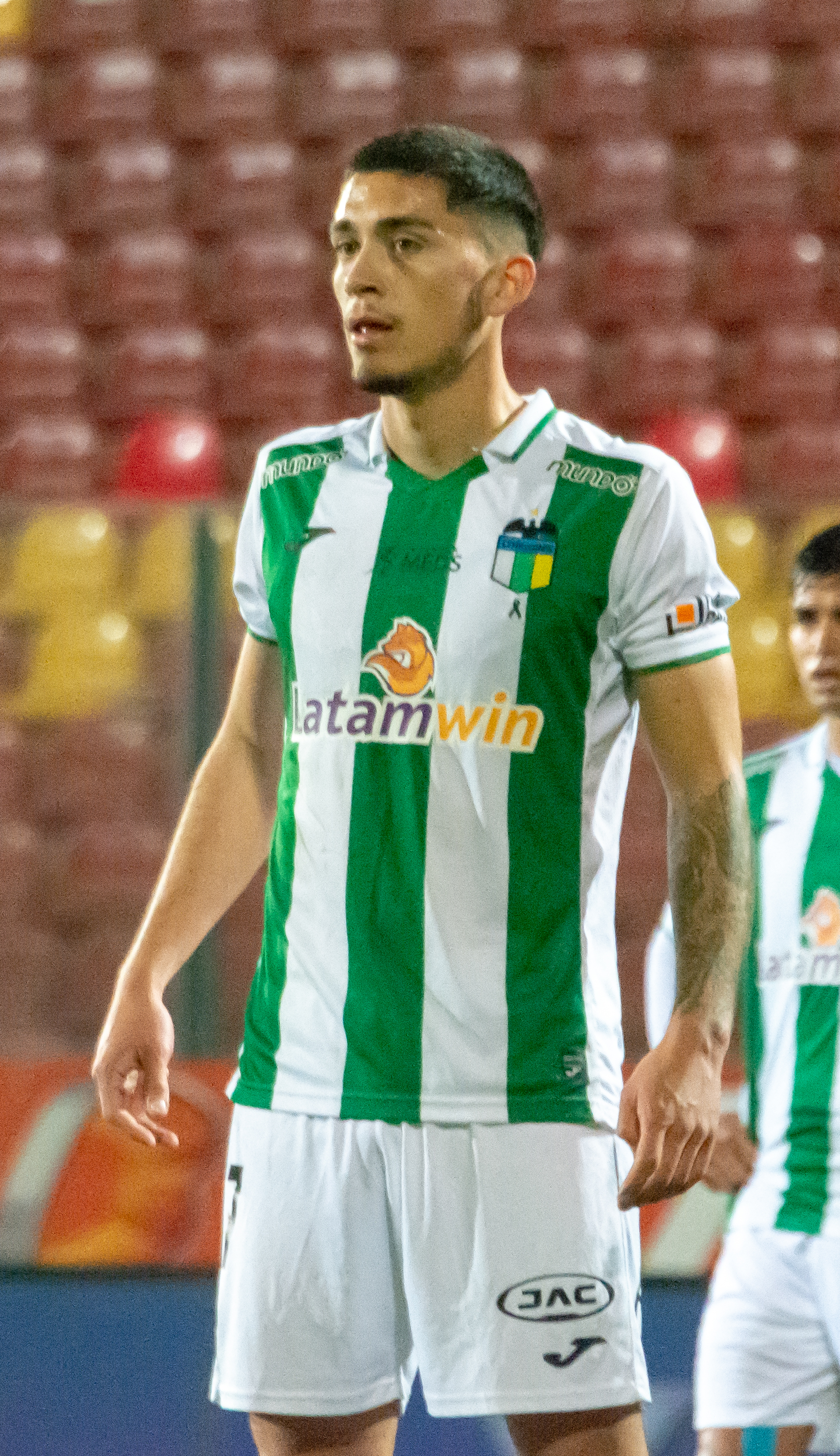
- González with O'Higgins in 2023

Personal information
- Full name: Moisés Alejandro González Torres
- Date of birth: 22 November 2000 (age 25)
- Place of birth: Rancagua, Chile
- Height: 1.79 m (5 ft 10 in)
- Position: Defender

Team information
- Current team: Universidad de Concepción

Youth career
- 2011–2019: O'Higgins

Senior career*
Years	Team	Apps	(Gls)
2020–2025	O'Higgins	106	(3)
2026–	Universidad de Concepción	0	(0)

International career
2017	Chile U17		
- * Club domestic league appearances and goals as of 20 December 2025

Moisés Alejandro González Torres (born 22 November 2000) is a Chilean professional footballer who plays as a defender for Universidad de Concepción.

== Club career ==
González joined the O'Higgins youth system in 2011 after taking part in a massive trial in the Estadio Municipal Guillermo Saavedra. He made his professional debut in a Chilean Primera División match against Deportes Antofagasta on 30 August 2020, by replacing Paulo Magalhães. He scored his first goal against Audax Italiano on 6 March 2022. He ended his contract in December 2025.

On 22 December 2025, González signed with Universidad de Concepción.

== International career ==
González has taken part of the Chile national team at under-17 level. He also has been with the Chile under-23 squad in training microcycles.

At senior level, he received his first call up for the 2026 FIFA World Cup qualifiers against Uruguay and Colombia in September 2023, alongside his teammates Diego Carreño and Antonio Díaz.

== Style of play ==
A versatile defender, Gonzalez mainly plays as a centre-back, but he can play as a right-back or defensive midfielder.

== Personal life ==
He is the younger brother of Diego González, a Chile international at under-17 level and a teammate in O'Higgins. They coincided by first time in an official match on 4 September 2020, playing against Deportes La Serena. In addition, their cousins, Joaquín and Francisco Escobar Torres, have been in the O'Higgins youth ranks.
