= Jaime Ordiales =

Mexican footballer (born 1963)

Personal information
- Full name: José Jaime Ordiales Domínguez
- Date of birth: 23 December 1963 (age 62)
- Place of birth: Mexico City, Mexico
- Height: 1.74 m (5 ft 8 1/2 in)
- Position: Midfielder

Senior career*
Years	Team	Apps	(Gls)
1982–1985	Necaxa	58	(1)
1985–1987	Deportivo Neza	52	(13)
1987–1989	Cruz Azul	55	(9)
1989–1992	Guadalajara	94	(3)
1992–1993	Puebla	23	(1)
1993–1995	Tecos	64	(1)
1995–1996	León	30	(2)
1996–1998	Toluca	41	(2)
1998–2001	León	95	(6)
2002	La Piedad		
2002–2003	Pachuca	5	(0)
Total		541	(38)

International career
1991–1998	Mexico	21	(2)

Managerial career
- 2008: Tecos
- 2012–2013: Necaxa
- 2015: Querétaro (assistant)
- 2017: Correcaminos UAT
- * Club domestic league appearances and goals

José Jaime Ordiales Domínguez (Note: In this Spanish name, the first or paternal surname is Ordiales and the second or maternal family name is Domínguez.) (born 23 December 1963) is a Mexican former professional footballer who played as a midfielder.

He was a member of the Mexico national team at the 1998 FIFA World Cup, and played two games at the tournament at age 35.

He was named as manager of Tecos UAG in January 2008. He was fired on 9 March 2008 and replaced by José Luis Trejo. In July 2008, Ordiales became the Sports Director of Club América from Mexico. He served as the coach of second division team Correcaminos UAT. In 2020, he was named the president of Cruz Azul.
