= Pablo Hernán Gómez =

Argentine footballer

- Gómez during his tenure on Pachuca

Personal information
- Full name: Pablo Hernán Gómez Manzanella
- Date of birth: 20 December 1977
- Place of birth: Las Heras, Mendoza, Argentina
- Date of death: 29 January 2001 (aged 23)
- Place of death: Ixmiquilpan, Mexico
- Height: 1.65 m (5 ft 5 in)
- Position: Striker

Youth career
- 1995–1996: Huracán de Las Heras

Senior career*
Years	Team	Apps	(Gls)
1996–1997	Godoy Cruz	32	(6)
1997	Argentinos Juniors	12	(3)
1998	Atlético Morelia	13	(0)
1998	→ Veracruz (loan)		
1999–2001	Pachuca	79	(21)
- * Club domestic league appearances and goals

Pablo Hernán Gómez Manzanella (20 December 1977 – 29 January 2001) was an Argentine football striker who most notably played in Mexico for Pachuca.

== Career ==
Born in Las Heras, Mendoza, Gómez began playing football as a striker in the local Mendoza state league with Huracán de Las Heras at age 17. He joined local side Godoy Cruz Antonio Tomba in 1996, before he had a brief stint with Argentine Primera División side Argentinos Juniors during the 1997 Apertura tournament.

In 1998, Goméz moved abroad at age 21, joining Mexican Primera División side Monarcas Morelia. He made his Primera debut in 1998, but soon fell out of favor with the Morelia's manager at the time, Tomás Boy. He was loaned to Primera A side Tiburones Rojos de Veracruz, where he scored more than 10 goals in one season before Primera club C.F. Pachuca signed him in 1999. Gómez was an important member of Pachuca's squad, scoring six goals in the playoffs, helping the club win its first league title in 1999.

== Death ==
On 29 January 2001, Gómez died with his wife in a traffic accident. He was returning with his family from a weekend in San Luis Potosí when his car crashed on the highway near Ixmiquilpan.

== Legacy ==
Gómez' son, Pablo Jr is also a professional footballer, and currently plays for Mexican side Club Puebla.
