= Edson Zwaricz =

Brazilian footballer (born 1971)

Personal information
- Full name: Edson Luis Zwaricz
- Date of birth: 4 July 1971 (age 55)
- Place of birth: União da Vitória, Brazil
- Height: 1.78 m (5 ft 10 in)
- Position: Striker

Senior career*
Years	Team	Apps	(Gls)
1988	Pinheiros-PR		
1992	Paraná Clube		
1993	Platinense-PR		
1993–1995	Tecos	21	(1)
1998	Monterrey	28	(6)
2002–2007	Alacranes		
2005	→ Dorados (loan)	6	(0)
2007–2008	Lobos		
2008–2009	Socio Águila		
2009–2010	Mérida		
- * Club domestic league appearances and goals

Edson Luis Zwaricz (born 4 July 1971) is a Brazilian former footballer who played for clubs in Brazil and Mexico.

== Career ==
Born in União da Vitória, Zwaricz began playing professional football as a striker with Esporte Clube Pinheiros (PR) at age 17. He also played for local sides Paraná Clube and Platinense-PR. In 1993, he moved to Mexico to play for Tecos de la UAG, where he won the 1993–94 Mexican Primera División title. He continued to play in the lower divisions of Mexican football, except for brief stints back in the Primera with C.F. Monterrey and Dorados de Sinaloa, scoring more than 200 goals in his Mexican playing career.

By 2003, Zwaricz was a naturalized Mexican citizen, and was captain of Primera A División side Alacranes de Durango. In June 2008, he joined Socio Águila, America's Primera A affiliate.

== Personal life ==
In October 2017, Zwaricz helped found Asociación Mexicana de Futbolistas (Mexican Footballers Association).

== Honours ==
UAG Tecos

- Mexico Primera Division: 1993–94
