= Jesús Alfaro (Mexican footballer) =

Mexican footballer (born 1968)

Personal information
- Full name: Jesús Salvador Alfaro Coronado
- Date of birth: January 1, 1968 (age 58)
- Place of birth: Ciudad Victoria, Mexico
- Height: 1.80 m (5 ft 11 in)
- Position: Goalkeeper

Senior career*
Years	Team	Apps	(Gls)
1991–1994	UAT	23	(0)
1994–1997	Toluca	17	(0)
1997–1998	UAG	13	(0)
1998–2003	Pachuca	49	(0)
2003–2004	UAT	16	(0)
- * Club domestic league appearances and goals

Jesús Salvador Alfaro Coronado (born 1 January 1968) is a Mexican former footballer who played as a goalkeeper. Currently, he is the goalkeeper coach at Guadalajara. During his career, Alfaro played for Mexican teams UAT, Toluca, UAG and Pachuca.

Alfaro retired in 2005, playing for Correcaminos, the same team of his debut.

== Honours ==
=== Club ===
Pachuca

- Mexican First Division: Invierno 1999, Invierno 2001
