= Marcelo Gonçalves =

Brazilian footballer and executive

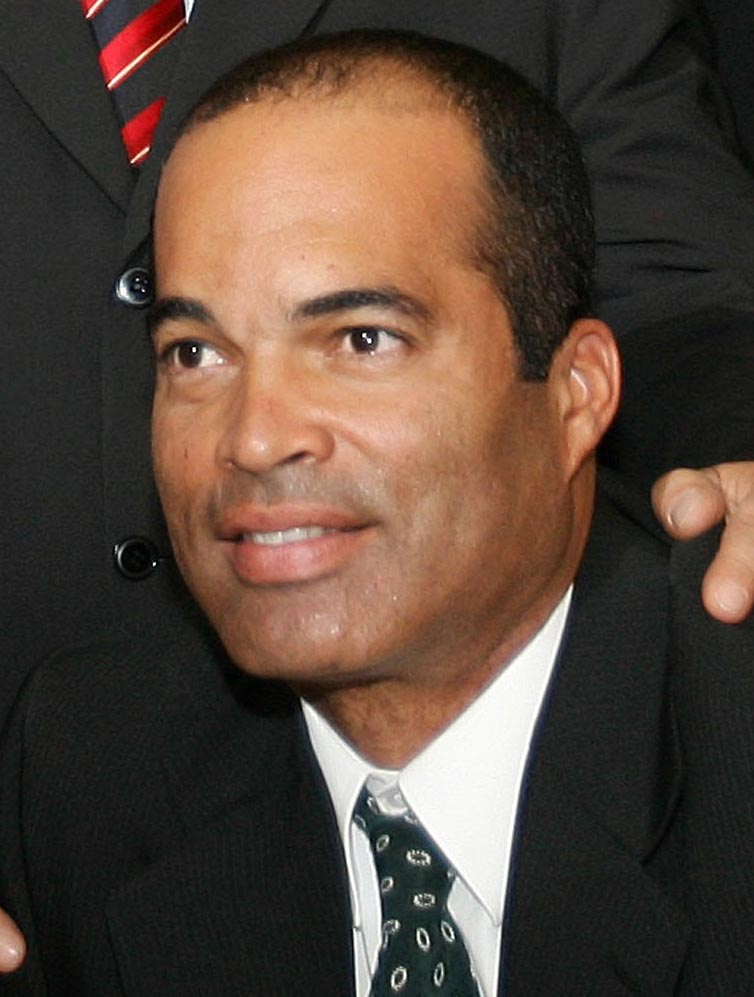
- Gonçalves in 2005

Personal information
- Full name: Marcelo Gonçalves Costa Lopes
- Date of birth: 22 February 1966 (age 60)
- Place of birth: Rio de Janeiro, Brazil
- Height: 1.80 m (5 ft 11 in)
- Position: Centre back

Senior career*
Years	Team	Apps	(Gls)
1987–1988	Flamengo	9	(1)
1988	Santa Cruz		
1989	Flamengo	13	(2)
1989–1990	Botafogo	9	(0)
1990–1995	Tecos UAG	167	(11)
1995–1997	Botafogo	61	(3)
1997	Cruzeiro		
1998	Botafogo	16	(2)
1999	Internacional	10	(0)

International career
1995–1998	Brazil	24	(1)
- * Club domestic league appearances and goals

Marcelo Gonçalves Costa Lopes, usually known simply as Marcelo Gonçalves (born 22 February 1966) is a Brazilian former professional footballer who played as a central defender. He was effective on low balls, and was well known because of his long hair, a recognisable hairstyle which he wore for most of his career, and which he only cut during the 1997 FIFA Confederations Cup, when all the Brazilian players entered the field in the semifinal match with shaved heads.

== Club career ==
Gonçalves was born in Rio de Janeiro, Rio de Janeiro state. He started his career at Flamengo in 1987. However, he rose to fame playing for Botafogo and was first called up to play for the Brazil national team with the latter club.

In addition to playing for Botafogo and Flamengo, Gonçalves also played for Santa Cruz, Cruzeiro, Internacional, and Mexican club Tecos UAG. With Botafogo he won the Brazilian championship in 1995, the Carioca championship in 1990 and in 1997, and the Rio-São Paulo championship in 1998; with Tecos (Universidad Autónoma de Guadalajara), he won the Mexican championship in 1994, and the CONCACAF Cup Winners' Cup in 1995.

He scored the match-winning goal for Botafogo in the club's 1–0 win against Vasco da Gama in the 1997 Taça Guanabara final. Gonçalves also played for Cruzeiro in the club's 2–0 defeat to German side Borussia Dortmund in the 1997 Intercontinental Cup final.

== International career ==
At international level, Gonçalves won the Copa América with the Brazil national team in 1997, as well as the Confederations Cup in the same year. He was mainly a reserve player in Brazil's squad during the 1998 FIFA World Cup, appearing against Norway and Chile, as the team went on to reach the final. In total, he was capped 24 times for Brazil, scoring just one goal.

== After football ==
Gonçalves is currently the executive director of Estácio de Sá, a Rio de Janeiro football club.
