= Sho Omori =

Japanese footballer

Sho Omori 大森 渚生
Personal information
- Date of birth: 19 August 1999 (age 27)
- Place of birth: Tokyo, Japan
- Height: 1.77 m (5 ft 10 in)
- Position: Midfielder

Team information
- Current team: Kashima Antlers
- Number: 19

Youth career
- –2017: Tokyo Verdy

College career
Years	Team	Apps	(Gls)
2018–2021	Nihon University		

Senior career*
Years	Team	Apps	(Gls)
2022–2024	Tochigi SC	104	(2)
2025–2026	Mito HollyHock	64	(3)
2026–	Kashima Antlers	0	(0)
- * Club domestic league appearances and goals as of 11:52, 13 October 2026 (UTC)

Sho Omori (大森 渚生, Omori Sho; born 19 August 1999) is a Japanese footballer currently playing as a midfielder for J1 League club Kashima Antlers.

== Career statistics ==
=== Club ===
As of 13 October 2026.

Appearances and goals by club, season and competition
Club	Season	League			National cup (Note: Includes Emperor's Cup)		Total	
Club	Season	Division	Apps	Goals	Apps	Goals	Apps	Goals
Tochigi SC	2022	J2 League	34	0	3	0	37	0
Tochigi SC	2023	J2 League	36	1	3	0	39	1
Tochigi SC	2024	J2 League	34	1	1	0	35	1
Tochigi SC	Total		104	2	7	0	111	2
Mito HollyHock	2025	J2 League	38	3	1	0	39	3
Mito HollyHock	2026	J1 (100)	19	0	–		19	0
Mito HollyHock	2026–27	J1 League	7	0	0	0	7	0
Mito HollyHock	Total		64	3	1	0	65	3
Kashima Antlers	2026–27	J1 League	0	0	1	1	1	1
Career total			168	5	9	1	177	6
