= Alejandro Glaría =

Argentine footballer (born 1970)

Personal information
- Full name: Alejandro Rubén Glaría González
- Date of birth: 25 August 1970 (age 56)
- Place of birth: Bella Vista, Buenos Aires, Argentina
- Height: 1.73 m (5 ft 8 in)
- Position: Forward

Youth career
- San Lorenzo
- San Miguel

Senior career*
Years	Team	Apps	(Gls)
1989–1990	San Miguel	10	(2)
1990–1991	Santiago Wanderers	44	(16)
1992	Universidad Católica	–	(–)
1992	Alianza Lima	7	(2)
1992–1993	Kimberley MdP	–	(–)
1993	Coquimbo Unido	25	(7)
1994–1995	Cobreloa	65	(43)
1996–1998	Banfield	84	(39)
1998–2000	Pachuca	64	(26)
2000	Puebla	16	(8)
2001	Pumas UNAM	33	(11)
2002	Monarcas Morelia	–	(–)
2002	Chiapas	18	(5)
2003	Tapachula	13	(5)
2003	Talleres	7	(0)
Total		386	(164)
- * Club domestic league appearances and goals

Alejandro Rubén Glaría González (born 25 August 1970) is an Argentine former professional footballer who played as a forward for clubs of Argentina, Chile and Mexico.

== Career ==
Besides Argentina, Glaría played in Chile, Peru and Mexico. In Peru, he made seven appearances and scored two goals for Alianza Lima.

== Personal life ==
Alejandro is the son of the Argentina international footballer Rubén Glaría.

== Post-retirement ==
Glaría became a football agent and a football manager.
