= Javier Aguirre =

Mexican former player and manager (born 1958)

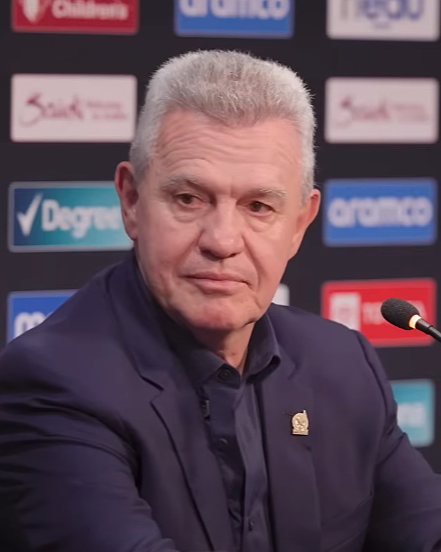
- Aguirre as Mexico manager in 2025

Personal information
- Full name: Javier Aguirre Onaindía
- Date of birth: 1 December 1958 (age 67)
- Place of birth: Mexico City, Mexico
- Height: 1.73 m (5 ft 8 in)
- Position: Midfielder

Team information
- Current team: Valencia (head coach)

Youth career
- América

Senior career*
Years	Team	Apps	(Gls)
1979–1980	América	9	(1)
1980–1981	Los Angeles Aztecs	30	(4)
1981–1984	América	128	(31)
1984–1986	Atlante	31	(3)
1986–1987	Osasuna	13	(0)
1987–1993	Guadalajara	181	(17)
Total		392	(56)

International career
1983–1992	Mexico	59	(14)

Managerial career
- 1995–1996: Atlante
- 1998–2001: Pachuca
- 2001–2002: Mexico
- 2002–2006: Osasuna
- 2006–2009: Atlético Madrid
- 2009–2010: Mexico
- 2010–2011: Zaragoza
- 2012–2014: Espanyol
- 2014–2015: Japan
- 2015–2017: Al-Wahda
- 2018–2019: Egypt
- 2019–2020: Leganés
- 2021–2022: Monterrey
- 2022–2024: Mallorca
- 2024–2026: Mexico
- 2026–: Valencia
Medal record
Men's football
Representing Mexico (as manager)
CONCACAF Nations League
Winner	2025 United States
Copa América
Runner-up	2001 Colombia
CONCACAF Gold Cup
Winner	2009 United States
Winner	2025 United States–Canada
- * Club domestic league appearances and goals

Javier Aguirre Onaindía (Spanish pronunciation: [xaˈβjeɾ aˈɣire]; born 1 December 1958), nicknamed “El Vasco” (lit. 'The Basque'), is a Mexican football manager and former footballer, who is the current head coach of La Liga club Valencia.

As a player, he is best remembered for his time at Club América, where he made his debut and won a Primera División championship, and later at Guadalajara, where he played for six seasons before retiring. On the international stage, he earned 59 caps and represented Mexico at the 1986 FIFA World Cup.

Upon retiring, Aguirre transitioned into management and quickly established a reputation as a tactically flexible and resilient coach. After leading Pachuca to prominence, he took charge of the Mexico national team, guiding them in the 2002 FIFA World Cup, a feat he would repeat at the 2010 and 2026 editions as well.

His managerial career extended well beyond Mexico. He went on to manage seven different clubs in La Liga, including Atlético Madrid, where he consistently achieved top-table finishes and secured regular European qualification. He also guided both Osasuna and Mallorca to Copa del Rey finals. At the international level, he served as head coach of the national teams of Japan and Egypt.

== Early life ==
Aguirre was born in Mexico City on 1 December 1958. He earned the nickname El Vasco due to his parents’ Basque heritage. His mother hailed from Guernica and his father from Ispaster; the couple migrated to Mexico in 1950. Through them, Aguirre qualified for a Spanish passport, a valuable asset that eased his professional career abroad. Reflecting his roots, he gave his three sons traditional Basque names: Iker, Ander, and Iñaki.

== Playing career ==
=== Club ===
Aguirre began his professional career with Club América, making his first-team debut in 1979 before moving to the Los Angeles Aztecs the following year. After a brief stint in the United States, he returned to his former club, where he quickly cemented his place as a regular starter. His second spell with Club América proved highly successful, culminating in the 1983–84 championship title, in which he scored in the decisive final.

Aguirre then joined Atlante, spending two seasons with the club before heading to Spain to sign with Osasuna. His time in La Liga was disrupted by a serious injury that sidelined him for several months, and after just a year abroad, he returned to Mexico to play for Guadalajara. There, he played for six years and made over 100 appearances before bringing his playing career to a close.

=== International ===
Aguirre earned 59 international caps for the Mexico national team between 1983 and 1992, scoring 13 goals. He was a member of the squad at the 1986 FIFA World Cup, held in Mexico, where he appeared in the quarter-final against West Germany. During the game, Aguirre was sent off, becoming the first Mexican player to be dismissed in a World Cup fixture.

== Managerial career ==
=== Early years ===
Following his retirement, Aguirre transitioned into coaching, beginning as a technical assistant to Miguel Mejía Barón with the Mexico national team in the build-up to the 1994 FIFA World Cup. His first steps as a head coach came with Atlante, before moving to Pachuca, where he achieved a landmark success. In the Invierno 1999 tournament, Aguirre guided Pachuca to its first-ever top-flight league championship.

=== First spell with Mexico ===
On 22 June 2001, Aguirre was appointed manager of the Mexico national team, replacing Enrique Meza. The team sat fifth in their qualifying group for the 2002 FIFA World Cup following a 3–1 away defeat to Honduras, part of a dismal run of just one win in 12 matches. In his debut match on 1 July, El Tri defeated the United States at home. Mexico ultimately qualified in second place behind Costa Rica after securing a crucial 3–0 victory over Honduras at the Estadio Azteca on 11 November.

Aguirre coached Mexico at the 2001 Copa América in Colombia, where they beat Brazil, Chile, and Uruguay before losing the final 1–0 to the hosts. The next year, at the 2002 FIFA World Cup, Mexico topped their group after wins over Croatia and Ecuador and a draw with Italy, but were eliminated in the round of 16 by the United States.

=== Osasuna ===
On 6 June 2002, while leading Mexico at the World Cup, Aguirre agreed to coach La Liga club Osasuna after previous manager Miguel Ángel Lotina quit for Celta de Vigo; he had previously played for the Navarrese club. In his first season in Pamplona, the club reached the semi-finals of the Copa del Rey, losing 4–2 on aggregate to Recreativo de Huelva.

In 2004–05, Aguirre went one better, guiding Osasuna to the cup final, where they lost 2–1 after extra time to Real Betis. In the following league season, the Rojillos beat Sevilla FC to a joint-best 4th place and their first qualification to the UEFA Champions League, having led the table after 11 games.

=== Atlético Madrid ===
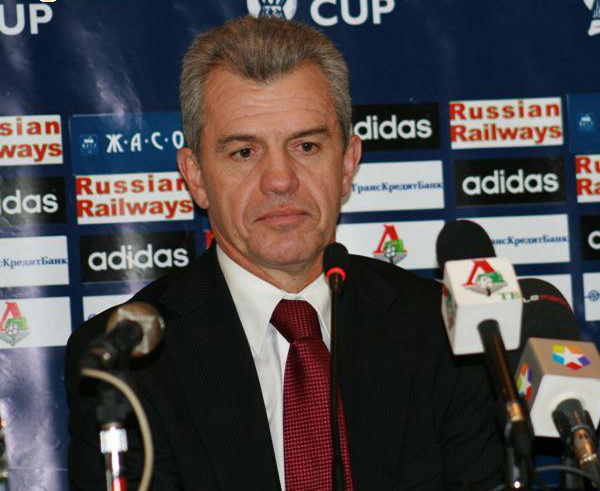
Aguirre as Atlético Madrid manager in 2007

On 24 May 2006, days after Osasuna finished the season in fourth, Aguirre signed a one-year contract to replace Pepe Murcia at Atlético Madrid. After a fourth-place finish in 2008 confirmed a place in the Champions League, he extended his deal by another year.

Aguirre was dismissed from the Vicente Calderón Stadium on 2 February 2009, after a run of two points from five games. He was replaced by the team's former goalkeeper Abel Resino, who arrived from CD Castellón.

=== Second spell with Mexico ===
On 3 April 2009, Aguirre became the new manager of the Mexico national team, replacing Sven-Göran Eriksson. He was officially presented in a press conference two weeks later.

On 6 June, Aguirre debuted in a 2010 FIFA World Cup qualifier against El Salvador, losing 2–1. However, he rebounded four days later with a 2–1 win over Trinidad and Tobago.

On 9 July, Aguirre was ejected in an incident during the 2009 CONCACAF Gold Cup match versus Panama. During a play along the sideline, Aguirre kicked Panamanian player Ricardo Phillips, triggering Phillips to push Aguirre, causing ejections for both Aguirre and Phillips and delaying the match for over 10 minutes due to the refusal of the player from Panama to leave the field. Aguirre apologized to the Mexican fans, media, football players and staff, but never extended such courtesy to Philips or the Panamanian team. He was suspended for three games and the Mexican Football Federation was fined US$25,000 by CONCACAF.

On 26 July, Aguirre led Mexico to its fifth Gold Cup title and its first win against the United States outside of Mexico since 1999. He then led Mexico to a comeback win over the same opposition at the Estadio Azteca on 12 August and followed it up by winning 3–0 in Costa Rica, putting Mexico closer to a qualifying spot for the World Cup that seemed to be an impossible task at the time when Eriksson was sacked. On 10 October, Mexico beat El Salvador in the Estadio Azteca 4–1, qualifying Mexico for the 2010 FIFA World Cup.

In June 2010, Aguirre led Mexico at a FIFA World Cup for the second time. The team finished second in their group, ahead of South Africa and France, but lost 3–1 to Argentina in the round of 16. Aguirre resigned after failing to reach the quarter-finals.

His choices during qualifying and the tournament drew heavy criticism. Journalist José Ramón Fernández labeled him the worst coach at the World Cup after France’s Raymond Domenech. Fans and commentators were frustrated by his reliance on striker Guillermo Franco while leaving Javier Hernández on the bench, and by his refusal to explain these decisions.

During the run up to the World Cup, Aguirre expressed his desire to coach in the Premier League in England, but did not receive any offers.

=== Real Zaragoza ===
On 17 November 2010, Aguirre became the manager of Real Zaragoza. On 29 December 2011, he was relieved of his duties following the club's descent into the relegation spots.

=== Espanyol ===
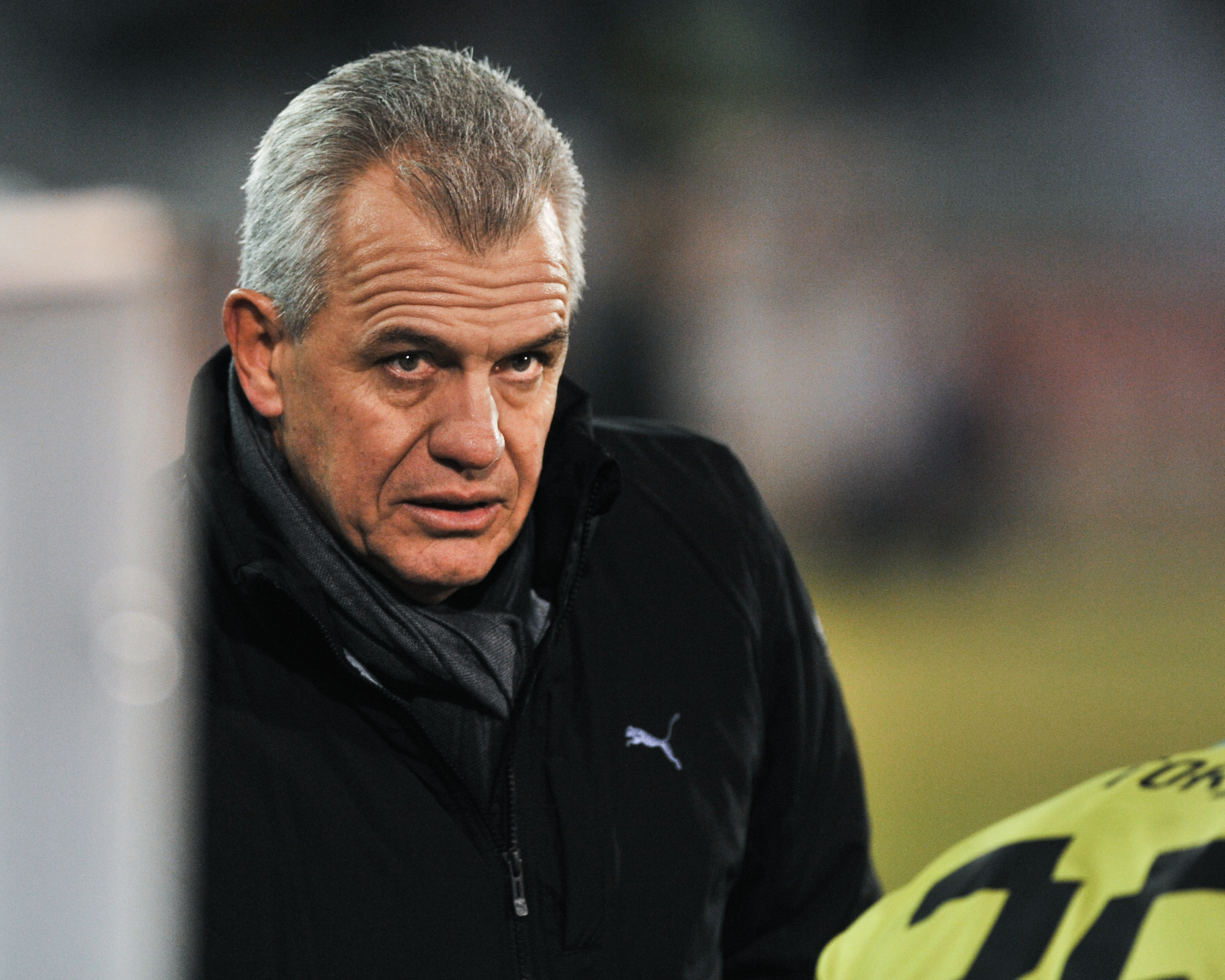
Aguirre managing Espanyol in December 2013

On 28 November 2012, Aguirre was appointed manager of Espanyol, who were 20th in the La Liga table at the time. On 16 May 2014, Aguirre announced his departure.

=== Japan ===
In August 2014, Aguirre became the new manager of the Japan national team, replacing Alberto Zaccheroni, who had resigned following the World Cup. At the 2015 AFC Asian Cup, Japan won all three of its group matches, scoring seven goals and conceding none, though was knocked out in the quarter-final by the United Arab Emirates.

On 3 February 2015, the Japan Football Association announced the termination of Aguirre's contract. This decision followed the confirmation that Spanish anti-corruption investigators had indicted Aguirre for alleged involvement in an ongoing match-fixing investigation.

=== Al Wahda ===
On 18 June 2015, Aguirre was hired as new manager of the Al-Wahda FC from United Arab Emirates. On 21 May 2017, after leading Al Wahda to the President's Cup championship victory, Aguirre decided to step down as manager.

=== Egypt ===
In July 2018, Aguirre was on a four-man shortlist for the vacant Egyptian national team manager job. He was appointed manager in August 2018. During the 2019 Africa Cup of Nations, which was hosted in Egypt, the national team was eliminated by South Africa in the Round of 16. As a result, Aguirre was sacked along with the whole technical and administrative staff of the national team for the disappointing result.

=== Leganés ===
In November 2019, Aguirre returned to La Liga, taking over Leganés after the dismissal of Mauricio Pellegrino. In July 2020, he stepped down from his position after the club was relegated on the final day of the season.

=== Monterrey ===
Although Aguirre had previously stated that his coaching days in Mexican football were behind him, he took the reins of Monterrey in December 2020. On 28 October 2021, Aguirre led Monterrey to the CONCACAF Champions League title with a 1–0 triumph over América in the final. On 26 February 2022, he was dismissed from his position after a run of disappointing results.

=== Mallorca ===
On 24 March 2022, Aguirre returned to La Liga. He joined Mallorca, who were one point above the relegation zone with nine games remaining. Mallorca avoided relegation on the last day of the season.

Aguirre led Mallorca to the Copa del Rey final. They lost to Athletic Bilbao on penalties after a 1–1 draw at the Estadio de La Cartuja in Seville. On 22 May 2024, Aguirre and Mallorca parted ways.

=== Third spell with Mexico ===
In July 2024, the Mexican Football Federation announced Aguirre as the new manager of the national team.

In November 2024, Aguirre was struck by a beer can and injured after his team's 2–0 loss to Honduras in the Nations League quarter-final. Aguirre minimized the incident, choosing instead to congratulate Honduras. The Mexican Football Federation condemned the attack and urged CONCACAF to act, while CONCACAF promised an investigation. Honduras coach Reinaldo Rueda expressed regret over the violence, and FIFA President Gianni Infantino called the incident “horrible” and demanded an investigation.

In March 2025, Aguirre helped Mexico achieve its first Nations League title after defeating Panama 2–1 in the final. In July that year, Aguirre won his second Gold Cup after defeating rivals the United States 2–1 in the final.

On June 11, 2026, Aguirre began his third World Cup campaign in charge of Mexico with a win over South Africa in the inaugural match of the tournament. The team then beat South Korea and the Czech Republic, finishing first in their group and advancing to the round of 32, becoming the first CONCACAF nation to win all group stage matches in a World Cup. Mexico proceeded to defeat Ecuador, their first knockout win in 40 years, but were eliminated by England in the following round. Aguirre stepped down following the conclusion of his contract, with assistant coach Rafael Márquez taking over as head of the team.

=== Valencia ===
On 23 September 2026, Aguirre returned to La Liga, this time as head coach of Valencia, his seventh club in Spain. He took over a side second from bottom after seven matches, signing a contract until 30 June 2027 with the option of a further season.

At his presentation at the Mestalla on 28 September, Aguirre said he had turned down four job offers to spend time with his family, but that "you can never say no to Valencia". He refused to set targets beyond his first match, saying supporters were "tired of messages" and needed a win. Recalling his previous visits to Mestalla as an opposing coach, he joked that he had "almost come to blows" there with Rafael Benítez and Pako Ayestarán.

Aguirre's first three matches brought a 2–2 draw away to Racing de Santander, a goalless home draw with Athletic Bilbao and a 2–1 home defeat to Villarreal.

== Player statistics ==
=== International ===
List of international goals scored by Javier Aguirre
No.	Date	Venue	Opponent	Score	Result	Competition
1	16 August 1984	Helsinki Olympic Stadium, Helsinki, Finland	Finland	1–0	3–0	Friendly
2	21 August 1984	Malmö Stadion, Malmö, Sweden	Sweden	1–0	1–1	Friendly
3	2 March 1985	Estadio Azteca, Mexico City, Mexico	Italy	1–0	1–1	Friendly
4	17 November 1985	Estadio Cuauhtemoc, Puebla City, Mexico	Argentina	1–0	1–1	Friendly
5	19 February 1986	Estadio Azteca, Mexico City, Mexico	Soviet Union	1–0	1–0	Friendly
6	13 April 1986	Los Angeles Memorial Coliseum, Los Angeles, United States	Uruguay	1–0	1–0	Friendly
7	27 April 1986	Estadio Ciudad de los Deportes, Mexico City, Mexico	Canada	1–0	3–0	Friendly

== Managerial statistics ==
As of 21 November 2026

Managerial record by team and tenure
Team	Nat.	From	To	Record								Ref.
Team	Nat.	From	To	G	W	D	L	GF	GA	GD	Win %	Ref.
Atlante	(Mexico)	1 February 1996	30 June 1996	11	2	4	5	12	17	−5	18.18	
Pachuca	(Mexico)	10 September 1998	20 June 2001	121	49	27	45	170	168	+2	40.50	
Mexico	(Mexico)	21 June 2001	1 July 2002	27	17	3	7	40	19	+21	62.96	
Osasuna	(Spain)	1 July 2002	19 May 2006	177	66	49	62	207	221	−14	37.29	
Atlético Madrid	(Spain)	23 May 2006	2 February 2009	131	61	31	39	206	147	+59	46.56	
Mexico	(Mexico)	3 April 2009	30 June 2010	32	19	7	6	60	24	+36	59.38	
Zaragoza	(Spain)	18 November 2010	29 December 2011	45	13	10	22	43	68	−25	28.89	
Espanyol	(Spain)	28 November 2012	27 May 2014	69	22	18	29	79	88	−9	31.88	
Japan	(Japan)	24 July 2014	2 February 2015	10	6	2	2	19	10	+9	60.00	
Al-Wahda	(United Arab Emirates)	18 June 2015	20 May 2017	78	34	21	23	154	108	+46	43.59	
Egypt	(Egypt)	1 August 2018	7 July 2019	12	9	0	3	24	7	+17	75.00	
Leganés	(Spain)	4 November 2019	20 July 2020	30	9	11	10	30	36	−6	30.00	
Monterrey	(Mexico)	7 December 2020	26 February 2022	53	23	17	13	75	44	+31	43.40	
Mallorca	(Spain)	24 March 2022	22 May 2024	97	34	28	35	105	106	−1	35.05	
Mexico	(Mexico)	22 July 2024	7 July 2026	34	21	8	5	55	24	+31	61.76	
Valencia	(Spain)	23 September 2026	present	7	3	2	2	11	7	+4	42.86	
Career total				933	388	238	307	1,289	1,092	+197	41.59	

== Honours ==
=== Player ===
América

- Mexican Primera División: 1983–84

=== Manager ===
Pachuca

- Mexican Primera División: Invierno 1999

Osasuna

- Copa del Rey runner-up: 2004–05

Al-Wahda

- UAE President's Cup: 2016–17
- UAE League Cup: 2015–16

Monterrey

- CONCACAF Champions League: 2021

Mallorca

- Copa del Rey runner-up: 2023–24

Mexico

- CONCACAF Gold Cup: 2009, 2025
- CONCACAF Nations League: 2024–25
- Copa América runner-up: 2001

Individual

- IFFHS CONCACAF Best Club Manager: 2021
- IFFHS CONCACAF Best XI Manager: 2021
