= Mauricio Gallaga =

Mexican footballer and manager (born 1972)

Personal information
- Full name: Mauricio Gallaga Valdés
- Date of birth: 16 July 1972 (age 54)
- Place of birth: Irapuato, Guanajuato, Mexico
- Height: 1.68 m (5 ft 6 in)
- Position: Midfielder

Senior career*
Years	Team	Apps	(Gls)
1992–2000	Tecos UAG	274	(27)
2000–2001	UANL	36	(1)
2002	Santos Laguna	10	(1)
2002	Celaya	18	(2)
2003	Colibríes de Morelos	18	(2)
2003–2004	Tecos UAG	16	(0)
2005	Tigrillos Broncos	15	(1)

International career
1993–1995	Mexico	8	(0)

Managerial career
- 2007–2015: Tecos Reserves and Academy (Assistant)
- 2015–2016: Zacatecas Premier
- 2016: Tampico Madero (Assistant)
- 2017: Tecos (TDP)
- 2018–2020: América Reserves and Academy (Assistant)
- 2020–2021: América Reserves and Academy
- * Club domestic league appearances and goals

Mauricio Gallaga Valdés (born 16 July 1972), known as Mauricio Gallaga, is a Mexican football manager and former player.
