= Porfirio Jiménez (Mexican footballer) =

Mexican footballer and manager (born 1965)

Personal information
- Full name: Porfirio Jiménez Barrera
- Date of birth: 15 September 1965 (age 61)
- Place of birth: Mexico City, Mexico
- Height: 1.68 m (5 ft 6 in)
- Position: Midfielder

Senior career*
Years	Team	Apps	(Gls)
1986–1992	Cruz Azul	222	(26)
1992–1993	Monterrey	33	(3)
1993–1997	Tecos UAG	82	(9)

Managerial career
- 2011–2017: Cruz Azul Reserves
- 2017–2018: Cruz Azul Premier
- * Club domestic league appearances and goals

Porfirio Jiménez Barrera (born September 15, 1965) is a Mexican football manager and former player.

He was born in Mexico City.
