= Eustacio Rizo =

Mexican footballer (born 1971)

Personal information
- Full name: Eustacio Rizo Escoto
- Date of birth: 30 September 1971 (age 55)
- Place of birth: Arandas, Jalisco, Mexico

Senior career*
Years	Team	Apps	(Gls)
1991–1999	Tecos		
1999	Cruz Azul		
2000	Guadalajara		
2000–2001	Irapuato		
2002	Tiburones Rojos de Veracruz		
2003	Puebla		
2003–2004	Tecos		
2004–2005	Tigrillos Broncos		

International career
1995–1997	Mexico	4	(3)
- * Club domestic league appearances and goals

Eustacio Rizo Escoto (born 30 September 1971) is a Mexican former footballer. He played in four matches for the Mexico national football team from 1995 to 1997. He was also part of Mexico's squad for the 1997 Copa América tournament. At the club level, Rizo debuted with Tecos in 1991.
