= Claudio Suárez =

Mexican footballer (born 1968)

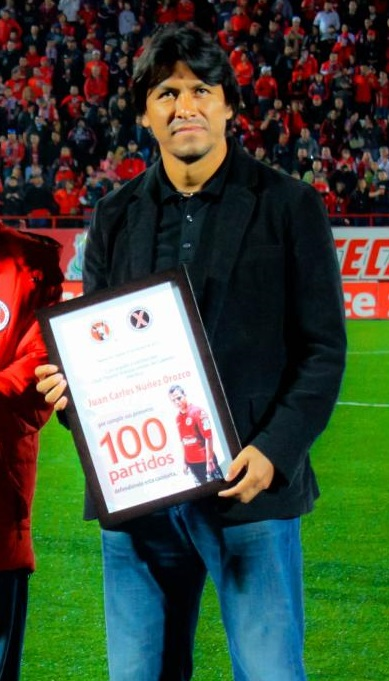
- Suárez in 2012

Personal information
- Full name: Claudio Suárez Sánchez
- Date of birth: 17 December 1968 (age 57)
- Place of birth: Texcoco, Mexico
- Height: 5 ft 10 in (1.78 m)
- Position: Centre-back

Senior career*
Years	Team	Apps	(Gls)
1988–1996	Pumas UNAM	204	(19)
1996–2000	Guadalajara	144	(10)
2000–2005	Tigres UANL	143	(15)
2006–2009	Chivas USA	64	(9)
Total		555	(53)

International career
1996	Mexico Olympic (O.P.)	4	(0)
1992–2006	Mexico	179	(6)
Medal record
Men's football
Representing Mexico
FIFA Confederations Cup
Winner	1999 Mexico
Third place	1995 Saudi Arabia
CONCACAF Gold Cup
Winner	1993 Mexico–United States
Winner	1996 United States
Winner	1998 United States
Copa América
Runner-up	1993 Ecuador
Third place	1997 Bolivia
Third place	1999 Paraguay
- * Club domestic league appearances and goals

Claudio Suárez Sánchez (locally [ˈklawðjo ˈswaɾes ˈsantʃes]; born 17 December 1968) is a Mexican former professional footballer who played as a centre-back. With 177 caps for the Mexico national team, he is regarded as one of the best North American players of all time.

== Club career ==
Born in Texcoco, State of Mexico and nicknamed El Emperador ("The Emperor"), Suárez began his club career with Pumas, where he played from 1988 to 1996 where he became champion in 1991. He moved to Guadalajara as an important piece for the 1996 Apertura, and remained there for 3 years, through the 1999 Clausura where he became champion in the Verano 1997 tournament, and was called to the 1998 FIFA World Cup. After being in the All Mexican Team, as an important and solid defender he was transferred to Tigres.

Suárez then moved on to Tigres, where he played from 1999 to the end of 2005. He led the team's defense during that time, and was league runner-up twice, in 2001 and 2003. His last game with Tigres, and in the Mexico league, was a semi-final Clásico Regiomontano in which he was sent off in a controversial referee decision. Previous to this incident, he already had disagreements with the team's management. Tigres' directive organization had asked Suarez to retire for years and join the management, but Suarez had refused. Other differences in defensive style were also cause for conflict with the team's management. The semi-final was the last excuse for separation.

In 2006, he moved to Major League Soccer to play for Chivas USA.

On 8 March 2009, after negotiations with his contract fell, Suarez announced his retirement. However, on 20 March 2009, he decided to return to professional soccer for another year. He was the last active soccer player left from Mexico's 1994 FIFA World Cup squad until he announced his retirement on 26 March 2010.

On 5 September 2010, Suárez came out of retirement to play for the Carolina Railhawks in an exhibition game with the Pumas Morelos.

== International career ==
Suárez was a member and starter for the senior national team in the 1994 FIFA World Cup in the United States as well as the 1998 FIFA World Cup in France. He missed 2002 FIFA World Cup due to injury before the tournament began, but was picked to go to the 2006 FIFA World Cup in Germany. This FIFA World Cup meant his third World Cup in his career. Despite being picked for the squad he saw no action, but he did wear his legendary number 2 jersey.

He captained the national team for many years and officially represented Mexico 177 times (178 in Mexican record keeping) making him the 2nd player with the most caps in history for the Mexico national football team.

On 25 March 2007, Suárez along with former national team and Chivas USA teammate Ramón Ramírez were honored in a friendly against Paraguay at Estadio Universitario.

He was selected as one of 3 overage players on the Mexico Olympic team at the 1996 Summer Olympics.

== Personal life ==
Suárez resides in Southern California with his wife and three children, and works as a commentator for Fox Deportes.

== Career statistics ==
=== Club ===
Appearances and goals by club, season and competition
Club	Season	League			Cup		North America		Total	
Club	Season	Division	Apps	Goals	Apps	Goals	Apps	Goals	Apps	Goals
Pumas UNAM	1988–89	Mexican Primera División	5	0	2	0	–		7	0
Pumas UNAM	1989–90	Mexican Primera División	17	0	2	0	1	0	20	0
Pumas UNAM	1990–91	Mexican Primera División	40	3	7	2	1	0	48	5
Pumas UNAM	1991–92	Mexican Primera División	40	0	4	0	–		44	0
Pumas UNAM	1992–93	Mexican Primera División	13	4	–		7	0	20	4
Pumas UNAM	1993–94	Mexican Primera División	20	3	–		–		20	3
Pumas UNAM	1994–95	Mexican Primera División	37	4	1	0	–		38	4
Pumas UNAM	1995–96	Mexican Primera División	32	5	1	0	–		33	5
Pumas UNAM	Total		204	19	17	2	9	0	230	21
Guadalajara	1996–97	Mexican Primera División	39	6	4	0	–		43	6
Guadalajara	1997–98	Mexican Primera División	32	1	1	0	12	0	45	1
Guadalajara	1998–99	Mexican Primera División	39	1	4	0	–		43	1
Guadalajara	1999–00	Mexican Primera División	34	2	–		–		34	2
Guadalajara	Total		144	10	9	0	12	0	165	10
Tigres UANL	2000–01	Mexican Primera División	29	3	–		–		29	3
Tigres UANL	2001–02	Mexican Primera División	33	5	–		–		33	5
Tigres UANL	2002–03	Mexican Primera División	18	3	–		–		18	3
Tigres UANL	2003–04	Mexican Primera División	37	1	3	0	–		40	1
Tigres UANL	2004–05	Mexican Primera División	20	3	2	0	2	0	24	3
Tigres UANL	2005–06	Mexican Primera División	6	0	–		–		6	0
Tigres UANL	Total		143	15	5	0	2	0	150	15
Chivas USA	2006	Major League; Soccer	20	6	–		–		20	6
Chivas USA	2007	Major League; Soccer	25	3	–		–		25	3
Chivas USA	2008	Major League; Soccer	14	0	–		2	0	17	0
Chivas USA	2009	Major League; Soccer	5	0	–		2	0	7	0
Chivas USA	Total		64	9	–		4	0	68	9
Career total			555	53	31	2	27	0	613	55

=== International ===
Scores and results list Mexico's goal tally first, score column indicates score after each Suárez goal.

List of international goals scored by Claudio Suárez
No.	Date	Venue	Opponent	Score	Result	Competition
1	8 November 1992	Arnos Vale Stadium, Kingstown, Saint Vincent and the Grenadines	Saint Vincent and the Grenadines	2–0	4–0	1994 FIFA World Cup Qualification
2	22 November 1992	Estadio Azteca, Mexico City, Mexico	Costa Rica	2–0	4–0	1994 FIFA World Cup Qualification
3	14 December 1994	Estadio Azteca, Mexico City, Mexico	Hungary	3–1	5–1	Friendly
4	11 October 1995	Los Angeles Memorial Coliseum, Los Angeles, United States	Saudi Arabia	1–1	2–1	Friendly
5	31 January 2001	Los Angeles Memorial Coliseum, Los Angeles, United States	Colombia	1–0	2–3	Friendly
6	1 May 2001	Estadio Jalisco, Guadalajara, Mexico	Brazil	1–0	3–3	Friendly

== Honours ==
Pumas UNAM

- Mexican Primera División: 1990–91
- Copa Pachuca: 1994
- CONCACAF Champions' Cup: 1989
- Copa Interamericana runner-up: 1989

Guadalajara

- Mexican Primera División: Verano 1997
- Copa Pachuca: 1999
- Copa Pre Libertadores: 1998

Tigres UANL

- Mexican Primera División runner-up: Invierno 2001
- InterLiga: 2005, 2006

Chivas USA

- Supporters' Shield runner-up: 2007
- Western Conference Regular Season: 2007

Mexico

- FIFA Confederations Cup: 1999; third place: 1995
- Copa América runner-up: 1993, 2001; third place: 1997, 1999
- CONCACAF Gold Cup: 1993, 1996, 1998

Individual

- Mexican Primera División Best Defender: 1994–95, 1995–96, 1996–97, Invierno 1999
- FIFA World XI: 1997, 1999, 2000
- CONCACAF Gold Cup Best XI: 1998
- IFFHS CONCACAF 20th Century Men's Dream Team
- FIFA International Football Hall of Fame: 2016
- IFFHS CONCACAF Men's All Time Dream Team
- IFFHS Men's All Time Mexico Dream Team

== See also ==
- List of men's footballers with 100 or more international caps
