= Jorge Campos =

Mexican footballer (born 1966)

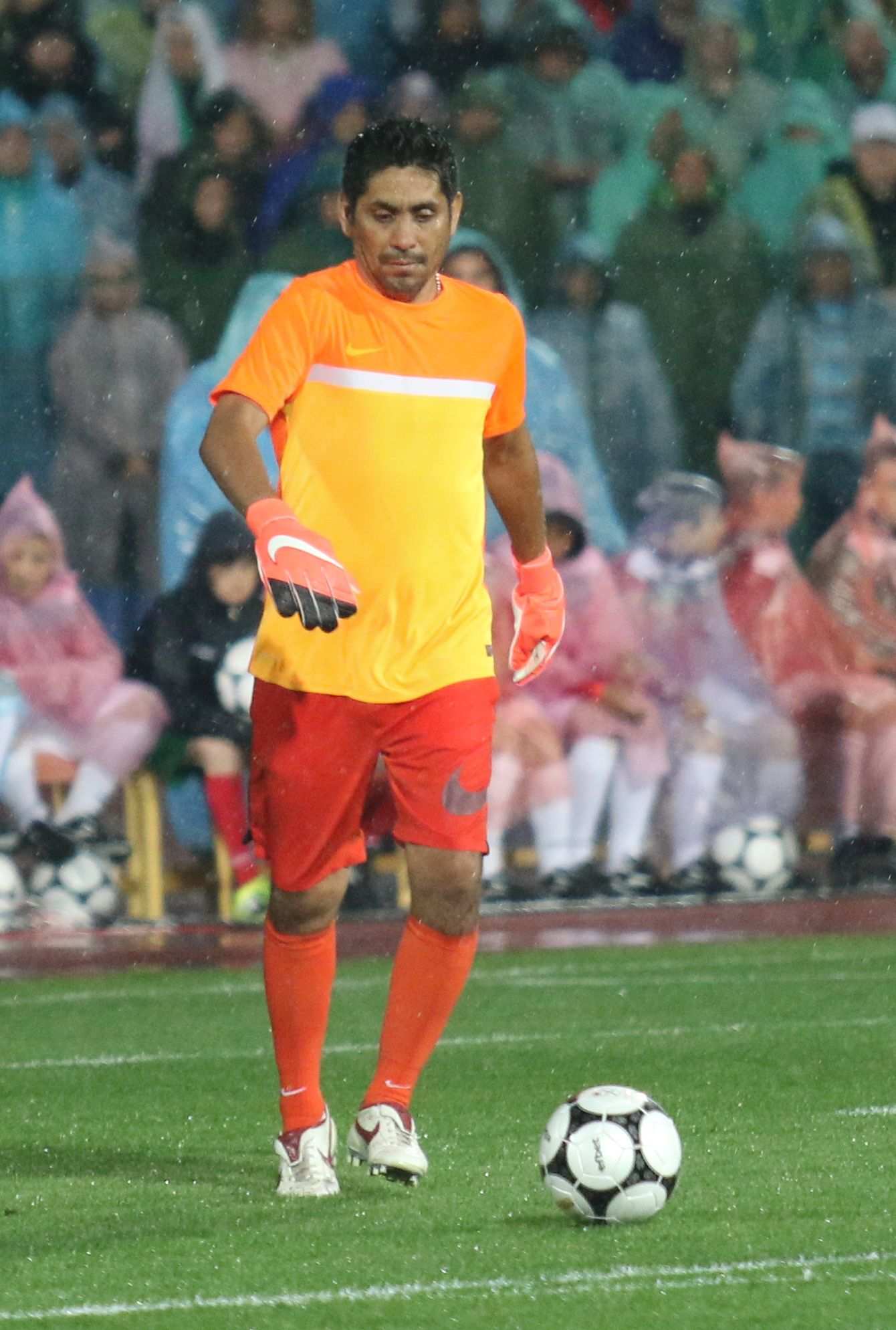

Personal information
- Full name: Jorge Campos Navarrete
- Date of birth: 15 October 1966 (age 60)
- Place of birth: Acapulco, Guerrero, Mexico
- Height: 1.70 m (5 ft 7 in)
- Position: Goalkeeper

Team information
- Current team: México FC

Senior career*
Years	Team	Apps	(Gls)
1988–1995	Pumas UNAM	205	(28)
1995–1996	Atlante	23	(1)
1996	LA Galaxy	24	(0)
1996–1997	Atlante	16	(0)
1997	LA Galaxy	19	(0)
1997	Cruz Azul	2	(0)
1997–1998	Pumas UNAM	10	(0)
1998	Chicago Fire	8	(0)
1998–2000	Pumas UNAM	49	(6)
2000	Tigres UANL	17	(0)
2000–2001	Atlante	26	(0)
2001–2002	Pumas UNAM	33	(0)
2002–2003	Puebla	28	(0)
2025–	México FC	5	(3)

International career
1996	Mexico Olympic (O.P.)	4	(0)
1991–2003	Mexico	129	(0)

Managerial career
- 2004–2006: Mexico (assistant)
Medal record
Men's football
Representing Mexico
FIFA Confederations Cup
Winner	1999 Mexico
Third place	1995 Saudi Arabia
Copa América
Runner-up	1993 Ecuador
Third place	1999 Paraguay
CONCACAF Gold Cup
Winner	1993 Mexico–United States
Winner	1996 United States
- * Club domestic league appearances and goals

Jorge Campos Navarrete (born 15 October 1966) is a Mexican professional football coach and player who plays as a goalkeeper for Tercera Federación – Group 7 club México FC.

A notable player of Mexico in the 1990s and early 2000s, Campos was an eccentric player, known for his constant play outside the penalty area – often functioning as a sweeper-keeper, as well as his acrobatic, risky, and flamboyant style of goalkeeping, and his colourful playing attire. His main strengths as a goalkeeper were his leaping ability, athleticism, and speed when rushing off his line, as well as his ability to organize his defense, which enabled him to overcome his short stature. He is regarded as one of the best goalkeepers of his generation.

Campos also made for an effective striker, an example of versatility that is rarely seen in football. At times, he would start a game in goal, and transfer upfield later in the match, mostly at the club level. In total, he scored 38 goals throughout his career, scoring all but four while playing for Pumas UNAM. His trademark, self-designed bright kits contributed to his popularity.

== Club career ==
Born in Acapulco, Campos started his career in 1988 in Mexico with Pumas UNAM. At that time the club's first string goalkeeper was Adolfo Ríos, so because Campos desired first-team opportunities, he asked to be used as a striker. He performed notably in his first season, scoring 14 goals and contending for the title of top-goal scorer. In the following seasons he earned the position of first-choice goalkeeper and won the 1990–91 championship with Pumas.

He also won the championship with Cruz Azul in the Primera División de México Invierno 1997 (México First Division Winter 1997), although he was the second string goalkeeper to Óscar Pérez. He was regularly used as a substitute striker during this period.

As well as Pumas and Cruz Azul, Campos also played for such clubs Atlante, Tigres, and Puebla. He scored a notable bicycle kick goal for Atlante in the 1997 season. In that game, he started as goalkeeper, but as the forwards were failing to score a goal, the coach replaced a field player with another goalkeeper to send Campos to the attack.

He also played in the United States, where he starred in Major League Soccer's first three seasons for the Los Angeles Galaxy and Chicago Fire. He was the first major foreign star to be signed by the league, and enjoyed considerable popularity in the United States. Campos played in back-to-back matches during a double-header event at the Rose Bowl on 16 June 1996, playing for Mexico against the United States and then the Galaxy against Tampa Bay.

== International career ==
On the international stage, Campos started as goalkeeper for Mexico in two FIFA World Cup tournaments: 1994 and 1998. He was also called up to the 2002 FIFA World Cup but he did not play in the tournament. He would eventually collect 129 caps.

At the 1999 New Year's Cup in Hong Kong, in which Mexico was invited as well as Egypt and Bulgaria, Campos' father was kidnapped in Mexico and Campos returned to Mexico to attend to the matter. Campos was invited several times to play with the Rest of the World Team against clubs like Real Madrid, Barcelona, and AC Milan. His last game with Mexico was in 2004 in a friendly against Tecos.

He was selected as one of 3 overage players on the Mexico Olympic team at the 1996 Summer Olympics.

== Managerial career ==
Campos served as the assistant manager to Ricardo La Volpe during his tenure with Mexico.

== Legacy ==
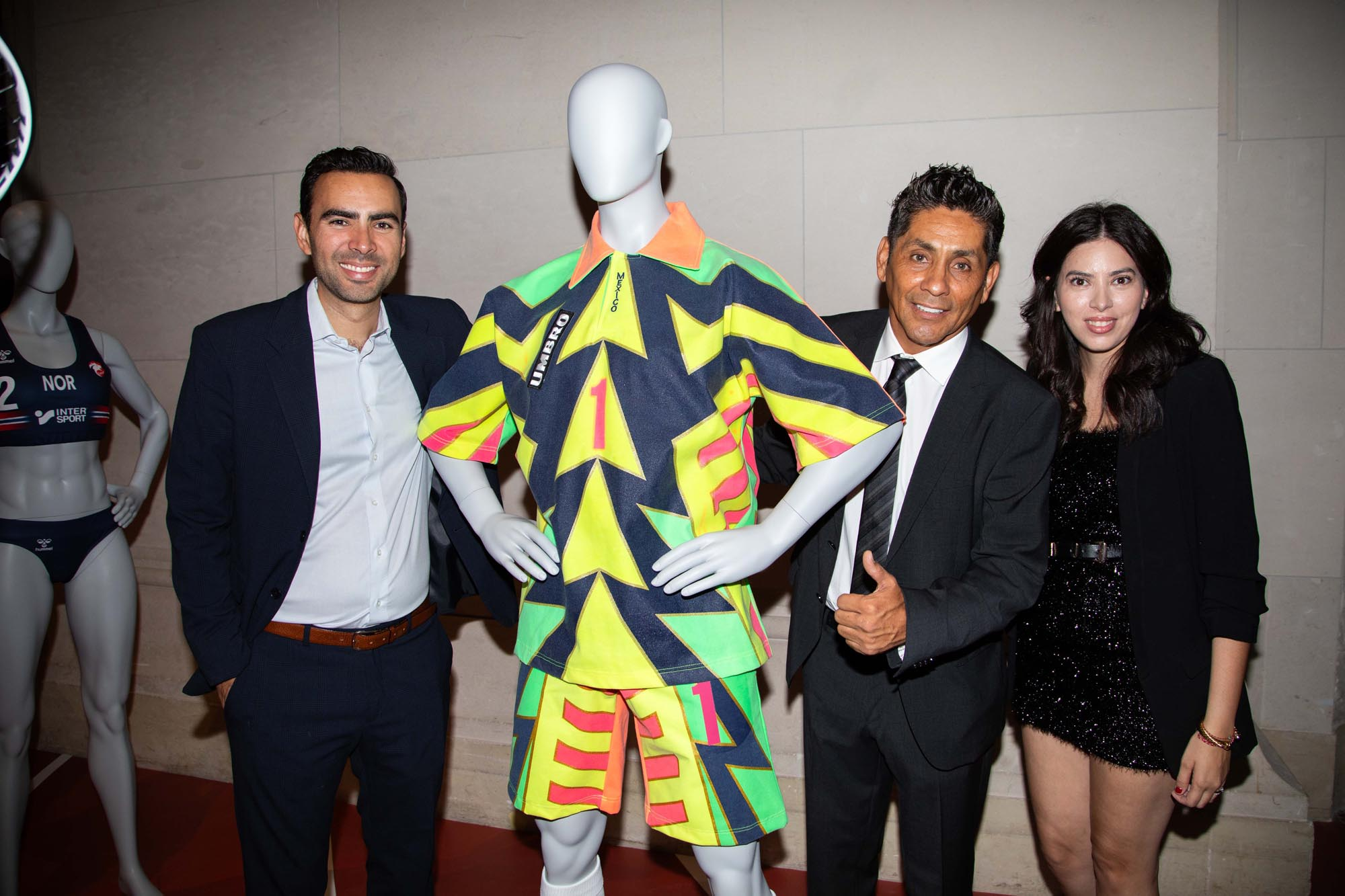
Jorge Campos with his jersey at a Museum of Decorative Arts exhibit in Paris in 2023

Campos has appeared in commercials for the American sportswear company Nike. In 1996, wearing a black jersey (in contrast to the colorful jerseys he wore in games), Campos starred in a Nike commercial titled "Good vs Evil" in a gladiatorial game set in a Roman amphitheatre. Appearing alongside football players from around the world, including Ronaldo, Paolo Maldini, Eric Cantona, Luís Figo and Patrick Kluivert, they defend "the beautiful game" against a team of demonic warriors, before it culminates with Cantona striking the ball and destroying evil.

Campos has appeared in EA Sports' FIFA video game series, featuring in the Classic XI for 2010 FIFA World Cup South Africa, FIFA 11, FIFA 12, FIFA 13, FIFA 15 and FIFA 16. He also appeared in FIFA 23, FC 24 and FC 25's Ultimate Team section, as a FUT Heroes Card.

Campos is also a commentator for TV Azteca.

On 26 July 2024, Campos was the honorary captain for a match in Toronto between York United FC and Atlético Ottawa.

== Career statistics ==
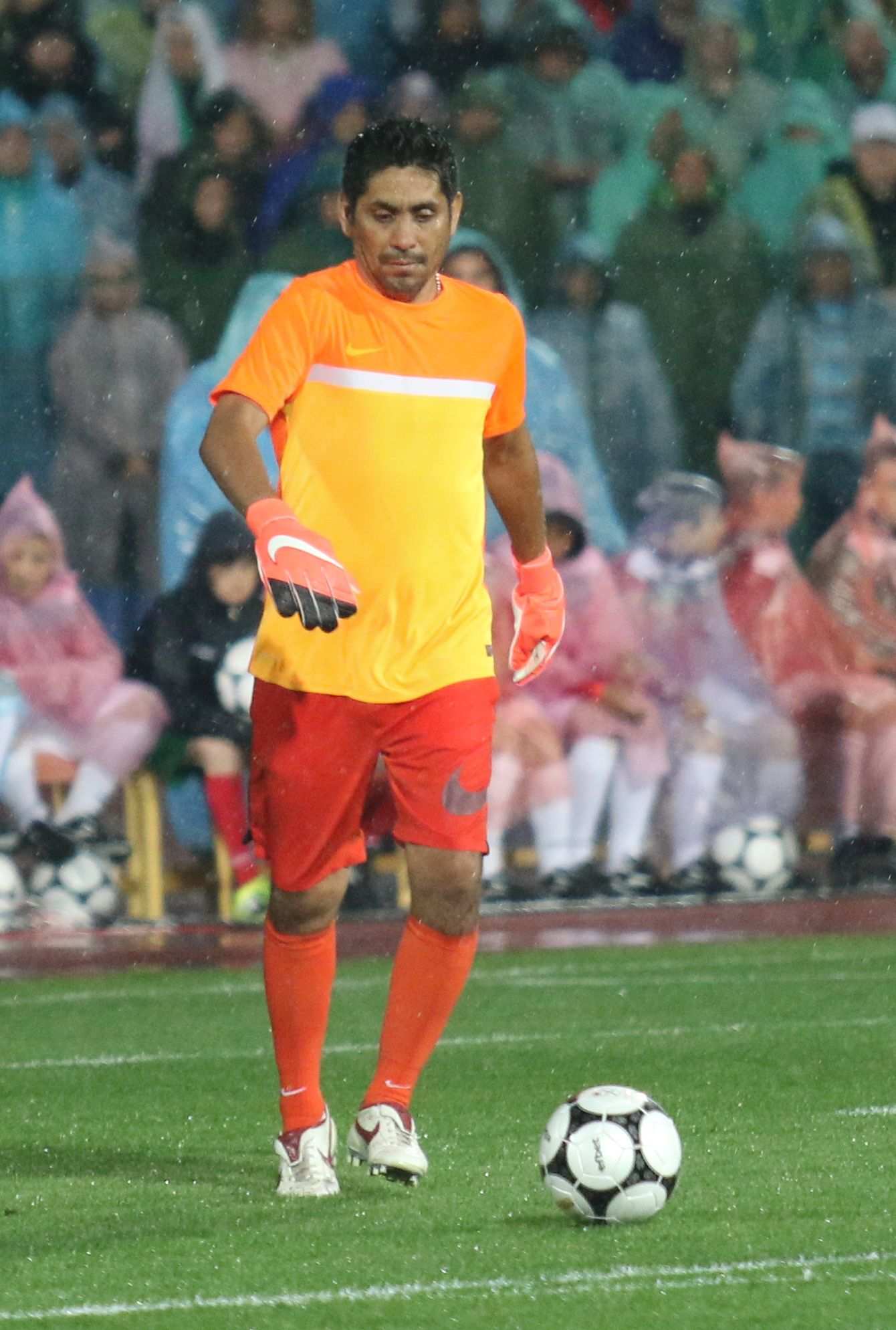
Campos in 2016

=== Club ===
Appearances and goals by club, season and competition
Club	Season	League			National cup (Note: Includes Open Cup.)		League cup		North America		Total	
Club	Season	Division	Apps	Goals	Apps	Goals	Apps	Goals	Apps	Goals	Apps	Goals
Pumas UNAM	1988–89	Mexican Primera División	7	0	8	0					15	0
Pumas UNAM	1989–90	Mexican Primera División	40	14	2	1			10	7	52	22
Pumas UNAM	1990–91	Mexican Primera División	44	2	8	4					52	6
Pumas UNAM	1991–92	Mexican Primera División	37	3	6	0					43	3
Pumas UNAM	1992–93	Mexican Primera División	7	1							7	1
Pumas UNAM	1993–94	Mexican Primera División	34	2							34	2
Pumas UNAM	1994–95	Mexican Primera División	36	6	1	0					37	6
Pumas UNAM	Total		205	28	25	5			10	7	240	40
Atlante	1995–96	Mexican Primera División	23	1	1	0					24	1
LA Galaxy	1996	Major League Soccer	24	0			6	0			30	0
Atlante	1996–97	Mexican Primera División	16	0	8	0					24	0
LA Galaxy	1997	Major League Soccer	19	0					3	1	22	1
Cruz Azul	1997–98	Mexican Primera División	2	0							2	0
Pumas UNAM	1997–98	Mexican Primera División	10	0							10	0
Chicago Fire	1998	Major League Soccer	8	0	1	0					9	0
Pumas UNAM	1998–99	Mexican Primera División	33	6							33	6
Pumas UNAM	1999–2000	Mexican Primera División	16	0							16	0
Pumas UNAM	Total		49	6							49	6
Tigres UANL	1999-00	Mexican Primera División	17	0							17	0
Atlante	2000–01	Mexican Primera División	26	0							26	0
Pumas UNAM	2001–02	Mexican Primera División	33	0							33	0
Puebla	2002–03	Mexican Primera División	26	0							26	0
Puebla	2003–04	Mexican Primera División	2	0							2	0
Puebla	Total		28								28	0
Career total			460	35	35	5	6	0	13	8	514	48

== Honours ==
Pumas UNAM

- Mexican Primera División: 1990–91
- Copa Pachuca: 1994
- CONCACAF Champions' Cup: 1989
- Copa Interamericana runner-up: 1989
- Selectivo Pre Pre Libertadores: 2002
- Copa Pre Libertadores: 2002

LA Galaxy

- MLS Cup runner-up: 1996
- Supporters' Shield runner-up: 1996
- Western Conference Playoffs: 1996
- Western Conference Regular Season: 1996
- CONCACAF Champions Cup runner-up: 1997

Cruz Azul

- Mexican Primera División: Invierno 1997
- Copa México: 1996–97
- Copa Pachuca: 1997
- CONCACAF Champions Cup: 1997

Chicago Fire

- MLS Cup: 1998
- Western Conference Playoffs: 1998
- U.S. Open Cup: 1998

Atlante

- Selectivo Pre Pre Libertadores: 2000

Mexico

- FIFA Confederations Cup: 1999; third place: 1995
- Copa América runner-up: 1993; third place: 1999
- CONCACAF Gold Cup: 1993, 1996

Individual

- CONCACAF Champions' Cup Top Scorer: 1989
- CONCACAF Gold Cup Best Player: 1991
- Mexican Primera División Golden Glove: 1990–91, 1991–92, 1992–93, 1993–94, 1994–95
- IFFHS World's Best Goalkeeper Bronze Glove: 1993
- RSSSF Player of the Year Nomination: 1993, 1996
- FIFA World Stars: 1993
- MLS All-Star: 1996, 1997, 1998
- LA Galaxy Defender of the Year: 1996
- IFFHS World's 10th Best Goalkeeper: 1996
- FIFA World XI: 1995, 1996, 1999, 2004
- LA Galaxy All-time Roster
- Chicago Fire All-time roster
- IFFHS 4th Best North American Goalkeeper of the Century
- IFFHS Best Goalkeepers of the Century
- FIFA Century Club
- FIFA International Football Hall of Fame: 2011
- FIFA World Cup Greatest Goalkeepers Best XI
- Liga MX Career Achievement Award: 2015–16
- MLS ESPN Mexican Players All Time XI
- IFFHS 28th Best Goalkeeper of the 20th Century
- IFFHS 34th Best Goalkeeper of All Time: 1987–2022
- IFFHS The Best Latin American Goalkeepers of the Last 35 Years: 2023
- Thompson Rivers University Honorary Doctorate: 2023
- Musée des Arts Décoratifs Paris: 2023
- York United FC Honorary Captain: 26 July 2024
- FIFA Museum: 2025
- FIFA World Cup The Athletic’s all-time best XI

Records

- Third Highest Scoring Goalkeeper In History
- Highest Scoring Mexican and North American Goalkeeper
- Pumas UNAM Highest Scoring Goalkeeper

== See also ==
- List of men's footballers with 100 or more international caps
- List of goalscoring goalkeepers
