= Oswaldo Sánchez =

Mexican footballer and sports commentator (born 1973)

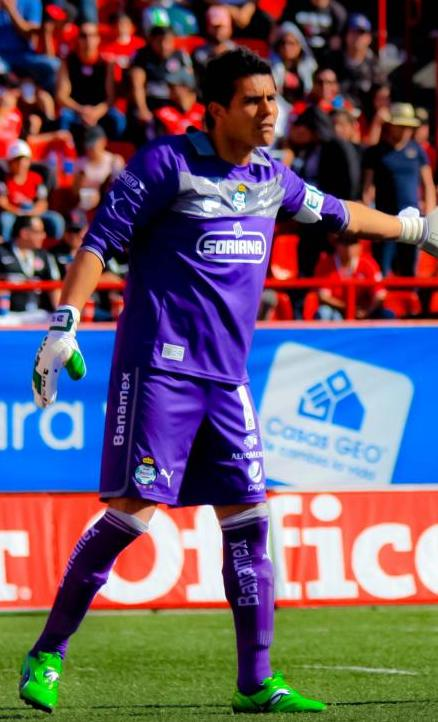
- Sánchez with Santos Laguna in 2012

Personal information
- Full name: Oswaldo Javier Sánchez Ibarra
- Date of birth: 21 September 1973 (age 53)
- Place of birth: Guadalajara, Jalisco, Mexico
- Height: 1.83 m (6 ft 0 in)
- Position: Goalkeeper

Senior career*
Years	Team	Apps	(Gls)
1993–1996	Atlas	81	(0)
1996–1999	América	76	(0)
1999–2006	Guadalajara	271	(0)
2007–2014	Santos Laguna	296	(0)
Total		725	(0)

International career
1993	Mexico U20	4	(0)
1996–2011	Mexico	99	(0)
Medal record
Representing Mexico
Copa América
Runner-up	2001 Colombia
Third place	2007 Venezuela
CONCACAF Gold Cup
Winner	1996 United States
Winner	2003 United States–Mexico
Runner-up	2007 United States
Pan American Games
Silver medal – second place	1995 Mar del Plata
CONCACAF Pre-Olympic Tournament
Winner	1996 Canada
- * Club domestic league appearances and goals

Oswaldo Javier Sánchez Ibarra (Spanish: [osˈβaldo ˈsantʃes]; born 21 September 1973) is a Mexican former professional footballer who played as a goalkeeper and a sports analyst for TUDN. He is highly regarded as one of the best goalkeepers in Mexican footballing history.

At the 2005 FIFA Confederations Cup, despite finishing in fourth place, Sánchez won the Golden Glove.

== Club career ==
=== Early career ===
Oswaldo Sánchez debuted as a substitute when the starting keeper was injured with Atlas at the age of 20 on October 30, 1993, against Veracruz where the teams tied the game at 1–1. Two years after his debut, he was a starter on the team and led Atlas to the Quarterfinals where they were eliminated by C.D. Veracruz. In the summer of 1996, Sánchez was transferred to Club América. The following season, Sánchez was benched and replaced as goalkeeper by Hugo Pineda. Sánchez played three out of 19 games, including the quarterfinals where América was eliminated by Monarcas Morelia. The following season, Sánchez went back into the starting line-up and led América. In the summer of 1999, Sánchez left América for rival Chivas de Guadalajara.

=== Guadalajara ===
At Guadalajara, Sánchez became the team's captain. Sánchez became a key player to Chivas along with other players. This was during the time when Guadalajara were at their best. Sánchez's extraordinary goalkeeping skills and leadership helped Guadalajara reach the finals of the Clausura 2004 season, but Chivas ultimately lost to UNAM via penalty-shootout. Eventually, Sánchez captured his long-awaited league title with Guadalajara during the Apertura 2006 season. After his 2006 championship with Chivas, Sanchez left the club after not being able to reach an agreement on his contract. He decided that the club directors did not want him there anymore and chose to play with Santos Laguna over Tigres UANL. Sánchez scored a goal in the 2000 Copa Merconorte match against Club Deportivo El Nacional of Ecuador, a header from a set piece in injury time to make the final score 3-3.

=== Santos Laguna ===
In 2007, he signed a contract onto Santos Laguna and he has played against his ex-team and ex-team members Chivas de Guadalajara in a 3–2 loss. In the first season with Santos, Sanchez along with his teammates saved the team from relegation. He led them to the Quarterfinals of the Clausura 2007 tournament after coming back from an injury earlier that season. He also led his team to 2nd place in both the Apertura and the Clausura in 2010. Sánchez led the team to win the Clausura 2008 championship and Clausura 2012.

After 21 years, Sánchez retired after the Apertura 2014 season winning the Copa MX in his final season.

== International career ==
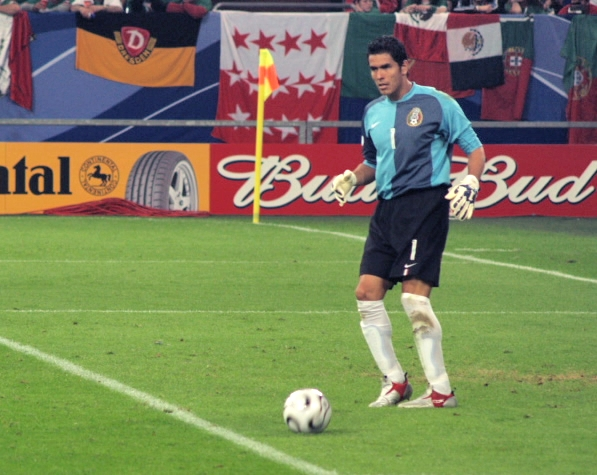
Sánchez playing for Mexico at the 2006 World Cup

Sánchez was called up by Juan de Dios Castillo to participate at the 1993 FIFA World Youth Championship. He made his debut for the senior national team in 1996, against Bolivia. He has been part of three FIFA World Cups, in France 1998, 2002 and 2006. Coach Ricardo La Volpe called up Sánchez once again on April 2, 2006, to be the starting goalkeeper for Mexico in the 2006 FIFA World Cup in Germany. During preparation for the 2006 World Cup, Sánchez' father died of a heart attack on June 7, age 56. Sánchez flew home to Guadalajara, but he returned to Germany in time for the team's first game against Iran, which they won by a score of 3–1.

In 2007, he was called up by coach Hugo Sánchez to play in the Gold Cup and 2007 Copa América. Sánchez was selected to represent Mexico in friendlies against Ghana national team and China national team, his first callup since the 2007 Copa América.

Sánchez was not called up to the World Cup 2010 and did not play a single match for the Mexico national team in 2010. He played his 99th and last international match for Mexico on October 11, 2011, in a 2–1 loss to Brazil. He was substituted by Alfredo Talavera in the 88th minute, marking his official national football retirement.

== Personal life ==
Sánchez appeared on the front cover of the North American edition of the FIFA Football 2005 video game alongside Fernando Morientes and Andriy Shevchenko.

In 2016, Santos Laguna erected a statue of Sánchez.

== Honours ==
Atlas

- Copa México runner-up: 1995–96

América

- Copa Pachuca: 1997
- Selectivo Pre Pre Libertadores: 1999
- Copa Pre Libertadores: 1998, 1999

Guadalajara

- Liga MX: Apertura 2006
- InterLiga: 2005, 2006
- Copa Pachuca: 1999

Santos Laguna

- Liga MX: Clausura 2008, Clausura 2012
- Copa MX: Apertura 2014
- CONCACAF Champions League runner-up: 2011–12, 2012–13

Mexico

- FIFA Confederations Cup: 1999
- Copa América runner-up: 2001; third place: 2007
- CONCACAF Gold Cup: 1996, 2003
- Pan American Games Silver Medal: 1995
- CONCACAF Pre-Olympic Tournament: 1996
- CONCACAF U-20 Tournament: 1992

Individual

- Liga MX Golden Glove: 1995–96, Invierno 2000, Apertura 2002, Clausura 2003, 2003–04, 2004–05, Apertura 2005
- CONCACAF Gold Cup Golden Glove: 2003
- CONCACAF Gold Cup Best XI: 2003
- Liga MX Golden Ball: 2003–04, Apertura 2005
- FIFA Confederations Cup Golden Glove: 2005
- FIFA Confederations Cup Fair Play Trophy: 2005
- IFFHS World's 16th Best Goalkeeper: 2005
- CONCACAF Player of the Year: 2006
- South American Player of the Year: 2006 (15th place)
- IFFHS World's 14th Best Goalkeeper: 2006
- CONCACAF Champions League Golden Glove: 2012–13
- Santos Laguna Honorary Statue: 2016
- FIFA International Football Hall of Fame: 2020

Records

- Goalkeeper with most penalty shots saved in the Liga MX: 25

Sporting positions
Preceded by Joel Sánchez	Guadalajara; Captain; 1999–2006	Succeeded by Ramón Morales
Preceded by Francisco Gabriel de Anda	Santos Laguna; Captain; 2007–2014	Succeeded by Carlos Izquierdoz
