= Óscar Pérez (footballer, born 1973) =

Mexican footballer

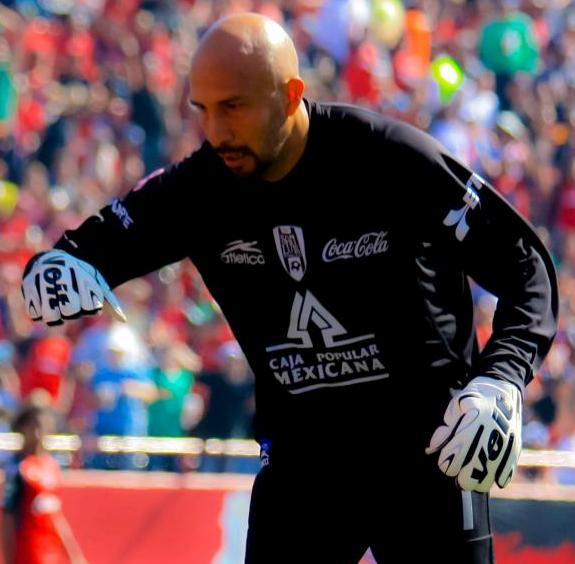
- Pérez with San Luis in 2011

Personal information
- Full name: Óscar Pérez Rojas
- Date of birth: 1 February 1973 (age 53)
- Place of birth: Mexico City, Mexico
- Height: 1.70 m (5 ft 7 in)
- Position: Goalkeeper

Senior career*
Years	Team	Apps	(Gls)
1993–2013	Cruz Azul	416	(1)
2008–2009	→ Tigres UANL (loan)	30	(0)
2009–2010	→ Chiapas (loan)	30	(0)
2010–2011	→ Necaxa (loan)	34	(0)
2011–2013	→ San Luis (loan)	64	(0)
2013–2019	Pachuca	171	(1)
2019	Cruz Azul	1	(0)
Total		746	(2)

International career
1995–1996	Mexico U23	3	(1)
1997–2010	Mexico	55	(0)

Managerial career
- 2019–2023: Cruz Azul (goalkeeping coach)
Medal record
Men's football
Representing Mexico
FIFA Confederations Cup
Winner	1999 Mexico
Copa América
Runner-up	2001 Colombia
Third place	1999 Paraguay
CONCACAF Gold Cup
Winner	1998 United States
Winner	2003 United States–Mexico
Winner	2009 United States
Pan American Games
Silver medal – second place	1995 Mar del Plata	Team
CONCACAF Pre-Olympic Tournament
Winner	1996 Canada
- * Club domestic league appearances and goals

Óscar Pérez Rojas (born 1 February 1973) is a Mexican former professional footballer who played as a goalkeeper. Nicknamed El Conejo (The Rabbit), he is regarded as one of the best goalkeepers in Mexican football history.

With a club career spanning 26 years in Mexico's top flight, most notably with Cruz Azul and Pachuca, Pérez won the CONCACAF Champions League on three occasions, as well as two league titles and one domestic cup. He holds the national record for most league appearances, with 740.

Pérez earned 55 caps for the Mexico national team between 1997 and 2010, winning three CONCACAF Gold Cup titles and the 1999 FIFA Confederations Cup. He also featured in the 1998, 2002 and 2010 editions of the FIFA World Cup, in the two latter as first choice goalkeeper.

== Club career ==
=== Cruz Azul ===
He was the starting goalkeeper for Cruz Azul since 1997 with the team winning the championship in the 1997 Winter Season. Pérez debuted for the team in 1993, facing Atlas, which ended in a 0–0 draw. He quickly became the starting goalkeeper for Cruz Azul and won the 1997 Invierno Final, where Cruz Azul defeated Club León by a score of 2–1.

In 2001, he helped steer Cruz Azul all the way to the final of the Copa Libertadores, a historic run for a Mexican club in the competition. With Pérez in goal, Cruz Azul was able to eliminate teams like Cerro Porteño, River Plate and Rosario Central, before playing Boca Juniors in the two-legged final. In the final, they lost at home, and won in Buenos Aires to take the final to a penalty-shootout but lost 1–3.

In a league game away to Estudiantes Tecos in 2006, Pérez scored a header in stoppage time to salvage a 1–1 draw. In 2007, he was given an award for a record-making 400 appearances at Cruz Azul.

He moved to Tigres UANL, starting 4 games in the Apertura 2008. Pérez's first game with Tigres was on 13 July 2008 in a friendly against his former team, Cruz Azul, which ended in a 1–1 draw. He was a great addition to Tigres as he maintained the fewest goal approaches of the Apertura 2008 tournament.

After a year with Tigres, he moved to Chiapas on loan, where he played in the 2009–10 season.

For the Apertura 2010, Pérez moved to Club Necaxa, after which he joined San Luis on loan.

=== Pachuca ===
For the Apertura 2013, Pérez was loaned to Pachuca after finishing a spell with San Luis. He was given the number 21.

On 29 May 2016, Pérez won the Liga MX final with Pachuca. This broke his personal 19-year drought as well, making him the oldest champion in the league's history at 43-years-old and three months. After the season, Pachuca extended his loan for another year.

On 29 April 2017, Pérez scored a header in the 93rd minute against his former club Cruz Azul to salvage a 2–2 draw, and in doing so at the age of 44, he became the oldest goalscorer in the history of Liga MX. Coincidentally, Azul's goalkeeper, José de Jesús Corona, was the same who conceded Pérez's goal in 2006.

After winning the 2016–17 CONCACAF Champions League with Pachuca, Pérez postponed his retirement until after Pachuca's participation at the 2017 FIFA Club World Cup. On 12 December 2017, he started in the semifinals against Grêmio, becoming, at the age of 44 years and 10 months, the oldest-ever player in the history of the Club World Cup. Following the tournament, Pérez announced he planned on playing professionally for six more months, effectively postponing his retirement until after the 2017–18 Liga MX season.

On 23 July 2019, Pérez returned to his first club, Cruz Azul. On 27 July, at the age of 46, he announced his retirement from football effective immediately after Cruz Azul's second round match of the Torneo Apertura 2019 against Toluca.

== International career ==
Pérez scored his first and only international goal for the under-23 team in a friendly against South Korea under-23, scoring in injury time when Mexico were losing 1–0.

Pérez was considered to be one of the best goalkeepers in Mexico and took over the spot for starting goalie during the 2002 World Cup Qualifiers, going on to play in the 2002 World Cup as the first-choice goalkeeper. Once Javier Aguirre left the national team, Ricardo La Volpe became coach, and Oswaldo Sánchez took over his spot.

Guillermo Ochoa was expected to be the starting keeper for Mexico at the 2010 World Cup but in a surprise move, Pérez was called up and played as the starting goalkeeper in the tournament. Following Mexico's loss in the Round of 16 to Argentina, Pérez announced his retirement from the national team on 14 July 2010.

== Personal life ==
In October 2017, Pérez helped found Asociación Mexicana de Futbolistas (Mexican Footballers Association).

== Career statistics ==
Club	Div.	Season	League		Cup (Note: Includes data from Copa Mexico (1994–1997, 2012–2019), Pre Pre Libertadores (1998–2002), and InterLiga (2006–2010))		Continental (Note: Includes data from Pre-Libertadores tournament (2001, 2003), Copa Libertadores (2001, 2003), Concacaf Champions League (1996, 1997, 1998, 2014-15, 2016–17) and FIFA Club World Cup (2017))		Total	
Club	Div.	Season	Apps	Goals	Apps	Goals	Apps	Goals	Apps	Goals
Cruz Azul	Primera División de México									
Cruz Azul	Primera División de México	1993–94	7	0	-	-	-	-	7	0
Cruz Azul	Primera División de México	1994–95	20	0	2	0	-	-	22	0
Cruz Azul	Primera División de México	1995–96	4	0	1	0	-	-	5	0
Cruz Azul	Primera División de México	1996–97	9	0	-	-	0	0	9	0
Cruz Azul	Primera División de México	1997–98	31	0	-	-	4	0	35	0
Cruz Azul	Primera División de México	1998–99	32	0	3	0	1	0	36	0
Cruz Azul	Primera División de México	1999–2000	39	0	3	0	-	-	43	0
Cruz Azul	Primera División de México	2000–01	32	0	3	0	18	0	53	0
Cruz Azul	Primera División de México	2001–02	33	0	3	0	-	-	36	0
Cruz Azul	Primera División de México	2002–03	39	0	2	0	11	0	52	0
Cruz Azul	Primera División de México	2003–04	46	0	-	-	-	-	46	0
Cruz Azul	Primera División de México	2004–05	28	0	-	-	-	-	27	0
Cruz Azul	Primera División de México	2005–06	28	0	3	0	-	-	30	0
Cruz Azul	Primera División de México	2006–07	39	1	1	0	-	-	40	1
Cruz Azul	Primera División de México	2007–08	31	0	3	0	-	-	34	0
Cruz Azul	Primera División de México	Total	418	1	24	0	34	0	476	1
Tigres UANL	Primera División de México									
Tigres UANL	Primera División de México	2008–09	30	0	2	0	-	-	32	0
Tigres UANL	Primera División de México	Total	30	0	2	0	-	-	32	0
Chiapas	Primera División de México									
Chiapas	Primera División de México	2009–10	30	0	2	0	-	-	32	0
Chiapas	Primera División de México	Total	30	0	2	0	-	-	32	0
Necaxa	Primera División de México									
Necaxa	Primera División de México	2010–11	34	0	-	-	-	-	34	0
Necaxa	Primera División de México	Total	34	0	-	-	-	-	34	0
San Luis	Primera División de México									
San Luis	Primera División de México	2011–12	31	0	-	-	-	-	31	0
San Luis	Primera División de México	2012–13	31	0	2	0	-	-	33	0
San Luis	Primera División de México	Total	62	0	2	0	-	-	64	0
Pachuca	Liga MX									
Pachuca	Liga MX	2013–14	39	0	1	0	-	-	40	0
Pachuca	Liga MX	2014–15	30	0	0	0	4	0	34	0
Pachuca	Liga MX	2015–16	37	0	0	0	-	-	37	0
Pachuca	Liga MX	2016–17	36	1	1	0	4	0	39	1
Pachuca	Liga MX	2017–18	12	0	2	0	2	0	16	0
Pachuca	Liga MX	2018–19	2	0	1	0	0	0	3	0
Pachuca	Liga MX	Total	166	1	4	0	10	0	177	1
Cruz Azul	Liga MX									
Cruz Azul	Liga MX	2019–20	1	0	-	-	-	-	1	0
Cruz Azul	Liga MX	Total	1	0	-	-	-	-	1	0
Total career			741	2	35	0	44	0	820	2

=== International ===
Mexico
Year	Apps	Goals
1997	1	0
1998	6	0
1999	4	0
2000	6	0
2001	13	0
2002	10	0
2003	1	0
2004	1	0
2005	4	0
2009	2	0
2010	7	0
Total	55	0

== Honours ==
Cruz Azul

- Primera División: Invierno 1997
- Copa México: 1996–97
- Supercopa MX: 2019
- Copa Pachuca: 1997, 1998, 2002, 2006
- CONCACAF Champions' Cup: 1996, 1997
- Leagues Cup: 2019
- Selectivo Pre Pre Libertadores: 2000, 2002
- Copa Pre Libertadores: 2000, 2002
- Copa Libertadores runner-up: 2001

San Luis

- Copa Tijuana: 2011

Pachuca

- Liga MX: Clausura 2016
- CONCACAF Champions League: 2016–17
- Copa Pachuca: 2013, 2014
- FIFA Club World Cup third place: 2017

Mexico

- FIFA Confederations Cup: 1999
- Copa América runner-up: 2001; third place: 1999
- CONCACAF Gold Cup: 1998, 2003, 2009
- Pan American Games Silver Medal: 1995
- CONCACAF Pre-Olympic Tournament: 1996

Individual

- IFFHS World's 11th Best Goalkeeper: 2001
- Liga MX Fair Play Award: Apertura 2008
- Liga MX Final Best Player: Clausura 2016
- Liga MX Best XI: Clausura 2016
- AS México Torneo Clausura Best XI: 2016
- Cruz Azul Farewell Ceremony: 2019
- Medal of Sporting Merit: 2021
- FIFA International Football Hall of Fame: 2023
- Pachuca Leyendas: 2025

Records

- Oldest player in history to play at the FIFA Club World Cup
- Most Liga MX appearances: 746
- Oldest player ever in the Liga MX
- Oldest player to win a Liga MX title
- Oldest player to make a Liga MX Best XI
- Most appearances for Cruz Azul as a goalkeeper
