= 2009 Copa Pachuca =

Tournament details
- Teams: 4

Tournament statistics
- Matches played: 2
- Goals scored: 6 (3 per match)

XIV Cuadrangular Cuna de Futbol Mexicano Banorte or simply known as Copa Pachuca is the 14th edition of the Copa Pachuca.

== Teams Participating ==
Team	GP	W	D	L	GF	GA
(Mexico) C.F. Pachuca	2	1	1	0	5	4
(Mexico) Atlante F.C.	2	1	1	0	3	2
(Mexico) Querétaro F.C.	1	0	0	1	2	3
(Mexico) Monarcas Morelia	1	0	0	1	0	1

== Bracket ==
Semi-finals
16 July 2009, Estadio Hidalgo
(Mexico) C.F. Pachuca	3
(Mexico) Querétaro F.C.	2
16 July 2009, Estadio Hidalgo
(Mexico) Atlante F.C.	1
(Mexico) Monarcas Morelia	0

Final
18 July 2009, Estadio Hidalgo
(Mexico) C.F. Pachuca	2 (5)
(Mexico) Atlante F.C.	2 (4)

== Matches ==
=== Semifinal 1 ===
2009-07-16
17:00

C.F. Pachuca	3 – 2	Querétaro F.C.
Damián Manso 21', 44'; Juan Carlos Cacho 41'		Isaac Romo 69', 92'

Estadio Hidalgo
Referee: Miguel Ángel Ayala (Mexico)

=== Semifinal 2 ===
2009-07-16
19:00

Atlante F.C.	1 – 0	Monarcas Morelia
Rafael Márquez Lugo 67'

Estadio Hidalgo
Referee: Miguel Ángel Ayala (Mexico)

== Final ==
2009-07-18
19:00

C.F. Pachuca	2 - 2	Atlante F.C.
Christian Gimenez 26', Ulises Mendivil 68'		Luis David Velázquez 24', Rafael Márquez Lugo 72'
Penalties
Gimenez (penalty scored); Muñoz (penalty scored); Caballero (penalty scored); Rodríguez (penalty scored); Alvarez (penalty missed); Mendivil (penalty scored)	5 – 4	Márquez Lugo (penalty scored); Morales (penalty scored); Maldonado (penalty missed); Vilar (penalty scored); Pereyra (penalty scored); Arreola (penalty missed)

Estadio Hidalgo
Referee: Ricardo Arellano (Mexico)
