= 2013–14 Puebla F.C. season =

Puebla
2013–14 season
- Chairman: Jesus Lopez Charagoy
- Manager: Manuel Lapuente (December 4, 2012 – August 13, 2013); Ruben Omar Romano (from August 14, 2013)
- Stadium: Estadio Cuauhtémoc
- Apertura 2013: 13th
- Copa MX (Apertura): Group stage
- Top goalscorer: Apertura: Matías Alustiza (6); Clausura:
Home colours	Away colours	Third colours

The 2013–14 Puebla season was the 67th professional season of Mexico's top-flight football league. The season is split into two tournaments—the Torneo Apertura and the Torneo Clausura—each with identical formats and each contested by the same eighteen teams. Puebla began their season on July 21, 2013, against Pumas UNAM, Puebla play their homes games on Sundays at 12:00pm local time.

== Torneo Apertura ==
List of Mexican football transfers summer 2013

Note: Flags indicate national team as defined under FIFA eligibility rules; some limited exceptions apply. Players may hold more than one non-FIFA nationality.

No.	Pos.	Nation	Player
1	GK	MEX	Armando Navarrete (on loan from América)
2	DF	URU	Jonathan Lacerda (on loan from Santos)
3	DF	MEX	Jaime Durán (on loan from Morelia)
4	DF	MEX	Jesús Chávez (captain)
5	MF	MEX	Leandro Augusto (on loan from Tijuana)
6	MF	MEX	Diego De Buen (on loan from UNAM)
7	MF	MEX	Luis Noriega
8	MF	MEX	Alberto Medina
9	FW	ECU	Félix Borja
10	FW	ARG	Alfredo Moreno (on loan from Chiapas)
11	MF	USA	DaMarcus Beasley
12	DF	MEX	Óscar Rojas
15	DF	MEX	Edgar Muñoz
16	DF	USA	Michael Orozco
17	MF	URU	Carlos Sánchez

No.	Pos.	Nation	Player
18	FW	MEX	Brayan Martínez (on loan from Monterrey)
19	DF	MEX	Rodrigo Íñigo (on loan from América)
20	DF	MEX	René Ruvalcaba (on loan from UANL)
21	MF	MEX	Cesáreo Victorino
22	FW	ARG	Matías Alustiza
23	GK	MEX	Jorge Villalpando
24	MF	MEX	Eduardo Arce
25	MF	MEX	Pablo González
27	MF	MEX	Juan Vega
28	MF	MEX	Diego Vera
29	MF	MEX	Hiber Ruíz
30	FW	MEX	Pablo Bonells (on loan from UNAM)
31	DF	MEX	Abraham Ruíz
32	MF	MEX	Patricio Sánchez
33	GK	MEX	Guillermo Iriarte

=== Regular season ===
Win Draw Loss

==== Apertura 2013 results ====
July 21, 2013 Round 1	Puebla	1–1	UNAM	Puebla, Puebla
12:30	Pablo González (yellow card) 8'; René Ruvalcaba (yellow card) 43'; Alustiza 88'	Report	Bravo 29'; Espinosa (yellow card) 56'	Stadium: Estadio Cuauhtémoc; Referee: Víctor Bisguerra Mendiola

July 27, 2013 Round 2	Monterrey	1–1	Puebla	Nuevo Leon, Monterrey
12:00	Basanta (yellow card) 62'; Pabón (yellow card) 84' (goal) 90+4'	Report	Noriega (yellow card) 25'; Moreno (yellow card) 66'; Alustiza 78'; Villalpando (yellow card) 81'; Borja (red card) 90+3'	Stadium: Estadio Cuauhtémoc; Referee: Luis Enrique Santander

July 31, 2013 Round 3	Puebla	1–1	Santos Laguna	Puebla, Puebla
19:00	Chávez (yellow card) 37'; Noriega (yellow card) 42' (goal) 90+2'	Report	Rentería 34'; Araujo (yellow card) 49'; Herrera (yellow card) 58'; Calderón (yellow card) 90+1'	Stadium: Estadio Cuauhtémoc; Referee: Fernando Guerrero Ramírez

August 3, 2013 Round 4	Chiapas	4–2	Puebla	Tuxtla Gutiérrez, Chiapas
12:00		Report		Stadium: Estadio Victor Manuel Reyna; Referee: Erim Ramírez Ulloa

August 11, 2013 Round 5	Puebla	0–0	Veracruz	Puebla, Puebla
21:30				Stadium: Estadio Cuauhtémoc; Referee: José Alfredo Peñaloza Soto

August 18, 2013 Round 6	Guadalajara	2–4	Puebla	Zapopan, Jalisco
12:00				Stadium: Estadio Omnilife; Referee: Ricardo Arellano Nieves

August 23, 2013 Round 7	Puebla	1–2	Cruz Azul	Puebla, Puebla
12:00				Stadium: Estadio Cuauhtémoc; Referee: Miguel Ángel Chacón

September 1, 2013 Round 8	Puebla	1–0	Atlante	Puebla, Puebla
12:00				Stadium: Estadio Cuauhtémoc

September 6, 2013 Round 9	Querétaro	1–0	Puebla	Querétaro, Querétaro
19:30				Stadium: Estadio Corregidora

September 15, 2013 Round 10	Puebla	1–1	Toluca	Puebla, Puebla
19:00		Report		Stadium: Estadio Cuauhtémoc

September 21, 2013 Round 11	Tigres UANL	0–0	Puebla	San Nicolás de los Garza, Nuevo León
19:00		Report		Stadium: Estadio Universitario

September 29, 2013 Round 12	Puebla	2–0	Club Tijuana	Puebla, Puebla
19:00				Stadium: Estadio Cuauhtémoc

October 5, 2013 Round 13	Club Leon	3–1	Puebla	Guanajuato, Leon
21:00				Stadium: Cam Nou

October 20, 2013 Round 14	Puebla	2–0	Club Atlas	Puebla, Puebla
19:30				Stadium: Estadio Cuauhtémoc

October 26, 2013 Round 15	Club America	3–1	Puebla	Mexico, DF
17:00		Report		Stadium: Estadio Azteca

November 3, 2013 Round 16	Puebla	1–1	Pachuca	Puebla, Puebla
12:00				Stadium: Estadio Cuauhtémoc

November 8, 2013 Round 17	Morelia	1–0	Puebla	Michoacán, Morelia
12:00		Report		Stadium: [Estadio Morelos]

=== Goalscorers ===
Position	Nation	Name	Goals scored
1.	(Argentina)	Matías Alustiza	6
2.	(Argentina)	Alfredo Moreno	3
3.	(Mexico)	Luis Miguel Noriega	2
3.	(Uruguay)	Carlos Andrés Sánchez	2
4.	(Mexico)	Jesús Roberto Chávez	1
4.	(Mexico)	Diego De Buen	1
4.	(United States)	Michael Orozco Fiscal	1

=== Results ===
==== Results summary ====
Overall								Home						Away					
Pld	W	D	L	GF	GA	GD	Pts	W	D	L	GF	GA	GD	W	D	L	GF	GA	GD
18	4	7	7	19	20	−1	19	3	5	2	10	5	+5	1	2	5	9	15	−6

Last updated: 9 November 2013.
Source: Apertura 2013 results

==== Results by round ====
Round	1	2	3	4	5	6	7	8	9	10	11	12	13	14	15	16	17
Ground	H	A	H	A	H	A	H	H	A	H	A	H	A	H	A	H	A
Result	D	D	D	L	D	W	L	W	L	D	D	W	L	W	L	D	L
Position	9	10	11	15	13	10	12	10	10	9	9	9	11	9	11	13	13

Updated to match(es) played on 9 November 2013. Source: Apertura 2013 results and mediotiempo.com
A = Away; H = Home; W = Win; D = Draw; L = Loss

== Apertura 2013 Copa MX ==
=== Group stage ===
Win Draw Loss

==== Apertura results ====
July 23, 2013 1	Puebla	2–2	Altamira	Puebla, Puebla
19:00				Stadium: Estadio Cuauhtémoc

August 7, 2013 2	Altamira	2–0	Puebla	Altamira, Tamaulipas
21:00		Report		Stadium: Estadio Altamira

August 20, 2013 3	Puebla	2–3	Correcaminos	Puebla, Puebla
19:00				Stadium: Estadio Cuauhtémoc

August 27, 2013 4	Correcaminos	1–1	Puebla	Ciudad Victoria, Tamaulipas
21:00				Stadium: Estadio Marte R. Gómez

September 17, 2013 5	Puebla	0–1	Monterrey	Puebla, Puebla
21:00	Íñigo (yellow card) 44' (yellow-red card)	Summary	Madrigal 48' (yellow card) 55'	Stadium: Estadio Cuauhtémoc; Referee: (Mexico) Victor Bisguerra

September 24, 2013 6	Monterrey	1–1	Puebla	Monterrey, Nuevo Leon
21:00	Bernardo Hernández 43'	Summary	René Ruvalcaba 35'	Stadium: Estadio Tecnológico; Referee: (Mexico) Roberto Ríos

=== Goalscorers ===
Position	Nation	Name	Goals scored
1.	(Mexico)	Brayan Martínez	1
1.	(Mexico)	Abraham Ruiz	1
TOTAL			7

=== Results ===
==== Results by round ====
Round	1	2	3	4	5	6
Ground	H	A	H	A	H	A
Result	D	L	L	D	L	D
Position	3	3	4	4	4	4

Updated to match(es) played on 25 September 2013. Source: Apertura results and mediotiempo.com
A = Away; H = Home; W = Win; D = Draw; L = Loss

== Torneo Clausura ==
=== Current squad ===
List of Mexican football transfers summer 2013

Note: Flags indicate national team as defined under FIFA eligibility rules; some limited exceptions apply. Players may hold more than one non-FIFA nationality.

No.	Pos.	Nation	Player
1	GK	MEX	Armando Navarrete (on loan from América)
3	DF	MEX	Jaime Durán (on loan from Morelia)
4	DF	MEX	Jesús Chávez
5	DF	MEX	Carlos Guzmán (on loan from Morelia)
6	MF	MEX	Édgar Mejía (on loan from Guadalajara)
7	MF	MEX	Luis Miguel Noriega (captain)
8	MF	MEX	Alan Zamora (on loan from Querétaro)
9	FW	MEX	Daniel Guzmán Jr.
10	MF	ARG	Iván Bella
11	MF	USA	DaMarcus Beasley
12	DF	MEX	Óscar Rojas (on loan from América)
13	MF	MEX	Mario Quezada
15	DF	MEX	Édgar Muñoz
16	DF	USA	Michael Orozco
17	MF	URU	Carlos Sánchez
18	MF	MEX	Brayan Martínez (on loan from Monterrey)
19	FW	MEX	Juan Carlos Cacho (on loan from UNAM)
20	DF	MEX	René Ruvalcaba (on loan from UANL)

No.	Pos.	Nation	Player
21	MF	MEX	Cesáreo Victorino
22	FW	ARG	Matías Alustiza
23	GK	MEX	Jorge Villalpando
24	MF	MEX	Eduardo Arce
25	MF	MEX	Pablo González
26	MF	MEX	Miguel Caloca
27	MF	MEX	Juan Manuel Vega
28	MF	MEX	Francisco Torres (on loan from Santos Laguna)
29	DF	MEX	Juan Carlos de la Barrera
30	FW	MEX	Pablo Bonells
31	DF	MEX	Abraham Ruíz
32	MF	MEX	Patricio Sánchez
33	MF	MEX	Alberto Medina (on loan from Pachuca)
34	FW	MEX	Julio Jiménez
35	MF	MEX	Saúl Villalobos (on loan from Atlas)
39	DF	MEX	Mario de Luna (on loan from Guadalajara)
57	DF	MEX	Uriel Álvarez (on loan from Santos Laguna)
67	MF	MEX	Alfonso Tamay (on loan from UANL)

=== Regular season ===
Win Draw Loss

==== Clausura 2014 results ====
January 5, 2014 Round 1	UNAM	2–2	Puebla	Coyoacán, Mexico City
12:30		Report		Stadium: Estadio Olímpico Universitario

January 12, 2014 Round 2	Puebla	1–1	Monterrey	Puebla, Puebla
12:00		Report		Stadium: Estadio Cuauhtémoc

January 17, 2014 Round 3	Santos Laguna	0–0	Puebla	Torreón, Coahuila
19:00		Report		Stadium: Estadio Corona; Referee: Fernando Guerrero Ramírez

January 25, 2014 Round 4	Puebla	2–3	Chiapas	Puebla, Puebla
				Stadium: Estadio Cuauhtémoc

February 1, 2014 Round 5	Veracruz	0–1	Puebla	Veracruz, Veracruz
21:30				Stadium: Estadio Luis Pirata Fuente

February 9, 2014 Round 6	Puebla	0–1	Guadalajara	Puebla, Puebla
				Stadium: Estadio Cuauhtémoc

February 15, 2014 Round 7	Cruz Azul	1–0	Puebla	Benito Juárez, Mexico City
				Stadium: Estadio Azul

February 23, 2014 Round 8	Atlante	0–0	Puebla	Cancún, Quintana Roo
				Stadium: Andrés Quintana Roo

March 2, 2014 Round 9	Puebla	1–0	Querétaro	Puebla, Puebla
				Stadium: Estadio Cuauhtémoc

March 9, 2014 Round 10	Toluca	3–0	Puebla	Toluca, Mexico, Mexico
				Stadium: Nemesio Díez

March 16, 2014 Round 11	Puebla	0–1	Tigres UANL	Puebla, Puebla
				Stadium: Estadio Cuauhtémoc

March 21, 2014 Round 12	Club Tijuana	3–0	Puebla	Tijuana, Baja California, Mexico
				Stadium: Estadio Caliente

March 30, 2014 Round 13	Puebla	1–1	Club Leon	Puebla, Puebla
				Stadium: Estadio Cuauhtémoc

April 5, 2014 Round 14	Club Atlas	0–0	Puebla	Guadalajara, Jalisco, Mexico
				Stadium: Jalisco

April 13, 2014 Round 15	Puebla	0–1	Club America	Puebla, Puebla
				Stadium: Estadio Cuauhtémoc

April 19, 2014 Round 16	Pachuca	1–2	Puebla	Pachuca, Hidalgo
				Stadium: Estadio Hidalgo

April 27, 2014 Round 17	Puebla	3–1	Morelia	Puebla, Puebla
				Stadium: Estadio Cuauhtémoc

=== Goalscorers ===
Position	Nation	Name	Goals scored
1.	(Argentina)	Matías Alustiza	2
2.	(Uruguay)	Carlos Sánchez	1
2.	(Mexico)	Saúl Villalobos	1
2.	(Mexico)	Alberto Medina	1
2.	(United States)	DaMarcus Beasley	1

=== Results ===
==== Results summary ====
Overall								Home						Away					
Pld	W	D	L	GF	GA	GD	Pts	W	D	L	GF	GA	GD	W	D	L	GF	GA	GD
17	4	6	7	14	19	−5	18	2	2	4	8	9	−1	2	4	3	6	10	−4

Last updated: 26 October 2013.
Source: Clausura 2014 results

==== Results by round ====
Round	1	2	3	4	5	6	7	8	9	10	11	12	13	14	15	16	17
Ground	A	H	A	H	A	H	A	H	A	H	A	H	H	A	H	A	H
Result	D	D	D	L	W	L	L	D	W	L	L	L	D	D	L	W	W
Position	4	9	13	15	10	12	14	16	11	14	16	16	16	16	16	16	16

Updated to match(es) played on 26 April 2014. Source: Clausura 2014 results and mediotiempo.com
A = Away; H = Home; W = Win; D = Draw; L = Loss

== Clausura 2014 Copa MX ==
=== Group stage ===
Win Draw Loss

==== Apertura results ====
January 14, 2014 1	Correcaminos UAT	4–1	Puebla	Ciudad Victoria, Tamaulipas
19:00				Stadium: Estadio Marte R. Gómez

January 21, 2014 2	Puebla	1–0	Correcaminos UAT	Puebla, Puebla
19:00				Stadium: Estadio Cuauhtémoc

February 6, 2014 3	Atlético San Luis	0–5	Puebla	San Luis, San Luis Potosí
19:00				Stadium: Estadio Alfonso Lastras

February 18, 2013 4	Puebla	0–0	Atlético San Luis	Puebla, Puebla
19:00				Stadium: Estadio Cuauhtémoc

Feabuary 27, 2013 5	Tigres UANL	8–0	Puebla	San Nicolás de los Garza, Nuevo Leon
21:00				Stadium: Estadio Universitario

March 13, 2013 6	Puebla	0–0	Tigres UANL	Puebla, Puebla
19:00				Stadium: Estadio Cuauhtémoc

=== Goalscorers ===
Position	Nation	Name	Goals scored
1.	(Mexico)	Alfonso Tamay	2
1.	(Mexico)	Brayan Martínez	2
2.	(Mexico)	Carlos Guzmán	1
2.	(Mexico)	Alfredo Juraidini	1
2.	(Argentina)	Iván Bella	1
TOTAL			7

=== Results ===
==== Results by round ====
Round	1	2	3	4	5	6
Ground	A	H	A	H	A	H
Result	L	W	W	D	L	
Position	4	3	2	2	2	

Updated to match(es) played on 21 January 2014. Source: Clausura results and mediotiempo.com
A = Away; H = Home; W = Win; D = Draw; L = Loss

== Copa Pachuca ==
Semi-finals
26 December – Estadio Hidalgo
Estudiantes UAG	3
Pumas UNAM	5
26 December – Estadio Hidalgo
Pachuca	0 (3)
Puebla	0 (4)

Final
28 December – Estadio Hidalgo
Pumas UNAM	1
Puebla	3
Third place
28 December – Estadio Hidalgo
Pachuca	0
Estudiantes UAG	3
