= Copa Pachuca 2014 =

Tournament details
- Teams: 4

Tournament statistics
- Matches played: 2
- Goals scored: 3 (1.5 per match)

XIX Cuadrangular Cuna de Futbol Mexicano or simply known as Copa Pachuca is the 19th edition of the Copa Pachuca.

== Teams Participating ==
| Team | GP | W | D | L | GF | GA |
|---|---|---|---|---|---|---|
| (Mexico) Club Universidad Nacional | 1 | 1 | 0 | 0 | 2 | 0 |
| (Mexico) C.F. Pachuca | 1 | 1 | 0 | 0 | 1 | 0 |
| (Mexico) Deportivo Toluca F.C. | 1 | 0 | 0 | 1 | 0 | 2 |
| (Costa Rica) Santos de Guápiles | 1 | 0 | 0 | 1 | 0 | 1 |

== Matches ==
=== Semifinal 1 ===
2014-07-10
17:00

| Club Universidad Nacional | 2 – 0 | Deportivo Toluca F.C. |
|---|---|---|
| Ismael Sosa 13'; Dante López 74' |

Estadio Hidalgo
Referee: Miguel Ángel Ayala (Mexico)

=== Semifinal 2 ===
2014-07-10
19:00

| C.F. Pachuca | 1 – 0 | Santos de Guápiles |
|---|---|---|
| Hugo Isaác Rodríguez 68' |

Estadio Hidalgo
Referee: Miguel Ángel Ayala (Mexico)

== Final ==
2014-07-12
21:00

| Club Universidad Nacional | - | C.F. Pachuca |

Estadio Hidalgo
