= List of Mexican football transfers summer 2013 =

This is a list of Mexican football transfers in the Mexican Primera Division during the summer 2013 transfer window, grouped by club. It only includes football clubs from Liga MX, the first division of Mexican football.

== Mexican Primera Division ==
=== América ===
In: Note: Flags indicate national team as defined under FIFA eligibility rules; some limited exceptions apply. Players may hold more than one non-FIFA nationality.

No.	Pos.	Nation	Player
—	FW	MEX	Erick Pimentel (loan return from Atlante)
—	MF	COL	Andrés Felipe Andrade (from (Colombia) Deportes Tolima)
—	FW	COL	Luis Gabriel Rey (from Querétaro)
—	FW	MEX	Luis Ángel Mendoza (from Chiapas)
—	MF	MEX	Carlos Alberto Gutiérrez (from Atlas)

Out: Note: Flags indicate national team as defined under FIFA eligibility rules; some limited exceptions apply. Players may hold more than one non-FIFA nationality.

No.	Pos.	Nation	Player
4	DF	MEX	Efraín Juárez (on loan to Monterrey)
11	FW	ECU	Christian Benítez (to (Qatar) El Jaish)
13	DF	MEX	Diego Reyes (to (Portugal) Porto)
25	MF	MEX	Jorge Urias (on loan to Zacatepec)
28	FW	MEX	Martín Zúñiga (on loan to Chiapas)
30	DF	MEX	Irving García (on loan to Zacatepec)

=== Atlante ===
In: Note: Flags indicate national team as defined under FIFA eligibility rules; some limited exceptions apply. Players may hold more than one non-FIFA nationality.

No.	Pos.	Nation	Player
—	GK	MEX	Yosgart Gutiérrez (on loan from Cruz Azul)
—	DF	MEX	Héctor Morales (on loan from Monterrey)
—	DF	MEX	Alex Diego (loan return from Lobos BUAP)
—	DF	MEX	Jorge Hernández (loan return from Tijuana)
—	MF	ARG	Martín Galmarini (from (Argentina) Tigre)
—	MF	MEX	Alejandro Vela (on loan from Cruz Azul)
—	DF	MEX	Ricardo Jiménez (loan return from Chiapas)
—	FW	MEX	Ángel Sepúlveda (from Toros Neza)
—	MF	MEX	Francisco Acuña (on loan from UANL, previously on loan at Chiapas)
—	MF	MEX	Guillermo Rojas (on loan from Querétaro, previously on loan Chiapas)
—	FW	MEX	Ezequiel Orozco (on loan from Necaxa)
—	DF	MEX	Sergio Pérez (from Guadalajara)
—	GK	MEX	Éder Patiño (loan return from Correcaminos)
—	DF	ARG	Mauricio Romero (from (Argentina) Club Atlético Colón)
—	MF	MEX	Kevin Zapata (from Puebla, previously on loan at Mérida)
—	MF	ARG	Walter Erviti (from (Argentina) Boca Juniors)
—	FW	ARG	Ezequiel Miralles (from (Brazil) Santos)
—	FW	ARG	Roberto Nanni (from (Paraguay) Cerro Porteño)

Out: Note: Flags indicate national team as defined under FIFA eligibility rules; some limited exceptions apply. Players may hold more than one non-FIFA nationality.

No.	Pos.	Nation	Player
1	DF	URU	Joe Bizera (to (Uruguay) Club Atlético Peñarol)
3	MF	MEX	Óscar Ricardo Rojas (loan return to UNAM)
7	FW	CHI	Esteban Paredes (to Querétaro)
11	FW	MEX	Jerónimo Amione (to Cruz Azul)
18	MF	MEX	Israel Martínez (on loan to Veracruz)
20	MF	MEX	Sergio Nápoles (on loan to Cruz Azul)
23	GK	MEX	Jorge Villalpando (to Puebla)

=== Atlas ===
In: Note: Flags indicate national team as defined under FIFA eligibility rules; some limited exceptions apply. Players may hold more than one non-FIFA nationality.

No.	Pos.	Nation	Player
—	FW	MEX	Flavio Santos (loan return from Toluca)

Out: Note: Flags indicate national team as defined under FIFA eligibility rules; some limited exceptions apply. Players may hold more than one non-FIFA nationality.

No.	Pos.	Nation	Player
12	GK	MEX	Alejandro Gallardo (on loan to Atletico San Luis)
17	DF	MEX	Luis Enrique Robles (on loan to Chiapas)
24	GK	MEX	Alfredo Sánchez (on loan to Atletico San Luis)
26	MF	MEX	Carlos Alberto Gutiérrez (to América)
27	MF	MEX	Isaac Brizuela (loan return to Toluca)
28	MF	MEX	Luis Alonso Sandoval (loan return to Necaxa)
—	GK	MEX	José Francisco Canales (on loan to BUAP, previously on loan at U de G)
—	FW	MEX	Mauricio Romero (to Chiapas, previously on loan at Sinaloa)

=== Chiapas ===
^{[a]}

In: Note: Flags indicate national team as defined under FIFA eligibility rules; some limited exceptions apply. Players may hold more than one non-FIFA nationality.

No.	Pos.	Nation	Player
—	GK	MEX	Alfredo Frausto (from Sinaloa)
—	DF	MEX	Uriel Álvarez (on loan from Santos Laguna, previously on loan at Morelia)
—	DF	ARG	Miguel Ángel Martínez (on loan from Querétaro)
—	DF	MEX	Luis Enrique Robles (on loan from Atlas)
—	MF	MEX	César de la Peña (on loan from Monterrey)
—	MF	MEX	David Toledo (on loan from Querétaro)
—	MF	MEX	Francisco Torres (on loan from Santos Laguna, previously on loan at Morelia)
—	DF	MEX	Roberto Juárez (on loan from Puebla)
—	FW	COL	Áviles Hurtado (on loan from Pachuca)
—	MF	PAR	David Mendieta (on loan from (Paraguay) San Lorenzo)
—	FW	MEX	Carlos Ochoa (on loan from Santos Laguna, previously on loan at Morelia)
—	FW	MEX	Mauricio Romero (from Atlas, previously on loan at Sinaloa)
—	FW	MEX	Sergio Santana (from Morelia)
—	FW	MEX	Martín Zúñiga (on loan from América)
—	FW	ARG	Lucas Viatri (on loan from (Argentina) Boca Juniors)
—	FW	ARG	Iván Bella (on loan from (Argentina) Vélez Sársfield)

Out: Note: Flags indicate national team as defined under FIFA eligibility rules; some limited exceptions apply. Players may hold more than one non-FIFA nationality.

No.	Pos.	Nation	Player
1	GK	MEX	Óscar Pérez (to Pachuca)
6	DF	MEX	Omar Esparza (loan return to Guadalajara)
8	MF	MEX	Alan Zamora (to Atlante)
9	FW	COL	Santiago Trellez (on loan to Morelia)
12	GK	MEX	César Lozano (on loan to Toluca)
13	MF	MEX	Francisco Acuña (loan return to UANL)
17	MF	MEX	Guillermo Rojas (loan return to Querétaro)
19	MF	MEX	Emilio López (loan return to Querétaro)
20	MF	MEX	Isaí Arredondo (on loan to BUAP)
23	DF	MEX	Yasser Corona (on loan to Querétaro)
26	FW	MEX	Luis Ángel Mendoza (to América)
—	DF	MEX	Oscar Mascorro (to Veracruz, previously on loan at León)
—	DF	USA	Michael Orozco (to Puebla, previously on loan)
—	MF	MEX	Ignacio Torres (on loan to Puebla, previously on loan at Mérida)
—	FW	ARG	Alfredo Moreno (on loan to Puebla, previously on loan at Tijuana)
—	FW	COL	Jhon Córdoba (on loan to (Spain) RCD Espanyol)

=== Cruz Azul ===
In: Note: Flags indicate national team as defined under FIFA eligibility rules; some limited exceptions apply. Players may hold more than one non-FIFA nationality.

No.	Pos.	Nation	Player
—	MF	MEX	Sergio Nápoles (on loan from Atlante)
—	MF	CMR	Achille Emana (from (United Arab Emirates) Al Ahli Club, previously on loan at (United Arab Emirates) Al Wasl FC)
—	MF	ARG	Mauro Formica (from (England) Blackburn Rovers, previously on loan at (Italy) Palermo)
—	FW	MEX	Jerónimo Amione (from Atlante)

Out: Note: Flags indicate national team as defined under FIFA eligibility rules; some limited exceptions apply. Players may hold more than one non-FIFA nationality.

No.	Pos.	Nation	Player
3	DF	MEX	Nestor Araujo (on loan to Santos Laguna)
11	MF	MEX	Alejandro Vela (on loan to Atlante)
23	MF	ARG	Nicolás Bertolo (to (Argentina) Banfield)
25	GK	MEX	Yosgart Gutiérrez (on loan to Atlante)
27	FW	MEX	Javier Orozco (to Santos Laguna)
29	FW	COL	Teófilo Gutiérrez (to (Argentina) River Plate)

=== Guadalajara ===
In: Note: Flags indicate national team as defined under FIFA eligibility rules; some limited exceptions apply. Players may hold more than one non-FIFA nationality.

No.	Pos.	Nation	Player
—	DF	MEX	Omar Esparza (loan return from Chiapas)
—	DF	MEX	Néstor Vidrio (from Pachuca)
—	MF	MEX	Antonio Gallardo (loan return from Querétaro)
—	MF	MEX	Edgar Solis (loan return from Monterrey)
—	FW	MEX	Aldo de Nigris (from Monterrey)

Out: Note: Flags indicate national team as defined under FIFA eligibility rules; some limited exceptions apply. Players may hold more than one non-FIFA nationality.

No.	Pos.	Nation	Player
6	DF	MEX	Adrián Cortés (on loan to Veracruz)
23	MF	MEX	Luis Ernesto Pérez (on loan to Querétaro)
24	DF	MEX	Sergio Pérez (to Atlante)
163	MF	MEX	Luis Ángel Morales (to Pachuca)
—	GK	MEX	Sergio García (to UANL, previously on loan at Querétaro)
—	DF	MEX	Dionicio Escalante (to Querétaro, previously on loan)
—	MF	MEX	Mario Nieblas (to Querétaro)
—	MF	MEX	Mitchel Oviedo (to Querétaro, previously on loan)
—	FW	MEX	Michel Vazquez (to Querétaro)

=== León ===
In: Note: Flags indicate national team as defined under FIFA eligibility rules; some limited exceptions apply. Players may hold more than one non-FIFA nationality.

No.	Pos.	Nation	Player
—	GK	MEX	William Yarbrough (from Pachuca, previously on loan)
—	DF	MEX	Fernando Navarro (on loan from UANL, previously on loan at Pachuca)
—	MF	MEX	Elías Hernández (on loan from UANL)
—	FW	COL	Franco Arizala (from Querétaro)
—	FW	ARG	Mauro Boselli (from (England) Wigan Athletic, previously on loan at (Italy) Palermo)

Out: Note: Flags indicate national team as defined under FIFA eligibility rules; some limited exceptions apply. Players may hold more than one non-FIFA nationality.

No.	Pos.	Nation	Player
3	DF	MEX	Oscar Mascorro (loan return to Chiapas)
14	FW	COL	Yovanny Arrechea (to (Colombia) Independiente de Santa Fe)
30	GK	MEX	Édgar Hernández (loan return to Pachuca)

=== Monterrey ===
In: Note: Flags indicate national team as defined under FIFA eligibility rules; some limited exceptions apply. Players may hold more than one non-FIFA nationality.

No.	Pos.	Nation	Player
—	DF	MEX	Efraín Juárez (on loan from América)
—	MF	BRA	Lucas Silva (from Toluca)
—	FW	COL	Dorlan Pabón (from (Italy) Parma, previously on loan at (Spain) Real Betis)
—	FW	ECU	Marlon de Jesús (from (Ecuador) Emelec)

Out: Note: Flags indicate national team as defined under FIFA eligibility rules; some limited exceptions apply. Players may hold more than one non-FIFA nationality.

No.	Pos.	Nation	Player
6	DF	MEX	Héctor Morales (on loan to Atlante)
7	MF	MEX	Edgar Solís (loan return to Guadalajara)
8	FW	COL	Dorlan Pabón (to (Spain) Valencia)
9	FW	MEX	Aldo de Nigris (to Guadalajara)
11	MF	ECU	Walter Ayoví (to Pachuca)
14	MF	MEX	Jesús Corona (to (Netherlands) F.C. Twente)
16	MF	MEX	César de la Peña (on loan to Chiapas)

=== Morelia ===
In: Note: Flags indicate national team as defined under FIFA eligibility rules; some limited exceptions apply. Players may hold more than one non-FIFA nationality.

No.	Pos.	Nation	Player
—	MF	MEX	Edgar Andrade (from Querétaro)
—	MF	MEX	Armando Zamorano (from Querétaro)
—	MF	MEX	Jorge Zárate (from Puebla, previously on loan at Querétaro)
—	FW	MEX	Ever Guzmán (loan return from Toros Neza)
—	FW	COL	Santiago Trellez (on loan from Chiapas)
—	MF	ECU	Juan Govea (on loan from (Ecuador) El Nacional)

Santiago Tréllez Vivero Out: Note: Flags indicate national team as defined under FIFA eligibility rules; some limited exceptions apply. Players may hold more than one non-FIFA nationality.

No.	Pos.	Nation	Player
4	DF	MEX	Uriel Álvarez (loan return to Santos Laguna)
11	FW	MEX	Carlos Ochoa (loan return to Santos Laguna)
21	FW	MEX	Sergio Santana (to Chiapas)
22	MF	MEX	Francisco Torres (loan return to Santos Laguna)

=== Pachuca ===
In: Note: Flags indicate national team as defined under FIFA eligibility rules; some limited exceptions apply. Players may hold more than one non-FIFA nationality.

No.	Pos.	Nation	Player
—	GK	MEX	Óscar Pérez (from Chiapas)
—	DF	MEX	Jorge Iván Estrada (from Santos Laguna)
—	MF	ECU	Walter Ayoví (from Monterrey)
—	MF	MEX	Luis Ángel Morales (from Guadalajara)
—	FW	COL	Duvier Riascos (from Tijuana)

Out: Note: Flags indicate national team as defined under FIFA eligibility rules; some limited exceptions apply. Players may hold more than one non-FIFA nationality.

No.	Pos.	Nation	Player
3	DF	MEX	Néstor Vidrio (to Guadalajara)
4	DF	PAR	Paulo Da Silva (to Toluca)
14	DF	MEX	Fernando Navarro (loan return to Tigres de la UANL)
18	FW	COL	Áviles Hurtado (on loan to Chiapas)
—	GK	MEX	Édgar Hernández (to Veracruz, previously on loan at Léon)
—	GK	MEX	William Yarbrough (to León, previously on loan)
—	MF	MEX	Héctor Herrera (to (Portugal) Porto)

=== Puebla ===
In: Note: Flags indicate national team as defined under FIFA eligibility rules; some limited exceptions apply. Players may hold more than one non-FIFA nationality.

No.	Pos.	Nation	Player
—	GK	MEX	Armando Navarrete (on loan from Necaxa, previously on loan at América)
—	MF	MEX	Leandro Augusto (on loan from Tijuana)
—	MF	MEX	Diego De Buen (from UNAM, previously on loan)
—	FW	ARG	Alfredo Moreno (on loan from Chiapas, previously on loan at Tijuana)
—	DF	MEX	Óscar Rojas (from Pachuca, previously on loan at América)
—	DF	USA	Michael Orozco (from Chiapas, previously on loan)
—	DF	MEX	Rodrigo Íñigo (on loan from Lobos BUAP, previously on loan at América)
—	GK	MEX	Jorge Villalpando (from Atlante)
—	MF	URU	Carlos Sánchez (from (Argentina) River Plate)

Out: Note: Flags indicate national team as defined under FIFA eligibility rules; some limited exceptions apply. Players may hold more than one non-FIFA nationality.

No.	Pos.	Nation	Player
23	GK	MEX	Víctor Hugo Hernández (loan return to Guadalajara)
26	DF	MEX	Roberto Juárez (on loan to Chiapas)
—	DF	MEX	Aldo Polo (on loan to Tijuana)
—	MF	MEX	Jorge Zárate (to Morelia, previously on loan at Querétaro)

=== Querétaro ===
^{[b]}

In: Note: Flags indicate national team as defined under FIFA eligibility rules; some limited exceptions apply. Players may hold more than one non-FIFA nationality.

No.	Pos.	Nation	Player
—	DF	MEX	Yasser Corona (on loan from Chiapas)
—	DF	MEX	Dionicio Escalante (from Guadalajara, previously on loan)
—	MF	MEX	Mario Nieblas (from Guadalajara)
—	MF	MEX	Mitchel Oviedo (from Guadalajara, previously on loan)
—	MF	MEX	Luis Ernesto Pérez (on loan from Guadalajara)
—	FW	CHI	Esteban Paredes (from Atlante)
—	FW	MEX	Michel Vázquez (from Guadalajara)

Out: Note: Flags indicate national team as defined under FIFA eligibility rules; some limited exceptions apply. Players may hold more than one non-FIFA nationality.

No.	Pos.	Nation	Player
2	DF	ARG	Miguel Ángel Martínez (on loan to Chiapas)
3	DF	COL	Leiton Jiménez (to Veracruz)
7	MF	MEX	David Toledo (on loan to Chiapas)
11	FW	COL	Luis Gabriel Rey (to América)
17	MF	MEX	Armando Zamorano (to Morelia)
18	GK	MEX	Sergio García (to Tigres)
19	MF	MEX	Edgar Andrade (to Morelia)
20	FW	COL	Franco Arizala (to León)
25	MF	MEX	Antonio Gallardo (loan return to Guadalajara)
26	MF	MEX	Jorge Zárate (loan return to Puebla)
—	MF	MEX	Emilio López (on loan to UANL, previously on loan at Chiapas)
—	MF	MEX	Guillermo Rojas (on loan to Atlante, previously on loan Chiapas)

=== Santos Laguna ===
In: Note: Flags indicate national team as defined under FIFA eligibility rules; some limited exceptions apply. Players may hold more than one non-FIFA nationality.

No.	Pos.	Nation	Player
—	DF	MEX	Nestor Araujo (on loan from Cruz Azul)
—	FW	MEX	Eduardo Herrera (on loan from UNAM)
—	FW	MEX	Javier Orozco (from Cruz Azul)

Out: Note: Flags indicate national team as defined under FIFA eligibility rules; some limited exceptions apply. Players may hold more than one non-FIFA nationality.

No.	Pos.	Nation	Player
4	DF	MEX	Jorge Iván Estrada (to Pachuca)
5	DF	MEX	Aaron Galindo (on loan to Toluca)
7	MF	MEX	Édgar Lugo (to UANL)
16	FW	USA	Herculez Gomez (to Tijuana)
37	FW	MEX	Cándido Ramírez (on loan to UNAM)
—	DF	MEX	Uriel Álvarez (on loan to Chiapas, previously on loan at Morelia)
—	MF	MEX	Francisco Torres (on loan to Chiapas, previously on loan at Morelia)
—	FW	MEX	Carlos Ochoa (on loan to Chiapas, previously on loan at Morelia)

=== Tijuana ===
In: Note: Flags indicate national team as defined under FIFA eligibility rules; some limited exceptions apply. Players may hold more than one non-FIFA nationality.

No.	Pos.	Nation	Player
—	DF	MEX	Aldo Polo (on loan from Puebla)
—	MF	USA	Paul Arriola (from (United States) Los Angeles Galaxy)
—	MF	MEX	Javier Güemez (from Dorados)
—	FW	USA	Herculez Gomez (from Santos Laguna)
—	FW	ARG	Darío Benedetto (from (Argentina) Arsenal)

Out: Note: Flags indicate national team as defined under FIFA eligibility rules; some limited exceptions apply. Players may hold more than one non-FIFA nationality.

No.	Pos.	Nation	Player
4	DF	MEX	Miguel Almazán (loan return to Toluca)
5	DF	MEX	Joshua Abrego (to Dorados)
9	FW	ARG	Alfredo Moreno (loan return to Chiapas)
17	FW	MEX	Jorge Hernandez (loan return to Atlante)
20	FW	COL	Duvier Riascos (to Pachuca)
29	FW	MEX	Raúl Nava (loan return to Toluca)
34	MF	MEX	Noé Maya (to Estudiantes Tecos)
—	FW	ECU	Jaime Ayoví (on loan to (Ecuador) LDU Quito)

=== Toluca ===
In: Note: Flags indicate national team as defined under FIFA eligibility rules; some limited exceptions apply. Players may hold more than one non-FIFA nationality.

No.	Pos.	Nation	Player
—	GK	MEX	César Lozano (on loan from Chiapas)
—	DF	MEX	Aaron Galindo (on loan from Santos Laguna)
—	DF	PAR	Paulo Da Silva (from Pachuca)
—	MF	MEX	Isaac Brizuela (loan return from Atlas)
—	MF	PAR	Richard Ortiz (from (Paraguay) Olimpia)
—	MF	MEX	Óscar Ricardo Rojas (on loan from UNAM, previously on loan at Atlante)
—	FW	PAR	Pablo Velázquez (from (Paraguay) Libertad)

Out: Note: Flags indicate national team as defined under FIFA eligibility rules; some limited exceptions apply. Players may hold more than one non-FIFA nationality.

No.	Pos.	Nation	Player
8	MF	BRA	Lucas Silva (to Monterrey)
20	FW	MEX	Flavio Santos (loan return to Atlas)
29	FW	PAN	Luis Tejada (on loan to Veracruz)

=== UANL ===
In: Note: Flags indicate national team as defined under FIFA eligibility rules; some limited exceptions apply. Players may hold more than one non-FIFA nationality.

No.	Pos.	Nation	Player
—	GK	MEX	Sergio García (from Guadalajara, previously on loan at Querétaro)
—	MF	MEX	Emilio López (on loan from Querétaro, previously on loan at Chiapas)
—	MF	MEX	Édgar Lugo (from Santos Laguna)

Out: Note: Flags indicate national team as defined under FIFA eligibility rules; some limited exceptions apply. Players may hold more than one non-FIFA nationality.

No.	Pos.	Nation	Player
10	MF	MEX	Elías Hernández (on loan to León)
23	FW	MEX	Taufic Guarch (loan return to Estudiantes Tecos)
—	MF	MEX	Francisco Acuña (on loan to Atlante, previously on loan at Chiapas)
—	DF	MEX	Fernando Navarro (on loan to León, previously on loan at Pachuca)

=== UNAM ===
In: Note: Flags indicate national team as defined under FIFA eligibility rules; some limited exceptions apply. Players may hold more than one non-FIFA nationality.

No.	Pos.	Nation	Player
—	FW	MEX	Cándido Ramírez (on loan from Santos Laguna)
—	FW	ARG	Ariel Nahuelpan (from (Ecuador) Barcelona)

Out: Note: Flags indicate national team as defined under FIFA eligibility rules; some limited exceptions apply. Players may hold more than one non-FIFA nationality.

No.	Pos.	Nation	Player
11	MF	MEX	Jehu Chiapas (to Veracruz)
15	FW	MEX	Eduardo Herrera (on loan to Santos Laguna)
—	MF	MEX	Óscar Ricardo Rojas (on loan to Toluca, previously on loan at Atlante)

=== Veracruz ===
^{[c]}

In: Note: Flags indicate national team as defined under FIFA eligibility rules; some limited exceptions apply. Players may hold more than one non-FIFA nationality.

No.	Pos.	Nation	Player
—	DF	MEX	Adrián Cortés (on loan from Guadalajara)
—	GK	MEX	Édgar Hernández (from Pachuca, previously on loan at Léon)
—	DF	COL	Leiton Jiménez (from Querétaro)
—	DF	MEX	Oscar Mascorro (from Chiapas, previously on loan at León)
—	MF	MEX	Jehu Chiapas (from UNAM)
—	MF	MEX	Israel Martínez (on loan from Atlante)
—	MF	ARG	Cristian Llama (on loan from (Italy) Calcio Catania, previously on loan at (Italy) Fiorentina)
—	MF	MEX	Ángel Reyna (on loan from C.F. Monterrey, previously on loan at C.F. Pachuca)
—	FW	PAN	Luis Tejada (on loan from Toluca)
—	FW	COL	Cristian Martínez (on loan from (Brazil) Caxias do Sul, previously on loan at (Colombia) Independiente de Santa Fe)

Out: Note: Flags indicate national team as defined under FIFA eligibility rules; some limited exceptions apply. Players may hold more than one non-FIFA nationality.

No.	Pos.	Nation	Player

== See also ==
- 2013–14 Liga MX season
