= Soccer Hall of Fame (Pachuca) =

FIFA's hall of fame for professional footballers

Coordinates: 20°05′42″N 98°46′27″W

- Established: July 9, 2011
- Founder: Grupo Pachuca (Note: Grupo Pachuca in collaboration with Grupo Carso owns a string of football clubs: CF Pachuca, Mineros de Zacatecas, Club León, Tlaxcala FC and Everton de Viña del Mar.), FIFA
- Inductees: 198 (Note: 198 inductees as of 2025.)

The Soccer Hall of Fame, (known as Salón de la Fama del Fútbol in Spanish) is a football museum and FIFA's hall of fame for professional footballers from Mexico and from all over the world. It is located in Pachuca, Mexico. The Hall of Fame includes two sections: Mexican and international football. It is currently the only official FIFA-recognized hall of fame.

== Background ==
In 2002 five days before the start of the World Cup, FIFA announced plans to open its own FIFA Hall of Fame in Valencia, Spain, with a planned inauguration of November 2004. The hall would be built and run as a joint venture between FIFA, Spain's football federation and the municipality of Valencia. However, the museum was never built.

A year later, in 2003 in Mexico, a proposal of a commemorative site for the personalities who contributed to the construction and success of soccer in the country became publicly known after a newspaper article written by Antonio Moreno. Afterwards, he was contacted by the president of the Pachuca Football Club, Jesús Martínez, who proposed to start a project for the materialization of his idea in Pachuca, the birthplace of Mexican football. The museum and hall of fame would be the anchor in the institution's plan to accompany the University of Football and the club's sports facilities. Jesús Martínez also suggested that the museum should be international and not only local.

== Museum ==
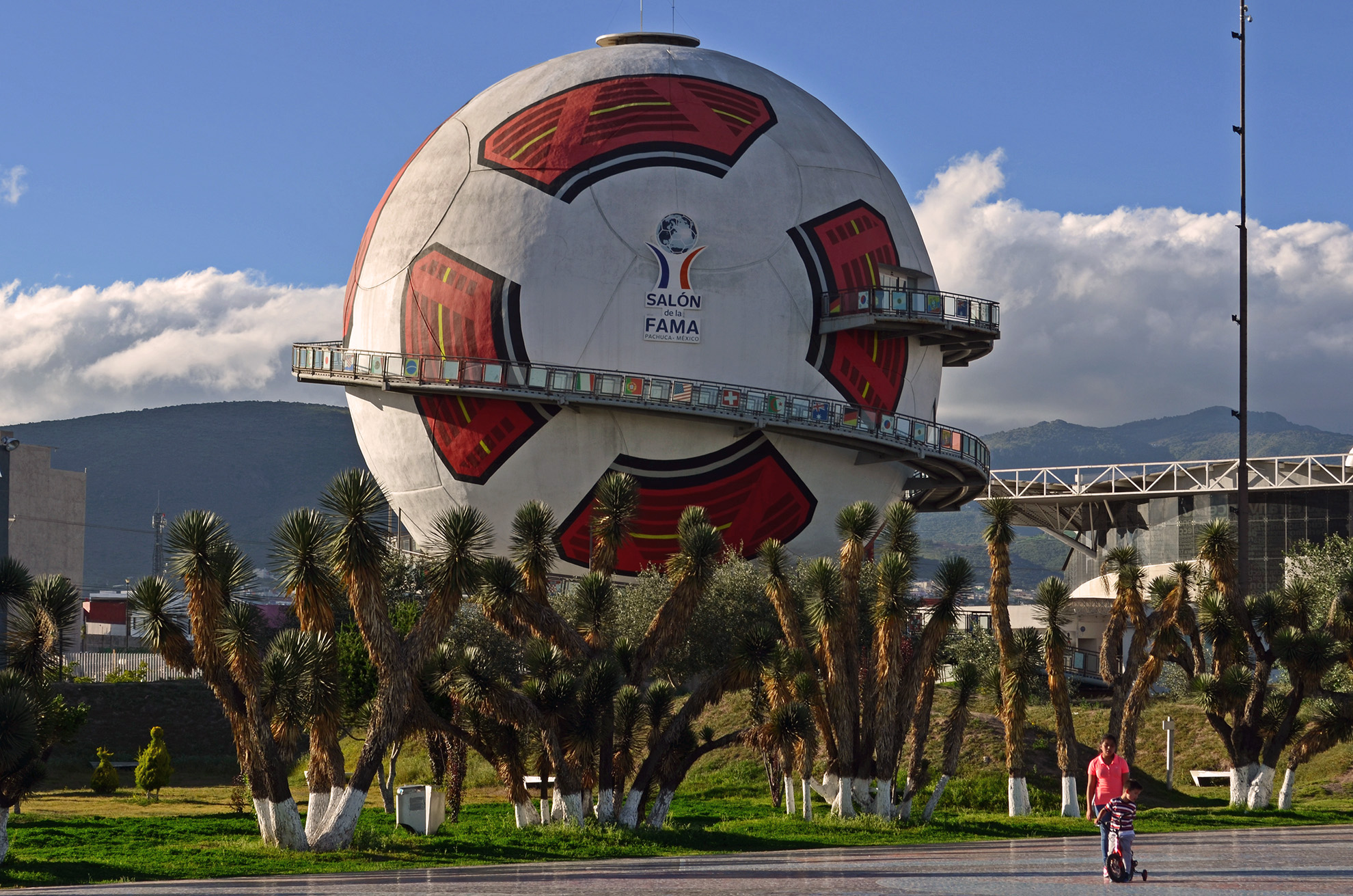
Exterior of the museum in Pachuca

On March 13, 2005, the David Ben Gurion Park was inaugurated; a Museum of Contemporary Art was originally planned in this complex. The building that would house the Museum of Contemporary Art was built between 2004 and 2005. In mid-2010, the Government of the state of Hidalgo ceded the building to the Pachuca Group, arguing that the building was abandoned. The building would house the Museum of Contemporary Art became the headquarters of the Mundo Fútbol Interactive Center, the Soccer Hall of Fame.

Construction work was completed on June 9, 2011, by the architect Ricardo Calderón Zorrilla, using reinforced concrete. The building is shaped like a sphere that emulates a huge soccer ball. It has a height of 38 m and a diameter of 36 m; It has three levels and 120 steps.

On July 9, 2011, the President of Mexico, Felipe Calderón Hinojosa, accompanied by the President of Chile, Sebastián Piñera Echenique and the head of FIFA, Sepp Blatter, inaugurated the Soccer Hall of Fame and the Mundo Fútbol Interactive Center. On November 8, 2011, the first Investiture Ceremony was held at the Gota de Plata Auditorium Theater, where 30 soccer players were inducted.

== Inductees ==
Source: rsssf.org

As a criterion to be inducted, a player must have participated at least a total of ten years in official international competitions, and have retired for five years.

- In italics players who were retired and eligible for selection in the inaugural Class of 2011, but they were inducted later.

=== Inaugural Class of 2011 ===
| Mexico | World |
|---|---|
| (Mexico) Ignacio Trelles; (Mexico) Enrique Borja; (Mexico) Jorge Campos (GK); (Mexico) Raúl Cárdenas; (Mexico) Salvador Reyes; (Chile) Carlos Reinoso; (Paraguay) José Cardozo; (Mexico) Guillermo Cañedo; (Mexico) Héctor Hernández; (Mexico) Luis de la Fuente; (Mexico) Horacio Casarín; (Argentina) Miguel Marín (GK); (Mexico) Hugo Sánchez; (Brazil) Cabinho; (Mexico) Antonio Carbajal (GK) | (Argentina) Alfredo Di Stéfano; (England) Bobby Charlton; (Portugal) Eusébio; (Germany) Franz Beckenbauer; (Hungary) Ferenc Puskás; (Germany) Gerd Müller; (Brazil) Garrincha; (Netherlands) Johan Cruyff; (Germany) Lothar Matthäus; (Soviet Union) Lev Yashin (GK); (France) Michel Platini; (Brazil) Mário Zagallo; (Argentina) Diego Maradona; (Brazil) Pelé; (France) Zinedine Zidane |

=== Class of 2012 ===
| Mexico | World | Deans |
|---|---|---|
| (Mexico) Carlos Hermosillo; (Ecuador) Alex Aguinaga; (Mexico) Luis Hernández; (Mexico) Jaime Gómez (GK); (Mexico) Benjamín Galindo; (Mexico) Cristóbal Ortega; (Mexico) Luís Roberto Alves; (Mexico) Manuel Negrete; (Mexico) Javier de la Torre; (Mexico) Guillermo Aguilar Álvarez | (England) Bobby Moore; (Italy) Dino Zoff; (Spain) Emilio Butragueño; (France) Just Fontaine; (France) Jules Rimet (executive); (Argentina) Mario Kempes; (Netherlands) Marco van Basten; (Uruguay) Obdulio Varela; (Netherlands) Rinus Michels (coach); (Spain) Ricardo Zamora (GK) | (Mexico) Fernando Marcos González (coach, referee); (Mexico) José Antonio Roca (coach); (Mexico) Juan Carreño |

=== Class of 2013 ===
| Mexico | World | Deans | Women |
|---|---|---|---|
| (Mexico) Luis Fernando Tena; (Serbia) Bora Milutinović; (Mexico) Alfredo Tena | (El Salvador) Mágico González; (Italy) Franco Baresi; (Liberia) George Weah (Note: George Weah, Cafu were inducted 10 years after their retirement. Others like David Beckham, Guardiola, Mágico González were inducted in 11 years, Valderrama in 12 years, Roberto Baggio, Emilio Butragueño and Hristo Stoichkov in 14, Franco Baresi, Higuita in 16, Kempes, Van Basten, Ruud Gullit in 17, Didier Deschamps in 18.); (Italy) Paolo Maldini (Note: Maldini, Xavi and Samuel Eto'o, Roberto Carlos were inducted the soonest, only 4 years after their retirement. Others like Ronaldo, Javier Zanetti, Ronaldinho, Raul, Iker Casillas were inducted in 5 years, Luis Figo, Kaka, Totti, Romário in 6, Diego Forlán and Pirlo in 7, Rivaldo in 8, Puyol and Cannavaro, Juan Román Riquelme in 9.) | (Mexico) Adalberto López; (Mexico) Rafael Garza Gutiérrez; (Argentina) Renato Cesarini | (United States) Mia Hamm |

=== Class of 2014 ===
| Mexico | World | Deans |
|---|---|---|
| (Mexico) Javier Aguirre; (Mexico) Leonardo Cuéllar; (Spain) Nemesio Diez; (Mexico) Manuel Lapuente | (Scotland) Alex Ferguson (coach); (Colombia) Carlos Valderrama; (Argentina) César Luis Menotti (coach); (Brazil) Romario | (Spain) Santiago Bernabéu (director); (Spain) Isidro Lángara; (Italy) Giuseppe Meazza |

=== Class of 2015 ===
| Mexico | World | Deans | Women |
|---|---|---|---|
| (Mexico) Luis García; (Mexico) Enrique Meza; (Mexico) Víctor Manuel Vucetich | (Argentina) Daniel Pasarella; (Portugal) Luis Figo; (Netherlands) Ruud Gullit; (Spain) Vicente del Bosque (coach) | (Argentina) Amadeo Carrizo (GK); (Uruguay) Alcides Ghiggia; (Hungary) Laszlo Kubala | (United States) Michelle Akers |

=== Class of 2016 ===
| Mexico | World | Deans | Women |
|---|---|---|---|
| (Mexico) Claudio Suárez; (Mexico) Jared Borgetti; (Brazil) Ricardo Ferretti | (Germany) Karl-Heinz Rummenigge; (Italy) Paolo Rossi; (Brazil) Ronaldo; (Brazil) Zico | (Spain) Telmo Zarra; (Mexico) Francisco 'Panchito' Hernández; (Mexico) José Luis Lamadrid | (China) Sun Wen |

=== Class of 2017 ===
| Mexico | World | Deans | Women |
|---|---|---|---|
| (Mexico) Alberto García Aspe; (Uruguay) Carlos Miloc; (Mexico) Ramón Ramírez | (Uruguay) Enzo Francescoli; (Bulgaria) Hristo Stoichkov; (Spain) Pep Guardiola; (Argentina) Jorge Valdano | (Spain) Francisco Gento; (Mexico) Ignacio Calderón (GK); (Mexico) Guillermo Sepúlveda | (Germany) Birgit Prinz |

=== Class of 2018 ===
| Mexico | World | Deans | Women |
|---|---|---|---|
| (Mexico) Fernando Bustos; (Argentina) Héctor Zelada (GK); (Mexico) Miguel Mejía Barón | (Argentina) Carlos Bilardo (coach); (Brazil) Cafu; (Italy) Roberto Baggio; (Brazil) Roberto Rivellino | (Mexico) Aarón Padilla; (Brazil) Arlindo dos Santos; (Uruguay) Juan Alberto Schiaffino | (Mexico) María Eugenia Rubio; (Germany) Silvia Neid |

=== Class of 2019 ===
| Mexico | World | Deans | Women |
|---|---|---|---|
| (Mexico) Pável Pardo; (Colombia) Miguel Calero (GK); (Mexico) Tomás Boy | (France) Didier Deschamps; (Argentina) Gabriel Batistuta; (Italy) Arrigo Sacchi (coach); (Argentina) Javier Zanetti | (Mexico) Tomás Balcázar; (Mexico) Gustavo Peña; (France) Raymond Kopa | (Mexico) Alicia Vargas; (Brazil) Sissi |

=== Class of 2020 ===
| Mexico | World | Deans | Women |
|---|---|---|---|
| (Mexico) Pablo Larios (GK); (Brazil) Antônio Carlos; (Mexico) Oswaldo Sánchez (GK) | (Brazil) Ronaldinho; (Italy) Fabio Cannavaro; (Spain) Raúl González; (Brazil) Roberto Carlos | (Mexico) Vicente Pereda; (Mexico) Jesús del Muro; (Brazil) Didi | (Mexico) Maribel Domínguez; (Sweden) Pia Sundhage |

=== Class of 2023 ===
| Mexico | World | Deans | Women |
|---|---|---|---|
| (Mexico) Rafael Márquez; (Mexico) Cuauhtémoc Blanco; (Mexico) Óscar Pérez (GK); (Mexico) Fernando Quirarte; (Argentina) Ricardo La Volpe; (Mexico) Emilio Azcárraga Milmo | (Italy) Carlo Ancelotti (coach); (Italy) Francesco Totti; (Spain) Carles Puyol; (Spain) Xavi; (Brazil) Kaká; (Brazil) Rivaldo; (Cameroon) Samuel Eto'o | (Brazil) José Alves "Zague"; (Mexico) Isidoro Díaz; (Germany) Uwe Seeler | (Brazil) Pretinha; (Mexico) Andrea Rodebaugh |

=== Class of 2024 ===
| Mexico | World | Deans | Women |
|---|---|---|---|
| (Mexico) Sinha; (Chile) Rodrigo Ruiz; (Mexico) Carlos Salcido; (Mexico) Ricardo Peláez; (Argentina) Hernán Cristante (GK); (Mexico) Omar Bravo | (Italy) Andrea Pirlo; (England) David Beckham; (Germany) Oliver Kahn (GK); (Argentina) Juan Román Riquelme; (Chile) Iván Zamorano; (Argentina) Diego Simeone; (Paraguay) José Luis Chilavert (GK) | (Mexico) Jaime Belmonte; (Peru) Walter Ormeño (GK); (Germany) Sepp Maier | (Mexico) Esther Mora; (United States) Kristine Lilly |

=== Class of 2025 ===
| Mexico | World | Deans | Women |
|---|---|---|---|
| (Mexico) Luis Flores; (Mexico) Miguel España; (Mexico) Ignacio Ambríz; (Brazil) Tita; (Mexico) Francisco Palencia; (Mexico) Gerardo Torrado | (Spain) Iker Casillas (GK); (Brazil) Carlos Dunga; (England) Gary Lineker; (Netherlands) Ronald Koeman; (Colombia) René Higuita (GK); (Uruguay) Diego Forlán | (Chile) Osvaldo Castro; (Mexico) Bernardo Hernández; (Argentina) Ubaldo Fillol (GK); (Spain) José Martínez "Pirri" | (Mexico) Guadalupe Tovar; (United States) Abby Wambach |

=== Class of 2026 ===
| Mexico | World | Deans | Women |
|---|---|---|---|
| (Mexico) Oribe Peralta; (Mexico) Christian Giménez; (Argentina) Antonio Mohamed; (Mexico) Ramón Morales; (Chile) Fabián Estay; (Chile) Humberto Suazo | (France) Thierry Henry; (Italy) Alessandro Del Piero; (Brazil) Bebeto; (Germany) Miroslav Klose; (Spain) Fernando Torres; (Croatia) Davor Šuker | (Peru) Teófilo Cubillas; (Brazil) Sócrates; (Peru) Gerónimo Barbadillo; (Mexico) Ignacio Flores | (Mexico) Mónica Vergara; (Japan) Homare Sawa |

== See also ==
- FIFA World Cup awards
- FIFA Museum
- International Football Hall of Champions

== Sources ==
- All Hall of Famers (Ranked)
