= Copa Pachuca 99 =

Tournament details
- Teams: 8
- Venue: Estadio Hidalgo

Final positions
- Champions: (Mexico) Guadalajara (Brazil) São Paulo

Tournament statistics
- Matches played: 8
- Goals scored: 22 (2.75 per match)

Copa Pachuca 99 was an edition of the Copa Pachuca in Mexico. Guadalajara and São Paulo managed to snag the first Copa Pachuca championship in their only participation in the tournament up to date. This tournament set a tradition for Pachuca that would soon be recognized as La Cuna de Futbol.

== First tournament ==
Source: Senor Gol

Teams

Team	GP	W	D	L	GF	GA
(Mexico) Guadalajara	2	2	0	0	3	0
(Mexico) Pumas UNAM	2	1	0	1	3	2
(Mexico) Monarcas Morelia	2	1	0	1	2	3
(Mexico) Pachuca	2	0	0	2	0	3

Bracket

Semi-finals
8 January – Estadio Hidalgo
Pachuca	0
Guadalajara	1
8 January – Estadio Hidalgo
Monarcas Morelia	2
Pumas UNAM	1

Final
9 January – Estadio Hidalgo
Guadalajara	2
Monarcas Morelia	0
Third place
9 January – Estadio Hidalgo
Pachuca	0
Pumas UNAM	2

== Second tournament ==
Source: RSSSF

Semi-finals
20 July – Estadio Hidalgo
Cruz Azul	1 (9)
Pumas UNAM	1 (8)
20 July – Estadio Hidalgo
Pachuca	0
São Paulo	3

Final
22 July – Estadio Hidalgo
Cruz Azul	0
São Paulo	5
Third place
22 July – Estadio Hidalgo
Pachuca	2 (6)
Pumas UNAM	2 (7)
