= 1990–91 Mexican Primera División season =

49th professional season of the top-flight football league in Mexico

Primera División de México
- Season: 1990–91
- Champions: UNAM (3rd title)
- Relegated: Irapuato
- Champions' Cup: UNAM; América
- Matches: 394
- Goals: 1,004 (2.55 per match)

These are statistics of Primera División de México for the 1990–91 season.

== Overview ==
It was contested by 20 teams, and Pumas de la UNAM won the championship.

León was promoted from Segunda División.

Querétaro bought the franchise of Tampico Madero, which allowed the team to return to Primera División.

Irapauto was relegated to Segunda División.

=== Teams ===
Location of the 1990-91 Primera División teams

Team	City	Stadium
América	Mexico City	Azteca
Atlas	Guadalajara, Jalisco	Jalisco
Cobras	Ciudad Juárez, Chihuahua	Olímpico Benito Juárez
Cruz Azul	Mexico City	Azteca
Guadalajara	Guadalajara, Jalisco	Jalisco
León	León, Guanajuato	Nou Camp
Irapuato	Irapuato, Guanajuato	Irapuato
Morelia	Morelia, Michoacán	Morelos
Monterrey	Monterrey, Nuevo León	Tecnológico
Necaxa	Mexico City	Azteca
Puebla	Puebla, Puebla	Cuauhtémoc
Querétaro	Querétaro, Querétaro	Corregidora
Santos Laguna	Torreón, Coahuila	Corona
Tecos	Zapopan, Jalisco	Tres de Marzo
Toluca	Toluca, State of Mexico	Toluca 70-86
UANL	Monterrey, Nuevo León	Universitario
UAT	Ciudad Victoria, Tamaulipas	Estadio Marte R. Gómez
UdeG	Guadalajara, Jalisco	Jalisco
UNAM	Mexico City	Olímpico Universitario
Veracruz	Veracruz, Veracruz	Luis "Pirata" Fuente

== Group stage ==
=== Group 1 ===
Pos	Team	Pld	W	D	L	GF	GA	GD	Pts	Qualification
1	América	38	15	13	10	61	53	+8	43	Playoff
2	Morelia	38	10	15	13	48	51	−3	35	Playoff
3	Necaxa	38	12	11	15	61	71	−10	35	
4	Tecos	38	10	13	15	43	51	−8	33	
5	Santos	38	6	14	18	35	53	−18	26	

=== Group 2 ===
Pos	Team	Pld	W	D	L	GF	GA	GD	Pts	Qualification
1	UNAM	38	25	5	8	67	30	+37	55	Playoff
2	Cruz Azul	38	15	15	8	47	38	+9	45	Playoff
3	Veracruz	38	15	10	13	59	55	+4	40	
4	Toluca	38	12	14	12	53	50	+3	38	
5	Correcaminos	38	10	15	13	35	46	−11	35	

=== Group 3 ===
Pos	Team	Pld	W	D	L	GF	GA	GD	Pts	Qualification or relegation
1	Guadalajara	38	10	21	7	43	36	+7	41	Playoff
2	Puebla	38	14	11	13	40	43	−3	39	Playoff
3	UANL	38	12	12	14	45	49	−4	36	
4	Querétaro	38	8	14	16	49	57	−8	30	
5	Irapuato	38	7	12	19	38	72	−34	26	Relegated

=== Group 4 ===
Pos	Team	Pld	W	D	L	GF	GA	GD	Pts	Qualification
1	Monterrey	38	19	9	10	62	42	+20	47	Playoff
2	U. de G.	38	16	11	11	47	40	+7	43	Playoff
3	León	38	16	9	13	55	42	+13	41	
4	Atlas	38	15	10	13	38	32	+6	40	
5	Cobras	38	9	14	15	38	53	−15	32	

== Results ==
Home \ Away	AME	ATS	COB	CAZ	GDL	LEO	IRA	MTY	MOR	NEC	PUE	QRO	SAN	TEC	TOL	UNL	UAT	UDG	UNM	VER
América	—	0–1	2–0	3–3	2–2	3–1	5–2	2–2	1–2	1–1	3–1	1–0	4–1	2–1	3–3	2–0	2–1	2–0	1–0	1–0
Atlas	2–2	—	0–0	3–0	1–0	2–0	1–2	1–0	2–0	2–2	2–1	2–1	0–1	0–3	1–0	3–2	2–0	0–1	3–0	0–0
Cobras	2–2	0–0	—	1–1	2–2	0–3	1–0	0–0	0–0	1–1	0–0	3–2	3–0	2–0	1–1	1–0	1–1	1–0	2–3	1–0
Cruz Azul	1–1	1–1	3–0	—	0–2	2–1	1–1	2–2	2–1	2–1	1–3	2–2	1–0	2–1	3–0	1–0	0–0	2–0	1–2	4–1
Guadalajara	1–1	0–0	0–1	0–0	—	1–1	1–0	1–1	1–1	1–1	0–0	1–1	0–0	2–0	1–1	1–1	1–1	1–1	0–0	2–1
León	3–0	0–1	3–1	0–1	2–3	—	1–0	0–0	2–1	4–0	0–0	3–1	2–0	4–0	1–0	3–1	1–0	1–0	1–1	1–1
Irapuato	0–0	1–0	3–0	0–0	0–2	3–3	—	1–4	1–1	1–2	3–1	1–0	0–0	0–0	1–1	3–1	2–1	0–7	1–6	0–0
Monterrey	1–0	1–1	1–0	0–1	2–1	2–1	2–1	—	3–4	4–0	1–2	4–2	3–4	2–1	3–1	4–1	1–0	4–2	2–0	1–0
Morelia	2–2	2–0	1–1	1–2	2–1	3–0	3–2	0–0	—	2–1	0–1	1–1	0–0	2–0	2–2	1–1	1–1	0–0	2–3	4–3
Necaxa	2–0	0–1	3–2	1–1	1–3	0–4	4–1	1–2	2–3	—	2–0	4–4	3–1	1–0	1–1	0–1	4–1	2–1	0–3	3–1
Puebla	1–1	2–1	2–0	0–1	1–3	1–3	3–1	0–1	1–2	3–1	—	2–1	1–0	1–1	2–2	2–0	0–0	0–1	1–3	1–1
Querétaro	1–2	1–0	2–0	1–1	2–3	0–0	1–1	3–1	1–0	1–2	0–0	—	1–1	2–2	2–1	0–0	1–1	0–1	4–2	3–3
Santos	1–1	0–0	1–3	1–2	1–1	0–1	3–0	1–2	0–0	1–0	0–1	1–2	—	2–2	1–1	2–0	1–1	0–1	0–0	4–3
Tecos	1–2	3–2	4–2	0–0	2–1	1–0	0–0	0–0	2–1	3–3	2–1	1–1	4–4	—	2–0	0–1	0–0	1–1	1–0	1–0
Toluca	2–0	1–0	3–0	1–1	2–0	1–1	2–0	2–1	2–1	2–3	0–1	2–1	1–0	2–1	—	0–0	5–0	1–1	0–2	2–0
UANL	3–1	1–0	3–2	2–0	2–2	4–1	2–1	2–1	1–0	2–2	1–1	2–1	3–1	1–1	3–3	—	0–1	0–1	1–2	1–1
UAT	2–1	0–0	3–2	0–0	0–1	2–1	0–0	0–2	3–1	5–3	2–0	0–3	1–1	2–1	1–1	0–0	—	2–0	0–1	2–0
U. de G.	1–0	1–0	1–1	2–1	1–0	1–1	6–2	1–1	2–2	1–1	0–1	1–0	2–0	1–0	3–1	2–1	1–1	—	0–2	1–2
UNAM	5–2	1–2	1–0	1–0	1–1	2–1	4–1	1–0	1–0	2–0	0–1	2–0	1–0	2–0	2–0	0–0	3–0	5–0	—	2–0
Veracruz	1–3	2–1	1–1	2–1	0–0	3–0	3–2	2–1	3–0	3–3	4–1	3–0	2–1	2–1	4–3	2–1	2–0	1–1	2–1	—

Updated to match(es) played on 2 June 1991. Source: RSSSF
Legend: Blue = home team win; Yellow = draw; Red = away team win.

== Final phase ==
=== Bracket ===
Quarter-finals
1	UNAM	1	5	6
13	Morelia	0	1	1
2	Monterrey	0	1	1
10	Puebla	4	0	4
4	América	0	3	3
5	UDG	0	0	1
3	Cruz Azul	0	2	2
7	Guadalajara	3	5	8

Semi-finals
1	UNAM	2	1	1
10	Puebla	0	0	0
4	América	2	3	5
7	Guadalajara	0	0	0

Finals
1	UNAM (a)	2	1	3
4	América	3	0	3

=== Finals ===
Team 1	Agg.	Team 2	1st leg	2nd leg
América	3–3 (a)	UNAM	3–2	0–1
