= Miguel Ángel Ayala =

Chilean footballer (born 1981)

Personal information
- Full name: Miguel Ángel Ayala Valladares
- Date of birth: 26 July 1981 (age 45)
- Place of birth: Talca, Chile
- Height: 1.81 m (5 ft 11 in)
- Position: Defender

Senior career*
Years	Team	Apps	(Gls)
2001–2003	Curicó Unido	–	(–)
2003	Deportes Linares	–	(–)
2004–2006	Rangers	75	(3)
2007	Deportes Concepción	10	(0)
2007–2010	Deportes Iquique	73	(7)
2011	Rangers	29	(1)
2012	Unión Temuco	22	(1)
2013–2014	Deportes Concepción	45	(2)
2014–2015	Santiago Morning	32	(1)
2015–2016	Deportes Linares	28	(4)
Total		314	(19)
- * Club domestic league appearances and goals

Miguel Ángel Ayala Valladares (born 26 July 1981) is a Chilean former footballer who played as a defender.

== Honours ==
=== Player ===
Deportes Iquique

- Primera B de Chile (1): 2010
- Copa Chile (1): 2010
