= Copa Pachuca =

- Organiser(s): Mexican Football Federation
- Founded: 1994
- Abolished: 2014
- Region: Mexico
- Teams: 4
- Related competitions: Liga MX
- Last champions: Pachuca
- Most championships: Pachuca (6 titles)

The Copa Pachuca, sometimes referred to as La Cuna del Fútbol, was a short preparation tournament for the Liga MX. The tournament was always held in Pachuca's stadium, which has been the Estadio Hidalgo.

== History ==
Copa Pachuca had XIX issues, and became the most important tournament in the Mexican football pre-season. The first edition of the tournament was played in August 1994, and since then the competition served to reinforce its guests club's pre-season. Notably, in the first edition of Copa Pachuca, it managed to involve the 3 so-called "big teams" of México, Club America, Cruz Azul, and Pumas UNAM; thus beginning the history and tradition of the most important Mexican pre-season tournament.

== Format ==
Copa Pachuca was a quick preparation tournament where each participating team only got to play two games. The tournament started in the semi-final round with only one legged games. The two teams that win their first game move onto the final. The two teams that lost their first game, played a game against each other for third place. All games were treated like playoff games. In case of a tie, the two teams would move onto penalties.

== Results ==
Year	Final			Third place match		
Year	Winners	Score	Runners-up	Third place	Score	Fourth place
1994	(Mexico) Pumas UNAM	3–2	(Mexico) Club América	(Mexico) Cruz Azul	2–1	(Mexico) Pachuca
1995	(Mexico) Club América	4–1	(Costa Rica) Saprissa	(Mexico) Cruz Azul	2–1	(Mexico) Pachuca
1997	(Mexico) Club América	3–1	(Mexico) Atlético Celaya	(Mexico) Pachuca	4–0	(Mexico) Atlético Hidalgo
1997	(Mexico) Cruz Azul	1–0	(Mexico) Club América	(Mexico) Pachuca	1–0	(Mexico) Atlante
1998	(Mexico) Cruz Azul	1–0	(Mexico) Pachuca	(Mexico) Club América	4–1	(Mexico) Atlante
1999	(Mexico) Guadalajara	2–0	(Mexico) Monarcas Morelia	(Mexico) Pumas UNAM	2–0	(Mexico) Pachuca
1999	(Brazil) São Paulo	5–0	(Mexico) Cruz Azul	(Mexico) Pumas UNAM	2–2 (7–6)	(Mexico) Pachuca
2000	(Mexico) Pachuca	1–0	(Mexico) Cruz Azul	(Mexico) Atlético Celaya	1–1 (6–5)	(Mexico) Puebla
2001	(Mexico) Monarcas Morelia	1–0	(Mexico) Pachuca	(Mexico) Pumas UNAM	4–1	(Mexico) León
2002	(Mexico) Cruz Azul	1–1 (5–3)	(Mexico) Pachuca	(Mexico) Pumas UNAM	2–0	(Mexico) Atlético Celaya
2004	(Mexico) Pachuca	3–3 (5–4)	(Mexico) Toluca	(Mexico) Cruz Azul	1–0	(Mexico) Monarcas Morelia
2005	(Mexico) Atlas	2–2 (4–3)	(Mexico) Pachuca	(Mexico) Cruz Azul	2–1	(Mexico) Puebla
2005	(Mexico) Atlante	4–2	(Mexico) Cruz Azul	(Mexico) Pachuca	2–1	(Mexico) Monarcas Morelia
2006	(Mexico) Cruz Azul	5–2	(Mexico) Pachuca	(Mexico) Indios	1–0	(Mexico) Veracruz
2009	(Mexico) Pachuca	2–2 (7–6)	(Mexico) Atlante	(Mexico) Monarcas Morelia	2–0	(Mexico) Querétaro
2011	(Mexico) Pachuca	2–2 (3–1)	(Mexico) Monarcas Morelia	(Mexico) Pumas UNAM	1–0	(Costa Rica) Saprissa
2012	(Mexico) León	3–1	(Mexico) Pachuca	(Mexico) Puebla	2–1	(Mexico) Jaguares
2013	(Mexico) Pachuca	4–4 (5–4)	(Mexico) León	(Mexico) Cruz Azul	4–1	(Mexico) Estudiantes UAG
2013	(Mexico) Puebla	3–1	(Mexico) Pumas UNAM	(Mexico) Estudiantes UAG	3–0	(Mexico) Pachuca
2014	(Mexico) Pachuca	2–0	(Mexico) Pumas UNAM	(Costa Rica) AD Santos	2–2 (3–2)	(Mexico) Toluca

== Performances ==
Team	Participations	Titles	Years won	Years runners-up
(Mexico) Pachuca	19	6	2000, 2004, 2009, 2011, 2013, 2014	1998, 2001, 2002, 2005, 2006, 2012
(Mexico) Cruz Azul	12	4	1997, 1998, 2002, 2006	1999, 2000, 2005
(Mexico) Club América	5	2	1995, 1997	1994, 1997
(Mexico) Monarcas Morelia	5	1	2001	1999, 2011
(Mexico) Pumas UNAM	7	1	1994	2013, 2014
(Mexico) Atlante	4	1	2005	2009
(Mexico) León	3	1	2012	2013
(Mexico) Guadalajara	1	1	1999	
(Brazil) São Paulo	1	1	1999	
(Mexico) Atlas	1	1	2005	
(Mexico) Puebla	1	1	2013	
(Costa Rica) Saprissa	1	0		1995
(Mexico) Atlético Celaya	1	0		1997
(Mexico) Toluca	1	0		2004
