= Pre-Libertadores tournament =

Pre-Libertadores tournament was a qualifying association football competition for the Copa Libertadores between clubs from Mexico and Venezuela, it was held from 1998 to 2002. The tournament consisted of two rounds, the preliminary round was a tournament known as Selectivo Pre Pre-Libertadores between Mexican clubs interested in participating, and the final round was a tournament known as Copa Pre-Libertadores, between the champions and runners-up of the Liga FUTVE and the two Mexican clubs that qualified from the preliminary round.

== History ==
The tournament was an initiative of Mexican promoters, close to the Mexican Football Federation (FMF) and the Televisa company, who sought to get Mexican teams into CONMEBOL continental club competition.

In 1997, Grupo Pegaso (founded by Alejandro Burillo Azcárraga), through promoter Eduardo Aguirre, began talks with the Venezuelan league clubs and the FVF to purchase the slots that corresponded to Venezuelan teams in the Copa Libertadores (2 direct slots at that time). Negotiations lasted until December of that year when the parties reached an agreement in a meeting held in Asunción, Paraguay; the two Venezuelan slots in the Copa Libertadores would be disputed in a qualifying tournament by two Venezuelan and two Mexican teams, in exchange, the Mexican side was to make a payment of US$200,000 to each Venezuelan team participating and US$80,000 to the FVF. The agreement had CONMEBOL's approval, however, CONCACAF's permission was still needed to allow the Mexican teams to participate.

In early January 1998, Rafael Esquivel, president of the FVF at the time, and his treasurer Emiliano Rodríguez traveled to Mexico to finalize the details of the tournament and then to the United States to meet with CONCACAF authorities. Finally, CONCACAF authorized the participation of the Mexican teams and 3 February is announced as the start date of the tournament.

The competition was replaced by the InterLiga in 2004, as the qualification method for Mexican clubs.

== Competition format ==
The Selectivo Pre Pre-Libertadores was the preliminary round of the competition, and was played between Mexican clubs interested in participating, and the matches were held in the United States. The format of this round varied depending on the number of interested clubs each year, and the best two clubs qualified to the final round.

The Copa Pre-Libertadores was the final round, and was played between four clubs, two from Venezuela defined through the Apertura and Clausura tournaments of the Liga FUTVE and the two clubs from Mexico defined by the preliminary round. The Mexican and Venezuelan clubs faced each other in round-trip matches, except with the club from the same country. The best two in a round-robin format qualified directly to the group stage of the Copa Libertadores.

== Results ==
=== Selectivo Pre Pre-Libertadores ===
The preliminary round was a tournament between Mexican clubs, and played the year before the final round. The best two, qualified to the Copa Pre-Libertadores.

Year	Qualified to Copa Pre-Libertadores		Teams
1998	Monterrey	Necaxa	10
1999	Atlas	América	5
2000	Cruz Azul	Atlante	5
2001	América	Morelia	5
2002	Pumas UNAM	Cruz Azul	6

=== Copa Pre-Libertadores ===
In six editions, ten Mexican clubs and two Venezuelan clubs qualified for the Copa Libertadores.

Ed.	Year	Qualified to Copa Libertadores		Eliminated	
1	1998-I	(Mexico) Guadalajara	(Mexico) América	(Venezuela) Caracas	(Venezuela) Atlético Zulia
2	1998-II	(Mexico) Monterrey	(Venezuela) Estudiantes de Mérida	(Mexico) Necaxa	(Venezuela) Universidad de Los Andes
3	1999	(Mexico) Atlas	(Mexico) América	(Venezuela) Deportivo Italchacao	(Venezuela) Deportivo Táchira
4	2000	(Mexico) Cruz Azul	(Venezuela) Deportivo Táchira	(Venezuela) Deportivo Italchacao	(Mexico) Atlante
5	2001	(Mexico) América	(Mexico) Morelia	(Venezuela) Caracas	(Venezuela) Trujillanos
6	2002	(Mexico) Pumas UNAM	(Mexico) Cruz Azul	(Venezuela) Estudiantes de Mérida	(Venezuela) Nacional Táchira
