= 1997 Copa América squads =

List of footballers

Below are the rosters of the teams that participated in the 1997 Copa América.

== Group A ==
=== Argentina ===
Head coach: Daniel Passarella

Argentina decided to alphabetically sort the numbers of their squad. This would be the last time they do so.

No.	Pos.	Player	Date of birth (age)	Caps	Goals	Club
1	MF	Christian Bassedas	16 February 1973 (aged 24)	14	0	(Argentina) Vélez Sarsfield
2	DF	Eduardo Berizzo	13 November 1969 (aged 27)	5	0	(Argentina) River Plate
3	MF	Sergio Berti	17 September 1969 (aged 27)	10	1	(Argentina) River Plate
4	FW	José Luis Calderón	24 October 1970 (aged 26)	2	0	(Argentina) Independiente
5	MF	Rodolfo Cardoso	17 October 1968 (aged 28)	1	1	(Germany) Hamburger SV
6	DF	Raúl Cardozo	28 October 1967 (aged 29)	0	0	(Argentina) Vélez Sarsfield
7	FW	Julio Cruz	10 October 1974 (aged 22)	1	0	(Argentina) River Plate
8	FW	Marcelo Delgado	24 March 1973 (aged 24)	3	0	(Argentina) Racing Club
9	MF	Marcelo Gallardo	18 January 1976 (aged 21)	12	5	(Argentina) River Plate
10	GK	Nacho González	17 December 1971 (aged 25)	3	0	(Argentina) Racing Club
11	MF	Claudio Husaín	20 November 1974 (aged 22)	0	0	(Argentina) Vélez Sarsfield
12	MF	Gustavo Adrián López	13 April 1973 (aged 24)	7	2	(Spain) Real Zaragoza
13	DF	Jorge Martínez	20 June 1973 (aged 23)	0	0	(Argentina) Independiente
14	MF	Roberto Monserrat	13 September 1968 (aged 28)	4	0	(Argentina) River Plate
15	GK	Marcelo Ojeda	8 December 1968 (aged 28)	0	0	(Spain) Tenerife
16	DF	Mauricio Pellegrino	5 October 1971 (aged 25)	0	0	(Argentina) Vélez Sarsfield
17	DF	Mauricio Pineda	13 July 1975 (aged 21)	0	0	(Argentina) Boca Juniors
18	FW	Martín Posse	2 August 1975 (aged 21)	0	0	(Argentina) Vélez Sarsfield
19	GK	Carlos Roa	15 August 1969 (aged 27)	2	0	(Argentina) Lanús
20	DF	Pablo Rotchen	23 April 1973 (aged 24)	1	0	(Argentina) Independiente
21	DF	Nelson Vivas	18 October 1969 (aged 27)	7	0	(Argentina) Boca Juniors
22	MF	Gustavo Zapata (c)	15 October 1967 (aged 29)	20	0	(Argentina) San Lorenzo

=== Chile ===
Head coach: (Uruguay) Nelson Acosta

No.	Pos.	Player	Date of birth (age)	Caps	Goals	Club
1	GK	Nelson Cossio	14 June 1966 (aged 30)	1	0	(Chile) Audax Italiano
2	DF	Jorge Gómez	14 September 1968 (aged 28)	0	0	(Chile) Temuco
3	DF	Dante Poli	15 August 1976 (aged 20)	1	0	(Chile) Universidad Católica
4	DF	Marcelo Miranda	29 January 1967 (aged 30)	14	0	(Chile) Cobreloa
5	DF	Javier Margas (c)	10 May 1969 (aged 28)	39	3	(Chile) Universidad Católica
6	MF	Nelson Parraguez	5 April 1971 (aged 26)	24	0	(Chile) Universidad Católica
7	FW	Claudio Núñez	16 October 1975 (aged 21)	9	0	(Mexico) Tigres UANL
8	MF	Fernando Cornejo	28 January 1969 (aged 28)	12	2	(Chile) Cobreloa
9	FW	Fernando Vergara	13 May 1970 (aged 27)	3	2	(Chile) Colo-Colo
10	MF	Esteban Valencia	8 January 1972 (aged 25)	22	3	Universidad de Chile
11	MF	Juan Castillo	29 October 1970 (aged 26)	4	1	(Chile) Temuco
12	GK	Carlos Tejas	4 October 1971 (aged 25)	0	0	(Chile) Coquimbo
13	MF	Moisés Villarroel	12 February 1976 (aged 21)	1	0	(Chile) Santiago Wanderers
14	DF	Miguel Ponce	19 August 1971 (aged 25)	2	0	Universidad de Chile
15	MF	Clarence Acuña	8 February 1975 (aged 22)	11	0	Universidad de Chile
16	MF	Pedro González	17 October 1967 (aged 29)	13	3	(Chile) Cobreloa
17	MF	Mario Salas	11 October 1967 (aged 29)	3	0	(Chile) Colo-Colo
18	MF	Jaime Riveros	27 November 1970 (aged 26)	5	2	(Chile) Cobreloa
19	DF	Raúl Muñoz	25 May 1975 (aged 22)	1	0	(Chile) Colo-Colo
20	DF	Ricardo Rojas	7 May 1974 (aged 23)	3	0	Universidad de Chile
21	MF	Alejandro Osorio	24 September 1976 (aged 20)	0	0	(Chile) Universidad Católica
22	DF	Rafael Olarra	26 May 1978 (aged 19)	0	0	(Chile) Audax Italiano

=== Ecuador ===
Head cocah: (Colombia) Francisco Maturana

No.	Pos.	Player	Date of birth (age)	Caps	Goals	Club
1	GK	José Cevallos	17 April 1971 (aged 26)			(Ecuador) Barcelona
2	MF	Marco Constante	17 April 1971 (aged 26)			(Ecuador) El Nacional
3	DF	Ulises de la Cruz	8 February 1974 (aged 23)			(Ecuador) LDU Quito
4	DF	Edmundo Méndez	5 December 1968 (aged 28)			(Ecuador) Deportivo Cuenca
5	DF	Máximo Tenorio	30 September 1969 (aged 27)			(Ecuador) Barcelona
6	DF	Luis Capurro (c)	1 May 1962 (aged 35)			(Ecuador) Barcelona
7	MF	Wellington Sánchez	19 June 1974 (aged 22)			(Ecuador) El Nacional
8	MF	Héctor Carabalí	15 February 1972 (aged 25)			(Ecuador) Barcelona
9	FW	Eduardo Hurtado	2 December 1969 (aged 27)			(United States) Los Angeles Galaxy
10	MF	José Gavica	8 January 1969 (aged 28)			(Ecuador) Barcelona
11	FW	Ángel Fernández	2 August 1971 (aged 25)			(Ecuador) Emelec
12	GK	Oswaldo Ibarra	8 September 1969 (aged 27)			(Ecuador) El Nacional
13	FW	Agustín Delgado	23 December 1974 (aged 22)			(Ecuador) Barcelona
14	DF	Alberto Montaño	23 March 1970 (aged 27)			(Ecuador) Barcelona
15	MF	Hidrobo Rosero	24 August 1974 (aged 22)			(Ecuador) El Nacional
16	MF	Eduardo Smith	23 February 1966 (aged 31)			(Ecuador) Emelec
17	MF	Juan Carlos Burbano	15 February 1969 (aged 28)			(Ecuador) El Nacional
18	FW	Edison Maldonado	7 June 1972 (aged 25)			(Ecuador) Aucas
19	MF	Cléber Chalá	29 June 1971 (aged 25)			(Ecuador) El Nacional
20	FW	Ariel Graziani	7 June 1971 (aged 26)			(Ecuador) Emelec
21	MF	Héctor González	4 May 1972 (aged 25)			(Ecuador) Olmedo
22	GK	Alex Cevallos	3 August 1967 (aged 29)			(Ecuador) Emelec

=== Paraguay ===
Head coach: (Brazil) Paulo César Carpegiani

No.	Pos.	Player	Date of birth (age)	Caps	Goals	Club
1	GK	José Luis Chilavert (c)	27 July 1965 (aged 31)			(Argentina) Vélez Sarsfield
2	DF	Francisco Arce	2 April 1971 (aged 26)			(Brazil) Grêmio
3	DF	Celso Ayala	20 August 1970 (aged 26)			(Argentina) River Plate
4	DF	Arnaldo Espínola	5 March 1975 (aged 22)			(Paraguay) Sportivo Luqueño
5	DF	Carlos Gamarra	17 February 1971 (aged 26)			(Brazil) Internacional
6	MF	Estanislao Struway	25 June 1968 (aged 28)			(Brazil) Portuguesa
7	MF	Hugo Ovelar	21 February 1971 (aged 26)			(Paraguay) Guaraní
8	FW	Hugo Brizuela	8 February 1969 (aged 28)			(Chile) Audax Italiano
9	FW	José Cardozo	19 March 1971 (aged 26)			(Mexico) Toluca
10	MF	Roberto Acuña	25 March 1972 (aged 25)			(Argentina) Independiente
11	DF	Juan Ramón Jara	6 August 1970 (aged 26)			(Argentina) Rosario Central
12	MF	Gustavo Sotelo	16 March 1968 (aged 29)			(Paraguay) Guaraní
13	DF	Jorge Alcaraz	4 July 1968 (aged 28)			(Paraguay) Cerro Porteño
14	DF	Ricardo Rojas	26 January 1971 (aged 26)			(Argentina) Estudiantes
15	DF	Pedro Sarabia	5 July 1975 (aged 21)			(Argentina) Banfield
16	DF	Juan Carlos Villamayor	5 March 1969 (aged 28)			(Paraguay) Cerro Porteño
17	MF	Harles Bourdier	14 August 1972 (aged 24)			(Paraguay) Olimpia
18	FW	Arístides Rojas	1 August 1970 (aged 26)			(Spain) Las Palmas
19	MF	Richard Gómez	19 August 1972 (aged 24)			(Paraguay) Cerro Porteño
20	FW	Derlis Soto	4 March 1973 (aged 24)			(Paraguay) Guaraní
21	FW	Francisco Esteche	12 November 1973 (aged 23)			(Paraguay) Olimpia
22	GK	Rubén Ruiz Díaz	11 November 1969 (aged 27)			(Mexico) Monterrey

== Group B ==
=== Bolivia ===
Head coach: (Spain) Antonio López

No.	Pos.	Player	Date of birth (age)	Caps	Goals	Club
1	GK	Carlos Trucco	8 August 1957 (aged 39)			(Mexico) Cruz Azul
2	DF	Juan Manuel Peña	17 January 1973 (aged 24)			(Spain) Real Valladolid
3	DF	Marco Sandy	29 August 1971 (aged 25)			(Bolivia) Bolívar
4	DF	Miguel Rimba	1 November 1967 (aged 29)			(Bolivia) Bolívar
5	DF	Óscar Sánchez	16 July 1971 (aged 25)			(Bolivia) The Strongest
6	MF	Vladimir Soria	15 July 1964 (aged 32)			(Bolivia) Bolívar
7	MF	Sergio Castillo	26 September 1970 (aged 26)			(Bolivia) The Strongest
8	MF	José Milton Melgar (c)	20 September 1959 (aged 37)			(Bolivia) Blooming
9	FW	Jaime Moreno	19 January 1974 (aged 23)			(United States) D.C. United
10	MF	Marco Etcheverry	26 September 1970 (aged 26)			(United States) D.C. United
11	MF	Limberg Gutiérrez	19 November 1977 (aged 19)			(Bolivia) Blooming
12	GK	Mauricio Soria	1 June 1966 (aged 31)			(Bolivia) Jorge Wilstermann
13	DF	Eduardo Jiguchi	24 August 1970 (aged 26)			(Bolivia) Bolívar
14	MF	Rubén Tufiño	9 January 1970 (aged 27)			(Bolivia) Blooming
15	MF	Mauro Blanco	25 November 1965 (aged 31)			(Bolivia) The Strongest
16	MF	Luis Cristaldo	31 August 1969 (aged 27)			(Bolivia) Bolívar
17	FW	Limberg Méndez	18 September 1973 (aged 23)			(Bolivia) Guabirá
18	FW	Milton Coimbra	4 May 1975 (aged 22)			(Argentina) Lanús
19	DF	Iván Castillo	11 July 1970 (aged 26)			(Bolivia) Bolívar
20	MF	Ramiro Castillo	27 March 1966 (aged 31)			(Bolivia) Bolívar
21	MF	Erwin Sánchez	19 October 1969 (aged 27)			(Portugal) Boavista
22	MF	Julio César Baldivieso	2 December 1971 (aged 25)			(Japan) Yokohama Marinos

=== Peru ===
Head coach: Freddy Ternero

No.	Pos.	Player	Date of birth (age)	Caps	Goals	Club
1	GK	Miguel Miranda	13 August 1966 (aged 30)			(Peru) Deportivo Municipal
2	DF	José Reyna	19 January 1972 (aged 25)			(Peru) Alianza Lima
3	DF	Miguel Rebosio	20 October 1976 (aged 20)			(Peru) Sporting Cristal
4	DF	Giuliano Portilla	25 May 1972 (aged 25)			(Peru) Universitario de Deportes
5	DF	Alfonso Dulanto (c)	22 July 1969 (aged 27)			(Mexico) Pumas
6	MF	Erick Torres	16 May 1975 (aged 22)			(Peru) Sporting Cristal
7	DF	Germán Muñoz	23 June 1973 (aged 23)			(Peru) Cienciano
8	MF	César Rosales	9 November 1970 (aged 26)			(Peru) Alianza Lima
9	FW	Paul Cominges	30 September 1979 (aged 17)			(Peru) Melgar
10	MF	Roberto Palacios	28 December 1972 (aged 24)			(Mexico) Puebla
11	MF	Alex Magallanes	1 March 1974 (aged 23)			(Peru) Sporting Cristal
12	GK	Juan Ángel Flores	25 February 1976 (aged 21)			(Peru) Sport Boys
13	DF	Orlando Prado	16 February 1972 (aged 25)			(Peru) Deportivo Pesquero
14	DF	Martín Hidalgo	15 June 1976 (aged 20)			(Peru) Sporting Cristal
15	MF	Aldo Cavero	24 October 1971 (aged 25)			(Peru) Cienciano
16	DF	José Luis Chacón	6 November 1971 (aged 25)			(Peru) Deportivo Pesquero
17	MF	Eddy Carazas	27 February 1974 (aged 23)			(Peru) Universitario de Deportes
18	FW	Waldir Sáenz	15 May 1973 (aged 24)			(Peru) Alianza Lima
19	MF	Marko Ciurlizza	22 February 1978 (aged 19)			(Peru) Universitario de Deportes
20	MF	Frank Palomino	1 December 1970 (aged 26)			(Peru) Melgar
21	GK	Leao Butrón	6 March 1977 (aged 20)			(Peru) Sporting Cristal
22	MF	Leonardo Uehara	8 June 1974 (aged 23)			(Peru) La Loretana

=== Uruguay ===
Head coach: Juan Ahuntchaín

No.	Pos.	Player	Date of birth (age)	Caps	Goals	Club
1	GK	Robert Siboldi	24 September 1965 (aged 31)			(Mexico) Tigres UANL
2	DF	Héctor Rodríguez	22 October 1968 (aged 28)			(Argentina) Colón
3	DF	Eber Moas (c)	21 March 1969 (aged 28)			(Mexico) Monterrey
4	MF	Leonardo Ramos	11 September 1969 (aged 27)			(Argentina) Estudiantes
5	MF	Gonzalo de los Santos	19 July 1976 (aged 20)			(Uruguay) Peñarol
6	DF	Tony Gómez	23 September 1966 (aged 30)			(Uruguay) Nacional
7	MF	Nelson Abeijón	21 July 1973 (aged 23)			(Uruguay) Nacional
8	MF	Marcelo Saralegui	18 May 1971 (aged 26)			(Argentina) Colón
9	FW	Luis Alberto Romero	15 June 1968 (aged 28)			(Uruguay) Peñarol
10	FW	Álvaro Recoba	17 March 1976 (aged 21)			(Uruguay) Nacional
11	MF	Javier Delgado	8 July 1975 (aged 21)			(Uruguay) Danubio
12	GK	Leonardo Romay	29 April 1969 (aged 28)			(Uruguay) Defensor Sporting
14	MF	Marcelo Romero	4 July 1976 (aged 20)			(Uruguay) Peñarol
15	DF	Tabaré Silva	30 August 1974 (aged 22)			(Uruguay) Defensor Sporting
16	FW	Josemir Lujambio	25 September 1971 (aged 25)			(Argentina) Huracán Corrientes
17	MF	Sergio Martínez	15 February 1969 (aged 28)			(Argentina) Boca Juniors
18	FW	Rubén da Silva	11 April 1968 (aged 29)			(Argentina) Rosario Central
19	DF	Yari Silvera	20 February 1976 (aged 21)			(Uruguay) River Plate
20	MF	Andrés Fleurquin	2 August 1975 (aged 21)			(Uruguay) Defensor Sporting
21	DF	Pablo Hernández	2 May 1975 (aged 22)			(Uruguay) Defensor Sporting
22	FW	Sebastián Abreu	17 October 1976 (aged 20)			(Argentina) San Lorenzo

=== Venezuela ===
Head coach: (Colombia) Eduardo Borrero

No.	Pos.	Player	Date of birth (age)	Caps	Goals	Club
1	GK	Rafael Dudamel (c)	7 January 1973 (aged 24)			(Colombia) Independiente Santa Fe
2	DF	David McIntosh	17 February 1973 (aged 24)			(Venezuela) Minervén
3	DF	Alexander Echenique	11 November 1971 (aged 25)			(Venezuela) Deportivo Táchira
4	DF	José Manuel Rey	20 May 1975 (aged 22)			(Venezuela) Caracas
5	MF	Luis Vallenilla	13 May 1974 (aged 23)			(Venezuela) Trujillanos
6	DF	Leonardo González	14 July 1972 (aged 24)			(Venezuela) Caracas
7	MF	Juan Carlos Socorro	13 May 1972 (aged 25)			(Spain) Las Palmas
8	MF	Gerson Díaz	11 February 1972 (aged 25)			(Venezuela) Caracas
9	FW	Rafael Castellín	2 September 1975 (aged 21)			(Venezuela) Caracas
10	MF	Gabriel Miranda	20 August 1968 (aged 28)			(Venezuela) Caracas
11	MF	Gabriel Urdaneta	7 January 1976 (aged 21)			(Venezuela) Atletico Zulia
12	GK	César Baena	13 January 1961 (aged 36)			(Venezuela) Caracas
13	MF	Jesús Rodríguez	24 March 1968 (aged 29)			(Venezuela) Estudiantes de Mérida
14	DF	William González	27 December 1969 (aged 27)			(Venezuela) Mineros
15	FW	Jesús Valiente	28 August 1973 (aged 23)			(Venezuela) Trujillanos
16	FW	Oswaldo Palencia	1 February 1970 (aged 27)			(Venezuela) ULA Mérida
17	DF	Elvis Martínez	4 October 1970 (aged 26)			(Venezuela) Caracas
18	DF	Andrew Páez	28 December 1968 (aged 28)			(Venezuela) Mineros
19	MF	Luis Ramos	18 February 1966 (aged 31)			(Venezuela) Atletico Zulia
20	DF	Robert Rodallega	19 November 1969 (aged 27)			(Venezuela) Minervén
21	FW	John Medina	9 September 1968 (aged 28)			(Venezuela) Atletico Zulia
22	GK	César Espinoza	9 August 1974 (aged 23)			(Venezuela) Estudiantes de Mérida

== Group C ==
=== Brazil ===
Head coach: Mário Zagallo

No.	Pos.	Player	Date of birth (age)	Caps	Goals	Club
1	GK	Cláudio Taffarel	8 May 1966 (aged 31)			(Brazil) Atlético Mineiro
2	DF	Cafu	7 June 1970 (aged 27)			(Brazil) Palmeiras
3	DF	Aldair	30 November 1965 (aged 31)			(Italy) Roma
4	DF	Márcio Santos	15 September 1969 (aged 27)			(Brazil) Atlético Mineiro
5	MF	Mauro Silva	12 January 1968 (aged 29)			(Spain) Deportivo de La Coruña
6	DF	Roberto Carlos	10 April 1973 (aged 24)			(Spain) Real Madrid
7	MF	Giovanni	4 February 1972 (aged 25)			(Spain) Barcelona
8	MF	Dunga (c)	31 October 1963 (aged 33)			(Japan) Júbilo Iwata
9	FW	Ronaldo	22 September 1976 (aged 20)			(Spain) Barcelona
10	MF	Leonardo	5 September 1969 (aged 27)			(France) Paris Saint-Germain
11	FW	Romário	29 January 1966 (aged 31)			(Brazil) Flamengo
12	GK	Carlos Germano	14 August 1970 (aged 26)			(Brazil) Vasco da Gama
13	MF	Djalminha	9 December 1970 (aged 26)			(Brazil) Palmeiras
14	DF	Zé Maria	25 July 1973 (aged 23)			(Italy) Parma
15	DF	Célio Silva	20 May 1968 (aged 29)			(Brazil) Corinthians
16	DF	Marcelo Gonçalves	22 February 1966 (aged 31)			(Brazil) Botafogo
17	DF	Zé Roberto	6 July 1974 (aged 22)			(Spain) Real Madrid
18	MF	César Sampaio	31 March 1968 (aged 29)			(Japan) Yokohama Flügels
19	MF	Flávio Conceição	12 June 1974 (aged 22)			(Spain) Deportivo de La Coruña
20	FW	Denílson	24 August 1977 (aged 19)			(Brazil) São Paulo
21	FW	Edmundo	2 April 1971 (aged 26)			(Brazil) Vasco da Gama
22	FW	Paulo Nunes	30 October 1971 (aged 25)			(Brazil) Grêmio

=== Colombia ===
Head coach: Hernán Darío Gómez

No.	Pos.	Player	Date of birth (age)	Caps	Goals	Club
1	GK	Faryd Mondragón	21 June 1971 (aged 25)			(Argentina) Independiente
2	DF	Iván Córdoba	11 August 1976 (aged 20)			(Colombia) Atlético Nacional
3	DF	Carlos Asprilla	19 October 1970 (aged 26)			(Colombia) América de Cali
4	DF	José Santa	12 September 1970 (aged 26)			(Colombia) Atlético Nacional
5	DF	Jorge Bermúdez (c)	18 June 1971 (aged 25)			(Portugal) Benfica
6	MF	John Wilmar Pérez	2 February 1970 (aged 27)			(Colombia) Deportivo Cali
7	FW	Luis Zuleta	7 August 1974 (aged 22)			(Colombia) Unión Magdalena
8	MF	Andrés Estrada	12 November 1967 (aged 29)			(Colombia) Deportivo Cali
9	FW	Víctor Aristizábal	9 December 1971 (aged 25)			(Brazil) São Paulo
10	MF	Edison Mafla	14 August 1971 (aged 25)			(Colombia) Deportivo Cali
11	FW	Faustino Asprilla	10 November 1969 (aged 27)			(England) Newcastle
12	GK	Miguel Calero	14 April 1971 (aged 26)			(Colombia) Deportivo Cali
13	DF	Wilmer Cabrera	15 September 1967 (aged 29)			(Colombia) América de Cali
14	MF	Hernán Gaviria	27 November 1969 (aged 27)			(Colombia) Atlético Nacional
15	MF	Francisco Mosquera	5 November 1973 (aged 23)			(Colombia) Atlético Nacional
16	DF	Luis Antonio Moreno	25 December 1970 (aged 26)			(Colombia) Deportes Tolima
17	FW	Hámilton Ricard	1 January 1974 (aged 23)			(Colombia) Deportivo Cali
18	FW	Víctor Bonilla	23 January 1971 (aged 26)			(Colombia) Deportivo Cali
19	FW	Walter Escobar	26 September 1968 (aged 28)			(Colombia) Deportivo Cali
20	MF	Víctor Pacheco	24 September 1974 (aged 22)			(Colombia) Atlético Junior
21	MF	Martín Zapata	28 October 1970 (aged 26)			(Colombia) Deportivo Cali
22	MF	Neider Morantes	3 August 1975 (aged 21)			(Colombia) Atlético Nacional

=== Costa Rica ===
Head coach: (Argentina) Horacio Cordero

No.	Pos.	Player	Date of birth (age)	Caps	Club
1	GK	Erick Lonnis	9 September 1965 (aged 31)		(Costa Rica) Saprissa
2	DF	Harold Wallace	7 September 1975 (aged 21)		(Costa Rica) Alajuelense
3	DF	Luis Marín	10 August 1974 (aged 22)		(Costa Rica) Alajuelense
4	DF	Rónald González (c)	8 August 1970 (aged 26)		(Costa Rica) Saprissa
5	MF	Joaquín Guillén	12 January 1968 (aged 29)		(Costa Rica) Alajuelense
6	MF	Wílmer López	3 August 1971 (aged 25)		(Costa Rica) Alajuelense
7	FW	Allan Oviedo	8 November 1970 (aged 26)		(Costa Rica) Herediano
8	DF	Mauricio Solís	13 December 1972 (aged 24)		(England) Derby County
9	MF	Roy Myers	13 April 1969 (aged 28)		(Mexico) Pachuca
10	FW	Rolando Fonseca	6 June 1974 (aged 23)		(Colombia) América de Cali
11	MF	Jafet Soto	1 April 1976 (aged 21)		(Mexico) Atlético Morelia
12	MF	Oscar Ramírez	8 December 1964 (aged 32)		(Costa Rica) Belén
13	DF	Javier Delgado	28 July 1968 (aged 28)		(Costa Rica) Alajuelense
14	DF	Sandro Alfaro	1 January 1971 (aged 26)		(Costa Rica) Herediano
15	MF	Walter Centeno	6 October 1974 (aged 22)		(Costa Rica) Saprissa
16	FW	Rónald Gómez	24 January 1975 (aged 22)		(Spain) Sporting de Gijón
17	FW	Hernán Medford	23 May 1968 (aged 29)		(Mexico) Pachuca
18	MF	Austin Berry	5 April 1971 (aged 26)		(Costa Rica) Alajuelense
19	DF	Mauricio Wright	20 December 1970 (aged 26)		(Costa Rica) Saprissa
20	DF	Geovanny Jara	20 July 1967 (aged 29)		(Costa Rica) Herediano
22	GK	Hermidio Barrantes	2 September 1964 (aged 32)		(Costa Rica) Cartaginés

=== Mexico ===
Head coach: (Federal Republic of Yugoslavia) Bora Milutinović

No.	Pos.	Player	Date of birth (age)	Caps	Goals	Club
1	GK	Adolfo Ríos	11 December 1966 (aged 30)			(Mexico) Veracruz
2	DF	Claudio Suárez (c)	17 December 1968 (aged 28)			(Mexico) Guadalajara
3	DF	Joel Sánchez	17 August 1974 (aged 22)			(Mexico) Guadalajara
4	MF	Germán Villa	2 April 1973 (aged 24)			(Mexico) América
5	DF	Duilio Davino	21 March 1976 (aged 21)			(Mexico) Tecos UAG
6	MF	Raúl Lara	28 February 1973 (aged 24)			(Mexico) América
7	MF	Rafael García	14 August 1974 (aged 22)			(Mexico) Pumas
8	MF	Nicolas Ramirez	16 February 1974 (aged 23)			(Mexico) Santos Laguna
9	MF	Paulo Chávez	7 January 1976 (aged 21)			(Mexico) Guadalajara
10	FW	Eustacio Rizo	30 September 1971 (aged 25)			(Mexico) Tecos UAG
11	FW	Cuauhtémoc Blanco	17 January 1973 (aged 24)			(Mexico) América
12	GK	Hugo Pineda	10 May 1962 (aged 35)			(Mexico) América
13	MF	Pável Pardo	26 July 1976 (aged 20)			(Mexico) Atlas
14	MF	Camilo Romero	30 March 1970 (aged 27)			(Mexico) Guadalajara
15	FW	Luis Hernández	17 August 1968 (aged 28)			(Mexico) Necaxa
16	DF	Gilberto Jiménez	4 February 1973 (aged 24)			(Mexico) Puebla
17	FW	Francisco Palencia	28 April 1973 (aged 24)			(Mexico) Cruz Azul
18	MF	Javier Saavedra	13 March 1974 (aged 23)			(Mexico) Toros Neza
19	DF	Francisco Gabriel de Anda	5 June 1971 (aged 26)			(Mexico) Santos Laguna
20	FW	José Manuel Abundis	11 June 1973 (aged 24)			(Mexico) Toluca
21	MF	Antonio Sancho	14 March 1976 (aged 21)			(Mexico) Pumas
22	GK	Martín Zúñiga	6 August 1970 (aged 26)			(Mexico) Guadalajara
