= 2000 FBC Melgar season =

FBC Melgar
2000 season
- Stadium: Estadio Melgar
- Torneo Descentralizado: Torneo Apertura: Third (3°); Torneo Clausura: Fourth (4°); Aggregate Table: Fourth (4°); Fifth National (5°)
Home colours	Away colours	Third colours

The 2000 FBC Melgar season were the Eighty-Sixth (86.º) of the club from its foundation in 1915, Thirty-One (31) participations in the top-flight of Peruvian Primera División (of 84 Editions) with denomination Torneo Descentralizado. In Previous Season the club qualified as 4th Place of the 1999 Torneo Descentralizado.

Melgar were a of twelve (12) clubs in the Thirty-Fifth edition (35.º) Torneo Descentralizado, the competition most important of the Peruvian football. The club played the Peruvian Primera División.

In early 2000 (February 1, 2000), A club relocated from Chimbote to the City Huancayo seeking the support of the local population, It changed of name from Club Deportivo Pesquero to Deportivo Pesquero-Wanka, and finally to Club Deportivo Wanka.

== Torneo Descentralizado ==
The Descentralizado was played in three stages: in the First Stage, the teams played in a Round-robin Format, with home and away matches (Torneo Apertura) totaling Twenty-Two (22) matches each; in the Second Stage they followed the same format (Torneo Clausura). In the Third Stage, following of Aggregated Table, the champions of Torneo Apertura and Clausura, they play in the National Final (played over two legs) to determine that year's National Champion, with both teams qualifying for the 2001 Copa Libertadores.

Meanwhile, the team with the second-worst acumulative points total (11th place) will play a Play-offs Relegated match (a single game) against the 2000 Second Division champion. Where the winner earns promotion to the 2001 First Division. And the team with the lowest acumulative score (12th place) will be relegated to the 2001 Second Division (if is a team from Lima or Callao) and/or to the 2001 Copa Perú (if is a team from other departments).

== Teams participants ==
Club	City	Foundation	Comes from	Stadium	Capacity	Grass
Alianza Lima	Lima	February 15, 1901	2° (SC) 1999 Torneo Descentralizado	Alejandro Villanueva	35.000	Natural
Cienciano	Cusco	July 8, 1901	6° 1999 Torneo Descentralizado	Inca Garcilaso de la Vega	42.056	Natural
FBC Melgar	Arequipa	March 25, 1915; 111 years ago	4° 1999 Torneo Descentralizado	Mariano Melgar	15.000	Natural
Alianza Atlético	Sullana	January 18, 1920	8° 1999 Torneo Descentralizado	Campeones del 36	8.000	Natural
Juan Aurich	Chiclayo	September 3, 1922	9° 1999 Torneo Descentralizado	Elías Aguirre	23.500	Natural
Universitario de Deportes	Lima	August 7, 1924	1° (C) 1999 Torneo Descentralizado	Lolo Fernández	4.000	Natural
Sport Boys	Callao	July 28, 1927	5° 1999 Torneo Descentralizado	Miguel Grau	43.000	Natural
Deportivo Municipal	Lima	July 27, 1935	10° 1999 Torneo Descentralizado	Municipal de Chorrillos	15.000	Natural
Sporting Cristal	Lima	December 13, 1955	3° 1999 Torneo Descentralizado	San Martín de Porres	11.500	Natural
Deportivo Pesquero-Wanka	Huancayo	October 26, 1969	11° 1999 Torneo Descentralizado	Manuel Gómez Arellano	15.000	Natural
Unión Minas	Cerro de Pasco	April 23, 1974	7° 1999 Torneo Descentralizado	Daniel Alcides Carrión	12.000	Natural
Deportivo UPAO	Trujillo	August 30, 1995	Champion 1999 Copa Perú	Estadio Mansiche	25.036	Natural

=== Stadia locations ===
Department	City	Club
Lima	Lima	Alianza Lima; Sporting Cristal; Universitario; Deportivo Municipal
Lima	Callao	Sport Boys
Piura	Sullana	Alianza Atlético
Lambayeque	Chiclayo	Juan Aurich
La Libertad	Trujillo	Deportivo UPAO
Junín	Huancayo	Deportivo Pesquero-Wanka
Pasco	Cerro de Pasco	Unión Minas
Cusco	Cusco	Cienciano
Arequipa	Arequipa	FBC Melgar

Locations of the 2000 Primera División teams

== Torneo Apertura ==
Is the First Stage, the teams played in a Round-robin Format, with home and away matches (Torneo Apertura) totaling Twenty-Two (22) matches each. At the finalized of the 22 matchdays, the team in First Place (1°) is Champion of the Torneo Apertura, this team then faces the Champion of the Torneo Clausura in the National Final to determine the national champion. Both teams qualify for the 2001 Copa Libertadores. The matches of the Torneo Apertura were played from February 5 to July 9.

=== Results Torneo Apertura ===
Home \ Away	AAS	ALI	CIE	DMU	UPA	DPW	JAU	MEL	SBA	SCR	UMI	UNI
Alianza Atlético		1–0	3–2	6–2	3–1	1–1	0–1	0–0	2–1	1–1	2–1	2–3
Alianza Lima	0–1		3–1	2–0	2–1	2–2	3–1	1–1	1–0	0–0	2–0	0–2
Cienciano	2–1	0–0		3–3	2–1	2–0	1–0	1–2	1–1	2–2	1–0	2–1
Deportivo Municipal	1–1	1–1	0–1		2–0	3–1	1–1	1–4	0–0	0–4	2–2	1–5
Deportivo UPAO	1–0	1–1	0–1	4–2		1–1	1–1	2–1	1–4	1–0	0–2	0–0
Deportivo Pesquero-Wanka	1–2	0–1	1–3	1–0	1–0		1–0	4–2	0–1	3–1	1–1	1–0
Juan Aurich	0–0	2–2	2–2	1–0	1–1	1–1		3–2	0–2	3–3	1–1	1–2
FBC Melgar	2–0	2–0	0–0	3–2	0–0	3–0	3–0		4–0	3–1	1–0	0–0
Sport Boys	1–1	4–0	2–3	3–1	3–3	3–1	1–0	4–2		1–0	1–0	1–1
Sporting Cristal	3–1	0–1	4–0	2–1	8–3	3–0	1–1	0–0	0–1		3–0	3–3
Unión Minas	2–0	0–1	2–0	1–0	2–1	2–0	1–0	4–2	2–0	4–1		1–2
Universitario	1–0	2–0	2–1	2–1	2–1	0–0	1–1	4–2	2–2	2–0	2–0	

Updated to match(es) played on August 2000. Source: ADFP - official fixture
Legend: Blue = home team win; Yellow = draw; Red = away team win.

=== Matches Torneo Apertura ===
February 6, 2000 Match 1	FBC Melgar	0–0	Universitario	Arequipa
15:30 UTC−5				Stadium: Estadio Melgar; Attendance: 13,916; Referee: Ángel Ziani

February 13, 2000 Match 2	Juan Aurich	3–2 (3-0)	FBC Melgar	Chiclayo
	Willy Soto 12' 35'; Martín Reyes 44'		Jorge Reyes 67'; Ernesto Zapata 72' (pen.)	Stadium: Estadio Elías Aguirre

February 19, 2000 Match 3	FBC Melgar	3–0 (0-0)	Deportivo Pesquero-Wanka	Arequipa
	Jorge Reyes 74' 81'; Alexis Aguirre 51'			Stadium: Estadio Melgar

February 26, 2000 Match 4	Deportivo Municipal	1–4 (1-1)	FBC Melgar	Lima
	Carlos Guido 30'		Alfredo Carmona 3' (pen.) 67'; Aldo Cavero 62'; Luis Bello 84'	Stadium: Estadio Municipal de Chorrillos

March 5, 2000 Match 5	Unión Minas	4–2 (2-1)	FBC Melgar	Cerro de Pasco
	Rodolfo Miñán 13'; Israel Hidalgo 15'; Nelson Gómez 52' 83'		Alfonso Dulanto 31'; Luis Bello 70'	Stadium: Estadio Daniel Alcides Carrión

March 11, 2000 Match 6	FBC Melgar	3–1 (2-0)	Sporting Cristal	Arequipa
	Aldo Cavero 27'; Luis Bello 39' 79'		Roberto Holsen 71'	Stadium: Estadio Melgar

March 18, 2000 Match 7	Alianza Lima	1–1 (1-1)	FBC Melgar	Lima
	Henry Quinteros 41'		Juan Carlos Bazalar 39'	Stadium: Estadio Alejandro Villanueva

March 26, 2000 Match 8	Cienciano	1–2 (1-1)	FBC Melgar	Cusco
	Pedro Prado 40'		Jorge Reyes 15'; Luis Bello 88'	Stadium: Estadio Inca Garcilaso de la Vega

April 2, 2000 Match 9	FBC Melgar	4–0 (2-0)	Sport Boys	Arequipa
	Aldo Cavero 18'; Luis Bello 41' 51'; Juan Carlos Bazalar 69'			Stadium: Estadio Melgar

April 7, 2000 Match 10	FBC Melgar	2–0 (1-0)	Alianza Atlético	Arequipa
	Luis Bello 34' 46'			Stadium: Estadio Melgar

April 16, 2000 Match 11	Deportivo UPAO	2–1 (0-1)	FBC Melgar	Trujillo
	Gabriel Rodríguez 67' 75' (pen.)		Valdimir Ambuila 23'	Stadium: Estadio Mansiche

April 23, 2000 Match 12	Universitario	4–2 (2-0)	FBC Melgar	Lima
	Piero Alva 32'; Carlos Yaqué 36'; Eduardo Esidio 74' 90'		Aldo Cavero 52'; Jorge Reyes 85'	Stadium: Estadio Nacional

April 29, 2000 Match 13	FBC Melgar	3–0 (3-0)	Juan Aurich	Arequipa
	Luis Bello 1' 43'; Aldo Cavero 23'			Stadium: Estadio Melgar; Referee: Ángel Ziani

May 7, 2000 Match 14	Deportivo Pesquero-Wanka	4–2 (2-1)	FBC Melgar	Chimbote
	Rodrigo Gauna 28' 69'; Danny Chumpitaz 45'; Jahir Butrón 85'		Alfredo Carmona 9' 71'	Stadium: Estadio Manuel Gómez Arellano

May 13, 2000 Match 15	FBC Melgar	3–2 (1-2)	Deportivo Municipal	Arequipa
	Jorge Reyes 20'; Wálter Zevallos 52'; Alfredo Carmona 55' (pen.)		José Valle 35'; Anthony Matellini 39'	Stadium: Estadio Melgar

May 21, 2000 Match 16	FBC Melgar	1–0 (0-0)	Unión Minas	Arequipa
	Christian Zúñiga 86'			Stadium: Estadio Melgar

May 27, 2000 Match 17	Sporting Cristal	0–0	FBC Melgar	Lima
				Stadium: Estadio San Martín de Porres

June 11, 2000 Match 18	FBC Melgar	2–0 (0-0)	Alianza Lima	Arequipa
	Aldo Cavero 50'; Christian Zúñiga 68'			Stadium: Estadio Melgar

June 17, 2000 Match 19	FBC Melgar	0-0	Cienciano	Arequipa
				Stadium: Estadio Melgar

June 24, 2000 Match 20	Sport Boys	4–2 (2-0)	FBC Melgar	Callao
	James Angulo 30' 62' 82'; Carlos Lobatón 35'		Alfredo Carmona 52'; Aldo Cavero 69'	Stadium: Estadio Miguel Grau

July 2, 2000 Match 21	Alianza Atlético	0–0	FBC Melgar	Sullana
				Stadium: Estadio Campeones del 36

July 9, 2000 Match 22	FBC Melgar	0-0	Deportivo UPAO	Arequipa
				Stadium: Estadio Melgar

=== Table Torneo Apertura ===
Pos	Team	Pld	W	D	L	GF	GA	GD	Pts	Qualification
1	Universitario	22	13	7	2	39	20	+19	46	Copa Libertadores 2001 First stage
2	Sport Boys	22	11	6	5	36	25	+11	39	Copa Libertadores 2001 First stage
3	FBC Melgar	22	10	6	6	39	27	+12	36	
4	Cienciano	22	10	6	6	31	30	+1	36	
5	Alianza Lima	22	9	7	6	23	22	+1	34	
6	Unión Minas	22	10	3	9	28	23	+5	33	
7	Alianza Atlético	22	8	6	8	28	27	+1	30	
8	Sporting Cristal	22	7	7	8	40	31	+9	28	
9	Pesquero-Wanka	22	6	6	10	21	32	−11	24	
10	Juan Aurich	22	3	11	8	21	30	−9	20	
11	Deportivo UPAO	22	4	7	11	24	39	−15	19	
12	Deportivo Municipal	22	2	6	14	24	48	−24	12	

Updated to match(es) played on July 2000. Source: https://www.rsssf.org/tablesp/peru00.html
Rules for classification: 1) points; 2) goal difference; 3) number of goals scored.

== Torneo Clausura ==
Is the Second Stage, the teams played in a Round-robin Format, with home and away matches (Torneo Clausura) totaling Twenty-Two (22) matches each. At the finalized of the 22 matchdays, the team in First Place (1°) is Champion of the Torneo Clausura, this team then faces the Champion of the Torneo Apertura in the National Final to determine the national champion. Both teams qualify for the 2001 Copa Libertadores. The matches of the Torneo Apertura were played from July 23 to December 8.

=== Results Torneo Clausura ===
Home \ Away	AAS	ALI	CIE	DMU	UPA	DWA	JAU	MEL	SBA	SCR	UMI	UNI
Alianza Atlético		3–2	4–1	3–2	1–2	2–0	2–1	0–0	2–1	1–2	4–0	1–1
Alianza Lima	2–1		2–1	0–0	1–1	3–0	1–1	4–1	0–0	1–2	4–0	0–1
Cienciano	5–0	2–0		4–0	2–0	4–2	7–1	5–2	1–1	3–1	0–1	2–3
Deportivo Municipal	1–1	2–3	1–1		1–0	5–4	1–3	1–0	0–0	0–4	3–3	1–2
Deportivo UPAO	2–4	1–5	0–2	0–0		3–1	1–1	0–2	0–3	2–4	3–2	2–3
Deportivo Wanka	2–0	3–2	2–0	4–1	2–0		4–0	1–0	2–0	1–1	0–0	0–0
Juan Aurich	1–5	1–1	0–0	3–2	0–1	1–1		1–0	0–1	0–7	4–2	1–2
FBC Melgar	3–1	2–0	1–1	1–0	2–1	4–0	2–1		2–1	1–2	1–2	2–0
Sport Boys	0–0	2–2	1–2	0–0	4–0	2–0	2–1	1–3		0–1	2–0	0–2
Sporting Cristal	1–1	1–1	3–2	3–2	1–0	1–0	1–0	1–1	2–1		4–2	2–2
Unión Minas	3–0	4–1	1–1	1–0	4–0	0–1	3–1	2–1	2–2	1–2		2–1
Universitario	2–0	4–1	2–1	3–1	5–0	6–2	5–0	3–2	3–1	3–2	2–0	

Updated to match(es) played on December 2000. Source: ADFP - official fixture
RSSSF Peru 2000
Legend: Blue = home team win; Yellow = draw; Red = away team win.

=== Matches Torneo Clausura ===
July 23, 2000 Match 1	FBC Melgar	2–0 (0-0)	Universitario	Arequipa
	Paulo César Cruvinel 42'; Germán Carty 72'			Stadium: Estadio Monumental Virgen de Chapi; Referee: Martín Cabrera

July 30, 2000 Match 2	Juan Aurich	1–0 (0-0)	FBC Melgar	Chiclayo
	Jesús Reyes 79'			Stadium: Estadio Elías Aguirre

August 6, 2000 Match 3	FBC Melgar	4–0 (1-0)	Deportivo Wanka	Arequipa
	Francisco López 24'; Marco Valencia 59'; Luis Bello 76'; Paulo César Cruvinel 86'			Stadium: Estadio Melgar

August 13, 2000 Match 4	Deportivo Municipal	1–0 (1-0)	FBC Melgar	Lima
	Edward Mafla 14'			Stadium: Estadio Municipal de Chorrillos

August 20, 2000 Match 5	Unión Minas	2–1 (1-0)	FBC Melgar	Cerro de Pasco
	Nelson Gómez 29'; Sergio Godoy 75'		Gerson Paz 88'	Stadium: Estadio Daniel Alcides Carrión

August 27, 2000 Match 6	FBC Melgar	1–2 (0-2)	Sporting Cristal	Arequipa
	Leonardo Uehara 78' (pen.)		Roberto Silva 39'; Palhinha 42'	Stadium: Estadio Melgar

September 2, 2000 Match 7	Alianza Lima	4–1 (1-0)	FBC Melgar	Lima
	Roberto Holsen 17' (pen.) 89'; Jackson 62'; David Chévez 68'		Paulo César Cruvinel 81'	Stadium: Estadio Alejandro Villanueva

September 10, 2000 Match 8	Cienciano	5–2 (1-0)	FBC Melgar	Cusco
	Luis Alberto Bonnet 1' 45' 46' 55' 62'		Paulo César Cruvinel 50' (pen.) 90' (pen.)	Stadium: Estadio Inca Garcilaso de la Vega

September 17, 2000 Match 9	FBC Melgar	2–1 (0-1)	Sport Boys	Arequipa
	Francisco López 68'; Jorge Reyes 77'		Alonso Alcíbar 37'	Stadium: Estadio Melgar

September 24, 2000 Match 10	FBC Melgar	3–1 (1-1)	Alianza Atlético	Arequipa
	Alfonso Dulanto 37'; Alfredo Carmona 53'; Juan Carlos Bazalar 90'		Carlos Zegarra 36'	Stadium: Estadio Melgar

October 1, 2000 Match 11	Deportivo UPAO	0–2 (0-0)	FBC Melgar	Trujillo
			Gerson Paz 53' 60'	Stadium: Estadio Mansiche

October 10, 2000 Match 12	Universitario	3–2 (2-0)	FBC Melgar	Lima
	Edson Domínguez 11'; Eduardo Esidio 22' 80'		Paulo César Cruvinel 69'; Luis Bello 88'	Stadium: Estadio Monumental; Referee: José Arana

October 17, 2000 Match 13	FBC Melgar	2–1 (1-0)	Juan Aurich	Arequipa
	Paulo César Cruvinel 40' 51'		Luis Flores 58'	Stadium: Estadio Melgar

October 22, 2000 Match 14	Deportivo Wanka	1–0 (0-0)	FBC Melgar	Chimbote
	Miguel Ortega 51'			Stadium: Estadio Manuel Gómez Arellano

October 28, 2000 Match 15	FBC Melgar	1–0 (0-0)	Deportivo Municipal	Arequipa
	Gerson Paz 50'			Stadium: Estadio Melgar

November 1, 2000 Match 16	FBC Melgar	1–2 (1-0)	Unión Minas	Arequipa
15:00	Marco Valencia 9'		Rodolfo Miñán 50'; Roberto Barquero 87'	Stadium: Estadio Melgar

November 5, 2000 Match 17	Sporting Cristal	1–1 (1-0)	FBC Melgar	Lima
11:30	Roberto Silva 30'		Paulo César Cruvinel 79'	Stadium: Estadio San Martín de Porres

November 12, 2000 Match 18	FBC Melgar	2–0 (1-0)	Alianza Lima	Arequipa
15:30	Alfonso Dulanto 7'; Gerson Paz 82'			Stadium: Estadio Monumental Virgen de Chapi

November 18, 2000 Match 19	FBC Melgar	1-1 (0-0)	Cienciano	Arequipa
	Paulo César Cruvinel 67'		Pedro Prado 56'	Stadium: Estadio Melgar

November 26, 2000 Match 20	Sport Boys	1–3 (0-1)	FBC Melgar	Callao
	Roberto Ruiz 89'		Marco Valencia 4'; Juan Carlos Bazalar 51'; Gerson Paz 65'	Stadium: Estadio Miguel Grau

December 2, 2000 Match 21	Alianza Atlético	0–0	FBC Melgar	Sullana
				Stadium: Estadio Campeones del 36

December 8, 2000 Match 22	FBC Melgar	2-1 (0-1)	Deportivo UPAO	Arequipa
	Leonardo Uehara 86'; Marco Valencia 90'		Juan Saavedra 29'	Stadium: Estadio Melgar

=== Table Torneo Clausura ===
Pos	Team	Pld	W	D	L	GF	GA	GD	Pts	Qualification
1	Universitario	22	17	3	2	55	23	+32	54	Copa Libertadores 2001 First stage
2	Sporting Cristal	22	15	5	2	48	24	+24	50	Copa Libertadores 2001 First stage
3	Cienciano	22	10	5	7	47	28	+19	35	
4	FBC Melgar	22	10	3	9	33	28	+5	33	
5	Alianza Atlético	22	9	5	8	36	24	+12	32	
6	Deportivo Wanka	22	9	5	8	36	34	+2	32	
7	Unión Minas	22	9	4	9	33	37	−4	31	
8	Alianza Lima	22	7	7	8	36	33	+3	28	
9	Sport Boys	22	6	7	9	25	25	0	25	
10	Juan Aurich	22	4	5	13	22	50	−28	17	
11	Deportivo Municipal	22	3	7	12	24	43	−19	16	
12	Deportivo UPAO	22	4	3	15	19	50	−31	15	

Updated to match(es) played on December 2000. Source: https://www.rsssf.org/tablesp/peru00.html
Rules for classification: 1) points; 2) goal difference; 3) number of goals scored.

== Aggregate table ==
Pos	Team	Pld	W	D	L	GF	GA	GD	Pts	Qualification or relegation
1	Universitario (C)	44	30	10	4	94	43	+51	100	2001 Copa Libertadores First stage and 2001 Copa Merconorte
2	Sporting Cristal	44	22	12	10	88	55	+33	78	2001 Copa Libertadores First stage and 2001 Copa Merconorte
3	Cienciano	44	20	11	13	78	58	+20	71	
4	FBC Melgar	44	20	9	15	72	55	+17	69	
5	Sport Boys	44	17	13	14	61	50	+11	64	2001 Copa Libertadores First stage
6	Unión Minas	44	19	7	18	61	60	+1	64	
7	Alianza Lima	44	16	14	14	59	55	+4	62	2001 Copa Merconorte
8	Alianza Atlético	44	17	11	16	64	61	+3	62	
9	Deportivo Wanka	44	15	11	18	53	67	−14	56	
10	Juan Aurich	44	7	16	21	43	80	−37	37	
11	Deportivo UPAO (O)	44	8	10	26	43	89	−46	34	Qualification for Promotion/relegation play-off
12	Deportivo Municipal (R)	44	5	13	26	48	91	−43	28	Relegation to 2001 Segunda División

Updated to match(es) played on December 2000. Source: https://www.rsssf.org/tablesp/peru00.html
Rules for classification: 1) points; 2) goal difference; 3) number of goals scored.
(C) Champions; (O) Play-off winners; (R) Relegated

== See also ==
- FBC Melgar
- 2000 Torneo Descentralizado

Preceded by Season 1999	Foot Ball Club Melgar 2000 Season	Succeeded by Season 2001
