= 1997 in Ecuadorian football =

Football in Ecuador
- Season: 1997

The 1997 season is the 75th season of competitive football in Ecuador.

== National leagues ==
=== Serie A ===
- Champion: Barcelona (13th title)
- International cup qualifiers:
  - 1998 Copa Libertadores: Barcelona, Deportivo Quito
  - 1998 Copa CONMEBOL: LDU Quito
- Relegated: Calvi, Deportivo Quevedo

=== Serie B ===
- Winner: Panamá (1st title)
- Promoted: Panamá, Delfín
- Relegated: 9 de Octubre, Esmeraldas Petrolero

=== Segunda ===
- Winner: Deportivo Quinindé
- Promoted: Deportivo Quinindé, Audaz Octubrino

== Clubs in international competitions ==
Team	1997 Copa Libertadores	1997 Copa CONMEBOL
El Nacional	Eliminated in the Round of 16	N/A
Emelec	Eliminated in the First Round	N/A
Técnico Universitario	N/A	Eliminated in the First Round

== National teams ==
=== Senior team ===
The Ecuador national team played nineteen matches in 1997: ten 1998 FIFA World Cup qualifiers, 4 at the 1997 Copa América, and five friendlies.

==== 1998 FIFA World Cup qualifiers ====
Qualification to the 1998 FIFA World Cup in France finished in 1997. Ecuador finished 6th in CONMEBOL and failed to qualify to the tournament.

12 January 1997

Bolivia	2 – 0	Ecuador
Moreno 7'; Etcheverry 12'

Estadio Hernando Siles, La Paz
Attendance: 39,968
Referee: Óscar Ruiz (Colombia)

17 February 1997

Ecuador	4 – 0	Uruguay
Aguinaga 6'; Delgado 69', 76'; Chalá 86'

Estadio Olímpico Atahualpa, Quito
Attendance: 18,000
Referee: Javier Castrilli (Argentina)

2 April 1997

Peru	1 – 1	Ecuador
Palacios 59'		Aguinaga 79' (pen.)

Estadio Nacional, Lima
Attendance: 42,299
Referee: John Toro Rendón (Colombia)

30 April 1997

Argentina	2 – 1	Ecuador
Ortega 13'; Crespo 28'		Aguinaga 67'

Estadio River Plate, Buenos Aires
Attendance: 62,300
Referee: Félix Benegas (Paraguay)

8 June 1997

Ecuador	1 – 1	Chile
Graziani 43'		Salas 53'

Estadio Olímpico Atahualpa, Quito
Attendance: 42,225
Referee: Benito Archundia (Mexico)

6 July 1997

Venezuela	1 – 1	Ecuador
Miranda 75'		Hurtado 55'

Estadio José Pachencho Romero, Maracaibo
Attendance: 4,729
Referee: Arturo Angeles (United States)

20 July 1997

Colombia	1 – 0	Ecuador
de Ávila 87'

Estadio Metropolitano, Barranquilla
Attendance: 35,000
Referee: Marcio Rezende (Brazil)

20 August 1997

Ecuador	2 – 1	Paraguay
Aguinaga 53'; Graziani 78'		Báez 5'

Estadio Olímpico Atahualpa, Quito
Attendance: 30,000
Referee: Rodrigo Badilla (Costa Rica)

12 October 1997

Ecuador	1 – 0	Bolivia
Graziani 26'

Estadio Monumental Isidro Romero Carbo, Guayaquil
Attendance: 14,568
Referee: Arturo Brizio Carter (Mexico)

16 November 1997

Uruguay	5 – 3	Ecuador
Saralegui 3', 12'; Abreu 48', 52'; Carlos Aguilera 63'		Graziani 2', 59', 68'

Estadio Domingo Burgueño, Maldonado
Attendance: 10,000
Referee: Antonio Marrufo (Mexico)

==== Copa América ====
The 1997 Copa América was held in Bolivia.

===== Group stage =====
Ecuador was drawn into Group A with Argentina, Chile, and Paraguay. They finished first in the group and advanced to the quarterfinals.

Team	Pld	W	D	L	GF	GA	GD	Pts
Ecuador	3	2	1	0	4	1	+3	7
Argentina	3	1	2	0	3	1	+2	5
Paraguay	3	1	1	1	2	3	−1	4
Chile	3	0	0	3	1	5	−4	0

11 June 1997
21:05

Argentina	0 – 0	Ecuador
	Report

Estadio Félix Capriles, Cochabamba
Attendance: 17,000
Referee: Jorge Nieves (Uruguay)

14 June 1997
16:05

Paraguay	0 – 2	Ecuador
	Report	Sánchez 71'; Graziani 86'

Estadio Félix Capriles, Cochabamba
Attendance: 5,000
Referee: Paolo Borgosano (Venezuela)

17 June 1997
19:05

Chile	1 – 2	Ecuador
Vergara 51'	Report	Graziani 32'; Gavica 55'

Estadio Félix Capriles, Cochabamba
Attendance: 8,000
Referee: Rafael Sanabria (Colombia)

===== Quarterfinals =====
22 June 1997
15:05

Mexico	1 – 1	Ecuador
Blanco 18'	Report	Capurro 6' (pen.)
Penalties
Hernández (penalty scored); Suárez (penalty scored); Chávez (penalty scored); Sánchez (penalty scored); Blanco (penalty missed); Villa (penalty missed)	4 – 3	(penalty scored) Montaño; (penalty scored) Graziani; (penalty scored) Fernández; (penalty missed) Capurro; (penalty missed) de la Cruz; (penalty missed) Rosero

Estadio Félix Capriles, Cochabamba
Attendance: 6,000
Referee: Antônio Pereira (Brazil)

==== Friendlies ====
5 February 1997

Mexico	3 – 1	Ecuador
Rizo 35'; Borgetti 43'; Álvarez 77'		Delgado 82'

Estadio Azteca, Mexico City
Attendance: 15,000
Referee: Benito Archundia (Mexico)

25 March 1997

Guatemala	0 – 0	Ecuador

Estadio Mateo Flores, Guatemala City

28 May 1997

El Salvador	0 – 2	Ecuador
		Graziani 9' de la Cruz 81'

Estadio Cuscatlán, San Salvador
Attendance: 8,000

7 August 1997

United States	0 – 1	Ecuador
		Sánchez 82'

Baltimore Arena, Baltimore
Attendance: 13,629
Referee: Raúl Domínguez (United States)

10 September 1997

Brazil	4 – 2	Ecuador
Denílson 16'; Dodô 27', 38'; Emerson 73'		Aguinaga 66'; Maldonado 76'

Estádio Fonte Nova, Salvador
Attendance: 30,000
Referee: Jorge Nieves (Uruguay)
