= 1997 Copa América Group A =

Football tournament group stage

The Group A of the 1997 Copa América was one of the three groups of competing nations in the 1997 Copa América. It comprised Argentina, Chile, Ecuador, and Paraguay. Group play began on 11 June and ended on 17 June.

Ecuador won the group and faced Mexico—the runner-up of Group С—in the quarterfinals. Argentina finished second and faced Peru—the runner-up of Group B—in the quarterfinals. Paraguay finished third and faced Brazil—the winners of Group C—in the quarterfinals. Chile finished fourth in the group, and were eliminated from the tournament.

== Standings ==
Team	Pld	W	D	L	GF	GA	GD	Pts
Ecuador	3	2	1	0	4	1	+3	7
Argentina	3	1	2	0	3	1	+2	5
Paraguay	3	1	1	1	2	3	−1	4
Chile	3	0	0	3	1	5	−4	0

Teams that advanced to the quarterfinals

- Group winners
- Group runners-up
- Best two third-placed teams among all groups

== Matches ==
=== Paraguay v Chile ===
11 June 1997

Paraguay	1–0	Chile
Acuña 28'	Report

Estadio Félix Capriles, Cochabamba
Attendance: 17,000
Referee: René Ortubé (Bolivia)

=== Ecuador v Argentina ===
11 June 1997

Ecuador	0–0	Argentina
	Report

Estadio Félix Capriles, Cochabamba
Attendance: 17,000
Referee: Jorge Nieves (Uruguay)

=== Paraguay v Ecuador ===
14 June 1997

Paraguay	0–2	Ecuador
	Report	Sánchez 71'; Graziani 86'

Estadio Félix Capriles, Cochabamba
Attendance: 5,000
Referee: Paolo Borgosano (Venezuela)

=== Argentina v Chile ===
14 June 1997

Argentina	2–0	Chile
Berti 83'; Gallardo 86'	Report

Estadio Félix Capriles, Cochabamba
Attendance: 9,000
Referee: Antônio Pereira (Brazil)

=== Chile v Ecuador ===
17 June 1997

Chile	1–2	Ecuador
Vergara 52'	Report	Graziani 32'; Gavica 55'

Estadio Félix Capriles, Cochabamba
Attendance: 8,000
Referee: Rafael Sanabria (Colombia)

=== Paraguay v Argentina ===
17 June 1997

Paraguay	1–1	Argentina
Chilavert 73' (pen.)	Report	Gallardo 90' (pen.)

Estadio Félix Capriles, Cochabamba
Attendance: 8,000
Referee: Jorge Nieves (Uruguay)
