= 1997 Liga Deportiva Universitaria de Quito season =

LDU Quito
1997 season
- President: Darío Ávila
- Manager: Fernando Rodríguez Riolfo
- Stadium: Estadio Casa Blanca
- Serie A: 4th
- Top goalscorer: Paúl Guevara (14 goals)
Home colours	Away colours

Liga Deportiva Universitaria de Quito's 1997 season was the club's 67th year of existence, the 44th year in professional football, and the 37th in the top level of professional football in Ecuador.

== Kits ==
Supplier: Umbro
Sponsor(s): Volvo, Autosueco

== Squad ==
No.	Pos.	Nation	Player
—	GK	ECU	Jacinto Espinoza
—	GK	ECU	Víctor Sánchez
—	GK	ECU	Miguel Santillán
—	DF	ECU	Jorge Ballesteros
—	DF	ARG	Miguel D'Agostino
—	DF	ECU	Ulises de la Cruz
—	DF	ECU	Santiago Jácome
—	DF	COL	Ever Palacios
—	DF	ECU	Néicer Reasco
—	DF	ECU	Danilo Samaniego
—	MF	ECU	Nixon Carcelén (captain)
—	MF	BRA	Marcos Da Bahia
—	MF	ECU	Luis Escalante
—	MF	COL	Álex Escobar
—	MF	ECU	Luis González

No.	Pos.	Nation	Player
—	MF	ECU	Juan Guamán
—	MF	ECU	Paúl Guevara
—	MF	ECU	Johnny León
—	MF	ECU	Robert Macías
—	MF	ECU	Miguel Mina
—	MF	ECU	Luis Pozo
—	MF	ECU	Hjalmar Zambrano
—	FW	ECU	Jhon Arteaga
—	FW	ARG	Ariel Bravo
—	FW	ECU	Segundo Escobar
—	FW	ECU	Energio Díaz
—	FW	BRA	Mané Ferreira
—	FW	ECU	Patricio Hurtado
—	FW	ECU	Pedro Salvador
—	FW	COL	Henry Zambrano

== Competitions ==
=== Serie A ===
==== First stage ====
===== Group 2 =====
Pos	Team	Pld	W	D	L	GF	GA	GD	Pts	Qualification
1	LDU Quito	10	6	3	1	23	10	+13	21	Qualified to the Liguilla Final
3	Olmedo	10	6	2	2	11	8	+3	20	
2	Emelec	10	5	3	2	20	11	+9	18	
4	ESPOLI	10	2	4	4	9	15	−6	10	
5	Deportivo Quito	10	1	3	6	10	17	−7	6	
6	Deportivo Quevedo	10	0	5	5	6	18	−12	5	

===== Results =====
Home \ Away	CDQ	SDQ	CSE	CDE	LDU	CDO
Deportivo Quevedo					2–4	
Deportivo Quito					1–2	
Emelec					2–0	
ESPOLI					1–1	
LDU Quito	5–0	1–1	4–1	3–1		2–0
Olmedo					1–1	

Source: RSSSF
Legend: Blue = home team win; Yellow = draw; Red = away team win.

==== Second stage ====
Pos	Team	Pld	W	D	L	GF	GA	GD	Pts	Qualification
1	Barcelona	22	14	5	3	45	20	+25	47	Qualified to the Liguilla Final
2	Deportivo Quito	22	11	9	2	38	15	+23	42	Qualified to the Liguilla Final
3	LDU Quito	22	12	6	4	39	19	+20	42	
4	Emelec	22	13	3	6	42	30	+12	42	
5	Deportivo Cuenca	22	9	5	8	30	32	−2	32	
6	El Nacional	22	9	4	9	35	26	+9	31	
7	Técnico Universitario	22	8	6	8	26	27	−1	30	
8	Aucas	22	9	3	10	29	32	−3	30	
9	ESPOLI	22	8	4	10	35	39	−4	28	
10	Calvi	22	7	3	12	35	40	−5	24	
11	Olmedo	22	4	5	13	26	47	−21	17	
12	Deportivo Quevedo	22	0	3	19	9	62	−53	3	

===== Results =====
Home \ Away	SDA	BSC	CFC	CDC	CDQ	SDQ	EN	CSE	CDE	LDU	CDO	TU
Aucas										3–0		
Barcelona										2–1		
Calvi										1–3		
Deportivo Cuenca										0–0		
Deportivo Quevedo										0–2		
Deportivo Quito										1–1		
El Nacional										1–1		
Emelec										1–0		
ESPOLI										2–2		
LDU Quito	3–1	2–0	2–0	2–0	4–1	1–1	1–2	1–1	4–0		4–1	2–1
Olmedo										0–2		
Técnico Universitario										1–2		

Source: RSSSF
Legend: Blue = home team win; Yellow = draw; Red = away team win.

==== Aggregate Table ====
Pos	Team	Pld	W	D	L	GF	GA	GD	Pts	Qualification
1	Barcelona	32	20	7	5	62	28	+34	67	Qualified to the Liguilla Final
2	LDU Quito	32	18	9	5	62	29	+33	63	Qualified to the Liguilla Final
3	Emelec	32	18	6	8	62	41	+21	60	Qualified to the Liguilla Final
4	El Nacional	32	14	7	11	56	37	+19	49	Qualified to the Liguilla Final
5	Deportivo Quito	32	12	12	8	48	32	+16	48	Qualified to the Liguilla Final
6	Aucas	32	15	3	14	45	43	+2	48	Qualified to the Liguilla Final
7	Deportivo Cuenca	32	13	9	10	43	45	−2	48	
8	Técnico Universitario	32	10	10	12	38	43	−5	40	
9	ESPOLI	32	10	8	14	44	54	−10	38	Qualified to the Liguilla Descenso
10	Olmedo	32	10	7	15	37	55	−18	37	Qualified to the Liguilla Descenso
11	Calvi	32	7	4	21	44	69	−25	25	Qualified to the Liguilla Descenso
12	Deportivo Quevedo	32	0	8	24	15	80	−65	8	Qualified to the Liguilla Descenso

==== Liguilla Final ====
Pos	Team	Pld	W	D	L	GF	GA	GD	Pts	Qualification
1	Barcelona	10	4	4	2	21	15	+6	19	Champions and Qualified to the 1998 Copa Libertadores
2	Deportivo Quito	10	5	3	2	16	10	+6	19	Qualified to the 1998 Copa Libertadores
3	Emelec	10	4	3	3	18	18	0	15	
4	LDU Quito	10	3	4	3	15	17	−2	14	Qualified to the 1998 Copa CONMEBOL
5	El Nacional	10	3	2	5	17	17	0	11	
6	Aucas	10	1	4	5	9	19	−10	7	

Note: Includes bonus points earned in previous stages: Barcelona (3); D. Quito & LDU Quito (1).

===== Results =====
Home \ Away	SDA	BSC	SDQ	EN	CSE	LDU
Aucas						1–2
Barcelona						2–2
Deportivo Quito						3–1
El Nacional						1–1
Emelec						5–3
LDU Quito	0–1	3–2	0–0	2–1	1–1	

Source: RSSSF
Legend: Blue = home team win; Yellow = draw; Red = away team win.

== Inauguration of Casa Blanca ==
Built between 1995 and 1997, the stadium hosted its first match on March 6 in a friendly game between LDU Quito and Atlético Mineiro of Belo Horizonte.

March 6	LDU Quito	3–1	Atlético Mineiro	Quito
18:00 UTC−05:00	Mané Ferreira 31'; Paúl Guevara 72'; Patricio Hurtado 89'	Report	Nino 52'	Stadium: Estadio Casa Blanca
