= 2006 Eastern League season =

The 2006 Eastern League season began on approximately April 1 and the regular season ended on approximately September 1.

The Portland Sea Dogs defeated the Akron Aeros 3 games to 2 to win the Eastern League Championship Series.

== Regular season ==
=== Standings ===
Eastern League - Northern Division
Team	Win	Loss	%	GB
Trenton Thunder	80	62	.563	–
**Portland Sea Dogs**	72	67	.518	6.5
Binghamton Mets	70	70	.500	9.0
New Hampshire Fisher Cats	68	73	.482	11.5
Connecticut Defenders	64	77	.454	15.5
New Britain Rock Cats	64	78	.451	16.0

Eastern League - Southern Division
Team	Win	Loss	%	GB
**Akron Aeros**	87	55	.613	–
Altoona Curve	75	64	.540	10.5
Reading Phillies	71	69	.507	15.0
Bowie Baysox	67	74	.475	19.5
Harrisburg Senators	67	75	.472	20.0
Erie SeaWolves	60	81	.426	26.5

Notes:

Green shade indicates that team advanced to the playoffs
Bold indicates that team advanced to ELCS
Italics indicates that team won ELCS

=== Statistical league leaders ===
==== Batting leaders ====
Stat	Player	Total
AVG	Jose Reyna (Trenton Thunder)	.332
HR	Chip Cannon (New Hampshire Fisher Cats)	27
RBI	Randy Ruiz (Trenton Thunder)	87
R	Brad Snyder (Akron Aeros)	86

==== Pitching leaders ====
Stat	Player	Total
W	Adam Miller (Akron Aeros)	15
ERA	Phil Hughes (Trenton Thunder)	2.25
SO	Tyler Clippard (Trenton Thunder)	175
SV	Brandon Knight (Altoona Curve)	27

== Playoffs ==
=== Divisional Series ===
==== Northern Division ====
The Portland Sea Dogs defeated the Trenton Thunder in the Northern Division playoffs 3 games to 1.

==== Southern Division ====
The Akron Aeros defeated the Altoona Curve in the Southern Division playoffs 3 games to 2.

=== Championship Series ===
The Portland Sea Dogs defeated the Akron Aeros in the ELCS 3 games to 2.
