= Antonio Pereira =

Antonio Pereira may refer to:

- António Pereira (racewalker), Portuguese race walker
- Antônio Pereira, Brazilian football referee
- António Garcia Pereira, Portuguese lawyer and politician
- António Pereira (wrestler), Portuguese wrestler who competed at the 1912 Summer Olympics
