= Luis Ramos =

Luis Ramos may refer to:

- Luis Ramos (Uruguayan footballer) (born 1939), Uruguayan footballer
- Luis Ramos (Honduran footballer) (born 1985), Honduran footballer
- Luis Ramos (Venezuelan footballer)
- Luis Ramos (footballer, born 1999), Peruvian footballer
- Luis Ramos (fighter) (born 1981), Brazilian mixed martial artist
- Luis Ramos Jr. (born 1988), Mexican American boxer
- Luis Alberto Ramos (born 1953), former Argentine footballer
- Luis Alfredo Ramos (born 1948), Colombian politician
- Luis Antonio Ramos, Puerto Rican-born American actor
- Luis Gregorio Ramos (born 1953), Spanish sprint canoer
- Luis Rosendo Ramos (born 1957), retired road bicycle racer from Mexico
- Luis Vega Ramos (born 1970), Puerto Rican lawyer and politician
