= Frank Palomino =

Peruvian footballer (born 1970)

Personal information
- Date of birth: 1 December 1970 (age 55)
- Place of birth: Cusco, Peru

International career
Years	Team	Apps	(Gls)
1994–2001	Peru	9	(0)

Frank Palomino (born 1 December 1970) is a Peruvian footballer. He played in nine matches for the Peru national football team from 1994 to 2001. He was also part of Peru's squad for the 1997 Copa América tournament.
