= Richard Gómez (footballer) =

Paraguayan footballer (born 1972)

Personal information
- Date of birth: 19 August 1972 (age 54)

International career
| Years | Team | Apps | (Gls) |
| 1997 | Paraguay | 4 | (0) |

Richard Gómez (born 19 August 1972) is a Paraguayan footballer. He played in four matches for the Paraguay national football team in 1997. He was also part of Paraguay's squad for the 1997 Copa América tournament.
