= Jesús Rodríguez (Venezuelan footballer) =

Venezuelan footballer (born 1968)

Personal information
- Date of birth: 24 March 1968 (age 58)

International career
| Years | Team | Apps | (Gls) |
| 1997 | Venezuela | 5 | (0) |

Jesús Rodríguez (born 24 March 1968) is a Venezuelan footballer. He played in five matches for the Venezuela national football team in 1997. He was also part of Venezuela's squad for the 1997 Copa América tournament.
