= John Medina (footballer) =

Venezuelan footballer (born 1968)

Personal information
- Date of birth: 9 September 1968 (age 58)

International career
| Years | Team | Apps | (Gls) |
| 1989–1997 | Venezuela | 4 | (0) |

John Medina (born 9 September 1968) is a Venezuelan footballer. He played in four matches for the Venezuela national football team from 1989 to 1997. He was also part of Venezuela's squad for the 1997 Copa América tournament.
