= Eduardo Smith =

Ecuadorian footballer (born 1966)

Personal information
- Full name: Eduardo Fabián Smith Chávez
- Date of birth: February 23, 1966 (age 60)
- Place of birth: Guayaquil, Ecuador
- Position: Midfielder

Senior career*
Years	Team	Apps	(Gls)
1988–1989	Barcelona SC		
1990	Audaz		
1991–1998	Emelec		
1999	Audaz	34	(0)
2000	Barcelona SC	19	(0)
2001–2002	Santa Rita Vinces	33	(0)

International career
1996–1997	Ecuador	12	(0)
- * Club domestic league appearances and goals

Eduardo Fabián Smith Chávez (born 23 February 1966) is a retired Ecuadorian football midfielder. He was a member of the Ecuador national football team at the 1997 Copa América, and obtained twelve caps during his career.
