= Edmundo Méndez =

Ecuadorian footballer (born 1968)

Personal information
- Full name: Edmundo Marcelo Méndez Quelal
- Date of birth: December 5, 1968 (age 57)
- Place of birth: Quito, Ecuador
- Position: Defender

Senior career*
| Years | Team | Apps | (Gls) |
| 1986–1993 | El Nacional | | |
| 1994–1999 | Deportivo Cuenca | | |
| 1999 | Universidad Católica | 5 | (0) |
| 2000 | Aucas | 23 | (0) |
| 2001 | Deportivo Saquisilí | 11 | (0) |
| 2001 | Macará | 6 | (0) |
| 2003–2004 | Cumanda | | |

International career
| 1996–1997 | Ecuador | 11 | (0) |
- * Club domestic league appearances and goals

Edmundo Marcelo Méndez Quelal (born 5 December 1968) is a retired Ecuadorian football defender. He was a member of the Ecuador national football team at the 1997 Copa América, and obtained a total number of 11 caps during his career.
