= Andrew Páez =

Venezuelan footballer (born 1968)

Personal information
- Date of birth: 28 December 1968 (age 57)
- Place of birth: Mérida, Venezuela

International career
| Years | Team | Apps | (Gls) |
| 1996–1997 | Venezuela | 6 | (0) |

Andrew Páez (born 28 December 1968) is a Venezuelan footballer. He played in six matches for the Venezuela national football team from 1996 to 1997. He was also part of Venezuela's squad for the 1997 Copa América tournament.
