= Germán Muñoz =

Peruvian footballer (born 1973)

Personal information
- Full name: Germán Eduardo Muñoz Ormeño
- Date of birth: 23 June 1973 (age 53)
- Place of birth: Lima, Peru
- Height: 1.81 m (5 ft 11 in)
- Position: Midfielder

Senior career*
Years	Team	Apps	(Gls)
1994–1996	Universitario		
1997–1998	Cienciano		
1999	Deportivo Municipal		
1999	Cienciano		
1999–2001	Sport Boys		
2002	Estudiantes de Medicina		
2003–2004	Alianza Atlético		
2005	Unión Huaral		

International career
1994–1997	Peru	9	(0)
- * Club domestic league appearances and goals

Germán Eduardo Muñoz Ormeño (born 23 June 1973) is a Peruvian footballer who played as a midfielder. He made nine appearances for the Peru national team from 1994 to 1997. He was also part of Peru's squad for the 1997 Copa América tournament.
