= Jorge Alcaraz =

Paraguayan footballer (born 1968)

Personal information
- Date of birth: 4 July 1968 (age 58)

International career
Years	Team	Apps	(Gls)
1995–1997	Paraguay	15	(0)

Jorge Alcaraz (born 4 July 1968) is a Paraguayan footballer. He played in 15 matches for the Paraguay national football team from 1995 to 1997. He was also part of Paraguay's squad for the 1997 Copa América tournament.
