= Aldo Cavero =

Peruvian footballer (born 1971)

Personal information
- Full name: Aldo Jair Cavero Carozzi
- Date of birth: 24 October 1971 (age 55)
- Place of birth: Lima, Peru
- Height: 1.74 m (5 ft 9 in)
- Position: Forward

Senior career*
Years	Team	Apps	(Gls)
- La Loretana
- Cienciano
- Alianza Lima
- FBC Melgar

International career
1997	Peru	2	(0)
- * Club domestic league appearances and goals

Aldo Jair Cavero Carozzi (born 24 October 1971) is a Peruvian former footballer who played as a forward. He made two appearances for the Peru national team in 1997. He was also part of Peru's squad for the 1997 Copa América tournament.
