= Roberto Ruiz =

Roberto Ruiz may refer to:

- Roberto Ruiz Ángeles (born 1956), Mexican politician
- Roberto Ruiz Esparza (born 1965), Mexican footballer
- Roberto Ruiz Esparza Jr. (born 1992), Mexican footballer
- Roberto Ruiz Moronatti (born 1982), Mexican politician
- Roberto Ruiz (artisan), Mexican artisan, winner of the National Prize for Arts and Sciences (Mexico)
- Roberto Ruiz (conductor) (1934–2019), Argentine composer, principal conductor at the Teatro Argentino de La Plata
- Roberto Ruiz, associated with the musical group The Animals
