= Marco Constante =

Ecuadorian footballer (born 1967)

Personal information
- Full name: Marco Vinicius Constante
- Date of birth: March 20, 1967 (age 59)
- Place of birth: Saquisilí, Ecuador
- Height: 1.75 m (5 ft 9 in)
- Position: Midfielder

Senior career*
| Years | Team | Apps | (Gls) |
| 1985–1999 | El Nacional | | |
| 2000 | Deportivo Quito | | |
| 2001–2002 | Saquisilí | | |

International career
| 1997 | Ecuador | 2 | (0) |
- * Club domestic league appearances and goals

Marco Vinicius Constante (born March 20, 1967 in Saquisilí) is a former Ecuadorian football midfielder. He played during the majority of his career for El Nacional.
