= 2001 FBC Melgar season =

FBC Melgar
2001 season
- Stadium: Estadio Monumental Virgen de Chapi
- Torneo Descentralizado: Torneo Apertura: Third (3°); Torneo Clausura: Eighth (8°); Aggregate Table: Seventh (7°); Seventh National (7°)
Home colours	Away colours	Third colours

The 2001 FBC Melgar season were the Eighty-Seventh (87.º) of the club from its foundation in 1915, Thirty-Two (32) participations in the top-flight of Peruvian Primera División (of 85 Editions) with denomination Torneo Descentralizado. In Previous Season the club qualified as 5th Place of the 2000 Torneo Descentralizado.

Melgar were a of twelve (12) clubs in the Thirty-Sixth edition (36.º) Torneo Descentralizado, the competition most important of the Peruvian football. The club played the Peruvian Primera División.

== Torneo Descentralizado ==
=== Torneo Apertura ===
Pos	Team	Pld	W	D	L	GF	GA	GD	Pts
2	Alianza Lima	22	13	7	2	42	19	+23	46
3	Melgar	22	10	5	7	45	30	+15	35
4	Cienciano	22	11	2	9	43	28	+15	35

== See also ==
- FBC Melgar
- 2001 Torneo Descentralizado
