= Arnaldo Espínola =

Paraguayan footballer (born 1975)

Personal information
- Full name: Arnaldo Andrés Espínola Benítez
- Date of birth: 5 March 1975 (age 51)
- Place of birth: Asunción, Paraguay
- Height: 1.87 m (6 ft 2 in)
- Position: Defender

Senior career*
| Years | Team | Apps | (Gls) |
| 1994–1996 | Sportivo Luqueño | | |
| 1997–2001 | Internacional | | |
| 1999 | → Cruzeiro (loan) | 16 | (1) |
| 2002 | Guaraní | 21 | (0) |
| 2003 | Libertad | 21 | (2) |
| 2004 | Universidad de Chile | 34 | (1) |
| 2005 | Cerro Porteño | 19 | (1) |
| 2006 | Huachipato | 25 | (0) |
| 2007 | Talleres de Córdoba | 7 | (0) |
| 2007–2009 | Nacional Asunción | 54 | (4) |
| 2009 | Sportivo Luqueño | 18 | (0) |
| 2010 | 12 de Octubre | 0 | (0) |
| 2011 | Fernando de la Mora | 0 | (0) |

International career^{‡}
| 1997–1999 | Paraguay | 3 | (0) |
- * Club domestic league appearances and goals as of 9 April 2012 ‡ National team caps and goals as of 9 April 2012

Arnaldo Andrés Espínola Benítez (Note: In this Spanish name, the first or paternal surname is Espínola and the second or maternal family name is Benítez.) (born 5 March 1975), known as Arnaldo Espínola, is a former Paraguayan footballer. He also played for clubs from Brazil, Argentina and Chile.

== Honours ==
=== Club ===
Universidad de Chile

- Primera División de Chile (1): 2004 Apertura
