= 1999 FBC Melgar season =

FBC Melgar
1999 season
- Stadium: Estadio Mariano Melgar
- Torneo Descentralizado: Torneo Apertura: Nn (3°); Torneo Clausura: Nn (3°); Nn National (6°)
Home colours	Away colours	Third colours

The 1999 FBC Melgar season were the Eighty-Fifth (85.º) of the club from its foundation in 1915, Thirty (30) participations in the top-flight of Peruvian Primera División (of 83 Editions) with denomination Torneo Descentralizado. In Previous Season the club qualified as 9th Place of 1998 Torneo Descentralizado.

Melgar were a of twelve (12) clubs in the Thirty-Fourth edition (34.º) Torneo Descentralizado, the competition most important of the Peruvian football. The club played the Peruvian Primera División.

== Torneo Descentralizado ==
=== Torneo Apertura ===
Pos	Team	Pld	W	D	L	GF	GA	GD	Pts
4	Cienciano	22	10	5	7	32	25	+7	35
5	FBC Melgar	22	9	6	7	35	27	+8	33
6	Sport Boys	22	7	9	6	29	30	-1	30

== See also ==
- FBC Melgar
- 1999 Torneo Descentralizado
