= Ariel Bravo =

Argentine footballer

Personal information
- Full name: Ariel Fernando Bravo Soldani
- Date of birth: 6 May 1971 (age 55)
- Place of birth: Rosario, Santa Fe, Argentina
- Height: 1.80 m (5 ft 11 in)
- Position: Forward

Youth career
- –1983: El Torito Club
- 1983–1988: Newell's Old Boys

Senior career*
Years	Team	Apps	(Gls)
1989	Unión San Felipe	27	(12)
1990–1992	Palestino	87	(27)
1993	O'Higgins	22	(2)
1994	Cobresal	30	(8)
1995	Provincial Osorno	0	(0)
1995	Minervén		
1996	Coquimbo Unido	17	(1)
1997	LDU Quito		
1998	Real San Luis		
1998	Deportes Concepción	15	(3)
1999	Unión Magdalena		
2000	Deportes Antofagasta		
2003–2004	Utah Blitzz	25	(8)

Managerial career
- La Roca FC (youth)
- La Roca FC (assistant)
- La Roca FC (women)
- * Club domestic league appearances and goals

Ariel Fernando Bravo Soldani (born 6 May 1971) is an Argentine football manager and former player who played as a forward for clubs in South America and North America.

== Playing career ==
As a youth player, Bravo was with El Torito Club and Newell's Old Boys in his homeland.

He moved to Chile and made his professional debut with Unión San Felipe in 1989. In that country, he also played for Palestino, O'Higgins, Cobresal, Provincial Osorno, Coquimbo Unido and Deportes Concepción in the top division. In the second level, he played for Deportes Antofagasta.

Also in South America, he played for Minervén in Venezuela, LDU Quito in Ecuador and Unión Magdalena in Colombia.

In North America, he played for Real San Luis in Mexico and Utah Blitzz in the United States, with whom he won the 2004 USL Pro Soccer League.

== Coaching career ==
Bravo has developed his career in the United States, joining club La Roca FC in 2005, whose founder is the Chilean former player Adolfo Ovalle with whom he coincided in Cobresal, as coach of youth players. Since then, he has also served as assistant coach, coach of the women's team and director of coaching.
