= Alfredo Carmona =

Peruvian footballer (born 1971)

Personal information
- Full name: Alfredo Enrique Carmona Hurtado
- Date of birth: May 10, 1971 (age 55)
- Place of birth: Lima, Peru
- Position: Midfielder

Senior career*
Years	Team	Apps	(Gls)
1987-1992	Club Universitario de Deportes		
1993	Defensor Lima		
1994-1996	Deportivo Municipal		
1997-1998	Sporting Cristal		
1999	Deportivo Municipal		
2000	FBC Melgar		
2001	Deportivo Municipal		
2002-2003	Sport Boys		
2004	Cienciano		
2004-2005	Sport Boys		
2006	Alianza Atlético		

International career
1994-2003	Peru	10	(1)
- * Club domestic league appearances and goals

Alfredo Enrique Carmona Hurtado (born 10 May 1971) is a Peruvian retired footballer.
