= Edison Maldonado =

Ecuadorian footballer (born 1972)

Personal information
- Full name: Edison Néstor Maldonado Villalba
- Date of birth: June 7, 1972 (age 54)
- Place of birth: Quito, Ecuador
- Position: Forward

Senior career*
Years	Team	Apps	(Gls)
1990–1994	Aucas		
1995	Barcelona SC		
1996–1999	Aucas		
1999	Blooming		
2000	El Nacional	27	(0)
2001	Olmedo	38	(0)
2002	Deportivo Quito	18	(0)
2003–2004	Olmedo	60	(20)
2005	Aucas	10	(0)

International career
1994–1999	Ecuador	10	(1)
- * Club domestic league appearances and goals

Edison Néstor Maldonado Villalba (born 7 June 1972, in Quito) is a retired Ecuadorian football forward.

== International career ==
He was a member of the Ecuador national football team at the 1997 Copa América, and obtained a total number of ten caps during his career.
