= José Reyna =

Peruvian footballer (born 1972)

Personal information
- Date of birth: 19 January 1972 (age 54)

International career
Years	Team	Apps	(Gls)
1996–1997	Peru	7	(0)

José Reyna (born 19 January 1972) is a Peruvian footballer. He played in seven matches for the Peru national football team from 1996 to 1997. He was also part of Peru's squad for the 1997 Copa América tournament.
