= Miguel D'Agostino =

Argentine footballer (born 1972)

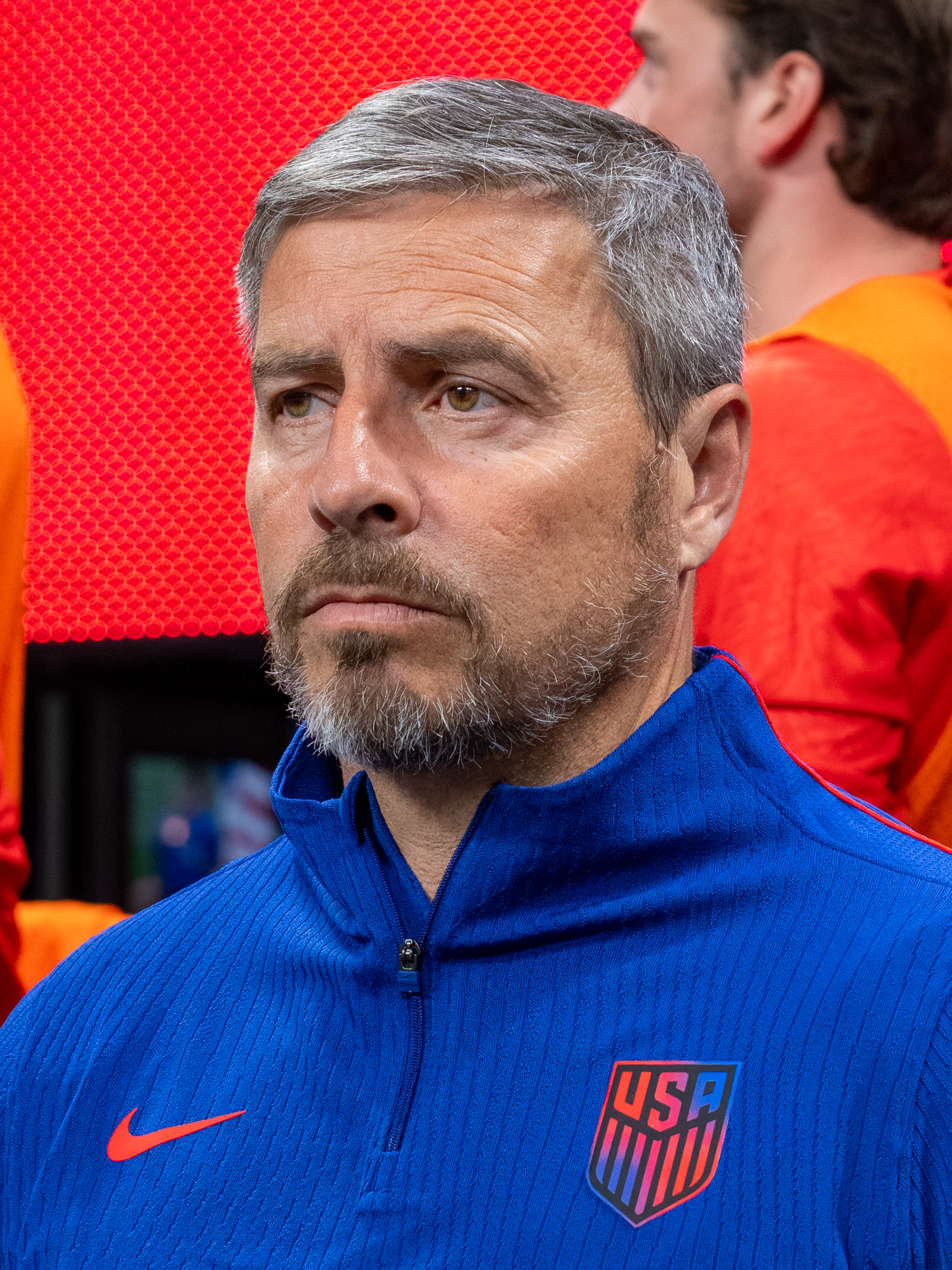

Personal information
- Full name: Miguel Ángel D'Agostino
- Date of birth: 1 January 1972 (age 54)
- Place of birth: Paraná, Argentina
- Height: 1.86 m (6 ft 1 in)
- Position: Defender

Team information
- Current team: Manchester United (Assistant head coach)

Senior career*
Years	Team	Apps	(Gls)
1989–1990	Patronato		
1990–1995	Newell's Old Boys	30	(0)
1995–1996	Gimnasia de Jujuy		
1997	LDU Quito		
1998	Palestino	17	(0)
1999–2000	Compostela	0	(0)
2000–2001	Niort	14	(0)
2001–2002	Canet Roussillon		
2002–2003	Angoulême	3	(0)

Managerial career
- 2002–2003: Canet Roussillon (player-assistant)
- 2003–2007: Brest (assistant)
- 2007–2008: Dubai CSC (assistant)
- 2009–2013: Espanyol (assistant)
- 2013–2014: Southampton (assistant)
- 2014–2019: Tottenham Hotspur (assistant)
- 2021–2022: Paris Saint-Germain (assistant)
- 2023–2024: Chelsea (assistant)
- 2026-: Manchester United (assistant)
- * Club domestic league appearances and goals

Miguel Ángel D'Agostino (Spanish pronunciation: [miˈɣel daɣosˈtino]; born 1 January 1972) is an Argentine former professional footballer and current coach. He played as a defender. He is currently the assistant head coach of Premier League club Manchester United.

== Club career ==
Born in Paraná, Argentina in 1972, D'Agostino began his playing career at local side Patronato, before moving to Newell's Old Boys in 1990. D'Agostino played alongside Mauricio Pochettino in Newell's defence before moving to Spain in 1994. Miguel then had a spell playing with Gimnasia Jujuy before moving to Ecuadorian club L.D.U. Quito. From there, he joined Chilean club Palestino, before following in Pochettino's footsteps and heading to play in Spain with Compostela. The duo moved to France in 2000, with Pochettino joining Paris Saint-Germain and D'Agostino joining Niort.

== Coaching career ==
In the summer 2002, D'Agostino went on to play for Canet-en-Rousillon and then joined Angoulême as a player-assistant. Between 2003 and 2007, he worked as an assistant manager for Brest. Next, D'Agostino spent the 2007–08 season as an assistant coach at Dubai CSC in the United Arab Emirates, before returning to Brest as chief scout.

Following Pochettino's appointment at Espanyol in January 2009, D'Agostino also did some scouting on behalf of his former teammate, Mauricio Pochettino, before moving to Spain on a permanent basis in 2011. The duo left Espanyol in January 2013 and were hired by Southampton. In May 2014, Pochettino was appointed manager of Tottenham Hotspur and took his staff with him, including D'Agostino. On 19 November 2019, Pochettino and his staff were fired. On 2 January 2021, Mauricio Pochettino was appointed as the head coach of Paris Saint-Germain, D'Agostino joined him as assistant.

On 29 May 2023, Mauricio Pochettino was appointed as the head coach of Chelsea, D'Agostino joined him as assistant. On 21 May 2024, Chelsea announced he was leaving the club.
