= Luis Ramos (Venezuelan footballer) =

Venezuelan footballer (born 1966)

Personal information
- Date of birth: 18 February 1966 (age 60)

International career
Years	Team	Apps	(Gls)
1996–1997	Venezuela	8	(0)

Luis Ramos (born 18 February 1966) is a Venezuelan footballer. He played in eight matches for the Venezuela national football team from 1996 to 1997. He was also part of Venezuela's squad for the 1997 Copa América tournament.
