= Alfonso Dulanto =

Peruvian footballer (born 1969)

Personal information
- Full name: Alfonso Antonio Dulanto Corzo
- Date of birth: 22 July 1969 (age 57)
- Place of birth: Lima, Peru
- Height: 1.86 m (6 ft 1 in)
- Position: Centre back

Senior career*
Years	Team	Apps	(Gls)
1989–1990	Lau Chun		
1991	Hijos de Yurimaguas		
1992–1995	Universitario		
1995–1996	Mérida	11	(0)
1996	Universitario	9	(1)
1997	UNAM Pumas	27	(0)
1997–1998	APOEL	16	(0)
1998	Deportivo Municipal	28	(2)
1999	Universitario	10	(0)
2000–2001	Melgar	71	(6)
2002	Estudiantes Medicina	17	(0)
2002–2003	Melgar	45	(1)
2004–2005	USMP	26	(0)

International career
1994–1997	Peru	25	(0)
- * Club domestic league appearances and goals

Alfonso Antonio Dulanto Corzo (born 22 July 1969) is a retired Peruvian footballer who played as a central defender.

== Club career ==
During his 16-year professional career, Dulanto rarely settled with a team. In his country, he played professionally for Hijos de Yurimaguas, Universitario (his biggest stint with any team, three years – he represented this team on three separate periods), Deportivo Municipal, Melgar (two stints), Estudiantes de Medicina and Universidad San Martín.

Abroad, he appeared for Mérida (Spain, Segunda División), Mexico's UNAM Pumas and APOEL of Cyprus, eventually retiring with USPM in 2005, at 36.

== International career ==
Dulanto made 25 appearances for Peru, his debut coming on 5 May 1994, in a friendly match with Honduras. He appeared in two Copa América tournaments, helping the national side reach the semifinals in the 1997 edition, in Bolivia.

== Honours ==
Universitario

- Torneo Descentralizado: 1992, 1993, 1999
