= Leonardo Uehara =

Peruvian footballer (born 1974)

Personal information
- Full name: Leonardo Uehara La Serna
- Date of birth: 8 June 1974 (age 52)
- Place of birth: Pucallpa, Peru
- Height: 1.71 m (5 ft 7 in)
- Position: Midfielder

Senior career*
| Years | Team | Apps | (Gls) |
| 1995–1997 | La Loretana | | |
| 1998 | Universitario | 0 | (0) |
| 1998 | → FBC Melgar (loan) | | |
| 1999–2003 | FBC Melgar | | |
| 2004 | Atlético Universidad | 13 | (0) |
| 2005 | Alianza Atlético | 18 | (0) |
| 2010 | Tecnológico de Pucallpa | 9 | (3) |
| 2013–2014 | Defensor San Alejandro | | |

International career
| 1997 | Peru | | |
- * Club domestic league appearances and goals

Leonardo Uehara La Serna (born 8 June 1974) is a Peruvian professional footballer who played as midfielder.

== Playing career ==
Leonardo Uehara became known in the 1990s when he was the playmaker for La Loretana, a club in his hometown of Pucallpa, with whom he won the Copa Perú in 1995. In 1998 he signed with Universitario de Deportes, but did not play any official matches there, so he was loaned to FBC Melgar of Arequipa until the end of the year. In 1999, he permanently joined FBC Melgar and remained there until 2003.

After brief stints with Atlético Universidad in 2004, followed by Alianza Atlético in 2005, Uehara returned to Pucallpa to play in the second division for Tecnológico de Pucallpa in 2010. While this seemed to be his last experience in football, he joined Defensor San Alejandro in 2013 for a final spell in the second division.

Although Leonardo Uehara never played for the Peruvian national team, he was nevertheless called up by Freddy Ternero to the squad selected for the 1997 Copa América in Bolivia.

== Honours ==
La Loretana

- Copa Perú: 1995
