= Hidrobo Rosero =

Ecuadorian footballer (born 1974)

Personal information
- Full name: Hidrobo Vilson Rosero Rodríguez
- Date of birth: 24 August 1974 (age 52)
- Place of birth: Chimborazo Province, Ecuador
- Position: Midfielder

Senior career*
Years	Team	Apps	(Gls)
1993–1998	El Nacional		
1999	Universidad Católica	3	(0)
2000	Macará	16	(0)
2001–2002	El Nacional	11	(0)
2003–2005	Aucas	99	(12)
2006	Universidad Católica		

International career
1997	Ecuador	4	(0)
- * Club domestic league appearances and goals

Hidrobo Vilson Rosero Rodríguez (born 24 August 1974) is a retired Ecuadorian football midfielder.

== International career ==
He was a member of the Ecuador national football team at the 1997 Copa América, and obtained a total number of four caps during his career and was a member of the Ecuador squad for Copa América 1997.
