= Sergio Berti =

Argentine footballer

Personal information
- Full name: Sergio Ángel Berti Pizzani
- Date of birth: 17 September 1969 (age 57)
- Place of birth: Villa Constitución, Argentina
- Height: 1.83 m (6 ft 0 in)
- Position: Midfielder

Senior career*
| Years | Team | Apps | (Gls) |
| 1988–1990 | Boca Juniors | 6 | (1) |
| 1990–1992 | River Plate | 51 | (14) |
| 1992–1993 | Parma | 4 | (0) |
| 1993–1995 | River Plate | 55 | (16) |
| 1995–1996 | Zaragoza | 16 | (0) |
| 1996–1999 | River Plate | 63 | (9) |
| 1999–2000 | América | 21 | (3) |
| 2000 | Al Ain | ? | (?) |
| 2001 | Huracán | 10 | (4) |
| 2002 | Barcelona SC | 5 | (0) |
| 2002 | Livingston | 0 | (0) |
| Total | | 231 | (47) |

International career
| 1994–1998 | Argentina | 22 | (1) |
- * Club domestic league appearances and goals

Sergio Ángel Berti (born 17 February 1969) is an Argentine retired professional footballer, nicknamed La Bruja, who played as a midfielder.

== Club career ==
Born in Villa Constitución, Santa Fe, Berti began his career in 1988 with popular club Boca Juniors. In 1990, he found his way out of la Bombonera in a transfer to fierce rival River Plate. The red stripe was indeed the club he spent most of his career with, not to mention short spells in between for Parma and Real Zaragoza. At River, Berti lived the golden era winning five titles including three domestic tournaments, the 1996 Copa Libertadores and the 1997 Supercopa Sudamericana. In 1999, Mexican club América acquired total ownership of his rights.

In the 2000 Copa Libertadores, when América came to visit his former club Boca Juniors for the first leg match of the semifinals, just minutes before the start of the game Berti withdraw from playing, arguing being scared for the safety of his family and himself based on the chants of the Barra of Boca Juniors. America lost that game 4–1 and Berti never played again with America. In 2001 Berti returned to Argentina and signed for recently promoted team Huracán. The following year, he had a brief stint at Barcelona SC of Ecuador.

His career came to an abrupt end in 2002 at the Scottish Premier League side Livingston after spitting at teammate Richard Brittain, during a pre-season friendly.

== International career ==
Berti was capped in 22 matches and scored one goal for Argentina, including two appearances during the 1998 FIFA World Cup and converting his penalty in the shoot-out against England in the Second Round. He was also a member of the national team that participated in Copa América 1995 and Copa América 1997.

== Honours ==
Boca Juniors

- Supercopa Sudamericana: 1989

Parma FC

- UEFA Cup Winners' Cup: 1992-93

River Plate

- Argentine Primera División: 1991 Apertura, 1993 Apertura, 1994 Apertura, 1996 Apertura, 1997 Apertura, 1997 Clausura
- Copa Libertadores: 1996
- Supercopa Sudamericana: 1997
