= Luis Capurro =

Ecuadorian footballer (born 1961)

Personal information
- Full name: Luis Enrique Capurro Bautista
- Date of birth: May 1, 1961 (age 65)
- Place of birth: Esmeraldas, Ecuador
- Height: 1.80 m (5 ft 11 in)
- Position: Left-back

Senior career*
Years	Team	Apps	(Gls)
1978–1983	Patria de Esmeraldes		
1983	Milago Sporting		
1984–1988	Filanbanco		
1989–1992	Emelec		
1993	Cerro Porteño		
1994–1996	Emelec		
1996	Racing Club	0	(0)
1997–1998	Barcelona SC	62	(2)
1999–2000	LDU Quito	60	(1)

International career
1985–2003	Ecuador	100	(1)
- * Club domestic league appearances and goals

Luis Enrique Capurro Bautista (born May 1, 1961) is an Ecuadorian former professional footballer who played as a left-back. He made 100 appearances for the Ecuador national team.

== Club career ==
Capurro was born in Esmeraldas, Ecuador. He began his career in Patria De Esmeraldas (Ecuador. He also played for Barcelona SC, Emelec, Patria de Guayaquil, Milagro Sport, Filanbanco, LDU Quito, Cerro Porteño of Paraguay and Racing Club of Argentina.

Capurro won two Ecuadorian league titles, in 1994 with Emelec and in 1997 with Barcelona SC.

His large moustache and regular appearances for the Ecuador national team helped him to get recognised around South America and he got his dream to play outside of Ecuador. He joined Cerro Porteño of Paraguay in 1993, later in his career he went Argentina to play for Racing Club de Avellaneda of Coco Basile, but soon returned to Ecuador.

== Honours ==
Emelec

- Ecuadorian Serie A: 1993, 1994

Barcelona S.C.

- Ecuadorian Serie A: 1997

LDU Quito

- Ecuadorian Serie A: 1999

Ecuador

- Korea Cup: 1995

== See also ==
- List of men's footballers with 100 or more international caps
