= Antônio Pereira =

Brazilian football referee

Antônio Pereira da Silva
- Full name: Antônio Pereira da Silva
- Born: 25 May 1957 (age 69); Brazil

Domestic
Years	League	Role

International
Years	League	Role
1996–1997	FIFA listed	Referee

Antônio Pereira da Silva (born May 25, 1957) is a former football referee from Brazil. He officiated the football tournament in the 1996 Summer Olympics in Atlanta, United States, and the 1997 Copa América.
