= Wellington Sánchez =

Ecuadorian footballer (born 1974)

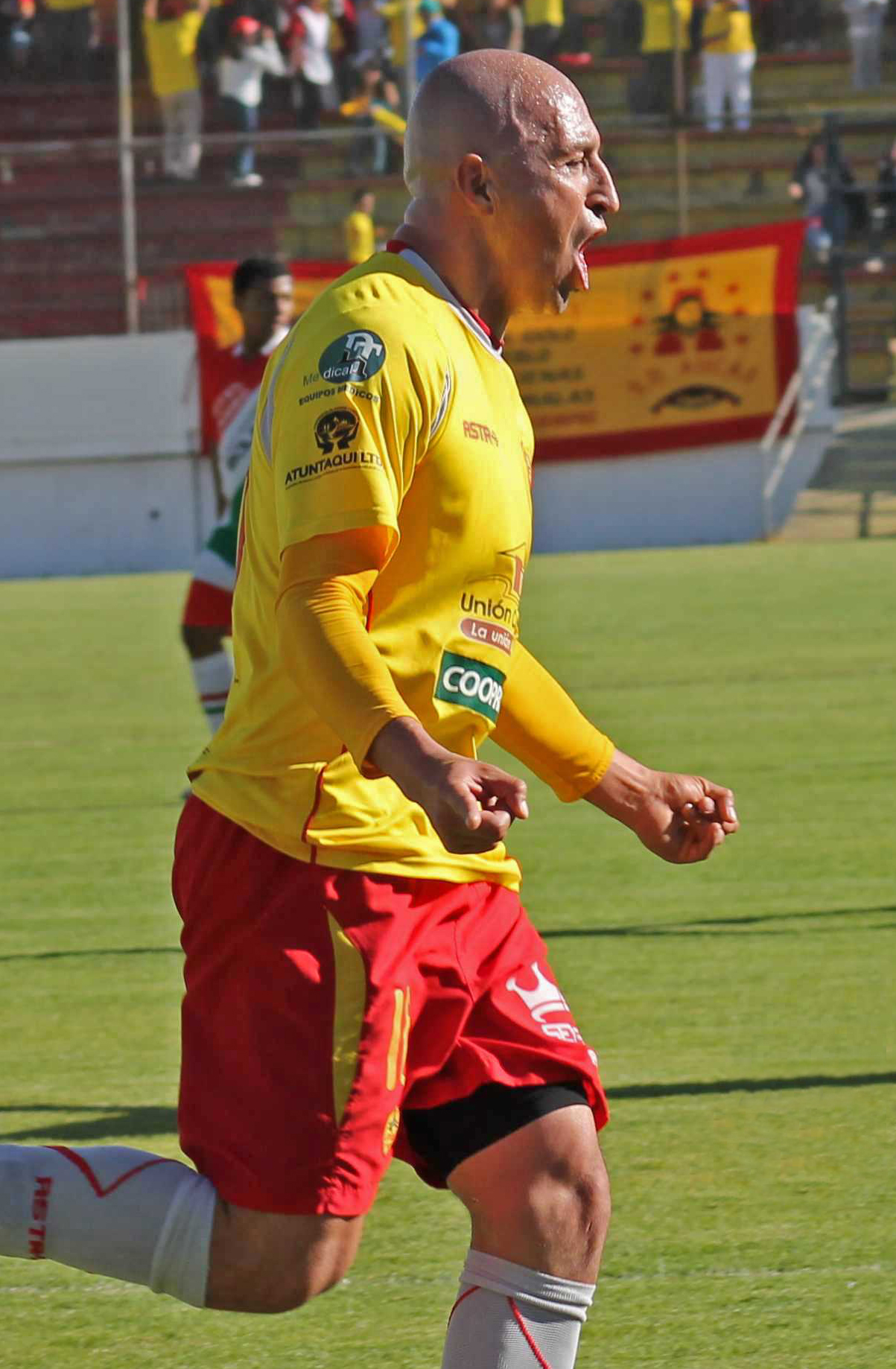
- Sánchez in 2012

Personal information
- Full name: Wellington Eduardo Sánchez Luzuriaga
- Date of birth: June 19, 1974 (age 52)
- Place of birth: Ambato, Ecuador
- Height: 1.80 m (5 ft 11 in)
- Position: Midfielder

Senior career*
Years	Team	Apps	(Gls)
1992–1993	Técnico Universitario	41	(1)
1993	Universidad Católica		
1994–1998	El Nacional	132	(24)
1998	MetroStars	1	(0)
1998–1999	LA Galaxy	12	(1)
1999–2004	Emelec	183	(37)
2005–2010	El Nacional	179	(16)
2011	Independiente José Terán	27	(0)
2012–2013	Aucas	16	(4)
2014–2016	Mushuc Runa	35	(1)
2016	C.D. Técnico Universitario	5	(0)
2016	C.D. Olmedo	9	(0)

International career
1994–2004	Ecuador	44	(3)
- * Club domestic league appearances and goals as of July 5, 2009

Wellington Eduardo Sánchez Luzuriaga (born 19 June 1974, in Ambato) is a former Ecuadorian football midfielder who last played for C.D. Olmedo.

He played for a few clubs, including Nacional Quito, MetroStars (USA), Los Angeles Galaxy (USA), CS Emelec and Aucas.

He played for the Ecuador national football team and was a participant at the 2002 FIFA World Cup.

== Titles ==
- El Nacional
  - Serie A: 1996, 2006
- Emelec
  - Serie A: 2001, 2002
- Aucas
  - Segunda Categoria: 2012
