= 1997 Copa América =

Tournament details
- Host country: Bolivia
- Dates: 11–29 June
- Teams: 12 (from 2 confederations)
- Venues: 5 (in 5 host cities)

Final positions
- Champions: Brazil (5th title)
- Runners-up: Bolivia
- Third place: Mexico
- Fourth place: Peru

Tournament statistics
- Matches played: 26
- Goals scored: 67 (2.58 per match)
- Attendance: 456,020 (17,539 per match)
- Top scorer(s): (Mexico) Luis Hernández (6 goals)
- Best player: (Brazil) Ronaldo

The 1997 Copa America was the 38th edition of the Copa America. It was held in Bolivia from 11 to 29 June. It was organized by CONMEBOL, South America's football governing body.

In this edition, Costa Rica and Mexico were the invited teams to bring up the total number of competing teams to 12.

The tournament was won by Brazil, who became the first team to hold the Copa América and the World Cup at the same time, a feat they would repeat in 2004, and which Argentina would also achieve in 2024. It was the first Copa America won by Brazil outside of Brazil.

== Venues ==
La Paz	Santa Cruz	Cochabamba
Estadio Hernando Siles	Estadio Ramón Tahuichi Aguilera	Estadio Félix Capriles
Capacity: 51,000	Capacity: 42,000	Capacity: 36,000
Sucre	1997 Copa América is located in Bolivia	
Estadio Olímpico Patria	1997 Copa América is located in Bolivia	
Capacity: 29,000	1997 Copa América is located in Bolivia	
Oruro	1997 Copa América is located in Bolivia	
Estadio Jesús Bermúdez	1997 Copa América is located in Bolivia	
Capacity: 28,000	1997 Copa América is located in Bolivia	

== Squads ==
For a complete list of participating squads: 1997 Copa América squads

== Match officials ==
Argentina

- Horacio Elizondo

Bolivia

- René Ortubé
- Juan Carlos Paniagua

Brazil

- Antônio Pereira

Chile

- Eduardo Gamboa

Colombia

- Rafael Sanabria

Costa Rica

- Rodrigo Badilla

Ecuador

- Byron Moreno

Mexico

- Antonio Marrufo

Paraguay

- Epifanio González

Peru

- José Arana

Uruguay

- Jorge Nieves

United States

- Esfandiar Baharmast

Venezuela

- Paolo Borgosano

== Group stage ==
The teams were divided into three groups of four teams each. The formation of the groups was made by CONMEBOL, in a public drawing of lots that took place on 17 December 1996.

Each team plays one match against each of the other teams within the same group. Three points are awarded for a win, one point for a draw and zero points for a defeat.

First and second placed teams, in each group, advance to the quarter-finals. The best third placed team and the second best third placed team, also advance to the quarter-finals.

- Tie-breaker
  - If teams finish leveled on points, the following tie-breakers are used:
  1. greater goal difference in all group games;
  2. greater number of goals scored in all group games;
  3. winner of the head-to-head match between the teams in question;
  4. drawing of lots.

Key to colors in group tables
Group winners, runners-up, and best two third-placed teams advance to the quarter-finals

=== Group A ===
Team	Pld	W	D	L	GF	GA	GD	Pts
Ecuador	3	2	1	0	4	1	+3	7
Argentina	3	1	2	0	3	1	+2	5
Paraguay	3	1	1	1	2	3	−1	4
Chile	3	0	0	3	1	5	−4	0

11 June 1997

Paraguay	1–0	Chile
Acuña 28'	Report

Estadio Félix Capriles, Cochabamba
Attendance: 15,000
Referee: René Ortubé (Bolivia)
11 June 1997

Ecuador	0–0	Argentina
	Report

Estadio Félix Capriles, Cochabamba
Attendance: 16,200
Referee: Jorge Nieves (Uruguay)

14 June 1997

Paraguay	0–2	Ecuador
	Report	Sánchez 71'; Graziani 86'

Estadio Félix Capriles, Cochabamba
Attendance: 5,000
Referee: Paolo Borgosano (Venezuela)
14 June 1997

Argentina	2–0	Chile
Berti 83'; Gallardo 86'	Report

Estadio Félix Capriles, Cochabamba
Attendance: 6,000
Referee: Antônio Pereira (Brazil)

17 June 1997

Chile	1–2	Ecuador
Vergara 52'	Report	Graziani 32'; Gavica 55'

Estadio Félix Capriles, Cochabamba
Attendance: 7,000
Referee: Rafael Sanabria (Colombia)
17 June 1997

Paraguay	1–1	Argentina
Chilavert 73' (pen.)	Report	Gallardo 90' (pen.)

Estadio Félix Capriles, Cochabamba
Attendance: 8,000
Referee: Jorge Nieves (Uruguay)

=== Group B ===
Team	Pld	W	D	L	GF	GA	GD	Pts
Bolivia (H)	3	3	0	0	4	0	+4	9
Peru	3	2	0	1	3	2	+1	6
Uruguay	3	1	0	2	2	2	0	3
Venezuela	3	0	0	3	0	5	−5	0

(H) Hosts
12 June 1997

Peru	1–0	Uruguay
Hidalgo 75'	Report

Estadio Olímpico Patria, Sucre
Attendance: 4,000
Referee: Antonio Marrufo (Mexico)
12 June 1997

Bolivia	1–0	Venezuela
Coimbra 60'	Report

Estadio Hernando Siles, La Paz
Attendance: 11,000
Referee: Byron Moreno (Ecuador)

15 June 1997

Uruguay	2–0	Venezuela
Recoba 19'; Saralegui 47'	Report

Estadio Olímpico Patria, Sucre
Attendance: 1,000
Referee: Eduardo Gamboa (Chile)
15 June 1997

Bolivia	2–0	Peru
Etcheverry 45'; Baldivieso 50'	Report

Estadio Hernando Siles, La Paz
Attendance: 15,000
Referee: Rodrigo Badilla (Costa Rica)

18 June 1997

Peru	2–0	Venezuela
Cominges 13', 59'	Report

Estadio Olímpico Patria, Sucre
Attendance: 3,500
Referee: Byron Moreno (Ecuador)
18 June 1997

Bolivia	1–0	Uruguay
Baldivieso 29'	Report

Estadio Hernando Siles, La Paz
Attendance: 30,000
Referee: Antonio Marrufo (Mexico)

=== Group C ===
Team	Pld	W	D	L	GF	GA	GD	Pts
Brazil	3	3	0	0	10	2	+8	9
Mexico	3	1	1	1	5	5	0	4
Colombia	3	1	0	2	5	5	0	3
Costa Rica	3	0	1	2	2	10	−8	1

13 June 1997

Mexico	2–1	Colombia
Hernández 7', 11'		Ricard 58'

Estadio Ramón Tahuichi Aguilera, Santa Cruz
Attendance: 25,000
Referee: Horacio Elizondo (Argentina)
13 June 1997

Brazil	5–0	Costa Rica
Djalminha 20'; González 34' (o.g.); Ronaldo 47', 54'; Romário 60'

Estadio Ramón Tahuichi Aguilera, Santa Cruz
Attendance: 25,000
Referee: Epifanio González (Paraguay)

16 June 1997

Colombia	4–1	Costa Rica
Morantes 13', 23'; Cabrera 62' (pen.); Aristizábal 78'		Wright 66'

Estadio Ramón Tahuichi Aguilera, Santa Cruz
Attendance: 25,000
Referee: Esfandiar Baharmast (United States)
16 June 1997

Brazil	3–2	Mexico
Aldair 47'; Romero 59' (o.g.); Leonardo 77'		Hernández 13', 31'

Estadio Ramón Tahuichi Aguilera, Santa Cruz
Attendance: 30,000
Referee: José Arana (Peru)

19 June 1997

Mexico	1–1	Costa Rica
Hernández 14' (pen.)		Medford 60'

Estadio Ramón Tahuichi Aguilera, Santa Cruz
Attendance: 15,000
Referee: Epifanio González (Paraguay)
19 June 1997

Brazil	2–0	Colombia
Dunga 11'; Edmundo 67'

Estadio Ramón Tahuichi Aguilera, Santa Cruz
Attendance: 30,567
Referee: Juan Carlos Paniagua (Bolivia)

=== Ranking of third-placed teams ===
At the end of the first stage, a comparison was made between the third-placed teams of each group. The two best third-placed teams advanced to the quarter-finals.

Grp	Team	Pld	W	D	L	GF	GA	GD	Pts
A	Paraguay	3	1	1	1	2	3	−1	4
C	Colombia	3	1	0	2	5	5	0	3
B	Uruguay	3	1	0	2	2	2	0	3

== Knockout stage ==
Quarter-finals
22 June – Santa Cruz
Brazil	2
Paraguay	0
21 June – Sucre
Peru	2
Argentina	1
21 June – La Paz
Bolivia	2
Colombia	1
22 June – Cochabamba
Mexico	1 (4)
Ecuador	1 (3)

Semi-finals
26 June – Santa Cruz
Brazil	7
Peru	0
25 June – La Paz
Bolivia	3
Mexico	1

Final
29 June – La Paz
Brazil	3
Bolivia	1
Third place
28 June – Oruro
Peru	0
Mexico	1

=== Quarter-finals ===
21 June 1997

Peru	2–1	Argentina
Carazas 30'; Hidalgo 61'	Report	Gallardo 66' (pen.)

Estadio Olímpico Patria, Sucre
Attendance: 9,000
Referee: Byron Moreno (Ecuador)

21 June 1997

Bolivia	2–1	Colombia
Etcheverry 3'; Sánchez 24'	Report	Gaviria 57'

Estadio Hernando Siles, La Paz
Attendance: 21,000
Referee: Horacio Elizondo (Argentina)

22 June 1997

Mexico	1–1	Ecuador
Blanco 17'	Report	Capurro 6' (pen.)
Penalties
Hernández (penalty scored); Suárez (penalty scored); Blanco (penalty missed); Chávez (penalty scored); Villa (penalty missed); Sánchez (penalty scored)	4–3	(penalty scored) Montaño; (penalty missed) Capurro; (penalty missed) De la Cruz; (penalty scored) Graziani; (penalty scored) Fernández; (penalty missed) Rosero

Estadio Félix Capriles, Cochabamba
Attendance: 7,000
Referee: Antônio Pereira (Brazil)

22 June 1997
17:30

Brazil	2–0	Paraguay
Ronaldo 9', 34'	Report

Estadio Ramón Tahuichi Aguilera, Santa Cruz
Attendance: 35,000
Referee: Rafael Sanabria (Colombia)

=== Semi-finals ===
25 June 1997

Bolivia	3–1	Mexico
E. Sánchez 27'; R. Castillo 39'; Moreno 79'	Report	Ramírez 8'

Estadio Hernando Siles, La Paz
Attendance: 39,000
Referee: Epifanio González (Paraguay)

26 June 1997

Brazil	7–0	Peru
Denílson 1'; Conceição 20'; Romário 36', 49'; Leonardo 45', 55'; Djalminha 77'	Report

Estadio Ramón Tahuichi Aguilera, Santa Cruz
Attendance: 21,000
Referee: Rodrigo Badilla (Costa Rica)

=== Third-place match ===
28 June 1997
19:00

Mexico	1–0	Peru
Hernández 82'	Report

Estadio Jesús Bermúdez, Oruro
Attendance: 8,000
Referee: Paolo Borgosano (Venezuela)

=== Final ===
29 June 1997
17:10 (UTC-4)

Brazil	3–1	Bolivia
Denilson 40'; Ronaldo 79'; Zé Roberto 90'	Report	E. Sánchez 45'

Estadio Hernando Siles, La Paz
Attendance: 43,753
Referee: Jorge Nieves (Uruguay)

== Result ==
1997 Copa América champions

Brazil
Fifth title

== Goalscorers ==
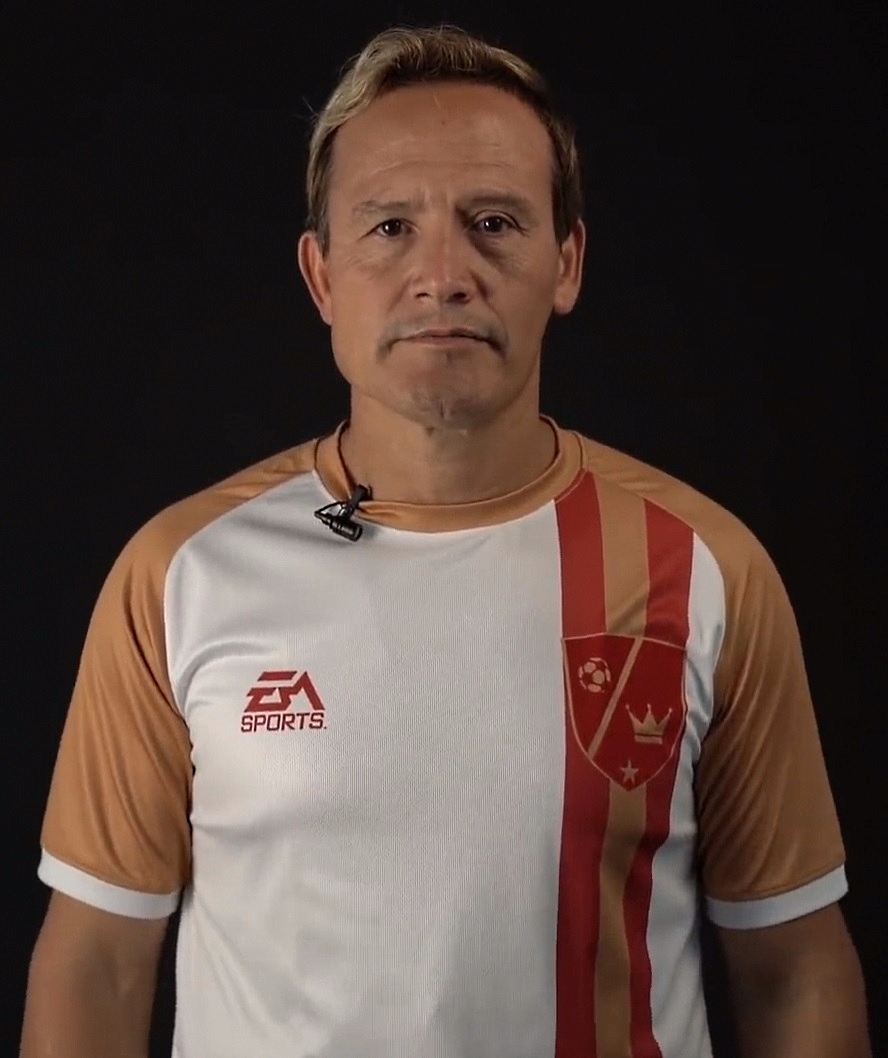
Luis Hernández, top scorer

With six goals, Luis Hernández was the top scorer in the tournament. There were 67 goals scored in 26 matches, for an average of 2.58 goals per match.

6 goals

- (Mexico) Luis Hernández

5 goals

- (Brazil) Ronaldo

3 goals

- (Argentina) Marcelo Gallardo
- (Bolivia) Erwin Sánchez
- (Brazil) Leonardo
- (Brazil) Romário

2 goals

- (Bolivia) Julio César Baldivieso
- (Bolivia) Marco Etcheverry
- (Brazil) Djalminha
- (Brazil) Edmundo
- (Colombia) Neider Morantes
- (Ecuador) Ariel Graziani
- (Peru) Paul Cominges
- (Peru) Martín Hidalgo

1 goal

- (Argentina) Sergio Berti
- (Bolivia) Ramiro Castillo
- (Bolivia) Milton Coimbra
- (Bolivia) Jaime Moreno
- (Brazil) Aldair
- (Brazil) Flávio Conceição
- (Brazil) Denílson
- (Brazil) Dunga
- (Brazil) Zé Roberto
- (Chile) Fernando Vergara
- (Colombia) Víctor Aristizábal
- (Colombia) Wilmer Cabrera
- (Colombia) Hernán Gaviria
- (Colombia) Hámilton Ricard
- (Costa Rica) Hernán Medford
- (Costa Rica) Mauricio Wright
- (Ecuador) Luis Capurro
- (Ecuador) José Gavica
- (Ecuador) Wellington Sánchez
- (Mexico) Cuauhtémoc Blanco
- (Mexico) Nicolás Ramírez
- (Paraguay) Roberto Acuña
- (Paraguay) José Luis Chilavert
- (Peru) Eddy Carazas
- (Uruguay) Álvaro Recoba
- (Uruguay) Marcelo Saralegui

1 own goal

- (Costa Rica) Rónald González (against Brazil)
- (Mexico) Camilo Romero (against Brazil)

== Final positions ==
Pos	Team	Pld	W	D	L	GF	GA	GD	Pts	Eff
1	Brazil	6	6	0	0	22	3	+19	18	100%
2	Bolivia	6	5	0	1	10	5	+5	15	83.5%
3	Mexico	6	2	2	2	8	9	−1	8	44.4%
4	Peru	6	3	0	3	5	11	−6	9	50%
Eliminated in the Quarterfinals
5	Ecuador	4	2	2	0	5	2	+3	8	66.7%
6	Argentina	4	1	2	1	4	3	+1	5	41.7%
7	Paraguay	4	1	1	2	2	5	−3	4	33.3%
8	Colombia	4	1	0	3	6	7	−1	3	25%
Eliminated in the First Stage
9	Uruguay	3	1	0	2	2	2	0	3	33.3%
10	Costa Rica	3	0	1	2	2	10	−8	1	11.1%
11	Chile	3	0	0	3	1	5	−4	0	0%
12	Venezuela	3	0	0	3	0	5	−5	0	0%
