= Mexico national football team results =

This article summarizes the outcomes of all official matches played by the Mexico national football team by opponent and by year.

== All time results ==
The following table shows Mexico's all-time international record, correct as of 3 October 2026.

Against	Played	Won	Drawn	Lost	GF	GA
Total	995	516	229	250	1763	1012

== Results 1923–1959 ==
Date	Location	Opponents	Score	Competition	Referee
9 December 1923	Mexico City	Guatemala	2–1	Friendly	(Mexican Football Federation) E. Galvadá
12 December 1923	Mexico City	Guatemala	2–0	Friendly	(German Football Association) E. Giffening
16 December 1923	Mexico City	Guatemala	3–3	Friendly	(Football Association of Ireland) R. Cockburn
30 May 1928	(Netherlands) Amsterdam	Spain	1–7	1928 Summer Olympics	(Hungarian Football Federation) G. Boronkay
5 June 1928	(Netherlands) Arnhem	Chile	1–3	1928 Summer Olympics	(Football Association of Indonesia) M. de V. Foltynski
13 July 1930	(Uruguay) Montevideo	France	1–4	1930 FIFA World Cup	(Uruguayan Football Association) D. Lombardi
16 July 1930	(Uruguay) Montevideo	Chile	0–3	1930 FIFA World Cup	(Royal Belgian Football Association) H. Christophe
19 July 1930	(Uruguay) Montevideo	Argentina	3–6	1930 FIFA World Cup	(Bolivian Football Federation) U. Salcedo
14 December 1930	Mexico City	Foreign team	1–2	Friendly	Unknown
4 March 1934	Mexico City	Cuba	3–2	1934 FIFA World Cup qualification	(United States Soccer Federation) E. Donaghy
11 March 1934	Mexico City	Cuba	5–0	1934 FIFA World Cup qualification	(United States Soccer Federation) E. Donaghy
18 March 1934	Mexico City	Cuba	4–1	1934 FIFA World Cup qualification	(United States Soccer Federation) E. Donaghy
24 May 1934	(Italy) Rome	United States	2–4	1934 FIFA World Cup qualification	(Egyptian Football Association) Y. Mohamed
27 March 1935	(El Salvador) San Salvador	El Salvador	8–1	1935 Central American and Caribbean Games	(Costa Rican Football Federation) M. Rodríguez
28 March 1935	(El Salvador) San Salvador	Guatemala	5–1	1935 Central American and Caribbean Games	(Costa Rican Football Federation) A. Esquivel
30 March 1935	(El Salvador) San Salvador	Cuba	6–1	1935 Central American and Caribbean Games	(Costa Rican Football Federation) M. Rodríguez
1 April 1935	(El Salvador) San Salvador	Honduras	8–2	1935 Central American and Caribbean Games	(Salvadoran Football Federation) S. Herrera
2 April 1935	(El Salvador) San Salvador	Costa Rica	2–0	1935 Central American and Caribbean Games	(Royal Spanish Football Federation) J. de Foinquinos
12 September 1937	Mexico City	United States	7–2	Friendly	(Mexican Football Federation) V. Rubio
19 September 1937	Mexico City	United States	7–3	Friendly	(Mexican Football Federation) H. Salceda
25 September 1937	Mexico City	United States	5–1	Friendly	(Mexican Football Federation) J. López
10 February 1938	Panama City	Colombia	3–1	1938 Central American and Caribbean Games	(Uruguayan Football Association) R. Mirabal
14 February 1938	Panama City	Venezuela	1–0	1938 Central American and Caribbean Games	(Royal Spanish Football Federation) P. Elías
18 February 1938	Panama City	El Salvador	6–0	1938 Central American and Caribbean Games	(Uruguayan Football Association) R. Mirabal
20 February 1938	Panama City	Panama	2–2	1938 Central American and Caribbean Games	(Uruguayan Football Association) R. Mirabal
22 February 1938	Panama City	Costa Rica	2–1	1938 Central American and Caribbean Games	(Uruguayan Football Association) R. Mirabal
13 July 1947	(Cuba) Havana	United States	5–0	1947 NAFC Championship	(Football Association of Cuba) J. Tapia
17 July 1947	(Cuba) Havana	Cuba	3–1	1947 NAFC Championship	(United States Soccer Federation) S. Gabin
2 August 1948	(England) Dulwich	South Korea	3–5	1948 Summer Olympics	(Football Association of Yugoslavia) L. Lemesic
4 September 1949	Mexico City	United States	6–0	1950 FIFA World Cup qualification	(Football Association of Cuba) J. Tapia
11 September 1949	Mexico City	Cuba	2–0	1950 FIFA World Cup qualification	(United States Soccer Federation) P. García
18 September 1949	Mexico City	United States	6–2	1950 FIFA World Cup qualification	(Football Association of Cuba) J. Tapia
25 September 1949	Mexico City	Cuba	3–0	1950 FIFA World Cup qualification	(United States Soccer Federation) P. García
24 June 1950	(Brazil) Rio de Janeiro	Brazil	0–4	1950 FIFA World Cup	(The Football Association) G. Reader
29 June 1950	(Brazil) Porto Alegre	Yugoslavia	1–4	1950 FIFA World Cup	(The Football Association) R. Leafe
2 July 1950	(Brazil) Porto Alegre	Switzerland	1–2	1950 FIFA World Cup	(Swedish Football Association) I. Eklind
23 March 1952	(Chile) Santiago	Uruguay	1–3	1952 Panamerican Championship	(The Football Association) W. Crawford
26 March 1952	(Chile) Santiago	Chile	0–4	1952 Panamerican Championship	(The Football Association) G. Sunderland
6 April 1952	(Chile) Santiago	Brazil	0–2	1952 Panamerican Championship	(The Football Association) C. Dean
10 April 1952	(Chile) Santiago	Panama	4–2	1952 Panamerican Championship	(The Football Association) W. Manning
20 April 1952	(Chile) Santiago	Peru	0–3	1952 Panamerican Championship	(The Football Association) C. McKenna
19 July 1953	Mexico City	Haiti	8–0	1954 FIFA World Cup qualification	(The Football Association) W. Crawford
27 December 1953	(Haiti) Port-au-Prince	Haiti	0–4	1954 FIFA World Cup qualification	(Netherlands Antillean Football Union) A. Van Rosberg
10 January 1954	Mexico City	United States	4–0	1954 FIFA World Cup qualification	(The Football Association) G. Sunderland
14 January 1954	Mexico City	United States	3–1	1954 FIFA World Cup qualification	(United States Soccer Federation) J. Best
16 June 1954	(Switzerland) Geneva	Brazil	5–0	1954 FIFA World Cup	(Swiss Football Association) P. Wissling
19 June 1954	(Switzerland) Geneva	France	3–2	1954 FIFA World Cup	(Royal Spanish Football Federation) M. Asensi
26 February 1956	Mexico City	Costa Rica	1–1	1956 Panamerican Championship	(Argentine Football Association) A. Rossi
4 March 1956	Mexico City	Peru	0–2	1956 Panamerican Championship	(Brazilian Football Confederation) A. da Gama
8 March 1956	Mexico City	Brazil	1–2	1956 Panamerican Championship	(Football Federation of Chile) Vicuña
13 March 1956	Mexico City	Argentina	0–0	1956 Panamerican Championship	(Brazilian Football Confederation) A. da Gama
17 March 1956	Mexico City	Chile	2–1	1956 Panamerican Championship	(Costa Rican Football Federation) D. Alfaro
7 April 1957	Mexico City	United States	6–0	1958 FIFA World Cup qualification	(Netherlands Antillean Football Union) W. Van Rosberg
27 April 1957	(United States) Long Beach	United States	2–7	1958 FIFA World Cup qualification	(Canadian Soccer Association) R. Morgan
30 June 1957	Mexico City	Canada	3–0	1958 FIFA World Cup qualification	(Netherlands Antillean Football Union) W. Van Rosberg
3 July 1957	Mexico City	Canada	2–0	1958 FIFA World Cup qualification	(Netherlands Antillean Football Union) W. Van Rosberg
8 June 1958	(Sweden) Stockholm	Sweden	3–0	1958 FIFA World Cup	(Football Federation of the Soviet Union) Latyshev
11 June 1958	(Sweden) Stockholm	Wales	1–1	1958 FIFA World Cup	(Football Association of Yugoslavia) L. Lemesic
15 June 1958	(Sweden) Sandviken	Hungary	4–0	1958 FIFA World Cup	(Swedish Football Association) A. Erikkson
1 March 1959	Mexico City	Costa Rica	3–1	Friendly	(Brazilian Football Confederation) E. Quiroz
8 March 1959	(Costa Rica) San José	Costa Rica	1–2	Friendly	(National Autonomous Federation of Football of Honduras) G. Sánchez
24 May 1959	Mexico City	England	2–1	Friendly	(Brazilian Football Confederation) E. Quiroz

== Results 1960–1969 ==
Date	Location	Opponents	Score	Competition	Referee
6 March 1960	(Costa Rica) San José	Brazil	2–2	1960 Panamerican Championship	(Costa Rican Football Federation) Soto Paris
10 March 1960	(Costa Rica) San José	Argentina	2–3	1960 Panamerican Championship	(Brazilian Football Confederation) A. Villarino
13 March 1960	(Costa Rica) San José	Costa Rica	1–1	1960 Panamerican Championship	(Argentine Football Association) L. Ventre
15 March 1960	(Costa Rica) San José	Brazil	2–1	1960 Panamerican Championship	(Costa Rican Football Federation) Soto Paris
17 March 1960	(Costa Rica) San José	Argentina	2–0	1960 Panamerican Championship	(Costa Rican Football Federation) Soto Paris
20 March 1960	(Costa Rica) San José	Costa Rica	0–3	1960 Panamerican Championship	(Argentine Football Association) L. Ventre
26 June 1960	Mexico City	Netherlands	3–1	Friendly	(Peruvian Football Federation) A. Yamasaki
6 November 1960	(United States) Chicago	United States	3–3	1962 FIFA World Cup qualification	(Canadian Soccer Association) D. Kulai
13 November 1960	Mexico City	United States	3–0	1962 FIFA World Cup qualification	(National Autonomous Federation of Football of Honduras) G. Sanchez
22 March 1961	(Costa Rica) San José	Costa Rica	1–0	1962 FIFA World Cup qualification	(Brazilian Football Confederation) E. Quiroz
5 April 1961	Mexico City	Netherlands Antilles	7–0	1962 FIFA World Cup qualification	(Canadian Soccer Association) R. Morgan
19 April 1961	(Netherlands) Amsterdam	Netherlands	1–2	Friendly	(Swedish Football Association) K. Johansson
29 April 1961	(Czechoslovakia) Ostrava	Czechoslovakia	2–1	Friendly	(Polish Football Association) J. Kowal
10 May 1961	(England) London	England	0–8	Friendly	(Scottish Football Association) R. Davidson
16 May 1961	(Norway) Bergen	Norway	1–1	Friendly	(Swedish Football Association) B. Loff
29 October 1961	Mexico City	Paraguay	1–0	1962 FIFA World Cup qualification	(Netherlands Antillean Football Union) Walter van Rosberg
5 November 1961	(Paraguay) Asunción	Paraguay	0–0	1962 FIFA World Cup qualification	(Uruguayan Football Association) P. Albergatti
22 March 1962	(Argentina) Buenos Aires	Argentina	1–0	Friendly	(Argentine Football Association) C. Nay Foino
1 April 1962	(Colombia) Bogotá	Colombia	0–1	Friendly	(Colombian Football Federation) O. Orrego
4 April 1962	(Colombia) Cali	Colombia	2–2	Friendly	(Colombian Football Federation) O. Orrego
25 April 1962	Mexico City	Colombia	1–0	Friendly	(Mexican Football Federation) F. Buergo
22 May 1962	Mexico City	Wales	2–1	Friendly	(Italian Football Federation) D. de Leo
30 May 1962	(Chile) Vina del Mar	Brazil	2–0	1962 FIFA World Cup	(Swiss Football Association) G. Dienst
3 June 1962	(Chile) Viña del Mar	Spain	0–1	1962 FIFA World Cup	(Football Association of Yugoslavia) B. Tesanić
7 June 1962	(Chile) Viña del Mar	Czechoslovakia	3–1	1962 FIFA World Cup	(Swiss Football Association) G. Dienst
24 March 1963	(El Salvador) Santa Ana	Netherlands Antilles	2–1	1963 CONCACAF Championship	(Panamanian Football Federation) J. Morán
28 March 1963	(El Salvador) Santa Ana	Jamaica	8–0	1963 CONCACAF Championship	(Nicaraguan Football Federation) J. Utrecho
30 March 1963	(El Salvador) Santa Ana	Costa Rica	0–0	1963 CONCACAF Championship	(Colombian Football Federation) S. De La Rosa
28 February 1965	(Honduras) San Pedro Sula	Honduras	1–0	1966 FIFA World Cup qualification	(National Football Federation of Guatemala) J. Corado
7 March 1965	(United States) Los Angeles	United States	2–2	1966 FIFA World Cup qualification	(Canadian Soccer Association) R. Morgan
12 March 1965	Mexico City	United States	2–0	1966 FIFA World Cup qualification	(Nicaraguan Football Federation) J. Utrecho
28 March 1965	Guatemala City	El Salvador	2–0	1965 CONCACAF Championship	(Costa Rican Football Federation) M. Araya
1 April 1965	Guatemala City	Netherlands Antilles	5–0	1965 CONCACAF Championship	(National Football Federation of Guatemala) E. Aguilar
4 April 1965	Guatemala City	Haiti	3–0	1965 CONCACAF Championship	(Netherlands Antillean Football Union) T. Koetsier
6 April 1965	Guatemala City	Costa Rica	1–1	1965 CONCACAF Championship	(National Football Federation of Guatemala) E. Aguilar
25 April 1965	(Costa Rica) San José	Costa Rica	0–0	1966 FIFA World Cup qualification	(Canadian Soccer Association) R. Morgan
3 May 1965	(Jamaica) Kingston	Jamaica	2–3	1966 FIFA World Cup qualification	(National Football Federation of Guatemala) J. Méndez
7 May 1965	Mexico City	Jamaica	8–0	1966 FIFA World Cup qualification	(Nicaraguan Football Federation) R. Navarro
24 April 1966	Mexico City	Paraguay	7–0	Friendly	(Italian Football Federation) D. de Leo
11 May 1966	Mexico City	Chile	1–0	Friendly	(The Football Association) K. Hollwey
29 May 1966	(Chile) Santiago	Chile	0–1	Friendly	(The Football Association) K. Hollowey
18 June 1966	(Switzerland) Lausanne	Switzerland	1–1	Friendly	(Luxembourg Football Federation) M. Frisch
22 June 1966	(Northern Ireland) Belfast	Northern Ireland	4–1	Friendly	(The Football Association) J. Taylor
26 June 1966	(Italy) Florence	Italy	5–0	Friendly	(Hungarian Football Federation) I. Zsolt
13 July 1966	(England) London	France	1–1	1966 FIFA World Cup	(Israel Football Association) M. Ashkenazi
16 July 1966	(England) London	England	2–0	1966 FIFA World Cup	(Italian Football Federation) C. Lo Bello
19 July 1966	(England) London	Uruguay	0–0	1966 FIFA World Cup	(Swedish Football Association) B. Lööw
5 January 1967	Mexico City	Switzerland	3–0	Friendly	(Peruvian Football Federation) A. Yamasaki
8 January 1967	(Mexico) Guadalajara	Switzerland	0–2	Friendly	(Peruvian Football Federation) A. Yamasaki
6 March 1967	(Honduras) Tegucigalpa	Nicaragua	4–0	1967 CONCACAF Championship	(National Football Federation of Guatemala) C. Pontaza
10 March 1967	(Honduras) Tegucigalpa	Guatemala	1–0	1967 CONCACAF Championship	(Netherlands Antillean Football Union) A. Van Rosberg
12 March 1967	(Honduras) Tegucigalpa	Trinidad and Tobago	4–0	1967 CONCACAF Championship	(National Football Federation of Guatemala) C. Pontaza
14 March 1967	(Honduras) Tegucigalpa	Haiti	1–0	1967 CONCACAF Championship	(National Autonomous Federation of Football of Honduras) J. Dimas
28 May 1967	(Soviet Union) Leningrad	Soviet Union	2–0	Friendly	(Football Association of Finland) H. Kosvin
22 August 1967	Mexico City	Argentina	2–1	Friendly	(Mexican Football Federation) A. Aguilar
5 December 1967	Mexico City	Hungary	2–1	Friendly	(Mexican Football Federation) A. Aguilar
7 December 1967	Mexico City	Hungary	1–2	Friendly	(Mexican Football Federation) R. Osorio
7 March 1968	(Mexico) León	Soviet Union	1–1	Friendly	(Mexican Football Federation) A. Aguilar
21 May 1968	Mexico City	Uruguay	3–3	Friendly	(Peruvian Football Federation) A. Yamasaki
28 May 1968	Mexico City	Uruguay	2–2	Friendly	(Peruvian Football Federation) A. Yamasaki
7 July 1968	Mexico City	Brazil	0–2	Friendly	(Football Federation of Chile) C. Robles
10 July 1968	Mexico City	Brazil	2–1	Friendly	(Football Federation of Chile) C. Robles
27 August 1968	Mexico City	Chile	3–1	Friendly	(Mexican Football Federation) A. Aguilar
29 September 1968	(Mexico) León	Ethiopia	3–0	Friendly	(Peruvian Football Federation) A. Yamasaki
16 October 1968	(Colombia) Bogotá	Colombia	0–1	Friendly	(Football Federation of Chile) M. Cannesa
20 October 1968	(Peru) Lima	Peru	3–3	Friendly	(Peruvian Football Federation) A. Tejada
23 October 1968	(Chile) Santiago	Chile	3–1	Friendly	(Football Federation of Chile) D. Masaro
26 October 1968	(Uruguay) Montevideo	Uruguay	2–0	Friendly	(Uruguayan Football Association) E. Marino
31 October 1968	(Brazil) Rio de Janeiro	Brazil	1–2	Friendly Team details: Brazil / Mexico; GK / 1 / Felix / / (substituted off) 46'; RB / 2 / Brito; CB / 3 / Everaldo; CB / 4 / Carlos Alberto / Yellow card; LB / 5 / Paulo Borges / / (substituted off) 46'; RM / 10 / Roberto Dias; CM / 8 / Gerson; LM / 6 / Paulo Cezar; RF / 7 / Rivellino; CF / 10 / Pelé / (c); LF / 11 / Jairzinho / / (substituted off) 46'; Substitutes: CM / 19 / Natal / / (substituted on) 46'; CM / 23 / Tostao / / (substituted on) 46'; Manager: Aymore Moreira: GK / 1 / Antonio Mota; CB / 14 / Gabriel Nunez; CB / 4 / Gustavo Pena; CB / 3 / Mario Perez; LB / 5 / Jose Vantolra; RM / 17 / Ernesto Cisneros / / (substituted off) 46'; CM / 8 / Isidoro Diaz / / (substituted off) 46'; CM / 6 / Antonio Munguia; LM / 10 / Jose Luis Gonzalez; RF / 9 / Javier Fragoso / / / (substituted off) 64'; LF / 11 / Enrique Borja / (c); Substitutes: LF / 17 / Magdaleno Mercado / / (substituted on) 64'; CM / 21 / Aaron Padilla / / (substituted on) 46'; CB / 22 / Javier Valdivia / / (substituted on) 46'; Manager: Raul Cardenas	(Football Federation of Chile) C. Robles
3 November 1968	(Brazil) Belo Horizonte	Brazil	2–1	Friendly	(Football Federation of Chile) C. Robles
22 December 1968	Mexico City	Germany	0–0	Friendly	(National Football Federation of Guatemala) A. Robles
1 January 1969	Mexico City	Italy	2–3	Friendly	(Mexican Football Federation) Aguilar Elizalde
5 January 1969	Mexico City	Italy	1–1	Friendly	(Italian Football Federation) Sbardella
22 January 1969	Mexico City	Denmark	3–0	Friendly	(Peruvian Football Federation) A. Yamasaki
4 February 1969	(Mexico) León	Colombia	1–0	Friendly	(Mexican Football Federation) Aguilar Elizalde
6 April 1969	(Portugal) Lisbon	Portugal	0–0	Friendly	(Royal Spanish Football Federation) G. Pintado
10 April 1969	Luxembourg City	Luxembourg	2–1	Friendly	(French Football Federation) P. Poncin
16 April 1969	(Belgium) Brussels	Belgium	2–0	Friendly	(French Football Federation) R. Helies
22 April 1969	(Spain) Seville	Spain	0–0	Friendly	(Portuguese Football Federation) M. Lousada
1 May 1969	(Sweden) Malmö	Sweden	1–0	Friendly	(German Football Association) H. Siebert
6 May 1969	(Denmark) Copenhagen	Denmark	3–1	Friendly	(Norwegian Football Federation) H. Oberg
8 May 1969	(Norway) Oslo	Norway	0–2	Friendly	(Danish Football Association) G. Michaelsen
20 May 1969	Mexico City	Peru	0–1	Friendly	(Football Federation of Chile) C. Robles
1 June 1969	Mexico City	England	0–0	Friendly	(Peruvian Football Federation) A. Tejada
3 June 1969	(Mexico) Guadalajara	England	0–4	Friendly	(Peruvian Football Federation) A. Tejada
21 October 1969	Mexico City	Bermuda	3–0	1969 CONCACAF Championship qualification	(Salvadoran Football Federation) S. Martínez
2 November 1969	(Bermuda) Hamilton	Bermuda	2–1	1969 CONCACAF Championship qualification	(United States Soccer Federation) J. di Salvatori
5 November 1969	Mexico City	Belgium	1–0	Friendly	(Football Federation of Chile) M. Cannesa
11 November 1969	Mexico City	Norway	4–0	Friendly	(Football Federation of Chile) M. Cannesa
27 November 1969	(Costa Rica) San José	Jamaica	2–0	1969 CONCACAF Championship	(Salvadoran Football Federation) D. Avendaño
30 November 1969	(Costa Rica) San José	Costa Rica	2–0	1969 CONCACAF Championship	(United States Soccer Federation) J. Landawer
2 December 1969	(Costa Rica) San José	Guatemala	1–0	1969 CONCACAF Championship	(Curaçao Football Federation) T. Koetzier
4 December 1969	(Costa Rica) San José	Netherlands Antilles	2–2	1969 CONCACAF Championship	(Costa Rican Football Federation) Soto Paris
7 December 1969	(Costa Rica) San José	Trinidad and Tobago	0–0	1969 CONCACAF Championship	(Curaçao Football Federation) T. Koetzier

== Results 1970–1979 ==
Date	Location	Opponents	Score	Competition	Referee
15 February 1970	Mexico City	Bulgaria	1–1	Friendly	(Italian Football Federation) D. de Leo
18 February 1970	(Mexico) León	Bulgaria	2–0	Friendly	(Football Federation of Chile) M. Canessa
22 February 1970	Mexico City	Sweden	0–0	Friendly	(Football Federation of Chile) M. Canessa
26 February 1970	Mexico City	Soviet Union	0–0	Friendly	(Football Federation of Chile) M. Canessa
1 March 1970	(Mexico) Puebla	Sweden	0–1	Friendly	(Football Federation of Chile) M. Canessa
5 March 1970	(Peru) Lima	Peru	0–1	Friendly	(Austrian Football Association) E. Hieger
8 March 1970	(Peru) Lima	Peru	1–0	Friendly	(Peruvian Football Federation) A. Tejada
15 March 1970	Mexico City	Peru	3–1	Friendly	(Italian Football Federation) D. de Leo
18 March 1970	(Mexico) León	Peru	3–3	Friendly	(Mexican Football Federation) Aguilar Elizalde
28 April 1970	(Mexico) León	Ecuador	4–2	Friendly	(Italian Football Federation) D. de Leo
31 May 1970	Mexico City	Soviet Union	0–0	1970 FIFA World Cup	(German Football Association) K. Tschenscher
7 June 1970	Mexico City	El Salvador	4–0	1970 FIFA World Cup	(Egyptian Football Association) H. Kandil
11 June 1970	Mexico City	Belgium	1–0	1970 FIFA World Cup	(Argentine Football Association) A. Coerezza
14 June 1970	(Mexico) Toluca	Italy	1–4	1970 FIFA World Cup	(Swiss Football Association) R. Scheurer
30 September 1970	(Brazil) Rio de Janeiro	Brazil	2–1	Friendly	(Argentine Football Association) N. Coerezza
1 December 1970	Mexico City	Australia	3–0	Friendly	(Mexican Football Federation) A. Aguilar
17 February 1971	(Mexico) Guadalajara	Soviet Union	0–0	Friendly	(Mexican Football Federation) J. Galindo
20 February 1971	Mexico City	Soviet Union	0–0	Friendly	(Italian Football Federation) D. de Leo
6 July 1971	Mexico City	Greece	1–1	Friendly	(Mexican Football Federation) A. Archundia
18 August 1971	(Mexico) Guadalajara	East Germany	0–1	Friendly	(Mexican Football Federation) J. Galindo
8 September 1971	(Germany) Hanover	Germany	5–0	Friendly	(Swedish Football Association) B. Loow
11 September 1971	(Morocco) Casablanca	Morocco	2–1	Friendly	(Royal Moroccan Football Federation) A. Madani
18 September 1971	(East Germany) Leipzig	East Germany	1–1	Friendly	(Hungarian Football Federation) G. Emsberger
22 September 1971	(Socialist Federal Republic of Yugoslavia) Sarajevo	Yugoslavia	4–0	Friendly	(Hungarian Football Federation) S. Perti
25 September 1971	(Italy) Genoa	Italy	2–0	Friendly	(Royal Spanish Football Federation) J. Ortiz
30 September 1971	(Greece) Thessaloniki	Greece	0–1	Friendly	(Hellenic Football Federation) E. Papavasiliou
6 October 1971	(Bermuda) Hamilton	Bermuda	0–2	1971 CONCACAF Championship qualification	(United States Soccer Federation) De Salvatore
13 October 1971	Mexico City	Bermuda	4–0	1971 CONCACAF Championship qualification	(Football Federation of Chile) M. Canessa
21 November 1971	(Trinidad and Tobago) San Fernando	Haiti	0–0	1971 CONCACAF Championship	(National Football Federation of Guatemala) A. Robles
26 November 1971	(Trinidad and Tobago) Port of Spain	Trinidad and Tobago	0–2	1971 CONCACAF Championship	(Costa Rican Football Federation) J. Soto París
28 November 1971	(Trinidad and Tobago) Port of Spain	Cuba	1–0	1971 CONCACAF Championship	(Trinidad and Tobago Football Association) De Gourville
2 December 1971	(Trinidad and Tobago) Port of Spain	Costa Rica	0–1	1971 CONCACAF Championship	(National Football Federation of Guatemala) A. Robles
4 December 1971	(Trinidad and Tobago) Port of Spain	Honduras	2–1	1971 CONCACAF Championship	(Costa Rican Football Federation) Soto París
26 January 1972	(Mexico) Guadalajara	Chile	2–0	Friendly	(Mexican Football Federation) A. Aguilar
5 April 1972	Mexico City	Peru	2–1	Friendly	(Mexican Football Federation) J. Galindo
6 August 1972	(Costa Rica) San José	Costa Rica	1–0	Friendly	(Costa Rican Football Federation) E. Sibaja
9 August 1972	(Peru) Lima	Peru	3–2	Friendly	(Peruvian Football Federation) C. Rivero
16 August 1972	(Chile) Santiago	Chile	0–2	Friendly	(Football Federation of Chile) J. Silvagno
24 August 1972	(Canada) Toronto	Canada	0–1	1973 CONCACAF Championship qualification	(Jamaica Football Federation) K. Chaplin
3 September 1972	Mexico City	United States	3–1	1973 CONCACAF Championship qualification	(Trinidad and Tobago Football Association) De Gourville
6 September 1972	Mexico City	Canada	2–1	1973 CONCACAF Championship qualification	(Netherlands Antillean Football Union) T. Koetzier
10 September 1972	(United States) Los Angeles	United States	1–2	1973 CONCACAF Championship qualification	(Costa Rican Football Federation) Soto Paris
12 October 1972	Mexico City	Costa Rica	3–0	Friendly	(Mexican Football Federation) J. Galindo
6 February 1973	Mexico City	Argentina	2–0	Friendly	(Mexican Football Federation) M. Dornates
5 August 1973	(United States) Los Angeles	Poland	0–1	Friendly	(United States Soccer Federation) T. Kibritjan
8 August 1973	(Mexico) Monterrey	Poland	1–2	Friendly	(Peruvian Football Federation) A. Yamasaki
20 September 1973	Mexico City	Chile	1–2	Friendly	(Peruvian Football Federation) A. Yamasaki
16 October 1973	Mexico City	United States	2–0	Friendly	(Mexican Football Federation) M. Dorantes
30 November 1973	(Haiti) Port-au-Prince	Guatemala	0–0	1973 CONCACAF Championship	(Canadian Soccer Association) J. Hightet
3 December 1973	(Haiti) Port-au-Prince	Honduras	1–1	1973 CONCACAF Championship	(Canadian Soccer Association) W. Winsemann
8 December 1973	(Haiti) Port-au-Prince	Netherlands Antilles	8–0	1973 CONCACAF Championship	(Costa Rican Football Federation) L. Siles
14 December 1973	(Haiti) Port-au-Prince	Trinidad and Tobago	4–0	1973 CONCACAF Championship	(Canadian Soccer Association) W. Winsemann
18 December 1973	(Haiti) Port-au-Prince	Haiti	1–0	1973 CONCACAF Championship	(United States Soccer Federation) T. Kibritjan
31 March 1974	(Brazil) Rio de Janeiro	Brazil	1–1	Friendly	(Argentine Football Association) M. Comesaña
5 September 1974	(Mexico) Monterrey	United States	3–1	Friendly	(Canadian Soccer Association) W. Winsemann
8 September 1974	(United States) Dallas	United States	1–0	Friendly	(Canadian Soccer Association) W. Winsemann
3 August 1975	(United States) Los Angeles	East Germany	0–1	Friendly	(United States Soccer Federation) H. landauer
6 August 1975	(Mexico) Monterrey	East Germany	1–0	Friendly	(Mexican Football Federation) M. Dorantes
17 August 1975	Mexico City	Costa Rica	7–0	Mexico Cup 1975	(Peruvian Football Federation) A. Yamasaki
24 August 1975	Mexico City	United States	2–0	Mexico Cup 1975	(Peruvian Football Federation) A. Yamasaki
30 August 1975	Mexico City	Argentina	1–1	Mexico Cup 1975	(Peruvian Football Federation) A. Yamasaki
20 October 1975	(Israel) Tel Aviv	Israel	1–0	Friendly	(Romanian Football Federation) P. Costache
4 June 1976	(Mexico) Guadalajara	Brazil	0–3	Friendly	(Mexican Football Federation) M. Dorantes
3 October 1976	(United States) Los Angeles	United States	0–0	1977 CONCACAF Championship qualification	(Canadian Soccer Association) Magilo
10 October 1976	(Canada) Vancouver	Canada	0–1	1977 CONCACAF Championship qualification	(United States Soccer Federation) T. Kibritjan
15 October 1976	(Mexico) Puebla	United States	3–0	1977 CONCACAF Championship qualification	(Canadian Soccer Association) W. Winsemann
27 October 1976	(Mexico) Toluca	Canada	0–0	1977 CONCACAF Championship qualification	(United States Soccer Federation) H. Landauer
1 February 1977	(Mexico) León	Yugoslavia	5–1	Friendly	(Mexican Football Federation) E. Mendoza
8 February 1977	(Mexico) Monterrey	Yugoslavia	0–1	Friendly	(Mexican Football Federation) J. Galindo
22 February 1977	(Mexico) Puebla	Hungary	1–1	Friendly	(Mexican Football Federation) M. Rubio
17 May 1977	Mexico City	Peru	1–1	Friendly	(Mexican Football Federation) J. Galindo
24 May 1977	(Mexico) Monterrey	Peru	2–1	Friendly	(Mexican Football Federation) E. Mendoza
14 June 1977	Mexico City	Germany	2–2	Friendly	(Mexican Football Federation) M. Dorantes
27 September 1977	(Mexico) Monterrey	United States	3–0	Friendly	(National Football Federation of Guatemala) M. Regalado
4 October 1977	(Mexico) Guadalajara	Foreign Team XI	3–1	Friendly	Unknown
9 October 1977	Mexico City	Haiti	4–1	1977 CONCACAF Championship	(Uruguayan Football Association) R. Barreto
12 October 1977	Mexico City	El Salvador	3–1	1977 CONCACAF Championship	(United States Soccer Federation) T. Kibritjian
15 October 1977	(Mexico) Monterrey	Suriname	8–1	1977 CONCACAF Championship	(Costa Rican Football Federation) J. Valverde
19 October 1977	(Mexico) Monterrey	Guatemala	2–1	1977 CONCACAF Championship	(Argentine Football Association) L. Pestarino
22 October 1977	(Mexico) Monterrey	Canada	3–1	1977 CONCACAF Championship	(Canadian Soccer Association) R. Moses
12 February 1978	(El Salvador) San Salvador	El Salvador	1–5	Friendly	(Salvadoran Football Federation) Roman
4 April 1978	(Mexico) Guadalajara	Bulgaria	3–0	Friendly	(United States Soccer Federation) D' Ippolito
11 April 1978	(United States) Los Angeles	Peru	0–1	Friendly	(United States Soccer Federation) T. Kibritjan
26 April 1978	(Spain) Granada	Spain	2–0	Friendly	(French Football Federation) A. Delmer
3 May 1978	(Finland) Helsinki	Finland	0–1	Friendly	(Swedish Football Association) K. Johansson
2 June 1978	(Argentina) Rosario	Tunisia	3–1	1978 FIFA World Cup	(Scottish Football Association) J. Gordon
6 June 1978	(Argentina) Córdoba	Germany	6–0	1978 FIFA World Cup	(Syrian Football Association) F. Bouzo
10 June 1978	(Argentina) Rosario	Poland	3–1	1978 FIFA World Cup	(Football Federation Islamic Republic of Iran) J. Namdar
1 November 1979	(Mexico) Monterrey	Peru	1–0	Friendly	(Mexican Football Federation) M. Ceja
20 November 1979	Mexico City	Finland	1–1	Friendly	(Mexican Football Federation) D. de la Mora
4 December 1979	(El Salvador) San Salvador	El Salvador	0–2	Friendly	(Salvadoran Football Federation) R. Reyes
18 December 1979	(Mexico) Texcoco	El Salvador	1–1	Friendly	(Mexican Football Federation) M. Dorantes

== Results 1980–1989 ==
Date	Location	Opponents	Score	Competition	Referee
22 January 1980	(Mexico) León	Czechoslovakia	1–0	Friendly	(Mexican Football Federation) M. Guevara
26 February 1980	(United States) Los Angeles	South Korea	0–1	Friendly	(United States Soccer Federation) T. Kibritjian
18 March 1980	(Honduras) Tegucigalpa	Honduras	0–1	Friendly	(National Autonomous Federation of Football of Honduras) C. M. Torres
8 April 1980	(Mexico) Toluca	Honduras	5–0	Friendly	(Mexican Football Federation) E. Codesal
15 April 1980	Guatemala City	Guatemala	2–4	Friendly	(National Football Federation of Guatemala) M. Negreros
29 April 1980	(Mexico) Toluca	Guatemala	2–2	Friendly	(Mexican Football Federation) E. Codesal
8 June 1980	(Brazil) Rio de Janeiro	Brazil	2–0	Friendly Team details: Brazil / Mexico; GK / 1 / Raul Plassmann; RB / 2 / Nelinho; CB / 3 / Amaral / / (substituted off) 80'; CB / 4 / Edinho; LB / 5 / Pedrinho / Yellow card; RM / 6 / Paulo Isidoro / / (substituted off) 46'; CM / 10 / Batista; CM / 8 / Toninho Cerezo / / (substituted off) 46'; LM / 10 / Sócrates / (c); RF / 11 / Serginho Chulapa / 68'; LF / 7 / Zé Sérgio / 47'; Substitutes: CB / 13 / Mauro Pastor / / (substituted on) 80'; RF / 21 / Eder / / (substituted on) 46'; LF / 19 / Renato Gaucho / / (substituted on) 46'; Manager: Tele Santana: GK / 1 / Pilar Reyes; CB / 14 / Mario Trejo; CB / 4 / Arturo Vázquez; CB / 3 / Alfredo Tena; LB / 5 / Ramon de la Torre; RM / 17 / Pedro Munguia / / (substituted off) 46'; CM / 8 / Guillermo Mendizábal; CM / 6 / Ricardo Castro / / (substituted off) 66'; LM / 10 / Jose Gonzalez Arzola / / (substituted off) 46'; RF / 9 / Hector Tapia / / (substituted off) 62'; LF / 11 / Hugo Sanchez / (c); Substitutes: CM / 17 / Juan Antonio Luna / / (substituted on) 46'; CM / 19 / Mario Medina / / (substituted on) 46'; LF / 18 / Agustin Manzo Ponce / / (substituted on) 66'; RF / 21 / Cristobal Ortega / / (substituted on) 62'; Manager: Raul Cardenas	(Brazilian Football Confederation) J. Wright
20 August 1980	(New Zealand) Auckland	New Zealand	4–0	Friendly	(New Zealand Football) W. Munro
24 August 1980	(Australia) Sydney	Australia	2–2	Friendly	(Football Australia) C. Bambridge
26 August 1980	(Australia) Melbourne	Australia	1–1	Friendly	(Football Australia) C. Bambridge
30 August 1980	(Fiji) Suva	Fiji	0–2	Friendly	(Fiji Football Association) H. Naicker
2 September 1980	(France) Papeete	(France national football team) Tahiti	0–1	Friendly	(France) B. Maamaua
18 October 1980	(Canada) Toronto	Canada	1–1	1981 CONCACAF Championship qualification	(Costa Rican Football Federation) S. Calderon
9 November 1980	Mexico City	United States	5–1	1981 CONCACAF Championship qualification	(Costa Rican Football Federation) Salazar
16 November 1980	Mexico City	Canada	1–1	1981 CONCACAF Championship qualification	(National Autonomous Federation of Football of Honduras) M. Torres
23 November 1980	(United States) Fort Lauderdale	United States	2–1	1981 CONCACAF Championship qualification	(National Football Federation of Guatemala) G. Regalado
20 January 1981	Mexico City	Bulgaria	1–1	Friendly	(Mexican Football Federation) M. Guevara
11 February 1981	Mexico City	South Korea	4–0	Friendly	(Mexican Football Federation) M. Vázquez
24 June 1981	Mexico City	Spain	1–3	Friendly	(Football Association of Yugoslavia) Matovinović
1 November 1981	(Honduras) Tegucigalpa	Cuba	4–0	1981 CONCACAF Championship	(Football Association of Cuba) R. Méndez
6 November 1981	(Honduras) Tegucigalpa	El Salvador	1–0	1981 CONCACAF Championship	(Brazilian Football Confederation) J de J. Aragao
11 November 1981	(Honduras) Tegucigalpa	Haiti	1–1	1981 CONCACAF Championship	(Peruvian Football Federation) P. Trucios
15 November 1981	(Honduras) Tegucigalpa	Canada	1―1	1981 CONCACAF Championship	(United States Soccer Federation) D. Socha
22 November 1981	(Honduras) Tegucigalpa	Honduras	0–0	1981 CONCACAF Championship	(United States Soccer Federation) D. Socha
15 March 1983	(Costa Rica) San José	Costa Rica	0–1	Friendly	(Costa Rican Football Federation) Monge Muñoz
22 March 1983	Mexico City	Costa Rica	1–0	Friendly	(Mexican Football Federation) F. Ramírez
5 April 1983	(United States) Los Angeles	Guatemala	2–0	Friendly	(United States Soccer Federation) A. Humphires
25 October 1983	(United States) Los Angeles	El Salvador	5–0	Friendly	(United States Soccer Federation) H. Wolmerack
22 November 1983	(Mexico) Morelia	Sweden	0–2	Friendly	(Mexican Football Federation) J. Sansone
29 November 1983	(Martinique) Fort-de-France	Martinique	4–4	Friendly	
6 December 1983	(Mexico) Irapuato	Canada	5–0	Friendly	(Mexican Football Federation) A. Márquez
24 January 1984	(Mexico) Irapuato	Venezuela	3–0	Friendly	(Mexican Football Federation) M. García
4 February 1984	(Italy) Rome	Italy	5–0	Friendly	(Portuguese Football Federation) V. Oliva
8 August 1984	(Republic of Ireland) Dublin	Republic of Ireland	0–0	Friendly	(Swiss Football Association) J. Baumann
11 August 1984	(East Germany) East Berlin	East Germany	1–1	Friendly	(Football Association of the Czech Republic) V. Christov
16 August 1984	(Finland) Helsinki	Finland	0–3	Friendly	(Football Federation of the Soviet Union) V. Kuznetsov
19 August 1984	(Soviet Union) Leningrad	Soviet Union	3–0	Friendly	(Deutscher Fußball-Verband der DDR) B. Stumpf
22 August 1984	(Sweden) Malmö	Sweden	1–1	Friendly	(Deutscher Fußball-Verband der DDR) K. Schurell
25 August 1984	(Hungary) Budapest	Hungary	0–2	Friendly	(German Football Association) Tritschler
18 September 1984	(Mexico) Monterrey	Argentina	1–1	Friendly	(United States Soccer Federation) E. Bellion
9 October 1984	(United States) Los Angeles	Colombia	1–0	1984 Columbus Cup	(United States Soccer Federation) H. Krollfeifer
11 October 1984	(United States) Los Angeles	El Salvador	1–0	1984 Columbus Cup	(United States Soccer Federation) H. Krollfeifer
17 October 1984	Mexico City	United States	2–1	Friendly	(Mexican Football Federation) E. Mendoza
25 October 1984	(Argentina) Buenos Aires	Argentina	1–1	Friendly	(Paraguayan Football Association) J. Escobar
28 October 1984	(Chile) Santiago	Chile	1–0	Friendly	(Argentine Football Association) J. Lostau
31 October 1984	(Uruguay) Montevideo	Uruguay	1–1	Friendly	(Argentine Football Association) J. Romero
11 November 1984	(Trinidad and Tobago) Port of Spain	Trinidad and Tobago	0–2	Friendly	(Trinidad and Tobago Football Association) R. Ramcharan
4 December 1984	(United States) Los Angeles	Ecuador	3–2	Friendly	(United States Soccer Federation) L. Macias
5 February 1985	(Mexico) Querétaro	Poland	5–0	Friendly	(Mexican Football Federation) J. Leanza
6 February 1985	(Mexico) Querétaro	Switzerland	1–2	Friendly	(Mexican Football Federation) E. Mendoza
26 February 1985	(Mexico) Acapulco	Finland	2–1	Friendly	(Mexican Football Federation) E. Mendoza
2 June 1985	Mexico City	Italy	1–1	1985 Mexico City Cup	(Canadian Soccer Association) J. Meachin
9 June 1985	Mexico City	England	1–0	1985 Mexico City Cup & 1985 Azteca 2000 Cup	(German Football Association) V. Roth
15 June 1985	Mexico City	Germany	2–0	1985 Azteca 2000 Cup	(The Football Association) K. Hackett
25 August 1985	(United States) Los Angeles	Chile	2–1	Friendly	(United States Soccer Federation) T. Kibritjian
27 August 1985	(United States) Los Angeles	Bulgaria	1–1	Friendly	(Football Federation Islamic Republic of Iran) M. Abuthalebi
20 September 1985	(United States) Los Angeles	Peru	0–0	Friendly	(United States Soccer Federation) E. Bellion
22 September 1985	(United States) San Jose	Peru	1–0	Friendly	(United States Soccer Federation) R. Evans
11 October 1985	(Libya) Benghazi	Libya	3–1	Friendly	(Libyan Football Federation) S. Sherif
15 October 1985	(Yemen) Sana'a	North Yemen	0–2	Friendly	(Yemen Football Association) A. Kheir
18 October 1985	(Jordan) Amman	Jordan	0–0	Friendly	(Jordan Football Association) H. Awil
20 October 1985	(Egypt) Cairo	Egypt	2–1	Friendly	(Egyptian Football Association) F. Sharif
25 October 1985	Kuwait City	Kuwait	0–0	Friendly	(Kuwait Football Association) M. Shuaib
14 November 1985	(United States) Los Angeles	Argentina	1–1	Friendly Team details: Mexico / Argentina; GK / 1 / Pablo Larios; RB / 21 / Juan Hernandez / / (substituted off) 46'; CB / 2 / Mario Trejo; CB / 3 / Rafael Amador / / (substituted off) 46'; CB / 6 / Fernando Quirarte; LB / 5 / Raul Servin; RM / 10 / Tomas Boy / (c) / 65' (pen.); CM / 8 / Carlos Muñoz; CM / 4 / Javier Aguirre; LM / 7 / Miguel España; CF / 11 / Manuel Negrete; Substitutes: CM / 9 / Carlos de los Cobos / / (substituted on) 46'; RF / 19 / Luis Flores / / (substituted on) 46'; Manager: (Socialist Federal Republic of Yugoslavia) Velibor Milutinovic: GK / 1 / Luis Alberto Islas; RB / 2 / Oscar Ruggeri; CB / 3 / Jose Luis Brown; CB / 4 / Nestor Clausen; LB / 5 / Juan Barbas; MF / 6 / Sergio Batista; MF / 7 / Miguel Angel Russo; MF / 10 / Diego Maradona / (c) / 37'; MF / 8 / Ricardo Bochini; FW / 11 / Claudio Borghi / / (substituted off) 46'; FW / 9 / Pedro Pasculli / / (substituted off) 46'; Substitutes: FW / 18 / Jorge Comas / / (substituted on) 46'; FW / 19 / Oscar Dertycia / / (substituted on) 46'; Manager: Carlos Bilardo	(United States Soccer Federation) E. Bellion
17 November 1985	(Mexico) Puebla	Argentina	1–1	Friendly	(Canadian Soccer Association) J. Mechain
3 December 1985	(United States) Los Angeles	South Korea	2–1	Friendly	(United States Soccer Federation) R. Evans
7 December 1985	Mexico City	Algeria	2–0	Mexico Cup 1985	(Mexican Football Federation) E. Mendoza Guillén
10 December 1985	(Mexico) Guadalajara	South Korea	2–1	Mexico Cup 1985	(Mexican Football Federation) E. Codesal
14 December 1985	(Mexico) Toluca	Hungary	2–0	Mexico Cup 1985	(Mexican Football Federation) E. Codesal
15 February 1986	(United States) San Jose	East Germany	1–2	Friendly	(United States Soccer Federation) R. Evans
19 February 1986	Mexico City	Soviet Union	1–0	Friendly	(Mexican Football Federation) M. Dorantes
6 March 1986	(United States) Los Angeles	Denmark	1–1	Friendly	(United States Soccer Federation) V. Mauro
13 April 1986	(United States) Los Angeles	Uruguay	1–0	Friendly	(United States Soccer Federation) A. Bratsis
27 April 1986	Mexico City	Canada	3–0	Friendly	(Mexican Football Federation) E. Mendoza
17 May 1986	(United States) Los Angeles	England	0–3	Friendly Team details: Mexico / England; GK / 1 / Pablo Larios; RB / 2 / Mario Trejo; CB / 4 / Armando Manzo / / (substituted off) 46'; CB / 14 / Felix Cruz; LB / 17 / Raúl Servín; RM / 16 / Carlos Muñoz / (Captain); CM / 7 / Miguel España; LM / 13 / Javier Aguirre; RF / 15 / Luis Flores; CF / 11 / Carlos Hermosillo / / (substituted off) 46'; LF / 22 / Manuel Negrete; Substitutes: DF / 3 / Fernando Quirarte / / (substituted on) 46'; FW / 5 / Francisco Javier Cruz / / (substituted on) 46'; MF / 6 / Carlos de los Cobos; MF / 8 / Alejandro Domínguez; MF / 10 / Tomás Boy; GK / 12 / Ignacio Rodríguez; DF / 18 / Rafael Amador; MF / 19 / Javier Hernández; GK / 20 / Olaf Heredia; FW / 21 / Cristóbal Ortega; Manager: (Socialist Federal Republic of Yugoslavia) Velibor Milutinovic: GK / 1 / Peter Shilton; RB / 12 / Viv Anderson; CB / 14 / Terry Fenwick; CB / 6 / Terry Butcher; LB / 3 / Kenny Sansom; RM / 7 / Bryan Robson / (c) 71' / (substituted off) 71'; CM / 4 / Glenn Hoddle; CM / 8 / Ray Wilkins / / (substituted off) 80'; LM / 11 / Chris Waddle / / (substituted off) 71'; RF / 9 / Mark Hateley / 22', 30' / (substituted off) 71'; LF / 20 / Peter Beardsley / 37'; Substitutes: DF / 2 / Gary M. Stevens; DF / 5 / Alvin Martin; FW / 10 / Gary Lineker; GK / 13 / Chris Woods; DF / 15 / Gary A. Stevens / / (substituted on) 71'; MF / 16 / Peter Reid; MF / 17 / Trevor Steven / / (substituted on) 80'; MF / 18 / Steve Hodge; LF / 19 / John Barnes / / (substituted on) 71'; RF / 21 / Kerry Dixon / / (substituted on) 71'; GK / 22 / Gary Bailey; Manager: Bobby Robson	(United States Soccer Federation) V. Mauro
3 June 1986	Mexico City	Belgium	2–1	1986 FIFA World Cup	(Argentine Football Association) C. Espósito
7 June 1986	Mexico City	Paraguay	1–1	1986 FIFA World Cup	(The Football Association) G. Cortney
11 June 1986	Mexico City	Iraq	1–0	1986 FIFA World Cup	(Football Association of Yugoslavia) Petrović
15 June 1986	Mexico City	Bulgaria	2–0	1986 FIFA World Cup	(Brazilian Football Confederation) R. Filho
21 June 1986	(Mexico) Monterrey	Germany	0–0 (1–4 (p))	1986 FIFA World Cup	(Colombian Football Federation) J Díaz
13 January 1987	(United States) Los Angeles	El Salvador	3–1	Friendly	(United States Soccer Federation) S. Di Placido
7 March 1987	(Mexico) León	China	3–2	Friendly	(Mexican Football Federation) E. Garza
6 October 1987	(Mexico) Toluca	Canada	4–0	Friendly	(Mexican Football Federation) A. Gasso
13 January 1988	(Honduras) San Pedro Sula	Honduras	0–1	Friendly	(National Autonomous Federation of Football of Honduras) G. Tejada
3 February 1988	(Mexico) Toluca	Guatemala	2–1	1988 Olympic Qualifynig	(Trinidad and Tobago Football Association) L. Sirjuesingh
14 February 1988	Guatemala City	Guatemala	0–3	1988 Olympic Qualifying	(Football Association of Cuba) O. Ramos
28 March 1988	Mexico City	El Salvador	8–0	Friendly	(Paraguayan Football Association) B. Nuñez
12 April 1988	(Canada) Victoria	Canada	1–0	Friendly	(Canadian Soccer Association) J. Meachin
14 April 1988	(Canada) Vancouver	Canada	1–0	Friendly	(Canadian Soccer Association) D. Brunner
26 April 1988	(Mexico) Ciudad Victoria	Honduras	4–1	Friendly	(Mexican Football Federation) F. Ramirez
14 February 1989	(Mexico) Puebla	Poland	3–1	Friendly	(Mexican Football Federation) F. Ramirez
21 February 1989	(United States) Los Angeles	Guatemala	2–1	1989 Friendship Cup	(United States Soccer Federation) V. Mauro
23 February 1989	(United States) Los Angeles	El Salvador	2–0	1989 Friendship Cup	(United States Soccer Federation) V. Mauro
10 August 1989	(United States) Los Angeles	South Korea	4–2	1989 Los Angeles Cup	(United States Soccer Federation) J. Majid

== Results 1990–1999 ==
=== 1990 ===
Date	Location	Opponents	Score	Competition	Referee
17 January 1990	(United States) Los Angeles	Argentina	2–0	Friendly	(United States Soccer Federation) V. Mauro
20 March 1990	(United States) Los Angeles	Uruguay	2–1	Friendly	(United States Soccer Federation) J. Majid
17 April 1990	(United States) Los Angeles	Colombia	2–0	Friendly	(United States Soccer Federation) E. Cummings
10 May 1990	(Canada) Vancouver	United States	1–0	1990 North American Nations Cup	(Canadian Soccer Association) R. Allen
13 May 1990	(Canada) Burnaby	Canada	1–2	1990 North American Nations Cup	(Canadian Soccer Association) E. Cummings
2 June 1990	(Belgium) Brussels	Belgium	0–3	Friendly Team details: Belgium / Mexico; GK / 1 / Michel Preud'homme; RB / 2 / Eric Gerets / (c) / (substituted off) 84'; CB / 13 / Georges Grün / / (substituted off) 46'; CB / 7 / Stéphane Demol / / (substituted off) 46'; LB / 16 / Michel De Wolf; RM / 5 / Bruno Versavel / (yellow card) , (goal) 50'; CM / 6 / Marc Emmers; CM / 8 / Franky Van der Elst; LM / 10 / Enzo Scifo; RF / 9 / Marc Degryse / 36', 38'; LF / 19 / Marc Van Der Linden / / (substituted off) 58'; Substitutions: CB / 4 / Lei Clijsters / / (substituted on) 46'; CB / 3 / Philippe Albert / / (substituted on) 46'; CM / 21 / Marc Wilmots / / (substituted on) 58'; CM / RB / Pascal Plovie / / (substituted on) 84'; Manager: Guy Thys: GK / 1 / Pablo Larios; RB / 2 / Juan Hernandez; CB / 3 / Octavio Becerril; CB / 4 / Roberto Ruiz Esparza; LB / 5 / Jose Enrique Vaca / / (substituted off) 72'; RM / 7 / Victor Medina / / (substituted off) 52'; CM / 8 / Marcelino Bernal; CM / 6 / Carlos Muñoz / (c); LM / 11 / Gonzalo Farfan / / (substituted off) 67'; CF / 9 / Ricardo Pelaez; LF / 17 / Luis Roberto Alves; Substitutions: RF / 19 / Luis Flores / / (substituted on) 52'; LM / 21 / Missael Espinoza / / (substituted on) 67'; Manager: Ignacio Trelles	(Danish Football Association) J. Damgaard
12 December 1990	(United States) Los Angeles	Brazil	0–0	Friendly Team details: Mexico / Brazil; GK / 1 / Pablo Larios; RB / 2 / Juan Hernandez; CB / 3 / Victor Rodriguez; CB / 4 / Roberto Ruiz Esparza; LB / 5 / Héctor Esparza / / (substituted off) 72'; RM / 8 / Marcelino Bernal; CM / 6 / Carlos Muñoz / (c); LM / 7 / Miguel España / / (substituted off) 66'; RF / 10 / Luis Flores / / (substituted off) 46'; CF / 9 / Ricardo Pelaez; LF / 11 / Luis Roberto Alves; Substitutions: RM / 20 / Jose Manuel de la Torre / / (substituted on) 66'; CM / 21 / Gonzalo Farfán / / (substituted on) 71'; LF / 15 / Francisco Javier Cruz / / (substituted on) 76'; Manager: Manuel Lapuente: GK / 1 / Sérgio; RB / 2 / Gil Baiano / / (substituted off) 84'; CB / 3 / Paulao / / (substituted off) 34'; CB / 4 / Adilson Batista; LB / 6 / Lira / (c); RM / 8 / Edu / Yellow card; CM / 5 / Moacir; CM / 9 / Marquinhos / / (substituted off) 84'; LM / 11 / Joao Santos; RF / 7 / Careca Bianchezi / / (substituted off) 76'; LF / 10 / Mazinho / 88'; Substitutions: CB / 13 / Marcio Santos / / (substituted on) 34'; RF / 17 / Almir / / (substituted on) 76'; CM / 21 / Gerson / / (substituted on) 84'; CM / 18 / Odair / / (substituted on) 84'; Manager: Falcão	(United States Soccer Federation) J. Majid

=== 1991 ===
Date	Location	Opponents	Score	Competition	Referee
29 January 1991	(Mexico) León	Colombia	0–0 (5–4 (p))	Friendly Team details: Mexico / Colombia; GK / 12 / Hugo Pineda / / (substituted off) 46'; RB / 2 / Juan Hernández; CB / 3 / Octavio Becerril; CB / 4 / Roberto Ruiz Esparza; LB / 18 / Guillermo Muñoz; RM / 7 / José Luis González China / / (substituted off) 46'; CM / 5 / Miguel España; CM / 6 / Carlos Muñoz / (c); LM / 8 / Gonzalo Farfán / / (substituted off) 64'; RF / 9 / Ricardo Pelaez; LF / 17 / Luis Roberto Alves / / (substituted off) 46'; Substitutes: GK / 1 / Pablo Larios / / (substituted on) 46'; RM / 16 / Humberto Romero / / (substituted on) 46'; CM / 21 / Alfonso Sosa / / (substituted on) 64'; RF / 11 / Sergio Pacheco / / (substituted on) 68'; Manuel Lapuente: GK / 1 / René Higuita; RB / 4 / Andrés Escobar; CB / 3 / Alexis Mendoza; CB / 15 / Luis Carlos Perea; LB / 18 / Gildardo Gomez; RM / 6 / Eduardo Pimentel; CM / 10 / Jose Ricardo Perez; CM / 19 / Alex Escobar / (substituted off) 58'; LM / 10 / Alexis García; CF / 11 / Sergio Angulo; CF / 9 / Anthony de Ávila; Substitutes: MF / 16 / Freddy Rincon / (substituted on) 58'; Manager: Luis Augusto García	(Canadian Soccer Association) R. Sawtell
12 March 1991	(United States) Los Angeles	United States	2–2	1991 North American Nations Cup	(National Football Federation of Guatemala) M. López
13 March 1991	(Argentina) Buenos Aires	Argentina	0–0	Friendly Team details: Argentina / Mexico; GK / 1 / Sergio Goycochea; RB / 16 / Fabián Basualdo; CB / 17 / Oscar Ruggeri / (c); CB / 4 / Fernando Gamboa; LB / 21 / Carlos Enrique; RM / 20 / Leonardo Astrada; CM / 7 / Dario Franco; CM / 19 / Victor Ferreyra; LM / 14 / Sergio Berti / / (substituted on) 66'; RF / 10 / David Bisconti / / (substituted off) 62'; LF / 11 / Ramon Medina Bello; Substitutes: LM / 8 / Gustavo Zapata / / (substituted on) 62'; RF / 19 / Carlos Alfaro Moreno / / (substituted on) 66'; Manager: Alfio Basile: GK / 1 / Pablo Larios; CB / 3 / Efraín Herrera; CB / 4 / Octavio Becerril; LB / 5 / Guillermo Muñoz; RM / 2 / Jorge Rodriguez / (substituted off) 51'; CM / 16 / Marcelino Bernal; CM / 5 / Miguel España; CM / 6 / Carlos Muñoz (c); LM / 10 / Benjamin Galindo / (substituted off) 51'; RF / 27 / Francisco Javier Cruz / (substituted on) 57'; LF / 9 / Ricardo Pelaez; Substitutes: RM / 8 / José Manuel de la Torre / (substituted off) 51'; LF / 11 / Francisco Uribe / (substituted on) 57'; Manager: Manuel Lapuente	(Argentine Football Association) R. Calabria
14 March 1991	(United States) Los Angeles	Canada	3–0	1991 North American Nations Cup	(Salvadoran Football Federation) R. Martínez
9 April 1991	(Mexico) Veracruz	Chile	1–0	Friendly Team details: GK / 1 / Hugo Pineda; RB / 2 / Juan Hernandez; CB / 15 / Octavio Becerril; CB / 13 / Pedro Osorio; LB / 5 / Guillermo Muñoz; RM / 7 / Missael Espinoza / 34' / (substituted off) 46'; CM / 6 / Carlos Muñoz / (c); CM / 8 / Gonzalo Farfán / / (substituted off) 58'; LM / 10 / Benjamin Galindo / / (substituted off) 81'; RF / 27 / Carlos Hermosillo; LF / 17 / Luis Roberto Alves / Yellow card / (substituted off) 46'; Substitutions: LF / 21 / Francisco Javier Cruz / / (substituted on) 46'; LM / 11 / José Juan Morales / / (substituted on) 46'; CM / 20 / Alfonso Sosa / / (substituted on) 58'; RB / 22 / Carlos Barra / / (substituted on) 81'; Manager: Manuel Lapuente: GK / 1 / Patricio Toledo; RB / 4 / Andrés Romero / Yellow card; CB / 2 / Luis Abarca / (c); CB / 3 / Ronald Fuentes; LB / 6 / Miguel Ponce / Yellow card / (substituted off) 73'; RM / 7 / Luis Musrri / Yellow card / (substituted off) 45'; CM / 8 / Nelson Parraguez; CM / 5 / Fabián Estay / / (substituted off) 66'; LM / 10 / Juan Carlos Vera / Yellow card / (substituted off) 75'; RF / 11 / Luis Guarda; LF / 9 / Marcelo Vega / 30', (yellow card) / (substituted off) 66'; Substitutions: CB / 15 / Rodrigo Gómez / / (substituted on) 45'; CM / 16 / Fernando Cornejo / / (substituted on) 66'; LM / 18 / Christian Bravo / / (substituted on) 66'; LM / 18 / Fabián Guevara / / (substituted on) 73'; LM / 18 / José Luis Sierra / / (substituted on) 75'; Manager: Arturo Salah	(Canadian Soccer Association) D. Brummitt
17 April 1991	(Costa Rica) San José	Costa Rica	0–0	Friendly Team details: GK / 1 / Alberto Aguilar / / (substituted off) 46'; RB / 2 / Antonio Gonzalez Hernandez; CB / 3 / Pedro Osorio / / (red card) 37'; CB / 4 / Abraham Nava; LB / 5 / Rafael Gutierrez Aldaco; RM / 10 / Pedro Duana / / (substituted off) 60'; CM / 6 / Carlos Barra / (c) / (substituted off) 74'; CM / 8 / Garcia Aspe / / (substituted off) 60'; LM / 7 / Alberto Garcia; RF / 9 / Luis Garcia / / (substituted off) 60'; LF / 11 / Sergio Almaguer; Substitutes: GK / 12 / Ricardo Martinez / / (substituted on) 46'; CB / 4 / Juan de Dios Ramirez Perales / / (substituted on) 60'; RM / 8 / Porfirio Jimenez / / (substituted on) 60'; CM / 13 / Victor Escalera / / (substituted on) 60'; Manager: Ignacio Trelles: GK / 1 / Hermidio Barrantes; RB / 3 / Róger Flores (c); CB / 6 / Héctor Marchena; CB / 15 / Edwin Salazar; LB / 2 / Sandro Alfaro / (substituted off) 60'; MF / 5 / Róger Gómez; MF / 8 / Carlos Velásquez / (substituted on) 19'; MF / 16 / Floyd Guthrie; MF / 26 / Luis Diego Arnaez / (substituted off) 60'; FW / 11 / Leonidas Flores / (substituted off) 60'; FW / 14 / Norman Gómez; Substitutes: DF / 20 / Mauricio Montero / (substituted on) 60'; MF / 37 / Javier Wanchope / (substituted on) 60'; FW / 7 / Claudio Jara / (substituted on) 60'; GK / 18 / Pedro Cubillo; Manager: Rolando Villalobos	(Costa Rican Football Federation) J. Ortíz
7 May 1991	(United States) Los Angeles	Uruguay	0–2	Friendly Team details: GK / 12 / Hugo Pineda; RB / 2 / Juan Hernandez; CB / 3 / Abraham Nava; CB / 4 / Roberto Ruiz Esparza; LB / 5 / Héctor Esparza / / (substituted off) 72'; RM / 10 / José Manuel de la Torre / / (substituted off) 69'; CM / 6 / Miguel España / (c); CM / 8 / Marcelino Bernal; LM / 7 / Alberto García Aspe / / (substituted off) 46'; RF / 9 / Ricardo Pelaez / / (substituted off) 65'; LF / 17 / Luis Roberto Alves; Substitutions: LM / 15 / Missael Espinoza / / (substituted on) 46'; RF / 27 / Carlos Hermosillo / / (substituted on) 65'; CM / 18 / Gonzalo Farfán / / (substituted on) 69'; LB / 13 / Guillermo Muñoz / / (substituted on) 72'; Manager: Manuel Lapuente: GK / 1 / Fernando Alvez; RB / 4 / Guillermo Sanguinetti; CB / 2 / Daniel Sanchez / Yellow card; CB / 3 / Eber Moas / (c); LB / 6 / Paolo Montero; RM / 10 / Henry Lopez Baez; CM / 8 / César Silvera; CM / 5 / Ruben Pereira / Yellow card; LM / 11 / Víctor López / 60' / (substituted off) 90'; RF / 7 / Sergio Martínez; LF / 9 / Gustavo Ferreyra / 88'; Substitutions: CB / 17 / Álvaro Gutiérrez / / (substituted on) 90'; Manager: Pedro Cubilla	(United States Soccer Federation) Angeles
28 June 1991	(United States) Los Angeles	Jamaica	4–1	1991 Gold Cup	(Antigua and Barbuda Football Association) A. Success
30 June 1991	(United States) Los Angeles	Canada	3–1	1991 Gold Cup	(Costa Rican Football Federation) R. Gutierrez
3 July 1991	(United States) Los Angeles	Honduras	1–1	1991 Gold Cup	(United States Soccer Federation) J. Majid
5 July 1991	(United States) Los Angeles	United States	0–2	1991 Gold Cup	(Salvadoran Football Federation) J. Ortiz
7 July 1991	(United States) Los Angeles	Costa Rica	2–0	1991 Gold Cup	(Trinidad and Tobago Football Association) E. Forbes
20 November 1991	(Mexico) Veracruz	Uruguay	1–1	Friendly Team details: Mexico / Uruguay; GK / 17 / Jorge Campos; RB / 2 / Juan Hernandez; CB / 15 / Octavio Becerril; CB / 13 / Javier Aguirre / (c), (yellow card); LB / 14 / Guillermo Muñoz; RM / 7 / Pedro Duana / / (substituted off) 58'; CM / 6 / Miguel España / Yellow card; CM / 5 / Gonzalo Farfán; LM / 21 / Alberto Garcia Martinez / Yellow card / (substituted off) 58'; RF / 17 / Carlos Hermosillo; LF / 9 / Luis Antonio Valdez; Substitutions: CM / 21 / Jaime Ordiales / / (substituted on) 58'; RM / 17 / Porfirio Jimenez / 70' / (substituted on) 58'; Manager: (Argentina) Cesar Luis Menotti: GK / 1 / Fernando Alvez; RB / 4 / Cesilio de los Santos / Yellow card; CB / 2 / Daniel Revelez / (c); CB / 3 / Eber Moas; LB / 6 / Rubén dos Santos; RM / 7 / Marcelo Fracchia / Yellow card; CM / 8 / Héctor Morán; CM / 5 / Santiago Ostolaza; LM / 10 / William Castro / Yellow card / (substituted off) 76'; RF / 11 / William Gutierrez / / (substituted off) 76'; LF / 9 / Gabriel Cedrés / 30', (yellow card) / (substituted off) 76'; Substitutions: CB / 15 / Álvaro Gutiérrez / / (substituted on) 76'; CM / 16 / Marcelo Tejera / / (substituted on) 76'; LM / 18 / Gustavo Ferreyra / / (substituted on) 76'; Manager: Luis Cubilla	(United States Soccer Federation) A. Bratsis
27 November 1991	(United States) Los Angeles	Costa Rica	1–1	Friendly Team details: GK / 1 / Jorge Campos; RB / 2 / Juan Hernández; CB / 3 / Octavio Becerril; CB / 4 / Javier Aguirre / (c); LB / 5 / Guillermo Muñoz; RM / 18 / Pedro Duana / / (substituted off) 46'; CM / 6 / Miguel España / / (substituted off) 65'; CM / 11 / Gonzalo Farfán / / (substituted off) 65'; LM / 7 / Alberto Garcia / / 2'; RF / 27 / Carlos Hermosillo / / (substituted off) 58'; LF / 9 / Luis Antonio Valdez; Substitutes: RM / 8 / José Manuel de la Torre / / (substituted on) 46'; RF / 10 / Luis García / / (substituted on) 58'; CM / 17 / Porfirio Jimenez / / (substituted on) 65'; CM / 15 / Jaime Ordiales / / (substituted on) 65'; Manager: (Argentina) Cesar Luis Menotti: GK / 1 / Jorge Arturo Hidalgo; DF / 6 / Héctor Marchena; DF / 4 / Rónald González / (yellow card) 31'; DF / 20 / Mauricio Montero; DF / 13 / Ricardo Chacón; RM / 2 / Vladimir Quesada; MF / 17 / Juan Carlos Arguedas / / (substituted off) 79'; MF / 5 / Róger Gómez / 44' / (substituted off) 85'; MF / 5 / Joaquin Guillen; FW / 14 / Norman Gómez / (c) / / (substituted on) 67'; FW / 7 / Claudio Jara; Substitutes: DF / 3 / Randall Row / / (substituted on) 79'; MF / 12 / Sandro Alfaro / / (substituted on) 67'; MF / 10 / Richard Smith / / (substituted off) 85'; Manager: Rolando Villalobos	(United States Soccer Federation) J. Majid
4 December 1991	(Mexico) León	Hungary	3–0	Friendly Team details: Mexico / Hungary; GK / 1 / Jorge Campos; RB / 4 / Raul Gutierrez; CB / 2 / Javier Aguirre / (c); CB / 3 / Juan de Dios Ramirez Perales; LB / 5 / Paco Ramirez; RM / 8 / José Manuel de la Torre / 80' (pen.); CM / 6 / Miguel España; CM / 11 / Gonzalo Farfán; LM / 10 / Alberto Garcia / 55'; RF / 9 / Luis Garcia / 75'; LF / 7 / Luis Valdez / / (substituted off) 71'; Substitutes: LM / 17 / Ramón Ramirez / / (substituted on) 71'; Manager: (Argentina) Cesar Luis Menotti: GK / 1 / István Brockhauser; RB / 2 / Pál Urbán; CB / 5 / József Nagy / (substituted off) 46'; LB / 6 / Tibor Simon; RM / 7 / István Pisont / (substituted off) 61'; CM / 10 / Zoltán Váczi / (substituted off) 75'; CM / 11 / Péter Lipcsei; CM / 15 / György Bognár; LM / 16 / József Keller; RF / 12 / Dénes Eszenyi / (substituted off) 77'; LF / 9 / Tibor Balog / (substituted off) 61'; Substitutes: FW / 3 / Sándor Zombori / (substituted on) 46'; FW / 4 / Béla Illés / (substituted on) 61'; LM / 13 / Ferenc Orosz / (substituted on) 61'; CM / 8 / Ferenc Hámori / (substituted on) 77'; Manager: Robert Glazer	(Paraguayan Football Association) B. Nuñez

=== 1992 ===
Date	Location	Opponents	Score	Competition	Referee
8 March 1992	Mexico City	CIS	4–0	Friendly Team details: Mexico / CIS; GK / 1 / Jorge Campos; RB / 4 / Raul Gutierrez; CB / 2 / Javier Aguirre / (c), 7'; CB / 3 / Juan de Dios Ramirez Perales / / Substituted off; LB / 5 / Paco Ramirez; RM / 8 / José Manuel de la Torre / 57' (pen.) / Substituted off; CM / 6 / Miguel España; CM / 11 / Gonzalo Farfán / / Substituted off; LM / 10 / Alberto Garcia Aspe; RF / 9 / Luis Garcia; LF / 7 / Luis Valdez / 37' / Substituted off; Substitutes: CM / 16 / Martín Vásquez / / Substituted on; RM / 15 / Marcelino Bernal / 85' / Substituted on; LM / 11 / Missael Espinoza / / Substituted on; CM / 22 / Jaime Ordiales / / Substituted on; Manager: (Argentina) Cesar Luis Menotti: GK / 1 / Dmitri Kharine; RB / 2 / Dmitri Alenichev; CB / 5 / Aleksei Arifullin / Substituted off; LB / 6 / Dmitri Gorkov; RM / 7 / Viktor Losev / Substituted off; CM / 10 / Andriy Nikitin / Substituted off; CM / 11 / Ravil Sabitov; CM / 15 / Oleg Samatov; LM / 16 / Oleg Sergeyev; RF / 12 / Aleksandr Smirnov / Substituted off; LF / 9 / Igor Terekhov / Substituted off; Substitutes: FW / 3 / Alexey Kuzmichev / Substituted on; FW / 4 / Aleksandr Rychkov / Substituted on; LM / 13 / Aleksandr Filimonov / Substituted on; CM / 8 / Andrei Fedin / Substituted on; Manager: Anatoliy Byshovets	(Mexican Football Federation) Pardo Borja
11 March 1992	(Mexico) Tampico	CIS	1–1	Friendly Team details: GK / 1 / Jorge Campos; RB / 4 / Raul Gutierrez; CB / 2 / Javier Aguirre / (c); CB / 3 / Juan de Dios Ramirez Perales / Red card; LB / 5 / Martín Vásquez; RM / 8 / José Manuel de la Torre; CM / 6 / Miguel España; CM / 11 / Gonzalo Farfán; LM / 10 / Alberto Garcia Aspe; RF / 9 / Luis Garcia / 5'; LF / 7 / Luis Valdez; Substitutes: LM / 11 / Missael Espinoza; CM / 22 / Jaime Ordiales; Manager: (Argentina) Cesar Luis Menotti: GK / 1 / Dmitri Kharine; RB / 2 / Dmitri Alenichev; CB / 5 / Aleksei Arifullin; LB / 6 / Dmitri Gorkov; RM / 7 / Viktor Losev; CM / 10 / Sergei Podpaly / Red card; CM / 11 / Ravil Sabitov; CM / 15 / Oleg Samatov / Red card; LM / 16 / Oleg Sergeyev; RF / 12 / Aleksandr Smirnov / 59'; LF / 9 / Igor Terekhov; Substitutes: FW / 3 / Alexey Kuzmichev; FW / 4 / Aleksandr Rychkov; LM / 13 / Aleksandr Filimonov; CM / 8 / Andrei Fedin; Manager: Anatoliy Byshovets	(Mexican Football Federation) M. Salas
26 July 1992	(El Salvador) San Salvador	El Salvador	2–1	Friendly Team details: GK / 1 / Carlos Rivera; RB / 2 / Miguel Estrada; CB / 3 / Giovanni Trigueros; CB / 4 / Mario Mayén Meza; CB / 6 / Leonel Carcamo / / (substituted off) 65'; LB / 5 / Jorge Morán / / (substituted off) 68'; RM / 7 / Carlos Castro / (red card) 38'; CM / 8 / Milton Meléndez / / (substituted off) 24'; LM / 11 / Mauricio Cienfuegos; CF / 9 / Julio Palacios / / (substituted off) 68'; LF / 10 / Mágico González; Substitutes: LM / 21 / Oscar Ulloa / 73' / (substituted on) 24'; CM / 16 / Fredy Orellana / / (substituted on) 65'; CM / 16 / Salvador Coreas / / (substituted on) 65'; CM / 16 / Jorge Abrego / / (substituted on) 68'; Manager: (Uruguay) Anibal Ruiz: GK / 1 / Jorge Campos; RB / 2 / Juan Hernández; CB / 5 / Paco Ramírez / / (red card) 38'; CB / 4 / Ignacio Ambriz; LB / 18 / Guillermo Muñoz; RM / 8 / José Manuel de la Torre / / (substituted off) 75'; CM / 16 / Alberto Garcia Aspe; CM / 6 / Miguel España; RF / 10 / Octavio Mora / / (substituted off) 46'; CF / 27 / Carlos Hermosillo / / (substituted off) 68'; LF / 9 / Luis Antonio Valdez / / (substituted off) 46'; Substitutes: CB / 2 / Claudio Suarez / / (substituted on) 46'; LF / 19 / Francisco Uribe / 49', 65' / (substituted on) 46'; RF / 21 / Daniel Guzman / / (substituted on) 68'; LM / 7 / Alberto Coyote / / (substituted on) 75'; Manager: (Argentina) César Luis Menotti	(Salvadoran Football Federation) J. Ortiz
31 July 1992	(United States) Los Angeles	Brazil	0–5	Friendly Team details: Mexico / Brazil; GK / 1 / Jorge Campos; RB / 2 / Juan Hernández; CB / 4 / Ignacio Ambriz; CB / 14 / Juan de Dios Ramirez Perales; LB / 5 / Guillermo Muñoz; RM / 8 / José Manuel de la Torre / (substituted off) 63'; CM / 6 / Miguel España (c); LM / 11 / Luis Valdez / (substituted off) 63'; RF / 10 / Octavio Mora; CF / 17 / Carlos Hermosillo / (substituted off) 63'; LF / 27 / Luis Garcia; Substitutes: RM / 3 / Marcelino Bernal / (substituted on) 63'; LF / 12 / Daniel Guzman / (substituted on) 63'; CF / 13 / Francisco Uribe / (substituted on) 63'; Manager: (Argentina) Cesar Luis Menotti: GK / 1 / Carlos; RB / 2 / Winck / Yellow card; CB / 5 / Ronaldao / (yellow card) 52' / (substituted off) 82'; CB / 6 / Antonio Carlos; LB / 7 / Roberto Carlos; RM / 10 / Raí / / (substituted off) 75'; CM / 11 / Mauro Silva; CM / 16 / Júnior / (yellow card) , (red card); LM / 15 / Zinho / 39' / (substituted off) 62'; RF / 12 / Bebeto / 23', 34' / (substituted off) 62' / Yellow card; LF / 9 / Renato Gaucho / 25' / (substituted off) 63'; Substitutes: FW / 3 / Edmundo / / (substituted on) 62'; FW / 4 / Paulo Sérgio / 62' / (substituted on) 62'; CM / 8 / Cesar Sampaio / / (substituted on) 63'; LM / 13 / Palhinha / / (substituted on) 75'; CB / 14 / Válber / / (substituted on) 82'; Manager: Carlos Alberto Parreira	(United States Soccer Federation) J. Majid
2 August 1992	(United States) Los Angeles	Colombia	0–0	Friendly Team details: Mexico / Colombia; GK / 1 / Jorge Campos; RB / 2 / Juan Hernández; CB / 3 / Claudio Suárez; CB / 5 / Paco Ramírez / / (substituted off) 67'; LB / 18 / Guillermo Muñoz; RM / 8 / José Manuel de la Torre / / (substituted off) 46'; CM / 6 / Miguel España / (c); CM / 4 / Ignacio Ambriz; LM / 7 / Alberto García Aspe / / (substituted off) 46'; RF / 17 / Carlos Hermosillo; LF / 9 / Luis Antonio Valdez / / (substituted off) 46'; Substitutes: RM / 15 / Marcelino Bernal / / (substituted on) 46'; LM / 12 / Missael Espinoza / / (substituted on) 46'; LF / 11 / Francisco Uribe / / (substituted on) 46'; CM / 15 / Alberto Coyote / / (substituted on) 67'; (Argentina) Cesar Luis Menotti: GK / 1 / Eddy Villarraga; RB / 4 / Andrés Escobar / (substituted off) 80'; CB / 3 / Alexis Mendoza; CB / 15 / Luis Carlos Perea; LB / 18 / Luis Antonio Moreno; RM / 6 / Wilson Pérez; CM / 10 / Wílmer Cabrera; CM / 19 / Freddy Rincón; LM / 10 / Carlos Valderrama; CF / 11 / Adolfo Valencia; CF / 9 / Anthony de Ávila; Substitutes: MF / 16 / Miguel Angel Guerrero / (substituted on) 80'; Manager: Humberto Ortiz	(United States Soccer Federation) R. Dominguez
16 August 1992	(Russia) Moscow	Russia	0–2	Friendly Team details: Russia / Mexico; GK / 1 / Stanislav Cherchesov; RB / 4 / Dmitri Popov / 66'; CB / 6 / Viktor Onopko; CB / 5 / Sergei Kolotovkin / (yellow card) 78' / (substituted off) 85'; LB / 2 / Dmitri Khlestov; RM / 8 / Valeri Karpin / 61' (pen.); CM / 3 / Vassily Kulkov / (c) / (substituted off) 46'; CM / 9 / Igor Lediakov / / (substituted off) 46'; LM / 7 / Omari Tetradze / / (substituted off) 85'; RF / 11 / Dmitri Radchenko; LF / 10 / Yuri Matveev / / (substituted off) 80'; Substitutes: CM / 14 / Andrey Kobelev / (substituted on) 46' (yellow card) 52' / (substituted off) 76'; LM / 18 / Vladislav Lemish / / (substituted on) 80'; CF / 13 / Vladimir Beschastnykh / / (substituted on) 63'; GK / 12 / Valeriy Shantalosov; CB / 17 / Andrey Ivanov / / (substituted on) 76'; CB / 15 / Andrey Chernyshov / / (substituted on) 85'; CM / 16 / Sergey Podpaliy / / (substituted on) 85'; Manager: Pavel Sadyrin: GK / 1 / Jorge Campos; RB / 4 / Juan Hernández; CB / 2 / Claudio Suárez / (yellow card) 61'; CB / 6 / Ignacio Ambriz; LB / 3 / Guillermo Muñoz; RM / 8 / José Manuel de la Torre; CM / 5 / Miguel España / (c); CM / 11 / Gonzalo Farfan / (yellow card) 14' / (substituted off) 79'; LM / 10 / Alberto García Aspe / / (substituted off) 67'; RF / 17 / Carlos Hermosillo / (red card) 72'; LF / 9 / Francisco Uribe; Substitutes: LB / 21 / Raúl Gutierrez; CB / 12 / Paco Ramirez; LM / 7 / Missael Espinoza / / (substituted on) 79'; CM / 16 / Alberto Coyote / / (substituted on) 67'; CB / 22 / Roberto Ruiz Esparza; Manager: (Argentina) Cesar Luis Menotti	(Football Federation of Belarus) V. Zhuk
19 August 1992	(Bulgaria) Sofia	Bulgaria	1–1	Friendly Team details: Bulgaria / Mexico; GK / 1 / Borislav Mihaylov (c); RB / 2 / Nikolay Iliev; CB / 5 / Petar Hubchev / (substituted off) 46'; CB / 13 / Zapryan Rakov; LB / 16 / Tsanko Tsvetanov; CM / 9 / Zlatko Yankov; AM / 11 / Georgi Yordanov / (substituted off) 67'; CM / 20 / Krasimir Balakov; RF / 7 / Emil Kostadinov / (substituted off) 46'; CF / 10 / Nasko Sirakov / (substituted off) 46'; LF / 8 / Hristo Stoichkov / 37' / (penalty missed) 68' (substituted off) 69'; Substitutions: DF / 14 / Ivaylo Iordanov / / (substituted on) 46'; FW / 11 / Ilyan Kiriakov / / (substituted on) 46'; MF / 27 / Bozhidar Iskrenov / / (substituted on) 46'; MF / 23 / Kyril Metkov / / (substituted on) 67'; FW / 9 / Ilyan Iliev / / (substituted on) 69'; Manager: Dimitar Penev: GK / 1 / Jorge Campos; RB / 4 / Ignacio Ambriz; CB / 14 / Paco Ramirez; CB / 22 / Roberto Ruiz Esparza; LB / 21 / Raul Gutierrez / / (substituted off) 84'; RM / 17 / Marcelino Bernal / / (substituted off) 46'; CM / 5 / Miguel España (c); CM / 16 / Alberto Coyote / / (substituted off) 67'; LM / 7 / Missael Espinoza / 12'; RF / 9 / Francisco Uribe / / (substituted off) 65'; LF / 18 / Daniel Guzman / / (substituted off) 82'; Substitutions: RM / 8 / Jose Manuel de la Torre / / (substituted on) 46'; CM / 11 / Gonzalo Farfán / / (substituted on) 65'; LM / 16 / Alberto Garcia Aspe / / (substituted on) 67'; RF / 17 / Carlos Hermosillo / / (substituted on) 82'; CB / 4 / Claudio Suarez / / (substituted on) 84'; Manager: (Argentina) Cesar Luis Menotti	(Turkish Football Federation) Toroğlu
26 August 1992	(Romania) Bucharest	Romania	0–2	Friendly Team details: Romania / Mexico; GK / 1 / Florin Tene; CB / 2 / Gheorghe Mihali; CB / 3 / Emil Săndoi; LB / 5 / Constantin Varga / 45'; RM / 8 / Gabor Gerstenmaier / / (substituted off) 46'; CM / 4 / Marius Cheregi; CM / 6 / Dorinel Munteanu; LM / 7 / Romulus Buia / / (substituted off) 64'; AM / 10 / Daniel Timofte; LF / 11 / Ilie Dumitrescu / 84' / (substituted off) 84'; CF / 9 / Ionel Gane; Substitutes: LB / 14 / Tibor Selymes / / (substituted off) 84'; LM / 18 / Ilie Stan / / (substituted on) 74'; AM / 13 / Basarab Panduru / / (substituted on) 64'; CF / 22 / Ovidiu Hanganu / / (substituted on) 46', (substituted off) 74'; Manager: Cornel Dinu: GK / 1 / Jorge Campos; RB / 4 / Juan Hernández; CB / 22 / Roberto Ruiz Esparza / / (substituted off) 73'; CB / 6 / Ignacio Ambriz; LB / 12 / Paco Ramirez; RM / 8 / José Manuel de la Torre / / (substituted off) 65'; CM / 5 / Miguel España / (c); CM / 11 / Gonzalo Farfan / / (substituted off) 46'; CM / 10 / Alberto García Aspe / / (substituted off) 46'; LM / 7 / Missael Espinoza; CF / 17 / Carlos Hermosillo; Substitutes: CB / 2 / Claudio Suárez / / (substituted on) 73'; CM / 16 / Alberto Coyote / / (substituted on) 46'; RM / 16 / Marcelino Bernal / / (substituted on) 65'; LF / 9 / Francisco Uribe / / (substituted on) 46'; LB / 3 / Guillermo Muñoz; LB / 21 / Raúl Gutierrez; Manager: (Argentina) Cesar Luis Menotti	(Italian Football Federation) A. Pezzella
7 October 1992	(United States) Los Angeles	El Salvador	2–0	Friendly Team details: GK / 1 / Raúl García (footballer); RB / 2 / Miguel Estrada; CB / 3 / Fernando Lazo / (substituted off) 75'; CB / 3 / Giovanni Trigueros; CB / 4 / Mario Mayén Meza; CB / 6 / Leonel Carcamo; LB / 5 / Jorge Abrego / (substituted off) 75'; RM / 7 / Carlos Castro; CM / 8 / Julio Palacios / (substituted off) 90'; RF / 11 / Raul Diaz Arce / (substituted off) 46'; LF / 10 / Mágico González; Substitutes: LM / 21 / Guillermo Rivera / (substituted on) 46'; CM / 16 / Vasquez / (substituted on) 75'; CM / 16 / Jorge Moran / (substituted on) 75'; CM / 16 / Milton Melendez / (substituted on) 90'; Manager: (Uruguay) Anibal Ruiz: GK / 1 / Jorge Campos; RB / 5 / Ignacio Ambriz; CB / 2 / Claudio Suarez; CB / 4 / Juan de Dios Ramirez Perales; LB / 7 / Guillermo Muñoz; RM / 22 / José Manuel de la Torre / 28' / (substituted off) 66'; CM / 8 / Alberto Coyote; CM / 6 / Miguel España / / (substituted off) 82'; LM / 10 / Missael Espinoza / / (substituted off) 75'; RF / 11 / Carlos Hermosillo / 71'; LF / 9 / Francisco Uribe / / (substituted off) 63'; Substitutes: CB / 2 / Luis Roberto Alves / / (substituted on) 63'; LF / 16 / Marcelino Bernal / / (substituted on) 66'; RF / 21 / Alberto Garcia Aspe / / (substituted on) 75'; LM / 16 / Jaime Ordiales / / (substituted on) 82'; Manager: (Argentina) César Luis Menotti	(United States Soccer Federation) J. Majid
14 October 1992	(Germany) Dresden	Germany	1–1	Friendly Team details: Germany / Mexico; GK / 1 / Andreas Köpke; RB / 2 / Thomas Helmer; CB / 3 / Olaf Thon / Yellow card; CB / 4 / Thomas Häßler; LB / 5 / Guido Buchwald; RM / 7 / Stefan Effenberg; CM / 6 / Heiko Scholz; CM / 10 / Lothar Matthäus; LM / 8 / Knut Reinhardt; RF / 9 / Rudi Völler / 58' / (substituted off) 68'; LF / 21 / Karl-Heinz Riedle / / (substituted off) 46'; Substitutes: LF / 11 / Jurgen Klinsmann / / (substituted on) 46'; RF / 18 / Ulf Kirsten / / (substituted on) 68'; Manager: Berti Vogts: GK / 1 / Jorge Campos / Yellow card; RB / 4 / Ignacio Ambriz; CB / 2 / Claudio Suarez; CB / 3 / Juan de Dios Ramirez Perales; LB / 5 / Guillermo Muñoz; RM / 8 / Jose Manuel de la Torre / / (substituted off) 63'; CM / 6 / Miguel España / Yellow card / (c); CM / 15 / Alberto Coyote / / (substituted off) 74'; LM / 7 / Missael Espinoza; RF / 10 / Luis Garcia / / (substituted off) 63'; LF / 11 / Francisco Uribe; Substitutes: LM / 16 / Alberto Garcia Aspe / / (substituted on) 74'; CF / 17 / Carlos Hermosillo / 72' / (substituted on) 63'; LB / 21 / Raul Gutierrez / / (substituted on) 63'; Manager: (Argentina) Cesar Luis Menotti	(Football Association of the Czech Republic) J. Marko
22 October 1992	(Croatia) Zagreb	Croatia	0–3	Friendly Team details: Croatia / Mexico; GK / 1 / Zoran Slavica; RB / 2 / Dubravko Pavlicic; CB / 3 / Slaven Bilic (c); CB / 4 / Drazen Biskup / / (substituted off) 79'; CB / 13 / Slavko Istvanic; LB / 6 / Robert Jarni; RM / 12 / Ante Mise; CM / 10 / Stjepan Andrijasevic; LM / 16 / Zvonimir Boban / / (substituted off) 46'; RF / 17 / Robert Spehar / / (substituted off) 69'; LF / 9 / Davor Suker / / 43', 87'; Substitutes: LM / 5 / Dean Racunica / 82' / (substituted on) 46'; RF / 7 / Igor Cvitanovic / / (substituted on) 69'; MF / 8 / Josip Gaspar / / (substituted on) 79'; Manager: Stanko Poklepovic: GK / 1 / Jorge Campos / (yellow card) 36'; RB / 4 / Ignacio Ambriz; CB / 2 / Claudio Suárez; CB / 3 / Juan de Dios Ramirez Perales; LB / 5 / Joaquín Hernández / (yellow card) 72'; RM / 8 / José Manuel de la Torre / / (substituted off) 64'; CM / 6 / Miguel España / (c); CM / 15 / Alberto Coyote / / (substituted off) 46'; LM / 7 / Missael Espinoza / / (substituted off) 84'; RF / 17 / Carlos Hermosillo; LF / 11 / Francisco Uribe; Substitutes: CM / 22 / Jaime Ordiales / / (substituted on) 46'; LF / 9 / Luis Roberto Alves / / (substituted on) 64'; LM / 14 / Alberto Garcia Aspe / / (substituted on) 84'; (Argentina) Cesar Luis Menotti	(Hungarian Football Federation) A. Huták
8 November 1992	(Saint Vincent and the Grenadines) Kingstown	Saint Vincent and the Grenadines	4–0	1994 FIFA World Cup qualification	(Jamaica Football Federation) N. Smith
15 November 1992	Mexico City	Honduras	2–0	1994 FIFA World Cup qualification	(United States Soccer Federation) R. Dominguez
22 November 1992	Mexico City	Costa Rica	4–0	1994 FIFA World Cup qualification	(National Football Federation of Guatemala) Escobar
29 November 1992	(Costa Rica) San José	Costa Rica	0–2	1994 FIFA World Cup qualification	(Canadian Soccer Association) R. Sawtell
6 December 1992	Mexico City	Saint Vincent and the Grenadines	11–0	1994 FIFA World Cup qualification	(Salvadoran Football Federation) J. Santos
13 December 1992	(Honduras) Tegucigalpa	Honduras	1–1	1994 FIFA World Cup qualification	(United States Soccer Federation) J. D'Aquila

=== 1993 ===
Date	Location	Opponents	Score	Competition	Referee
20 January 1993	(Italy) Florence	Italy	0–2	Friendly Team details: Italy / Mexico; GK / 1 / Gianluca Pagliuca; RB / 2 / Moreno Mannini; CB / 5 / Alessandro Costacurta / / (substituted off) 74'; CB / 6 / Pietro Vierchowod; LB / 3 / Paolo Maldini / (c) / 80'; RM / 7 / Alessandro Bianchi / / (substituted off) 74'; CM / 4 / Demetrio Albertini / / (substituted off) 46'; LM / 8 / Fabrizio Di Mauro; RF / 10 / Roberto Baggio / 56'; CF / 9 / Roberto Mancini / / (substituted off) 83'; LF / 11 / Giuseppe Signori; Substitutes: GK / 12 / Luca Marchegiani; CB / 13 / Franco Baresi / / (substituted on) 74'; RB / 14 / Marco Lanna; CM / 15 / Dino Baggio / (yellow card) 64' / (substituted on) 46'; CM / 16 / Eugenio Corini; RM / 17 / Gianluigi Lentini / / (substituted on) 74'; RF / 18 / Pierluigi Casiraghi / / (substituted on) 83'; Manager: Arrigo Sacchi: GK / 1 / Jorge Campos; RB / 2 / Raul Gutierrez / / (substituted off) 59'; CB / 3 / Juan de Dios Ramirez Perales; CB / 4 / Claudio Suarez; LB / 5 / Ramon Ramirez; RM / 15 / Luis Flores / Yellow card / (substituted off) 65'; CM / 6 / Miguel España / (c); LM / 8 / Ignacio Ambriz; RF / 11 / Luis Garcia; CF / 10 / Francisco Uribe / Yellow card; LF / 7 / Luis Roberto Alves / / (substituted off) 46'; Substitutes: GK / 12 / Pablo Larios; CB / 13 / Roberto Ruiz Esparza / / (substituted on) 59'; LM / 14 / Missael Espinoza; LF / 15 / Francisco Javier Cruz / / (substituted on) 46'; RM / 16 / Roberto Andrade; CM / 17 / Alberto Coyote; CM / 18 / Jaime Ordiales / / (substituted on) 65'; Manager: Miguel Mejia Baron	(French Football Federation) Batta
27 January 1993	(Spain) Las Palmas	Spain	1–1	Friendly Team details: Spain / Mexico; GK / 1 / Andoni Zubizarreta / (c); RB / 5 / Delfí Geli / / (substituted off) 46'; CB / 22 / Roberto Solozábal / / (substituted off) 46'; CB / 6 / Juanma / Yellow card; LB / 2 / Nando / / (substituted off) 46'; RM / 3 / Albert Ferrer; CM / 8 / Fran; CM / 6 / Andoni Imaz; LM / 10 / Julen Guerrero; RF / 21 / Kiko / / (substituted off) 46'; LF / 9 / Alfonso Pérez / / (substituted off) 46'; Substitutes: GK / 12 / Santiago Cañizares; CB / 4 / Rafael Alkorta / / (substituted on) 46'; RB / 13 / Cristobal / / (substituted on) 46'; LB / 14 / Toni / 72' (pen.), (yellow card) / (substituted on) 46'; CM / 16 / Thomas Christiansen / / (substituted on) 46'; LF / 18 / Claudio / Yellow card / (substituted on) 46'; Manager: Javier Clemente: GK / 1 / Jorge Campos; RB / 4 / Ignacio Ambriz; CB / 3 / Juan de Dios Ramirez Perales; CB / 2 / Claudio Suarez / 44'; LB / 5 / Paco Ramirez / Yellow card; RM / 10 / Roberto Andrade / / (substituted off) 65'; CM / 6 / Miguel España / (c); LM / 18 / Jaime Ordiales; RF / 15 / Luis Flores / / (substituted off) 61'; CF / 9 / Luis Garcia; LF / 7 / Luis Roberto Alves; Substitutes: GK / 12 / Pablo Larios; LF / 13 / Francisco Javier Cruz; LM / 14 / Missael Espinoza / / (substituted on) 65'; LF / 21 / Francisco Uribe / / (substituted on) 46'; RM / 16 / Roberto Ruiz Esparza; CM / 17 / Alberto Coyote; Manager: Miguel Mejia Baron	(Swiss Football Association) Röthlisberger
10 February 1993	(Mexico) Monterrey	Romania	2–0	Friendly Team details: GK / 1 / Jorge Campos / / (substituted off) 64'; RB / 2 / Juan Hernández; CB / 22 / Roberto Ruiz Esparza; CB / 3 / Juan de Dios Ramirez Perales; LB / 5 / Paco Ramirez; RM / 4 / Ignacio Ambriz; CM / 8 / Alberto García Aspe / / (substituted off) 80'; LM / 10 / Benjamin Galindo / 34' / (substituted off) 64'; RF / 17 / David Patiño / / (substituted off) 64'; CF / 9 / Hugo Sanchez / (c); LF / 19 / Luis Miguel Salvador / / (substituted off) 46'; Substitutes: LF / 21 / Francisco Javier Cruz / 55' / (substituted on) 46'; LM / 7 / Missael Espinoza / / (substituted on) 64'; CM / 6 / Miguel España / / (substituted on) 64'; GK / 12 / Alejandro Garcia / / (substituted on) 64'; CB / 2 / Claudio Suarez / / (substituted on) 80'; Manager: Miguel Mejia Baron: GK / 1 / Florin Prunea / (substituted off) 46'; CB / 2 / Emil Săndoi; CB / 3 / Catalin Necula; LB / 5 / Tibor Selymes; RM / 8 / Constantin Pana / (substituted off) 67'; CM / 6 / Dorinel Munteanu; CM / 10 / Daniel Timofte / (substituted off) 87'; CM / 7 / Ovidiu Stîngă / (substituted off) 83'; LM / 19 / Silvian Cristescu; LF / 11 / Ilie Dumitrescu; CF / 9 / Ovidiu Hanganu / (substituted off) 82'; Substitutes: GK / 12 / Florin Tene / (substituted off) 46'; LM / 13 / Gheorghe Ceausila / (substituted on) 67'; AM / 14 / Ionel Gane / (substituted on) 82'; CF / 15 / Danut Moisescu / (substituted on) 83'; LM / 16 / Gheorghe Mihali / (substituted on) 87'; Manager: Cornel Dinu	(Mexican Football Federation) A. Mendoza
4 April 1993	(El Salvador) San Salvador	El Salvador	1–2	1994 FIFA World Cup qualification	(Colombian Football Federation) A. Hoyos
11 April 1993	Mexico City	Honduras	3–0	1994 FIFA World Cup qualification	(Costa Rican Football Federation) R. Gutierrez
18 April 1993	Mexico City	El Salvador	3–1	1994 FIFA World Cup qualification	(National Football Federation of Guatemala) Escobar
25 April 1993	Mexico City	Canada	4–0	1994 FIFA World Cup qualification	(Costa Rican Football Federation) B. Ulloa
2 May 1993	(Honduras) Tegucigalpa	Honduras	4–1	1994 FIFA World Cup qualification	(Brazilian Football Confederation) M de Freitas
9 May 1993	(Canada) Toronto	Canada	2–1	1994 FIFA World Cup qualification	(German Football Association) H. Krug
10 June 1993	Mexico City	Paraguay	3–1	Friendly Team details: Mexico / Paraguay; GK / 12 / Jorge Campos; RB / 5 / Miguel Herrera; CB / 3 / Juan de Dios Ramirez Perales; CB / 2 / Claudio Suarez; LB / 21 / Raul Gutierrez / / (substituted off) 58'; RM / 8 / Alberto Garcia Aspe / 71' (pen.); CM / 4 / Ignacio Ambriz; LM / 5 / Ramon Ramirez / / (substituted off) 77'; RF / 11 / Luis Flores / 57' / (substituted off) 66'; CF / 9 / Hugo Sanchez / (c) / (substituted off) 46'; LF / 21 / Daniel Guzman / / (substituted off) 46'; Substitutes: LF / 17 / Luis Roberto Alves / 72' / (substituted on) 46'; GK / 12 / Alejandro Garcia / / (substituted on) 46'; RB / 14 / Juan Hernandez / / (substituted on) 58'; LM / 10 / Benjamin Galindo / / (substituted on) 66'; LB / 18 / Guillermo Muñoz / / (substituted on) 77'; Manager: Miguel Mejia Baron: GK / 1 / Jorge Battaglia; RB / 2 / Mario Ramirez; CB / 3 / Celso Ayala; CB / 4 / Carlos Gamarra / / (substituted off) 75'; CB / 6 / Juan Carlos Villamayor / / (substituted off) 75'; LB / 5 / Silvio Suarez / (c); CM / 7 / Luis Monzon / / (substituted off) 61'; CM / 10 / Gustavo Sotelo / / (substituted off) 62'; CM / 8 / Estanislao Struway / 81'; LM / 9 / Jorge Amado Nunes; CF / 21 / Marcial Garay / / (substituted off) 46'; Substitutes: LM / 11 / Virgilio Ferreira / / (substituted on) 46'; CM / 19 / Vidal Sanabria / / (substituted on) 61'; CM / 23 / Alejandro Cano / / (substituted on) 62'; RM / 18 / Roberto Acuña / / (substituted on) 75'; CM / 22 / Juan Ramon Jara / / (substituted on) 75'; Manager: Alicio Solalinde	(Peruvian Football Federation) J. Ramírez
16 June 1993	(Ecuador) Machala	Colombia	1–2	1993 Copa América	(Uruguayan Football Association) J. Nieves
20 June 1993	(Ecuador) Guayaquil	Argentina	1–1	1993 Copa América	(Paraguayan Football Association) J. Escobar
23 June 1993	(Ecuador) Portoviejo	Bolivia	0–0	1993 Copa América	(Uruguayan Football Association) J. Nieves
27 June 1993	(Ecuador) Quito	Peru	4–2	1993 Copa América	(Football Federation of Chile) I. Guerrero
29 June 1993	(Costa Rica) San José	Costa Rica	0–2	Friendly	(Costa Rican Football Federation) R. Gutierrez
30 June 1993	(Ecuador) Quito	Ecuador	2–0	1993 Copa América	(Peruvian Football Federation) A. Tejada
4 July 1993	(Ecuador) Guayaquil	Argentina	1–2	1993 Copa América	(Brazilian Football Confederation) M. Rezende
11 July 1993	Mexico City	Martinique	9–0	1993 Gold Cup	(Salvadoran Football Federation) J. Alvarado
15 July 1993	Mexico City	Costa Rica	1–1	1993 Gold Cup	(National Autonomous Federation of Football of Honduras) A. Sabillón
18 July 1993	Mexico City	Canada	8–0	1993 Gold Cup	(United States Soccer Federation) R. Dominguez
22 July 1993	Mexico City	Jamaica	6–1	1993 Gold Cup	(National Football Federation of Guatemala) Escobar
25 July 1993	Mexico City	United States	4–0	1993 Gold Cup	(Canadian Soccer Association) R. Sawtell
8 August 1993	(Brazil) Maceió	Brazil	1–1	Friendly Team details: Brazil / Mexico; GK / 1 / Taffarel; RB / 2 / Cafu; CB / 13 / Marcio Santos / 49'; CB / 4 / Ricardo Rocha; LB / 5 / Branco / Yellow card; RM / 10 / Raí; CM / 8 / Mauro Silva; CM / 6 / Dunga / Yellow card; LM / 11 / Palhinha / / (substituted off) 46'; RF / 9 / Müller; LF / 7 / Elivelton / / (substituted off) 46'; Substitutes: FW / 18 / Valdeir / / (substituted on) 46'; FW / 15 / Valdo / / (substituted on) 46'; Manager: Carlos Alberto Parreira: GK / 1 / Jorge Campos; RB / 13 / Miguel Herrera; CB / 3 / Juan de Dios Ramirez Perales; CB / 2 / Claudio Suarez / Yellow card; LB / 5 / Ramon Ramirez; RM / 8 / David Patiño / / Substituted off; CM / 4 / Ignacio Ambriz / Yellow card; CM / 6 / Alberto Garcia Aspe / Yellow card / 62' (pen.); LM / 10 / Benjamin Galindo / (c) / Substituted off; RF / 11 / Daniel Guzman; LF / 9 / Luis Roberto Alves; Substitutes: LM / 7 / Joaquin del Olmo / Yellow card / Substituted on; RM / 15 / Jorge Rodriguez / / Substituted on; Manager: Miguel Mejia Baron	(Brazilian Football Confederation) J. Oliveira
22 September 1993	(United States) Los Angeles	Cameroon	1–0	Friendly	(United States Soccer Federation) A. Angeles
29 September 1993	(United States) Oakland	Poland	0–0 (3–4 (p))	Friendly	(United States Soccer Federation) E. baharmast
6 October 1993	(United States) Los Angeles	South Africa	4–0	Friendly	(United States Soccer Federation) H. Dias
13 October 1993	(United States) Washington, D.C.	United States	1–1	Friendly	(Costa Rican Football Federation) B. Ulloa
20 October 1993	(United States) San Diego	Ukraine	2–1	Friendly	(United States Soccer Federation) H. Dias
3 November 1993	(United States) San Diego	China	3–0	Friendly	(United States Soccer Federation) A. Angeles
16 December 1993	(Mexico) Guadalajara	Brazil	0–1	Friendly Team details: Brazil / Mexico; GK / 1 / Zetti / / (substituted off) 46'; RB / 2 / Jorginho; CB / 3 / Ronaldao; CB / 4 / Ricardo Rocha / Yellow card; LB / 5 / Branco / / (substituted off) 46'; RM / 10 / Palhinha / / (substituted off) 46'; CM / 8 / Dinho; CM / 6 / Dunga / (c) / (substituted off) 65'; LM / 7 / Rivaldo / 16'; RF / 11 / Müller; LF / 9 / Renato Gaúcho / Yellow card / (substituted off) 80'; Substitutes: LB / 19 / Leonardo / / (substituted on) 46'; GK / 23 / Gilmar / / (substituted on) 46'; CM / 22 / Alberto / / (substituted on) 46'; RF / 28 / Paulo Sérgio / / (substituted on) 65'; LF / 17 / Viola / / (substituted on) 80'; Manager: Carlos Alberto Parreira: GK / 1 / Jorge Campos; RB / 14 / Miguel Herrera; CB / 4 / Ignacio Ambriz / / (substituted off) 46'; CB / 3 / Abraham Nava; LB / 5 / Joaquin del Olmo / / (substituted off) 75'; RM / 17 / Jorge Rodriguez / / (substituted off) 75'; CM / 8 / Marcelino Bernal; CM / 6 / Alberto Garcia Aspe; LM / 10 / Benjamin Galindo / / (substituted off) 46'; RF / 9 / Hugo Sanchez / (c); LF / 11 / Luis Miguel Salvador / / (substituted off) 46'; Substitutes: LF / 17 / Luis Roberto Alves / / (substituted on) 46'; CM / 21 / Guadalupe Castañeda / / (substituted on) 46'; CB / 22 / Jose Luis Salgado / / (substituted on) 46'; CF / 27 / Carlos Hermosillo / / (substituted on) 75'; LF / 7 / David Patiño / / (substituted on) 75'; Manager: Miguel Mejia Baron	(Costa Rican Football Federation) B. Ulloa
22 December 1993	Mexico City	Germany	0–0	Friendly Team details: Mexico / Germany; GK / 1 / Jorge Campos; RB / 15 / Jorge Rodriguez; CB / 4 / Ignacio Ambriz; CB / 3 / Juan de Dios Ramirez Perales / Yellow card; LB / 7 / Ramón Ramírez / / (substituted off) 81'; RM / 6 / David Patiño / (c) / (substituted off) 46'; CM / 2 / Marcelino Bernal; CM / 8 / Alberto García Aspe / / (substituted off) 46'; LM / 5 / Joaquín del Olmo; RF / 10 / Luis Garcia; LF / 11 / Luis Roberto Alves; Substitutes: LM / 10 / Benjamin Galindo / / (substituted on) 46'; RB / 2 / Miguel Herrera / / (substituted on) 46'; CM / 21 / Guadalupe Castañeda / / (substituted on) 81'; Manager: Miguel Mejia Baron: GK / 1 / Bodo Illgner; RB / 2 / Matthias Sammer; CB / 3 / Jürgen Kohler / Yellow card; CB / 4 / Michael Schulz; LB / 18 / Christian Ziege / 58' / (substituted off) 64'; RM / 7 / Stefan Effenberg / / (substituted off) 78'; CM / 5 / Thomas Strunz; CM / 10 / Lothar Matthäus / (c); LM / 6 / Andreas Möller; RF / 8 / Maurizio Gaudino / / (substituted off) 54'; LF / 18 / Jurgen Klinsmann / / (substituted off) 71'; Substitutes: CB / 11 / Thomas Hässler / / (substituted on) 54'; RF / 18 / Stefan Kuntz / / (substituted on) 64'; LF / 21 / Ulf Kirsten / / (substituted on) 71'; CM / 22 / Dieter Eilts / / (substituted on) 78'; Manager: Berti Vogts	(Canadian Soccer Association) R. Satwell

=== 1994 ===
Date	Location	Opponents	Score	Competition	Referee
19 January 1994	(United States) San Diego	Bulgaria	1–1	Friendly	(United States Soccer Federation) H. Dias
26 January 1994	(United States) Oakland	Switzerland	1–5	Friendly	(United States Soccer Federation) E. Baharmast
2 February 1994	(United States) Oakland	Russia	1–4	Friendly	(United States Soccer Federation) B. Hall
24 February 1994	(United States) Fresno	Sweden	2–1	Friendly	(United States Soccer Federation) B. Hall
2 March 1994	Mexico City	Colombia	0–0	Friendly	(Uruguayan Football Association) Dluzniewski
4 June 1994	(United States) Pasadena	United States	0–1	Friendly Team details: United States / Mexico; GK / 1 / Tony Meola; RB / 2 / Mike Burns; CB / 3 / Thomas Dooley; CB / 4 / Cle Kooiman; LB / 5 / Alexi Lalas / (c); RM / 7 / Paul Caligiuri; CM / 6 / Mike Sorber; CM / 10 / Tab Ramos; CM / 8 / Claudio Reyna / / (substituted off) 89'; LM / 9 / Hugo Perez / / (substituted off) 46'; CF / 21 / Frank Klopas / / (substituted off) 46'; Substitutes: LM / 11 / Eric Wynalda / / (substituted on) 46'; CM / 19 / Roy Wegerle / 51' / (substituted on) 46', (substituted off) 89'; CM / 29 / Joe-Max Moore / / (substituted on) 89'; CM / 19 / Cobi Jones / / (substituted on) 89'; Manager: (Socialist Federal Republic of Yugoslavia) Velibor Milutinovic: GK / 12 / Jorge Campos; RB / 21 / Raul Gutierrez; CB / 3 / Juan de Dios Ramirez Perales; CB / 4 / Ignacio Ambriz; LB / 5 / Ramon Ramirez; RM / 7 / Jorge Rodriguez / / (substituted off) 46'; CM / 6 / Marcelino Bernal; CM / 16 / Juan Carlos Chavez / / (substituted off) 68'; LM / 10 / Benjamin Galindo / (c); RF / 9 / Luis Garcia; LF / 27 / Carlos Hermosillo / / (substituted off) 37'; Substitutes: LF / 19 / Luis Miguel Salvador / / (substituted on) 37'; CM / 8 / Alberto Garcia Aspe / / (substituted on) 46'; LM / 18 / Missael Espinoza / / (substituted on) 68'; Manager: Miguel Mejia Baron	(Costa Rican Football Federation) B. Ulloa
11 June 1994	(United States) Miami	Northern Ireland	3–0	Friendly Team details: Northern Ireland / Mexico; GK / 1 / Alan Fettis / (substituted off) 46'; RB / 5 / Gerry Taggart; CB / 22 / Nigel Worthington; CB / 6 / Mal Donaghy; LB / 2 / Gary Fleming / (substituted off) 74'; RM / 3 / Steve Lomas; CM / 8 / Jim Magilton / (substituted off) 46'; LM / 6 / Michael Hughes; RF / 10 / Kevin Wilson / (substituted off) 46'; CF / 21 / Jimmy Quinn / (substituted off) 46'; LF / 9 / George O'Boyle; Substitutes: GK / 12 / Neil Lennon / (substituted on) 46'; CB / 4 / Iain Dowie / (substituted on) 46'; RB / 13 / Darren Patterson / (substituted on) 46'; GK / 14 / Tommy Wright / (substituted on) 46'; CM / 16 / Steve Morrow / (substituted on) 74'; Manager: Bryan Hamilton: GK / 1 / Jorge Campos; RB / 21 / Raul Gutierrez; CB / 2 / Claudio Suarez; CB / 3 / Juan de Dios Ramirez Perales; LB / 5 / Ramon Ramirez; RM / 15 / Joaquin del Olmo; CM / 4 / Ignacio Ambriz; LM / 18 / Luis Antonio Valdez; RF / 10 / Luis Garcia / (substituted off) 33' / 18' (pen.), 30'; CF / 9 / Hugo Sanchez / (substituted off) 60'; LF / 17 / Luis Roberto Alves; Substitutes: LM / 10 / Benjamin Galindo / (substituted on) 33' / (substituted off) 57'; LM / 14 / Missael Espinoza / (substituted on) 57'; CF / 27 / Carlos Hermosillo / (substituted on) 60' / 77'; Manager: Miguel Mejia Baron	(United States Soccer Federation) H. Dias
19 June 1994	(United States) Washington, D.C.	Norway	0–1	1994 FIFA World Cup	(Hungarian Football Federation) S. Puhl
24 June 1994	(United States) Orlando	Republic of Ireland	2–1	1994 FIFA World Cup	(Swiss Football Association) Röthlisberger
28 June 1994	(United States) Washington, D.C.	Italy	1–1	1994 FIFA World Cup	(Argentine Football Association) F. Lamolina
5 July 1994	(United States) New York	Bulgaria	1–1 (1–3 (p))	1994 FIFA World Cup	(Syrian Football Association) Al Sharif
14 December 1994	Mexico City	Hungary	5–1	Friendly	(National Autonomous Federation of Football of Honduras) A. Sabillón

=== 1995 ===
Date	Location	Opponents	Score	Competition	Referee
6 January 1995	(Saudi Arabia) Riyadh	Saudi Arabia	0–2	1995 King Fahd Cup	(Football Federation of Chile) Imperatore
10 January 1995	(Saudi Arabia) Riyadh	Denmark	1–1 (2–4 (p))	1995 King Fahd Cup	(Mauritius Football Association) Kee Chong
13 January 1995	(Saudi Arabia) Riyadh	Nigeria	1–1 (4–4 (p))	1995 King Fahd Cup	(Romanian Football Federation) Crănciunescu
1 February 1995	(United States) San Diego	Uruguay	1–0	Friendly	(United States Soccer Federation) Angeles
29 March 1995	(United States) Los Angeles	Chile	1–2	Friendly	(United States Soccer Federation) Angeles
18 June 1995	(United States) Washington, D.C.	United States	0–4	1995 U.S. Cup	(Costa Rican Football Federation) V. Rodríguez
21 June 1995	(United States) Washington, D.C.	Colombia	0–0	1995 U.S. Cup	(United States Soccer Federation) Baharmast
24 June 1995	(United States) Dallas	Nigeria	2–1	1995 U.S. Cup	(United States Soccer Federation) A. Angeles
6 July 1995	(Uruguay) Maldonado	Paraguay	2–1	1995 Copa América	(Ecuadorian Football Federation) A. Rodas
9 July 1995	(Uruguay) Maldonado	Venezuela	3–1	1995 Copa América	(United States Soccer Federation) R. Dominguez
13 July 1995	(Uruguay) Montevideo	Uruguay	1–1	1995 Copa América	(Argentine Football Association) Castrilli
17 July 1995	(Uruguay) Paysandú	United States	0–0 (1–4 (p))	1995 Copa América	(Colombian Football Federation) Ó. Ruiz
11 October 1995	(United States) Los Angeles	Saudi Arabia	2–1	Friendly	(United States Soccer Federation) J. Patlak
16 November 1995	(Mexico) Monterrey	Yugoslavia	1–4	Friendly	(Costa Rican Football Federation) R. Méndez
30 November 1995	(United States) Los Angeles	Colombia	2–2	Friendly	(United States Soccer Federation) A. Angeles
6 December 1995	(Mexico) Hermosillo	Slovenia	1–2	Friendly	(Mexican Football Federation) M. Salas

=== 1996 ===
Date	Location	Opponents	Score	Competition	Referee
11 January 1996	(United States) San Diego	Saint Vincent and the Grenadines	5–0	1996 CONCACAF Gold Cup	(United States Soccer Federation) Baharmast
14 January 1996	(United States) San Diego	Guatemala	1–0	1996 CONCACAF Gold Cup	(Costa Rican Football Federation) R. Gutiérrez
19 January 1996	(United States) San Diego	Guatemala	1–0	1996 CONCACAF Gold Cup	(United States Soccer Federation) E. Baharmast
21 January 1996	(United States) Los Angeles	Brazil	0–2	1996 CONCACAF Gold Cup	(Trinidad and Tobago Football Association) R. Ramdhan
7 February 1996	(Chile) Viña del Mar	Chile	2–1	Friendly	(Uruguayan Football Association) J. Matto
17 May 1996	(United States) Chicago	Slovakia	5–2	Friendly	(United States Soccer Federation) R. Grady
23 May 1996	(Japan) Shimizu	Yugoslavia	0–0	1996 Kirin Cup	(Japan Football Association) M. Okada
29 May 1996	(Japan) Fukuoka	Japan	3–2	1996 Kirin Cup	(Football Association of Malaysia) Yaakub
8 June 1996	(United States) Dallas	Bolivia	1–0	1996 U.S. Cup	(United States Soccer Federation) B. Hall
12 June 1996	(United States) New Jersey	Republic of Ireland	2–2	1996 U.S. Cup	(United States Soccer Federation) R. Dominguez
16 June 1996	(United States) Pasadena	United States	2–2	1996 U.S. Cup	(Costa Rican Football Federation) R. Gutiérrez
31 August 1996	(France) Paris	France	2–0	Friendly	(Football Association of Ireland) J. Bryne
15 September 1996	(Saint Vincent and the Grenadines) Kingstown	Saint Vincent and the Grenadines	0–3	1998 FIFA World Cup qualification	(Salvadoran Football Federation) R. Medina
21 September 1996	(Honduras) San Pedro Sula	Honduras	2–1	1998 FIFA World Cup qualification	(United States Soccer Federation) R. Dominguez
16 October 1996	Mexico City	Jamaica	2–1	1998 FIFA World Cup qualification	(Trinidad and Tobago Football Association) R. Ramdhah
23 October 1996	(United States) Oakland	Ecuador	0–1	Friendly	(United States Soccer Federation) B. Hall
30 October 1996	Mexico City	Saint Vincent and the Grenadines	5–1	1998 FIFA World Cup qualification	(Canadian Soccer Association) R. Parra
6 November 1996	Mexico City	Honduras	3–1	1998 FIFA World Cup qualification	(Costa Rican Football Federation) R. Badilla
17 November 1996	(Jamaica) Kingston	Jamaica	1–0	1998 FIFA World Cup qualification	(National Football Federation of Guatemala) Escobar
20 November 1996	(United States) Los Angeles	El Salvador	3–1	Friendly	(United States Soccer Federation) E. Baharmast

=== 1997 ===
Date	Location	Opponents	Score	Competition	Referee
19 January 1997	(United States) Pasadena	United States	0–2	1997 U.S. Cup	(Canadian Soccer Association) K. Skinner
5 February 1997	Mexico City	Ecuador	3–1	Friendly	(Mexican Football Federation) B. Archundia
19 February 1997	(United States) Fresno	Guatemala	1–1	Friendly	(United States Soccer Federation) T. Weyland
2 March 1997	Mexico City	Canada	4–0	1998 FIFA World Cup qualification	(National Autonomous Federation of Football of Honduras) A. Sabillon
16 March 1997	(Costa Rica) San José	Costa Rica	0–0	1998 FIFA World Cup qualification	(Peruvian Football Federation) A. Tejada
29 March 1997	(England) London	England	2–0	Friendly	(Portuguese Football Federation) Pereira
13 April 1997	Mexico City	Jamaica	6–0	1998 FIFA World Cup qualification	(Brazilian Football Confederation) A. Pereira
20 April 1997	(United States) Massachusetts	United States	2–2	1998 FIFA World Cup qualification	(Paraguayan Football Association) U. Aquino
30 April 1997	(United States) Miami	Brazil	0–4	Friendly	(United States Soccer Federation) E. Baharmast
8 June 1997	(El Salvador) San Salvador	El Salvador	0–1	1998 FIFA World Cup qualification	(Argentine Football Association) H. Cordero
13 June 1997	(Bolivia) Santa Cruz de la Sierra	Colombia	2–1	1997 Copa América	(Argentine Football Association) Elizondo
16 June 1997	(Bolivia) Santa Cruz de la Sierra	Brazil	3–2	1997 Copa América	(Peruvian Football Federation) J. Arana
19 June 1997	(Bolivia) Santa Cruz de la Sierra	Costa Rica	1–1	1997 Copa América	(Paraguayan Football Association) E. González
22 June 1997	(Bolivia) Cochabamba	Ecuador	1–1 (3–4 (p))	1997 Copa América	(Brazilian Football Confederation) A. Pereira
25 June 1997	(Bolivia) La Paz	Bolivia	3–1	1997 Copa América	(Paraguayan Football Association) E. Gonzalez
28 June 1997	(Bolivia) La Paz	Peru	1–0	1997 Copa América	(Venezuelan Football Federation) P. Borogosano
5 October 1997	Mexico City	El Salvador	5–0	1998 FIFA World Cup qualification	(Football Federation of Chile) E. Gamboa
12 October 1997	(Canada) Edmonton	Canada	2–2	1998 FIFA World Cup qualification	(National Football Federation of Guatemala) C. Euceda
2 November 1997	Mexico City	United States	0–0	1998 FIFA World Cup qualification	(Argentine Football Association) Castrilli
9 November 1997	Mexico City	Costa Rica	3–3	1998 FIFA World Cup qualification	(United Arab Emirates Football Association) Bujsaim
16 November 1997	(Jamaica) Kingston	Jamaica	0–0	1998 FIFA World Cup qualification	(Peruvian Football Federation) J. Araña
12 December 1997	(Saudi Arabia) Riyadh	Australia	1–3	1997 FIFA Confederations Cup	(Football Association of Thailand) P. Un-prasert
14 December 1997	(Saudi Arabia) Riyadh	Saudi Arabia	0–5	1997 FIFA Confederations Cup	(South African Football Association) I. McLeod
16 December 1997	(Saudi Arabia) Riyadh	Brazil	3–2	1997 FIFA Confederations Cup	(South African Football Association) I. McLeod

=== 1998 ===
Date	Location	Opponents	Score	Competition	Referee
4 February 1998	(United States) Oakland	Trinidad and Tobago	4–2	1998 CONCACAF Gold Cup	(Brazilian Football Confederation) Mendonça
7 February 1998	(United States) Oakland	Honduras	2–0	1998 CONCACAF Gold Cup	(United States Soccer Federation) E. Baharmast
12 February 1998	(United States) Los Angeles	Jamaica	1–0	1998 CONCACAF Gold Cup	(Costa Rican Football Federation) R. Badilla
15 February 1998	(United States) Los Angeles	United States	0–1	1998 CONCACAF Gold Cup	(Trinidad and Tobago Football Association) R. Ramdhan
24 February 1998	(United States) Miami	Netherlands	2–3	Friendly	(United States Soccer Federation) Hall
18 March 1998	Mexico City	Paraguay	1–1	Friendly	(Costa Rican Football Federation) R. Gutierrez
15 April 1998	(United States) Los Angeles	Peru	1–0	Friendly	(United States Soccer Federation) Angeles
9 May 1998	(Italy) Montecatini	Estonia	0–6	Friendly	(Italian Football Federation) Bolognino
20 May 1998	(Norway) Oslo	Norway	5–2	Friendly	(Swedish Football Association) Sundell
23 May 1998	(Republic of Ireland) Dublín	Republic of Ireland	0–0	Friendly	(Football Association of Wales) Ashman
31 May 1998	(Switzerland) Lausanne	Japan	1–2	Friendly	(Swiss Football Association) Detruche
3 June 1998	(France) Paris	Saudi Arabia	0–0	Friendly	(French Football Federation) Creteil
13 June 1998	(France) Lyon	South Korea	1–3	1998 FIFA World Cup	(Austrian Football Association) Benkö
20 June 1998	(France) Bordeaux	Belgium	2–2	1998 FIFA World Cup	(Scottish Football Association) Dallas
25 June 1998	(France) Saint-Étienne	Netherlands	2–2	1998 FIFA World Cup	(Saudi Arabian Football Federation) Al-Zeid
29 June 1998	(France) Montpellier	Germany	2–1	1998 FIFA World Cup	(Portuguese Football Federation) Pereira
17 November 1998	(United States) Los Angeles	El Salvador	2–0	Friendly	(United States Soccer Federation) K. Scott
18 November 1998	(United States) Los Angeles	Guatemala	2–2 (3–5 (p))	Friendly	(Costa Rican Football Federation) R. Gutierrez

=== 1999 ===
Date	Location	Opponents	Score	Competition	Referee
10 February 1999	(United States) Los Angeles	Argentina	0–1	Friendly	(United States Soccer Federation) R. Grady
19 February 1999	Hong Kong	Egypt	0–3	1999 Carlsberg Cup	(Scottish Football Association) W. Young
11 March 1999	(United States) Los Angeles	Bolivia	2–1	1999 U.S. Cup	(United States Soccer Federation) T. Weyland
13 March 1999	(United States) San Diego	United States	1–2	1999 U.S. Cup	(Canadian Soccer Association) R. Parra
14 April 1999	(Mexico) Monterrey	Ecuador	0–0	Friendly	(United States Soccer Federation) Stott
28 April 1999	(Paraguay) Pedro Juan Caballero	Paraguay	2–1	Friendly	(Argentine Football Association) Elizondo
9 June 1999	(United States) Chicago	Argentina	2–2	Friendly	(United States Soccer Federation) R. Grady
12 June 1999	(South Korea) Seoul	South Korea	1–1	1999 Korea Cup	(Chinese Football Association) Lu Jun
16 June 1999	(South Korea) Seoul	Croatia	2–1	1999 Korea Cup	(Korea Football Association) K. Byung-ho
18 June 1999	(South Korea) Seoul	Egypt	0–2	1999 Korea Cup	(Korea Football Association) Hae-Yong
30 June 1999	(Paraguay) Ciudad del Este	Chile	0–1	1999 Copa América	(Argentine Football Association) Elizondo
3 July 1999	(Paraguay) Ciudad del Este	Brazil	2–1	1999 Copa América	(Uruguayan Football Association) Méndez
6 July 1999	(Paraguay) Ciudad del Este	Venezuela	3–1	1999 Copa América	(Paraguayan Football Association) B. Nuñez
10 July 1999	(Paraguay) Asunción	Peru	3–3 (2–4 (p))	1999 Copa América	(Brazilian Football Confederation) W. de Souza
14 July 1999	(Paraguay) Ciudad del Este	Brazil	0–2	1999 Copa América	(Ecuadorian Football Federation) Moreno
17 July 1999	(Paraguay) Asunción	Chile	1–2	1999 Copa América	(Argentine Football Association) H. Elizondo
25 July 1999	Mexico City	Saudi Arabia	5–1	1999 FIFA Confederations Cup	(Colombian Football Federation) Ó. Ruiz
27 July 1999	Mexico City	Egypt	2–2	1999 FIFA Confederations Cup	(Korea Football Association) Young-joo
29 July 1999	Mexico City	Bolivia	1–0	1999 FIFA Confederations Cup	(Colombian Football Federation) Ó. Ruiz
1 August 1999	Mexico City	United States	1–0	1999 FIFA Confederations Cup	(Korea Football Association) Young-joo
4 August 1999	Mexico City	Brazil	4–3	1999 FIFA Confederations Cup	(Swedish Football Association) A. Frisk
13 October 1999	(United States) Chicago	Paraguay	0–1	Friendly	(United States Soccer Federation) T. Weyland
20 October 1999	(United States) San Diego	Colombia	0–0	Friendly	(United States Soccer Federation) Valenzuela
27 October 1999	(United States) Houston	Ecuador	0–0	Friendly	(United States Soccer Federation) A. Saheli

== Results 2000–2009 ==
Date	Location and Stadium	Opponents	Score	Goals	Penalties	Competition	Referee	N and R
9 January 2000	(United States) Oakland	Iran	2–0	Luis Hernández 3', Cuauhtemoc Blanco 18'		Friendly	(United States Soccer Federation) Valenzuela	
5 February 2000	Hong Kong	Japan	0–1	Miguel Zepeda 55'		2000 Carlsberg Cup	(Scottish Football Association) H. Dallas	
8 February 2000	Hong Kong	Czech Republic	2–1	Michal Kolomaznik 50', Pavel Verbíř 60', Miguel Zepeda 79'(p)		2000 Carlsberg Cup	(Danish Football Association) Nielsen	
13 February 2000	(United States) San Diego	Trinidad and Tobago	4–0			2000 CONCACAF Gold Cup	(Salvadoran Football Federation) Rodríguez	
17 February 2000	(United States) Los Angeles	Guatemala	1–1			2000 CONCACAF Gold Cup	(Uruguayan Football Association) Méndez	
20 February 2000	(United States) San Diego	Canada	1–2			2000 CONCACAF Gold Cup	(Jamaica Football Federation) Prendergast	
4 June 2000	(United States) Chicago	Republic of Ireland	2–2			2000 U.S. Cup	(United States Soccer Federation) Stott	
7 June 2000	(United States) Dallas	South Africa	4–2			2000 U.S. Cup	(United States Soccer Federation) B. Hall	
11 June 2000	(United States) New Jersey	United States	3–0			2000 U.S. Cup	(Jamaica Football Federation) Prendergast	
1 July 2000	(United States) San Francisco	El Salvador	3–0			Friendly	(United States Soccer Federation) R. Valenzuela	
16 July 2000	Panama City	Panama	0–1			2002 FIFA World Cup qualification	(United States Soccer Federation) B. Hall	
23 July 2000	(Trinidad and Tobago) Port of Spain	Trinidad and Tobago	1–0			2002 FIFA World Cup qualification	(United States Soccer Federation) K. Stott	
15 August 2000	Mexico City	Canada	2–0			2002 FIFA World Cup qualification	(Jamaica Football Federation) Prendergast	
3 September 2000	Mexico City	Panama	7–1			2002 FIFA World Cup qualification	(National Autonomous Federation of Football of Honduras) N. Cailx	
20 September 2000	(United States) San Diego	Ecuador	2–0			Friendly	(United States Soccer Federation) K. Stott	
27 September 2000	(United States) San Jose	Bolivia	1–0			Friendly	(United States Soccer Federation) Valenzuela	
8 October 2000	Mexico City	Trinidad and Tobago	7–0			2002 FIFA World Cup qualification	(National Football Federation of Guatemala) C. Batres	
25 October 2000	(United States) Los Angeles	United States	2–0			Friendly	(National Football Federation of Guatemala) C. Batres	
15 November 2000	(Canada) Toronto	Canada	0–0			2002 FIFA World Cup qualification	(Dominican Football Federation) S. Richard	
20 December 2000	(United States) Los Angeles	Argentina	0–2			Friendly	(United States Soccer Federation) T. Weyland	
24 January 2001	(Mexico) Morelia	Bulgaria	0–2			Friendly	(United States Soccer Federation) A. Saheli	
31 January 2001	(United States) Los Angeles	Colombia	2–3			Friendly	(United States Soccer Federation) B. Hall	
28 February 2001	(United States) Columbus	United States	2–0			2002 FIFA World Cup qualification	(Salvadoran Football Federation) Sibrian	
7 March 2001	(Mexico) Guadalajara	Brazil	3–3			Friendly	(Costa Rican Football Federation) W. Mattus	
25 March 2001	Mexico City	Jamaica	4–0			2002 FIFA World Cup qualification	(Canadian Soccer Association) Navarro	
11 April 2001	(Mexico) Monterrey	Chile	1–0			Friendly	(United States Soccer Federation) Valenzuela	
25 April 2001	(Trinidad and Tobago) Port of Spain	Trinidad and Tobago	1–1			2002 FIFA World Cup qualification	(Kuwait Football Association) Saad Mane	
25 May 2001	(England) Derby	England	4–0			Friendly	(Portuguese Football Federation) L. Cortes	
30 May 2001	(South Korea) Suwon	Australia	2–0			2001 FIFA Confederations Cup	(Zimbabwe Football Association) Tangawarima	
1 June 2001	(South Korea) Ulsan	South Korea	2–1			2001 FIFA Confederations Cup	(Scottish Football Association) Dallas	
3 June 2001	(South Korea) Ulsan	France	4–0			2001 FIFA Confederations Cup	(United Arab Emirates Football Association) Ali Bujsaim	
16 June 2001	Mexico City	Costa Rica	1–2			2002 FIFA World Cup qualification	(National Football Federation of Guatemala) Batres	
20 June 2001	(Honduras) San Pedro Sula	Honduras	3–1			2002 FIFA World Cup qualification	(Argentine Football Association) Elizondo	
1 July 2001	Mexico City	United States	1–0			2002 FIFA World Cup qualification	(Korea Football Association) Kim	
12 July 2001	(Colombia) Cali	Brazil	0–1			2001 Copa América	(Colombian Football Federation) Ó. Ruiz	
15 July 2001	(Colombia) Cali	Paraguay	0–0			2001 Copa América	(Ecuadorian Football Federation) R. Zambrano	
18 July 2001	(Colombia) Cali	Peru	1–0			2001 Copa América	(Bolivian Football Federation) Ortubé	
22 July 2001	(Colombia) Pereira	Chile	0–2			2001 Copa América	(Brazilian Football Confederation) C. Simon	
25 July 2001	(Colombia) Pereira	Uruguay	2–1			2001 Copa América	(Argentine Football Association) A. Sánchez	
29 July 2001	(Colombia) Bogotá	Colombia	1–0			2001 Copa América	(Paraguayan Football Association) Aquino	
23 August 2001	(Mexico) Veracruz	Liberia	5–4			Friendly	(National Autonomous Federation of Football of Honduras) J. Pineda	
2 September 2001	(Jamaica) Kingston	Jamaica	1–2			2002 FIFA World Cup qualification	(Egyptian Football Association) Al-Ghandour	
5 September 2001	Mexico City	Trinidad and Tobago	3–0			2002 FIFA World Cup qualification	(Canadian Soccer Association) J. Martinez	
7 October 2001	(Costa Rica) San José	Costa Rica	0–0			2002 FIFA World Cup qualification	(Brazilian Football Confederation) Da Silva	
31 October 2001	(Mexico) Puebla	El Salvador	4–1			Friendly	(United States Soccer Federation) B. Hall	
11 November 2001	Mexico City	Honduras	3–0			2002 FIFA World Cup qualification	(National Football Federation of Guatemala) Batres	
14 November 2001	(Spain) Huelva	Spain	1–0			Friendly	(Italian Football Federation) D. Messina	
19 January 2002	(United States) Pasadena	El Salvador	0–1			2002 CONCACAF Gold Cup	(Ecuadorian Football Federation) R. Zambrano	
21 January 2002	(United States) Pasadena	Guatemala	3–1			2002 CONCACAF Gold Cup	(Jamaica Football Federation) Predergast	
27 January 2002	(United States) Pasadena	South Korea	0–0 (2–4 (p))			2002 CONCACAF Gold Cup	(National Autonomous Federation of Football of Honduras) J. Pineda	
13 February 2002	(United States) Phoenix	Yugoslavia	1–2			Friendly	(United States Soccer Federation) Stott	
13 March 2002	(United States) San Diego	Albania	4–0			Friendly	(United States Soccer Federation) Stott	
3 April 2002	(United States) Denver	United States	0–1			Friendly	(Jamaica Football Federation) C. Wright	
17 April 2002	(United States) East Rutherford	Bulgaria	1–0			Friendly	(United States Soccer Federation) A. Saheli	
12 May 2002	Mexico City	Colombia	2–1			Friendly	(Salvadoran Football Federation) R. Sibrían	
3 June 2002	(Japan) Niigata	Croatia	0–1			2002 FIFA World Cup	(Chinese Football Association) Lu Jun	
9 June 2002	(Japan) Miyagi	Ecuador	2–1			2002 FIFA World Cup	(Tunisian Football Federation) M. Daami	
13 June 2002	(Japan) Ōita	Italy	1–1			2002 FIFA World Cup	(Brazilian Football Confederation) C. Simon	
17 June 2002	(South Korea) Jeonju	United States	0–2			2002 FIFA World Cup	(Portuguese Football Federation) V. Pereira	
4 February 2003	(United States) Los Angeles	Argentina	0–1			Friendly	(United States Soccer Federation) Stott	
12 February 2003	(United States) San Diego	Colombia	0–0			Friendly	(United States Soccer Federation) Valenzuela	
19 March 2003	(United States) Irving	Bolivia	2–0			Friendly	(United States Soccer Federation) K. Terry	
26 March 2003	(United States) San Diego	Paraguay	1–1			Friendly	(United States Soccer Federation) M. Kennedy	
30 April 2003	(Mexico) Guadalajara	Brazil	0–0			Friendly	(Colombian Football Federation) O. Ruiz	
8 May 2003	(United States) Houston	United States	0–0			Friendly	(Jamaica Football Federation) Prendergast	
13 July 2003	Mexico City	Brazil	1–0			2003 CONCACAF Gold Cup	(Salvadoran Football Federation) R. Sibrían	
17 July 2003	Mexico City	Honduras	0–0			2003 CONCACAF Gold Cup	(Salvadoran Football Federation) N. Alfaro	
20 July 2003	Mexico City	Jamaica	5–0			2003 CONCACAF Gold Cup	(Canadian Soccer Association) M. Navarro	
24 July 2003	Mexico City	Costa Rica	2–0			2003 CONCACAF Gold Cup	(Salvadoran Football Federation) N. Alfaro	
27 July 2003	Mexico City	Brazil	1–0			2003 CONCACAF Gold Cup	(Canadian Soccer Association) M. Navarro	
20 August 2003	(United States) East Rutherford	Peru	1–3			Friendly	(United States Soccer Federation) B. Hall	
15 October 2003	(United States) Chicago	Uruguay	0–2			Friendly	(United States Soccer Federation) M. Kennedy	
19 November 2003	(United States) San Francisco	Iceland	0–0			Friendly	(United States Soccer Federation) A. Saheli	
18 February 2004	(United States) Carson	Chile	1–1			Friendly	(United States Soccer Federation) A. Prus	
10 March 2004	(Mexico) Tuxtla Gutiérrez	Ecuador	2–1			Friendly	(National Football Federation of Guatemala) Batres	
31 March 2004	(United States) Carson	Costa Rica	2–0			Friendly	(United States Soccer Federation) Stott	
28 April 2004	(United States) Dallas	United States	1–0			Friendly	(Canadian Soccer Association) M. Navarro	
19 June 2004	(United States) San Antonio	Dominica	0–10			2006 FIFA World Cup qualification	(Barbados Football Association) B. Callender	
27 June 2004	(Mexico) Aguascalientes	Dominica	8–0			2006 FIFA World Cup Qualification	(United States Soccer Federation) K. Stott	
7 July 2004	(Peru) Chiclayo	Uruguay	2–2			2004 Copa América	(Peruvian Football Federation) G. Hidalgo	
10 July 2004	(Peru) Chiclayo	Argentina	1–0			2004 Copa América	(Brazilian Football Confederation) R. de Freitas	
13 July 2004	(Peru) Piura	Ecuador	2–1			2004 Copa América	(Peruvian Football Federation) E. Lecca	
18 July 2004	(Peru) Piura	Brazil	0–4			2004 Copa América	(Colombian Football Federation) Ó. Ruiz	
8 September 2004	(Trinidad and Tobago) Port of Spain	Trinidad and Tobago	1–3			2006 FIFA World Cup qualification	(Canadian Soccer Association) M. Navarro	
6 October 2004	(Mexico) Pachuca	Saint Vincent and the Grenadines	7–0			2006 FIFA World Cup qualification	(Canadian Soccer Association) Hu Liu	
10 October 2004	(Saint Vincent and the Grenadines) Kingstown	Saint Vincent and the Grenadines	0–1			2006 FIFA World Cup qualification	(Salvadoran Football Federation) N. Alfaro	
13 October 2004	(Mexico) Puebla	Trinidad and Tobago	3–0			2006 FIFA World Cup qualification	(Salvadoran Football Federation) R. Sibrian	
27 October 2004	(United States) New Jersey	Ecuador	2–1			Friendly	(United States Soccer Federation) A. Prus	
10 November 2004	(United States) San Antonio	Guatemala	2–0			Friendly	(United States Soccer Federation) K. Terry	
13 November 2004	(United States) Miami	Saint Kitts and Nevis	0–5			2006 FIFA World Cup qualification	(Panamanian Football Federation) R. Moreno	
17 November 2004	(Mexico) Monterrey	Saint Kitts and Nevis	8–0			2006 FIFA World Cup qualification	(United States Soccer Federation) Stott	
26 January 2005	(United States) San Diego	Sweden	0–0			Friendly	(United States Soccer Federation) Hall	
9 February 2005	(Costa Rica) San José	Costa Rica	1–2			2006 FIFA World Cup qualification	(National Football Federation of Guatemala) Batres	
23 February 2005	(Mexico) Culiacan	Colombia	1–1			Friendly	(Mexican Football Federation) J. Gasso	
9 March 2005	(United States) Los Angeles	Argentina	1–1			Friendly	(United States Soccer Federation) B. Hall	
27 March 2005	Mexico City	United States	2–1			2006 FIFA World Cup qualification	(Salvadoran Football Federation) R. Sibrian	
30 March 2005	Panama City	Panama	1–1			2006 FIFA World Cup qualification	(National Autonomous Federation of Football of Honduras) J. Pineda	
27 April 2005	(United States) Chicago	Poland	1–1			Friendly	(United States Soccer Federation) M. Kennedy	
4 June 2005	Guatemala City	Guatemala	0–2			2006 FIFA World Cup qualification	(United States Soccer Federation) B. Hall	
8 June 2005	(Mexico) San Nicolás de los Garza	Trinidad and Tobago	2–0			2006 FIFA World Cup qualification	(United States Soccer Federation) K. Stott	
16 June 2005	(Germany) Hanover	Japan	1–2			2005 FIFA Confederations Cup	(Football Australia) M. Breeze	
19 June 2005	(Germany) Hanover	Brazil	1–0			2005 FIFA Confederations Cup	(Italian Football Federation) R. Rosetti	
22 June 2005	(Germany) Frankfurt	Greece	0–0			2005 FIFA Confederations Cup	(Paraguayan Football Association) Amarilla	
26 June 2005	(Germany) Hanover	Argentina	1–1 (5–6 (p))			2005 FIFA Confederations Cup	(Italian Football Federation) R. Rosetti	
29 June 2005	(Germany) Leipzig	Germany	4–3			2005 FIFA Confederations Cup	(Football Australia) Breeze	
8 July 2005	(United States) Carson	South Africa	2–1			2005 CONCACAF Gold Cup	(Salvadoran Football Federation) R. Sibrian	
10 July 2005	(United States) Los Angeles	Guatemala	4–0			2005 CONCACAF Gold Cup	(Colombian Football Federation) Ó. Ruiz	
13 July 2005	(United States) Houston	Jamaica	1–0			2005 CONCACAF Gold Cup	(Costa Rican Football Federation) W. Quesada	
17 July 2005	(United States) Houston	Colombia	1–2			2005 CONCACAF Gold Cup	(Salvadoran Football Federation) R. Sibrian	
17 August 2005	Mexico City	Costa Rica	2–0			2006 FIFA World Cup qualification	(National Autonomous Federation of Football of Honduras) J. Pineda	
3 September 2005	(United States) Columbus	United States	2–0			2006 FIFA World Cup qualification	(National Football Federation of Guatemala) Batres	
7 September 2005	Mexico City	Panama	5–0			2006 FIFA World Cup qualification	(United States Soccer Federation) B. Hall	
8 October 2005	(Mexico) San Luis Potosí	Guatemala	5–2			2006 FIFA World Cup qualification	(Jamaica Football Federation) Prendergast	
12 October 2005	(Trinidad and Tobago) Port of Spain	Trinidad and Tobago	2–1			2006 FIFA World Cup qualification	(National Autonomous Federation of Football of Honduras) J. Pineda	
26 October 2005	(Mexico) Guadalajara	Uruguay	3–1			Friendly	(Mexican Football Federation) H. Guajardo	
16 November 2005	(United States) Houston	Bulgaria	0–3			Friendly	(United States Soccer Federation) B. Hall	
14 December 2005	(United States) Phoenix	Hungary	2–0			Friendly	(United States Soccer Federation) R. Valenzuela	
25 January 2006	(United States) San Francisco	Norway	2–1			Friendly	(United States Soccer Federation) T. Vaughn	
15 February 2006	(United States) Los Angeles	South Korea	0–1			Friendly	(United States Soccer Federation) R. Salazar	
1 March 2006	(United States) Frisco	Ghana	1–0			Friendly	(United States Soccer Federation) B. Hall	
29 March 2006	(United States) Chicago	Paraguay	2–1			Friendly	(United States Soccer Federation) M. Kennedy	
5 May 2006	(United States) Pasadena	Venezuela	1–0			Friendly	(United States Soccer Federation) T. Vaughn	
12 May 2006	Mexico City	DR Congo	2–1			Friendly	(Mexican Football Federation) J. Gasso	
27 May 2006	(France) Saint-Denis	France	1–0			Friendly	(Tunisian Football Federation) M. Daami	
1 June 2006	(Netherlands) Eindhoven	Netherlands	2–1			Friendly	(Swedish Football Association) Fröjdfeldt	
11 June 2006	(Germany) Nuremberg	Iran	3–1			2006 FIFA World Cup	(Italian Football Federation) R. Rosetti	
16 June 2006	(Germany) Hanover	Angola	0–0			2006 FIFA World Cup	(Football Association of Singapore) Maidin	
21 June 2006	(Germany) Gelsenkirchen	Portugal	2–1			2006 FIFA World Cup	(Slovak Football Association) Micheľ	
24 June 2006	(Germany) Leipzig	Argentina	2–1			2006 FIFA World Cup	(Swiss Football Association) M. Busacca	
7 February 2007	(United States) Glendale	United States	2–0			Friendly	(Canadian Soccer Association) Navarro	
28 February 2007	(United States) San Diego	Venezuela	3–1			Friendly	(United States Soccer Federation) Stott	
25 March 2007	(Mexico) San Nicolás de los Garza	Paraguay	2–1			Friendly	(National Autonomous Federation of Football of Honduras) J. Pineda	
28 March 2007	(United States) Oakland	Ecuador	4–2			Friendly	(United States Soccer Federation) Toledo	
2 June 2007	(Mexico) San Luis Potosí	Iran	4–0			Friendly	(Uruguayan Football Association) R. Silvera	
5 June 2007	Mexico City	Paraguay	0–1			Friendly	(Uruguayan Football Association) J. Larrionda	
8 June 2007	(United States) East Rutherford	Cuba	2–1			2007 CONCACAF Gold Cup	(Salvadoran Football Federation) J. Aguilar	
10 June 2007	(United States) New Jersey	Honduras	1–2			2007 CONCACAF Gold Cup	(Costa Rican Football Federation) W. Quesada	
13 June 2007	(United States) Houston	Panama	1–0			2007 CONCACAF Gold Cup	(National Football Federation of Guatemala) Batres	
17 June 2007	(United States) Houston	Costa Rica	1–0			2007 CONCACAF Gold Cup	(United States Soccer Federation) T. Vaughn	
21 June 2007	(United States) Chicago	Guadeloupe	1–0			2007 CONCACAF Gold Cup	(Panamanian Football Federation) R. Moreno	
24 June 2007	(United States) Chicago	United States	1–2			2007 CONCACAF Gold Cup	(National Football Federation of Guatemala) Batres	
27 June 2007	(Venezuela) Puerto Ordaz	Brazil	2–0			2007 Copa América	(Argentine Football Association) Pezzotta	
1 July 2007	(Venezuela) Maturín	Ecuador	2–1			2007 Copa América	(Bolivian Football Federation) Ortubé	
4 July 2007	(Venezuela) Puerto la Cruz	Chile	0–0			2007 Copa América	(Paraguayan Football Association) C. Amarilla	
8 July 2007	(Venezuela) Maturín	Paraguay	6–0			2007 Copa América	(Argentine Football Association) Pezzotta	
11 July 2007	(Venezuela) Puerto Ordaz	Argentina	0–3			2007 Copa América	(Football Federation of Chile) C. Chandía	
14 July 2007	(Venezuela) Caracas	Uruguay	3–1			2007 Copa América	(Ecuadorian Football Federation) M. Reinoso	
22 August 2007	(United States) Commerce City	Colombia	0–1			Friendly	(United States Soccer Federation) K. Stott	
9 September 2007	(Mexico) Puebla	Panama	1–0			Friendly	(United States Soccer Federation) A. Prus	
12 September 2007	(United States) Foxborough	Brazil	1–3			Friendly	(United States Soccer Federation) B. Toledo	
14 October 2007	(Mexico) Ciudad Juárez	Nigeria	2–2			Friendly	(National Football Federation of Guatemala) E. Rodas	
17 October 2007	(United States) Los Angeles	Guatemala	2–3			Friendly	(United States Soccer Federation) R. Salazar	
6 February 2008	(United States) Reliant Stadium, Houston	United States	2–2 (Report)	Onyewu 29' Altidore 39'; Magallón 34', 47'		Friendly	(National Football Federation of Guatemala) C. Batres	
26 March 2008	(The Football Association) Craven Cottage, London	Ghana	1–2 (Report)	Essien 55'; Salcido 77' Pardo 86' (pen.)		Friendly	(The Football Association) Styles	
16 April 2008	(United States) Qwest Field, Seattle	China	1–0 (Report)	Villaluz 14'		Friendly	(United States Soccer Federation) B. Toledo	
4 June 2008	(United States) Qualcomm Stadium, San Diego	Argentina	1–4 (Report)	Sinha 62'; Burdisso 11', Messi 18', Rodríguez 29', Agüero 70'		Friendly	(Canadian Soccer Association) Mauricio Navarro	
8 June 2008	(United States) Soldier Field, Chicago	Peru	4–0 (Report)	Arce 5', 28'; Guardado 8'; Vela 21'		Friendly	(United States Soccer Federation) M. Geiger	
15 June 2008	(United States) Reliant Stadium, Houston	Belize	0–2 (Report)	Vela 66'; Borgetti 90+2' (pen.)		2010 FIFA World Cup qualification	(Netherlands Antillean Football Union) Javier Santillán	(Note: Belize elected to play their home leg in the United States.)
21 June 2008	(Mexico) Estadio Universitario, San Nicolás	Belize	7–0 (Report)	Vela 7'; Guardado 33'; Arce 45+1', 48'; Borgetti 62', 90+4'; Lennen 90+2' (o.g.)		2010 FIFA World Cup qualification	(Canadian Soccer Association) Silviu Petrescu	
20 August 2008	Estadio Azteca, Mexico City	Honduras	2–1 (Report)	Pardo 73', 75' de León 36'		2010 FIFA World Cup qualification	(Salvadoran Football Federation) Joel Aguilar	
6 September 2008	Estadio Azteca, Mexico City	Jamaica	3–0 (Report)	Guardado 3'; Arce 33'; Magallón 63'		2010 FIFA World Cup qualification	(United States Soccer Federation) B. Toledo	(Note: The two matches between Jamaica and Mexico had their playing dates reversed due to Hurricane Gustav.)
10 September 2008	(Mexico) Estadio Víctor Manuel Reyna, Tuxtla Gutiérrez	Canada	2–1 (Report)	Bravo 59' Márquez 73'; Gerba 78'		2010 FIFA World Cup qualification	(Trinidad and Tobago Football Association) N. Brizan	
24 September 2008	(United States) Los Angeles Memorial Coliseum, Los Angeles	Chile	0–1 (Report)	Valenzuela 75' (o.g.)		Friendly	(United States Soccer Federation) K. Stott	
11 October 2008	(Jamaica) Independence Park, Kingston	Jamaica	1–0 (Report)	Fuller 34'		2010 FIFA World Cup qualification	(Costa Rican Football Federation) W. Quesada	
15 October 2008	(Canada) Commonwealth Stadium, Edmonton	Canada	2–2 (Report)	Gerba 13', Radzinski 50'; Salcido 35', Vuoso 64'		2010 FIFA World Cup qualification	(Surinamese Football Association) E. Winjngaarde	
12 November 2008	(United States) Chase Field, Phoenix	Ecuador	2–1 (Report)	López 50'; Vuoso 90+3'; Mina 8'		Friendly	(United States Soccer Federation) A. Prus	
19 November 2008	(Honduras) Estadio Olímpico Metropolitano, San Pedro Sula	Honduras	1–0 (Report)	Osorio 52' (o.g.)		2010 FIFA World Cup qualification	(National Football Federation of Guatemala) C. Batres	
28 January 2009	(United States) Oakland–Alameda County Coliseum, Oakland	Sweden	0–1 (Report)	Farnerud 57'		Friendly	(Canadian Soccer Association) P. Ward	
11 February 2009	(United States) Columbus Crew Stadium, Columbus	United States	2–0 (Report)	Bradley 43', 90+2'		2010 FIFA World Cup qualification	(National Football Federation of Guatemala) Carlos Batres	
11 March 2009	(United States) Dick's Sporting Goods Park, Commerce City	Bolivia	5–1 (Report)	Vuoso 24', 58', Leandro 32', Santana 72' (pen.), Cárdenas 85'; Torrico 68'		Friendly	(United States Soccer Federation) B. Toledo	
28 March 2009	Estadio Azteca, Mexico City	Costa Rica	2–0 {Report}	Bravo 20'; Pardo 52' (pen.)		2010 FIFA World Cup qualification	(United States Soccer Federation) T. Vaughn	
1 April 2009	(Honduras) Estadio Olímpico Metropolitano, San Pedro Sula	Honduras	3–1 {Report}	Costly 17', 79', Pavón 43'; Castillo 82' (pen.)		2010 FIFA World Cup qualification	(Canadian Soccer Association) P. Ward	
6 June 2009	(Honduras) Estadio Cuscatlán, San Salvador	El Salvador	2–1 (Report)	Martínez 11', Quintanilla 86' (pen.); Blanco 71' (pen.)		2010 FIFA World Cup qualification	(Costa Rican Football Federation) W. Quesada	
10 June 2009	Estadio Azteca, Mexico City	Trinidad and Tobago	2–1 {Report}	Franco 1'; Rojas 48'; Tinto 45+1'		2010 FIFA World Cup qualification	(National Autonomous Federation of Football of Honduras) José Pineda	
24 June 2009	(United States) Georgia Dome, Atlanta	Venezuela	4–0 (Report)	Vela 45' dos Santos 48', 50'; Arellano 72'		Friendly	(United States Soccer Federation) T. Vaughn	
28 June 2009	(United States) Qualcomm Stadium, San Diego	Guatemala	0–0 (Report)	No Goals		Friendly	(Canadian Soccer Association) Mauricio Navarro	
5 July 2009	(United States) Oakland–Alameda County Coliseum, Oakland	Nicaragua	0–2 (Report)	Noriega 45' (pen.); Barrera 86'		2009 CONCACAF Gold Cup	(Canadian Soccer Association) P. Ward	
9 July 2009	(United States) Reliant Stadium, Houston	Panama	1–1 {Report}	Sabah 10'; Pérez 29'		2009 CONCACAF Gold Cup	(Salvadoran Football Federation) Joel Aguilar	
12 July 2009	(United States) University of Phoenix Stadium, Glendale	Guadeloupe	2–0 {Report}	Torrado 42'; Sabah 85'		2009 CONCACAF Gold Cup	(Trinidad and Tobago Football Association) Neal Brizan	
19 July 2009	(United States) Cowboys Stadium, Arlington	Haiti	4–0 (Report)	Sabah 23', 63'; Dos Santos 42'; Barerra 83'		2009 CONCACAF Gold Cup	(Jamaica Football Federation) C. Campbell	
21 July 2009	(United States) Soldier Field, Chicago	Costa Rica	(1–1 (a.e.t.) 3–5 (p) (Report)	Ledezma 90+3'; Franco 88'	Saborío (penalty scored) Borges (penalty scored) Ledezma (penalty missed) Oviedo (penalty scored); (penalty scored) Franco; (penalty scored) Dos Santos; (penalty scored) Torrado; (penalty scored) Juárez; (penalty scored) Vela	2009 CONCACAF Gold Cup	(Panamanian Football Federation) Roberto Moreno	
26 July 2009	(United States) Giants Stadium, East Rutherford	United States	0–5 (Report)	Torrado 56' (pen.); Dos Santos 62'; Vela 68'; J. A. Castro 78'; Franco 90'		2009 CONCACAF Gold Cup	(Jamaica Football Federation) Courtney Campbell	
12 August 2009	Estadio Azteca, Mexico City	United States	2–1 {Report}	Castro 19', Sabah 82'; Davies 9'		2010 FIFA World Cup qualification	(Panamanian Football Federation) Roberto Moreno	
5 September 2009	(Costa Rica) Estadio Ricardo Saprissa Aymá, San José	Costa Rica	0–3 {Report}	Dos Santos 45+1'; Franco 62'; Guardado 71'		2010 FIFA World Cup qualification	(Trinidad and Tobago Football Association) Neal Brizan	
9 September 2009	Estadio Azteca, Mexico City	Honduras	1–0 {Report}	Blanco 76' (pen.)		2010 FIFA World Cup qualification	(Jamaica Football Federation) Courtney Campbell	
30 September 2009	(United States) Cotton Bowl, Dallas	Colombia	1–2 {Report}	Aguilar 90'; Moreno 45', Quintero 81'		Friendly	(United States Soccer Federation) Ricardo Salazar	
10 October 2009	Estadio Azteca, Mexico City	El Salvador	4–1 {Report}	González 25' (o.g.), Blanco 71', Palencia 85', Vela 90'; Martínez 89'		2010 FIFA World Cup qualification	(National Football Federation of Guatemala) C. Batres	
14 October 2009	(Trinidad and Tobago) Hasely Crawford Stadium, Port of Spain	Trinidad and Tobago	2–2 {Report}	Baptiste 23' (pen.), 61'; Esqueda 57', Salcido 65'		2010 FIFA World Cup qualification	(Costa Rican Football Federation) W. Quesada	

== Results 2010–2019 ==
Date	Location and Stadium	Opponents	Score	Goals	Penalties	Competition	Referee	N and R
24 February 2010	(United States) Candlestick Park, San Francisco	Bolivia	5–0 {Report}	Barrera 2'; J. Hernández 12', 20'; Luna 18'; Aguilar 52'		Friendly	(United States Soccer Federation) T. Vaughn	
3 March 2010	(United States) Rose Bowl, Pasadena	New Zealand	2–0 {Report}	J. Hernández 53', Vela 57'		Friendly	(United States Soccer Federation) Jair Marrufo	
17 March 2010	(Mexico) Estadio Corona, Torreón	North Korea	2–1 {Report}	Blanco 50' J. Hernández 68'; Choe Kum-chol 56'		Friendly	(Panamanian Football Federation) R. Moreno	
24 March 2010	(United States) Bank of America Stadium, Charlotte	Iceland	0–0 {Report}	No Goals		Friendly	(United States Soccer Federation) M. Geiger	
7 May 2010	(United States) New Meadowlands Stadium, East Rutherford	Ecuador	0–0 (Report)	No Goals		Friendly	(Canadian Soccer Association) S. De Piero	
10 May 2010	(United States) Soldier Field, Chicago	Senegal	1–0 (Report)	Medina 60'		Friendly	(United States Soccer Federation) R. Salazar	
13 May 2010	(United States) Reliant Stadium, Houston	Angola	1–0 (Report)	Guardado 52'		Friendly	(United States Soccer Federation) B. Toledo	
16 May 2010	Estadio Azteca, Mexico City	Chile	1–0 (Report)	Medina 13'		Friendly	(United States Soccer Federation) M. Geiger	
24 May 2010	(England) Wembley Stadium, London	England	3–1 (Report)	King 17', Crouch 34', Johnson 47'; Franco 45'		Friendly	(Japan Football Association) Masaaki Toma	
26 May 2010	(Germany) Dreisamstadion, Freiburg	Netherlands	2–1 (Report)	Van Persie 17', 41'; J. Hernández 74'		Friendly	(German Football Association) Manuel Graefe	
30 May 2010	Hans-Walter Wild Stadion, Bayreuth, Germany	Gambia	5–1 (Report)	J. Hernández 17', 50', Bautista 58', 73', Medina 80'; Sohna 65'		Friendly	(German Football Association) Felix Brych	
3 June 2010	(Belgium) King Baudouin Stadium, Brussels	Italy	1–2 (Report)	Bonucci 89'; Vela 17' Medina 84'		Friendly	(Royal Belgian Football Association) Johan Verbist	
11 June 2010	(South Africa) Soccer City, Johannesburg	South Africa	1–1 Report	Tshabalala 55'; Márquez 79'		2010 FIFA World Cup	(Uzbekistan Football Association) Ravshan Irmatov	
17 June 2010	(South Africa) Peter Mokaba Stadium, Polokwane	France	0–2 Report	J. Hernández 64'; Blanco 79' (pen.)		2010 FIFA World Cup	(Saudi Arabian Football Federation) Khalil Al Ghamdi	
22 June 2010	(South Africa) Royal Bafokeng Stadium, Rustenburg	Uruguay	0–1 Report	Suárez 43'		2010 FIFA World Cup	(Hungarian Football Federation) Viktor Kassai	
27 June 2010	(South Africa) Soccer City, Johannesburg	Argentina	3–1 Report	Tevez 26', 52', Higuaín; 33'J. Hernández 71'		2010 FIFA World Cup	(Italian Football Federation) Roberto Rosetti	
11 August 2010	Estadio Azteca, Mexico City	Spain	1–1 (Report)	J. Hernández 12'; Silva 90'		Friendly	(Panamanian Football Federation) R. Moreno	
4 September 2010	(Mexico) Estadio Omnilife, Zapopan	Ecuador	1–2 Report	Checa 40' (o.g.); Benítez 1'; Ayoví 58'		Friendly	(Costa Rican Football Federation) W. Quesada	
7 September 2010	(Mexico) Estadio Universitario, San Nicolás	Colombia	1–0 Report	E. Hernández 89'		Friendly	(National Autonomous Federation of Football of Honduras) José Pineda	
12 October 2010	(Mexico) Estadio Olímpico Benito Juárez, Ciudad Juárez	Venezuela	2–2 Report	J. Hernández 34' Dos Santos 61'; Arango 6', 40'		Friendly	(Salvadoran Football Federation) Joel Aguilar	
9 February 2011	(United States) Georgia Dome, Atlanta	Bosnia and Herzegovina	2–0 Report	J. Hernández 48'; Pacheco 55'		Friendly	(United States Soccer Federation) Jair Marrufo	
26 March 2011	(United States) Oakland–Alameda County Coliseum, Oakland	Paraguay	3–1 Report	J. Hernández 7', 34'; Guardado 28'; Riveros 86'		Friendly	(Canadian Soccer Association) Paul Ward	
29 March 2011	(United States) Qualcomm Stadium, San Diego	Venezuela	1–1 Report	De Nigris 58'; Vizcarrondo 73'		Friendly	(United States Soccer Federation) Ricardo Salazar	
28 May 2011	(United States) Qwest Field, Seattle	Ecuador	1–1 Report	Torres Nilo 7'; Arroyo 37'		Friendly	(United States Soccer Federation) E. Jurisevic	
1 June 2011	(United States) Invesco Field at Mile High, Denver	New Zealand	3–0 Report	Dos Santos 22', 30'; De Nigris 43'		Friendly	(United States Soccer Federation) T. Vaughn	
5 June 2011	(United States) Cowboys Stadium, Arlington	El Salvador	5–0 Report	Juárez 55'; De Nigris 58'; J. Hernández 60', 67', 90+3' (pen.)		2011 CONCACAF Gold Cup	(Surinamese Football Association) Enrico Wijngaarde	
9 June 2011	(United States) Bank of America Stadium, Charlotte	Cuba	0–5 Report	J. Hernández 35', 76'; Dos Santos 63', 68'; De Nigris 65'		2011 CONCACAF Gold Cup	(Jamaica Football Federation) C. Campbell	
12 June 2011	(United States) Soldier Field, Chicago	Costa Rica	4–1 Report	Márquez 17'Guardado 19', 26' Barrera 38'; Ureña 69'		2011 CONCACAF Gold Cup	(Panamanian Football Federation) R. Moreno	
18 June 2011	(United States) New Meadowlands Stadium, East Rutherford	Guatemala	2–1 Report	De Nigris 48' J. Hernández 66'; Ruiz 5'		2011 CONCACAF Gold Cup	(Jamaica Football Federation) C. Campbell	
22 June 2011	(United States) Reliant Stadium, Houston	Honduras	0–2 Report	De Nigris 93'; J. Hernández 99'		2011 CONCACAF Gold Cup	(National Football Federation of Guatemala) W. López	
25 June 2011	(United States) Rose Bowl, Pasadena	United States	2–4 Report	Bradley 8' Donovan 23'; Barrera 29', 50' Guardado 36' Dos Santos 76'		2011 CONCACAF Gold Cup	(Salvadoran Football Federation) J. Aguilar	
4 July 2011	(Argentina) Estadio del Bicentenario, San Juan	Chile	2–1 Report	Paredes 66' Vidal 72'; Araujo 40'		2011 Copa América	(Venezuelan Football Federation) Juan Soto	
8 July 2011	(Argentina) Estadio Malvinas Argentinas, Mendoza	Peru	1–0 Report	Guerrero 82'		2011 Copa América	(Argentine Football Association) S. Pezzota	
12 July 2011	(Argentina) Estadio Ciudad de La Plata, La Plata	Uruguay	1–0 Report	Á. Pereira 14'		2011 Copa América	(Bolivian Football Federation) R. Orosco	
10 August 2011	(United States) Lincoln Financial Field, Philadelphia	United States	1–1 Report	Rogers 73'; Peralta 17'		Friendly	(Jamaica Football Federation) R. Bogle	
2 September 2011	(Poland) Pepsi Arena, Warsaw	Poland	1–1 Report	Brożek 26'; J. Hernández 34'		Friendly	(Romanian Football Federation) Alexandru Deaconu	
4 September 2011	(Spain) Estadi Cornellà-El Prat, Barcelona	Chile	1–0 Report	Guardado 78'		Friendly	(Royal Spanish Football Federation) C. Fernández	
11 October 2011	(Mexico) Estadio Corona, Torreón	Brazil	1–2 Report	David Luiz 10' (o.g.); Ronaldinho 79' Marcelo 84'		Friendly	(Salvadoran Football Federation) M. Mejía	
11 November 2011	(Mexico) Estadio Corregidora, Querétaro	Serbia	2–0 Report	Salcido 2'; J. Hernández 88' (pen.)		Friendly	(National Football Federation of Guatemala) W. López	
25 January 2012	(United States) Reliant Stadium, Houston	Venezuela	3–1 Report	Salcido 68'; Márquez Lugo 88'; Peralta 89'; Greco 51'		Friendly	(United States Soccer Federation) E. Jurisevic	
29 February 2012	(United States) Sun Life Stadium, Miami Gardens	Colombia	0–2 Report	Falcao 36' Cuadrado 59'		Friendly	(United States Soccer Federation) T. Vaughn	
27 May 2012	(United States) MetLife Stadium, East Rutherford	Wales	2–0 Report	De Nigris 43', 88'		Friendly	(United States Soccer Federation) R. Salazar	
31 May 2012	(United States) Soldier Field, Chicago	Bosnia and Herzegovina	2–1 Report	Dos Santos 6' J. Hernández 90+2'; Džeko 29'		Friendly	(United States Soccer Federation) T. Vaughn	
3 June 2012	(United States) Cowboys Stadium, Arlington	Brazil	2–0 Report	Dos Santos 21'; J. Hernández 32'		Friendly	(Canadian Soccer Association) S. Petrescu	
8 June 2012	Estadio Azteca, Mexico City	Guyana	3–1 Report	Salcido 11' Dos Santos 15' J. Hernández 51'; Moreno 62' (o.g.)		2014 FIFA World Cup qualification	(Puerto Rican Football Federation) J. Santos	
12 June 2012	(El Salvador) Estadio Cuscatlán, San Salvador	El Salvador	1–2 Report	Pacheco 65'; Zavala 60' Moreno 82'		2014 FIFA World Cup qualification	(National Autonomous Federation of Football of Honduras) J. Pineda	
15 August 2012	Estadio Azteca, Mexico City	United States	0–1 Report	Orozco 79'		Friendly	(Costa Rican Football Federation) W. Quesada	
7 September 2012	Estadio Nacional de Costa Rica, San José	Costa Rica	0–2 Report	Salcido 43'; Zavala 52'		2014 FIFA World Cup qualification	(Panamanian Football Federation) R. Moreno	
11 September 2012	Estadio Azteca, Mexico City	Costa Rica	1–0 Report	J. Hernández 60'		2014 FIFA World Cup qualification	(Jamaica Football Federation) C. Campbell	
12 October 2012	(United States) BBVA Compass Stadium, Houston	Guyana	0–5 Report	Guardado 77'; Peralta 79'; Pollard 83' (o.g.); J. Hernández 84'; Reyna 86'		2014 FIFA World Cup qualification	(National Football Federation of Guatemala) W. López	
16 October 2012	(Mexico) Estadio Corona, Torreón	El Salvador	2–0 Report	Peralta 64'; J. Hernández 85'		2014 FIFA World Cup qualification	(Panamanian Football Federation) J. Perea	
30 January 2013	(United States) University of Phoenix Stadium, Glendale	Denmark	1–1 Report	Fabián 67' (pen.); Cornelius 83' (pen.)		Friendly	(United States Soccer Federation) Chris Penso	
6 February 2013	Estadio Azteca, Mexico City	Jamaica	0–0	No Goals		2014 FIFA World Cup qualification	(United States Soccer Federation) M. Geiger	
22 March 2013	(Honduras) Estadio Olímpico Metropolitano, San Pedro Sula	Honduras	2–2	Costly 77'Bengtson 80'; J. Hernández 28', 54'		2014 FIFA World Cup qualification	(Jamaica Football Federation) C. Campbell	
26 March 2013	Estadio Azteca, Mexico City	United States	0–0	No Goals		2014 FIFA World Cup qualification	(National Football Federation of Guatemala) W. López	
17 April 2013	(United States) Candlestick Park, San Francisco	Peru	0–0 Report	No Goals		Friendly	(United States Soccer Federation) R. Salazar	
31 May 2013	(United States) Reliant Stadium, Houston	Nigeria	2–2 Report	J. Hernández 20', 70'; Ideye 27' (pen.) Ugochukwu 39'		Friendly	(United States Soccer Federation) B. Toledo	
4 June 2013	(Jamaica) Independence Park, Kingston	Jamaica	0–1	De Nigris 48'		2014 FIFA World Cup qualification	(Salvadoran Football Federation) Joel Aguilar	
7 June 2013	Estadio Rommel Fernández, Panama City	Panama	0–0	No Goals		2014 FIFA World Cup qualification	(Costa Rican Football Federation) W. Quesada	
11 June 2013	Estadio Azteca, Mexico City	Costa Rica	0–0	No Goals		2014 FIFA World Cup qualification	(United States Soccer Federation) M. Geiger	
16 June 2013	(Brazil) Estádio do Maracanã, Rio de Janeiro	Italy	1–2 Report	J. Hernández 34' (pen.); Pirlo 27' Balotelli 78'		2013 FIFA Confederations Cup	(Chile) E. Osses	
19 June 2013	(Brazil) Estádio Castelão, Fortaleza	Brazil	2–0 Report	Neymar 9'; Jô 90+3'		2013 FIFA Confederations Cup	(The Football Association) H. Webb	
22 June 2013	(Brazil) Estádio Mineirão, Belo Horizonte	Japan	1–2 Report	Okazaki 87'; J. Hernández 55', 67'		2013 FIFA Confederations Cup	(German Football Association) F. Brych	
7 July 2013	(United States) Rose Bowl, Pasadena	Panama	1–2 Report	Fabián 45+2'; G. Torres 7' (pen.), 48'		2013 CONCACAF Gold Cup	(Costa Rican Football Federation) W. Quesada	
11 July 2013	(United States) CenturyLink Field, Seattle	Canada	2–0 Report	R. Jiménez 42'; Fabián 57' (pen.)		2013 CONCACAF Gold Cup	(Salvadoran Football Federation) Joel Aguilar	
14 July 2013	(United States) Sports Authority Field at Mile High, Denver	Martinique	1–3 Report	Parsemain 43' (pen.); Fabián 21', Montes 34', Ponce 90'		2013 CONCACAF Gold Cup	(United States Soccer Federation) Mark Geiger	
20 July 2013	(United States) Georgia Dome, Atlanta	Trinidad and Tobago	1–0 Report	R. Jiménez 84'		2013 CONCACAF Gold Cup	(El Salvador) Joel Aguilar	
24 July 2013	(United States) Cowboys Stadium, Arlington	Panama	2–1 Report	B. Pérez 13' R. Torres 61'; Montes 26'		2013 CONCACAF Gold Cup	(Jamaica Football Federation) C. Campbell	
14 August 2013	(United States) MetLife Stadium, East Rutherford	Ivory Coast	4–1 Report	Boka 10' (o.g.) Peralta 28', 45' Reyna 90'; Drogba 62'		Friendly	(Canadian Soccer Association) D. Gantar	
6 September 2013	Estadio Azteca, Mexico City	Honduras	1–2	Peralta 5'; Bengtson 63' Costly 66'		2014 FIFA World Cup qualification	(Panamanian Football Federation) R. Moreno	
10 September 2013	(United States) Columbus Crew Stadium, Columbus	United States	2–0	Johnson 49' Donovan 79'		2014 FIFA World Cup qualification	(Jamaica Football Federation) C. Campbell	
11 October 2013	Estadio Azteca, Mexico City	Panama	2–1	Peralta 39' Jimenez 85'; Tejada 81'		2014 FIFA World Cup qualification	(Salvadoran Football Federation) Joel Aguilar	
15 October 2013	Estadio Nacional de Costa Rica, San José	Costa Rica	2–1	Ruiz 26' Saborío 64'; Peralta 29'		2014 FIFA World Cup qualification	(National Football Federation of Guatemala) W. López	
30 October 2013	(United States) Qualcomm Stadium, San Diego	Finland	4–2 Report	Márquez 11' Peña 23' Peralta 46' Escoboza 64'; Hurme 28'; Valenzuela 55' (o.g.)		Friendly	(United States Soccer Federation) E. Jurisevic	
13 November 2013	Estadio Azteca, Mexico City	New Zealand	5–1 Report	Aguilar 32' Jiménez 40' Peralta 48', 80' Márquez 84'; James 85'		2014 FIFA World Cup qualification	(Hungarian Football Federation) V. Kassai	
20 November 2013	(New Zealand) Westpac Stadium, Wellington	New Zealand	2–4	James 80' Fallon 84'; Peralta 20', 29', 36'; Peña 87'		2014 FIFA World Cup qualification	(German Football Association) F. Brych	
29 January 2014	(United States) Alamodome, San Antonio	South Korea	4–0 Report	Peralta 37'; Pulido 45+1', 86', 89'		Friendly	(National Autonomous Federation of Football of Honduras) H. Rodríguez	
5 March 2014	(United States) Georgia Dome, Atlanta	Nigeria	0–0 Report	No Goals		Friendly	(Costa Rican Football Federation) W. Quesada	
2 April 2014	(United States) University of Phoenix Stadium, Glendale	United States	2–2 Report	Bradley 15' Wondolowski 28'; Márquez 49' Pulido 67'		Friendly	(Panamanian Football Federation) R. Moreno	
28 May 2014	Estadio Azteca, Mexico City	Israel	3–0 Report	Layún 43', 62'; Fabián 85'		Friendly	(Salvadoran Football Federation) E. Bonilla	
31 May 2014	(United States) Cowboys Stadium, Arlington, Texas	Ecuador	3–1 Report	Montes 33' Fabián 69' Banguera 76' (o.g.); Valencia 80'		Friendly	(Panamanian Football Federation) J. Pitti	
3 June 2014	(United States) Soldier Field, Chicago	Bosnia and Herzegovina	0–1 Report	Hajrović 41'		Friendly	(National Football Federation of Guatemala) Ó. Reyna	
6 June 2014	(United States) Gillette Stadium, Foxborough, Massachusetts	Portugal	0–1 Report	Bruno Alves 90+3'		Friendly	(Costa Rican Football Federation) J. Solis	
13 June 2014	(Brazil) Arena das Dunas, Natal	Cameroon	1–0 Report	Peralta 61'		2014 FIFA World Cup	(Colombian Football Federation) W. Roldán	
17 June 2014	(Brazil) Estádio Castelão, Fortaleza	Brazil	0–0 Report	No Goals		2014 FIFA World Cup	(Turkish Football Federation) Cüneyt Çakır	
23 June 2014	(Brazil) Arena Pernambuco, Recife	Croatia	1–3 Report	Perišić 87'; Márquez 72' Guardado 75' J. Hernández 82'		2014 FIFA World Cup	(Uzbekistan Football Association) Ravshan Irmatov	
29 June 2014	(Brazil) Estádio Castelão, Fortaleza	Netherlands	2–1 Report	Sneijder 88' Huntelaar 90+4' (pen.); Dos Santos 48'		2014 FIFA World Cup	(Portuguese Football Federation) Pedro Proença	
6 September 2014	(United States) Levi's Stadium, Santa Clara	Chile	0–0 Report	No Goals		Friendly	(United States Soccer Federation) J. Guzmán	
9 September 2014	(United States) Dick's Sporting Goods Park, Commerce City	Bolivia	1–0 Report	Layún 18'		Friendly	(United States Soccer Federation) Chris Penso	
9 October 2014	(Mexico) Estadio Víctor Manuel Reyna, Tuxtla Gutiérrez	Honduras	2–0 Report	J. Hernández 22'; Alanís 37'		Friendly	(Costa Rican Football Federation) Wálter Quesada	
12 October 2014	(Mexico) Estadio Corregidora, Querétaro	Panama	1–0 Report	Torres 89'		Friendly	(Salvadoran Football Federation) Joel Aguilar	
12 November 2014	(Netherlands) Amsterdam Arena, Amsterdam	Netherlands	2–3 Report	Sneijder 49' Blind 74'; Vela 8', 62' J. Hernández 69'		Friendly	(Polish Football Association) Szymon Marciniak	
18 November 2014	(Belarus) Borisov Arena, Borisov	Belarus	3–2 Report	Kislyak 51', Signevich 55', Nyakhaychyk 81'; R. Jiménez 48', 53'		Friendly	(Russian Football Union) Sergey Ivanov	
28 March 2015	(United States) Los Angeles Memorial Coliseum, Los Angeles	Ecuador	1–0 Report	J. Hernández 14'		Friendly	(Football Federation of Belize) C. Reid	
31 March 2015	(United States) Arrowhead Stadium, Kansas City	Paraguay	1–0 Report	Herrera 3'		Friendly	(National Football Federation of Guatemala) W. López	
15 April 2015	(United States) Alamodome, San Antonio	United States	2–0 Report	Morris 49'; Agudelo 72'		Friendly	(Costa Rican Football Federation) R. Montero	
30 May 2015	(Mexico) Estadio Víctor Manuel Reyna, Tuxtla Gutiérrez	Guatemala	3–0 Report	Herrera 30', 63'; Corona 74'		Friendly	(United States Soccer Federation) B. Toledo	
3 June 2015	(Peru) Estadio Nacional de Lima, Lima	Peru	1–1 Report	Farfán 62'; Valenzuela 75'		Friendly	(Ecuadorian Football Federation) Omar Ponce	
7 June 2015	(Brazil) Allianz Parque, São Paulo	Brazil	2–0 Report	Coutinho 28'; Tardelli 37'		Friendly	(Paraguayan Football Association) Julio Quintana	
12 June 2015	(Chile) Estadio Sausalito, Viña del Mar	Bolivia	0–0 Report	No Goals		CA 2015 GS	(Paraguayan Football Association) Enrique Cáceres	
15 June 2015	(Chile) Estadio Nacional, Santiago	Chile	3–3 Report	Vidal 22', 55' Vargas 42'; Vuoso 21', 66'; Jiménez 29'		CA 2015 GS	(Peruvian Football Federation) V. Cariilo	
19 June 2015	(Chile) Estadio El Teniente, Rancagua	Ecuador	1–2 Report	Jiménez 64'; Bolaños 26' Valencia 57'		CA 2015 GS	(Venezuelan Football Federation) José Argote	
27 June 2015	(United States) Orlando Citrus Bowl, Orlando, Florida	Costa Rica	2–2 Report	Dos Santos 53' J. Hernández 55'; Ramírez 4' Layún 36' (o.g.)		Friendly	(United States Soccer Federation) E. Jurisevic	
1 July 2015	(United States) NRG Stadium, Houston	Honduras	0–0 Report	No Goals		Friendly	(United States) A. Villareal	
9 July 2015	(United States) Soldier Field, Chicago	Cuba	6–0 Report	Peralta 17', 37', 62' Vela 22' Guardado 44' dos Santos 75'		Gold Cup 2015 GS	(Costa Rica) Walter Quesada	
12 July 2015	(United States) University of Phoenix Stadium, Phoenix	Guatemala	0–0 Report	No Goals		Gold Cup 2015 GS	(National Autonomous Federation of Football of Honduras) Armando Castro	
15 July 2015	(United States) Bank of America Stadium, Charlotte, North Carolina	Trinidad and Tobago	4–4 Report	Aguilar 32' Vela 51' Guardado 88' Jones 90' (o.g.); Cummings 55', 67' Jones 58' Marshall 90+3'		Gold Cup 2015 GS	(United States Soccer Federation) Mark Geiger	
19 July 2015	(United States) MetLife Stadium, East Rutherford, New Jersey	Costa Rica	1–0 Report	Guardado 120+4'		Gold Cup 2015 QF	(National Football Federation of Guatemala) W. López	
22 July 2015	(United States) Georgia Dome, Atlanta	Panama	1–2 Report	Torres 57'; Andrés Guardado 90+10', 105+1'		Gold Cup 2015 SF	(United States Soccer Federation) Mark Geiger	
26 July 2015	(United States) Lincoln Financial Field, Philadelphia	Jamaica	1–3 Report	Mattocks 80'; Guardado 31' Corona 47' Peralta 61'		2015 CONCACAF Gold Cup final	(Salvadoran Football Federation) Joel Aguilar	
4 September 2015	(United States) Rio Tinto Stadium, Sandy	Trinidad and Tobago	3–3 Report	Esquivel 41' Jiménez 56' Herrera 85'; Glenn 7' Cummings 39' Jones 69'		Friendly	(Barbados Football Association) Adrian Skeete	
8 September 2015	(United States) AT&T Stadium, Arlington	Argentina	2–2 Report	Agüero 85' Messi 89'; J. Hernández 19' Herrera 70'		Friendly	(United States Soccer Federation) Ricardo Salazar	
10 October 2015	(United States) Rose Bowl Stadium, Pasadena	United States	3–2 Report	Hernández 10' Peralta 96' Aguilar 118'; Cameron 15' Wood 108'		2015 CONCACAF Cup	(Salvadoran Football Federation) Joel Aguilar	
13 October 2015	(Mexico) Estadio Nemesio Díez, Toluca	Panama	1–0 Report	Vela 45'		Friendly	(National Autonomous Federation of Football of Honduras) Ó. Moncada	
13 November 2015	Estadio Azteca, Mexico City	El Salvador	3–0 Report	Guardado 7'; Herrera 42'; Vela 64'		2018 FIFA WCQ R4	(National Football Federation of Guatemala) W. López	
17 November 2015	(National Autonomous Federation of Football of Honduras) Estadio Olímpico Metropolitano, San Pedro Sula	Honduras	0–2 Report	Corona 67'; Damm 72'		2018 FIFA WCQ R4	(Panamanian Football Federation) John Pitti	
10 February 2016	(United States) Marlins Park, Miami	Senegal	2–0	Dueñas 73'; Pizarro 87'		Friendly	(United States Soccer Federation) Jair Marrufo	
25 March 2016	(Canada) BC Place, Vancouver	Canada	0–3 Report	J. Hernández 31'; Lozano 39'; J. M. Corona 72'		2018 FIFA WCQ R4	(St. Kitts and Nevis Football Association) Kimbell Ward	
29 March 2016	Estadio Azteca, Mexico City	Canada	2–0 Report	Guardado 18' (pen.); J. M. Corona 45+4'		2018 FIFA WCQ R4	(Football Association of Cuba) Yadel Martínez	
28 May 2016	(United States) Georgia Dome, Atlanta	Paraguay	1–0 Report	Guardado 32'		Friendly	(United States Soccer Federation) Edvin Jurisevic	
1 June 2016	(United States) Qualcomm Stadium, San Diego	Chile	1–0 Report	J. Hernández 86'		Friendly	(United States Soccer Federation) Baldomero Toledo	
5 June 2016	(United States) University of Phoenix Stadium, Glendale, Arizona	Uruguay	3–1 Report (CONMEBOL); Report (CONCACAF)	Á. Pereira 4' (o.g.) Márquez 85' H. Herrera 90+2'; Godín 74'		CAC 2016	(Paraguayan Football Association) Enrique Cáceres	
9 June 2016	(United States) Rose Bowl, Pasadena	Jamaica	2–0 Report (CONMEBOL); Report (CONCACAF)	J. Hernández 18'; Peralta 81'		CAC 2016	(Brazilian Football Confederation) Wilton Sampaio	
13 June 2016	(United States) NRG Stadium, Houston	Venezuela	1–1 Report (CONMEBOL); Report (CONCACAF)	J. M. Corona 80'; Velázquez 10'		CAC 2016	(Cuba) Yadel Martínez	
18 June 2016	(United States) Levi's Stadium, Santa Clara	Chile	0–7 Report (CONMEBOL); Report (CONCACAF)	Puch 16', 88'; Vargas 44', 52', 57', 74'; Sánchez 49'		CAC 2016	(Brazilian Football Confederation) Héber Lopes	
2 September 2016	(El Salvador) Estadio Cuscatlán, San Salvador	El Salvador	1–3 Report	Larín 24' (pen.); Moreno 52' Sepúlveda 58' Jiménez 73' (pen.)		2018 FIFA WCQ R4	(United States Soccer Federation) A. Villarreal	
6 September 2016	Estadio Azteca, Mexico City	Honduras	0–0 Report	No Goals		2018 FIFA WCQ R4	(United States) Mark Geiger	
8 October 2016	(Mexico) Nissan Stadium, Nashville	New Zealand	2–1 Report	G. Dos Santos 29' (pen.) Fabián 56'; Rojas 46'		Friendly	(United States Soccer Federation) Jair Marrufo	
11 October 2016	(United States) Toyota Park, Bridgeview	Panama	1–0 int.soccerway.com	Peralta 59'		Friendly	(United States Soccer Federation) Ted Unkel	
11 November 2016	(United States) Mapfre Stadium, Columbus	United States	1–2 Report	Wood 49'; Layún 20' Márquez 89'		2018 FIFA WCQ R5	(National Football Federation of Guatemala) W. López	
15 November 2016	Estadio Rommel Fernández, Panama City	Panama	0–0 Report	No Goals		2018 FIFA WCQ R5	(Costa Rican Football Federation) Ricardo Montero	
8 February 2017	(United States) Sam Boyd Stadium, Whitney	Iceland	1–0 Report	Pulido 21'		Friendly	(United States Soccer Federation) Jair Marrufo	
24 March 2017	Estadio Azteca, Mexico City	Costa Rica	2–0 Report	Ja. Hernández 7'; Araujo 45'		2018 FIFA WCQ R5	(Panamanian Football Federation) John Pitti	
28 March 2017	(Trinidad and Tobago) Hasely Crawford Stadium, Port of Spain	Trinidad and Tobago	0–1 Report	D. Reyes 58'		2018 FIFA WCQ R5	(Jamaica Football Federation) V. Legister	
27 May 2017	(United States) Los Angeles Memorial Coliseum, Los Angeles	Croatia	1–2 Report	Ja. Hernández 87'; Čop 36', Tudor 37'		Friendly	(United States Soccer Federation) Baldomero Toledo	
1 June 2017	(United States) East Rutherford, MetLife Stadium	Republic of Ireland	3–1 Report	J. M. Corona 16' Jiménez 25' (pen.) Vela 54'; Gleeson 76'		Friendly	(United States Soccer Federation) Ted Unkel	
8 June 2017	Estadio Azteca, Mexico City	Honduras	3–0 Report	Alanís 34'; Lozano 63'; Jiménez 66'		2018 FIFA WCQ R5	(Canadian Soccer Association) Drew Fischer	
11 June 2017	Estadio Azteca, Mexico City	United States	1–1 Report	Vela 23'; Bradley 6'		2018 FIFA WCQ R5	(Salvadoran Football Federation) Joel Aguilar	
18 June 2017	(Russia) Kazan Arena, Kazan	Portugal	2–2 Report	Quaresma 34', Cédric 86'; Ja. Hernández 42', Moreno 90+1'		FCC 2017 Group A	(Argentine Football Association) Néstor Pitana	
21 June 2017	(Russia) Fisht Olympic Stadium, Sochi	New Zealand	2–1 Report	Jiménez 54' Peralta 72'; Wood 42'		FCC 2017 Group A	(Gambia Football Federation) Bakary Gassama	
24 June 2017	(Russia) Kazan Arena, Kazan	Russia	2–1 Report	Araujo 30'Lozano 52'; Samedov 25'		FCC 2017 Group A	(Saudi Arabian Football Federation) Fahad Al-Mirdasi	
28 June 2017	(United States) NRG Stadium, Houston	Ghana	1–0 Report	E. Hernández 32' (pen.)		Friendly	(United States Soccer Federation) B. Toledo	
29 June 2017	(Russia) Fisht Olympic Stadium, Sochi	Germany	4–1 Report	Goretzka 6', 8' Werner 59' Younes 90+1'; Fabián 89'		FCC 2017 Knockout stage	(Argentine Football Association) Néstor Pitana	
1 July 2017	(United States) CenturyLink Field, Seattle	Paraguay	2–1 Report	Pizarro 19' E. Hernández 26' (pen.); Bareiro 45+2'		Friendly	(United States Soccer Federation) Ted Unkel	
2 July 2017	(Russia) Otkrytiye Arena, Moscow	Portugal	2–1 (a.e.t) Report	Pepe 90+1' Adrien 105' (pen.); Neto 54' (o.g.)		FCC 2017 3rd Place	(Saudi Arabian Football Federation) Fahad Al-Mirdasi	
9 July 2017	(United States) Qualcomm Stadium, San Diego	El Salvador	3–1 Report	Marín 8', E. Hernández 29', Pineda 55'; Bonilla 10'		CGC 2017	(National Autonomous Federation of Football of Honduras) Ó. Moncada	
13 July 2017	(United States) Sports Authority Field at Mile High Denver	Jamaica	0–0 Report	No Goals		CGC 2017	(Costa Rican Football Federation) R. Montero	
16 July 2017	(United States) Alamodome, San Antonio	Curaçao	0–2 Report	Sepúlveda 22'; Álvarez 90+1'		CGC 2017	(St. Kitts and Nevis Football Association) Kimbell Ward	
20 July 2017	(United States) University of Phoenix Stadium, Glendale	Honduras	1–0 Report	Pizarro 4'		CGC 2017 knockout stage	(National Football Federation of Guatemala) W. López	
23 July 2017	(United States) Rose Bowl, Pasadena	Jamaica	1–0 Report	Lawrence 88'		CGC 2017 knockout stage	(Panamanian Football Federation) John Pitti	
1 September 2017	Estadio Azteca, Mexico City	Panama	1–0 Report	Lozano 53'		2018 FIFA WCQ R5	(National Football Federation of Guatemala) W. López	
5 September 2017	Estadio Nacional de Costa Rica, San José	Costa Rica	1–1	Ureña 83'; Gamboa 42' (o.g.)		2018 FIFA WCQ R5	(United States Soccer Federation) Mark Geiger	
6 October 2017	(Mexico) Estadio Alfonso Lastras, San Luis Potosí	Trinidad and Tobago	3–1	Lozano 78' J. Hernández 88' Herrera 90+4'; Winchester 66'		2018 FIFA WCQ R5	(St. Kitts and Nevis Football Association) Kimbell Ward	
10 October 2017	(Honduras) Estadio Olímpico Metropolitano, San Pedro Sula	Honduras	3–2	Elis 34', Ochoa 53' (o.g.), Quioto 60'; Peralta 17' Vela 37'		2018 FIFA WCQ R5	(Salvadoran Football Federation) Joel Aguilar	
10 November 2017	(Belgium) King Baudouin Stadium, Brussels	Belgium	3–3 Report	E. Hazard 17', Lukaku 55', 70'; Guardado 38' Lozano 56', 60'		Friendly	(Italian Football Federation) Paolo Mazzoleni	
13 November 2017	(Poland) Stadion Energa Gdańsk, Gdańsk	Poland	0–1 Report	Jiménez 13'		Friendly	(Austrian Football Association) Oliver Drachta	
31 January 2018	(United States) Alamodome, San Antonio	Bosnia and Herzegovina	1–0	Ayala 65'		Friendly	(United States Soccer Federation) Jair Marrufo	
23 March 2018	(United States) Levi's Stadium, Santa Clara	Iceland	3–0	Fabián 37' Layún 64', 90+1'		Friendly	(United States Soccer Federation) A. Villarreal	
27 March 2018	(United States) AT&T Stadium, Arlington	Croatia	0–1	Rakitić 62' (pen.)		Friendly	(National Football Federation of Guatemala) Mario Escobar	
28 May 2018	(United States) Rose Bowl, Pasadena	Wales	0–0	No Goals		Friendly	(United States Soccer Federation) A. Villarreal	
2 June 2018	Estadio Azteca, Mexico City	Scotland	1–0	G. dos Santos 13'		Friendly	(Costa Rican Football Federation) Henry Bejarano	
9 June 2018	(Denmark) Brøndby Stadium, Brøndby	Denmark	2–0	Poulsen 71'; Eriksen 74'		Friendly	(Norwegian Football Federation) Kai Erik Steen	
17 June 2018	(Russia) Luzhniki Stadium, Moscow	Germany	0–1	Lozano 35'		2018 FIFA World Cup	(Football Federation Islamic Republic of Iran) Alireza Faghani	
23 June 2018	(Russia) Rostov Arena, Rostov-on-Don	South Korea	1–2	Son Heung-min 90+3'; Vela 26' (pen.) Hernández 66'		2018 FIFA World Cup	(Football Association of Serbia) Milorad Mažić	
27 June 2018	(Russia) Central Stadium, Yekaterinburg	Sweden	0–3	Augustinsson 50', Granqvist 62' (pen.), Álvarez 74' (o.g.)		2018 FIFA World Cup	(Argentine Football Association) Néstor Pitana	
2 July 2018	(Russia) Cosmos Arena, Samara	Brazil	2–0	Neymar 51'; Firmino 88'		2018 FIFA World Cup	(Italian Football Federation) Gianluca Rocchi	
7 September 2018	(United States) NRG Stadium, Houston	Uruguay	1–4	Jiménez 25' (pen.); Giménez 21', Suárez 32', 40' (pen.), Pereiro 59'		Friendly	(United States Soccer Federation) Ismail Elfath	
11 September 2018	(United States) Nissan Stadium, Nashville	United States	1–0	Adams 71'		Friendly	(Costa Rican Football Federation) Ricardo Montero	
11 October 2018	(Mexico) Estadio Universitario, San Nicolás de los Garza	Costa Rica	3–2	Guzmán 33', Martín 56', Jiménez 71' (pen.); Campbell 29', Ruiz 44' (pen.)		Friendly	(National Autonomous Federation of Football of Honduras) Óscar Moncada	
16 October 2018	(Mexico) Estadio Corregidora, Querétaro	Chile	0–1	Castillo 89'		Friendly	(Salvadoran Football Federation) Joel Aguilar	
16 November 2018	(Argentina) Estadio Mario Alberto Kempes, Córdoba	Argentina	2–0	Funes Mori 44'; Brizuela 83' (o.g.)		Friendly	(Uruguayan Football Association) Esteban Ostojich	
20 November 2018	(Argentina) Estadio Malvinas Argentinas, Mendoza	Argentina	2–0	Icardi 2'; Dybala 87'		Friendly	(Colombian Football Federation) Andrés Rojas	
22 March 2019	(United States) SDCCU Stadium, San Diego	Chile	3–1	Jiménez 52' (pen.), Moreno 64', H. Lozano 65'; Castillo 69'		Friendly	(United States Soccer Federation) Ted Unkel	
26 March 2019	(United States) Levi's Stadium Santa Clara	Paraguay	4–2	dos Santos 6', Gómez 9' (o.g.), J. Hernández 24', L. Montes 90+1'; Pérez 54', D. González 84'		Friendly	(Costa Rican Football Federation) Keylor Herrera	
5 June 2019	(United States) Mercedes-Benz Stadium Atlanta	Venezuela	3–1	Alvarado 32', Pizarro 54', Guardado 76'; Murillo 18'		Friendly	(United States Soccer Federation) Ted Unkel	
9 June 2019	(United States) AT&T Stadium, Arlington	Ecuador	3–2	Dos Santos 28', L. Montes 63', L. Rodríguez 77'; Mena 47', Preciado 66'		Friendly	(Canadian Soccer Association) David Gantar	
15 June 2019	(United States) Rose Bowl, Pasadena	Cuba	7–0	Antuna 2', 44', 80', Jiménez 31', 64', Reyes 38', Vega 74'		2019 CONCACAF Gold Cup	(Panamanian Football Federation) John Pitti	
19 June 2019	(United States) Broncos Stadium at Mile High, Denver	Canada	3–1	Alvarado 40', Guardado 54', 77'; Cavallini 75'		2019 CONCACAF Gold Cup	(Costa Rican Football Federation) Henry Bejarano	
23 June 2019	(United States) Bank of America Stadium, Charlotte	Martinique	2–3	Parsemain 56', Delem 84'; Antuna 29', Jiménez 61', Navarro 72'		2019 CONCACAF Gold Cup	(Salvadoran Football Federation) Iván Barton	
29 June 2019	(United States) NRG Stadium, Houston	Costa Rica	(1–1 (a.e.t.) 5–4 (p)	Jiménez 44'; Ruiz 52' (pen.)	Jiménez (penalty missed) , L. Montes (penalty scored) , Alvarado (penalty scored) , Gallardo (penalty scored) , Moreno (penalty scored) , Salcedo (penalty scored); (penalty scored) Borges, (penalty scored) Aguilar, (penalty missed) Leal, (penalty scored) Duarte, (penalty scored) Calvo, (penalty missed) Fuller	2019 CONCACAF Gold Cup	(Panamanian Football Federation) John Pitti	
2 July 2019	(United States) State Farm Stadium, Glendale	Haiti	0–1 (a.e.t.)	Jiménez 93' (pen.)		2019 CONCACAF Gold Cup	(Qatar Football Association) Abdulrahman Al-Jassim	
7 July 2019	(United States) Soldier Field, Chicago	United States	1–0	Dos Santos 73'		2019 CONCACAF Gold Cup final	(National Football Federation of Guatemala) Mario Escobar	
6 September 2019	(United States) MetLife Stadium, East Rutherford	United States	0–3	J. Hernández, 21' Gutiérrez 78', Antuna 82'		Friendly	(Salvadoran Football Federation) Joel Aguilar	
11 September 2019	(United States) Alamodome, San Antonio	Argentina	4–0	Martínez 17', 22', 39', Paredes 33' (pen.)		Friendly	(National Autonomous Federation of Football of Honduras) Saíd Martínez	
2 October 2019	(Mexico) Estadio Nemesio Díez, Toluca	Trinidad and Tobago	2–0	Macías 23'; J. Angulo 31'		Friendly	(Panamanian Football Federation) O. Vergara	
11 October 2019	Bermuda National Stadium, Devonshire Parish	Bermuda	1–5	Wells 56'; Antuna 25', Macías 45+2', 53', H. Lozano 60' Herrera 71'		CNL 2019–20	(Costa Rican Football Federation) Henry Bejarano	
15 October 2019	Estadio Azteca, Mexico City	Panama	3–1	Alvarado 28', Macías 75', Pizarro 90+2'; Salcedo 42' (o.g.)		CNL 2019–20	(Salvadoran Football Federation) Iván Barton	
15 November 2019	Estadio Rommel Fernández, Panama City	Panama	0–3	Jiménez 8', 85' (pen.), Álvarez 70'		CNL 2019/20	(Costa Rican Football Federation) Ricardo Montero	
19 November 2019	(Mexico) Estadio Nemesio Díez, Toluca	Bermuda	2–1	Córdova 27', Antuna 90+3'; Leverock 10'		CNL 2019/20	(Salvadoran Football Federation) Ismael Cornejo	

== Results 2020–present ==
Date	Location and Stadium	Opponents	Score	Goals	Penalties	Competition	Referee	N and R
30 September 2020	Estadio Azteca, Mexico City	Guatemala	3–0	Martín 6', Pineda 28', Córdova 36'		Friendly	(Mexican Football Federation) Fernando Hernández	
7 October 2020	Johan Cruyff Arena, Amsterdam, Netherlands	Netherlands	0–1	Jiménez 60' (pen.)		Friendly	(Football Association of Serbia) Srđan Jovanović	
13 October 2020	(Netherlands) Cars Jeans Stadion, The Hague	Algeria	2–2	Corona 43', D. Lainez 86'; Bennacer 45', Mahrez 67'		Friendly	(Royal Dutch Football Association) Bas Nijhuis	
14 November 2020	(Austria) Stadion Wiener Neustadt, Wiener Neustadt	South Korea	3–2	Jiménez 67', Antuna 69', Salcedo 70'; Hwang 20', Kwon 87'		Friendly	(Austrian Football Association) Harald Lechner	
17 November 2020	(Austria) Merkur-Arena, Graz	Japan	0–2	Jiménez 63' Lozano 68'		Friendly	(Austrian Football Association) Manuel Schüttengruber	
27 March 2021	(Wales) Cardiff City Stadium, Cardiff	Wales	1–0	Moore 11'		Friendly	(Irish Football Association) Ian McNabb	
30 March 2021	(Austria) Stadion Wiener Neustadt, Wiener Neustadt	Costa Rica	0–1	Lozano 89'		Friendly	(Austrian Football Association) Christian-Petru Ciochirca	
29 May 2021	(United States) AT&T Stadium, Arlington	Iceland	2–1	Lozano 73', 78'; Álvarez 14' (o.g.)		Friendly	(United States Soccer Federation) Ted Unkel	
3 June 2021	(United States) Empower Field at Mile High, Denver	Costa Rica	(0–0) 5–4 (p)	No Goals	Antuna (penalty missed) , Lozano (penalty scored) , Pineda (penalty scored) , Pulido (penalty scored) , Romo (penalty scored) , Gallardo (penalty scored); (penalty scored) Venegas, (penalty missed) Duarte, (penalty scored) Alfaro, (penalty scored) Lassiter, (penalty scored) Calvo, (penalty missed) Cruz	Nations League SF	(National Football Federation of Guatemala) Bryan López	
6 June 2021	(United States) Empower Field at Mile High, Denver	United States	(3–2 (a.e.t.))	Reyna 27', McKennie 82', Pulisic 114' (pen.); Corona 2', Lainez 79'		Nations League F	(Panamanian Football Federation) John Pitti	
12 June 2021	(United States) Mercedes-Benz Stadium, Atlanta	Honduras	0–0	No Goals		Friendly	(United States Soccer Federation) Ted Unkel	
30 June 2021	(United States) Nissan Stadium, Nashville	Panama	3–0	Lainez 21', Montes 57', Martín 90+1'		Friendly	(Jamaica Football Federation) Kevin Morrison	
3 July 2021	(United States) Los Angeles Memorial Coliseum, Los Angeles	Nigeria	4–0	Herrera 2', 52', Funes Mori 4', Dos Santos 78'		Friendly	(Panamanian Football Federation) Oliver Vergara	
10 July 2021	(United States) AT&T Stadium, Arlington	Trinidad and Tobago	0–0	No Goals		2021 CONCACAF Gold Cup	(Costa Rican Football Federation) Ricardo Montero	
14 July 2021	(United States) Cotton Bowl, Dallas	Guatemala	0–3	Funes Mori 29', 55', Pineda 79'		2021 CONCACAF Gold Cup	(Jamaica Football Federation) Daneon Parchment	
18 July 2021	(United States) Cotton Bowl, Dallas	El Salvador	1–0	Rodríguez 26'		2021 CONCACAF Gold Cup	(National Autonomous Federation of Football of Honduras) Said Martínez	
24 July 2021	(United States) State Farm Stadium, Glendale	Honduras	3–0	Funes Mori 26', Dos Santos 31', Pineda 38'		2021 CONCACAF Gold Cup	(National Football Federation of Guatemala) Mario Escobar	
29 July 2021	(United States) NRG Stadium, Houston	Canada	2–1	Pineda 45+2' (pen.), Herrera 90+8', Buchanan 57'		2021 CONCACAF Gold Cup	(Jamaica Football Federation) Daneon Parchment	
1 August 2021	(United States) Allegiant Stadium, Paradise	United States	(1–0 (a.e.t.))	Robinson 118'		2021 CONCACAF Gold Cup final	(National Autonomous Federation of Football of Honduras) Said Martínez	
2 September 2021	Estadio Azteca, Mexico City	Jamaica	2–1	Vega 50', Martín 89'; Nicholson 65'		2022 FIFA World Cup qualifier	(National Autonomous Federation of Football of Honduras) Selvin Brown	Note: The match was played behind closed doors in response to the behavior of the fans from the 2020 CONCACAF Men's Olympic Qualifying Championship.
5 September 2021	(Costa Rica) Estadio Nacional, San José	Costa Rica	0–1	Pineda 45+1' (pen.)		2022 FIFA World Cup qualifier	(United States Soccer Federation) Ismail Elfath	
8 September 2021	Estadio Rommel Fernández, Panama City	Panama	1–1	Blackburn 28'; Corona 76'		2022 FIFA World Cup qualifier	(National Football Federation of Guatemala) Mario Escobar	
7 October 2021	Estadio Azteca, Mexico City	Canada	1–1	Sánchez 21'; Osorio 42'		2022 FIFA World Cup qualifier	(Salvadoran Football Federation) Ismael Cornejo	
10 October 2021	Estadio Azteca, Mexico City	Honduras	3–0	Córdova 18', Funes Mori 76', Lozano 86'		2022 FIFA World Cup qualifier	(United States Soccer Federation) Ismail Elfath	
13 October 2021	(El Salvador) Estadio Cuscatlán, San Salvador	El Salvador	0–2	Moreno 30'; Jiménez 90+3' (pen.)		2022 FIFA World Cup qualifier	(Canadian Soccer Association) Drew Fischer	
27 October 2021	(United States) Bank of America Stadium, Charlotte	Ecuador	2–3	Alvarado 6' O. Rodriguez 59'; Quiñónez 2' Corozo 15' Walter Chalá 75'		Friendly	(United States Soccer Federation) Ted Unkel	
12 November 2021	(United States) TQL Stadium, Cincinnati	United States	2–0	Pulisic 74'; McKennie 85'		2022 FIFA World Cup qualifier	(Salvadoran Football Federation) Iván Barton	
16 November 2021	(Canada) Commonwealth Stadium, Edmonton	Canada	2–1	Larin 45+2', 52'; Herrera 90'		2022 FIFA World Cup qualifier	(National Football Federation of Guatemala) Mario Escobar	
8 December 2021	(United States) Q2 Stadium, Austin	Chile	2–2	Giménez 9', Silva 64'; Morales 21', Parra 86'		Friendly	(National Autonomous Federation of Football of Honduras) Selvin Brown	
27 January 2022	(Jamaica) Independence Park, Kingston	Jamaica	1–2	Johnson 50'; Martín 81' Vega 83'		2022 FIFA World Cup qualifier	(Salvadoran Football Federation) Ismael Cornejo	
30 January 2022	Estadio Azteca, Mexico City	Costa Rica	0–0	No Goals		2022 FIFA World Cup qualifier	(National Autonomous Federation of Football of Honduras) Said Martínez	
2 February 2022	Estadio Azteca, Mexico City	Panama	1–0	Raúl Jiménez 80'		2022 FIFA World Cup qualifier	(Salvadoran Football Federation) Iván Barton	
24 March 2022	Estadio Azteca, Mexico City	United States	0–0	No Goals		2022 FIFA World Cup qualifier	(National Football Federation of Guatemala) Mario Escobar	
27 March 2022	(Honduras) Estadio Olímpico Metropolitano, San Pedro Sula	Honduras	0–1	Álvarez 70'		2022 FIFA World Cup qualifier	(United States Soccer Federation) Armando Villareal	
30 March 2022	Estadio Azteca, Mexico City	El Salvador	2–0	Uriel Antuna 17'; Raúl Jiménez 43'		2022 FIFA World Cup qualifier	(Jamaica Football Federation) Oshane Nation	
27 April 2022	(United States) Camping World Stadium, Orlando	Guatemala	0–0	No Goals		Friendly	(Grenada Football Association) Reon Radix	
28 May 2022	(United States) AT&T Stadium, Arlington	Nigeria	2–1	Santiago Giménez 12' William Troost-Ekong 56' (o.g.); Cyriel Dessers 54'		Friendly	(Puerto Rican Football Federation) José Torres	
2 June 2022	(United States) State Farm Stadium, Glendale	Uruguay	0–3	Vecino 35', Cavani 46', 54'		Friendly	(Costa Rican Football Federation) Juan Gabriel Calderón	
5 June 2022	Soldier Field Chicago, United States	Ecuador	0–0	No Goals		Friendly	(Panamanian Football Federation) Oliver Vergara	
11 June 2022	(Mexico) Estadio Corona, Torreón	Suriname	3–0	I. Reyes 4'; Martín 40' (pen.); É. Sánchez 90+4'		CNL 2022–23	(Salvadoran Football Federation) Iván Barton	
14 June 2022	(Jamaica) National Stadium, Kingston	Jamaica	1–1	Bailey 4'; Romo 45+3'		CNL 2022–23	(National Football Federation of Guatemala) Bryan López	
31 August 2022	(United States) Mercedes-Benz Stadium, Atlanta	Paraguay	0–1	D. González 50'		Friendly	(United States Soccer Federation) Nima Saghafi	
24 September 2022	(United States) Rose Bowl, Pasadena	Peru	1–0	Lozano 85'		Friendly	(National Football Federation of Guatemala) Bryan López	
27 September 2022	(United States) Levi's Stadium, Santa Clara	Colombia	2–3	Vega 6' (pen.) Arteaga 29'; Sinisterra 49', 52', Barrios 68'		Friendly	(United States Soccer Federation) Nima Saghafi	
9 November 2022	(Spain) Estadi Montilivi, Girona	Iraq	4–0	Vega 4', Funes Mori 48', Gallardo 67', Antuna 90+2' (pen.)		Friendly	(Royal Spanish Football Federation) Guillermo Cuadra Fernández	
16 November 2022	(Spain) Estadi Montilivi, Girona	Sweden	1–2	Rohdén 54' Svanberg 84'; Vega 60'		Friendly	(Royal Spanish Football Federation) César Soto Grado	
22 November 2022	(Qatar) Stadium 974, Doha	Poland	0–0	No Goals		2022 FIFA World Cup	(Football Australia) Chris Beath	
26 November 2022	(Qatar) Lusail Iconic Stadium, Lusail	Argentina	0–2	Messi 64' Fernández 87'		2022 FIFA World Cup	(Italian Football Federation) Daniele Orsato	
30 November 2022	(Qatar) Lusail Iconic Stadium, Lusail	Saudi Arabia	2–1	Martín 47', Chávez 52'; Al-Dawsari 90+5'		2022 FIFA World Cup	(The Football Association) Michael Oliver	
23 March 2023	(Suriname) Frank Essed Stadion, Paramaribo	Suriname	0–2	Vásquez 64'; Dankerlui 82' (o.g.)		CNL 2022–23	(National Autonomous Federation of Football of Honduras) Saíd Martínez	
26 March 2023	Estadio Azteca, Mexico City	Jamaica	2–2	Pineda 17', Lozano 45+2' (pen.); De Cordova-Reid 8', Álvarez 33' (o.g.)		CNL 2022–23	(United States Soccer Federation) Ismail Elfath	
19 April 2023	(United States) State Farm Stadium, Glendale	United States	1–1	Antuna 55'; Ferreira 81'		Continental Clásico	(National Football Federation of Guatemala) Bryan López	
7 June 2023	(Mexico) Estadio de Mazatlán, Mazatlán	Guatemala	2–0	Jiménez 14' (pen.) De la Rosa 80'		Friendly	(National Autonomous Federation of Football of Honduras) Nelson Salgado	
10 June 2023	(United States) Snapdragon Stadium, San Diego	Cameroon	2–2	Reyes 45+2' Álvarez 90+4'; Mbeumo 37' Toko Ekambi 61'		Friendly	(St. Kitts and Nevis Football Association) Kimbell Ward	
15 June 2023	(United States) Allegiant Stadium, Paradise	United States	3–0	Pulisic 37', 46', Pepi 78'		Nations League SF	(Salvadoran Football Federation) Iván Barton	
18 June 2023	(United States) Allegiant Stadium, Paradise	Panama	1–0	Gallardo 4'		Nations League 3rd	(Jamaica Football Federation) Daneon Parchment	
25 June 2023	(United States) NRG Stadium, Houston	Honduras	4–0	Romo 1', 23', Pineda 52', Chávez 64'		2023 CONCACAF Gold Cup	(National Football Federation of Guatemala) Mario Escobar	
29 June 2023	(United States) State Farm Stadium, Glendale	Haiti	3–1	Martín 46' Adé 56' (o.g.) Giménez 83'; Jean Jacques 78'		2023 CONCACAF Gold Cup	(National Football Federation of Guatemala) Walter López	
2 July 2023	(United States) Levi's Stadium, Santa Clara	Qatar	0–1	Shehata 27'		2023 CONCACAF Gold Cup	(Canadian Soccer Association) Drew Fischer	
8 July 2023	(United States) AT&T Stadium, Arlington	Costa Rica	2–0	Pineda 52' (pen.) É. Sánchez 87'		2023 CONCACAF Gold Cup	(National Autonomous Federation of Football of Honduras) Saíd Martínez	
12 July 2023	(United States) Allegiant Stadium, Paradise	Jamaica	3–0	Martín 2' Chávez 30' Alvarado		2023 CONCACAF Gold Cup	(National Football Federation of Guatemala) Mario Escobar	
16 July 2023	(United States) SoFi Stadium, Inglewood	Panama	1–0	Giménez 88'		2023 CONCACAF Gold Cup final	(National Autonomous Federation of Football of Honduras) Said Martínez	
9 September 2023	(United States) AT&T Stadium, Arlington	Australia	2–2	Souttar 16' Boyle 63' (pen.); Jiménez 69' (pen.) Huerta 83'		Friendly	(United States Soccer Federation) Rubio Vázquez	
12 September 2023	(United States) Mercedes-Benz Stadium, Atlanta	Uzbekistan	3–3	Jiménez 21', 81' Antuna 88'; Abdikholikov 18' Turgunboev 45+1' Shukurov 90+2'		Friendly	(United States Soccer Federation) Victor Rivas	
14 October 2023	(United States) Bank of America Stadium, Charlotte	Ghana	2–0	Lozano 57' Antuna 72'		Friendly	(United States Soccer Federation) Joseph Dickerson	
17 October 2023	(United States) Lincoln Financial Field, Philadelphia	Germany	2–2	Antuna 37' É. Sánchez 47'; Rüdiger 25' Füllkrug 51'		Friendly	(United States Soccer Federation) Rubiel Vazquez	
17 November 2023	(Honduras) Estadio Nacional Chelato Uclés, Tegucigalpa	Honduras	2–0	Lozano 30'; Róchez 72'		Nations League QF	(Costa Rican Football Federation) Juan Gabriel Calderón	
21 November 2023	Estadio Azteca, Mexico City	Honduras	2–0	Chávez 43'; Álvarez 90+11'		Nations League QF	(Salvadoran Football Federation) Iván Barton	
16 December 2023	(United States) Los Angeles Memorial Coliseum, Los Angeles	Colombia	2–3	Govea 40' Martínez 50'; Reyes 55' Martínez 69' Gómez 90+2'		Friendly	(United States Soccer Federation) Victor Rivas	
21 March 2024	(United States) AT&T Stadium, Arlington	Panama	3–0	Álvarez 40'; Quiñones 43'; Pineda 67'		Nations League SF	(National Football Federation of Guatemala) Walter López	
24 March 2024	(United States) AT&T Stadium, Arlington	United States	2–0	Adams 45'; Reyna 63'		Nations League F	(Canadian Soccer Association) Drew Fischer	
31 May 2024	(United States) Soldier Field, Chicago	Bolivia	1–0	Ef. Álvarez 47'		Friendly	(Japan Football Association) Yusuke Araki	
5 June 2024	(United States) Empower Field at Mile High, Denver	Uruguay	0–4	Núñez 7', 44', 49'; Pellistri 26'		Friendly	(Jamaica Football Federation) Oshane Nation	
8 June 2024	(United States) Kyle Field, College Station	Brazil	2–3	Quiñones 73' G. Martínez 90+2'; Pereira 5' Martinelli 54' Endrick 90+6'		Friendly	(United States Soccer Federation) Lukasz Szpala	
22 June 2024	(United States) NRG Stadium, Houston	Jamaica	1–0	Arteaga 69'		2024 Copa América	(United States Soccer Federation) Ismail Elfath	
26 June 2024	(United States) SoFi Stadium, Inglewood	Venezuela	0–1	Rondón 57' (pen.)		2024 Copa América	(Brazilian Football Confederation) Raphael Claus	
30 June 2024	(United States) State Farm Stadium, Glendale	Ecuador	0–0	No Goals		2024 Copa América	(National Football Federation of Guatemala) Mario Escobar	
7 September 2024	(United States) Rose Bowl, Pasadena	New Zealand	3–0	Pineda 5' Huerta 53' Romo 57'		Friendly	(United States Soccer Federation) Joseph Dickerson	
10 September 2024	(United States) AT&T Stadium, Arlington	Canada	0–0	No Goals		Friendly	(United States Soccer Federation) Victor Rivas	
15 October 2024	(Mexico) Estadio Akron, Zapopan	United States	2–0	Jiménez 22' Huerta 49'		Friendly	(Costa Rican Football Federation) Keylor Herrera	
15 November 2024	(Honduras) Estadio Francisco Morazán, San Pedro Sula	Honduras	2–0	Palma 64', 83'		Nations League QF	(National Football Federation of Guatemala) Walter López	
19 November 2024	(Mexico) Estadio Nemesio Díez, Toluca	Honduras	4–0	Jiménez 42' Martín 72', 90+7' (pen.) Sánchez 85'		Nations League QF	(Canadian Soccer Association) Drew Fischer	
20 March 2025	(United States) SoFi Stadium, Inglewood	Canada	0–2	Jiménez 1', 75'		Nations League SF	(National Autonomous Federation of Football of Honduras) Saíd Martínez	
23 March 2025	(United States) SoFi Stadium, Inglewood	Panama	2–1	Jiménez 8', 90+2' (pen.); Carrasquilla 45+2' (pen.)		Nations League F	(National Football Federation of Guatemala) Mario Escobar	
7 June 2025	(United States) Rice–Eccles Stadium, Salt Lake City	Switzerland	2–4	Giménez 51' Sepúlveda 75'; Embolo 20' Amdouni 64' Ndoye 71' Rieder 90'		Friendly	(United States Soccer Federation) Victor Rivas	
10 June 2025	(United States) Kenan Stadium, Chapel Hill	Turkey	1–0	Pineda 45'		Friendly	(Saint Vincent and the Grenadines Football Federation) Moeth Gaymes	
14 June 2025	(United States) SoFi Stadium, Inglewood	Dominican Republic	3–2	Álvarez 45+1' Jiménez 47' Montes 53'; Federico 51' Azcona 67'		2025 CONCACAF Gold Cup	(Jamaica Football Federation) Oshane Nation	
18 June 2025	(United States) AT&T Stadium, Arlington	Suriname	0–2	Montes 57', 63'		2025 CONCACAF Gold Cup	(National Autonomous Federation of Football of Honduras) Selvin Brown	
22 June 2025	(United States) Allegiant Stadium, Paradise	Costa Rica	0–0	No Goals		2025 CONCACAF Gold Cup	(National Football Federation of Guatemala) Mario Escobar	
28 June 2025	(United States) State Farm Stadium, Glendale	Saudi Arabia	2–0	Vega 49' Madu 81' (o.g.)		2025 CONCACAF Gold Cup	(United States Soccer Federation) Lukasz Szpala	
2 July 2025	(United States) Levi's Stadium, Santa Clara	Honduras	1–0	Jiménez 50'		2025 CONCACAF Gold Cup	(Costa Rican Football Federation) Juan Calderón	
6 July 2025	(United States) NRG Stadium, Houston	United States	1–2	Richards 4'; Jiménez 27' Ed. Álvarez 77'		2025 CONCACAF Gold Cup	(National Football Federation of Guatemala) Mario Escobar	
6 September 2025	(United States) Oakland Coliseum, Oakland	Japan	0–0	No Goals		Friendly	(United States Soccer Federation) Rubiel Vazquéz	
9 September 2025	(United States) Geodis Park, Nashville	South Korea	2–2	Jiménez 22' Giménez 90+4'; 65' Son 75' Oh		Friendly	(United States) Guido Gonzales Jr.	
11 October 2025	(United States) AT&T Stadium, Arlington	Colombia	0–4	Lucumí 16' Díaz 56' Lerma 64' Carbonero 87'		Friendly	(United States Soccer Federation) Ismail Elfath	
14 October 2025	(Mexico) Estadio Akron, Zapopan	Ecuador	1–1	Berterame 3'; 20' (pen.) Alcívar		Friendly	(United States Soccer Federation) Victor Rivas	
15 November 2025	(Mexico) Estadio Corona, Torreón	Uruguay	0–0	No Goals		Friendly	(Panamanian Football Federation) Fernando Morón	
18 November 2025	(United States) Alamodome, San Antonio	Paraguay	1–2	Jiménez 54'; 48' Sanabria 56' Bobadilla		Friendly	(United States Soccer Federation) Joseph Dickerson	
22 January 2026	Estadio Rommel Fernández, Panama City	Panama	0–1	90+3' Peralta		Friendly	(United States Soccer Federation) Guido Gonzales Jr.	
25 January 2026	(Bolivia) Estadio Ramón Tahuichi Aguilera, Santa Cruz de la Sierra	Bolivia	0–1	68' Berterame		Friendly	(Colombian Football Federation) Carlos Betancur	
25 February 2026	(Mexico) Estadio Corregidora, Querétaro	Iceland	4–0	Ledezma 22'; González 24'; Gallardo 59'; Gutiérrez 90+2'		Friendly	(Costa Rican Football Federation) Steven Madrigal	
28 March 2026	Estadio Azteca, Mexico City	Portugal	0–0	No Goals		Friendly	(National Football Federation of Guatemala) Walter López	
31 March 2026	(United States) Soldier Field, Chicago	Belgium	1–1	J. Sánchez 19'; Lukébakio 46'		Friendly	(United States Soccer Federation) Rosendo Mendoza	
22 May 2026	(Mexico) Estadio Cuauhtémoc, Puebla	Ghana	2–0	B. Gutiérrez 2', Martínez 54'		Friendly	(National Autonomous Federation of Football of Honduras) Selvin Brown	
30 May 2026	(United States) Rose Bowl, Pasadena	Australia	1–0	J. Vásquez 27'		Friendly	(United States Soccer Federation) Ismail Elfath	
4 June 2026	(Mexico) Estadio Nemesio Díez, Toluca	Serbia	5–1	J. Vásquez 34'; S. Bukinac 45+3' (o.g.); R. Jiménez 57'; A. Avdić 72' (o.g.); L. Chávez 90'; 19' P. Stanić		Friendly	(Costa Rican Football Federation) Keylor Herrera	
11 June 2026	Estadio Azteca, Mexico City	South Africa	2–0	Quiñones 9'; Jiménez 67'		2026 FIFA World Cup	(Brazilian Football Confederation) Wilton Sampaio	
18 June 2026	(Mexico) Estadio Akron, Zapopan	South Korea	1–0	Romo 50'		2026 FIFA World Cup	(Uruguayan Football Association) Gustavo Tejera	
24 June 2026	Estadio Azteca, Mexico City	Czech Republic	0–3	55' Chávez; 61' Quiñones; 90+4' Fidalgo		2026 FIFA World Cup	(Argentine Football Association) Yael Falcón	
30 June 2026	Estadio Azteca, Mexico City	Ecuador	2–0	Quiñones 22'; Jiménez 31'		2026 FIFA World Cup	(Football Association of Slovenia) Slavko Vinčić	
5 July 2026	Estadio Azteca, Mexico City	England	2–3	Bellingham 36'; Bellingham 38'; 42'Quiñones 42'; Kane 60' (pen.); Jiménez 69'		2026 FIFA World Cup	(Football Australia) Alireza Faghani	
26 September 2026	(United States) M&T Bank Stadium, Baltimore	Colombia	1–1	Mora 62'; Suárez 9'		Friendly	(United States Soccer Federation) Guido Gonzales Jr.	
29 September 2026	(United States) Sports Illustrated Stadium, Harrison	Peru	1–1	Guzmán 49'; Veléz 26'		Friendly	(United States Soccer Federation) John Freemon	
3 October 2026	(United States) State Farm Stadium, Glendale	United States	3–0	Hall 38'; Sullivan 62'; Tillman 84'		Friendly	(National Autonomous Federation of Football of Honduras) Selvin Brown	
6 October 2026	(United States) Los Angeles Memorial Coliseum, Los Angeles	Chile	0–2	Gutiérrez 54'; Pizarro 65'		Friendly	(Canadian Soccer Association) Filip Dujic	
14 November 2026	(Jamaica) Independence Park, Kingston	Jamaica	3–2			2026–27 Nations League QF 1st Leg		
17 November 2026	(Mexico) Estadio BBVA, Guadalupe	Jamaica	1–1 3 (a)–3			2026–27 Nations League QF 2nd Leg		

== Unofficial matches ==
Date	Location	Opponents	Score	Ref
9 June 1928	Rotterdam, Netherlands	(Netherlands) Feyenoord	4–3	
24 June 1928	Zurich, Switzerland	(Switzerland) SC Young Fellows Juventus	1–0	
1 July 1928	(Germany) Mainzer Stadion, Mainz	(Germany) Mainz / SV Wehen Wiesbaden	4–1	
3 July 1928	(Germany) Mannheimstadion, Mannheim	(Germany) SV Waldhof Mannheim / Arminia Ludwigshafen	1–1	
3 August 1930	Santiago, Chile	(Chile) Colo-Colo / Unión Española	3–3	
12 December 1930	Mexico City	ISCO	7–0	
30 May 1934	Bern, Switzerland	(Switzerland) Kreuzlingen	1–1	
31 May 1934	Bern, Switzerland	(Switzerland) BSC Young Boys	2–1	
9 June 1934	Rotterdam, Netherlands	(Netherlands) Sparta Rotterdam	1–0	
15 August 1937	Mexico City	(Spain) FC Barcelona	5–2	
28 November 1937	Mexico City	Basque Country	1–4	
5 December 1937	Mexico City	Basque Country	1–2	
12 December 1937	Mexico City	Basque Country	0–4	
9 January 1938	Mexico City	Basque Country	3–1	
21 August 1938	Parque Necaxa, Mexico City	(Mexico) Necaxa / Asturias	7–2	
16 October 1938	Parque Asturias, Mexico City	Basque Country	8–4	
23 October 1938	Parque Necaxa, Mexico City	Basque Country	2–6	
30 October 1938	, Parque Asturias, Mexico City	Basque Country	1–3	
17 August 1947	Estadio Ciudad de los Deportes, Mexico City	(Hungary) Ferencvárosi TC	4–3	
28 August 1949	Estadio Ciudad de los Deportes, Mexico City	(Mexico) Atlante	2–1	
27 November 1949	(Spain) Estadio Chamartín, Madrid	(Spain) Real Madrid	7–1	
19 February 1950	Estadio Ciudad de los Deportes, Mexico City	(Argentina) River Plate	2–0	
11 June 1950	Estadio Ciudad de los Deportes, Mexico City	(Italy) Genoa CFC	3–1	
7 February 1952	Estadio Ciudad de los Deportes, Mexico City	(Argentina) Banfield	2–0	
24 February 1952	(Mexico) La Martinica, León	(Mexico) Necaxa	6–0	
20 December 1953	Estadio Ciudad de los Deportes, Mexico City	(Brazil) Grêmio	3–3	
30 May 1954	Estadio Ciudad de los Deportes, Mexico City	(Mexico) Puebla	3–0	
26 June 1954	(Germany) Neckarstadion, Stuttgart	(Germany) VFB Stuttgart	5–1	
9 February 1956	Estadio Ciudad de los Deportes, Mexico City	FK Austria Wien	4–0	
21 February 1957	Estadio Olímpico Universitario, Mexico City	(Argentina) Lanús	6–1	
3 March 1957	(Mexico) Estadio San Isidro, Torreón	(Mexico) Laguna	8–2	
31 March 1957	(Mexico) Deportivo Toluca, Toluca	(Mexico) Toluca	2–0	
23 June 1957	Estadio Olímpico Universitario, Mexico City	(Germany) Hannover 96	3–0	
4 May 1958	Estadio Olímpico Universitario, Mexico City	(Brazil) CR Vasco da Gama	1–1	
22 February 1959	Estadio Olímpico Universitario, Mexico City	(Sweden) Helsingborgs	2–1	
16 August 1961	(Mexico) Estadio Jalisco, Guadalajara	(Mexican Football Federation) Atlas	4–2	
22 October 1961	Estadio Olímpico Universitario, Mexico City	(Costa Rica) Herediano	1–0	
21 March 1962	Estadio Olímpico Universitario, Mexico City	(Mexican Football Federation) Necaxa	3–3	
15 April 1962	(Mexico) Estadio Tecnológico, Monterrey	(Mexican Football Federation) Monterrey	4–1	
18 April 1962	(Mexico) Estadio Jalisco, Guadalajara	(Mexican Football Federation) Oro	0–2	
3 May 1962	Estadio Olimpico Universitario, Mexico City	(Germany) Karlsruher SC	4–0	
17 May 1962	Estadio Olimpico Universitario, Mexico City	(Brazil) América	1–1	
17 March 1963	(Mexico) Estadio Jalisco, Guadalajara	(Mexico) Atlas	2–0	
19 February 1965	Estadio Olímpico Universitario, Mexico City	(Brazil) Botafogo	2–2	
23 February 1965	Estadio Olímpico Universitario, Mexico City	(Argentina) San Lorenzo	4–0	
23 May 1965	(Mexico) Estadio Jalisco, Guadalajara	(Mexican Football Federation) Guadalajara	4–4	
3 April 1966	(Mexico) Estadio Jalisco, Guadalajara	(Mexican Football Federation) Guadalajara	3–0	
10 April 1966	(Mexico) Estadio Revolución, Irapuato	(Mexican Football Federation) Irapuato	5–0	
3 May 1966	Estadio Olímpico Universitario, Mexico City	(French Football Federation) AS Monaco FC	1–0	
1 June 1966	(Chile) Estadio Nacional Julio Martínez Pradanos, Santiago	(Italian Football Federation) AC Milan	1–1	
5 June 1966	(Chile) Estadio Nacional Julio Martínez Prádanos, Santiago	(Royal Spanish Football Federation) Sevilla FC	3–1	
12 June 1966	Estadio Azteca, Mexico City	(The Football Association) Tottenham Hotspur	0–1	
17 May 1967	(Mexico) Estadio León, León	(Brazilian Football Confederation) Cruzeiro	0–1	
21 May 1967	Estadio Azteca, Mexico City	(Portuguese Football Federation) S.L. Benfica	4–0	
15 June 1967	Estadio Azteca, Mexico City	(Mexican Football Federation) América	1–0	
20 June 1967	Estadio Azteca, Mexico City	(Mexican Football Federation) Toluca	2–0	
23 March 1969	(Mexico) Estadio Irapuato, Irapuato	(Mexican Football Federation) Irapuato	4–1	
19 August 1969	(Mexico) Estadio Jalisco, Guadalajara	(Mexican Football Federation) Guadalajara	2–0	
23 September 1969	Estadio Azteca, Mexico City	Universidad de Chile	1–0	
7 October 1969	Estadio Azteca, Mexico City	(Mexico) Necaxa	4–0	
9 December 1969	Estadio Azteca, Mexico City	(Sweden) Åtvidabergs FF	2–1	
16 December 1969	(Mexico) Estadio Cuauhtémoc, Puebla	(Sweden) Åtvidabergs FF	0–0	
29 January 1970	Estadio Azteca, Mexico City	(Socialist Federal Republic of Yugoslavia) FK Partizan	1–1	
7 May 1970	Estadio Olímpico Universitario, Mexico City	(Germany) Borussia Dortmund	1–0	
10 May 1970	(Mexico) Estadio Toluca 70, Toluca	(Germany) Borussia Dortmund	2–1	
13 May 1970	Estadio Olímpico Universitario, Mexico City	(Scottish Football Association) Dundee United F.C.	6–0	
14 September 1971	(France) Stade de la Meinau, Strasbourg	(French Football Federation) RC Strasbourg Alsace	1–0	
30 July 1972	(Mexico) Estadio León, León	(Brazil) Atlético Mineiro	2–4	
28 August 1973	(Mexico) Estadio Universitario, San Nicolás	(Mexican Football Federation) Monterrey	3–2	
25 September 1973	Estadio Azteca, Mexico City	(Argentina) Chacarita Juniors	2–2	
25 October 1975	(Italy) Stadio Olimpico, Rome	(Italy) SS Lazio	1–0	
6 January 1976	Estadio Azteca, Mexico City	(Argentina) Independiente	2–0	
11 May 1976	Estadio Azteca, Mexico City	(Scottish Football Association) Motherwell	2–1	
25 May 1976	Estadio Azteca, Mexico City	(Spain) Athletic Bilbao	3–0	
1 September 1976	(Spain) Estadio Vicente Calderón, Madrid	(Spain) Atlético Madrid	1–0	
1 March 1977	(Mexico) Estadio Universitario, San Nicolás	(Brazil) Cruzeiro	0–0	
20 July 1977	(United States) Oakland Coliseum, Oakland	(Germany) FC Bayern Munich	4–2	
10 January 1978	(Mexico) Estadio León, León	(Bulgaria) Levski Spartak	3–0	
17 January 1978	(Mexico) Estadio León, León	(Switzerland) Grasshopper	8–0	
28 March 1978	(United States) San Diego Stadium, San Diego	(United States) San Diego Sockers	2–0	
1 May 1978	(Germany) Neckarstadion, Stuttgart	(Germany) VfB Stuttgart	0–0	
5 May 1978	(Germany) Kassel Aue, Kassel	(Germany) Eintracht Frankfurt	0–0	
8 May 1978	(Germany) Ruhrstadion, Bochum	(Germany) VfL Bochum	3–2	
23 May 1978	(Brazil) Estádio Centenário, Caxias do Sul	(Brazil) Caxias do Sul	1–1	
19 February 1980	(Mexico) Estadio Cuauhtémoc, Puebla	(Paraguay) Club Olimpia	1–2	
11 March 1980	(United States) Hoy Stadium, Phoenix	(United States) Phoenix Fire	3–0	
25 March 1980	(Mexico) Estadio Municipal de Texcoco, Texcoco	(United States) San Diego Sockers	6–1	
6 May 1980	(United States) Los Angeles Memorial Coliseum, Los Angeles	(England) Southampton F.C.	1–0	
12 October 1980	Estadio Azteca, Mexico City	(Paraguay) Cerro Porteño	1–0	
17 March 1981	(Mexico) Estadio Jalisco, Guadalajara	(Mexican Football Federation) C.D. Guadalajara	2–1	
21 April 1981	(Mexico) Estadio Tamaulipas, Tampico	(Germany) VfL Bochum	1–0	
12 May 1981	(Mexico) Estadio Olímpico Benito Juárez, Ciudad Juárez	(Spain) Atlético Madrid	0–0	
26 May 1981	Estadio Azteca, Mexico City	(Brazil) São Paulo FC	3–0	
9 June 1981	(Mexico) Estadio Moctezuma, Torreón	(Netherlands) PSV Eindhoven	1–0	
27 September 1981	(Mexico) Estadio Irapuato, Irapuato	(Uruguay) Cerro	1–1	
4 October 1981	Estadio Nacional Mateo Flores, Guatemala City	(Guatemala) Comunicaciones FC	3–1	
6 October 1981	(Costa Rica) Estadio Ricardo Saprissa Aymá, San Juan de Tibás	(Costa Rica) Deportivo Saprissa	1–0	
15 October 1981	(Uruguay) Estadio Centenario, Montevideo	(Uruguay) Nacional	5–1	
25 January 1983	(Mexico) Estadio Universtiario, Sán Nicolas	(Hungary) Vasas SC	1–0	
15 November 1983	(United States) Los Angeles Memorial Coliseum, Los Angeles	(Spain) Cádiz CF	2–0	
2 August 1984	Estadio Azteca, Mexico City	(Hungary) Győri ETO FC	4–3	
6 November 1984	(Brazil) Pacaembu, São Paulo	(Brazil) Palmeiras	2–0	
5 March 1985	(United States) Los Angeles Memorial Coliseum, Los Angeles	(Italy) ACF Fiorentina	1–0	
31 August 1985	(United States) Spartan Stadium, San Jose	(Brazil) SC Corinthians Paulista	1–1	
29 September 1985	(Mexico) Irapuato	(Mexican Football Federation) Cruz Azul	2–1	
23 March 1986	(United States) Spartan Stadium, San Jose	(Brazil) Santos FC	0–0	
30 March 1986	(Mexico) Estadio Corregidora, Querétaro	(Argentina) Argentinos Juniors	5–1	
23 April 1986	(Mexico) Corona, Torreón	Universidad de Chile	1–0	
4 May 1986	(United States) Los Angeles Memorial Coliseum, Los Angeles	(Germany) Hamburger SV	2–0	
4 February 1987	(Mexico) Estadio Corregidora, Querétaro	(Portuguese Football Federation) Sporting CP	2–1	
3 March 1987	(Mexico) Estadio Universitario, San Nicolás	(Mexican Football Federation) Tigres	2–0	
18 July 1987	(Mexico) Estadio Universitario, San Nicolás	(Uruguay) Peñarol	2–2	
22 July 1987	(Mexico) Estadio Tres de Mazro, Zapopan	(Uruguay) Peñarol	0–0	
26 July 1987	(Mexico) Estadio Tres de Marzo, Zapopan	(Argentina) Racing Club	2–0	
23 August 1987	(United States) Memorial Coliseum, Los Angeles	(Brazil) CR Flamengo	3–2	
18 November 1987	(United States) Spartan Stadium, San Jose	(Argentina) Newell's Old Boys	2–1	
13 August 1989	(United States) Memorial Coliseum, Los Angeles	(Italy) Juventus	3–2	
22 May 1990	(United States) Memorial Coliseum, Los Angeles	(Germany) 1. FC Köln	1–1	
24 May 1990	(United States) Memorial Coliseum, Los Angeles	(Spain) Real Madrid	3–1	Team details: Real Madrid / Mexico; GK / 1 / Francisco Buyo; RB / 3 / Lopez Martin / / (substituted off) 45'; CB / 2 / Juan Jose Maqueda; LB / 13 / Solana; RM / 7 / Aragon / / (substituted off) 74'; CM / 5 / Miguel Tendillo; CM / 8 / Bernd Schuster; CM / 6 / Parra; LM / 11 / Rafael Gordillo; FW / 10 / Paco Llorente / / (substituted off) 45'; FW / 9 / Hugo Sanchez / 26'; Substitutes: MF / 18 / Anton / / (substituted on) 45'; MF / 21 / Ismael Urzaiz / / (substituted on) 74'; MF / 17 / Aldana / / (substituted on) 45'; Manager: (Wales) John Benjamin Toshack: GK / 1 / Adrian Chavez; RB / 2 / Juan Hernandez; CB / 3 / Octavio Becerril; CB / 4 / Roberto Ruiz Esparza; LB / 5 / Jose Enrique Vaca; RM / 8 / Victor Medina; CM / 6 / Carlos Muñoz / (c); CM / 11 / Gonzalo Farfan / 15' / (substituted off) 57'; LM / 7 / Missael Espinoza; RF / 9 / Ricardo Pelaez / 30'; LF / 17 / Luis Roberto Alves / 34' / (substituted off) 80'; Substitutes: RF / 19 / Luis Flores / / (substituted on) 57'; CM / 16 / Guillermo Vazquez / / (substituted on) 80'; Manager: Ignacio Trelles
22 August 1992	(Italy) Stadio Friuli, Udine	(Italian Football Federation) Udinese	3–2	
30 August 1992	(Spain) Estadio Antonio Domínguez Alfonso, Tenerife	(Royal Spanish Football Federation) CD Tenerife	(2–2) 2–0 (p)	
19 October 1992	(Austria) Goldeck-Stadion, Spittal an der Drau	(Austria) SV Spittal/Drau	2–1	
3 February 1993	(Mexico) Estadio Tecnológico, Monterrey	(Colombian Football Federation) Millonarios	2–1	
4 March 1993	(Mexico) Estadio Cancún 86, Cancún	(Mexican Football Federation) Pioneros / Caribeños	1–0	
11 March 1993	Estadio Azteca, Mexico City	(Mexican Football Federation) Querétaro	2–2	
16 March 1993	(Chile) Estadio Monumental David Arellano, Macul	(Football Federation of Chile) Colo-Colo	1–0	
23 March 1993	Estadio Azteca, Mexico City	(Football Federation of Chile) Colo-Colo	4–0	
26 March 1993	(Mexico) Estadio Olímpico, Villahermosa	(Uruguayan Football Association) Peñarol	(1–1) 6–5 (p)	
2 July 1993	Estadio Azulgrana, Mexico City	(Polish Football Association) ŁKS Łódź	2–1	
1 August 1993	Estadio Azteca, Mexico City	(Royal Spanish Football Federation) Atlético Madrid	2–3	
29 May 1994	Estadio Azteca, Mexico City	(Royal Dutch Football Association) AFC Ajax	2–1	
31 March 1998	(Argentina) Estadio Camilo Cichero, Buenos Aires	(Argentine Football Association) Boca Juniors	1–3	
7 April 1998	(Chile) Estadio San Carlos de Apoquindo, Santiago	(Chile) U. Católica	5–1	
7 May 1998	(Italy) Stadio Renato Dall'Ara, Bologna	(Italian Football Federation) Bologna	0–1	
13 May 1998	(Italy) Stadio Pier Luigi Penzo, Venice	(Italian Football Federation) Venezia FC	1–0	
16 May 1998	(Italy) Stadio Enzo Mazotti, Montecatini Terme	(Romanian Football Federation) Steaua Bucharest	0–0	
27 May 1998	(Germany) Verein für Leibesübungen, Braunschweig	(German Football Association) VfL Wolfsburg	4–1	
20 May 2002	(United States) Memorial Coliseum, Los Angeles	(Italian Football Federation) AC Milan	2–1	
25 May 2002	(Japan) Technoport Fukui Stadium, Mikuni	(Japan Football Association) Tokyo Verdy	2–0	
3 June 2006	(Germany) Jahnstadion, Göttingen	(Germany) 1. SC Göttingen 05	3–0	
3 July 2013	(Mexico) Estadio Corregidora, Querétaro	(Mexican Football Federation) Querétaro	2–3	
12 October 2024	(Mexico) Estadio Cuauhtémoc, Puebla	(Royal Spanish Football Federation) Valencia CF	2–2	
16 January 2025	(Brazil) Estádio Beira-Rio, Porto Alegre	(Brazilian Football Confederation) Internacional	0–2	
21 January 2025	(Argentina) Estadio Monumental, Buenos Aires	(Argentine Football Association) River Plate	2–0	

== See also ==
- Mexico at the CONCACAF Gold Cup
- Mexico at the CONCACAF Nations League
- Mexico at the Copa América
- Mexico at the FIFA World Cup
