= 1993 CONCACAF Gold Cup squads =

These are the squad lists of the teams participating in the 1993 CONCACAF Gold Cup.

== Group A ==
=== Honduras ===
Head Coach: (Uruguay) Julio González Montemurro

No.	Pos.	Player	Date of birth (age)	Club
1	GK	Juan Pablo Centeno	5 February 1956 (aged 37)	(National Autonomous Federation of Football of Honduras) Petrotela
2	DF	Gustavo Cálix	4 August 1972 (aged 20)	(National Autonomous Federation of Football of Honduras) Petrotela
3	DF	Arnold Cruz	22 December 1970 (aged 22)	(National Autonomous Federation of Football of Honduras) Olimpia
4	DF	Juan Francisco Castro	31 August 1965 (aged 27)	(National Autonomous Federation of Football of Honduras) Real España
5	MF	Erick Fú Lanza	17 June 1964 (aged 29)	(National Autonomous Federation of Football of Honduras) Olimpia
6	DF	Mateo Ávila	16 December 1970 (aged 22)	(National Autonomous Federation of Football of Honduras) Motagua
7	FW	Eugenio Dolmo Flores	31 July 1965 (aged 27)	(National Autonomous Federation of Football of Honduras) Petrotela
8	MF	Juan Carlos Espinoza	24 August 1958 (aged 34)	(National Autonomous Federation of Football of Honduras) Olimpia
9	FW	Carlos Pavón	9 October 1973 (aged 19)	(National Autonomous Federation of Football of Honduras) Real España
10	MF	Luís Calix	30 August 1965 (aged 27)	(National Autonomous Federation of Football of Honduras) Petrotela
11	FW	Nicolás Suazo	9 January 1965 (aged 28)	(National Autonomous Federation of Football of Honduras) Marathón
12	DF	Tomás Róchez	1 October 1964 (aged 28)	(National Autonomous Federation of Football of Honduras) Petrotela
13	GK	Wilmer Cruz	18 December 1965 (aged 27)	(National Autonomous Federation of Football of Honduras) Real España
14	DF	José García	18 April 1966 (aged 27)	(National Autonomous Federation of Football of Honduras) Olimpia
15	MF	Víctor Orlando Garay		(National Autonomous Federation of Football of Honduras) Petrotela
16	MF	Alex Piñeda Chacón	19 December 1969 (aged 23)	(National Autonomous Federation of Football of Honduras) Olimpia
17	DF	José Villatoro Ulloa	2 April 1968 (aged 25)	(National Autonomous Federation of Football of Honduras) Marathón
18	MF	Geovany Gayle Alarcon	5 December 1974 (aged 18)	(National Autonomous Federation of Football of Honduras) Petrotela
19	FW	Eduardo Bennett	17 September 1968 (aged 24)	(National Autonomous Federation of Football of Honduras) Olimpia
20	DF	Pastor Martínez	9 August 1964 (aged 28)	(National Autonomous Federation of Football of Honduras) Petrotela

=== Jamaica ===
Head coach: (Jamaica) Carl Brown

No.	Pos.	Player	Date of birth (age)	Club
1	GK	Warren Barrett	9 July 1970 (aged 23)	(Jamaica Football Federation) Violet Kickers
2	DF	Barrington Gaynor	27 September 1965 (aged 27)	(Jamaica Football Federation) Bull Bay FC
3	DF	Dean Sewell	13 April 1972 (aged 21)	(Jamaica Football Federation) Constant Spring
4	DF	Linval Dixon	14 September 1971 (aged 21)	(Jamaica Football Federation) Clarendon College
7	DF	Anthony Corbett	8 June 1962 (aged 31)	(Jamaica Football Federation) Hazard United
8	FW	Byron Earle		(Jamaica Football Federation) Seba United
9	FW	Paul Davis	13 July 1962 (aged 30)	(Jamaica Football Federation) Seba United
10	MF	Donald Hewitt	2 November 1966 (aged 26)	(Jamaica Football Federation) Violet Kickers
11	MF	Winston Anglin	27 August 1962 (aged 30)	(Jamaica Football Federation) Waterhouse
12	FW	Roderick Reid	10 January 1970 (aged 23)	(Jamaica Football Federation) Arnett Gardens
15	DF	Desmond Smith	30 October 1966 (aged 26)	(Jamaica Football Federation) Galaxy F.C.
16	FW	Walter Boyd	1 January 1972 (aged 21)	(United States Soccer Federation) Colorado Foxes
17	DF	Infidel Hamilton	7 February 1969 (aged 24)	(Jamaica Football Federation) Harbour View
18	MF	Hector Wright	8 May 1969 (aged 24)	(Jamaica Football Federation) Seba United
20	DF	Anthony Dennis	25 July 1967 (aged 25)	(Jamaica Football Federation) Reno
21	DF	Durrant Brown	8 July 1964 (aged 29)	(Jamaica Football Federation) Wadadah
22	GK	Clave Smith	27 October 1968 (aged 24)	(Jamaica Football Federation) Boys Town
23	FW	Devon Jarrett		(Jamaica Football Federation) Olympic Gardens

=== Panama ===
Head Coach: (Colombia) Saúl Suárez

No.	Pos.	Player	Date of birth (age)	Club
1	GK	Ricardo James	7 May 1966 (aged 27)	(National Autonomous Federation of Football of Honduras) Platense
2	MF	Eric Medina Bernal	3 June 1968 (aged 25)	(Panamanian Football Federation) Argentina Colón
3	DF	José Alfredo Poyatos	27 November 1964 (aged 28)	(Salvadoran Football Federation) Cojutepeque
4	MF	Jesús Julio	2 December 1962 (aged 30)	(Panamanian Football Federation) Plaza Amador
5	DF	Franklin Delgado	18 February 1966 (aged 27)	(Salvadoran Football Federation) Tiburones
6	DF	Jorge Méndez	5 March 1959 (aged 34)	(Panamanian Football Federation) Plaza Amador
8	FW	Armando Dely Valdés	5 January 1964 (aged 29)	(Uruguayan Football Association) Liverpool
9	FW	Víctor René Mendieta	16 June 1961 (aged 32)	(Mexican Football Federation) Leones Negros UdeG
11	MF	Pércival Piggott	23 November 1966 (aged 26)	(Panamanian Football Federation) Tauro
15	DF	Rogelio Clarke	9 February 1964 (aged 29)	(Panamanian Football Federation) Argentina Colón
16	MF	Neftalí Díaz	15 December 1971 (aged 21)	(Panamanian Football Federation) Euro Kickers
17	DF	Agustín Castillo	8 July 1971 (aged 22)	(Panamanian Football Federation) San Francisco
18	MF	Rubén Atencio	20 September 1969 (aged 23)	(Panamanian Football Federation) Chorrillo
20	MF	Erik Bernal		(Panamanian Football Federation) San Joaquín
21	MF	Frank Lozada	6 October 1965 (aged 27)	(Costa Rican Football Federation) Pérez Zeledón
12	GK	Donaldo Gonzalez	27 November 1967 (aged 25)	(Panamanian Football Federation) Projusa
23	MF	Luis Angel Rodriguez	15 February 1972 (aged 21)	(Panamanian Football Federation) Ejecutivo Junior
14	MF	Rubén Guevara	27 January 1964 (aged 29)	(Panamanian Football Federation) Tauro
7	MF	Wilfredo Mojica	4 July 1971 (aged 22)	(Panamanian Football Federation) Projusa
13	FW	Oberto Lynch	20 July 1960 (aged 32)	(Panamanian Football Federation) San Francisco

=== United States ===
Head Coach: (Serbia) Bora Milutinovic

No.	Pos.	Player	Date of birth (age)	Club
1	GK	Tony Meola	21 February 1969 (aged 24)	(United States Soccer Federation) U.S. Soccer
2	DF	Mike Lapper	28 August 1970 (aged 22)	(United States Soccer Federation) U.S. Soccer
3	DF	John Doyle	16 March 1966 (aged 27)	(United States Soccer Federation) U.S. Soccer
4	DF	Cle Kooiman	3 July 1963 (aged 30)	(Mexican Football Federation) Cruz Azul
5	MF	Thomas Dooley	12 May 1961 (aged 32)	(German Football Association) 1. FC Kaiserslautern
6	MF	John Harkes	8 March 1967 (aged 26)	(The Football Association) Sheffield Wednesday
7	MF	Mark Chung	18 June 1970 (aged 23)	(United States Soccer Federation) U.S. Soccer
8	DF	Dominic Kinnear	26 July 1967 (aged 25)	(United States Soccer Federation) U.S. Soccer
9	MF	Tab Ramos	21 September 1966 (aged 26)	(Royal Spanish Football Federation) Real Betis
10	DF	Peter Vermes	21 November 1966 (aged 26)	(United States Soccer Federation) U.S. Soccer
11	FW	Eric Wynalda	9 June 1969 (aged 24)	(German Football Association) 1. FC Saarbrücken
13	MF	Cobi Jones	16 June 1970 (aged 23)	(United States Soccer Federation) U.S. Soccer
14	FW	Joe-Max Moore	23 February 1971 (aged 22)	(United States Soccer Federation) U.S. Soccer
15	DF	Desmond Armstrong	2 November 1964 (aged 28)	(United States Soccer Federation) U.S. Soccer
17	FW	Roy Wegerle	19 March 1964 (aged 29)	(The Football Association) Coventry City
18	GK	Brad Friedel	18 May 1971 (aged 22)	(United States Soccer Federation) U.S. Soccer
19	MF	Chris Henderson	11 December 1970 (aged 22)	(United States Soccer Federation) U.S. Soccer
20	DF	Janusz Michallik	22 April 1966 (aged 27)	(United States Soccer Federation) U.S. Soccer
21	MF	Fernando Clavijo	23 January 1956 (aged 37)	(United States Soccer Federation) U.S. Soccer
22	DF	Alexi Lalas	1 June 1970 (aged 23)	(United States Soccer Federation) U.S. Soccer

== Group B ==
=== Canada ===
Head Coach: (Canada) Bob Lenarduzzi

No.	Pos.	Player	Date of birth (age)	Club
1	GK	Craig Forrest	20 September 1967 (aged 25)	(The Football Association) Ipswich Town
2	DF	Frank Yallop	4 April 1964 (aged 29)	(The Football Association) Ipswich Town
3	DF	Enzo Concina	21 June 1962 (aged 31)	(Italian Football Federation) Nola
4	MF	Nick Dasovic	5 December 1968 (aged 24)	(Canadian Soccer Association) Montreal Impact
5	DF	Randy Samuel	23 December 1963 (aged 29)	(Royal Dutch Football Association) Fortuna Sittard
6	DF	Colin Miller	4 October 1964 (aged 28)	(Scottish Football Association) Hamilton Academical
7	MF	John Limniatis	24 June 1967 (aged 26)	(Canadian Soccer Association) Montreal Impact
8	MF	Lyndon Hooper	30 May 1966 (aged 27)	(Canadian Soccer Association) Toronto Blizzard
9	FW	Alex Bunbury	18 June 1967 (aged 26)	(The Football Association) West Ham United
10	MF	Geoff Aunger	4 February 1968 (aged 25)	(Canadian Soccer Association) Vancouver 86ers
11	FW	Roderick Scott	27 December 1965 (aged 27)	(United States Soccer Federation) Dallas Sidekicks
12	FW	Paul Peschisolido	25 May 1971 (aged 22)	(The Football Association) Birmingham City
13	FW	Niall Thompson	16 April 1974 (aged 19)	(The Football Association) Crystal Palace
14	FW	Domenic Mobilio	14 January 1969 (aged 24)	(Canadian Soccer Association) Vancouver 86ers
15	FW	Eddy Berdusco	8 September 1969 (aged 23)	(Canadian Soccer Association) Toronto Blizzard
16	DF	Mark Watson	8 September 1970 (aged 22)	(Canadian Soccer Association) Vancouver 86ers
17	DF	Paul Fenwick	25 August 1969 (aged 23)	(The Football Association) Birmingham City
18	GK	Pat Onstad	13 January 1968 (aged 25)	(Canadian Soccer Association) Toronto Blizzard

=== Costa Rica ===
Head Coach: (Costa Rica) Álvaro Grant MacDonald

No.	Pos.	Player	Date of birth (age)	Club
1	GK	Erick Lonnis	9 September 1965 (aged 27)	(Costa Rican Football Federation) Carmelita
2	DF	Reynaldo Parks	4 December 1974 (aged 18)	(Costa Rican Football Federation) Limonense
3	DF	Luis Marín	10 August 1974 (aged 18)	(Costa Rican Football Federation) Carmelita
4	DF	Erick Mata	29 November 1967 (aged 25)	(Costa Rican Football Federation) Turrialba
5	DF	Adolfo Rojas	22 August 1968 (aged 24)	(Costa Rican Football Federation) Puntarenas
6	DF	Javier Delgado	28 July 1968 (aged 24)	(Costa Rican Football Federation) Alajuelense
7	FW	Michael Myers	1 April 1968 (aged 25)	(Costa Rican Football Federation) Turrialba
8	MF	Giancarlo Morera	16 September 1968 (aged 24)	(Costa Rican Football Federation) Saprissa
9	FW	Roy Myers	13 April 1969 (aged 24)	(Costa Rican Football Federation) Saprissa
10	FW	Juan Cayasso	24 June 1961 (aged 32)	(Costa Rican Football Federation) Carmelita
11	MF	Carlos Luis Castro		(Costa Rican Football Federation) Carmelita
12	MF	Johnny Murillo	11 November 1972 (aged 20)	(Costa Rican Football Federation) Puntarenas
13	MF	José Alberto Solano	29 February 1968 (aged 25)	(Costa Rican Football Federation) Turrialba
14	MF	Floyd Guthrie	14 March 1966 (aged 27)	(Costa Rican Football Federation) Turrialba
15	MF	Sergio Morales	16 February 1973 (aged 20)	(Costa Rican Football Federation) Ramonense
16	GK	Alexis Rojas		(Costa Rican Football Federation) Alajuelense
17	DF	Maximilian Peynado	8 September 1970 (aged 22)	(Costa Rican Football Federation) Turrialba
18	FW	Ronald Gómez	24 January 1975 (aged 18)	(Costa Rican Football Federation) Carmelita
19	MF	Erick Rodríguez	8 December 1968 (aged 24)	(Costa Rican Football Federation) Cartaginés
20	GK	Fernando Patterson	2 November 1970 (aged 22)	(Costa Rican Football Federation) Turrialba

=== Martinique ===
Head coach: (Martinique) Raymond Destin

No.	Pos.	Player	Date of birth (age)	Club
1	GK	Mark Lagier		(Ligue de football de la Martinique) Club Franciscain
2	DF	Patrick Antonin	13 September 1967 (aged 25)	(Ligue de football de la Martinique) AS New Club
3	DF	Merlin Boungo		(Ligue de football de la Martinique) US Robert
4	MF	Maurice Narcisse	23 May 1965 (aged 28)	(Ligue de football de la Martinique) Club Colonial
5	DF	Thierry Tinmar	19 May 1963 (aged 30)	(Ligue de football de la Martinique) Club Franciscain
6	MF	Camille Marguerite		(Ligue de football de la Martinique)
7	FW	Jean-Michel Modestin	19 January 1971 (aged 22)	(Ligue de football de la Martinique) Club Franciscain
8	MF	Muriel Valide	28 March 1969 (aged 24)	(Ligue de football de la Martinique) Rivière-Pilote
9	FW	Georges Gertrude	1 January 1965 (aged 28)	(Ligue de football de la Martinique) Golden Star
10	FW	Jean-Pierre Honoré	7 December 1968 (aged 24)	(Ligue de football de la Martinique) Club Franciscain
11	MF	Charles-Édouard Coridon	9 April 1973 (aged 20)	(Ligue de football de la Martinique) Club Franciscain
12	DF	Dominique Zaïre	4 April 1967 (aged 26)	(Ligue de football de la Martinique) Club Franciscain
13	MF	Jean-Hubert Sophie	16 June 1970 (aged 23)	(Ligue de football de la Martinique) Club Franciscain
14	FW	Daniel Borval	28 March 1968 (aged 25)	(Ligue de football de la Martinique) Club Franciscain
15	FW	Jean-Marc Émica		(Ligue de football de la Martinique) Club Franciscain
16	DF	Angebert Bellemare	28 June 1961 (aged 32)	(Ligue de football de la Martinique) Olympique Du Marin
17	MF	Philibert Carole	27 December 1966 (aged 26)	(Ligue de football de la Martinique) US Robert
18	FW	Thierry Fondelot	19 June 1970 (aged 23)	(Ligue de football de la Martinique) Golden Star
19	MF	Dominique Lagin		(Ligue de football de la Martinique)
21	GK	Jocelyn Modestin	28 October 1959 (aged 33)	(Ligue de football de la Martinique)

=== Mexico ===
Head coach: (Mexico) Miguel Mejía Barón

No.	Pos.	Player	Date of birth (age)	Club
1	GK	Jorge Campos	15 October 1966 (aged 26)	(Mexican Football Federation) UNAM
2	DF	Claudio Suárez	17 December 1968 (aged 24)	(Mexican Football Federation) UNAM
3	DF	Juan de Dios Ramírez Perales	8 March 1969 (aged 24)	(Mexican Football Federation) UNAM
4	MF	Ignacio Ambriz	7 February 1965 (aged 28)	(Mexican Football Federation) Necaxa
5	MF	Ramón Ramírez	5 December 1969 (aged 23)	(Mexican Football Federation) Santos Laguna
6	DF	Juan Hernández	8 March 1965 (aged 28)	(Mexican Football Federation) América
7	DF	Abraham Nava	23 January 1964 (aged 29)	(Mexican Football Federation) Necaxa
8	MF	Alberto Coyote	26 March 1967 (aged 26)	(Mexican Football Federation) León
9	FW	Luis Miguel Salvador	26 February 1965 (aged 28)	(Mexican Football Federation) Atlante
10	FW	Octavio Mora	28 November 1965 (aged 27)	(Mexican Football Federation) Leones Negros UdeG
11	FW	Luís Roberto Alves	23 May 1967 (aged 26)	(Mexican Football Federation) América
12	GK	Alejandro García	26 February 1961 (aged 32)	(Mexican Football Federation) América
13	DF	Ricardo Cadena	23 October 1969 (aged 23)	(Mexican Football Federation) Guadalajara
14	DF	José Luis Montes de Oca	21 December 1967 (aged 25)	(Mexican Football Federation) Guadalajara
15	DF	Carlos Turrubiates	23 January 1968 (aged 25)	(Mexican Football Federation) León
16	MF	Juan Carlos Chávez	18 January 1967 (aged 26)	(Mexican Football Federation) Atlas
17	MF	José Antonio Noriega	29 December 1969 (aged 23)	(Mexican Football Federation) Monterrey
18	MF	Guillermo Cantú	12 January 1968 (aged 25)	(Mexican Football Federation) Atlante
19	MF	Joaquín Del Olmo	20 April 1969 (aged 24)	(Mexican Football Federation) Veracruz
20	MF	Jorge Rodríguez	18 April 1968 (aged 25)	(Mexican Football Federation) Toluca
