= Mexico at the CONCACAF Gold Cup =

Mexico at North America's major tournament

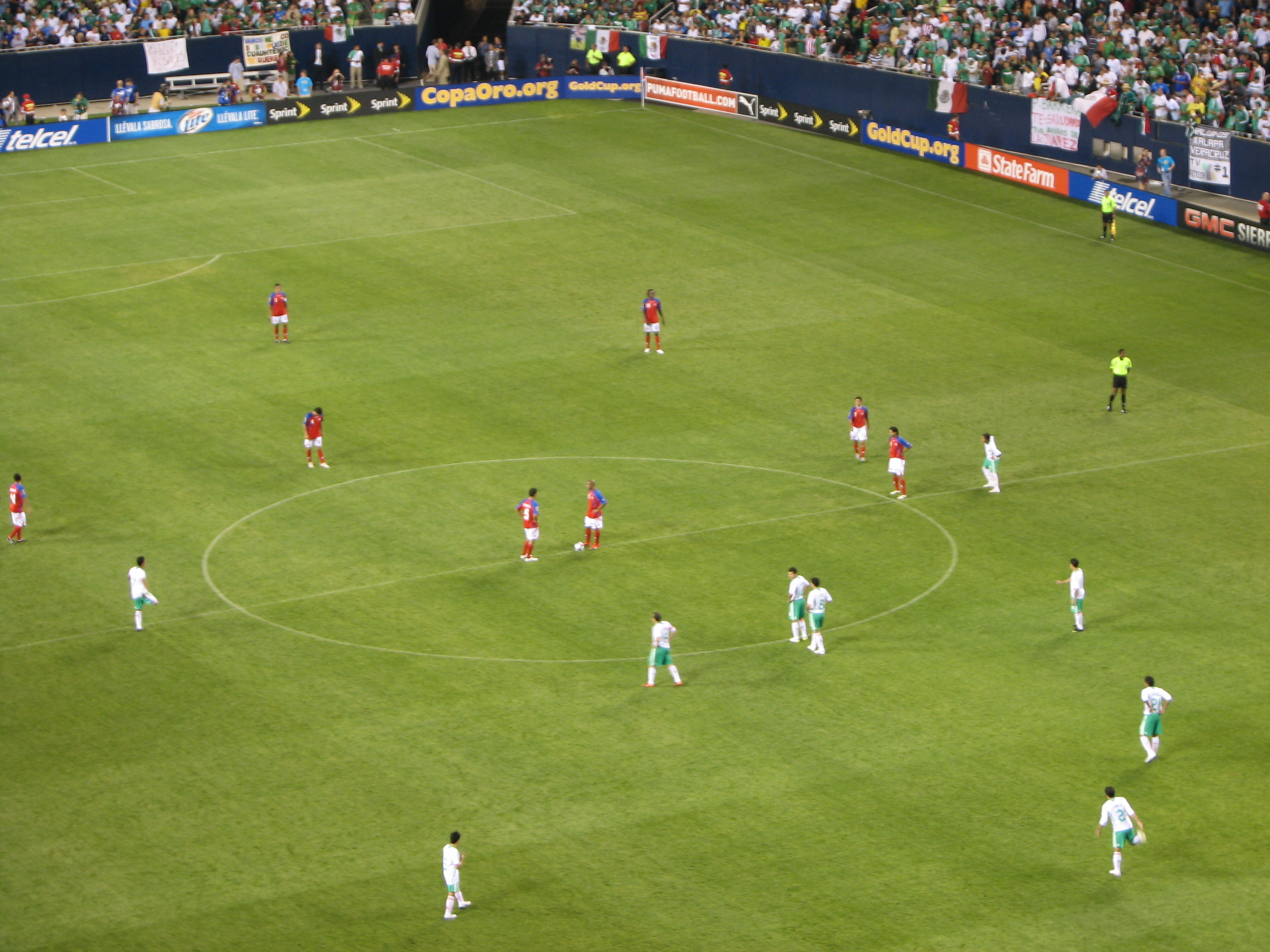
Scene from the 2009 semi-final against Costa Rica. Mexico went on to win the tournament, and their eighth of eleven continental championships.

The CONCACAF Gold Cup is North America's major tournament in senior men's soccer and determines the continental champion. Until 1989, the tournament was known as CONCACAF Championship. It is currently held every two years. From 1996 to 2005, nations from other confederations have regularly joined the tournament as invitees. In earlier editions, the continental championship was held in different countries, but since the inception of the Gold Cup in 1991, the United States are constant hosts or co-hosts.

From 1973 to 1989, the tournament doubled as the confederation's World Cup qualification. CONCACAF's representative team at the FIFA Confederations Cup was decided by a play-off between the winners of the last two tournament editions in 2015 via the CONCACAF Cup, but was then discontinued along with the Confederations Cup.

Mexico are the most successful team in the history of CONCACAF continental championships. They have won the most titles, with thirteen (ten in the Gold Cup era), and hold various records. They hosted the tournament once, in 1977, and were co-hosts with the United States in 1993 and 2003. On all three occasions, Mexico won the title on home soil.

== Overall record ==
CONCACAF Championship & Gold Cup record										Qualification record					
Year	Round	Position	Pld	W	D*	L	GF	GA	Squad	Pld	W	D	L	GF	GA
(El Salvador) 1963	Group stage	7th	3	1	1	1	9	2	Squad	Qualified automatically					
(Guatemala) 1965	Champions	1st	5	4	1	0	13	2	Squad	Automatically entered					
(Honduras) 1967	Runners-up	2nd	5	4	0	1	10	1	Squad	Qualified as defending champions					
(Costa Rica) 1969	Fourth place	4th	5	1	2	2	4	5	Squad	2	1	0	1	4	2
(Trinidad and Tobago) 1971	Champions	1st	5	4	1	0	6	1	Squad	2	2	0	0	6	0
(Haiti) 1973	Third place	3rd	5	2	2	1	10	5	Squad	4	4	0	0	8	3
(Mexico) 1977	Champions	1st	5	5	0	0	20	5	Squad	4	1	2	1	3	1
(Honduras) 1981	Third place	3rd	5	1	3	1	6	3	Squad	4	1	2	1	8	5
1985	Withdrew to host the 1986 FIFA World Cup									Withdrew					
1989	Banned									Banned					
(United States) 1991	Third place	3rd	5	3	1	1	10	5	Squad	Qualified automatically					
(Mexico) (United States) 1993	Champions	1st	5	4	1	0	28	2	Squad	Qualified automatically					
(United States) 1996	Champions	1st	4	4	0	0	9	0	Squad	Qualified automatically					
(United States) 1998	Champions	1st	4	4	0	0	8	2	Squad	Qualified automatically					
(United States) 2000	Quarter-finals	7th	3	1	1	1	6	3	Squad	Qualified automatically					
(United States) 2002	Quarter-finals	5th	3	2	1	0	4	1	Squad	Qualified automatically					
(Mexico) (United States) 2003	Champions	1st	5	4	1	0	9	0	Squad	Qualified automatically					
(United States) 2005	Quarter-finals	6th	4	2	0	2	7	4	Squad	Qualified automatically					
(United States) 2007	Runners-up	2nd	6	4	0	2	7	5	Squad	Qualified automatically					
(United States) 2009	Champions	1st	6	5	1	0	15	2	Squad	Qualified automatically					
(United States) 2011	Champions	1st	6	6	0	0	22	4	Squad	Qualified automatically					
(United States) 2013	Semi-finals	3rd	5	3	0	2	8	5	Squad	Qualified automatically					
(Canada) (United States) 2015	Champions	1st	6	4	2	0	16	6	Squad	Qualified automatically					
(United States) 2017	Semi-finals	3rd	5	3	1	1	6	2	Squad	Qualified automatically					
(United States) (Costa Rica) (Jamaica) 2019	Champions	1st	6	5	1	0	16	4	Squad	Qualified automatically					
(United States) 2021	Runners-up	2nd	6	4	1	1	9	2	Squad	4	4	0	0	13	3
(Canada) (United States) 2023	Champions	1st	6	5	0	1	13	2	Squad	4	2	2	0	8	3
(Canada) (United States) 2025	Champions	1st	6	5	1	0	10	3	Squad	4	3	0	1	8	3
Total	13 Titles	26/28	129	90	22	17	281	76		28	18	6	4	58	20

== Match overview ==
All-time matches at the CONCACAF Championship & CONCACAF Gold Cup
Year	Round	Opponent	Score	Result	Venue	City	Mexico scorer(s)
(El Salvador) 1963	Group B	Netherlands Antilles	1–2	L	Santaneco	Santa Ana	
(El Salvador) 1963	Group B	Jamaica	8–0	W	Santaneco	Santa Ana	
(El Salvador) 1963	Group B	Costa Rica	0–0	D	Santaneco	Santa Ana	
(Guatemala) 1965	Final phase	El Salvador	2–0	W		Guatemala City	
(Guatemala) 1965	Final phase	Netherlands Antilles	5–0	W		Guatemala City	
(Guatemala) 1965	Final phase	Haiti	3–0	W		Guatemala City	
(Guatemala) 1965	Final phase	Costa Rica	1–1	D		Guatemala City	
(Guatemala) 1965	Final phase	Guatemala	2–1	W		Guatemala City	
(Honduras) 1967	Final phase	Nicaragua	4–0	W		Tegucigalpa	
(Honduras) 1967	Final phase	Guatemala	0–1	L		Tegucigalpa	
(Honduras) 1967	Final phase	Trinidad and Tobago	4–0	W		Tegucigalpa	
(Honduras) 1967	Final phase	Haiti	1–0	W		Tegucigalpa	
(Honduras) 1967	Final phase	Honduras	1–0	W		Tegucigalpa	
(Costa Rica) 1969	Final phase	Jamaica	2–0	W	Nacional	San José	
(Costa Rica) 1969	Final phase	Costa Rica	0–2	L	Nacional	San José	
(Costa Rica) 1969	Final phase	Guatemala	0–1	L	Nacional	San José	
(Costa Rica) 1969	Final phase	Netherlands Antilles	2–2	D	Nacional	San José	
(Costa Rica) 1969	Final phase	Trinidad and Tobago	0–0	D	Nacional	San José	
(Trinidad and Tobago) 1971	Final phase	Haiti	0–0	D		Port of Spain	
(Trinidad and Tobago) 1971	Final phase	Trinidad and Tobago	2–0	W		Port of Spain	
(Trinidad and Tobago) 1971	Final phase	Cuba	1–0	W		Port of Spain	
(Trinidad and Tobago) 1971	Final phase	Costa Rica	1–0	W		Port of Spain	
(Trinidad and Tobago) 1971	Final phase	Honduras	2–1	W		Port of Spain	
(Trinidad and Tobago) 1973	Final phase	Guatemala	0–0	D		Port-au-Prince	
(Trinidad and Tobago) 1973	Final phase	Honduras	1–1	D		Port-au-Prince	
(Trinidad and Tobago) 1973	Final phase	Netherlands Antilles	8–0	W		Port-au-Prince	
(Trinidad and Tobago) 1973	Final phase	Trinidad and Tobago	0–4	L		Port-au-Prince	
(Trinidad and Tobago) 1973	Final phase	Haiti	1–0	W		Port-au-Prince	
(Mexico) 1977	Final phase	Haiti	4–1	W	Azteca	Mexico City	
(Mexico) 1977	Final phase	El Salvador	3–1	W	Azteca	Mexico City	
(Mexico) 1977	Final phase	Suriname	8–1	W	Universitario	San Nicolás de los Garza	
(Mexico) 1977	Final phase	Guatemala	2–1	W	Azteca	Mexico City	
(Mexico) 1977	Final phase	Canada	3–1	W	Universitario	San Nicolás de los Garza	
(Honduras) 1981	Final phase	Cuba	4–0	W	Nacional	Tegucigalpa	
(Honduras) 1981	Final phase	El Salvador	0–1	L	Nacional	Tegucigalpa	
(Honduras) 1981	Final phase	Haiti	1–1	D	Nacional	Tegucigalpa	
(Honduras) 1981	Final phase	Canada	1–1	D	Nacional	Tegucigalpa	
(Honduras) 1981	Final phase	Honduras	0–0	D	Nacional	Tegucigalpa	
All-time matches at the CONCACAF Gold Cup
Year	Round	Opponent	Score	Result	Venue	City	Mexico scorer(s)
(United States) 1991	Group A	Jamaica	4–1	W	Memorial Coliseum	Los Angeles	
(United States) 1991	Group A	Canada	3–1	W	Memorial Coliseum	Los Angeles	
(United States) 1991	Group A	Honduras	1–1	D	Memorial Coliseum	Los Angeles	
(United States) 1991	Semi-finals	United States	0–2	L	Memorial Coliseum	Los Angeles	
(United States) 1991	Third place	Costa Rica	2–0	W	Memorial Coliseum	Los Angeles	
(Mexico) 1993	Group B	Martinique	9–0	W	Azteca	Mexico City	
(Mexico) 1993	Group B	Costa Rica	1–1	D	Azteca	Mexico City	
(Mexico) 1993	Group B	Canada	8–0	W	Azteca	Mexico City	
(Mexico) 1993	Semi-finals	Jamaica	6–1	W	Azteca	Mexico City	
(Mexico) 1993	Final	United States	4–0	W	Azteca	Mexico City	
(United States) 1996	Group A	Saint Vincent and the Grenadines	5–0	W	Jack Murphy	San Diego	L. García ∙ Peláez ∙ A. García
(United States) 1996	Group A	Guatemala	1–0	W	Jack Murphy	San Diego	Rizo
(United States) 1996	Semi-finals	Guatemala	1–0	W	Jack Murphy	San Diego	Blanco
(United States) 1996	Final	Brazil	2–0	W	Memorial Coliseum	Los Angeles	L. García ∙ Blanco
(United States) 1998	Group B	Trinidad and Tobago	4–2	W	Coliseum	Oakland	
(United States) 1998	Group B	Honduras	2–0	W	Coliseum	Oakland	
(United States) 1998	Semi-finals	Jamaica	1–0 (a.s.d.e.t.)	W	Memorial Coliseum	Los Angeles	Hernández
(United States) 1998	Final	United States	1–0	W	Memorial Coliseum	Los Angeles	Hernández
(United States) 2000	Group C	Trinidad and Tobago	4–0	W	Qualcomm Stadium	San Diego	Márquez, Hernández, David (o.g.), Palencia
(United States) 2000	Group C	Guatemala	1–1	D	Memorial Coliseum	Los Angeles	Mora
(United States) 2000	Quarter-finals	Canada	1–2 (a.s.d.e.t.)	L	Qualcomm Stadium	San Diego	Ramírez
(United States) 2002	Group A	El Salvador	1–0	W	Rose Bowl	Pasadena	García
(United States) 2002	Group A	Guatemala	3–1	W	Rose Bowl	Pasadena	Bautista, Garcés, Ochoa
(United States) 2002	Quarter-finals	South Korea	0–0 (a.e.t.) (2–4 p)	D	Rose Bowl	Pasadena	—
(Mexico) (United States) 2003	Group A	Brazil	1–0	W	Azteca	Mexico City	Borgetti
(Mexico) (United States) 2003	Group A	Honduras	0–0	D	Azteca	Mexico City	—
(Mexico) (United States) 2003	Quarter-finals	Jamaica	5–0	W	Azteca	Mexico City	Bravo, García, Osorno, Borgetti, Rodríguez
(Mexico) (United States) 2003	Semi-finals	Costa Rica	2–0	W	Azteca	Mexico City	Márquez, Borgetti
(Mexico) (United States) 2003	Final	Brazil	1–0 (a.s.d.e.t.)	W	Azteca	Mexico City	Osorno
(United States) 2005	Group C	South Africa	1–2	L	Home Depot Center	Carson	Rodríguez
(United States) 2005	Group C	Guatemala	4–0	W	Memorial Coliseum	Los Angeles	Borgetti (2), Galindo, Bravo
(United States) 2005	Group C	Jamaica	1–0	W	Reliant	Houston	Medina
(United States) 2005	Quarter-finals	Colombia	1–2	L	Reliant	Houston	Pineda
(United States) 2007	Group C	Cuba	2–1	W	Giants Stadium	East Rutherford	Borgetti, Castillo
(United States) 2007	Group C	Honduras	1–2	L	Giants Stadium	East Rutherford	Blanco
(United States) 2007	Group C	Panama	1–0	W	Reliant Stadium	Houston	Salcido
(United States) 2007	Quarter-finals	Costa Rica	1–0 (a.e.t.)	W	Reliant Stadium	Houston	Borgetti
(United States) 2007	Semi-finals	Guadeloupe	1–0	W	Soldier Field	Chicago	Pardo
(United States) 2007	Final	United States	1–2	L	Soldier Field	Chicago	Guardado
(United States) 2009	Group C	Nicaragua	2–0	W	Oakland–Alameda County Coliseum	Oakland	Noriega, Barrera
(United States) 2009	Group C	Panama	1–1	D	Reliant Stadium	Houston	Sabah
(United States) 2009	Group C	Guadeloupe	2–0	W	University of Phoenix Stadium	Glendale	Torrado, Sabah
(United States) 2009	Quarter-finals	Haiti	4–0	W	Cowboys Stadium	Arlington	Sabah (2), G. Dos Santos, Barrera
(United States) 2009	Semi-finals	Costa Rica	1–1 (a.e.t.) (5–3 p)	D	Soldier Field	Chicago	Franco
(United States) 2009	Final	United States	5–0	W	Giants Stadium	East Rutherford	Torrado, G. Dos Santos, Vela, Castro, Franco
(United States) 2011	Group A	El Salvador	5–0	W	Cowboys Stadium	Arlington	Juárez, De Nigris, J. Hernández (3)
(United States) 2011	Group A	Cuba	5–0	W	Bank of America Stadium	Charlotte	J. Hernández (2), G. Dos Santos (2), De Nigris
(United States) 2011	Group A	Costa Rica	4–1	W	Soldier Field	Chicago	Márquez, Guardado (2), Barrera
(United States) 2011	Quarter-finals	Guatemala	2–1	W	New Meadowlands Stadium	East Rutherford	De Nigris, J. Hernández
(United States) 2011	Semi-finals	Honduras	2–0 (a.e.t.)	W	Reliant Stadium	Houston	De Nigris, J. Hernández
(United States) 2011	Final	United States	4–2	W	Rose Bowl	Pasadena	Barrera (2), Guardado, G. Dos Santos
(United States) 2013	Group A	Panama	1–2	L	Rose Bowl	Pasadena	Fabián
(United States) 2013	Group A	Canada	2–0	W	CenturyLink Field	Seattle	Jiménez, Fabián
(United States) 2013	Group A	Martinique	3–1	W	Sports Authority Field	Denver	Fabián, Montes, Ponce
(United States) 2013	Quarter-finals	Trinidad and Tobago	1–0	W	Georgia Dome	Atlanta	Jiménez
(United States) 2013	Semi-finals	Panama	1–2	L	Cowboys Stadium	Arlington	Montes
(Canada) (United States) 2015	Group C	Cuba	6–0	W	Soldier Field	Chicago	Peralta (3), Vela, Guardado, G. Dos Santos
(Canada) (United States) 2015	Group C	Guatemala	0–0	D	University of Phoenix Stadium	Glendale	—
(Canada) (United States) 2015	Group C	Trinidad and Tobago	4–4	D	Bank of America Stadium	Charlotte	Aguilar, Vela, Guardado, K. Jones (o.g.)
(Canada) (United States) 2015	Quarter-finals	Costa Rica	1–0 (a.e.t.)	W	MetLife Stadium	East Rutherford	Guardado
(Canada) (United States) 2015	Semi-finals	Panama	2–1 (a.e.t.)	W	Georgia Dome	Atlanta	Guardado (2)
(Canada) (United States) 2015	Final	Jamaica	3–1	W	Lincoln Financial Field	Philadelphia	Guardado, Corona, Peralta
(United States) 2017	Group C	El Salvador	3–1	W	Qualcomm Stadium	San Diego	Marín, E. Hernández, Pineda
(United States) 2017	Group C	Jamaica	0–0	D	Sports Authority Field	Denver	—
(United States) 2017	Group C	Curaçao	2–0	W	Alamodome	San Antonio	Sepúlveda, Álvarez
(United States) 2017	Quarter-finals	Honduras	1–0	W	State Farm Stadium	Glendale	Pizarro
(United States) 2017	Semi-finals	Jamaica	0–1	L	Rose Bowl	Pasadena	—
(United States) (Costa Rica) (Jamaica) 2019	Group A	Cuba	7–0	W	Rose Bowl	Pasadena	Antuna (3), Jiménez (2), Reyes, Vega
(United States) (Costa Rica) (Jamaica) 2019	Group A	Canada	3–1	W	Broncos Stadium at Mile High	Denver	Alvarado, Guardado (2)
(United States) (Costa Rica) (Jamaica) 2019	Group A	Martinique	3–2	W	Bank of America Stadium	Charlotte	Antuna, Jiménez, Navarro
(United States) (Costa Rica) (Jamaica) 2019	Quarter-finals	Costa Rica	1–1 (a.e.t.) (5–4 p)	D	NRG Stadium	Houston	Jiménez
(United States) (Costa Rica) (Jamaica) 2019	Semi-finals	Haiti	1–0 (a.e.t.)	W	State Farm Stadium	Glendale	Jiménez
(United States) (Costa Rica) (Jamaica) 2019	Final	United States	1–0	W	Soldier Field	Chicago	J. Dos Santos
(United States) 2021	Group A	Trinidad and Tobago	0–0	D	AT&T Stadium	Arlington	—
(United States) 2021	Group A	Guatemala	3–0	W	Cotton Bowl	Dallas	Funes Mori (2), Pineda
(United States) 2021	Group A	El Salvador	1–0	W	Cotton Bowl	Dallas	Rodríguez
(United States) 2021	Quarter-finals	Honduras	3–0	W	State Farm Stadium	Glendale	Funes Mori, J. Dos Santos, Pineda
(United States) 2021	Semi-finals	Canada	2–1	W	NRG Stadium	Houston	Pineda, Herrera
(United States) 2021	Final	United States	0–1 (a.e.t.)	L	Allegiant Stadium	Paradise	—
(Canada) (United States) 2023	Group B	Honduras	4–0	W	NRG Stadium	Houston	Romo (2), Pineda, Chávez
(Canada) (United States) 2023	Group B	Haiti	3–1	W	State Farm Stadium	Glendale	Martín, Adé (o.g.), Giménez
(Canada) (United States) 2023	Group B	Qatar	0–1	L	Levi's Stadium	Santa Clara	—
(Canada) (United States) 2023	Quarter-finals	Costa Rica	2–0	W	AT&T Stadium	Arlington	Pineda, É. Sanchez
(Canada) (United States) 2023	Semi-finals	Jamaica	3–0	W	Allegiant Stadium	Paradise	Martín, Chávez, Alvarado
(Canada) (United States) 2023	Final	Panama	1–0	W	SoFi Stadium	Inglewood	Giménez
(Canada) (United States) 2025	Group A	Dominican Republic	3–2	W	SoFi Stadium	Inglewood	Álvarez, Jiménez, Montes
(Canada) (United States) 2025	Group A	Suriname	2–0	W	AT&T Stadium	Arlington	Montes (2)
(Canada) (United States) 2025	Group A	Costa Rica	0–0	D	Allegiant Stadium	Paradise	—
(Canada) (United States) 2025	Quarter-finals	Saudi Arabia	2–0	W	State Farm Stadium	Glendale	Vega, Madu (o.g.)
(Canada) (United States) 2025	Semi-finals	Honduras	1–0	W	Levi's Stadium	Santa Clara	Jiménez
(Canada) (United States) 2025	Final	United States	2–1	W	NRG Stadium	Houston	Jiménez, Álvarez

== Winning finals ==
The CONCACAF Championship was played in round-robins rather than knockout matches. For the three titles in that era, the decisive matches are listed.

Year	Opponent	Result	Manager	Goalscorer(s)	Final location
1965	Guatemala	2–1	(Mexico) Ignacio Trelles	E. Cisneros, J. Fragoso	Guatemala City
1971	Honduras	2–1	(Mexico) Javier de la Torre	O. Muciño (2)	(Trinidad and Tobago) Port-of-Spain
1977	Canada	3–1	(Mexico) José Antonio Roca	J. Guzmán (2), H. Sánchez	(Mexico) Monterrey
1993	United States	4–0	(Mexico) Miguel Mejía Barón	I. Ambriz, D. Armstrong (o.g.), Zague, G. Cantú	Mexico City
1996	Brazil	2–0	(Socialist Federal Republic of Yugoslavia) Bora Milutinović	L. García, C. Blanco	(United States) Los Angeles
1998	United States	1–0	(Mexico) Manuel Lapuente	L. Hernández	(United States) Los Angeles
2003	Brazil	1–0 (a.s.d.e.t.)	(Argentina) Ricardo La Volpe	D. Osorno	Mexico City
2009	United States	5–0	(Mexico) Javier Aguirre	G. Torrado, G. Dos Santos, C. Vela, J. Castro, G. Franco	(United States) East Rutherford
2011	United States	4–2	(Mexico) José Manuel de la Torre	P. Barrera (2), A. Guardado, G. Dos Santos	(United States) Pasadena
2015	Jamaica	3–1	(Mexico) Miguel Herrera	A. Guardado, J. Corona, O. Peralta	(United States) Philadelphia
2019	United States	1–0	(Argentina) Gerardo Martino	J. Dos Santos	(United States) Chicago
2023	Panama	1–0	(Mexico) Jaime Lozano	S. Giménez	(United States) Inglewood
2025	United States	2–1	(Mexico) Javier Aguirre	R. Jiménez, E. Álvarez	(United States) Houston

== Record by opponent ==
Mexico have a positive record against every team they have played from CONCACAF. However, due to losses against invitees, they have negative records against Colombia, South Africa and Qatar. Notably, they were matched up with record world champions Brazil three times, and won all three matches without conceding.

CONCACAF Championship/Gold Cup matches (by team)
Opponent	W	D	L	Pld	GF	GA
Brazil	3	0	0	3	4	0
Canada	6	1	1	8	23	7
Colombia	0	0	1	1	1	2
Costa Rica	7	6	1	14	17	7
Cuba	6	0	0	6	25	1
Dominican Republic	1	0	0	1	3	2
El Salvador	6	0	1	7	15	3
Guadeloupe	2	0	0	2	3	0
Guatemala	8	3	2	13	19	7
Haiti	7	2	0	9	18	3
Honduras	8	4	1	13	19	5
Jamaica	9	1	1	11	33	4
Martinique	3	0	0	3	15	3
Netherlands Antilles / Curaçao	3	1	1	5	18	4
Nicaragua	2	0	0	2	6	0
Panama	3	1	2	6	7	6
Qatar	0	0	1	1	0	1
Saint Vincent and the Grenadines	1	0	0	1	5	0
Saudi Arabia	1	0	0	1	2	0
South Africa	0	0	1	1	1	2
South Korea	0	1	0	1	0	0
Suriname	2	0	0	2	10	1
Trinidad and Tobago	5	3	1	9	19	10
United States	6	0	3	9	18	8

== Record players ==
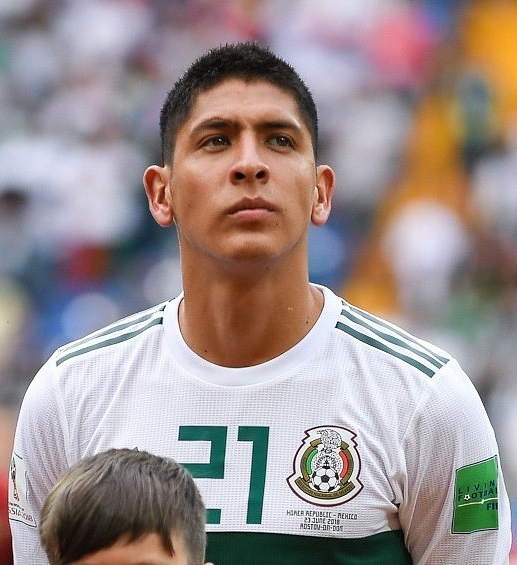
Edson Álvarez has made the most appearances for Mexico at the Gold Cup.

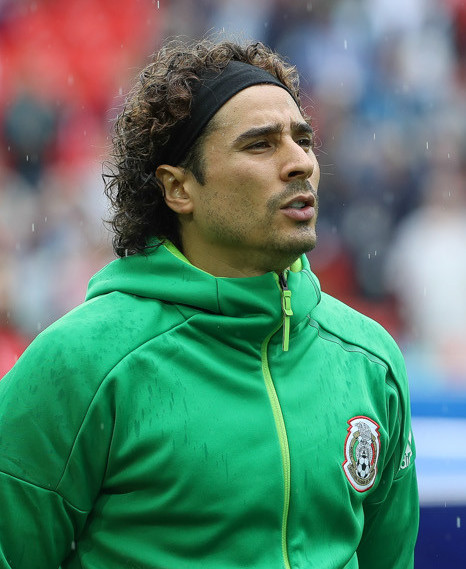
Guillermo Ochoa has won a record six Gold Cup titles with Mexico.

Edson Álvarez is Mexico's record appearance holders at continental championships, with 28. Goalkeeper Guillermo Ochoa has won the title a record six times, in 2009, 2011, 2015, 2019, 2023 and 2025. From the pre-Gold Cup era, the most fielded player is defender Jesús del Muro, with 13 matches from 1963 to 1967.

Rank	Player	Matches	Gold Cups
1	Edson Álvarez	28	2017, 2019, 2021, 2023 and 2025
2	Jesús Gallardo	27	2017, 2019, 2021, 2023 and 2025
3	Guillermo Ochoa	25	2007, 2009, 2011, 2015, 2019 and 2023
4	Andrés Guardado	24	2007, 2011, 2015 and 2019
5	Orbelín Pineda	22	2017, 2019, 2021, 2023 and 2025
6	Gerardo Torrado	20	2000, 2007, 2009 and 2011
7	Roberto Alvarado	18	2019, 2023 and 2025
8	Jonathan dos Santos	17	2015, 2019 and 2021
8	Raúl Jiménez	17	2013, 2019 and 2025
10	Ramón Ramírez	16	1993, 1996, 1998 and 2000
10	Claudio Suárez	16	1993, 1996, 1998 and 2000
10	Carlos Salcido	16	2005, 2007 and 2011
10	Francisco Rodríguez	16	2005, 2007, 2011 and 2015

== Top goalscorers ==
Rank	Player	Goals	Gold Cups
1	Luís Roberto Alves	12	1991 (1) and 1993 (11)
1	Andrés Guardado	12	2007 (1), 2011 (3), 2015 (6) and 2019 (2)
3	Raúl Jiménez	10	2013 (2), 2019 (5) and 2025 (3)
4	Hugo Sánchez	7	1977 (4) and 1981 (3)
4	Jared Borgetti	7	2003 (3), 2005 (2) and 2007 (2)
4	Javier Hernández	7	2011
7	Víctor Rangel	6	1977
7	Giovani Dos Santos	6	2009 (2), 2011 (3) and 2015 (1)
7	Orbelín Pineda	6	2017 (1), 2021 (3) and 2023 (2)
10	Ernesto Cisneros	5	1965
10	Javier Fragoso	5	1965
10	Luis Miguel Salvador	5	1993
10	Cuauhtémoc Blanco	5	1996 (2), 1998 (2) and 2007 (1)
10	Luis Hernández	5	1998 (4) and 2000 (1)
10	Pablo Barrera	5	2009 (2) and 2011 (3)

== Awards and records ==
Team awards

- Winners (13): 1965, 1971, 1977, 1993, 1996, 1998, 2003, 2009, 2011, 2015, 2019, 2023, 2025
- Runners-up (3): 1967, 2007, 2021
- Third place (5): 1973, 1981, 1991, 2013, 2017
- Fair play award: 2011

Individual awards

- Most Valuable Player:
  - Jorge Campos (1991)
  - Ramón Ramírez (1993)
  - Raúl Lara (1996)
  - Jesús Arellano (2003)
  - Giovani Dos Santos (2009)
  - Javier Hernández (2011)
  - Andrés Guardado (2015)
  - Raúl Jiménez (2019)
  - Héctor Herrera (2021)
  - Edson Álvarez (2025)
- Golden Boot:
  - Ernesto Cisneros (1965, 5 goals)
  - Víctor Rangel (1977, 6 goals)
  - Hugo Sánchez (1981, 3 goals)
  - Benjamín Galindo (1991, 4 goals)
  - Luís Roberto Alves (1993, 11 goals)
  - Luis Hernández (1998, 4 goals) (shared)
  - Miguel Sabah (2009, 4 goals)
  - Javier Hernández (2011, 7 goals)
- Best Goalkeeper:
  - Oswaldo Sánchez (2003)
  - Guillermo Ochoa (2019, 2023)
  - Luis Malagón (2025)
- Best Young Player:
  - Jesús Corona (2015)

Team records

- Most titles (13)
- Most titles in a row (3, 1993–1998)
- Most tournament participations (26)
- Most matches (129)
- Most victories (90)
- Most goals (281)
- Most goals in a single tournament (28, 1993)
- Only team to win a tournament without conceding (1996 and 2003)
- Highest victory (9–0 over Martinique, 11 July 1993)
- Highest victory in a final/Most goals in a final (5–0 over United States, 2009)

Individual records

- Most goals in one tournament: Luís Roberto Alves (11, 1993)
- Most goals in one match: Luís Roberto Alves (7, against Martinique, 11 July 1993)

== See also ==
- Mexico at the CONCACAF Nations League
- Mexico at the Copa América
- Mexico at the FIFA World Cup
