= 1993 CONCACAF Gold Cup final =

- Event: 1993 CONCACAF Gold Cup
| Mexico | United States |
| (Mexico) | (United States) |
| 4 | 0 |
- Date: 25 July 1993
- Venue: Estadio Azteca, Mexico City
- Referee: Robert Sawtell (Canada)
- Attendance: 120,000

The 1993 CONCACAF Gold Cup final was an association football match that took place on 25 July 1993 at the Estadio Azteca in Mexico City, Mexico, to determine the winner of the 1993 CONCACAF Gold Cup. This was the second final in the history of CONCACAF Gold Cup and second consecutive final for the United States after they beat Honduras in a penalty shootout in the 1991 final. They faced Mexico, who were making their first appearance in a Gold Cup Final. El Tri won the match 4–0 in front of 120,000 spectators.

As the Gold Cup champion, Mexico qualified as the CONCACAF representative in the 1995 King Fahd Cup in Saudi Arabia.

== Background ==
Prior to the match, Mexico were favorites to win it all after Zague had scored 10 goals in every match in the competition they had played except their 1–1 draw with Costa Rica. On the contrary, the United States had won all of their games by 1 goal, and scored a golden goal against Costa Rica in the semi-finals.

== Route to the final ==
United States
Round
Mexico
Opponents
Result
Group stage
Opponents
Result
Jamaica
1–0
Match 1
Martinique
9–0
Panama
2–1
Match 2
Costa Rica
1–1
Honduras
1–0
Match 3
Canada
8–0
Group A winners

| Pos | Team | Pld | Pts |
|---|---|---|---|
| 1 | United States | 3 | 9 |
| 2 | Jamaica | 3 | 4 |
| 3 | Honduras | 3 | 3 |
| 4 | Panama | 3 | 1 |

Final standings
Group B winners

| Pos | Team | Pld | Pts |
|---|---|---|---|
| 1 | Mexico | 3 | 7 |
| 2 | Costa Rica | 3 | 5 |
| 3 | Canada | 3 | 2 |
| 4 | Martinique | 3 | 1 |

Opponents
Result
Knockout stage
Opponents
Result
Costa Rica
1–0 (a.e.t.)
Semi-finals
Jamaica
6–1

== Match ==
=== Details ===
25 July 1993

| Mexico | 4–0 | United States |
|---|---|---|
| Ambríz 12'; Armstrong 31' (o.g.); Zague 71'; Cantú 80' | Report |

Estadio Azteca, Mexico City
Attendance: 120,000
Referee: Robert Sawtell (Canada)

| Mexico | United States |

| GK | 1 | Jorge Campos |
| RB | 6 | Juan Hernández |
| CB | 2 | Claudio Suárez |
| CB | 3 | Juan de Dios Ramírez Perales |
| LB | 5 | Ramón Ramírez |
| RM | 20 | Jorge Rodríguez |
| CM | 4 | Ignacio Ambríz (c) |
| LM | 19 | Joaquín Del Olmo |
| RW | 10 | Octavio Mora | | (substituted off) 76' |
| CF | 9 | Luis Miguel Salvador | | (substituted off) 76' |
| LW | 11 | Zague | (yellow card) 68' |
Substitutes:
| MF | 18 | Guillermo Cantú | | (substituted on) 76' |
| MF | 17 | José Antonio Noriega | | (substituted on) 76' |
Manager:
Miguel Mejía Barón

| GK | 1 | Tony Meola (c) |
| RB | 22 | Alexi Lalas |
| CB | 15 | Desmond Armstrong |
| CB | 4 | Cle Kooiman |
| LB | 3 | John Doyle |
| RM | 5 | Thomas Dooley |
| CM | 13 | Cobi Jones | (substituted off) 52' |
| CM | 6 | John Harkes |
| LM | 19 | Chris Henderson |
| CF | 17 | Roy Wegerle | (substituted off) 78' |
| CF | 11 | Eric Wynalda |
Substitutes:
| FW | 8 | Dominic Kinnear | (substituted on) 52' |
| FW | 14 | Joe-Max Moore | (substituted on) 78' |
Manager:
(Federal Republic of Yugoslavia) Bora Milutinović

Match rules

- 90 minutes.
- 30 minutes extra time if score levels after 90 minutes.
- Penalty shootout if scores still level after 120 minutes.
- Maximum of three substitutions.
