= List of CONCACAF Gold Cup stadiums =

19 draws Championship and CONCACAF Gold Cup held in eight countries-members of CONCACAF, and two draws (1985 and 1989) had not host countries: In general, during the period 1963–2011 as part of the final tournament held 389 matches, which were held in 48 stadiums of 42 cities in 9 countries (of which 28 stadiums in 26 cities located in the US): information on the number of cities differ, as part of the cities located within the agglomerations of Los Angeles and New York.

== Host countries ==
Times	Country	Date	CONCACAF Championship	CONCACAF Gold Cup
18	United States	1991, 1993 (Note: Co-hosted by United States and Mexico), 1996, 1998, 2000, 2002, 2003, 2005, 2007, 2009, 2011, 2013, 2015 (Note: Co-hosted by United States and Canada), 2017, 2019 (Note: Co-hosted by United States, Costa Rica and Jamaica), 2021, 2023, 2025	0	18
3	Mexico	1977, 1993, 2003	1	2
3	Canada	2015, 2023, 2025	0	3
2	Honduras	1967, 1981	2	0
2	Costa Rica	1969, 2019	1	1
1	El Salvador	1963	1	0
1	Guatemala	1965	1	0
1	Trinidad and Tobago	1971	1	0
1	Haiti	1973	1	0
1	Jamaica	2019	0	1
2	No Fixed	1985, 1989	2	0

== 1991 CONCACAF Gold Cup ==
The 1991 CONCACAF Gold Cup was the first edition of the Gold Cup, the football (soccer) championship of North America, Central America and the Caribbean (CONCACAF). The tournament was held in the United States, in California cities Los Angeles and Pasadena.

=== United States ===
Venue	Location	Capacity	Group phase	Knockout stage
Memorial Coliseum	Los Angeles	93,607	Group A, Group B	Semi-finals, third-place, and Final
Rose Bowl	Pasadena	92,542	Group B	

== 1993 CONCACAF Gold Cup ==
Mexico and the United States hosted the second edition of CONCACAF's premier men's football tournament. Mexico hosted Group B, a semi-final, the third place and Final at the Estadio Azteca. The United States hosted Group A and semi-final all played at the Cotton Bowl in Dallas.

=== Mexico ===
Venue	Location	Capacity	Group phase	Knockout stage
Estadio Azteca	Mexico City	105,000	Group B	1 semi-final, third-place and Final

=== United States ===
Venue	Location	Capacity	Group phase	Knockout stage
Cotton Bowl	Dallas	71,615	Group A	Semi-final

== 1996 CONCACAF Gold Cup ==
For the third edition, the tournament went back to the United States and California; the games were hosted by Los Angeles, San Diego, and Anaheim.

=== United States ===
Venue	Location	Capacity	Group phase	Knockout stage
Anaheim Stadium	Anaheim	64,593	Group A, Group B, and Group C	
Memorial Coliseum	Los Angeles	93,607	Group B	Semi-final, third-place and Final
Jack Murphy Stadium	San Diego	60,836	Group A	Semi-final

== 1998 CONCACAF Gold Cup ==
The 1998 CONCACAF Gold Cup was once again held in the United States, in Los Angeles, Miami, and Oakland.

=== United States ===
Venue	Location	Capacity	Group phase	Knockout stage
Oakland–Alameda County Coliseum	Oakland	63,026	Group B and Group C	
Memorial Coliseum	Los Angeles	93,607	Group A	Semi-finals, third-place and final
Orange Bowl	Miami	74,476	Group C	

== See also ==
- CONCACAF Championship
- CONCACAF Gold Cup
