= 1993 CONCACAF Gold Cup =

2nd edition of the CONCACAF Gold Cup

Copa Oro de la Concacaf 1993

Tournament details
- Host countries: Mexico; United States
- Dates: 10–25 July
- Teams: 8 (from 1 confederation)
- Venues: 2 (in 2 host cities)

Final positions
- Champions: Mexico (1st title)
- Runners-up: United States

Tournament statistics
- Matches played: 16
- Goals scored: 60 (3.75 per match)
- Attendance: 820,988 (51,312 per match)
- Top scorer: (Mexico) Zague (11 goals)
- Best player: (Mexico) Ramón Ramírez

The 1993 CONCACAF Gold Cup was the 2nd edition of the CONCACAF Gold Cup, the biennial international men's football championship of the North, Central American and Caribbean region organized by CONCACAF. The tournament took place from 10 to 25 July 1993 and jointly hosted by 2 cities in two North American countries: Mexico, and the United States.

Mexico were crowned the champions after winning the final against the title holder United States 4–0 . It was Mexico's fourth CONCACAF title and their first Gold Cup title.

== Venues ==
It was the first Gold Cup to be co-hosted; Group A was held in the United States (Dallas), and Group B in Mexico (Mexico City).

| Mexico | United States |
| Mexico City | Dallas |
|---|---|
| Estadio Azteca | Cotton Bowl |
| Capacity: 105,000 | Capacity: 71,615 |
1993 CONCACAF Gold Cup is located in CONCACAF

== Teams ==
=== Qualification ===
| Team | Qualification | Appearances | Last Appearance | Previous best performance | FIFA Ranking |
North American zone
| United States (TH) | Automatic | 2nd | 1991 | Champions (1991) | 24 |
| Mexico | Automatic | 2nd | 1991 | Third Place (1991) | 25 |
| Canada | Automatic | 2nd | 1991 | Group stage (1991) | 57 |
Caribbean zone qualified through the 1993 Caribbean Cup
| Martinique | Winners | 1st | None | Debut | N/A |
| Jamaica | Runners-up | 2nd | 1991 | Group stage (1991) | 67 |
Central American zone qualified through the 1993 UNCAF Nations Cup
| Honduras | Winners | 2nd | 1991 | Runners-up (1991) | 40 |
| Costa Rica | Runners-up | 2nd | 1991 | Fourth Place (1991) | 35 |
| Panama | Third Place | 1st | None | Debut | 120 |

=== Squads ===
The 8 national teams involved in the tournament were required to register a squad of 20 players; only players in these squads were eligible to take part in the tournament.

== Group stage ==
=== Group A ===
| Pos | Team | Pld | W | D | L | GF | GA | GD | Pts | Qualification |
|---|---|---|---|---|---|---|---|---|---|---|
| 1 | United States (H) | 3 | 3 | 0 | 0 | 4 | 1 | +3 | 6 | Advanced to knockout stage |
| 2 | Jamaica | 3 | 1 | 1 | 1 | 4 | 3 | +1 | 3 | Advanced to knockout stage |
| 3 | Honduras | 3 | 1 | 0 | 2 | 6 | 5 | +1 | 2 | |
| 4 | Panama | 3 | 0 | 1 | 2 | 3 | 8 | −5 | 1 | |

Source: CONCACAF
(H) Co-host
10 July 1993

| Honduras | 5–1 | Panama |
|---|---|---|
| Gayle 25'; Bennett 51', 69' (pen.), 82'; Pineda Chacón 54' | Report | Julio 29' |

Cotton Bowl, Dallas
Attendance: 11,642
Referee: Rodrigo Badilla (Costa Rica)
10 July 1993

| United States | 1–0 | Jamaica |
|---|---|---|
| Wynalda 67' | Report |

Cotton Bowl, Dallas
Attendance: 11,642
Referee: Berny Ulloa (Costa Rica)

14 July 1993

| Jamaica | 3–1 | Honduras |
|---|---|---|
| Jarrett 28'; Davis 48'; Boyd 77' | Report | Bennett 19' (pen.) |

Cotton Bowl, Dallas
Attendance: 13,771
Referee: Arturo Brizio Carter (Mexico)
14 July 1993

| United States | 2–1 | Panama |
|---|---|---|
| Wynalda 68'; Dooley 74' | Report | Piggott 32' |

Cotton Bowl, Dallas
Attendance: 13,771
Referee: Roberto Parisius (Suriname)

July 17, 1993

| Jamaica | 1–1 | Panama |
|---|---|---|
| Davis 76' | Report | Mendieta 50' (pen.) |

Cotton Bowl, Dallas
Attendance: 18,527
Referee: Antonio Marrufo (MEX)
July 17, 1993

| United States | 1–0 | Honduras |
|---|---|---|
| Lalas 29' | Report |

Cotton Bowl, Dallas
Attendance: 18,527
Referee: Robert Sawtell (CAN)

=== Group B ===
| Pos | Team | Pld | W | D | L | GF | GA | GD | Pts | Qualification |
|---|---|---|---|---|---|---|---|---|---|---|
| 1 | Mexico (H) | 3 | 2 | 1 | 0 | 18 | 1 | +17 | 5 | Advanced to knockout stage |
| 2 | Costa Rica | 3 | 1 | 2 | 0 | 5 | 3 | +2 | 4 | Advanced to knockout stage |
| 3 | Canada | 3 | 0 | 2 | 1 | 3 | 11 | −8 | 2 | |
| 4 | Martinique | 3 | 0 | 1 | 2 | 3 | 14 | −11 | 1 | |

Source: CONCACAF
(H) Co-host
11 July 1993

| Canada | 1–1 | Costa Rica |
|---|---|---|
| Dasovic 43' | Report | Myers 81' |

Estadio Azteca, Mexico City
Attendance: 17,000
Referee: Mark Forde (Brazil)
11 July 1993

| Mexico | 9–0 | Martinique |
|---|---|---|
| Zague 10', 21', 40', 52', 81', 84', 90'; R. Ramírez 40'; Hernández 90+1' | Report |

Estadio Azteca, Mexico City
Attendance: 82,300
Referee: José Alvarado (El Salvador)
Team details

| Mexico | Martinique |

| GK | 1 | Jorge Campos |
| RB | 6 | Juan Hernández |
| CB | 2 | Claudio Suárez |
| CB | 3 | Juan de Dios Ramírez Perales |
| LB | 7 | Abraham Nava |
| RM | 20 | Jorge Rodríguez |
| CM | 4 | Ignacio Ambriz |
| LM | 5 | Ramón Ramírez | (substituted off) 46' |
| RF | 10 | Octavio Mora |
| CF | 9 | Luis Miguel Salvador | (substituted off) 46' |
| LF | 11 | Luís Roberto Alves |
Substitutes:
| MF | 8 | Alberto Coyote | (substituted on) 46' |
| GK | 12 | Alejandro García | (substituted on) 46' |
| DF | 13 | Ricardo Cadena |
| DF | 14 | José Luis Montes de Oca |
| DF | 15 | Carlos Turrubiates |
| MF | 16 | Juan Carlos Chávez |
| MF | 17 | José Antonio Noriega |
| MF | 18 | Guillermo Cantú |
| MF | 19 | Joaquín Del Olmo |
Manager:
Miguel Mejia Baron

| GK | 1 | Mark Lagier |
| RB | 12 | Dominique Zaire |
| CB | 5 | Thierry Tinmar |
| CB | 8 | Muriel Valide | (substituted off) 64' |
| LB | 16 | Englebert Bellemare |
| RM | 11 | Charles-Édouard Coridon |
| CM | 2 | Patrick Antonin |
| CM | 10 | Jean-Pierre Honore | (substituted off) 64' |
| LM | 13 | Jean-Hubert Sophie |
| RF | 7 | Jean-Michel Modestin |
| LF | 14 | Daniel Borval |
Substitutes:
| DF | 3 | Menlin Boungo |
| MF | 4 | Maurice Narcisse | (substituted on) 64' |
| MF | 6 | Camille Marguerite |
| FW | 9 | Georges Gertrude |
| FW | 15 | Jean-Marc Emica | (substituted on) 64' |
| FW | 17 | Philibert Carole |
| FW | 18 | Thierry Fondelot |
| MF | 19 | Dominique Lagin |
| GK | 21 | Jocelyn Modestin |
Manager:
Raymond Destin

15 July 1993

| Canada | 2–2 | Martinique |
|---|---|---|
| Aunger 25'; Bunbury 43' | Report | Gertrude 53'; Fondelot 86' |

Estadio Azteca, Mexico City
Attendance: 31,000
Referee: Argelio Sabillón (Honduras)
15 July 1993

| Mexico | 1–1 | Costa Rica |
|---|---|---|
| Delgado 74' (o.g.) | Report | Cayasso 31' |

Estadio Azteca, Mexico City
Attendance: 92,350
Referee: Ramesh Ramdhan (Trinidad and Tobago)
Team details

| Mexico | Costa Rica |

| GK | 1 | Jorge Campos |
| RB | 6 | Juan Hernández |
| CB | 2 | Claudio Suárez |
| CB | 3 | Juan de Dios Ramírez Perales |
| LB | 7 | Abraham Nava |
| RM | 20 | Jorge Rodríguez | (substituted off) 45' |
| CM | 4 | Ignacio Ambriz |
| LM | 5 | Ramón Ramírez |
| RF | 9 | Luis Miguel Salvador |
| CF | 10 | Octavio Mora | (substituted off) 60' |
| LF | 11 | Luís Roberto Alves |
Substitutes:
| MF | 8 | Alberto Coyote | (substituted on) 45' |
| GK | 12 | Alejandro García |
| DF | 13 | Ricardo Cadena |
| DF | 14 | José Luis Montes de Oca |
| DF | 15 | Carlos Turrubiates |
| MF | 16 | Juan Carlos Chávez |
| MF | 17 | José Antonio Noriega | (substituted on) 60' |
| MF | 18 | Guillermo Cantú |
| MF | 19 | Joaquín Del Olmo |
Manager:
Miguel Mejia Baron

| GK | 1 | Erick Lonnis |
| DF | 17 | Maximilian Peynado |
| DF | 3 | Luis Marín |
| DF | 4 | Erick Mata |
| DF | 6 | Javier Delgado |
| MF | 8 | Giancarlo Morera |
| MF | 14 | Floyd Guthrie |
| MF | 19 | Erick Rodríguez | (substituted off) 63' |
| FW | 7 | Michael Myers | (substituted off) 63' |
| FW | 10 | Juan Cayasso |
| FW | 18 | Ronald Gómez |
Substitutes:
| DF | 2 | Reynaldo Parks |
| DF | 5 | Adolfo Rojas |
| FW | 9 | Roy Myers | (substituted on) 63' |
| MF | 11 | Carlos Luis Castro |
| MF | 12 | Johnny Murillo |
| MF | 13 | José Alberto Solano | (substituted on) 73' |
| MF | 15 | Sergio Morales |
| GK | 16 | Alexis Rojas |
| GK | 20 | Fernando Patterson |
Manager:
Álvaro Grant MacDonald

18 July 1993

| Costa Rica | 3–1 | Martinique |
|---|---|---|
| Myers 27'; Cayasso 69', 85' | Report | Tinmar 60' (pen.) |

Estadio Azteca, Mexico City
Attendance: 59,000
Referee: Majid Jay (United States)
18 July 1993

| Mexico | 8–0 | Canada |
|---|---|---|
| Rodríguez 4', 67'; Mora 24', 31'; Zague 34', 38'; Salvador 82', 85' | Report |

Estadio Azteca, Mexico City
Attendance: 100,000
Referee: Raúl Domínguez (United States)
Team details

| Mexico | Canada |

| GK | 1 | Jorge Campos |
| RB | 6 | Juan Hernández |
| CB | 2 | Claudio Suárez |
| CB | 3 | Juan de Dios Ramírez Perales |
| LB | 5 | Ramón Ramírez |
| RM | 20 | Jorge Rodríguez |
| CM | 4 | Ignacio Ambriz |
| LM | 19 | Joaquín Del Olmo |
| RF | 10 | Octavio Mora | (substituted off) 45' |
| CF | 9 | Luis Miguel Salvador |
| LF | 11 | Luís Roberto Alves | (substituted off) 52' |
Substitutes:
| DF | 7 | Abraham Nava |
| MF | 8 | Alberto Coyote |
| GK | 12 | Alejandro García | (substituted on) 52' |
| DF | 13 | Ricardo Cadena |
| DF | 14 | José Luis Montes de Oca |
| DF | 15 | Carlos Turrubiates |
| MF | 16 | Juan Carlos Chávez |
| MF | 17 | José Antonio Noriega |
| MF | 18 | Guillermo Cantú | (substituted on) 45' |
Manager:
Miguel Mejia Baron

| GK | 1 | Craig Forrest |
| DF | 2 | Frank Yallop |
| DF | 5 | Randy Samuel |
| DF | 6 | Colin Miller |
| DF | 16 | Mark Watson |
| MF | 4 | Nick Dasovic |
| MF | 8 | Lyndon Hooper |
| MF | 10 | Geoff Aunger |
| FW | 14 | Domenic Mobilio | (substituted off) 55' |
| FW | 11 | Roderick Scott | (substituted off) 86' |
| FW | 9 | Alex Bunbury |
Substitutes:
| DF | 3 | Enzo Concina | (substituted on) 86' |
| MF | 7 | John Limniatis |
| FW | 12 | Paul Peschisolido | (substituted on) 55' |
| FW | 13 | Niall Thompson |
| FW | 15 | Eddy Berdusco |
| DF | 17 | Paul Fenwick |
| GK | 18 | Pat Onstad |
Manager:
Bob Lenarduzzi

== Knockout stage ==
=== Bracket ===
Semi-finals
22 July – Mexico City
Mexico | 6
Jamaica | 1
21 July – Dallas
United States (a.s.d.e.t.) | 1
Costa Rica | 0

Final
25 July – Mexico City
Mexico | 4
United States | 0
Third place play-off
25 July – Mexico City
Costa Rica | 1
Jamaica | 1

=== Semi-finals ===
21 July 1993

| United States | 1–0 (a.e.t./g.g.) | Costa Rica |
|---|---|---|
| Kooiman 103' | Report |

Cotton Bowl, Dallas
Attendance: 15,826
Referee: Ramesh Ramdhan (Trinidad and Tobago)

22 July 1993

| Mexico | 6–1 | Jamaica |
|---|---|---|
| Salvador 9', 18', 34'; Mora 14'; Zague 51'; Ambríz 55' | Report | Wright 17' |

Estadio Azteca, Mexico City
Attendance: 110,000
Referee: Juan Escobar (Guatemala)
Team details

| Mexico | Jamaica |

| GK | 1 | Jorge Campos |
| RB | 6 | Juan Hernández |
| CB | 2 | Claudio Suárez |
| CB | 3 | Juan de Dios Ramírez Perales |
| LB | 5 | Ramón Ramírez | (substituted off) 58' |
| RM | 20 | Jorge Rodríguez |
| CM | 4 | Ignacio Ambriz |
| LM | 19 | Joaquín Del Olmo |
| RF | 10 | Octavio Mora | (substituted off) 59' |
| CF | 9 | Luis Miguel Salvador |
| LF | 11 | Luís Roberto Alves |
Substitutes:
| LB | 7 | Abraham Nava |
| MF | 8 | Alberto Coyote |
| GK | 12 | Alejandro García | (substituted on) 59' |
| DF | 13 | Ricardo Cadena |
| DF | 14 | José Luis Montes de Oca |
| DF | 15 | Carlos Turrubiates | (substituted on) 58' |
| MF | 16 | Juan Carlos Chávez |
| MF | 17 | José Antonio Noriega |
| MF | 18 | Guillermo Cantú |
Manager:
Miguel Mejia Baron

| GK | 1 | Warren Barrett |
| DF | 2 | Barrington Gaynor |
| DF | 3 | Dean Sewell |
| DF | 15 | Desmond Smith |
| DF | 21 | Durrant Brown |
| DF | 7 | Anthony Corbett |
| MF | 10 | Donald Hewitt | (substituted off) 61' |
| MF | 18 | Hector Wright |
| FW | 23 | Devon Jarrett | (substituted off) 61' |
| FW | 9 | Paul Davis |
| FW | 16 | Walter Boyd |
Substitutes:
| DF | 4 | Linval Dixon |
| FW | 8 | Byron Earle |
| MF | 11 | Winston Anglin |
| FW | 12 | Roderick Reid | (substituted on) 61' |
| DF | 17 | Ifidel Hamilton |
| DF | 20 | Anthony Dennis | (substituted on) 61' |
| GK | 22 | Clave Smith |
Manager:
Carl Brown

=== Third place play-off ===
25 July 1993

| Costa Rica | 1–1 | Jamaica |
|---|---|---|
| Guthrie 10' | Report | Jarret 89' |

Estadio Azteca, Mexico City
Attendance: 110,000
Referee: Mark Forde (Brazil)

Costa Rica and Jamaica shared the third place.

=== Final ===
25 July 1993

| Mexico | 4–0 | United States |
|---|---|---|
| Ambríz 12'; Armstrong 31' (o.g.); Zague 71'; Cantú 80' | Report |

Estadio Azteca, Mexico City
Attendance: 120,000
Referee: Robert Sawtell (Canada)

== Statistics ==
=== Goalscorers ===
There were 60 goals scored in 16 matches, for an average of 3.75 goals per match.

11 goals

- (Mexico) Zague

5 goals

- (Mexico) Luis Miguel Salvador

4 goals

- (Honduras) Eduardo Bennett

3 goals

- (Costa Rica) Juan Cayasso
- (Mexico) Octavio Mora

2 goals

- (Costa Rica) Roy Myers
- (Jamaica) Paul Davis
- (Jamaica) Devon Jarrett
- (Mexico) Ignacio Ambríz
- (Mexico) Jorge Rodríguez
- (United States) Eric Wynalda

1 goal

- (Canada) Geoff Aunger
- (Canada) Alex Bunbury
- (Canada) Nick Dasovic
- (Costa Rica) Floyd Guthrie
- (Honduras) Giovanni Gayle
- (Honduras) Alex Pineda Chacón
- (Jamaica) Walter Boyd
- (Jamaica) Hector Wright
- (Martinique) Thierry Fondelot
- (Martinique) Georges Gertrude
- (Martinique) Thierry Tinmar
- (Mexico) Guillermo Cantú
- (Mexico) Juan Hernández
- (Mexico) Ramón Ramírez
- (Panama) Jesús Julio
- (Panama) Víctor Mendieta
- (Panama) Percibal Piggott
- (United States) Thomas Dooley
- (United States) Cle Kooiman
- (United States) Alexi Lalas

1 own goal

- (Costa Rica) Javier Delgado (against Mexico)
- (United States) Desmond Armstrong (against Mexico)

== Awards ==
The following Gold Cup awards were given at the conclusion of the tournament: the Golden Boot (top scorer) and Golden Ball (best overall player).

Golden Ball
(Mexico) Ramón Ramírez
Golden Boot
(Mexico) Zague
11 goals
