= Alberto Coyote =

Mexican footballer and manager (born 1967)

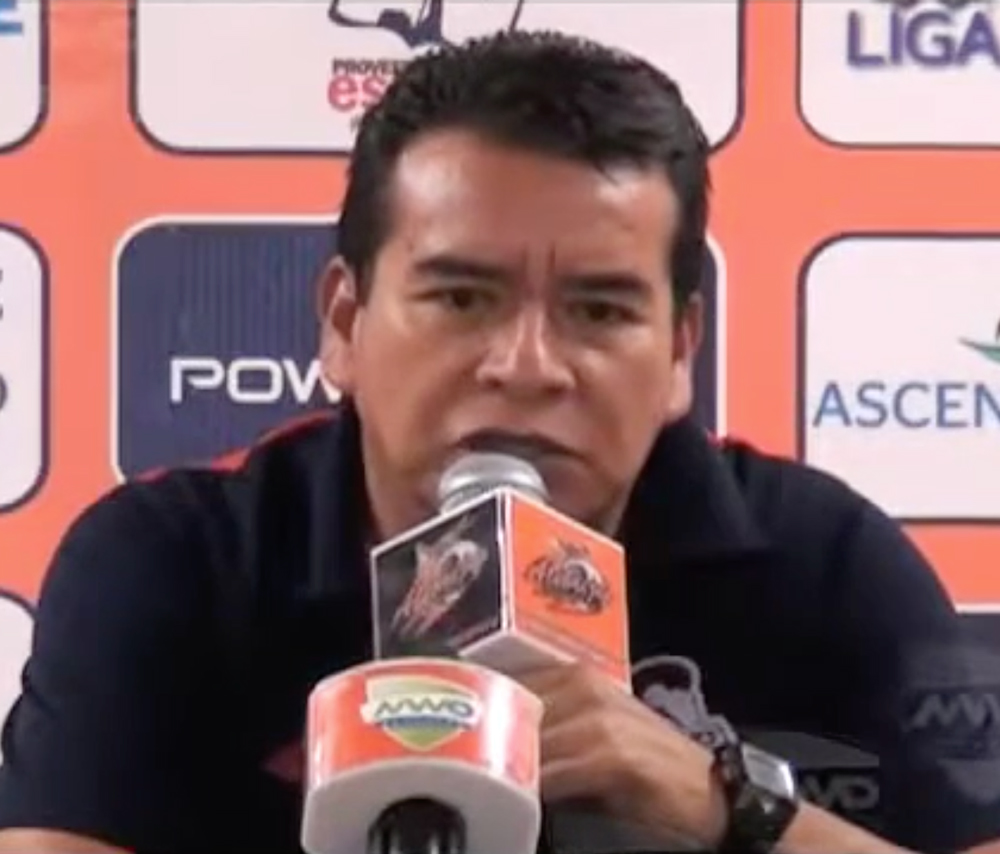
- Coyote in 2016

Personal information
- Full name: Héctor Alberto Coyote Tapia
- Date of birth: 26 March 1967 (age 59)
- Place of birth: Celaya, Guanajuato, Mexico
- Height: 1.67 m (5 ft 5 1/2 in)
- Position: Midfielder

Senior career*
Years	Team	Apps	(Gls)
1990–1993	León	58	(5)
1993–2001	Guadalajara	259	(9)
2001–2002	Atlante	30	(0)

International career
1992–2001	Mexico	54	(0)

Managerial career
- 2011: Oro
- 2011–2012: Guadalajara Reserves and Academy
- 2012–2013: San Luis (Assistant)
- 2013–2014: Unión de Curtidores
- 2014–2016: Querétaro Premier
- 2016: Querétaro (Assistant)
- 2016–2017: Cimarrones (Assistant)
- 2017–2018: Guadalajara Reserves and Academy
- 2019: Guadalajara (Assistant)
- 2019: Guadalajara (interim)
- 2019: Guadalajara Reserves and Academy
- 2019–2020: Guadalajara (Assistant)
- 2020–2021: Tapatío
- 2022: Guadalajara Reserves and Academy
- * Club domestic league appearances and goals

Héctor Alberto Coyote Tapia (born 26 March 1967) is a Mexican former professional footballer and current manager of Liga de Expansión MX club Tapatío.

As a player, he obtained 54 caps for the Mexico national team between 1992 and 2001, and was a squad member at the 1995 Copa América. He made his international debut on 26 July 1992.

== Club career ==
He began his career with León in 1990, quickly winning a place in the lineup and starting 42 matches as the club won the championship in the 1991–92 season. Coyote is most remembered for his eight years at C.D. Guadalajara, where he spent the prime seasons of his career. A hard-working defensive midfielder with an effective short passing touch, he played for five years alongside his more renowned club and international teammate Ramón Ramírez. This skillful central midfield duo helped Chivas to the Verano 1997 championship, after which Coyote was honored as the league's player of the season. After leaving Guadalajara in 2001, he ended his top-flight Mexican career with Atlante F.C. in 2002.

== International career ==
Although Coyote appeared in the 1993 CONCACAF Gold Cup and 1995 Copa América, his international career reached its height in 1996 and 1997, when Mexico was under the management of Bora Milutinovic. There, he formed an aging but clever midfield trio with Alberto García Aspe and Benjamín Galindo, while his club teammate Ramírez played at left back. Although he played in thirteen of Mexico's sixteen qualifiers, Coyote missed out on the 1998 FIFA World Cup after the appointment of Manuel Lapuente in late 1997. Coyote was one of four regular starters in the qualifiers, all of them aged 30 or above, to be dropped from the team upon Lapuente's appointment. He was recalled by Enrique Meza in 2000 and earned five more caps. Coyote's last international appearance came at the 2001 FIFA Confederations Cup tournament against Australia on 30 May 2001.

== Honours ==
León

- Mexican Primera División: 1991–92

Guadalajara

- Mexican Primera División: Verano 1997
