= Julio González (football manager) =

Uruguayan footballer and manager

Personal information
- Full name: Julio Cesar González Montemurro
- Date of birth: 1 December 1953 (age 72)
- Place of birth: Montevideo, Uruguay

Managerial career
- Years: Team
- 1989: Huracán Buceo
- 1990: Olimpia
- 1991: Atletico Basanez
- 1992–1993: C.D. Petrotela
- 1993: Honduras
- 1993–1996: Deportivo Victoria
- 1997–1998: Puebla FC
- 1999: Olimpia
- 2000: Olimpia
- 2001: Motagua
- 2002–2004: Coban Imperial
- 2004: Communications
- 2005–2008: Deportivo Jalapa
- 2008–2010: Communications
- 2013: Cucuta Deportivo

Julio Cesar González Montemurro (born 1 December 1953) is a Uruguayan football manager and former player.

He coached the Honduras national team at the 1993 CONCACAF Gold Cup.
