= Saúl Suárez =

Colombian former football manager (born c. 1952)

Personal information
- Place of birth: Colombia

Managerial career
- Years: Team
- 1988–90: San Francisco F.C.
- 1993: Panama
- 1998: Arabe Unido de Colón

Saúl Suárez (born Colombia 1952) was a Colombian former football manager.

He became the first coach to qualify the Panama national football team for the CONCACAF Gold Cup in 1993.
