= Thierry Tinmar =

Martiniquais football player and manager (born 1963)

Personal information
- Date of birth: 19 May 1963 (age 63)
- Place of birth: Le Lamentin, Martinique, France
- Height: 1.80 m (5 ft 11 in)
- Position: Centre-back

Youth career
- –1984: Paris Saint-Germain

Senior career*
Years	Team	Apps	(Gls)
1984–1985	Paris Saint-Germain	16	(0)
1985–1986	→ Laval (loan)	3	(0)
1986–1987	Red Star	25	(0)
1988–1989	Châteauroux		
1989–1993	Club Franciscain		

International career
1993	Martinique	4	(1)

Managerial career
- 2017: New Star de Ducos
- * Club domestic league appearances and goals

Thierry Tinmar (born 19 May 1963) is a Martiniquais former professional football player and manager. As a player, he was a centre-back. He notably played for Paris Saint-Germain, Laval, and Red Star in France and played for the Martinique national team.

== Club career ==
Originally from Martinique, Tinmar was a product of the Paris Saint-Germain Academy. Integrating the first team during the 1984–85 season, he made a total of 22 appearances in all competitions. PSG reached the Coupe de France final that season, but lost 1–0 to Monaco. He was loaned at fellow Division 1 club Laval at the end of the campaign.

After one season with Laval, Tinmar signed with Division 2 club Red Star. He would also stay there one only one season. For almost a year, Tinmar was a free agent. Then, in 1988, he signed for Division 3 side Châteauroux. His spell at the club lasted until 1989, as he then moved back to Martinique to play for Club Franciscain. Tinmar retired in 1993.

== International career ==
Having just won the 1993 Caribbean Cup with Martinique two months prior, Tinmar was included in the squad for the 1993 CONCACAF Gold Cup by manager Raymond Destin. He would go on to make three appearances in the tournament, playing in each of Martinique's three group stage games. Tinmar scored one goal for the team, an equalizer against Costa Rica in the final match. However, Martinique were eliminated, as they finished bottom of their group.

=== International goals ===
Martinique score listed first, score column indicates score after the Tinmar goal.

List of international goals scored by Virgill Najoe
No.	Cap	Date	Venue	Opponent	Score	Result	Competition	Ref.
1	3	18 July 1993	Estadio Azteca, Mexico City, Mexico	Costa Rica	1–1	3–1	1993 CONCACAF Gold Cup	

== Managerial career ==
Tinmar was the manager of New Star de Decos, a club in the Martinique Championnat National, from January to December 2017.

== Honours ==
Paris Saint-Germain

- Coupe de France runner-up: 1984–85

Martinique

- Caribbean Cup: 1993
