= Charles-Édouard Coridon =

Martiniquais footballer (born 1973)

Personal information
- Date of birth: 9 April 1973 (age 53)
- Place of birth: Le François, Martinique, France
- Position: Midfielder

Senior career*
Years	Team	Apps	(Gls)
1990–1993	Club Franciscain		
1993–1999	Guingamp	164	(13)
1999–2004	Lens	129	(13)
2004–2005	Paris Saint-Germain	19	(2)
2005–2006	Ankaragücü	17	(2)
2007–2008	Union Squiffiec-Trégonneau		
2008–2010	Esnafspor		

International career
- France U21
1993–2007	Martinique	6	(0)
- * Club domestic league appearances and goals

Charles-Édouard Coridon (born 9 April 1973) is a Martiniquais former professional footballer who played as a midfielder.

== Club career ==
Whilst at Guingamp, Coridon won the 1996 UEFA Intertoto Cup. At Paris Saint-Germain, he is best remembered for scoring a scorpion kick in the UEFA Champions League against Porto in 2004. The goal was fourth-placed in a countdown of the top Champions League goals of all time by ITV Sport.

== International career ==
Coridon represented the France U21 national team at the 1996 UEFA European Under-21 Championship, but he was reported to have turned down France on the senior level. He said that France had 'enough top-quality' players and he would not be needed. Coridon would go on to play for the Martinique national team at the 1993 and 2003 CONCACAF Gold Cup.

== Honours ==
Guingamp

- UEFA Intertoto Cup: 1996
