= Cálix Castro =

Costa Rican footballer and manager

Personal information
- Full name: Carlos Luis Castro
- Date of birth: circa 1963 (age 62–63)
- Position: Midfielder

Senior career*
Years	Team	Apps	(Gls)
- C.S. Herediano
- A.D. Carmelita
- A.D. Santa Bárbara

International career
1993	Costa Rica		

Managerial career
- 2002–2003: A.D. Belén
- * Club domestic league appearances and goals

Carlos Luis "Cálix" Castro is a former Costa Rican footballer and manager.

He played for Costa Rica in a friendly game against Panama on 23 June 1993. He later represented Costa Rica at the 1993 CONCACAF Gold Cup.

In 2002, he was appointed manager of A.D. Belén.
