= Juan Cayasso =

Costa Rican footballer (born 1961)

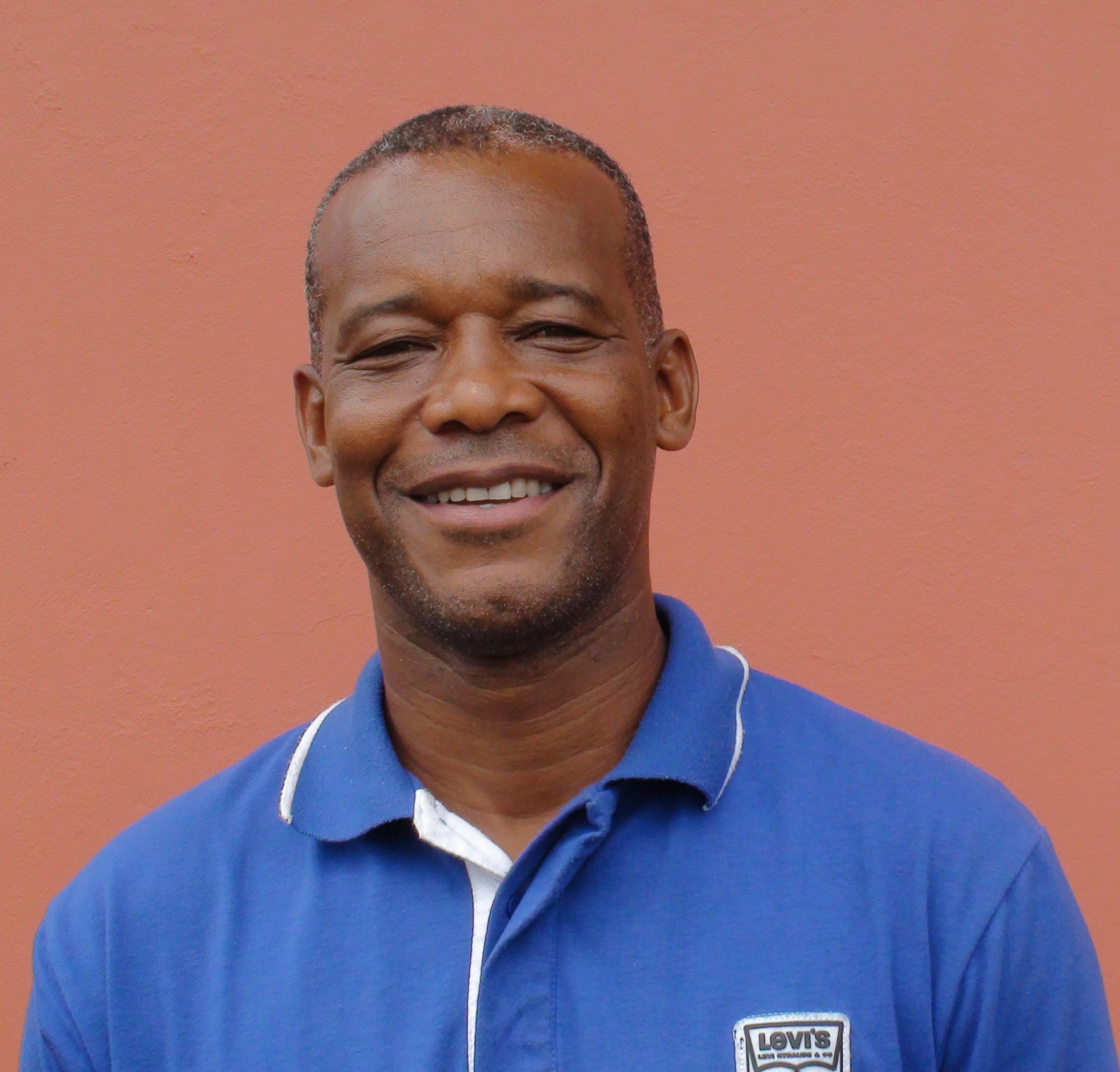
- Cayasso in 2009

Personal information
- Full name: Juan Arnoldo Cayasso Reid
- Date of birth: 24 June 1961 (age 65)
- Place of birth: Limón, Costa Rica
- Height: 1.76 m (5 ft 9 in)
- Positions: Attacking midfielder; striker

Senior career*
Years	Team	Apps	(Gls)
1981–1987	Alajuelense	225	(92)
1988–1990	Saprissa		
1990–1992	Stuttgarter Kickers	53	(19)
1992–1993	Carmelita		
1993–1995	Saprissa	104	(59)
1996	Turrialba	4	(1)
1996	Belén	2	(0)
1996–1997	Goicoechea	14	(1)
1997–2000	Carmelita	88	(41)
2000–2001	MC Oran	25	(18)
Total		515	(140)

International career
1983–1993	Costa Rica	49	(9)

Managerial career
- El Roble
- 2005: Limonense
- * Club domestic league appearances and goals

Juan Arnoldo Cayasso Reid (born 24 June 1961) is a Costa Rican former professional footballer who played during the 1980s and 1990s.

Cayasso is a major figure in the history of Costa Rican football, as he was a part of the team that participated in the 1990 FIFA World Cup, the country's maiden appearance at a FIFA World Cup. Their debut match saw Costa Rica defeating Scotland, as Cayasso scored the first Costa Rican goal at a FIFA World Cup. Moreover, he is also the first player from Costa Rica and Central America to play at the Bundesliga.

In 2014, the film Italia 90 was shot with actor Winston Washington featuring as Cayasso.

== Club career ==
Cayasso was born in Limón. He played for the two biggest teams in Costa Rica, starting out in Alajuelense in the early 1980s, and later switching to their arch-rivals Saprissa before the 1988 season. His transfer caused a lot of national attention because he was considered one of the most talented players in Costa Rica at the time. He made his debut for Alajuelense on 21 July 1981 against Ramonense and scored his first goal against Cartaginés on 11 April 1982. He played 225 matches for Alajuelense, scoring 62 goals. He played 104 games in total for Saprissa, scoring 27 goals.

Cayasso won several national championships, both with Saprissa and Alajuela, as well as a two CONCACAF Champions Cup titles, with Alajuelense in 1986 and with Saprissa in 1995. During the early 1990s, Cayasso played in the Bundesliga with Stuttgarter Kickers, and later returned to Saprissa, where helped his team win several titles more. In January 1996 he moved to Turrialba after finding it hard to receive playing time at Saprissa and in November 1996, Cayasso joined Goicoechea.

He scored his 100th league goal on 18 March 1998 for Carmelita but was released by them in March 2000. He was given a testimonial match in November 2000.

== International career ==
Nicknamed el Nene (the Kid), he made his debut for Costa Rica in 1983 and has earned a total of 49 caps, scoring 9 goals. He has represented his country in 10 FIFA World Cup qualification matches and is mostly remembered for scoring the first Costa Rican goal ever in a World Cup, against Scotland during the 1990 World Cup finals played in Italy. That game was won by the Ticos, against all predictions.

His final international was a July 1993 CONCACAF Gold Cup match against Jamaica. He also played at the 1984 Olympic Games held in Los Angeles.

=== International goals ===
Scores and results list Costa Rica's goal tally first, score column indicates score after each Cayasso goal.

List of international goals scored by Juan Cayasso
No.	Date	Venue	Opponent	Score	Result	Competition
1	31 July 1988	Estadio Rommel Fernández, Panama City, Panama	Panama	1–0	2–0	1990 FIFA World Cup qualification
2	11 June 1989	Estadio Ricardo Saprissa Aymá, San José, Costa Rica	Trinidad and Tobago	1–0	1–0	1990 FIFA World Cup qualification
3	25 June 1989	Estadio Cuscatlán, San Salvador, El Salvador	El Salvador	1–0	4–2	1990 FIFA World Cup qualification
4	2 February 1990	Orange Bowl, Miami, United States	United States	1–0	2–0	Marlboro Cup
5	22 February 1990	Memorial Coliseum, Los Angeles, United States	Soviet Union	1–0	1–2	Marlboro Cup
6	11 June 1990	Stadio Luigi Ferraris, Genoa, Italy	Scotland	1–0	1–0	1990 FIFA World Cup
7	15 July 1993	Estadio Azteca, Mexico City, Mexico	Mexico	1–0	1–1	1993 CONCACAF Gold Cup
8	18 July 1993	Estadio Azteca, Mexico City, Mexico	Martinique	2–1	3–1	1993 CONCACAF Gold Cup
9	18 July 1993	Estadio Azteca, Mexico City, Mexico	Martinique	3–1	3–1	1993 CONCACAF Gold Cup

== Managerial career ==
After coaching second division side El Roble, Cayasso took the reins at Limonense in January 2005, working for free since his hometown club was heavily in debt. Later he became sports director and administrator at Limonense. From 2012 he is a member of the Sports Committee of the canton Limón.

== Personal life ==
He is one of nine children of Arnoldo Cayasso Joseph and Muriel Reid Carr. He married Marta Zamora in 1988 and had two children, José and Naomi Cayasso. José Cayasso is Slidebean's founder and CEO. He later divorced, remarried, and had another son, Juan Gabriel Cayasso.
