= Bora Milutinović =

Serbian footballer and manager (born 1944)

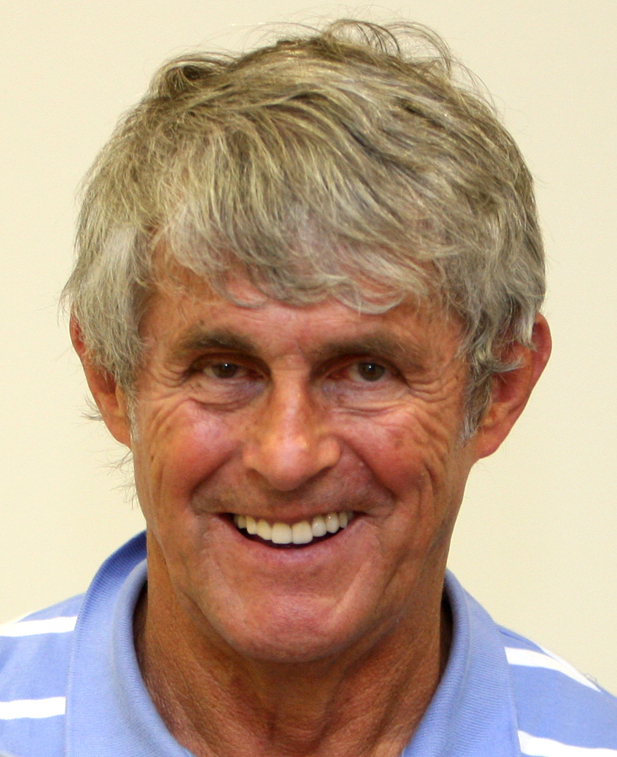
- Milutinović in 2012

Personal information
- Full name: Velibor Milutinović
- Date of birth: 7 September 1944 (age 82)
- Place of birth: Bajina Bašta, German-occupied Serbia
- Height: 1.77 m (5 ft 9 1/2 in)
- Position: Midfielder

Youth career
- Bor

Senior career*
Years	Team	Apps	(Gls)
1958–1960	OFK Beograd	15	(3)
1960–1965	Partizan	44	(5)
1966	OFK Beograd	13	(3)
1966–1967	Winterthur	25	(3)
1967–1969	Monaco	42	(3)
1969–1971	Nice	37	(0)
1971	Partizan	0	(0)
1972	Rouen	10	(0)
1972–1976	UNAM	93	(12)
Total		279	(29)

Managerial career
- 1977–1983: UNAM
- 1983–1986: Mexico
- 1987: San Lorenzo
- 1987: Udinese
- 1988: Veracruz
- 1988–1989: Tecos UAG
- 1990: Costa Rica
- 1991–1995: United States
- 1995–1997: Mexico
- 1997–1998: Nigeria
- 1998–1999: MetroStars
- 2000–2002: China
- 2003–2004: Honduras
- 2004–2005: Al Sadd
- 2006–2007: Jamaica
- 2009: Iraq
- 2014: China (advisor)
Medal record
Men's football
Representing Yugoslavia (as player)
Mediterranean Games
Winner	1971 Mediterranean Games	Team
Representing Mexico (as manager)
CONCACAF Gold Cup
Winner	1996 United States	Team
Copa América
Third place	1997 Bolivia	Team
Representing United States (as manager)
CONCACAF Gold Cup
Winner	1991 United States	Team
Runner-up	1993 United States-Mexico	Team
FIFA Confederations Cup
Third place	1992 Saudi Arabia	Team
- * Club domestic league appearances and goals

Velibor "Bora" Milutinović (Serbian Cyrillic: Велибор Бора Милутиновић; born 7 September 1944) is a Serbian former professional footballer and manager.

He has managed at five editions of the FIFA World Cup, tied for the record alongside Brazilian manager Carlos Alberto Parreira and Portuguese manager Carlos Queiroz, but did so in five consecutive World Cups with different teams: Mexico (1986), Costa Rica (1990), the United States (1994), Nigeria (1998) and China (2002), qualifying for 1986 and 1994 as the host nation. He is also the first manager to take four teams beyond the first round – all but China – earning the nickname of Miracle Worker, first given to him by Alan Rothenberg, then president of the United States Soccer Federation. In total, Milutinović has managed eight national football teams for a total of 273 games – the most by any national team manager in history.

== Managing career ==
=== World Cup national teams ===
==== Mexico (1983–86) ====
Milutinović led Mexico to the quarter-finals at the 1986 FIFA World Cup, its highest finish. Mexico fell in the quarter-finals to West Germany on penalty kicks.

==== Costa Rica (1990) ====
Milutinović took over Costa Rica just before the 1990 FIFA World Cup and got Costa Rica into the second round. In 1990, Milutinović was hired as head coach of Costa Rica just 90 days before the World Cup. He cut the captain and other starters. Costa Rica managed to beat Scotland and Sweden and lost to Brazil, 1–0, before losing 4–1 to Czechoslovakia in the second round.

==== United States (1991–95) ====
Hank Steinbrecher, general secretary of the U.S. Soccer Federation (USSF), conducted the job interviews for the U.S. national team head coach position. American coaches had not proved their worth on the international stage, as the United States had lost all three games in the 1990 World Cup finals under Bob Gansler. When the USSF's search began in 1991, the emphasis was not so much on experience, but on finding a coach who could squeeze the last drop of potential out of a lightly regarded team, and Milutinović's name came up again and again. He had coached first Mexico, then Costa Rica to surprising World Cup success.

Milutinović left no doubt about who ran the team, cutting two U.S. players, Peter Vermes and Desmond Armstrong, board members of the national federation, from his World Cup team. Milutinović further cut Bruce Murray, the all-time leading U.S. goal scorer. When Alexi Lalas first showed up at training camp, Milutinović told him to get a haircut or get off the team.

Milutinović coached the U.S. national team at the 1994 FIFA World Cup, hosted in the United States, where the team notched its first win in the World Cup since 1950 and progressed to the knockout round of the tournament for the first time since the 1930s. This was hailed as a success for a country with little soccer experience. Bora’s name was used for the 1994 World Cup set manufactured by the Upper Deck Company.

The USSF fired Milutinović on 14 April 1995, saying it wanted someone who could be both coach and administrator. Milutinović reportedly wanted no part of the administrative duties.

==== Nigeria (1997–98) ====
Milutinović coached the Nigerian team at the 1998 FIFA World Cup in France. Nigeria won its group, notching a notable 3–2 upset win over Spain, and reached the knockout rounds. This was the fourth team that Milutinović had taken to the knockout rounds of the World Cup, a coaching record.

==== China (2000–02) ====
Under Milutinović's coaching, for the first time ever, the China national team qualified to be among the 32 finalists for the World Cup in 2002 FIFA World Cup held in South Korea and Japan. He was hailed as a hero in China, ending a 44-year drought, and was popularly known as Milu. However, China would lose all three of their matches and failed to score a single goal. Milutinović would resign after the tournament.

=== Other national teams ===
==== Honduras (2003–04) ====
In the summer of 2003, Milutinović was in serious negotiations to finally take over the national team at his native Serbia. Despite heavy, month-long persuasion from Serbian football officials, Milutinović turned down the offer and soon signed on to the Honduras national team. He led the team to the first round of CONCACAF qualifiers before resigning on 30 June 2004. He cited "the prevailing bad atmosphere, created by comments made by the country's managers, officials and press" as the reason for his leaving during World Cup qualifying.

==== Jamaica (2006–07) ====
On 16 November 2006, Milutinović was announced as head coach of Jamaica. On 9 November 2007, following a string of six consecutive friendly defeats, he was fired by the Jamaican FA.

==== Iraq (2009) ====
Milutinović led the Iraq national football team in group play in the 2009 FIFA Confederations Cup for two draws and one loss, failing to reach the knockout stage.

=== Club teams ===
Milutinović's managerial career at club level has seen more mixed success. His longest managerial spell for a single club was his tenure with UNAM of Mexico from 1977 to 1983. Several of his Pumas players ended up playing for Mexico at the 1986 World Cup.

Since then, he has managed briefly for several club teams. He managed Udinese of the Italian Serie B for nine matches in 1987. He then managed the MetroStars of Major League Soccer to the worst record in league history in 1999. He also had a brief stint in the Qatar Stars League with Al-Sadd in the 2004–05 season.

== Managerial statistics ==
As of 12 May 2026

Managerial record by team and tenure
Team	Nat.	From	To	Record								Ref
Team	Nat.	From	To	G	W	D	L	GF	GA	GD	Win %	Ref
UNAM	(Mexico)	1977	1983	218	96	59	63	406	299	+107	44.04	
Mexico	(Mexico)	1983	1986	46	24	15	7	66	39	+27	52.17	
San Lorenzo	(Argentina)	1987	1987	8	4	4	0	8	2	+6	50.00	
Udinese	(Italy)	1987	1987	9	3	0	6	6	10	−4	33.33	
Costa Rica	(Costa Rica)	1990	1991	9	3	0	6	7	13	−6	33.33	
United States	(United States)	1991	1995	96	30	31	35	116	110	+6	31.25	
Mexico	(Mexico)	1995	1997	49	26	15	8	91	54	+37	53.06	
Nigeria	(Nigeria)	1997	1998	11	3	2	6	10	22	−12	27.27	
NY/NJ MetroStars	(United States)	1998	1999	33	5	3	25	34	65	−31	15.15	
China	(China)	2000	2002	46	20	11	15	75	50	+25	43.48	
Honduras	(Honduras)	2003	2004	10	2	4	4	12	14	−2	20.00	
Al-Sadd	(Qatar)	2004	2005	39	13	9	17	49	53	−4	33.33	
Jamaica	(Jamaica)	2006	2007	6	1	1	4	5	15	−10	16.67	
Iraq	(Iraq)	2009	2009	4	0	3	1	1	2	−1	0.00	
Career total				584	230	157	197	874	734	+140	39.38	—

=== Managerial statistics ===
Year(s)	Nat	Team (Note: Includes national teams.)	G	W	D	L	Win %	GF	GA	Ref(s)
1977–1983	(Mexico)	UNAM	218	96	59	63	44	406	299	
1983-1986, 1995-1997	(Mexico)	Mexico	104	52	32	20	50	172	101	
1987	(Argentina)	San Lorenzo	8	4	4	0	50.0	8	2	
1987	(Italy)	Udinese	9	3	0	6	33.3	6	10	
1988	(Mexico)	Veracruz								
1988–1989	(Mexico)	Tecos UAG								
1990–1991	(Costa Rica)	Costa Rica	9	3	0	6	33.3	7	13	
1991–1995	(United States)	United States	96	30	31	35	31.3	116	110	
1997–1998	(Nigeria)	Nigeria	11	3	2	6	27.3	10	22	
1998–1999	(United States)	NY/NJ MetroStars	33	5	3	25	15.2			
2000–2002	(China)	China	46	20	11	15	43.5	75	50	
2003–2004	(Honduras)	Honduras	10	2	4	4	20.0	12	14	
2004–2005	(Qatar)	Al-Sadd								
2006–2007	(Jamaica)	Jamaica	6	1	1	4	16.7	5	15	
2009	(Iraq)	Iraq	4 (Note: Qatar vs. Iraq not considered as a FIFA International match since Iraq made 13 substitutions; Iraq lost the match 0–1.)	0	3	1	0.0	1	2	

== Personal life ==
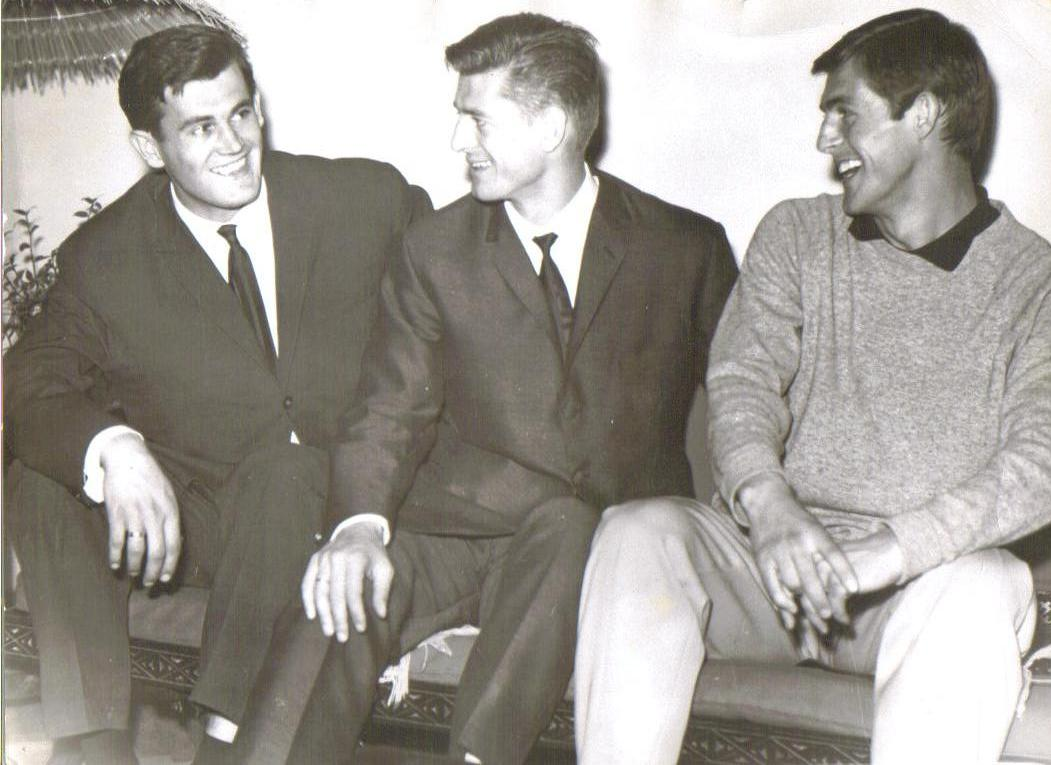
The Milutinović brothers (left to right): Milorad, Miloš and Bora

Milutinović comes from a footballing family; he and his two brothers Miloš and Milorad played together for Partizan.

His father was killed in World War II, his mother by tuberculosis soon after the war. He said he does not remember either of his parents. He was raised by an aunt, and raised playing football.

Milutinović married María del Carmen Méndez Kara of Mexico in 1986 and currently resides in Qatar. Aside from his native Serbo-Croatian, he is fluent in English, Spanish, Italian and French.

== Honours ==
=== Player ===
UNAM

- Copa MX: 1974–75
- Campeón de Campeones: 1975

=== Manager ===
UNAM

- Liga MX: 1980–81
- CONCACAF Champions' Cup: 1980, 1982
- Copa Interamericana: 1981

United States

- Gold Cup: 1991
- Gold Cup: runner-up 1993

Mexico

- Gold Cup: 1996

== See also ==
- National team managers with 100 or more matches
