= José Antonio Noriega =

Mexican footballer (born 1969)

Personal information
- Full name: José Antonio Noriega
- Date of birth: December 29, 1969 (age 56)
- Place of birth: Mexico City, Mexico
- Height: 1.77 m (5 ft 9 1/2 in)
- Position: Midfielder

Senior career*
Years	Team	Apps	(Gls)
1988–1992	UNAM	16	(0)
1992–1996	Monterrey	137	(22)
1997	Cruz Azul	17	(1)
1997–1999	Santos Laguna	70	(13)
1999–2000	UANL	27	(0)
2000–2002	Morelia	105	(15)
2003–2004	Santos Laguna	50	(3)
2004	Morelia	13	(0)

International career
1993–2002	Mexico	6	(0)
Medal record
Men's football
Representing Mexico
Pan American Games
Silver medal – second place	1991 Havana	Team
- * Club domestic league appearances and goals

José Antonio Noriega (born 29 December 1969) is a Mexican former professional footballer who played 14 years for various clubs in the Primera División de México. Noriega played with seven different clubs in Mexico, his most years coming with Monterrey. Noriega played for the Mexico national team in six occasions. He currently serves as Sporting Chairman of Liga MX club Monterrey. He is commonly known by his nickname, Tato.

== Club career ==
Noriega started his career with UNAM where he playing sparingly in two seasons. He was transferred to Monterrey after the 1992–93 season, Noriega went on to play for the next four years with Monterrey. He was transferred to Cruz Azul for the Verano 1997 season, where he played 17 matches and scored only one goal. After only one tournament with Cruz Azul, Noriega played the following two years with Santos Laguna. After his stint with Santos, Noriega spent 1999–2000 with Tigres de la UANL, Noriega will play 27 matches but did not score any goals. He was then transferred to Morelia where he had his most success than with any other club. He won the Invierno 2000 championship, and was runner-up in the Apertura 2002, as well as runner-up in the 2002 CONCACAF Champions' Cup. He also was one of the top scorers of the 2002 Copa Libertadores where he helped Morelia advance to the quarterfinals. In 2003, he went with a second stint with Santos Laguna where he played three tournaments. For the Apertura 2004 he went for a second stint with Morelia, where he played in 13 matches, Noriega retired after the Apertura 2004.

== International career ==
Noriega made his international debut on June 29, 1993, in a friendly against Costa Rica, Noriega played all 90 minutes. Noriega went on to play two more matches in 1993, 1996 played one, and 2002 played two. Noriega was also part of the 2002 CONCACAF Gold Cup roster, which he was also the team captain during the tournament. Noriega was controversially left out of the 2002 FIFA World Cup roster by Javier Aguirre despite being one of the top scorers in the 2002 Copa Libertadores.

== Media career ==
José Antonio Noriega worked as a Spanish-language football commentator for ESPN Deportes and ESPN Internacional. Noriega used his extensive knowledge of football to provide depth to his work as a commentator for the company's various platforms and as an analyst for the network's international football program.

== Honours ==
Morelia

- Primera División de México: Invierno 2000

Mexico

- CONCACAF Gold Cup: 1993
