= Juan Carlos Chávez =

Mexican footballer (born 1967)

Personal information
- Full name: Juan Carlos Chávez Zárate
- Date of birth: 18 January 1967 (age 59)
- Place of birth: Zamora, Mexico
- Height: 1.78 m (5 ft 10 in)
- Position: Midfielder

Senior career*
| Years | Team | Apps | (Gls) |
| 1988–1991 | Atlas | 40 | (2) |
| 1991–1992 | Puebla | 36 | (4) |
| 1992–1996 | Atlas | 84 | (8) |
| 1996–1997 | Morelia | 21 | (3) |
| 1997–1998 | Atlas | 27 | (0) |
| 1998–1999 | Pachuca | 12 | (0) |
| Total | | 220 | (17) |

International career
| 1993–1994 | Mexico | 3 | (0) |

Managerial career
- 2009–2011: Mexico U20
- 2011–2012: Atlas
- 2014–2015: Venados F.C.
- 2016–2018: Cimarrones de Sonora
- 2018–2019: Correcaminos UAT
- 2019–: Atlético San Luis (Assistant)
Medal record
Men's football
Representing Mexico (as manager)
FIFA U-20 World Cup
| Bronze medal – third place | 2011 |
- * Club domestic league appearances and goals

Juan Carlos Chávez Zárate (Note: In this Spanish name, the first or paternal surname is Chávez and the second or maternal family name is Zárate.) (born 18 January 1967) is a Mexican former footballer who played at both professional and international levels as a midfielder.

== Career ==
Born in Zamora, Michoacán, Chávez played club football for Atlas, Puebla, Monarcas Morelia and Pachuca.

Chávez also earned three caps for the Mexico national team, representing them at the 1994 FIFA World Cup.

After he retired from playing, Chávez became a football coach. He led the Mexico national under-20 football team at the 2011 FIFA U-20 World Cup finals in Colombia, and was appointed manager of Club Atlas in September 2011.
