= Erick Rodríguez (footballer) =

Costa Rican footballer (born 1968)

Personal information
- Full name: Erick Rodríguez Ayara
- Date of birth: December 8, 1968 (age 57)
- Place of birth: Costa Rica
- Position: Midfielder

Senior career*
Years	Team	Apps	(Gls)
1988–1989	C.S. Uruguay de Coronado		
1993–1996	CS Cartaginés		
1996–1999	Municipal Goicoechea		

International career
	Costa Rica	4	(0)
- * Club domestic league appearances and goals

Erick Rodríguez Ayara (born 8 December 1968) is a retired Costa Rican professional footballer who plays as a midfielder. He is the father of Ariel Rodríguez, also a professional footballer.
