= Ricardo Cadena =

Mexican footballer (born 1969)

Personal information
- Full name: Ricardo Cadena Martínez
- Date of birth: 23 October 1969 (age 57)
- Place of birth: Guadalajara, Jalisco, Mexico
- Height: 1.75 m (5 ft 9 in)
- Position: Centre-back

Senior career*
| Years | Team | Apps | (Gls) |
| 1989–1993 | Guadalajara | 69 | (0) |
| 1993–2000 | León | 186 | (3) |
| 2000–2002 | La Piedad | 73 | (0) |
| 2002–2003 | Jaguares | 32 | (0) |
| 2003–2004 | Dorados | 39 | (0) |
| 2005 | Lagartos de Tabasco | 11 | (0) |
| 2005 | Tijuana | 18 | (0) |
| Total | | 428 | (3) |

International career
| 1993 | Mexico | 1 | (0) |

Managerial career
- 2006–2008: Salamanca (assistant)
- 2008–2009: Irapuato (assistant)
- 2008–2009: Unión de Curtidores (assistant)
- 2008–2009: Irapuato (assistant)
- 2009–2011: Dorados (assistant)
- 2011–2014: Necaxa (assistant)
- 2014–2015: Correcaminos UAT (assistant)
- 2016–2017: Mineros de Zacatecas (assistant)
- 2017–2018: Correcaminos UAT (assistant)
- 2018: Alebrijes de Oaxaca (assistant)
- 2019: Guadalajara Premier
- 2019–2020: Guadalajara (academy)
- 2020–2021: Guadalajara (assistant)
- 2021: Tapatío (Interim)
- 2022: Tapatío
- 2022: Guadalajara (Interim)
- 2022: Guadalajara
- 2023–2024: Mexico U23
- 2025: Mazatlán (assistant)
Medal record
Men's football
Representing Mexico (as a player)
Pan American Games
| Silver medal – second place | 1991 Havana | Team |
Representing Mexico (as manager)
Pan American Games
| Bronze medal – third place | 2023 Santiago | Team |
- * Club domestic league appearances and goals

Ricardo Cadena Martínez (born 23 October 1969) is a Mexican former professional footballer and current head coach of the Mexico under-23 national team.

He played as a defender during his career. He was a member of the Mexico national team competing at the 1992 Summer Olympics in Barcelona, Spain, and earned one cap for the senior side.

== Managerial statistics ==
Statistics accurate as of match played 9 September 2024

| Team | From | To | Record | | | | |
| Team | From | To | P | W | D | L | Win % |
|---|---|---|---|---|---|---|---|
| Tapatío | 23 September 2021 | 14 April 2022 | 30 | 10 | 9 | 11 | 33.33 |
| Guadalajara | 14 April 2022 | 16 October 2022 | 25 | 10 | 9 | 6 | 40.00 |
| Mexico U23 | 3 September 2023 | Present | 13 | 6 | 3 | 4 | 46.15 |
| Total | | | 68 | 26 | 21 | 21 | 38.24 |

== Honours ==
=== Manager ===
Mexico U23

- Pan American Bronze Medal: 2023
