= Jorge Rodríguez (footballer, born 1968) =

Mexican footballer (1968–2024)

Personal information
- Full name: Jorge Rodríguez Esquivel
- Date of birth: 18 April 1968
- Place of birth: Toluca, Mexico
- Date of death: 8 August 2024 (aged 56)
- Position: Midfielder

Senior career*
Years	Team	Apps	(Gls)
1988–1995	Toluca	201	(40)
1995–1997	Santos Laguna	60	(3)
Total		261	(43)

International career
1991–1996	Mexico	40	(3)
Medal record
Men's football
Representing Mexico
CONCACAF Gold Cup
Gold medal – first place	1993 Mexico/USA	Team
FIFA Confederations Cup
Bronze medal – third place	1995 Saudi Arabia	Team
- * Club domestic league appearances and goals

Jorge Rodríguez Esquivel (18 April 1968 – 8 August 2024) was a Mexican professional footballer who played for Toluca and Santos Laguna as a midfielder. He also represented Mexico at the 1994 FIFA World Cup.

After suffering for many years from Evans syndrome, he died on 8 August 2024, aged 56.
