= Javier Delgado (Costa Rican footballer) =

Costa Rican footballer (born 1968)

Personal information
- Full name: Luis Javier Delgado Prado
- Date of birth: 28 July 1968 (age 58)
- Place of birth: Alajuela, Costa Rica
- Height: 1.78 m (5 ft 10 in)
- Position: Defender

Team information
- Current team: Liga Deportiva Alajuelense (Sports Manager)

Youth career
- Alajuelense

Senior career*
Years	Team	Apps	(Gls)
1990–1997	Alajuelense	194	(11)
1997–1998	Municipal		
1998–1999	Santa Bárbara	39	(8)
1999–2003	Alajuelense	95	(14)

International career
1992–2000	Costa Rica	33	(2)

Managerial career
- 2003–2006: Alajuelense
- 2006–2008: Herediano
- 2008: Puntarenas
- 2009–2010: Ramonense
- 2011–2012: Municipal
- 2012–2013: Cartaginés
- 2014–2015: Real España
- 2015-2016: Alajuelense
- 2017: Cartaginés
- 2018-2019: Alajuelense (Sporting general)
- 2019-2020: La U Universitarios (Sporting general)
- 2020: AD San Carlos (Assistant coach)
- * Club domestic league appearances and goals

Javier Delgado Prado (born 28 July 1968) is a Costa Rican former professional football player and coach.

== Club career ==
Delgado spent the majority of his career at hometown club Alajuelense, but had a spell abroad at Guatemalan side Municipal and a season at Santa Bárbara.

== International career ==
Delgado made 33 appearances for the Costa Rica national football team, including qualifying matches for the 1998 FIFA World Cup.

== Managerial career ==
He started his managerial career with his beloved Liga in 2003, but they released him in February 2006 citing insufficient results. In December 2006, Delgado took the reins at Herediano but was sacked by them in March 2008. Delgado then took charge of Puntarenas in May 2008, four weeks after leaving Herediano, but left the club in October 2008 citing personal reasons. He joined Ramonense in September 2009 and later moved abroad to his former club Municipal, who dismissed him in September 2012.

In November 2012 he was appointed by Cartaginés, leaving them in March 2013 and in August 2014, Delgado replaced Hernán Medford as manager of Honduran side Real España.
