= Durrant Brown =

Jamaican footballer (born 1964)

Personal information
- Full name: Durrant Brown
- Date of birth: 8 July 1964 (age 62)
- Place of birth: Montego Bay, Jamaica
- Height: 1.71 m (5 ft 7 in)
- Position: Defender

Youth career
- St. James

Senior career*
Years	Team	Apps	(Gls)
1983–2004	Wadadah F.C.		(2)

International career
1992–1998	Jamaica	102	(0)
- * Club domestic league appearances and goals

Durrant Brown (born 8 July 1964) is a retired Jamaican football player.

The defender played his entire career for Wadadah F.C. He was nicknamed "Tatty". He played as a central defender despite being only 1.71m.

He played 102 times for the Jamaica national football team and was a participant at the 1998 FIFA World Cup.

== Honours ==
- Jamaica National Premier League: 2

1988, 1992

- Caribbean Cup: 1

1991

== See also ==
- List of men's footballers with 100 or more international caps
