= Luís Roberto Alves =

Mexican footballer (born 1967)

Luis Roberto Alves dos Santos
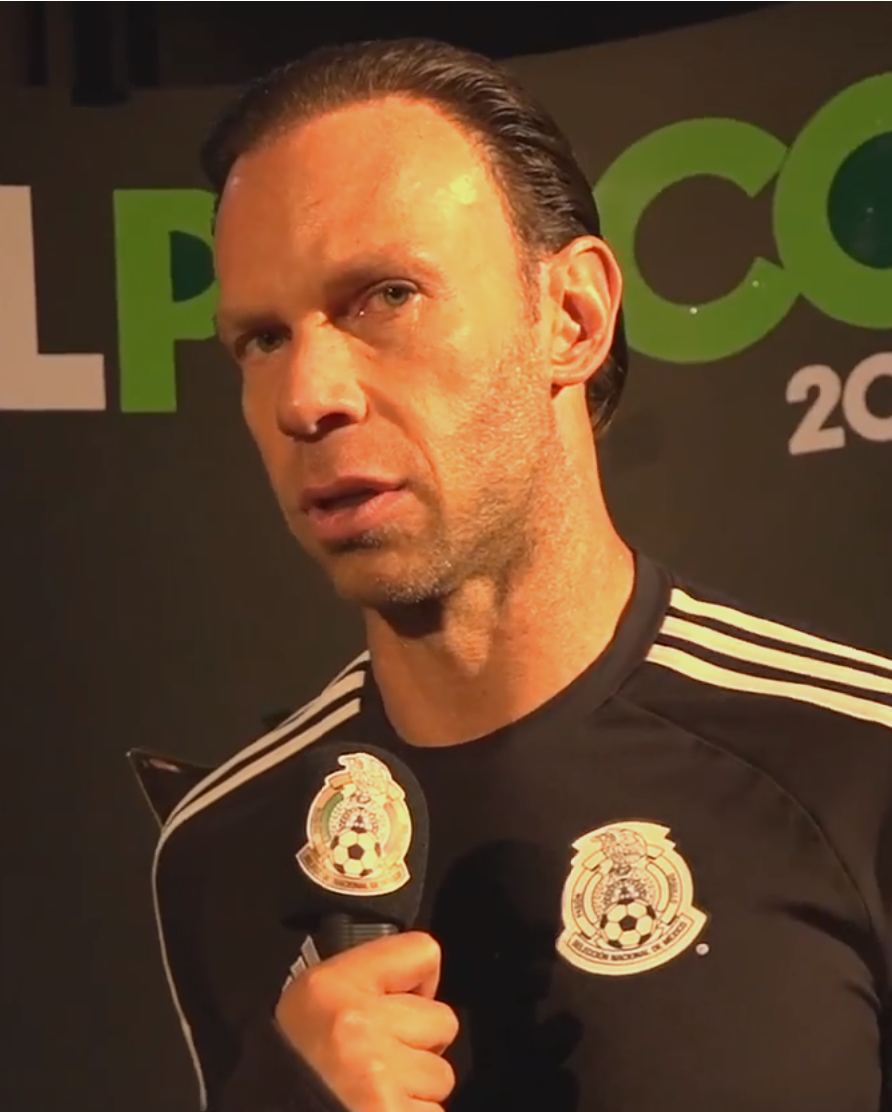
- Alves dos Santos in 2017

Personal information
- Full name: Luis Roberto Alves dos Santos Gavranić
- Date of birth: 23 May 1967 (age 59)
- Place of birth: Mexico City, Mexico
- Height: 1.93 m (6 ft 4 in)
- Position: Forward

Youth career
- 1983–1985: Corinthians

Senior career*
Years	Team	Apps	(Gls)
1985–1996	América	373	(157)
1996–1997	Atlante	30	(17)
1997–1998	América	35	(5)
1998–1999	Atlante	42	(7)
2000–2003	Necaxa	104	(23)
Total		584	(209)

International career
1988–2001	Mexico	83	(23)
Medal record
Representing Mexico
Runner-up	Copa América	1993
- * Club domestic league appearances and goals

Luis Roberto Alves dos Santos Gavranić (born 23 May 1967) is a Mexican former professional footballer who played as a forward. He is best known as Zague, in honor to his father.

Zague's legacy is most closely associated with Club América, where he made his professional debut and went on to win seven official titles. He remains the club's all-time leading scorer and ranks among the top ten all-time goalscorers in Mexico's top division.

On the international stage, Zague made 83 appearances and scored 23 goals. He represented Mexico at the FIFA World Cup in 1994.

== Career ==
Born in Mexico, his father José Alves dos Santos was a Brazilian forward who played for Club América and his mother was a Croatian housewife. Zague spent his childhood in Brazil (where he was referred to as Zaguinho, Zague with the diminutive suffix "-inho" appended to signify him being his father's son) beginning his youth football career with Corinthians. He returned to Mexico in 1985 and made his debut with the Mexican Club América a year later.

On 2 October 2003, his testimonial game was celebrated at the Estadio Azteca where America would defeat FC Barcelona 2–0.

He was a physically strong and fast striker who was regarded as the best in his prime years for both América and Mexico. He was Hugo Sánchez's offense partner in the Mexican side who finished as runner-up in Copa América 1993, where he finished up as Mexico's top goalscorer of the tournament.

He was part of the Mexico squad for the 1993 CONCACAF Gold Cup in which Mexico won the trophy and was the tournament top scorer with 11 goals which is still a CONCACAF record. Seven of those goals were scored against Martinique in a single game.

He scored 23 goals in 83 caps for his country.

Since 2018, Zague is an analyst for TV Azteca, alongside Luis García and Jorge Campos.

== Career statistics ==
=== International ===
Appearances and goals by national team and year
National team	Year	Apps	Goals
Mexico	1988	3	2
Mexico	1989	1	1
Mexico	1990	4	1
Mexico	1991	9	3
Mexico	1992	9	2
Mexico	1993	21	14
Mexico	1994	6	0
Mexico	1995	9	0
Mexico	1996	4	3
Mexico	1997	14	3
Mexico	2001	4	1
Total		84	30

Scores and results list Mexico's goal tally first, score column indicates score after each Zague goal.

List of international goals scored by Zague
No.	Date	Venue	Opponent	Score	Result	Competition	Ref.
1	29 March 1988	Estadio Azulgrana, Mexico City, Mexico	El Salvador	2–0	8–0	Friendly	
2	29 March 1988	Estadio Azulgrana, Mexico City, Mexico	El Salvador	4–0	8–0	Friendly	
3	14 February 1989	Estadio Cuauhtémoc, Puebla, Mexico	Poland	1–0	3–1	Friendly	
4	17 January 1990	Los Angeles Memorial Coliseum, Los Angeles, United States	Argentina	2–0	2–0	Friendly	
5	14 March 1991	Los Angeles Memorial Coliseum, Los Angeles, United States	Canada	1–0	3–0	Friendly	
6	14 March 1991	Los Angeles Memorial Coliseum, Los Angeles, United States	Canada	2–0	3–0	Friendly	
7	28 June 1991	Los Angeles Memorial Coliseum, Los Angeles, United States	Jamaica	2–0	4–1	1991 CONCACAF Gold Cup	
8	8 November 1992	Arnos Vale Stadium, Arnos Vale, Saint Vincent and the Grenadines	Saint Vincent and the Grenadines	1–0	4–0	1994 FIFA World Cup qualification	
9	6 December 1992	Estadio Azteca, Mexico City, Mexico	Saint Vincent and the Grenadines	6–0	11–0	1994 FIFA World Cup qualification	
10	10 June 1993	Estadio Azteca, Mexico City, Mexico	Paraguay	3–0	3–1	Friendly	
11	16 June 1993	Estadio 9 de Mayo, Machala, Ecuador	Colombia	1–1	1–2	1993 Copa América	
12	27 June 1993	Estadio Olímpico Atahualpa, Quito, Ecuador	Peru	2–0	4–2	1993 Copa América	
13	11 July 1993	Estadio Azteca, Mexico City, Mexico	Martinique	1–0	9–0	1993 CONCACAF Gold Cup	
14	11 July 1993	Estadio Azteca, Mexico City, Mexico	Martinique	2–0	9–0	1993 CONCACAF Gold Cup	
15	11 July 1993	Estadio Azteca, Mexico City, Mexico	Martinique	3–0	9–0	1993 CONCACAF Gold Cup	
16	11 July 1993	Estadio Azteca, Mexico City, Mexico	Martinique	5–0	9–0	1993 CONCACAF Gold Cup	
17	11 July 1993	Estadio Azteca, Mexico City, Mexico	Martinique	6–0	9–0	1993 CONCACAF Gold Cup	
18	11 July 1993	Estadio Azteca, Mexico City, Mexico	Martinique	7–0	9–0	1993 CONCACAF Gold Cup	
19	11 July 1993	Estadio Azteca, Mexico City, Mexico	Martinique	8–0	9–0	1993 CONCACAF Gold Cup	
20	18 July 1993	Estadio Azteca, Mexico City, Mexico	Canada	4–0	8–0	1993 CONCACAF Gold Cup	
21	18 July 1993	Estadio Azteca, Mexico City, Mexico	Canada	5–0	8–0	1993 CONCACAF Gold Cup	
22	22 July 1993	Estadio Azteca, Mexico City, Mexico	Jamaica	5–1	6–1	1993 CONCACAF Gold Cup	
23	25 July 1993	Estadio Azteca, Mexico City, Mexico	United States	3–0	4–0	1993 CONCACAF Gold Cup	
24	16 October 1996	Estadio Azteca, Mexico City, Mexico	Jamaica	1–0	2–1	1998 FIFA World Cup qualification	
25	31 October 1996	Estadio Azteca, Mexico City, Mexico	Saint Vincent and the Grenadines	3–0	5–1	1998 FIFA World Cup qualification	
26	6 November 1996	Estadio Azteca, Mexico City, Mexico	Honduras	3–0	3–1	1998 FIFA World Cup qualification	
27	19 January 1997	Rose Bowl, Pasadena, United States	United States	1–0	2–0	Friendly	
28	2 March 1997	Estadio Azteca, Mexico City, Mexico	Canada	4–0	4–0	1998 FIFA World Cup qualification	
29	5 October 1997	Estadio Azteca, Mexico City, Mexico	El Salvador	4–0	5–0	1998 FIFA World Cup qualification	
30	31 October 2001	Estadio Cuauhtémoc, Puebla, Mexico	El Salvador	3–0	4–1	Friendly	

== Honours ==
América

- Mexican Primera División: 1987–88, 1988–89
- Campeón de Campeones: 1988, 1989
- CONCACAF Champions' Cup: 1987, 1990, 1992

Mexico

- CONCACAF Gold Cup: 1993

Individual

- CONCACAF Gold Cup Golden Boot: 1993

Records

- Club América All Time Leading Goalscorer
