= Guillermo Cantú =

Mexican footballer (born 1968)

Personal information
- Full name: Guillermo Luis Cantú Sáenz
- Date of birth: 12 January 1968 (age 58)
- Place of birth: Torreón, Mexico
- Height: 1.80 m (5 ft 11 in)
- Position: Midfielder

Senior career*
Years	Team	Apps	(Gls)
1989–1997	Atlante	131	(18)
1990–1991	→ León (loan)	7	(1)
1997–1998	Celaya	12	(0)
Total		150	(19)

International career
1993–1994	Mexico	4	(1)
- * Club domestic league appearances and goals

Guillermo Luis Cantú Sáenz (born 12 January 1968) is a Mexican former footballer who played at both professional and international levels as a midfielder.

== Playing career ==
Born in Torreón, Cantú played professionally for Atlante, Club León and Atlético Celaya. He spent the prime years of his career at Atlante. During the 1992–93 season, he worked his way into the starting lineup, scoring six goals from midfield as Atlante won the championship. Cantú continued to start regularly for Atlante during the next two years, but his playing time diminished in subsequent seasons because of injuries. He played his final top-division matches with Celaya in 1998 at the age of 30.

He also represented Mexico at international level, earning a total of 4 caps. He made two appearances at the 1993 CONCACAF Gold Cup, playing in an 8–0 victory over Canada and in the 4–0 victory over the United States in the final. Although he participated in the Gold Cup success, he was unable to break into the plans of coach Miguel Mejia Baron in time to make the squad for the 1994 FIFA World Cup.

== Coaching and administration ==
Since his playing career, Cantú has been active in Mexican soccer administration. He was the director of national selections for the Federación Mexicana de Fútbol Asociación from 2004 to 2009, when he resigned after Mexico failed to qualify for the 2009 FIFA U-20 World Cup. He also served as president of Santos Laguna and Chiapas, holding the latter post from 2010 to 2012.
