= Luis Miguel Salvador =

Mexican footballer (born 1968)

Personal information
- Full name: Luis Miguel Salvador López
- Date of birth: 26 February 1968 (age 58)
- Place of birth: Mexico City, Mexico
- Height: 1.76 m (5 ft 9 in)
- Position: Forward

Senior career*
Years	Team	Apps	(Gls)
1989–1995	Atlante F.C.		
1995–1997	CF Monterrey		
1997–1999	Atlético Celaya		
2000	Atlante F.C.		

International career
1993–1995	Mexico	20	(8)
- * Club domestic league appearances and goals

Luis Miguel Salvador López (born 26 February 1968) is a Mexican former professional footballer who played as a forward.

== Career ==
Salvador was on Mexico national team at the 1994 FIFA World Cup, playing only 10 minutes during the Republic of Ireland match.

Salvador is the third scorer in Atlante history, just below "Cabinho" and Horacio Casarin. He used the number 9 in his jersey, he changed it to 68 when Hugo Sánchez came to Atlante F.C.

Salvador was champion of the Mexico league in the 1992–1993 season. In that squad he played with noteworthy players as Daniel Guzmán, Miguel Herrera, Raúl Gutiérrez, and Roberto Andrade. The coach was Ricardo Lavolpe. In this season, Salvador finished second in the top scorers list, just below Ivo Basay.

During his stay with Celaya, Salvador's goal celebration antics were unique. He pretended to be meditating, playing golf, fishing, and other unusual behaviors.

== Career statistics ==
=== International goals ===
No.	Date	Venue	Opponent	Score	Result	Competition
1	29 June 1993	Estadio Nacional, San José, Costa Rica	Costa Rica	—	2–0	Friendly
2	18 July 1993	Estadio Azteca, Mexico City, Mexico	Canada	7–0	8–0	1993 CONCACAF Gold Cup
3	18 July 1993	Estadio Azteca, Mexico City, Mexico	Canada	8–0	8–0	1993 CONCACAF Gold Cup
4	22 July 1993	Estadio Azteca, Mexico City, Mexico	Jamaica	1–0	6–1	1993 CONCACAF Gold Cup
5	22 July 1993	Estadio Azteca, Mexico City, Mexico	Jamaica	3–1	6–1	1993 CONCACAF Gold Cup
6	22 July 1993	Estadio Azteca, Mexico City, Mexico	Jamaica	4–1	6–1	1993 CONCACAF Gold Cup
7	20 October 1993	Jack Murphy Stadium, San Diego, United States	Ukraine	1–0	2–1	Friendly
8	3 November 1993	Jack Murphy Stadium, San Diego, United States	China	2–0	3–0	Friendly

== Honours ==
Atlante

- Mexican Primera División: 1992–93

Mexico

- CONCACAF Gold Cup: 1993
