= Raymond Destin =

Martiniquais football manager (1945/1946–2025)

Personal information
- Date of birth: 1945 or 1946
- Place of birth: Martinique
- Date of death: 1 June 2025 (aged 79)

Managerial career
- Years: Team
- 1993: Martinique
- 2002: RC Rivière-Pilote

Raymond Destin (1945 or 1946 – 1 June 2025) was a Martiniquais football manager. He was the first manager to coach the Martinique national team at the CONCACAF Gold Cup. Destin died on 1 June 2025, at the age of 79.

== Honours ==
Martinique national football team

- Caribbean Cup:

1993

- CONCACAF Gold Cup:

1st round

RC Rivière-Pilote

- Coupe de la Martinique:

finalist: 2002
