= Desmond Armstrong =

American soccer player (born 1964)

Personal information
- Full name: Desmond Kevin Armstrong
- Date of birth: November 2, 1964 (age 62)
- Place of birth: Washington, D.C., U.S.
- Height: 6 ft 0 in (1.83 m)
- Positions: Defender; right-back

College career
Years	Team	Apps	(Gls)
1982–1985	Maryland Terrapins	78	(24)

Senior career*
Years	Team	Apps	(Gls)
1986–1988	Cleveland Force (indoor)	93	(14)
1988–1989	Baltimore Blast (indoor)	19	(5)
1991	Santos	0	(0)
1991	Maryland Bays	4	(0)
1995	Washington Warthogs (indoor)	1	(0)
1996	Charlotte Eagles		
Total		117	(19)

International career
1987–1994	United States	81	(0)

Managerial career
- 1999–2006: Montreat College
Medal record
Representing United States
Winner	CONCACAF Gold Cup	1991
Runner-up	CONCACAF Gold Cup	1993
Men's Soccer
- * Club domestic league appearances and goals

Desmond Kevin Armstrong (born November 2, 1964) is an American former soccer player. A defender and midfielder, he was a member of the United States national team from 1987 to 1994. He played three seasons in the Major Indoor Soccer League, part of one in the Brazilian First Division, two in the American Professional Soccer League and two in USISL. After he retired from playing, Armstrong continued to play an active role in the sport, coaching and supporting community clubs. In June 2018 he was appointed technical director of FC Columbus in the National Premier Soccer League.

== Early life ==
Desmond Kevin Armstrong was born on November 2, 1964, in Washington, D.C.. His family first lived in a mainly Black neighborhood in Hyattsville, Maryland. His family then moved to Wheaton, Md., a mainly White town, where they lived next to a family of which the father once was a member of the Ku Klux Klan. However, this family just ignored the Black family next door and did not trouble them.

He attended Howard High School in Ellicott City, Maryland, and then University of Maryland.

== Career ==
=== Youth ===
Up until age 11, basketball was Armstrong's main sport. After an altercation with another boy on the basketball court, the boy's father, who was a youth soccer coach, invited Armstrong to come try out for his team. From that point on Armstrong moved into high school, college, and national team soccer.

Armstrong's college career was spent at the University of Maryland, where he was first team All ACC in 1984 and 1985 and second team All ACC in 1983. He played in a total of 78 games for the university, tallying 24 goals and 18 assists. In 1986, he was part of the Fairfax Spartans club which won the National Amateur Cup, defeating St. Louis Busch 3–0. The Spartans featured other national team players John Kerr, Bruce Murray, and John Stollmeyer in addition to Armstrong.

=== Professional ===
Armstrong played two seasons for the Cleveland Force of the Major Indoor Soccer League (MISL) from 1986 to 1988. At the end of the 1987–1988 season, he transferred to the Baltimore Blast. However, on January 14, 1989, he broke his leg midway through the season.

In February 1991, he signed with Santos of the Brazilian First Division making Armstrong the first American player ever to sign a professional contract in Brazil. Upon completing the season Armstrong returned to the U.S. with the Maryland Bays, in the American Professional Soccer League. That year, the Bays made it to the league semifinals before falling to the Albany Capitals.

In 1995, he moved to the Washington Warthogs of the Continental Indoor Soccer League on loan from Major League Soccer as he was the fifth player signed to the new league. Armstrong decided to compete with the Charlotte Eagles of the United States Interregional Soccer League (USISL) for the 1996 season opting out of his contract with Major League Soccer and later retiring from the game at the age of 31.

That year he was selected to the USISL All Pro League Team.

=== National team ===
His first appearance for the United States national team came in 1987 in a match against Egypt. He was also a member of the Olympic team in the 1988 Summer Olympics in Seoul, South Korea. His performance with the Olympic team made him a mainstay on the national team through the early 1990s, playing in all three of the team's appearances at the 1990 FIFA World Cup. He made a total of 81 appearances for the national team, though he never scored a goal at this level.

After the U.S. had exited the 1990 World Cup in the first round, Armstrong, one of two Black players on the team, criticized the U.S. Soccer Federation for not doing more to recruit Black youth in the inner cities.

Armstrong was the first U.S.-born African American player to represent the nation at the World Cup.

=== Other roles in soccer ===
Since his retirement from international soccer, he has remained active in coaching and community initiatives. He has spent time organizing for inner-city Christian Ministries programs such as Soccer Beats (now Heroes FA) Also now owning a team based out of Murfreesboro Tennessee Legacy Heroes FC. With a new entrance into Pioneer Premier League 2, led By Luis A. In the mid-1990s he coached the USA Hurricanes club level soccer team in Charlotte, NC.

In 2002, he became the head coach and director of soccer operations of the Montreat College Cavaliers in Montreat, North Carolina, which played in the NAIA. He remained in this position until his retirement on May 7, 2004, citing family reasons and an expanded role as Director of Premier Soccer Academies. He also coached the youth team '85 HFC Vipers of Asheville, North Carolina from 2000 to 2004.

After leaving Montreat, Armstrong joined the youth club Bethesda Roadrunners, as its head coach. He also created another section of Heroes FA, in Maryland and is currently their head coach and technical director. He is also the Director of Recruiting in Ohio for Brad Friedel's Premier Soccer Academies.

He was named technical director of Rocket City United on December 11, 2009.

In 2012, he created the Heroes Soccer Club in Nashville, Tennessee. As of 2022, the youth soccer club has 550 players and plays in several venues in the Nashville area.

In June 2018, Armstrong was appointed technical director of FC Columbus in the National Premier Soccer League.

==== Broadcaster ====
Armstrong has worked for ABC Sports. During the 1994 FIFA World Cup, Armstrong was an ESPN studio analyst. Armstrong provided commentary for all Cleveland City Stars home games on SportsTime Ohio.

== Recognition and awards ==
On May 11, 2007, he was inducted into the Maryland Soccer Hall of Fame.

In 2012, he was inducted to the National Soccer Hall of Fame.

== Personal life ==
Armstrong's sons, Ezra and Dida, are also professional soccer players. in May 2026, Armstrong converted to Eastern Orthodoxy.
