= Miguel Mejía Barón =

Mexican footballer and manager (born 1944)

Personal information
- Full name: Miguel Mejía Barón
- Date of birth: 14 April 1944 (age 82)
- Place of birth: Mexico City, Mexico
- Position: Defender

Senior career*
Years	Team	Apps	(Gls)
1964–1976	Pumas UNAM		

Managerial career
- 1988–1991: Pumas UNAM
- 1991–1992: Monterrey
- 1993–1995: Mexico
- 1996–1998: Atlante
- 1999: UANL
- 2000: Puebla
- 2001: Pumas UNAM
- 2016–2021: Tigres UANL (Assistant)
- * Club domestic league appearances and goals

Miguel Mejía Barón (born 17 April 1944) is a Mexican former professional footballer and manager.

== Career ==
As a player, Mejía Barón spent his entire professional career with Pumas UNAM, making his first-team debut in 1964 and remaining with the club until his retirement in 1976.

Several years later, he began his managerial career with Pumas during the 1988-89 season. He captured his first title as head coach by leading the club to victory in the 1989 CONCACAF Champions' Cup. Two years later, he guided Pumas to their third league championship during the 1990-91 season, further cementing his legacy with the institution.

In 1991, he briefly managed Monterrey before being appointed head coach of the Mexico national team. During his tenure, Mexico won the 1993 CONCACAF Gold Cup, finished as runner-up at the 1993 Copa América, and reached the Round of 16 at the 1994 FIFA World Cup, where the team was eliminated by Bulgaria in a penalty shootout. In 1995, Mexico also secured third place in the King Fahd Cup.

Mejía Barón concluded his spell with the national team in 1995. He subsequently managed Atlante, Puebla, and Tigres UANL before returning to Pumas UNAM, where he led the team during the 2001 Verano and Invierno tournaments. Following that stint, he retired from football management.

In 2016, Mejía Barón became part of Ricardo Ferretti’s coaching staff at Tigres UANL. He returned to Pumas UNAM in 2021 as Vice President of Sports Affairs, a role he served in until 2025.

== Honours ==
=== Manager ===
Pumas UNAM

- CONCACAF Champions' Cup: 1989
- Mexican Primera División: 1990–91

Mexico

- CONCACAF Gold Cup: 1993

== Team coach ==
- 1988-1991: (Mexico) Pumas UNAM
- 1991-1992: (Mexico) Monterrey
- 1993-1995: Mexico national football team
- 1996-1998: (Mexico) Atlante
- 1999: (Mexico) Tigres UANL
- 2000: (Mexico) Puebla
- 2001: (Mexico) Pumas UNAM
