= 1991 CONCACAF Gold Cup squads =

Below are the player squads of the teams participating in the 1991 CONCACAF Gold Cup.

== Group A ==
=== Canada ===
Head coach: (England) Tony Waiters

| No. | Pos. | Player | Date of birth (age) | Caps | Goals | Club |
|---|---|---|---|---|---|---|
| 1 | GK | Craig Forrest | 20 September 1967 (aged 23) | | | (The Football Association) Ipswich Town |
| 2 | DF | Frank Yallop | 4 April 1964 (aged 27) | | | (The Football Association) Ipswich Town |
| 3 | DF | Colin Miller | 10 April 1964 (aged 27) | | | (Scottish Football Association) Hamilton Academical |
| 4 | MF | John Limniatis | 24 June 1967 (aged 24) | | | (Hellenic Football Federation) Aris |
| 5 | DF | Randy Samuel | 23 December 1963 (aged 27) | | | (Royal Dutch Football Association) Fortuna Sittard |
| 6 | DF | Ian Bridge | 18 September 1959 (aged 31) | | | (Canadian Soccer Association) North York Rockets |
| 7 | MF | Carl Valentine | 4 July 1958 (aged 32) | | | (Canadian Soccer Association) Vancouver 86ers |
| 8 | MF | Jamie Lowery | 15 January 1961 (aged 30) | | | (Canadian Soccer Association) Vancouver 86ers |
| 9 | FW | Dale Mitchell | 21 April 1958 (aged 33) | | | (Canadian Soccer Association) Toronto Blizzard |
| 10 | FW | John Catliff | 8 January 1965 (aged 26) | | | (Canadian Soccer Association) Vancouver 86ers |
| 11 | MF | Joseph Majcher | 17 March 1960 (aged 31) | | | (Canadian Soccer Association) North York Rockets |
| 12 | FW | Nick Gilbert | 20 July 1965 (aged 25) | | | (Canadian Soccer Association) Hamilton Steelers |
| 13 | MF | Scott Munson | 3 January 1970 (aged 21) | | | (Canadian Soccer Association) Kitchener Kickers |
| 14 | DF | Mark Watson | 8 September 1970 (aged 20) | | | (Canadian Soccer Association) Hamilton Steelers |
| 15 | DF | Patrick Diotte | 13 November 1967 (aged 23) | | | (Canadian Soccer Association) Montreal Supra |
| 16 | MF | Peter Gilfillan | 29 December 1965 (aged 25) | | | (Canadian Soccer Association) Kitchener Kickers |
| 17 | DF | Carl Fletcher | 26 December 1971 (aged 19) | | | (Canadian Soccer Association) Toronto Blizzard |
| 18 | GK | Carlo Marini | 5 November 1972 (aged 18) | | | (Canadian Soccer Association) Vancouver 86ers |
| 20 | GK | Paul Dolan | 16 April 1966 (aged 25) | | | (Canadian Soccer Association) Vancouver 86ers |

=== Honduras ===
Head coach: (Brazil) Flavio Ortega

| No. | Pos. | Player | Date of birth (age) | Caps | Goals | Club |
|---|---|---|---|---|---|---|
| 1 | GK | Belarmino Rivera | 5 February 1956 (aged 35) | | | (National Autonomous Federation of Football of Honduras) Olimpia |
| 2 | MF | Gilberto Yearwood | 15 March 1956 (aged 35) | | | (National Autonomous Federation of Football of Honduras) Olimpia |
| 4 | DF | Juan Castro | 11 July 1972 (aged 18) | | | (National Autonomous Federation of Football of Honduras) Real España |
| 5 | DF | Raúl Sambulá | 14 March 1963 (aged 28) | | | (Mexican Football Federation) UAT |
| 6 | DF | Mauricio Fúnez | 10 May 1959 (aged 32) | | | (National Autonomous Federation of Football of Honduras) Real España |
| 7 | FW | Eugenio Dolmo Flores | 31 July 1965 (aged 25) | | | (National Autonomous Federation of Football of Honduras) Olimpia |
| 8 | MF | Juan Espinoza | 24 August 1958 (aged 32) | | | (National Autonomous Federation of Football of Honduras) Olimpia |
| 9 | MF | Luis Vallejo | 24 June 1968 (aged 23) | | | (National Autonomous Federation of Football of Honduras) Real España |
| 10 | FW | Luis Cálix | 30 August 1965 (aged 25) | | | (National Autonomous Federation of Football of Honduras) Real España |
| 11 | FW | Alex Ávila | 26 December 1964 (aged 26) | | | (National Autonomous Federation of Football of Honduras) Motagua |
| 12 | MF | Tomás Róchez | 1 October 1964 (aged 26) | | | (Mexican Football Federation) Santos Laguna |
| 14 | DF | Arnold Cruz | 21 December 1971 (aged 19) | | | (National Autonomous Federation of Football of Honduras) Olimpia |
| 15 | MF | Camilo Bonilla | 30 September 1971 (aged 19) | | | (National Autonomous Federation of Football of Honduras) Real España |
| 16 | MF | Nahamán González | 23 June 1967 (aged 24) | | | (National Autonomous Federation of Football of Honduras) Real España |
| 18 | DF | Daniel Zapata | 22 March 1959 (aged 32) | | | (National Autonomous Federation of Football of Honduras) Olimpia |
| 19 | FW | Eduardo Bennett | 11 September 1968 (aged 22) | | | (National Autonomous Federation of Football of Honduras) Olimpia |
| 21 | DF | Marco Anariba | 18 February 1968 (aged 23) | | | (National Autonomous Federation of Football of Honduras) Real España |
| 25 | GK | Wilmer Cruz | 18 December 1968 (aged 22) | | | (National Autonomous Federation of Football of Honduras) Real España |

=== Jamaica ===
Head coach: Carl Brown

| No. | Pos. | Player | Date of birth (age) | Caps | Club |
|---|---|---|---|---|---|
| 1 | GK | Clive Smith | 27 October 1968 (aged 22) | | (Jamaica) Tivoli Gardens F.C. |
| 2 | DF | Barrington Gaynor | 27 September 1965 (aged 25) | | (United States) Alderson Broaddus University |
| 3 | DF | Richard Davis | 24 May 1966 (aged 25) | | (Jamaica) Humble Lions F.C. |
| 4 | DF | Linval Dixon | 14 September 1971 (aged 19) | | (Jamaica) Clarendon College |
| 5 | DF | Donovan Panton | 13 August 1963 (aged 27) | | (Jamaica) Boys' Town |
| 6 | DF | Desmond Smith | 30 October 1966 (aged 24) | | (Jamaica) Benfica FC |
| 7 | DF | Anthony Corbett | 18 June 1961 (aged 30) | | (Jamaica) Hazard United |
| 8 | MF | Leroy Foster | 16 October 1967 (aged 23) | | (Jamaica) Benfica FC |
| 9 | FW | Paul Davis | 13 July 1962 (aged 28) | | (Jamaica) Seba United |
| 10 | MF | Hugh Blair | 27 November 1965 (aged 25) | | (Jamaica) Spanish Town |
| 11 | MF | Winston Anglin | 27 August 1962 (aged 28) | | (Jamaica) Wadadah |
| 12 | MF | Roderick Reid | 10 January 1970 (aged 21) | | (Jamaica) Basovak F.C. |
| 13 | FW | Caple Donaldson | 5 October 1966 (aged 24) | | (Jamaica) FC Reno |
| 14 | MF | Monteque Long | 16 April 1962 (aged 29) | | (Jamaica) Spanish Town |
| 15 | MF | Hector Wright | 8 May 1969 (aged 22) | | (Jamaica) Seba United |
| 16 | MF | Wayne Palmer | 8 September 1967 (aged 23) | | (Jamaica) Basovak F.C. |
| 17 | FW | Walter Boyd | 1 January 1972 (aged 19) | | (Jamaica) Humble Lions F.C. |
| 20 | GK | Kristopher DaCosta | 30 May 1970 (aged 21) | | (Jamaica) Boys' Town |

=== Mexico ===
Head coach: Manuel Lapuente

| No. | Pos. | Player | Date of birth (age) | Caps | Club |
|---|---|---|---|---|---|
| 1 | GK | Pablo Larios | 31 July 1960 (aged 30) | | (Mexico) Puebla |
| 2 | DF | Juan Hernández | 8 March 1965 (aged 26) | | (Mexico) América |
| 3 | DF | Efraín Herrera | 28 September 1959 (aged 31) | | (Mexico) Necaxa |
| 4 | DF | Roberto Ruiz Esparza | 16 January 1965 (aged 26) | | (Mexico) Puebla |
| 5 | DF | Héctor Esparza | 31 October 1960 (aged 30) | | (Mexico) Cruz Azul |
| 6 | MF | Carlos Muñoz (c) | 8 September 1962 (aged 28) | | (Mexico) Tigres UANL |
| 8 | MF | José Manuel de la Torre | 13 November 1965 (aged 25) | | (Mexico) Puebla |
| 10 | MF | Benjamín Galindo | 11 December 1960 (aged 30) | | (Mexico) Guadalajara |
| 11 | MF | Gonzalo Farfán | 25 February 1963 (aged 28) | | (Mexico) América |
| 12 | GK | Adrián Chávez | 27 June 1962 (aged 29) | | (Mexico) América |
| 13 | FW | René Paul Moreno | 1 September 1962 (aged 28) | | (Mexico) Guadalajara |
| 14 | DF | Félix Cruz | 4 April 1961 (aged 30) | | (Mexico) Monterrey |
| 15 | MF | Missael Espinoza | 12 April 1965 (aged 26) | | (Mexico) Monterrey |
| 16 | MF | Jorge Dávalos | 28 April 1957 (aged 34) | | (Mexico) Leones Negros UdeG |
| 17 | FW | Luís Roberto Alves | 23 May 1967 (aged 24) | | (Mexico) América |
| 18 | DF | Guillermo Muñoz | 20 October 1961 (aged 29) | | (Mexico) Monterrey |
| 19 | FW | Luis García | 1 June 1969 (aged 22) | | (Mexico) Pumas UNAM |
| 27 | FW | Carlos Hermosillo | 24 August 1964 (aged 26) | | (Mexico) Monterrey |

== Group B ==
=== Costa Rica ===
Head coach: (Costa Rica) Rolando Villalobos

| No. | Pos. | Player | Date of birth (age) | Caps | Club |
|---|---|---|---|---|---|
| 1 | GK | Luis Gabelo Conejo | 1 January 1960 (aged 31) | | (Spain) Albacete |
| 2 | DF | Vladimir Quesada | 12 May 1966 (aged 25) | | (Costa Rica) Saprissa |
| 3 | DF | Róger Flores (c) | 26 May 1959 (aged 32) | | (Costa Rica) Saprissa |
| 4 | DF | Rónald González | 8 August 1970 (aged 20) | | (Austria) Vorwärts Steyr |
| 5 | MF | Róger Gómez | 7 February 1965 (aged 26) | | (Costa Rica) Cartaginés |
| 6 | DF | Héctor Marchena | 4 January 1965 (aged 26) | | (Costa Rica) Cartaginés |
| 7 | FW | Claudio Jara | 6 May 1959 (aged 32) | | (Costa Rica) Herediano |
| 8 | MF | Carlos Velásquez | 14 May 1961 (aged 30) | | (Costa Rica) Puntarenas |
| 9 | FW | Hernán Medford | 23 May 1968 (aged 23) | | (Austria) Rapid Wien |
| 10 | MF | Óscar Ramírez | 8 December 1964 (aged 26) | | (Costa Rica) Alajuelense |
| 11 | FW | Leonidas Flores | 24 January 1965 (aged 26) | | (Costa Rica) Puntarenas |
| 12 | MF | Austin Berry | 5 April 1971 (aged 20) | | (Costa Rica) Alajuelense |
| 13 | DF | Ricardo Chacón | 13 May 1966 (aged 25) | | (Costa Rica) Alajuelense |
| 14 | FW | Norman Gómez | 9 January 1965 (aged 26) | | (Costa Rica) Guanacasteca |
| 15 | DF | Edwin Salazar | 2 November 1964 (aged 26) | | (Costa Rica) Saprissa |
| 16 | MF | Floyd Guthrie | 14 March 1966 (aged 25) | | (Costa Rica) Uruguay de Coronado |
| 17 | MF | Juan Carlos Arguedas | 3 May 1970 (aged 21) | | (Costa Rica) Alajuelense |
| 18 | GK | Pedro Cubillo | 12 May 1968 (aged 23) | | (Costa Rica) Guanacasteca |
| 20 | DF | Mauricio Montero | 19 October 1963 (aged 27) | | (Costa Rica) Alajuelense |

=== Guatemala ===
Head coach: (Guatemala) Haroldo Cordón

| No. | Pos. | Player | Date of birth (age) | Caps | Club |
|---|---|---|---|---|---|
| 2 | DF | René Villavicencio | 6 October 1968 (aged 22) | | (Guatemala) Xelajú |
| 3 | DF | Erick Miranda | 17 December 1971 (aged 19) | | (Guatemala) Amatitlán |
| 4 | DF | Rocael Mazariegos | 8 January 1966 (aged 25) | | (Guatemala) Juventud Retalteca |
| 6 | DF | Eduardo Acevedo | 8 June 1964 (aged 27) | | (Guatemala) Comunicaciones |
| 7 | DF | Byron Guerrera | | | (Guatemala) Aduana Central |
| 8 | FW | Carlos Castañeda | 4 January 1963 (aged 28) | | (Guatemala) Suchitepéquez |
| 9 | MF | Luis Espel | 8 July 1964 (aged 26) | | (Guatemala) Aduana Central |
| 10 | FW | Edwin Westphal | 4 March 1966 (aged 25) | | (Guatemala) Izabal JC |
| 11 | DF | Iván León | 3 March 1967 (aged 24) | | (Guatemala) Comunicaciones |
| 12 | DF | Leonel Contreras | | | (Guatemala) Tipografia Nacional |
| 13 | MF | Carlos Méndez | | | (Guatemala) Tipografia Nacional |
| 14 | FW | Julio Rodas | 9 December 1966 (aged 24) | | (Guatemala) Municipal |
| 15 | FW | Jorge Aníbal Vargas | | | (Guatemala) Juventud Copalera |
| 16 | MF | Édgar Valencia | 31 March 1971 (aged 20) | | (Guatemala) Galcasa |
| 18 | FW | Ronald Remis | 15 October 1969 (aged 21) | | (Guatemala) Galcasa |
| 22 | GK | Júlio César Englenton | 24 January 1962 (aged 29) | | (Guatemala) Aurora |
| 23 | GK | Jorge Marotta | 23 September 1961 (aged 29) | | (Guatemala) Jalapa |

=== Trinidad and Tobago ===
Head coach: (Trinidad and Tobago) Edgar Vidale

| No. | Pos. | Player | Date of birth (age) | Caps | Club |
|---|---|---|---|---|---|
| 1 | GK | Michael Maurice | 11 November 1957 (aged 33) | | (Trinidad and Tobago) Police |
| 2 | MF | Paul Elliott-Allen | 27 June 1963 (aged 28) | | (Trinidad and Tobago) Trintoc |
| 3 | DF | Kirk Solomon | | | (Trinidad and Tobago) Maple |
| 4 | MF | Larry Joseph | 3 April 1964 (aged 27) | | (Trinidad and Tobago) |
| 5 | DF | Clayton Morris | 5 June 1962 (aged 29) | | (Trinidad and Tobago) Maple |
| 6 | DF | Marvin Faustin | 22 October 1967 (aged 23) | | (Trinidad and Tobago) Superstar Rangers |
| 7 | DF | Ronnie Simmons | 9 July 1964 (aged 26) | | (United States) Baltimore Blast |
| 8 | MF | Hutson Charles | 16 September 1965 (aged 25) | | (Trinidad and Tobago) Defence Force |
| 9 | FW | Dexter Skeene | 1 April 1964 (aged 27) | | (Trinidad and Tobago) |
| 10 | MF | Russell Latapy | 2 August 1968 (aged 22) | | (Portugal) Académica |
| 11 | FW | Leonson Lewis | 30 December 1966 (aged 24) | | (Portugal) Académica |
| 14 | FW | Philibert Jones | 12 November 1964 (aged 26) | | (Trinidad and Tobago) Trintoc |
| 15 | DF | Alvin Thomas | 17 November 1966 (aged 24) | | (Trinidad and Tobago) Malta Caribs |
| 17 | MF | Kerry Jamerson | 25 July 1967 (aged 23) | | (Trinidad and Tobago) Defence Force |
| 18 | MF | Kelvin Jones | 2 January 1962 (aged 29) | | (Trinidad and Tobago) Malta Caribs |
| 19 | DF | Dexter Lee | 1 March 1966 (aged 25) | | (Trinidad and Tobago) Defence Force |
| 20 | MF | Brian Haynes | 7 May 1962 (aged 29) | | (United States) Maryland Bays |
| 21 | GK | Anthony Clarke | 8 July 1964 (aged 26) | | (Trinidad and Tobago) Point Fortin Civic F.C. |

=== United States ===
Head coach: (Socialist Federal Republic of Yugoslavia) Bora Milutinović

| No. | Pos. | Player | Date of birth (age) | Caps | Club |
|---|---|---|---|---|---|
| 1 | GK | Tony Meola | 21 February 1969 (aged 22) | | (United States) Fort Lauderdale Strikers |
| 2 | DF | Steve Trittschuh | 24 April 1965 (aged 26) | | (Czechoslovakia) Sparta Prague |
| 3 | DF | Janusz Michallik | 22 April 1966 (aged 25) | | (United States) Atlanta Attack |
| 4 | FW | Bruce Murray | 25 January 1966 (aged 25) | | (United States) Maryland Bays |
| 5 | MF | Ted Eck | 14 July 1966 (aged 24) | | (Canada) Toronto Blizzard |
| 7 | MF | Hugo Perez | 8 November 1963 (aged 27) | | (Sweden) Örgryte IS |
| 8 | DF | Dominic Kinnear | 26 July 1967 (aged 23) | | (United States) San Francisco Bay Blackhawks |
| 10 | FW | Peter Vermes (c) | 21 November 1966 (aged 24) | | (United States) Tampa Bay Rowdies |
| 11 | FW | Eric Wynalda | 9 June 1969 (aged 22) | | (United States) San Francisco Bay Blackhawks |
| 14 | MF | Brian Quinn | 26 May 1960 (aged 31) | | (United States) San Diego Sockers |
| 15 | DF | Desmond Armstrong | 2 November 1964 (aged 26) | | (United States) Maryland Bays |
| 16 | DF | John Doyle | 16 March 1966 (aged 25) | | (Sweden) Örgryte IS |
| 17 | DF | Marcelo Balboa | 8 August 1967 (aged 23) | | (United States) San Francisco Bay Blackhawks |
| 18 | GK | Mark Dodd | 14 September 1965 (aged 25) | | (United States) Colorado Foxes |
| 19 | MF | Chris Henderson | 11 December 1970 (aged 20) | | (United States) UCLA |
| 20 | MF | Paul Caligiuri | 9 March 1964 (aged 27) | | (Germany) Hansa Rostock |
| 21 | DF | Fernando Clavijo | 23 January 1957 (aged 34) | | (United States) St. Louis Storm |
| 22 | DF | Bruce Savage | 21 December 1960 (aged 30) | | (United States) Baltimore Blast |
