= 1991 CONCACAF Gold Cup final =

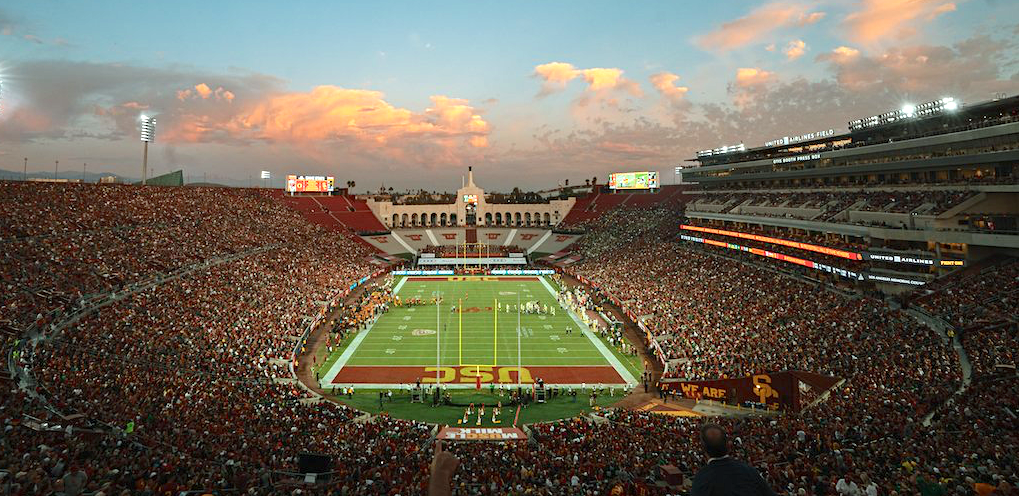
- Los Angeles Memorial Coliseum in Los Angeles hosted the final
- Event: 1991 CONCACAF Gold Cup
Honduras	United States
0	0
- After extra time United States won 4–3 on penalties
- Date: July 7, 1991
- Venue: Los Angeles Memorial Coliseum, Los Angeles
- Referee: Arturo Brizio Carter (Mexico)
- Attendance: 39,873

The 1991 CONCACAF Gold Cup final was a football match played on July 7, 1991, at the Memorial Coliseum in Los Angeles, to determine the winner of the 1991 CONCACAF Gold Cup. United States beat Honduras 4–3 on penalties after the game finished 0–0 after extra time. This was the United States' first major title. It was also the first ever Gold Cup Final and first to be decided by a penalty shoot-out. As Gold Cup champion, the United States represented CONCACAF at the 1992 King Fahd Cup in Saudi Arabia.

== Route to the final ==
Honduras
Round
United States
Opponents
Result
Group stage
Opponents
Result
Canada
4–2
Match 1
Trinidad and Tobago
2–1
Jamaica
5–0
Match 2
Guatemala
3–0
Mexico
1–1
Match 3
Costa Rica
3–2
Group A winners

Team	Pld	GD	Pts
Honduras	3	+7	5
Mexico	3	+5	5
Canada	3	–3	2
Jamaica	3	–9	0

Final standings
Group B winners

Team	Pld	GD	Pts
United States	3	+5	6
Costa Rica	3	0	2
Trinidad and Tobago	3	–1	2
Guatemala	3	–4	2

Opponents
Result
Knockout stage
Opponents
Result
Costa Rica
2–0
Semi-finals
Mexico
2–0

== Match details ==
July 7, 1991

Honduras	0–0 (a.e.t.)	United States
	Report
Penalties
Castro (penalty scored); Anariba (penalty missed); Yearwood (penalty missed); Flores (penalty scored); Zapata (penalty missed); Cálix (penalty missed); Vallejo (penalty scored); Espinoza (penalty missed)	3–4	(penalty scored) Balboa; (penalty missed) Vermes; (penalty missed) Pérez; (penalty scored) Caligiuri; (penalty missed) Eck; (penalty missed) Quinn; (penalty scored) Kinnear; (penalty scored) Clavijo

Memorial Coliseum, Los Angeles
Attendance: 39,873
Referee: Arturo Brizio Carter (Mexico)

Honduras	United States

GK	1	Belarmino Rivera		(substituted off) 119'
RB	5	Raúl Sambulá
CB	4	Juan F. Castro
CB		Marco Zelaya
LB	18	Daniel Zapata
RM	2	Gilberto Yearwood
CM	8	Juan C. Espinoza	(yellow card) 106'
CM	10	Luis Cálix
LM	6	Mauricio Fúnez
CF	7	Eugenio Flores
CF	19	Eduardo Bennett
Substitutes:
FW	9	Luis Vallejo		(substituted on) 69'
GK	25	Wilmer Cruz		(substituted on) 119'
Manager:
(Brazil) Flavio Ortega

GK	1	Tony Meola
RB	20	Paul Caligiuri
CB	17	Marcelo Balboa
CB	21	Fernando Clavijo
LB	10	Peter Vermes
RM	19	Chris Henderson
CM	16	John Doyle
CM	7	Hugo Pérez	(yellow card) 90'
LM	14	Brian Quinn
CF	11	Eric Wynalda		(substituted off) 61'
CF	4	Bruce Murray		(substituted off) 98'
Substitutes:
MF	5	Ted Eck		(substituted on) 61'
DF	8	Dominic Kinnear		(substituted on) 98'
Manager:
(Socialist Federal Republic of Yugoslavia) Bora Milutinović
