= 1991 CONCACAF Gold Cup knockout stage =

The knockout phase of 1991 CONCACAF Gold Cup began on July 5, 1991, with the quarter-finals and ended on July 7, 1991, with the final at the Los Angeles Memorial Coliseum in Los Angeles, United States.

== Qualified teams ==
The top two placed teams from each of the two groups, qualified for the knockout stage.

Group	Winners	Runners-up
A	Honduras	Mexico
B	United States	Costa Rica

== Bracket ==
Semi-finals
July 5 — Los Angeles
Honduras	2
Costa Rica	0
July 5 — Los Angeles
United States	2
Mexico	0

Final
July 7 — Los Angeles
United States (p)	0 (4)
Honduras	0 (3)
Third place play-off
July 7 — Los Angeles
Mexico	2
Costa Rica	0

== Semi-finals ==
=== Honduras vs Costa Rica ===
July 5, 1991

Honduras	2–0	Costa Rica
Bennett 37'; Flores 79'	Report

Memorial Coliseum, Los Angeles
Attendance: 41,103
Referee: Arturo Angeles (United States)

=== United States vs Mexico ===
July 5, 1991

United States	2–0	Mexico
Doyle 48'; Vermes 64'	Report

Memorial Coliseum, Los Angeles
Attendance: 41,103
Referee: José Carlos Ortiz (El Salvador)

== Third place play-off ==
July 7, 1991

Mexico	2–0	Costa Rica
Farfán 9'; Galindo 89'	Report

Memorial Coliseum, Los Angeles
Attendance: 39,873
Referee: Errol Forbes (Trinidad and Tobago)

== Final ==
July 7, 1991

Honduras	0–0 (a.e.t.)	United States
	Report
Penalties
Castro (penalty scored); Anariba (penalty missed); Yearwood (penalty missed); Flores (penalty scored); Zapata (penalty missed); Cálix (penalty missed); Vallejo (penalty scored); Espinoza (penalty missed)	3–4	(penalty scored) Balboa; (penalty missed) Vermes; (penalty missed) Pérez; (penalty scored) Caligiuri; (penalty missed) Eck; (penalty missed) Quinn; (penalty scored) Kinnear; (penalty scored) Clavijo

Memorial Coliseum, Los Angeles
Attendance: 39,873
Referee: Arturo Brizio Carter (Mexico)
