= 1991 CONCACAF Gold Cup =

1st edition of the CONCACAF Gold Cup

CONCACAF Championship
- 1991 CONCACAF Gold Cup official programme

Tournament details
- Host country: United States
- Dates: June 28 – July 7
- Teams: 8 (from 1 confederation)
- Venues: 2 (in 2 host cities)

Final positions
- Champions: United States (1st title)
- Runners-up: Honduras
- Third place: Mexico
- Fourth place: Costa Rica

Tournament statistics
- Matches played: 16
- Goals scored: 50 (3.13 per match)
- Attendance: 397,124 (24,820 per match)
- Top scorer(s): (Mexico) Benjamín Galindo (4 goals)
- Best player: (United States) Tony Meola

The 1991 CONCACAF Gold Cup was the first edition of the Gold Cup, the soccer championship of North America, Central America and the Caribbean (CONCACAF), and the eleventh overall CONCACAF tournament. The last time the CONCACAF Championship was held was 1971, from that point on the first-place finishers of World Cup qualifying were considered continental champions.

The tournament was hosted by the United States and played in the Greater Los Angeles area of California at two venues: the Los Angeles Memorial Coliseum and the Rose Bowl. The eight teams were broken up into two groups of four; the top two teams of each group would advance to the semifinals. The Gold Cup was won by the United States, who eliminated Mexico in the semi-finals match, and went on to beat Honduras 4–3 on penalties after tying them in the final 0–0. Fernando Clavijo scored the winning penalty in the shootout for the United States.

== Qualified teams ==
| Team | Qualification | Appearances | Previous best performance |
Qualified through the 1989 CONCACAF Championship
| Costa Rica | Winners | 1st | Debut |
North American zone
| United States | Automatic | 1st | Debut |
| Mexico | Automatic | 1st | Debut |
| Canada | Automatic | 1st | Debut |
Caribbean zone qualified through the 1991 Caribbean Cup
| Jamaica | Winners | 1st | Debut |
| Trinidad and Tobago | Runners-up | 1st | Debut |
Central American zone qualified through the 1991 UNCAF Nations Cup
| Honduras | Runners-up | 1st | Debut |
| Guatemala | Third Place | 1st | Debut |

== Venues ==
| Los Angeles | Pasadena |
|---|---|
| Memorial Coliseum | Rose Bowl |
| Capacity: 93,607 | Capacity: 92,542 |
1991 CONCACAF Gold Cup is located in the United States

== Squads ==
The 8 national teams involved in the tournament were required to register a squad of 18 players; only players in these squads were eligible to take part in the tournament.

== Group stage ==
=== Group A ===
| Pos | Team | Pld | W | D | L | GF | GA | GD | Pts | Qualification |
|---|---|---|---|---|---|---|---|---|---|---|
| 1 | Honduras | 3 | 2 | 1 | 0 | 10 | 3 | +7 | 5 | Advance to knockout stage |
| 2 | Mexico | 3 | 2 | 1 | 0 | 8 | 3 | +5 | 5 | Advance to knockout stage |
| 3 | Canada | 3 | 1 | 0 | 2 | 6 | 9 | −3 | 2 | |
| 4 | Jamaica | 3 | 0 | 0 | 3 | 3 | 12 | −9 | 0 | |

Source: RSSSF
June 28, 1991

| Canada | 2–4 | Honduras |
|---|---|---|
| Mitchell 66', 80' | Report | Bennett 28' (pen.); Espinoza 34'; Cálix 41'; Flores 51' |

Memorial Coliseum, Los Angeles
Attendance: 13,374
Referee: Arturo Angeles (United States)
June 28, 1991

| Mexico | 4–1 | Jamaica |
|---|---|---|
| Galindo 28', 54' (pen.); Zague 36'; Hermosillo 58' | Report | Reid 39' |

Memorial Coliseum, Los Angeles
Attendance: 13,374
Referee: Arlington Success (Antigua and Barbuda)
Team details

| Mexico | Jamaica |

| GK | 1 | Pablo Larios |
| RB | 2 | Juan Hernández |
| CB | 4 | Roberto Ruiz Esparza |
| CB | 14 | Felix Cruz |
| LB | 5 | Héctor Esparza |
| RM | 8 | José Manuel de la Torre |
| CM | 6 | Carlos Muñoz (c) |
| CM | 11 | Gonzalo Farfán |
| LM | 10 | Benjamín Galindo |
| RF | 27 | Carlos Hermosillo | (substituted off) 80' |
| LF | 17 | Luís Roberto Alves | (substituted off) 80' |
Substitutes:
| CB | 3 | Efraín Herrera |
| GK | 12 | Adrián Chávez |
| FW | 13 | Paul Moreno |
| LM | 15 | Missael Espinoza | (substituted on) 80' |
| CM | 16 | Jorge Dávalos |
| LB | 18 | Guillermo Muñoz |
| RF | 19 | Luis García | (substituted on) 80' |
Manager:
Manuel Lapuente

| GK | 1 | Clive Smith |
| DF | 2 | Barrington Gaynor |
| DF | 5 | Donovan Panton | (yellow card) 52' |
| DF | 6 | Desmond Smith | | (substituted off) 44' |
| DF | 7 | Anthony Corbett |
| MF | 10 | Hugh Blair |
| MF | 11 | Winston Anglin |
| MF | 15 | Hector Wright |
| MF | 16 | Wayne Palmer |
| MF | 12 | Roderick Reid | | (substituted on) 82' |
| FW | 9 | Paul Davis |
Substitutes:
| DF | 3 | Richard Davis |
| DF | 4 | Linval Dixon | | (substituted on) 44' |
| MF | 8 | Leroy Foster |
| FW | 13 | Caple Donaldson |
| MF | 14 | Monteque Long | | (substituted on) 82' |
| FW | 17 | Walter Boyd |
| GK | 20 | Kristopher DaCosta |
Manager:
Carl Brown

June 30, 1991

| Jamaica | 0–5 | Honduras |
|---|---|---|
| | Report | Cálix 27', 51'; Anariba 31'; Bennett 69'; Yearwood 89' |

Memorial Coliseum, Los Angeles
Attendance: 45,797
Referee: Errol Forbes (Trinidad and Tobago)
June 30, 1991

| Canada | 1–3 | Mexico |
|---|---|---|
| Lowery 83' | Report | Hermosillo 3' de la Torre 40'; Galindo 89' (pen.) |

Memorial Coliseum, Los Angeles
Attendance: 45,797
Referee: Ronald Gutiérrez (Costa Rica)
Team details

| Canada | Mexico |

| GK | 1 | Craig Forrest |
| DF | 2 | Frank Yallop |
| DF | 3 | Colin Miller |
| DF | 5 | Randy Samuel | (yellow card) 69' |
| DF | 6 | Ian Bridge | | (substituted off) 7' |
| MF | 7 | Carl Valentine |
| MF | 8 | Jamie Lowery | | (substituted off) 88' |
| FW | 9 | Dale Mitchell |
| FW | 10 | John Catliff |
| FW | 12 | Nick Gilbert |
| MF | 13 | Scott Munson | (yellow card) 46' |
Substitutes:
| MF | 4 | John Limniatis |
| MF | 11 | Joseph Majcher |
| DF | 14 | Mark Watson | (yellow card) 53' | (substituted on) 7' |
| DF | 15 | Patrick Diotte | | (substituted on) 88' |
| MF | 16 | Peter Gilfillan |
| DF | 17 | Carl Fletcher |
| GK | 18 | Carlo Marini |
| GK | 20 | Paul Dolan |
Manager:
(England) Tony Waiters

| GK | 12 | Adrián Chávez |
| RB | 2 | Juan Hernández |
| CB | 4 | Roberto Ruiz Esparza |
| CB | 14 | Felix Cruz | (yellow card) 14' |
| LB | 18 | Guillermo Muñoz |
| RM | 8 | José Manuel de la Torre | | (substituted off) 83' |
| CM | 16 | Jorge Dávalos |
| CM | 11 | Gonzalo Farfán | | (substituted off) 60' |
| LM | 10 | Benjamín Galindo |
| RF | 27 | Carlos Hermosillo |
| LF | 17 | Luís Roberto Alves |
Substitutes:
| GK | 1 | Pablo Larios |
| CB | 3 | Efraín Herrera |
| LB | 5 | Héctor Esparza |
| CM | 6 | Carlos Muñoz | | (substituted on) 83' (c) |
| LF | 13 | Paul Moreno |
| LM | 15 | Missael Espinoza | | (substituted on) 60' |
| RF | 19 | Luis García |
Manager:
Manuel Lapuente

July 2, 1991

| Jamaica | 2–3 | Canada |
|---|---|---|
| Wright 42'; Reid 63' | Report | Mitchell 34'; Miller 54'; Limniatis 60' |

Memorial Coliseum, Los Angeles
Attendance: 36,703
Referee: José Carlos Ortíz (El Salvador)
July 2, 1991

| Mexico | 1–1 | Honduras |
|---|---|---|
| Hermosillo 57' | Report | Anariba 9' |

Memorial Coliseum, Los Angeles
Attendance: 36,703
Referee: Jay Majid (United States)
Team details

| Mexico | Honduras |

| GK | 12 | Adrián Chávez |
| RB | 3 | Efraín Herrera |
| CB | 4 | Roberto Ruiz Esparza |
| CB | 5 | Héctor Esparza |
| LB | 18 | Guillermo Muñoz |
| RM | 15 | Missael Espinoza |
| CM | 6 | Carlos Muñoz (c) |
| LM | 16 | Jorge Dávalos | (substituted off) 57' |
| RF | 27 | Carlos Hermosillo |
| CF | 19 | Luis García |
| LF | 13 | Paul Moreno | (substituted off) 46' |
Substitutes:
| GK | 1 | Pablo Larios |
| RB | 2 | Juan Hernández |
| RM | 8 | José Manuel de la Torre | (substituted on) 57' |
| LM | 10 | Benjamín Galindo |
| CM | 11 | Gonzalo Farfán |
| CB | 14 | Felix Cruz |
| LF | 17 | Luís Roberto Alves | (substituted on) 46' |
Manager:
Manuel Lapuente

| GK | 1 | Belarmino Rivera |
| DF | 4 | Juan Castro |
| DF | 5 | Raúl Sambulá | | (substituted off) 46' |
| DF | 6 | Mauricio Fúnez |
| DF | 18 | Daniel Zapata |
| DF | 21 | Marco Anariba | (yellow card) 61' |
| MF | 12 | Tomás Róchez | | (substituted off) 77' |
| MF | 2 | Gilberto Yearwood |
| FW | 10 | Luis Cálix |
| FW | 7 | Eugenio Dolmo Flores |
| FW | 19 | Eduardo Bennett |
Substitutes:
| MF | 8 | Juan Espinoza |
| MF | 9 | Luis Vallejo |
| FW | 11 | Alex Ávila | | (substituted on) 46' |
| DF | 14 | Arnold Cruz |
| MF | 15 | Camilo Bonilla |
| MF | 16 | Nahamán González | | (substituted on) 77' |
| GK | 25 | Wilmer Cruz |
Manager:
(Brazil) Flavio Ortega

=== Group B ===
| Pos | Team | Pld | W | D | L | GF | GA | GD | Pts | Qualification |
|---|---|---|---|---|---|---|---|---|---|---|
| 1 | United States (H) | 3 | 3 | 0 | 0 | 8 | 3 | +5 | 6 | Advance to knockout stage |
| 2 | Costa Rica | 3 | 1 | 0 | 2 | 5 | 5 | 0 | 2 | Advance to knockout stage |
| 3 | Trinidad and Tobago | 3 | 1 | 0 | 2 | 3 | 4 | −1 | 2 | |
| 4 | Guatemala | 3 | 1 | 0 | 2 | 1 | 5 | −4 | 2 | |

Source: RSSSF
(H) Hosts
June 29, 1991

| Costa Rica | 2–0 | Guatemala |
|---|---|---|
| R. Gómez 14'; Flores 17' | Report |

Rose Bowl, Pasadena
Attendance: 18,435
Referee: Mike Siefert (Canada)
June 29, 1991

| United States | 2–1 | Trinidad and Tobago |
|---|---|---|
| Murray 85'; Balboa 87' | Report | Lewis 67' |

Rose Bowl, Pasadena
Attendance: 18,435
Referee: José Carlos Ortíz (El Salvador)

July 1, 1991

| Trinidad and Tobago | 2–1 | Costa Rica |
|---|---|---|
| Lewis 38'; Thomas 89' | Report | Medford 6' |

Rose Bowl, Pasadena
Attendance: 6,344
Referee: José Antonio Garza (Mexico)
July 1, 1991

| Guatemala | 0–3 | United States |
|---|---|---|
| | Report | Murray 11'; Quinn 46'; Wynalda 52' |

Rose Bowl, Pasadena
Attendance: 6,344
Referee: Arlington Success (Antigua and Barbuda)

July 3, 1991

| Trinidad and Tobago | 0–1 | Guatemala |
|---|---|---|
| | Report | Espel 89' |

Memorial Coliseum, Los Angeles
Attendance: 36,703
Referee: José Fuentes (Honduras)
July 3, 1991

| United States | 3–2 | Costa Rica |
|---|---|---|
| Vermes 6'; Pérez 49' (pen.); Marchena 59' (o.g.) | Report | Arguedas 30'; Jara 33' |

Memorial Coliseum, Los Angeles
Attendance: 36,703
Referee: Arturo Brizio Carter (Mexico)

== Knockout stage ==
In the knockout stage, if a match is level at the end of normal playing time, extra time is played (two periods of 15 minutes each), with each team being allowed to make a sixth substitution. If still tied after extra time, the match is decided by a penalty shoot-out.

=== Bracket ===
Semi-finals
July 5 — Los Angeles
Honduras | 2
Costa Rica | 0
July 5 — Los Angeles
United States | 2
Mexico | 0

Final
July 7 — Los Angeles
United States (p) | 0 (4)
Honduras | 0 (3)
Third place play-off
July 7 — Los Angeles
Mexico | 2
Costa Rica | 0

=== Semi-finals ===
July 5, 1991

| Honduras | 2–0 | Costa Rica |
|---|---|---|
| Bennett 37'; Flores 79' | Report |

Memorial Coliseum, Los Angeles
Attendance: 41,103
Referee: Arturo Angeles (United States)

July 5, 1991

| United States | 2–0 | Mexico |
|---|---|---|
| Doyle 48'; Vermes 64' | Report |

Memorial Coliseum, Los Angeles
Attendance: 41,103
Referee: José Carlos Ortiz (El Salvador)
Team details

| United States | Mexico |

| GK | 1 | Tony Meola |
| DF | 16 | John Doyle | (yellow card) 73' |
| DF | 17 | Marcelo Balboa |
| DF | 21 | Fernando Clavijo | | (substituted on) 83' |
| MF | 20 | Paul Caligiuri | (yellow card) 12' |
| MF | 14 | Brian Quinn |
| MF | 19 | Chris Henderson |
| MF | 7 | Hugo Perez |
| FW | 4 | Bruce Murray |
| FW | 10 | Peter Vermes (c) |
| FW | 11 | Eric Wynalda | | (substituted off) 71' |
Substitutes:
| DF | 2 | Steve Trittschuh |
| DF | 3 | Janusz Michallik |
| MF | 5 | Ted Eck | | (substituted on) 71' |
| DF | 8 | Dominic Kinnear |
| DF | 15 | Desmond Armstrong | | (substituted on) 83' |
| GK | 18 | Mark Dodd |
| DF | 22 | Bruce Savage |
Manager:
(Socialist Federal Republic of Yugoslavia) Velibor Milutinovic

| GK | 1 | Pablo Larios |
| RB | 2 | Juan Hernández |
| CB | 3 | Efraín Herrera |
| CB | 4 | Roberto Ruiz Esparza |
| LB | 5 | Héctor Esparza |
| RM | 8 | José Manuel de la Torre | (substituted off) 57' |
| CM | 6 | Carlos Muñoz (c) |
| CM | 11 | Gonzalo Farfán |
| LM | 10 | Benjamín Galindo | (substituted off) 83' |
| RF | 27 | Carlos Hermosillo |
| LF | 17 | Luís Roberto Alves |
Substitutes:
| GK | 12 | Adrián Chávez |
| LF | 13 | Paul Moreno |
| CB | 14 | Felix Cruz |
| LM | 15 | Missael Espinoza | (substituted on) 57' |
| RM | 16 | Jorge Dávalos |
| LB | 18 | Guillermo Muñoz |
| RF | 19 | Luis García | (substituted on) 83' |
Manager:
Manuel Lapuente

=== Third place play-off ===
July 7, 1991

| Mexico | 2–0 | Costa Rica |
|---|---|---|
| Farfán 9'; Galindo 89' | Report |

Memorial Coliseum, Los Angeles
Attendance: 39,873
Referee: Errol Forbes (Trinidad and Tobago)
Team details

| Mexico | Costa Rica |

| GK | 12 | Adrián Chávez |
| RB | 2 | Juan Hernández |
| CB | 3 | Efraín Herrera |
| CB | 14 | Felix Cruz |
| LB | 5 | Héctor Esparza |
| RM | 15 | Missael Espinoza |
| CM | 6 | Carlos Muñoz | (c) | (substituted off) 74' |
| CM | 11 | Gonzalo Farfán |
| LM | 10 | Benjamín Galindo |
| RF | 27 | Carlos Hermosillo |
| LF | 17 | Luís Roberto Alves |
Substitutes:
| GK | 1 | Pablo Larios |
| CB | 4 | Roberto Ruiz Esparza |
| RM | 8 | José Manuel de la Torre |
| LF | 13 | Paul Moreno |
| RM | 16 | Jorge Dávalos | | (substituted on) 74' |
| LB | 18 | Guillermo Muñoz |
| RF | 19 | Luis García |
Manager:
Luis Fernando Tena

| GK | 1 | Luis Gabelo Conejo |
| DF | 2 | Vladimir Quesada | | (substituted off) 19' |
| DF | 3 | Róger Flores (c) |
| DF | 4 | Rónald González | (yellow card) 31' |
| DF | 13 | Ricardo Chacón |
| DF | 6 | Héctor Marchena |
| MF | 12 | Austin Berry |
| MF | 10 | Óscar Ramírez | | (substituted off) 57' |
| MF | 16 | Floyd Guthrie |
| MF | 17 | Juan Carlos Arguedas |
| FW | 9 | Hernán Medford |
Substitutes:
| MF | 5 | Róger Gómez |
| FW | 7 | Claudio Jara | | (substituted on) 57' |
| MF | 8 | Carlos Velásquez | | (substituted on) 19' |
| FW | 11 | Leonidas Flores |
| FW | 14 | Norman Gómez |
| DF | 15 | Edwin Salazar |
| GK | 18 | Pedro Cubillo |
| DF | 20 | Mauricio Montero |
Manager:
Rolando Villalobos

=== Final ===
July 7, 1991

| Honduras | 0–0 (a.e.t.) | United States |
|---|---|---|
| | Report |
Penalties
| Castro (penalty scored); Anariba (penalty missed); Yearwood (penalty missed); Flores (penalty scored); Zapata (penalty missed); Cálix (penalty missed); Vallejo (penalty scored); Espinoza (penalty missed) | 3–4 | (penalty scored) Balboa; (penalty missed) Vermes; (penalty missed) Pérez; (penalty scored) Caligiuri; (penalty missed) Eck; (penalty missed) Quinn; (penalty scored) Kinnear; (penalty scored) Clavijo |

Memorial Coliseum, Los Angeles
Attendance: 39,873
Referee: Arturo Brizio Carter (Mexico)

1991 CONCACAF Gold Cup winners

United States
First title

== Statistics ==
=== Goalscorers ===
4 goals

- (Mexico) Benjamín Galindo

3 goals

- (Canada) Dale Mitchell
- (Honduras) Eduardo Bennett
- (Honduras) Luis Calix
- (Mexico) Carlos Hermosillo

2 goals

- (Honduras) Marco Antonio Anariba
- (Honduras) Eugenio Dolmo Flores
- (Jamaica) Roderick Reid
- (Trinidad and Tobago) Leonson Lewis
- (United States) Bruce Murray
- (United States) Peter Vermes

1 goal

- (Canada) John Limniatis
- (Canada) Jamie Lowery
- (Canada) Colin Miller
- (Costa Rica) Juan Carlos Arguedas
- (Costa Rica) Leonidas Flores
- (Costa Rica) Róger Gómez
- (Costa Rica) Claudio Jara
- (Costa Rica) Hernán Medford
- (Guatemala) Luis Espel
- (Honduras) Juan Carlos Espinoza
- (Honduras) Gilberto Yearwood
- (Jamaica) Hector Wright
- (Mexico) Luís Roberto Alves
- (Mexico) Gonzalo Farfán
- (Mexico) José Manuel de la Torre
- (Trinidad and Tobago) Alvin Thomas
- (United States) Marcelo Balboa
- (United States) John Doyle
- (United States) Hugo Pérez
- (United States) Brian Quinn
- (United States) Eric Wynalda

1 own goal

- (Costa Rica) Héctor Marchena (playing against the United States)

== Awards ==
| Golden Ball | Golden Boot |
|---|---|
| (United States) Tony Meola | (Mexico) Benjamín Galindo |

=== Team of the Tournament ===
Best XI by Soccer America
| Goalkeeper | Defenders | Midfielders | Forwards |
|---|---|---|---|
| (United States) Tony Meola | (Honduras) Marco Anariba (Honduras) Raúl Martínez Sambulá (United States) John Doyle (United States) Fernando Clavijo | (United States) Hugo Pérez (Honduras) Gilberto Yearwood (United States) Brian Quinn | (Honduras) Eduardo Bennett (Costa Rica) Hernán Medford (Honduras) Luis Cálix |
