= Luis Cálix =

Luis Cálix may refer to:

- Luis Cálix (footballer, born 1965), Honduran football midfielder
- Luis Cálix (soccer player, born 1988), American soccer defender and son of the Honduran footballer
