= Yearwood =

Yearwood is a surname. Notable people with the surname include:

- Barrington Yearwood (born 1986), Barbadian cricketer
- Gilberto Yearwood (born 1956), retired Honduran football player
- Jaylen Yearwood (born 2004), Trinidadian footballer
- Kathleen Yearwood (born 1958), Canadian experimental singer-songwriter and author
- Lennox Yearwood, minister, community activist, influential in Hip Hop political life
- Richard Yearwood (born 1970), English-Canadian voice-over artist, director, producer, and character actor
- Robin Yearwood, Antiguan politician and member of the Antigua Labour Party (ALP)
- Trisha Yearwood (born 1964), American country music artist
- Wayne Yearwood (born 1964), former professional and Olympic basketball player from Canada

== See also ==
- Earthwood, a brand of acoustic bass guitars
- Erwood, a village in Powys, Wales
- Harewood (surname)
- Harwood (disambiguation)
