= Yarwood =

Yarwood is a surname. Notable people with the surname include:

- Mike Yarwood (1941–2023), English impressionist, comedian, and actor
- Stephen Yarwood (born 1971), Australian politician

and

- W. J. Yarwood & Sons was a shipyard at Northwich, Cheshire from 1896 to 1966

== See also ==
- Harwood (name)
- Merton Yarwood Williams (1883–1974), Canadian geologist academic
- Yearwood
