= Harwood =

Harwood may refer to:

== Places ==
=== Australia ===
- Harwood, New South Wales

=== Canada ===
- Harwood, Ontario
- Harwood Island (British Columbia)

=== New Zealand ===
- Harwoods Hole
- Harwood, New Zealand

=== United Kingdom ===
- Harwood, County Durham
- Harwood, Greater Manchester
- Harwood Dale, North Yorkshire
- Great Harwood, Lancashire
- Little Harwood, Lancashire

=== United States ===
- Harwood, Indiana
- Harwood, Maryland
- Harwood, Missouri
- Harwood, North Dakota
- Harwood Center, Dallas
- Harwood Creek, California
- Harwood Hall, Durham, North Carolina
- Harwood Heights, Illinois
- Harwood Township, Champaign County, Illinois
- Harwood, Texas
- Harewood, West Virginia
- Mount Harwood in California

== Other uses ==
- Harwood (name)
- USS Harwood (DD-861), a US Navy destroyer
- Harwood's Gerbil
- The Harwood Butcher, fictional character in Grand Theft Auto
- Harwood Union High School, a high school in central Vermont, United States
- 7040 Harwood, asteroid

== See also ==
- Harewood (surname), typically pronounced 'Harwood', as a British surname
