= Arguedas =

Arguedas may refer to:

== People with the surname ==
- José María Arguedas (1911–1969), Peruvian novelist
- Alcides Arguedas (1879–1946), Bolivian writer and historian
- Juan Carlos Arguedas (born 1970), Costa Rican soccer player

== Places ==
- Arguedas, Navarre, a municipality located in the province and autonomous community of Navarre, northern Spain.
