= Róchez =

Róchez is a surname. Notable people with the surname include:

- Austin Rochez (born 1997), rapper under the name 645AR
- Bryan Róchez (born 1995), Honduran footballer
- Harrison Róchez (born 1995), Belizean footballer
- Jairo Róchez (born 1991), Honduran footballer
- Tomás Róchez (born 1964), retired Honduran footballer
