= Hywood =

Hywood is a surname. Notable people with the surname include:

- Greg Hywood (born 1954), Australian journalist
- Steve Hywood (born 1950), Australian rules footballer

== See also ==
- Haywood (surname)
