= Henwood =

Henwood may refer to:

- Henwood (surname)
- Henwood, Cornwall, England, a hamlet
- Henwood, Oxfordshire, England, a hamlet
