= Henwood (surname) =

Henwood is a surname. Notable people with the surname include:

- Berryman Henwood (1881–1955), justice of the Supreme Court of Missouri
- Casey Henwood (born 1980), New Zealand field hockey player
- Craig Henwood (born 1978), Australian sport shooter
- Dai Henwood (born 1978), New Zealand comedian
- Doug Henwood (born 1952), American journalist
- Larissa Henwood (born 1994), Brazil international rugby union player
- Megan Henwood (born 1987), English singer-songwriter
- Simon Henwood (born 1965), English artist and writer
- Wayne Henwood (born 1962), Australian rules footballer
- William Jory Henwood (1805–1875), British geologist

== See also ==
- Haywood (surname)
- Heawood
- Harwood (name)
