= Hugo Pérez =

Hugo Pérez may refer to:

- Hugo Pérez (soccer, born 1963), American international association football player
- Hugo Pérez (footballer, born 1968), Argentine international association football player
- Hugo Pérez (footballer, born 2002), Spanish footballer
