= Haywood (surname) =

Haywood is a surname. Notable people with the surname include:

- Adam Haywood (1875–1932), English footballer
- Bill Haywood (1869–1928), American union organizer
- Bill Haywood (baseball) (born 1937), American baseball player and coach
- Billy Haywood (1899–1977), English footballer
- Brendan Haywood (born 1979), American basketball player
- Chris Haywood, American actor and producer
- Dave Haywood (born 1982), American musician
- Eliza Haywood (1693–1756), English writer, actress and publisher
- Elizabeth Henry Haywood (1796–1840), American political hostess
- Esme Haywood (1900–1985), English cricketer
- Esther Haywood (1940–2024), American politician from Missouri
- Garfield Thomas Haywood (1880–1931), American pastor and songwriter
- Harry Haywood (1898–1985), American communist
- Hurley Haywood, American race-car driver
- John Haywood (disambiguation)
- Kate Haywood, English swimmer
- Kalan Haywood, American politician
- Leah Haywood, Australian pop rock singer
- Leon Haywood, American funk and soul singer
- Michael Haywood, American football coach
- Michelle Haywood, Manx politician
- Millard Haywood (1853–1911), American painter
- Nick Haywood, American jazz musician
- Nigel Haywood, British diplomat
- Pippa Haywood, English actress
- Sam Haywood, British pianist
- Spencer Haywood, American basketball player
- Sue Haywood, American mountain bike racer
- Ty Haywood (born 2006), American football player
- William Henry Haywood, Jr. (1801–1852), American politician

== Fictional ==
- Mirabelle Haywood, a.k.a. Aiko Senoo, a main character from the anime series Ojamajo Doremi (Magical DoReMi)

== See also ==
- Haywood (disambiguation)
- Harewood (surname)
- Harwood (name)
- Heawood
