= Billy Haywood =

English footballer

Personal information
- Full name: Johnson William Haywood
- Date of birth: 11 April 1899
- Place of birth: Eckington, England
- Date of death: 1977 (aged 77–78)
- Position: Winger

Senior career*
Years	Team	Apps	(Gls)
1920–1921	Eckington Works		
1922–1924	Chelsea	23	(2)
1924–1925	Halifax Town	1	(0)
1925–1926	Yeovil & Petters United		
1926	Portsmouth	0	(0)
1926–1927	Barrow	9	(1)
1927–1928	Weymouth		
1928–1929	Scunthorpe & Lindsey United		
1929–1930	Wombwell		
1930	Denaby United		
Total		33	(3)
- * Club domestic league appearances and goals

Johnson William Haywood (11 April 1899 – 1977) was an English footballer who played in the Football League for Barrow, Chelsea and Halifax Town.
