= José Manuel de la Torre =

Mexican footballer and manager (born 1965)

Personal information
- Full name: José Manuel de la Torre Menchaca
- Date of birth: 13 November 1965 (age 60)
- Place of birth: Guadalajara, Jalisco, Mexico
- Height: 1.79 m (5 ft 10 1/2 in)
- Position: Attacking midfielder

Youth career
- Guadalajara

Senior career*
Years	Team	Apps	(Gls)
1984–1988	Guadalajara	116	(7)
1988–1989	Real Oviedo	32	(8)
1989–1991	Puebla	82	(15)
1991–1993	Cruz Azul	56	(17)
1993–1995	Guadalajara	55	(12)
1995–1996	Tigres UANL	25	(3)
1996	Puebla	9	(0)
1997–1999	Necaxa	40	(1)
Total		415	(63)

International career
1987–1992	Mexico	28	(6)

Managerial career
- 2001–2005: America (Assistant)
- 2005–2007: Guadalajara
- 2008–2010: Toluca
- 2010–2013: Mexico
- 2014–2015: Guadalajara
- 2016–2017: Santos Laguna
- 2020: Toluca
- 2024: Puebla
Medal record
Representing Mexico
Third place	CONCACAF Gold Cup	1991
- * Club domestic league appearances and goals

José Manuel de la Torre Menchaca (born 13 November 1965), popularly nicknamed Chepo, is a Mexican former professional footballer and a manager. As a player, de la Torre played as an attacking midfielder.

== Playing career ==
"Chepo" came up through the Chivas youth academies, and was an important player for all the teams he played for. He had a short stint in Europe with Spanish club Real Oviedo, where he played 32 games and scored 8 goals. He became champion with Chivas in the 1986 season defeating Cruz Azul in the Estadio Jalisco. He also played at Puebla, Cruz Azul, Tigres UANL during the 1995–96 season, and Necaxa. De la Torre was also called up for the Mexico national team on various occasions, but unfortunately he was never called for a FIFA World Cup.

== Career statistics ==
=== International goals ===
#	Date	Venue	Opponent	Score	Result	Competition
1.	June 30, 1991	Los Angeles Memorial Coliseum, Los Angeles, United States	Canada	2–0	3–1	1991 CONCACAF Gold Cup
2.	December 4, 1991	Estadio León, Leon, Mexico	Hungary	3–0	3–0	Friendly
3.	March 8, 1992	Estadio Azulgrana, Mexico City, Mexico	CIS	2–0	4–0	Friendly
4.	October 7, 1992	Los Angeles Memorial Coliseum, Los Angeles, United States	El Salvador	1–0	2–0	Friendly
5.	November 15, 1992	Estadio Azulgrana, Mexico City, Mexico	Honduras	1–0	2–0	1994 FIFA World Cup qualification
6.	November 22, 1992	Estadio Azulgrana, Mexico City, Mexico	Costa Rica	4–0	4–0	1994 FIFA World Cup qualification

== Managerial career ==
=== Guadalajara ===
On December 10, 2006, Guadalajara won their eleventh league championship, making de la Torre the youngest coach to win a championship in the last decade at age 40 years & 27 days, and making Guadalajara the club with the most titles in the Primera División de México (their record would later be surpassed by América in 2014) (then again in 2018).

=== Toluca ===
In mid 2008, de la Torre became the coach of Toluca. In the beginning of the season Toluca had a relatively weak start, but improved as the season progressed, finishing with a five-game non-losing streak and taking 13 out of 15 points. They then went on to win the tournament.

He won his second championship with Toluca in 2010, defeating Santos in a penalty shoot-out where Toluca came back from a 1–3 deficite to win the penalty shoot out 4–3.

=== Mexico national team ===
On October 18, 2010, it was announced that de la Torre would become the new manager of Mexico national team at the end of the 2010 Torneo Apertura. He made his debut as Mexico's manager on February 9, 2011, in a friendly match against Bosnia and Herzegovina, which Mexico won 2–0. De la Torre's first tournament as Mexico's manager was the 2011 CONCACAF Gold Cup. His first game of the tournament was on June 8, 2011, against El Salvador which Mexico won 5–0. The Mexican team won all three of their group stage matches. De la Torre's Mexico team would go undefeated throughout the tournament, winning all six of their games and eventually defeated the United States 4–2 in the final. De la Torre's first defeat as Mexico's manager came on October 11, 2011, in a friendly against Brazil, who came back and won 1–2.

On June 16, 2013, Mexico faced Italy and lost 1–2 in their first match of the 2013 Confederations Cup. The only goal scored by Mexico in the game was scored by Javier Hernández via a penalty kick. The Mexican team's performance was criticized, with the team lacking creativity, offensive spark, and a poor display in the midfield during most of the match, frequently giving away the ball to Italian opposition. This resulted in many people to question De la Torre's future as the manager of the team. On June 19, 2013, after a 2–0 loss to Brazil and Italy defeating Japan 4–3, Mexico was knocked out in the group stage of the Confederations Cup, the team did manage to defeat Japan in their last match of the tournament.

In their first group match of the 2013 CONCACAF Gold Cup, Mexico lost 1–2 to Panama. Mexico eventually won the last two group games against Canada and Martinique and ended second in Group A. After defeating Trinidad and Tobago in the quarter-finals they were eliminated by Panama in the semi-finals, missing the final for the first time since 2005.

In the qualifiers for the 2014 World Cup the national team fared poorly, only managing to win one out of seven games and scoring a total of only 4 goals during those games. Mexico's were not able to defeat such as Jamaica, Costa Rica, Honduras, and Panama at home. Observers marveled at Mexico's "unprecedented collapse" under de la Torre, considering the fact that Mexico had won the gold medal in the most recent Olympic Games and had talented players in Giovani Dos Santos and Javier Hernández. On September 6, Mexico lost to Honduras at the Estadio Azteca. The defeat was Mexico's second loss at home in 77 qualifying matches.

After the loss to Honduras, de la Torre stated that his development "project" of the national team was going "very well." The Mexican press branded the national team as the "ratones verdes", or "green mice", and noted that Mexico was in danger of not qualifying to the World Cup for the first time in over two decades.

On September 7, 2013, Jose Manuel de la Torre was fired as coach of the national team by Femexfut president Justino Compean, ending his two-year tenure at the helm.

=== Return to Guadalajara ===
On October 8, 2014, Jose Manuel de la Torre was hired as coach for 2nd time to Guadalajara. The club started the 2015 season with a 2–1 loss against Chiapas, and this result caused them to become tied in the last position of the Liga MX relegation table with Puebla. The very next week the club showed better character after a 2–1 win at home against Pumas UNAM in front of a very supportful, sold-out crowd of fans. By game 12 of the 2015 Clausura season, Guadalajara managed to earn 21 points after winning crucial matches against teams such as Monterrey and relegation rivals Puebla. José Manuel de la Torre's strategic 4-2-3-1 formation proved effect during matches despite the fans' constant requests to use two strikers in the starting line-up. In game 13 of the season, Guadalajara defeated Club León in the Estadio Omnilife's 100th official match and went up to 1st place with 24 points. José Manuel de la Torre's effectiveness rose to 62.1%, the highest rate in the Clausura 2015 season. The club finished the 2015 Clausura in fifth place with a total of 26 points, along with the third best defense of the season, thus, qualifying to the playoffs for the first time since 2012. Guadalajara was able to make it to the quarterfinals, they faced rivals Atlas. The first match ended in a 0–0 draw. Second match was a 4–1 win over Atlas, with a hat-trick from Marco Fabian advancing to the semi-final, facing Santos Laguna. In the second match of the semi-finals, Guadalajara fell short losing to Santos Laguna in a 3–0 loss, failing to advance to the finals. After a rough start during the 2015 Apertura season, the club controversially sacked De la Torre.

== Honours ==
=== Player ===
Guadalajara

- Mexican Primera División: 1986–87

Puebla

- Mexican Primera División: 1989–90

Necaxa

- Mexican Primera División: Invierno 1998

Individual

- Mexican Primera División Best Rookie: 1986–87
- Mexican Primera División Best Midfielder: 1989–90

=== Manager ===
Guadalajara

- Mexican Primera División: Apertura 2006

Toluca

- Mexican Primera División: Apertura 2008, Bicentenario 2010

Mexico

- CONCACAF Gold Cup: 2011

Individual

- Mexican Primera División Best Manager: Apertura 2006, Apertura 2008, Bicentenario 2010
- Tecate Premios Deportes Best Manager: 2009
