= Harewood (surname) =

Harewood is a surname. Notable persons with that surname include:

- Adrian Harewood, Canadian broadcaster
- David Harewood (born 1965), British actor
- Dorian Harewood (born 1950), American actor
- Marlon Harewood (born 1979), English footballer

== See also ==
- Earl of Harewood, a title in Peerage of the United Kingdom
- George Henry Hubert Lascelles, 7th Earl of Harewood, the previous holder of the Earldom
- Mary, Princess Royal and Countess of Harewood
- Haywood (surname)
- Heawood
- Harwood (name)
