= Carlos Muñoz (Mexican footballer) =

Mexican footballer and manager (born 1959)

Personal information
- Full name: Carlos Eduardo Muñoz Remolina
- Date of birth: 8 September 1959 (age 67)
- Place of birth: San Luis Potosí, Mexico
- Height: 1.83 m (6 ft 0 in)
- Position: Midfielder

Senior career*
Years	Team	Apps	(Gls)
1979–1982	Atlético Potosino	83	(29)
1982–1995	Tigres UANL	365	(2)
Total		448	(31)

International career
1981	Mexico U20	3	(0)
1983–1991	Mexico	56	(2)

Managerial career
- 1998–2009: Tigres UANL (assistant)
Medal record
Representing Mexico
Third place	CONCACAF Gold Cup	1991
- * Club domestic league appearances and goals

Carlos Eduardo Muñoz Remolina (born 8 September 1959), popularly nicknamed "El Internacional" (The International), “El Pierna Fuerte” (The Strong Leg), “El Tigre Mayor” (The Chief Tiger), and “Carlitos", is a Mexican former professional footballer, who played as a midfielder and was also a member of the Mexico national team (Spanish: Selección de fútbol de México). Muñoz was the assistant manager at Tigres UANL for 11 years.

== Personal life ==
His personal life is in order and as an example, he was an Industrial Engineer and Christian, Carlos Reinoso has expressed his gratitude to Muñoz, at a stage of his life, supported and persuaded him to become a Christian.

== Playing career ==
Carlos Muñoz arrived at Tigres de la UANL in the 1982-1983 season. He was considered one of the best midfielders in Mexico, and remained there until the arrival of Carlos de los Cobos, who began to take his place for the Mexico national team in 1985. A reference, a symbol, an icon, an asset, a franchise player, who defended the colors of Tigres de la UANL in all areas and all forms, Muñoz was respected by his peers and feared by his rivals.

=== Mexico ===
Muñoz began his international career playing in the 1981 FIFA World Youth Championship in Australia, where Mexico national team finished third in their group. Muñoz played in all three matches 0-1 West Germany national team, 1-1 Spain U-20 national team, and 3-3 Egypt U-20 national team).

Muñoz played in the 1986 FIFA World Cup for Mexico national team, facing Belgium national team and Paraguay national team in Group B. Muñoz also played in the Round of 16 match against Bulgaria national team where Mexico won 2-0. His last match of the World Cup was against West Germany national team where Mexico national team fell 4-1 in penalties in the quarter-finals.

== Career statistics ==
=== International goals ===
#	Date	Venue	Opponent	Score	Result	Competition
1.	October 31, 1984	Uruguay	Uruguay	1–1	Draw	Friendly
2.	January 17, 1990	United States	Argentina	2–0	Win	Friendly

== Management career ==
After retiring as a player, he took up managing, becoming the assistant manager for Tigres de la UANL in 1998 and remaining there until 2009.
