= Juan Hernández (footballer, born 1965) =

Mexican footballer

Personal information
- Full name: Juan Hernández Ramírez
- Date of birth: 8 March 1965 (age 61)
- Place of birth: Mexico City, Mexico
- Position: Defender

Senior career*
| Years | Team | Apps | (Gls) |
| 1983–1988 | Club Necaxa | 129 | (2) |
| 1988–1996 | Club América | 236 | (11) |
| 1996–1998 | Atlante F.C. | 51 | (5) |
| 1997–1999 | Club América | 24 | (2) |
| 1998–2000 | C.F. Monterrey | 19 | (0) |
| 1999–2000 | Atlante F.C. | 5 | (0) |

International career
| 1987–1993 | Mexico | 36 | (2) |
Medal record
Representing Mexico
| Runner-up | Copa America | 1993 |
| Third place | CONCACAF Gold Cup | 1991 |
- * Club domestic league appearances and goals

Juan Hernández Ramírez (born 8 March 1965) is a Mexican former professional footballer who played as a defender. He obtained a total number of 36 caps for the Mexico national team between 1987 and 1993, and was a squad member at the 1993 Copa América.

He made his debut on March 17, 1987. In 2009, during the Club América 93rd anniversary, Hernández Ramírez was inducted into the players hall of fame for being considered a talented player throughout the 1980s and 1990s although his league titles were limited to 1987-1988 and the 1988-1989 championships.

== Honours ==
Mexico

- Copa América runner-up: 1993
