= Roderick Reid =

Jamaican footballer (born 1970)

Personal information
- Date of birth: 10 January 1970 (age 56)
- Positions: Midfielder; forward

College career
Years	Team	Apps	(Gls)
1990–1993	Tiffin Dragons		

International career^{‡}
1996	Jamaica U23	3	(0)
1991–1996	Jamaica	37	(8)
- ‡ National team caps and goals as of 2 November 2026

Roderick Reid (born 10 January 1970) is a Jamaican former professional footballer who played as a midfielder or forward.

== Career statistics ==
=== International ===
National team	Year	Apps	Goals
Jamaica	1991	7	4
Jamaica	1992	9	2
Jamaica	1993	5	0
Jamaica	1994	1	0
Jamaica	1995	1	0
Jamaica	1996	1	0
Total		24	6

=== International goals ===
Scores and results list Jamaica's goal tally first.

No	Date	Venue	Opponent	Score	Result	Competition
1.	24 May 1991	Independence Park, Kingston, Jamaica	Guyana	4–0	6–0	1991 Caribbean Cup
2.	30 May 1991	Independence Park, Kingston, Jamaica	Saint Lucia	2–0	2–0	1991 Caribbean Cup
3.	28 June 1991	LA Memorial Coliseum, Los Angeles, California, United States	Mexico	1–2	1–4	1991 CONCACAF Gold Cup
4.	3 July 1991	LA Memorial Coliseum, Los Angeles, California, United States	Canada	2–3	2–3	1991 CONCACAF Gold Cup
5.	24 June 1992	Trinidad and Tobago	Martinique	1–0	3–2	1992 Caribbean Cup
6.	8 November 1992	Independence Park, Kingston, Jamaica	Bermuda	2–0	3–2	1994 FIFA World Cup qualification
