= Luis Cálix (soccer, born 1988) =

American soccer player

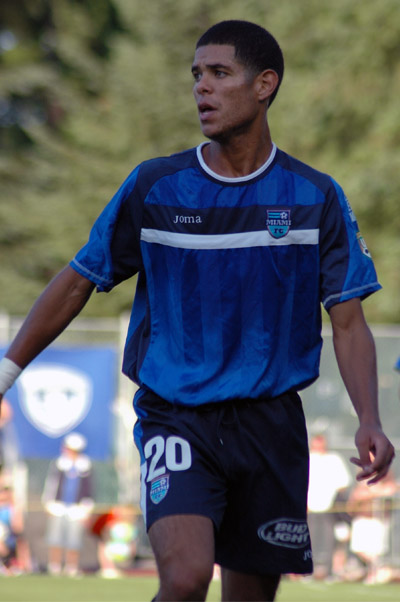

Personal information
- Full name: Luis Gustavo Cálix
- Date of birth: May 6, 1988 (age 38)
- Place of birth: Miami, Florida, United States
- Height: 6 ft 1 in (1.85 m)
- Position: Defender

Team information
- Current team: Parrillas One

Senior career*
| Years | Team | Apps | (Gls) |
| 2007–2012 | Miami FC | 14 | (1) |
| 2013–2016 | Parrillas One | 63 | (3) |
| 2017 – | Puerto Rico Bayamón | 5 | (1) |
- * Club domestic league appearances and goals as of 2 October 2008

Luis Gustavo Cálix (born May 6, 1988, in Miami, Florida) is an American soccer player, currently playing for Parrillas One in the Honduran national league.

He has been called one of Miami FC's youngest prospects from Kendall SC. In high school Calix played for Gulliver Preparatory School.

== Personal life ==
Cálix is the son of the Honduran football manager and former footballer Luis Enrique Cálix.
