= Harwood (name) =

Harwood is both a surname and occasional given name. Notable people with the name include:

Surname

- Harwood (surname)

Given name

- Harwood Greenhalgh (1849–1922), English footballer
- Sir Harwood Harrison (1907–1980), British politician
- Harwood Jarvis (1884–1936), Australian cricketer
- Harwood Sturtevant (1888–1977), American bishop
- Harwood Williams (born 1970), Kittitian cricketer

== See also ==
- Harewood (surname)
- Haywood (surname)
- Henwood (surname)
- Heawood
