= Barrington Gaynor =

Jamaican footballer (1965-2011)

Personal information
- Full name: Barrington Leslie Gaynor
- Date of birth: 27 September 1965
- Place of birth: Kingston, Jamaica
- Date of death: 19 March 2011 (aged 45)
- Place of death: Mount Pleasant, United States
- Position: Defender

Youth career
- 1978–1984: Camperdown

Senior career*
Years	Team	Apps	(Gls)
1980–1983	Bull Bay		
1983–1988	Harbour View		
1988–1992	Battlers		
1992–1993	Bull Bay		

International career^{‡}
1987–1993	Jamaica	63	(?)

Managerial career
- 1993–1995: Crusaders (assistant)
- 1999–2000: Bull Bay
- 2001: Harbour View
- 2001–2003: Bull Bay
- 2004: Jamaica U-23 (assistant)
- 2005–2006: Harbour View
- 2006–2007: Waterhouse
- * Club domestic league appearances and goals as of 9 April 2011 ‡ National team caps and goals as of 9 April 2011

Barrington Gaynor (27 September 1965 – 19 March 2011) was a Jamaican football player and manager. He earned 63 caps with the Jamaica men's national football team, including at the 1991 CONCACAF Gold Cup and 1993 CONCACAF Gold Cup.

== Early years ==
Gaynor lived in Trenchtown, Kingston, Jamaica, until he was nine years old. He attended Trench Town Primary School up until grade four. After moving to 9 Miles Bull Bay, St. Andrew in May 1975, Gaynor immediately transferred to St. Benedict's Primary School at 7 Miles Bull Bay. He started learning to play football at eleven years old. While learning to play football on the streets, Gaynor was given the nickname Cobra by one of his friends, who just felt like giving him a name. He played his first competition in the summer of 1977. It was the Bull Bay under fifteen Corner League where his team, Lodge United, was the eventual champion.

== Education ==
In 1978, Gaynor took the Common Entrance Exam at St. Benedict's Primary School, passed and went to Camperdown High School where he did well. At Camperdown he played Pepsi Under 13 in 1978 and went to the finals. In 1979 and 1980, Gaynor played Colts Under 15 and lost in the 1979 Colts final. He went on to play in the High School Manning Cup competition from 1981 to 1984. Camperdown won the Manning Cup, Walker Cup, and Olivier Shield in 1982. From 1982 to 1984 Gaynor was selected to the All Manning team at the end of each season. In 1984, Gaynor was named footballer of the year at Camperdown High School. In 2003 and 2004 he won the Jamaica High School Alumni Competition in Bronx New York, representing his Alma Mater.

In 1988 Gaynor was awarded a four-year football scholarship in the United States of America at Alderson Broaddus College in Philippi, West Virginia. Gaynor studied Computer Science and graduated in three and a half years with a Bachelor of Science degree. In 1988 Alderson Broaddus College were beaten in finals of the NAIA National Tournament and lost in semifinals of the tournament in 1991. Alderson Broaddus were the area champions in 1988 and 1991 and conference champions in 1988, 1990, and 1991. Gaynor made the All-American and All-Conference teams in the four years he played in college. He was also selected to the 1988 NAIA National All-Tournament Team. He was selected for the NAIA 1992 Senior Bowl game Chicago.

== Club career ==
At the age of fifteen, immediately after helping the minor league team to the semifinal, Gaynor started playing senior football in the major league competition for Bull Bay F.C. In 1983, Gaynor made his big career move at the age of eighteen when he joined neighboring Club Harbour View. Gaynor played for Harbour View F.C. for eighteen years, where he won many championships. While representing Harbour View with some excellent performance, Gaynor was given the nickname Cabrini, who was the Italian left full back from the 1982 World Cup winning team. While playing for Harbour View F.C., Gaynor won two major leagues, one President Cup, four Jackie Bell Knockouts, three Federation Cup Knockouts, three Premier League End of Round Finals and one Premier League Title. In year 1985, Gaynor was named the Most Valuable Junior Player in the Premier League and in 1998 Gaynor was voted the Most Valuable Player in the Federation Cup Knockout.

== International career ==
Gaynor got his first taste of national recognition when he was selected into the Jamaica National Under 19 Team in 1983. In 1987, Gaynor moved on to make his senior National debut. Gaynor played for his nation until 1993 and earned 63 caps. He represented his country in 13 FIFA World Cup qualification matches. In 1991, he was appointed vice captain of the national team and was given the opportunity to lead the team on many of occasions. During his tenure as a national player, Gaynor was dubbed by one reporter as "the man who doesn't know how to play a bad game". With the Jamaica National team, Gaynor won the Caribbean Shell Cup in 1991 and came third in the CONCACAF Gold Cup in 1993.

== Coaching career ==
Gaynor started his coaching career at a very tender age when he coached his championship Under 10 team while he was only twelve years old. He also coached and picked his primary school soccer team when the coach did not show up. In 1993 Gaynor got his first real coaching job, when he was hired as the assistant men's football coach for two years at William Carey College in Mississippi.

After his two-year coaching stint in Mississippi, he immediately went back to his beloved home in Jamaica, to work and continue his coaching career. In 1995, he coached his former high school team, Camperdown, in the Manning Cup competition and continued to coach them until 2007. Camperdown made it to the Walker Cup Finals in 2005 and Manning Cup Semifinals in 2000 and 2005.

Gaynor took over the coaching job at Bull Bay F.C. in 1999 and won the Syd Barlett Competition undefeated. Gaynor went on to be named Kingston and St. Andrew Football Association coach of the year in 2000. The following year Gaynor's Bull Bay team's hard work paid off again when they were awarded the Major League champions. In 2001, Gaynor transferred from Harbour View and went back to Bull Bay where he becomes a player coach. The Bull Bay team came second in the National A League competition and was promoted to the Premier League for the 2002/03 season. Bull Bay is the only team to ever got promoted three consecutive year on their way up to the Premier League.

In 2004 Gaynor got a coaching stint with the National Program, and travelled to Chengdu, China as an assistant coach to Wendell Downswell with the Jamaica Under 23 team. In the 2005/2006 season, he was assistant coach to Donovan Hayles at Harbour View for the Premier League. In July 2006, Gaynor went to England to complete the UEFA B Coaching course for a month. On his return from England, he coached Waterhouse F.C. in the 2006/2007 Premier League season.

== Honors ==
In April 2008, Gaynor was inducted into the Alderson Broaddus College Hall of Fame. He was the second football player to be inducted into the Hall of Fame at Alderson Broaddus College.

In February 2009 Gaynor was honored by Camperdown High School at the Camperdown Classic Track Meet.

On 18 July 2009 he received a Special Harbour View Honor in Marimar, Florida and that day was also declared by the Marimar Mayor as Barrington Gaynor's day.

== Personal life ==
Gaynor was married to Nyoka, and he had two daughters, Shanice, 16 and Juanell.

Gaynor started a College Scholarship Program immediately after his first year at Alderson Broaddus College in 1989. He got various colleges to give young football players, both boys and girls from Jamaica, a full four- or two-year scholarship. This scholarship program still goes on.

The Barrington Gaynor Foundation kept its first Back To School Treat in 2007 at his home in 9 Miles Bull Bay, where they cater for 1,000 children in the community, and this was held again in 2008. They also donated $100,000 in August 2008 and $150,000 in October 2009 to the Weise Road Basic School. He did this because he was a strong believer in education and the need to give back to his community.

=== Lou Gehrig's disease ===
Gaynor was diagnosed with Amyotrophic lateral sclerosis (ALS) or Lou Gehrig's disease in January 2008. In August 2008 a benefit match featuring George Weah was held for him in New York City. On 27 February 2011, Gaynor was honoured and handed several donations to facilitate medical expenses while he attended a Jamaica National Premier League match between Harbour View and Boys' Town.

=== Death ===
Gaynor died on 19 March 2011, while receiving medical treatment at the Westchester Medical Center, New York, U.S.A.

He was buried on 9 April at the Dovecot Memorial Park in St Catherine after a memorial service was held at the Pentecostal Tabernacle.
