= Carlo Marini =

Canadian soccer player

Personal information
- Date of birth: 11 May 1972 (age 54)
- Position: Goalkeeper

International career
Years	Team	Apps	(Gls)
1990	Canada U20	1	(0)
1991	Canada	1	(0)

Carlo Marini (born 11 May 1972) is a Canadian former international soccer player, born in Vancouver, who participated at the 1991 CONCACAF Gold Cup. He made his international debut on 28 June 1991 against Honduras as a 28th-minute substitute for goalkeeper Craig Forrest, who was sent off. Marini conceded four goals and Canada lost the game by a 4–2 scoreline. He played for the Vancouver 86ers in the CSL from 1989 to 1990.
