= Héctor Marchena =

Costa Rican footballer (born 1965)

Personal information
- Full name: Héctor Marchena de la O
- Date of birth: 4 January 1965 (age 61)
- Place of birth: Limón, Costa Rica
- Height: 1.78 m (5 ft 10 in)
- Positions: Defender; holding midfielder

Youth career
- 1983–1986: Cartaginés

Senior career*
Years	Team	Apps	(Gls)
1987–1992	Cartaginés		
1992–1996	Herediano		
1996	Turrialba		
1999	Ramonense		
2000	Cartaginés		

International career
1987–1994	Costa Rica	48	(0)
- * Club domestic league appearances and goals

Héctor Marchena de la O (born 4 January 1965 in Limón) is a former Costa Rican football player who used to play for Cartaginés and Herediano.

== Club career ==
Nicknamed La Iguana (The Lizard), Marchena made his professional debut for Cartaginés in 1987 and left them for Herediano ahead of the 1992-93 season. In June 1996 he moved to Turrialba, but a knee injury cut short his career in October 1996.

In December 1998 he left his post as an administrative assistant at the Banco Popular to resume his career with Ramonense. A year later he returned to Cartagines.

Como jugador de préstamo en el Deportivo Sapissa marco un gol de cabeza contra La Antigua URSS en 1989

== International career ==
Marchena made his debut for Costa Rica in a February 1987 friendly match against South Korea and earned a total of 48 caps, scoring no goals. He represented his country in 13 FIFA World Cup qualification matches and was part of the national team squad, that played in the 1990 FIFA World Cup in Italy, and featured in all four games played. He also played at the 1991 UNCAF Nations Cup and the 1991 CONCACAF Gold Cup.

He played his last international on January 19, 1994 against Norway.

== Personal life ==
Marchena is married and has six children. He worked for the Banco Popular and Recope.
