= Pablo Larios =

Mexican footballer (1960–2019)

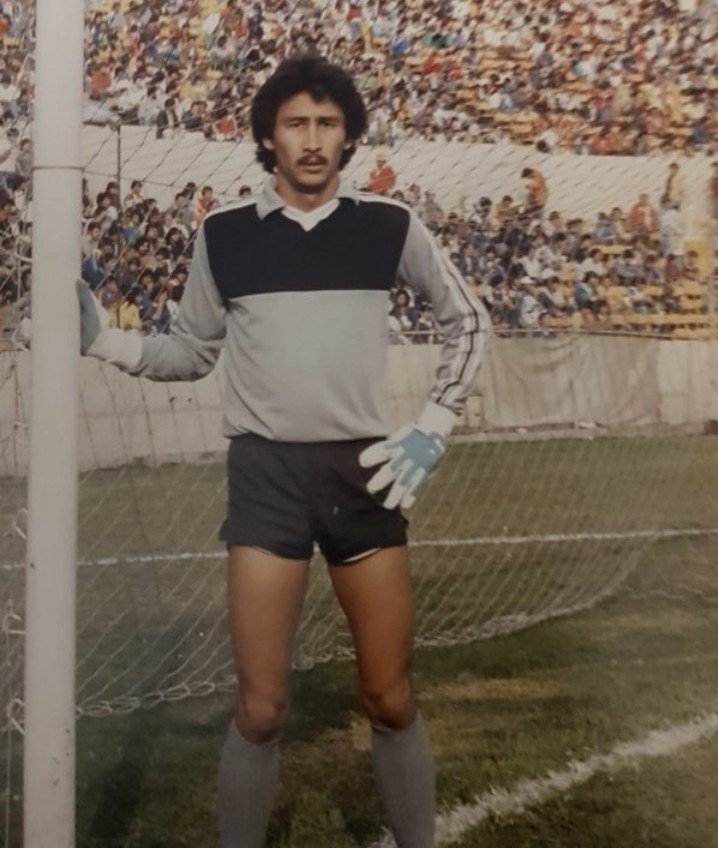

Personal information
- Full name: Pablo Larios Iwasaki
- Date of birth: July 31, 1960
- Place of birth: Zacatepec, Morelos, Mexico
- Date of death: January 31, 2019 (aged 58)
- Place of death: Puebla, Mexico
- Height: 1.79 m (5 ft 10 1/2 in)
- Position: Goalkeeper

Senior career*
Years	Team	Apps	(Gls)
1980–1984	Zacatepec	76	(0)
1984–1989	Cruz Azul	138	(0)
1989–1994	Puebla	198	(0)
1994–1997	Toros Neza	105	(0)
1997	Zacatepec	0	(0)
1998–1999	Toros Neza	22	(0)
Total		539	(0)

International career
1983–1991	Mexico	48	(0)
Medal record
Representing Mexico
Third place	CONCACAF Gold Cup	1991
- * Club domestic league appearances and goals

Pablo Larios Iwasaki (Japanese: パブロ・ラリオス・イワサキ, July 31, 1960 – January 31, 2019) was a Mexican professional footballer who played as a goalkeeper. He was nicknamed "El Arquero de la Selva" (The Goalkeeper of the Jungle), both for being from Zacatepec, a town in the Mexican state of Morelos known for his humid and warm climate, and for starting his career with his hometown's football club.

== Career ==
Larios was a goalkeeper for Zacatepec, Cruz Azul, Puebla and Toros Neza during his playing career. He played for the Mexico national football team at the 1986 FIFA World Cup, where Mexico reached the quarter-finals and 1991 CONCACAF Gold Cup. He also participated in the 1979 FIFA World Youth Championship.

He was the goalkeeper trainer in the 2006 FIFA World Cup working for Ricardo Lavolpe.

== Personal life ==
He has Japanese ancestors on his maternal side.

In early September 2008, Larios's 19-year-old son, Pablo Larios Garza, was reported missing. After an intense search, he was found dead by the border police near the area of Grajeno, approximately 600 feet away from Rio Grande. He attempted to illegally cross the border to visit his girlfriend, who lived in the US, since he had lost his visa.

=== Death ===
On January 31, 2019, Larios was pronounced dead at a hospital in Puebla at the age of 58. The former goalkeeper had been admitted to hospital due to an intestinal occlusion and respiratory arrest, for which he underwent surgery from which he did not survive.

== Honours ==
Zacatepec

- Mexican Segunda División: 1983–84

Puebla

- Mexican Primera División: 1989–90
- Copa México: 1989–90
- Campeón de Campeones: 1989–90
- CONCACAF Champions' Cup: 1991

== See also ==
- List of people from Morelos
