= Efraín Herrera =

Mexican footballer (born 1959)

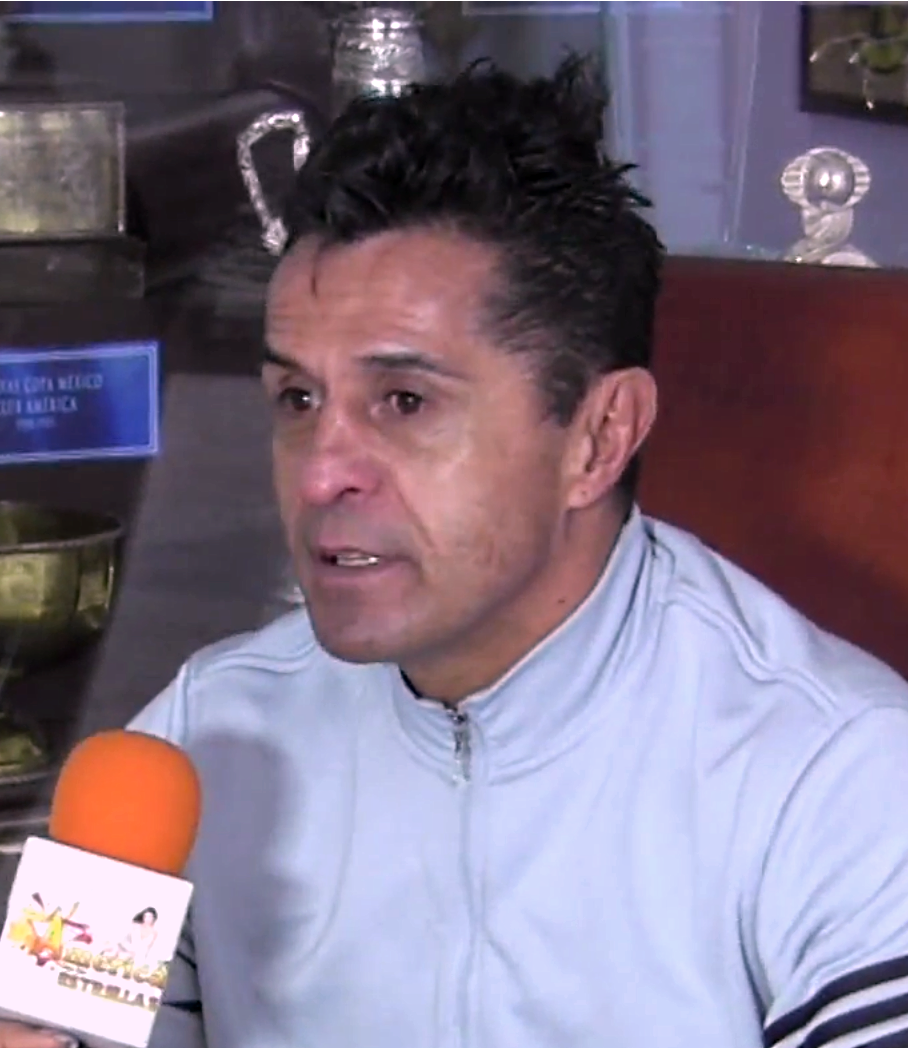

Personal information
- Full name: Efraín Herrera González
- Date of birth: 28 September 1959 (age 67)
- Place of birth: Mexico City, Mexico
- Height: 1.76 m (5 ft 9 in)
- Position: Defender

Senior career*
Years	Team	Apps	(Gls)
1978–1981	Unión de Curtidores	92	(1)
1981–1985	Atlas	56	(2)
1985–1989	América	93	(0)
1989–1995	Necaxa	208	(1)
1995–1996	Toluca	26	(0)
1996–1998	Pachuca	11	(0)

International career
1980–1991	Mexico	11	(0)
Medal record
Representing Mexico
Third place	CONCACAF Gold Cup	1991
- * Club domestic league appearances and goals

Efraín Herrera González (born 28 September 1959) is a Mexican former football defender who played for 20 years in the Mexican Primera División and represented the Mexico national team.

== Career ==
Born in Mexico City, Herrera was a product of the Unión de Curtidores youth system and made his club debut in 1978. He spent most of his career with Club Necaxa, where he won the league title twice. At the end of his career, he joined C.F. Pachuca in the Primera A División and helped the club gain promotion before he retired in 1998. Overall, Herrera had a 20-year career and made over 450 Mexican Primera División appearances with Unión de Curtidores, Club Atlas, Club América, Club Necaxa, Deportivo Toluca F.C. and C.F. Pachuca.

He represented Mexico at the 1991 CONCACAF Gold Cup finals.

After he retired from playing, Herrera became a football coach. He was assistant to Juan Antonio Luna at Club Tijuana during 2009 and 2010.
