= Tomás Róchez =

Honduran footballer (born 1964)

Personal information
- Full name: Tomás Róchez Miguel
- Date of birth: 1 October 1964 (age 62)
- Place of birth: Santa Fe, Honduras
- Position: Defender

Senior career*
Years	Team	Apps	(Gls)
1987–1988	Marathón		
1990–1991	Santos Laguna	10	(0)
1993–1994	Petrotela		

International career
1991–1994	Honduras	25	(1)
- * Club domestic league appearances and goals

Tomás Róchez Miguel (born 1 October 1964) is a retired Honduran football player who made his name with the national team in the early 1990s.

== Club career ==
Róchez played for Marathón, Olimpia, Tela Timsa and had a short spell at Mexican side Santos Laguna alongside compatriot Luis Enrique Cálix.

== International career ==
Róchez made his debut for Honduras in a June 1991 CONCACAF Gold Cup match against Jamaica and has earned a total of 25 caps, scoring 1 goal. He has represented his country in 6 FIFA World Cup qualification matches and played at the 1993 UNCAF Nations Cup, as well as at the 1991, and 1993 CONCACAF Gold Cups.

His final international was a June 1994 friendly match against South Korea.

=== International goals ===
Scores and results list Honduras' goal tally first.

N.	Date	Venue	Opponent	Score	Result	Competition
1.	27 January 1993	Lima, Peru	Peru	1–1	1-1	Friendly match

== Honours and awards ==
=== Country ===
Honduras

- Copa Centroamericana (1): 1993,
