= Jamie Lowery =

Canadian soccer player (born 1961)

Personal information
- Full name: James Matthew Lowery
- Date of birth: January 15, 1961 (age 65)
- Place of birth: Port Alberni, British Columbia
- Position: Midfielder

Youth career
- Coulson-Prescott F.C.

Senior career*
Years	Team	Apps	(Gls)
1987–1992	Vancouver 86ers	112	

International career^{‡}
1986–1991	Canada	20	(1)
Medal record
Representing Canada
Men's Association football
North American Nations Cup
Winner	1990 Canada
Third place	1991 United States
- * Club domestic league appearances and goals as of 27 June 2009 ‡ National team caps and goals as of 27 June 2009

James Matthew Lowery (born January 15, 1961) is a former professional soccer player from Canada.

== Club career ==
Born in Port Alberni on Vancouver Island, Lowery joined the Coulson-Prescott Football Club. A midfielder, Lowery played for the University of Victoria and after graduation also played club soccer for the Canadian Soccer League team, the Vancouver 86ers.

== International career ==
Lowery was a member of Canada's Olympic team which failed to qualify for the 1988 Summer Olympics, making one appearance in qualifying. He made his debut for Canada in a January 1986 friendly match against Paraguay and earned a total of 20 caps, scoring 1 goal. Lowery was on Canada's playing roster for the 1986 FIFA World Cup and played in the country's first game against France. In 2009, Lowery was inducted into the Canadian Soccer Hall of Fame as a member of the 1986 World Cup team.

His final international game was a June 1991 CONCACAF Gold Cup finals match against Mexico in which he scored his only international goal.

=== International goals ===
Scores and results list Canada's goal tally first.

#	Date	Venue	Opponent	Score	Result	Competition
1	June 30, 1991	Los Angeles Memorial Coliseum, Los Angeles, United States	Mexico	1–2	1–3	1991 CONCACAF Gold Cup

== Retirement ==
Lowery is a transit operator for BC Transit in Victoria.

== Post-playing career ==
Following his playing career, Lowery returned to Vancouver Island, where he works as a transit operator for BC Transit in Victoria. He has also remained involved in soccer, serving on the Organizing Committee for FIFA 2026 Activities in the Alberni Valley to help establish Port Alberni as a potential pre-tournament training base for the 2026 FIFA World Cup, leveraging his status as a former Canadian national team player.

== Honours ==
Canada

- North American Nations Cup: 1990; 3rd place, 1991
