= Paul Moreno (footballer) =

Mexican footballer (born 1962)

Personal information
- Full name: René Paul Moreno
- Date of birth: 1 September 1962 (age 64)
- Place of birth: Delicias, Chihuahua, Mexico
- Position: Midfielder

Senior career*
| Years | Team | Apps | (Gls) |
| 1982–1988 | Puebla | 180 | (45) |
| 1989–1992 | Guadalajara | 66 | (6) |
| 1992–1993 | Correcaminos | 21 | (2) |
| 1993–1994 | Guadalajara | 4 | (1) |
| 1994–1995 | Puebla | 25 | (1) |

International career
| 1983–1991 | Mexico | 7 | (2) |

Managerial career
- 2005: Puebla
- * Club domestic league appearances and goals

René Paul Moreno was a Mexican footballer who played as a midfielder.

== Career ==
He spent his entire career in the Mexican first division, mostly with Puebla F.C., where he won the 1982–83 league title and where he ranks 8th all-time in goals scored for the club with 45. He also played with C.D. Guadalajara and Correcaminos UAT during his club career. In 1994, he played his last tournament with Puebla, where he had also began his career. At international level, he played for the Mexico under-20 side in the 1983 FIFA U-20 World Cup. Following his retirement from football, he has still been active with Puebla FC and has even coached the club in 2005 when they played in the second division.

== Honours ==
Puebla FC

- Primera División Mexicana: 1982–83
- Copa México: 1987–88
