= Jorge Dávalos =

Mexican footballer and manager (born 1957)

Personal information
- Full name: Jorge Dávalos Mercado
- Date of birth: 3 July 1957 (age 69)
- Place of birth: Tala, Jalisco, Mexico
- Height: 1.82 m (5 ft 11 1/2 in)
- Position: Defender

Senior career*
Years	Team	Apps	(Gls)
1977–1991	UdeG	441	(55)

International career
1990–1991	Mexico	5	(0)

Managerial career
- 2001: Guadalajara
- 2001: Guadalajara (Assistant)
- 2009: Tigres UANL (Assistant)
- 2012: Puebla (Assistant)
- 2013: Atlante (Assistant)
- 2015: UdeG (Assistant)
- 2017–2019: UdeG
- 2019: UdeG (Interim)
- 2020–2021: UdeG
- * Club domestic league appearances and goals

Jorge Dávalos Mercado (born 3 July 1957) is a Mexican football manager and former player.
