= Juan Carlos Arguedas =

Costa Rican footballer (born 1970)

Personal information
- Full name: Juan Carlos Arguedas Ávila
- Date of birth: 3 May 1970 (age 56)
- Place of birth: Costa Rica
- Position: Midfielder

Youth career
- 1986–1988: Carmelita

Senior career*
Years	Team	Apps	(Gls)
1988–1995	Alajuelense	194	(57)
1995	→ Bucaramanga (loan)		
1995–1996	Tecos UAG	11	(1)
1996–1997	Saprissa		
1997–1998	Cobán Imperial		
1998–1999	Aurora		
1999–2000	Herediano		(23)
2000–2004	Carmelita		
2003	Virginia Beach Mariners		

International career^{‡}
1991–2000	Costa Rica	24	(4)

Managerial career
- 2004–2007: Carmelita
- 2007–2009: San Carlos
- * Club domestic league appearances and goals as of 21 April 2014 ‡ National team caps and goals as of 1 January 2014

Juan Carlos Arguedas Ávila (born 3 May 1970) is a retired Costa Rican footballer.

== Club career ==
Arguedas used to play for AD Carmelita, but was also part of the three "big teams" of Costa Rica's football, Deportivo Saprissa, Herediano and Alajuelense. He made his professional debut for the latter on 18 March 1988 against Ramonense. He was Costa Rica's league top goalscorer twice, in 1994/95 and 1999/2000 with 28 and 23 goals respectively and scored a total of 125 goals in Costa Rica's Premier Division .

=== Spells abroad ===
He also had a spell with Tecos in the Primera División de México, in the Guatemalan top division with Cobán Imperial and Aurora and with Colombian side Atlético Bucaramanga. He also had a short stint with Virginia Beach Mariners.

He announced his retirement in May 2004.

== International career ==
He played for Costa Rica at the 1989 FIFA World Youth Championship in Saudi Arabia.

He made his senior debut for Costa Rica in a May 1991 friendly match against Uruguay and earned a total of 24 caps, scoring 4 goals. He has represented his country in 4 FIFA World Cup qualification matches and played at the 1993 UNCAF Nations Cup as well as the 1991 CONCACAF Gold Cup.

He played his final international game in September 2000 against Barbados.

=== International goals ===
Scores and results list Costa Rica's goal tally first.

N.	Date	Venue	Opponent	Score	Result	Competition
1.	3 July 1991	Rose Bowl, Los Angeles, United States	United States	1–1	2–3	1991 CONCACAF Gold Cup
2.	23 August 1992	Estadio Nacional de Costa Rica, San José, Costa Rica	Panama	3–0	5–1	1994 FIFA World Cup qualification
3.	23 August 1992	Estadio Nacional de Costa Rica, San José, Costa Rica	Panama	4–0	5–1	1994 FIFA World Cup qualification
4.	16 February 1993	Estadio Nacional de Costa Rica, San José, Costa Rica	Nicaragua	4–0	6–0	1993 UNCAF Nations Cup

== Managerial career ==
After retiring as a player, Arguedas started managing Carmelita. Later he was appointed manager of San Carlos and Ramonense.
