= Anthony Corbett =

Jamaican football player (born 1962)

Personal information
- Date of birth: 8 June 1962 (age 64)
- Position: Defender

Senior career*
Years	Team	Apps	(Gls)
1990–1993	Hazard United		

International career
1985–1993	Jamaica MNT	31	(0)

Managerial career
- –2012: Boca United
- Parkland Soccer Club
- * Club domestic league appearances and goals

Anthony Corbett is a Jamaican football player. He played as defender.

== Career ==
The influential Corbett has won a Jamaica National Premier League title with Hazard United in 1993.

== International career ==
Corbett earned several caps for the Reggae Boyz in the 1980s and early 1990s and also captained the national team. He is regarded as one of the finest Jamaican defenders of all time. Corbett is well respected both on and off the football field and coaches young athletes in his spare time.

== Boca United ==
Corbett started coaching a soccer association in Boca Raton Florida. He is greatly respected there. He has trained many children and has helped them excel to their fullest potential. He has stopped coaching there in 2012 due to an incident that he had with a parent.

== Parkland Soccer Club ==
He is currently coaching the 06' boys team in Parkland.
