= Caple Donaldson =

Jamaican footballer (1966–2008)

Personal information
- Date of birth: 5 October 1966
- Place of birth: Jamaica
- Date of death: January 2008 (aged 41)
- Place of death: Jamaica
- Position: Striker

Senior career*
Years	Team	Apps	(Gls)
–1995	Reno		

International career
1991	Jamaica	2	(0)
- * Club domestic league appearances and goals

Caple Donaldson (5 October 1966 – January 2008) was a Jamaican footballer who last played as a striker for Reno.

== Career ==
Donaldson started his career with Jamaican side Reno, helping them win 3 consecutive top flight titles, their only top flight titles. In 2009, Donaldson's number 7 jersey was retired after his death.
