= Félix Cruz =

Mexican footballer (born 1961)

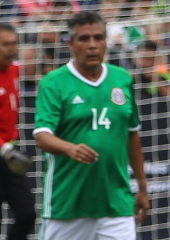

Personal information
- Full name: Félix Cruz Barbosa-Ríos
- Date of birth: 4 April 1961 (age 65)
- Place of birth: Torreón, Mexico
- Height: 1.78 m (5 ft 10 in)
- Position: Defender

Senior career*
Years	Team	Apps	(Gls)
1980–1987	Pumas	121	(7)
1980–1982	→ Nissan Motors (loan)	9	(0)
1987–1988	Atlante	18	(2)
1988–1989	Tigres UANL	34	(0)
1989–1993	Monterrey	97	(1)
1993–1994	Toros Neza	33	(1)
Total		312	(11)

International career
1983–1991	Mexico	52	(1)

Managerial career
- 2009–2010: La Piedad
- * Club domestic league appearances and goals

Félix Cruz Barbosa-Ríos (born 4 April 1961) is a Mexican football manager and former player who played as a defender for Mexico in the 1986 FIFA World Cup.

== Club career ==
Cruz began his footballing career in Mexico with Pumas in 1980. However, having his opportunities limited with Pumas he played in Japan for Nissan Motors where he remained for two seasons. Other clubs Cruz played for were Atlante F.C., Tigres UANL, C.F. Monterrey and Toros Neza.

== International career ==
He represented Mexico as a player in the 1986 FIFA World Cup tournaments and earned a total of 52 caps, scoring 1 goal.
