= Adrián Chávez =

Mexican footballer (born 1962)

Personal information
- Full name: Adrián Chávez Ortiz
- Date of birth: 27 June 1962 (age 64)
- Place of birth: Mexico City, Mexico
- Height: 1.87 m (6 ft 1 1/2 in)
- Position: Goalkeeper

Senior career*
Years	Team	Apps	(Gls)
1981–1982	Atlético Español	9	(0)
1982–1985	Necaxa	75	(0)
1985–1986	León	23	(0)
1986–1996	América	308	(0)
1996	Atlante		
1997	Atlético Celaya	21	(0)
1997	León	10	(0)
1998–1999	Cruz Azul		
2000	UNAM		

International career
1988–1994	Mexico	7	(0)
- * Club domestic league appearances and goals

Adrián Chávez Ortiz (born 27 June 1962) is a Mexican former footballer who played as a goalkeeper.

== Early life ==
Chávez was born on 27 June 1962 in Mexico City, Mexico. His father was Al Pinkston, an African-American baseball player who was playing for Rojos del Aguila de Veracruz of the Mexican League at the time of his birth. Pinkston wanted to take Chávez with him back to the U.S., but his mother wouldn't allow it, going as far as changing Chávez's name to prevent him from doing so. Chávez never met Pinkston in person, but in 1982 he attempted to reach out to him after learning of his heritage, only to find out that he had died a year earlier.

== Club career ==
Chávez played club football for Necaxa, América, Atlante and Universidad Nacional. He spent most of his 20-year career with América.

== International career ==
Chávez played for Mexico at the international level.
