= Guillermo Muñoz (footballer, born 1961) =

Mexican footballer (born 1961)

Personal information
- Full name: Guillermo Muñoz Ramírez
- Date of birth: October 20, 1961 (age 65)
- Place of birth: Monterrey, Nuevo León, Mexico
- Height: 1.73 m (5 ft 8 in)
- Position: Defender

Senior career*
Years	Team	Apps	(Gls)
1982–1984	Atlético Zamora		
1984–1993	CF Monterrey		
1993	La Raza (indoor)		
1993–1995	Club León		
1995	La Raza (indoor)		
1995–1996	Tigres UANL		
1996	Real Zacatecas		

International career
1987–1993	Mexico	20	(0)
Medal record
Representing Mexico
Runner-up	Copa America	1993
- * Club domestic league appearances and goals as of 16 November 2008

Guillermo Muñoz Ramírez (born 20 October 1961) is a Mexican former football defender, who was nicknamed "El Turbo". He has 20 caps for the Mexico national team between 1987 and 1993, and on the squad at the 1993 Copa América. He made his debut on 17 January 1987.

== Career ==
Muñoz joined C.F. Monterrey in 1984, and played for the club until 1993. He played in 13 Clasicos against local rivals UANL Tigres, a club he would join late in his career during the 1995-96 season.
