= Brian Quinn (soccer) =

Professional soccer player-coach

Personal information
- Date of birth: 24 May 1960 (age 66)
- Place of birth: Belfast, Northern Ireland
- Position: Midfielder

Senior career*
Years	Team	Apps	(Gls)
1978–1979	Larne	?	(?)
1979–1981	Everton	0	(0)
1981	Los Angeles Aztecs	21	(2)
1982–1983	Montreal Manic	55	(6)
1983–1984	San Diego Sockers (indoor)	32	(25)
1984	San Diego Sockers	20	(3)
1984–1991	San Diego Sockers (indoor)	255	(155)
1988	Hamilton Steelers	14	(2)
1991–1994	USSF		
1991–1992	→ San Diego Sockers (loan)	16	(5)

International career
1991–1994	United States	48	(1)

Managerial career
- 1995–1996: San Diego Sockers
- 1997–1999: San Jose Clash
- 2001–2004: San Diego Sockers
- 2008–2017: University of San Diego (assistant)
- 2018–: University of San Diego
Medal record
Representing United States
Winner	CONCACAF Gold Cup	1991
Men's Soccer
- * Club domestic league appearances and goals

Brian Quinn (born 24 May 1960) is a Northern Irish-American soccer coach and former player who is the head coach of the San Diego Toreros men's soccer team at the University of San Diego (USD). He spent most of his professional career in North America where he played in the North American Soccer League and the Major Indoor Soccer League. He later coached in the Continental Indoor Soccer League and Major League Soccer.

== Player ==
=== Professional ===
As a youth, Quinn had preferred Gaelic football and hurling to soccer. It was not until he was fourteen that he began to play the game regularly in the Down & Connor League with Corpus Christi Youth Club and Blessed Oliver Plunkett Youth Club (Now St. Oliver Plunkett FC). In 1978, he began his playing career with Larne F.C. In 1979, he signed with Everton between 1979 and 1981, but spent his entire time on the reserve squad. In 1981, Quinn moved to the US to join the Los Angeles Aztecs of the North American Soccer League. When the Aztecs folded at the end of the season, he moved to the Montreal Manic for 1982 and 1983 outdoor seasons. The Manic folded at the end of the 1983 season, and Quinn signed with the San Diego Sockers as they prepared for the 1983–1984 NASL indoor season. In 1984, he played the last NASL season with the Sockers. In the fall of 1984, the Sockers jumped to the Major Indoor Soccer League as the NASL collapsed. He also played a season in the Canadian Soccer League in the late '80s with the Hamilton Steelers. Brian played seven MISL seasons Sockers winning six championships. In 1987, he played one outdoor season with the Hamilton Steelers of the Canadian Soccer League. In August 1991, he announced that he was leaving the team to sign with the US national team. In October 1991, the national team sent Quinn on loan back to the Sockers until January 1992.

=== National team ===
Quinn earned 48 caps for the US national team between 1991 and 1994 upon becoming an American citizen. A midfielder, he was a final cut for the 1994 World Cup squad. He scored his only international goal in a 3–0 win over Guatemala. He made his debut against the Republic of Ireland in a friendly played at Foxboro Stadium.

Quinn was most recently nominated to US Soccer's National Soccer Hall of Fame Veteran's ballot.

== Coach ==
In February 1995, the San Diego Sockers, now playing in the Continental Indoor Soccer League, hired Quinn to replace long-time head coach Ron Newman. In 1997, he became the head coach of the San Jose Clash of Major League Soccer. As the youngest coach in league history, he compiled a 35–41 record over nearly three seasons. He then returned to the San Diego Sockers. He remained with them until the team ceased operations at the end of 2004. He has launched the Brian Quinn School of Soccer. In 2008, he became an assistant coach with the University of San Diego men's team. In addition, he furthers Youth Soccer Development as the Director of Younger Boys Soccer at the San Diego Soccer Club.

He also wrote the foreword to the book, A History of the World Cup: 1930–2006, which was released in August 2007.

== Awards and honors ==
In March 2013, Quinn was one of six men named to the 2013 class of the Indoor Soccer Hall of Fame. The other inductees are Gordon Jago, Preki, Kai Haaskivi, Zoltán Tóth, and Mike Stankovic.
