= Hugo Pérez (soccer, born 1963) =

Professional soccer player and coach

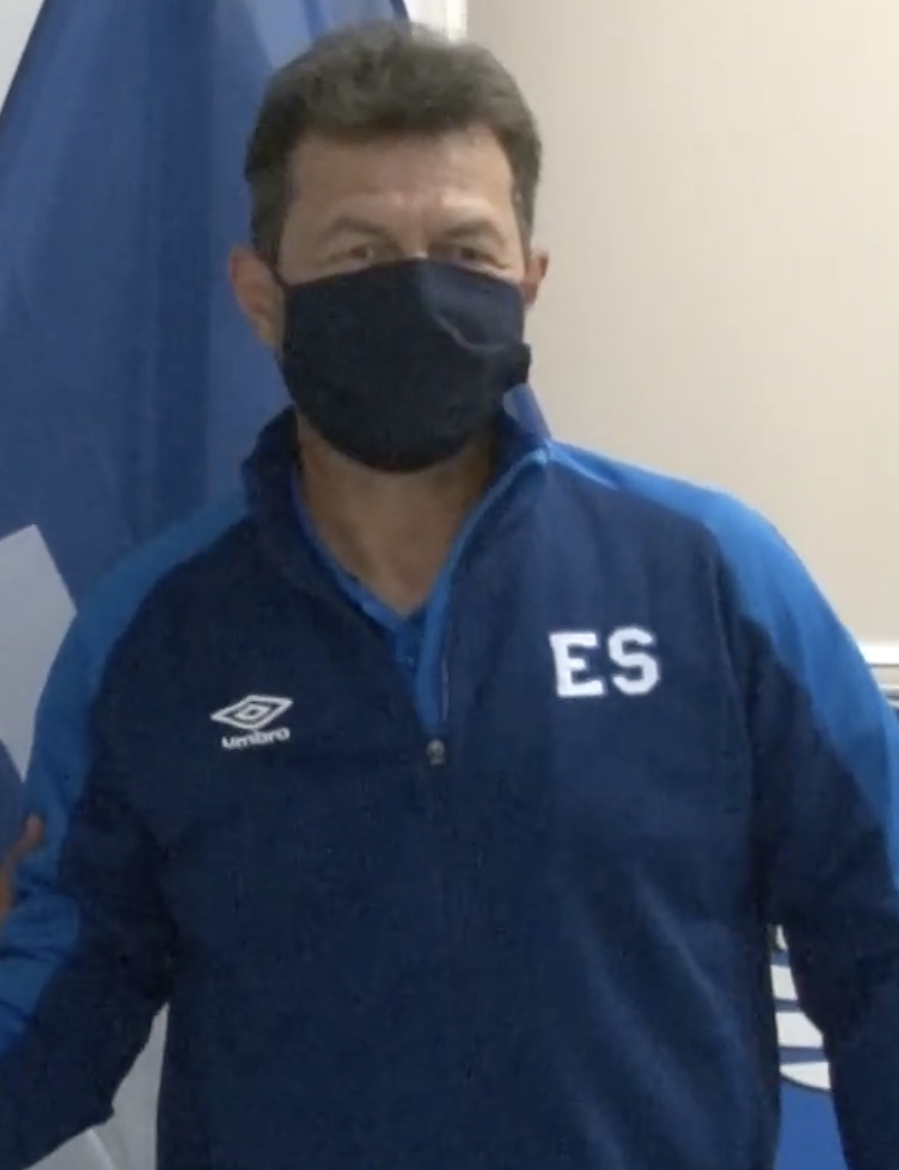
- Pérez in 2021

Personal information
- Full name: Hugo Ernesto Pérez Granados
- Date of birth: November 8, 1963 (age 62)
- Place of birth: San Salvador, El Salvador
- Height: 5 ft 8 in (1.73 m)
- Position: Midfielder

Senior career*
Years	Team	Apps	(Gls)
1982	Los Angeles Aztecs	0	(0)
1982–1983	Tampa Bay Rowdies	20	(0)
1983–1984	San Diego Sockers	29	(7)
1984–1990	San Diego Sockers (indoor)	125	(107)
1986	Los Angeles Heat		
1990	Red Star Paris		
1990–1991	Örgryte IS	2	(0)
1992	Al-Ittihad		
1994	Los Angeles Salsa		
1994–1996	CD FAS		

International career
1984–1994	United States	73	(13)

Managerial career
- 2002–2005: San Francisco Dons (assistant)
- 2007: California Victory (assistant)
- 2012–2013: United States U14
- 2012–2014: United States U15
- 2015: El Salvador (assistant)
- 2016: El Salvador (assistant)
- 2021: El Salvador U23
- 2021–2023: El Salvador
Medal record
Representing United States
Winner	CONCACAF Gold Cup	1991
Runner-up	CONCACAF Championship	1989
Men's Soccer
- * Club domestic league appearances and goals

Hugo Ernesto Pérez Granados (born November 8, 1963) is a former professional soccer player and coach who previously coached the El Salvador national from 2021 to 2023. Born in El Salvador, he represented the United States national team.

During his fourteen-year career, he played professionally in the United States, France, Sweden, Saudi Arabia and his native El Salvador. Although born in El Salvador, he gained his U.S. citizenship as a youth and earned 73 caps, scoring sixteen goals, with the U.S. national team between 1984 and 1994. He was a member of the U.S. team at both the 1984 Summer Olympics and the 1994 FIFA World Cup. He was the 1991 U.S. Soccer Athlete of the Year and was inducted into the National Soccer Hall of Fame in 2008.

== Early life ==
Pérez was born in El Salvador, where both his grandfather and father both played professionally for C.D. FAS, the club with which Pérez would finish his career. He migrated with his family to the United States when he was 11 and gained his U.S. citizenship in the mid-1980s. He chose to forego college.

== Club career ==
In 1982, Pérez signed with the Los Angeles Aztecs of the NASL. He also spent time with the Tampa Bay Rowdies before ending up with the San Diego Sockers. In 1988, he was the championship MVP when the Sockers won the MISL championship. That summer he joined Ajax during the team's pre-season. Ajax manager Johan Cruyff expressed an interest in signing him, but the Sockers refused to release Pérez. In 1989, he played for the Los Angeles Heat of the Western Soccer Alliance.

Cruyff then attempted to work a transfer for Pérez to Italian club Parma in 1990, but Parma needed Pérez to play in the World Cup in order to get him a work permit. Pérez was part of the 1990 World Cup Roster, but when U.S. coach Gansler left Pérez off the U.S. team that traveled, due to a question of match fitness due to injury, this nixed the move to Italy. Instead, Pérez moved to France where he played with Red Star Paris. From France, Pérez moved to Swedish First Division club Örgryte IS then Saudi Arabian First Division club Al-Ittihad.

In 1994, he returned to the United States and played in the 1994 World Cup and after played for the Los Angeles Salsa of the American Professional Soccer League. Hugo played with the Salsa while negotiating a contract with C.D FAS. The Salsa folded at the end of the 1994 season and Pérez made his last move, to Primera División de Fútbol de El Salvador club C.D. FAS, commonly known as C.D. FAS. In both of Pérez' years with the club, 1994–1995 and 1995–1996, C.D. FAS won the El Salvador championship. He retired in 1996 from professional soccer.

== International career ==
Pérez was a member of the American squad that competed at the 1983 FIFA World Youth Championship and 1984 Summer Olympics. He also helped the U.S. qualify for the 1988 Summer Olympics and the 1990 FIFA World Cup, which he missed when he tore ligaments in his leg playing for Red Star Paris, a French Second Division club. He was named U.S. Soccer Athlete of the Year in 1991. He played 73 international matches for the U.S. between 1984 and 1994, in which he scored thirteen goals. At the 1994 FIFA World Cup, Pérez played in the second-round game against Brazil.

== Retirement ==
After retiring from playing, Pérez moved to the San Francisco area where he has served as the principal for the Living Hope Christian School. On March 10, 2008, Pérez was elected to the National Soccer Hall of Fame.

He is the uncle of UD Ibiza and El Salvador U-23 player, Joshua Pérez.

== Coaching career ==
In August 2002, he joined the University of San Francisco as an assistant coach to its men's soccer team. On December 7, 2007, the California Victory, a USL First Division expansion franchise, announced that Pérez had joined its staff as an assistant coach.

=== United States U-15 ===
Pérez was coach of the U15s from August 7, 2012, to August 23, 2014. He resigned afterwards. He stated "Yes, this is my last camp, I don't know [what is next for me]; that is up to U.S. Soccer. Obviously, I'm employed by them and whatever they do I am open to it. It's been an honor to work with these kids and an honor to get to know them."

=== El Salvador ===
After Albert Roca resigned as coach of El Salvador in July 2015, Pérez once again expressed his interest in coaching El Salvador. On August 21, 2015, it was announced that Pérez has been hired as the new assistant coach of El Salvador to Jorge Rodríguez. In April 2021, after having coached the El Salvador under-23 national team, Pérez was named head coach of the senior team, the first American to coach El Salvador after 91 years. Under this tutelage, El Salvador began recruiting players born in the United States to Salvadoran parents, who later made up a quarter of their World Cup qualifying roster in 2021. On September 11, 2023, Pérez was fired as the head coach of the El Salvador national team the day following a 2–3 loss to Trinidad and Tobago during the 2023–24 CONCACAF Nations League.

== Personal life ==
His nephew Joshua Pérez is a professional soccer player who, as of 2026, plays for Polish side Odra Opole. Born in the United States, Joshua played for the El Salvador national team while Hugo managed the team for two years.

== Career statistics ==
=== International ===
Appearances and goals by national team and year
National team	Year	Apps	Starts	Goals	Assists
United States	1984	5	3	0	0
United States	1985	6	5	1	0
United States	1988	1	0	1	0
United States	1989	2	2	1	0
United States	1990	2	2	0	0
United States	1991	11	9	1	2
United States	1992	17	17	3	1
United States	1993	12	12	3	2
United States	1994	17	16	3	3
Total		73	66	13	8

Scores and results list the United States' goal tally first, score column indicates score after each Pérez goal.

List of international goals scored by Hugo Pérez
No.	Date	Venue	Opponent	Score	Result	Competition
1	April 4, 1985	Portland, Oregon	Canada	1–1	1–1	Friendly
2	August 13, 1988	St. Louis, Missouri	Jamaica	2–1	5–1	1990 World Cup qualifying
3	September 17, 1989	Tegucigalpa, Honduras	El Salvador	1–0	1–0	1990 World Cup qualifying
4	July 3, 1991	Los Angeles, California	Costa Rica	2–2	3–2	1991 CONCACAF Gold Cup
5	March 18, 1992	Casablanca, Morocco	Morocco	1–2	1–3	Friendly
6	April 4, 1992	Palo Alto, California	China	1–0	5–0	Friendly
7	April 4, 1992	Palo Alto, California	China	5–0	5–0	Friendly
8	March 14, 1993	Tokyo, Japan	Japan	1–0	1–3	1993 Kirin Cup
9	October 16, 1993	High Point, North Carolina	Ukraine	1–0	1–2	Friendly
10	December 5, 1993	Los Angeles, California	El Salvador	5–0	7–0	Friendly
11	February 20, 1994	Miami, Florida	Sweden	1–3	1–3	Friendly
12	March 26, 1994	Dallas, Texas	Bolivia	1–1	2–2	Friendly

== Honors ==
San Diego Sockers

- North American Soccer League: 1984–85, 1985–86, 1987–88, 1988–89, 1989–90

FAS

- Primera División de Fútbol de El Salvador: 1994–95, 1995–96

United States

- CONCACAF Gold Cup: 1991

Individual

- U.S. Soccer Athlete of the Year: 1991
- Fútbol de Primera Player of the Year: 1991
