= Peter Vermes =

American soccer player and coach

Personal information
- Full name: Peter Joseph Vermes
- Date of birth: November 21, 1966 (age 59)
- Place of birth: Willingboro, New Jersey, United States
- Height: 6 ft 1 in (1.85 m)
- Position: Defender

College career
Years	Team	Apps	(Gls)
1984	Loyola Greyhounds		
1985–1987	Rutgers Scarlet Knights		

Senior career*
Years	Team	Apps	(Gls)
1988	New Jersey Eagles		(2)
1989	Győr	9	(0)
1989–1990	Volendam	28	(5)
1991	Tampa Bay Rowdies	3	(1)
1991–1995	Figueres	28	(4)
1995	→ New York Fever (loan)	25	(16)
1996	MetroStars	33	(1)
1997–1999	Colorado Rapids	98	(8)
2000–2002	Kansas City Wizards	78	(2)
Total		302	(39)

International career
1988–1997	United States	66	(11)

Managerial career
- 2009–2025: Sporting Kansas City (Note: Sporting Kansas City was known as the Kansas City Wizards during Vermes' tenure, from 2009–2010)
Medal record
Representing United States
Winner	CONCACAF Gold Cup	1991
Runner-up	CONCACAF Gold Cup	1993
Men's Soccer
- * Club domestic league appearances and goals

Peter Joseph Vermes (/vɜːrˈmiːs/; born November 21, 1966) is an American professional soccer coach and former player. From 2009 to 2025, he was the head coach of Sporting Kansas City in Major League Soccer.

Entering the 2025 MLS season, Vermes was the longest-tenured head coach in MLS and has won four major trophies as a manager, the second most of all active coaches in MLS.

As a player, Vermes spent several seasons playing in Hungary, the Netherlands, before establishing himself as a defender in Major League Soccer, playing for MetroStars, Colorado Rapids and the Kansas City Wizards. Vermes was also a regular member of the United States national team throughout the 1990s, and represented his country at the 1988 Summer Olympics, the 1990 FIFA World Cup and the 1991 CONCACAF Gold Cup.

On April 4, 2013, Vermes was elected to the National Soccer Hall of Fame.

== Youth and college ==
Vermes was born in Willingboro, New Jersey. He grew up in Delran Township, New Jersey and played high school soccer at Delran High School. He graduated in 1984, having scored 109 goals. In 1999, he was named by The Star-Ledger as one of the top ten New Jersey high school soccer players of the 1980s.

Vermes played his first year in college on the men's soccer team at Loyola College in Maryland under head coach Bill Sento. Vermes then transferred and played three years of college soccer at Rutgers University, from 1985 to 1987. In his final season, Vermes scored 21 goals and 10 assists for the team, finishing a first-team All-American, as well as runner-up for the National Player of the Year Award. During that season, Vermes led Rutgers to their first victory in the NCAA Tournament in 26 years, scoring the winning goal in a contest against Seton Hall University.

== Playing career ==
=== Professional ===
After graduating, Vermes went to Europe, where he played with Rába ETO FC of Hungary in 1989 and Volendam of the Dutch Eredivisie in 1990. In May 1991, Vermes returned to the United States and played three games, scoring a single goal against the Tampa Bay Rowdies of the American Professional Soccer League. He then moved to Spain where he played for Spanish Second Division club Figueres from 1991 to 1995.

Like many American players, Vermes returned to the United States to join the recently founded domestic league Major League Soccer. In January 1995, he signed with the new league that would not begin league play until 1996. Therefore, MLS loaned Vermes to the New York Fever of the USISL where he played 25 games, scoring 16 goals in the 1995 season. In 1996, Vermes was drafted by the New York/New Jersey MetroStars in the third round of the MLS Inaugural Draft (29th overall) and captained the team in its first season. Although he played the most minutes of any MetroStar that year, the MetroStars traded Vermes on February 3, 1997, to the Colorado Rapids for Kerry Zavagnin. Vermes would play three years for the Rapids before being traded again, this time to the Kansas City Wizards with Matt McKeon for Scott Vermillion and a player allocation.

With the Wizards, Vermes helped the Wizards finish the season first in the league with a 16–7–9 record, having allowed only 29 goals in 32 games, and eventually winning the MLS Cup. Vermes was recognized as the MLS Defender of the Year, while his teammate Tony Meola won both the MLS Goalkeeper of the Year and MLS MVP awards. Vermes played two more seasons with the Wizards, struggling with injuries but playing every game he was healthy for, before announcing his retirement at the end of the 2002 season.

=== International ===
Vermes received his first cap May 14, 1988, against Colombia, and would in all receive 66 caps for the team, playing in the 1988 Olympics, the 1990 World Cup and the 1991 CONCACAF Gold Cup. In the 1990 World Cup, he nearly bagged a goal against Italy with a shot against Italian goalkeeper Walter Zenga. After seeing his playing time wane with the team in late 1993 and early 1994, Vermes was one of the final cuts from the 1994 U.S. World Cup team. He later said he thought that his outspoken comments had doomed him politically. A forward early in his career, his performance in defense in MLS led to his comeback to the National team in that position after years of absence, but he was cut again from the U.S. roster in January 1998.

Vermes was named the 1988 U.S. Soccer Athlete of the Year and U.S. Olympic Player of the Year.

In 1989, he scored six goals for the U.S. futsal team which took third place at the FIFA Futsal World Championship in Rotterdam, the Netherlands. He ended his futsal career with 11 caps and 7 goals.

=== International goals ===
#	Date	Venue	Opponent	Score	Result	Competition
1	March 28, 1990	East Berlin, East Germany	East Germany	2–1	3–2	Friendly
2	May 9, 1990	Hershey, Pennsylvania	Poland	2–1	3–1	Friendly
3	May 30, 1990	Eschen, Liechtenstein	Liechtenstein	1–0	4–1	Friendly
4	September 15, 1990	High Point, North Carolina	Trinidad and Tobago	1–0	3–0	Friendly
5	October 10, 1990	Warsaw, Poland	Poland	1–1	3–2	Friendly
6	October 10, 1990	Warsaw, Poland	Poland	2–1	3–2	Friendly
7	May 5, 1991	Denver, Colorado	Uruguay	1–0	1–0	Friendly
8	July 3, 1991	Los Angeles, California	Costa Rica	1–0	3–2	1991 Gold Cup
9	July 5, 1991	Los Angeles, California	Mexico	2–0	2–0	1991 Gold Cup
10	September 3, 1992	Saint John, Canada	Canada	2–0	2–0	Friendly
11	April 17, 1993	Costa Mesa, California	Iceland	1–1	1–1	Friendly

== Coaching career ==
=== Kansas City ===
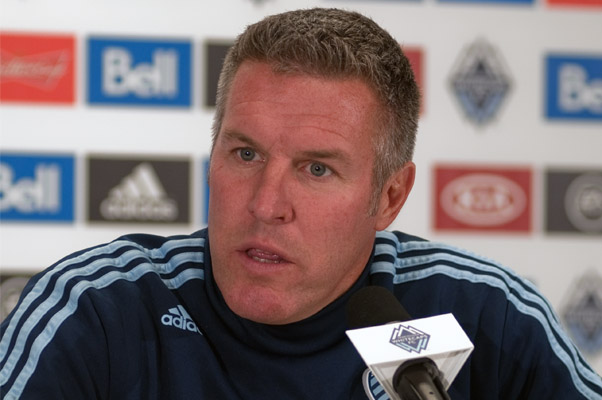
Vermes was the first person to win MLS Cup with the same club as player (2000) and head coach (2013).

Vermes was appointed as the technical Director for the Kansas City Wizards of Major League Soccer in November 2006.

He was named interim coach of the Wizards on August 4, 2009, one day after predecessor Curt Onalfo was fired by the team. The team was in sixth place in the MLS Eastern Conference with a 5–6–7 record. Vermes would lead to the Wizards to a 3–7–2 record down the stretch. Following the season, the Wizards removed the interim tag from his title.

In 2012, Vermes won his first piece of silverware as a head coach, leading the renamed Sporting Kansas City (changed from the Kansas City Wizards in 2010) to a penalty shootout win over three-time defending champions Seattle Sounders FC to win the 2012 Lamar Hunt U.S. Open Cup. The following year, Vermes led the club to the MLS Cup, where they beat Real Salt Lake, also in a penalty shoot-out. This makes him the only person to ever win the MLS Cup as both a player and a coach with the same team.

Vermes won his third trophy as Sporting KC coach when his side won the 2015 Lamar Hunt U.S. Open Cup by defeating the Philadelphia Union on penalties at Talen Energy Stadium. Two years later, Vermes added the 2017 Lamar Hunt U.S. Open Cup to his trophy haul when Sporting KC beat the New York Red Bulls 2–1 at Children's Mercy Park.

On August 4, 2018, Vermes coached his 302nd regular-season match – a 1–0 victory over the Houston Dynamo – becoming the all-time leader in games coached with one club in MLS history.

On October 3, 2020, Vermes won his 150th regular-season match, with a 2–1 victory over the Houston Dynamo, becoming only the 5th coach in MLS history to do so.

In February 2023, Vermes signed a five-year extension with Sporting Kansas City through the 2028 MLS season.

On March 31, 2025, amid a winless start to the season (0W-5L-1D), Sporting Kansas City announced that it had agreed to mutually part ways with Vermes.

=== Other coaching and activities ===
Vermes worked as a broadcaster for the San Jose Earthquakes. Vermes serves as the technical Director of Coaching for the Blue Valley Soccer Club in Overland Park, Kansas, and was an assistant coach for the U.S. Under-20 National Team.

== Personal life ==
Vermes's parents immigrated to the United States from Hungary as refugees during the 1956 revolution. His father, Michael, was a professional footballer for Budapest Honvéd FC and operated an indoor soccer training center in New Jersey after immigrating. Peter has two brothers and one sister.

Peter married his wife Susan, whom he met in high school, in 1990. The couple have two children.

Vermes was arrested for a suspected DUI on August 24, 2010, by police in Gardner, Kansas. He accepted one year of probation and the charge was dropped. The incident was mocked by Philadelphia Union supporters during a match in September 2010, with the Sons of Ben singing the entire folk song "99 Bottles of Beer" during the team's match against Kansas City.

== Coaching statistics ==
As of match played March 29, 2025

Coaching record by team and tenure
Team	Nat	From	To	Record							
Team	Nat	From	To	G	W	D	L	GF	GA	GD	Win %
Sporting Kansas City	(United States)	August 4, 2009	March 31, 2025	608	251	140	217	886	790	+96	41.28
Total				608	251	140	217	886	790	+96	41.28

== Honors ==
=== Player ===
Kansas City Wizards

- MLS Cup: 2000
- Supporters' Shield: 2000

United States

- CONCACAF Gold Cup: 1991

=== Coach ===
Sporting Kansas City

- MLS Cup: 2013
- U.S. Open Cup: 2012, 2015, 2017; runner-up: 2024
- Eastern Conference: 2013

=== Individual ===
- National Soccer Hall of Fame Inductee: 2013
- U.S. Soccer Athlete of the Year: 1988
- MLS Defender of the Year Award: 2000
- MLS All-Star: 2000
- MLS Best XI: 2000
- MLS Sporting Executive of the Year: 2019

== See also ==
- List of current MLS coaches
