= Heawood =

Heawood is a surname. Notable people with the surname include:

- Edward Heawood (1861–1949), British geographer
- Jonathan Heawood, British journalist
- Percy John Heawood (1861–1955), British mathematician
  - Heawood conjecture
  - Heawood graph
  - Heawood number

== See also ==
- Heywood (surname)
