= Gilberto Yearwood =

Honduran footballer (born 1956)

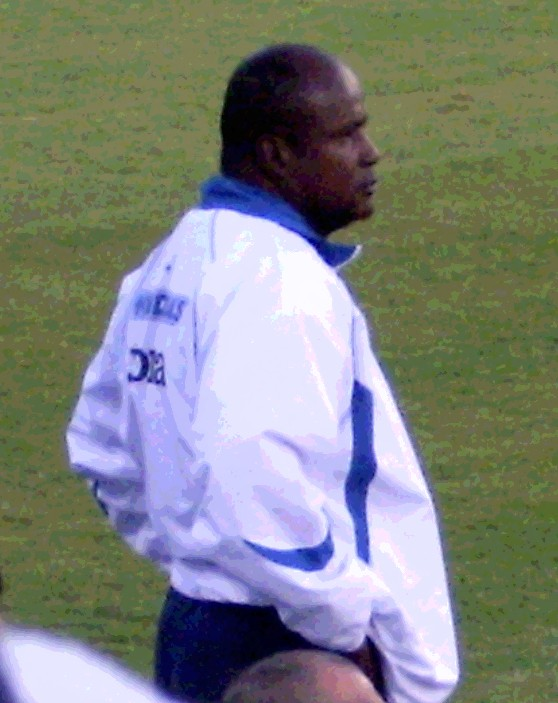
- Gilberto Yearwood in 2008.

Personal information
- Full name: Gilberto Jerónimo Yearwood
- Date of birth: 15 March 1956 (age 70)
- Place of birth: La Lima, Honduras
- Height: 1.83 m (6 ft 0 in)
- Position: Midfielder

Youth career
- 1976: Los Alacranes

Senior career*
Years	Team	Apps	(Gls)
1975–1977	Real España		(10)
1977–1980	Elche	117	(4)
1980–1983	Real Valladolid	64	(7)
1983–1984	Tenerife	31	(7)
1984–1985	Celta de Vigo	30	(5)
1985–1986	Elche	29	(0)
1986–1987	Olimpia		
1988–1989	Motagua		(6)
1991–1994	Olimpia		

International career^{‡}
1982–1993	Honduras	46	(1)

Managerial career
- 1996–1997: Real Maya
- 1997–1998: Olimpia
- 1998–1999: Real España
- 1999–2000: Broncos
- 2000–2001: Motagua (Champion)
- 2001–2002: Honduras
- 2003–2005: Guatemala (assistant)
- 2006: Marathón
- 2006–2007: Atlético Olanchano
- 2007–2008: Real España
- 2008: Honduras U23
- 2008–2010: Xinabajul
- 2010–2012: USAC
- 2012–2014: Sacachispas
- 2014–2015: American School of Tegucigalpa
- 2015–2016: El Salvador (assistant)
- * Club domestic league appearances and goals ‡ National team caps and goals as of 2008

Gilberto Jerónimo Yearwood (born 15 March 1956) is a Honduran former football player. He is by many regarded as one of Honduras' best players of all time.

== Club career ==
Nicknamed el Vikingo (The Viking), Yearwood has played mostly in defensive midfield and started his career at Real C.D. España in his native country. In 1977, he moved abroad to play in Spain and spent 10 season playing for Elche CF, Real Valladolid, CD Tenerife and Celta de Vigo. He finished his career as a central defender back in Honduras with C.D. Olimpia, F.C. Motagua and C.D. Marathón. His final league match was on 8 May 1994, when he played with Olimpia against Vida.

He scored 20 goals in Liga Nacional: 10 with Real España, 6 with Motagua and 4 for Olimpia.

== International career ==
Yearwood played and scored at the 1977 FIFA World Youth Championship, the inaugural staging of the FIFA World Youth Championship held in Tunisia. He made his senior debut for Honduras in a June 1982 FIFA World Cup match against Spain, which was his country's first ever World Cup match, and has earned a total of at least 46 caps, scoring 1 goal. He has represented his country in 21 FIFA World Cup qualification matches and played at the 1991 and 1993 UNCAF Nations Cups as well as at the 1991 CONCACAF Gold Cup.

His final international was a May 1993 FIFA World Cup qualification match against Mexico.

=== International goals ===
Scores and results list Honduras' goal tally first.

No	Date	Venue	Opponent	Score	Result	Competition
1.	30 June 1991	Los Angeles Memorial Coliseum, Los Angeles, United States	Jamaica	5–0	5–0	1991 CONCACAF Gold Cup

== Managerial career ==
As a coach, he has been in charge of Motagua winning his first title, Olimpia, Broncos (with whom he got relegated), Real Maya, Real España and Atlético Olanchano in Honduras as well as Dragón in El Salvador.

He was announced manager of C.D. Marathón in March 2006, later he was sacked by Atlético Olanchano in November 2007 and in 2008 he moved abroad again to take charge of Xinabajul in Guatemala.

He left Xinabajul in September 2010 and became in charge of USAC, with whom he clinched promotion to Guatemala's top tier. In October 2012 he joined Guatemalan second division side Sacachispas after being dismissed by USAC.

== Honours and awards ==
=== Club ===
C.D. Real Espana

- Liga Profesional de Honduras (2): 1975–76, 1976–77

C.D. Olimpia

- Liga Profesional de Honduras (1): 1992–93

=== Country ===
Honduras

- Copa Centroamericana (1): 1993

=== Individual ===
- La Liga Team of The Year: 1981

- CONCACAF Team of the Century: 1998
