= Luis Cálix (footballer, born 1965) =

Honduran footballer

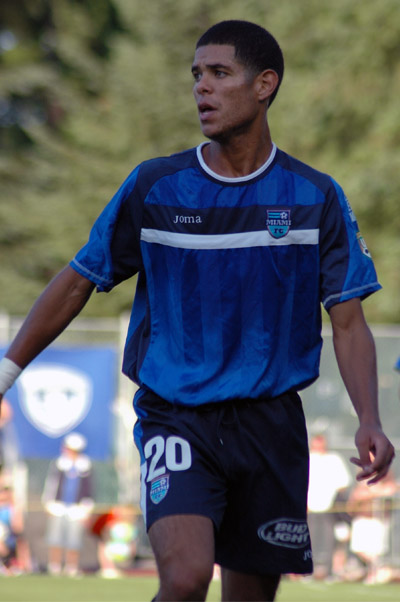
- Luis Cálix in 2008.

Personal information
- Full name: Luis Enrique Cálix Acosta
- Date of birth: 30 August 1965 (age 61)
- Place of birth: Tela, Honduras
- Position: Midfielder

Senior career*
Years	Team	Apps	(Gls)
1984–1986	Tela Timsa		
1987–1990	Real España		
1990–1991	Santos Laguna	14	(2)
1992–1994	Petrotela		
1994–1995	Marathón		
1998–1999	Real España		

International career
1988–1994	Honduras	47	(9)

Managerial career
- 2013–: Parrillas One
- * Club domestic league appearances and goals

Luis Enrique Cálix Acosta (born 30 August 1965) is a retired Honduran football player who made his name with his national team in the early 1990s.

== Club career ==
Nicknamed El Gavilán (the Hawk), the moustached Cálix started his career at hometown club Tela Timsa and also played for Real España, Marathón and had an unsuccessful spell in Mexico with Santos Laguna.

His final league game was on 10 July 1999 when he played for Real España against Olimpia.

== International career ==
Cálix made his debut for Honduras in the late 1980s and has earned a total of 47 caps, scoring 9 goals. He has represented his country in 14 FIFA World Cup qualification matches and played at the 1993 UNCAF Nations Cup, as well as at the 1991 and 1993 CONCACAF Gold Cups.

His final international was a June 8, 1994 2-8 demolition by soon to be crowned-World Cup winners Brazil in San Diego in which he scored one of Honduras' consolation goals.

=== International goals ===
Scores and results list Honduras' goal tally first.

N.	Date	Venue	Opponent	Score	Result	Competition
1.	28 June 1991	Memorial Coliseum, Los Angeles, USA	Canada	3–0	4-2	1991 CONCACAF Gold Cup
2.	30 June 1991	Memorial Coliseum, Los Angeles, USA	Jamaica	1–0	5-0	1991 CONCACAF Gold Cup
3.	30 June 1991	Memorial Coliseum, Los Angeles, USA	Jamaica	3–0	5-0	1991 CONCACAF Gold Cup
4.	28 June 1992	Estadio Francisco Morazán, San Pedro Sula, Honduras	Panama	3–0	4–0	Friendly match
5.	12 August 1992	Memorial Coliseum, Los Angeles, USA	El Salvador	1–0	3–0	Friendly match
6.	22 September 1992	Estadio Tiburcio Carías Andino, Tegucigalpa, Honduras	Jamaica	2–1	5–1	Friendly match
7.	22 September 1992	Estadio Tiburcio Carías Andino, Tegucigalpa, Honduras	Jamaica	5–1	5–1	Friendly match
8.	7 March 1993	Estadio Tiburcio Carías Andino, Tegucigalpa, Honduras	Costa Rica	2–0	2-0	1993 UNCAF Nations Cup
9.	8 June 1994	Jack Murphy Stadium, San Diego, USA	Brazil	1–3	2-8	Friendly match

== Managerial career ==
After he quit playing at 33 years of age, Cálix moved to the United States to work in construction and to become a minor league coach at Kendall Soccer College and Miami FC. He became in charge of Honduran Second Division side Parrillas One ahead of the 2013 Clausura and winning promotion to the top tier.

== Personal life ==
His son Luis Calix played for Miami FC and joined his father at Parrillas One.

== Honours and awards ==
=== Club ===
C.D. Real Espana

- Liga Profesional de Honduras (2): 1988–89, 1990–91

C.D. Marathón

- Honduran Cup: (1): 1994

=== Country ===
Honduras

- Copa Centroamericana (1): 1993
